= Anniston and Tinsley Price =

American child actresses (born 2012)

- Born: August 4, 2012 (age 13)
- Occupation: Actresses
- Years active: 2013–present

Anniston Price and Tinsley Price (born August 4, 2012), also known as The Price Twins, are American child actresses. They shared the role of Holly Wheeler in the first four seasons of Stranger Things (2016–2022), and of Judith Grimes in the fourth season of The Walking Dead (2013–2016).

== Career ==
The twins began acting as babies in 2013. Their first role was Judith Grimes in the fourth season of The Walking Dead (2013–2016). Later, they appeared as Holly Wheeler in the first four seasons of Stranger Things (2016–2022). For the fifth season, they were replaced by Nell Fisher.

They have also appeared as young Tiffany in the film Galveston (2018).

== Filmography ==
=== Film ===
Year	Title	Role	Notes
2016	The Divergent Series: Allegiant	Perfexia Toddler	
2018	Forever My Girl	Sam's daughter	
2018	Galveston	Young Tiffany	
2018	Trial by Fire	Older Karmon	

=== Television ===
Year	Title	Role	Notes
2013–2016	The Walking Dead	Judith Grimes	Uncredited (season 4)
2016–2022	Stranger Things	Holly Wheeler	Recurring role (seasons 1–4)
