= List of Stranger Things characters =

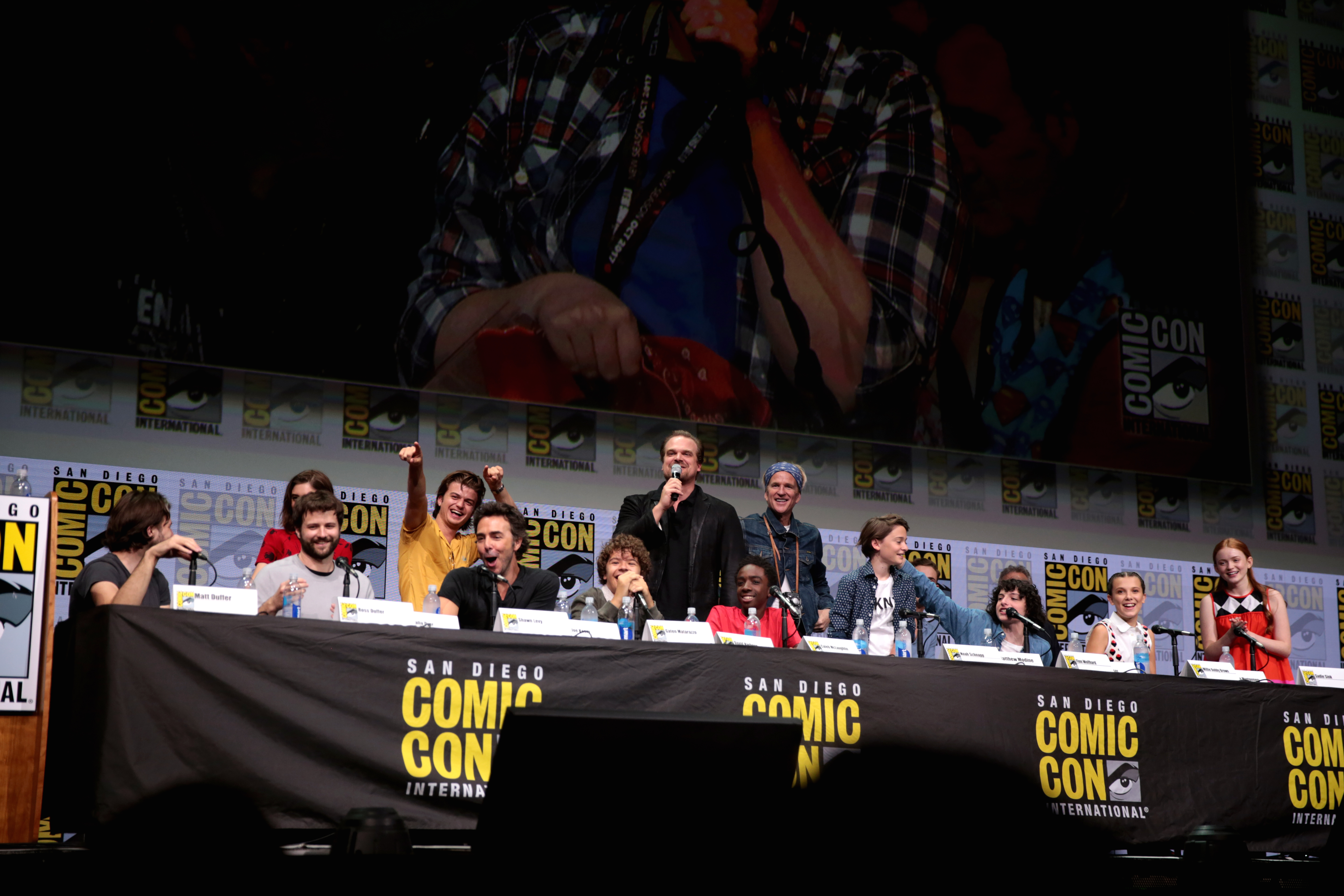
The Duffer Brothers and the cast of season 2 of Stranger Things at the 2017 San Diego Comic-Con

This is a list of characters from the American science fiction horror television series Stranger Things, created by the Duffer Brothers, and its animated spin-off Stranger Things: Tales from '85.

The original series is set in the 1980s and follows a group of children in the town of Hawkins, Indiana, as they confront supernatural forces tied to the disappearance of a young boy named Will Byers. Each season advances chronologically from 1983 to 1987, depicting the group's maturation while they face escalating threats connected to an alternate dimension. The first season premiered on Netflix on July 15, 2016, followed by the second on October 27, 2017, and the third on July 4, 2019. The fourth season was released in two volumes in May and July 2022. The fifth and final season was released in three segments between November and December 2025.

The ensemble cast includes Winona Ryder, David Harbour, Finn Wolfhard, Millie Bobby Brown, Gaten Matarazzo, Caleb McLaughlin, Natalia Dyer, Charlie Heaton, Cara Buono, and Matthew Modine. Noah Schnapp and Joe Keery recurred in the first season before being promoted to the main cast for the second, with Sadie Sink, Dacre Montgomery, Sean Astin, and Paul Reiser also joining. Maya Hawke joined the main cast in the third season while Priah Ferguson was promoted after recurring in the second season. Brett Gelman recurred in the second and third seasons before being promoted to the main cast in the fourth. Jamie Campbell Bower recurred in the fourth season before being promoted to the main cast in the fifth. Linda Hamilton and Nell Fisher joined the main cast for the fifth season.

This list includes the series' main cast, all guest stars deemed to have had recurring roles throughout the series, and any other guest who is otherwise notable.

== Overview ==
=== Main cast ===
Character	Portrayed by	Seasons				
Character	Portrayed by	1	2	3	4	5
Joyce Byers	Winona Ryder (Note: Birdy portrays young Joyce in the fifth season.)	Main	Main	Main	Main	Main
Jim Hopper	David Harbour	Main	Main	Main	Main	Main
Mike Wheeler	Finn Wolfhard (Note: Max Rackenberg portrays young Mike in the fifth season.)	Main	Main	Main	Main	Main
Eleven / Jane Hopper	Millie Bobby Brown (Note: Charlotte and Clara Ward portray young Eleven in the second season and Martie Blair portrays young Eleven in the fourth season.)	Main	Main	Main	Main	Main
Dustin Henderson	Gaten Matarazzo	Main	Main	Main	Main	Main
Lucas Sinclair	Caleb McLaughlin	Main	Main	Main	Main	Main
Nancy Wheeler	Natalia Dyer	Main	Main	Main	Main	Main
Jonathan Byers	Charlie Heaton (Note: Graham Harvey portrays young Jonathan in the fifth season.)	Main	Main	Main	Main	Main
Karen Wheeler	Cara Buono	Main	Main	Main	Also starring	Main
Martin Brenner	Matthew Modine	Main	Featured		Main	
Will Byers	Noah Schnapp (Note: Luke Kokotek and Miles Marthaller portray young Will in the fifth season.)	Also starring	Main	Main	Main	Main
Max Mayfield	Sadie Sink (Note: Jacey Sink portrays young Max in the third season and Belle Henry portrays young Max in the fourth season.)		Main	Main	Main	Main
Steve Harrington	Joe Keery	Also starring	Main	Main	Main	Main
Billy Hargrove	Dacre Montgomery (Note: Christopher Convery portrays young Billy in the third season.)		Main	Main	Also starring	
Sam Owens	Paul Reiser		Main	Featured	Main	
Bob Newby	Sean Astin		Main	Featured		
Robin Buckley	Maya Hawke			Main	Main	Main
Erica Sinclair	Priah Ferguson		Co-star	Main	Main	Main
Murray Bauman	Brett Gelman		Also starring	Also starring	Main	Main
Dr. Kay	Linda Hamilton					Main
Henry Creel / One / Vecna / Mr. Whatsit	Jamie Campbell Bower (Note: Raphael Luce portrays young Henry in the fourth and fifth seasons, and Maksime Blatt also portrays young Henry in the fifth season.)				Also starring	Main
Holly Wheeler	Anniston Price	Co-star	Co-star	Co-star	Co-star	
Holly Wheeler	Tinsley Price	Co-star	Co-star	Co-star	Co-star	
Holly Wheeler	Nell Fisher					Main (Note: Fisher is credited under the "also starring" bill for the first seven episodes of the fifth season, and with the main cast in the final episode.)

=== Also starring ===
Character	Portrayed by	Seasons				
Character	Portrayed by	1	2	3	4	5
Ted Wheeler	Joe Chrest	Also starring	Also starring	Also starring	Also starring	Also starring
Calvin Powell	Rob Morgan	Also starring	Also starring	Also starring	Also starring	
Phil Callahan	John Paul Reynolds	Also starring	Also starring	Also starring	Also starring	
Terry Ives	Aimee Mullins	Also starring	Also starring			
Lonnie Byers	Ross Partridge	Also starring				
Barbara "Barb" Holland	Shannon Purser	Also starring				
Tommy H.	Chester Rushing	Recurring	Also starring			
Carol	Chelsea Talmadge	Recurring	Also starring			
Scott Clarke	Randy Havens	Recurring	Also starring	Also starring		Also starring
Claudia Henderson	Catherine Curtin		Also starring	Also starring	Also starring	Guest
Kali Prasad / Eight	Linnea Berthelsen		Also starring			Also starring
Bruce	Jake Busey			Also starring		
Grigori	Andrey Ivchenko			Also starring		
Tom Holloway	Michael Park			Also starring		
Heather Holloway	Francesca Reale			Also starring		
Alexei	Alec Utgoff			Also starring		
Mayor Larry Kline	Cary Elwes			Also starring		
Doris Driscoll	Peggy Miley			Also starring		
Suzie Bingham	Gabriella Pizzolo			Also starring	Also starring	
Argyle	Eduardo Franco				Also starring	
Eddie Munson	Joseph Quinn				Also starring	
Jason Carver	Mason Dye				Also starring	
Vickie Dunne	Amybeth McNulty				Also starring	Also starring
Angela	Elodie Grace Orkin				Also starring	
Ten	Christian Ganiere				Also starring	
Two	Tristan Spohn				Also starring	
Patrick McKinney	Myles Truitt				Also starring	
Lt. Colonel Jack Sullivan	Sherman Augustus				Also starring	Also starring
Dmitri "Enzo" Antonov	Tom Wlaschiha				Also starring	
Melnikov	Vaidotas Martinaitis				Also starring	
Wayne Munson	Joel Stoffer				Also starring	
Yuri Ismaylov	Nikola Đuričko				Also starring	
Oleg	Pasha Lychnikoff				Also starring	
Ivan	Nikolai Nikolaeff				Also starring	
Sergeant Luis Ramirez	Emanuel Borria					Also starring
Lt. Robert Akers	Alex Breaux					Also starring
Derek Turnbow	Jake Connelly					Also starring

=== Recurring cast ===
Character	Portrayed by	Seasons				
Character	Portrayed by	1	2	3	4	5
Florence	Susan Shalhoub Larkin	Recurring	Recurring	Guest		
Connie Frazier	Catherine Dyer	Recurring				
Lead Agent	Tobias Jelinek	Recurring				
James	Cade Jones	Recurring				
Troy	Peyton Wich	Recurring				
Sue Sinclair	Karen Ceesay	Guest	Recurring		Recurring	Guest
Charles Sinclair	Arnell Powell	Guest	Recurring		Recurring	Guest
Susan Hargrove	Jennifer Marshall		Recurring		Recurring	
Stacey	Sydney Bullock		Recurring	Recurring		Guest
Andy	Clayton Johnson				Recurring	Guest
Chance	Hunter Romanillos				Recurring	Guest
Agent Stinson	Paris Benjamin				Recurring	
Ms. Kelly	Regina Ting Chen				Recurring	
Mary	Calista Craig					Recurring
Miss Harris	Hope Hynes Love					Recurring
Debbie Miller	Eden Stephens					Recurring
Glenn	Gianlucca Gazzo					Recurring
Thomas	Carson Minniear					Recurring
Rebecca	Birdie Borria					Recurring
Wendy	Alyse Elna Lewis					Recurring

== Main characters ==
=== Joyce Byers ===
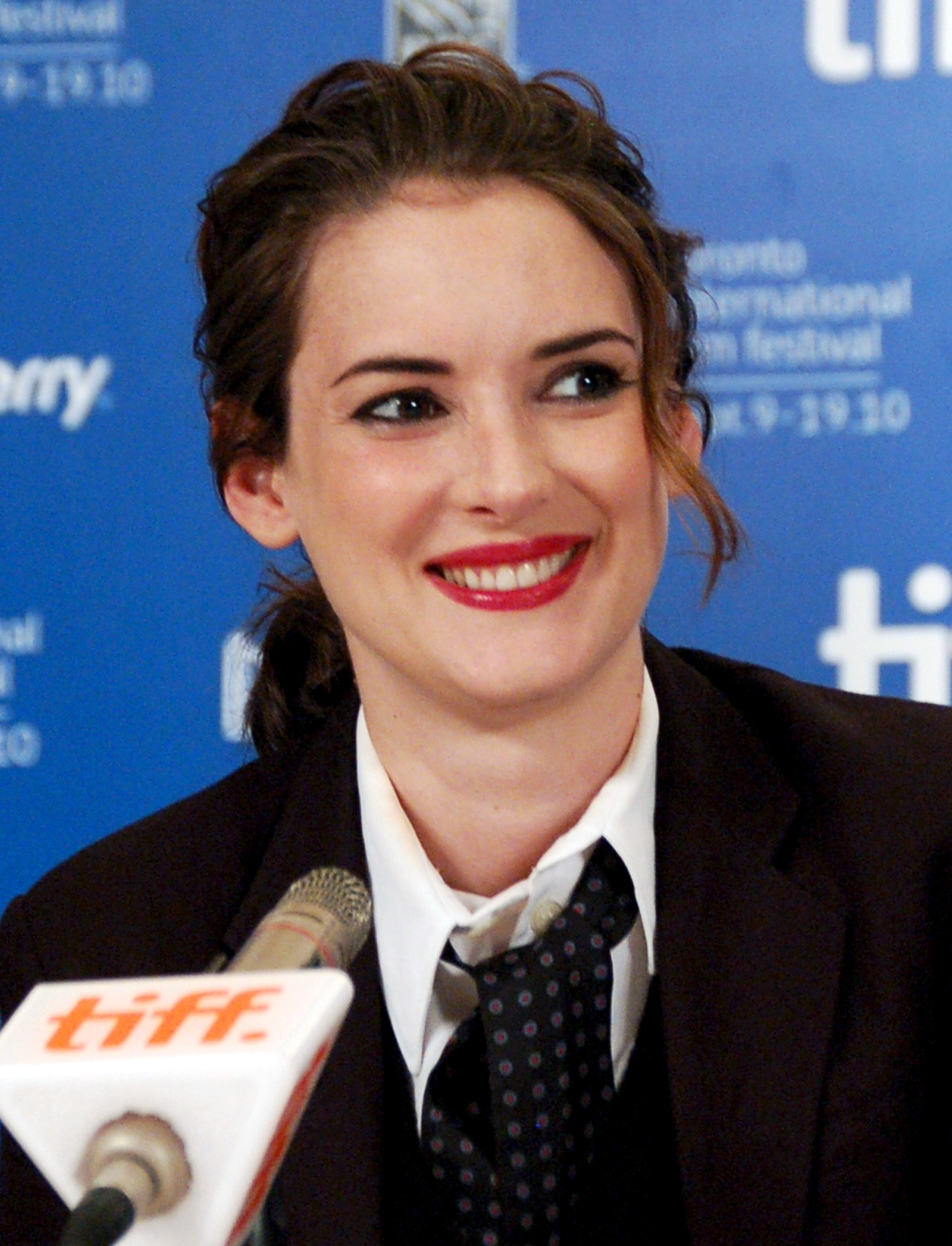
Winona Ryder in 2010

Portrayed by Winona Ryder, Joyce Byers (née Maldonado) is the mother of Jonathan and Will and is divorced from their father Lonnie. Joyce is a very caring and strong-willed woman who works as a retail clerk at Melvald's General Store in downtown Hawkins. She was born and raised in Hawkins and she attended Hawkins High School with Jim Hopper and Bob Newby.

In season one, Joyce refuses to believe Will is dead after he mysteriously disappears, interpreting paranormal events as proof he is alive and pushing Hopper to continue the investigation. She learns Hawkins Lab opened a gate to the Upside Down and helps Hopper rescue Will from there.

In season two, Joyce focuses on Will's recovery and plays a central role in freeing him from possession by the Mind Flayer. She dates Bob during this time, only for him to die in a Demogorgon attack at Hawkins Lab.

In season three, Joyce, grieving Bob, uncovers a Russian operation beneath Starcourt Mall while Hopper begins pursuing her romantically. She helps infiltrate the lab and ultimately shuts down the machine opening the gate to the Upside Down, an act that leaves Hopper presumed dead. Joyce then takes in Eleven and moves the Byers family to California.

In season four, Joyce learns Hopper is alive and, with Murray, travels to the Soviet Union to rescue him from a prison camp. She reunites with Hopper after helping him escape, and the two affirm their romantic feelings for one another before returning to Hawkins, where Vecna's actions have torn open rifts to the Upside Down.

In season five, Joyce aids Hopper's covert missions into the Upside Down and helps train Eleven while protecting Will, whose link to Vecna resurfaces. She later aids the group's final efforts against Vecna and delivers the killing blow after his defeat. 18 months later, Joyce accepts Hopper's proposal, and with her children grown, plans to move with him to Montauk, New York.

=== Jim Hopper ===
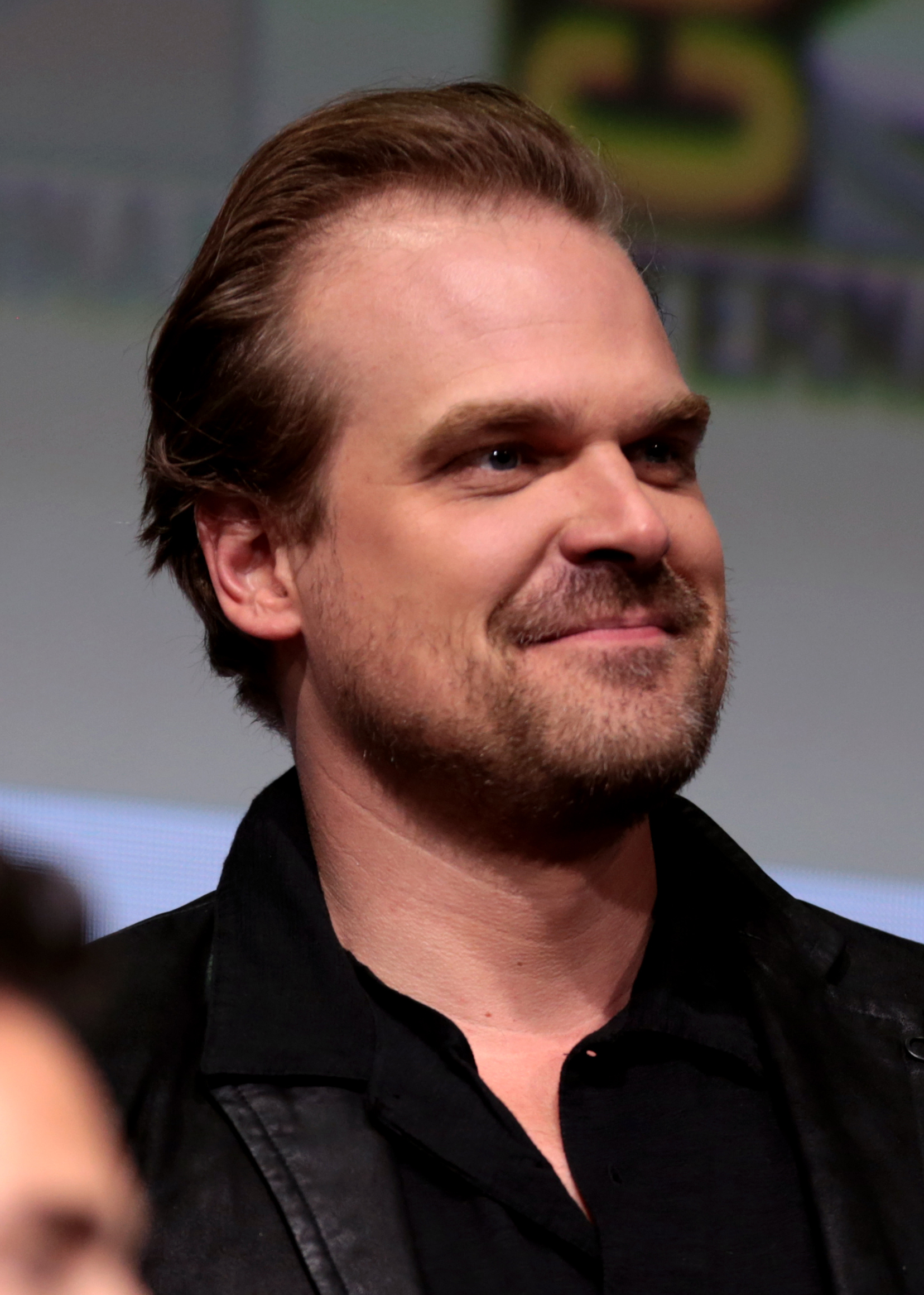
David Harbour in 2017

Portrayed by David Harbour, Jim Hopper, nicknamed "Hop," is the Hawkins chief of police. Hopper has lived in Hawkins nearly all his life, having attended high school with Joyce and Bob. A veteran of the Vietnam War, Hopper divorced after his young daughter, Sarah, died of cancer linked to his work with Agent Orange during the war, which caused him to lapse into alcoholism. Eventually, he grows to be more responsible, saving Will from the Upside Down as well as taking Eleven in as his adopted daughter.

In season two, Hopper continues sheltering Eleven without telling anyone else, including Mike Wheeler. He soon investigates pumpkins that were mysteriously rotting and eventually discovers vines that travel underneath Hawkins but he is trapped there but soon rescued. When he was at Hawkins Lab when the demodogs were invading, Hopper attempts to rescue everyone. When he was at the Byers house, Eleven and Hopper reunite and together, they close the gate underneath the Hawkins Lab, essentially cutting off the Mind Flayer from the world.

In season three, Hopper attempts to control Mike and Eleven's relationship while pursuing Joyce romantically, and becomes involved in investigating Russian activity beneath Starcourt Mall. He helps uncover a Soviet machine opening a gate to the Upside Down and is presumed dead.

In season four, Hopper is revealed to have survived and is imprisoned in a Soviet labor camp in Kamchatka. After a failed escape attempt and recapture, he is reunited with Joyce and Murray, who travel to the Soviet Union to rescue him, and he and Joyce affirm their feelings for each other. Hopper survives a Demogorgon attack and helps destroy other Demogorgons at the prison to weaken Vecna's influence. He then returns to Hawkins and reunites with Eleven as rifts to the Upside Down begin to spread.

In season five, with Hawkins under military quarantine, Hopper carries out covert reconnaissance missions into the Upside Down and trains Eleven while she is pursued by the military. Stranded in the Upside Down during a mission, he works with Eleven to infiltrate the military's research facility there, where they find and rescue Kali and enlist her aid in freeing kidnapped children trapped in Vecna's mind. After Vecna's defeat and the collapse of the Upside Down, Eleven remains behind against Hopper's wishes, presumably perishing along with the Upside Down. 18 months later, Hopper proposes to Joyce, and the two plan to move to Montauk, New York, where he has accepted a position as chief of police.

=== Mike Wheeler ===
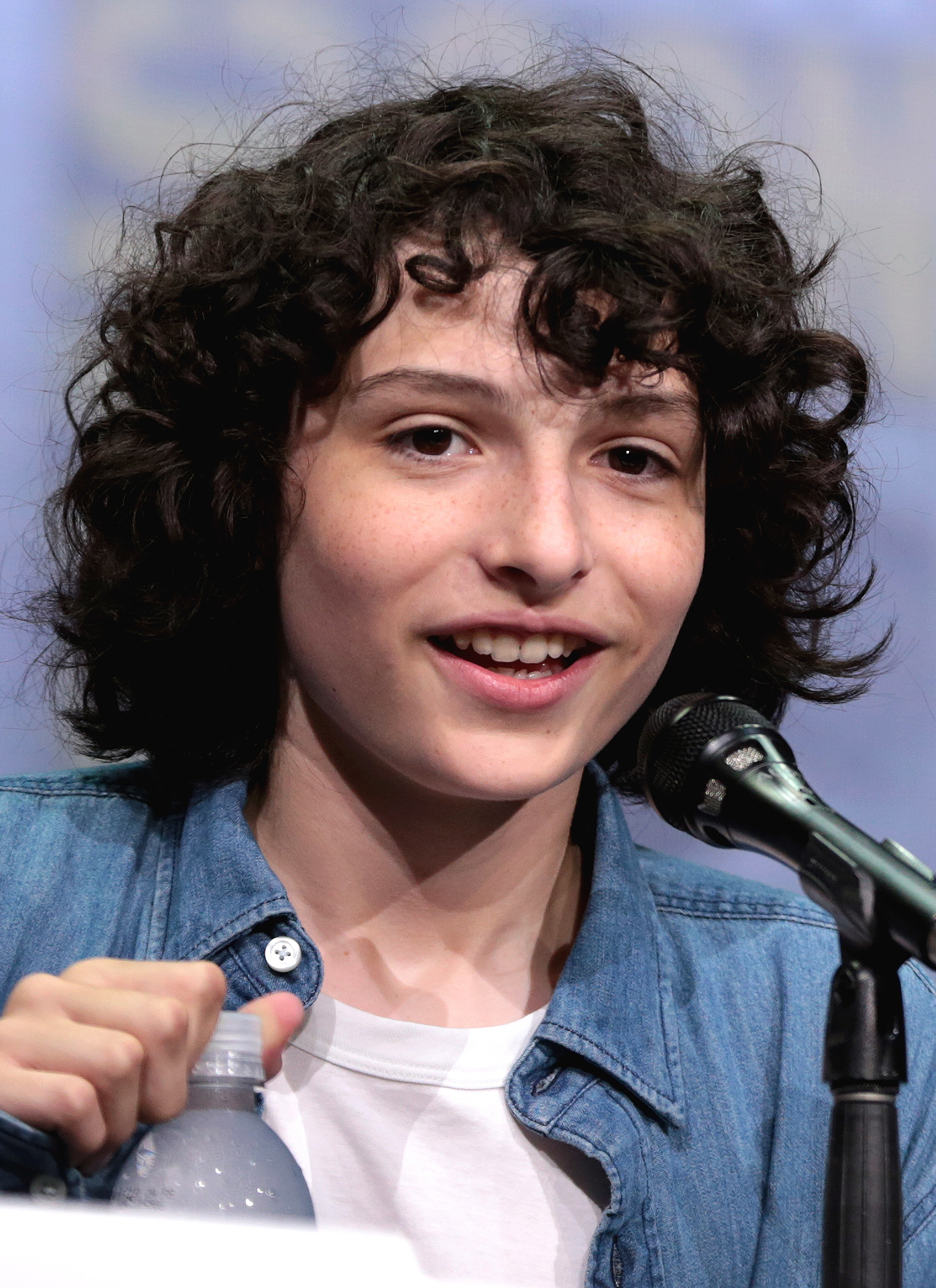
Finn Wolfhard in 2017

Portrayed by Finn Wolfhard, Mike Wheeler is the son of Karen and Ted, younger brother of Nancy and older brother of Holly, and is friends with Lucas, Dustin, and Will. Mike is an intelligent and conscientious student who is committed to Lucas, Dustin, and Will. In their Dungeons & Dragons party, Mike is their Paladin and usually plays the role of Dungeon Master.

In season one, Mike befriends Eleven after she escapes Hawkins Lab and shelters her while helping search for Will. Acting as the group's leader, Mike believes Eleven's claims about the Upside Down, protects her from government agents, and helps her locate Will. He forms a close bond with Eleven and develops romantic feelings for her, before she disappears after defeating a Demogorgon in Hawkins Middle School.

In season two, Mike struggles with Eleven's absence, calling out to her nightly and becoming withdrawn and irritable. He supports Will as Will begins suffering from Upside Down-related episodes and helps the group determine that the gate at Hawkins Lab must be closed. When Eleven returns, Mike is relieved but angry at Hopper for hiding her. Before she leaves to seal the gate, Mike tells her he cannot lose her again, and they attend the Snow Ball together afterward.

In season three, Mike and Eleven begin dating, but Hopper forces them apart, leading to conflict and a brief breakup. Mike reconciles with Eleven during the Mind Flayer's return to Hawkins, expressing concern over the toll her powers take, and struggles to tell her he loves her. After the Battle of Starcourt, Eleven moves away with the Byers family, telling Mike she loves him before leaving.

In season four, Mike joins the Dungeons & Dragons-themed Hellfire Club at school while maintaining a long-distance relationship with Eleven. Visiting her in California, he discovers she has been hiding severe bullying, and is separated from her again after she is arrested for assaulting her bully and subsequently taken by Dr. Owens. Mike escapes a military attack with Will, Argyle, and Jonathan, tracks Eleven to Nevada with the help of Dustin's ex-girlfriend Suzie, and aids her psychic confrontation with Vecna by professing his love to her, giving her the strength to fight back and save Max. The group then returns to Hawkins, finding it torn apart by rifts to the Upside Down.

In season five, with Hawkins under military quarantine, Mike helps coordinate Hopper's covert missions into the Upside Down. After Vecna kidnaps his sister Holly, Mike infiltrates a military base with his friends to rescue targeted children and is saved from a Demogorgon attack by Will, who discovers he has psychic powers linked to Vecna. Upon learning of Vecna's plans to merge Earth with the Abyss, Mike joins the final battle in which Vecna and the Mind Flayer are destroyed. Believing Eleven to be dead when the Upside Down collapses, a grieving Mike nearly skips his graduation before Hopper convinces him to attend. He then plays a final game of Dungeons & Dragons with his friends, telling them that he chooses to believe Eleven is still alive.

=== Eleven ===
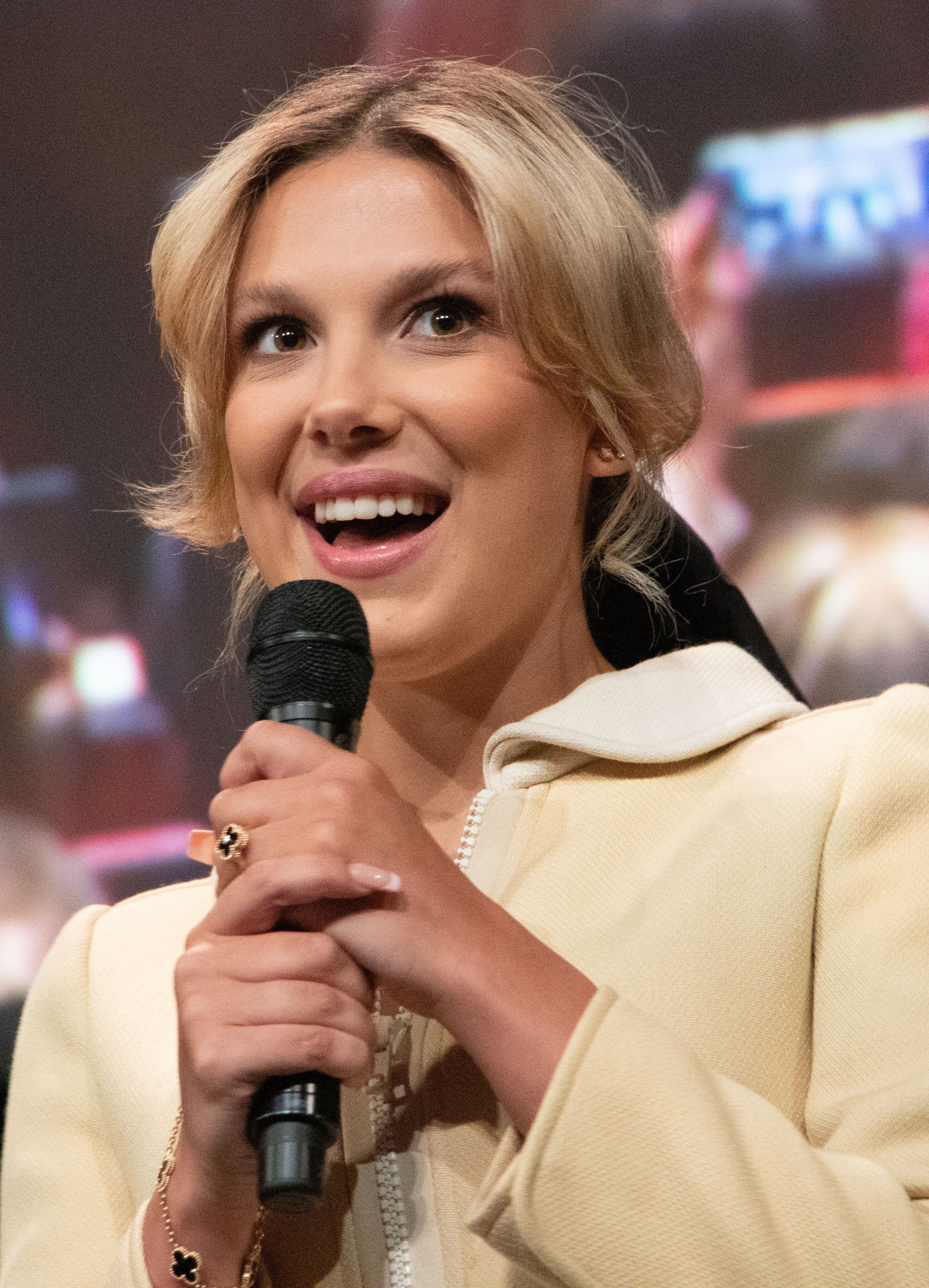
Millie Bobby Brown in 2022

Portrayed by Millie Bobby Brown, Eleven is a telekinetic girl. She later becomes Jim Hopper's adoptive daughter and Mike's girlfriend.

Born to Terry Ives and originally named Jane Ives, Eleven was abducted at birth by Dr. Martin Brenner and raised at Hawkins National Laboratory, where her telekinetic abilities were developed alongside other gifted children. In 1979, she was manipulated by Henry Creel (Subject One), who murdered the lab staff before Eleven defeated him and banished him to the Abyss, where he later became Vecna. The event left Eleven in a coma, resetting much of her memory and abilities. Eleven was then used as a test subject in Brenner's experiments to restore her powers, which Brenner used to search for Henry and to spy on the Soviets for the U.S. government; during one of the experiments, Eleven inadvertently made contact with a Demogorgon, creating a gateway from the Abyss to Earth known as the Upside Down and spawning a portal to the Upside Down in Hawkins Lab.

In season one, after escaping the lab in 1983, Eleven befriends Mike, Dustin, and Lucas and helps them locate Will Byers while evading Hawkins Lab agents. She kills a Demogorgon and is transported to the Upside Down.

In season two, she escapes the Upside Down and is taken in by Jim Hopper, who eventually adopts her. In 1984, she briefly leaves Hawkins to learn about her past and meets Terry Ives, her biological mother, Becky Ives, and eventually Kali (Subject Eight) before returning to close the gate to the Upside Down.

In season three, in 1985, Eleven begins dating Mike and helps defeat the Mind Flayer at Starcourt Mall, but loses her powers, and believes Hopper has died, prompting her move to California with the Byers family.

In season four, in 1986, Eleven endures bullying at Lenora Hills High School and is arrested after retaliating against her tormentor Angela. Dr. Owens takes her to a Nevada research facility, where Brenner and Dr. Owens helps her recover her powers by forcing her to relive suppressed memories of Hawkins Lab via a sensory deprivation chamber. After the facility is attacked by the U.S. Army and Brenner is killed, Eleven reunites with her friends and uses her restored abilities to confront Vecna, saving and resurrecting Max. She returns to Hawkins to find the town fractured by rifts to the Upside Down.

In season five, in 1987, with Hawkins under military quarantine, Eleven goes into hiding and later follows Hopper into the Upside Down after Vecna kidnaps several children. She rescues Kali from a military base, learns the origin of their powers, and enters Vecna's mind to free the captives. After Vecna's defeat, Eleven remains behind as the Upside Down collapses to prevent her abilities from being exploited. Her fate is left ambiguous, with Mike telling his friends that he believes that she survived and began a new life elsewhere.

=== Dustin Henderson ===
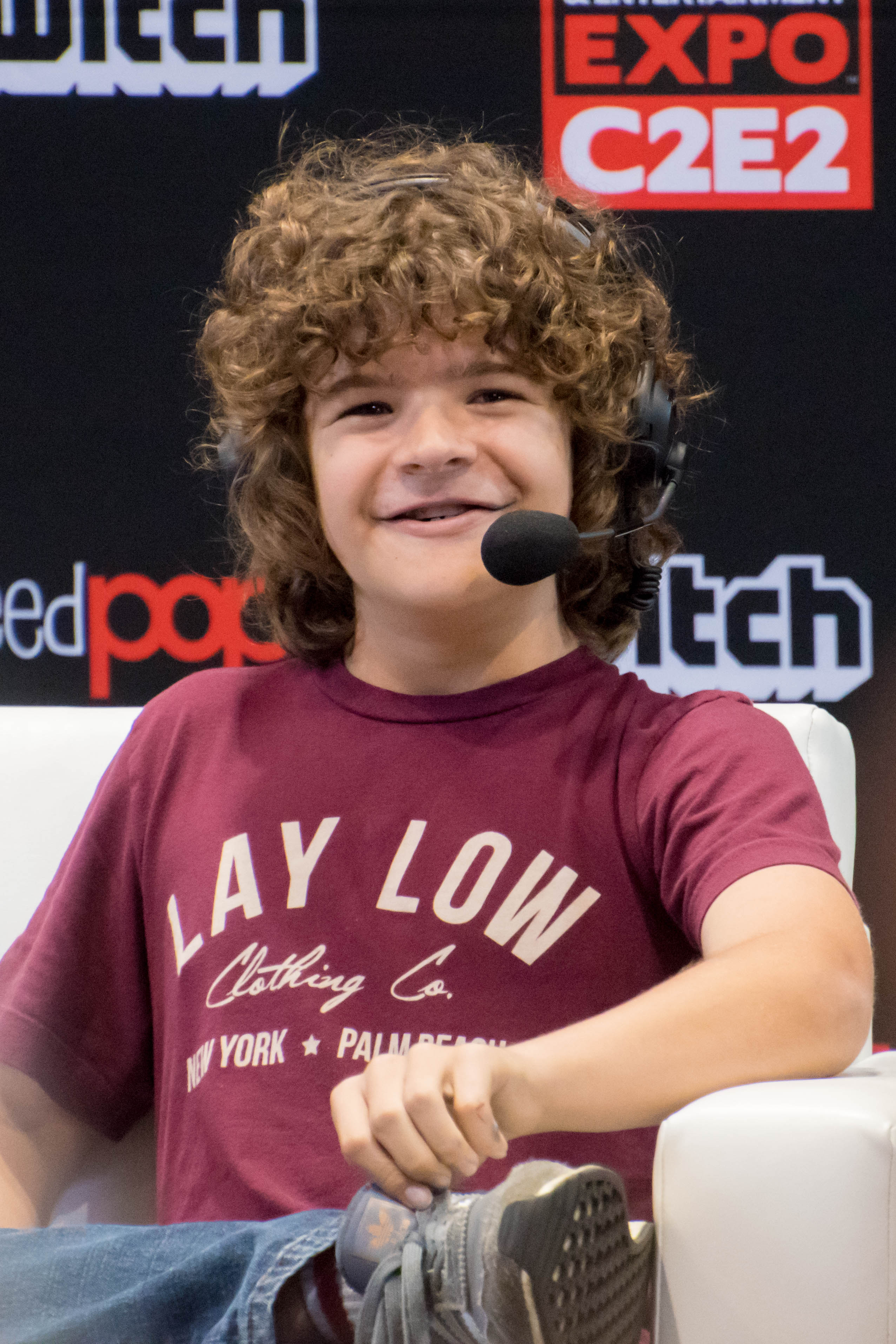
Gaten Matarazzo in 2017

Portrayed by Gaten Matarazzo, Dustin Henderson is an only child to his single mother Claudia Henderson. A friend of Mike, Will, and Lucas, he is a smart and quick-witted boy whose cleidocranial dysplasia causes him to lisp. In the Dungeons & Dragons party, Dustin is the Bard and has arguably the most extensive knowledge of the game, particularly the monsters. Dustin is also shown to possess a keen grasp of physics, often being the one to explain the science behind the paranormal happenings at Hawkins to his friends.

In season one, Dustin joins Mike, Lucas, and Eleven in uncovering the truth behind Will's disappearance and helps Eleven locate him in the Upside Down. In season two, Dustin secretly adopts a strange creature he names Dart, later discovering it is a juvenile Demogorgon. After Dart escapes, Dustin teams up with Steve to stop a Demogorgon invasion through the underground tunnels connected to the Upside Down, forming a close friendship with him in the process.

In season three, Dustin reveals he has a long-distance girlfriend, Suzie, whom his friends initially doubt exists. While using a homemade radio tower to contact her, Dustin accidentally intercepts a Russian transmission and helps Steve, Robin, and Erica uncover a secret Soviet base beneath Starcourt Mall.

In season four, Dustin joins the Hellfire Club and forms a close bond with its leader, Eddie Munson. After a series of supernatural murders, Dustin identifies the killer as Vecna and assists in the plan to stop him. While distracting Upside Down creatures with Eddie, Dustin witnesses Eddie's death and later informs Eddie's uncle of his sacrifice, calling him a hero.

In season five, Dustin struggles with grief over Eddie's death, becoming withdrawn and confrontational before rejoining his friends after Vecna kidnaps several children. He enters the Upside Down with Steve, Nancy, and Jonathan, where he uncovers research identifying the Upside Down as a gateway to the Abyss, and helps stop Vecna's plan to merge the dimensions together. After Vecna and the Mind Flayer are defeated and Eleven is believed dead in the destruction of the Upside Down; Dustin delivers a defiant valedictorian speech at graduation honoring Eddie, and later plays a final game of Dungeons & Dragons with his friends.

=== Lucas Sinclair ===
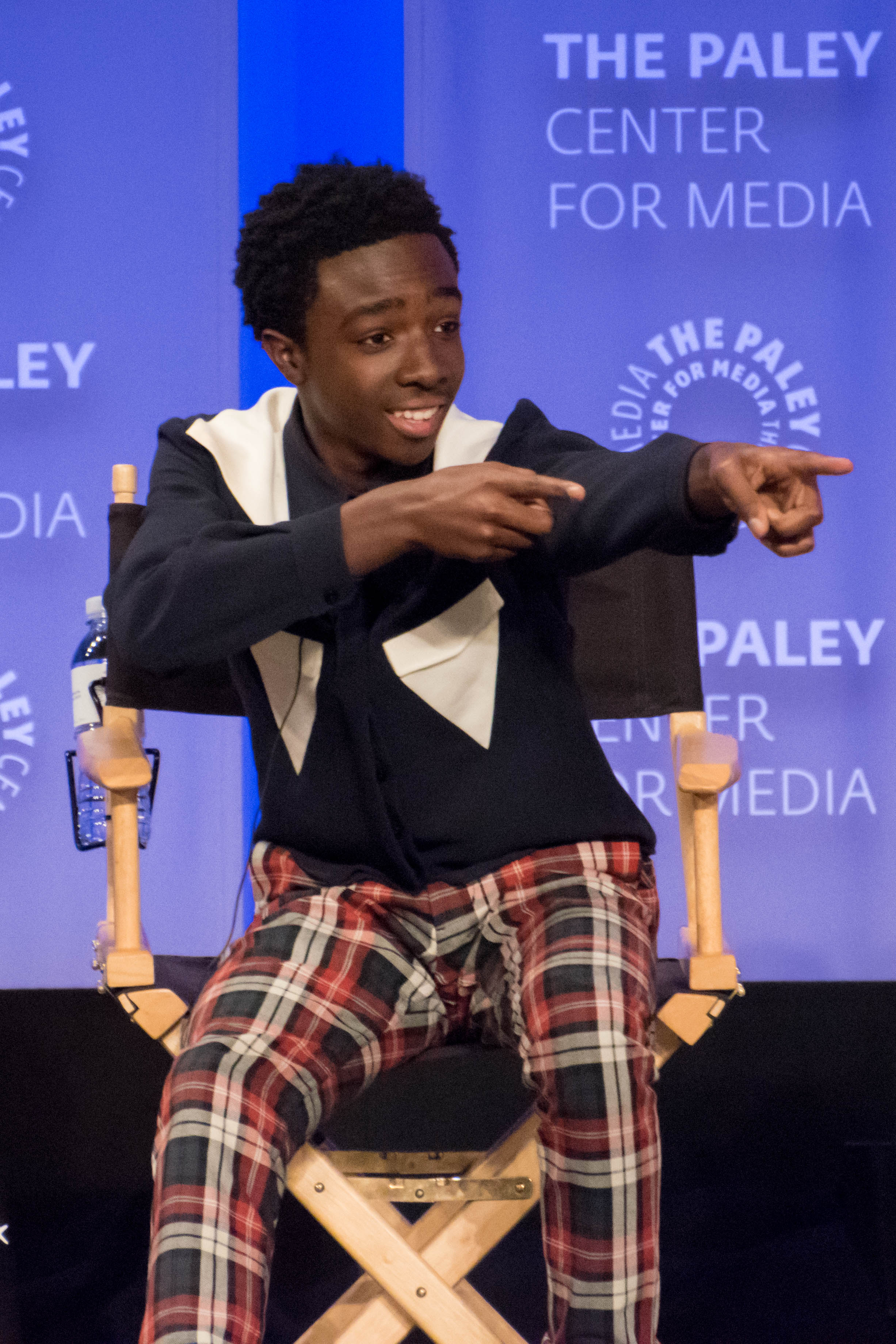
Caleb McLaughlin in 2018

Portrayed by Caleb McLaughlin, Lucas Sinclair is the eldest child of Sue and Charles, the elder brother of Erica, and a friend of Mike, Will, and Dustin. Often skeptical of the supernatural at first, Lucas consistently proves loyal and decisive in crises, evolving from a guarded outsider within the group into one of its most reliable fighters. His relationship with Max Mayfield and his responsibility as Erica's older brother further shape his maturity as Hawkins faces escalating threats from the Upside Down.

In season one, when Will disappears, Lucas joins Mike and Dustin in the search but is initially distrustful of Eleven and doubtful of her powers. Acting independently, he investigates Hawkins Lab and uncovers evidence of government involvement, confirming that the threat is supernatural in nature. Realizing Eleven is not their enemy, Lucas reconciles with his friends and helps defend them during the final confrontation with the Demogorgon, reuniting with Will afterward.

In season two, Lucas becomes close to newcomer Max Mayfield, forming a flirtatious rivalry with Dustin for her attention. As Will's connection to the Upside Down worsens, Lucas helps protect him and takes part in the plan to burn the tunnels beneath Hawkins, damaging the Mind Flayer's hold. At the school's annual dance, the Snow Ball, Lucas and Max share a kiss, beginning their romantic relationship.

In season three, Lucas and Max's relationship becomes volatile but affectionate as the group faces a new incarnation of the Mind Flayer. Lucas proposes using fireworks as a weapon, which proves critical in injuring the creature and buying time when it attacks the Starcourt Mall. After the death of Max's older brother Billy and the mall's destruction, Lucas supports Max as the group begins to drift apart.

In season four, entering high school, Lucas joins the basketball team to avoid being targeted as an outsider, putting him at odds with Mike and Dustin. When Vecna begins killing numerous students and marking Max as his next victim, Lucas leaves the team and fully recommits to his friends. He protects Max during her confrontation with Vecna, fighting basketball captain Jason Carver to stop him from interfering, and witnesses Max's apparent death before Eleven revives her.

In season five, with Hawkins destabilized by rifts to the Upside Down, Lucas remains by Max's side as she lies comatose, refusing to give up on her recovery. He aids in tracking Vecna, helping Hopper infiltrate the Upside Down via military transports, and fights to protect children from being kidnapped by Vecna. Lucas protects Max from an attack on the hospital by Demogorgons, before she awakens from her coma after escaping Vecna's mind lair. Lucas and his friends enter the Abyss, the origin of the Upside Down's creatures, where they defeat Vecna and another physical incarnation of the Mind Flayer. 18 months later, Lucas graduates high school with his friends and play a final game of Dungeons & Dragons with them.

=== Will Byers ===
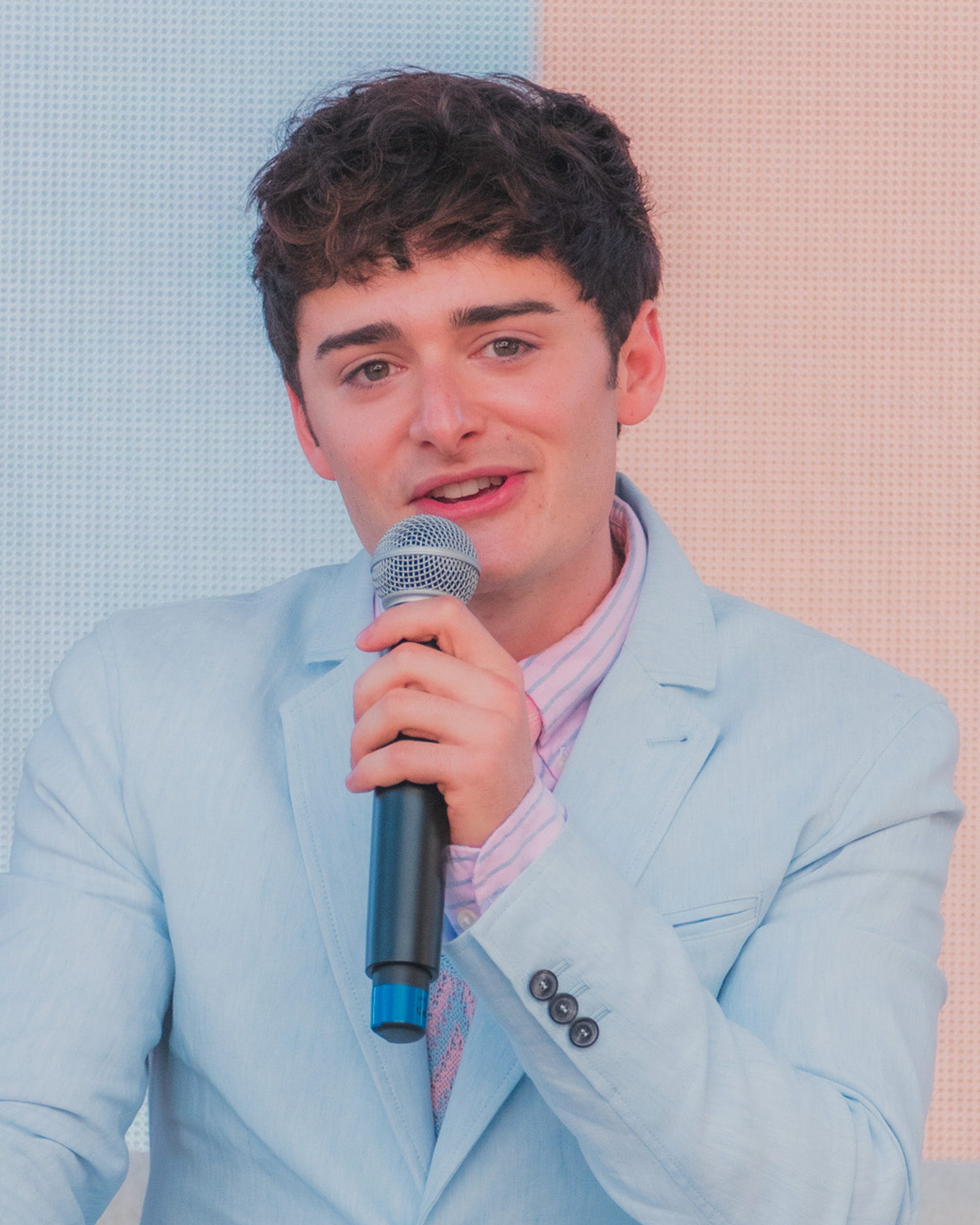
Noah Schnapp in 2025

Portrayed by Noah Schnapp, Will Byers, the younger brother of Jonathan and the youngest son of Joyce, is the shy, kind, timid, and often the most overlooked member of the party. In the group's Dungeons & Dragons party, Will is the wizard, but later occasionally plays the role of Dungeon Master; he is referred to as "Will the Wise". His mysterious disappearance sets the events of the series in motion. Schnapp was promoted to series regular for the second season, after recurring in the first.

In season one, Will disappears after being abducted by a Demogorgon and becomes trapped in the Upside Down. His disappearance prompts a search led by his mother Joyce, brother Jonathan, and friends Mike, Dustin, and Lucas, with help from Eleven. Will survives by hiding and communicating through lights before being rescued. He is returned to Hawkins but shows signs of lingering physical and psychological trauma.

In season two, Will begins experiencing episodes linked to the Upside Down, including visions and sensory disturbances connected to the Mind Flayer. He becomes temporarily possessed, allowing the Mind Flayer to spy on Hawkins through him. After the possession is exorcised, Will assists the group by describing the Mind Flayer and helping identify its underground tunnel network.

In season three, Will continues to feel residual effects from the Upside Down, sensing the Mind Flayer's presence before others, while growing apart from his friends over his lingering attachment to the childhood he felt he lost and that they are outgrowing. He warns the group of the Mind Flayer's return and helps them understand its behavior during the events leading up to the Battle of Starcourt. After the mall's destruction, Will moves away from Hawkins with Joyce, Jonathan, and Eleven.

In season four, living in California, Will supports Eleven as she struggles to adjust to a new life and later accompanies Mike and Jonathan during their efforts to reunite with her. He participates in the group's journey to Nevada and later returns to Hawkins as Vecna's attacks escalate. During this time, Will struggles with his repressed homosexuality and unrequited romantic feelings for Mike.

In season five, with Hawkins under military quarantine and rifts spreading from the Upside Down, Will becomes directly involved in efforts to stop Vecna's plan to merge dimensions. He develops psychic abilities linked to the Upside Down's hive mind, which he uses to kill Demogorgons before they can kill his friends, as well as assist in freeing the children Vecna kidnapped. Will comes out as gay to his family and friends along the way, realizing that overcoming his shame and fear over his sexuality help break Vecna's hold on him. He and Mike also affirm their friendship after Mike apologizes for not noticing Will's internal struggle. Will assists Eleven in the final confrontation with Vecna in the Abyss, culminating in Vecna's death and the destruction of the Upside Down. 18 months later, Will graduates high school with his friends and plays a final game of Dungeons & Dragons with them.

=== Nancy Wheeler ===
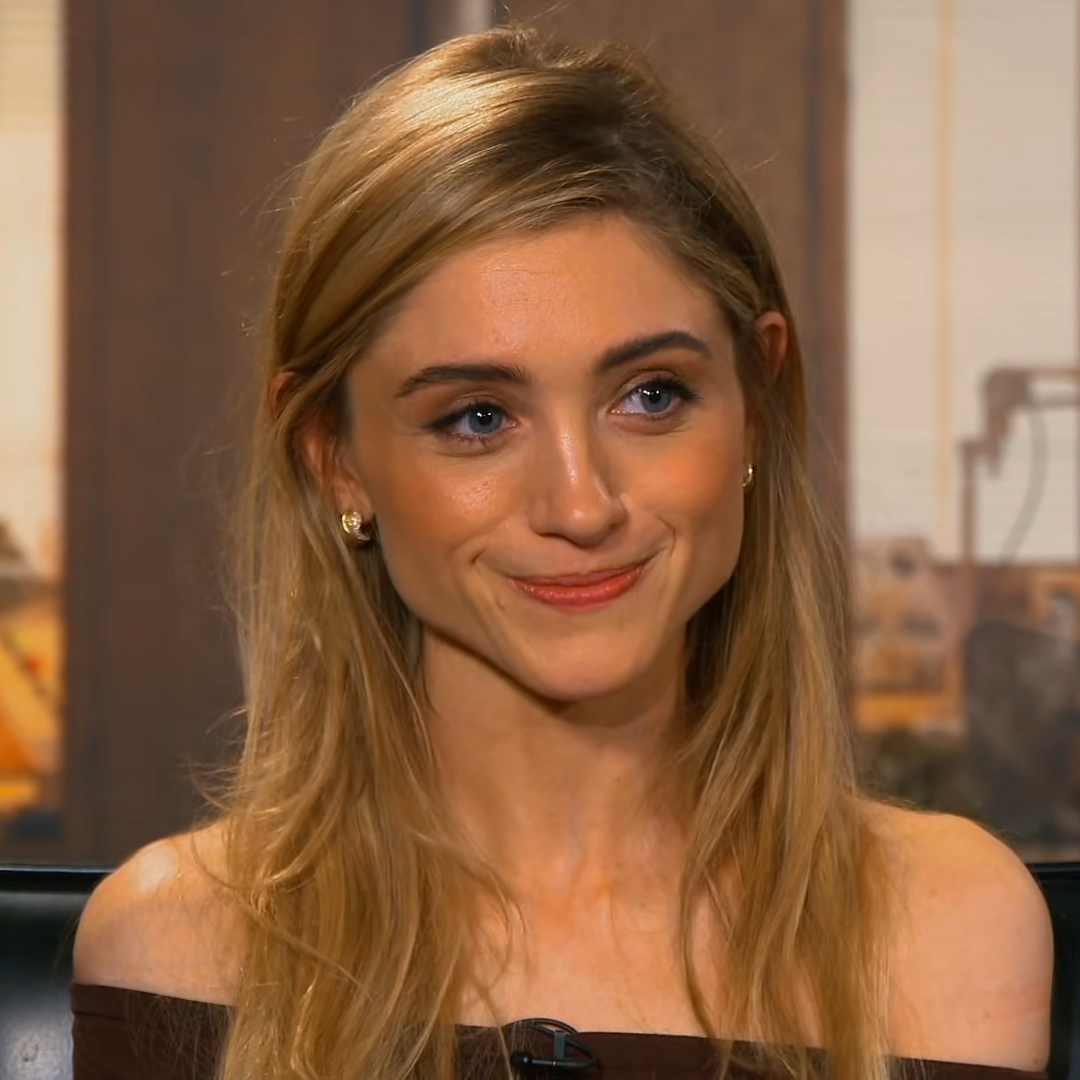
Natalia Dyer in 2025

Portrayed by Natalia Dyer, Nancy Wheeler is the oldest daughter of Karen and Ted and the older sister of Mike and Holly. Nancy begins the series as an aloof and stereotypical schoolgirl before becoming hardened in her fight against forces from the Upside Down, developing proficient skill with firearms. She also discovers her passion for investigative reporting.

In season one, Nancy is dating Steve Harrington and has grown distant from her former friends, including her best friend Barb Holland. After Barb disappears at a party hosted by Steve, Nancy becomes increasingly distressed and teams up with Jonathan Byers to investigate. Their search leads Nancy into the Upside Down and ultimately into a confrontation with the Demogorgon, which she helps injure with Jonathan and Steve. After Will Byers is rescued, Nancy reconciles with Steve and resumes their relationship.

In season two, Nancy remains deeply affected by Barb's death while continuing to date Steve, frequently visiting Barb's parents, who believe their daughter is still missing. After their relationship ends, Nancy works with Jonathan and conspiracy theorist Murray Bauman to expose Hawkins Laboratory's role in the supernatural events and Barb's death. Their efforts lead to the lab's shutdown, and Nancy and Jonathan begin a romantic relationship. She later assists in restraining Will to help free him from the Mind Flayer and attends the official funeral for the lab's victims including Barb.

In season three, Nancy and Jonathan intern at The Hawkins Post, where Nancy faces sexism and is dismissed by her colleagues despite uncovering evidence of the Mind Flayer's return. Continuing her investigation after being fired, Nancy helps expose the possession of Hawkins residents and joins the group in the battle against the Mind Flayer beneath Starcourt Mall. Following the destruction of the mall, Billy Hargrove's death, and Jim Hopper's apparent death, Nancy shares an emotional farewell with Jonathan as the Byers family leaves Hawkins.

In season four, Nancy prepares for college while working for the school newspaper and investigating a series of murders connected to a supernatural entity known as Vecna. She uncovers Victor Creel's history, helps determine that music can disrupt Vecna's control, and enters the Upside Down to rescue Steve Harrington. After being briefly possessed by Vecna and learning his true identity, Nancy participates in an unsuccessful attempt to kill him, witnessing the resulting devastation of Hawkins as the Upside Down begins to merge with the town.

In season five, Nancy helps run a local radio station that she and her friends use to coordinate coded “crawls” into the Upside Down in search of Vecna. While investigating Hawkins Lab in the Upside Down, she and Jonathan become trapped in a melting room and, believing they may die, end their romantic relationship before escaping with help from Dustin and Steve. A heavily armed Nancy leads the charge during the final confrontation with Vecna and the Mind Flayer in the Abyss. In the aftermath, the Upside Down is destroyed and life in Hawkins gradually returns to normal. Nancy drops out of Emerson College to pursue a career in journalism, while maintaining her friendships with Jonathan, Steve, and Robin.

=== Jonathan Byers ===
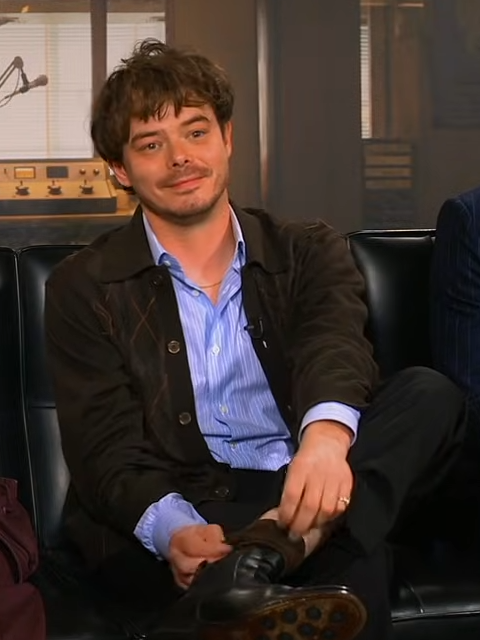
Charlie Heaton in 2025

Portrayed by Charlie Heaton, Jonathan Byers is the older brother of Will and the oldest son of Joyce and Lonnie. Portrayed as an antisocial young man interested in photography, Jonathan possesses strong family ties. Later, he becomes a romantic interest for Nancy.

In season one, Jonathan is an outcast at school and blames himself for Will's disappearance. While searching for him, Jonathan unknowingly witnesses Barbara Holland moments before she is taken into the Upside Down. He is bullied by Steve Harrington and his friends for secretly taking photographs, though Nancy sympathizes and later notices a creature in one of Jonathan's photos. Realizing it matches what his mother has described, Jonathan investigates with Nancy and narrowly escapes the monster. He defends Nancy during a fight with Steve and, after being arrested, is bailed out by Joyce Byers and Jim Hopper so he can help search for Will. Jonathan later fights the Demogorgon alongside Nancy and Steve.

In season two, Jonathan grows closer to Nancy while she is still dating Steve and remains concerned about Will's trauma. Wanting justice for Barbara, Jonathan helps Nancy secretly record Sam Owens admitting Hawkins Laboratory's role in her death. With Murray Bauman's help, they expose the lab, leading to its shutdown. Jonathan and Nancy begin a romantic relationship, and Jonathan assists in closing the gate to the Upside Down.

In season three, Jonathan and Nancy intern at the Hawkins Post and investigate strange behavior linked to the Mind Flayer. After being fired to stop their investigation, Jonathan helps fight townspeople possessed by the Flayer, including their boss, who he kills in self-defense. He joins the group in the battle at Starcourt Mall and helps Eleven remove a fragment of the Mind Flayer from her leg. After Hopper's apparent death, Jonathan moves to California with Joyce, Will, and Eleven.

In season four, Jonathan lives in California and befriends a stoner named Argyle while struggling with uncertainty about college and his future with Nancy. When Eleven is taken by Owens to regain her powers in a research facility, Jonathan helps locate the facility and rescue her. Learning of Vecna's attacks in Hawkins, he assists in building an isolation tank for Eleven and later returns to Hawkins, reuniting with Nancy as the Upside Down begins spreading into the town. During this time, he also intuits that Will is struggling with accepting his sexuality, and shows him support.

In season five, Jonathan helps operate a local radio station used to coordinate coded missions into the Upside Down in the search for Vecna. He and Steve frequently come at odds over their shared feelings for Nancy, who is growing apart from him. While investigating Hawkins Lab in the Upside Down, Jonathan and Nancy become trapped in a melting room and, believing they may not survive, agree to end their romantic relationship before escaping with help from their friends. Jonathan saves Steve's life which resolves their rivalry. Jonathan survives the final confrontation with Vecna and the destruction of the Upside Down, and afterward remains closely connected to the group as life in Hawkins begins to recover. He goes on to attend New York University as a film student, working on an anti-capitalist, cannibal project titled The Consumer, while maintaining his friendships with Nancy, Steve, and Robin.

=== Karen Wheeler ===
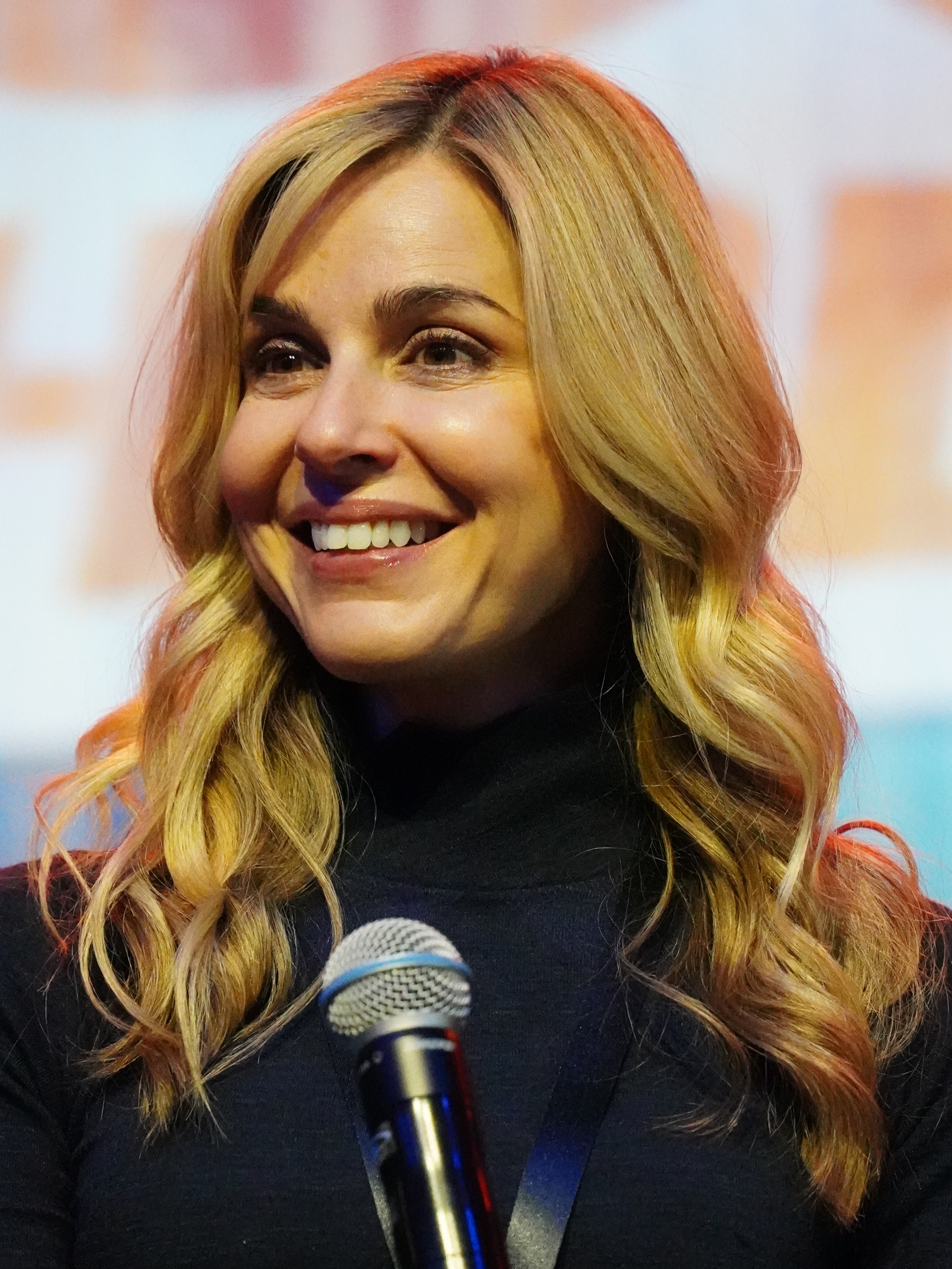
Cara Buono in 2026

Portrayed by Cara Buono, Karen Wheeler (née Childress) is the mother of Nancy, Mike, and Holly and the wife of Ted Wheeler. Although a loving mother at heart, she remains largely clueless about her children's activities up until the destruction of Hawkins by Vecna and often tries to directly connect with them rather than trying to understand them. Nancy believes she only married her husband to fit the image of a nuclear family.

At the end of the second season and the beginning of the third, she develops a sexual attraction towards Billy, partly out of boredom with her husband, but ultimately decides against acting on these feelings to avoid splitting her family apart; her brief submission to them, however, indirectly results in Billy being possessed by the Mind Flayer. Later, she finally connects with Nancy by encouraging her to continue pursuing the story she was fired for working on against her editor's orders. In season four, Karen remains clueless to her children's activities even after police involvement. She stays in Hawkins and suffers through the "earthquake" with Holly, which, unbeknownst to her, is the rift between Hawkins and the Upside Down opening.

In season five, Karen protects Holly from a Demogorgon, stabbing it with a wine bottle, before it brutally slashes her and lands her in the hospital. She later helps Mike and Nancy realize Holly's imaginary friend is Vecna. When Vecna sends Demogorgons to abduct Max from the hospital, Karen struggles down to the basement and kills them in an explosion she triggers by putting oxygen tanks in an industrial clothing dryer. She attempts to join Mike and his friends to find Holly, but is ultimately convinced to stay in the hospital due to her weak state. In the finale's epilogue, Karen has recovered and attends Mike's graduation alongside Ted, Nancy, and Holly.

=== Martin Brenner ===
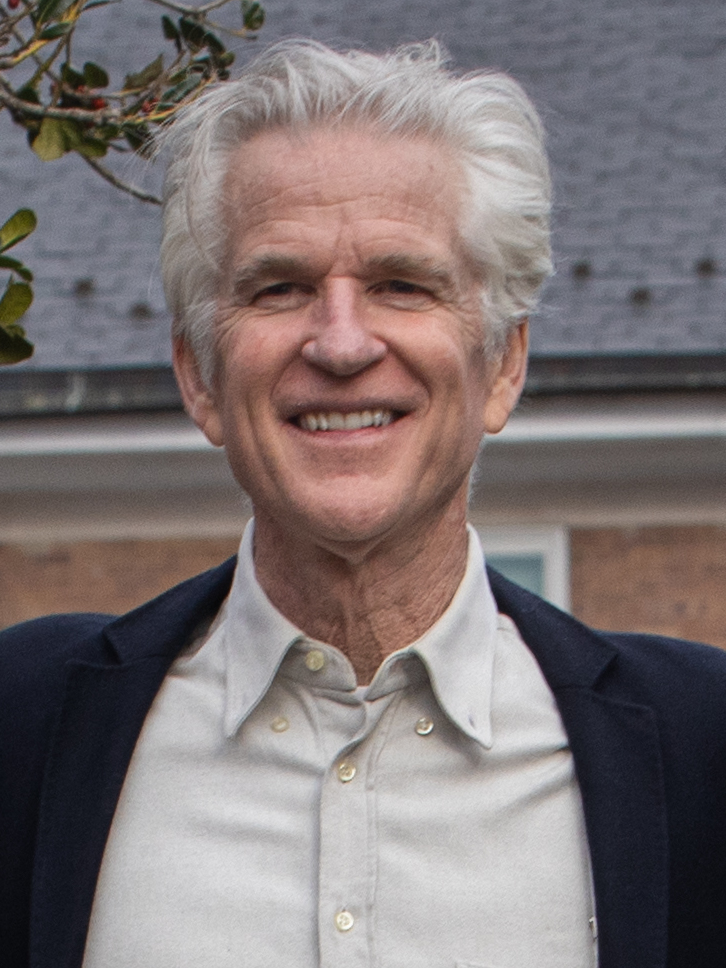
Matthew Modine in 2024

Portrayed by Matthew Modine, Dr. Martin Brenner, who is referred to as "Papa" by Eleven and the other children he experimented on, is the head scientist of Hawkins Laboratory and the experiments performed there. He is a callous and manipulative scientist, having abducted Eleven from her mother, Terry Ives, whom he later subjected to electroshock therapy to destroy her mind and thoughts. Brenner then put Eleven through numerous experiments, one of which saw her use her abilities to accidentally establish a link to the Upside Down. After Eleven escapes the lab, Brenner and his team hunt for her throughout Hawkins while covering up the actions of the Demogorgon they unknowingly let loose. Brenner is seemingly killed by the Demogorgon, though in season two, a former worker named Ray claims that Brenner is still alive during his attempt to plea for his life to Eleven and Kali.

In season four, Brenner is definitively revealed to be alive and working with Dr. Owens on a project called "Nina", which they hope can restore Eleven's powers. Nina is a specialized sensory deprivation tank and experimental drug that allow Eleven to vividly recall memories of her time in the lab. Flashbacks to 1979 show that Brenner was experimenting on at least 15 children (not counting the previously escaped Kali) alongside Eleven until all of them except for her were murdered by One / Henry, whom Eleven overpowered and banished to the Abyss, where he was transfigured into Vecna and joined the Mind Flayer's hive-mind. The exertion put Eleven in a coma that erased most of her memories and weakened her powers, which Brenner began attempting to restore. Brenner's experiments on Eleven throughout the first season are revealed to have been attempts to locate Henry, whose powers he sought to replicate in the other children.

The Nina project ultimately succeeds in restoring Eleven's powers, but U.S. Army troops led by Lt. Col. Jack Sullivan storm the facility and kill the staff, believing Eleven to be responsible for a string of murders in Hawkins (which were in fact committed by Vecna). Brenner is shot by a sniper and dies while attempting to escape with Eleven, who overpowers the Army.

=== Max Mayfield ===
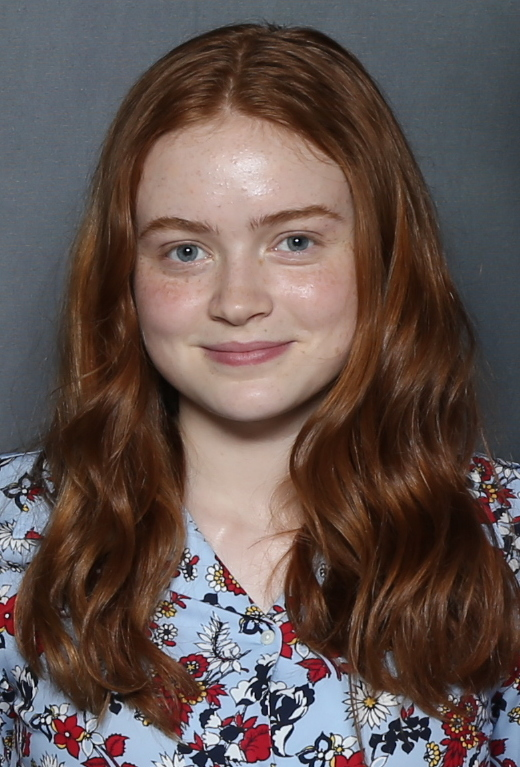
Sadie Sink in 2018

Portrayed by Sadie Sink, Maxine "Max" Mayfield is Susan Hargrove's biological daughter and Billy's younger stepsister. She is an avid skateboarder, and the tomboy of the group. Introduced in season two, Max catches Lucas's attention when it becomes known that she has the highest score in Dig Dug, and she helps him and his friends prevent an invasion of Demogorgons into Hawkins via underground tunnels. She also begins dating Lucas. Max is often shown at odds with Billy, who is domineering and verbally abusive to her.

In season three, Max is dating Lucas and becomes close friends with Eleven after giving her advice about Mike and helping her explore independence. She plays a key role in fighting the Mind Flayer's physical form and helps Eleven escape during the battle at Starcourt Mall. She watches Billy sacrifice himself to save Eleven from the Mind Flayer, traumatizing her.

In season four, Max struggles with severe grief and PTSD following Billy's death, withdrawing from her friends and family. She uncovers a connection between Vecna's victims and trauma, realizing she is his next target. After being saved from Vecna by her friends through music that reminds her of happier memories, Max later volunteers to act as bait in a plan to defeat him. Although Eleven prevents Vecna from killing her outright, Max dies briefly from her injuries and is revived, though she remains comatose.

In season five, Max has been comatose for 18 months. Her consciousness is revealed to be trapped in a psychic realm made of Vecna's memories, where she meets Holly Wheeler, whom Vecna has also trapped alongside eleven other children. Working with Holly, Max manages to escape and regains consciousness in the real world. Eleven and Kali help her re-enter Vecna's mind to help Holly and the other children escape. 18 months later, Max graduates high school with her friends, continues dating Lucas, and joins the party for a final game of Dungeons & Dragons.

=== Steve Harrington ===
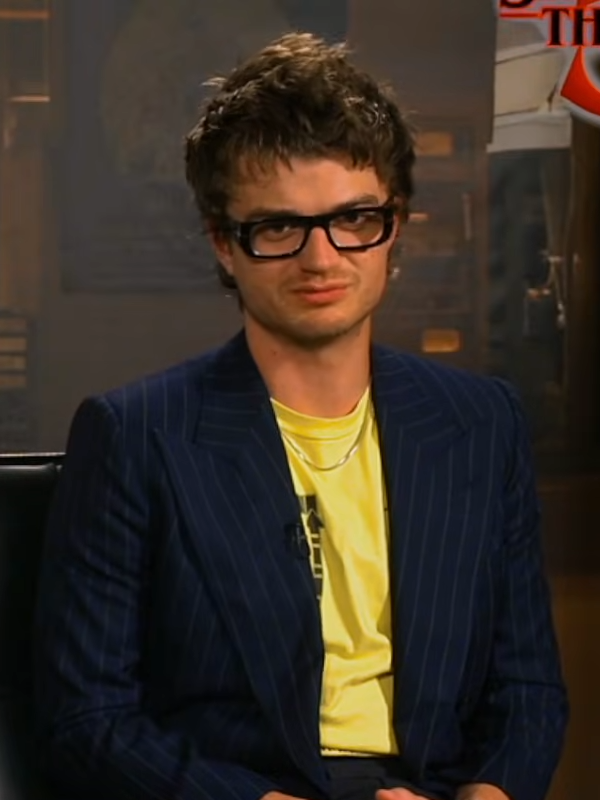
Joe Keery in 2025

Portrayed by Joe Keery, Steve Harrington, sometimes nicknamed "Steve The Hair Harrington", is a popular student at school. He tries to develop a relationship with Nancy and bullies Jonathan, though he later comes to regret this.

Keery was promoted to the main cast from the second season onwards, after recurring in the first. Steve then plays a more prominent role, developing a brotherly relationship with Dustin, and becoming a self-described "babysitter" for the main group of kids. Steve is the owner of what his friends call "The Bat", a baseball bat with multiple large nails driven into the head of it, originally made by Jonathan to fight the Demogorgon. Steve uses the bat to fight off a pack of adolescent Demogorgons that attack Hawkins in the second season.

In season three, Steve works at Starcourt Mall at an ice cream shop called Scoops Ahoy with Robin. He, Robin, and Dustin discover a secret Russian base under Starcourt Mall, where Erica, Lucas's sister, later joins. Steve, along with Robin, is later imprisoned by the Russians. He admits to having a crush on Robin but is rejected soon after learning that Robin is a lesbian.

In season four, Steve continues working with Robin, this time at Family Video, the local video store. He teams up with Robin, Nancy, Dustin, Max, and Lucas in investigating the Creel house to search for and learn about Vecna, and also locate Eddie. After they discover a new gate to the Upside Down in a lake, Steve dives down to investigate and is pulled through, but eventually makes it back with Nancy, Robin, and Eddie after they follow him in. During the final plan to defeat Vecna, Steve returns to the Creel house in the Upside Down with Nancy and Robin to kill Vecna, and the three succeed in severely maiming him with Molotov cocktails before he escapes. Vecna's plan nonetheless succeeds, and Steve, Robin, and Dustin volunteer to help townsfolk affected by the "earthquake" created by Vecna's gates.

In season five, Steve helps operate a local radio station used to coordinate coded missions into the Upside Down in the search for Vecna. He and Jonathan frequently come at odds over their shared feelings for Nancy, who is growing apart from Jonathan. While investigating Hawkins Lab in the Upside Down, Steve and Dustin argue over grief for Eddie's death, though they ultimately make up. During "Operation Beanstalk", a plan devised by Steve to rescue the children kidnapped by Vecna, Jonathan saves Steve from falling to death, which resolves their rivalry. Steve survives the final confrontation with Vecna and the destruction of the Upside Down, and afterward remains closely connected to the group as life in Hawkins begins to recover. He stays in town, becoming the baseball team coach and sex education teacher at Hawkins Middle School, dating a new girl named Kristen, while maintaining his friendships with Nancy, Jonathan, and Robin.

=== Billy Hargrove ===
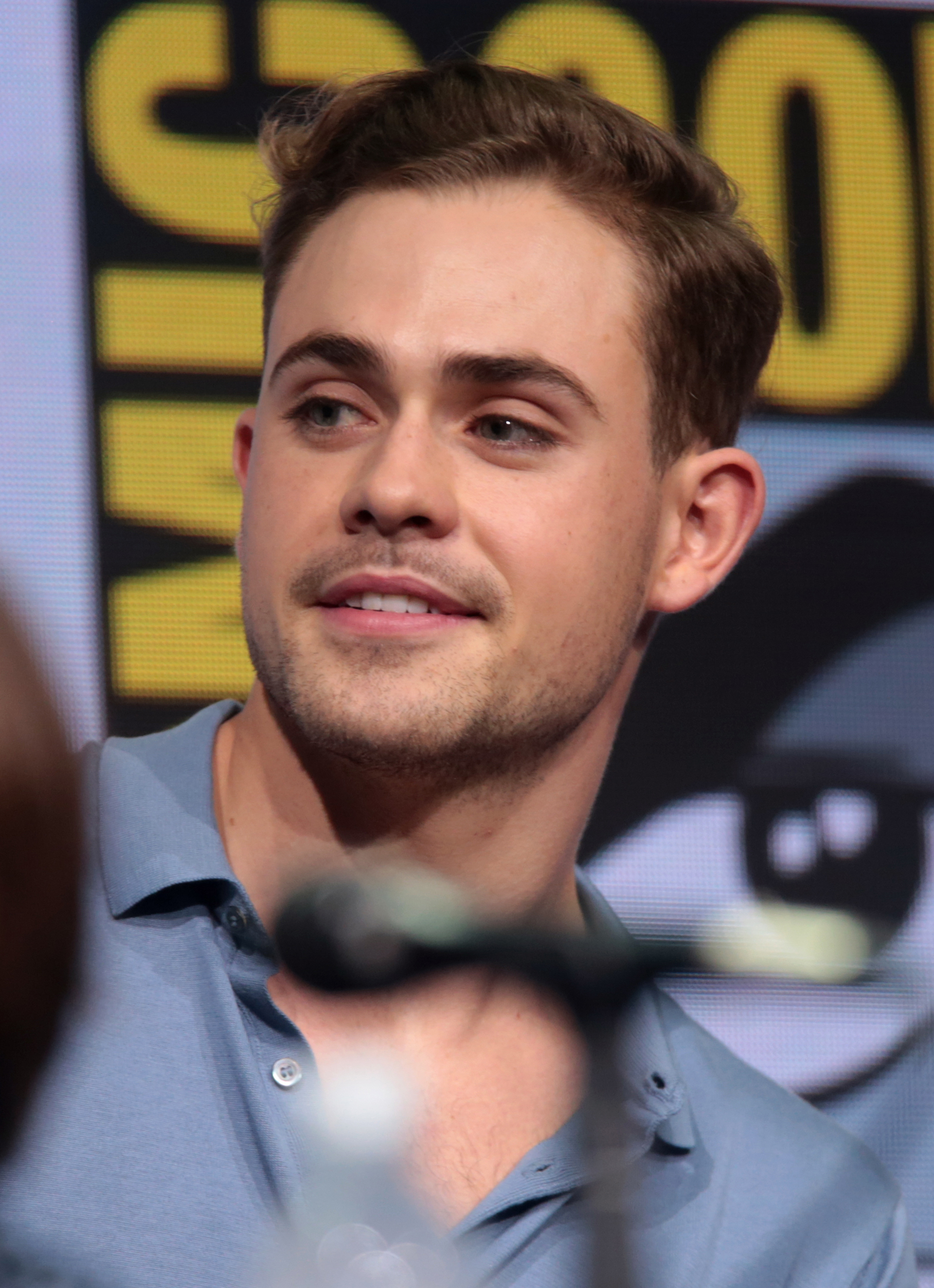
Dacre Montgomery in 2017

Portrayed by Dacre Montgomery, Billy Hargrove is the arrogant, abusive, careless and rash older step-brother of Max.

In season two, he taunts Steve at school and warns Max away from Lucas, in addition to pursuing an attempted affair with Mrs. Wheeler. His own behavior is revealed to be a consequence of the physical abuse he himself is subjected to by his father. Max threatens to hurt or possibly kill him if he does not leave her and her friends alone which he agrees to leave them alone.

In season three, Billy becomes the main unwilling host of the Mind Flayer after stumbling into the Upside Down. He collects people for it to possess for the biomass body it was building. Eleven, having looked into his memories earlier, reminds Billy of his happy memories with his mother before his father ruined it, allowing him to temporarily break free from the possession and sacrifice himself to save Eleven. After the Mind Flayer is defeated, Billy apologizes to Max for his wrongdoings before dying in her arms.

In season four, Billy appears as a hallucination when Max is put into a trance by Vecna, where Billy blames her for his death. Max reveals that a part of her is happy and sad that he died but that she still cared about him and loved him.

=== Bob Newby ===
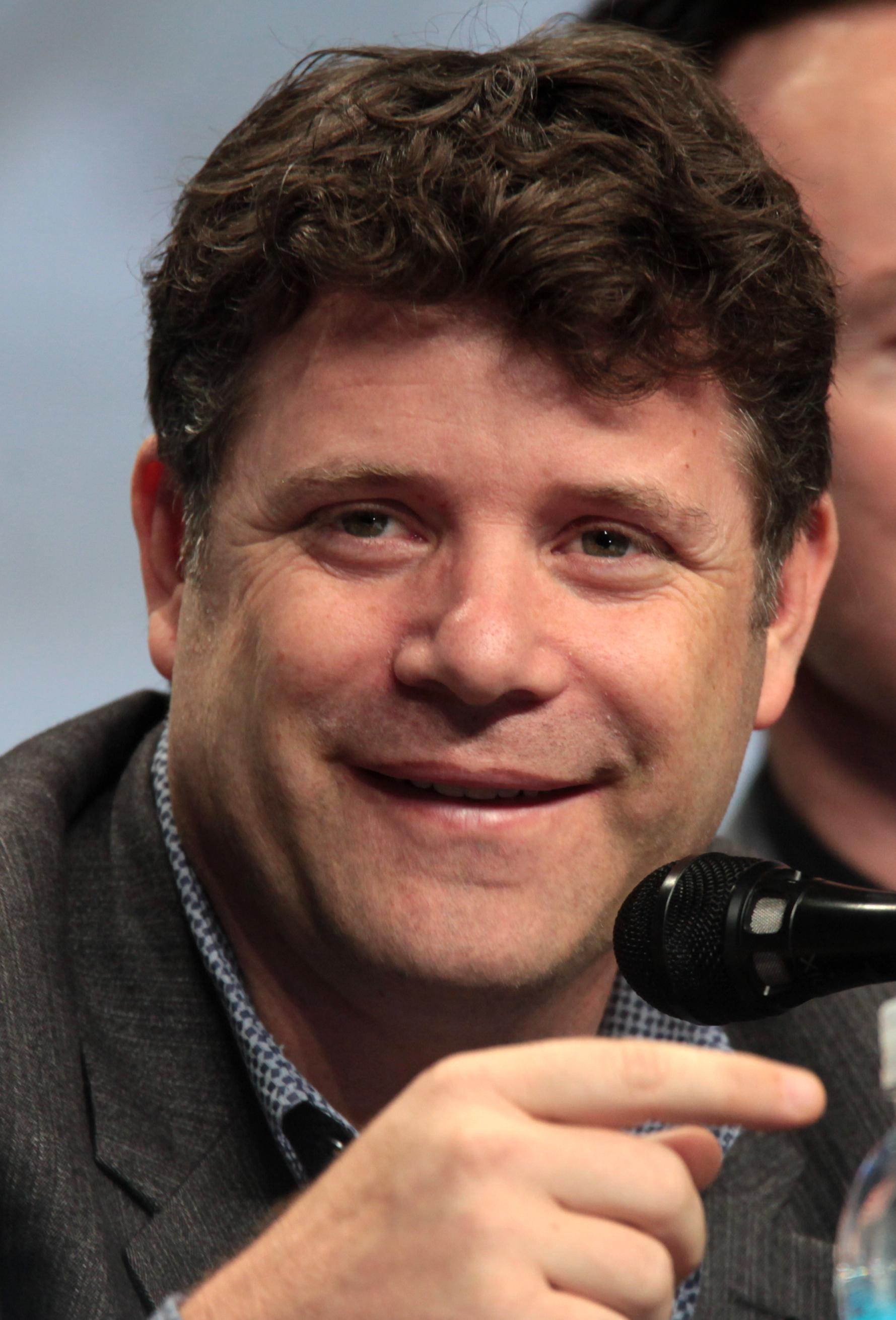
Sean Astin in 2014

Portrayed by Sean Astin, Bob Newby is a former classmate of Joyce and Hopper, who runs the Hawkins RadioShack, and becomes Joyce's boyfriend in season two, as well as a mentor figure for Will. An amiable man, he often refers to himself as a "superhero" and sees a future with the family.

The Byers initially try to keep him from learning about the Upside Down, but end up relying on his help to locate Hopper when he is able to use his puzzle-solving skills to decipher Will's drawings of the tunnels underneath Hawkins. He, Hopper, an unconscious Will, Mike, Joyce, and Owens are eventually trapped by the Mind Flayer in Hawkins Lab with the power out. As the only one capable of resetting the breakers and unlocking the doors, he volunteers to do so. After succeeding, he is attacked and killed by Demodogs, adolescent Demogorgons, in front of Joyce and Hopper. He appears in seasons three and five during Joyce's flashback memories of him.

=== Sam Owens ===
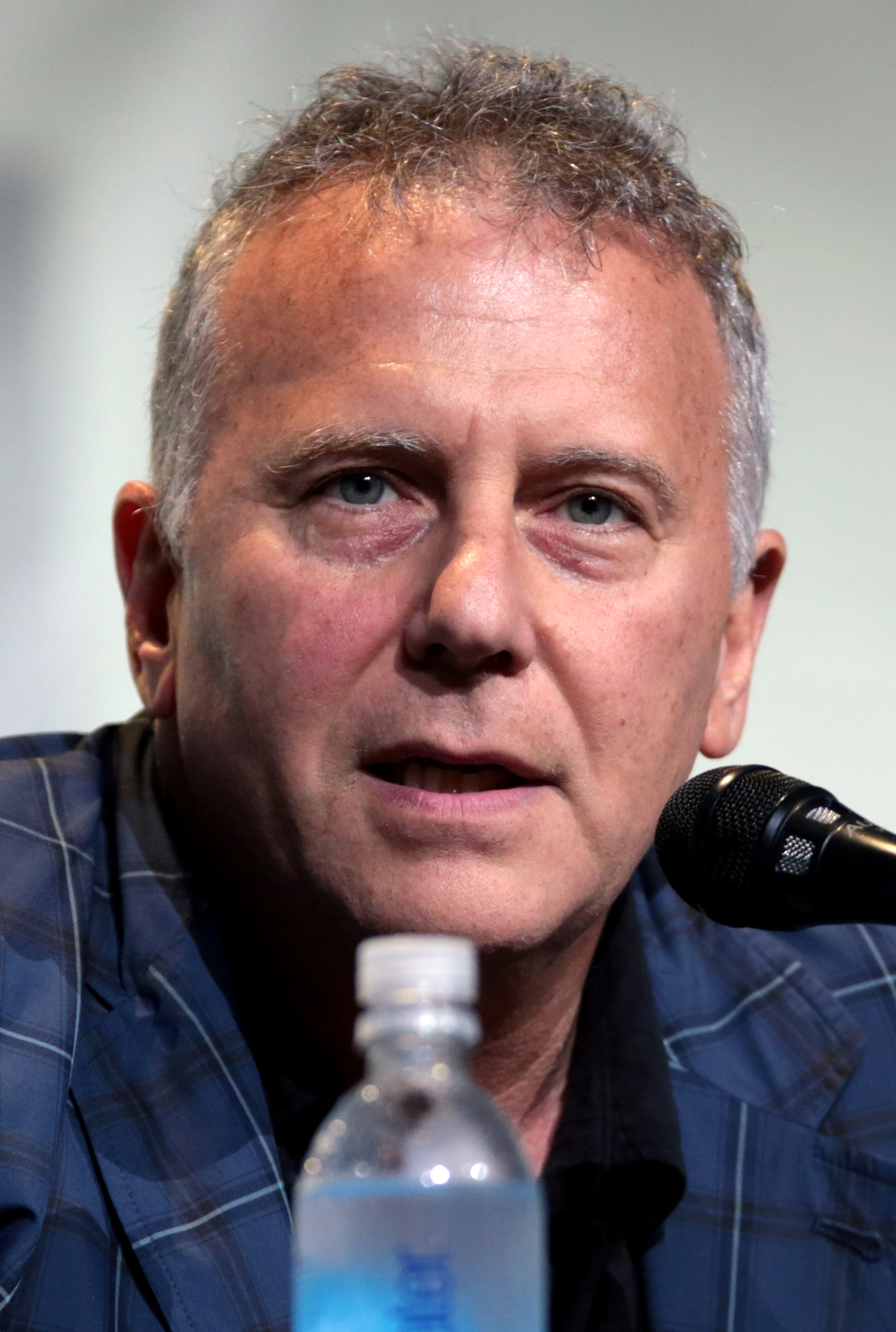
Paul Reiser in 2016

Portrayed by Paul Reiser, Dr. Sam Owens is a United States Department of Energy executive who replaces Brenner at Hawkins Laboratory. Owens is as committed to science research and stubborn as his predecessor, but much more empathetic to the residents of Hawkins. Owens is in charge of studying and treating Will's lingering traumatic episodes from the Upside Down. He is fired from the lab at the end of season two after it is attacked by monsters at the Upside Down, and provides Hopper with a birth certificate for Eleven naming her Hopper's adopted daughter.

In season three, Hopper calls Owens to inform him a gate has been opened in Hawkins. In the finale of the season, Owens and his men fly to Hawkins and raid the Russians' secret base. During the raid, Owens sees a gate inside the wall that is not fully closed.

In season four, Owens has secretly begun working with Brenner on a program called "NINA" that may be able to bring back Eleven's powers. Owens recruits Eleven to participate in the program after a string of murders in Hawkins; she initially revolted after learning of Brenner's involvement, but the brief resurgence of her powers during an escape attempt convinces her to stay. The project ultimately succeeds in restoring Eleven's powers, but U.S. Army forces led by Lt. Col. Jack Sullivan storm the facility, believing Eleven to be responsible for the Hawkins murders. Sullivan attempts to force Eleven's whereabouts out of Owens, but Eleven destroys the Army's vehicles.

Owens is not seen, mentioned or alluded to in season five, leaving his fate unknown.

=== Robin Buckley ===
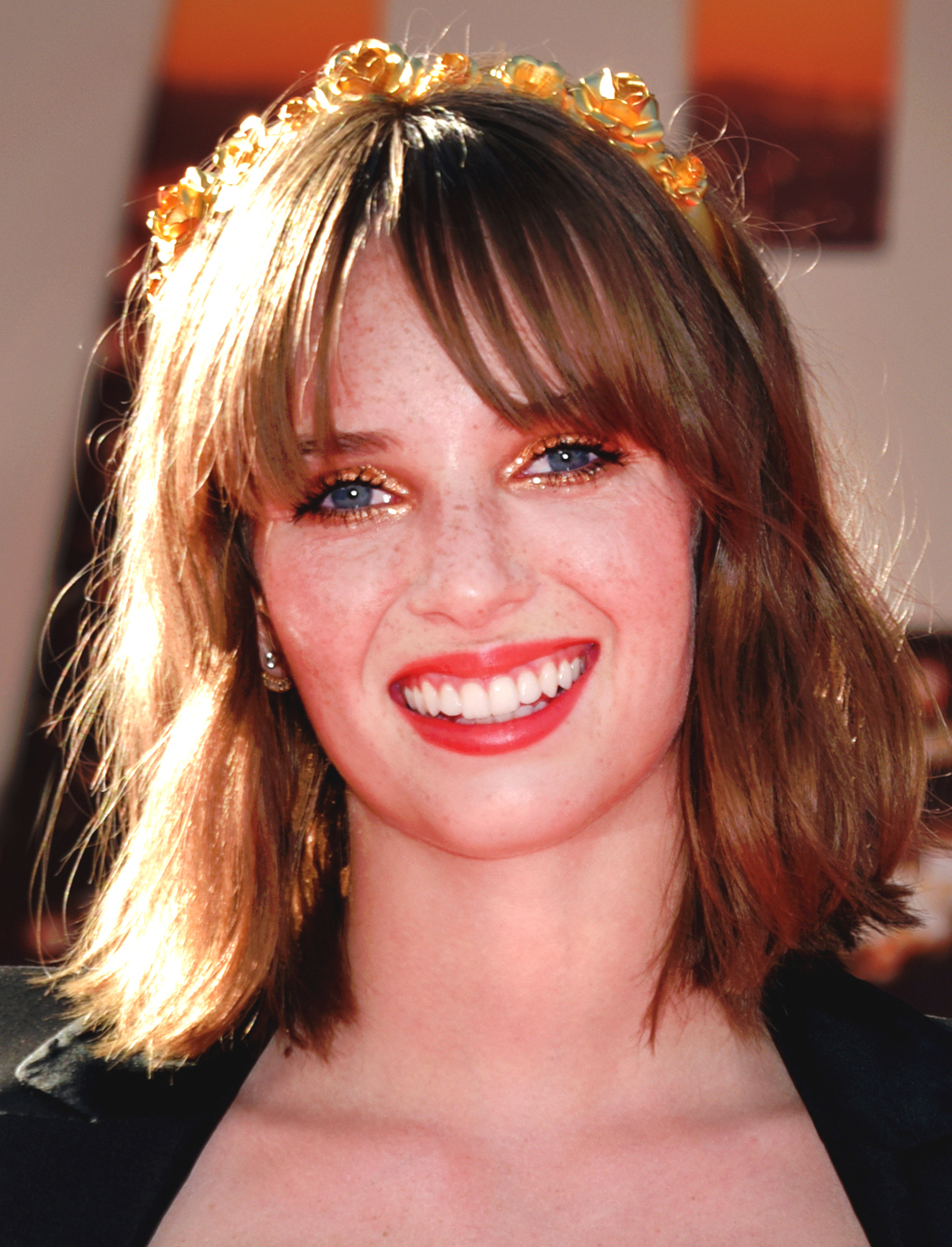
Maya Hawke in 2019

Portrayed by Maya Hawke, Robin Buckley is Steve's coworker at the Starcourt Mall's ice cream parlor, Scoops Ahoy!. Robin decodes a Russian radio message and finds the base along with Steve, Dustin, and Erica. She tells Steve she was obsessed with him in high school, but only because Tammy Thompson had a crush on him, thus revealing that she is a lesbian.

In season four, Robin continues working with Steve, but at a local video store, where she reveals her encyclopedic familiarity with films. She has a crush on classmate Vickie. After the first murder was committed by Vecna, Robin, along with Steve, Dustin, Max, and Nancy locate Eddie. After that, Robin and Nancy look up information on Victor Creel in a library, learning that Victor blamed his family's murders on a demon, which they believe to be Vecna. The two pretend to be psychology students and visit him at Pennhurst Asylum, where he recounts his family's murders. Later, she goes with Nancy and Steve to the Creel house in the Upside Down as part of their plan to defeat Vecna. During the last episode of season 4, Robin and Vickie hit it off.

In season five, she yet again works with Steve, this time at the local radio station, and is secretly dating Vickie, who is now a candy striper at the local hospital.

=== Erica Sinclair ===
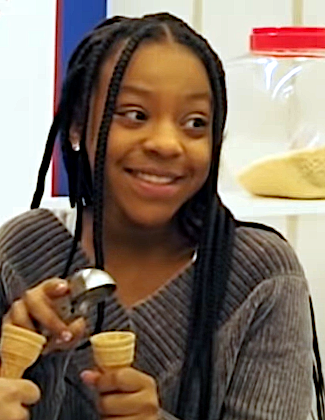
Priah Ferguson in 2019

Portrayed by Priah Ferguson, Erica Sinclair is Sue and Charles' youngest child and is Lucas' younger sister. She was introduced in the second season as a recurring character and promoted to series regular in the third season. She aids Dustin, Steve, and Robin in infiltrating the Russian base beneath Starcourt Mall. During these events, Dustin convinces Erica that, like himself and his friends, she is a nerd and that she should embrace that. At the end of the third season, she is given Will's Dungeons & Dragons manuals. She is very snarky, foul-mouthed, sassy and often thinks of Lucas and his friends as nerds, though she is also very brave and can be nice at times. In season four, she has embraced her nerdy side and joins the Hawkins High School's Hellfire Club in her brother's place after demonstrating proficient knowledge of Dungeons & Dragons. She serves as a lookout and communicator between the many groups in their plan to defeat Vecna. In season five, she becomes fond of Mr. Clark's class and successfully drugs the Turnbow family. Erica later assists Dustin in his valedictorian speech.

=== Murray Bauman ===
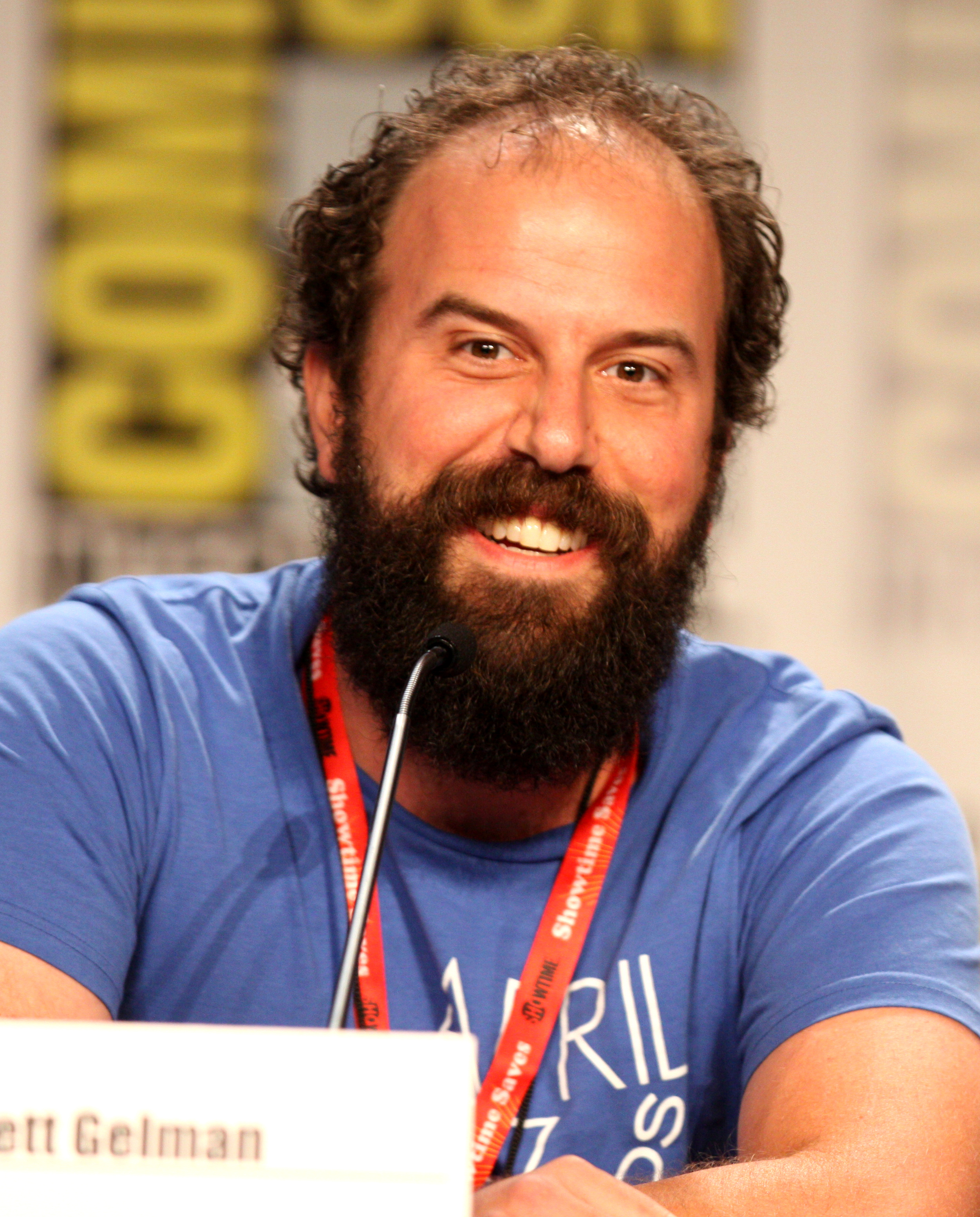
Brett Gelman in 2011

Portrayed by Brett Gelman, Murray Bauman is a private investigator and conspiracy theorist hired to investigate Barbara Holland's disappearance. He was first introduced in season two as a freelance journalist who previously worked for the Chicago Sun-Times. He assists Nancy and Jonathan in their mission to shut down Hawkins National Laboratory.

In season three, he helps Joyce and Hopper infiltrate the secret underground base in Starcourt Mall, where the Soviets had been building a machine capable of opening a gate to the Upside Down. He is also shown to be fluent in Russian. In season 4, he and Joyce travel to Kamchatka to rescue Hopper from imprisonment. There, he disguises himself as Yuri Ismaylov to rescue Hopper and burns Demogorgons to aid the kids in Hawkins against Vecna. He is a dramatic, bearded and balding man who loves vodka and often drinks it to think. In season 5, he disguises himself as a truck driver named "Austin" and acts as a smuggler for the protagonists, sneaking supplies for them into Hawkins past the military checkpoints. In the climax, he goes into the Upside Down with the others and helps fight off the soldiers so the others can defeat Vecna.

=== Vecna ===
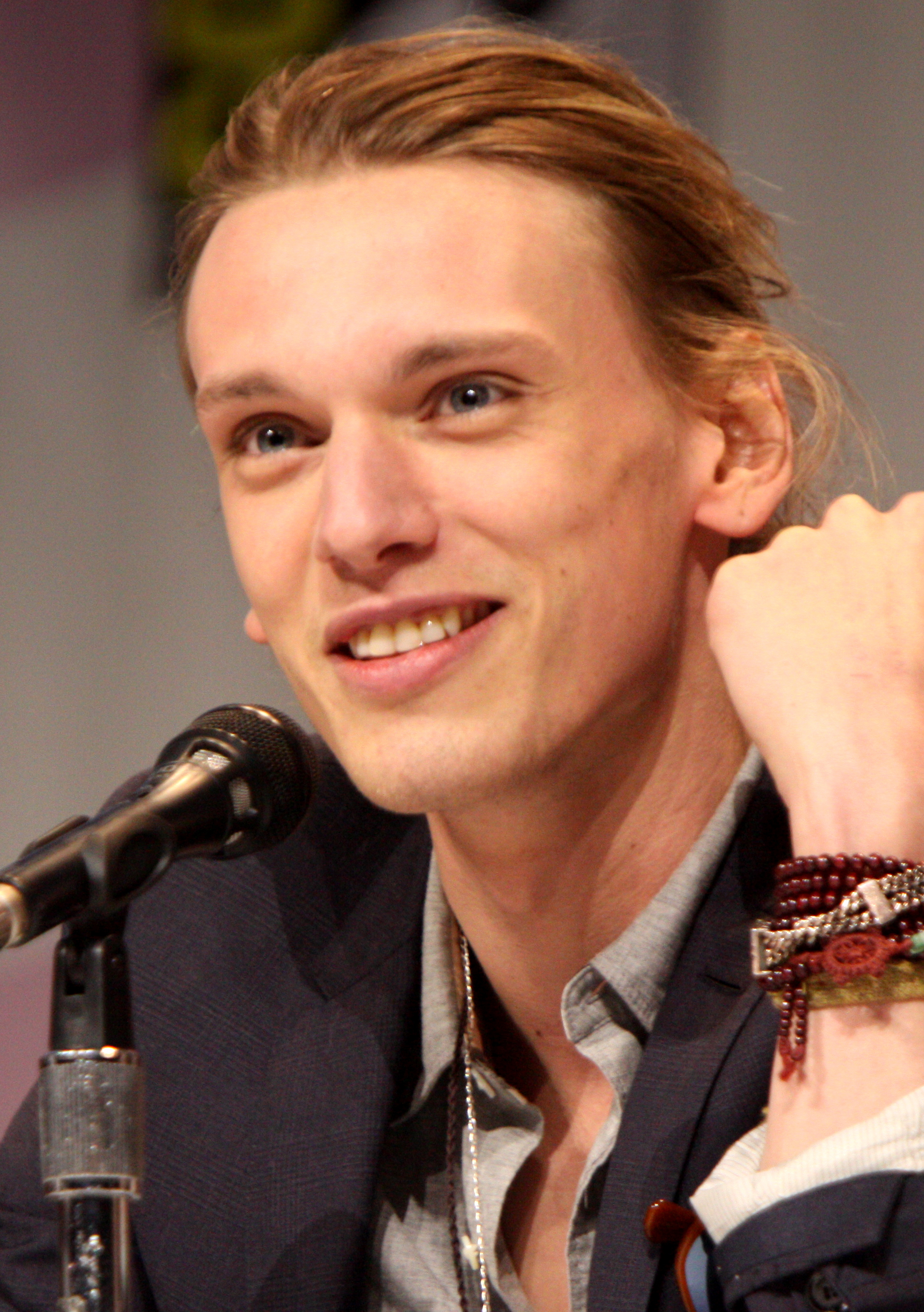
Jamie Campbell Bower in 2013

Portrayed by Jamie Campbell Bower as an adult, and Raphael Luce and Maksime Blatt as a child, Vecna is a murderous being in the Upside Down, who first appears in season four as a main character. He preys on individuals reeling from past traumas, and his method of killing involves inducing grandfather clocks and nightmarish visions before telekinetically breaking their bones and imploding their eyes into their skulls. He operates out of the Creel house in the Upside Down. He is revealed to have been responsible for the events that terrorized Hawkins in previous seasons, all the way back to Will's disappearance.

Vecna was born Henry Creel, who as a child stumbled upon a scientist in a cave possessing a mysterious briefcase. Despite the scientist's urges, Henry opened the case and found a stone that telepathically connected him to an alternate dimension known as the Abyss, where the Mind Flayer exerted influence over his psyche. Henry gradually fell further under the influence of the Mind Flayer, becoming hateful of humanity as a result; he particularly came to resent his family for their perceived hypocrisy, having learned that his father Victor mistakenly bombed the home of an innocent family during World War II. In the 1950s, he terrorized and murdered his mother and sister in his family's house using his powers, but the exertion put him in a coma while his father was arrested for the murders and placed in a psychiatric institution. Henry was placed in the care of Dr. Brenner, who made him the first test subject in Brenner's attempts to replicate Henry's powers in other children by transfusing them with his blood.

As an adult, Henry was made an orderly at Hawkins Lab to help oversee Brenner's experiments on a number of superpowered children, including Eleven. Brenner placed an implant (dubbed "Soteria") in Henry's neck that suppressed his powers. In 1979, Henry befriended Eleven amidst her being bullied by other subjects, and pointed out to her that she and the rest of the lab's occupants were prisoners. Sympathizing with Henry's plight after witnessing him being tortured by Brenner, Eleven destroyed the Soteria implant, restoring his powers. Henry massacred all the other children and most of the lab's staff and attempted to kill Eleven after she refused to help him eradicate the rest of humanity. Eleven overpowered Henry and sent him into the Abyss, where he became disfigured by lightning injuries and prolonged exposure to its toxic environment. Henry discovered various creatures residing in the realm, as well as the Mind Flayer, with which he had come to share a consciousness; he was thus able to control the creatures in the Abyss via their shared hive mind. Eleven's unwitting contact with one of the creatures during Brenner's experiments on her created a wormhole between Earth and the Abyss known as the Upside Down, allowing Henry to return to Hawkins to prey on its residents.

In 1986, after spending several years remaining dormant and growing stronger while controlling the Upside Down, Henry begins terrorizing Hawkins himself, murdering three Hawkins High School students: Chrissy Cunningham, Fred Benson, and Patrick McKinney. Dustin and Eddie dub him "Vecna" based on his similarities to the Dungeons & Dragons character of the same name. Vecna nearly kills Max until her friends find a way to break his influence using music. He later possesses Nancy, reveals to her his past, and then shows her a vision of the future where Hawkins is torn apart by rifts before releasing her. Nancy and her friends deduce that Vecna needs to open four gates to the Upside Down to enact his plan, three of which have been spawned at the site of each of his murders. Max attempts to bait Vecna while her friends travel to the Upside Down to kill him. Eleven enters Max's mind and confronts Vecna, who reveals himself as the mastermind behind the Upside Down's past attacks on Hawkins. Vecna possesses and kills Max before Eleven overpowers him, while Steve, Nancy, and Robin severely injure his physical form before he escapes. Though Eleven revives Max, her brief death opens a fourth gate to the Upside Down, causing rifts to tear through Hawkins.

In 1987, while Hawkins is under quarantine following the opening of the rifts, Vecna kidnaps 12 children, beginning with Holly Wheeler, and imprisons them in his lair in the Abyss, having lured them by pretending to be the character "Mr. Whatsit" from the novel A Wrinkle in Time. The children's minds are trapped inside a realm made of Henry's memories, where Max's mind is also trapped; she hides in the cave containing Henry's traumatic memory of first communing with the Abyss as a child, preventing him from reaching her inside his mind; Max eventually escapes with Holly's help and reawakens in her physical body. Vecna plans to use the children as vessels to erode the barrier between Earth and the Abyss, so that he can physically bring the two worlds together into one dominated by him. Mike, Will, Lucas, Dustin, Steve, Jonathan, Nancy, and Robin formulate a plan to allow the Abyss to descend close enough to Earth for them to climb into it from the Upside Down, and face off against the Mind Flayer in its final, giant kaiju form, controlled from inside its body by Vecna (which is also where he has imprisoned the children). Eleven arrives and overpowers Vecna with the help of Will, who finds himself capable of telepathically connecting with Vecna and being able to control both his creatures and Vecna himself. Joyce kills the injured Vecna by decapitating him with an axe.

=== Argyle ===
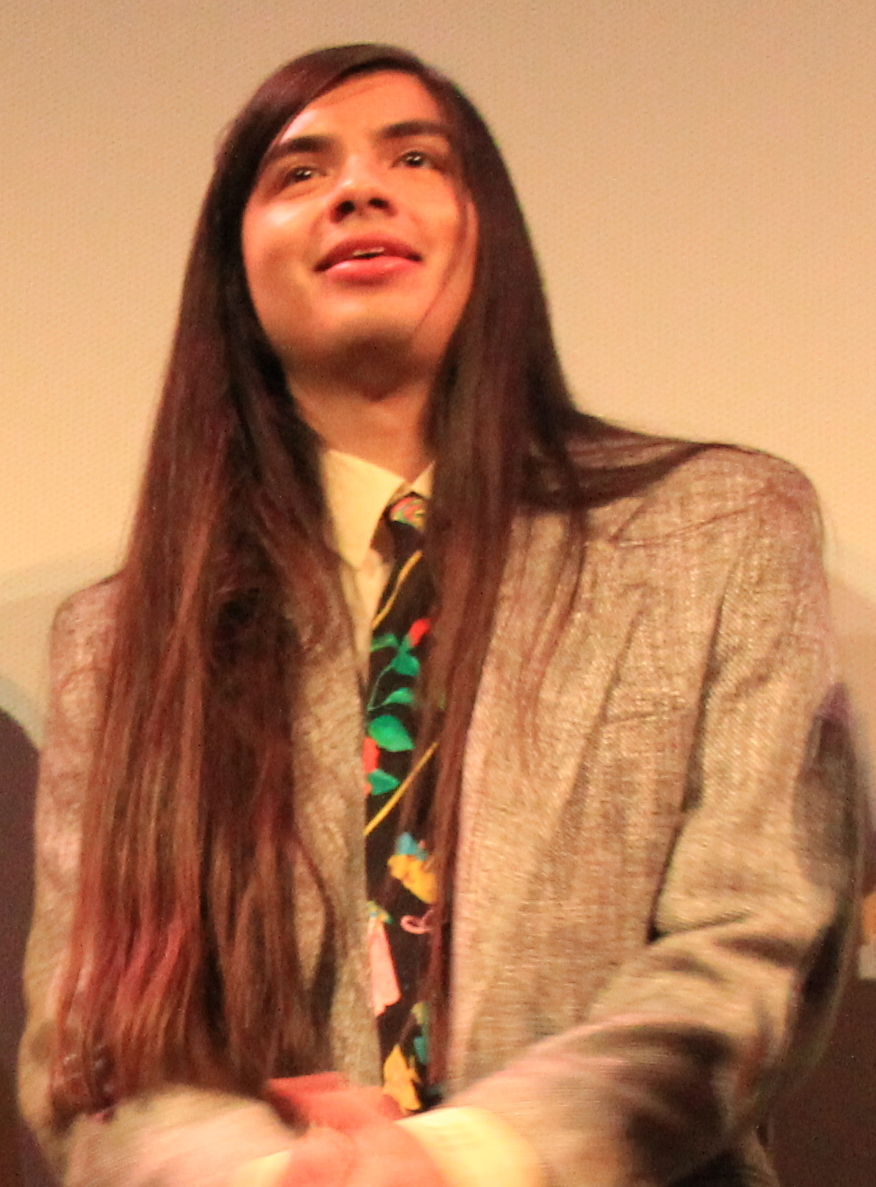
Eduardo Franco in 2019

Portrayed by Eduardo Franco, Argyle is a student at Lenora Hills High School, which Eleven, Will, and Jonathan attend in Lenora Hills, California.

Argyle becomes Jonathan's best friend, and he provides Jonathan with needed counsel, helping him relax with his stoner mentality. He works as a pizza delivery driver for Surfer Boy Pizza. When U.S. Army soldiers attack the Byers' home in search of Eleven, Argyle provides getaway transportation for Mike, Will, and Jonathan in his pizza delivery truck. He goes on to join the boys in their own attempt to find her. During their travels, they seek help from Dustin's long-distance girlfriend, Suzie, in Salt Lake City, and Argyle falls for the hacker's older sister, Eden. Argyle is pivotal in the Indiana Crew's efforts to aid the Hawkins Gang's plot to defeat Vecna, helping create a sensory deprivation tank for Eleven at a Surfer Boy Pizza location in Ohio. He then accompanies Eleven, Mike, Will, and Jonathan back to Hawkins, before returning to California.

=== Eddie Munson ===
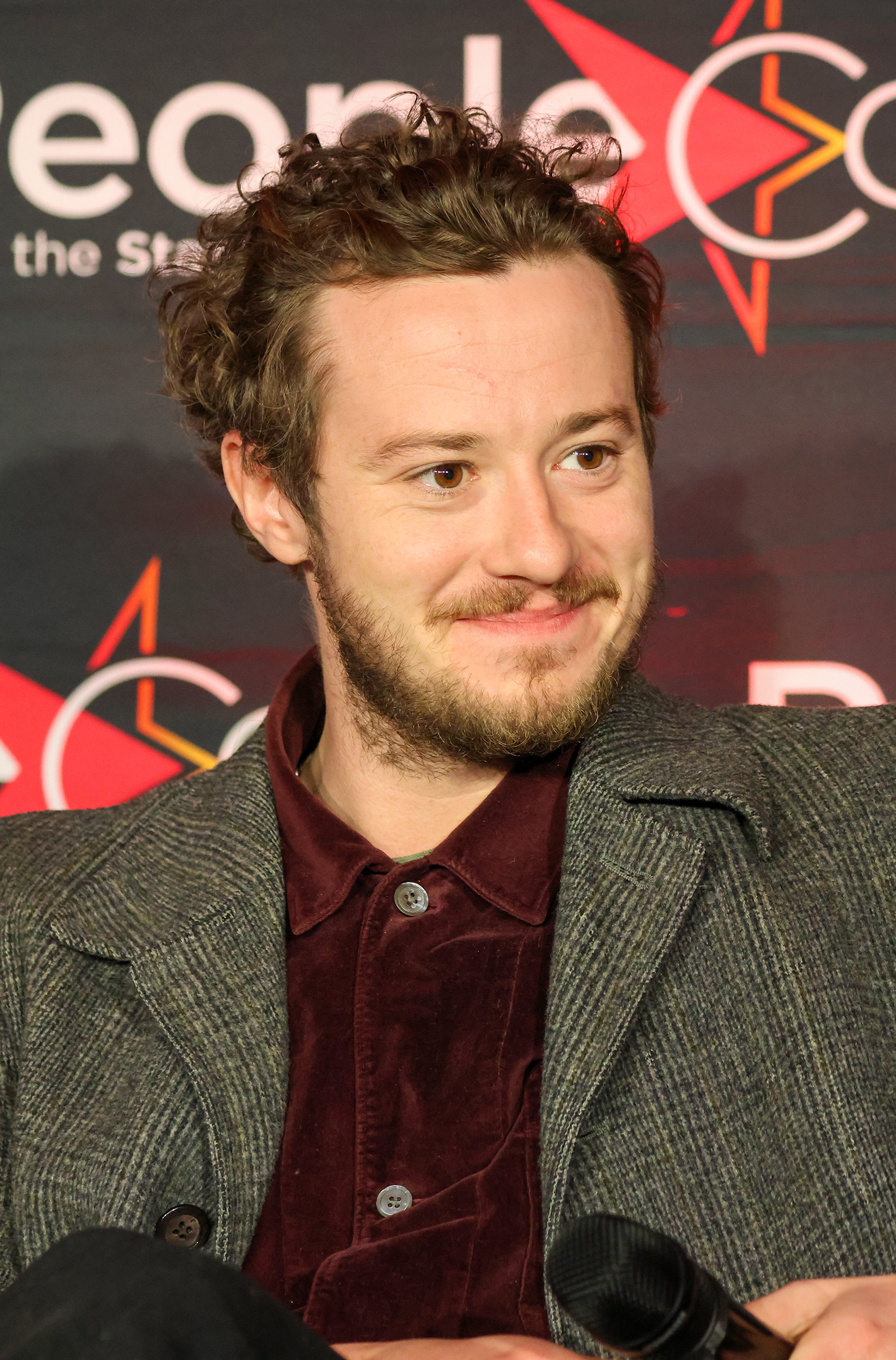
Joseph Quinn in 2022

Portrayed by Joseph Quinn, Eddie Munson is an eccentric Hawkins High School student and president of Hawkins High's Dungeons & Dragons-themed "Hellfire Club", where he befriends Mike and Dustin. He lives with his uncle, Wayne, and has parents who abandoned him. While the two are not seen onscreen together, it is made clear that their relationship is very close.

While selling drugs to Chrissy, Eddie watches as Vecna kills her with magic . He screams in horror and runs away. He realizes that the authorities will not believe his story and is later located by Dustin, Steve, Max, and Robin, who explain to him the existence of the Upside Down. The local police name Eddie as their chief suspect in Chrissy's murders. The school basketball team, led by Chrissy's boyfriend Jason Carver, attempts to hunt him down, with Jason believing Eddie to be the leader of a "Satanic cult". The group of friends realize they must work to clear Eddie's name. When they locate a new gate to the Upside Down in a lake, known as the Water Gate, he dives down after Steve is pulled in and experiences the Upside Down for the first time. In preparation for the final battle against Vecna, the group purchases and crafts weapons, with Eddie and Dustin re-entering the Upside Down to distract the demobats, small winged Demogorgons which resemble bats, protecting Vecna's lair. As part of the final plan, Eddie plays Metallica's "Master of Puppets" on his electric guitar. He later stays behind and sacrifices himself to further fend off the demobats. After Vecna's gates create large rifts that tear through Hawkins, the town still believes Eddie is responsible for the murders. Dustin meets Eddie's uncle and assures him that Eddie was a hero who died protecting the town that hates him. The book Flight of Icarus, written by Caitlin Schneiderhan, tells Eddie's origin story.

=== Holly Wheeler ===
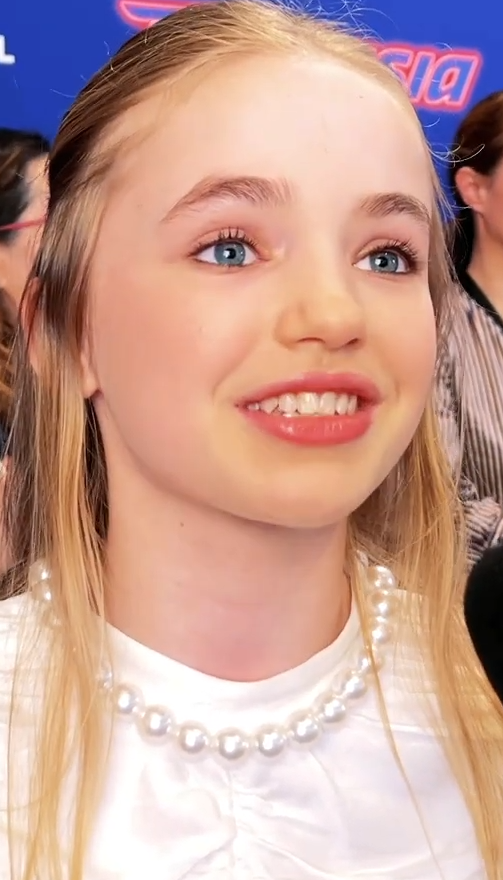
Nell Fisher in 2024

Portrayed by Anniston and Tinsley Price (co-star: seasons 1–4) and Nell Fisher (season 5), Holly Wheeler is the younger sister of Nancy and Mike and the youngest child of Karen and Ted. As a small child, she often sees glimpses of the supernatural events that happen in Hawkins.

While in elementary school, Holly is targeted by Vecna under the guise of an imaginary friend, "Mr. Whatsit" (based on the character from the novel A Wrinkle in Time), and is eventually abducted by a Demogorgon from her home. She lands into a realm of Vecna's memories, meeting and befriending Max, who informs her of Vecna's true agenda. The two escape together, but Holly is recaptured and taken back by Vecna. She later leads the other children on an escape from Vecna's mind, and even manages to attack him. She is physically reunited with her family after they free her from Vecna's lair in the Abyss. Holly attends the graduation ceremony of the younger teens and later plays Dungeons & Dragons with her friends in the Wheelers' basement.

=== Dr. Kay ===
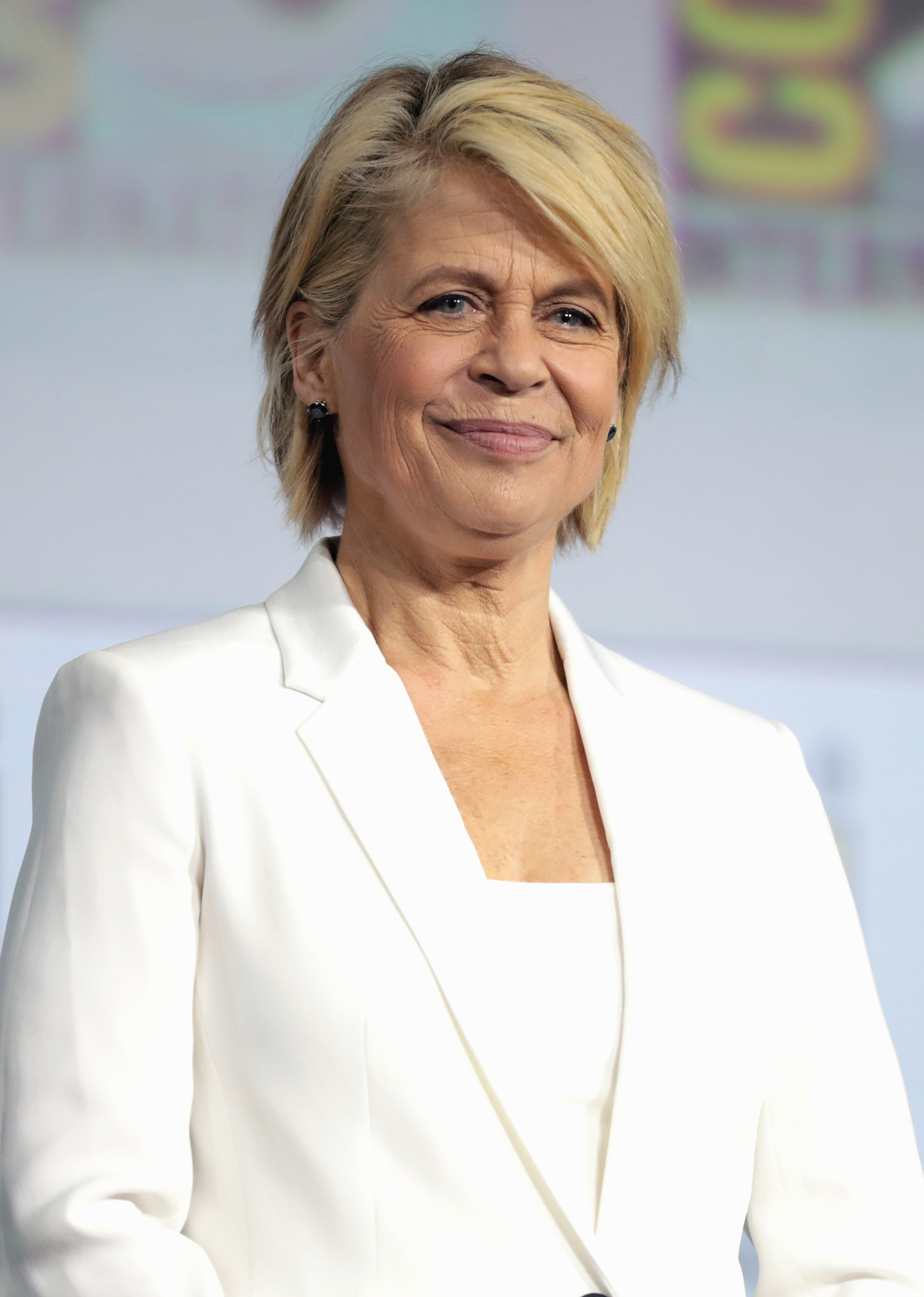
Linda Hamilton in 2019

Portrayed by Linda Hamilton, Dr. Kay is the new leader of the branch of the US military investigating the rifts between Hawkins and the upside down. She operates military bases both in Hawkins and the Upside Down. She has a goal of hunting and capturing Eleven, while performing science experiments of the creatures of the upside down. It is eventually revealed that she is holding Kali/Eight captive and is using her blood to inject it into pregnant mothers with the hope of restarting Brenner's program with their babies.

=== Derek Turnbow ===
Portrayed by Jake Connelly, Derek Turnbow, nicknamed "Dipshit Derek" and "Delightful Derek", is a bully in Holly Wheeler's class at school, and the younger brother of Erica's privileged friend Tina. He often taunts and annoys Holly and her friends on the school playground. He is targeted by Vecna after Holly as part of his plan to capture twelve children. To keep Vecna from capturing him, he is drugged and kidnapped by Erica, Robin, Joyce and Will, who try to warn him of the monsters coming. After he realizes they are telling the truth, he agrees to help them bring the other kids to safety, but he is captured and becomes trapped in Vecna's mind with Holly and their classmates. He initially refuses to help Holly after Vecna threatens to kill his family, but eventually escapes Vecna's mind alongside the rest of the children with Eleven, Kali and Max's help, before being physically saved by the rest of the rescue party in the Abyss. Derek attends the graduation ceremony of the younger teens and later plays Dungeons & Dragons with Holly and her friends in the Wheelers' basement.

== Creatures of the Abyss ==
=== Mind Flayer ===
The Mind Flayer is a malevolent semi-corporeal entity that resides in the parallel dimension known as the Abyss. Henry Creel / Vecna discovered the entity as a formless mass in the Abyss (after being sent there by Eleven) and morphed it into its spider-like appearance; while this act by Henry was initially explained by Henry's childhood fascination with black widow spiders, it is later revealed that the Mind Flayer first appeared to Henry in this spider-like form, when Henry first made contact with the stone, suggesting this was the Mind Flayer's original or preferred form and it planted the idea into Henry's mind. Through the Mind Flayer, every living thing in the Abyss serves as an extension of its mind and acts on its desire to spread that reality to Earth. According to Dustin, the Mind Flayer could be millions of years old.

The Mind Flayer's existence is revealed as it implanted a piece of itself into Will after his time in the Upside Down. The original gate spreads beneath Hawkins Lab, and the Mind Flayer directs adolescent demogorgons (or "demodogs") to guard a tunnel system branching beneath Hawkins. While Eleven manages to close the gate to sever the Mind Flayer's foothold, an ethereal fragment takes refuge at Brimborn Steel Works after being "exorcised" from Will. A year later, a new gate opened by invading Russians allows the Mind Flayer to awaken and possess rats and eventually humans, having most of its hosts ingest toxic chemicals and fertilizer, so their biomass can be used as raw materials for the Mind Flayer to create a proxy body in the shape of its full entity. The Mind Flayer nearly succeeds in killing Eleven, only to lose its foothold when Joyce and Hopper infiltrate the secret Russian laboratory and close the new gate.

Hopper, Joyce, and Murray discover another fragment of the Mind Flayer inside a Russian research facility in Kamchatka, where it eventually breaks free and animates the dormant demogorgons inside the facility. Hopper and Murray manage to kill the remaining creatures.

In a final confrontation, the group crosses into the Abyss to defeat the Mind Flayer and Henry. While in Henry's mind, Will discovered that the Mind Flayer had infected a younger Henry with a piece of itself, making Henry another one of its victims. However, Henry rejected turning against the creature, claiming that they were one rather than one controlling the other. In the Abyss, the Mind Flayer rose in the form of a giant spider-like creature that was slain by the group while Eleven and Will fatally wound Henry, taking advantage of the link between the two to weaken them. Henry is killed by Joyce, the children he had kidnapped rescued and the Upside Down destroyed, severing the connection between the Abyss and Hawkins. However, it remains unclear if the Mind Flayer has survived in its original non-corporeal state, as its particles are shown to still exist.

The Mind Flayer is the overarching antagonist of the series, being the source of Henry's corruption into Vecna and the master of the Upside Down.

=== Demogorgons, demodogs, and demobats ===
Demogorgons are predators from the Abyss with limited intelligence. They start off as slug-like creatures that can incubate in a victim's body, growing into a tadpole-like creature and gradually molting into an adolescent form called a "demodog" before fully maturing. An adult demogorgon appears in season one after a gateway to the Upside Down is accidentally opened in Hawkins, demonstrating an apparent ability to create small, temporary rifts between the Upside Down and the normal world as it hunted. Though that demogorgon is eventually destroyed, its abduction of Will allows the Mind Flayer to unleash a swarm of adolescent demogorgons upon Hawkins. They are all slain when their connection to the Mind Flayer is severed.

In season four, another adult demogorgon is held captive by the Russians at a prison camp in Kamchatka, where prisoners are sometimes executed by being fed to the creature. When Hopper is imprisoned there, he and his fellow prisoners are forced to fight the demogorgon. Hopper uses a flaming spear to hold back the creature while it ravages most of the other prisoners, while Joyce and Murray help him escape alongside Dmitri Antonov, a guard he bribed and befriended. The group discovers a number of demogorgons (as well as a fragment of the Mind Flayer) under study inside the prison. The creatures are accidentally let loose during a firefight between the prison guards and the adult demogorgon, but Hopper and Murray kill the remaining creatures and escape Russia.

A smaller variant with wings like a bat called the "demobat" also appears in season four, when Steve Harrington goes through the gate at the bottom of Lover's Lake which had opened up when Vecna killed Patrick McKinney. The demobats attack Steve, but he, Nancy, Robin and Eddie fend them off. Later, Eddie distracts the demobats and ends up being killed by them. After Vecna is repelled, they fall to the ground and seemingly die.

== Recurring characters ==
The following is a list of guest characters that have recurring roles throughout the series. The characters are listed by the order in which they first appeared.

=== Introduced in season one ===
- Joe Chrest as Ted Wheeler, husband of Karen and father of Nancy, Mike, and Holly. Although the primary breadwinner for the family, he is often out of sync with his children and the emotional and physical needs of his wife. He is frequently found asleep in a recliner chair, making him a target of amusement for many characters.
- Randy Havens as Scott Clarke, the boys' teacher. He encourages their interest in science and technology and helps them whenever asked. In season five, Erica recruits him to replace Dustin after got stuck in the Upside Down, where he learns of the existence of the Upside Down and helps the group plan their battle against Vecna.
- Rob Morgan as Calvin Powell, one of Hopper's officers. He later becomes the Hawkins chief of police following Hopper's disappearance.
- John Reynolds as Phil Callahan, another of Hopper's officers. Not nearly as serious as his partner, he still works hard in the search for Will.
- Susan Shalhoub Larkin as Florence ("Flo"), the secretary at the Hawkins Police Station. She shows concern about Hopper's health.
- Shannon Purser as Barbara "Barb" Holland, an introvert and best friend of Nancy. She is concerned that her friendship with Nancy may be threatened by Nancy's relationship with Steve. Barb is one of the first victims of the Demogorgon.
- Ross Partridge as Lonnie Byers, the ex-husband of Joyce and biological father of Jonathan and Will. He has a much younger girlfriend named Cynthia.
- Catherine Dyer as Connie Frazier, Brenner's DOE enforcer who unquestioningly obeys orders, even if it means killing those who have come into contact with Eleven. She is eventually killed by Eleven at the end of Season 1.
- Tobias Jelinek as the lead agent at Hawkins National Laboratory, who assists Brenner.
- Peyton Wich as Troy Walsh, a boy who antagonizes Mike, Lucas, and Dustin. After being publicly humiliated by Eleven and an attempted retaliation on Mike, Troy is not seen again after season one. The tie-in comic The Bully reveals that he and his family has since moved out, and that his bad behavior was due to his father encouraging him to be mean and remorseless. Troy appears to change for the better and feels remorseful for his actions, upon learning that his father was fired from his job for his poor attitude and refusal to apologize.
- Cade Jones as James Dante, a boy who hangs around with Troy. The Bully reveals that James has grown tired of Troy's behavior; before Troy and his family moved away, Troy apologized to James and bid him farewell, with James staying in Hawkins.
- Chester Rushing as Tommy Hagan, a former best friend of Steve and boyfriend of Carol. Tommy is a bully who revels in his popularity. He returns in season two as a lackey for Billy. Although he does not appear in season three, he is briefly mentioned by Steve.
- Chelsea Talmadge as Carol Perkins, a former best friend of Steve and girlfriend of Tommy. Like her boyfriend, Carol will do anything to ensure her popularity. She returns in season two with two new friends, Tina and Vicki.
- Aimee Mullins as Terry Ives, the biological mother of Jane (Eleven), who was stolen from her shortly after she gave birth. She resides with her sister Becky and has since gone into a mental state where she is unaware of her surroundings, as the men who abducted her daughter had given her electroshock therapy to try and cover up her existence.

=== Introduced in season two ===
- Linnea Berthelsen as Kali Prasad / 008, a young woman with illusion manipulation abilities, who, along with Eleven / Jane, was experimented on at the Hawkins Laboratory, but later managed to escape. She has a caring side though often covered by her vindictive personality. In season two, Eleven reunites with Kali, who has established a revenge-seeking gang in Chicago consisting of Axel, Dottie, Funshine, and Mick. While reconnecting, Kali teaches Eleven how to channel some of her powers through anger. In season five, Kali is caught by Dr. Kay's group for experimentation, with all of her gang having been killed and her hair butchered. Kali is saved by Eleven and Hopper. During a confrontation with a military squadron in the Upside Down, Kali is fatally wounded as Eleven tries to prevent her death. After seeing the speakers that were at his graduation, Mike theorizes to his friends that Kali used the last of her powers to help Eleven escape from Dr. Kay and the military undetected, by projecting an illusion showing Eleven's demise in the Upside Down's destruction.
  - Vanathi Kalai Parthiban portrays a younger Kali in seasons two and four.
- Catherine Curtin as Claudia Henderson, Dustin's sweet and caring yet often clueless mother. She is notably a single mother.
- Jennifer Marshall as Susan Hargrove (néé Mayfield), Max's mother, Billy's stepmother, and Neil's wife. Whereas her husband is abusive and selfish, she continues to be kind to Billy.
- Karen Ceesay as Sue Sinclair, Lucas and Erica's mother.

=== Introduced in season three ===
- Jake Busey as Bruce Lowe, a journalist for the Hawkins Post who routinely harasses and mocks Nancy because of her sex. He becomes possessed by the Mind Flayer. Bruce is beaten to death in self-defense by Nancy with a fire extinguisher after he attacks her, and his corpse merges with Tom's to become a gruesome arthropod-like monster.
- Andrey Ivchenko as Grigori, a Russian hitman and enforcer for the scientists working under Hawkins. He is killed by Hopper at the end of season 3.
- Francesca Reale as Heather Holloway, a popular lifeguard at the Hawkins Community Pool who becomes possessed by the Mind Flayer
- Michael Park as Tom Holloway, the editor of the Hawkins Post and Heather's father. He becomes possessed by the Mind Flayer. He is killed in self-defense by Jonathan, and his corpse merges with Bruce's to become a gruesome arthropod-like monster.
- Alec Utgoff as Dr. Alexei, a Russian scientist who was working with the regiment to open a portal to the Upside Down. He is later abducted by Hopper and Joyce for information on his fellow Russians. Whilst with them, he develops an affinity for fast food and cartoons. He was developing a friendship with Murray before Grigori assassinated him at the fairgrounds.
- Cary Elwes as Mayor Larry Kline, a corrupt politician being blackmailed into working for the Russians.
- Peggy Miley as Doris Driscoll, an elderly resident of Hawkins who is visited by Jonathan and Nancy while investigating a story. She becomes possessed by the Mind Flayer.

=== Introduced in season four ===
- Mason Dye as Jason Carver, the captain of the Hawkins High School basketball team and Chrissy's boyfriend. After Chrissy's death, he leads his team on a witch-hunt for Eddie, whom he believes to be the perpetrator and the leader of a Satanic cult. He confronts Lucas at the Creel House and Lucas beats him in a fight. Jason is killed when Vecna opens the fourth gate which cuts his body in half.
- Amybeth McNulty as Vickie Dunne, a student on the Hawkins High School marching band, and later a candy striper at the local hospital and Robin's love interest.
- Tristan Spohn as Two / 002, a lab subject at Hawkins Lab who bullies Eleven. In the Hawkins Lab massacre he was Henry's last victim.
- Christian Ganiere as Ten / 010, One of the subjects at Hawkins Lab, often asked to open the door to the rainbow room, and was the first victim discovered by Brenner after the Hawkins Lab Massacre.
- Myles Truitt as Patrick McKinney, a player on the basketball team. He is Vecna's third victim.
- Clayton Royal Johnson as Andy, a player on the basketball team.
- Tom Wlaschiha as Dmitri Antonov / "Enzo", a prison guard in Kamchatka that Hopper bribes to help secure his freedom. He is also imprisoned for treason with Hopper, but he and Hopper work together to escape with the help of Joyce and Murray.
- Vaidotas Martinaitis as Melnikov, the prison warden at Kamchatka.
- Nikola Đuričko as Yuri Ismaylov, a pilot and smuggler of American goods to Russia and Antonov's contact whom he instructs Joyce and Murray to meet with in Alaska. He betrays Antonov to the Russians and decides to hand Joyce and Murray over as prisoners in hopes of higher profits. However, Joyce and Murray hold him captive and use him to break into the prison to rescue Hopper. Antonov convinces Yuri to help them escape Russia.
- Sherman Augustus as Lt. Colonel Jack Sullivan, a U.S. Army official leading a manhunt for Eleven, believing her to be responsible for the latest string of murders in Hawkins.
- Joel Stoffer as Wayne Munson, Eddie's uncle. Despite the town's beliefs about Eddie, Wayne cares deeply for his nephew and knows that he is innocent. In the aftermath of the opening of the fourth gate Wayne is comforted by Dustin who tells him that Eddie sacrificed himself to save Hawkins and that he was a hero.
- Paris Benjamin as Agent Stinson, an agent working for Sam Owens. She is the contact for Hopper to help him, Joyce and Murray return to the States.
- Pasha D. Lychnikoff as Oleg, an inmate at Kamchatka imprisoned alongside Hopper.
- Nikolai Nikolaeff as Ivan, a guard at Kamchatka.

=== Introduced in season five ===
- Alex Breaux as Lt. Robert Akers, a U.S. Army official working under Sullivan.
- Hope Hynes Love as Miss Harris, Holly's elementary school teacher.
- Caroline Elle Abrams as Tina Turnbow, a former friend of Erica's.
- Eden Stephens as Debbie Miller, one Holly's best friends.

=== Introduced in Tales from '85 ===
- Odessa A'zion as Nikki Baxter, a new kid in Hawkins who likes to invent gadgets.
- Janeane Garofalo as Anna Baxter, Nikki's mother and substitute science teacher for Mr. Clarke.
- Lou Diamond Phillips as Daniel Fischer, Anna's boyfriend and former Hawkins Lab scientist who is responsible for all of the strange happenings in town.

== Guest characters ==
The following is a supplementary list of guest stars that appear in lesser roles, make significant cameo appearances or who receive co-starring credit over multiple appearances. The characters are listed in the order in which they first appeared.

=== Introduced in season one ===
- Chris Sullivan as Benny Hammond, owner and chef of Benny's Burgers, and friend of Hopper. He takes care of Eleven shortly after her escape but is killed by Hawkins Lab personnel shortly afterwards.
- Tony Vaughn as Russell Coleman, the principal at Hawkins Middle School.
- Charles Lawlor as Donald Melvald, the owner of Melvald's General Store where Joyce works.
- Hugh Holub as the lead scientist at Hawkins Laboratory.
- Andrew Benator as a scientist at Hawkins Laboratory.
- Pete Burris as the head of security at Hawkins Laboratory.
- Robert Walker-Branchaud as an agent of Hawkins Laboratory who disguises himself as a repairman.
- Glennellen Anderson as Nicole, a classmate of Nancy, Steve and Jonathan.
- Cynthia Barrett as Marsha Holland, Barbara's mother.
- Jerri Tubbs as Diane Hopper, Jim's ex-wife.
- Elle Graham as Sara Hopper, Jim and Diane's daughter, who died of cancer.
- Shawn Levy, the show's executive producer, makes a cameo appearance as a morgue worker.
- Amy Seimetz as Becky Ives, Terry's sister who takes care of her.

=== Introduced in season two ===
- Kai L. Green as Funshine, a member of Kali's crew. Kali considers him to be a teddy bear, despite his size and strength. He is the oldest of the crew. In season five, Funshine is killed by Dr. Kay's soldiers when they come for Kali.
- James Landry Hébert as Axel, an aggressive member of Kali's crew in a bleach blonde and pink mohawk who has arachnophobia. In season five, Axel is killed by Dr. Kay's soldiers when they come for Kali.
- Anna Jacoby-Heron as Dottie, the sarcastic newest member of Kali's crew who previously escaped from a psychiatric hospital. In season five, Dottie is killed by Dr. Kay's soldiers when they come for Kali.
- Gabrielle Maiden as Mick, a member of Kali's crew. She is the least aggressive of the crew and is their driver. In season five, Mick is killed by Dr. Kay's soldiers when they come for Kali.
- Matty Cardarople as Keith, an employee at the Palace Arcade in 1984 and at Family Video nearly a year later.
- Madelyn Cline as Tina and Abigail Cowen as Vicki, students in Hawkins High School and friends of Carol.
- Arnell Powell as Charles Sinclair, Lucas and Erica's father.
- Aaron Muñoz as Mr. Holland, Barbara's father.
- Joe Davison as a technician at Hawkins Laboratory.
- Pruitt Taylor Vince as Ray, a technician at Hawkins Laboratory who electrocuted Terry Ives, contributing to her deteriorated mental state.
- Will Chase as Neil Hargrove, Billy's father, Max's stepfather, and Susan's husband. He is very abusive to his son, both verbally and physically.
- Sydney Bullock as Stacey Albright, a snobby but popular girl at Hawkins High School who rejects Dustin's request for a dance during the Snow Ball. In season five, she is a lot nicer to the Party and kindly invites them over to her place for a graduation party with the popular kids, though the Party politely declined.

=== Introduced in season three ===
- John Vodka as General Stepanov, a KGB General.
- Yasen Peyankov as a Russian Scientist who works along with Alexei.
- Georgui Kasaev as a Russian comm officer.
- Caroline Arapoglou as Winnie Kline, Mayor Kline's wife.
- Allyssa Brooke as Candice, Mayor Kline's secretary.
- Holly Morris as Janet Holloway, wife of Tom and mother of Heather.
- Chantell D. Christopher as a receptionist at Hawkins Memorial Hospital.
- Misha Kuznetsov as Colonel Ozerov, an authoritative and brutal Soviet military officer.
- Arthur Darbinyan as Zharkov, a Russian scientist working for Commander Ozerov, who specializes in torturing hostages.
- Beth Riesgraf as Billy's mother.
- Gabriella Pizzolo as Suzie Bingham; Dustin's girlfriend, whom he met at summer camp. Suzie lives with her large Mormon family at a house in Salt Lake City.

=== Introduced in season four ===
- Grace Van Dien as Chrissy Cunningham, a Hawkins High School cheerleader who is killed by Vecna.
- Regina Ting Chen as Ms. Kelly, the counselor at Hawkins High School.
- Logan Riley Bruner as Fred Benson, Nancy's colleague at the Hawkins High School newspaper. He is haunted by his role in a fatal car accident. He is eventually killed by Vecna.
- Elodie Grace Orkin as Angela, a popular student at Lenora High School in California who briefly bullies Eleven. She is eventually taken to the hospital after Eleven strikes her in the face with a roller skate, giving Angela a Grade 2 concussion.
- Logan Allen as Jake, Angela's boyfriend and a popular student at Lenora High School. He and his two best friends, Stacy (played by Gabriella Surodjawan) and Chad (played by Alex Wagenman) join Angela in bullying Eleven, only to become shocked when Eleven retaliates by hitting Angela's face with a roller skate.
- Robert Englund as Victor Creel, a man arrested for supposedly murdering his wife and daughter in the 1950s. He has since spent his life at a psychiatric institution. Victor maintains that his family was killed by a demon, and is left permanently disfigured after attempting to kill himself in prison by cutting out his eyes.
  - Kevin L. Johnson as young Victor Creel
- Tyner Rushing as Virginia Creel, Victor's wife, and Livi Burch as Alice Creel, their daughter, both killed by Henry in the 1950s.
- Ira Amyx as Agent Harmon, and Kendrick Cross as Agent Wallace, bodyguards working for Sam Owens. They are assigned to protect Jonathan, Will, and Mike from the military. In the attack on the Byers' home, Harmon is killed, but Wallace is wounded and taken prisoner by Sullivan in order to find Eleven's whereabouts.
- Audrey Holcomb as Eden Bingham, Suzie's goth eldest sister who babysits her and the rest of their siblings. Argyle becomes infatuated with her upon first meeting her, and the two of them are later caught smoking marijuana together in Argyle's pizza van by Suzie, Mike, Will, and Jonathan.
- Ed Amatrudo as Director Hatch, the director of the psychiatric institution where Victor was put after his arrest.
- Members of Eddie's band, Corroded Coffin:
  - Gwydion Lashlee-Walton as Gareth, who plays the drums.
  - Trey Best as Jeff, who plays an electric guitar.
  - Grant Goodman as Freak 1, who plays an electric bass.
