= Chapter Five: Shock Jock =

- Stranger Things episode
- Promotional poster by Butcher Billy
- Episode no.: Season 5 Episode 5
- Directed by: Frank Darabont
- Written by: Curtis Gwinn
- Cinematography by: Brett Jutkiewicz
- Editing by: Katheryn Naranjo; Dean Zimmerman
- Original air date: December 25, 2025
- Running time: 68 minutes

Guest appearances
- Linnea Berthelsen as Kali / Eight; Alex Breaux as Robert Akers; Jake Connelly as Derek Turnbow; Nell Fisher as Holly Wheeler; Hope Hynes Love as Miss Harris

Episode chronology
← Previous "Chapter Four: Sorcerer"	Next → "Chapter Six: Escape from Camazotz"
- Stranger Things season 5

"Chapter Five: Shock Jock" is the fifth episode of the fifth season of the American science fiction horror drama television series Stranger Things. The 39th episode overall, it was written by Curtis Gwinn and directed by Frank Darabont. It was released on December 25, 2025, on Netflix alongside the subsequent two episodes as the premiere episode of season five's volume two.

In the episode, the group hatch a plan to forcibly reconnect Will to the Demogorgon hive mind, while tensions begin to flare between Nancy, Jonathan, Steve, and Dustin, as they explore Hawkins Laboratory in the Upside Down. Eleven is also confronted with a disturbing revelation when she reconnects with her long-lost sister. The episode received generally positive reviews from critics, praising the visual effects and performances from Noah Schnapp and Jamie Campbell Bower.

== Plot ==
Immediately after killing the Demogorgons at the military base, Will flees with a stunned Joyce and Mike before reinforcements arrive. As Lt. Akers has the military sweep the area, Dr. Kay discovers that Kali’s presence is an illusion, stemming from the girl’s powers. The illusion fades since Kali is revealed to be too far from the base, driving with El and Hopper in a military car. Will reveals that all of the children have been taken by Vecna and blames himself for failing to intervene sooner. Reuniting with Lucas, Robin, and Murray, Joyce proposes using Will’s lingering connection to the hivemind to locate Vecna. The group pursues two parallel plans: Erica suggests recruiting Dustin's science teacher, Scott Clarke, to construct a tracking device, while Lucas (remembering what happened with Billy Hargrove in the sauna (Note: As depicted in the third season episode "Chapter Four: The Sauna Test" (2019))) proposes using the radio tower’s electricity to briefly revive a Demogorgon so Will can reconnect to the hive. During preparations, Will confides in Robin, who shares her own experience of coming out to Steve. (Note: As depicted in the third season episode "Chapter Seven: The Bite" (2019))

In Vecna’s mindscape, appearing in his human form as Henry Creel, Vecna welcomes the kidnapped children into his home, claiming he saved them from monsters. He tells them that together they can harness a force powerful enough to drive the darkness away. Holly Wheeler secretly meets with Max Mayfield and warns her of Henry’s plan, urging that they escape before it is too late. Derek Turnbow reveals that he followed them and helps devise a distraction to draw Henry’s attention. Derek convinces the children to venture into the woods, allowing Max and Holly to search Holly’s memories for Henry’s first appearance. They trace it to the attack on the Wheeler house when Holly was taken and nearly find a way out before Henry confronts them, revealing his true form. In the woods, Henry corners Derek and threatens his family to ensure his compliance. Meanwhile, the group successfully reanimates a Demogorgon, enabling Will to reconnect to the hive mind and enter Vecna’s mind. Will witnesses Vecna strangling Max and manages to injure him, allowing Max and Holly to escape. Will briefly overpowers Vecna and speaks through him, urging Max to run, before Vecna violently ejects Will from the mindscape, leaving him unconscious in the real world.

In the Upside Down, Hopper, Eleven, and Kali arrive at the church to find Steve, Dustin, Nancy, and Jonathan missing. As Hopper attempts to reestablish contact, Kali explains to Eleven that after they parted ways, (Note: As depicted in the second season episode "Chapter Seven: The Lost Sister" (2017)) she was found by the military, who killed her friends and brought her to Dr. Kay. She conducted experiments on her at the military facility, including infusing pregnant women with her blood to replicate the conditions that allowed Martin Brenner to produce Henry and Eleven's abilities. At Hawkins Laboratory in the Upside Down, Dustin theorizes that the mysterious wall is protecting the area where Vecna has taken the children and that destroying its power source may allow their rescue. The group splits up to search the facility. Steve and Dustin argue, with Steve speaking dismissively of Eddie’s sacrifice, leading to a physical confrontation before Steve storms off. Elsewhere, Nancy and Jonathan encounter rooms melting together with soldiers fused into the walls and ascend to the roof, where they discover a massive floating energy sphere. After finding a hidden room, Dustin uncovers Dr. Brenner’s research notes and realizes the wall is not a protective shield. He rushes to warn the others that destroying it would be fatal, but Nancy fires at the sphere before he can reach her.

== Production ==
On December 11, 2025, Ross Duffer posted to Instagram, confirming that "Chapter Five: Shock Jock", along with volume two's other episodes, "Chapter Six: Escape from Camazotz" and "Chapter Seven: The Bridge", were complete. Regarding the episode, he teased, "Shock Jock” picks up moments after the end of “Chapter Four: Sorcerer". Frank Darabont is back, but he flexes very different muscles on this one than he did on "Turnbow Trap"— it’s far darker, and far scarier."

=== Writing ===
The episode was written by Curtis Gwinn, marking his third writing credit on the show. Save for Eleven's dilemma over if happy endings are possible and both Vecna's backstory and his connection to the Mind Flayer, whom they deemed would be most impactful and revelatory in the series finale "Chapter Eight: The Rightside Up", The Duffer Brothers felt it was important for all of their characters to head into the final battle by really resolving all of their internal and external conflicts either within themselves or with others as they had to be at the best of their ability and on the same page if there are going to be able to defeat the great evil, so they dedicated all of the fifth season's second volume episodes to resolve all of those plots.

Of the return of her character Kali/Eight, Linnea Berthelsen stated that she felt that Kali Prasad was "very much a person who want to be in control" when viewers last saw her in season two and that she "loses everything" in the intervening time between appearances. Berthelsen asked the Duffer Brothers if she could have her head shaved on camera, and this was completed by the co-head of the series' hair department. Millie Bobby Brown noted that it is "incredibly shocking" to Eleven that Eight is still alive and that she feels the reveal helps to "unveil what Dr. Kay has been doing" in the Upside Down.

Noah Schnapp, who plays Will Byers, explained that Will has a new inner strength following the end of "Chapter Four: Sorcerer" that causes him to try and convince his mother Joyce Byers to stop being so overprotective of him. Winona Ryder, who portrays Joyce, stated that both she was "taken aback" by Schnapp's performance and that Will's new confidence influences Joyce to propose the plan of reconnecting him to the hive mind, something Schnapp felt she would not have done previously. Ryder echoed Schnapp's thoughts, explaining that "I remember the scene where I encourage him to go find Vecna, and I trust him. When I read it, my instinct was, there’s no way I would encourage him to do something so dangerous. But then something clicked, and Joyce realizes he’s strong enough and smart enough to do this" and claimed the scene was "incredibly meaningful and significant for their relationship".

Discussing Dustin Henderson's character arc, which comes to a head in this episode through a physical fight with Steve Harrington, Dustin's actor Gaten Matarazzo stated that he knew the dynamic between the two would be polarizing to viewers and that he "hoped there would be a bit of a conflicted feeling around it" noting that, "no matter how much one is grieving, it doesn't excuse your behavior towards other people, especially those who are in your corner". He contrasted Dustin's grieving over Eddie with Lucas' grieving over Max, pointing out that both characters are "dealing with something similar" but that Lucas is "taking it in a route that is less selfish" and how the season is highlighting that there is no one way to process loss. Matarazzo also stated that Dustin's more contentious relationship with Steve altered the way he worked with Joe Keery.

=== Filming ===
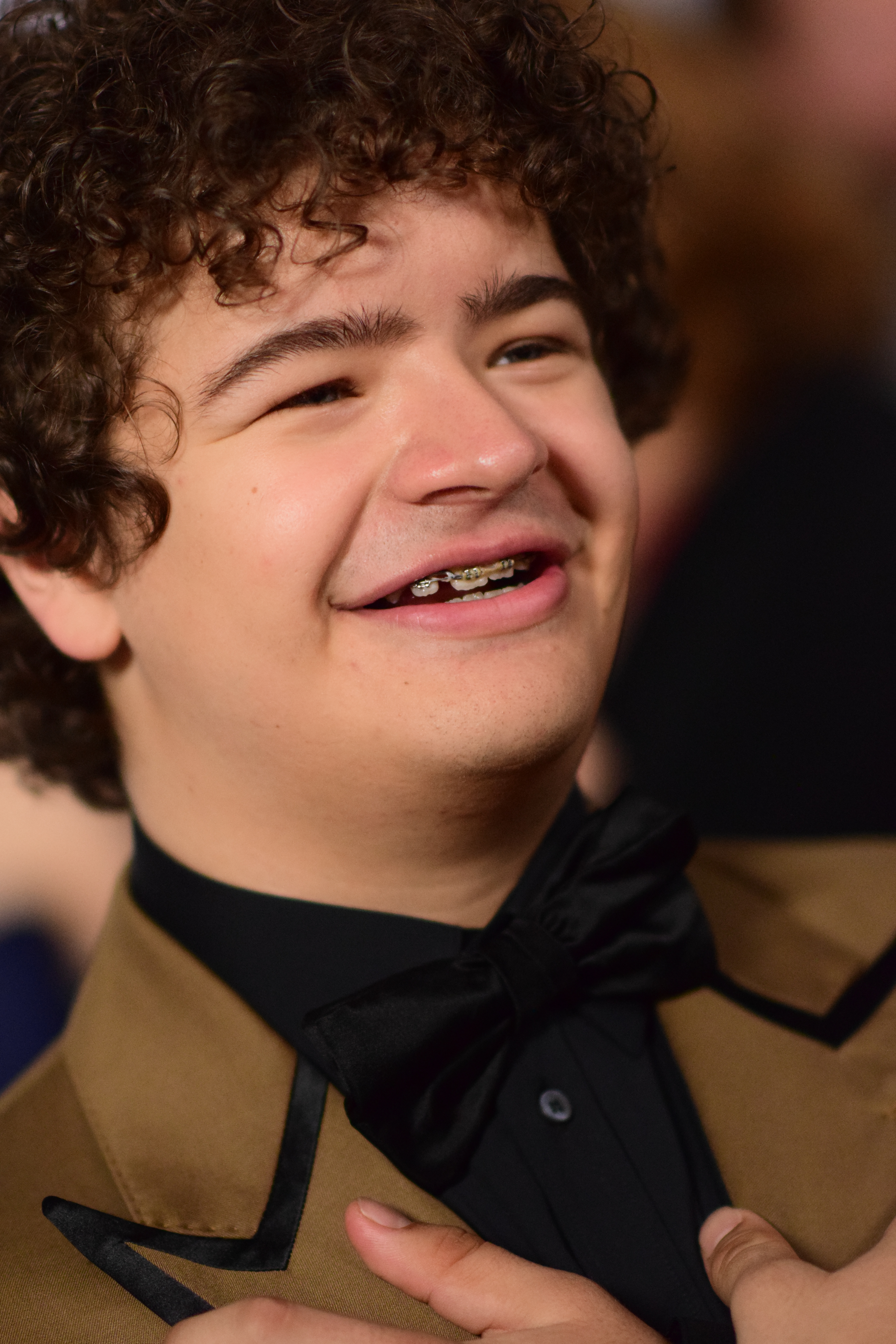
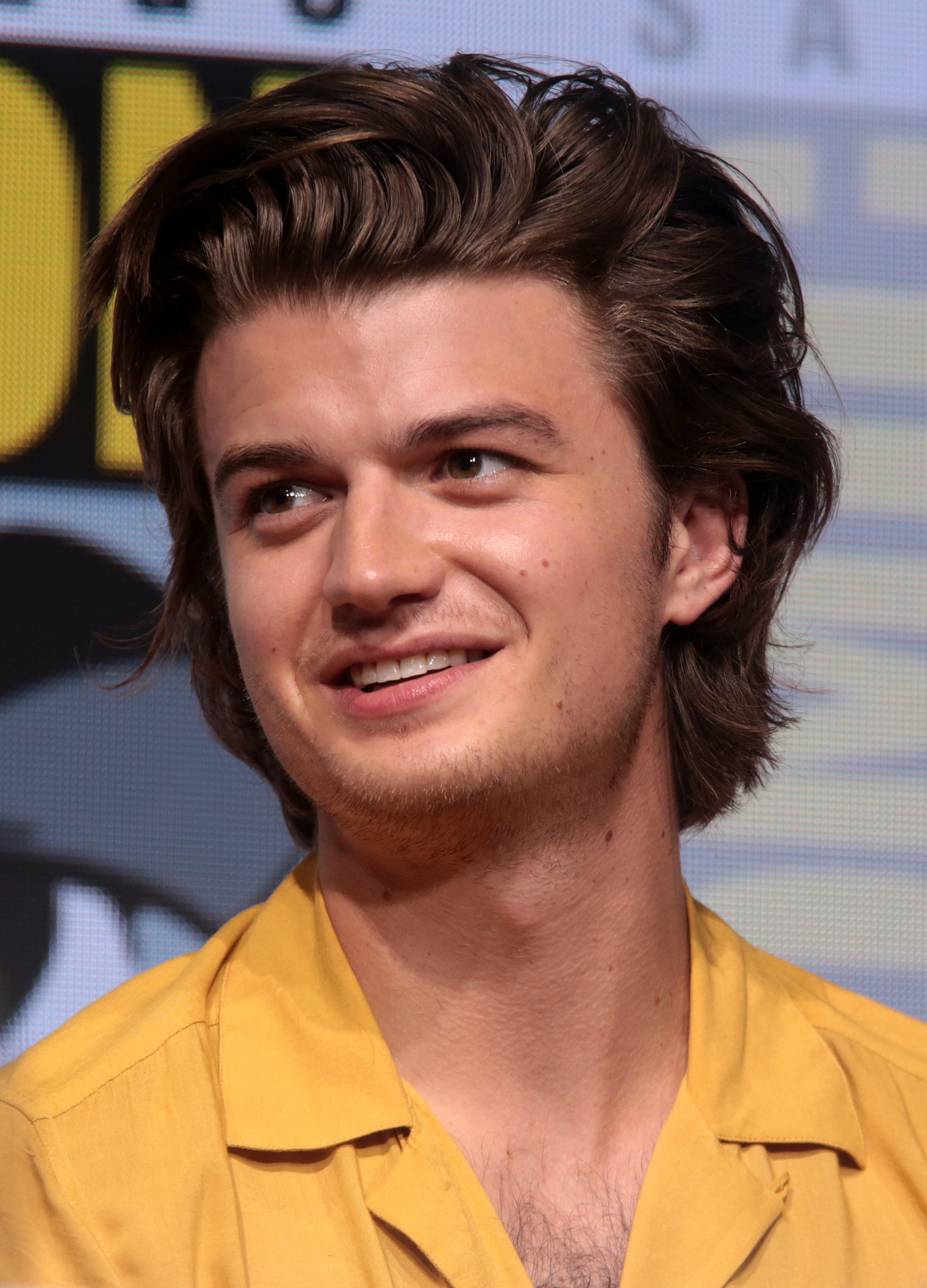
Dustin Henderson and Steve Harrington, portrayed by Gaten Matarazzo and Joe Keery, come to blows in the episode, a contrast from their fan-favorite friendship in previous seasons.

The episode was directed by Frank Darabont, his second directing credit on the show. Darabont came out of retirement to work on the show, having last directed twelve years prior on the series Mob City (2013). He had met with the Duffer Brothers for lunch before production on the fifth season began and the trio expressed mutual appreciation for each others' work, leading the Duffers to call him and invite him to direct. Darabont was originally only scheduled to direct this episode, but agreed to also direct "Chapter Three: The Turnbow Trap" after Dan Trachtenberg had to drop out due to conflicts with Predator: Badlands (2025). Darabont stated that, though he has had several offers to direct since his retirement, he felt he compelled to agree to work on Stranger Things because he and his wife Sara Rae were such big fans of the show, having watched the first four seasons together multiple times.

Of filming the scene where Will taps into Vecna's mind, Darabont explained that he found the process "complex" due to the number of things happening in the script in different locations simultaneously, advising that he ultimately ended up ripping out all of Will's scenes and highlighting them for Schnapp so that he was aware of what he would need to be doing in order. Darabont called Schnapp "astonishing" during these scenes, adding "I was so proud of him because he’s actually a very sweet, very quiet, very shy person. But boy, when the cameras are rolling, he lets it fly. He’s a fearless actor — as many of them are, of course — I was so impressed with what he did". Similarly, he stated that the fight between Dustin and Steve involved "a lot of careful preplanning" due to the limited lighting in the scene. Darabont remarked that he found the build up to the fight "marvelous" and praised Matarazzo and Keery's abilities to play both the emotional and physical elements of the scenes, adding that both actors did the majority of the stunts themselves during filming.

Discussing the filming of Dustin and Steve's fight, Matarazzo explained that he put a lot of pressure on himself, expressing that "I remember I felt very normal until about 20 minutes before we started shooting" and that he tried to work on getting himself into a neutral headspace so that he could be open to "discovering what happens". He explained that there were "a lot of different takes" where the characters were playing different emotions, and that the final cut features elements from each of them. Matarazzo praised the choreography of the fight and how it reflected his and Keery's characters, explaining that "what I really do love about that fight is that, if I remember properly, he never swings at me once. He never hits me once. Everything he does is to get me away from him. He does push me against a wall and push me away from him, because I'm actively trying to hurt him".

Jamie Campbell Bower, who plays Vecna, stated that the scene where he threatens Derek is "the first time that Henry drops the act this season" and that he enjoyed the opportunity to "cut loose", noting that there is "always this bubbling rage going on underneath". Jake Connelly, Derek's portrayer, expressed that Bower's acting really helped his own performance in showing Derek's fear of Henry, feeling that he was "caught off guard".

=== Music ===
The episode features "Heart and Soul" by Floyd Cramer.

== Release ==
"Shock Jock" was released on December 25, 2025, on Netflix, alongside the two other episodes comprising Stranger Things season 5 volume 2.

== Reception ==
In a positive review, Tara Bennett of IGN wrote, "Darabont has a deft hand in keeping “Chapter Five” light on its feet, shifting between multiple settings, some high-concept quantum physics chatter, and several much-needed character moments". In a more mixed review, Kelly Lawler of USA Today noted her frustration at some of the plot developments, describing the reveal that Will does not actually have powers but instead channels them from Vecna when connected to the hive mind as "deeply disappointing from a storytelling and character point of view" and feeling as though it undercut Will's emotional character arc.

Audiences were angered over how Dustin and Steve break into a physical fight when their bond throughout the previous three seasons was heavily praised. They pointed out that throughout Season 5 in contrast, "Dustin and Steve are constantly snapping and yelling at each other, and projecting clear and continuous hate at each other in every scene where they're present, for no reason [I] can understand at all and with no effort by then or anyone else to resolve or defuse this aggression."
