= Chapter Seven: The Bridge =

- Stranger Things episode
- Promotional poster by Butcher Billy
- Episode no.: Season 5 Episode 7
- Directed by: The Duffer Brothers; Shawn Levy
- Written by: The Duffer Brothers
- Cinematography by: Caleb Heymann; Brett Jutkiewicz
- Editing by: Katheryn Naranjo; Dean Zimmerman
- Original air date: December 25, 2025
- Running time: 66 minutes

Guest appearances
- Sherman Augustus as Sullivan; Linnea Berthelsen as Kali / Eight; Alex Breaux as Robert Akers; Jake Connelly as Derek Turnbow; Nell Fisher as Holly Wheeler; Randy Havens as Scott Clarke; Amybeth McNulty as Vickie Dunne

Episode chronology
← Previous "Chapter Six: Escape from Camazotz"	Next → "Chapter Eight: The Rightside Up"
- Stranger Things season 5

"Chapter Seven: The Bridge" is the seventh and penultimate episode of the fifth season of the American science fiction horror drama television series Stranger Things. The 41st episode overall, and the series' penultimate episode, it was written by series creators The Duffer Brothers, who directed it with executive producer Shawn Levy. It was released on December 25, 2025, on Netflix alongside the previous two episodes as the finale of season five's volume two.

Set on November 6, 1987, the fourth anniversary of Will Byers' disappearance, the group reunites to prepare for the final battle against Henry / Vecna. As they finally understand what the Upside Down is, Holly's fate takes a darker turn, and Will reaches a moment of honesty that reshapes his role for the fight ahead.

The episode received mostly positive reviews from critics, who praised the convergence of the season's storylines, and the performances of the cast, particularly those of Sadie Sink, Caleb McLaughlin, and Noah Schnapp, but criticized some story decisions and felt it was underwhelming as the series' penultimate episode. The scene in which Will comes out was the subject of extensive debate by critics and audiences.

== Plot ==
Max slowly awakens in Lucas' arms and tells him that he was the emotional anchor that allowed her to return to the real world. She explains that she could not see where Holly Wheeler's portal led, but advised her to go to the Wheeler House in the Upside Down and wait to be rescued. Max warns that Henry will retaliate now that she has escaped. Holly awakens in Henry's lair in the Abyss, embedded in a wall with the other kidnapped children, and attempts to flee through a barren desert as Henry gives chase. She finds a gap in the ground and squeezes through, falling into the Upside Down. After regrouping with Dustin and Steve, Nancy and Jonathan report seeing Holly suspended in midair before she was pulled back into the sky. Will confesses to Joyce that he is unsure he is strong enough for the fight ahead.

Erica, Murray, and Mr. Clarke use a makeshift experiment to locate Dustin in the Upside Down, and Eleven accesses a rift, allowing the group to reunite. At the military base, Dr. Kay and Lt. Akers survey the damage from Henry’s attack including speaking to a badly injured Sullivan, who tells them about Vecna, and reiterates to Akers that her priority remains finding Eleven at any cost. Akers finds a breach at Hawkins Lab. There, he examines El’s removal of the steel plate, believing her to be growing sloppy and commanding that they go back to the dimension to find her. Dustin explains the true nature of the Upside Down, theorizing that Eleven inadvertently created it as a bridge between the real world and the Abyss when Brenner forced her to contact Henry. Will and Max add that Henry intends to merge the two worlds, and Lucas notes that the date is November 6, the anniversary of Will's disappearance, believing Henry will act that night.

Hopper proposes using a helicopter to reach the Abyss, but Steve instead suggests "Operation Beanstalk": allowing Henry to draw the worlds close enough for the group to climb the radio tower into the Abyss, ambush him psychically with Eleven, and rescue the children. Dustin adds that detonating the exotic matter overhead Hawkins Laboratory with a remotely triggered time bomb would destroy the Upside Down and prevent the Abyss from ever reconnecting with the real world. Max volunteers to guide Eleven through Henry's mind, and Kali insists on joining them. As preparations continue, Steve and Dustin reconcile, while Kali tells Eleven they must sacrifice themselves and remain in the Upside Down so the military cannot exploit them again. Will gathers the group and comes out as gay, explaining that Henry has used his secrets against him and that honesty is necessary to overcome his fear. Erica and Mr. Clarke open the military base, allowing Murray to drive Hopper, Eleven, Mike, Will, Joyce, Lucas, Dustin, Steve, Robin, Nancy, Jonathan, and Kali into the Upside Down. Max stays behind at the radio station with Vickie for safety.

In Henry’s mindscape, he convinces the other kidnapped children that Holly was manipulated by Max. When Holly tries to warn them of Henry’s true nature, they refuse to believe her, with Derek remaining silent, and force her to join them as Henry begins merging the worlds.

== Production ==
On December 11, 2025, Ross Duffer confirmed via Instagram that "Chapter Seven: The Bridge", along with "Chapter Five: Shock Jock" and "Chapter Six: Escape from Camazotz", had been completed. He noted that the episode was co-directed with Shawn Levy and described it as one of the season’s most emotional installments, stating that aside from the series finale, it was "probably the most emotional chapter of the season".

=== Writing ===
The episode was written by series creators The Duffer Brothers, marking their nineteenth writing credit on the series.

The Duffers stated that the second volume of season five was designed to bring the characters into emotional alignment before the final confrontation. While certain elements—such as Eleven's uncertainty about whether a happy ending is possible and Vecna's connection to the Mind Flayer—were intentionally held back for the series finale "Chapter Eight: The Rightside Up", the remaining episodes focused on resolving long-running personal and interpersonal arcs so that the characters could face the final battle "on the same page".

==== Confirmation of Will Byers' sexuality and coming-out scene ====
The Duffers confirmed that Will Byers' coming out as gay had been planned since early seasons, with an initial intention to include it in season four. They later determined that delaying the scene to season five allowed it to serve as a narrative culmination, with the season structured to build toward Will's self-acceptance. A season four monologue in which Will speaks about Mike's feelings for Eleven was originally conceived as the moment of disclosure, with subtext reflecting his feelings for Mike.

Early drafts of the episode limited Will's disclosure to Joyce, but the scene was rewritten so that Will comes out in front of the group. The Duffers stated that this change aligned the moment more directly with Vecna's manipulation of Will's fear of rejection and secrecy. Actor Noah Schnapp studied the coming out speech for his character for up to a month before shooting it.

Schnapp described the scene as "so freeing," noting that it paid off a storyline that had been developing since the first season. He stated that the writing closely reflected his own experiences as a gay teenager, while the Duffers emphasized that the scene underwent extensive revision to ensure emotional authenticity and to "do right by Noah."

==== Revealing the nature of the Upside Down ====
Ross Duffer stated that the Upside Down had been conceptualized as a wormhole since season one, but that season five required translating the idea into clear visual terms for the audience. Levy noted that Dustin Henderson's diagrammatic explanation in the episode closely resembled internal materials the Duffers had long used to describe the mythology to collaborators, calling it an effective way to communicate an abstract concept on screen.

=== Filming ===
The episode was directed by The Duffer Brothers alongside executive producer Shawn Levy. Levy's involvement was initially uncertain due to scheduling conflicts with the Marvel Cinematic Universe (MCU) film Deadpool & Wolverine (2024), but delays caused by the 2023 Hollywood labor disputes allowed him to co-direct the episode.

Schnapp stated that Will's coming-out scene was filmed primarily in extended takes, with editorial decisions shaping its final emotional tone. He noted that the process emphasized restraint as much as vulnerability, allowing the scene to balance intimacy with ensemble dynamics.

=== Music ===
The episode features "Running Up That Hill" by Kate Bush, "When It's Cold I'd Like to Die" by Moby and "Human Cannonball" by Butthole Surfers.

== Release ==
"The Bridge" was released on December 25, 2025, on Netflix, alongside the two previous episodes comprising Stranger Things season 5 volume 2.

== Reception ==
=== Critical response ===
In a mixed review, Tara Bennett of IGN praised the performances of the ensemble cast and the convergence of the season's various plotlines writing, "'Chapter Seven: The Bridge' is yet another grand convergence for the cast as all the various factions come back together at WSQK to figure out a plan strong enough to prevent Vecna from merging realities and wiping out their very existence. Everyone plays a part, including minor characters who share in the hero energy like Robin's girlfriend Vickie (Amybeth McNulty), Mr. Clark, and another feisty turn by Karen Wheeler (Cara Buono)." In a more muted review, Kelly Lawler of USA Today called the episode "a shockingly underwhelming conclusion to part two of three of the final season of a series as bombastic, twisty and relentless as Stranger Things", noting that "our villain Vecna (Jamie Campbell Bower) is in exactly the same place he was three episodes ago". She also questioned some other elements of the plot, feeling that there were several "convenient developments", such as Karen being convinced to stay in the hospital, Holly being kidnapped again, and Will's characterization during his early scenes in the episode with Joyce and his decision to come out to everyone, noting "his mom, his brother and all his friends declare their support and hug him, while his acquaintances look on awkwardly". Writing for Esquire, Brady Langmann praised the coming out scene, stating, "thankfully, the Duffers wrote a beautiful coming-out scene for Will" but felt the scenes at the Creel House with Holly and the other children were inexplicable. Daniel D'Addario of Variety also lauded the scene, writing that "a pivotal character opening up about being queer on a show as massive as Stranger Things, feels seismic — and, oddly, like the culmination of a very long journey" and praised the writing, declaring that it "strikes an emotional chord".

Giving the episode a B+ grade, Saloni Gajjar of The A.V. Club declared that "Stranger Things packs an emotional punch as it sets the stage for its finale" and praised the "much-welcome reunion" of the characters in the episode. They also praised the reconciliation of Steve and Dustin, and the performances of Sadie Sink and Caleb McLaughlin in the opening at the hospital, stating, "Sink, a natural scene-stealer, and McLaughlin turn in season five's strongest performances in this scene". Of Will's coming out scene, they stated, "it's a very moving (although, admittedly, a little cheesy) speech that ends in a big group hug. Aww. I do think watching it will be beneficial to younger ST fans, but it's a bit wild to shoehorn this huge moment right at the end of the penultimate hour." They also praised the directing, writing that "one of the most badass Stranger Things shots of all time is when Nancy pops out of the truck's roof wearing military gear, professionally shooting at all the people who are stopping them from entering the Upside Down." Jen Chaney of TV Guide also praised Will's coming out, noting that while it "may seem a bit pat and unrealistic" for someone in the 80s to be so readily accepted, "to show a young man claiming his identity and being met with nothing but love, especially during what has been one of the more terrifying years to be a queer person in America in quite some time, is still a powerful thing for a mass audience to see and absorb. Maybe it isn't executed with quite the elegance that it could have been. But it matters, especially to any of those Gen Z-ers who have been watching Stranger Things since elementary school and feeling afraid to be who they are. Their favorite show just showed them that they can, and it will be OK." Rebecca Luther of TVLine also lauded the scene, declaring it "the Will Byers moment we've been waiting for", and calling the moment Will comes out as "cathartic" and praised Schnapp's performance, describing him as "excellent" during his extended monologue.

Will Byers' coming out scene was not well received by all commentators. Michael Block of Collider called it a "press conference" and "one of the most cringe inducing coming out scenes in recent memory". Ben Rosenstock of Vulture opined that the scene "didn't work", blaming "uneven writing" and suggested that the scene was symptomatic of the decline in writing for Will in later seasons of the series compared to the first two seasons. Rosenstock also felt Schnapp's performance had regressed in later seasons, suggesting that Schnapp along with some of the other cast members was struggling to make the transition from a child actor into a "confident adult actor".

=== Audience response ===
Upon release, the episode became the lowest-rated of the series on IMDb with a score of 5.6, based on over 190,000 user ratings. Several publications reported that the episode had suffered from alleged review bombing, seemingly in response to the scene of Will coming out, and noted that the IMDb score suggested that users were either rating the episode at 1/10, a typical tactic for review bombing, or 10/10 in an attempt to counteract the low ratings. Various reasons were proposed for the bombing, including homophobia, and issues from some fans with either the writing, plot, or performances. Will's coming-out scene was parodied on the January 17, 2026 episode of Saturday Night Live, which was hosted by Finn Wolfhard and featured fellow co-stars Gaten Matarazzo and Caleb McLaughlin; Cinemablend opined the skit reflected fan reaction towards the scene. For the skit, Will was played by Saturday Night Live's featured comedian Jeremy Culhane.
