= Chapter Six: Escape from Camazotz =

- Stranger Things episode
- Promotional poster by Butcher Billy
- Episode no.: Season 5 Episode 6
- Directed by: Shawn Levy
- Written by: Kate Trefry
- Cinematography by: Brett Jutkiewicz
- Editing by: Katheryn Naranjo; Dean Zimmerman
- Original air date: December 25, 2025
- Running time: 75 minutes

Guest appearances
- Linnea Berthelsen as Kali / Eight; Nell Fisher as Holly Wheeler; Randy Havens as Scott Clarke; Amybeth McNulty as Vickie Dunne

Episode chronology
← Previous "Chapter Five: Shock Jock"	Next → "Chapter Seven: The Bridge"
- Stranger Things season 5

"Chapter Six: Escape from Camazotz" is the sixth episode of the fifth season of the American science fiction horror drama television series Stranger Things. The 40th episode overall, it was written by Kate Trefry and directed by series executive producer Shawn Levy. It was released on December 25, 2025, on Netflix alongside the other episodes of season five's volume two.

In this episode, set on November 5 and 6, 1987, Max and Holly fight to escape from Henry Creel's mindscape, while Eleven tries to find a way into Will's. In the Upside Down, Nancy and Jonathan reach a turning point in their relationship.

The episode received mostly positive reviews from critics, particularly regarding the performances of Gaten Matarazzo, Caleb McLaughlin, Sadie Sink, Natalia Dyer, Charlie Heaton, Joe Keery, and Nell Fisher.

== Plot ==
In the Upside Down, Dustin races through Hawkins Laboratory attempting to reach Nancy and Jonathan. He encounters Steve and explains that Dr. Brenner’s research confirms the Upside Down is not another dimension, but a wormhole between the real world and another dimension. The wall acts as a containment field and the energy sphere above the lab composed of exotic matter holds it together. On the roof, the sphere emits a shockwave after being shot by Nancy, knocking her and Jonathan into the lab. The blast breaches the wall, causing parts of the Upside Down to be pulled into the surrounding void. Hopper, Eleven, and Kali escape back to Hawkins through a gate using Eleven's powers.

Inside the lab, the structure begins to melt, trapping Nancy and Jonathan. Steve rushes to save them, but Dustin stops him, admitting he cannot bear losing another friend after Eddie's death. The two reconcile and agree to proceed carefully. Believing they are about to die, Nancy and Jonathan confront the reality of their dwindling relationship. Jonathan reveals that he once planned to propose but instead asks Nancy not to marry him. They mutually agree to end their relationship, recognizing that they want different futures. Shortly afterward, the melting halts and the structure solidifies, sparing them.

In Hawkins, Will remains unresponsive as Mike, Lucas, and Robin try to understand what happened to him. Robin theorizes that Will witnessed Max and Holly inside Henry’s mind and that Max may return to her body if she escapes. Will awakens in Henry's lair, bound by tendrils, where Henry reveals he previously used Will to create the tunnels beneath Hawkins (Note: As depicted in the second season episode "Chapter Four: Will the Wise" (2017)) and intends to use him again to locate Max. Meanwhile, Eleven, Hopper, and Kali reunite with Mike and Joyce at the radio station. Eleven tells Mike she fears killing Henry may not end the threat, as his blood remains within her. Henry uses his link to Will to locate Max's body in the hospital moments before Eleven can reach him, and Will awakens in the real world to warn the others that Henry intends to kill Max.

In Henry's mindscape, Holly and Max hide in their cave. Henry attempts to persuade Holly to abandon Max and return to him, but she refuses. Max believes an escape route must exist within Henry’s memories but has exhausted her search. Holly insists on exploring further, and together they discover a mine containing a childhood memory in which a young Henry encounters an injured man with a briefcase, kills him, and opens it. At the hospital, Robin is confronted by Vickie over stolen drugs and becomes aware of the military’s arrival. She is apprehended, but Demodogs begin spawning in the building, allowing Robin and Vickie to escape and warn Lucas. They are cornered in the laundry room but are rescued by Karen, who triggers an explosion by placing oxygen tanks in the dryer, killing the creatures.

Holly and Max eventually locate portals leading back to their bodies. Max tells Holly that she must find her own emotional connection to escape, urging her to draw on her own courage. She instructs Holly to hide at the Wheeler house in the Upside Down until help arrives. The two embrace and run in opposite directions.

== Production ==
On December 11, 2025, Ross Duffer posted to Instagram, confirming that "Chapter Six: Escape from Camazotz", along with volume two's other episodes, "Chapter Five: Shock Jock" and "Chapter Seven: The Bridge", were complete. Regarding the episode, he teased, "“Escape from Camazotz” is Shawn Levy’s return to the director’s chair. It’s the biggest episode of the three— and the performances make us cry every time we watch it".

=== Writing ===
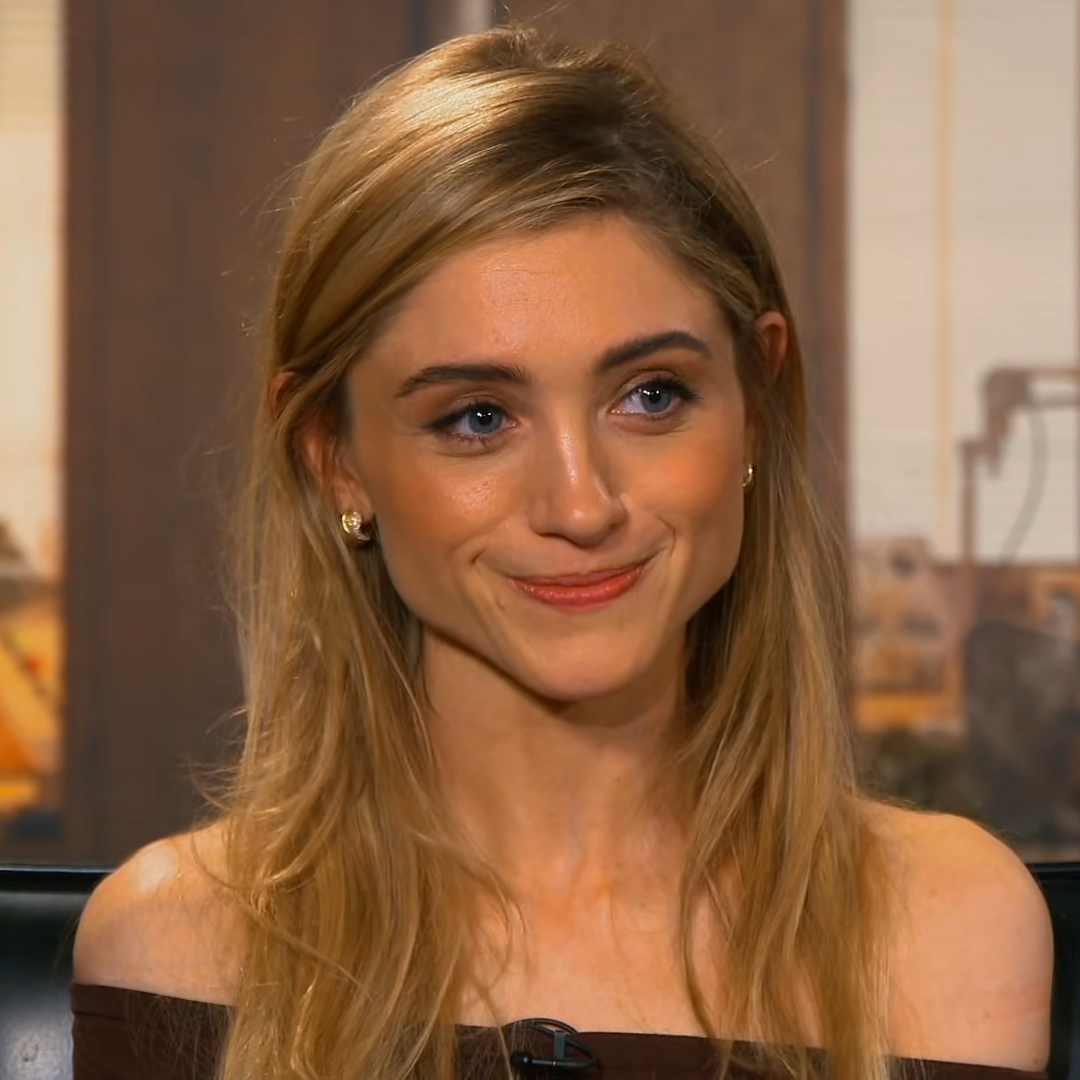
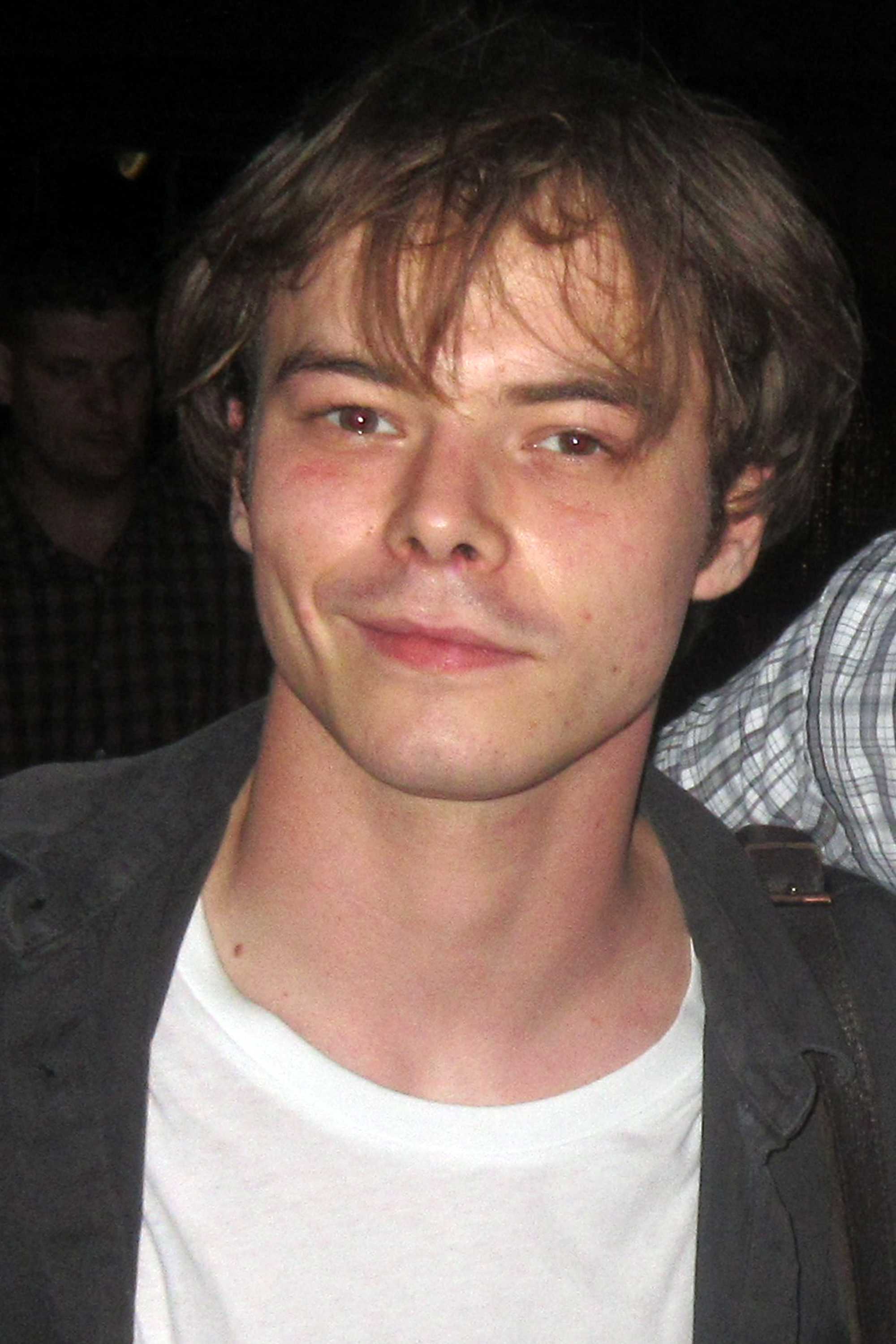
The relationship between Nancy Wheeler and Jonathan Byers, portrayed by Natalia Dyer and Charlie Heaton, reached its conclusion in this episode.

The episode was written by Kate Trefry, marking her first writing credit on the show and second credit overall after contributing to the story of "Chapter Eight: The Upside Down" in season one. Save for Eleven's dilemma over if happy endings are possible and both Vecna's backstory and his connection to the Mind Flayer, whom they deemed would be most impactful and revelatory in the series finale "Chapter Eight: The Rightside Up", series creators The Duffer Brothers felt it was important for all of their characters to head into the final battle by really resolving all of their internal and external conflicts either within themselves or with others as they had to be at the best of their ability and on the same page if they are going to be able to defeat the great evil, so they dedicated all of the fifth season's second volume episodes to resolve all of those plots such as Jonathan Byers and Nancy Wheeler's on and off romance.

Discussing the conclusion of Nancy and Jonathan's relationship, the Duffers stated that the scene between the two in the melting laboratory was the one they spent the second longest on in season five. Of the decision for them to break up, Matt Duffer explained, "it’s very messy, because they do love each other very much, but we always felt that at the end of the day, they need to let each other go in order to grow as people and be independent" and praised the performances of Natalia Dyer and Charlie Heaton. Duffer further referred to the pair's connection as a "trauma bond" and that the show's creative team had known for "a while" that this is how their story would end. Upon reading the outline for the pair's "un-proposal" scene in the melting room of the Hawkins National Laboratory version of the Upside Down, Shawn Levy felt that whoever ended up directing the episode would have a "major headache" figuring out how to pull out such sequence, a task which ironically befell on himself and forced him into six or eight months of preparation, due to it requiring engineering, major special effects, ingenuity and research while also taking on the scene's premise of a potentially lethal melting room but slowly and subtly recede into the background to focus on the emotional stakes, which become foreground.

Of the titular escape by Max Mayfield and Holly Wheeler, Sadie Sink who portrays Max, felt it was "really fitting" that she was saved by Holly rather than a character with powers, stating "That’s what the show has always celebrated and stood for — young kids persevering through these huge obstacles and coming out as heroes at the end. Also, to not have it be some huge, otherworldly thing. I mean, obviously they’re in a realm, and they’re running through the red void or whatever, but it’s coming from somewhere from within that gives them the power to find their exit". In regards to the traumatic memory from a young Henry Creel being attacked at a mineshaft by an unknown scientist whom he murders and steals his briefcase's obscured contents for himself, a development first alluded by Dr. Martin Brenner in the prequel play Stranger Things: The First Shadow (2023) and which Max and Holly partially witness before the former manages to escape from Camazotz, the Duffers assured that the audience that they had only seen "half of that core memory" and that the briefcase would reappear in the finale.

=== Filming ===
The episode was directed by Shawn Levy, his ninth directing credit on the series. Initially, Levy was unsure whether he would be able to direct any episodes of the show's fifth season, as it was expected the season's shooting schedule would overlap with the filming of the Marvel Cinematic Universe (MCU) film Deadpool & Wolverine (2024), which Levy was hired by Marvel Studios to direct. Levy explained that one of the first conversations he had with Deadpool star and producer Ryan Reynolds and Marvel Studios was to work out the filming schedules so he would be able to direct at least one episode of the fifth Stranger Things season. Both productions were later impacted by the 2023 Hollywood labor disputes. Despite never expecting to direct the sixth episode before his calendar "sort of mandated it", Levy storyboarded the melting room scene as he edited Deadpool & Wolverine due to knowing how hard it would be, so he expressed gratefulness that Heaton and Dyer, who respectively portray Jonathan and Nancy, came prepared and ready to deliver, leaving him to focus on their characters' relationship and its resolution.

Heaton explained that the scene in the melting laboratory was the last one he and Dyer shot for the episode, and that they both spent about a month preparing, expressing that they "wanted to make sure that we were so familiar with it that we didn't have to think about it anymore", allowing them to focus on conveying the honesty and emotion of the scene during filming. Dyer stated that Levy helped "guide" them during the scene, and felt that the physical challenge of the environment helped "add to the energy". The melting room was a large undertaking, with the production design, visual effects, costuming and hair and makeup teams all working collaboratively to create the desired effect. It approximately took three days according to Levy to shoot the melting room scene, which by sheer page amount, was the longest two-hander dialogue scene they ever had in the show's history, with the visuals and the performances sustaining a runtime that very few of their other two-hander scenes in the series ever had.

Maya Hawke, who plays Robin Buckley, said the filming of the attack at the hospital as her favorite part of the season, citing the combination of a "big action sequence" that is also "brimming with emotional stakes". Levy referred to it as a "director's playground" that he found both "challenging and fun", with part of the scene being filmed as a oner to allow the audience to feel as though they were experiencing the danger alongside the characters. Caleb McLaughlin, who portrays Lucas Sinclair, also called it his "favorite week of filming", and felt that his character's determination to protect Max from the Demodogs is spurred by his failure to save her in the season four finale "Chapter Nine: The Piggyback". He also explained that Levy's direction brought out a "competitive spirit" in him that enabled him to spend several hours filming the scenes while carrying Sadie Sink in his arms. Several stunt performers were used as stand-ins for the Demodogs to help Levy and the actors visualize what was happening. Hawke called Karen's entrance "the perfect punctuation mark" to the scene, while Levy referred to it as a "cheer moment". Cara Buono, who plays Karen, expressed that she was "beyond excited" when she read the script and enjoyed the opportunity to "be part of the action" with the rest of the cast.

=== Music ===
The episode features "Running Up That Hill" by Kate Bush. Levy realized that the episode's use of a red void while featuring Max is a direct callback to the season four episode "Chapter Four: Dear Billy", and thus opted to reprise the orchestral version of "Running Up That Hill" from that episode to connect those moments thematically.

== Release ==
"Escape from Camazotz" was released on December 25, 2025, on Netflix, alongside the two other episodes comprising Stranger Things season 5 volume 2.

== Reception ==
In a positive review, Tara Bennett of IGN praised the strength of the writing despite the heavy amount of exposition in the episode, stating, "all the praise to writer Kate Trefry for packing a tremendous amount of science talk into this segment while parceling it out in ways that make it understandable for all the Steve Harringtons in the house." She also lauded the performance of Nell Fisher as Holly, declaring her a "charming addition to the line-up so late in the game" and noting that she "holds her own in every emotional scene" with Sadie Sink and "does the character work needed to invest the audience in her plight". Samathan Nelson of Polygon praised the Nancy and Jonathan scenes, writing that they resolved the love triangle between Nancy, Jonathan, and Steve in "a deeply satisfying way that bucks clichés to give every character what they need". She also called "Escape from Camazotz" the "strongest episode of the season’s volume 2 episode drop" for taking the time to resolve the relationship dynamics between the characters.
