= Chapter Eight: The Rightside Up =

- Stranger Things episode
- Promotional poster by Kyle Lambert
- Episode no.: Season 5 Episode 8
- Directed by: The Duffer Brothers
- Written by: The Duffer Brothers
- Cinematography by: Caleb Heymann
- Editing by: Casey Cichocki; Dean Zimmerman
- Original air date: December 31, 2025
- Running time: 128 minutes

Guest appearances
- Linnea Berthelsen as Kali / Eight; Alex Breaux as Robert Akers; Jake Connelly as Derek Turnbow; Joe Chrest as Ted Wheeler; Randy Havens as Scott Clarke; Amybeth McNulty as Vickie Dunne; Sydney Bullock as Stacey Albright; Karen Ceesay as Sue Sinclair; Catherine Curtin as Claudia Henderson; Frederick Koehler as Scientist; Arnell Powell as Charles Sinclair

Episode chronology
← Previous "Chapter Seven: The Bridge"	Next → —
- Stranger Things season 5

"Chapter Eight: The Rightside Up" is the series finale of the American science fiction horror drama television series Stranger Things. The eighth episode of the fifth season and the 42nd overall, it was written and directed by series creators The Duffer Brothers. The episode was released on December 31, 2025, on Netflix and in select theatres across the United States and Canada. Its title parallels "Chapter Eight: The Upside Down", the title of the first season's finale.

In the episode, the group enters the Upside Down one last time in a desperate attempt to complete "Operation Beanstalk" by Steve Harrington to save the world. While the others focus on rescuing the kidnapped children, Eleven, Will, Max, and Kali aim to confront and end Henry Creel / Vecna. "The Rightside Up" received positive reviews from critics, who praised the visual effects and the performances of Finn Wolfhard, Millie Bobby Brown and Jamie Campbell Bower, while audience reception was polarized.

== Plot ==
In the Upside Down, Mike, Will, Joyce, Lucas, Dustin, Steve, Robin, Nancy, and Jonathan climb the WSQK radio tower in an effort to reach the descending Abyss. At Hawkins Lab, Eleven, Hopper, Murray, and Kali prepare a sensory deprivation tank, allowing Eleven to enter Henry Creel / Vecna's mindscape. Kali and Max are drawn in with her to search Henry's memories.

While climbing the tower, Mike apologizes to Will for ignoring his struggles with his sexuality, reaffirming their friendship. As the group reaches the top, the Abyss begins to descend and collides with the tower, destabilizing it; Steve nearly falls to his death before Jonathan pulls him to safety. In the mindscape, Eleven's group locates Holly and the other abducted children inside the Creel House. Kali hides them while Eleven attacks Henry, buying time for the tower group to reach the Abyss. Henry manipulates Hopper by showing him a vision revealing Eleven plans to die alongside Kali, prompting Hopper to pull Eleven from the tank and beg her to live. Elsewhere, Dr. Kay's forces capture Max and Vickie. Akers' team launches an assault on Hawkins Lab and threatens Kali to force Hopper to reveal Eleven's location. Murray uses a grenade to destroy the military helicopter, which is equipped with a sound emitter suppressing Eleven's powers, enabling Eleven to snap the soldiers' necks and force Akers to shoot himself in the head, though Kali is mortally wounded by a stray bullet and dies. Eleven resolves to confront Henry directly and makes Hopper promise to accept her decision.

In the mindscape, Henry pursues the children into the cave and is forced to relive his past. Holly leads the children into the mine and attacks Henry to buy time. Henry recalls opening a briefcase as a child and becoming corrupted by a fragment of the Mind Flayer. Will pleads with him to destroy it, but Henry refuses, declaring that he and the Mind Flayer are one. In the Abyss, Henry's lair is revealed to be the physical form of the Mind Flayer, which rises as a colossal spider-like creature and attacks the group. Eleven arrives and battles Henry inside the monster, while Nancy draws it into position, allowing the group to use fire and explosives to weaken and kill it. With Will helping by ripping off Henry's arm, Eleven impales him, freeing the children, and Joyce kills him by decapitating him with an axe.

Hopper and Murray arm a time bomb to destroy the Upside Down. When the group returns to Hawkins, Kay and the military—again suppressing Eleven's powers—ambush them. The group quickly realizes Eleven is not with them, only to see her intentionally staying behind. In a final shared moment within her mind, Eleven says goodbye, tells Mike to thank the group for their kindness, and professes her love for him, asking him to understand her choice and to help the others understand as well. The explosives detonate, destroying the Upside Down, closing the gates, and seemingly taking Eleven with it.

By the spring of 1989, Hawkins is rebuilding and the military has withdrawn. Hopper urges a grieving Mike to move forward and attend graduation. Dustin, now valedictorian, honors Eddie Munson in a defiant speech. Steve, Robin, Nancy, and Jonathan reunite at the radio station, having taken odd jobs and pursued their studies individually. Although they fear drifting apart, all four promise to stay in touch. Hopper and Joyce go on a date at Enzo's, where Hopper proposes, and Joyce accepts; he also suggests moving the family to Montauk, where he has been offered a higher-paying job as chief of police.

After a Dungeons & Dragons game at the Wheeler house, now including Max, Mike predicts the futures of the group: Max and Lucas finally go on the movie date they promised to each other, Dustin is a full-time college student but still meets up with his friends whenever he can, Will moves out of Hawkins and feels like he belongs for the first time in his life, while Mike continues to write stories about the group's adventures. He then reasons that Eleven would not have been able to vanish into the Upside Down while her powers were suppressed by the military, and theorizes that Kali, who did not bleed out immediately, used the last of her abilities to project a false Eleven, allowing the real Eleven to escape and go somewhere far away to live in peace. Choosing to believe this, the group tearfully puts away their D&D binders as they head for dinner, while Mike lingers to watch Holly and her friends begin a new D&D campaign before closing the door.

== Production ==
The final table read took place on September 8, 2024, and was attended by series creators the Duffer Brothers, executive producer Shawn Levy and the cast. It was the first time the cast had seen the script for the finale, allowing them to experience the last episode together.

Finn Wolfhard said that he was initially concerned the episode could have a negative reception like "The Iron Throne", the series finale of Game of Thrones (2011–2019), but when he read the script, he knew that "it was something special". Despite their love for Game of Thrones, the Duffers felt Stranger Things was a very different type of show to theirs and made sure their own finale avoided excessive character deaths and gave the audience a feeling of satisfaction.

The prequel play Stranger Things: The First Shadow (2023) hinted that the Mind Flayer was what made Henry Creel accept his dark side and connection to the Upside Down, and Matt Duffer hinted that the series finale would finally reveal who "the real evil is". The brothers also stated that the finale would show viewers the second half of the "core memory" from "Chapter Six: Escape from Camazotz", revealing what happened to a young Henry Creel in the mineshaft.

=== Writing ===
The episode was written and directed by the Duffer Brothers, marking their twentieth writing credits on the show.

The Duffers stated that some unused ideas originally conceived for the second season were implemented throughout the fifth and final season's storylines and that the impact of the COVID-19 pandemic enabled them to completely outline the final season before the fourth season had even been filmed. Following the release of the fourth season, the team were able to rewrite some elements in response to feedback, particularly the finale, but noted that much of their original pitch to Netflix remained unchanged. Levy recounted that the Duffers had pitched the season and its finale to him and others in the production team as early as 2023, showing them a diorama explaining the Upside Down's mythology and their plans to conclude the show "emotionally". Leading up to the finale, the fifth season revealed the truth about the Upside Down and wrapped up a number of major character arcs in preparation for the final battle against Vecna.

The Duffers added that Dustin's valedictorian speech was inspired by the loss of Eddie, adding that Dustin does a lot of the things Eddie told him he wanted to do at his own graduation prior to his death and felt the speech summed up one of the major themes of the show, stating, "this is a story about outsiders and outcasts. It's about banding together and embracing your otherness to defeat the evils of this world". The Duffers discussed featuring the Demogorgons in the final battle with Vecna and the Mind Flayer, with one idea having the group come across a large field of eggs. However, the idea was not pursued as they felt that showing the Demogorgons would have felt repetitive by then, or "Demo fatigue" as they called it; fans perceived this absence as a major plot hole.

Noah Schnapp revealed that he requested that the Duffers write the scene between Will and Mike where the latter reaffirms their friendship, feeling it was important to include following Will's coming out in the previous episode in order to give the relationship closure. He also spoke positively of Will's ending, calling it "perfect" and stating, "it felt really hopeful to see what the future can hold for a character like that, that I also kind of relate to, at least in terms of sexual identity. It was nice to see him get his happy ending and learn that it was never about Mike. It was about finding the person that was right for him, and in the meantime, kind of just loving himself".

==== Vecna's backstory and fate ====
The episode reveals that Henry Creel was corrupted by the Mind Flayer as a child, as detailed in The First Shadow. The Duffers explained that they did briefly consider having Henry turn on the Mind Flayer but, following discussions with the other writers and with actor Jamie Campbell Bower, concluded that "he's gone so far at this point to get here, he has to justify everything he's done. And the only way to justify that is to go, "I chose this, and I believe in this still. Even though he is shaken by seeing this memory, he's too far gone at this point to turn against the Mind Flayer." They chose to leave it up to the audience whether the Mind Flayer was controlling Henry from the beginning or whether young Henry chose to embrace the evil, noting that "it doesn't matter because he chooses the side of the Mind Flayer at the end of the day". They felt that Joyce had to be the one who delivered the final blow to Vecna, although they considered multiple characters before coming to a decision, explaining, "Joyce was the one in the first season who's the first one to really take action, to believe that something strange was going on. And that fierce love she has for not only Will but her family and the others is a superpower in its own way. And so we thought if anyone is going to defeat this guy, it had to be Joyce."

==== Fate of Eleven ====
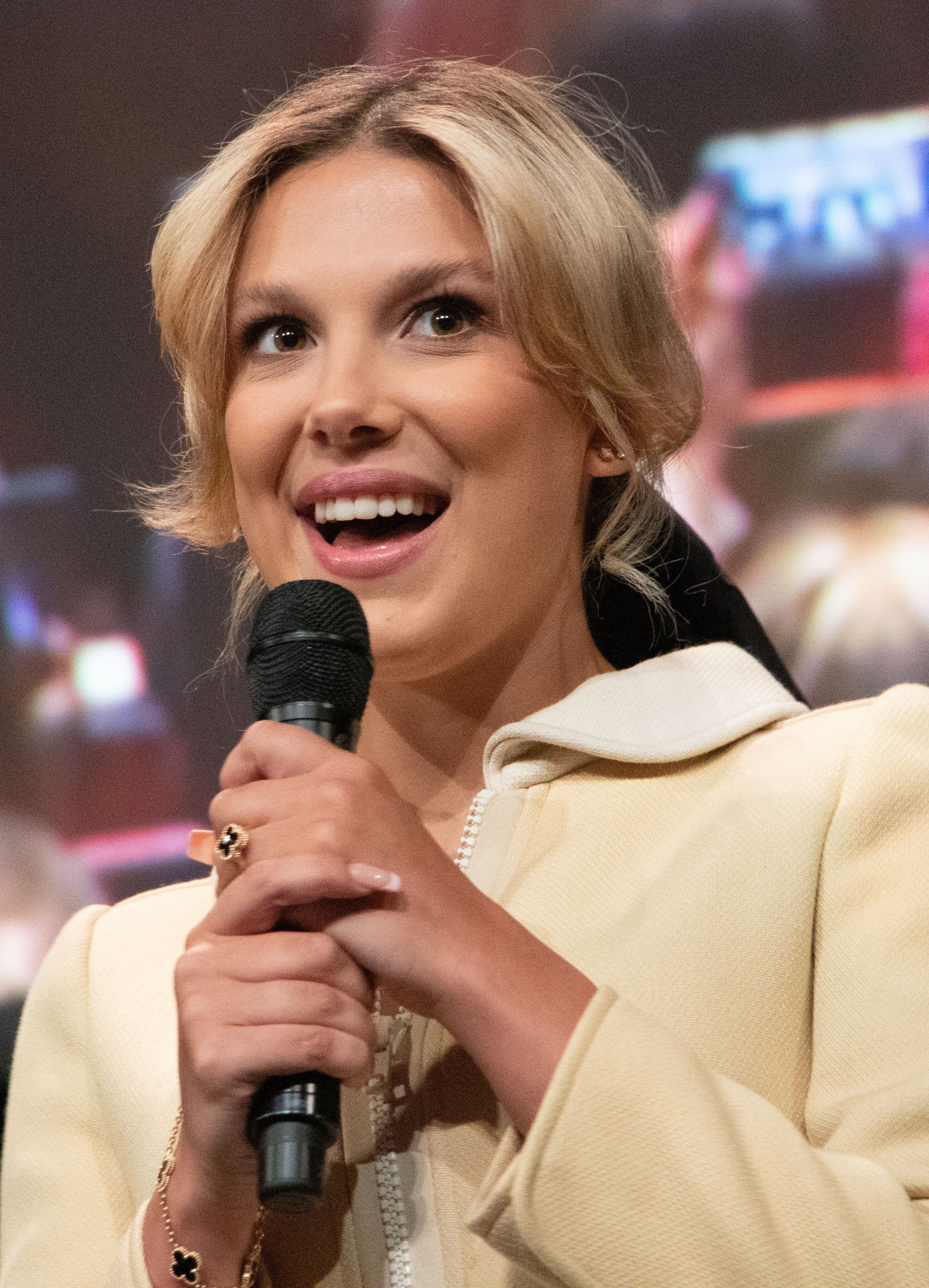
The fate of Eleven, portrayed by Millie Bobby Brown, was purposefully left ambiguous by the Duffer Brothers.

Regarding the ambiguous ending for Eleven, Matt Duffer stated, "there are two roads that Eleven could take. There's this darker, more pessimistic one or the optimistic, hopeful one. Mike is the optimist of the group and has chosen to believe in that story." Ross Duffer noted "there was never a version of the story where Eleven was hanging out with the gang at the end" and that they felt "Eleven had to go away" in order for the story and the rest of the characters to move on, adding that "we thought it would be beautiful if our characters continued to believe in that happier ending even if we didn't give them a clear answer to whether that's true or not. The fact that they're believing in it, we just thought it was such a better way to end the story and a better way to represent the closure of this journey and their journey from children to adults". They added that Eleven's discussions with Hopper throughout the episode mirror these themes of coming-of-age, noting that "part of coming of age is leaving your parents and making your own decisions", and that Hopper has to finally accept that Eleven is her own person and move on from his guilt over the death of his daughter.

=== Filming ===
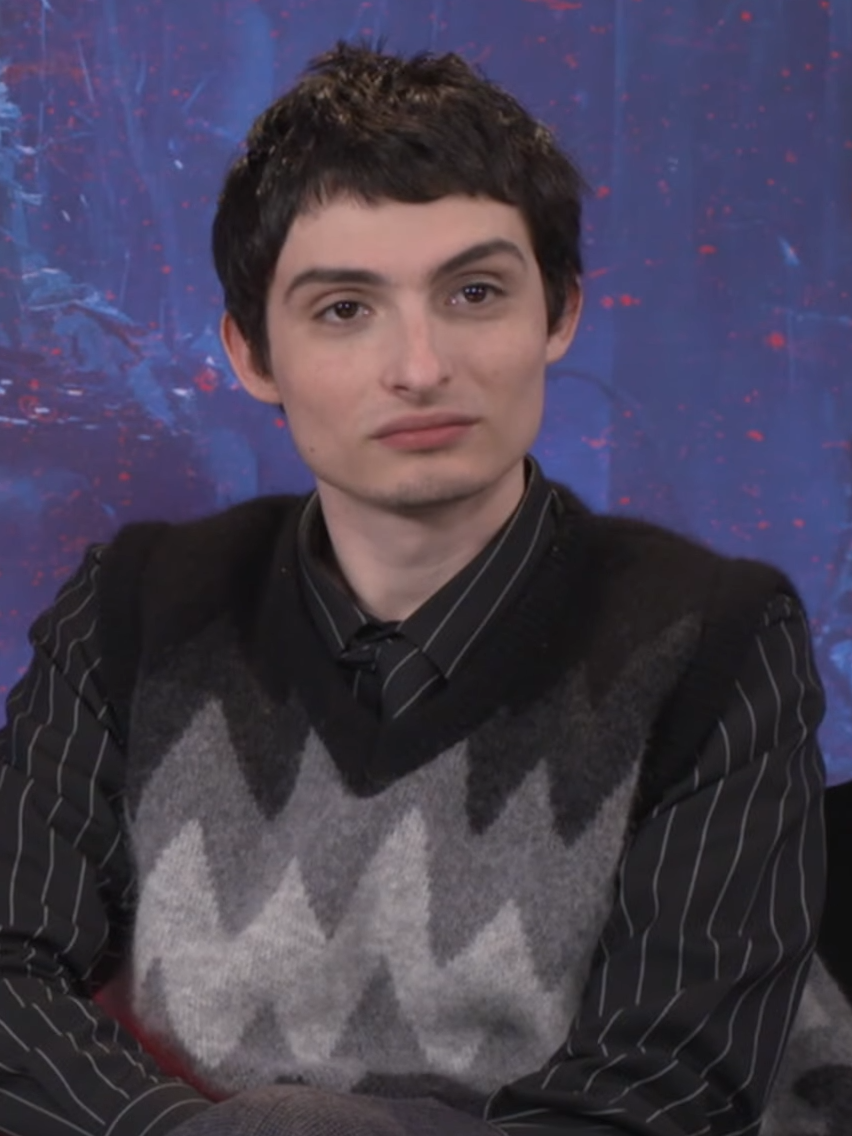
Finn Wolfhard, who plays Mike, anchors the final scene, and has emotional scenes with several characters. His performance throughout the episode was praised by critics.

The production team managed to structure the filming schedule of the finale so every actor's last day of filming was their last scene in the show. Joe Keery revealed that everyone felt some "fatigue" after filming for a year, but described the material as "incredible". Some of the cast, such as Nell Fisher, had also filmed scenes from the finale prior to the table read.

When filming the finale, the Duffers stated that one of their main goals was to "make sure that every character had something very specific to do" and have all of them contribute towards Vecna's defeat in a "meaningful way". The scenes in the Abyss were filmed on a quarry set in Atlanta that was based on scans and photos of a protected canyon in New Mexico, and the crew used an iPad with a digital version of the Mind Flayer, which was designed by Wētā FX, to help the cast and crew visualize and frame the battle scenes. The set for the inside of Vecna's lair took around five months to construct, and significant wire work was used for Brown and Bower to help them mobilize around the set during their final confrontation and make it seem realistic.

The Duffers explained that the final shot, depicting Mike closing the door to his basement, was going to be the definitive ending "for a very long time", and stated that the final sequence of each of the party exiting the basement one by one symbolized "them leaving their childhood behind". They felt the party playing D&D one final time brought the series full circle, referencing the opening of the first episode, and consciously tried to mimic the camera shots from that episode. Matt Duffer praised Finn Wolfhard's performance, expressing that "you see him go through this real grief and sadness about leaving it behind" before landing on the "bittersweet happiness" of seeing Holly and her friends, a moment the Duffers considered a passing of the torch to the next generation of kids. They spoke to each of the actors when determining the ending of their characters, and ultimately felt that everyone was continuing "on the journeys they started" in season five, and expressed that the cast were all "content" with their resolutions.

Schnapp described the filming of the final scenes as emotional, and expressed that he struggled to complete the take because of this. He explained that once the scene was completed, he, Wolfhard, Matarazzo, McLaughlin, and Sink silently embraced alone on the set before going out to celebrate wrapping the series with the rest of the cast and crew. He revealed that the five of them slept on the set that night and described that experience as "a perfect way to end" their time on the show.

=== Music ===
The episode features "Sh-Boom" by The Chords, "When Doves Cry" and "Purple Rain" by Prince and The Revolution, "Landslide" by Fleetwood Mac, "Here Comes Your Man" by Pixies, "The Trooper" by Iron Maiden, "Sweet Jane" by Cowboy Junkies, and the single version of "'Heroes'" by David Bowie. It also features a cover of "At Last", popularized by Etta James, during Hopper and Joyce's engagement scene.

Prior to the episode's release, the Duffer Brothers teased that a song "never before seen in a television show" would be featured. These songs were subsequently revealed in the episode to be "When Doves Cry" and "Purple Rain". Discussing this decision, Ross Duffer explained, "once we came up with the idea that the record was going to be the trigger for the bomb, we knew we needed an epic needle drop, and so many ideas were thrown around. I think there's nothing really more epic than Prince". They noted that Prince's estate rarely allows his music to be licensed, with the Purple Rain (1984) film having been a rare exception, and that they were told it was "a real long shot" that the usage of his songs would be approved. The Duffers stated that they strongly felt "Purple Rain" would "sum up the emotion of the moment" and credited the success of their use of Kate Bush's "Running Up That Hill" in the fourth season as the primary reason they were able to secure the rights to Prince's music. The Duffers explained that it was Joe Keery's idea to use Bowie's "'Heroes'" for the episode's end credits, believing it to be a fitting conclusion to the series. A cover of the song by Peter Gabriel was previously used in earlier seasons.

Following the release of the episode, Prince saw a significant boost in Spotify streams across his catalogue, particularly the two songs that featured in the finale. "When Doves Cry" earned a 200% increase in streams, while streams of "Purple Rain" increased by 243%. His catalogue overall achieved a 190% increase. "'Heroes'" by Bowie also saw an approximate 3.6 to 5 times increase in streams following the release of the episode. On the UK singles chart, "Purple Rain" returned to the chart for the first time since Prince's death, entering at number 12, while "Landslide" appeared on the chart for the first time ever, debuting at number 20.

Despite not being part of the series' soundtrack, Keery's song "End of Beginning", which was released under his musical alias Djo in 2022, topped the UK singles chart and peaked at number six on the US Billboard Hot 100 after the episode was released. Additionally, "In the End" by Linkin Park saw a resurgence in popularity after the Abyss was compared to the scenery of the music video for that song. Nathan Cox, who directed the video for "In the End", called the Internet memes spawned by the comparison "hilarious". The band themselves also responded by incorporating the Stranger Things theme song prior to performing "In the End" at the Asian shows of the From Zero World Tour.

== Release ==
The fifth season of Stranger Things was released in three segments, with the first volume of four episodes releasing on November 26 and the second volume of three episodes releasing on December 25. "Chapter Eight: The Rightside Up" was released on December 31, 2025.

The episode also had a limited theatrical release in the United States and Canada from the evening of December 31, 2025, through January 1, 2026. It was previously reported that the finale would not be released in theaters because most viewers watched the series on Netflix and to give them "what they want", however, it subsequently was reported that the plan to release the finale in theaters had been "in the works for some time", with Ross Duffer stating that this had been the plan for over a year. The finale was screened at 620 theaters with pre-sales of 1.1 million tickets, which were sold as concession vouchers rather than traditional admissions due to issues with the cast's residuals contracts. The theatrical release generated over $25 million in concession income.

== Reception ==
=== Critical response ===
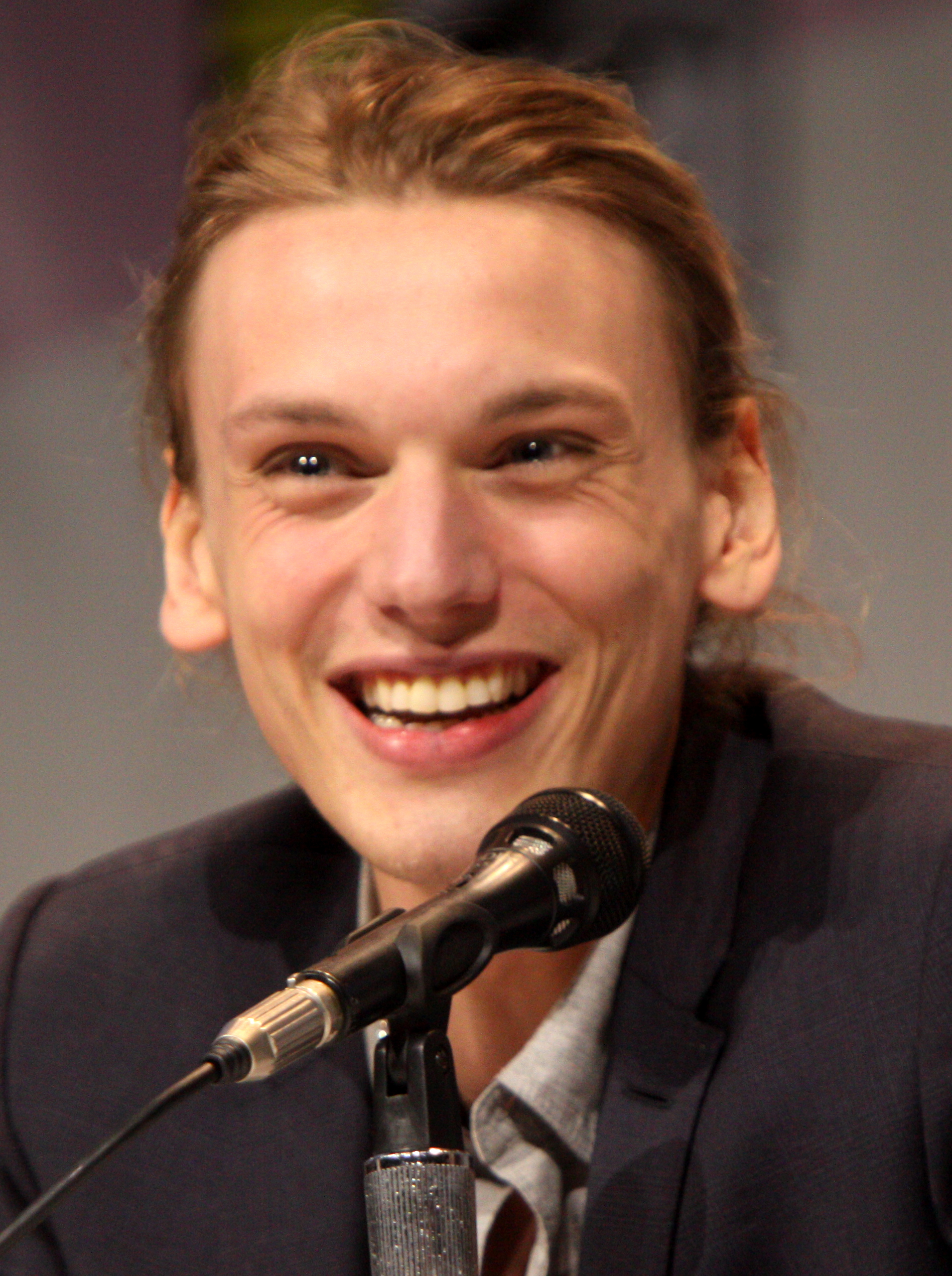
Jamie Campbell Bower's performance as Henry Creel / Vecna in the episode was praised by critics.

"The Rightside Up" received positive reviews from critics, who praised its performances (particularly Jamie Campbell Bower's) and the visual effects, though some criticism was given to the handling of the fate of Eleven, the Abyss sequences, and the military subplot. In a four-star review, Ed Power of The Daily Telegraph wrote, "it might so easily have been another underwhelming conclusion to a beloved series, but across two hours it wore its feelings on its sleeves" and felt the finale was a "big, weepy send-off [that] justifies the hype", praising the epilogue for bringing "proper, poignant closure" to the characters.

Tara Bennett of IGN compared the finale to The Lord of the Rings: The Return of the King (2003), described it as a "feast for the eyes and ears", and called the action sequences in the first half of the episode "tense and effective", Hopper's speech to Eleven as "poignant", and praised music choices, the reunion of the Wheeler children and Joyce dealing Vecna the final blow. She felt the Duffer Brothers "did very right by the whole cast" and felt "particularly happy that the Duffers didn't buy into the series finale bloodbath methodology where swaths of characters have to go down to elicit audience feelings", enjoying that they "stayed true to what counted most in their show - their characters and the deep relationships they forged over five seasons". Bennet lauded Bower's "masterful performance" as Henry, and called Wolfhard's performance "sob-inducing" and "bittersweet". She concluded her review writing, "Stranger Things was a generational event that barreled into a series finale with almost impossible expectations surrounding it. The Duffers certainly evolved into the successful blockbuster directors they so admired in their childhoods, but their enduring legacy will be mostly doing right by a cast of characters who beguiled the globe."

In a mixed review, Alex Zalben of GamesRadar+ gave the episode three-and-a-half stars, writing that "there was no way 'The Rightside Up' could satisfy everyone. In fact, given the over two-hour length of the episode, it ends up hitting every note it possibly can in an effort to please everyone, showing off both the worst and the best of Hawkins". He was critical of the first half of the episode, feeling it was "a shoddily filmed mess that is mostly deadly serious and turns our characters into action heroes far from the Hawkins kids we know and love". Zalben cited Eleven's apparent sacrifice, some of the visuals, and the inclusion of the military subplot as the episode's primary weaknesses, but praised the performance of Bower as Vecna. In contrast, he declared the epilogue as "the best of Stranger Things" and felt that the show is brought full circle in an "emotionally satisfying way".

Similarly, Michael Walsh of Nerdist wrote that "The Rightside Up' got a whole lot right. This final chapter ended this party's campaign with a satisfying farewell. But like the rest of Stranger Things 5, a few bewildering decisions and some weird pacing kept Stranger Things' series finale from true greatness". He noted that "every scene that took place 18 months later was good or even excellent" but felt that the epilogue did feel "tedious" at times, and was frustrated by the military subplot. He praised the visual effects during the final battle against Vecna and the Mind Flayer, and resolution given to each character, writing that "as it did all season, the show delivered on its characters' arcs", particularly lauding the scenes between Eleven and Hopper, and Eleven's farewell to Mike, praising Wolfhard's performance, and felt that Bower delivered his "best performance yet" as Vecna.

=== Audience response ===
Among fans and viewers, immediate reactions were reported to have been polarized. Eleven's fate was described as a "disservice" to the character by some viewers, who also felt that her overall arc in this season reduced her to a plot device and damages her character development in prior seasons. Viewers also criticized plot points that were not fully resolved, including Dr. Kay and the military disappearing from the narrative following Eleven's sacrifice, the absence of the Demogorgons in the Abyss, the unclear fates of certain characters (such as Vickie, Dr. Owens, and Derek's other family members), Max's sudden recovery after being comatose with her limbs broken, and Will being physically unaffected when Vecna and the Mind Flayer are killed. The finale was also criticized for having a lack of stakes compared to those of prior seasons, as no main protagonist is killed off while Vecna and the Mind Flayer are defeated "quite easily", with some viewers feeling it was "unrealistic" and "unfair to the story." Melita D'Souza of The Stanford Daily wrote that the finale felt "incomplete", and opined that certain plot details, particularly those related to Vecna's backstory, required viewers to see the prequel play The First Shadow which "breaks the show's implicit contract with viewers".

After the episode's release, a fan theory dubbed "Conformity Gate" arose to suggest that most of its events were an illusion created by Vecna, and theorized that there would be a secret ninth episode releasing on January 7, 2026. The rumored episode did not materialize, although the influx of curious viewers reportedly caused Netflix to crash. The theory was referenced continuously throughout the January 17, 2026 episode of Saturday Night Live, which was hosted by Wolfhard and featured his fellow series co-stars Caleb McLaughlin and Gaten Matarazzo.

=== Accolades ===
Award	Category	Nominee(s)	Result	Ref.
Cinema Audio Society Awards	Outstanding Achievement in Sound Mixing for a Television Series – One Hour	Michael P. Clark, Mark Paterson, Will Files, Steve Neal, Craig Henighan, Carlos Ramirez, and Judah Getz	Nominated	
Primetime Creative Arts Emmy Awards	Outstanding Music Supervision	Nora Felder	Nominated	
Primetime Creative Arts Emmy Awards	Outstanding Sound Editing for a Comedy or Drama Series (One Hour)	Craig Henighan, William Files, Lee Gilmore, Ryan Cole, Polly McKinnon, Emma Present, Angelo Palazzo, Katie Halliday, Christopher Bonis, Nick Interlandi, Matt "Smokey" Cloud, Gina Wark, Lena Glikson, David Klotz, and Steve Baine	Nominated	
Primetime Creative Arts Emmy Awards	Outstanding Sound Mixing for a Comedy or Drama Series (One Hour)	Mark Paterson, William Files, Steve Neal, Michael P. Clark, Carlos Ramirez, and Peter Persaud	Nominated	
Visual Effects Society Awards	Outstanding Character in an Episodic, Commercial, Game Cinematic, or Real-Time Project	James Moore, Layne Howe, Shawn Warawa, and Yoshihiro Harimoto (for "Mindflayer")	Nominated	
Visual Effects Society Awards	Outstanding Compositing & Lighting in an Episode	Ben Roberts, Rachel E. Herbert, Don Bradford, and Ken Lam (for "The Abyss and Vecna's Face")	Nominated	
Visual Effects Society Awards	Outstanding Effects Simulations in an Episode, Commercial, Game Cinematic, or Real-Time Project	Michael Chrobak, Brandon James Fleet, Yasunobu Arahori, and Hoi Ying Fung (for "Assault on the Mindflayer")	Nominated	
Visual Effects Society Awards	Outstanding Visual Effects in a Photoreal Episode	Betsy Paterson, Tessa Roehl, Michael Maher Jr., and Martin Hill	Nominated	
