= Stranger Things season 5 =

Season of television series

Stranger Things
- Season 5
- Promotional poster
- Showrunners: Matt Duffer; Ross Duffer
- Starring: Winona Ryder; David Harbour; Millie Bobby Brown; Finn Wolfhard; Gaten Matarazzo; Caleb McLaughlin; Noah Schnapp; Sadie Sink; Natalia Dyer; Charlie Heaton; Joe Keery; Maya Hawke; Brett Gelman; Priah Ferguson; Linda Hamilton; Cara Buono; Jamie Campbell Bower; Nell Fisher
- No. of episodes: 8

Release
- Original network: Netflix
- Original release: November 26 – December 31, 2025

Season chronology
- ← Previous; Season 4

The fifth and final season of the American science fiction horror drama television series Stranger Things, marketed as Stranger Things 5, was released on the streaming service Netflix in two volumes and the finale. The first set of four episodes was released on November 26, 2025, the second set of three episodes was released on December 25, and the finale was released on December 31. The season was produced by the show's creators, the Duffer Brothers, along with Shawn Levy and Dan Cohen.

The principal cast for the season includes Winona Ryder, David Harbour, Millie Bobby Brown, Finn Wolfhard, Gaten Matarazzo, Caleb McLaughlin, Noah Schnapp, Sadie Sink, Natalia Dyer, Charlie Heaton, Joe Keery, Maya Hawke, Brett Gelman, Priah Ferguson, Linda Hamilton, Cara Buono, Jamie Campbell Bower, and Nell Fisher, while the recurring cast includes Joe Chrest, Sherman Augustus, Alex Breaux, Jake Connelly, Amybeth McNulty, Randy Havens, and Linnea Berthelsen. The season received mixed reviews from critics, who praised the scale and emotional payoff, while criticism was aimed at the writing and some of the narrative decisions made. It received seven nominations for the 78th Primetime Emmy Awards, winning one (for Outstanding Special Visual Effects).

== Premise ==
Set in November 1987, a year and eight months after the events of the fourth season, the group seeks to find and kill Vecna following the opening of rifts throughout Hawkins. Their mission becomes complicated when the military establishes a quarantine in town and begins hunting Eleven. As the anniversary of Will Byers' disappearance approaches, the group must unite for a final battle against the forces of the Upside Down.

== Cast and characters ==
=== Main ===
- Winona Ryder as Joyce Byers
  - Birdy as young Joyce
- David Harbour as Jim Hopper
- Millie Bobby Brown as Eleven / Jane Hopper
- Finn Wolfhard as Mike Wheeler
  - Max Rackenberg as young Mike
- Gaten Matarazzo as Dustin Henderson
- Caleb McLaughlin as Lucas Sinclair
- Noah Schnapp as Will Byers
  - Luke Kokotek as 12-year-old Will
  - Miles Marthaller as kindergarten-age Will
- Sadie Sink as Max Mayfield
- Natalia Dyer as Nancy Wheeler
- Charlie Heaton as Jonathan Byers
  - Graham Harvey as young Jonathan
- Joe Keery as Steve Harrington
- Maya Hawke as Robin Buckley
- Brett Gelman as Murray Bauman
- Priah Ferguson as Erica Sinclair
- Linda Hamilton as Dr. Kay
- Cara Buono as Karen Wheeler
- Jamie Campbell Bower as Henry Creel / Vecna / One / Mr. Whatsit
  - Raphael Luce as teenage Henry
  - Maksime Blatt as young Henry
- Nell Fisher (Note: Credited under the "also starring" bill for all episodes except "Chapter Eight: The Rightside Up", where she is credited as part of the main cast) as Holly Wheeler

=== Also starring ===
- Sherman Augustus as Lt. Colonel Jack Sullivan
- Emanuel Borria as Sergeant Luis Ramirez
- Alex Breaux as Lt. Robert Akers
- Joe Chrest as Ted Wheeler
- Jake Connelly as Derek Turnbow
- Amybeth McNulty as Vickie Dunne
- Randy Havens as Scott Clarke
- Linnea Berthelsen as Kali Prasad / Eight

=== Recurring ===
- Calista Craig as Mary
- Hope Hynes Love as Miss Harris
- Eden Stephens as Debbie Miller
- Gianlucca Gazzo as Glenn
- Carson Minniear as Thomas
- Anthony B. Jenkins as Joshua
- Birdie Borria as Rebecca
- Alyse Elna Lewis as Wendy

=== Guest ===
- Clayton Royal Johnson as Andy
- Hunter Romanillos as Chance
- Chantell D. Christopher as Doris
- Caroline Elle Abrams as Tina Turnbow
- Gray Hawks as Mr. Turnbow
- Kelly Collins Lintz as Mrs. Turnbow
- Aiden Armstrong as Danny Harrington
- Kyle Riggs as Private Chapman
- Callaway Corrick as Ashley Klein
- Frederick Koehler as a scientist
- Karen Ceesay as Sue Sinclair
- Catherine Curtin as Claudia Henderson
- Arnell Powell as Charles Sinclair
- Sydney Bullock as Stacey
- Tilly Morris as Sara Hopper

== Episodes ==
No. overall	No. in season	Title	Directed by	Written by	Original release date
Volume 1
35	1	"Chapter One: The Crawl"	The Duffer Brothers	The Duffer Brothers	November 26, 2025
While hiding in the Upside Down in 1983, (Note: Between the events of the first season episodes "Chapter Seven: The Bathtub" and "Chapter Eight: The Upside Down" (2016).) Will is caught by a Demogorgon and is brought to Vecna, who infects Will with a tentacle. In 1987, 19 months after the Rifts incident, (Note: As depicted in the fourth season episode "Chapter Nine: The Piggyback" (2022).) a contingent of the US military, led by Dr. Kay and Lt. Robert Akers, have placed Hawkins under quarantine and created a base camp within the Upside Down while still on the hunt for Eleven, who trains in hiding with Hopper and Joyce. Will, Lucas, and Mike lay low, though Dustin provokes the school basketball team by continuing to honor Eddie. Steve, Robin, Jonathan, and Nancy work at WSQK, a local radio station, where they relay coded messages to the group about opportunities to sneak Hopper into the Upside Down, which they call "crawls", to find Vecna's hideout. Dustin is viciously beaten at Eddie's grave, causing him to miss the next crawl, which goes awry when a Demogorgon attacks a military caravan, forcing Hopper to take shelter within the Upside Down. Will telepathically witnesses the attack and sees the Demogorgon head towards the Wheeler residence just as it tears open a gate in the bedroom of Mike and Nancy's younger sister Holly.
36	2	"Chapter Two: The Vanishing of Holly Wheeler"	The Duffer Brothers	The Duffer Brothers	November 26, 2025
The Demogorgon attacks and severely injures Mike and Nancy's parents, Karen and Ted, before disappearing with Holly to the Upside Down. Eleven follows the Demogorgon through a gate into the Upside Down and finds Hopper. The two then search for Holly until they encounter a giant wall surrounding the edge of Hawkins. Jonathan accuses Steve of competing for Nancy's attention before a bloodied Dustin finds them, while Lucas continues tending to a comatose Max in hopes she will wake up. As Karen and Ted remain hospitalized, Nancy and Mike theorize that "Mr. Whatsit", Holly's imaginary friend, may be real and involved in Holly's disappearance. Robin proposes using Will's telepathic link to Vecna's hive mind to track Holly in the Upside Down. Karen informs Nancy and Mike that Mr. Whatsit's first name is Henry, whom they realize is Vecna's human form, Henry Creel. Will discovers that his earlier visions were actually from Henry's point of view as he stalked Holly, realizing he can know Henry's targets before they are taken.
37	3	"Chapter Three: The Turnbow Trap"	Frank Darabont	Caitlin Schneiderhan	November 26, 2025
Henry targets Holly's classmate and bully, Derek Turnbow, as his next victim. Hopper and Eleven fail to break through the massive wall and are ambushed by soldiers, but manage to overpower them. Hopper and Eleven interrogate Akers, concluding that Dr. Kay is holding Henry at the base. Will, Nancy, and Mike inform the group that Henry lured Holly by claiming he was her imaginary friend, prompting them to devise a plan to use Derek as bait to trap the Demogorgon, and implant a tracker in it to reach Holly before more children are taken. The group arms themselves using weapons smuggled in by Murray and enlists Erica to drug Derek and his family. The team splits up, transporting the unconscious family to an abandoned barn while converting Derek's house into a trap for the Demogorgon. The plan unravels when Derek wakes up and Will realizes the Demogorgon has located his group. Meanwhile, Holly finds herself in Henry's childhood home. In the nearby forest, she encounters Max.
38	4	"Chapter Four: Sorcerer"	The Duffer Brothers	Paul Dichter	November 26, 2025
Hopper and Eleven infiltrate the military base, intending to kill Henry. They defeat Dr. Kay and her soldiers, discovering that the captive inside is Eleven's adoptive sister, Kali. Max explains to Holly that they are trapped inside a psychic realm made of Henry's memories, nicknamed "Camazotz" by Holly, where Max has remained ever since her brief death. Will's group is attacked by a Demogorgon until Dustin, Steve, Nancy, and Jonathan chase it into the Upside Down. Meanwhile, the military detains children in Hawkins who could be potential victims. Will experiences a vision of Holly and three other children being restrained by tentacles in Vecna's lair, with empty spots for eight more. Will's group infiltrates the base to smuggle the children out of Hawkins. However, Henry, in his Vecna form, and three Demogorgons emerge from the Upside Down, slaughter most of the soldiers at the Hawkins base, and kidnap Henry's targets, including Derek. Before retreating into the Upside Down, Henry tells Will that he intends to use the children, whom he calls "perfect vessels", to reshape the world. Will then unlocks psychic abilities and kills the Demogorgons to save Mike, Lucas, and Robin.
Volume 2
39	5	"Chapter Five: Shock Jock"	Frank Darabont	Curtis Gwinn	December 25, 2025
In Camazotz, the kidnapped children awaken, and while most believe Henry's claim that he saved them, Holly and Derek do not. Max and Holly traverse Henry's memories of Holly to search for an escape as Derek distracts him. Henry discovers the plan, threatens Derek's family, turns into Vecna, finds Holly, and strangles Max. Will's group reanimates a dead Demogorgon using the radio tower's voltage so Will can reconnect to the hive mind and kill Vecna. Will possesses Vecna's body, breaking his leg and speaking through him to tell Max and Holly to run; Henry expels him from his mind soon after, causing Will to pass out. In the Upside Down, Hopper and Eleven escape the military base with Kali, who reveals Dr. Kay was using her blood, just as Dr. Brenner used Henry's blood, in failed experiments to give children powers. At Hawkins Lab, Dustin theorizes that the wall surrounding the Upside Down is a protective shield that, if destroyed, can weaken Henry. Nancy and Jonathan find a mysterious sphere on the roof of the lab. Dustin finds Brenner's journal and realizes he is wrong, but fails to warn the others before Nancy shoots the sphere.
40	6	"Chapter Six: Escape from Camazotz"	Shawn Levy	Kate Trefry	December 25, 2025
Dustin explains to Steve that the Upside Down is not an alternate dimension but a wormhole to another realm, held together by a mass of "exotic matter", which they realize is the sphere on the roof. The exotic matter detonates upon being shot, causing the building to begin melting; Nancy and Jonathan become trapped in a collapsing room. Believing they will die, they end their relationship on good terms; the melting eventually halts. Max and Holly find a memory of a young Henry killing a man in self-defense in a cave. Erica and Murray recruit Mr. Clarke to help locate Dustin's group. Henry uses the unconscious Will to track Max in the real world and sends Demodogs to kill her at the hospital. Hopper, Eleven, and Kali reunite with the others in Hawkins, and Eleven frees Will. At the hospital, Lucas, Robin, and her girlfriend Vickie protect Max from the Demodogs, with Karen ultimately saving them by detonating a laundry machine to kill the creatures. Seeing her exit from Vecna's mind formed via Lucas's music, Max tells Holly she needs to find her own way out and reminds her of her past bravery, allowing both to escape separately.
41	7	"Chapter Seven: The Bridge"	The Duffer Brothers and Shawn Levy	The Duffer Brothers	December 25, 2025
Max awakens safely in the real world, while Holly awakens inside Vecna's lair and escapes through a gate, falling through the Upside Down before being pulled back by Vecna. Erica, Murray, and Mr. Clarke map Dustin's location in the Upside Down to the lab, and Eleven opens a rift so the group can reunite. Dustin deduces that the Upside Down was created when Brenner forced Eleven to contact Henry, and now serves as a bridge to a separate realm, "the Abyss", which Henry plans to merge with their world, likely that night. The group decides to let Henry draw the worlds close enough to climb the WSQK radio tower into the Abyss, rescue the children, and then destroy the Upside Down by detonating a time bomb near the exotic matter to stop the worlds from merging. Max volunteers to guide Eleven through Henry’s mind, and Kali insists on joining. Will comes out as gay to the group, reasoning that confronting his fears weakens Vecna's hold. Henry manipulates the kidnapped children into turning against Holly; she is forced to join hands with the children and Henry, who puts them in a trance.
Finale
42	8	"Chapter Eight: The Rightside Up"	The Duffer Brothers	The Duffer Brothers	December 31, 2025
As the others make their way to the Abyss, Eleven, Kali, and Max enter Henry's mind and stop him from merging the worlds, but he transforms into Vecna, escapes, and tricks Hopper into breaking the link. Akers' forces assault the lab and kill Kali; Eleven kills them in return. Holly leads the other children out of Henry's mind while Eleven enters the Abyss to fight Henry. Will witnesses Henry's past and learns he was corrupted by a fragment of the Mind Flayer, which he fully embraces despite Will's pleas. The Mind Flayer rises as a giant kaiju, which the group kills while Eleven and Will overpower Henry. The group rescues the children, and Joyce decapitates a dying Henry. Upon returning to Hawkins and detonating the bomb they placed in the Upside Down, the group is arrested by Dr. Kay, but is then released when Eleven chooses to stay behind in the collapsing Upside Down. 18 months later, life returns to normal; the young adults reunite, Hopper proposes to Joyce, and the party graduates and finishes a Dungeons & Dragons campaign. Mike imagines their futures and theorizes how Eleven may still be alive, with the others choosing to believe him.

== Production ==
=== Development ===
On February 17, 2022, Stranger Things creators Matt and Ross Duffer released an expansive letter that included, amongst other revelations, the fourth season's two-part release schedule, their intention to produce a spinoff series set in the world of the show for Netflix, and the renewal of the series for a fifth and final season. The duo had originally indicated the show was planned to run for a maximum four seasons, but a five-season run was later teased by producers in 2017.

As with seasons past, planning for the fifth and final season of Stranger Things began before the preceding season's release. However, due to disruptions caused by the COVID-19 pandemic, the Duffers were able to completely outline the fifth season before the fourth had even begun shooting, which was a departure from their usual development cadence. They then revisited their outline and reworked the structure and events of season five based on feedback they received after the release of season four, even going so far as to alter the series' ending. In June 2023, it was announced that Dan Trachtenberg had been hired to direct an episode of the season. Executive producer Shawn Levy was confirmed to be directing at least one episode in the season by September 2023. However, after the movie Predator: Badlands (2025) was greenlit, Trachtenberg became unable to direct his episode, so it was directed instead by Frank Darabont. Darabont came out of retirement to direct two episodes, having been a huge fan of the series alongside his wife.

=== Writing ===
Writing for the fifth season began on August 2, 2022, about a month after the release of the fourth season's second volume. On November 6, 2022 (Stranger Things Day), it was announced that the first episode would be titled "Chapter One: The Crawl" and would be written by the Duffers. As noted by the Duffers in the WGFestival 2022, some unused ideas originally conceived for the second season were implemented in the fifth season's storylines. Because of the COVID-19 pandemic's effects on the entertainment industry, the Duffers had time to outline the fifth season before even the fourth season could be shot, edited and released, but once the fourth season was released, the Duffers received some feedback from both the fans and collaborators of the show, leading them to re-write some plans for the season, namely the series finale, and pitch them to Netflix, though they noted that most of their original plan stayed unchanged. The writers team described the tone of the season as if "season 1 and 4 had a baby" which was "injected with steroids". On May 6, 2023, the Duffers announced that writing for the season had been paused due to the 2023 Writers Guild of America strike. On September 27, the day the strike ended, the Twitter account of the Stranger Things writers' room posted an image stating "We're back", confirming that writing had resumed. Netflix reportedly would prioritize writing this script because Stranger Things was profitable and because the actors, though still young, could not continue to portray teenagers forever. On October 14, 2023, it was revealed that writing was over halfway done. The Duffer Brothers mentioned the ease of writing the split in parts of the season as opposed to the split that was "necessitated" in the fourth season due to the COVID-19 pandemic.

The table read for episode 4 occurred on December 6, 2023, and the final table read occurred on September 8, 2024, in Stage 16 of the Atlanta production facilities used in previous Stranger Things seasons. It was attended by the Duffer Brothers, Levy, and the cast members. By this time, the actors had not read the script up to the finale since the Duffer brothers generally do not share their work with the cast. In August 2025, Ross mentioned that the first episode is the most "eventful" of the entire series along with the series premiere, and that the second has the "craziest cold open" they have done. With Variety, Matt revealed that we would see Mike Wheeler "became the leader again" but in a more "confident" and "mature" version than the one from the first season. The season will reveal the truth and what the Upside Down really is. It will also mark the end of the main characters' stories, with the finale wrapping up their stories, Vecna, and the creatures of the Upside Down (Demogorgons, the Mind Flayer, and Demobats). The military gains weight in the season establishing a military quarantine to try to cover the "portal disaster" and assigning a team, known as "The Wolf Pack" and led by Dr. Kay (Linda Hamilton), to capture Eleven. Eleven now "has better control over her powers" and uses them "in more innovative ways", with Matt saying that the most accurate example would be "probably the Force". Finn Wolfhard said that one of the concerns was the finale would have a negative reception like the one of Game of Thrones (2011–2019), but when they read the script for the episode they knew that "it was something special", The Duffers mentioned that Vecna is now "stronger and scarier than ever" like "Freddy [Krueger] on steroids" with, for example, his powers now being "effective" in the real world and not only in the Upside Down. Ross Duffer mentioned that Dustin Henderson is grieving and "struggling" over what happened to Eddie Munson, which will put "challenges" on his relationship with Steve Harrington and how it will be "destabilizing" that he will not be, as he has been in previous seasons, the one who keeps the group "together and keep everyone aligned". The Duffers mention that this season reveals what the Upside Down really is and why Vecna took Will Byers in the first season. Will is a central character of the season for the story to "go full circle" and explore his "connection and relationship" with Vecna. For Vecna, they drew inspiration from the "bad guys" in The Terminator (1984) and Terminator 2: Judgment Day (1991), as well as Darth Vader's entrance in the Star Wars film Rogue One (2016) to showcase "his powers in full display".

The Duffers discussed Will's powers, a decision they had been considering for some time. They mentioned that his powers are not like Vecna's or Eleven's; he can only control what is inside Vecna's and the Upside Down's hive mind, with Ross mentioning that his power source comes from Vecna, and it's as if he's "puppeteering" it. Noah Schnapp mentioned that he feels that the relationship between Will and Vecna are similar to the one Harry Potter and Lord Voldemort have in the Harry Potter franchise, and that more of those parallels would be shown throughout the season. The events of the prequel play Stranger Things: The First Shadow (2023) hint that that the Mind Flayer was the one who made Henry accept his dark side and connection to the Upside Down. Therefore, Matt hinted that the finale would reveal who "the real evil is": Vecna or the Mind Flayer. Ross Duffer said they never intended the ending of Eleven to be with her staying with Mike and the rest of her friends, as it was necessary for her to "go away" so the group could "move on" and to close the story of Hawkins and the Upside Down.

=== Casting ===
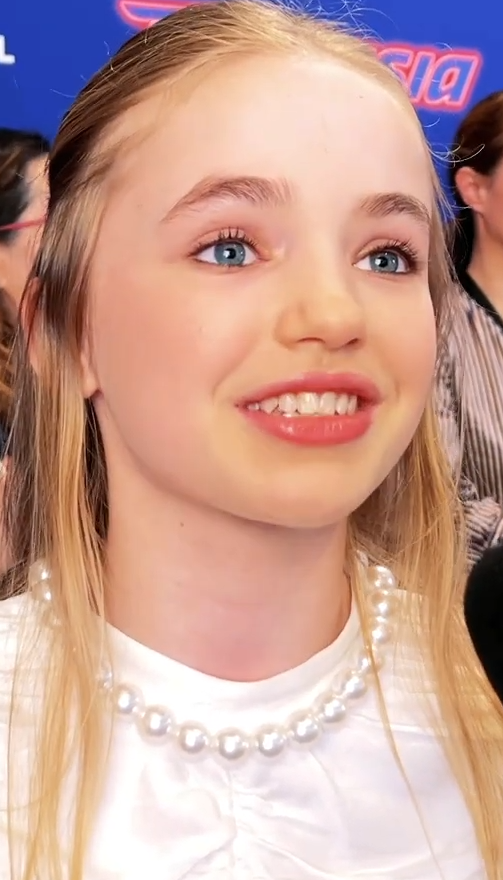
Nell Fisher was cast in the role of Holly Wheeler.

The fifth season features the return of Winona Ryder, David Harbour, Finn Wolfhard, Millie Bobby Brown, Gaten Matarazzo, Caleb McLaughlin, Noah Schnapp, Sadie Sink, Natalia Dyer, Charlie Heaton, Joe Keery, Maya Hawke, Priah Ferguson, Brett Gelman, Cara Buono, and Jamie Campbell Bower. When production began in January 2024, a set photo released by the team confirmed the return of Amybeth McNulty as Vickie. That same month, Eduardo Franco, who had a starring role as Argyle in the previous season, stated that he was not involved and that Argyle would not return.

In June 2023, during Netflix's Tudum event, it was announced that Linda Hamilton would be joining the cast. Hamilton had contacted the Duffers through Zoom, with them providing her information about the "shape" of her character, but not the story. In July 2024, Nell Fisher, Jake Connelly, and Alex Breaux were revealed to have joined the cast in undisclosed roles. Amidst filming in mid-October 2024, a casting call was announced by Knight Edge Media for Jim Hopper's late daughter Sara, who was previously portrayed by Elle Graham in the first season, with indications she would similarly feature in flashback sequences with a requirement of the chosen actress to resemble Graham back then. Fisher was later confirmed to appear as Holly Wheeler, who was previously played by twin actresses Anniston and Tinsley Price in the first four seasons.

The role of Mrs. Harris was written for Hope Hynes Love, who was the high school drama teacher of the Duffers. The season marked the return of Linnea Berthelsen as Kali Prasad / Eight, who last appeared in the second season. The Duffers talked about including her in each season, but not "just putting her in, to put her in", and found the right moment on this one. They mention that she will have a "big impact on Eleven's journey", with Brown mentioning that it impacts Eleven's life because she does not have "much family in her life" or many people who understand her as Kali does.

=== Filming ===
Harbour originally expected to shoot his scenes as Jim Hopper for the season concurrently with those of his character Alexei Shostakov / Red Guardian for the Marvel Cinematic Universe (MCU) film Thunderbolts* (2025), which was originally planned to be shot at the same time as the season in Atlanta. However, the 2023 Hollywood labor disputes caused both productions to be delayed. Because of this, the Duffers' initial agreement with Ryder upon joining the show back in mid-2015, that of letting her take a break from the series to reprise her role as Lydia Deetz in a possible Beetlejuice (1988) sequel that Tim Burton had been seriously planning since 2000, did not need to be granted as Ryder shot Beetlejuice Beetlejuice (2024) amid the disputes before filming on the season began.

After a significant delay due to the disputes, production of the fifth season began on January 8, 2024. By March 2024, Brown stated that there had been nine months left of filming and that she had then read the script for six episodes. On June 27, Hawke revealed on the "Podcrushed" podcast that the season will consist of "basically eight movies", and that the episodes are "very long". On July 3, Ross Duffer revealed that production was halfway done. In October 2024, Wolfhard stated to People that they were "almost done shooting". Filming wrapped on December 20, 2024. The last shot recorded on set was a lunchbox that "didn't include any of the cast". The Duffer brothers, despite the scheduling and time constraints that could have arisen, managed "to structure it" so every actor's last day was really their last scene. Keery revealed that everyone felt some "fatigue" after filming for a year, material which he describes as "incredible". Certain actors, such as Nell Fisher, had also filmed scenes from the finale before the table read. Filming lasted 237 days, with the main unit capturing 630 hours of footage.

The Duffers revealed that they have been able to try new methods of filming for this season, such as first-person shots of the Demogorgon, the "demo-vision".

=== Post-production ===
In January 2025, the Duffers announced that post-production for the season was underway and that work on the visual effects was "ahead of schedule". In October, the Duffers revealed that the editing process of the season was already complete.

In October, it was reported that each episode had cost $50–60 million, with the season as a whole reaching a budget of $400–480 million, making it one of the most expensive television productions.

=== Music ===
The original soundtrack album for the fifth season was released on January 1, 2026, via Lakeshore and Invada Records, while the non-original soundtrack companion was released via Legacy Recordings in three parts, corresponding to the release of each of the season's three segments. An EP consisting of five themes from the series in orchestral arrangements by Dan Romer and Rob Simonsen was released on February 6, 2026.

== Marketing ==
In January 2025, a missing person poster for Eleven (displayed as Jane Hopper) was released. New footage from the season was released on May 31, during the celebration of Tudum alongside the release dates. On July 15, the first promotional poster was released.

A teaser trailer was released on July 16, featuring the song "Child in Time" by Deep Purple. Aya Tsintziras of Game Rant praised the emotional charge between the characters in the teaser. One of the most talked about aspects of the teaser was Vecna's redesign, which had a "thinner" and "spinier" appearance.

The official trailer was released on October 30, featuring the song "Who Wants to Live Forever" by Queen. The trailer was accidentally posted hours earlier by Netflix. On November 6, during a virtual watch party, Netflix released the five minute opening sequence to "Chapter One: The Crawl". Early that month, Levy took a short break from filming Star Wars: Starfighter (2027) to be able to promote the season due to the show's 10th anniversary being a special occasion for him.

The series had a collaboration with the video game Dead by Daylight for a second time through "Stranger Things Chapter 2", released on January 27, 2026, introducing as playable characters Eleven, Dustin Henderson, Robin Buckley and Eddie Munson as Survivors and Vecna as a Killer.

== Release ==
The season had its premiere at the TCL Chinese Theater on November 6, 2025, which is Stranger Things Day, and was released on the streaming platform Netflix in three segments: the first volume with four episodes was released on November 26, the second volume with three episodes was released four weeks later on December 25, and the series finale was released six days later on December 31. For the season premiere, Netflix's bandwidth was increased by 30% to prevent slow performance, but the site crashed shortly after the premiere. Upon the first volume's release, the second episode initially remained titled "Chapter Two: The Vanishing of..." on Netflix's season page, but was titled "Chapter Two: The Vanishing of Holly Wheeler" in its opening credits. Netflix again crashed shortly after the finale aired.

The series finale had a limited theatrical release in the United States and Canada with showtimes beginning the evening of December 31, 2025, and continuing through January 1, 2026. It was previously reported that the finale would not be released in theaters. However, it was reported that the plan to release the finale in theaters had been "in the works for some time", with Ross Duffer stating that it had been in the works for a year. The finale was screened at 620 theaters with pre-sales of 1.1 million tickets, which were sold as concession vouchers rather than traditional admissions due to issues with the cast's residuals contracts. The theatrical release generated over $25 million in concession income.

== Documentary ==
A behind-the-scenes documentary, titled One Last Adventure: The Making of Stranger Things 5, was released on Netflix on January 12, 2026.

== Reception ==
On Rotten Tomatoes, the fifth season has an approval rating of 82% based on 162 reviews, with an average rating of 7.2/10. The website's critics consensus states, "Stranger Things plays its cards just right in Season 5, solidifying its pop culture classic status with genuinely captivating genre fare." Metacritic, which uses a weighted average, gave a score of 71 out of 100 based on 32 critics, indicating "generally favorable" reviews.

The first volume received critical praise for its entertainment, humor, and emotional payoff, though there was criticism for its plot, length, and lack of maturity. Jake Seale of The Guardian gave it four stars out of five. Leila Latif of Empire gave it a 4/5 rating, praising its emotional depth and scale. Ben Travers of IndieWire gave it a C+ grade. The second volume and the finale were met with more polarizing reviews, with criticism aimed at several writing and narrative decisions. Michael Walsh of Nerdist gave it a 4/5 rating, highlighting its ambition and emotional payoff while noting pacing issues. Ed Potton of The Times gave it four stars out of five, calling it the "crown jewel" of the show but noting that the plot became "increasingly preposterous." Stuart Heritage of The Guardian gave it three stars out of five. Kelly Lawler of USA Today gave the season overall two and a half stars, saying that it "seesaw[ed] between thrilling and annoying, from emotionally satisfying to logically baffling." Tara Bennett of IGN praised the finale as an emotional and highly satisfying conclusion, highlighting its scale and resolution of the storylines. Travers ended his review of the finale by saying, "In order to survive, the Duffers soon resolved their nostalgia-fest had to be bigger than it was bold. It didn't always work out, but it works well enough for an ending that encourages everyone to accept saying goodbye to the things they once loved."

The seventh episode, "Chapter Seven: The Bridge", was reported by media outlets to be review bombed on several sites due to a lengthy scene of the character Will Byers coming out as gay, and issues from some fans with the writing, plot, or performances. Following the finale, a fan theory dubbed "Conformity Gate" posited that a secret ninth episode would be released on January 7, 2026, alleging that numerous aspects of the finale hinted towards its existence. The rumored episode did not materialize, although the influx of curious viewers reportedly caused Netflix to crash. Netflix did not address the theory but stated on its Stranger Things social media accounts that no further episodes would be released.

=== Accolades ===
Year	Award	Category	Nominee(s)	Result	Ref.
2025	AACTA Awards	Favourite TV Show	Stranger Things	Won	
2025	Astra Creative Arts Awards	Best Cinematography	Stranger Things	Nominated	
2025	Astra Creative Arts Awards	Best Costume Design	Stranger Things	Nominated	
2025	Astra Creative Arts Awards	Best Editing	Stranger Things	Nominated	
2025	Astra Creative Arts Awards	Best Ensemble Cast	Stranger Things	Nominated	
2025	Astra Creative Arts Awards	Best Hair Styling	Stranger Things	Nominated	
2025	Astra Creative Arts Awards	Best Makeup	Stranger Things	Nominated	
2025	Astra Creative Arts Awards	Best Original Score	Stranger Things	Won	
2025	Astra Creative Arts Awards	Best Original Song	Stranger Things	Nominated	
2025	Astra Creative Arts Awards	Best Production Design	Stranger Things	Nominated	
2025	Astra Creative Arts Awards	Best Visual Effects	Stranger Things	Won	
2025	Digital Spy Reader Awards	Best TV Character	Dustin Henderson (Gaten Matarazzo)	Won	
2025	Digital Spy Reader Awards	Best TV Show (Worldwide)	Stranger Things	Won	
2025	Digital Spy Reader Awards	Most Wanted Axed Show to Return	Stranger Things	Won	
2025	Golden Tomato Awards	Best Horror Series of 2025	Stranger Things	Nominated	
2026	Actor Awards	Outstanding Stunt Ensemble in a Television Series	Stranger Things	Nominated	
2026	Art Directors Guild Awards	Excellence in Production Design — One-Hour Fantasy Single-Camera Series	Stranger Things	Nominated	
2026	Cinema Audio Society Awards	Outstanding Achievement in Sound Mixing for Television Series – One Hour – "Chapter Eight: The Rightside Up"	Michael P. Clark · Mark Paterson · Will Files · Steve Neal · Craig Henighan · Carlos Remirez · Judah Getz	Nominated	
2026	Family Film & TV Awards	Favorite Ensemble Television Series	Stranger Things	Nominated	
2026	GLAAD Media Awards	Outstanding Drama Series	Stranger Things	Won	
2026	Golden Reel Awards	Outstanding Achievement in Music Editing – Broadcast Long Form – "Chapter Four: Sorcerer"	David Klotz · Lena Glikson	Nominated	
2026	Golden Reel Awards	Outstanding Achievement in Sound Editing – Broadcast Long Form Dialogue/ADR – "Chapter Four: Sorcerer"	Craig Henighan · Will Files · Ryan Cole · Polly McKinnon · Korey Pereira · Graham Terry · Emma Present	Nominated	
2026	Golden Reel Awards	Outstanding Achievement in Sound Editing – Broadcast Long Form Effects/Foley – "Chapter Four: Sorcerer"	Will Files · Craig Henighan · Angelo Palazzo · David Grimaldi · Katie Halliday · Nolan McNaughton · Christopher Bonis · Nicholas Interlandi · Steve Neal · Matt "Smokey" Cloud · Lee Gilmore · Gina Wark · Peter Persaud · Steve Baine	Nominated	
2026	Guild of Music Supervisors Awards	Best Music Supervision in a Trailer – Series	Bobby Gumm	Nominated	
2026	ICG Publicists Awards	Maxwell Weinberg Award for Television Publicity Campaign	Stranger Things	Nominated	
2026	Make-Up Artists and Hair Stylists Guild Awards	Best Period and/or Character Hair Styling	Sarah Hindsgaul · Katrina Suhre · Brynn Berg · Dena Gibson · Lanzel Smith Jr	Nominated	
2026	Make-Up Artists and Hair Stylists Guild Awards	Best Period and/or Character Makeup	Eryn Krueger Mekash · Devin Morales · Mike Mekash · Jessica Gambardella · Benji Dove	Nominated	
2026	Make-Up Artists and Hair Stylists Guild Awards	Best Special Effects Makeup	Barrie Gower · Mike Mekash · Duncan Jarman	Won	
2026	NAACP Image Awards	Outstanding Supporting Actor in a Drama Series	Caleb McLaughlin	Won	
2026	Satellite Awards	Best Genre Series	Stranger Things	Nominated	
2026	Saturn Awards	Best Actress on a Television Series	Millie Bobby Brown	Nominated	
2026	Saturn Awards	Best Fantasy Series	Stranger Things	Nominated	
2026	Saturn Awards	Best Guest Star on a Television Series	Linda Hamilton	Nominated	
2026	Saturn Awards	Best Young Performer on a Television Series	Noah Schnapp	Nominated	
2026	Saturn Awards	Best Young Performer on a Television Series	Sadie Sink	Nominated	
2026	Visual Effects Society Awards	Outstanding Character in an Episodic Project – Mind Flayer in "Chapter Eight: The Rightside Up"	James Moore · Layne Howe · Shawn Warawa · Yoshihiro Harimoto	Nominated	
2026	Visual Effects Society Awards	Outstanding Compositing & Lighting in an Episode – "Chapter Eight: The Rightside Up"; The Abyss and Vecna's Face	Ben Roberts · Rachel E. Herbert · Don Bradford · Ken Lam	Nominated	
2026	Visual Effects Society Awards	Outstanding Effects Simulations in an Episode – "Chapter Eight: The Rightside Up"; Assault on the Mind Flayer	Michael Chrobak · Brandon James Fleet · Yasunobu Arahori · Hoi Ying Fung	Nominated	
2026	Visual Effects Society Awards	Outstanding Visual Effects in a Photoreal Episode – "Chapter Eight: The Rightside Up"	Betsy Paterson · Tessa Roehl · Michael Maher Jr. · Martin Hill	Nominated	
