= Hope Hynes Love =

American actress and theatre educator

- Occupations: Actress; theatre educator; director
- Years active: 2025–present

Hope Hynes Love is an American actress, theatre educator, and director based in North Carolina. She is a National Board Certified theatre teacher with decades of experience in secondary-school theatre, and she made her television debut as Miss Harris in the fifth season of the Netflix series Stranger Things (2025).

== Career ==
=== Theatre and education ===
Love has led high school theatre programs in the Durham–Chapel Hill area, including serving as artistic director at Charles E. Jordan High School and later at East Chapel Hill High School. Former students Matt and Ross Duffer have credited her drama teaching with helping inspire their later work on Stranger Things.

Outside the classroom, she has acted and directed for several Triangle-area companies, including Burning Coal Theatre, Deep Dish Theater and Little Green Pig Theatrical Concern. Her directing credits include productions such as Jonathan Spector's Eureka Day and other contemporary plays for regional companies.

Love is also an expert facilitator of Liz Lerman's Critical Response Process, which she has integrated into rehearsal and season-planning work with her students.

=== Stranger Things ===
In 2025, Love appeared as Miss Harris in the fifth and final season of Stranger Things, playing the elementary-school teacher of Holly Wheeler, Mike and Nancy Wheeler's younger sister. The role was written for her by the Duffer Brothers, who publicly described the casting as a tribute to their former drama teacher and used the announcement to highlight the importance of arts education.

== Filmography ==
=== Television ===
| Year | Title | Role | Notes |
|---|---|---|---|
| 2025 | Stranger Things | Miss Harris | 3 episodes |
