= Vecna (Stranger Things) =

Stranger Things antagonist

- Stranger Things character
- Jamie Campbell Bower as Vecna in the fifth season
- First appearance: "Chapter One: The Hellfire Club" (2022)
- Last appearance: "Chapter Eight: The Rightside Up" (2025)
- Created by: The Duffer Brothers
- Portrayed by: Television: Jamie Campbell Bower Raphael Luce (young) Maksime Blatt (young); Play: Louis McCartney
- Voiced by: Jamie Campbell Bower (Stranger Things VR) Andrew Morgado (Dead by Daylight) Harley Yeager (Dead by Daylight)

In-universe information
- Full name: Henry Creel
- Aliases: 001 (subject name); Mr. Whatsit; Peter Ballard (Ordinary); Vecna
- Gender: Male
- Family: Victor Creel (father); Virginia Creel (mother; deceased); Alice Creel (sister; deceased)
- Abilities: Telekinesis; Telepathy

Henry Creel, commonly known as Vecna and also as One or Mr. Whatsit, is a fictional character and the main antagonist of the Netflix science fiction horror television series Stranger Things. He is portrayed by Jamie Campbell Bower. The character was introduced in the fourth season as a malevolent being from the Upside Down, a wormhole connecting Earth to The Abyss, initially classified as a mirroring alternate dimension, that haunts his victims with horrifying visions of their past traumas before killing them in a sadistic, brutal manner. As the fourth season progresses, he is ultimately revealed to be the alpha of the Upside Down and the mastermind behind all of the events that previously terrorized the town of Hawkins, beginning with the disappearance of Will Byers, revealing himself to be a vengeful misanthrope bent on bringing on human extinction, by aiding the Mind Flayer in its goals.

Since his first appearance, the character has been well received by critics and audiences, with strong praise for the character's backstory, makeup design, and Bower's performance. For his performance, Bower received a nomination for the Best Villain in a Series award at the Critics' Choice Super Awards. The character is portrayed by Louis McCartney in the prequel play Stranger Things: The First Shadow, which explores Henry's backstory prior to the events of the series.

== Concept and development ==
Vecna is loosely based on the Dungeons & Dragons character of the same name, similar to how other antagonists are borrowed from the game such as the Demogorgons and Mind Flayer. Bower was cast on November 20, 2020, under the original name of "Peter Ballard,” a friendly orderly at a psychiatric hospital. In a 2022 interview with Entertainment Weekly, Bower said this about his role:

"I have no idea where the name Peter Ballard came from. I can only apologize to fans of the show for being part of such a massive red herring. I remember seeing it and being like, 'Okay, guys. Cheers! That's going to be a tough one if anybody asks me, but I'll just go with the party line."

The Duffer Brothers have stated that they have planned to introduce Vecna since the development of the first season. They were offered the chance to introduce the character in spin-off comics or books, but they refused as they needed time to develop the character and figure out what role he would play in the series. For the creation of the character, the brothers were inspired by iconic villains such as Pinhead, Pennywise and Freddy Krueger. This was with the intention of creating a meaner, darker, and more menacing villain for the show, having the ability to traumatize its victims before killing them in a horrifying way by breaking their bones and gouging their eyes out.

Jamie Campbell Bower said that among influences on his performance and character he used Pinhead from Hellraiser franchise, Christopher Lee's Dracula, Gary Oldman's Dracula, his other references also include The Shining (1980), Funny Games (1997), Dark City (1998), Alone (2020).

=== Suit design ===
Make-up artist Barrie Gower provided the look for Vecna and other Upside Down creatures. Bower had to wear a prosthetic suit for over 7–10 hours every filming session. The suit was designed with "anemic" skin whose integration with the toxic environment of the Upside Down was apparent through the inclusion of "lot of roots and vines and very organic shapes and fibrous muscle tissue." To achieve this look using mostly practical effects, Gower disclosed that he and his team took a full body cast of Bower, to later sculpt to meet their design needs:

"We started off with his life cast, and to make sure everything was going to be super skin-tight, we reduced the life cast by a certain percentage all over, so once we had a plaster form of his entire body, our guys here started modeling the body in all shapes and forms in the Plasticine, which took several weeks to do that. From that, we split the body up into various sections... I think it was about 18 pieces in total, and they all went on to their own respective formers made out of either fiberglass or epoxy resin. And then we made molds of all the separate Plasticine pieces and then once we had these molds, we were able to create prosthetic appliances, and we've done them in a mixture of materials."

== Fictional character biography ==
=== Early life ===
==== Life in Nevada ====
Henry Creel was born in Nevada in 1947 to Victor, a World War II veteran, and Virginia Creel. He also had a older sister, Alice. Throughout his childhood, Henry was treated as an outcast, and the majority of his cohorts considered him "broken" beyond repair. Henry felt misunderstood and separated from his family.

At some point, Henry visited a mineshaft in some caves near Rachel, Nevada, where he encountered a scientist who shot him in the hand despite his asking if he needed help before Henry bludgeoned the man with a rock. Opening a case in the scientist's possession, Henry touched a stone made of the Mind Flayer's particles. Henry was transported to, or contacted from, another dimension where the Mind Flayer entity told him to "find me" and infected the young boy through his hand wound. The scientist tried to warn Henry to resist the Mind Flayer, or it would consume all, but Henry killed him with his newfound powers. This memory would subsequently be blocked by the Mind Flayer to keep Henry from discovering the truth, manifesting as a cave in his mind that the adult Henry was too afraid to enter.

==== Life in Hawkins ====
The family moved to Hawkins, Indiana, in 1959 after Virginia's great-uncle died, leaving a small fortune that allowed them to buy a new house. Henry discovered black widow spiders in the attic and became fascinated with them. He realized he could enter the minds of animals with his psychic abilities.

Though Henry struggled to make friends upon joining Hawkins High School, he quickly formed a connection with Patty Newby, daughter of the school principal. Patty convinced Henry that his powers were not evil, and that he should be able to control them and use them for good. They began a romantic relationship shortly after being cast in the school's production of Dark of the Moon, directed by Joyce Maldonado. During this time, Henry was overcome by the influence of the Mind Flayer – his mind entered what he called "the battlefield", from where he proceeded to kill several animals, including Claudia Yount's cat Prancer. Henry became haunted by visions of the Mind Flayer and was terrified that he would be made to kill Patty. As Henry practiced using his powers more and more, he gave his family terrifying visions and nightmares. His father was convinced the house was haunted, but his mother discovered it was Henry's doing.

Patty convinced Henry to use his powers to track down her biological mother. As he did this, and while inside the void, he lost control and was once again visited by the monster. This frightened Patty, and when her father walked in, he was attacked and almost killed (by Henry controlled by the presence). Patty was able to encourage Henry to fight back and the two declared their love for each other, enabling Henry to end the situation, but not before Patty's father was blinded and seriously injured. Mr. Newby was sent to the hospital, and Virginia sent Henry to Dr. Martin Brenner. Virginia was supplied with drugs by Brenner; under the influence of these drugs, she told Brenner everything about her son.

Brenner took Henry to Hawkins National Laboratory, where Brenner revealed that the man Henry met in the cave was one of his scientists who defected and became a spy for the Soviet Union, and Brenner had tracked Henry down via the spyglass that he dropped in the cave that day. Henry, using a sensory deprivation chamber, showed Brenner a Demogorgon through the Void, but resisted Brenner's orders to kill a prisoner. Realizing Henry was devoted to Patty and therefore could not kill, Brenner decided to kill Patty.

Henry returned home, but sensed that his family was not happy about his return. Using his powers, he read his mother's thoughts and understood that she wants to send him back to Brenner. Henry gave in to the Mind Flayer's influence; while possessed, he killed Virginia and Alice before he and Victor both fell unconscious. Awakening in dazed confusion hours later, Henry rushed to the school to save Patty from Brenner. Atop the stage rafters, Henry reunited with Patty only to be interrupted by Brenner. As Henry struggled for control, he informed Patty that he found her birth mother, a singer at the Stardust Casino in Las Vegas. The Mind Flayer once again took control of Henry, and Henry threw Patty off the rafters, but she survived her injuries as he regained enough control to slow her fall. Brenner took Henry back to Hawkins Lab and arranged for him to be publicly declared dead. Victor was subsequently blamed for the deaths.

At Hawkins National Lab, Henry became Brenner's first test subject and was given the name of Subject 001 "One". After numerous attempts to keep Henry under control, Brenner implanted a chip in his neck to suppress his powers, and transfused Henry's blood into pregnant women so that their babies could have Henry's abilities. Henry became an orderly and assisted Dr. Brenner in his experiments, where he met Subject 011 ("Eleven").

=== Subject 001 "One" and becoming Vecna ===
Over time, One oversaw the activities and progress of seventeen children with psychic abilities, though none appeared as powerful as he was. He took a liking to and befriended Eleven. After witnessing Eleven being bullied by the other subjects, One believed they were alike and sensed that the world would never understand them. One helped Eleven hone her powers and later offered her a chance to escape the lab. One gave Eleven a key card and instructed her to meet him in the basement. There, after explaining that a chip in his neck prevented him from leaving, Eleven removed it and learned that One was Henry. Upon being caught by the guards, One dispatched them and told Eleven to wait for him in a closet. One would then massacre everyone in the facility, with the exception of Brenner. After explaining his origins and crimes to a horrified young Eleven, she rejected his offer to join forces with him in order to take over the world. Thanks to the positive memories of her mother, she ultimately overpowered One and banished him to an alien parallel dimension, later named “The Abyss” (or “Dimension X”), where the hostile environment transformed him into a mutilated, burned creature, later dubbed "Vecna". Over the next four years, Vecna gained control over the dimension's lifeforms through a shared hive mind. Central to this control was his connection to a powerful entity, later called the Mind Flayer, which used him as a vessel to exert influence over the human world.

=== Manipulating events ===
In 1983, after Eleven unwittingly opened the Mothergate and created the Upside Down, Vecna chose not to act directly, instead allowing a lone Demogorgon to explore Hawkins and acquire a human host, that being Will Byers. Although Will managed to avoid him for a week in the Upside Down, he was eventually captured by the Demogorgon, and was brought to Vecna in the Hawkins Library. He tells Will that they will do "such beautiful things" together, and infects him with a tentacle, establishing Will's connection to the hive mind. Although Will was later rescued by his friends and family, he was changed by the ordeal, beginning to see flashes of the Upside Down.

In 1984, Vecna and the Mind Flayer launched their first attempt to invade Earth. Harnessing Will's connection to the hive mind, he has the Mind Flayer possess him, using him to both telekinetically build a series of tunnels from the Mothergate under Hawkins, and to spy on his enemies, having him trick the soldiers of Hawkins Lab into entering the tunnels and getting killed by adolescent Demogorgons. However, the plan fails when Eleven intervenes and closes the Mothergate, killing all life from the Upside Down that entered Earth, with Joyce Byers burning the piece of the Mind Flayer out of Will's body.

In 1985, the Soviets opened a gate of their own, allowing for the piece of the Mind Flayer that was burned out of Will to become active again. Vecna has several residents of Hawkins "flayed" and put under his control, using their bodies to form a giant flesh monster to kill Eleven. Although the monster was killed when the Soviet gate was closed, it managed to injure Eleven, allowing for Vecna to drain her powers.

=== Invasion of Hawkins ===
In 1986, Henry began to terrorize Hawkins himself, using Eleven's stolen powers to telepathically murder several students at Hawkins High School, including Chrissy Cunningham, Fred Benson, and Patrick McKinney, who shared symptoms of post-traumatic stress disorder. Dustin Henderson and Eddie Munson, who is accused of being the culprit of the murders, bestow him with the alias "Vecna" based on his similarities with the character of the same name from Dungeons & Dragons. Vecna almost kills Max Mayfield until her friends find a way to break his influence using music. He later possesses Nancy Wheeler, to whom he reveals his past, then shows her a vision of the future in which Hawkins is torn apart by cracks before freeing her. Nancy and her friends deduce that Vecna needs to open four gates to the Upside Down to execute his plan, three of which were generated at the site of each of his murders. Max tries to provoke Vecna while her friends travel to the Upside Down to kill him. Eleven, aware of his return, enters Max's mind and confronts Vecna, who is revealed to be the mastermind behind the Upside Down's previous attacks on Hawkins, dating back to 1983 when Will disappeared. Vecna possesses and kills Max before Eleven overpowers him, while Nancy, Steve Harrington, and Robin Buckley severely wound his physical form before he escapes. Although Eleven revives Max, her brief death opens a fourth gate to the Upside Down, causing cracks in Hawkins, which allow the Upside Down to begin infiltrating the city.

=== Final strikes against Hawkins ===
In 1987, Vecna starts kidnapping Hawkins' children using Demogorgons. Vecna appears to the children in his human form as Henry Creel, calling himself "Mr. Whatsit", after the character from the 1962 novel A Wrinkle in Time. His first victim is Holly Wheeler, who ends up in Vecna's memories, wherein she meets Max, who is also trapped. Vecna targets Holly's classmate and bully, Derek Turnbow, as his next victim, but Steve, Lucas, Erica, and others work together to prevent it. The military detains all of the children in Hawkins who could be potential victims.

Shortly after, Vecna and several Demogorgons attack the military base and kidnap several children. Vecna tells Will that he intends to use the children to reshape the world because they are the perfect vessels, and seemingly retreats back into the Upside Down. Vecna imprisons the children in the Abyss, a separate world connected to Hawkins via the Upside Down, which is revealed to be an interdimensional wormhole formed when Eleven made contact with a Demogorgon. Max manages to escape, but Holly is recaptured.

As Vecna tries to merge the two worlds using the children as psychic vessels, he is confronted and stopped by Max, Eleven, and Kali, with his true nature exposed to the children. While the rest of the rescue party enters the Abyss, Vecna follows the kids into the one memory that terrifies him: it is revealed that as a child, Henry touched a stone made of the Mind Flayer's particles and was infected by the entity to do its bidding. Witnessing this telepathically, Will concludes that Henry was just as much of a victim as Will himself and urges him to fight back. However, Henry refuses, having been irrevocably corrupted by the Mind Flayer. Henry reveals that, rather than controlling the Mind Flayer or it controlling him, he has embraced it, and they are now "one."

In the Abyss, Eleven tears Vecna free of the Mind Flayer's tendrils, and the two engage in battle while the rest of the party slays the Mind Flayer, weakening Vecna due to his two-way connection to the entity. Will telekinetically restrains Vecna and snaps off his left arm, allowing Eleven to fatally impale Vecna on a spike. Discovering him still barely alive after freeing the kids, Joyce Byers decapitates Vecna with an axe, bringing his reign of terror to an end.

== In other media ==
In November 2025, Vecna was added as a cosmetic outfit to Fortnite Battle Royale. In January 2026, Vecna was added as a playable Killer to Dead by Daylight.

== Reception ==
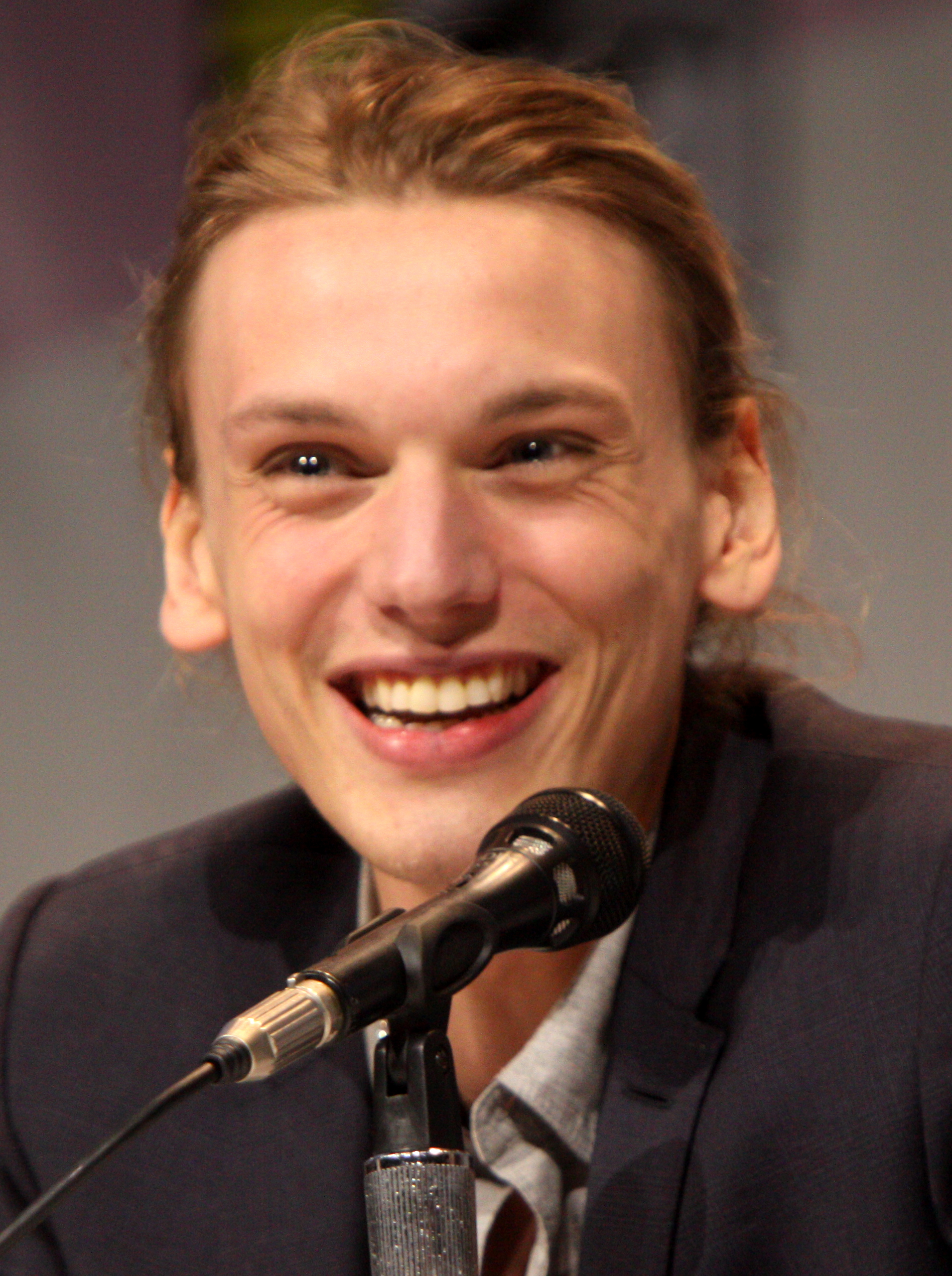
Jamie Campbell Bower portrays Vecna.

Jamie Campbell Bower's performance as Vecna has been met with a positive response from critics. Patrick Caoile of Collider said, "For the first time, Stranger Things gives us a villain with layers. Through Vecna, Bower explores a compelling, more complicated villain than the monsters that came before. From his traumatic childhood as Henry Creel to the abusive experiments he went through as One and finally to his role as the Mind Flayer's top general, Vecna is the perfect villain to pit against Eleven." Another Collider writer Robert Brian Taylor stated, "He's a compelling presence from the moment he first appears. [...] From there his performance continues to shape-shift — from intriguing to imposing to menacing," and called his monologue scene in episode seven of season four as "hypnotizing" and further deemed the scene as "Stranger Things at its best." Vulture's Devon Ivie wrote, "[Bower] has the distinction of embodying three characters, each more unsettling than the last, as the episodes unfurl: a friendly Hawkins Laboratory orderly; Henry Creel, aka "One"; and the most significant villain of the series thus far, Vecna." Movie Web named Vecna as the best villain in Stranger Things and also highlighted the way the character treated his victims. His performance gained further recognition by Tara Bennett from IGN, who called his performance "masterful," and Michael Walsh from Nerdist, who stated that Bower had delivered his best performance yet. Variety's David Benedict said, "A shuddering, terrified nerd whose monster creates havoc without and horror within...is due in no small part to the way he holds focus even in the midst of one coup-de-theatre after another".

Vecna was ranked first on the Comic Book Resources list of "10 Best Sci-Fi Villains." In 2023, Bower was nominated for the Critics' Choice Super Award for Best Villain in a Series and the MTV Movie and TV Award for Best Villain.

== See also ==
- List of Stranger Things characters
