= Will Byers =

Stranger Things character

- Stranger Things character
- Noah Schnapp as Will Byers in the fifth season
- First appearance: "Chapter One: The Vanishing of Will Byers" (2016)
- Created by: The Duffer Brothers
- Portrayed by: Noah Schnapp; Luke Kokotek (young); Miles Marthaller (young)
- Voiced by: Benjamin Plessala (Tales from '85)

In-universe information
- Full name: William Byers
- Nicknames: Will the Wise; Boy Who Came Back to Life; Zombie Boy; The Cleric; The Spy; Sorcerer
- Fighting style: Clairvoyance; Mind and Body Link; Power Absorption
- Family: Joyce Byers (mother); Lonnie Byers (father); Jonathan Byers (brother); Jane "Eleven" Hopper (adoptive sister); Jim Hopper (stepfather)
- Home: Hawkins, Indiana, United States (seasons 1–3, season 5); Lenora Hills, California, United States (season 4)
- Nationality: American
- Born: March 22, 1971
- Age: 18 (as of season 5 epilogue)

William Byers is a fictional character from the Netflix science fiction horror television series Stranger Things, portrayed by Noah Schnapp. The character appeared in a recurring capacity in the first season before being promoted to the main cast starting with the second season. Schnapp's performance and the character itself have been generally well received by critics, though not without criticism, particularly in the show's fifth and final season with his coming out scene in the seventh episode.

== Characterization ==
Noah Schnapp was cast as Will Byers in August 2015. Schnapp was promoted to series regular for the second season in October 2016. Schnapp was revealed to be returning for the third season in a main role by February 9, 2018. The idea of having Will communicate with Joyce via lightbulbs was inspired by 1980s films, including Poltergeist. In terms of the narrative in the third season, Levy said the season would be less about Will, saying, "We're not going to put Will through hell for a third season in a row. He'll be dealing with stuff, but he won't be at rock bottom... We're [going to be] dealing with forces of evil that are new."

== Fictional biography ==
=== Season 1 ===
Will Byers is introduced in the first season of Stranger Things as a quiet and sensitive boy living in Hawkins, Indiana. After encountering a creature from the Upside Down, an alternate dimension connected to Hawkins, Will disappears and is presumed dead. While trapped there, he communicates with his mother Joyce through electrical disturbances. Will is eventually located and rescued by Joyce and Jim Hopper. Following his return, he suffers lingering physical and psychological effects, indicating his continued connection to the Upside Down.

=== Season 2 ===
After his return, Will experiences difficulty readjusting to everyday life and is subjected to harassment by other students. He suffers from recurring visions of the Upside Down and is diagnosed with post-traumatic stress disorder by Dr. Sam Owens. It is later revealed that Will has been possessed by the Mind Flayer, an entity seeking to expand its influence into Hawkins. Using Will as a conduit, the Mind Flayer spreads through underground tunnels beneath the town. Will is ultimately freed from the entity's control with the help of his family and friends.

=== Season 3 ===
In the third season, Will becomes increasingly isolated as his friends begin focusing on romantic relationships. He discovers that he still retains a psychic sensitivity to the Upside Down, allowing him to detect the Mind Flayer's presence. This ability helps the group identify the entity's continued survival through its possession of Billy Hargrove. Following the defeat of the Mind Flayer during the events at Starcourt Mall, Will moves away from Hawkins with his mother, brother, and Eleven.

=== Season 4 ===
Now living in Lenora Hills, California, Will struggles with emotional repression and a sense of displacement. During Mike Wheeler’s visit for spring break, Will supports Eleven as she faces bullying and later accompanies Mike, Jonathan, and Argyle in an effort to locate her after she is taken to a facility in Nevada. During the journey, Will reveals his romantic feelings for Mike through a painting, though he does not state them directly. Upon returning to Hawkins, Will senses the Upside Down's renewed presence as it begins merging with the real world.

=== Season 5 ===
In the fifth season, Will remains in Hawkins as the town is placed under military quarantine following the breach between dimensions. His psychic connection to the Upside Down intensifies, allowing him to perceive events from the perspective of its creatures and track Vecna’s movements. Will plays a central role in locating and protecting children targeted by Vecna and later demonstrates the ability to disrupt the hive mind through his connection to it. Will comes out as gay to his family and friends, who express their support. During the final confrontation, Will uses his psychic link to help weaken Vecna, contributing to his defeat and the destruction of the Upside Down. The series ends with Will graduating alongside his friends. In a narrated flashforward, it is implied that Will moves to a more LGBT-friendly city and finds a boyfriend.

== Reception ==
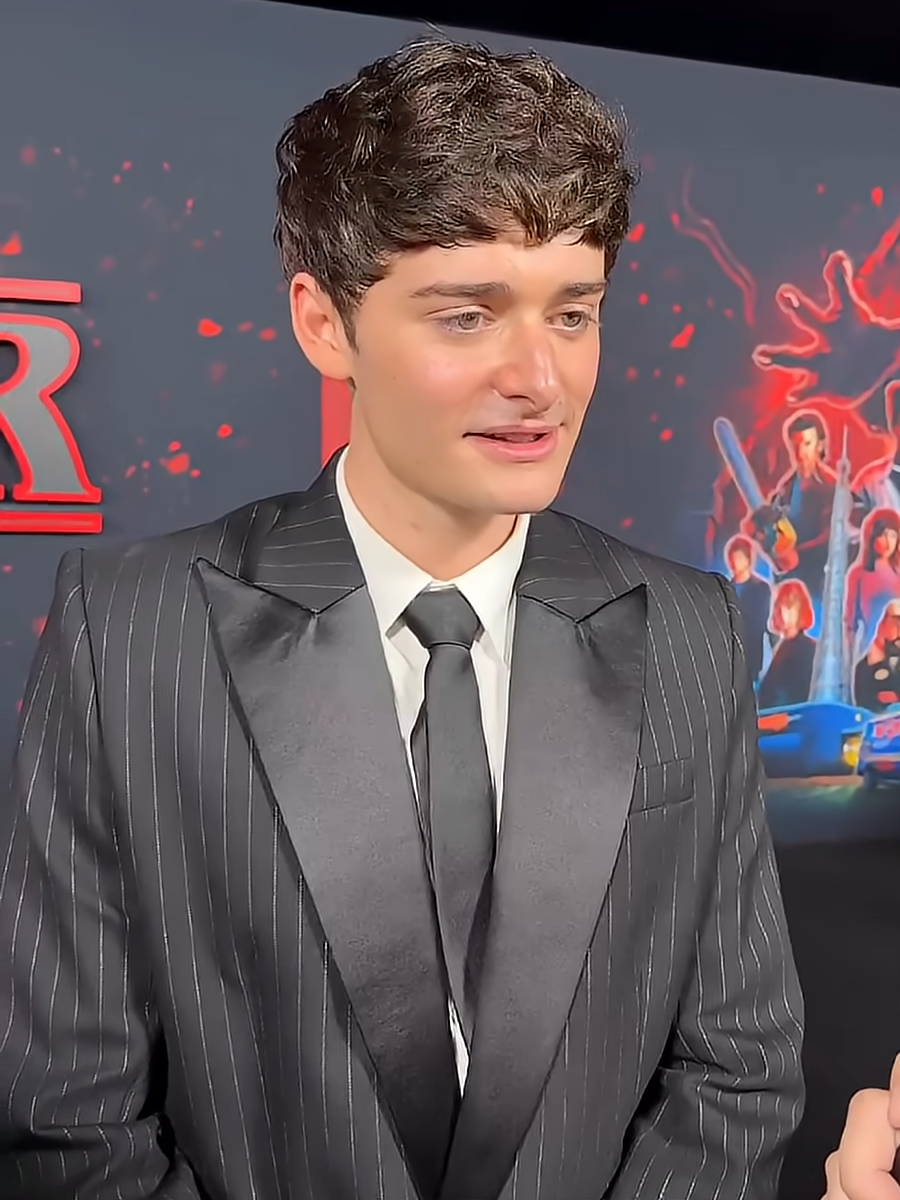
Schnapp promoting the fifth season in 2025

=== Critical reception ===
Will was ranked the third best Stranger Things character by Screen Rant, behind only Eleven and Steve Harrington. Though Schnapp's performance continued to be generally well received by most critics throughout the show's run, some critics had become more critical of the character's writing and Schnapp's portrayal by the fifth and final season.

=== Accolades ===
Schnapp received a total of two awards and six nominations for his role as Will Byers. Schnapp was nominated for an MTV Movie & TV Awards in the category of Best On-Screen Team with other cast members Gaten Matarazzo, Finn Wolfhard, Caleb McLaughlin, and Sadie Sink in 2018, as well as in the category of Most Frightened Performance the same year, which he won. Along with the rest of the main cast in the second season, Schnapp was awarded the Screen Actors Guild Awards in the category of Outstanding Performance by an Ensemble in a Drama Series in 2017. For the third season, the main cast (including Schnapp) was once again nominated for the same award, however this time the cast did not win. In 2017, Schnapp was nominated for the category of Best Performance in a Digital TV Series or Film – Young Actor. For his performance in the fifth season, Schnapp was nominated for the Saturn Award for Best Performance by a Younger Actor in a Television Series at the 53rd Saturn Awards.

=== Sexuality ===
In the penultimate episode, Will comes out as gay to his friends and family. Variety praised the scene for its earnest nature and empowerment, but the episode was review bombed on several sites due to issues of the scene's length, writing, direction, and performances. Prior to this canonical confirmation, viewers and critics had long speculated that Will was gay and harbored unrequited romantic feelings for his best friend, Mike Wheeler. Stranger Things fans used the term "Byler" for the proposed relationship between the two characters. The fourth season contained significant subtext, including a scene where Will becomes emotional after giving Mike a painting under the pretense it was from Eleven, which critics interpreted as an acknowledgment of his sexuality.

Series creators the Duffer Brothers stated these scenes were meant to show Will "relieving himself of some of that burden" and planned to continue this character arc into the final season. Actor Noah Schnapp had also stated in July 2022 that he believed it was "100% clear" Will was gay and in love with Mike. In January 2023, Schnapp himself came out as gay, saying he "had more in common" with the Will Byers character than he previously thought.
