= Jake Connelly =

American actor (born 2012)

- Born: March 5, 2012 (age 14); Chicago, Illinois, U.S.
- Occupation: Actor
- Years active: 2022–present
- Known for: Stranger Things

Jake Connelly (born 5 March 2012) is an American actor. He is known for his role as Derek Turnbow in the fifth and final season of the Netflix science fiction horror series Stranger Things.

== Early life ==
Jake Connelly was born in 2012. He was raised in Arlington Heights, Illinois. As of 2025, he attends middle school in the Chicago area. Connelly plays American football on his school team as a right tackle on the offensive line and on the inside defense. He is a fan of the Chicago Bears .

Prior to being cast in Stranger Things, Connelly was a fan of series, having caught up on the show with his family when the fourth season was released.

== Career ==
Connelly began acting several years before his television debut. His first acting roles were in commercials for Feldco Windows directed by a family friend. His only credit prior to Stranger Things was a short film titled Between the Silence.

In July 2024, Connelly was cast in the fifth season of Stranger Things. He received the call confirming he had won the role while sheltering in his basement during a tornado warning. To keep his casting a secret, he told his schoolmates that he was filming a documentary about mayonnaise.

Connelly portrayed Derek Turnbow. The character is introduced as a bully who torments Holly Wheeler, but later becomes an ally to the protagonists.

== Filmography ==
=== Television ===
Year	Title	Role	Notes/Ref
2025	Stranger Things	Derek Turnbow	Also starring (season 5); 7 episodes

=== Short film ===
Year	Title	Role	Notes
2022	Between the Silence	Jakub	
