= Linnea Berthelsen =

Danish actress

- Born: India
- Education: East 15 Acting School
- Occupation: Actress
- Years active: 2014–present

Linnea Berthelsen is an Indian actress, best known for her recurring role as Kali Prasad / Eight in the second and fifth seasons of the Netflix series Stranger Things.

== Early life ==
Berthelsen was born in India, adopted, and brought up in Kalundborg, Denmark. She moved to England in 2014 to study at East 15 Acting School in Essex.

== Career ==
Berthelsen started acting in her early teens. She made her acting debut in the short film Mirrors in 2014. She later continued to appear in short films such as Natskygge, Dyspno and Cape Fear. In 2015, she appeared in the Danish film Hybrid. In 2017, she was cast as Kali Prasad / Eight for the second season of the Netflix science fiction horror series Stranger Things. She reprised the role for the series' fifth season in 2025.

== Filmography ==
=== Film ===
Year	Title	Role	Notes
2014	Mirrors	Signe	Short film
2014	Teenland	Patient	Short film
2014	Alma	Alma	Short film
2015	Hybrid	Clara	
2015	Natskygge	Leading role	Short film
2015	Aisha	Aisha	Short film
2015	Dyspno	Fie	Short film
2015	Cape Fear	Gabrielle	Short film

=== Television ===
Year	Title	Role	Notes
2016	Exitium	Ezra	Pilot
2017; 2025	Stranger Things	Kali Prasad / Eight	Recurring role
2019	The Desert	Nura	1 episode
2020	Devs	Jen	4 episodes
