= List of Stranger Things episodes =

Episodes of American television series

Stranger Things is an American science fiction, horror, mystery, and drama television series created by the Duffer Brothers for the streaming service Netflix. The brothers, as well as Karl Gajdusek in the first season only, are the program's showrunners. They also executive produce the series with Shawn Levy and Dan Cohen. The show features a large ensemble cast and takes place in the fictional town of Hawkins, Indiana. It is set in the 1980s and revolves around the actions of the town's citizens when a government agency experiments with the paranormal and supernatural using human test subjects. In the process, they create a portal to an alternate dimension known as the Upside Down.

The first season of eight episodes was released on July 15, 2016. A second season of nine episodes and third season of eight episodes were released on October 27, 2017, and July 4, 2019, respectively. The fourth season was delayed due to the COVID-19 pandemic. Consisting of nine episodes split across two volumes, the first seven episodes of season four were released on May 27, 2022, and the final two were released on July 1, 2022. This season also featured a significant increase in episode lengths equivalent to that of many feature films, with run times ranging from 63 to 150 minutes. In February 2022, Netflix renewed the series for a fifth and final season. Production on season five was delayed by the 2023 Writers Guild of America and SAG-AFTRA strikes. It was later revealed that the season would contain eight episodes and be released across November and December 2025 in three segments.

Along with COVID-19 and strike delays, the series also requires extensive visual and special effects which has contributed to the extended time period between release dates. Stranger Things is considered one of Netflix's flagship series and has set viewership records on the platform. It has also been the subject of praise from critics and has gained a cult following. The series has won several accolades and been nominated for numerous others. It has also spawned a prequel stage play, The First Shadow (2023), and an animated spin-off, Tales from '85 (2026). During the course of the series, 42 episodes of Stranger Things were released over five seasons, between July 15, 2016, and December 31, 2025.

== Series overview ==
Season	Episodes		Originally released
1	8		July 15, 2016
2	9		October 27, 2017
3	8		July 4, 2019
4	9	7	May 27, 2022
4	9	2	July 1, 2022
5	8	4	November 26, 2025
5	8	3	December 25, 2025
5	8	1	December 31, 2025

== Episodes ==
=== Season 1 (2016) ===
No. overall	No. in season	Title	Directed by	Written by	Original release date
1	1	"Chapter One: The Vanishing of Will Byers"	The Duffer Brothers	The Duffer Brothers	July 15, 2016
2	2	"Chapter Two: The Weirdo on Maple Street"	The Duffer Brothers	The Duffer Brothers	July 15, 2016
3	3	"Chapter Three: Holly, Jolly"	Shawn Levy	Jessica Mecklenburg	July 15, 2016
4	4	"Chapter Four: The Body"	Shawn Levy	Justin Doble	July 15, 2016
5	5	"Chapter Five: The Flea and the Acrobat"	The Duffer Brothers	Alison Tatlock	July 15, 2016
6	6	"Chapter Six: The Monster"	The Duffer Brothers	Jessie Nickson-Lopez	July 15, 2016
7	7	"Chapter Seven: The Bathtub"	The Duffer Brothers	Justin Doble	July 15, 2016
8	8	"Chapter Eight: The Upside Down"	The Duffer Brothers	Story by : Paul Dichter; Teleplay by : The Duffer Brothers	July 15, 2016

=== Season 2 (2017) ===
No. overall	No. in season	Title	Directed by	Written by	Original release date
9	1	"Chapter One: MADMAX"	The Duffer Brothers	The Duffer Brothers	October 27, 2017
10	2	"Chapter Two: Trick or Treat, Freak"	The Duffer Brothers	The Duffer Brothers	October 27, 2017
11	3	"Chapter Three: The Pollywog"	Shawn Levy	Justin Doble	October 27, 2017
12	4	"Chapter Four: Will the Wise"	Shawn Levy	Paul Dichter	October 27, 2017
13	5	"Chapter Five: Dig Dug"	Andrew Stanton	Jessie Nickson-Lopez	October 27, 2017
14	6	"Chapter Six: The Spy"	Andrew Stanton	Kate Trefry	October 27, 2017
15	7	"Chapter Seven: The Lost Sister"	Rebecca Thomas	Justin Doble	October 27, 2017
16	8	"Chapter Eight: The Mind Flayer"	The Duffer Brothers	The Duffer Brothers	October 27, 2017
17	9	"Chapter Nine: The Gate"	The Duffer Brothers	The Duffer Brothers	October 27, 2017

=== Season 3 (2019) ===
No. overall	No. in season	Title	Directed by	Written by	Original release date
18	1	"Chapter One: Suzie, Do You Copy?"	The Duffer Brothers	The Duffer Brothers	July 4, 2019
19	2	"Chapter Two: The Mall Rats"	The Duffer Brothers	The Duffer Brothers	July 4, 2019
20	3	"Chapter Three: The Case of the Missing Lifeguard"	Shawn Levy	William Bridges	July 4, 2019
21	4	"Chapter Four: The Sauna Test"	Shawn Levy	Kate Trefry	July 4, 2019
22	5	"Chapter Five: The Flayed"	Uta Briesewitz	Paul Dichter	July 4, 2019
23	6	"Chapter Six: E Pluribus Unum"	Uta Briesewitz	Curtis Gwinn	July 4, 2019
24	7	"Chapter Seven: The Bite"	The Duffer Brothers	The Duffer Brothers	July 4, 2019
25	8	"Chapter Eight: The Battle of Starcourt"	The Duffer Brothers	The Duffer Brothers	July 4, 2019

=== Season 4 (2022) ===
No. overall	No. in season	Title	Directed by	Written by	Original release date
26	1	"Chapter One: The Hellfire Club"	The Duffer Brothers	The Duffer Brothers	May 27, 2022
27	2	"Chapter Two: Vecna's Curse"	The Duffer Brothers	The Duffer Brothers	May 27, 2022
28	3	"Chapter Three: The Monster and the Superhero"	Shawn Levy	Caitlin Schneiderhan	May 27, 2022
29	4	"Chapter Four: Dear Billy"	Shawn Levy	Paul Dichter	May 27, 2022
30	5	"Chapter Five: The Nina Project"	Nimród Antal	Kate Trefry	May 27, 2022
31	6	"Chapter Six: The Dive"	Nimród Antal	Curtis Gwinn	May 27, 2022
32	7	"Chapter Seven: The Massacre at Hawkins Lab"	The Duffer Brothers	The Duffer Brothers	May 27, 2022
33	8	"Chapter Eight: Papa"	The Duffer Brothers	The Duffer Brothers	July 1, 2022
34	9	"Chapter Nine: The Piggyback"	The Duffer Brothers	The Duffer Brothers	July 1, 2022

=== Season 5 (2025) ===
No. overall	No. in season	Title	Directed by	Written by	Original release date
35	1	"Chapter One: The Crawl"	The Duffer Brothers	The Duffer Brothers	November 26, 2025
36	2	"Chapter Two: The Vanishing of Holly Wheeler"	The Duffer Brothers	The Duffer Brothers	November 26, 2025
37	3	"Chapter Three: The Turnbow Trap"	Frank Darabont	Caitlin Schneiderhan	November 26, 2025
38	4	"Chapter Four: Sorcerer"	The Duffer Brothers	Paul Dichter	November 26, 2025
39	5	"Chapter Five: Shock Jock"	Frank Darabont	Curtis Gwinn	December 25, 2025
40	6	"Chapter Six: Escape from Camazotz"	Shawn Levy	Kate Trefry	December 25, 2025
41	7	"Chapter Seven: The Bridge"	The Duffer Brothers and Shawn Levy	The Duffer Brothers	December 25, 2025
42	8	"Chapter Eight: The Rightside Up"	The Duffer Brothers	The Duffer Brothers	December 31, 2025
