= Stranger Things: Tales from '85 =

American animated science fiction TV series

- Genre: Science fiction; Horror; Comedy-drama
- Based on: Stranger Things by The Duffer Brothers
- Developed by: Eric Robles; Jennifer Muro
- Showrunner: Eric Robles
- Voices of: Brooklyn Davey Norstedt; Luca Diaz; Braxton Quinney; Jolie Hoang-Rappaport; Elisha "EJ" Williams; Benjamin Plessala; Odessa A'zion; Brett Gipson; Jeremy Jordan
- Music by: Brad Breeck
- Country of origin: United States
- Original language: English
- No. of seasons: 2
- No. of episodes: 18

Production
- Executive producers: Eric Robles; The Duffer Brothers; Shawn Levy; Dan Cohen; Hilary Leavitt
- Editors: Matthew Brailey; Hugo Morales; Doug Tiano; Eric Davidson
- Running time: 25–32 minutes
- Production companies: Netflix Animation Studios; Upside Down Pictures; 21 Laps Entertainment; Flying Bark Productions Los Angeles

Original release
- Network: Netflix
- Release: April 23, 2026 – present

Related
- Stranger Things franchise

Stranger Things: Tales from '85 is an American animated science fiction television series and a spin-off of Netflix's Stranger Things. First announced by Netflix in April 2025, it was executive produced by Stranger Things creators Matt and Ross Duffer, as well as Shawn Levy and Dan Cohen of 21 Laps, Hilary Leavitt of Upside Down Pictures, and Eric Robles with Flying Bark Productions.

The series takes place between the events of the second and third seasons of Stranger Things, and depicts the children – Eleven, Mike, Dustin, Lucas, Will, and Max – as they confront new monsters of the Upside Down, and unravel a "paranormal mystery terrorizing their town". The Duffers intended to capture the feel of an '80s Saturday-morning cartoon in the Stranger Things universe.

Stranger Things: Tales from '85 premiered on April 23, 2026, on Netflix, to mixed reviews from critics. Five days later, the series was renewed for a second season, which was released on September 17, 2026.

== Premise ==
The series is set in Hawkins in the winter of 1985, between the events of the second and third seasons of Stranger Things, where "the original characters must fight new monsters and unravel a paranormal mystery". The Upside Down's influence is again seeping into the town: familiar locations such as Hawkins National Laboratory resurface, and new supernatural creatures emerge (early descriptions include threats such as Upside Down pumpkin zombies and vine-like monsters).

Official descriptions emphasize that the series is an "epic new animated series", promising a blend of nostalgia and horror reminiscent of Stranger Things's tone. According to showrunner Eric Robles, the setup involves "something brewing in Hawkins", with the kids banding together to investigate the disturbances, much like in the original series. The tone is said to be more family-friendly and brighter in its visuals than the live-action show (described by Netflix and press reports as "entry-level Stranger Things" suitable for broader audiences).

== Voice cast and characters ==
- Brooklyn Davey Norstedt as Eleven / Jane Hopper
- Luca Diaz as Mike Wheeler
- Braxton Quinney as Dustin Henderson
- Elisha "EJ" Williams as Lucas Sinclair
- Ben Plessala as Will Byers
- Jolie Hoang-Rappaport as Max Mayfield
- Odessa A'zion as Nikki Baxter
- Brett Gipson as Jim Hopper
- Janeane Garofalo as Anna Baxter
- Jeremy Jordan as Steve Harrington
- Griffin Burns as Jonathan Byers
- Lou Diamond Phillips as Daniel Fischer
- Robert Englund as Cosmo
- Alysia Reiner as Karen Wheeler
- Jim Titus as Officer Powell
- Miriam Flynn as Flo
- Alessandra Antonelli as Nancy Wheeler
- Jordan Reynolds as Officer Callahan
- Valeria Rodriguez as Rosario
- Jack Griffo as Jeff Nelson

== Episodes ==
Season	Episodes	Originally released
1	10	April 23, 2026
2	8	September 17, 2026

=== Season 1 (2026) ===
No. overall	No. in season	Title	Directed by	Written by	Original release date
1	1	"Chapter One: Welcome to Hawkins, New Kid"	Eric Robles; Sarah Jean Partington	Jennifer Muro; Eric Robles	April 23, 2026
On January 10, 1985, a mysterious scientist incinerates a lingering creature from the Upside Down, inadvertently releasing iridescent green spores that settle into the Hawkins snow. While Mike, Dustin, Lucas, Will, and Max plan to spend their winter break shoveling snow for extra cash, Eleven remains hidden in the cabin under Hopper's strict "rules". At school, the group encounters Nikki Baxter, a creative "tinker" and transfer student with a pink mohawk who quickly captures their interest. The science teacher Scott Clarke also goes on a sabbatical and is replaced by Anna Baxter, Nikki's mother. The calm of the winter break is shattered when a "snow shark" monster—a subterranean predator from the Upside Down—drags Dustin's bullies Charlie Dandridge and Jeff Nelson underground, forcing the kids to abandon their plans and form a trap using Dustin as reluctant bait. However, the plan goes awry when the creature ignores Dustin and instead targets Nikki, who is alone and unaware, leaving her in immediate danger.
2	2	"Chapter Two: Bad Harvest"	JJ Conway	Eric Robles; Chad Quandt	April 23, 2026
Eleven, Mike, Dustin, Max, Lucas, and Will rescue Nikki from being devoured by the snow shark. Following a struggle, Eleven uses her powers to rip the creature apart, freeing Charlie. Nikki seeks answers and later hosts the gang at her home, where Dustin establishes the Hawkins Investigators Club (the H.I.C). After investigating the abandoned laboratory, the club searches for leads of monsters around Hawkins. Charlie later questions Dustin about the monster and the disappearance of his friend Jeff. Dustin is evasive and conceals knowledge of the Upside Down. Max and Lucas investigate the sighting of a pumpkin monster at the farm of Ella and Danny's grandpa. They encounter several mutated pumpkin monsters and use a combine harvester to kill them. Learning that pumpkins from the farm have been sent to a pie eating contest at the Hawkins Winter, the gang disrupt the festival but a contestant named Rosario is infected by spores from a contaminated pie. In the forest, the gang discover that a monster from the Upside Down has taken over Rosario's body, leaving her in a catatonic state.
3	3	"Chapter Three: Evolution"	JJ Conway	Jennifer Muro; Chad Quandt	April 23, 2026
The octopus-like monster swallows Rosario and attacks the gang, who fight back. Before the monster can devour the group, Will injures it with a mallet, distracting the monster long enough for Eleven to impale the creature with one of its own tentacles. Though the monster is killed, it releases spores into the forest. After returning Rosario to her home, the gang meet up at the arcade where Dustin identifies the monster that chased them in the snow as an Aboleth. Since the gate to the Upside Down is still sealed, the gang deduce they are dealing with remnants that survived the events at Hawkins laboratory. After consulting with Anna, they theorize that the Upside Down offshoots depend on a human host to survive and that they spread through spores. While investigating a nearby lumber yard, the group are attacked by a pack of canine-like monsters who have captured two lumber yard workers. Eleven manages to use her powers to free the two men while the group lead the monsters on a chase. The group discovers that the monsters do not need human hosts to survive anymore. She manages to ram a tractor into one of the creatures, causing an explosion. The second creature hurls Eleven against a stack of logs, trapping her.
4	4	"Chapter Four: The Confession"	Philip J. Allora; JJ Conway	Dan Milano	April 23, 2026
Steve Harrington and Natalie return from a date but Natalie takes offense when he gets her confused with Nancy. While returning to his car, he attracts the attention of a canine-like monster, which leaps onto the hood of his car. Mike tends to the injured Eleven while the group argue whether to continue the pursuit or inform Hopper. Despite Dustin's objections, Mike takes Eleven home, causing the gang to split up. Nikki invites Will to visit her "mosh pit." While waiting for Hopper to return from his shift, Mike and Eleven wait at the cabin. There, Eleven confronts Mike for preventing her from using her powers against the monsters. Following a conversation, Mike agrees to let Eleven use her powers while Eleven agrees to communicate more. Dustin later encounters Steve, who relates his encounter with the canine monster, and temporarily inducts him into the Hawkins Investigators Club. Working together, the two lure all the canine monsters into the incinerator at the garbage dump, killing them. Jubilant, they race to Hopper's cabin hoping to convince the others not to inform Hopper. Meanwhile, Max and Lucas lose Dustin's polaroid photo of their canine monster to Keith, the young man running a video arcade. Unable to retrieve the photo, they rush to Hopper's cabin. Hopper returns as the gang converges.
5	5	"Chapter Five: The Weekly Watcher"	Ben Choi	Joshua Pruett	April 23, 2026
Upset at the presence of the uninvited visitors, Hopper orders Eleven's friends to leave. Nikki is upset after overhearing Mike's remarks about her not truly belonging to the gang and leaves. The following day, the Hawkins Investigators Club pursues Keith on their bikes but Keith reveals that he has already given Dustin's polaroid photo to the editor of the tabloid newspaper, The Weekly Watcher. The gang decide to infiltrate the newspaper's office to prevent them from publishing the photo and enlist the help of Nancy. While Nancy distracts the security guard at the reception area, the boys infiltrate the newspaper offices. Lucas manages to recover the photo from the editor's office but is cornered by the newsroom staff. Eleven rescues him by using her powers to conjure up a storm, allowing Lucas to rejoin Mike, Dustin and Will. After escaping in Nancy's car, Dustin rips up the photo. The so-called "snake monster" in The Weekly Watcher is revealed to be a monster from the Upside Down that has taken Jeff captive.
6	6	"Chapter Six: A Storm Is Coming"	Ashe Jacobson	Ray Utarnachitt	April 23, 2026
On the night of November 12, 1984, a team of military personnel in hazmats use flamethrowers to incinerate the deceased Upside Down monsters. They also conduct experiments on worm-like creatures, killing all except one. The surviving creature releases an offspring, which is incinerated with a flamethrower. However, the dying creature releases several spores into the forest. On January 15, 1985, Anna experiments on a dying tomato plant in the classroom. Nikki is upset with her friends and wants to leave Hawkins. Will tries to reconnect with her and pulls a fire alarm so that they and Mike can get sent into detention together, along with Charlie. Mike and Will reconcile with Nikki and join forces with Charlie to escape detention. However, they discover the coach, who was running the detention class, has been taken over by a monster. While retrieving a ball for a young boy from a sewer, Max and Lucas encounter several Upside Down monsters. During the chase, one of the monsters is crushed by a rockfall. They find Jeff inside and revive him. Meanwhile, Dustin goes on a bike ride with Rosario, who reveals that she experienced visions of a creature with a red light controlling the other creatures. Dustin deduces that the new Upside Down monsters are controlled by a hive mind.
7	7	"Chapter Seven: Enter the Storm"	Philip J. Allora	Dan Milano	April 23, 2026
At Hawkins Middle School Mike, Will and Nikki are pursued by the Upside Down monster through the school corridors. The monster captures Charlie, who enters a trance-like state. Retreating to the chemistry lab, the three use various chemicals and tools to lure the creature into a trap and incinerate it. Meanwhile, Eleven senses her friends are in trouble and travels to the school through a blizzard. Elsewhere, Dustin is picked up by Anna's boyfriend Daniel Fischer, a former Hawkins Institute trainee scientist who now works at the Food Mart on Abbey Street. The two shelter at the Food Mart during the blizzard, with Daniel leaving at the end of the storm. Meanwhile Max, Lucas, and Jeff escape the sewers through a manhole. After Jeff separates from them, the pair travel through the snowy forest and climb to the top of a telecommunications tower. They manage to reestablish contact with the others' walkie talkies. Max and Lucas reveal that the monsters are heading north-west towards the Food Mart, putting Dustin in danger.
8	8	"Chapter Eight: The Party"	Ben Choi	Jennifer Bardekoff; Ray Utarnachitt	April 23, 2026
Two of the Upside Down monsters stalk Dustin through the Food Mart. Eleven arrives with Lucas and Max, and uses her powers to destroy one of the monsters. The second monster grabs Dustin's backpack and flees back to the hive mind. While Daniel mourns over the destruction of his business (which is attributed to storm damage), the Hawkins Investigators Club searches Hawkins' sewers, seeking to find the hive mind, which they nickname "Horde Prime." While marking Eleven's 13th birthday, the gang are attacked in the sewers by a tentacled monster, which they electrocute. The gang return to Nikki's garage to celebrate Nikki and Eleven's birthdays. While visiting Nikki's home to use the bathroom, Dustin discovers Anna and Daniel talking about the former's true purpose in Hawkins. Inside the bathroom, Dustin sees a distant red light in the horizon and concludes that Anna is "Horde Prime."
9	9	"Chapter Nine: The Suspect"	Ashe Jacobson	Alexis Quasarano	April 23, 2026
After leaving Nikki's home, Dustin breaks the news about Anna's purported experiments to the rest of the gang. The following day, Nikki is upset to learn from Anna that they are planning to relocate from Hawkins. She rejoins the Hawkins Investigators Club and agrees to help expose Anna's secret experiments. While Mike and Eleven accompany Anna and Nikki on a car trip, Max and Will break into the Baxter home where they uncover video tapes showing experiments on vines from the Upside Down. Dustin and Lucas accidentally alert the police and the four teenagers take steps to avoid them by releasing the brake on their car. The four later discover a secret laboratory under the Baxter greenhouse. Meanwhile, the Baxters, Mike and Eleven are attacked by more Upside Down monsters, who are drawn by goo on Nikki's headset. Eleven displays her powers and destroys the creatures. The three learn that Anna is not behind the outbreak of Upside Down monsters, while the rest of the gang are discovered by Daniel, a former Hawkins scientist and the true culprit.
10	10	"Chapter Ten: Countdown"	Philip J. Allora	Ryan Little; Kevin Burke; Chris "Doc" Wyatt	April 23, 2026
Daniel seeks to reassure the children that the Upside Down vine-like monster is contained but the creature, sensing the green goo, causes the ground to collapse, pulling him and the gang into an underground tunnel system inhabited by more monsters, created through Daniel's spore experiments. Meanwhile, Eleven, Mike, and the Baxters travel into the underground tunnel system where they reunite with the others and Daniel. Daniel attempts to retrieve his spore samples but is devoured by a large Upside Down monster, which uses the spores to open a gateway into the Upside Down. The Baxters and the Hawkins Investigation Club join forces to stop the monster, which grabs Eleven. Nikki uses a power laser weapon to seriously wound the monster, allowing Eleven to use her powers to close the doorway on the monster, killing it. Eleven spends time with Hopper then joins the rest of the gang at the Baxters' new home, where they all play D&D. Meanwhile in the Upside Down, a blue flower sprouts from the corpse of the monster that Eleven slew.

=== Season 2 (2026) ===
No. overall	No. in season	Title	Directed by	Written by	Original release date
11	1	"Chapter One: A Haunting in Hawkins"	Ben Choi	Dan Milano	September 17, 2026
Following the events of the first season, the Hawkins Investigators Club including Nikki searches for further manifestations of life from the Upside Down. After encountering a racoon, the group decide to suspend their hunts and focus on their schoolwork. Max's relationship with Lucas sours and she turns to Eleven for advice. Meanwhile, Charlie and his uncle burgle the video game arcade. While fleeing into the forest, Charlie's uncle Ernie is captured by mysterious blue glowing spores from the Upside Down. Charlie escapes the spores and goes into hiding. After the Police refuse to investigate the arcade burglary, Dustin convinces his friends to investigate after finding video camera footage of the blue glowing spores from the nearby forest. The Club tracks down Charlie but are attacked by a truck possessed by the blue spores. After disabling the truck, the Club conclude that it was possessed by a ghost-like entity from the Upside Down.
12	2	"Chapter Two: The Mine"	Ashe Jacobson	Kevin Burke; Chris "Doc" Wyatt	September 17, 2026
Charlie tells the Club about his and Ernie's encounter with spores among a patch of mysterious purple flowers within the forest, which they dub "Murder Flowers." While Mike, Dustin, Lucas, and Will continue working on their overdue history about Hawkins' founder Samuel Hawkins and the Bloodaxe Bill, Max and Nikki attempt to store some of the flowers inside the school's refrigeration chamber but are stopped by the lunch lady Phyllis. Later, mysterious "Hate Sprites" emerge from the flowers, prompting Max to help Phyllis kill them. Max warns the boys about the threat posed by the purple flowers. The Club investigates the patch, which releases more Hate Sprites.
13	3	"Chapter Three: The Curse of Bloodaxe Bill"	Philip J. Allora	Alexis Quasarano	September 17, 2026
While Mike, Dustin, Lucas and Will flee into a mine, Eleven, Max, and Nikki face off against the Hate Sprites. Eleven uses her psychic powers to destroy the Hate Sprites while the boys escape the mine, which is believed to be haunted by the ghost of Samuel Hawkins' rival William Dandridge ("Bloodaxe Bill"). After regrouping, the Club continue their investigation into both the Murder Flowers and Hate Sprites, which are connected to the Upside Down. To aid with their history project, Dustin, Lucas, and Will also seek out Arthur, a grandson of Bloodaxe Bill, who claims his ancestor was murdered by Hawkins and unfairly demonized. Mike joins the girls in investigating a sawmill in the forest but are attacked by a ghostly entity, which they believe to be the ghost of Bloodaxe Bill.
14	4	"Chapter Four: The Séance"	Ben Choi	Elise Bradley	September 17, 2026
The ghostly entity traps Max, who is dragged into a wood chipper. Eleven is unable to use her powers against the ghostly entity. However, the children manage to subdue the ghost by burning a box full of Murder Flowers, causing the entity to disappear. After freeing Max, the Club continue their investigation. Will and Dustin seek Rosario's advice on conducting a séance with Bloodaxe Bill while Mike and Eleven steal Nancy's ouija board. Max and Lucas talk through their differences while Nikki "borrows" liquid nitrogen from Anna. Together, the Club visit an abandoned house to conduct their séance, house but are joined by Charlie, who reveals that he is related to both Arthur and William Dandridge. During the seance, they summon an entity they believe to be the ghost of Bloodaxe Bill, who is seemingly connected to the Murder Flowers. Following a brief skirmish, they manage to escape the Murder Flowers after Eleven uses her telepathic powers to set them alight. The Club and Charlie flee into the forest while the ghost morphs into three spectral hounds.
15	5	"Chapter Five: Split the Party"	Philip J. Allora	Caitlin Schneiderhan	September 17, 2026
Pursued by the spectral hounds, the Club split up to elude their pursuers. Will and Nikki are trapped by one of the spectral hounds among a patch of Hate Sprites, which drain their energy, rendering them unconscious. Mike and Eleven flee into the forest but are pursued by one of the hounds. The hound attacks a male driver driving on a road going through the forest, rendering him unconscious. After Eleven drives the creature away, she and Mike tend to the man. Mike travels to Hawkins to seek help and encounters Nancy, who offers him some dating advice. Together, he and Eleven deduce that the "Murder Flowers" are draining energy from living organisms to fuel the mysterious ghost. Elsewhere, Max and Lucas shelter inside the sawmill where they repair their strained relationship. Meanwhile, Dustin is saved by Charlie from being mauled by a hound. With his camera low on batteries, Dustin travels with Charlie to Hawkins and steals a battery from a shop. Before they can rejoin the others, they encounter Charlie's associates Jeff, Courtney and Pauly, who have a score to settle with Dustin for damaging their dirt bikes. Charlie helps Dustin flee the gang on Charlie's dirt bike but run into the path of the ghost.
16	6	"Chapter Six: The Lich"	Ashe Jacobson	Ryan Little	September 17, 2026
Working together, Dustin and Charlie manage to evade both Jeff's dirt bike and the ghost, which they discover cannot move past areas without Murder Flower patches. The Club and Charlie convene at Nikki's house and accept Max and Lucas' conclusion that the Murder Flowers, Hate Sprites and ghost are connected to the Upside Down. Dustin concludes that the ghost is a Lich, a spiritual entity that collects power from pollen and other lifeforms. He proposes searching for the Lich's lair in order to destroy its power source, causing it to disappear. Dustin uses a watertower to determine the location of the Lich's lair. The Club search the Lich's lair while Eleven uses her psychic to search for the Lich within the Upside Down. The Club encounters several wooden golem statues, which are animated by Hate Sprites. These golems attack the Club after Charlie hurls rocks at them. The Hawkins Investigators Club gain the upper hand after Max discovers that the golems can be destroyed if they strike their heads. Eleven informs the others that the deceased Daniel is the ghostly Lich.
17	7	"Chapter Seven: The Golem"	Ben Choi	Dan Milano	September 17, 2026
In the Upside-Down, a spectral Daniel emerges from the remains of the slain monster that has devoured him during the climax of Season 1. He experiences warm memories of Nikki and her mother before remembering his death. The horrified Daniel then falls and merges with the root system controlling the Murder Flowers, Hate Sprites and Golems. Daniel possesses a Golem which confronts Eleven, Mike, Will, and Nikki in the forest. Nikki tries to reconcile with her mother's boyfriend but the creature is hostile. Eleven fights back with her powers but is unable to prevent him from capturing Mike. Meanwhile Dustin, Lucas, Max, and Charlie escape through a manhole but encounter their irate history teacher. After passing him, they find the Hate Sprites departing the Murder Flowers and heading towards Hawkins.
18	8	"Chapter Eight: Count to Five"	Philip J. Allora	Kevin Burke; Chris "Doc" Wyatt	September 17, 2026
The Hate Sprites descend on Hawkins, harrying several civilians including Jeannie and her boyfriend Bradley. Charlie, Dustin, Will and Nikki use their dirt bikes to lure the sprites into a mine full of Murder Flowers; with Charlie inadvertently uncovering evidence exonerating his ancestor William Dandridge. Having trapped the creatures, Charlie uses a pick axe to ignite the flammable Hate Sprites and Murder Flowers. Meanwhile, Lucas and Max use flamethrowers to destroy patches of Murder Flowers. Before they can eliminate a grove near a derelict metal bridge, they are cornered by a vindictive Jeff, Courtney and Pauly. Lucas and Max fight the trio, causing a fire that destroys the bridge and Murder Flowers in the process. Eleven goes to confront the Daniel Golem and rescue Mike. She finds the Golem attempting to open a rift that leads to the Upside Down. She fights the monster with her telepathic powers and tells Mike not to let the creature feed on his fear. Encouraged by memories of his sister Nancy, Mike breaks free. Weakened by the simultaneous destruction of the Hate Sprites and Murder Flowers, the Golem (who is controlled by Vecna) collapses while the doorway is sealed. In the Upside-Down, Daniel dies a final death and his body turns to ashes. Later, the Hawkins Investigators Club learn that Nikki's mother has landed a new job as Hawkins' local high school science teacher. While Mike starts a relationship with Eleven, Lucas exposes Samuel Hawkins' deception and clears Dandridge's name. The Hate Sprite incident is explained away as a firefly infestation.

== Production ==
=== Development ===
In February 2022, Stranger Things creators the Duffer Brothers announced their intention to create spin-offs. In July 2022, Netflix revealed that such a series was in the works. In April 2023, the network greenlit a straight-to-series order for an animated series set in the Stranger Things universe. The animation is being provided by Flying Bark Productions, with Eric Robles, the Duffer Brothers, Shawn Levy and Dan Cohen as executive producers. The Duffers said the series would be in the vein of the Saturday-morning cartoons they grew up with. In 2025, it was revealed that the spin-off would be titled Stranger Things: Tales from '85, and as the title implies, it is set in the winter of 1985, between the second and third seasons of the main series. The series will introduce a new character named Nikki Baxter who is said to be "a tinker", and who has pinkish hair that is short on the sides. On November 6, 2025, Netflix released a teaser for Tales from '85, also revealing its voice cast. In April 2026, the series was renewed for a second season.

=== Animation ===
Animation is handled by Flying Bark Productions in Sydney. Robles cites 1980s cartoons and young adult horror as major influences, including He-Man and the Masters of the Universe, Scooby-Doo and especially The Real Ghostbusters (which he referred to as his "north star"). The production team also studied modern animated successes like Spider-Man: Into the Spider-Verse and Arcane in creating the visual style. Prominent creature designer Carlos Huante, known for E.T. the Extra-Terrestrial and Prometheus, was involved in creating the new monsters.

=== Casting ===
Several main characters from the original Stranger Things series return in animated form, as well as Nikki Baxter, a new character described as "taller and bigger" than the core group who joins the Hawkins kids in their adventures. In November 2025, the voice cast was revealed. Additional voice cast members were revealed in March 2026, with one of them being Robert Englund, who had previously portrayed Victor Creel in the original series.

=== Music ===
Brad Breeck composed the series' score, which references the original series's theme composed by Kyle Dixon and Michael Stein.

== Release ==
Stranger Things: Tales from '85 premiered on Netflix on April 23, 2026, with the first two episodes premiering early via a limited release in select theaters on April 18. The second season premiered on September 17, 2026.

== Reception ==
On the review aggregator website Rotten Tomatoes, the series holds a 61% approval rating based on 36 critic reviews, with an average of rated reviews of 5.9/10. The website's critics consensus reads, "A nostalgic return to the world of Stranger Things paired with a fun animation style means Tales from '85 can steadily continue the story for a new set of younger viewers, while still appealing to the core fanbase." Metacritic, which uses a weighted average, assigned a score of 52 out of 100 based on 17 critics, indicating "mixed or average".
