= Mike Wheeler (Stranger Things) =

Stranger Things character

- Stranger Things character
- Finn Wolfhard as Mike Wheeler in the fifth season
- First appearance: "Chapter One: The Vanishing of Will Byers" (2016)
- Created by: The Duffer Brothers
- Portrayed by: Finn Wolfhard; Max Rackenberg (young)
- Voiced by: Luca Diaz (Tales from '85)

In-universe information
- Full name: Michael Wheeler
- Nicknames: Frogface; Dungeon Master; The Paladin; The Storyteller
- Family: Karen Wheeler (mother); Ted Wheeler (father); Nancy Wheeler (sister); Holly Wheeler (sister)
- Significant other: Eleven (girlfriend)
- Home: Hawkins, Indiana, United States
- Nationality: American
- Born: April 7, 1971
- Age: 18 (as of season 5 epilogue)

Michael Wheeler is a fictional character from the Netflix science fiction horror television series Stranger Things, portrayed by Finn Wolfhard. He is one of the central characters in the series, often acting as the leader of the main group of kids.

== Casting and concept ==
Noah Schnapp and Gaten Matarazzo originally auditioned to play Mike in the show. Mike was designed by series creators Matt and Ross Duffer to be a prototypical 1980s main character who is loyal and energetic, while also innocent due to his young age. His progression through the show was a coming of age arc that is also similar to other 1980s TV shows and movies that the Duffer brothers used as inspiration.

Mike was inspired by Elliott Taylor from Steven Spielberg's 1982 science fiction film E.T. the Extra-Terrestrial. In fact, Mike was originally named Elliot. Mike was also inspired by and named after Mikey Walsh (played by Sean Astin who also played Bob Newby in the series) from The Goonies.

== Fictional character biography ==
=== Season 1 ===
At the start of the series, Mike is playing Dungeons & Dragons with his friends Dustin Henderson (Gaten Matarazzo), Lucas Sinclair (Caleb McLaughlin), and Will Byers (Noah Schnapp) on November 6, 1983, when Will disappears later that night. The next day, Mike, Dustin, and Lucas encounter a mysterious girl with psychokinetic abilities named Eleven (Millie Bobby Brown) and hide her in Mike's basement. Although Will's body is later found in a quarry, Mike remains convinced that Will is alive in a parallel dimension the boys call the “Upside Down.” As the search continues, Mike frequently clashes with school bullies and grows protective of Eleven, defending her and forming a close bond with her.

After learning about alternate dimensions from their science teacher, the boys attempt to locate the Upside Down, but Eleven prevents them from approaching Hawkins National Laboratory and eventually flees after injuring Lucas during a confrontation. Mike later proves his loyalty by jumping off a cliff to save Dustin from bullies, surviving only because Eleven uses her powers to rescue him. The group ultimately builds a makeshift sensory deprivation tank to help Eleven locate Will. During this time, Mike asks Eleven to a school dance and shares his first kiss with her. When government agents arrive to reclaim Eleven, she sacrifices herself to destroy the Demogorgon, disappearing in the process. Believing Eleven to be dead, Mike is left deeply affected by her loss.

=== Season 2 ===
Dustin and Lucas become infatuated with new student Maxine "Max" Mayfield (Sadie Sink) and attempt to get her to join their group. Mike disagrees and abandons Dustin, Lucas, and Max on Halloween Night. The next day at school, Dustin reveals the new creature he discovered which he calls D'Artagnan. After seeing the creature, Will confides to Mike that the creature is from the Upside Down. At the same time as Mike confronts his feelings towards Max, Will undergoes an episode where he is possessed by "the Mind Flayer". Mike and Will witness Hawkins Lab agents torching parts of the Upside Down from underground tunnels, causing Will to begin screaming and convulsing on the ground. Will is then taken to Hawkins Lab so he can be treated. After they escape adolescent Demogorgons at Hawkins Lab, they reunite with Dustin, Lucas, Max, Nancy, Will's brother Jonathan (Charlie Heaton) and Nancy's ex-boyfriend Steve Harrington (Joe Keery).

The Byers house is surrounded by young Demogorgons and Eleven arrives and eradicates them. Mike is relieved that Eleven is alive. She leaves to close the gate at Hawkins Lab. The group enter the tunnels and douse the hub with gasoline. Months after Eleven closes the gate to the Upside Down, Mike attends the school Snow Ball with Eleven, leading to the two sharing a dance and a kiss.

=== Season 3 ===
Mike and Eleven have been dating for seven months. Both of them keep kissing all the time, much to the dismay of Eleven's adoptive father, Jim Hopper (David Harbour). An annoyed Jim threatens Mike not to meet El regularly and will end their relationship if Mike disagrees. This leads Mike to lie to Eleven and she later breaks up with him. Mike and Will have an argument where Mike says, "It's not my fault you don't like girls." Will reveals to his friends that he has been sensing the Mind Flayer. The group attempt to figure out how to get rid of the Mind Flayer for good and travel to Eleven and Hopper's house where Mike blurts out that he loves her and cannot lose her again. Eleven finds the Mind Flayer and Mike attempts to share his feelings with Eleven, but is interrupted by Dustin, who calls Mike on his walkie-talkie saying that he is in danger, but is unable to give his location before the batteries run out. Eleven finds him and his group at Starcourt Mall.

Mike, Lucas, and Will reconcile with Dustin. Mike, Eleven, and Max are separated from everybody else; they manage to hide before Lucas, Will, Nancy, and Jonathan distract the Mind Flayer. Billy finds Mike, Eleven, and Max on his own. He knocks Mike and Max unconscious, and brings Eleven to the center of the mall, where the Mind Flayer has returned. Mike and Max regain consciousness to see the Mind Flayer about to kill Eleven, but Billy sacrifices his life to save Eleven. Joyce and Hopper close the gate. Three months later, a now powerless Eleven, who has been living with the Byers, prepares to move out of Hawkins. Eleven tells Mike that she loves him and the two share a kiss before promising to visit each other during Thanksgiving.

=== Season 4 ===
Mike is now part of Hellfire, a Dungeons & Dragons club at his school, alongside Dustin and Lucas. He visits Eleven and Will in California where Eleven claims to be happy and Mike disparages Will when he explains that Eleven is being bullied. The two then witness Eleven assault her main bully and get arrested. She is then intercepted by Dr. Sam Owens and taken to the NINA project, a research facility in Nevada. Mike joins Will, Jonathan, and Argyle (Eduardo Franco) to find Eleven after the US army attacks the house, and Suzie, Dustin's girlfriend, helps them find the coordinates for NINA. Will shows Mike a painting of the group fighting a dragon and tells Mike that he makes Eleven not feel like a mistake and that the painting was her idea, but when Mike is not paying attention Will breaks down crying. They all reunite with Eleven and help her telepathically fight Vecna using an isolation tank, and when she struggles, Mike helps her overpower Vecna by telling her he loves her. Mike then returns to Hawkins where he reunites with his family before Will senses a presence and they all discover the Upside Down infiltrating Hawkins.

=== Season 5 ===
Mike remains in quarantined Hawkins, living with his family and the Byers at the Wheeler house, and helps coordinate repeated searches through the Upside Down for Vecna alongside Nancy. The Wheeler home is later attacked by Demogorgons, resulting in Holly’s abduction and Mike’s parents being hospitalized. Nancy connects the attack to a vision Vecna once showed her, making Mike realize that "Mr. Whatsit", an imaginary friend Holly reported seeing, is in fact Henry Creel. During a mission to rescue Vecna's other child captives, Mike witnesses Will kill several Demogorgons with newfound powers. He supports Will as his connection to the hivemind deepens, and after Will comes out as gay, Mike apologizes for not noticing his struggle sooner, reaffirming their friendship.

Mike joins the final mission into the Upside Down and the Abyss, assisting in the defeat of the Mind Flayer in its final form. After Vecna is killed, Mike reunites with Holly, but the group is immediately detained by the military. Realizing that Eleven has remained behind to sacrifice herself, Mike shares a final moment with her inside her mind, where she tells him she loves him and asks him to accept her decision. Eighteen months later, as Hawkins rebuilds, Mike prepares to graduate with his friends. Initially reluctant to move forward, he is encouraged by Hopper to let go of his self-blame. During a final Dungeons & Dragons game, now joined by Max, Mike imagines the group's futures, revealing that he becomes a writer. He theorizes that Eleven survived with Kali's help and chooses to believe she is alive. He watches Holly and her friends begin their own D&D campaign while leaving the basement.

== Reception ==
While ranking the characters in the show, Evan Romano of Men's Health said that Mike is "a really great character and is a blast to watch on the screen." In a review for season 3 of Stranger Things, Judy Berman of Time said Wolfhard gets "better every season." Darren Franich of Entertainment Weekly enjoyed the transition of Mike from a child to a teenager in the third season. Ritwik Mitra of Screen Rant said of Wolfhard: "the character he portrays is one of the best parts of the show" and that "from teenage angst to developing a protective mindset — Mike is definitely a model child in every way and a great part of the show." Liz Shannon Miller, Steve Greene, Hanh Nguyen, Ben Travers of IndieWire said that "his...tenacity to keep ...is a credit to his character. It's no wonder that he's the one whom Will confides in and that attempts to fight off the Mind Flayer. Mike's just a good guy to have in your corner, no matter what the circumstances." BuzzFeed said that he "really had a great thought process when it came to helping his friends and taking down the Mind Flayer."

Wolfhard won a Kids Choice Award for Favorite Male TV Star (Family) in 2023.

=== Byler debate ===
During the run of the series, Stranger Things fans debated the relationship between Mike and Will Byers, commonly referring to it as "Byler". Some fans speculated that Mike might reciprocate Will's feelings and that the series could culminate in a romantic payoff. However, the canon establishes that Will develops unrequited romantic feelings for Mike; Mike is portrayed as romantically involved with Eleven and remains unaware of Will's feelings until the final season. The series concludes with Will accepting his unrequited feelings, coming out as gay, and reaffirming his friendship with Mike in a mutually supportive way, while Mike and Eleven's relationship is maintained up to Eleven's sacrificial act at the series' end.
