= Stranger Things season 2 =

Season of television series

Stranger Things
- Season 2
- Promotional poster
- Showrunner: Matt Duffer Ross Duffer
- Starring: Winona Ryder; David Harbour; Finn Wolfhard; Millie Bobby Brown; Gaten Matarazzo; Caleb McLaughlin; Noah Schnapp; Sadie Sink; Natalia Dyer; Charlie Heaton; Joe Keery; Dacre Montgomery; Cara Buono; Sean Astin; Paul Reiser
- No. of episodes: 9

Release
- Original network: Netflix
- Original release: October 27, 2017

Season chronology
- ← Previous; Season 1 Next → Season 3

The second season of the American science fiction horror drama television series Stranger Things, marketed as Stranger Things 2, was released worldwide on the streaming service Netflix on October 27, 2017. The series was created by the Duffer Brothers, who also serve as executive producers along with Shawn Levy, Dan Cohen and Iain Paterson.

The principal cast for the season includes Winona Ryder, David Harbour, Finn Wolfhard, Millie Bobby Brown, Gaten Matarazzo, Caleb McLaughlin, Noah Schnapp, Sadie Sink, Natalia Dyer, Charlie Heaton, Joe Keery, Dacre Montgomery, Cara Buono, Sean Astin, and Paul Reiser, while the recurring cast includes Brett Gelman, Linnea Berthelsen, Matthew Modine, and Priah Ferguson. The season received critical acclaim for its acting, characters, story, production values, and darker tone compared to the previous season. The season received 12 nominations at the 70th Primetime Emmy Awards, including Outstanding Drama Series, and won for Outstanding Sound Editing for a Comedy or Drama Series (One-Hour).

== Premise ==
In the fall of 1984, a year after Will Byers's disappearance and eventual discovery, the town of Hawkins, Indiana, once again find itself targeted by the Upside Down. A mysterious plague begins to consume pumpkin patches around town during Halloween season. Will perceives a large and many-armed shadow entity, which the party eventually names the "Mind Flayer", that is able to possess him after an attack. Meanwhile, the larger group, including Mike Wheeler, Lucas Sinclair, and Dustin Henderson, encounter "Demogorgon dogs" or "Demodogs" which terrorize the citizens of Hawkins. Will's family and friends, alongside Jim Hopper, Mike's sister Nancy and her boyfriend Steve Harrington, Californian newcomer Max Mayfield, and a missing Eleven, must join forces to contain the threat.

== Cast and characters ==
=== Main ===
- Winona Ryder as Joyce Byers
- David Harbour as Jim Hopper
- Finn Wolfhard as Mike Wheeler
- Millie Bobby Brown as Eleven / Jane Ives / Jane Hopper
- Gaten Matarazzo as Dustin Henderson
- Caleb McLaughlin as Lucas Sinclair
- Noah Schnapp as Will Byers
- Sadie Sink as Max Mayfield
- Natalia Dyer as Nancy Wheeler
- Charlie Heaton as Jonathan Byers
- Joe Keery as Steve Harrington
- Dacre Montgomery as Billy Hargrove
- Cara Buono as Karen Wheeler
- Sean Astin as Bob Newby
- Paul Reiser as Sam Owens

=== Recurring ===
- Linnea Berthelsen as Kali / Eight
- Joe Chrest as Ted Wheeler
- Catherine Curtin as Claudia Henderson
- Priah Ferguson as Erica Sinclair
- Brett Gelman as Murray Bauman
- Karen Ceesay as Sue Sinclair
- Arnell Powell as Charles Sinclair
- Jennifer Marshall as Susan Hargrove
- Will Chase as Neil Hargrove
- Tinsley and Anniston Price as Holly Wheeler
- Cynthia Barrett as Marsha Holland
- Chester Rushing as Tommy H
- Kai L. Greene as Funshine
- Randy Havens as Scott Clarke
- Susan Shalhoub Larkin as Florence
- James Landry Hébert as Axel
- Anna Jacoby-Heron as Dottie
- Gabrielle Maiden as Mic
- Rob Morgan as Officer Powell
- John Paul Reynolds as Officer Callahan
- Chelsea Talmadge as Carol
- Madelyn Cline as Tina
- Abigail Cowen as Vicki
- Matty Cardarople as Keith
- Tony Vaughn as Principal Coleman
- Charles Lawlor as Mr. Melvald
- Aaron Muñoz as Mr. Holland
- Aimee Mullins as Terry Ives
- Amy Seimetz as Becky Ives
- Pruitt Taylor Vince as Ray
- Matthew Modine as Martin Brenner

== Episodes ==
No. overall	No. in season	Title	Directed by	Written by	Original release date
9	1	"Chapter One: MADMAX"	The Duffer Brothers	The Duffer Brothers	October 27, 2017
On October 28, 1984, a woman with the power to make people see things and with a tattoo reading "008" on her arm is part of a gang that robs a bank in Pittsburgh, Pennsylvania, and flee the cops using those powers 008 have. In Hawkins, Indiana, the townsfolk prepare for Halloween. Maxine "Max" Mayfield, a new girl at school, captures Dustin and Lucas's attention. Joyce is dating her old high school classmate Bob Newby. Hopper investigates a field of mysteriously rotting pumpkins and conspiracy theorist Murray Bauman investigates people who saw Eleven, believing her to be a Russian spy. Mike and Nancy deal with losing Eleven and Barb, and Will has been having apparent hallucinations of the Upside Down, with an enormous, tentacled shadow monster. Joyce and Hopper take Will to Hawkins Lab to the new lab's director, Dr. Sam Owens, who has been giving Will routine medical exams since his return. Owens theorizes that Will's episodes are PTSD brought on by the anniversary of his disappearance. The inter-dimensional gate in the lab's basement has been growing, worrying Owens. Nancy and Steve have dinner with Barb's parents, who still believe their daughter to be missing and who have hired Murray Bauman to find her. Hopper goes home to a cabin in the woods where he secretly lives with Eleven.
10	2	"Chapter Two: Trick or Treat, Freak"	The Duffer Brothers	The Duffer Brothers	October 27, 2017
Flashbacks reveal that after killing the Demogorgon, Eleven awoke in the Upside Down. She escaped back into the real world, but hides in the woods after seeing government officials interrogate Mike at his home. In present time, it is Halloween and Eleven asks Hopper if she can go trick-or-treating. Hopper insists that she remain hidden until he and Owens come up with an arrangement that would allow her to live a normal life, which frustrates the homebound Eleven. More pumpkin fields rot across town and Hopper discovers an organic substance in the fields. Nancy wants to tell Barb's parents the truth about her death, but Steve fears that Hawkins Lab could come after them if they tell anyone the truth. They attend a Halloween party where Nancy gets drunk and berates Steve for his lack of empathy for Barb's parents. Before leaving, Steve requests Jonathan to take Nancy home. The boys go trick-or-treating and are later joined by Max. Will has another episode and tells Mike about his visions, leading Mike to admit that he is trying to contact Eleven. Dustin returns home after trick-or-treating and finds a strange creature in his trash can.
11	3	"Chapter Three: The Pollywog"	Shawn Levy	Justin Doble	October 27, 2017
Flashbacks reveal that Hopper found Eleven in the woods and agreed to take care of her in his grandfather's old hunting cabin if she agreed not to leave the cabin. In the present, Bob encourages Will to face his fears, not understanding the nature of Will's episodes. Nancy persuades Jonathan to help her tell Barb's parents the truth. They arrange a meeting with Barb's mother in a public park the following day, fearing that Owens may be tapping the phone lines. The creature Dustin found in his trash can is a small, slug-like animal that he names D'Artagnan ("Dart"). He shows Dart to the other kids, and Will concludes that it is from the Upside Down, as it makes a noise similar to one Will heard in his visions. Hopper accuses Owens of failing to keep the gate contained, becoming increasingly concerned about the pumpkin fields. Frustrated with being stuck in the cabin, Eleven leaves to look for Mike; at the school, she sees him arguing with Max but thinks they are flirting. Will suffers another episode and follows Bob's advice to confront the shadow monster, but it latches to him.
12	4	"Chapter Four: Will the Wise"	Shawn Levy	Paul Dichter	October 27, 2017
Joyce and the kids awaken an unconscious Will. Joyce takes Will home, but finds him acting strangely, scribbling furiously on pieces of paper and demanding that the house be kept cold. Upon returning to the cabin, Eleven is grounded by Hopper for sneaking out. Th next day, Joyce calls Hopper and together they discover that Will's scribbles line up. Hopper recognizes that the drawings represent vines, and he leaves. Meanwhile, Eleven finds Hopper's research of her biological mother, Terry Ives, and tries to contact Terry with her powers. Nancy and Jonathan are captured by Owen's agents when they try to contact Barb's mother and are taken to Hawkins Lab, where Owens shows them the gate to the Upside Down. He admits Barb died in the Upside Down and says that he wants to prevent foreign governments from learning of it. They are released, and it is revealed that Nancy was secretly recording Owens. An infatuated Lucas tries to get closer to Max, but her violent older stepbrother Billy Hargrove intervenes. A horrified Dustin finds that Dart has broken out of its cage, devoured his pet cat, and is an infant Demogorgon, also known as a Demodog. Hopper digs into one of the pumpkin fields and finds a tunnel resembling the Upside Down.
13	5	"Chapter Five: Dig Dug"	Andrew Stanton	Jessie Nickson-Lopez	October 27, 2017
Hopper becomes trapped in the tunnels and passes out. Mike sleeps over at the Byers' house to help Will recover. Will has a vision of Hopper, leading Joyce to recruit Bob's help to determine its meaning. Bob identifies Will's drawings as a map of Hawkins and the pumpkin field as the place Hopper was going. Nancy and Jonathan take the tape of Owens' admission to Murray, who realizes the public will not believe the truth and suggests watering it down to make it more palatable. Lucas reveals the truth of Will's disappearance to Max. Dustin traps Dart in his storm cellar and enlists Steve's help to recapture it. Eleven tracks down Terry and Becky Ives. Terry and Eleven are able to communicate using their psychic powers, and Terry reveals to Eleven that she tried to rescue her at the lab and was subjected to a brain-damaging dose of shock therapy by Dr. Brenner. Eleven learns that there was another girl trained like her. Joyce, Bob, Will, and Mike rescue Hopper, and scientists from the lab soon arrive and set the tunnels on fire. As this happens, Will collapses and begins convulsing and screaming in agony.
14	6	"Chapter Six: The Spy"	Andrew Stanton	Kate Trefry	October 27, 2017
Will is rushed to the lab, demonstrating memory loss. Owens theorizes that the shadow monster is a virus that has spread to Will's brain and is controlling him, and that the creatures from the Upside Down share a hive mind. Therefore, damaging the tunnels will be lethal to the now-infected Will. Nancy and Jonathan spend the night at Murray's, who forces them to admit their feelings for each other. The following morning, the trio send copies of the tape of Owens' admission to numerous newspapers around the country. Nancy and Jonathan discover Will's drawings upon returning to the Byers' house. Lucas and Max regroup with Dustin and Steve, and the group attempt to lure Dart to a junkyard. Max apologizes for being hostile to Lucas, explaining that Billy's violence results from his father getting re-married to Max's mother. Dart arrives in the junkyard flanked by a pack of adolescent monsters. Steve and the kids are cornered until the pack unexpectedly run away. Steve realizes that the Demodogs are being summoned elsewhere. Will discovers a location that the monster prevents him from seeing. Unaware that the monster is manipulating Will, Owens sends a team to investigate. The team is killed by the demodogs, who make their way into the lab.
15	7	"Chapter Seven: The Lost Sister"	Rebecca Thomas	Justin Doble	October 27, 2017
Eleven travels to Chicago, Illinois, and finds the other girl from Terry's memories, named Kali. Realizing they have similar tattoos and were both experimented on by Brenner, Eleven and Kali consider themselves sisters. Kali can project images into people's minds and leads a street gang to seek revenge on Brenner. Eleven tells them that Brenner is dead, so the gang decide to kill the man who tortured Terry instead. Kali helps Eleven hone her abilities by demonstrating that channeling her anger is the key to strengthening her powers. After Eleven uses her powers to find the gang's target, named Ray, the gang travel to Ray's apartment to kill him. Eleven begins to choke Ray with her powers, leading him to reveal that Brenner is still alive. Eleven refuses to kill Ray after seeing a photo of his two young daughters, who are discovered at that same moment to be contacting the police. Eleven stops Kali from killing Ray. The gang flees to the hideout, and Kali insists Eleven either stay and avenge her mother or return to Hawkins. Eleven has a vision of Mike and Hopper's plight at the lab and decides to return while Kali and her gang escape from the police.
16	8	"Chapter Eight: The Mind Flayer"	The Duffer Brothers	The Duffer Brothers	October 27, 2017
The pack of Demodogs attack the lab, killing all of the scientists minus Owens. Will is sedated, after Mike deduces he is a spy, so that Will doesn't know where they are. Mike, Joyce, Hopper, Bob, Owens, and an unconscious Will escape and take refuge in a room when the power goes out. Bob leaves and manages to restore the power and open the doors. Mike, Hopper, Joyce, and Will escape, with Owens staying to guide Bob. After hiding from a Demodog, a broomstick falls to the floor, triggering a chase; Bob is killed by another Demodog. The group is rescued by Jonathan, Nancy, Steve, and the other children. At the Byers house, they name the monster the "Mind Flayer", who wants to conquer their world and kill them all. They manage to get Will to contact them in Morse code by telling him good memories of his childhood, with Will telling them to close the gate. The Mind Flayer detects where Will is and sends a Demodog. Eleven arrives, kills the Demodog with her powers, and reunites with Mike and the rest of the group.
17	9	"Chapter Nine: The Gate"	The Duffer Brothers	The Duffer Brothers	October 27, 2017
Mike is angry at Hopper for hiding Eleven from him. The group devise a plan to close the gate without killing Will. Hopper and Eleven head to the lab while Joyce, Jonathan, Nancy, and an unconscious Will go to Hopper's cabin to burn the Mind Flayer out from him, with the rest staying behind. Billy arrives looking for Max and has a fight with Steve; after Steve is knocked out by Billy, Max sedates Billy and makes him promise to leave them alone. In the cabin, Joyce, Jonathan, and Nancy turn up the heat and successfully expel the Mind Flayer out of Will. While not part of the plan, Steve, Mike, Dustin, Max, and Lucas enter the tunnels to burn the core; as they flee from the alerted Demodogs, they encounter Dart, who lets them through after Dustin gives it nougat chocolate. Hopper finds Owens injured and neutralizes the remaining Demodogs as Eleven closes the gate. A month later, Murray, Jonathan, and Nancy's tape leak causes a scandal which forces the closure of the lab, and Owens facilitates Hopper's adoption of Eleven as Jane Hopper. At the winter formal "Snow Ball", Max and Lucas dance and kiss, as do Mike and Eleven, while Nancy dances with a heartbroken Dustin. The Mind Flayer watches the group from the Upside Down.

== Production ==
=== Development ===
With the critical and viewership success of Stranger Things after its first season's release in July 2016, speculation on a possible second season was raised. The Duffer Brothers initially intended for Stranger Things to either be a standalone miniseries or an anthology series. They also considered the possibility of setting a potential second season (which they referred to as a "sequel") in the early 1990s and featuring an older version of the characters, along with all-new characters, who are drawn back to Hawkins after supernatural events begin occurring again.

However, following the release of the first season, they realized that the likability of the characters – especially the children – was key to the series' success, and they decided to set the second season in 1984 and focus on the same characters. By the end of July, the Duffer Brothers had outlined a plan for such a season if it was green-lit, and Netflix's CEO Reed Hastings said in early August that the company "would be dumb not to" renew Stranger Things for a second season. On August 31, 2016, Netflix announced it had renewed Stranger Things for a second season of nine episodes, to be released in 2017. The Duffer Brothers revealed that the series had been renewed for a second season before the first was released. Regarding the decision to wait more than a month after the first season was released to announce the renewal, Matt Duffer said, "it actually ended up working because it had built up to this fever pitch. I guess that's what [Netflix] were intending to do all the time."

=== Writing ===
The success of the first season led the Duffers to let their writers' room propose any idea they could come up with out of desperation for ways to expand the show. However, Ross Duffer stated in the WGFestival 2022 that thanks to the writers proposing more ideas than necessary, they were forced to drop some. Several of these unused ideas were later deferred to the fifth and final season. The Duffer Brothers wrote the second season to make the combined first and second season feel like a complete work, but set elements in place to go forward with additional seasons if they were green-lit. While most of the story for the second season had been decided before the first season aired, the Duffer Brothers took in the audience reactions from the first season to adjust some of the details within the second season. They knew they would not have the same element of audience surprise as when the series aired anew and were aware fans wanted to see certain elements, but Ross said "...the point is not to give everyone what they think they want. Because I don't think they really know what they want."

The Duffer Brothers felt that the second season should be treated more like a sequel rather than a continuation, and thus opted to call the second Stranger Things 2. This approach had some trepidation from Netflix, since the company felt movie sequels typically have a bad reputation, but the Duffer Brothers pointed out that there had been many successful sequels that surpassed the original film, and felt confident with this name. Despite revealing episode titles for the season in the announcement teaser in order "to provide some hint of where we were going in season two without giving anything away," Matt Duffer stated that some of the titles would change since there were some things "we didn't want to put on there because we felt like it would give too much away," and because "people are smart on the fucking internet" with fan-created "videos analyzing the chapter titles... right on a lot" of how the titles related to the plot of the season. In early October 2017, the Duffer Brothers revealed the final titles for the first six episodes of the season.

=== Casting ===
In October 2016, it was announced that Schnapp and Keery had been promoted to the main cast for the second season, after each recurring in the first season, and that Sadie Sink and Dacre Montgomery would join the main cast as Max and Billy, respectively. In order to get the role, Sink told to the crew while auditioning that she knew about rollerblading and skateboarding; Sink actually knew how to do the latter but not the former, reflecting years later during an appearance on Jimmy Kimmel Live that the two things weren't quite the same as she thought. Ryder, Harbour, Wolfhard, Brown, Matarazzo, McLaughlin, Dyer and Heaton also return for the season. Sean Astin as Bob Newby and Paul Reiser as Sam Owens are also part of the main cast in the season. For Owens, The Duffer Brothers had referred to the character in their pitch to Netflix for the season as "Paul Reiser", and specifically alluded to Reiser's character Carter J. Burke in Aliens, with Ross referencing James Cameron's casting choice for that film, saying, "[Cameron] thought people would inherently trust [Reiser] and it would be a twist". Reiser's son was a fan of Stranger Things, and gave his father an early appreciation of the series so that when the production called his agent about the role, Reiser was excited for the part. Joining them in recurring roles are Linnea Berthelsen as Kali / Eight and Brett Gelman as Murray Bauman.

=== Filming ===
In the first week of November 2016, table reads for the season started. The season was officially confirmed to be in production on November 4, 2016, in a social media post. It was accompanied by a photo of some of the cast members at a table read.

Filming of the season started on November 7, 2016. On November 14, 2016, photos of the cast on set in Atlanta were published. Seen in the photos were the main cast of kids and teens from the previous season, minus Millie Bobby Brown and Natalia Dyer, though a body double for Nancy appeared to be present. Chelsea Talmadge, who portrays the recurring character Carol, was also present. None of the new cast members were spotted, but the names Max and Billy were seen on the cast trailers, implying that newcomers Sadie Sink and Dacre Montgomery were present that day.

By early April 2017, the final two episodes had commenced filming, shooting scenes in Woodland, Georgia seen previously in season 1. Filming for the season officially wrapped on June 3, 2017.

=== Music ===
The soundtrack album for the second season was released digitally on October 20, 2017, via Lakeshore and Invada Records. The soundtrack was composed by Kyle Dixon and Michael Stein of the electronic band Survive. On the soundtrack's composition, Dixon and Stein together said that the score for the season introduces "new styles of composition, while still revisiting old themes when appropriate ... We've created new elements that are necessary to support the story, but still want to remain true to the sound of Season 1." The first track from the soundtrack, "Walkin' in Hawkins", was released on October 12.

As was customary with the first season, the second season utilized period music primarily from the 1980s to evoke a sense of nostalgia amongst viewers while further solidifying the story's setting. In all, over fifty pieces of music were used for Stranger Things 2, with release dates spanning from 1936 all the way until 1985.

== Release ==
The second season, which consisted of nine one-hour-long episodes, was released worldwide on Netflix on October 27, 2017, in Ultra HD 4K and HDR.

=== Marketing ===
A teaser for the second season, which also announced the release date, aired during Super Bowl LI.

=== Beyond Stranger Things ===
With the release of the second season of the series, Netflix also released Beyond Stranger Things, an aftershow hosted by Jim Rash. The guests of the aftershow are composed of cast and crew from the series, including the Duffer Brothers and the series' stars, to discuss the development and behind-the-scenes production of the series and its larger mythology. Unlike previous after-shows created by Embassy Row, such as Talking Dead and Talking Bad, Beyond Stranger Things is intended to be watched after a screening of the entire current season.

=== Home media ===
The second season was released on a Blu-ray/DVD combo pack exclusively to Target retailers on November 6, 2018, in vintage CBS-FOX VHS-inspired packaging.

Stranger Things 2
Set details	Special features	
Format: AC-3, Blu-ray, DTS Surround Sound, Dubbed, NTSC, Subtitled, Widescreen * Language/Subtitles: English, Spanish * 2:1 aspect ratio * 6-disc set, 9 episodes	Collectible behind-the-scenes postcards show a candid, behind-the-scenes looks at the making of Stranger Things 2. * Retro packaging designed to look like a vintage CBS-FOX VHS cassette tape.	
DVD release dates
Region 1	Region 2	Region 4
November 6, 2018	TBA	TBA

== Reception ==
=== Audience viewership ===
==== Nielsen ratings ====
Nielsen ratings records viewership data for those who viewed the series on a TV set, the data does not account for mobile, tablet or PC devices.

Nielsen ratings
No.	Title	Release date	Three day viewership		Refs
No.	Title	Release date	18-49 viewers (millions)	Total viewers (millions)	Refs
1	"Chapter One: MADMAX"	October 27, 2017	11.0	15.8	
2	"Chapter Two: Trick or Treat, Freak"	October 27, 2017	9.6	13.7	
3	"Chapter Three: The Pollywog"	October 27, 2017	8.1	11.6	
4	"Chapter Four: Will the Wise"	October 27, 2017	6.6	9.3	
5	"Chapter Five: Dig Dug"	October 27, 2017	5.6	8.0	
6	"Chapter Six: The Spy"	October 27, 2017	4.5	6.4	
7	"Chapter Seven: The Lost Sister"	October 27, 2017	3.7	5.3	
8	"Chapter Eight: The Mind Flayer"	October 27, 2017	3.4	4.9	
9	"Chapter Nine: The Gate"	October 27, 2017	3.2	4.6	

==== Other data ====
The second season has been recognized by Parrot Analytics as the most in-demand digital original series of the world in 2017 and is included in the 2019 edition of Guinness World Records. In August 2017, the marketing analytics firm Jumpshot determined the season was the seventh-most viewed Netflix season in the first 30 days after it was released, garnering slightly more than 20% of the viewers that the second season of Daredevil received, which was the most viewed season according to Jumpshot. Jumpshot, which "analyzes click-stream data from an online panel of more than 100 million consumers", looked at the viewing behavior and activity of the company's U.S. members, factoring in the relative number of U.S. Netflix viewers who watched at least one episode of the season.

=== Critical response ===
On Rotten Tomatoes, the second season has an approval rating of 94% based on 151 reviews and an average rating of 7.8/10. The site's critical consensus states, "Stranger Things' slow-building sophomore season balances moments of humor and a nostalgic sweetness against a growing horror that's all the more effective thanks to the show's full-bodied characters and evocative tone." On Metacritic, the second season has a normalized score of 78 out of 100, based on 33 critics, indicating "generally favorable" reviews.

In a review for Rolling Stone, journalist David Fear praised the second season's character development, going so far as to say it shined more than the narrative: "...By the time you get to the John Hughes finale, in which the school's winter dance ties up numerous loose ends, you realize that Stranger Things 2 has not only been crafting a story about kids fumbling through and finding their way into young adulthood, but that those parts feel more interesting than any Upside Down, et al. shenanigans ... if the second season has anything on the first, it's that these characters now feel less like they stepped out of E.T. outtakes and more like the actual teens who were in the audience watching it and dreaming."

Linda Holmes of National Public Radio also praised the season's character development, saying in her review, "There is much to be grateful for in the work given to the returning cast. Dustin and Lucas have the opportunity to be fleshed out a bit more — which is especially welcome with Lucas, who wasn't given a lot of solo time in the first season to demonstrate exactly what role he plays in what Dustin calls the "party" made up of the boys and Eleven. Perhaps the most unexpectedly successful move on this front, though, is to continue to build out Steve beyond Obstacle Boyfriend, in part by giving him some contact with people besides Nancy to work with." Holmes also expressed misgiving, noting that the narrative structure was at times copying from the first season's plot line, but overall found this iteration to be enjoyable despite its shortcomings.

=== Commentary ===
One of the most notable impacts of the series has been an increased demand for Eggo waffles, as they are shown to be Eleven's favorite food in several episodes and are seen as a representation of the series. The Kellogg Company, which manufactures Eggo, had not been part of the production prior to the first season's release, but recognized the market impact of the series. It provided a vintage 1980s Eggo television advertisement for Netflix to use in its season two Super Bowl LI commercial, and is looking to become more involved with cross-promotion.
