= Stranger Things =

American television series (2016–2025)

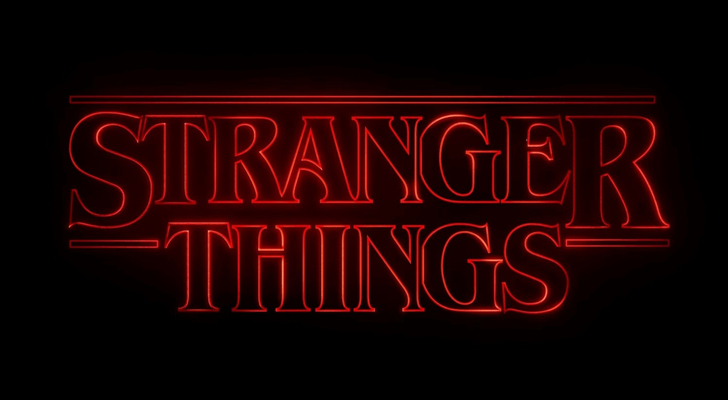
- Genre: Science fiction; Horror; Mystery; Drama; Supernatural; Epic; Coming-of-age
- Created by: The Duffer Brothers
- Showrunners: Karl Gajdusek; Matt Duffer; Ross Duffer
- Starring: Winona Ryder; David Harbour; Finn Wolfhard; Millie Bobby Brown; Gaten Matarazzo; Caleb McLaughlin; Natalia Dyer; Charlie Heaton; Cara Buono; Matthew Modine; Noah Schnapp; Sadie Sink; Joe Keery; Dacre Montgomery; Sean Astin; Paul Reiser; Maya Hawke; Priah Ferguson; Brett Gelman; Linda Hamilton; Jamie Campbell Bower; Nell Fisher
- Composers: Michael Stein; Kyle Dixon
- Country of origin: United States
- Original language: English
- No. of seasons: 5
- No. of episodes: 42 (list of episodes)

Production
- Executive producers: Karl Gajdusek; Cindy Holland; Brian Wright; Matt Thunell; Shawn Levy; Dan Cohen; The Duffer Brothers; Iain Paterson; Curtis Gwinn
- Producer: Lampton Enochs
- Cinematography: Tim Ives; Tod Campbell; David Franco; Lachlan Milne; Ricardo Diaz; Caleb Heymann; Brett Jutkiewicz
- Editors: Dean Zimmerman; Kevin D. Ross; Nat Fuller; Katheryn Naranjo; Casey Cichocki
- Running time: 42–142 minutes
- Production companies: 21 Laps Entertainment; Monkey Massacre Productions (seasons 1–4); Upside Down Pictures (season 5)
- Budget: $870–950 million

Original release
- Network: Netflix
- Release: July 15, 2016 – December 31, 2025

Related
- Stranger Things: Tales from '85; Stranger Things franchise

Stranger Things is an American television series created by the Duffer Brothers for Netflix. Produced by Monkey Massacre Productions and 21 Laps Entertainment, the first season was released on Netflix on July 15, 2016. The second and third seasons followed in October 2017 and July 2019, respectively, and the fourth season was released in two volumes in May and July 2022. The fifth and final season was released in three volumes, including the finale, in November and December 2025. The show combines elements of horror, science fiction, mystery, coming-of-age, supernatural, and drama.

Set in the 1980s, the series centers on the residents of the fictional town of Hawkins, Indiana, after a young girl with psychokinetic abilities named Eleven inadvertently creates a wormhole known as the Upside Down at a nearby secretive government research facility, connecting Earth to a hostile realm called the Abyss. The ensemble cast includes Winona Ryder, David Harbour, Finn Wolfhard, Millie Bobby Brown, Gaten Matarazzo, Caleb McLaughlin, Natalia Dyer, Charlie Heaton, Cara Buono, Matthew Modine, Noah Schnapp, Sadie Sink, Joe Keery, Dacre Montgomery, Sean Astin, Paul Reiser, Maya Hawke, Priah Ferguson, Brett Gelman, Linda Hamilton, Jamie Campbell Bower, and Nell Fisher.

The Duffer Brothers developed Stranger Things as a blend of investigative drama and supernatural horror, infused with childlike wonder and references to the popular culture of the 1980s. Several thematic and directorial elements were inspired by the works of Steven Spielberg, John Carpenter, David Lynch, Stephen King, Wes Craven, H. P. Lovecraft, and FromSoftware. The show also drew inspiration from Cold War-era experiments and conspiracy theories involving secret government programs.

Stranger Things has received positive reviews throughout its run, with praise for its characterization, atmosphere, acting, direction, writing, and homage to 1980s cinema, making it a touchstone of 1980s nostalgia. It is a flagship series for Netflix, drawing record viewership with each season's release and garnering numerous accolades. The series has expanded into a media franchise, including the spin-off series Tales from '85 (2026) and Other Worlds (2028), and a stage play, The First Shadow (2023). It has also inspired several books, comics, tie-in media, a pop-up shop, and a Dungeons & Dragons role-playing starter set game based on the series.

== Overview ==
Stranger Things takes place in the 1980s, with the main setting being the fictional rural town of Hawkins, Indiana, described as "the town where nothing ever happens". The nearby Hawkins National Laboratory ostensibly performs scientific research for the United States Department of Energy, but also secretly experiments with the paranormal and supernatural, sometimes with human test subjects. They inadvertently create a portal to an alternate dimension referred to as the Upside Down, whose presence begins to affect the residents of Hawkins in unusual ways.

The first season begins on November 6, 1983, when Will Byers is abducted by a creature from the Upside Down, dubbed the "Demogorgon". His mother Joyce, police chief Jim Hopper, and a group of volunteers search for him. A young psychokinetic girl named Eleven escapes from Hawkins Lab and is found by Will's friends, Mike Wheeler, Dustin Henderson, and Lucas Sinclair. Eleven befriends and assists them in their efforts to find Will. Mike's older sister Nancy and Will's older brother Jonathan learn about the Demogorgon and the existence of the Upside Down. Will is eventually found alive, while Eleven disappears after killing the Demogorgon.

The second season is set 11 months later, between October and November 1984. Joyce is dating her former classmate Bob Newby, but they discover that Will is still affected by a shadowy entity from the Upside Down. Will's friends and family learn that anything connected to the Upside Down is part of a hive mind known as the Mind Flayer. Lucas earns the affection of a new classmate, Max Mayfield, while Dustin teams up with Nancy's ex-boyfriend Steve Harrington to fend off a horde of adolescent Demogorgons, which was dubbed "Demodogs". Later, other Demodogs kill Bob in Hawkins Laboratory and threaten the rest of the group. Eleven reappears and closes the gate to the Upside Down underneath Hawkins Laboratory.

The third season is set nine months later, in the days leading up to the Fourth of July celebrations in 1985. The new Starcourt Mall becomes the center of attention for Hawkins residents. Hopper adopts Eleven and becomes increasingly concerned about her relationship with Mike. Dustin, Steve and his coworker Robin Buckley, and Lucas's younger sister Erica discover that a secret Soviet laboratory beneath Starcourt is attempting to reopen the gateway to the Upside Down. Meanwhile, the Mind Flayer possesses Max's stepbrother, Billy Hargrove, and begins creating physical vessels made of melted flesh to carry out its will. Eleven loses her powers, Billy dies, and Hopper seemingly dies when the Soviets' gate is closed.

The fourth season is set eight months later, in March 1986. The Byers family and Eleven have moved to Lenora, California for a fresh start. In Hawkins, three teenagers are murdered by the Mind Flayer's partner and Hawkins Laboratory's first test subject—later dubbed Vecna—to open gates between Hawkins and the Upside Down. Dustin's friend Eddie Munson is scapegoated for the murders while Vecna targets Max as his fourth victim. To help Eleven regain her powers, Dr. Sam Owens takes her to a secure facility. Joyce and Murray Bauman learn that Hopper survived but was captured by Soviets, so they rescue him from a gulag in the Kamchatka Peninsula. Eleven regains her powers, but Eddie dies, Max is rendered comatose, and rifts open throughout Hawkins.

The fifth and final season is primarily set in November 1987. The military puts Hawkins under quarantine and hunts for Eleven, while the group tracks down Vecna until he kidnaps Nancy and Mike's younger sister, Holly, alongside 11 other children. The Upside Down is discovered to be a wormhole between Hawkins and another dimension known as the Abyss; Vecna plans to use the children to merge the Abyss with Hawkins. The group ultimately rescues the captured children, kills Vecna and the Mind Flayer, and destroys the Upside Down. To prevent the military from creating new psychic test subjects with her blood, Eleven seemingly stays behind in the collapsing Upside Down. 18 months later, in May 1989, Mike, Will, Dustin, Lucas, and Max graduate from high school, and Hopper proposes to Joyce. Mike theorizes that Eleven faked her death, and the rest of the group chooses to believe him.

== Cast and characters ==
- Winona Ryder as Joyce Byers, the mother of Will and Jonathan Byers. She is divorced from their father, Lonnie Byers. Protective and strong-willed, she becomes determined to find Will after he goes missing, convinced that his disappearance is paranormal in nature.
- David Harbour as Jim Hopper, the chief of Hawkins Police Department. After his young daughter Sara died of cancer, Hopper divorced and lapsed into alcoholism. He becomes more responsible, helping Joyce investigate the truth behind Will's disappearance, and adopting Eleven as his daughter. He and Joyce have feelings for each other.
- Finn Wolfhard as Mike Wheeler, middle child and the only son of Karen and Ted Wheeler, brother of Nancy and Holly, and one of Will Byers's three close friends. He is an intelligent and conscientious student and is committed to his friends. He develops romantic feelings for Eleven and later dates her.
- Millie Bobby Brown as Jane "El" Hopper (née Ives) / Eleven, a girl with telepathic and psychokinetic abilities as a result of being one of Dr. Brenner's subjects from Hawkins National Laboratory. She escapes the lab and eventually becomes an adoptive daughter to Jim Hopper and takes his surname, and adjusts to living a normal life with the help of Mike (whom she later dates) and his friends.
- Gaten Matarazzo as Dustin Henderson, one of Will Byers's friends. His cleidocranial dysplasia causes him to lisp. In the second season, he is proud of his new front teeth and is attracted to Max. In season three, he gets a girlfriend, Suzie, who he met at summer camp.
- Caleb McLaughlin as Lucas Sinclair, one of Will's friends. He is wary of Eleven but later befriends her. In season two, he is one of Max's love interests and eventually becomes her boyfriend. In season four, he becomes more popular at school after joining the Hawkins High basketball team, which briefly puts him at odds with his regular friend group.
- Natalia Dyer as Nancy Wheeler, daughter of Karen and Ted and older sister of Mike and Holly. Studious and rule-abiding, Nancy finds another side of herself while investigating Hawkins Lab and the death of her friend Barbara. In the first two seasons, she is the girlfriend of Steve Harrington, but breaks up with him and then dates Jonathan Byers. She is an aspiring journalist.
- Charlie Heaton as Jonathan Byers, the older brother of Will Byers and the son of Joyce Byers. He is a quiet and kind-hearted teenager, an outsider at school, and an aspiring photographer. He is close with his mother and brother, and he becomes the boyfriend of Nancy Wheeler.
- Cara Buono as Karen Wheeler (seasons 1–3 and 5; also starring: season 4), mother of Nancy, Mike, and Holly, who is mostly unaware of her children's activities for much of the series.
- Matthew Modine as Dr. Martin Brenner (seasons 1 and 4; recurring: season 2), the scientist in charge of Hawkins Laboratory and training Eleven. Manipulative and remote, he and his team search for Eleven in season one after she escapes. He is referred to as "Papa" by Eleven. In season four, he returns to help Eleven regain her powers and protect her from the government agents hunting her down.
- Noah Schnapp as Will Byers (seasons 2–5; also starring: season 1), the son of Joyce Byers and younger brother of Jonathan Byers. He is captured by a monster from the Upside Down in season one. He later develops a connection to the Upside Down and the Mind Flayer due to his capture. He struggles with his sexuality and comes out as gay in season five.
- Sadie Sink as Max Mayfield (seasons 2–5), Billy's younger stepsister and a tomboy who catches the attention of both Lucas and Dustin, eventually dating Lucas. In season four, she becomes one of the teens targeted by Vecna.
- Joe Keery as Steve Harrington (seasons 2–5; also starring: season 1), a popular high school student and the boyfriend of Nancy Wheeler. He ostracizes Jonathan Byers but later befriends him. He and Nancy break up in season two but remain friends. He is known as the "babysitter" of the group, often left to look after the kids, particularly Dustin, with whom he forms a strong rapport.
- Dacre Montgomery as Billy Hargrove (seasons 2–3; also starring: season 4), Max's violent, unpredictable, and abusive older stepbrother. He challenges Steve's popularity. In season three, he is controlled by the Mind Flayer and dies in the process.
- Sean Astin as Bob Newby (season 2; guest: season 3), a former schoolmate of Joyce and Hopper who runs the Hawkins RadioShack. He is Joyce's boyfriend, putting him at odds with Hopper. He dies after being attacked by creatures from the Upside Down.
- Paul Reiser as Dr. Sam Owens (seasons 2 and 4; guest: season 3), a Department of Energy executive who replaces Brenner as director of Hawkins Laboratory. He is committed to scientific research yet empathetic to the residents of Hawkins, and he helps Hopper adopt Eleven as his legal daughter. He returns with Brenner in season four to help Eleven regain her powers and to protect her from government agents hunting her.
- Maya Hawke as Robin Buckley (seasons 3–5), Steve's co-worker at Starcourt Mall's Scoops Ahoy ice cream shop, who later comes out as a lesbian. Becoming close friends, she and Steve work together at Scoops Ahoy and later at Family Video. In season five, she begins dating her classmate Vickie, a volunteer nurse.
- Priah Ferguson as Erica Sinclair (seasons 3–5; recurring: season 2), Lucas's younger sister who helps the group. She is very smart and has an avid interest in D&D.
- Brett Gelman as Murray Bauman (seasons 4–5; also starring: seasons 2–3), a conspiracy theorist, private investigator, and old acquaintance of Hopper who assists Nancy and Jonathan, and later Hopper and Joyce.
- Linda Hamilton as Dr. Kay (season 5), the sinister leader of the military unit dispatched to Hawkins after the opening of rifts to the Upside Down. She oversees a research base installed within the Upside Down itself.
- Jamie Campbell Bower as Henry Creel / One / Vecna / Mr. Whatsit (season 5; also starring: season 4), a murderous psychic being from the Upside Down. Having attained supernatural abilities as a child, he murdered his family and was subsequently placed under Brenner's care. Flashbacks in season four reveal that an eight-year-old Eleven banished him to another dimension, where he was disfigured and joined the Mind Flayer's hive mind.
- Nell Fisher (season 5) (Note: Fisher is credited under the "also starring" bill for all episodes of season five except the final episode, where she is credited as part of the main cast.) and Anniston and Tinsley Price (recurring: seasons 1–4) as Holly Wheeler, Nancy and Mike's younger sister and Karen's youngest child.

== Episodes ==
Season	Episodes		Originally released
1	8		July 15, 2016
2	9		October 27, 2017
3	8		July 4, 2019
4	9	7	May 27, 2022
4	9	2	July 1, 2022
5	8	4	November 26, 2025
5	8	3	December 25, 2025
5	8	1	December 31, 2025

== Production ==
=== Development ===
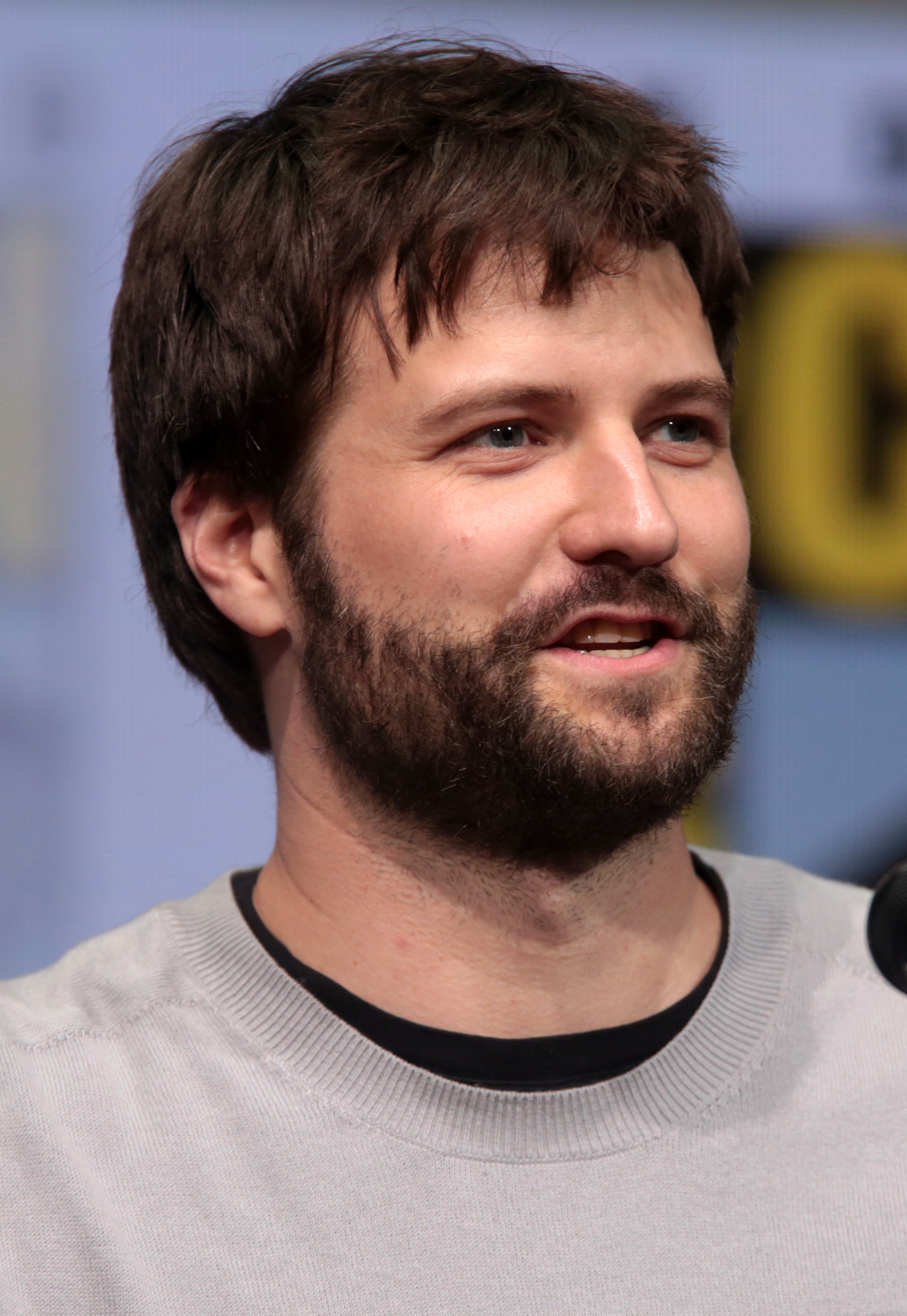
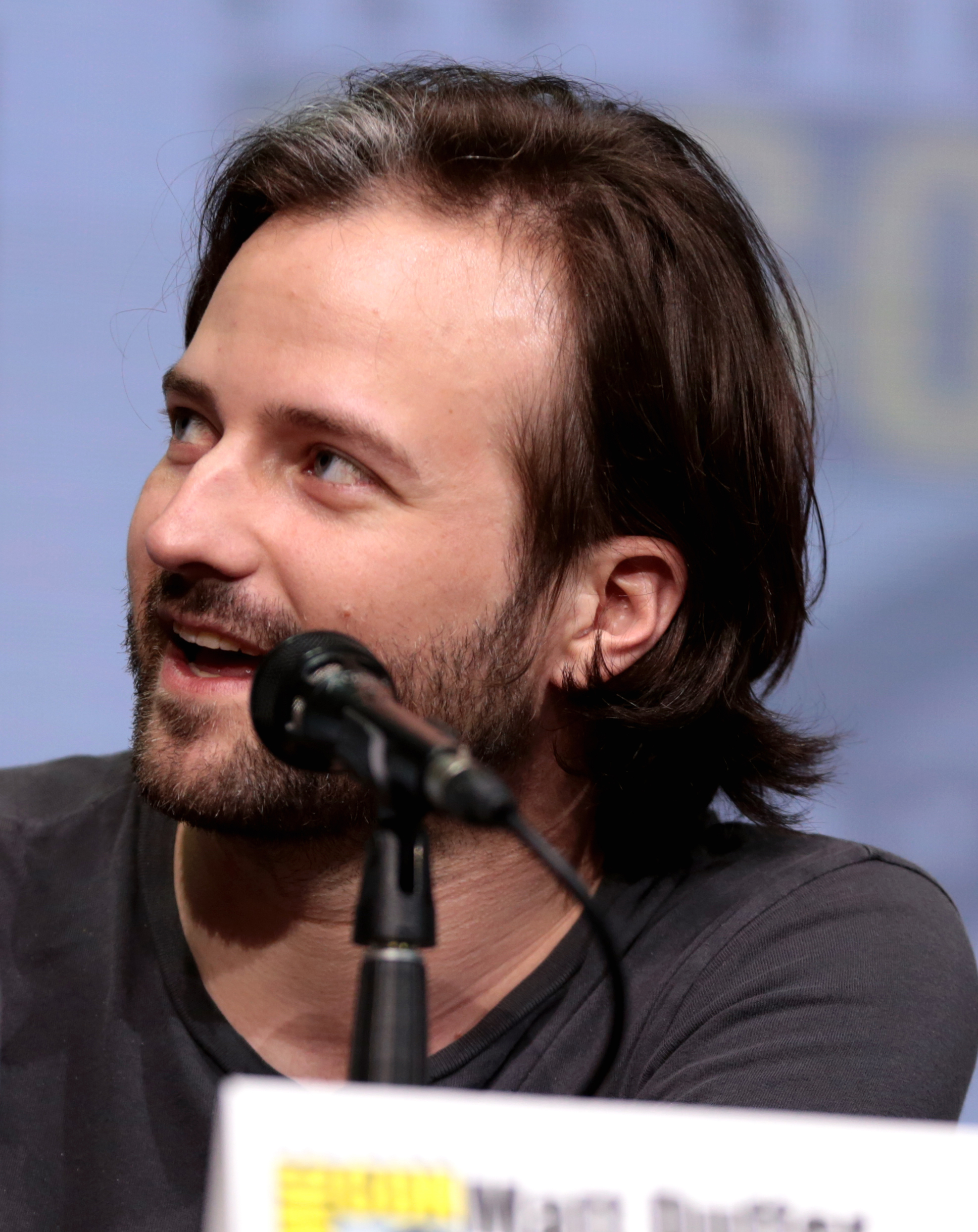
Ross (left) and Matt Duffer, the creators and showrunners of the series

Stranger Things was created by Matt and Ross Duffer, known professionally as the Duffer Brothers, who also serve as showrunners and head writers and direct many of the episodes. They wrote and produced their 2015 film Hidden, in which they emulated the style of M. Night Shyamalan. However, due to changes at Warner Bros., its distributor, it did not see wide release and the Duffers were unsure of their future. To their surprise, television producer Donald De Line approached them, impressed with Hidden's script, and offered them the opportunity to work on episodes of Wayward Pines with Shyamalan. The brothers were mentored by Shyamalan during the episode's production so that when they finished, they felt they were ready to produce their own television series.

The Duffers prepared a script similar to the series' eventual pilot episode, along with a 20-page pitch book to help shop the series to networks. They pitched the story to about 15 cable networks, all of whom felt a plot with children as leading characters would not work and asked the brothers to either make it a children's series or drop the children and focus on Hopper's investigation into the paranormal.

In early 2015, Dan Cohen, the VP of 21 Laps Entertainment, brought the script to his colleague Shawn Levy. They subsequently invited the Duffer Brothers to their office and purchased the rights for the series, giving the brothers full authorship. After reading the pilot, the streaming service Netflix purchased the whole season for an undisclosed sum, and in April of the same year, the series was announced for a 2016 release.

The Duffer Brothers stated that at the time they pitched to Netflix, the company had already been recognized for its original programming in shows such as House of Cards and Orange Is the New Black, with well-recognized producers behind them, and were ready to start giving upcoming producers like them a chance. The brothers started casting and brought Levy and Cohen in as the other executive producers to discuss storylines, with Levy also directing for the show.

Montauk is an eight-hour sci-fi horror epic. Set in Long Island in 1980 and inspired by the supernatural classics of that era, we explore the crossroads where the ordinary meet the extraordinary...emotional, cinematic, and rooted in character, Montauk is a love letter to the golden age of Steven Spielberg and Stephen King – a marriage of human drama and supernatural fear.

— The Duffer Brothers' original pitch for Montauk

The book cover the Duffer Brothers created to pitch Montauk. For this, they took inspiration from Stephen King book covers such as Firestarter.

The series was originally known as Montauk. The setting was then Montauk, New York, and nearby Long Island locations. Montauk figured into several real-world conspiracy theories involving secret government experiments. The brothers had chosen Montauk as it had further Spielberg ties with the film Jaws, where Montauk was used for the fictional setting of Amity Island. After deciding to change the narrative of the series to take place in the fictional town of Hawkins instead, the brothers felt they could now do things to the town, such as placing it under quarantine, that they really could not envision with a real location.

With the location change, they had to come up with a new title for the series under direction from Netflix's Ted Sarandos, so that they could start marketing it to the public. The brothers started by using a copy of Stephen King's Firestarter novel to consider the title's font and appearance, and came up with a long list of potential alternatives. Stranger Things came about as it sounded similar to another King novel, Needful Things, though Matt noted they still had a "lot of heated arguments" over this final title.

To pitch the series, the Duffer Brothers showcased images, footage and music from classic 1970s and 1980s films such as E.T. the Extra-Terrestrial, Close Encounters of the Third Kind, Poltergeist, Hellraiser, Stand by Me, Firestarter, A Nightmare on Elm Street and Jaws, to establish the tone of the series.

=== Writing ===
The idea of Stranger Things started with how the brothers felt they could take the concept of the 2013 film Prisoners, detailing the moral struggles a father goes through when his daughter is kidnapped, and expand it out over eight or so hours in a serialized television approach. As they focused on the missing child aspect of the story, they wanted to introduce the idea of "childlike sensibilities" they could offer, and toyed around with the idea of a monster that could consume humans. The brothers thought the combination of these things "was the best thing ever".

To introduce this monster into the narrative, they considered "bizarre experiments we had read about taking place in the Cold War" such as MKUltra, which gave a way to ground the monster's existence in science rather than something spiritual. This also helped them to decide on using 1983 as the time period, as it was a year before the film Red Dawn came out, which focused on Cold War paranoia. Subsequently, they were able to use all their own personal inspirations from the 1980s, the decade in which they were born, as elements of the series, crafting it in the realm of science fiction and horror.

Other influences cited by the Duffers include: Stephen King novels; films produced by Steven Spielberg, John Carpenter, David Lynch, Wes Craven, and Guillermo del Toro; films such as Star Wars, Alien, and Stand by Me; Japanese anime such as Akira and Elfen Lied; and several video games including Silent Hill, Dark Souls and The Last of Us. The Duffers believe that they may have brought influences from other works unintentionally, including Beyond the Black Rainbow and D.A.R.Y.L., discovered by reviewing fan feedback on the series. Several websites and publications have found other pop culture references in the series, particularly references to 1980s pop culture. The primary antagonist for the final two seasons, Vecna, was inspired by the villains that scared the brothers when they watched the movies and miniseries as children: Freddy Krueger, Pinhead, and Pennywise.

With Netflix as the platform, the Duffers were not limited to a typical 22-episode format, opting for the eight-episode approach. They had been concerned that a 22-episode season on broadcast television would make it difficult to "tell a cinematic story". Eight episodes allowed them to give time to characterization in addition to narrative development; if they had less time available, they would have had to remain committed to telling a horror film as soon as the monster was introduced and abandon the characterization. Within the eight episodes, the brothers aimed to make the first season "feel like a big movie" with all the major plot lines completed so that "the audience feels satisfied", but left enough unresolved to indicate "there's a bigger mythology, and there's a lot of dangling threads at the end", something that could be explored in further seasons if Netflix chose to greenlight more.

Regarding writing for the children characters of the series, the Duffers considered themselves outcasts from other students while in high school and thus found it easy to write for Mike and his friends, and particularly for Barb. Joyce was fashioned after Richard Dreyfuss' character Roy Neary in the 1977 film Close Encounters of the Third Kind, as she appears "absolutely bonkers" to everyone else as she tries to find Will.

=== Casting ===
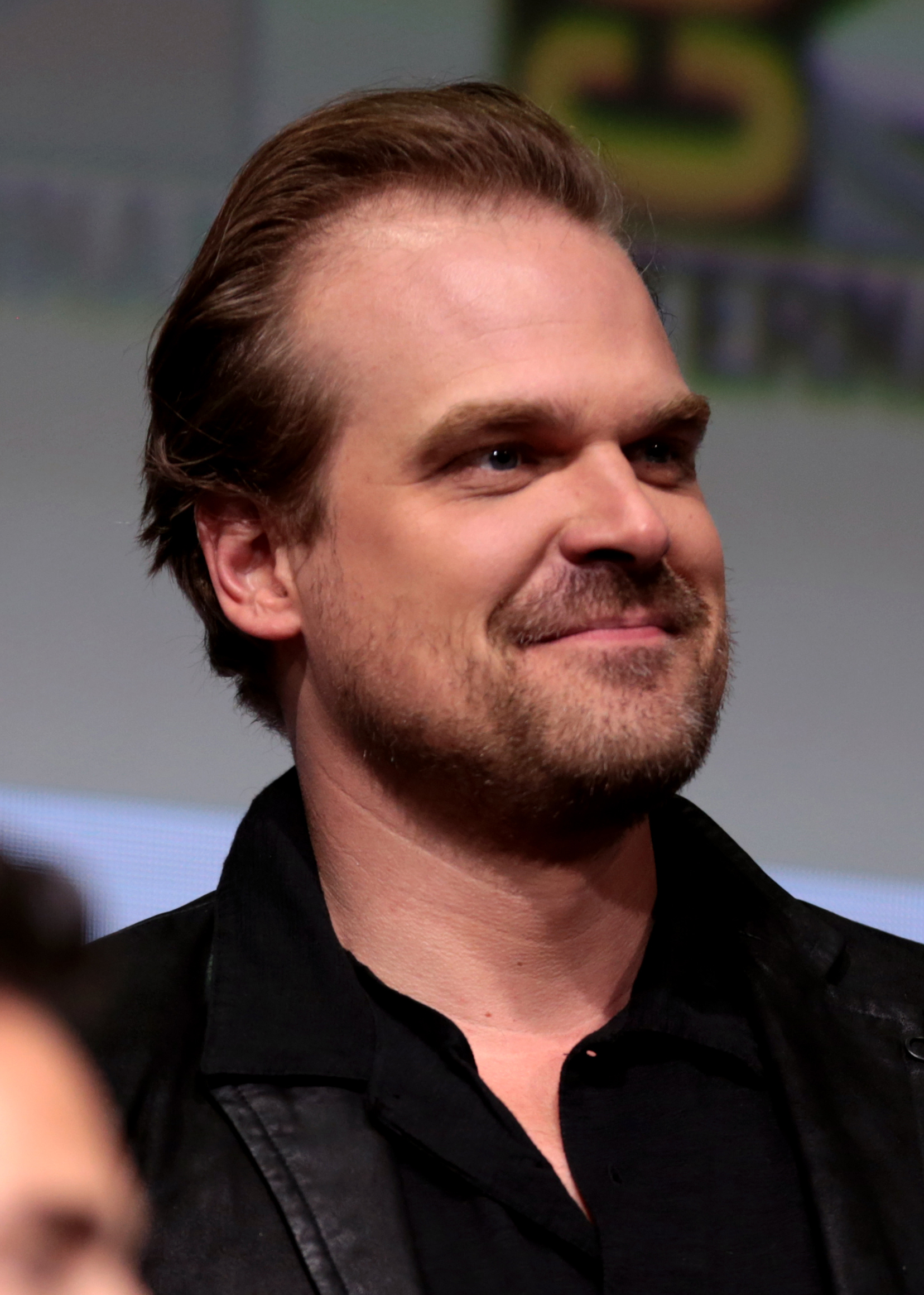
The Duffer Brothers cast David Harbour as Chief Hopper, believing this was his opportunity to portray a lead character.

In June 2015, it was announced that Winona Ryder and David Harbour had been cast as Joyce and the unnamed chief of police, respectively. Ryder's sole condition to the Duffers in accepting the part was that, if a sequel to Beetlejuice (1988) ever materialized as she and Tim Burton had been discussing since 2000, they had to let her take a break to shoot it, a condition the Duffers agreed and ultimately proved to work out when Beetlejuice Beetlejuice (2024) was greenlit. The brothers' casting director Carmen Cuba had suggested Ryder for the role of Joyce, which the two were immediately drawn to because of her predominance in 1980s films.

Levy believed Ryder could "wretch up the emotional urgency and yet find layers and nuance and different sides of [Joyce]". Ryder praised that the show's multiple storylines required her to act for Joyce as if "she's out of her mind, but she's actually kind of onto something", and that the producers had faith she could pull off the difficult role. The Duffer Brothers had been interested in Harbour before, who until Stranger Things primarily had smaller roles as villainous characters, and they felt that he had been "waiting too long for this opportunity" to play a lead, while Harbour himself was thrilled by the script and the chance to play "a broken, flawed, anti-hero character". Billy Crudup was the first choice for the role, but he passed on it.

Additional casting followed two months later with Finn Wolfhard as Mike, Millie Bobby Brown in an undisclosed role, Gaten Matarazzo as Dustin, Caleb McLaughlin as Lucas, Natalia Dyer as Nancy, and Charlie Heaton as Jonathan. In September 2015, Cara Buono joined the cast as Karen, followed by Matthew Modine as Martin Brenner a month later. Additional cast who recur in the first season include Noah Schnapp as Will, Shannon Purser as Barbara "Barb" Holland, Joe Keery as Steve Harrington, and Ross Partridge as Lonnie.

Actors auditioning for the children's roles read lines from Stand by Me. The Duffers estimated they went through about a thousand different child actors for the roles. They noted that Wolfhard was already "a movie buff" of the films from the 1980s period and easily filled the role, while they found Matarazzo's audition to be much more authentic than most of the other audition tapes, and selected him after a single viewing of his audition tape.

As casting had begun immediately after Netflix greenlit the series, and prior to the scripts being fully completed, this allowed some of the actors' takes on the roles to reflect on the script. The casting of the young actors for Will and his friends had been done just after the first script was completed, and subsequent scripts incorporated aspects from these actors. The brothers said Modine provided significant input on the character of Dr. Brenner, whom they had not really fleshed out before, as they considered him the hardest character to write for given his limited appearances within the narrative.

=== Filming ===
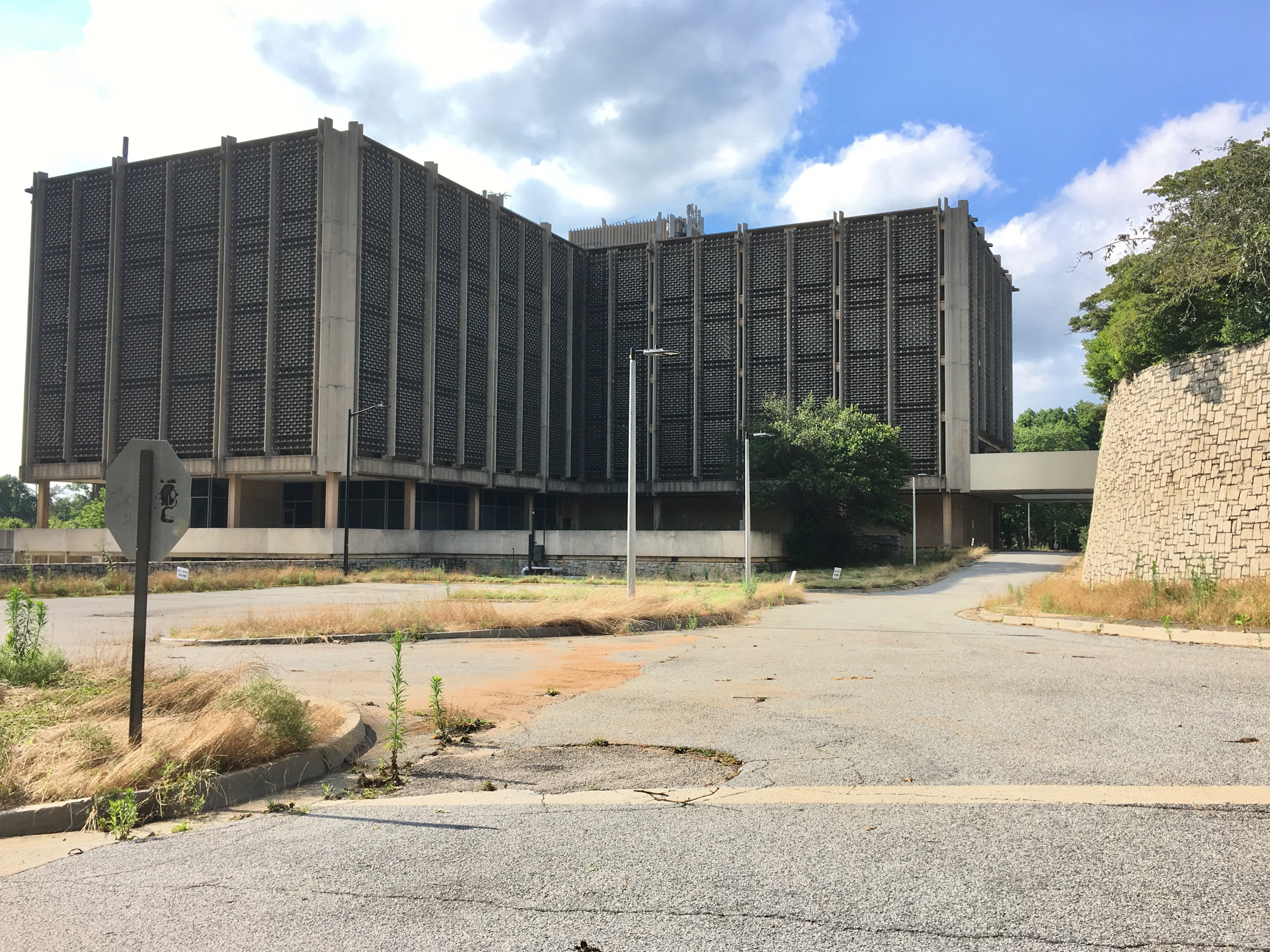
Emory University's former Georgia Mental Health Institute served as the location of Hawkins National Laboratory.

The brothers had desired to film the series around the Long Island area to match the initial Montauk concept. However, with filming scheduled to take place in November 2015, it was difficult to shoot in Long Island in the cold weather, and the production started scouting locations in and around the Atlanta, Georgia, area. The brothers, who grew up in North Carolina, found many places that reminded them of their own childhoods in that area, and felt the area would work well with the narrative shift to the fictional town of Hawkins, Indiana.

Filming for the first season began in November 2015 and was extensively done in Atlanta, Georgia, with the Duffer Brothers and Levy handling the direction of individual episodes. Jackson served as the basis of the fictional town of Hawkins, Indiana. Other shooting locations included the Georgia Mental Health Institute as the Hawkins National Laboratory site, Bellwood Quarry, and Patrick Henry High School in Stockbridge, Georgia, for the middle and high school scenes.

Filming locations included Emory University's Continuing Education Department, the former city hall in Douglasville, Georgia, the Georgia International Horse Park in Conyers, Georgia, the probate court in Butts County, Georgia, Old East Point Library and East Point First Baptist Church in East Point, Georgia, Fayetteville, Georgia, Stone Mountain Park, Palmetto, Georgia, and Winston, Georgia. Set work was done at Screen Gem Studios in Atlanta and the first season was filmed with a RED Epic Dragon camera. Filming for the first season concluded in early 2016.

After the third season finished filming, producers considered the idea of keeping the Starcourt Mall set as a permanent attraction for fans to visit, but ultimately decided against it.

Filming for the fourth season was slated to begin in January 2020 and to last through August. With the release of a February 2020 teaser for the season, the Duffers confirmed that production had started. Some filming for the fourth season took place at Lukiškės Prison and nearby in Vilnius, Lithuania. In March 2020, production was stopped due to the COVID-19 pandemic, and resumed that September.

Filming for the fifth and final season was expected to start in June 2023, before the 2023 Writers Guild of America strike delayed it to January 8, 2024. Production began on that day and wrapped on December 20.

=== Visual effects ===
To create the aged effect for the series, a film grain was added over the footage, which was captured by scanning in film stock from the 1980s. The Duffer Brothers wanted to scare the audience, but not to necessarily make the series violent or gory, following in line with how the 1980s Amblin Entertainment films drove the creation of the PG-13 movie rating. They said such films were "much more about mood and atmosphere and suspense and dread than they are about gore", though they were not afraid to push into more scary elements, particularly towards the end of the first season.

The brothers had wanted to avoid any computer-generated effects for the monster and other parts of the series and stay with practical effects, so they created an animatronic to play the part of the Demogorgon. However, the six-month filming time left them little time to plan out and test practical effects rigs for some of the shots. They went with a middle ground of using constructed props, including one for the monster whenever they could, but for other shots, such as when the monster bursts through a wall, they opted to use digital effects. Post-production on the first season was completed the week before it was released to Netflix.

The title sequence uses close-ups of the letters in the Stranger Things title with a red tint against a black background as they slide into place within the title. The sequence was created by the studio Imaginary Forces, formerly part of R/GA, led by creative director Michelle Doughtey. Levy introduced the studio to the Duffer Brothers, who explained their vision of the 1980s-inspired series, which helped the studio to fix the concept the producers wanted. Later, but before filming, the producers sent Imaginary Forces the pilot script, the synth-heavy background music for the titles, as well as the various book covers from King and other authors that they had used to establish the title and imagery, and were looking for a similar approach for the series' titles, primarily using a typographical sequence.

They took inspiration from several title sequences of works from the 1980s that were previously designed by Richard Greenberg under R/GA, such as Altered States and The Dead Zone. They also got input from Dan Perri, who worked on the title credits of several 1980s films. Various iterations included having letters vanish, to reflect the "missing" theme of the series, and having letters cast shadows on others, alluding to the mysteries, before settling into the sliding letters. The studio began working on the title sequence before filming, and took about a month off during the filming process to let the producers get immersed in the series and come back with more input.

Initially, they had been working with various fonts for the title and used close-ups of the best features of these fonts, but near the end, the producers wanted to work with ITC Benguiat, requiring them to rework those shots. The final sequence is fully computer-generated, but they took inspiration from testing some practical effects, such as using Kodalith masks as would have been done in the 1980s, to develop the appropriate filters for the rendering software. The individual episode title cards used a "fly through" approach, similar to the film Bullitt, which the producers had suggested to the studio.

=== Music ===
Michael Stein and Kyle Dixon of the electronic band Survive have composed the original soundtrack for the show, including the show's theme song. It makes extensive use of synthesizers in homage to 1980s artists and film composers including Jean-Michel Jarre, Tangerine Dream, Vangelis, Goblin, John Carpenter, Giorgio Moroder, and Fabio Frizzi. According to Stein and Dixon, the Duffer Brothers had been fans of Survive's music since the 2014 film The Guest. Once the series was green-lit, the Duffer Brothers contacted Survive around July 2015 to ask if they were still doing music; the two provided the production team with dozens of songs from their band's past to gain their interest, helping to land them the role.

In addition to original music, Stranger Things features period music from artists including Joy Division, Toto, New Order, the Bangles, Foreigner, Bon Jovi, The Police, Echo and the Bunnymen, Peter Gabriel, Madonna, Prince, Iron Maiden, and Corey Hart, as well as excerpts from Tangerine Dream, John Carpenter, and Vangelis. Some songs have been used as narrative elements, such as The Clash's "Should I Stay or Should I Go" within the first season, and Kate Bush's "Running Up That Hill" in the fourth and fifth seasons. Some of these licensed songs saw subsequent resurgence on sales charts after the respective seasons they featured in aired, most notably "Running Up That Hill" and Metallica's "Master of Puppets" in the fourth season, and Limahl's "The NeverEnding Story" in the third season.

Soundtracks containing the original compositions and the licensed music for each season have been released by Lakeshore Records, with the exception of the licensed music for the fifth season, which was released via Legacy Recordings.

== Release ==
The first season consisted of eight episodes which were released worldwide on Netflix on July 15, 2016, in Ultra HD 4K. The second season, consisting of nine episodes, was released on October 27, 2017, in HDR. The third season once again consists of eight episodes, and was released on July 4, 2019. The fourth season, consisting of nine episodes, was released in two volumes on May 27 and July 1, 2022, respectively. The fifth and final season, consisting of eight episodes, premiered its first volume on November 26, 2025, the second on December 25, and the series finale on December 31.

Shortly after the fourth season's release, viewers reported that Will's friends did not acknowledge his birthday in an episode of the season that took place on that day. The Duffers said in an interview that they could rectify the matter by changing its month, which they called "George Lucas-ing the situation", in reference to the canon changes that George Lucas had made to the original Star Wars trilogy to match what the prequel trilogy had added. Some viewers took this to imply that scenes from earlier seasons were also being edited, including one from the first season where Jonathan takes discreet pictures of a pool party that Steve, Nancy, and Barbara are attending. The writers stated that "no scenes from previous seasons have ever been cut or re-edited", including this scene.

=== Home media ===
The first season was released on a Blu-ray/DVD combo pack exclusively to Target retailers on October 17, 2017, and the same for the 4K/Blu-ray combo pack on November 15, 2017, both of which includes vintage CBS-FOX VHS-inspired packaging. The second season received a similar release on November 6, 2018. A Blu-ray/4K box set of all five seasons was released by Arrow Films on July 27, 2026, in the United Kingdom, and on July 28, 2026, in the United States and Canada.

== Reception ==
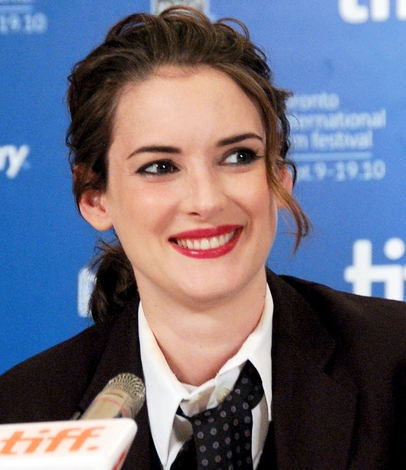
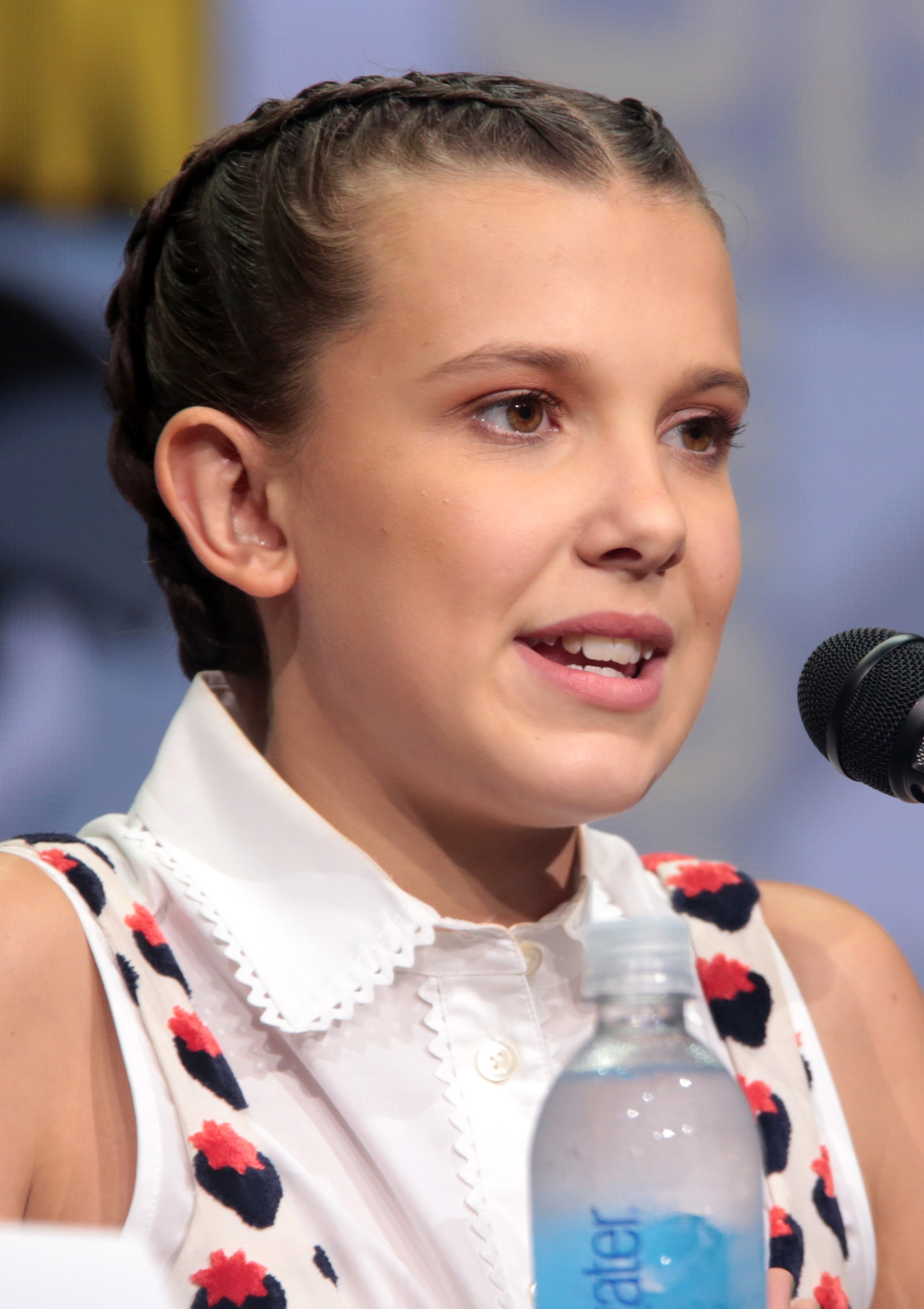
Winona Ryder (left) was nominated for a Golden Globe Award, a Satellite Award and a Screen Actors Guild Award, while Millie Bobby Brown (right) was nominated for two Screen Actors Guild Awards in the same category and two Primetime Emmy Awards.

=== Audience viewership ===
Netflix did not initially reveal subscriber viewership numbers for their original series, and Symphony Technology Group compiled data for the season based on people using software on their phones that measures television viewing by detecting a program's sound. According to Symphony, within the first 35 days of release, Stranger Things averaged ratings of around 14.07 million adults between the ages of 18 and 49 in the United States. This made it the third most-watched season of Netflix original content in the U.S. at the time behind the first season of Fuller House and fourth season of Orange Is the New Black. In a September 2016 analysis, Netflix found that Stranger Things "hooked" viewers by the second episode of the first season, indicating that the second episode was "the first installment that led at least 70 percent of viewers who watched that episode to complete the entire first season of the show".

For the third season, Netflix revealed that the show had broken viewing records for Netflix, with 40.7 million households having watched the show in its first four days, and 18.2 million already watched the entire series within that time frame. Within its first month, the third season was watched by 64 million households, setting a new record for the most-watched original Netflix series.

The series is the most followed TV show on social media app TV Time's history, with over 5 million followers.

=== Critical response ===
Critical response of Stranger Things
Season	Rotten Tomatoes	Metacritic
1	97% (92 reviews)	76 (34 reviews)
2	94% (150 reviews)	78 (33 reviews)
3	89% (141 reviews)	72 (28 reviews)
4	90% (200 reviews)	69 (29 reviews)
5	82% (161 reviews)	71 (32 reviews)

Review aggregator Rotten Tomatoes gave the series an overall score of 90% based on 658 critic reviews, while Metacritic, which uses a weighted average, gave an overall score of 74 based on 174 critic reviews.

For the first season, Rotten Tomatoes calculated an approval rating of 97% based on 92 reviews and an average rating of 8.2/10. The site's critical consensus states, "Exciting, heartbreaking, and sometimes scary, Stranger Things acts as an addictive homage to Spielberg films and vintage 1980s television." Metacritic gave the season a normalized score of 74 out of 100 based on 142 critics, indicating "generally favorable reviews". The New York Times has compared the show to Rob Reiner's Stand by Me, relating their nostalgic feel by "...finding that timeless moment where everything seemed tantalizingly, scarily new".

The second season has an approval rating on Rotten Tomatoes of 94% based on 150 reviews. The site's critical consensus states, "Stranger Things' slow-building sophomore season balances moments of humor and a nostalgic sweetness against a growing horror that's all the more effective thanks to the show's full-bodied characters and evocative tone." On Metacritic, the season has a normalized score of 78 out of 100, based on 33 critics, indicating "generally favorable reviews".

Rotten Tomatoes gave the third season an approval rating of 89% based on 141 reviews. The site's critical consensus states, "Vibrant and charming, Stranger Things transforms itself into a riveting—if familiar—summer ride that basks in its neon-laden nostalgia without losing sight of the rich relationships that make the series so endearing." On Metacritic, it has a normalized score of 72 out of 100, based on 28 critics, indicating "generally favorable reviews".

Rotten Tomatoes gave the fourth season an approval rating of 90% based on 200 reviews. The site's critical consensus reads, "Darker and denser than its predecessors, Stranger Things' fourth chapter sets the stage for the show's final season in typically binge-worthy fashion." Metacritic gave a score of 69 out of 100 based on 29 critics, indicating "generally favorable reviews".

Rotten Tomatoes gave the fifth and final season an approval rating of 82% based on 161 reviews. The site's critics consensus states, "Stranger Things plays its cards just right in Season 5, solidifying its pop culture classic status with genuinely captivating genre fare." Metacritic gave a score of 71 out of 100 based on 32 critics, indicating "generally favorable reviews".

Stranger Things was ranked the third-best television show of 2016 by The Guardian and Empire. It was also included on The Atlantic's list of best TV shows of 2017. In 2021, BBC Culture polled 206 "critics, journalists, academics and industry figures" from around the world to compile the 100 greatest television series of the 21st century; Stranger Things came in at number 68.

=== Commentary ===
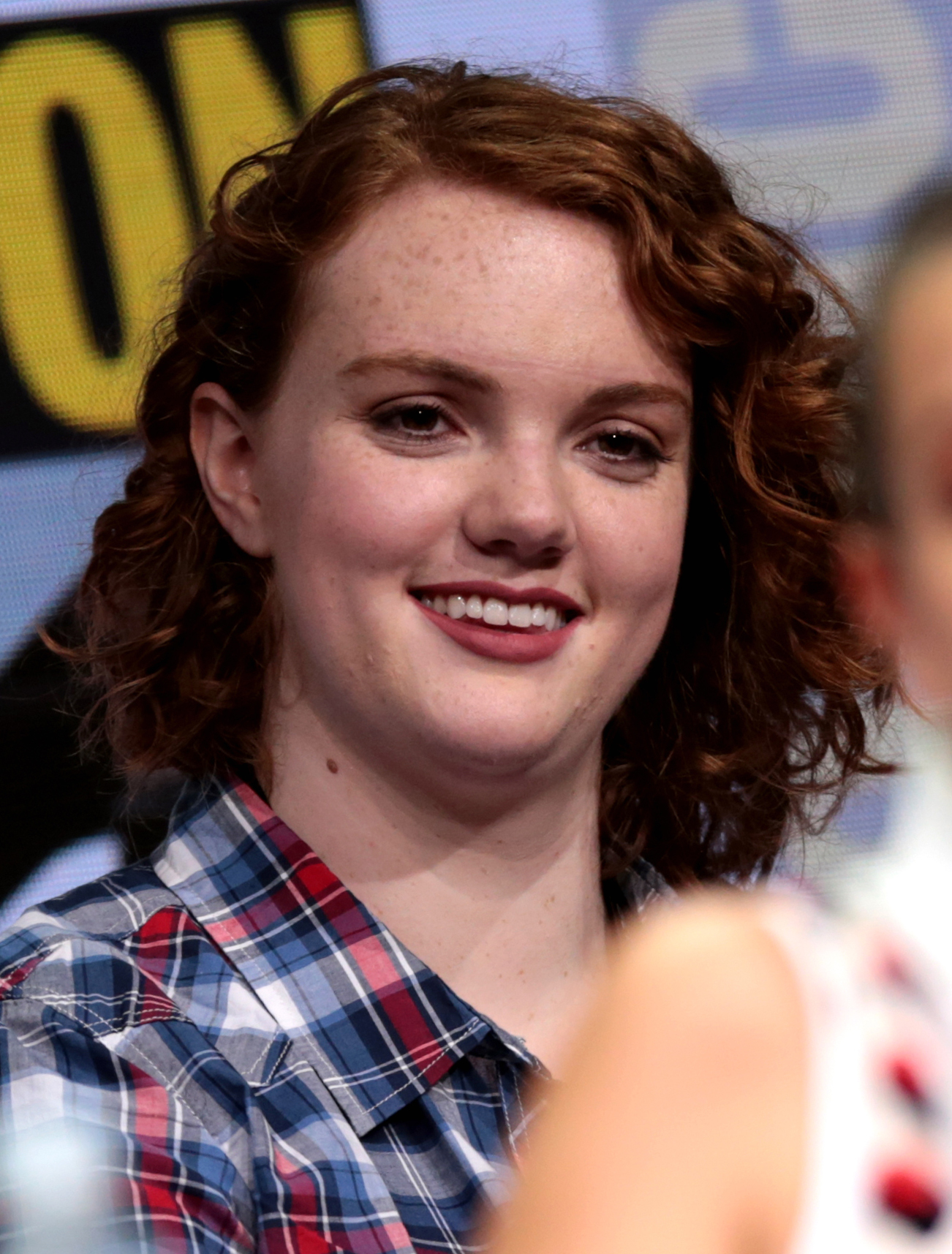
Shannon Purser's performance as Barb in the first season received widespread attention from fans and led to her being nominated for a Primetime Emmy Award for Outstanding Guest Actress in a Drama Series.

Stranger Things gained a dedicated fan base soon after its release. One area of focus was the character of Barb, Nancy's friend and classmate who is killed off early into the first season. According to actress Shannon Purser, Barb "wasn't supposed to be a big deal", and the Duffer Brothers had not gone into great detail about the character since the focus was on finding Will. However, many fans sympathized with the character; Laura Bradley of Vanity Fair suggested that Barb would be a similar misfit in society, and "looks more like someone you might actually meet in real life" compared to the other characters, particularly Nancy. Hashtags grew in popularity after the series' release, such as "#ImWithBarb" and "#JusticeforBarb", and several fan sites and forums were created to support her. Purser did not return for the second season, but the Duffers used the real-life "Justice for Barb" movement as inspiration for a storyline at the start of the season, in which Nancy addresses the fact "that no one ever cares about" Barb. Purser and several media outlets took her nomination for a Primetime Emmy Award for Outstanding Guest Actress in a Drama Series as achieving "Justice for Barb", highlighting how well her character was received.

Another impact of the series has been an increased demand for Eggo waffles, as they are shown to be Eleven's favorite food in several episodes and are seen as a representation of the series. The Kellogg Company manufactures Eggo and had not been part of the production prior to the first season's release, but they recognized the market impact of the series. They provided a vintage 1980s Eggo television advertisement for Netflix to use in its Super Bowl LI commercial, and they intend to become more involved with cross-promotion. Coca-Cola released a limited run of New Coke (introduced in 1985) to coincide with the third season, which takes place in 1985.

=== Controversies ===
In April 2018, filmmaker Charlie Kessler filed a lawsuit against the Duffer Brothers, claiming that they stole his idea behind his short film Montauk, which featured a similar premise of a missing boy, a nearby military base doing otherworldly experiments, and a monster from another dimension. Kessler directed the film and debuted it at the 2012 Hamptons International Film Festival. During the Tribeca Film Festival in April 2014, he pitched his film to the Duffer brothers and later gave them "the script, ideas, story and film" for a larger film idea which he called The Montauk Project. Kessler contended that the Duffer brothers used his ideas to devise the premise for Stranger Things and sought a third of the income that they had made from the series.

The Duffer brothers' lawyer stated that they never saw Kessler's film nor spoke to him regarding it, and that Kessler had no input into their concepts for Stranger Things. The judge denied summary judgment for the Duffer brothers in April 2019, allowing Kessler's suit to proceed to trial. Just before the trial was due to start in May 2019, Kessler withdrew his lawsuit after hearing the depositions and seeing documents from as early as 2010 which showed him that the Duffers had independently come up with the concept of Stranger Things.

Journalists have noted that the idea of supernatural events around Montauk had originated due to urban legend of the Montauk Project, which came to light from the 1992 book The Montauk Project: Experiments in Time.

In September 2017, multiple media outlets published articles about a cease-and-desist letter sent by a Netflix in-house attorney to the operator of a Stranger-Things-themed bar in Chicago. The letter included humorous references to the series: "unless I'm living in the Upside Down"; "we're not going to go full Dr. Brenner on you"; "the demogorgon is not always as forgiving". The letter also won praise from lawyers for its even-handedness in not demanding immediate closure of the bar, only demanding that the bar not remain open without Netflix's permission past its initial scheduled run.

In July 2022, six Jewish and Roma groups condemned the use of Lukiškės Prison as a filming location for the fourth season. Protesters pointed out the prison's involvement in the Holocaust and its role in the Ponary massacre; denounced Netflix's partnering with local tourism board Go Vilnius to rent out a refurbished Stranger Things-themed prison cell on Airbnb; and criticized Netflix's decision to repost images of fans' Eleven-inspired numerical tattoos on their Instagram, saying it "desecrates the living memories of Holocaust survivors". A petition calling on Netflix to close the rental and apologize garnered more than 60,000 signatures, leading Go Vilnius to shut down the Airbnb listing indefinitely. Multiple news outlets contacted Netflix for comment, but received no response.

=== Accolades ===
Stranger Things has received numerous awards and nominations across the entertainment industry, including ten Primetime Emmy Award nominations and four Golden Globe Award nominations through the second season. The series' cast has received several of these: the series' first-season cast won the Screen Actors Guild Award for Outstanding Performance by an Ensemble in a Drama Series, while series leads Ryder, Brown, and Harbour have earned individual awards and nominations.

== Franchise ==
The success of the series has led to a wider multimedia franchise, which includes various television spin-offs (Stranger Things: Tales from '85 and Other Worlds: A Stranger Things Adventure) and a stage play (Stranger Things: The First Shadow), as well a line of novels and comics, several video games, and extensive licensed merchandise.

== See also ==
- List of Primetime Emmy Awards received by Netflix
