= Upside Down (Stranger Things) =

Fictional wormhole

- Stranger Things location
- First appearance: "Chapter Three: Holly, Jolly" (2016)
- Last appearance: "Chapter Eight: The Rightside Up" (2025)
- Created by: The Duffer Brothers
- Genre: Science-fiction

In-universe information
- Other name: The Bridge
- Type: Wormhole

The Upside Down is a fictional interdimensional wormhole featured in the Netflix science fiction horror series Stranger Things, created by the Duffer Brothers. Introduced in the first season (2016), it serves as a central antagonistic force and setting throughout the series, acting as a bridge between Earth—specifically a frozen-in-time replica of the town of Hawkins, Indiana—and a chaotic alternate realm known as the Abyss.

Characterized by its toxic, spore-filled atmosphere, vine-overgrown landscapes, monstrous inhabitants, and psychic connections to the real world, the Upside Down originates from psychic experiments in 1983 and evolves from a perceived alternate dimension into its revealed nature as an unstable conduit, culminating in its collapse in the fifth and final season (2025). The entity draws inspiration from Dungeons & Dragons (D&D) lore, such as the Vale of Shadows, and has become a cultural symbol of interdimensional horror in popular media.

== In-universe description ==
=== Origins ===
The Upside Down's origins trace back to experiments at Hawkins National Laboratory in the 1970s and 1980s. In 1979, during a confrontation, test subject Eleven (Millie Bobby Brown) banished Henry Creel / One (Jamie Campbell Bower), later known as Vecna and Mr. Whatsit, to a barren, storm-ravaged dimension—the Abyss—where he encountered and shaped the Mind Flayer. The Upside Down proper formed in 1983 when Eleven, under Dr. Martin Brenner's (Matthew Modine) direction, psychically contacted Henry in the Abyss via a sensory deprivation tank, inadvertently creating a gateway that mirrored Hawkins and served as a conduit for invasion. This event allowed creatures from the Abyss to enter Earth, initiating the series' conflicts.

The dimension's name was coined by Eleven in the first season, as a game board analogy. Due to describe its shadowy, inverted nature. Scientific explanations in the series align with multiverse theories, with characters like Dustin Henderson (Gaten Matarazzo) referencing wormholes and chaotic realms. In the fifth season, Dr. Brenner's notes confirm its role as an interdimensional bridge between real world and the Abyss. It is a wormhole stabilized by a mass of exotic matter in the center, above Hawkins Lab.

=== Geography and atmosphere ===
The Upside Down is portrayed visually as Hawkins under siege by a bio-organic infestation. Its geography mirrors the normal town – the same houses, woods, and lab buildings appear – but every surface is covered in a web of blackish vines, membranes and spores. The air is cold and still, filled with drifting ash-like particles, and ambient lighting is dim and tinted (often red or blue) to reinforce an otherworldly feel. One designer noted that the Upside Down should look like "spreading disease" with "tentacles and spores" inspired by mold, mildew and microscopic patterns. Many sets were built twice: once for the real world and once for the Upside Down. For example, the Byers family house was filmed once in normal 1980s condition and again "completely covered in the membranous tentacles and slime of the Upside Down".

It was initially unknown how far the Upside Down extended, but in the fifth season it is revealed to only include the reflected Hawkins, surrounded by a circular flesh wall with its center at Hawkins Lab. Outside the wall is hyperspace containing nothing but floating debris that escaped the Upside Down through a hole in the barrier. The sky of the Upside Down includes giant floating boulders and eventually a "ceiling", which is the barrier between it and the Abyss.

=== Inhabitants ===
The Upside Down hosts dangerous creatures that did not originate in Hawkins. The first revealed monster is the Demogorgon, a humanoid predator with a flower-like head, which attacks in Season 1. In later seasons, additional inhabitants appear: Demodogs (juvenile Demogorgons), a giant hive-mind entity known as the Mind Flayer or "Shadow Monster" (capable of possessing and controlling animals and humans), and flayed humans turned into zombie-like thralls. Season 4 introduces Demobats (winged, bat-like creatures) and Henry Creel/Vecna (a human turned Upside-Down-dwelling villain). Collectively, these are described broadly as the "monstrous predators" unleashed by the lab's experiments.

=== Connection to Hawkins ===
The Upside Down is directly linked to Hawkins via special portals or "gates." The first gate opened under Hawkins Lab when Eleven contacted Demogorgon, creating the Upside Down. Nancy and others notice that objects in the Upside Down match Hawkins' 1983 state – for example, Nancy Wheeler's diary appears exactly as it was at that time – because the Upside Down remains "frozen in time" from its creation. Subsequent seasons show other breach points: the Hawkins tunnel system (Season 2) and a secret Soviet lab under Starcourt Mall (Season 3) both connect to the Upside Down. After the Starcourt gate is destroyed, Hawkins is briefly free of an open portal. In Season 4, the villain Vecna kills people to psychically open new gates from within the Upside Down back to Hawkins. In all cases, the dimension's layout corresponds to real-world Hawkins locations, emphasizing its role as a twisted mirror of the town.

== Production and design ==
=== Development and inspiration ===
The Upside Down was created by showrunners Matt and Ross Duffer as the focal supernatural element of Stranger Things. The Duffers conceived the series as an homage to 1980s genre fiction, drawing heavily on the works of Stephen King and Steven Spielberg. They have cited King's stories of psychic children (Carrie, Firestarter, The Shining) and Spielbergian 1980s adventure films (E.T., Goonies, Poltergeist) as major influences on Stranger Things. The show is also steeped in the era's pop culture: the protagonists' understanding of monsters comes from their role-playing games (Dungeons & Dragons), which directly inspired names like "Mind Flayer" (an existing D&D creature). Early on, the Duffers even planned to pitch a remake of King's It before ultimately inventing their own mythology. Viewers and critics also note parallels to H.P. Lovecraft's cosmic horror (ancient, otherworldly evil), reflecting the Upside Down's themes of an unknowable alternate dimension. In interviews, however, the creators emphasize the King/Spielberg influences above all.

=== Visual design ===
Production designer Chris Trujillo and his team built Hawkins sets and then created Upside-Down versions by extensive dressing and redressing. Rather than rely solely on CGI, much of the Upside Down's look was done practically: real sets were covered with synthetic "organic" materials. Trujillo explains that the Upside Down's growths were made from raw materials like foam, plastic sheeting, and even cotton "pussy willow" fluff to simulate fungal molds. The design ethos was to make it look like a spreading infection, with tendrils and membranes supplanting normal textures. For scenes showing the Upside Down, the same camera setups and set layouts were often reused – the crew would shoot a scene in the normal world and then reshoot in the Upside Down with the set overrun by vines. For example, the Hawkins Lab exterior and the Wheeler home were each built once and then darkened and covered in black tendrils for their Upside-Down counterparts.

Color grading and lighting also differentiate the dimension: scenes in the Upside Down use a muted palette with sickly green, blue or red hues, and heavy shadow. Electricity and electronic devices mostly fail there (phones and lights do not work), enhancing the eerie silence. The production book and Tudum featurette note that the Upside Down sets preserve accurate 1980s detail (furniture, posters, etc.) but appear decayed – as one designer put it, it "mind-bendingly mirrors the characters' reality" while remaining "impossibly evil".

=== Sound design ===
Sound design is a key aspect of depicting the Upside Down's menace. Sound supervisor Craig Henighan and team layered organic and metallic noises to create its signature soundscape. They often combined dozens of individual elements (hundreds of recordings) for each creature or effect. For instance, the squelching tendrils of the Upside Down in Season 4 were created by mixing sounds of plants or vines with explosive percussion; Henighan notes that the audio team put "explosion-y gunshots underneath those vine sounds" to make them feel "larger than life". The high-pitched shrieks of the flying demobats in Season 4 were inspired by everyday noises – a squeaky closet door hinge provided the chittering sound at their core. In general, scenes in the Upside Down use minimal musical score and rely on ambient textures and sudden auditory jabs to maintain tension. Silence and echo (especially when communicating between dimensions) are used to reinforce the otherworldliness.

=== Special effects ===
The Upside Down's phenomena and monsters are realized through a combination of practical effects, makeup, and CGI. The Demogorgon creature, for example, was brought to life using creature suits and animatronics for on-set shooting, supplemented by digital cleanup. Larger or more complex entities (the gigantic Mind Flayer) are mostly CGI. Particle effects (floating dust, ash, and spores) are digitally composited over live-action footage to convey the dimension's toxic atmosphere. Notably, in Season 4's key scene when Eleven seals the "Mother Gate", elaborate visual effects show raw energy and dimensional distortion, although full production details have not been released.

== Reception ==
The Upside Down, as a central element in the Netflix series Stranger Things, has been the subject of extensive critical analysis, academic discussion, and cultural commentary. Critics and scholars have praised its design and narrative function while interpreting it through various lenses, including psychological, social, and mythological frameworks. The dimension's portrayal has also contributed significantly to the show's broader cultural impact, influencing media, branding, and popular discourse.

=== Critical reception ===
Reviewers have generally acclaimed the Upside Down for its atmospheric design and integration into the series' horror elements. In a 2018 review for the Los Angeles Review of Books, critic Josh Bell described the Upside Down in the second season as evolving beyond mere nostalgia, functioning as a "cautionary historical fiction" that sharpens focus on contemporary issues through its eerie, decaying landscape. Similarly, a 2019 academic article in Post45 by Elizabeth Reich analyzed the Upside Down as a biopolitical metaphor, arguing that its underground tunnels of contamination represent the "extra-temporal, perpetually endangered, and suffocating existence of black life in the US" during the Reagan era, subverting the show's surface-level optimism. The dimension's visual and thematic depth has been credited with elevating the series' horror, with Deadline noting in 2025 that the Duffers' revelations about its wormhole nature in the final season provided long-awaited clarity while maintaining its abstract terror.

A 2026 Forbes article echoed fan criticisms of the finale, describing the Abyss as a "barren, VFX-heavy wasteland" that lacked the Upside Down's creepy, organic atmosphere, leading to online mockery and comparisons to unrelated media. Academic analysis in a 2018 paper from the University of Leeds' White Rose Research Online repository praised the Upside Down's role in hyper-postmodernism, noting how it breaks down boundaries between film, television, and "geek" culture through intertextual references that emerge "as text."

=== Cultural impact ===
The Upside Down has become an iconic symbol in popular culture, contributing to Stranger Things role in reviving 1980s nostalgia and reshaping media consumption. A 2025 Northeastern Global News article highlighted how the dimension's introduction helped Netflix disrupt Hollywood, turning the platform from an upstart to an industry leader, though noting the show's later seasons adopted more traditional structures. Netflix's own 2025 report detailed the Upside Down's influence on global trends, including a 1,250% increase in Gen Z streams of Diana Ross's "Upside Down" on Spotify and over 300,000 fans attending related events across 23 countries. The dimension inspired widespread branding tie-ins, such as Burger King's Upside Down Whopper and Nike's Hawkins High sneakers, generating an estimated $1.4 billion in economic impact through tourism, royalties, and merchandise, as reported in a 2025 Open The Magazine feature.

In a 2025 California Aggie essay, the Upside Down was cited as exemplifying streaming television's repurposing of 1980s pop culture for Gen Z audiences, fostering nostalgia through references to films like The Goonies and The Terminator. A 2025 Digital Marketing Institute analysis described how the dimension "turned branding upside down", with campaigns like H&M's retro clothing lines leveraging its imagery for viral success without disrupting the narrative. Educator Anthony Perrotta, in a 2017 blog post, argued that the Upside Down's cultural resonance stems from its political undertones, mirroring post-Edward Snowden distrust of government and echoing 1980s films' critiques of secrecy and greed.
