= Chapter One: The Hellfire Club =

- Stranger Things episode
- Promotional poster by Butcher Billy
- Episode no.: Season 4 Episode 1
- Directed by: The Duffer Brothers
- Written by: The Duffer Brothers
- Original release date: May 27, 2022
- Running time: 77 minutes

Guest appearances
- Logan Riley Bruner as Fred Benson; Joe Chrest as Ted Wheeler; Catherine Curtin as Claudia Henderson; Mason Dye as Jason Carver; Amybeth McNulty as Vickie; Elodie Grace Orkin as Angela; Gabriella Pizzolo as Suzie; Grace Van Dien as Chrissy Cunningham; Martie Blair as young Eleven; Christian Ganiere as Ten; Tristan Spohn as Two; Hendrix Yancey as Thirteen; Myles Truitt as Patrick McKinney; Elizabeth Becka as Dr. Ellis; Regina Ting Chen as Ms. Kelly; Julia Reilly as Tammy Thompson

Episode chronology
← Previous "Chapter Eight: The Battle of Starcourt"	Next → "Chapter Two: Vecna's Curse"
- Stranger Things season 4

"Chapter One: The Hellfire Club" is the fourth season premiere of the American science fiction horror drama television series Stranger Things, and its 26th episode overall. Set in 1986, eight months after the events of the previous season, it shows the changes and challenges of Eleven, Mike Wheeler, and their friends in their freshman year of high school, while a new supernatural monster begins attacking the inhabitants of Hawkins. The episode was written and directed by the series' creators, the Duffer Brothers.

The episode stars Winona Ryder, Millie Bobby Brown, Finn Wolfhard, Gaten Matarazzo, Caleb McLaughlin, Noah Schnapp, Sadie Sink, Natalia Dyer, Charlie Heaton, Joe Keery, Maya Hawke, Brett Gelman, Priah Ferguson, Matthew Modine, and Cara Buono, all returning from previous seasons, alongside new cast members Jamie Campbell Bower, Eduardo Franco, and Joseph Quinn.

"The Hellfire Club" was released on May 27, 2022, on Netflix. The episode received positive reviews from critics, who praised Quinn's performance and the horror elements.

== Plot ==
On September 8, 1979 at Hawkins National Laboratory, Dr. Martin Brenner experiments on several children possessing supernatural abilities. While performing extrasensory perception (ESP) tests with subject Ten, Ten senses a violent attack nearby, before a mysterious explosion knocks out Brenner and kills Ten. Brenner later awakens and makes his way to a playroom, where he finds an angered and bloodied Eleven standing amid the corpses of the other children and staff.

In March 1986, eight months after the events at Starcourt Mall, (Note: As depicted in the third season finale "Chapter Eight: The Battle of Starcourt".) Eleven has moved to Lenora Hills, California with Joyce Byers and her sons Will and Jonathan. Now attending Lenora Hills High School alongside Will, Jonathan, and Jonathan's friend Argyle, she struggles with the loss of her powers while being routinely bullied by a girl named Angela. One day, Joyce receives a porcelain doll in the mail, seemingly from Russia. She contacts Murray Bauman, who warns the doll could be impregnated with an explosive device. Joyce breaks the doll open and discovers a hidden note inside, revealing that Jim Hopper is alive.

In Hawkins, Mike Wheeler, Max Mayfield, Lucas Sinclair, and Dustin Henderson now attend Hawkins High School. Mike, Lucas, and Dustin have joined their school's "Hellfire Club", a Dungeons & Dragons-themed society led by the eccentric Eddie Munson. Lucas has also joined the basketball team and struggles to make time between the two clubs when he reveals their championship game is the same night as the end of Eddie's campaign. As a result, Mike and Dustin seek the help of Lucas' sister, Erica, who agrees to fill in Lucas' place. As the campaign and the game occur concurrently, both Lucas and Erica score the winning shot for their respective teams.

Meanwhile, Max struggles with the loss of her step-brother Billy and has ended her relationship with Lucas. She frequently visits the office of the school counselor, Ms. Kelly. Chrissy Cunningham, a student on the cheerleading team, is haunted by visions of her family and a ticking grandfather clock. That night, while buying drugs from Eddie, Chrissy is possessed and killed by a sentient, humanoid creature from her visions.

== Production ==
=== Development ===
The fourth season was announced on September 30, 2019. The series' creators the Duffer Brothers executive produce, along with Shawn Levy, Dan Cohen, Iain Paterson, and Curtis Gwinn. The first episode of the season, "The Hellfire Club", written and directed by the Duffer Brothers, was released on May 27, 2022, on Netflix.

=== Writing ===
"The Hellfire Club" is set in March 1986, over eight months after the events of the third season, while also featuring a flashback taking place in 1979, four years before the beginning of the series.

Matt Duffer indicated one of the plot's "broad strokes" is the main center of action being moved out of Hawkins, Indiana, for the majority of the season, a series first. He also indicated the several loose ends left by the ending of third season finale, such as Jim Hopper's perceived death and Eleven being adopted by Joyce Byers and relocating with her new family out of state, would be explored sometime during the fourth season.

The character of Eddie Munson is based on Damien Echols, one of the West Memphis Three that was wrongly convicted in 1994 of the deaths of three boys due to his appearance which residents tied to being part of a satanic cult. The writers drew from Paradise Lost: The Child Murders at Robin Hood Hills, a documentary covering Echols, for Eddie's story.

As they had done with the Demogorgon from the first season, the Duffers opted to use the Dungeons & Dragons character of Vecna as the basis of this season's antagonist, something that the child characters would recognize and understand the dangers due to their familiarity through the role-playing game. While Vecna was not fully introduced in Dungeons & Dragons materials until 1990 through the module Vecna Lives! and only had been alluded to in the lore prior to that, the Duffers believed that Eddie was an advanced gamemaster that was able to extrapolate how Vecna would behave for purposes of the show.

=== Casting ===
Sullivan. C is in the hellfire club Winona Ryder as Joyce Byers, Millie Bobby Brown as Eleven / Jane Hopper, Finn Wolfhard as Mike Wheeler, Gaten Matarazzo as Dustin Henderson, Caleb McLaughlin as Lucas Sinclair, Noah Schnapp as Will Byers, Sadie Sink as Max Mayfield, Natalia Dyer as Nancy Wheeler, Charlie Heaton as Jonathan Byers, Joe Keery as Steve Harrington, Maya Hawke as Robin Buckley, Brett Gelman as Murray Bauman, Priah Ferguson as Erica Sinclair, Matthew Modine as Martin Brenner, and Cara Buono as Karen Wheeler, alongside new cast members Jamie Campbell Bower as Vecna, Eduardo Franco as Argyle, and Joseph Quinn as Eddie Munson.

Guest starring in the episode are Logan Riley Bruner as Fred Benson, Joe Chrest as Ted Wheeler, Catherine Curtin as Claudia Henderson, Mason Dye as Jason Carver, Amybeth McNulty as Vickie, Elodie Grace Orkin as Angela, Gabriella Pizzolo as Suzie, Grace Van Dien as Chrissy Cunningham, Martie Blair as the young Eleven, Christian Ganiere as Ten, Tristan Spohn as Two, Myles Truitt as Patrick McKinney, Elizabeth Becka as Dr. Ellis, Regina Ting Chen as Ms. Kelly, and Julia Reilly as Tammy Thompson.

=== Filming ===
To visually distinguish between the season's three storylines, costume designer Amy Parris revealed that each of the plot's locations would have their own distinct color palette: "It's so fun because [the production team gets] to kind of capture California versus Hawkins through color. So, Hawkins still looks very saturated. We don't have as much as the dusty, rusty brown of seasons 1 or 2 ... And in California, we get to incorporate baby pinks, and fun teals and purples. It's way more sun-soaked and saturated as opposed to the richer colors of Hawkins." American shoe company Converse designed three different styles of shoes using the Hawkins High School colors to be worn onscreen during a scene depicting a pep rally.

According to Bower, for the key scenes of the massacre at the Hawkins lab, Brown herself helped to direct Blair, who played the younger version of Eleven.

=== Post-production ===
In April 2022, The Wall Street Journal reported in an article scrutinizing Netflix's recent production expenditures that the total cost to produce season four of Stranger Things was around $270 million, which amounts to roughly $30 million per episode.

==== Warning card ====
The season's release on May 27, 2022, occurred three days after a mass school shooting in Uvalde, Texas, where a gunman fatally shot 21 people, 19 of them children. In the aftermath of the tragedy, and considering that episode 1's cold open — a scene that had been released as an online tease one week before the premiere — features graphic images of dead bodies (including those of children), Netflix added a warning card before the prior season recap that automatically plays before the episode. The card, which is shown only to viewers in the United States, reads thusly:

We filmed this season of Stranger Things a year ago. But given the recent tragic shooting at a school in Texas, viewers may find the opening scene of episode 1 distressing. We are deeply saddened by this unspeakable violence, and our hearts go out to every family mourning a loved one.

=== Visual effects ===
Due to the season's considerable length, thousands of visual effect shots were commissioned and rendered during the two-year production and post-production processes. However, the Duffers wanted to rely more on practical effects than computer-generated ones, similar to how the first season was produced. For example, Vecna, the humanoid creature from the Upside Down, was "90% practical", which the Duffers found created a better presence on the set for the actors to respond to rather than a prop for later computer-generated effects. Barrie Gower, a make-up artist that had worked previously on Game of Thrones and Chernobyl, provided the look for Vecna and other creatures. Bower played the role of Vecna with the use of planned prosthetics. Gower designed Bower's Vecna costume with "anemic" skin whose integration with the toxic environment of the Upside Down was apparent through the inclusion of "lot of roots and vines and very organic shapes and fibrous muscle tissue." To achieve this look using mostly practical effects, Gower disclosed that he and his team took a full body cast of Bower, to later sculpt to meet their design needs:

We started off with his life cast, and to make sure everything was going to be super skin-tight, we reduced the life cast by a certain percentage all over, so once we had a plaster form of his entire body, our guys here started modeling the body in all shapes and forms in the Plasticine, which took several weeks to do that. From that, we split the body up into various sections... I think it was about 18 pieces in total, and they all went on to their own respective formers made out of either fiberglass or epoxy resin. And then we made molds of all the separate Plasticine pieces and then once we had these molds, we were able to create prosthetic appliances, and we've done them in a mixture of materials.

Once the outfit was prepared, it took about seven hours of work to fit Bower into it.

=== Music ===
The episode features the songs "California Dreamin'" by The Beach Boys, "Object of My Desire" by Starpoint, "Running Up That Hill" by Kate Bush, "I Was A Teenage Werewolf" and "Fever" by The Cramps, "Play with Me" by Extreme, "Detroit Rock City" by Kiss, and "Got Your Number" by The Lloyd Langton Group. It also features “The Red Army Is Strongest” as performed by the Red Army Choir.

== Marketing ==
On October 2, 2020, the show's various social media accounts posted two photographs from different sets: a poster for a pep rally hanging in a hallway at Hawkins High, and a clapperboard in front of a grandfather clock in the Upside Down, a scene that was first depicted in the season's initial teaser trailer. A teaser released on November 6, 2021, showed Will and Eleven's lives in California. On May 20, 2022, the first eight minutes of the first episode were released online.

== Reception ==
=== Critical response ===
On Rotten Tomatoes, the episode holds an approval rating of 100% based on 8 reviews, with an average rating of 7.6/10.

Paul Dailly of TV Fantastic gave the episode a 4.5 out of 5 stars stating, "I wasn't sold initially on the characters being pulled apart because it felt like a forced development to tell different stories. After watching 'Chapter One: The Hellfire Club,' the writing is as strong as ever, and the characters are evolving in ways I didn't think possible before."

Members of the press who had seen the first episode in advance wrote that it had a "darker, more mature, and scare-heavy vibe". They also praised the episode for giving more space for the characters.

=== Accolades ===
TVLine named Joseph Quinn the "Performer of the Week" for the week of May 28, 2022, for his performance in the episode. The site wrote: "Quinn took the teenager in short order from curious to concerned, then from panicked to so utterly horrified that he let out the kind of shriek that other shrieks hear and go, 'Whoa.' All in all, Quinn's debut was as auspicious as they come."

Decider included the episode in its list of "The Best TV Episodes of 2022."
