= Chapter Three: The Case of the Missing Lifeguard =

- Stranger Things episode
- Official poster for the episode by Butcher Billy, featured Eleven (left) and Max (right) as they arrive at Heather's house.
- Episode no.: Season 3 Episode 3
- Directed by: Shawn Levy
- Written by: William Bridges
- Original air date: July 4, 2019
- Running time: 50 minutes

Guest appearances
- Francesca Reale as Heather; Peggy Miley as Doris Driscoll.

Episode chronology
← Previous "Chapter Two: The Mall Rats"	Next → "Chapter Four: The Sauna Test"
- Stranger Things season 3

"Chapter Three: The Case of the Missing Lifeguard" is the third episode of the third season of the American science fiction horror drama television series Stranger Things. Written by William Bridges and directed by Shawn Levy, it was originally released on Netflix in the United States on July 4, 2019, along with the rest of the third season.

Created by the Duffer Brothers, the series, set in the 1980s, follows the fictional town of Hawkins, Indiana, and the supernatural happenings that occur within it. In "The Case of the Missing Lifeguard", Eleven and Max find out that Billy is involved in Heather's disappearance, and go looking for her. Meanwhile, Joyce and Hopper investigate in Hawkins Lab, Nancy and Jonathan continue their pursuit of a story about the mysterious rats circulating Hawkins, and Steve, Robin, and Dustin crack the Russian code.

Filming of the episode was unique, both for the scene where Will destroys Castle Byers and when Heather is submerged in a bathtub; both Noah Schnapp and Francesca Reale enjoyed filming their respective scenes, with Millie Bobby Brown insisting on not using a body double for the latter's scene in order to help Reale through filming. Finn Wolfhard and Schnapp both agreed that the scene of Mike saying, "It's not my fault you don't like girls" was not a hint at Will possibly being queer, but instead an indicator of how different he was from his friends in terms of maturity. Despite this, the scene—and Will's general presence in the episode—have been analyzed for how it defines and changes his characterization from this point on. Upon release, the episode received generally positive reviews from critics, and was considered by some to be a step-up in quality for the season.

== Background ==
Stranger Things is set in the 1980s, and follows the supernatural happenings occurring in the fictional town of Hawkins, Indiana. It houses an ensemble cast, focusing on three different groups: the children, Dustin (Gaten Matarazzo), Lucas (Caleb McLaughlin), Mike (Finn Wolfhard), Will (Noah Schnapp), Max (Sadie Sink), and Eleven (Millie Bobby Brown), who has telekinetic powers; the teenagers, Steve (Joe Keery), Robin (Maya Hawke), Mike's older sister Nancy (Natalia Dyer), Max's step-brother Billy (Dacre Montgomery), and Will's older brother Jonathan (Charlie Heaton); and the adults, Will's mother Joyce (Winona Ryder), and Hawkins Police of Chief and Eleven's caretaker Hopper (David Harbour).

Throughout the first two seasons, Will experiences much of Hawkins' supernatural happenings, including being taken by a Demogorgon, a race of monsters. He is then controlled subconsciously by the Mind Flayer, an entity that controls the Demogorgons, who is also the main villain at this point. In season three, several plots have been set up in the prior two episodes, including a friendship forming between Max and Eleven—leading to the latter breaking up with Mike—and Joyce noticing odd occurrences, like magnets losing their magnetism. Other plots include Nancy and Jonathan, now working at a newspaper, stumbling upon a mystery involving strange rats that torment the town and an elderly woman named Mrs. Driscoll (Peggy Miley) who has information, and Steve and Dustin finding a secret Russian code while the former works at an ice cream shop with Robin in Starcourt Mall. Concurrently, Billy has been taken over by the Mind Flayer, and is giving people to it as a sacrifice, starting with his co-worker Heather (Francesca Reale).

== Plot ==
At her house, Eleven uses her powers with Max to spy on people, and, after seeing Mike talk badly about them, they spy on Billy. Eleven finds him in the middle of sacrificing Heather to the Mind Flayer—although she only sees Billy holding Heather. Joyce comes to speak about the magnets with Hopper, who is upset that she ditched their date to go talk to schoolteacher Scott about the magnets, and, after Joyce pushes him to, they go to Hawkins Laboratory to see if they have any involvement. Eleven and Max go through Billy's room, and find Heather's belongings in his bathroom, prompting them to go look for her at her job to no avail, but they find a picture of Heather that they take. Nancy and Jonathan tell their employers about Mrs. Driscoll, but they mock her, and she walks off angry.

At a sleepover, Will eagerly plays Dungeons & Dragons with Mike and Lucas, who mock him while playing, so Will storms off. They apologize, but Will says that Mike and Lucas care more about their girlfriends than him and Dustin, riding off on his bike in the rain. Eleven finds Heather with her powers, seeing Heather submerged in a bathtub filled with ice, asking for help, terrifying Eleven. After a false lead regarding the Russian code, Dustin and Steve get help from Robin, who instantly understands it as the Russians discussing a meeting point at the mall for something unknown. Mike and Lucas go looking for Will, and find him in the woods destroying his fort, Castle Byers, and Will reveals that he feels the Mind Flayer's presence again.

Nancy and Jonathan break into Mrs. Driscoll's house, and see her eating the same fertilizer that the rats have been consuming. Dustin, Steve, and Robin spy on the Russians making a delivery at the mall, and flee before they are caught. At Hawkins Lab, Joyce and Hopper don't find anything, but Hopper is beaten by a man in the dark, who runs off before they can identify him. Eleven and Max go to Heather's house, finding Heather's parents with Billy and Heather, confusing them, and they leave without telling the truth about why they came over. Billy sees them off, and Heather's parents both collapse, having been poisoned by Billy and a Mind Flayer-controlled Heather, and given as sacrifices to it.

== Production ==
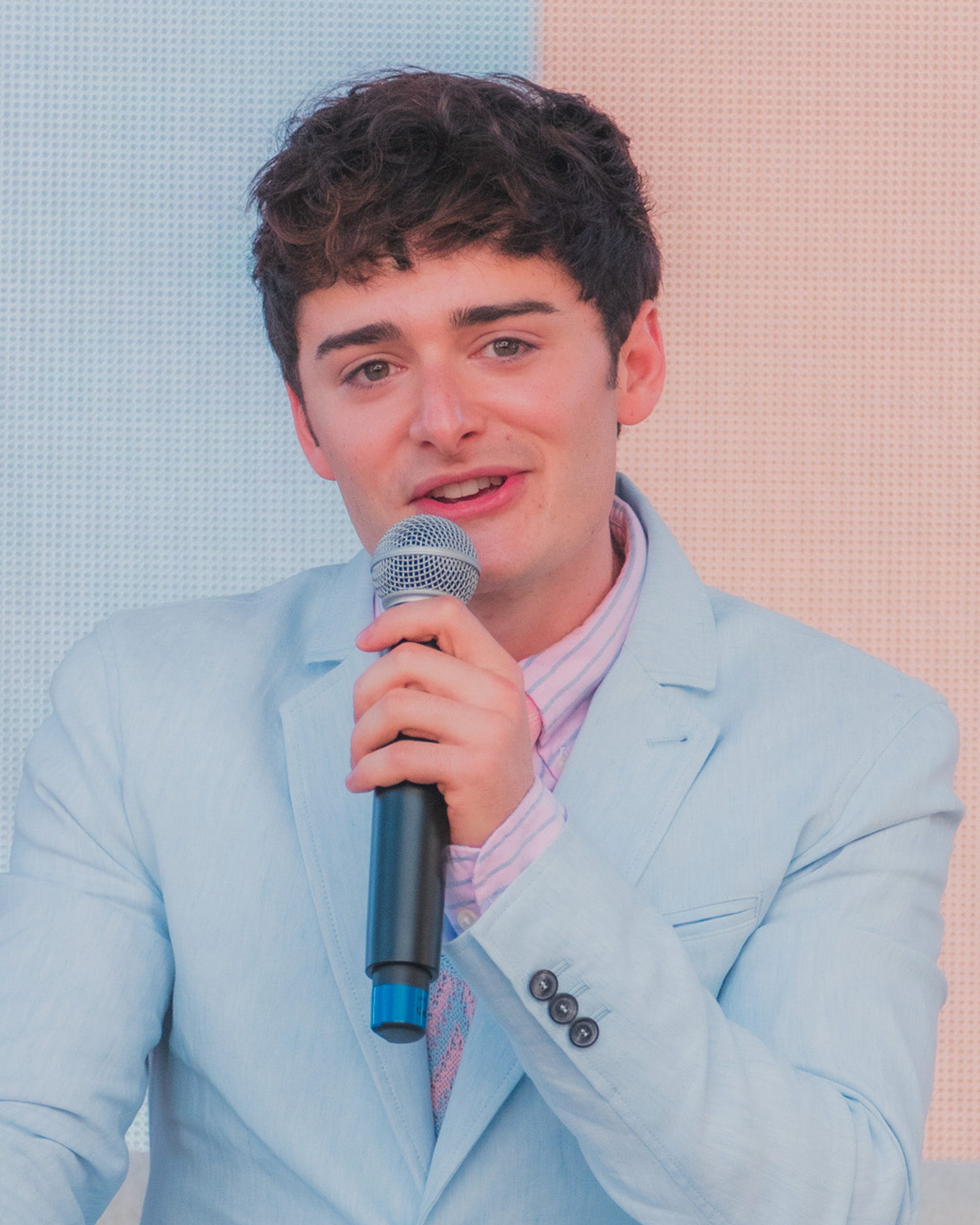
Noah Schnapp (pictured) agreed with co-star Finn Wolfhard that Will's sexuality was not teased in the episode.

"The Case of the Missing Lifeguard" was directed by Shawn Levy and written by William Bridges. The episode featured some guest stars, including Francesca Reale as Heather and Peggy Miley as Doris Driscoll.

When Will Byers and Mike Wheeler are arguing before the former storms off, Mike shouts "It's not my fault you don't like girls". This line went through several revisions before the final version, according to Finn Wolfhard, including one where Mike says "It's not my fault you don't like girls yet". These revisions were because of the Duffer Brothers, the Stranger Things creators, who wanted to "[do] a bunch of different things to it". Wolfhard felt that the line wasn't necessarily touching on Will's sexuality, and was instead Mike stating that Will just wasn't friends with girls in the same way that he was friends with boys. Noah Schnapp shared a similar sentiment, stating that it was up to audience interpretation and that he saw it as Will just wanting to play with his friends, especially since he is the only one of the boys to not have a girlfriend, causing him to possibly feel alienated.

Will's destruction of Castle Byers was emotional for Schnapp, despite how much he enjoyed filming it. The rain seen during it was all fake and it was done in the middle of the night. Schnapp stated that he had always wanted to do a scene like this, and was excited to be given the opportunity to do so. He highlighted getting to hit the tower with a bat as much as he wanted to, wanting to "go all out", but the impact of the scene still affected Schnapp, who claimed that he "cried all night" after filming wrapped. The scene of Heather in the bathtub was also intense to film, according to Reale, who shared that it was still one of her favorite scenes to do. Filming was spread across two different days and one filming day consisted entirely of Reale just sitting in the tub, "drowning myself basically". Instead of real ice, silicon cubes were used, which created a sand-like substance that attached itself to Reale's body, and was hard to get off. Reale commended Millie Bobby Brown for her acting in the scene—which included mostly yelling—as she filmed it after getting a knee injury. Brown opted not to use a double, choosing instead to perform the scene herself to help Reale through filming.

== Themes and analysis ==
The episode somewhat adheres to philosophical concepts associated with René Descartes, with the episode, and the series as a whole, using maps and navigational language to get points across. With this, the episode "enables characters to understand the world from a distance without recognizing one's [subjective] attachments to [the world]", as seen when the gang says that, to stop the Mind Flayer from continuing its turning of people into goo, they must remove "the brain from the body", similar to Cartesian "binaries of mind/brain". "The Case of the Missing Lifeguard" reiterates the season's core theme of Eleven becoming the "Final Girl" (Note: The "Final Girl" is the concept of a female character who survives for the sole purpose of defeating a villain that kills or takes the other characters, sometimes alternatively being the only one to notice something unusual that others ignore.) of the series, being the first to notice that something is wrong with Billy, and, after seeing Heather alive at the end of the episode, Eleven finds this odd, asserting that something must be wrong, while Max takes this "at face value", assuring her that everything is fine. Author Rashna Wadia Richards contrasted the episode, along with the entirety of Stranger Things, to the film Stand by Me in her book Cinematic TV: Serial Drama Goes to the Movies. In the film, Gordie LaChance looks back on his childhood, "wistful about boyhood friendships" and reminiscing about his time spent with the other main characters; oppositely, Will looks back on his childhood more negatively after he is rejected by his friends during the game of Dungeons & Dragons, destroying his childhood fort while repeating, "This is so stupid". Moments like these note how different the world of Stranger Things is to other media, where childhood is a "romanticized tribute" that forwards the narrative, while the series has Will look back in "anger and pain".

=== Will's characterization ===
Mike (left) and Will (right) as they argue in the rain; a remark made by Mike in this scene sparked rumors that Will might be gay, and has been heavily analyzed.

Mike's line, "It's not my fault you don't like girls", sparked rumors among viewers as to whether or not Will is gay. The line is the first time in the series that Will's possible struggle with his sexuality is directly addressed, as previous episodes only alluded to it, like Joyce calling him a "sensitive kid". Writing about the scene and its impact on the series' fandom, author Mike Stack compared it to the Doctor Who franchise and fandom through the episode's theme of "the connection between queerness and the refusal to decathect". With fans often forming bonds with characters, a queer character will be likeable to a queer viewer, something the Doctor Who and Stranger Things fandoms have in common, with this episode being a possible catalyst for queer people who identify with Will. Decider writer Brett White viewed the scene as confirmation of his sexuality, naturally continuing a plot point that has been built up since the first episode and "indirectly fuel[ing]" Will's role in season three, slowly laying the groundwork for him to come out. White also saw it as a reverse of how the bullies in season one tormented Will for being possibly gay, as Mike, Will's friend, is the one saying it, and he is addressing it in a way that isn't hateful, or even addressing his sexuality, adhering to the trope of "saying the quiet part loud".

The episode as a whole also explores Will's character alongside his sexuality, with Will wishing to return to times where he and his friends would play Dungeons & Dragons and not be focused on relationships, declaring their sleepover to be a day "free of girls". Author Tracey Mollet felt this was the series' way of addressing his struggles with sexual maturity being intertwined with growing up, something Will wishes not to do, comparing Will's connection to the group to Mike's relationship with Eleven, writing that "[the third season] does not insist upon a relational stagnancy between the boys or indeed, the exclusion of its implied queer male". It sets up that Will is different from his peers, not just in sexual orientation, but through his character. While the other boys have already moved onto getting girlfriends or making out, Will is not interested in any of this, wanting to stay an adolescent and play with his friends. Will is "defined by his difference" to these things, despite how much the series hints that he is confused sexually, with Mike pointing this out. This can also be a metaphor for his sexual assault allegory, according to author Emily Katseanes, who likens Will's kidnapping and the monster's way of getting into his subconscious to possible allusions to sexual assault and its consequences on one's mental state, wanting to return to simpler times.

== Release ==
Along with the rest of the third season, the episode was first released on Netflix on July 4, 2019. Regarding viewers who watched the season on a television set, "The Case of the Missing Lifeguard" was watched by 5.3 million people during its first day on the service, and received a share of 1.6%, meaning 1.6% of its target audience across all television mediums watched the episode that day. By the third day that the episode was out, it had received 15.92 million total viewers and a 5.2% share. Along with the entire series, "The Case of the Missing Lifeguard" is set to be released on home media in the United States on July 28, 2026, in the Stranger Things: The Complete Series box-set, on Blu-ray and 4K UHD formats.

== Reception ==
NME writer Dan Stubbs gave the episode a positive review, calling it "the one where the plot strands really start coming together", highlighting its "dark" and "sensitive" storyline about Will, his maturity, and the conflict within the boys' friend group. Miles Surrey of The Ringer praised "The Case of the Missing Lifeguard", calling the episode "gleefully riffing" for its parodies of '80s media like Red Dawn, which he considered one of its highlights. Surrey also felt the episode helped the third season get bigger in scale and scope, particularly by building up the Russians as the season's villains. Similarly, IGN's David Griffin listed it as the season's best up to that point, for introducing darker themes similar to the previous two seasons, as well as "impactful character moments". Ultimately giving it an 8.9/10, Griffin highlighted plots like Dustin and Steve's and Hopper's and Joyce's as some of its best, although he criticized what the episode did with Jonathan and Nancy, calling it the "least interesting plot to follow" for not creating as much captivating story potential as the others did.

Emily L. Stephens of The A.V. Club commended the episode for giving some characters unique characterization and for forwarding the plot compared to the previous two episodes, along with the flashback to the first episode as Will destroys Castle Byers, a moment she described as "bittersweet". Stephens also praised its use of slapstick and unique humor, grading the episode a B+. Retrospectively, ComicBook.com's Tyler Geis listed it as the seventh best episode of the series, calling it an underrated installment that is often overlooked, and noting that the concluding scene with "American Pie" playing over it was the main factor for its inclusion. He also praised the scene of Will destroying Castle Byers, an example of the episode's "theme of innocence [and how it is] lost in the characters and the show as a whole now", creating what Geis felt was Will's most important scene in the series at this point.

For the music of "The Case of the Missing Lifeguard", Nora Felder received a Primetime Creative Arts Emmy Awards nomination for Outstanding Music Supervision in 2020, but it ultimately lost to The Marvelous Mrs. Maisel's "It's Comedy or Cabbage".
