= Stranger Things season 3 =

Stranger Things
- Season 3
- Promotional poster
- Showrunner: Matt Duffer Ross Duffer
- Starring: Winona Ryder; David Harbour; Finn Wolfhard; Millie Bobby Brown; Gaten Matarazzo; Caleb McLaughlin; Noah Schnapp; Sadie Sink; Natalia Dyer; Charlie Heaton; Joe Keery; Dacre Montgomery; Maya Hawke; Priah Ferguson; Cara Buono
- No. of episodes: 8

Release
- Original network: Netflix
- Original release: July 4, 2019

Season chronology
- ← Previous; Season 2 Next → Season 4

The third season of the American science fiction horror drama television series Stranger Things, marketed as Stranger Things 3, was released on July 4th, 2019. The series was created by the Duffer Brothers, who also serve as executive producers along with Shawn Levy, Dan Cohen and Iain Paterson.

The principal cast for the season includes Winona Ryder, David Harbour, Finn Wolfhard, Millie Bobby Brown, Gaten Matarazzo, Caleb McLaughlin, Noah Schnapp, Sadie Sink, Natalia Dyer, Charlie Heaton, Joe Keery, Dacre Montgomery, Maya Hawke, Priah Ferguson, and Cara Buono, while the recurring cast includes Brett Gelman, Francesca Reale, Cary Elwes, Alec Utgoff, and Andrey Ivchenko. The season received positive reviews from critics, and received eight nominations at the 72nd Primetime Emmy Awards, including Outstanding Drama Series, and won for Outstanding Sound Editing for a Comedy or Drama Series (One Hour).

== Premise ==
In the summer of 1985, the popular new Starcourt Mall has caused many of Hawkins' other stores to close. Jim Hopper intervenes in Mike Wheeler's relationship with his adopted daughter Eleven, and Eleven becomes friends with Max Mayfield. Still recovering from Bob Newby's death, Joyce Byers considers moving out of Hawkins with her children. Magnetic disruptions lead her to believe that the Upside Down has returned, however, and she enlists Hopper's help in uncovering the cause. While Mike and Lucas Sinclair attempt to repair the former's relationship with Eleven, Will Byers begins experiencing premonitions from the Upside Down even though Eleven closed the original gate, believing the Mind Flayer, a many-armed shadow creature from the Upside Down which previously possessed him, is still alive in Hawkins. As Nancy Wheeler and Jonathan Byers investigate the effects of the Mind Flayer's influence, Dustin Henderson, Steve Harrington, newcomer Robin Buckley, and Erica Sinclair begin investigating a potential Soviet infiltration of Hawkins. Meanwhile, Max's stepbrother Billy Hargrove is taken over by the Mind Flayer, which possesses other citizens of Hawkins to fulfill its plan.

== Cast and characters ==
=== Main ===
- Winona Ryder as Joyce Byers
- David Harbour as Jim Hopper
- Finn Wolfhard as Mike Wheeler
- Millie Bobby Brown as Eleven / Jane Hopper
- Gaten Matarazzo as Dustin Henderson
- Caleb McLaughlin as Lucas Sinclair
- Noah Schnapp as Will Byers
- Sadie Sink as Max Mayfield
- Natalia Dyer as Nancy Wheeler
- Charlie Heaton as Jonathan Byers
- Joe Keery as Steve Harrington
- Dacre Montgomery as Billy Hargrove
- Maya Hawke as Robin Buckley
- Priah Ferguson as Erica Sinclair
- Cara Buono as Karen Wheeler

=== Recurring ===
- Jake Busey as Bruce Lowe
- Joe Chrest as Ted Wheeler
- Catherine Curtin as Claudia Henderson
- Andrey Ivchenko as Grigori
- Michael Park as Tom Holloway
- Yasen Peyankov as Russian scientist
- Francesca Reale as Heather Holloway
- Alec Utgoff as Alexei
- Brett Gelman as Murray Bauman
- Cary Elwes as Larry Kline
- Peggy Miley as Doris Driscoll
- Holly Morris as Janet Holloway

=== Notable guests ===
- Sean Astin as Bob Newby
- Rob Morgan as Officer Powell
- John Reynolds as Officer Callahan
- Randy Havens as Scott Clarke
- Tinsley and Anniston Price as Holly Wheeler
- Caroline Arapoglou as Winnie Kline
- Allyssa Brooke as Candice
- Will Chase as Neil Hargrove
- Christopher Convery as young Billy
- Jacey Sink as young Max
- Beth Riesgraf as Billy's mother
- Susan Shalhoub Larkin as Florence
- John Vodka as General Stepanov
- Arthur Darbinyan as Dr. Zharkov
- Misha Kuznetsov as Commander Ozerov
- Gabriella Pizzolo as Suzie
- Paul Reiser as Sam Owens
- Matty Cardarople as Keith

== Episodes ==
No. overall	No. in season	Title	Directed by	Written by	Original release date
18	1	"Chapter One: Suzie, Do You Copy?"	The Duffer Brothers	The Duffer Brothers	July 4, 2019
In June 1984, scientists in the Soviet Union attempt to open a new gate to the Upside Down but fail. A year later, around late June 1985, in Hawkins, the popularity of the new Starcourt Mall has forced many local businesses to close, angering townspeople. Eleven and Mike Wheeler have begun a romantic relationship, much to Jim Hopper's chagrin; he later threatens Mike into agreeing not to see her. Dustin Henderson returns from summer camp and, with the help of Lucas Sinclair, Max Mayfield, and Will Byers, sets up a radio tower to contact his new girlfriend from camp, Suzie. Dustin's friends leave, and he intercepts a Russian radio transmission. Will senses that the Mind Flayer may still be alive. Rats flock to a mill and explode into an organic mass. Nancy Wheeler and Jonathan Byers work as interns for the Hawkins Post. Nancy experiences sexism from her older male staff. On his way to a rendezvous with Karen Wheeler, Billy Hargrove, Max's older stepbrother, is run off the road by an unseen creature and dragged inside the mill.
19	2	"Chapter Two: The Mall Rats"	The Duffer Brothers	The Duffer Brothers	July 4, 2019
Billy is released from the mill after the creature induces a vision of the Upside Down, which includes a doppelgänger. Following Hopper's threat, Mike lies to Eleven, leading her to seek Max's advice. Dustin reunites with Steve Harrington, who works at the mall's ice cream parlor with Robin Buckley, a former classmate. Nancy and Jonathan investigate the home of Mrs. Driscoll, an elderly woman concerned about rabid rats eating her fertilizer. Eleven and Max bond, going shopping at Starcourt Mall to distract themselves from Mike and Lucas. Tormented by visions and voices, Billy is guided by the creature into kidnapping his fellow lifeguard, Heather Holloway, and bringing her to the creature. Eleven breaks up with Mike after she sees him at the mall and realizes that he has been lying. Joyce tries to figure out why magnets at her home and workplace have stopped working. She goes to the home of Scott Clarke, the kids' science teacher, to ask him why the magnets have stopped functioning, accidentally standing Hopper up for a date. Dustin, Steve, and Robin translate Dustin's intercepted Russian radio message, surmising that it must be a code.
20	3	"Chapter Three: The Case of the Missing Lifeguard"	Shawn Levy	William Bridges	July 4, 2019
While having a sleepover with Max, Eleven jokingly uses her powers to spy on Mike, Lucas, and Will. She later spies on a suspicious and strange Billy, who senses her presence. She and Max discover that Heather has gone missing. Nancy and Jonathan find reports of missing fertilizer and strange behavior among rats across town, and they discover Mrs. Driscoll herself eating fertilizer in her home. After his attempts to play Dungeons and Dragons like old times, Will fights with Mike and Lucas as they are upset over Eleven and Max. He retreats to Castle Byers, and upon recalling his childhood memories with his friends, he destroys it. Robin decodes the Russian communication, which leads to a shipment arriving at Starcourt that night precisely at 21:45; she, Steve, and Dustin spot armed Russian soldiers handling the delivery. Joyce forces Hopper to go to the abandoned Hawkins Lab to answer queries they have about the falling magnets; when they investigate, Hopper is attacked by Grigori, a Russian soldier. Eleven and Max track down Billy and Heather at the home of Heather's parents. After they leave, Billy and Heather subdue her parents, which Will senses while Mike and Lucas find him, and he reveals to them that the Mind Flayer has returned.
21	4	"Chapter Four: The Sauna Test"	Shawn Levy	Kate Trefry	July 4, 2019
Billy and Heather bring her parents to the mill, where they are possessed by the Mind Flayer, now a physical creature composed of flesh from the rats. Hopper recalls Grigori meeting with town mayor Larry Kline; he and Joyce force Kline to reveal that Starcourt Mall is a Russian front for buying abandoned properties across Hawkins. At Starcourt, Dustin, Steve, and Robin, alongside Lucas' sister Erica, discover that the mall's loading dock is an elevator, which traps them beneath the mall. Nancy and Jonathan are fired by their boss Tom, Heather's father, for harassing Mrs. Driscoll; Nancy visits Mrs. Driscoll at the hospital out of suspicion and watches her become possessed by the Mind Flayer. Will reveals his connection with the Mind Flayer to Eleven, Mike, Lucas, and Max, speculating that it has possessed Billy. They devise a plan to trap Billy in the pool's sauna to confirm he is possessed, but Billy escapes and nearly kills them until Eleven subdues him. Billy returns to the mill, where dozens of townspeople have since been possessed by the Mind Flayer.
22	5	"Chapter Five: The Flayed"	Uta Briesewitz	Paul Dichter	July 4, 2019
Hopper and Joyce search one of the abandoned properties, discovering a hidden laboratory. Grigori arrives to kill them, and they narrowly escape with a hostage–a Russian scientist named Alexei–in tow. Dustin, Steve, Robin, and Erica arrive in a Russian lab underneath Starcourt and hide from Russian soldiers unloading crates from the elevator. Attempting to find a communications room, the group discover a large testing area where scientists try to force open a portal to the Upside Down. As Alexei does not speak English, Hopper and Joyce take him to Murray–the only Russian speaker they know–to translate. Grigori tries to follow them but loses the trail. Nancy and Jonathan regroup with Eleven, Mike, Lucas, Max, and Will and then theorize that Billy and Driscoll are both possessed by the Mind Flayer, who uses them to "flay" (possess) people to create an army. The group decides to visit Mrs. Driscoll at the hospital to learn more but discovers she is missing. They are attacked by Tom and Bruce, who are now part of the Flayed and dissolve into a single organic mass resembling the Mind Flayer after Nancy and Jonathan kill them.
23	6	"Chapter Six: E Pluribus Unum"	Uta Briesewitz	Curtis Gwinn	July 4, 2019
Eleven, who had just then reconciled with Mike, uses her powers to incapacitate the bio-massed Mind Flayer, forcing it to flee to the mill. In the Russian lab beneath Starcourt, Steve and Robin are captured, drugged, and interrogated, but Dustin and Erica manage to rescue them. With Murray translating, Hopper and Joyce hold Alexei hostage, forcing him to reveal that the Russians are attempting to access the Upside Down and that they are opening a portal beneath Starcourt. Hopper calls Owens to warn the U.S. Government of the threat, but Joyce insists they return to Hawkins immediately, fearing that their kids may be involved. Grigori corners Kline at Hawkins' Independence Day fair, demanding he step up efforts to find Hopper. Mike argues with Max about relying on Eleven's powers and inadvertently admits his ongoing love for Eleven. To find the Mind Flayer, Eleven uses her powers in an attempt to psychically communicate with Billy, learning of his traumatic childhood and finding the Mind Flayer at the mill. Billy senses Eleven's presence, giving the Mind Flayer access to her location, and reveals that the Mind Flayer plans to kill her to avenge her closing the gate. The Flayed converge on the mill, dissolving into an enormous organic mass and merging with the Mind Flayer.
24	7	"Chapter Seven: The Bite"	The Duffer Brothers	The Duffer Brothers	July 4, 2019
Eleven and the others determine that the Mind Flayer is coming for her, since she was the one who previously closed the gate and thus its only threat. Will senses the Mind Flayer approaching. The Mind Flayer attacks the group, and though Eleven defends the others, the Mind Flayer manages to injure her before they flee. Dustin and Erica hide a drugged Steve and Robin in the Starcourt movie theater. Eleven's group breaks into a supermarket to help treat her wounds and gather more supplies. Dustin contacts them over a walkie-talkie to try to explain the situation before he loses battery power. Eleven uses her powers to find Dustin, and the group take off for the mall. Steve admits that he has feelings for Robin, but she comes out to him as a lesbian. Hopper's group make their way to the fairgrounds in Hawkins to find the children, where they are spotted by Kline, who alerts the Russians. Grigori fatally shoots Alexei in front of Murray. Murray, Hopper, and Joyce evade several Soviet agents and learn the agents are looking for the children at the mall. Eleven's group arrives at the mall in time to stop the Russians from shooting Dustin's group. Exhausted and in pain, Eleven collapses, her wound pulsing.
25	8	"Chapter Eight: The Battle of Starcourt"	The Duffer Brothers	The Duffer Brothers	July 4, 2019
Eleven rids herself of the piece of the Mind Flayer embedded in her wound, rendering her powerless. Hopper's group arrives, and plans are made to take Eleven's group to safety. At the same time, Hopper, Joyce, and Murray destroy the machine, with Dustin and Erica navigating them from his radio tower. Billy and the Mind Flayer trap Eleven's group at the mall. The others attack the Mind Flayer with fireworks as Eleven frees Billy from its control. Billy sacrifices himself to protect Eleven, Mike, and Max. Hopper fights and kills Grigori, getting trapped with the machine in the process. Out of time, Joyce is forced to trigger an explosion, closing the gate, with Hopper seemingly being disintegrated in the process. The Mind Flayer's physical body dies as Dr. Owens arrives with military forces. Three months later, the deaths are covered up, Starcourt is dismantled, and a disgraced Kline is arrested. The Byers family and a still-powerless Eleven prepare to move out of Hawkins. Eleven confesses her love for Mike and they make plans to meet at Thanksgiving. In Kamchatka, Russian guards are instructed to feed a prisoner, but "not the American", (Note: This was later confirmed to be Hopper.) to a captured Demogorgon.

== Production ==
=== Development ===
Shawn Levy noted in November 2016 that he and the Duffer Brothers had already begun planning a potential third season, saying, "We are not gonna be caught off guard and we don't wanna be making stuff up like the day before we have to write it and make it, so we are definitely optimistic and we have started thinking ahead." The Duffer Brothers anticipated having about four to five seasons to work with, but do want to "have a really finite ending" while the series is still at a height of success, according to Matt, rather than letting it draw out indefinitely. In August 2017, the Duffer Brothers confirmed there would be a third season, with the likelihood of one more season following that, with Ross saying, "We're thinking it will be a four-season thing and then out". However, executive producer Shawn Levy later suggested that either four or five total seasons were possibilities, claiming that "the truth is, we're definitely going four seasons and there's very much the possibility of a fifth. Beyond that, it becomes, I think, very unlikely." Matt Duffer later commented that no official decision has been made, claiming that "It's hard, like four seems short, five seems long. So I don't know what to do." In December 2017, Netflix officially confirmed that they had green lit the third season, consisting of eight episodes. Levy also confirmed that a fourth season was "definitely happening" and that there was potential for a fifth season. A year later, the episode titles for season three were revealed, along with confirming the season would be named Stranger Things 3, similar to the second season.

=== Writing ===
Writing for the third season began before the second season's premiere, with a good portion being written in twelve-to-fourteen-hour bouts by the series' creators. It was reported that Netflix wanted both the third and fourth seasons to be written simultaneously as to facilitate a back-to-back production schedule, for the actors were aging faster than their on-screen characters, but both the Duffer Brothers and producer Shawn Levy opted to focus only on the third season to ensure it was better-developed and more fleshed out.

In terms of narrative, Levy said the season would be less about Will, saying, "We're not going to put Will through hell for a third season in a row. He'll be dealing with stuff, but he won't be at rock bottom... We're [going to be] dealing with forces of evil that are new." David Harbour has said that the third season also draws heavily from the film Fletch. Both Levy and Natalia Dyer echo sentiments that this season's events will be more adult-oriented, with Dyer calling the season's narrative "...Bigger, darker, [and] scarier."

The early pitch documents for the season featured a scene that had the Mind Flayer monster rampaging through the Hawkins Fourth of July Parade, but the idea was later scrapped as the scripts were written.

=== Casting ===
The third season sees Ryder, Harbour, Wolfhard, Brown, Matarazzo, McLaughlin, Schnapp, Sink, Dyer, Heaton, Buono, Keery, and Montgomery return. In March 2018, it was announced that Priah Ferguson had been promoted to the main cast following her recurring role in the second season, and that Maya Hawke has been cast as Robin, a new lead who's been described as an "alternative girl". Hawke's character was later revealed to be Steve's co-worker at the Scoops Ahoy ice cream parlor in the newly built Starcourt Mall. Cary Elwes and Jake Busey's castings were announced in April 2018; Elwes was cast as Mayor Kline, a "classic '80s politician – more concerned with his own image than with the people of the small town he governs," and Busey as Bruce, a shifty reporter who works for the Hawkins Post. Francesca Reale was cast as Heather, a popular lifeguard at the community pool. As of September 2018, casting had still not been completed for the season, which at that point had been shooting for five months and was less than two months from completion. Carmen Cuba, the show's casting director, attributed the slower-than-usual casting process to the heightened secrecy of the plot paired with certain roles' shifting characterizations and importance.

For the third season, it was reported that several of the cast members would receive pay raises. Ryder and Harbour received an increase to $350,000 an episode from $150,000 and $80,000 respectively; Wolfhard, Matarazzo, McLaughlin, and Schnapp earned a pay increase to over $200,000 an episode, possibly as much as $250,000, a significant increase from the reported $20,000 they had made in season one (later increased by $60,000); and Dyer, Heaton, and Keery received approximately $150,000 an episode. Brown's wage increase was not disclosed but was estimated to be bigger than that of her fellow younger co-stars. Some sources suggest she made at least $250,000 and may have received between $300,000 and $350,000 per episode.

=== Filming ===
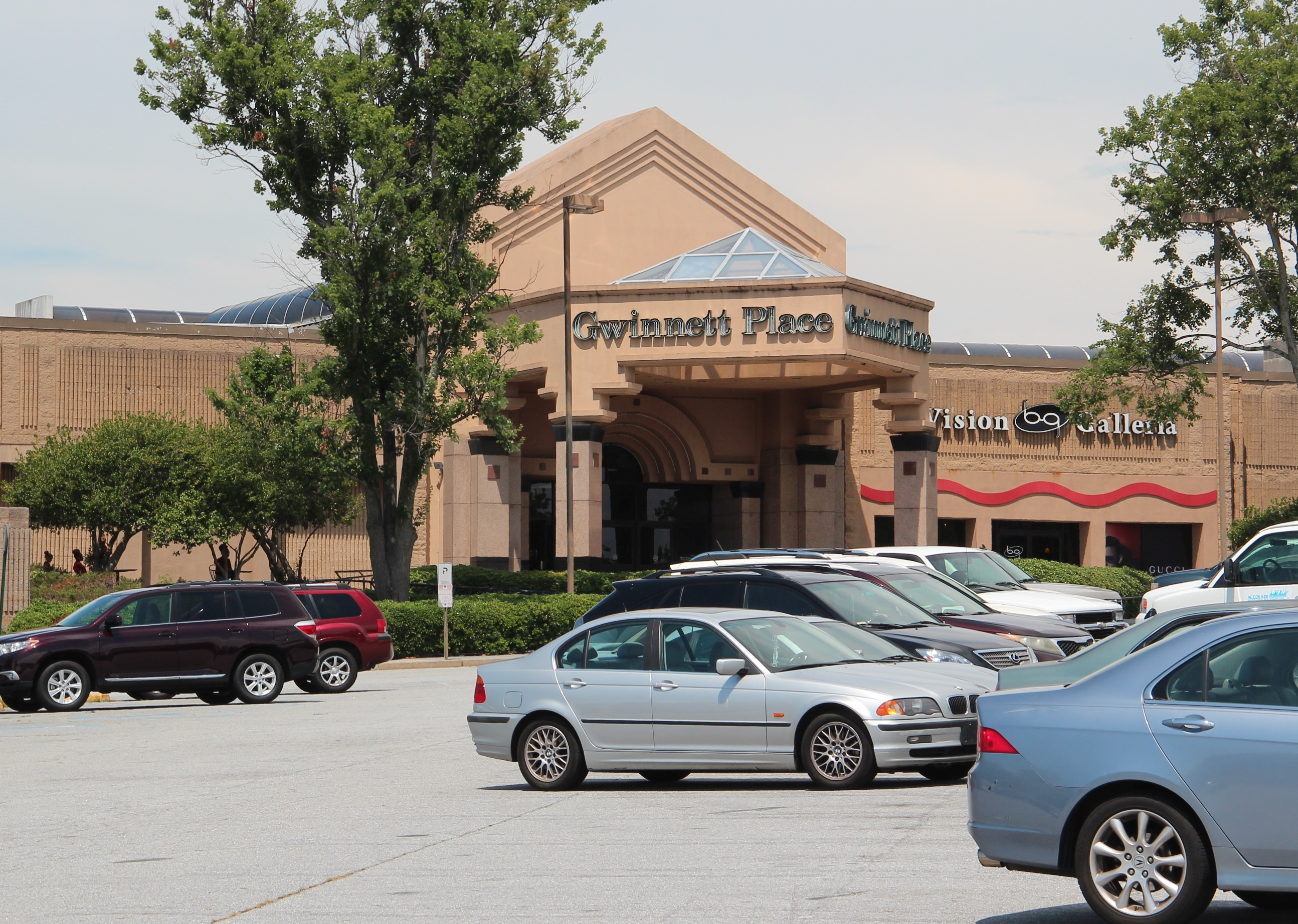
Gwinnett Place Mall stood in as the fictional Starcourt Mall for the filming of the third season.

Filming for the third season officially began on April 23, 2018. Jackson, Georgia remained as primary filming area for scenes in Hawkins' downtown area. The South Bend Pool in Atlanta served as the Hawkins community pool. The major setpiece of the season, Starcourt Mall, was filmed at a re-dressed Gwinnett Place Mall near Duluth, Georgia. The production team had searched around Georgia for a dead mall, one either closed or with significantly reduced vacancy, for film, and found Gwinnett was nearly perfect, having been built in 1984 and thus having the staples of construction from malls in that period. They secured a portion of the mall that had been vacant for some time, redressing the storefronts and food court to feature brands of the 80s, paying attention to which stores likely had made it to Indiana by 1985. Outside "Scoops Ahoy!", a fictional store, they had to make one exception for "Glamour Shots", which was a real chain of photo studios but did not come to malls until after 1985; as a scene of Eleven and Max enjoying a photo shoot was a necessary plot element, the design team created a similar photo studio but with a new fictitious name. Not only did they recreate the facade of each of the storefronts, but they worked to fully stock them as well, in anticipation of any last-minute filming ideas the Duffers may have had. A custom-built grid cloth was employed to completely block sunlight from entering the atrium of the food court to enable filming night scenes during the day.

In addition to the aforementioned sets, filming also occurred at pre-existing structures dressed as the Hawkins town hall and Mayor Kline's house. The production also used a total of seven sound stages, with an average of three sets per stage. To create the "black void", the visual manifestation of Eleven's telepathic ruminations, filming took place in a pool that was "painted black [and filled] with about an inch of water, [and was] surrounded by 270 degrees of duvetyne around thirty feet high". The void's look was tweaked slightly for the third season and shooting in the newer, smaller space required a 50-foot (15 m) Technocrane and two boom operators. An empty field was used to film the scenes set at the Hawkins Fun Fair, with the crew arriving just three weeks prior to the opening of a previously booked medieval fair. Period-appropriate carnival rides were trucked into the set from locations across the country, and the crew retrofitted the rides' modern lighting with bulbs that would have been used in the 1980s.

On September 27, 2018, Brown was spotted filming an emotional scene with stunt doubles and a child dressed in a baseball uniform at a beach in Malibu, California. Filming for the third season concluded on November 12, 2018. Regarding the lengthy hiatus between the second and third seasons, Netflix programming executive Cindy Holland noted "[the Duffer Brothers and Shawn Levy] understand the stakes are high. They want to deliver something bigger and better than last year. I think it's going to be a fantastic season. It will be worth the wait."

=== Visual effects ===
Heading into production for the first season of Stranger Things, the Duffer Brothers intended on shooting a number of special effects using practical methods. However, due to issues with the deployment of the practical effects on-set, coupled with a dissatisfaction with the results of the filmed practical material, The Duffer Brothers became much more keen on utilizing digitally-produced special effects for the second season, and even more so for the third season. During pre-production, the Duffers sat down with Senior VFX Supervisor Paul Graff, production designer Chris Trujillo, and senior concept illustrator Michael Maher to plan out the digital visual effects for the season. One of the most important topics of discussion was the design of the "corporeal" manifestation of the "Shadow Monster/Mindflayer", which the Duffers wanted to be cognizant of the titular "Thing" from John Carpenter's 1982 science fiction horror film The Thing. To emulate this decided look, the group decided the creature should have "some real weight and, consequently, a different new feel for [the animation], including specularity and moisture," an aesthetic that also translated to the "Tom/Bruce" monster that attacks Nancy at the hospital.

The team for season three found it important for the actors to have some sort of on-set physical guide to interact with the large would-be digital entities, as money wasn't budgeted for any sort of costly on-set augmented reality previsualization renderings. Graff noted it was impractical and too expensive to 3D print a rough replica of the physical "Shadow Monster/Mindflayer", as had been done with creatures in the previous season, especially considering the monster is essentially "something the size of a T-Rex invading a shopping mall." A one-hundred pound "zeppelin-shaped creature shell" was initially constructed for the actors to interact with, but it too was deemed impractical and was scrapped. Graff eventually went out and purchased "the largest object [he] could think of" — a blow-up beach ball — and taped it to the end of a twenty-foot boom pole so he could "puppeteer the 'head' enough to provide an eyeline for the actors while also giving camera operators a shot at framing for and tracking the creature's movements." Graff employed a much more unique means to visualize the "Tom/Bruce" monster during filming since the extremely erratic and complicated lighting situation of the scenes that it was featured in mounted a number of potential hardships to be faced during postproduction work:

I came up with the idea of having a stunt guy wearing this giant silver ball helmet while standing in for an incarnation of the monster that was 6-feet or 7-feet tall. This helmet let us see the variance in brightness of the lights from frame to frame. I told assistant stunt coordinator Ken Barefield that I needed him to really be that monster, conveying all that evil energy. 'I need you to roar – and you can't let yourself be intimidated by the fact you're wearing a ridiculous red spandex suit with a giant silver ball helmet.' He told me, 'Don't worry, Paul, I've got this – I'll deliver for you' – and then he sure did. The lights flicker and go out, and when they come back on, this guy is screaming at the top of his lungs, charging like a bull down the hallway. It looked completely absurd, and yet at the same time, it was really cool, one of the most amazing moments of the year for me.

=== Music ===
The original soundtrack album for the third season, titled Stranger Things 3, was released digitally on June 28, 2019, via Lakeshore and Invada Records. Like the previous two seasons, the soundtrack was composed by Kyle Dixon and Michael Stein of the electronic band Survive. The album was also released on physical formats such as CD, vinyl, and cassette.

In addition to Dixon and Stein's original soundtrack, the season features several songs selected from the 1980s and earlier eras. Legacy Recordings released a 16-track compilation of these songs on July 5, 2019.

The finale of the episode "E Pluribus Unum", particularly the scenes involving Eleven's telepathic encounter with the Mind Flayer-possessed Billy, contains excerpts of "Confrontation and Rescue" from the second act of Satyagraha by Philip Glass.

Of note was the use of "The NeverEnding Story", the theme to the 1984 film of the same name, which is used in the final episode when Suzie refuses to provide the critical code until Dustin sings it to her. The Duffers had wanted to introduce Suzie into the show's narrative in some dramatic fashion while giving Matarazzo, who has sung on Broadway before, a chance to show off his own vocals. Initially, they were planning to use "The Ent and the Entwife" song from The Lord of the Rings, but aware that Amazon Studios were developing its own Lord of the Rings series, decided to change direction. The Duffers credit writer Curtis Gwinn for using "The NeverEnding Story" as the replacement. Matarazzo and Gabriella Pizzolo, the actress playing Suzie and also a seasoned singer on Broadway, were on sets near each other when they sang the song together and were able to harmonize the song as well without the backing music. As their characters were not meant to be in that much synchronization due to being in two different places, the song's backing track and some autotuning were used to blend their singing to their respective settings and the tone of the soundtrack. According to the cast and to composers Kyle Dixon and Michael Stein, the song became an earworm for many of the cast on the day that scene was filmed. Later in the episode, Lucas and Max, played by McLaughlin and Sink, sing the song in duet back to Dustin to mock him; both McLaughlin and Sink also had experience in Broadway musicals. As a result of its appearance in the series, "The NeverEnding Story" drew an 800% increase in viewership and streams on YouTube and Spotify over the days following the initial broadcast, putting Limahl, the song's artist, briefly back in the spotlight.

== Marketing ==
Promotion for the third season began with the first day of production, when Netflix released a video featuring the cast as they met for the season's first script read-through. On July 16, 2018, the first teaser trailer for the season was released. The teaser, which is the first to feature footage shot for the new season, is styled as an in-universe commercial for the newly built Starcourt Mall, one of the main settings for the season's events. The "commercial" lists some of the stores found in the mall as well as restaurants in the "state-of-the-art" food court, and closes with Steve (Joe Keery) and Robin (Maya Hawke) saying "Ahoy!" during a short plug for one of the food court's establishments, an ice cream parlor called Scoops Ahoy. On December 9, 2018, during an appearance at the 2018 Comic Con Experience at the São Paulo Expo in São Paulo, Brazil, Noah Schnapp, Sadie Sink, and Caleb McLaughlin presented a new teaser which revealed the titles of the season's eight episodes. Hours later, the teaser was released online across all of the official Stranger Things social media accounts.

On December 31, pedestrians in New York City's Times Square noticed a video playing on a loop advertising a special announcement "sponsored" by the Starcourt Mall. According to the video, the announcement was slated to be aired on the fictional ABC network affiliate WIYZ. At midnight EST, Netflix released a new teaser announcing the release date of the season to be July 4, 2019. The teaser utilized footage from Dick Clark's New Year's Rockin' Eve 1984, specifically the countdown to the New Year. As the countdown commenced, the video slowly turned upside down and became fuzzy, and Mike could be heard calling out for Eleven as the video cut in between different recordings of computers running MS-DOS. The season's first poster, featuring a menacing creature slowly approaching the cast while they are enjoying Independence Day festivities, was released concurrently with the teaser.

On March 19, 2019, the official Stranger Things social media accounts posted a short clip of rats scurrying through a dilapidated industrial area with the caption "It's almost feeding time." This turned out to be a prelude to the release of stills and the first official trailer the next day on March 20. The trailer quickly became the most-viewed video on Netflix's YouTube channel, amassing 22 million views in the first week of its release. On May 21, the first clip from the season was released in tandem with cast posters. The clip, which features Billy flirting with Karen Wheeler at the local pool, includes notable references to the early-1980s comedy films Caddyshack and Fast Times at Ridgemont High. Netflix released the final trailer on June 20, 2019.

In July 2019, Finn Wolfhard and Caleb McLaughlin took part in a Q&A session at the Open'er Festival in Gdynia, Poland. The festival also boasted a replica of the Palace Arcade filled with retro coin-ops – such as Space Invaders, Pac-Man, Donkey Kong and Dig Dug.

=== Tie-ins ===
Netflix partnered with around 75 companies to produce tie-in products to promote the third season. For many of these deals, there was no financial exchange between Netflix and the third parties, with Netflix allowing the third-parties to generate their own marketing buzz for their products while helping to promote Stranger Things. Some of the more notable tie-ins include:

- Swedish apparel retailer H&M offered a clothing collection that includes pieces worn on-screen by several of the series' actors on May 24, 2019. The advertisement campaign for the clothing and accessory lines features Dacre Montgomery (Billy) as a model and revolves around his character's summer job as a lifeguard.
- The Coca-Cola Company revived their ill-received New Coke soft drink for a limited time production run in the month leading up to the season's release. The unpopular soft drink was released around the time frame of the season's setting, and a number of episodes featured the beverage prominently placed within the frame. New Coke was sold at special upside-down vending machines in some United States cities and through Coca-Cola's web store.
- Ice cream chain Baskin-Robbins started offering Stranger Things-inspired menu items in the months prior to the season's release, and at the launch of the third season, several Baskin-Robbins stores across the United States and Canada were made up into the fictional "Scoops Ahoy!" ice cream parlor in the show for about two weeks.
- Fast food chain Burger King started serving special themed 'upside down' Whoppers as a reference to the Upside Down (an alternative universe in the story of the show), including special edition items sold at 11 special locations in the weeks leading up to the premiere, including special ketchup packets displaying a nose in reference to the nose bleeding of the character, Eleven. Burger King also promoted their restaurant commercials, cups and boxes in a special 1980s theme as a tie-in with Coca-Cola. The restaurant was also featured in the food court of the Starcourt Mall.
- In the week leading up to the season's release, Microsoft teased "Windows 1.0", the company's first graphic operating system introduced in 1985. Microsoft released this mock version of "Windows 1.0" as an app for Windows 10 on July 8, 2019. The app features a similar interface as the original software, with various Easter eggs to the series scattered through the app.
- Netflix partnered with Epic Games to include Stranger Things tie-ins into Fortnite Battle Royale around the premiere of the third season.

== Video game ==
A video game adaptation titled Stranger Things 3: The Game was released hours after the third season premiered on July 4, 2019. It was developed by BonusXP and published by Netflix. The game was criticized by reviewers for being an exact scene-by-scene replica of the season.

== Reception ==
=== Audience viewership ===
==== Netflix ratings ====
Within four days of its release, Netflix reported that over 40.7 million accounts had seen at least 70% of one episode of the third season, a record viewership for any Netflix program, while 18.2 million had seen the entire season within the time. Netflix reported in October 2019 that over 64 million households had watched Stranger Things 3 within the first four weeks of its release.

==== Nielsen ratings ====
Nielsen ratings recorded viewership data for those who viewed the series within the United States on a TV set; the data does not account for mobile, tablet, and PC devices, nor viewers outside of the United States.

Nielsen ratings
No.	Title	Release date	Same day viewership		Three day viewership		Refs
No.	Title	Release date	Persons 2+ rating	Persons 2+ (AMA (Note: Average minute audience (AMA) is the average number of individuals or (homes or target group) viewing a TV channel, which is calculated per minute during a specified period of time over the program duration.) in millions)	Persons 2+ rating	Persons 2+ (AMA in millions)	Refs
1	"Chapter One: Suzie, Do You Copy?"	July 4, 2019	2.9	8.86	6.3	19.16	
2	"Chapter Two: The Mall Rats"	July 4, 2019	2.2	6.75	5.8	17.61	
3	"Chapter Three: The Case of the Missing Lifeguard"	July 4, 2019	1.6	5.03	5.2	15.92	
4	"Chapter Four: The Sauna Test"	July 4, 2019	1.2	3.63	4.6	13.93	
5	"Chapter Five: The Flayed"	July 4, 2019	0.9	2.72	3.9	12.01	
6	"Chapter Six: E Pluribus Unum"	July 4, 2019	0.7	2.11	3.5	10.77	
7	"Chapter Seven: The Bite"	July 4, 2019	0.4	1.18	2.4	7.35	
8	"Chapter Eight: The Battle of Starcourt"	July 4, 2019	0.4	1.13	2.9	8.70	

=== Critical response ===
On Rotten Tomatoes, the third season received an approval rating of 89% based on 141 reviews and an average rating of 7.9/10. The site's critical consensus states, "Vibrant and charming, Stranger Things transforms itself into a riveting—if familiar—summer ride that basks in its neon-laden nostalgia without losing sight of the rich relationships that make the series so endearing." Metacritic, which uses a weighted average, gave the season a score of 72 out of 100 based on 28 critics, indicating "generally favorable reviews".

Writing for the New Statesman, Emily Bootle considered the third season an improvement on the second, stating that the series "returned to strength" after a "confusing" second season and that "season three has largely brought back what made the show unique in the first place". Hugh Montgomery at the BBC awarded the season the full five stars, describing the third season as "an exhilarating example of a franchise hitting new heights that Hollywood would do well to learn from."

On the dissenting side, Darren Franich of Entertainment Weekly criticized the season for looking like a Reagan-era pop culture mixtape. Ed Power of The Telegraph blamed Duffers for refusing "to stray from The Goonies (1985)-meets-Stephen King formula" and recycling their "well-worn bag of retro references to increasingly underwhelming effect", producing the "limpest" season so far. His opinion was echoed by Hank Stuever of The Washington Post, who felt "heartbroken" for "the Duffers working so hard to re-create an elusive vibe" of the 1980s with a "mishmash of ingredients" only to fail to create a fully entertaining show. Writing for National Review, Daniel Payne criticized the season's "sloppy storytelling" and "cornball humor" compared to prior seasons, claiming that it was "frenetic and bewildering where the first two seasons were slow, careful, and rewarding in crafting their plots."

=== Accolades ===
As part of the 2019 Teen Choice Awards, the series received a nomination for Choice Summer TV Series for the season. Caleb McLaughlin, Finn Wolfhard, Gaten Matarazzo, and Noah Schnapp were all nominated for Choice Summer TV Actor, while Millie Bobby Brown was nominated for Choice Summer TV actress. The series, Schnapp, and Brown all won awards in their respective categories.
