= Chapter Three =

Chapter Three refers to a third chapter in a book.

Chapter Three, Chapter 3, or Chapter III may also refer to:

== Music ==
=== Albums ===
- Chapter III (Agathodaimon album), 2003
- Chapter III (Allure album), 2004
- Chapter III (3T album), 2015
- Chapter 3 (Queensberry album)
- Chapter 3 (g.o.d album)
- Chapter 3: The Flesh, a 2005 album by Syleena Johnson
- Chapter III: Downfall, 2023 album by Ad Infinitum
- Chapter Three: Viva Emiliano Zapata, 1974 album by Gato Barbieri
- Chapter Three: Yellow, 2017 EP by Bea Miller

=== Songs ===
- "Chapter III", a song from Revelations, a 1982 album by Killing Joke

== Television ==
- "Chapter 3" (American Horror Story)
- "Chapter 3" (Eastbound & Down)
- "Chapter 3" (House of Cards)
- "Chapter 3" (Legion)
- "Chapter 3" (Star Wars: Clone Wars), an episode of Star Wars: Clone Wars
- "Chapter 3" (Uncoupled)
- "Chapter 3: The Sin", an episode of The Mandalorian
- "Chapter 3: The Streets of Mos Espa", an episode of The Book of Boba Fett
- "Chapter 3: Survivors", an episode of A Murder at the End of the World
- "Chapter Three" (Boston Public)
- "Chapter Three: Body Double", an episode of Riverdale
- "Chapter Three: Free Scones", an episode of Special
- "Chapter Three: Make the Unsafe Choice", an episode of Barry
- "Chapter Three: The Trial of Sabrina Spellman", an episode of Chilling Adventures of Sabrina
- "Chapter Three: What Becomes of the Broken Hearted", an episode of Katy Keene
- Episodes of Stranger Things:
  - "Chapter Three: Holly, Jolly", season 1
  - "Chapter Three: The Pollywog", season 2
  - "Chapter Three: The Case of the Missing Lifeguard", season 3
  - "Chapter Three: The Monster and the Superhero", season 4
  - "Chapter Three: The Turnbow Trap", season 5

== Other uses ==
- Schism of the Three Chapters and Three-Chapter Controversy a sharp disagreement in sixth century Christianity
- K.G.F: Chapter 3, a 2024 Indian Kannada-language action film
- Chapter III Court
- Chapter III of the United Nations Charter
