= Stranger Things: Music from the Netflix Original Series, Season 3 =

Soundtrack album by Various artists
- Released: July 5, 2019
- Genre: Soundtrack
- Length: 56:15
- Label: Legacy Recordings

Stranger Things: Music from the Netflix Original Series, Season 3 is the non-original composition soundtrack companion to the third season of the Netflix series Stranger Things. The album, which includes fifteen popular songs paired with an original cast recording from the third season, was released on July 5, 2019, by Legacy Recordings to coincide with the release of the third season. Certain variant special vinyl editions of the album come with an additional 7-inch single and other features, such as posters, stickers, puzzles, and more.

== Track listing ==
No.	Title	Performers(s)	Length
1.	"Baba O'Riley" (ConfidentialMX Remix)	The Who	2:34
2.	"Things Can Only Get Better"	Howard Jones	3:54
3.	"Material Girl"	Madonna	4:00
4.	"Cold as Ice"	Foreigner	3:19
5.	"She's Got You"	Patsy Cline	2:58
6.	"R.O.C.K. in the U.S.A. (A Salute to 60's Rock)"	John Mellencamp	2:54
7.	"Neutron Dance"	The Pointer Sisters	4:13
8.	"Can't Fight This Feeling"	REO Speedwagon	4:53
9.	"Wake Me Up Before You Go-Go"	Wham!	3:51
10.	"My Bologna"	"Weird Al" Yankovic	1:59
11.	"Moving in Stereo"	The Cars	4:42
12.	"Never Surrender"	Corey Hart	4:54
13.	"Lovergirl"	Teena Marie	4:21
14.	"Workin' for a Livin'"	Huey Lewis & the News	2:39
15.	"We'll Meet Again"	Vera Lynn	2:59
16.	"Never Ending Story"	Gaten Matarazzo and Gabriella Pizzolo	2:05

== Charts ==
Chart (2019)	Peak position
Australian Albums (ARIA)	73
Belgian Albums (Ultratop Flanders)	134
Belgian Albums (Ultratop Wallonia)	66
French Albums (SNEP)	111
German Albums (Offizielle Top 100)	55
South Korean Albums (Gaon)	82
Spanish Albums (PROMUSICAE)	55
US Billboard 200	125

== Release history ==
Date	Edition(s)	Format(s)	Exclusive retailer(s)	Label	Ref.
July 5, 2019	Standard	CD	—N/a	Legacy Recordings	
July 5, 2019	Standard	Digital download	—N/a	Legacy Recordings	
July 5, 2019	Standard	LP	—N/a	Legacy Recordings	
July 5, 2019	Standard	Cassette	FYE	Legacy Recordings	
July 26, 2019	Alternate cover edition	LP + 7" single	Barnes & Noble	Legacy Recordings	
July 26, 2019	Orange splatter vinyl	LP + 7" single	Urban Outfitters	Legacy Recordings	
July 26, 2019	Purple splatter vinyl	LP + 7" single	Walmart	Legacy Recordings	
July 26, 2019	Red, white and blue splatter vinyl	LP + 7" single	Target	Legacy Recordings	
