= Robin Buckley =

Stranger Things character

- Stranger Things character
- Maya Hawke as Robin Buckley in the third season
- First appearance: "Chapter One: Suzie, Do You Copy?" (2019)
- Last appearance: "Chapter Eight: The Rightside Up" (2025)
- Created by: The Duffer Brothers
- Portrayed by: Maya Hawke

In-universe information
- Full name: Robin Buckley
- Aliases: Rose Weaver; Rockin' Robin; Rebel Robin
- Nicknames: Tweedledee; Rob; Miss Robin; Rockin Robin; Rebel Robin
- Occupation: Member of Hawkins High Marching Band (formerly); Scoops Ahoy employee (formerly); Family Video employee (formerly); Radio DJ
- Family: Richard Buckley (father); Melissa Buckley (mother); Minerva (grandmother)
- Significant other: Vickie Dunne girlfriend
- Home: Hawkins, Indiana, United States
- Nationality: American

Robin Buckley (born March 1968) is a fictional character from the Netflix science fiction horror television series Stranger Things, portrayed by Maya Hawke. The character was introduced in the third season and remained as part of the main cast through to the fifth and final season. Introduced as the snarky, awkward, and loquacious co-worker of Steve Harrington, Robin eventually becomes swept up in his attempts to decipher a Russian radio code and discovers the existence of an alternate dimension known as the Upside Down. Her relationship with Steve eventually develops into a strong bond of friendship, and she becomes a key member of the group going forward.

The character, and Hawke's performance, have been well received by fans and critics, with some referring to her as the third season's breakout character and a fan-favorite. Outside of the show, Robin has appeared in two Stranger Things novels, a video game, and a fictionalized scripted podcast, with Hawke reprising her role.

== Fictional character biography ==
=== Season 3 ===
Robin attends Hawkins High School, where she is a member of the marching band playing the french horn, and is classmates with Steve Harrington, and Nancy, though is somewhat of a loner and social outcast. Robin gets a job at Scoops Ahoy ice cream parlor at Starcourt Mall when it opened in 1985. Steve is also forced to get a job there by his father when he fails to get the grades to attend college. Robin has some animosity towards Steve from their school days and would often tease him during their shifts. She overhears Dustin Henderson tell Steve that he has intercepted a secret Russian radio transmission, and helps them successfully translate it into English. She and Dustin deduce that it is a coded message and discover that it refers to a delivery that is due to be made to the mall that night. Erica Sinclair helps the trio access a secret elevator that leads them to discover a Russian base underneath the mall filled with containers of mysterious green liquid and a rift leading to an alternate dimension that she later discovers is known by Steve and Dustin's group as the Upside Down. Robin and Steve are captured by the Russians, injected with truth serum, and interrogated. While in custody, Robin reflects on how much she resented Steve for his popularity at school and he tells her that he wishes he'd gotten to know her better back then. They are rescued from the base by Dustin and Erica. While recovering from their ordeal, Steve confesses to Robin that he likes her and that spending time with her has been the most enjoyable part of his summer. Robin tells him that she appreciates him as a friend, and reveals that she was not envious of Steve because she had a crush on him, but because he was able to charm her real crush, a girl named Tammy. Despite his initial confusion, Steve realizes that Robin is gay and accepts her, joking that she is too good for Tammy. The group then attempt to find a way out of the mall, and Robin sees Eleven save them by telekinetically throwing a car at the Russians. Robin is then present for the battle against the Mind Flayer, a monster from the Upside Down. Once the Mind Flayer is defeated, Robin learns the truth about the Upside Down, Eleven, and the disappearance of Will Byers. Following the closure of the Starcourt Mall, Robin and Steve get jobs at the town's Family Video store.

=== Season 4 ===
Robin begins to become romantically interested in Vickie Dunne, a fellow member of the marching band but, despite Steve's support, is unsure of how to approach the situation, as she did not know whether Vickie reciprocated her feelings. While working, she and Steve see live news footage reporting on the suspected murder of Hawkins High student Chrissy Cunningham, with Dustin and Max revealing that Dustin's friend Eddie Munson was the prime suspect. The group find Eddie that night, and he maintains that Chrissy died after he saw her levitating into the air and all of her limbs being magically snapped, and that he believes a dark wizard named Vecna is responsible. When Nancy's colleague at the school newspaper dies in similar circumstances, Robin and Nancy visit the library and find an article detailing a massacre that took place in 1956 where Victor Creel, the only survivor, reported that a demon was responsible. The pair then go undercover at Pennhurst Asylum to speak to Victor themselves, and reassured him that they believed his story, encouraging him to reveal his family history to them and expressing that he was saved from the massacre through a piece of music that he was connected to. Robin and Nancy are able to share this information with the others who use it to successfully save Max, Vecna's next victim, from being murdered. They go to Victor's old house to look for clues, and deduce that he is using the version of his house in the Upside Down as his base of operations. Robin, Eddie, Nancy, and Steve enter the Upside Down through an underwater gate and fight of swarms of Demobats and are forced to flee back to the real world through another gate with the aid of Dustin, Lucas, Erica, and Max. Nancy, having briefly been possessed by Vecna, reveals that he is Victor's son Henry, and they make a plan to defeat him by using Max as bait. While preparing, Robin attempts to talk to Vickie, only to see her boyfriend arrive, causing her to walk away feeling dejected. Robin, Nancy, and Steve return to the Upside Down and successfully locate the Creel mansion and attack Vecna using a shotgun and molotov cocktails, but he escapes and completes his ritual, opening multiple gates to the Upside Down in Hawkins and causing a massive earthquake in Hawkins. While assisting in relief efforts, Vickie tells Robin that she broke up with her boyfriend and the two begin bonding over their shared personality traits.

=== Season 5 ===
Following the completion of Vecna's ritual, Hawkins becomes quarantined by the military between 1986 and 1987, who seal the gates with steel plates and tell the locals a false story to keep the truth hidden. Robin takes over the WSQK radio station, calling herself "Rockin' Robin", with Steve working as her producer. She uses her broadcasts to transmit coded messages to the rest of the group and co-ordinate "crawls" of the Upside Down in order to search for Vecna and kill him. The group also use the station as their base of operations. Robin, now dating Vickie, frequently visits her at the hospital where she works as a candy striper. Their relationship is occasionally contentious due to Robin having to lie about her whereabouts so as not to reveal the truth to Vickie. Will accidentally sees the two kissing, and abruptly runs off. When the group discover that Will still has a connection to the Demogorgon hive mind from his time in the Upside Down as a child, Robin suggests using him as a "human antenna" to locate Vecna, though Joyce refuses to put him at risk. They trick Joyce so they can sneak out and head to woods where Will had an earlier vision. Robin asks Will if he saw her with Vickie at the hospital, stating that they are just good friends whose relationship may confuse some people. Will assures her he saw nothing and discovers that Vecna is planning to abduct Derek Turnbow. Robin suggests using drugs to knock out the Turnbow family and remove them from their house so they can set a trap to find Vecna. While searching for drugs at the hospital, Will admits he saw Robin kiss Vickie and asks Robin how she knew Vickie would reciprocate, and Robin shares several anecdotes about their relationship and its beginnings. She also subtly reassures Will about his own sexuality after deducing that he is also gay and tells Will about her old feelings for Tammy and her subsequent coming out to Steve. Robin later takes part in the plan to smuggle Vecna's other targets out of Hawkins, and she and Murray successfully help three children into his truck before they are ambushed by a group of Demogorgons and the children are taken. Will saves Robin's life by psychically killing the Demogorgons, having unlocked a newfound inner strength and self-acceptance as a result of their conversation. After finding out that Max is trapped in Vecna's mindscape, Robin and Lucas head to the hospital, theorizing that she will return to her body once she escapes. When they get there, Robin is confronted by Vickie, who knows she stole drugs and is concerned for her well-being and constant evasiveness. Robin realizes that the military have arrived and is briefly apprehended, but flees with Vickie once Demodogs begin arriving at the hospital, and they are able to warn Lucas to get Max out of her room before the Demodogs can kill her. The four are cornered in the laundry room but are saved by Karen, who detonates an oxygen tank to kill the Demodogs. Robin expresses support to Will when he comes out as gay to the others, with Steve placing a reassuring hand on her shoulder. Now aware of the truth, Vickie joins the group at the radio station where Steve proposes a plan to rescue the children and end Vecna once and for all. Robin joins the group in entering the Upside Down and climbs into the Abyss, helping the others take down the revived Mind Flayer before watching Joyce kill Vecna. Eighteen months later in the spring of 1989, Robin presents a new radio broadcast, detailing that the military have left Hawkins and that everyone has returned to town for the graduation of Will, Mike, Lucas, Dustin, and Max. Later, Robin meets with Steve, Nancy, and Jonathan on the roof of WSQK, and the group promise to stay connected despite their differing life and career paths.

== Development ==
=== Casting ===
Hawke's casting as Robin was announced on March 2, 2018. The press release described the character as "an "alternative girl" bored with her mundane day job. She seeks excitement in her life and gets more than she bargained for when she uncovers a dark secret in Hawkins". Audiences were given a first look at the character on July 16, 2018, in a promotional image featuring Robin and Steve in their Scoops Ahoy uniforms, an outfit Hawke would later go on to call her "superhero costume". Hawke was a self-described "fangirl" of the show and stated of securing the role, "I had a thrilling reaction to the idea I could get to say that dialogue that the Duffer Brothers write so intelligently and so specifically." Casting director Carmen Cuba explained that she knew from her conversations with the Duffer Brothers that Robin was going to be a "demanding role with a lot of dialogue" and that she had to find an "adaptable and verbal actor" for the part. Hawke first came onto Cuba's radar when she asked for recommendations from some of the actors on a film she was working on at the time and that Hawke's name was brought up. Though she didn't end up booking a role in the film, Cuba kept her in mind when later looking for actresses to play Robin.

Francesca Reale revealed in a Reddit Q&A that she had originally auditioned to play Robin but stated that her audition was "so bad it was painful", and that the role was "not the right fit for her". Reale was instead cast as Heather Holloway in the show's third season and later appeared alongside Hawke in the 2022 film Do Revenge.

=== Characterization ===
The character's surname was revealed in a series of cryptic tweets by the show's writers following the release of the third season.

Robin is a lesbian and the first confirmed LGBTQ+ character to appear on Stranger Things. Although Robin was originally written as a new love interest for Steve, that plan changed midway through production of the third season, between episodes four and five. "Throughout filming, we started to feel like she and [Steve] shouldn't get together, and that she's gay. Even when I go back and watch earlier episodes, it just seems like the most obvious decision ever," Hawke said. She noted that playing Robin became a major point of pride for her as an actress, explaining, "the great thing about Stranger Things is it has such a reach and so many people watch it in the middle of the country. Even a little gesture like having a gay character is a big deal." Reflecting on Robin's coming out scene, where she reveals to Steve that she was in love with one of their female classmates, Hawke stated, "it feels wonderful to have a piece of that humanity involved in this giant action-packed drama. It's such an amazing thing the Duffer Brothers did, stopping the whole show — there's an action scene going on [elsewhere in the episode] — and it stops for a seven-minute conversation between two people who really care about each other. It's a really beautiful thing. I feel really lucky that I got to play that." Discussing the character's development, Hawke felt that Robin started the third season with "a lot of hard walls" and that "once these other characters start to reveal themselves to her, and once she gets to be on the front of a mission, her personality really comes through because she feels like herself".

Due to her chemistry with co-star Joe Keery, many fans began shipping Robin and Steve, but Hawke expressed that she preferred that she and Keery were able to play characters with such a strong platonic bond, stating "men and women aren't really allowed to be friends onscreen. There's always this undercurrent of one-sided love or two. It's very refreshing to see a bond between a man and a woman that isn't transactional, that isn't romantic. It's their togetherness that comes as a true friendship in understanding through opposition. Seeing that is almost revolutionary." Robin has been described as an awkward character who "fumbles through the world but lands on her feet", elements Hawke loved to play, explaining "she really allows me to embrace parts of myself that I've often tried to hide. She has this darkness to her, this kind of physical awkwardness, a little bit of a social outcast feeling to her and an intense intelligence. Those are all pieces of my personality, but they're not necessarily the ones that I try to put first" and advised that, as she continued to work on the show, the Duffer Brothers began infusing more of her own personality into Robin.

Hawke described Robin's friendship and mentorship with Will during the show's fifth season as "vital" despite it not being the direction she had predicted for her character in the final season, joking that she still felt like Robin was a new character who wouldn't make sense when not paired with her previously established friends. She highlighted the importance of LGBTQ+ people supporting one another, and felt it was positive growth for the character to be supporting Will through his own journey following her coming out to Steve in season three, advising that "Robin is kind of like mentoring Will in some ways through this season, or really just like trying to see if she could help him start to hear his own voice and start to feel okay with himself". Hawke drew from her own personal experiences with struggling to fit in, and explained that, "this relationship between Robin and Will is kind of about letting people know that if you look hard in a room, you'll find someone who understands you there, find someone you're safe with and that you can trust and that you can talk to and that wants you to find a way to be your full self." She spoke positively of working with Noah Schnapp, and expressed that she was moved by their scenes together.

Alex Masse from Autostraddle wrote an autistic reading of her character, and questioned whether the Duffer Brothers intentionally wrote her as neurodivergent, speaking on issues about representation.

== In other media ==
Robin is the protagonist of the young adult novel Stranger Things: Rebel Robin, which was written by A. R. Capetta and published by Penguin Random House on June 29, 2021. The novel serves as a prequel to the show's third season, a focuses on Robin's life as a struggling sophomore student at Hawkins High. A six episode scripted companion podcast, Rebel Robin: Surviving Hawkins, was released as a tie-in to the novel, with Hawke reprising her role as Robin. The first episode was released on the same day as the novel's publication, with subsequent episodes releasing weekly.

On November 26, 2025, it was announced that another novel, titled Stranger Things: One Way or Another, written by Caitlin Schneiderhan would star Nancy Wheeler and Robin investigating a new mystery in Hawkins in-between the show's fourth and fifth seasons. The novel was published by Random House Worlds on December 2, 2025.

On December 26, 2025, it was revealed that Robin will appear in horror multiplayer video game Dead by Daylight as part of the second chapter of the game's Stranger Things crossover, which released on January 6, 2026.

== Reception ==
=== Awards and nominations ===
For her performance as Robin in season three, Hawke won the Saturn Award for Best Supporting Actress in Streaming Presentation at the 45th Saturn Awards, and was nominated for the Best Supporting Actress in a Streaming Series, Drama award at the 2nd Hollywood Critics Association TV Awards, losing to her co-star Sadie Sink. Alongside the rest of the cast for the third season, she was nominated for the Screen Actors Guild Award for Outstanding Performance by an Ensemble in a Drama Series at the 26th Screen Actors Guild Awards.
