= Chapter III of the United Nations Charter =

Chapter III of the United Nations Charter lays out the principal organs of the United Nations, and announces a gender nondiscrimination policy for United Nations hiring.

== Article 7 ==
They are listed in the same order as the chapters detailing their composition, functions, and powers appear in the Charter. The placement of the General Assembly first in the list probably is due to the founders' intention that the UNGA be the "first branch" or core of the UN system. Chapter III establishes:

- The UN General Assembly;
- The UN Security Council;
- The UN Economic and Social Council;
- The UN Trusteeship Council;
- The International Court of Justice; and
- The UN Secretariat.

== Article 8 ==
Additionally, Chapter III authorizes the establishment of subsidiary bodies to these organs, which are typically also authorized in the chapters relating to those principal organs. Chapter III also has an equal opportunity provision banning "restrictions on the eligibility of men and women to participate in any capacity and under conditions of equality in its principal and subsidiary organs." Chapter III sets up a more complex organizational structure than Article 2 of the Covenant of the League of Nations, which simply provided, "The action of the League under this Covenant shall be effected through the instrumentality of an Assembly and of a Council, with a permanent Secretariat," establishing a three-organ system as opposed to a six-organ system.
