= Max Mayfield (Stranger Things) =

Stranger Things character

- Stranger Things character
- Sadie Sink as Max Mayfield in the fifth season
- First appearance: "Chapter One: MADMAX" (2017)
- Created by: The Duffer Brothers
- Portrayed by: Sadie Sink; Jacey Sink (young, season 3); Belle Henry (young, season 4)
- Voiced by: Jolie Hoang-Rappaport (Tales from '85)

In-universe information
- Full name: Maxine Mayfield
- Nicknames: MADMAX; Red; Zoomer
- Family: Sam Mayfield (father); Susan Hargrove (mother); Neil Hargove (step-father); Billy Hargrove (step-brother; deceased)
- Significant other: Lucas Sinclair (boyfriend)
- Relatives: Jack (uncle)
- Home: San Diego, California, United States (prior to season 2); Hawkins, Indiana, United States
- Nationality: American

Maxine "Max" Mayfield is a fictional character from the Netflix science fiction horror television series Stranger Things, portrayed by Sadie Sink. The character was introduced in the second season and remained as part of the main cast through to the fifth and final season.

== Fictional character biography ==
=== Season 2 ===
Max is a tomboy with interests of skateboarding, arcade games, and horror movies and is a tough and independent girl. Following her parents' divorce and her mother's re-marriage, Max moves to Hawkins in 1984 alongside her erratic step-brother Billy Hargrove and enrolls at Hawkins Middle School, where she joins the same class as Will Byers, Mike Wheeler, Lucas Sinclair, and Dustin Henderson. The boys later find out that Max, under her alias MADMAX, is responsible for beating Dustin's high score on Dig Dug at the local arcade, causing Dustin and Lucas to begin developing feelings for her. She is initially resistant to joining the friend group, but eventually joins them in trick-or-treating, where she witnesses Will have an "episode" and becomes suspicious when the boys trying to cover up the reasons why he is behaving so strangely.

Lucas ultimately reveals to her the existence of an alternate dimension known as the Upside Down, and how Will was hunted and taken there by a Demogorgon, how the scientists at Hawkins Lab are helping to cover it all up, and how the boys were aided by Eleven, a girl with superpowers. Though she does not believe him at first, saying the story had 'plot holes,' she realizes he is telling the truth when she, Lucas, Dustin, and Steve Harrington are attacked at the junkyard by several creatures from the Upside Down. Max and Billy have a contentious relationship, and clash frequently. When he suspects her of keeping secrets, he attacks Steve and Lucas, leading Max to sedate him and warn him to leave her and her friends alone. She then helps the others set the tentacles of the Mind Flayer alight in the tunnels under Hawkins, and distracts a pack of Demodogs to buy Eleven time to seal the rift to the Upside Down. Max attends the Snow Ball at Hawkins Middle School and agrees to dance with Lucas, where they share their first kiss.

=== Season 3 ===
By June 1985, Lucas and Max are in a relationship, and she has also developed a close friendship with Eleven. She has Eleven spy on Billy with her powers, and the two become concerned that he is involved in something sinister. Will later tells the group that he believes the Mind Flayer is still in their world, and Max concludes that it has possessed her step-brother. They trap Billy in the sauna, turning up the heat and confirming their theory, though Max is traumatised by the experience. Learning from Nancy and Jonathan that several other Hawkins residents have become "flayed", Max deduces that their behaviors differs from how Will acted when he was the Mind Flayer's host. The group continue investigating and confront several monsters from the Upside Down, eventually leading to a battle with the Mind Flayer at the Starcourt Mall. When Eleven is injured, Max helps dress her wound and everyone attempts to escape but are blocked from doing so by Billy, who begins pursuing them. Max attempts to break Billy out of the Mind Flayer's control, but she is knocked unconscious and wakes up to see Billy sacrificing himself to protect Eleven and ensure the Mind Flayer's demise. Before succumbing to his wounds, Billy apologizes to Max for how he treated her and she is devastated by his death.

=== Season 4 ===
By March 1986, Max's life is in complete disarray. Following Billy's death, his father divorced Max's mother and left Hawkins, causing Max and her mother, who has started to smoke and drink heavily, to move to a trailer park. Max begins seeing the school counselor and has withdrawn from her friends, breaking up with Lucas and resisting any attempts he made to reach out. Max sees Eddie Munson and a local cheerleader, Chrissy Cunningham enter one of the trailers, then hears a scream and sees Eddie leave alone. When Chrissy's dead body is found the next day, Max tells Dustin what she saw, but as one of Eddie's close friends, he refuses to believe her. The group learn that a being known as Vecna has been stalking and killing teenagers in Hawkins, and Max realizes that she is likely going to be his next victim when she begins having traumatic visions.

Fearing her imminent death, Max visits Billy's grave to say goodbye and is psychically tormented by Vecna, who initially appears disguised as Billy, as he prepares to sacrifice her as part of his dark ritual. Nancy and Robin discover that music may help to save Max's life, and Lucas, Dustin, and Steve play her favorite song as she begins levitating over Billy's headstone in a trance. In Vecna's mindscape, Max hears the song and is able to escape back to her body. The group explore the abandoned Creel House for clues to Vecna's whereabouts, and Max begins to recognize parts of the house from her time in her visions. Max and Lucas later deduce that Vecna chooses his victims based on their emotional scars, and Lucas apologizes to her for not supporting her more as she grieved for Billy. Max also apologizes for closing herself off, and he pledges to remain by her side moving forward.

The group discover that Vecna has been sacrificing teens in order to trigger an apocalypse by opening four gates to the Upside Down, and Max offers to act as bait to lure him to the Creel House so they can destroy him. She makes herself emotionally vulnerable, admitting that there were times she had wished Billy would die, and that she immediately felt guilt and shame when he was killed by the Mind Flayer, with these feelings also making her wish that she would die too. Vecna then attacks her in her mind disguised as Lucas, and begins stalking her through her memories while the real Lucas defends her body in the real world.

Jason Carver, Chrissy's boyfriend, intercepts their operation due to belief that they were involved in something Satanic and has a brawl with Lucas; during this, they destroy the Walkman, leaving Max defenseless. After escaping into a memory of the Snow Ball, Max hides until Vecna finds her again, and pins her to a wall. Before he can go through with the kill, Eleven, who found out about Vecna's plans from Dr. Brenner, stops him. Max and Eleven share a reunion, but Vecna subdues them both and traps them in his mindscape. Max, now cornered and left with zero defenses against him, suffers as Vecna goes through with the ritual, snapping her limbs and nearly gouging out her eyes.

Eleven manages to stop Vecna from killing Max, whose body drops back down in the real world. She is left blinded and loses her physical sensations, and spends her final moments crying with Lucas, pleading that she does not want to die before dying in his arms. Not long after, her deathgate opens, causing all the gates from the other victims to merge in the middle of Hawkins, causing a massive earthquake. Refusing to accept her friend's death, Eleven uses her powers to revive Max, who is now comatose.

=== Season 5 ===
Max is taken to Hawkins Memorial Hospital, where she remains in a coma until November 1987. Her friends visit often, with Lucas spending a large amount of time by her bedside playing her song in the hope that she will awaken. Max realizes that her consciousness has been trapped in Vecna's mindscape, and she fruitlessly searches through his memories for a way to escape, eventually accepting her fate and finding a cave that he is unable to enter. After some time, Vecna kidnaps Holly Wheeler and takes her to the version of the Creel House within his mind. Max hides a map and a compass in the mailbox for Holly so that she can find her, and seeking refuge in her cave, Max reveals to Holly that they are both trapped in a mental prison with no way out. Vecna begins abducting more children, and Holly informs Max that he is planning to enact his true plan, to use the children to merge two worlds together, by the end of the day.

Knowing their time is limited, they continue searching memories and are almost able to escape until Vecna arrives and begins trying to strangle Max. Will uses his connection to the Demogorgon hive mind to look into Vecna's mind and sees that Max is still alive, and overpowers Vecna long enough that she can retreat to the cave. Will relays to Lucas and Robin that Max will return to her body if she can escape, but that Vecna has used their connection to discover where her body is in the real world. Knowing he will try to kill her, Lucas and Robin rush to the hospital, and with Robin's girlfriend Vickie, manage to evade Demodog attacks as Lucas carries Max's body, refusing to stop playing her song until she comes back to him. The group are saved by Karen Wheeler.

Max and Holly uncover a secret memory of Vecna's, and are able to successfully escape from his mindscape. She wakes up in the hospital and emotionally reunites with Lucas, telling him that he was the emotional anchor that allowed her to find her way back. Weakened from spending so long in a coma, Max uses a wheelchair, but reunites with the rest of her friends, providing them with the information she learned about Vecna while in his mind. Steve proposes a plan to finally end Vecna once and for all, and Max offers to act as Eleven's guide through his mind. They are able to locate the children, but are pulled out of Vecna's mind before they can ensure their safety.

In the real world, Max and Vickie are apprehended by Dr. Kay, and she is present when Eleven seemingly sacrifices herself during the destruction of the Upside Down. Eighteen months later in the spring of 1989, Max graduates from Hawkins High alongside Will, Mike, Lucas, and Dustin. She joins the party for a final Dungeons & Dragons campaign, where Mike narrates their futures, revealing that Max and Lucas rekindle their relationship. Mike theorizes that Eleven has survived, and Max asks whether his theory is true. Mike replies that he doesn't know, but that he chooses to believe it, and the others pledge the same. Max and the others emotionally put down their adventuring books and leave the basement.

== Development ==
The character was first revealed on September 1, 2016 in a casting call obtained by The Hollywood Reporter, which described her as a "tough and confident 13-year-old female".

=== Casting ===
Sink auditioned to play Max in September 2016 ahead of the show's second season. Sink, then fourteen, stated that the casting directors initially told her she was too old for the role, but that she "begged and pleaded" for more material to perform for them, which they eventually agreed to. She ultimately attended four call-backs for the role, including a chemistry read with Gaten Matarazzo and Caleb McLaughlin, and noted that she lied about having rollerblading experience during the process to help her secure the role. She later had to learn how to skateboard, attended three hour lessons every day for two months in preparation. Of casting Sink, show creator Matt Duffer explained that it was a "no-brainer", due to her "innocent, child chemistry" with Matarazzo and McLaughlin. Sink's official casting, alongside that of Dacre Montgomery as her brother Billy, was announced on October 16, 2016.

== In other media ==
Max is the protagonist of the young adult novel Stranger Things: Runaway Max, which was written by Brenna Yovanoff and published by Penguin Random House on June 4, 2019. The novel alternates between Max's perspective of the events of season two, and flashbacks to her life before moving to Hawkins.

In the 2026 animated spin-off series Stranger Things: Tales from '85, Max is voiced by Jolie Hoang-Rappaport.

== Reception ==
=== Awards and nominations ===
Sink's performance as Max has received critical acclaim. Alongside the rest of the cast, she was nominated for two Screen Actors Guild Awards for Outstanding Performance by an Ensemble in a Drama Series for the show's second and third seasons. She, Finn Wolfhard, Gaten Matarazzo, Caleb McLaughlin, and Noah Schnapp were also nominated for the MTV Movie & TV Award for Best On-Screen Team in 2018. For her performance in the show's fourth season, Sink was nominated for the Saturn Award for Best Performance by a Younger Actor in a Television Series, MTV Movie & TV Award for Best Performance in a Show, and the Kids' Choice Award for Favorite Female TV Star. She also won the Best Supporting Actress in a Streaming Series, Drama award at the Hollywood Critics Association TV Awards.
