= Nancy Wheeler =

Stranger Things character

- Stranger Things character
- Natalia Dyer as Nancy Wheeler in the fifth season
- First appearance: "Chapter One: The Vanishing of Will Byers" (2016)
- Created by: The Duffer Brothers
- Portrayed by: Natalia Dyer
- Voiced by: Abby Trott (Stranger Things VR); Alessandra Antonelli (Tales from '85); Madison Lee (Dead by Daylight)

In-universe information
- Full name: Nancy Wheeler
- Nicknames: Nance; Nancy Drew (by Bruce Lowe)
- Occupation: Intern at Hawkins Post (formerly)
- Family: Karen Wheeler (mother); Ted Wheeler (father); Mike Wheeler (brother); Holly Wheeler (sister)
- Significant others: Steve Harrington (ex-boyfriend); Jonathan Byers (ex-boyfriend)
- Home: Hawkins, Indiana, United States (seasons 1–5); Boston, Massachusetts, United States (season 5 epilogue)
- Nationality: American

Nancy Wheeler is a fictional character from the Netflix science fiction horror television series Stranger Things, portrayed by Natalia Dyer. She is the sister of Mike Wheeler and the girlfriend of Steve Harrington before dating Jonathan Byers. Nancy starts investigating the disappearance of Jonathan's brother Will when her friend Barbara Holland also goes missing. She teams up with Jonathan to investigate Will and Barbara's disappearance, which leads to her discovery of the Upside Down, an alternate dimension.

== Portrayal ==
In an interview for Cosmopolitan, Natalia Dyer revealed that she auditioned for the role twice and first thought she "bombed" the initial audition.

Nancy's attire for most of the fifth season was inspired by the fictional character John Rambo, and her wolf cut hairstyle was inspired by another character, Ellen Ripley.

Natalia Dyer had said in an interview she had some influence over the character's epilogue. "The Duffers, they’d go around a little bit and be like, ‘Well, what do you think?’ [...] ‘Where do you see your character?"

Nancy was named after and inspired by Nancy Thompson, a character from Wes Craven's 1984 slasher film A Nightmare on Elm Street.

== Fictional character biography ==
=== Season 1 ===
Nancy is Mike's older sister. Though Dustin Henderson indicates she was once close with Mike and his friends, she has grown distant since she began seeing Steve Harrington. Nancy's best friend, Barb, disapproves of her relationship with Steve, believing that Nancy is changing herself to fit in with him and his friends.

Unconcerned with Will Byers' disappearance due to believing he must simply be lost, Nancy disobeys her curfew and convinces Barb to join her at a party at Steve's house. As the party winds down, Nancy goes up to Steve's room and has sex with him, leaving Barb by the pool where she disappears. When Barb is not at school the next day, Nancy is immediately concerned and increasingly worries that something has happened to her. She approaches Jonathan Byers and the two begin investigating the disappearances.

While out in the woods searching for clues, Nancy accidentally enters the alternate dimension known as the Upside Down, from which she escapes with Jonathan's help. Shaken by the experience, Nancy asks Jonathan to stay the night in her room. Steve, planning to surprise Nancy, witnesses the two of them in Nancy's room together and mistakenly believes that Nancy is cheating on him. While buying materials the next day to take down the monster Nancy witnessed in the Upside Down and in photographs that Jonathan took, Steve and his friends spray graffiti calling Nancy a "slut" on the local movie theater. Seeing this, Nancy confronts Steve, which leads to a physical fight between Jonathan and Steve.

Jonathan is arrested, at which point Chief Hopper and Joyce confront him and Nancy at the police station. After explaining their theory about the monster to the adults, Nancy helps Hopper get in touch with Mike and his friends, and later they gather at Hawkins Middle School to build a makeshift sensory deprivation tank for Eleven to use in an effort to find Will and Barb. When Eleven reveals that Barb has died, Nancy is both horrified and determined to kill the monster. While Joyce and Hopper go into the Upside Down to retrieve Will, Nancy and Jonathan return to the Byers' home to create a distraction. They cut their hands to lure the Demogorgon to the home with their blood. While preparing for the monster to approach, Steve arrives at the home in hopes of reconciling with Jonathan, but inadvertently witnesses the Demogorgon. Though Nancy and Jonathan seemingly convince a frightened Steve to leave, he re-enters the house when the Demogorgon comes back and helps them injure it.

Once Will is brought home, Nancy reconciles with Steve and the two resume their relationship. They gift Jonathan with a new camera for Christmas.

=== Season 2 ===
One year after season 1's events, Nancy is still dating Steve, with whom she regularly visits Barb's parents for dinner. Unaware of Barb's death, the Hollands have hired a private investigator, Murray Bauman, to look into her disappearance. Nancy, still overcome with grief over Barb's death, gets drunk at a party and begins verbally berating Steve when he tries to cut her off from drinking more. After Steve angrily leaves the party, Jonathan escorts Nancy back home. When Nancy next sees Steve at school, she is unable to tell him she loves him, essentially severing their relationship.

Nancy confides in Jonathan and the two arrange a meeting with Barb's mother in the park. At the park, Nancy and Jonathan are overcome with the suspicion they are being watched, which is confirmed when they are intercepted by agents of the Hawkins Lab. They secretly record a conversation with Dr. Sam Owens, who explains that he is trying to amend for Dr. Martin Brenner's mistakes, admitting to culpability in Barbara's death. Nancy and Jonathan visit Murray at his residence to see if the evidence is damning enough to lead to the shutdown of Hawkins Lab. Murray suggests that they water down the story to make it more believable to the public. Recognizing the obvious tension between Nancy and Jonathan, Murray suggests that they share the bedroom. Though they initially resist, Nancy and Jonathan end up sleeping together that night.

Upon their return to Hawkins, Nancy and Jonathan find the Byers residence empty and littered with Will's drawings. They go to Hawkins Lab and come across Steve, who has befriended Dustin, Lucas Sinclair, and newcomer Max Mayfield. Together, they find Hopper, Joyce, Mike, and a heavily sedated Will, the latter of whom has become possessed by the Mind Flayer. The group returns to the Byers' house and attempt to interrogate Will, who communicates with the group via Morse code. When Eleven reunites with the group, they create a plan to take down the Mind Flayer. While Hopper and Eleven go to close the gate at Hawkins Lab, Nancy accompanies Joyce and Jonathan to Hopper's cabin to restrain Will and expose him to extreme heat in order to flush the Mind Flayer out of his body.

With Hawkins Lab exposed and shut down, Nancy attends the official funeral for those whose deaths have been obscured by the lab, including Bob Newby and Barb. Nancy and Jonathan volunteer at the Hawkins Middle School Snow Ball, where Nancy offers to dance with Dustin and consoles him after he is rejected by another girl.

=== Season 3 ===
In the summer of 1985, Nancy and Jonathan get internships at The Hawkins Post under the watch of Tom Holloway. Nancy is eager to impress her sexist male bosses by suggesting story ideas, which usually resulted in demeaning jokes and comments, leaving Nancy humiliated. One night while working late, Nancy answers a call about rats eating Doris Driscoll's fertilizer. Posing as reporters, Nancy and Jonathan interview Mrs. Driscoll at her house, where they witness a rabid rat she has captured. Nancy pitches the story to her colleagues, but they reject the story and call Mrs. Driscoll a "nut-job." When Nancy returns to the house, she discovers that Mrs. Driscoll has been infected by the newly resurrected Mind Flayer, eating fertilizer and screaming that she "has to go back".

In the meanwhile, through possessing Billy Hargrove and Tom's daughter Heather, the Mind Flayer possesses Tom and the rest of the Hawkins Post staff, and compels them to fire Nancy and Jonathan to keep them from learning the truth. Still undeterred and despite an argument with Jonathan, Nancy continues pursuing the story, noticing that Mrs. Driscoll's symptoms are similar to those of Will when he was possessed. She discusses this information with Jonathan, Will, Mike, Eleven, Lucas and Max, at which point they decide to return to the hospital. There, Nancy and Jonathan find Mrs. Driscoll is missing and are subsequently intercepted by the possessed Tom and his co-worker Bruce. A fight breaks out, with Jonathan killing Tom while Nancy kills Bruce, before the two flayed hosts merge to form a monster. The monster is wounded by Eleven before retreating to the sewers.

The group takes refuge at Hopper's cabin, but the Mind Flayer manages to track them down and wounds Eleven. At Starcourt Mall, they re-group with Dustin, Steve, Steve's co-worker Robin Buckley, and Lucas' sister Erica. While there, Hopper, Joyce and Murray arrive and reveal that a new opening to the Upside Down has been created by a Soviet detachment located under the mall. The Mind Flayer arrives at the mall; Nancy, Jonathan, Will, Lucas, Steve, and Robin fend off the monster with fireworks, while Billy attempts to infect Eleven. Eleven is able to reach through to the real Billy, at which point he sacrifices himself to the Mind Flayer to save Eleven and the others, resulting in his death. While closing the Soviet gate, Hopper is seemingly killed, leading Joyce to take in Eleven and move her family away from Hawkins. Nancy and Jonathan share a passionate and emotional goodbye before the Byers family leaves Hawkins.

=== Season 4 ===
In the spring of 1986, Nancy is preparing for college and works for the school newspaper alongside her classmate Fred Benson, while Jonathan lives in California with Joyce, Will and Eleven. Nancy waits for an update from Jonathan about his acceptance to Emerson College, where Nancy has been accepted and plans to attend, but she is unaware that he has actually decided to attend a local community college to stay close to his family. After cheerleader Chrissy Cunningham is found brutally murdered inside the trailer of student Eddie Munson, Nancy and Fred go to the trailer park to investigate; Nancy interviews Eddie's uncle, who blames Chrissy's murder on Victor Creel, a man who was placed in a psychiatric institution after allegedly killing his family in the 1950s. Fred, meanwhile, is possessed and killed by the same demonic entity that killed Chrissy. While talking to the police about Fred, Nancy sees Dustin, Steve, Robin, and Max arrive on the scene, and realizes the Upside Down is once again involved.

Nancy and Robin pose as psychology students in order to interview Creel at the Pennhurst asylum; he maintains that his family was killed by a demon, who they believe to be Vecna. Learning that Creel himself was not possessed during his family's death, likely due to music playing on the stereo at the time, they share this information with the group when Max is possessed by Vecna, helping her to successfully escape Vecna's control by playing her favorite song on her headphones.

Max draws what she experienced under possession, and Nancy recognizes that Vecna's lair is composed of detached fragments of the Creel residence, leading the group to investigate the now-abandoned house. Inside, they encounter flickering lights which they trace to Vecna's movements in the Upside Down. The lights suddenly begin to burst, corresponding to Vecna's murder of basketball player Patrick McKinney. When Dustin notices his compass is working incorrectly, they realize that a new gate to the Upside Down must be nearby, and trace it to Lover's Lake. Steve dives into the water to investigate and is dragged into the Upside Down, leading Nancy, Robin, and Eddie to follow after him. After saving Steve from a swarm of bat-like creatures, the group surmises that Vecna has created a gate at the site of each of his murders, and find a gate inside Eddie's trailer, where Chrissy died. As Robin and Eddie escape the Upside Down, Nancy is possessed by Vecna, who, by showing glimpses of his past, reveals himself to be Henry Creel, Victor's son who killed his mother and sister using telepathic powers. She learns that he was then placed in the care of Dr. Brenner, who attempted to replicate his powers in other children (including Eleven). Before he lets Nancy go, Vecna shows Nancy a vision of the future, where Hawkins has been torn apart by the Upside Down.

Nancy relays Vecna's vision to the rest of the group, and they formulate a plan to kill Vecna that night. Max baits Vecna into possessing her again, so that he is distracted while the others attempt to kill him. Nancy returns to the Upside Down with Steve and Robin, at which point Steve admits he still has feelings for Nancy. They find Vecna inside the Creel house and set him ablaze using Molotov cocktails, while Nancy shoots him with a sawed-off shotgun, sending him through the window. Looking out the window, they find that Vecna's body has disappeared. Despite their efforts, Vecna manages to possess Max and successfully converges the four gates he has opened in Hawkins, causing mass destruction.

Two days later, the town recovers from the "earthquake," while Max is comatose, having been revived by Eleven. Everyone reunites in Hawkins; Nancy and Jonathan avoid discussing the problems in their relationship. Sensing that Vecna is still alive, Will alerts the group, who then notice pieces of the Upside Down beginning to infiltrate the town.

=== Season 5 ===
With Robin, Nancy manages a radio station, which she secretly uses to coordinate "crawls" in search of Vecna in the Upside Down. During one of the "crawls", a Demogorgon attacks the Wheeler house, severely wounding her parents and abducting her younger sister Holly. With Mike and the others, Nancy looks for a way to find Holly and free her. When she and Jonathan get trapped in a room in the Upside Down that gets filled up with a gray liquid substance, they end their relationship, finally giving Nancy the freedom to explore herself. Eighteen months later in the spring of 1989, it's revealed that she has dropped out of Emerson College to become a journalist. Nancy meets with Robin, Steve, and Jonathan on the roof of WSQK, and the group promises to stay connected despite their differing life and career paths.

== In popular culture ==
Nancy, along with Steve Harrington and the Demogorgon, appeared as a playable character in the horror multiplayer video game Dead by Daylight from 2019 until 2021. They were removed from the game after the Stranger Things license was not renewed; however, they remained available to players who had already purchased them prior to the license’s expiration. Nancy and the rest of the chapter were later reintroduced to the game in November 2023.

On November 26, 2025, it was announced that another novel, titled Stranger Things: One Way or Another, written by Caitlin Schneiderhan would star Nancy and Robin Buckley investigating a new mystery in Hawkins taking place in-between the show's fourth and fifth seasons. The novel was published by Random House Worlds on December 2, 2025.

In the 2026 animated spin-off series Stranger Things: Tales from '85, Nancy is voiced by Alessandra Antonelli.

== Reception ==
Nancy's characterization has been positively received by critics, with particular praise awarded for how her character deviates from the stereotypical portrayal of teenage older sisters and young women in the horror genre. Reacting to season 1, Allie Gemmill of Bustle dubbed Nancy as a "feminist icon," noting how Nancy is able to simultaneously embrace teenage experiences like sex and drinking while also proving herself when facing the supernatural elements of the show. She has been described as the Duffer Brothers' take on final girls in 1980s horror franchises, with her character most frequently compared to Nancy Thompson from A Nightmare on Elm Street, who serves as the namesake for her character.

Nancy's season 3 storyline, which deals with workplace sexism, received mixed reactions from critics. While it was noted that the portrayal of gender-based discrimination and workplace sexual harassment was especially relevant in the MeToo climate, many critics found it unsatisfying to continually watch Nancy be put down and defeated, and found that the subplot lacked resolution.
