= Francesca Reale =

American actress

- Born: Francesca Luisa Reale; 1993 or 1994 (age 32–33); Los Angeles, California, U.S.
- Education: New York University
- Occupation: Actress
- Years active: 2015–present

Francesca Reale (born 1993 or 1994) is an American actress known best for her roles on the Netflix series Haters Back Off and Stranger Things.

== Early life ==
Reale was born and grew up in Los Angeles and graduated from New York University. She also studied at the Lee Strasberg Theatre and Film Institute and Stonestreet Studios. She received a 2012 National Youth Arts Award for Outstanding Youth Choreography for "Bordan vi Haller" in Winter Dance Concert, Hamilton Academy of Music.

== Career ==
Reale appeared for two seasons in 2016 and 2017 in the Netflix original series Haters Back Off, in which she played the supporting role of Emily, Miranda’s sister. In 2016 she also played Gabriella Moretti in the episode "Down the Rabbit Hole" on the television series Blue Bloods.

She played the recurring role of Heather, a lifeguard, on season 3 of Stranger Things, a Netflix original series. She plays Laura in the 2019 comedy film Yes, God, Yes.

== Filmography ==
=== Film ===
Year	Title	Role	Notes
2019	Yes, God, Yes	Laura	
2021	Dating and New York	Wendy Brinkley	Also executive producer
2022	Do Revenge	Ariana	
2022	Strange World	Azimuth (voice)	
2023	Parachute	Casey	
2024	Música	Haley	
2026	Do Not Enter	Cora	
TBA	Love on the Hill	Nina	Post-production

=== Television ===
Year	Title	Role	Notes
2016	Blue Bloods	Gabriella Morretti	Episode: "Down the Rabbit Hole"
2016–2017	Haters Back Off	Emily	16 episodes
2019	Stranger Things	Heather Holloway	6 episodes
2020	Wireless	Dana Harris	10 episodes
2022	Entergalactic	Sydnie (voice)	Television special
2024	Laid	Beth	2 episodes
TBA	This Summer Will Be Different	Bridget Clark	10 episodes

=== Video games ===
Year	Title	Role	Notes
2022	Horizon Forbidden West	Nel (voice)	
