= Gabriella Pizzolo =

American actress and singer (born 2003)

- Born: Gabriella Grace Pizzolo; March 10, 2003 (age 23); Schenectady, New York, U.S.
- Other name: Gabby Pizzolo
- Education: State University of New York, Purchase (BA)
- Occupations: Actor; singer
- Years active: 2013–present

Gabriella Grace Pizzolo (born March 10, 2003) is an American performer and singer. She (Note: Pizzolo is non-binary and uses she/her and they/them pronouns. This article uses she/her for consistency.) first made her breakthrough on Broadway for her performance as Matilda in Matilda the Musical (2013) and Small Alison in Fun Home (2015). In 2019, she received widespread recognition for her role as Suzie Bingham in Stranger Things.

== Career ==
Pizzolo appeared in several regional productions before making her Broadway debut as the title character in Matilda the Musical. She had auditioned for the original cast of Matilda and received several callbacks but was not cast. She auditioned again and was successful, giving her first performance of the role on December 22, 2013. She made several public appearances as Matilda, such as Broadway at Bryant Park and a Ralph Lauren Fashion Show. Her final performance in the role was on September 13, 2014. In March 2015, Pizzolo was cast as the understudy for the roles of Small Alison, Christian and John in the musical Fun Home. After the departure of Sydney Lucas in October 2015, Pizzolo assumed the role of Small Alison. During her tenure in the role, she performed "Ring of Keys" at several events, including the 20th SAGE Awards and the White House. Pizzolo played the role until the production closed on September 10, 2016.

In October 2016, Pizzolo performed in the concert version of Sunday in the Park with George at New York City Center. From January 2017, she played Opal in the musical Because of Winn Dixie at the Alabama Shakespeare Festival. Pizzolo voices Cricket in the 2018 series Butterbean's Café. She plays Suzie Bingham in season 3 of Stranger Things (2019), reprising her role again in the fourth season (2022).

== Personal life ==
Pizzolo lives in upstate New York with her parents and younger sister. Her mother, Natalie, is a teacher who homeschooled her when she was in Matilda. Pizzolo is pansexual and non-binary and uses she/her and they/them pronouns. Pizzolo attended State University of New York at Purchase located in Purchase, New York and obtained a degree in psychology in 2025.

== Filmography ==
=== Television ===
Year	Title	Role	Notes
2016	BrainDead	Young Laurel Healy	Episode: "The End of All We Hold Dear: What Happens When Democracies Fail: A Brief Synopsis"
2017	Beaches	Young CC Bloom	Television film
2018–2020	Butterbean's Café	Cricket (voice)	Main role
2019–2022	Stranger Things	Suzie Bingham	Recurring role (season 3–4)
2022	Pretty Little Liars	Angela Waters	Recurring role (season 1)

=== Film ===
Year	Title	Role	Notes
2023	The Hallow	Main Role	Short film

== Theatre ==
Year	Title	Role	Notes
2013–14	Matilda the Musical	Matilda Wormwood	Shubert Theatre; 22 December 2013 – 13 September 2014
2015–16	Fun Home	Swing	Circle in the Square Theatre; 27 March 2015 – 10 September 2016
2015–16	Fun Home	Small Alison	Circle in the Square Theatre; 27 March 2015 – 10 September 2016
2016	Sunday in the Park with George	Louise	New York City Center 24 October 2016 - 26 October 2016
2017	Because of Winn Dixie	Opal	Alabama Shakespeare Festival 27 January 2017 - 12 February 2017
