= Peggy Miley =

American actress and writer (born 1941)

- Born: 1941 (age 84–85); New York City, New York, U.S.
- Occupation: Actress
- Years active: 1984–present

Peggy Miley is an American actress and writer. She has played supporting roles in films such as Alice, The Little Princess, Bandits, The Back-up Plan, and Primary Colors. She played Doris Driscoll in the Netflix series Stranger Things. She is also known for her work in commercials, including a Christmas television ad for Cheerios in which she played the grandmother.

== Personal life ==
Miley graduated from St. Jean Baptiste High School in 1959 where she was involved with theatre, and from St. John's University with a degree in literature in 1963. In 1975 she completed a master's degree in Humanities at NYU.

== Television ==
Miley has guest starred on several television series including Becker, Boy Meets World, Liv and Maddie, NYPD Blue, Big Love, Monk, Mike & Molly and Six Feet Under. She played a supporting role in the 1998 television movie Winchell.

== Filmography ==
=== Film ===
Year	Title	Role	Notes
1986	Frog Goes to Dinner	Pauline	Video short
1988	The Beat	Mrs. Peggy Kahn	
1990	Alice	Delores	
1993	Twenty Bucks	Aunt Zoha	
1995	A Little Princess	Ms. Mabel	
1996	Pie in the Sky	Ruby's Mom Abagail	
1998	The Odd Couple II	Millie	
1998	Star Trek: Insurrection	Regent Cuzar	
2001	Bandits	Mildred Kronenberg	
2002	Surprise	Martha	Short
2007	An Irish Vampire in Hollywood	Aunt Mary	Video
2008	San Saba	Paula	
2010	The Back-up Plan	Shirley	
2011	The Resident	Mrs. Carla Rosenbaum	
2014	Life After Beth	Mrs. Bettina Howard	
2014	Just Before I Go	Mrs. Sonya Phillips	
2014	Carpool Lane Magician	Peg "	Short
2017	Altitude	Mrs. Walsh	
2017	Suburbicon	Betty	

=== Television ===
Year	Title	Role	Notes
1993	South of Sunset	Mattie	"Dream Girl"
1994	Burke's Law	Ms. Angela	"Who Killed Good Time Charlie?"
1994	California Dreams	Mrs. Rose Stimpson	"Follow Your Dreams"
1994	Murphy Brown	Rosie	"Be Careful What You Wish For"
1995	OP Center	Maureen	TV miniseries
1996	The Secret World of Alex Mack	Mrs. Rose Hardwick	"Working"
1997	The Pretender	Rosie	"Mirage"
1997	Unhappily Ever After	Mrs. Abigail Dempsey	"Shampoo"
1997	NYPD Blue	Mrs. Margaret Holden	"Tom and Geri"
1998	Frasier	Bernice Brisco	"Bad Dog"
1998	The Naked Truth	Shirley	"Jake or Fake?"
1998	3rd Rock from the Sun	Rosa, The Columbian	"Collect Call for Dick"
1998	Winchell	Olivia	TV film
1998	Becker	Mrs. Maggie Forrester	"Man Plans, God Laughs"
1999	ER	Mary, Bird Lady	"Sticks and Stones"
2000	Boy Meets World	Nana Marie aka Nana Boo Boo	"She's Having My Baby Back Ribs"
2000	Freaks and Geeks	Sylvia the Lunch Lady	"Chokin' and Tokin'"
2000	The Others	Ms. Rose Jean	"Mora"
2000	The Norm Show	Marva	"Norm vs. Halloween"
2000	That's Life	Marnie	"Bad Hair Week"
2001	Sabrina, the Teenage Witch	Mrs. Corrine Smiley	"Sabrina, the Activist"
2001	The Practice	Martha McKee	"Liar's Poker"
2003	NYPD Blue	Gretchen Wingley	"Maybe Baby"
2003	Six Feet Under	Rose Jean	"Death Works Overtime"
2004	The Shield	Lou-Ann Klopp	"Mum"
2005	Monk	Mrs. Sylvia Willis	"Mr. Monk Gets Drunk"
2008	Little Britain USA	Anna 'Fat Fighters'	Guest role
2008	Bones	Charlotte Utley	"The Passenger in the Oven"
2010	Big Love	Mrs. June Walker	"Under One Roof", "Next Ticket Out"
2010	Zeke and Luther	Irma	"Double Crush", "Seoul Bros"
2011	Big Time Rush	Bonnie Bitters	"Big Time Moms"
2012	40	Aunt Dot	TV series
2012–13	Next Caller	Sister Marcie	Unaired TV series
2013	The Mindy Project	Steve's Mom Beverly	"Danny's Friend"
2013	Crash & Bernstein	Rosie	"Parade Crasher"
2013	Modern Family	Hattie	"Goodnight Gracie"
2013	Lab Rats	Mother Perry	"My Little Brother"
2015	Mike & Molly	Joan	"Molly's Neverending Story"
2015	Liv and Maddie	Sylvia	"Gift-A-Rooney"
2016	Assistant Living Show	Carney	TV film
2017	Raven's Home	Ma Jablonski	"The Baxter's Get Bounced"
2019	Stranger Things	Doris Driscoll	TV series
2020	Curb Your Enthusiasm	Mocha Jane	"The Surprise Party"
2020	Shameless	Rhoda Tipping	"Go Home, Gentrifier!"
