= Dustin Henderson =

Stranger Things character

- Stranger Things character
- Gaten Matarazzo as Dustin Henderson in the fourth season
- First appearance: "Chapter One: The Vanishing of Will Byers" (2016)
- Created by: The Duffer Brothers
- Portrayed by: Gaten Matarazzo
- Voiced by: Braxton Quinney (Tales from '85)

In-universe information
- Full name: Dustin Henderson
- Nicknames: Toothless; Dusty; Dusty-Bun; The Bard; Inspector Gadget; Bilbo Baggins
- Occupation: Student
- Family: Claudia Henderson (mother); Walter Henderson (father)
- Home: Hawkins, Indiana, United States
- Nationality: American
- Born: May 29, 1971
- Age: 17 (as of season 5 epilogue)

Dustin Henderson (born May 29, 1971) is a fictional character from the Netflix science fiction horror television series Stranger Things, portrayed by Gaten Matarazzo. He is one of the central characters in the series, introduced in season one alongside Mike Wheeler, Will Byers, and Lucas Sinclair.

== Casting and concept ==
Gaten Matarazzo originally auditioned for the role of Mike, along with Noah Schnapp, but he was ultimately offered the role of Dustin.

The Duffer Brothers conceived Dustin Henderson as the "heart" and intellectual, yet vulnerable, anchor of the Stranger Things ensemble, designed to break 1980s tropes by elevating the "nerdy sidekick" to a leader. He was designed as a blend of classic 80s movie characters, specifically combining the "chubby kid" archetype (like Chunk from The Goonies) with the smart-mouthed, witty, and essential, yet often overlooked, teammate (like Mouth).

== Fictional character biography ==
=== Season 1 ===
Dustin is the best friend of Mike, Will and Lucas. He is a smart and quick-witted boy with cleidocranial dysplasia, incorporated from his actor who actually has this disability. In the Dungeons & Dragons party, Dustin is the Bard and has an extensive knowledge of the game, particularly the monsters. Dustin is also shown to possess a keen grasp of physics, often being the one to explain the science behind the paranormal happenings at Hawkins to his friends. In season one, after Will goes missing, Dustin joins his friends Mike, Lucas, and the new member, Eleven in uncovering the truth behind Will Byers's disappearance and helps Eleven locate him in the Upside Down.

Dustin is energetic and intelligent, often lightening things up for the party. He is known for his upbeat, loyal, and clever personality, often serving as the comic relief while also demonstrating emotional depth. Dustin is highly curious and intelligent, particularly in science and technology, which often helps the group solve supernatural mysteries. Despite occasional clumsiness and insecurity, he is empathetic and supportive of his friends, showing courage in dangerous situations. His humor, optimism, and distinctive lisp make him one of the most beloved characters of the series.

=== Season 2 ===
The second season in the series begins with the introduction of Max Mayfield who both Dustin and Lucas vie for attention, causing a tension between the two, but ultimately making up before Lucas and Max begin dating. He demonstrates increased maturity while retaining his characteristic humor and loyalty. His intelligence and curiosity are central to the plot. Meanwhile, Dustin secretly adopts a strange creature that he names Dart, later discovering it is a juvenile Demogorgon. After Dart escapes, Dustin teams up with Steve Harrington to stop a Demogorgon invasion through the underground tunnels connected to the Upside Down, forming a close friendship with him in the process. This relationship continues throughout the rest of the series.

=== Season 3 ===
In season three, Dustin reveals he has a long-distance girlfriend, Suzie, whom his friends initially doubt exists. While using a homemade radio tower he built (Cerebro) at Camp Know Where to contact her, Dustin accidentally intercepts a Russian transmission and teams up with Steve, Robin and Erica to decode it, ultimately helping the gang discover the secret Soviet base beneath Starcourt Mall, culminating in rescuing Erica and facing the Mind Flayer.

=== Season 4 ===
In season four, Dustin joins the Hellfire Club and forms a close bond with its leader, Eddie Munson. After a series of supernatural murders, Dustin identifies the killer as Vecna and assists in the plan to stop him. While distracting Upside Down creatures with Eddie, Dustin witnesses Eddie's death and later informs Eddie's uncle of his sacrifice, calling him a hero.

=== Season 5 ===
In season five, Dustin struggles with coming to terms over Eddie's death. He breaks up with Suzie and becomes withdrawn and confrontational before rejoining his friends after Vecna kidnaps several children. He enters the Upside Down with Steve, Nancy, and Jonathan, where he uncovers research identifying the Upside Down as a gateway to the Abyss, and helps stop Vecna's plan to merge the dimensions together. After Vecna and the Mind Flayer are defeated and Eleven is believed dead in the destruction of the Upside Down. Eighteen months later in the spring of 1989, Dustin delivers a defiant valedictorian speech at graduation honoring Eddie, and later plays a final game of Dungeons & Dragons with his friends, where Mike narrates their futures, revealing that Dustin attends to university but remains connected to his friends in Hawkins and remains close with Steve.

== In other media ==
In January 2026, Dustin and other Stranger Things characters were added as playable characters in the online horror game Dead by Daylight.

In the 2026 animated spin-off series Stranger Things: Tales from '85, Dustin is voiced by Braxton Quinney.
