= Joyce Byers =

Stranger Things character

- Stranger Things character
- Winona Ryder as Joyce Byers in the fifth season
- First appearance: "Chapter One: The Vanishing of Will Byers" (2016)
- Last appearance: "Chapter Eight: The Rightside Up" (2025)
- Created by: The Duffer Brothers
- Portrayed by: Television: Winona Ryder Birdy (young); Play: Isabella Pappas (West End) Alison Jaye (Broadway)

In-universe information
- Full name: Joyce Maldonado
- Occupation: Melvald's General Store employee; Telemarketer
- Spouse: Lonnie Byers (divorced)
- Significant others: Bob Newby (boyfriend; deceased); Jim Hopper (fiancé)
- Children: Jonathan Byers; Will Byers; Eleven (adoptive daughter)
- Home: Hawkins, Indiana, United States (seasons 1–3, 5); Lenora, California, United States (season 4)
- Nationality: American

Joyce Byers is a fictional character from the Netflix science fiction horror television series Stranger Things, played by Winona Ryder. She is portrayed as a resilient and fiercely protective mother to her son Will, who mysteriously disappears in the town of Hawkins, Indiana, in the first season. Joyce is characterized as a determined, resourceful, and deeply emotional person, willing to go to great lengths to find her son, even if it means confronting supernatural forces. Throughout the series, she is depicted as protective of her family and persistent in confronting supernatural threats.

Ryder's performance and the character itself have been well-received by critics.

== Characterization ==
Winona Ryder joined the cast of Stranger Things as Joyce Byers in June 2015. Ryder's sole condition to play the role to The Duffer Brothers was that, if a sequel to the film Beetlejuice (1988) ever materialized due to her and Tim Burton having been discussing such project since 2000, they had to let her take a break to shoot it; the Duffers agreed and ultimately Ryder was able to shoot Beetlejuice Beetlejuice (2024) with no difficulty. Joyce is fashioned after Richard Dreyfuss' character, Roy Neary, in Close Encounters of the Third Kind (1977). She is portrayed to appear insane to other characters as she searches for her missing son Will, whom everyone believes to be dead.

In December 2017, it was revealed Ryder would be reprising her role for the third season, after the successes of the first and second seasons. She also received a pay raise in that same season. Ryder continued to play Joyce until the fifth and final season.

== Fictional character biography ==
=== Season 1 ===
Joyce Byers is depicted as a kind, caring, and sometimes frazzled single mother working at a general store in downtown Hawkins, Indiana, who lives with her sons Jonathan and Will Byers. It is implied that she has a history of psychological issues. When Will goes missing in November 1983, Joyce immediately alerts Hawkins Chief of Police Jim Hopper. At first, he dismisses her concerns, suggesting Will might be with his father Lonnie. Hopper later becomes convinced Will is missing after finding his bicycle abandoned in a wooded area the children call Mirkwood. Joyce begins to sense Will's presence in the Byers' home but is unable to see him. She begins to receive mysterious phone calls, becoming convinced she can hear Will's breathing on the phone, but the calls always end with the family's home phone exploding.

She is dismissed as crazy when she begins to see faded visions of Will through the wall and thinks that he is communicating with her by blinking the lights around the house, but she remains steadfast in her faith. Despite her concerns, Joyce continues to comfort Jonathan. When Joyce tells Jonathan of her findings, he too dismisses them as products of an overactive mind. However, he begins to realize that what she sees is real when he visits the Upside Down, an alternate dimension, with Nancy Wheeler. When Will's body is found in a lake, Joyce is doubtful that even her own theories are true, but becomes certain that what they found drowned in a lake was not Will's body. Lonnie comes to visit and calm her, but tells her to give it up when he sees what she has discovered, due to his belief that Will is truly gone. Both Joyce and Jonathan blow up at him and tell him to leave, and then start working together to uncover more of the mystery.

Meanwhile, Hopper discovers that his house has been bugged, and goes to check on Joyce. They share what they have learned with each other, and find that both sides of the story match up. They then use Hopper's information about Hawkins Lab to sneak into the facility. After being apprehended and interrogated, Joyce and Hopper are permitted under Dr. Martin Brenner's orders to venture into the Upside Down with protective suits. There, Joyce discovers Will's body, and, after learning that he is still alive, takes him back to the real world. Will is brought home alive, and reunites with his friends whilst recuperating at Hawkins General Hospital.

=== Season 2 ===
In 1984, Joyce is happily dating Bob Newby, one of her high school classmates. Still traumatized from the previous year's events, Joyce is overprotective of Will, no longer letting him bike around town by himself. With Hopper, Joyce regularly takes Will to Hawkins Lab, where the lab's doctors monitor his health and state of mind. Given her past experience with the lab, Joyce does not trust its new director, Dr. Sam Owens, who has replaced Brenner following the latter's disappearance.

Joyce grows increasingly worried about Will, who begins having frequent "episodes" where he experiences realistic visions of the Upside Down. Owens tells her that Will is likely experiencing the "anniversary effect" of the previous year's traumatic events. Joyce remains unconvinced, even as Hopper, a Vietnam veteran, also suggests that Will might simply be suffering from PTSD. Hopper arrives at the house and asks if Will can remember anything from his most recent episode. After Joyce promises Will that she will not take him to Owens, Will says that he does not remember anything other than a shadowy figure he had been drawing previously, which the children call the Mind Flayer. Due to Will's inability to adequately describe the monster, Joyce asks if he can draw it. He agrees, but when Joyce and Hopper take a careful look at his pictures, they only see scribbles and lines. Joyce notes that some of the lines connect, which leads her and Hopper to figure out that the drawings form a map of interconnecting tunnels under Hawkins.

During an investigation, Hopper gets trapped in the underground tunnel complex, but Joyce, Bob, Mike Wheeler, and Will are able to navigate the tunnels and rescue him. However, Will begins convulsing in pain, so they take him to Hawkins Lab for treatment. There, creatures dubbed "Demodogs" assault the facility, and Bob offers to reactivate the on-site power in order to facilitate an evacuation. He makes it back to the group in time, but is soon devoured by a Demodog. Joyce, shocked and depressed, returns home with Jonathan, Nancy, and Will. Angered by Bob's death and desperate for an end to Will's ordeal, Joyce burns the shadow monster out of Will while Mike lures the Demodogs away from the gate so Eleven can close it.

=== Season 3 ===
In July 1985, Joyce notices the magnets on her fridge fail to magnetize. She gives Hopper advice on Eleven's relationship with Mike. Hopper asks Joyce on a date and she agrees, but then stands him up to go ask science teacher Scott Clarke about the failing magnets. He tells her about a theoretical machine that affects the magnetic field. Joyce shares her suspicions that the magnets are related to Hawkins Lab and the Upside Down with Hopper. Joyce and Hopper go to the old Hawkins Lab and are ambushed by Russian assassin Grigori. They escape and head to the mayor where Hopper learns that the former is doing shady real-estate deals with the Russians. Joyce suspects that the machine affecting the magnets is at one of the properties.

They visit one of the real-estate properties and are attacked by Grigori again but escape and kidnap Russian scientist Alexei. Joyce tries to interrogate him but he only speaks Russian, so Joyce and Hopper decide to see conspiracy theorist Murray Bauman, who translates for them. They learn that the Russians opened the portal to the Upside Down using the machine, and Joyce and Hopper decide to call the CIA.

Joyce and Hopper attend the Hawkins fair to find their kids. While looking for them, they overhear Russians talking about kids at the mall and head there. Joyce and Hopper are reunited with the kids and are tasked with closing the Upside Down portal underground. They are once again attacked by Grigori and Hopper fights him but gets stuck in the room with the machine and portal. Joyce turns the key and destroys the machine, which appears to disintegrate everyone in the room. This leads Joyce to believe that Hopper is dead and she adopts Eleven. Joyce decides to move out of Hawkins with her family, now including Eleven.

=== Season 4 ===
By March 1986, Joyce and her kids have started a new life in Lenora, California. Joyce works from home as a telemarketer of encyclopedias. She receives a mysterious package with postage from the Soviet Union. Inside, she finds a Russian doll. She calls Murray, who suggests the doll might have been sent to her by the KGB, who want to capture her for her role in destroying the Soviets' secret operations. She realizes the doll is broken and finds a note inside it, which tells her that Hopper is still alive and provides a phone number.

Murray comes to California and helps Joyce call the phone number in the note. They soon realize Hopper is imprisoned in the Soviet Union, and that the person who sent them the note is one of his prison guards, code named "Enzo" after the Italian restaurant where Joyce and Hopper had planned to go on a date. Enzo tells them to bring $40,000 to Alaska, where his contact Yuri is going to fly them to Kamchatka. Not wanting to get Eleven's hopes up, Joyce decides not to tell her children about the possibility that Hopper is alive. Telling the kids she is going on a work trip, Joyce and Murray fly to Alaska and find Yuri. Yuri double-crosses them and Enzo. He drugs Joyce and Murray, binds them, and takes them on his plane to turn them over to the Soviets. While they are aboard the plane, Joyce convinces Murray to subdue Yuri, but he accidentally knocks Yuri out, leaving no one to fly the plane. They crash-land but manage to arrive in Kamchatka, near the gulag where Hopper is imprisoned.

Joyce and Murray come up with a scenario to enter the prison where Hopper is held. They get inside but are horrified to see Hopper and his fellow prisoners pitted against a vicious Demogorgon. After narrowly helping Hopper and Enzo escape, Joyce reunites with Hopper. Looking for a way out, Joyce, Hopper, Murray, Enzo, and Yuri find Demodogs held captive around the prison, seemingly as subjects in scientific experiments. They also see a storm of black particles, which remind them of the Mind Flayer substance that possessed Will. They escape to a nearby town, where Joyce and Hopper share their first kiss. They then find out that their children are in mortal danger and are fighting against the Upside Down once more. Recalling the Upside Down creatures' hive mind, Joyce deduces that they can help their kids by killing the Demogorgon and the Demodogs they saw, so they decide to re-enter the prison.

Back at the prison, Hopper gets attacked by Demodogs, triggering a flashback for Joyce to Bob's death at Hawkins Lab. In a cathartic moment, Joyce kills the Demodogs attacking Hopper, rescuing him. Murray uses a flamethrower to kill the rest of the Demodogs, while Hopper uses a sword to behead the adult Demogorgon. Joyce and Hopper reunite with their children in Hawkins, as the Upside Down begins to invade the town.

=== Season 5 ===
By November 1987, Hawkins has been quarantined by the military, with Joyce living in the Wheeler household along with Will and Jonathan. She assists in the group's recon missions in the Upside Down, and helps Hopper train Eleven to battle Vecna while hiding her from the military. She eventually witnesses Vecna enter the real world, and is thrown aside while attempting to defend Will from him. As Demogorgons attempt to attack her and the group, she witnesses Will use his newly-found abilities to kill them.

She accompanies the larger group into the Upside Down in an attempt to enter the Abyss, a dimension above it, to kill Vecna in his lair and rescue children he abducted. When Vecna wakes the Mind Flayer, Joyce and the group attack it from all sides as Will and Eleven battle Vecna. After Eleven impales Vecna on a spike in his lair, Joyce decapitates him with an axe, bringing his reign of terror to an end and providing her with closure. Eighteen months later in the spring of 1989, Joyce goes on her long-awaited date with Hopper, who reveals that he got a job offer in Montauk, New York and proposes to Joyce, to which she happily accepts.

=== Stranger Things: The First Shadow ===
In the prequel play set in 1959, Joyce is a senior at Hawkins High School directing a high school production of Dark of the Moon. She is in a relationship with her future husband Lonnie, who is no longer in high school. Joyce longs to leave Hawkins and pursue her dreams of working in theatre. She attends HHS with Hopper, Bob, Ted Wheeler, and Henry Creel. After numerous cast and crew members have their animals killed under mysterious circumstances, Joyce, Hopper, and Bob attempt to uncover who is behind the heinous acts. Both Bob and Hopper express attraction to Joyce. At the end of the play, Joyce has graduated high school and is working at the local malt shop.

== Reception ==
=== Awards and nominations ===
Ryder won the Fangoria Chainsaw Awards for her portrayal of Joyce Byers in the category of Best TV Supporting Actress, and was also nominated for the Gold Derby TV Awards for Drama Supporting Actress, and the Golden Globe Awards in the Best Actress – Television Series Drama category. Ryder was also nominated for the Satellite Awards in the category for Best Actress – Television Series Drama, the Saturn Awards in the category for Best Actress on a Television Series, and the Screen Actors Guild Awards in the category for Outstanding Performance by a Female Actor in a Drama Series along with Millie Bobby Brown, who portrays Eleven. She was nominated for Best Actress in a Streaming Series, Drama by Hollywood Critics Association TV Awards. Ryder, along with the rest of the cast, was nominated for Outstanding Performance by an Ensemble in a Drama Series twice, for seasons two and three.
