= Jim Hopper (Stranger Things) =

Stranger Things character

- Stranger Things character
- David Harbour as Jim Hopper in the second season
- First appearance: "Chapter One: The Vanishing of Will Byers" (2016)
- Created by: The Duffer Brothers
- Portrayed by: Television: David Harbour; Play: Oscar Lloyd (West End) Burke Swanson (Broadway)
- Voiced by: Brent Mukai (Smite); Brett Gipson (Tales from '85)

In-universe information
- Full name: James Hopper Jr.
- Alias: Antique Chariot
- Nicknames: Jim; Hop; Chief-O; Fat Rambo; Magnum
- Occupation: Police chief
- Spouse: Diane Hopper (divorced)
- Significant other: Joyce Byers (fiancée)
- Children: Sara Hopper (daughter; deceased); Eleven (adoptive daughter); Jonathan Byers (step-son); Will Byers (step-son)
- Home: Hawkins, Indiana, United States
- Nationality: American

James Hopper Jr. is a fictional character from the Netflix science fiction horror television series Stranger Things, portrayed by David Harbour. He is a Vietnam veteran and the alcoholic chief of police in the small town of Hawkins, Indiana, who, throughout the first three seasons, investigates the strange occurrences in the town. Initially fairly reclusive and lonely due to the death of his daughter, Hopper gradually grows out of his shell, becoming the adoptive father of Eleven, and later starting a relationship with Joyce Byers.

Harbour's performance and the character itself have been well-received by critics. However, his character development in the third season was negatively received, due to being seen as regressive, hypermasculine, and misogynistic.

== Fictional character biography ==
James "Jim" Hopper Jr., nicknamed "Hop", is the chief of Hawkins Police Department. Hopper has lived in Hawkins nearly all his life, having attended high school with Joyce Byers and Bob Newby. Hopper served in the Chemical Corps during the Vietnam War, where he worked with Agent Orange, an experience he believes to have led to his daughter Sara's fatal illness. Hopper was married to Diane and they had a daughter together, Sara. They divorced after their young daughter died of cancer, which caused him to lapse into alcohol and drug addiction to numb his grief. For a few years after Sara's death, he was a homicide detective in New York City before moving back to Hawkins. Eventually he grows to be more responsible, saving Will Byers as well as taking Eleven in as his adopted daughter. In Season 3 he tries to break up Eleven and Mike since their relationship is moving too fast for him, while Hopper himself is falling in love with Joyce.

=== Season 1 ===
In Season 1, Hopper is a chainsmoking, alcoholic cop in Hawkins, Indiana. He is approached by a former high school classmate, Joyce Byers, who tells him her son, Will, has gone missing. Joyce tells Chief Hopper about the static phone call she received and suspected was Will's breathing. Hopper is reluctant to believe her but admits that the charring of the phone from the surge of electricity is unusual. Hopper realizes as the season continues that there is a vast conspiracy hiding at Hawkins Lab and he is instrumental in the mission to find and save Will. After Eleven's apparent death, Hopper is seen leaving some food in the snowy woods, including Eggos, Eleven's favorite food.

=== Season 2 ===
In flashbacks, Eleven manages to escape from the Upside Down but is forced to remain hidden in Hopper's cabin in the woods to avoid government agents. Hopper forbids her from leaving or from letting Mike or anyone else know that she is still alive. In the present, the kids prepare for Halloween. Eleven asks to go trick-or-treating, but Hopper insists that she needs to remain hidden. Hopper investigates when pumpkins patches all over town suddenly start rotting. The relationship between Hopper and Eleven is strained by this isolation, even more so when he cuts the wires to the television set. Hopper and Joyce monitor Will's visits to Hawkins Lab when he exhibits signs that he is still being influenced by the Upside Down. Hopper has to be rescued from the underground tunnels when he tries to explore them alone. He is once more instrumental in solving the mystery of the demodogs and the pumpkin rot, and ultimately takes Eleven to the basement in Hawkins to close the gate once more. After working with Eleven to close the gate he strikes a deal to officially adopt Eleven.

=== Season 3 ===
At the beginning of Season 3, Eleven and Mike have been dating for 7 months, much to the dismay of Hopper, who is annoyed that Eleven and Mike are constantly together, spending all of their time alone kissing. When Hopper confesses to Joyce that he feels uncomfortable about the situation, she suggests that he should sit down and calmly talk to Eleven and Mike about how he feels. He tries to prepare a written "heart-to-heart" speech, but when he tries to give it, it backfires and Hopper resorts to verbally threatening Mike to stay away from Eleven or he will end their relationship.

Hopper's talks with Joyce lead him to become more bold in asking her on a dinner date. Joyce misses the date and Hopper finds out that she instead spent the evening with Scott Clarke, the school science teacher, asking about why her refrigerator magnets have lost their magnetism, leading Hopper to become jealous. Joyce begs Hopper to take her back to the abandoned Hawkins lab to see if there's any equipment running; while there, Hopper is attacked by Russian enforcer Grigori. Having seen Grigori before at the Mayor's office, Hopper confronts Mayor Kline about Grigori and learns that the developers of Starcourt Mall, whom Grigori works for, have also bought up several other properties in Hawkins. Hopper and Joyce visit several of the properties, finding one that serves as a front for a Russian lab. Before Grigori attacks them, Hopper and Joyce take Alexei—one of the scientists working there—as a hostage and elude Grigori. Hopper and Joyce take Alexei to conspiracy theorist Murray to help translate Alexei's Russian, learning there is a large Russian base under the mall where Russian scientists are trying to open the gate to the Upside Down. Alexei divulges to Murray how they can stop and destroy the gate.

Hopper and Joyce bring Murray and Alexei along as they race back to Hawkins to see if their children are safe. Murray and Alexei recognize that Hopper and Joyce have unacknowledged feelings for each other. They stop at the Independence Day fair, and while Hopper and Joyce search the grounds, Murray shows Alexei around. While Murray and Alexei are enjoying the 4th of July fair, Joyce grabs Hopper's hand. Grigori arrives and kills Alexei as other Russian agents give chase to Hopper. Hopper runs away while holding hands with Joyce. Hopper bests them, and he, Joyce, and Murray race for the mall, where they reunite with the children, and learn that the giant Mind Flayer is about to attack but can be stopped if they close the gate to the Upside Down. Hopper, Joyce, and Murray offer to descend to the base and find the keys Alexei told them about to not only close the gate but destroy the equipment, which would disintegrate anyone left in the room. While waiting in a room, Joyce asks Hopper out on a date. Hopper, Joyce and Murray successfully execute their plan, but before they can close the gate Grigori arrives and fights Hopper. Hopper gets the upper hand and throws Grigori into the equipment, killing him but leaving Hopper unable to leave the room. He gives Joyce a nod, and she tearfully deactivates the machine. The gate is closed and a huge explosion occurs, appearing to disintegrate everyone in the room, including Hopper. Joyce and Murray make it to the surface and reunite with the children, and Eleven can tell from Joyce's expression that Hopper didn't make it out alive.

Three months later, Joyce and her family, along with Eleven, are preparing to move out of Hawkins, and Joyce gives Eleven the heart-to-heart speech Hopper had written. The speech explains how Hopper was fearful of seeing Eleven grow up but admitted that it was time, asking her to be careful as she matures and grows older.

=== Season 4 ===
Hopper is revealed to have survived the explosion beneath Starcourt Mall, only to be captured by the Russians and sent to a prison camp in Kamchatka. During his captivity, Hopper bribes and, later, befriends a guard, Dmitri Antonov, through whom he sends Joyce a note indicating he is alive. Antonov instructs Joyce and Murray to pay $40,000 USD to smuggler Yuri Ismaylov in Alaska in exchange for passage to the Soviet Union. Hopper manages to briefly escape the prison camp, but Yuri is revealed to have betrayed him and Antonov to the Russians for a larger profit, resulting in his recapture.

Hopper is imprisoned alongside Antonov, and learns that they will be fed to a Demogorgon that the Russians have in captivity. Recalling that the creature's weakness is fire, Hopper pockets a lighter and some vodka from a guard, and uses it to create a flaming spear with which he holds back the Demogorgon as it slaughters most of the other prisoners. Joyce and Murray infiltrate the prison and open a door that allows Hopper and Antonov to escape. Hopper and Joyce reunite and finally admit their romantic feelings for one another. However, the group finds more creatures from the Upside Down under study inside the prison. Hopper calls one of Owens' agents and learns that Eleven and her friends are facing another threat from the Upside Down in Hawkins. Hopper, Joyce and Murray kill the other creatures in the prison to weaken the Upside Down's "hive mind" and give the kids an advantage, while Antonov convinces Yuri to fly them home. Two days later, Hopper reunites with Eleven and the others in Hawkins, but they notice the Upside Down beginning to invade the town.

=== Season 5 ===
Hopper goes on "crawls" in search of Vecna in the Upside Down. He is worried that Eleven might have the same fate as his late daughter, especially with Kali around, and the crawl almost went downhill after Vecna attacked him by entering his mind and letting his fear to get the best of him, almost leading to the capturing of Kali and Eleven. Eighteen months later in the spring of 1989, he proposes to Joyce and suggests they relocate to Montauk, New York to start a new life together, which would also allow them to be close to her children, who are living in New York.

== Reception ==
The character and Harbour's performance was positively received. In a review of the second season for RogerEbert.com, critic Brian Tallerico praised Harbour's performance, saying "David Harbour is even better this year than he was last, particularly in the final episode." Fans also praised the new look of Hopper.

Hopper's attitude and behavior in the third season attracted criticism, with many critics and fans feeling that his character had regressed into a caricature of himself when compared to the first two seasons. Vulture said of him "Normal Jim Hopper has transformed into Jerk-Ass Hopper, particularly in the early episodes of Stranger Things 3, which makes for a jarring reintroduction to his character. In addition to his overblown objection to what is, ultimately, very chaste physical contact between Mike and El, he also gets disproportionately annoyed with Joyce when she stands him up for dinner, bickers constantly with Joyce about minor problems; physically assaults the Hawkins Mayor, Larry Kline, to extract information from him; and shows little mercy toward Alexei, the Russian scientist he and Joyce kidnap so they can figure out what the Commies are really doing in town."

There is a novel depicting Hopper, titled The Darkness on the Edge of Town. Hopper was depicted in The Simpsons Halloween special ("Treehouse of Horror XXX") as Chief Wiggum. The character also has its own Funko Mystery Minis toy.

For his performance as Hopper, Harbour was nominated for Outstanding Supporting Actor in a Drama Series at the 69th and 70th Primetime Emmy Awards. At the 75th Golden Globe Awards, he was nominated for Outstanding Supporting Actor in a Series, Miniseries, or Television Film.
