= Billy Hargrove =

1. REDIRECT List of Stranger Things characters#Billy Hargrove
