= Vancouver Film Critics Circle Award for Best Screenplay for a Canadian Film =

Canadian film award

The Vancouver Film Critics Circle Award for Best Screenplay for a Canadian Film is an annual award given by the Vancouver Film Critics Circle. The Best Screenplay for a Canadian Film Award was first awarded in 2015 for films released in 2014.

== Winners ==
=== 2010s ===
Year	Winner	Film	Reference
2014	Xavier Dolan	Mommy	
2014	Andrew Huculiak, Josh Huculiak, Cayne McKenzie, Joseph Schweers	Violent	
2014	Elan Mastai	The F Word	
2015	Emma Donoghue	Room	
2015	Benjamin August	Remember	
2015	Andrew Cividino, Blain Watters, Aaron Yeger	Sleeping Giant	
2016	Ann Marie Fleming	Window Horses	
2016	Kevan Funk	Hello Destroyer	
2016	Ashley McKenzie	Werewolf	
2017	Pascal Plante	Fake Tattoos (Les faux tatouages)	
2017	Cody Bown	Gregoire	
2017	Kathleen Hepburn	Never Steady, Never Still	
2018	Keith Behrman	Giant Little Ones	
2018	Katherine Jerkovic	Roads in February (Les routes en février)	
2018	Zebulon Zang	N.O.N.	
2019	Yonah Lewis, Calvin Thomas	White Lie	
2019	Kazik Radwanski	Anne at 13,000 Ft.	
2019	Matthew Rankin	The Twentieth Century	

=== 2020s ===
Year	Winner	Film	Ref.
2020	Sean Durkin	The Nest	
2020	Brandon Cronenberg	Possessor	
2020	Titus Heckel	Chained	
2021	Michael McGowan	All My Puny Sorrows	
2021	Igor Drljaca	The White Fortress (Tabija)	
2021	Danis Goulet	Night Raiders	
2021	Catherine Hernandez	Scarborough	
2022	Chandler Levack	I Like Movies	
2022	Anthony Shim	Riceboy Sleeps	
2022	Clement Virgo	Brother	
2023	Matt Johnson, Matthew Miller	BlackBerry	
2023	Meredith Hama-Brown	Seagrass	
2023	Julia Lederer	With Love and a Major Organ	
2024	Megan Park	My Old Ass	
2024	Ann Marie Fleming	Can I Get a Witness?	
2024	Matthew Rankin	Universal Language	
2025	Daniel Roher, Robert Ramsey	Tuner	
2025	Matt Johnson, Jay McCarrol	Nirvanna the Band the Show the Movie	
2025	Chandler Levack	Mile End Kicks	
