= Vancouver Film Critics Circle Awards 2015 =

Annual Canadian film awards ceremony

The nominations for the 16th Vancouver Film Critics Circle Awards, honoring the best in filmmaking in 2015, were announced on December 14, 2015. Several winners were announced on December 21, 2015, while the rest were revealed on January 6, 2016.

== Winners and nominees ==
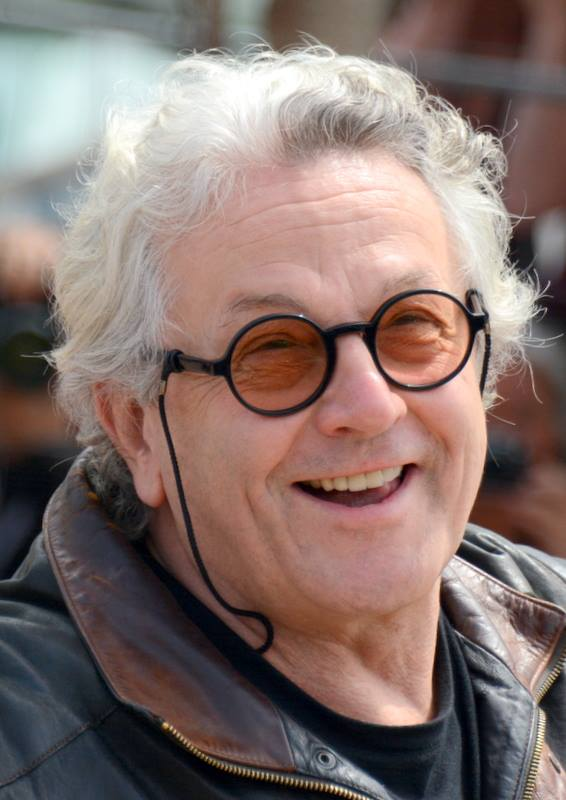
George Miller, Best Director winner

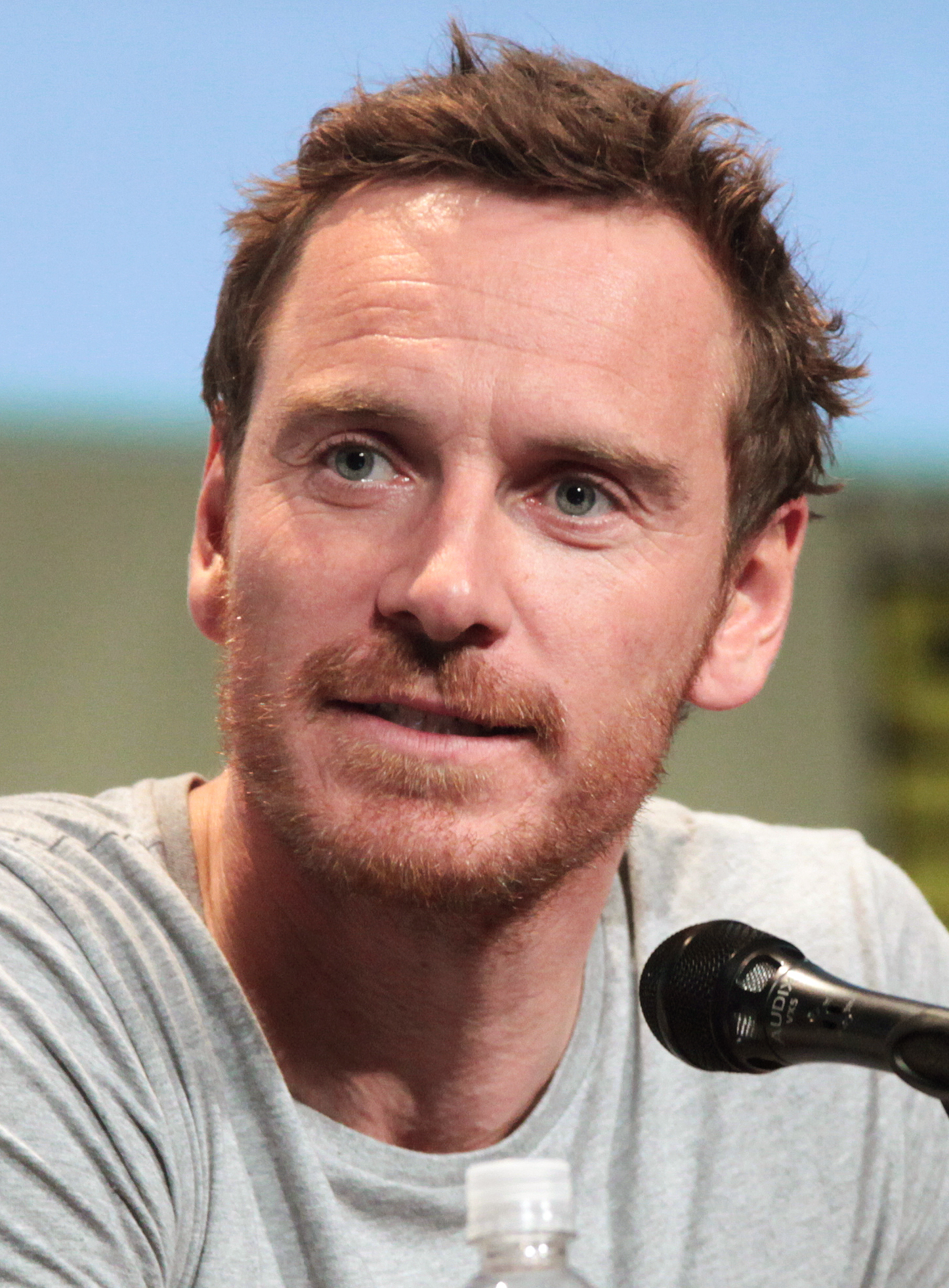
Michael Fassbender, Best Actor winner

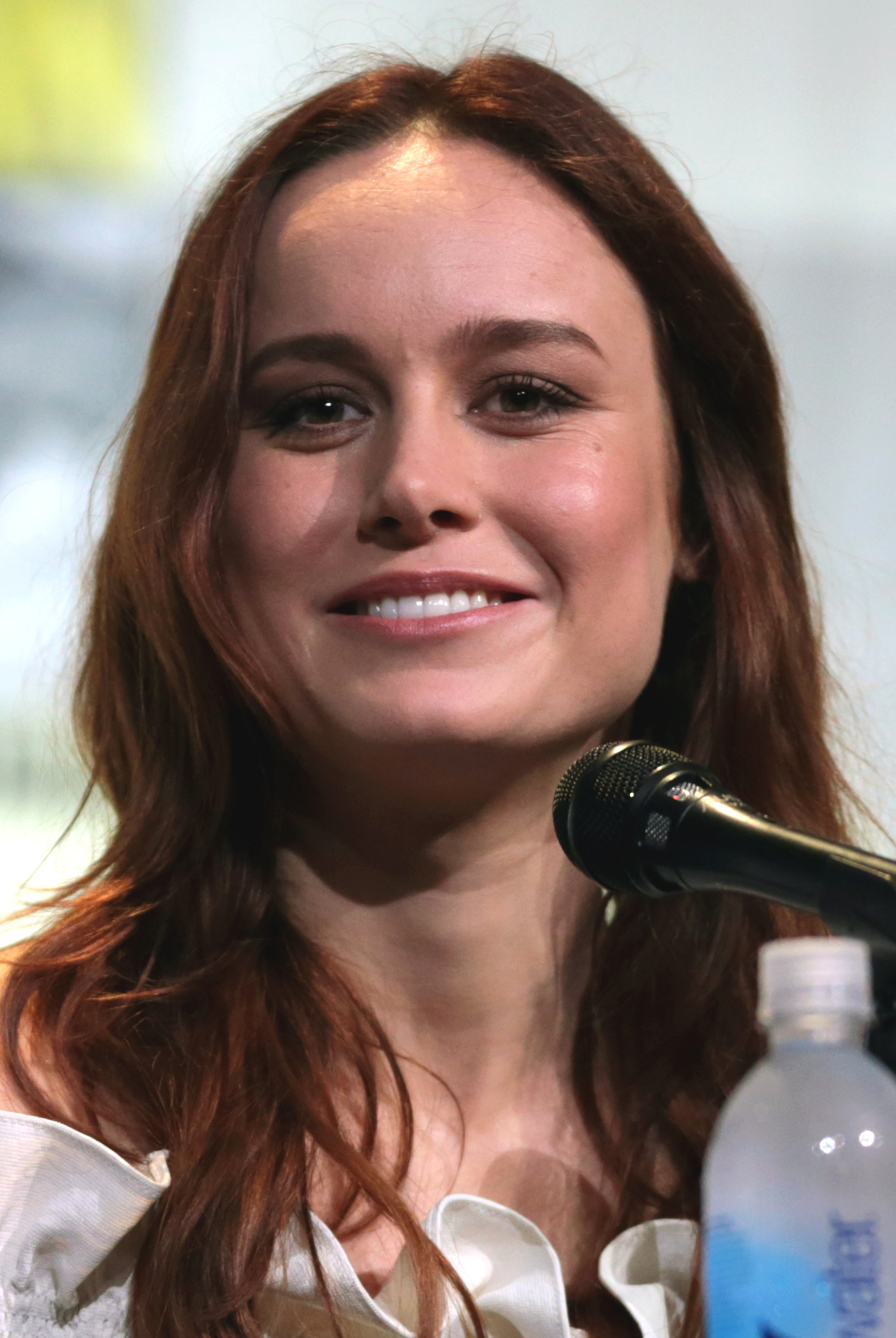
Brie Larson, Best Actress winner

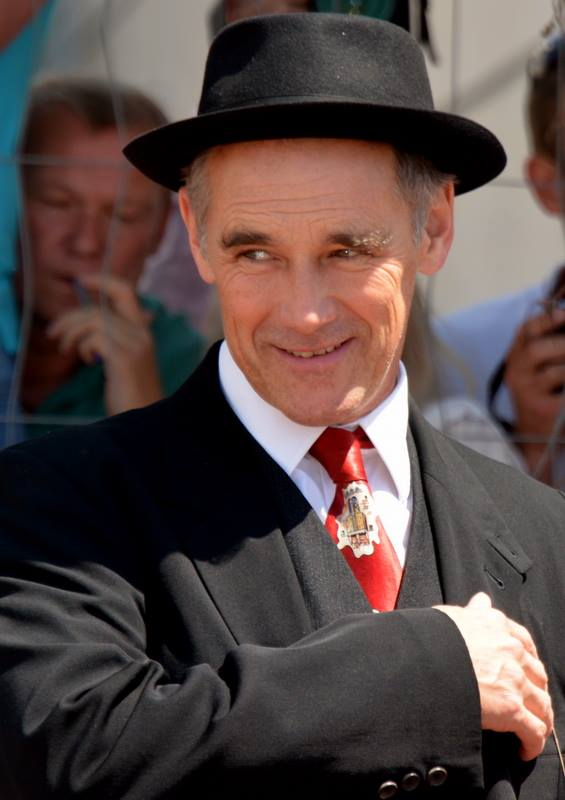
Mark Rylance, Best Supporting Actor winner

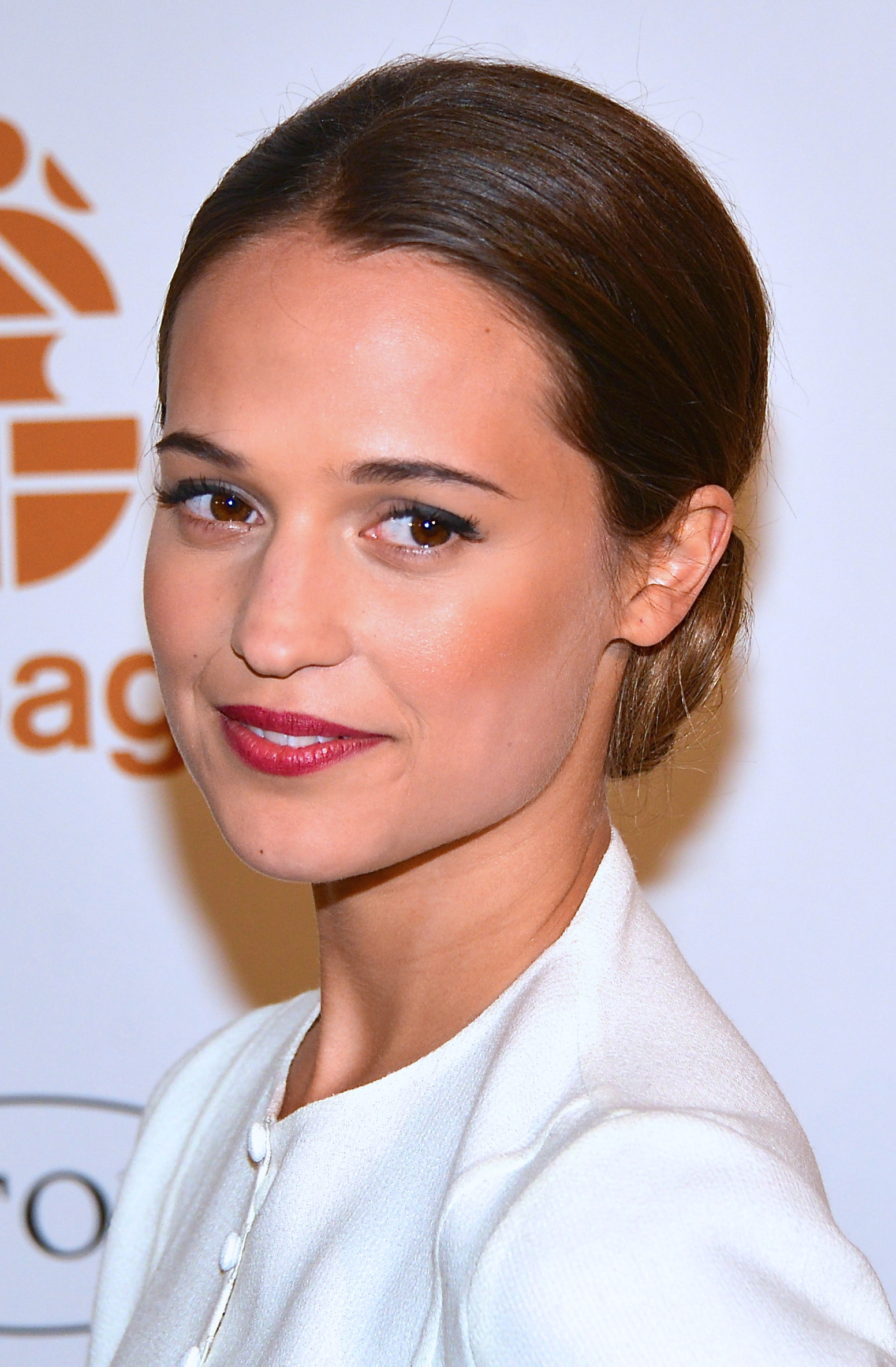
Alicia Vikander, Best Supporting Actress winner

=== International ===
Best Film

- Spotlight
- Mad Max: Fury Road
- The Revenant

Best Director

- George Miller – Mad Max: Fury Road
- Todd Haynes – Carol
- Alejandro G. Iñárritu – The Revenant

Best Actor

- Michael Fassbender – Steve Jobs
- Leonardo DiCaprio – The Revenant
- Eddie Redmayne – The Danish Girl

Best Actress

- Brie Larson – Room
- Cate Blanchett – Carol
- Saoirse Ronan – Brooklyn

Best Supporting Actor

- Mark Rylance – Bridge of Spies
- Michael Shannon – 99 Homes
- Sylvester Stallone – Creed

Best Supporting Actress

- Alicia Vikander – Ex Machina
- Jennifer Jason Leigh – The Hateful Eight
- Alicia Vikander – The Danish Girl

Best Screenplay

- Charlie Kaufman – Anomalisa
- Emma Donoghue – Room
- Tom McCarthy and Josh Singer – Spotlight

Best Foreign-Language Film

- The Assassin
- Goodnight Mommy
- Son of Saul

Best Documentary

- Amy
- Cartel Land
- Going Clear: Scientology and the Prison of Belief

=== Canadian ===
Best Canadian Film

- Room
- The Forbidden Room
- Sleeping Giant

Best Director of a Canadian Film

- Andrew Cividino – Sleeping Giant
- Lenny Abrahamson – Room
- Atom Egoyan – Remember

Best Actor in Canadian Film

- Jacob Tremblay – Room
- Michael Eklund – Eadweard
- Christopher Plummer – Remember

Best Actress in Canadian Film

- Brie Larson – Room
- Marie Brassard – The Heart of Madame Sabali
- Julia Sarah Stone – Wet Bum

Best Supporting Actor in Canadian Film

- Nick Serino – Sleeping Giant
- Patrick Huard – My Internship in Canada
- Reece Moffett – Sleeping Giant

Best Supporting Actress in Canadian Film

- Tara Pratt – No Men Beyond This Point
- Joan Allen – Room
- Suzanne Clement – My Internship in Canada

Best Screenplay of a Canadian Film

- Emma Donoghue – Room
- Benjamin August – Remember
- Andrew Cividino, Blain Watters, and Aaron Yeger – Sleeping Giant

Best Canadian Documentary

- Haida Gwaii: On the Edge of the World
- Fractured Land
- How to Change the World
- Hurt

Best First Film by a Canadian Director

- Sleeping Giant
- Hit 2 Pass
- Wet Bum

Best British Columbia Film

- Haida Gwaii: On the Edge of the World
- Eadweard
- No Men Beyond This Point
