= White Lie (film) =

- Film poster
- Directed by: Yonah Lewis; Calvin Thomas
- Written by: Yonah Lewis; Calvin Thomas
- Produced by: Karen Harnisch; Yonah Lewis; Calvin Thomas; Katie Bird Nolan; Lindsay Tapscott
- Starring: Kacey Rohl; Amber Anderson; Martin Donovan; Connor Jessup
- Cinematography: Christopher Lew
- Edited by: Lev Lewis
- Music by: Lev Lewis
- Production companies: Film Forge Productions; Lisa Pictures; Babe Nation Films
- Distributed by: levelFILM
- Release date: September 7, 2019 (TIFF)
- Running time: 96 minutes
- Country: Canada
- Language: English

White Lie is a 2019 Canadian drama film written and directed by Yonah Lewis and Calvin Thomas. The film stars Kacey Rohl as Katie Arneson, a university student who fakes a cancer diagnosis for the attention and financial gain, but gets caught up in having to maintain her lie.

It premiered at the 2019 Toronto International Film Festival, and had its international premiere at the 24th Busan International Film Festival.

== Plot ==
College student Katie Arneson has been faking a cancer diagnosis for ten months. She pops placebos, shaves her head and starves herself to appear more sickly to those watching. A minor celebrity on campus, Katie uses her fraudulent disease for both emotional and financial gain, raising money through crowdfunding campaigns, while collecting friends, supporters and an unsuspecting girlfriend, Jennifer Ellis.

Katie learns a university bursary she has been counting on is in jeopardy unless she can provide medical records of her illness by the end of the week. She enlists the help of a medical resident to forge the documents, but she struggles to produce the $2,000 he demands without raising suspicion. Desperate, Katie visits her estranged father and asks for the money, telling him that she will use it to visit a clinic for special treatment. However, her father sees through the lie; he refuses to give her the money and accuses her of lying about the cancer. It is revealed that in high school Katie also faked an illness before eventually being exposed. Her father pleads with her to come clean publicly, but she refuses, maintaining the lie.

With nowhere else to turn, Katie asks Jennifer, whose family is wealthy, and Jennifer agrees immediately to provide the money. That night, Katie searches Jennifer's phone and discovers that her father has called Jennifer, intending to reveal her lies. Katie deletes the message and blocks her father from Jennifer's phone.

Katie obtains and submits the falsified medical documents to the university; relieved, she visits Jennifer's family. However, during the visit she discovers that her father has written a tell-all post on Facebook, exposing her lies. Katie visits a friend whose mother is a lawyer. She hopes to sue her father to take the post down, but as the conversation progresses and Katie tacitly admits that she is faking the illness, she learns that if she is shown to be lying, she will face jail time for defrauding the public through her fundraising schemes.

In a frantic effort to contest the accusations, Katie descends into a spiral of misguided decisions that further entrench her deceit. With support from her community quickly fading, and determined to salvage her relationship with Jennifer, Katie overlooks an opportunity to come clean, and instead continues to betray and manipulate her devoted partner. Convinced yet again of Katie's lie, Jennifer accompanies her girlfriend to a radio program where Katie will attempt to regain the public's confidence. As they wait in the hall, Jennifer insists that she be with Katie at all her future medical and chemotherapy appointments. In response, Katie asks Jennifer to marry her, saying that if they are married "I won't lie, I won't be sick anymore." Katie is called to the studio, leaving a stunned Jennifer in the hall. Jennifer begins to cry, then stands.

== Cast ==
- Kacey Rohl as Katie Arneson
- Amber Anderson as Jennifer Ellis
- Martin Donovan as Doug Arneson
- Thomas Antony Olajide as Dr. Jabari Jordan
- Connor Jessup as Owen
- Sharon Lewis as Colette
- Christine Horne as Julia Stansfield
- Darrin Baker as Dr. Becker
- Zahra Bentham as Kadisha
- Lanette Ware as Dr. Platt
- Carolina Bartczak as Magda

== Production ==
Yonah Lewis and Calvin Thomas began developing a film about a woman faking cancer for personal gain in 2012. "For the first time, we had a story based upon a character and not the other way around. We always envisioned it as a fast-paced procedural rather than a drama," they explained in an interview with Playback. Lewis and Thomas spent several years considering possible narrative structures for the film, including the "rise and fall" of standard biopics. The first draft was written in 2015 and compressed the story into a five-day timeline. "We had to find a balance of not telling too much and telling just enough that you have enough insight into what happened over the past couple months of her life," said Thomas. Films from the Romanian New Wave, including 4 Months, 3 Weeks and 2 Days (2007), influenced the plotting.

In a 2020 interview, Lewis and Thomas said they wanted Katie to occupy a morally ambiguous space rather than be a clear-cut villain, and observed that test audiences had reacted more harshly to her as an unlikeable character than they likely would have to a male character with comparable flaws. Rather than tracing her behaviour to a single originating event, the directors said they were more interested in "seeding lots of little things" throughout the film that might hint at her motivations.

The duo worked again with producer Karen Harnisch, who had recently brought the Canadian independent film Sleeping Giant (2015) to the Cannes Film Festival, and was able to help them secure a larger budget. "It was an aspiration for all of us to create a really polished film that graduated us from the mumblecore-y microbudget world," Harnisch told The Globe and Mail.

The film was shot in Toronto and Hamilton under the working title Baldy. Principal photography began on November 14, 2018 and was completed on December 14.

== Reception ==
=== Critical response ===
On review aggregation website Rotten Tomatoes, the film holds an approval rating of 92% based on 24 reviews, and an average rating of 8.3/10. On Metacritic, which assigns a rating to reviews, the film has a weighted average score of 81 out of 100, based on 6 critics, indicating "universal acclaim".

The Globe and Mail's Carly Lewis awarded the film four out of four stars and described it as "an incredible feat of showcasing the complicated scramble that is being alive." Adding that White Lie "unfurls to become an unexpected empathy inquest." NOW Magazine's Norman Wilner called the film "a character piece that plays like a thriller."

Calum Marsh praised the film's direction in a piece for Maclean's on the best Canadian films at the 2019 Toronto International Film Festival, writing "The directors calibrate the tension perfectly, and without moralizing indict an age in which, thanks to the internet and social media, the line between public and private lives has blurred, and we are all trying our best to keep up appearances." The Hollywood Reporter's Stephen Dalton echoed the sentiment, stating, "Driven by nuanced, persuasive performances and shot with an urgent, jittery tension, White Lie is a compelling close-up character study of a recklessly needy anti-heroine caught in an impossible dilemma of her own making." Writing for the Calgary Herald, Chris Knight gave the film four out of five stars and called Rohl's performance "an engaging villain," noting that the screenplay left her precise motivations deliberately unresolved through to the final scene.

=== Awards ===
In December 2019, the film was named to TIFF's annual year-end Canada's Top Ten list.

Award	Date of ceremony	Category	Recipient(s) and nominee(s)	Result	Ref(s)
Vancouver Film Critics Circle	January 6, 2020	Best Screenplay for a Canadian Film	Yonah Lewis, Calvin Thomas	Won	
Vancouver Film Critics Circle	January 6, 2020	Best Actress in a Canadian Film	Kacey Rohl	Nominated	
Vancouver Film Critics Circle	January 6, 2020	Best Supporting Actress in a Canadian Film	Amber Anderson	Won	
Miami Film Festival	March 23, 2020	Rene Rodriguez Critics Award	Yonah Lewis, Calvin Thomas	Won	
Canadian Screen Awards	May 28, 2020	Best Motion Picture	Karen Harnisch, Yonah Lewis, Calvin Thomas, Katie Bird Nolan, Lindsay Tapscott	Nominated	
Canadian Screen Awards	May 28, 2020	Best Director	Yonah Lewis, Calvin Thomas	Nominated	
Canadian Screen Awards	May 28, 2020	Best Actress	Kacey Rohl	Nominated	
Canadian Screen Awards	May 28, 2020	Best Original Screenplay	Yonah Lewis, Calvin Thomas	Nominated	
Philadelphia Film Festival	November 3, 2020	Honorable Mention for Performance	Kacey Rohl	Won	
Toronto Film Critics Association	March 9, 2021	Rogers Best Canadian Film Award	Yonah Lewis, Calvin Thomas	Runner-up	
