= Toronto Film Critics Association Awards 2015 =

Annual Canadian film awards ceremony

19th Toronto Film Critics Association Awards
- Date: December 14, 2015

Highlights
- Best Picture: Carol

The 19th Toronto Film Critics Association Awards, honoring the best in film for 2015, were awarded on December 14, 2015.

== Winners ==
Category	Winners and nominees	Films
Best Film	Todd Haynes	Carol
Best Film	George Miller	Mad Max: Fury Road
Best Film	Tom McCarthy	Spotlight
Best Canadian Film	Guy Maddin and Evan Johnson	The Forbidden Room
Best Canadian Film	Philippe Falardeau	My Internship in Canada
Best Canadian Film	Andrew Cividino	Sleeping Giant
Best Actor	Tom Hardy	Legend
Best Actor	Leonardo DiCaprio	The Revenant
Best Actor	Michael Fassbender	Steve Jobs
Best Actress	Nina Hoss	Phoenix
Best Actress	Cate Blanchett	Carol
Best Actress	Brie Larson	Room
Best Supporting Actor	Mark Rylance	Bridge of Spies
Best Supporting Actor	Benicio Del Toro	Sicario
Best Supporting Actor	Michael Shannon	99 Homes
Best Supporting Actress	Alicia Vikander	Ex Machina
Best Supporting Actress	Rooney Mara	Carol
Best Supporting Actress	Kristen Stewart	Clouds of Sils Maria
Best Director	Todd Haynes	Carol
Best Director	Tom McCarthy	Spotlight
Best Director	George Miller	Mad Max: Fury Road
Best Director	Denis Villeneuve	Sicario
Best Screenplay	Charles Randolph and Adam McKay	The Big Short
Best Screenplay	Charlie Kaufman	Anomalisa
Best Screenplay	Phyllis Nagy	Carol
Best Screenplay	Josh Singer and Tom McCarthy	Spotlight
Best First Feature	Alex Garland	Ex Machina
Best First Feature	Andrew Cividino	Sleeping Giant
Best First Feature	László Nemes	Son of Saul
Best Animated Feature	Richard Starzak and Mark Burton	Shaun the Sheep Movie
Best Animated Feature	Charlie Kaufman and Duke Johnson	Anomalisa
Best Animated Feature	Pete Docter	Inside Out
Best Foreign-Language Film	Christian Petzold	Phoenix
Best Foreign-Language Film	Hou Hsiao-hsien	The Assassin
Best Foreign-Language Film	László Nemes	Son of Saul
Best Documentary Film	Joshua Oppenheimer	The Look of Silence
Best Documentary Film	Asif Kapadia	Amy
Best Documentary Film	Stevan Riley	Listen to Me Marlon
