= Infinity Pool (film) =

2023 film by Brandon Cronenberg

- Theatrical release poster
- Directed by: Brandon Cronenberg
- Written by: Brandon Cronenberg
- Produced by: Karen Harnisch; Andrew Cividino; Christina Piovesan; Noah Segal; Rob Cotterill; Anita Juka; Daniel Kresmery; Jonathan Halperyn
- Starring: Alexander Skarsgård; Mia Goth; Cleopatra Coleman
- Cinematography: Karim Hussain
- Edited by: James Vandewater
- Music by: Tim Hecker
- Production companies: Film Forge; Elevation Pictures; 4film; Hero Squared; Telefilm Canada; Eurimages; The Croatian Audiovisual Centre; Celluloid Dreams
- Distributed by: Elevation Pictures (Canada); Blitz (Croatia); Pannonia Entertainment (Hungary)
- Release dates: January 21, 2023 (Sundance); January 27, 2023 (Canada)
- Running time: 118 minutes
- Countries: Canada; Croatia; Hungary
- Language: English
- Box office: $5.2 million

Infinity Pool is a 2023 science fiction horror film written and directed by Brandon Cronenberg. The film stars Alexander Skarsgård, Mia Goth, and Cleopatra Coleman. Set in the fictional country of Li Tolqa, it follows struggling novelist James Foster (Skarsgård) and his wife Em (Coleman), a couple on vacation at a seaside resort who, after meeting another couple and having dinner with them, discover the country's dark culture.

Cronenberg started developing the project in 2019, with production later being pushed back to 2021. Much of the cast joined the project that year and filming took place primarily in Budapest and Šibenik.

Infinity Pool premiered at the Sundance Film Festival on January 21, 2023, and was theatrically released in Canada on January 27, 2023, to critical acclaim, with particular praise for Goth's performance.

== Plot ==
Novelist James Foster and his wife Em spend time at a resort in the fictional seaside country of Li Tolqa, where a local festival is underway. The couple's implied marital strife is exacerbated when Gabi, a fan of James' only published novel, invites them to spend time with her and her husband Alban. The four have dinner and spend the next day driving in the countryside, even though they have been warned that tourists are to remain on the resort grounds at all times.

At a beach, as James urinates behind a tree, Gabi walks up behind him, masturbates him to orgasm, and then walks away without saying a word. After a long day of sunbathing and cooking, the four drunkenly drive back to their hotel. En route, the lights of the car begin to flicker, and James accidentally hits a local man, killing him. Gabi insists that they cannot call the police as the country is corrupt and they will not be safe.

The next day, James is arrested. The penalty for his crime is death at the hand of his victim's firstborn son. However, due to diplomatic agreement, the country has a unique system of justice reserved for foreign nationals. The guilty, for a hefty fee, can be copied and have their duplicates killed in their place. These "doubles" to be executed are exact copies of the original, down to the memories of having committed the crime. James pays the fee to escape execution.

James' clone, tied to a stake, pleads with Em to save him as the victim's teenage son executes him with a large dagger. While Em is horrified and wants to leave immediately, James is titillated by the spectacle. He tells Em that his passport (which he hid) is missing and encourages her to return to the United States alone.

James extends his stay by a week and encounters Gabi and Alban again. They introduce him to a small group of Western tourists who all have been convicted of serious crimes and have paid to watch their doubles killed. One of the group asks James whether he can be certain that he is the original version of himself or the double, since he became unconscious during the process and only came round in bed later.

The group mounts a robbery in the home of the resort owner which turns into a shootout. The next day, the whole group watches their clones' group execution. Em leaves the country in disgust, finding James intolerable. Over the next several days, the group encourages James to transform into a libertine criminal, encouraging him to kill locals, engage in intoxicated orgies (he uses a local hallucinogen with Gabi, so it is unclear how much of the orgy is real), and abuse other resort guests.

One night James is tricked into brutalizing a clone of himself he had been led to believe was the detective who initially arrested him, but which the group had paid the detective to provide. In a moment of clarity and panic, James retrieves his passport and attempts to flee. However, the tourist group abducts him from the bus transporting him to the airport. Gabi reveals that she finds him pathetic, that she never read his book, and that he was targeted by the group, which is abusing him for their own amusement. The accident James and Em had with Gabi and Alban made their plan easier to implement, but if not for the accident, they would have found a way to get him in trouble. James runs off into a nearby wilderness, but Gabi shoots him in the leg.

After hours of wandering, James collapses at a farm, where a local family takes him in to recuperate. In his drugged state, he experiences another series of hallucinations involving the son of the man he struck and killed with the car strangling him. Once he has regained his strength, he is again confronted by Gabi's group, who order him to ritualistically kill a leashed duplicate of himself they refer to as "the dog" to complete his transformation into a murdering tourist. He refuses, but when the clone attempts to kill him, James beats him to death. Gabi consoles James by exposing her bare breast, covering it with the warm blood of "the dog" and inviting him to simulate breastfeeding.

The next day, as they head back to the United States, the other tourists casually chat about minutiae of their lives at home and work while James is silent and visibly traumatized, although he appeared to have reconciled with Em over the phone prior to leaving the hotel. They invite him to rejoin them next year—they return to the resort annually to commit crimes and pay to watch their doubles get slaughtered. Sitting at the gate at the airport, James intentionally misses his flight. He returns to the closed resort, where the rainy season has begun. He sits alone in the downpour of the monsoon.

== Cast ==
- Alexander Skarsgård as James Foster
- Mia Goth as Gabi Bauer
- Cleopatra Coleman as Em Foster
- Jalil Lespert as Alban Bauer
- Amanda Brugel as Jennifer
- John Ralston as Dr. Bob Modan
- Jeffrey Ricketts as Charles
- Caroline Boulton as Bex
- Thomas Kretschmann as Detective Thresh

== Production ==
=== Development ===
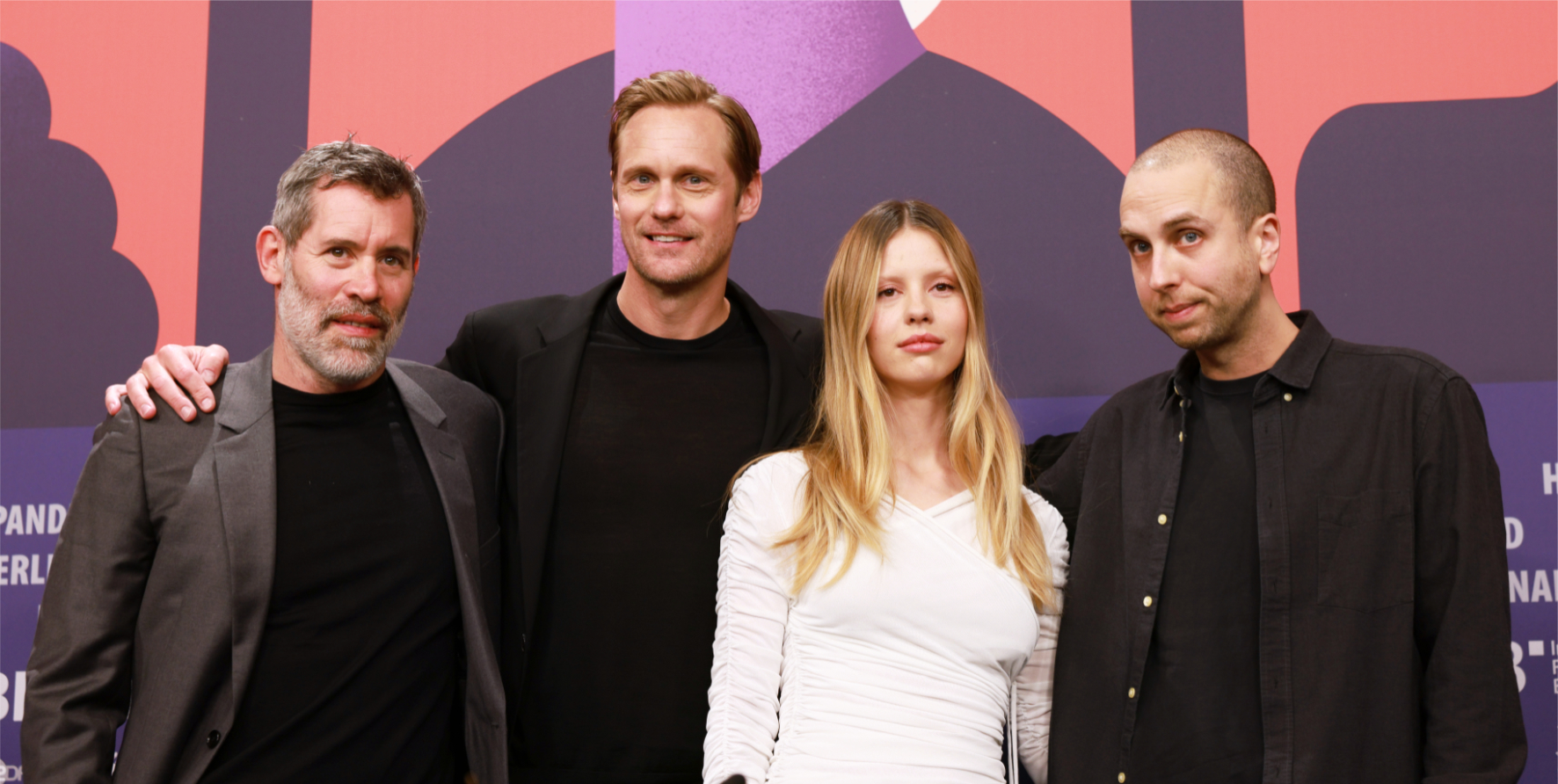
From left to right: Jalil Lespert, Alexander Skarsgård, Mia Goth, and director Brandon Cronenberg

Brandon Cronenberg wrote the original screenplay for Infinity Pool with the intention of directing the film. He developed the story from actual experiences he had on unsatisfying vacations and a science fiction story about killing clones he had been writing. By May 2019, an international co-production had been set up between Canada, Hungary, and France. Filming was slated to begin at the end of 2019. By November 2020, filming locations in Croatia and Hungary were selected, but production was pushed back to 2021. In June 2021, it was announced that distribution would be handled by Elevation Pictures in Canada and Neon in the United States.

=== Casting ===
In June 2021, Alexander Skarsgård was revealed to be starring in the lead role. By the time filming had started, additional casting announcements included Mia Goth, Thomas Kretschmann, Amanda Brugel, Caroline Boulton, John Ralston, Jeff Ricketts, Jalil Lespert and Roderick Hill.

=== Filming ===
Principal photography took five weeks, beginning on September 6, 2021, at the Amadria Park resort in Šibenik, Croatia. After twelve days of shooting, production moved to Budapest, Hungary, where filming was completed. Post-production took place in Toronto, Canada, and was completed during the second half of 2022.

== Release ==
Infinity Pool premiered at the 2023 Sundance Film Festival and was released by Elevation Pictures in Canada on January 27, 2023. The film's European premiere was held at the 73rd Berlin International Film Festival in the Berlinale Special section.

The film was released on VOD on February 14, 2023. The uncut version was made available by Neon on March 7, 2023.

On May 31, 2023, it was announced that Infinity Pool and Cronenberg's previous film Possessor would receive a double feature in three North American theaters in June, with Cronenberg in attendance. The first for both films to theatrically screen in their uncut form, the screenings took place at the Alamo Drafthouse Cinema in San Francisco on the 20th, the Aero Theatre in Los Angeles on the 21st via American Cinematheque, and the Metrograph in New York City on the 23rd.

=== MPA rating ===
For its United States release, an initial cut received an NC-17 rating from the Motion Picture Association (MPA) "for some graphic violence and sexual content". Neon appealed to the Classification and Rating Administration appeals board for an R rating, but the rating was upheld. After re-edits, it achieved an R rating.

== Reception ==
=== Box office ===
Infinity Pool grossed $1.1 million from 1,835 theaters on its first day of release. It went on to debut to $2.7 million, finishing eighth at the box office and out-grossing the lifetime domestic run of the director's father's 2022 release, Crimes of the Future ($2.4 million). It dropped out of the box office top ten in its second weekend with $900,000.

=== Critical response ===
On the review aggregator website Rotten Tomatoes, the film holds an approval rating of 87% based on 233 reviews, with an average rating of 7/10. The site's critical consensus reads, "Turbulent waters even for strong swimmers, Infinity Pool provides a visceral all-inclusive retreat of Cronenbergian perversion for those wanting to escape commercial sundries." On Metacritic, the film has a weighted average score of 72 out of 100 based on 46 critics, indicating "generally favorable reviews". Audiences polled by CinemaScore gave the film an average grade of "C–" on an A+ to F scale, while those polled by PostTrak gave it a 52% positive score, with 28% saying they would definitely recommend it.

Reviewing Infinity Pool following its premiere at Sundance, David Fear of Rolling Stone described the film as being laced with "a rage, an edge and a warped satirical sensibility that feels unique, and uniquely unnerving enough to kill talk of family coattails", praising Cronenberg's screenplay and direction, as well the lead performances. The film is a New York Times Critic's Pick, with Jeannette Catsoulis writing, "Surreal, sophisticated, and sometimes sickening, Infinity Pool suggests that while the elder Cronenberg might be fixated on the disintegration of our bodies, his son is more concerned with the destruction of our souls." Esther Zuckerman of Vanity Fair commended the cast performances (particularly Goth's), but was overall mixed on the film, asserting that it is "provocative with questionable payoff".

Comparing the film to Possessor in a positive Los Angeles Times review, Katie Walsh wrote that Infinity Pool "is larger in scope than its predecessor, the narrative grander, sharper, funnier and more wickedly perverse." Meagan Navarro of Bloody Disgusting also gave the film a positive review, writing, "Cronenberg's sense of style, paired with an unrelenting sense of dread and tension and two utterly captivating, depraved leads ensure these provocative waters are well worth wading into."

In a negative review, Michael O'Sullivan from The Washington Post claimed that the movie has an "eye-roll-inducing plot" and that Cronenberg has inherited some of his father's worst excesses: sophomoric, fetishistic violence and gratuitous sexualization. In another negative review from The Hollywood Reporter, David Rooney claimed that the movie lacks substance and has a silly storyline. IndieWire described the film as shallow, cold and clammy. Mae Abdulbaki of Screen Rant gave the film a two out of five, feeling the story is messy and lacks cohesion. Reuben Baron of Looper noted that the film's attempt at cultural commentary is shallow and that the film gives little reason for viewers to care about its "loathsome characters", although Baron did praise Goth's performance.

=== Awards and nominations ===
Award	Date of ceremony	Category	Nominee(s)	Result	Ref.
Hollywood Critics Association Midseason Film Awards	June 30, 2023	Best Actress	Mia Goth	Nominated	
Hollywood Critics Association Midseason Film Awards	June 30, 2023	Best Horror	Infinity Pool	Nominated	
Directors Guild of Canada Awards	October 21, 2023	Best Direction in a Feature Film	Brandon Cronenberg	Nominated	
Indiana Film Journalists Association	December 17, 2023	Original Vision	Infinity Pool	Nominated	
Phoenix Film Critics Society	December 18, 2023	Best Science Fiction Film	Infinity Pool	Nominated	
Seattle Film Critics Society Awards	January 8, 2024	Villain of the Year	Gabi Bauer (Mia Goth)	Nominated	
Vancouver Film Critics Circle	February 12, 2024	Best Supporting Female Actor in a Canadian Film	Mia Goth	Nominated	
Critics' Choice Super Awards	April 4, 2024	Best Actress in a Horror Movie	Mia Goth	Nominated	
Canadian Screen Awards	May 2024	Best Picture	Karen Harnisch, Andrew Cividino, Christina Piovesan, Noah Segal, Rob Cotterill, Anita Juka, Daniel Kresmery, Jonathan Helperyn	Nominated	
Canadian Screen Awards	May 2024	Best Director	Brandon Cronenberg	Nominated	
Canadian Screen Awards	May 2024	Best Lead Performance in a Drama Film	Mia Goth	Nominated	
Canadian Screen Awards	May 2024	Best Lead Performance in a Drama Film	Alexander Skarsgård	Nominated	
Canadian Screen Awards	May 2024	Best Original Screenplay	Brandon Cronenberg	Nominated	
Canadian Screen Awards	May 2024	Best Cinematography	Karim Hussain	Nominated	
Canadian Screen Awards	May 2024	Best Editing	James Vandewater	Nominated	
Canadian Screen Awards	May 2024	Best Sound Editing	Alex Bullick, Jill Purdy, Rob Bertola, Craig MacLellan	Nominated	
Canadian Screen Awards	May 2024	Best Makeup	Dan Martin, Traci Loader, Svetlana Gutic	Won	
Canadian Screen Awards	May 2024	Best Visual Effects	Andy Robinson	Won	
Canadian Screen Awards	May 2024	Best Casting in a Film	Mark Bennett, Deirdre Bowen	Nominated	
