= Please Speak Continuously and Describe Your Experiences as They Come to You =

2019 Canadian short drama film

- Film poster
- Directed by: Brandon Cronenberg
- Written by: Brandon Cronenberg
- Produced by: Andrew Cividino; Karen Harnisch; Yona Strauss
- Starring: Deragh Campbell; Neil Bennett
- Cinematography: Karim Hussain
- Edited by: James Vandewater
- Music by: Jim Williams
- Production company: Film Forge Productions
- Release date: May 16, 2019 (Cannes)
- Running time: 9 minutes
- Country: Canada
- Language: English

Please Speak Continuously and Describe Your Experiences as They Come to You is a 2019 Canadian science fiction thriller short film written and directed by Brandon Cronenberg. The film stars Deragh Campbell as Emily, an institutionalized woman who is describing her dreams to psychiatrist Dr. Fino (Neil Bennett).

The film premiered at the 2019 Cannes Film Festival, and had its North American premiere at the 2019 Toronto International Film Festival. In December 2019, the film was named to TIFF's annual year-end Canada's Top Ten list for short films.
