= Spice It Up =

2018 Canadian film

- Film poster
- Directed by: Lev Lewis; Yonah Lewis; Calvin Thomas
- Produced by: Yonah Lewis; Calvin Thomas
- Starring: Jennifer Hardy CK; Shivali Barot; Samantha Cole; Déjah Dixon-Green; Jennifer Graydon; Becca Willow Moss; Micaela Robertson; Sara Sue Vallee
- Music by: Lev Lewis
- Production company: Lisa Pictures
- Distributed by: MDFF
- Release date: September 28, 2018 (VIFF)
- Running time: 82 minutes
- Country: Canada
- Language: English
- Budget: $5,000

Spice It Up is a 2018 Canadian independent film directed by Lev Lewis, Yonah Lewis and Calvin Thomas. It stars Jennifer Hardy CK as a young film student attempting to finish her thesis project. The film-within-the-film tells the story of a group of teenage girls who fail high school and enlist in the army.

The film premiered at the Vancouver International Film Festival in the Future//Present section on September 28, 2018, had its international premiere at Buenos Aires International Festival of Independent Cinema on April 4, 2019 and had a limited theatrical release in Canada on August 16, 2019.

== Plot ==
Rene is a Ryerson University film student struggling to complete her thesis project. Alone and longing for a little connection, she finds comfort in her work: a feature film, also called Spice It Up, about seven 17-year-old girls who fail their final year of high school and decide to join the Canadian Armed Forces. The film intercuts scenes from Rene's thesis film with her efforts to lock picture.

Rene travels from office to office, defending her work against her professors’ and peers’ condescending notes, all of whom find her film disjointed and tonally challenging. She speaks with one professor who tells her to pare down the large cast and focus on a single character, another who suggests transforming the feature-length film into a web series, and a third who tries to match characters to philosophical doctrines.

Finally, after much soul searching and many failed attempts, Rene decides to reunite the cast and film new scenes she hopes will fill in the gaps. On the day of the shoot, only one actress returns, and she informs Rene that she and the entire cast have quit the project. Rene films the actress's exit, hoping for a scrap of new footage to incorporate into her troubled project.

== Cast ==
- Jennifer Hardy CK as Rene
- Shivali Barot as Shivali
- Samantha Cole as Sam
- Déjah Dixon-Green as Déjah
- Jennifer Graydon as Jenny
- Becca Willow Moss as Becca
- Micaela Robertson as Mick
- Sara Sue Vallee as Sara
- Taylor Baldwin as Graham
- Andre Guantanamo as Recruiting Officer
- Igor Drljaca as Second Professor
- Matt Johnson as Passport Photographer
- Adam Nayman as Rueben Lewis
- Gabriele Leclaire as Rene's Mother
- Sophy Romvari as Rene's Sister
- Albert Shin as Third Professor
- Yolande Williams as The O.C.

== Production ==
Principal photography began in Toronto on June 22, 2013, and was completed almost five years later on May 6, 2018.

The nested film was shot first and, at that time, intended to be its own standalone narrative, but after several years of editing and re-editing, the directors felt something was missing. They brought on a second set of actors and shot a framework story that re-contextualized the original film. Many of the roles in the framework section are played by local Toronto filmmakers, including Igor Drljaca, Sophy Romvari and Albert Shin, as well as film critic Adam Nayman as Rene's thesis advisor.

The original production was inspired by dance films like Bring It On (2000) and Step Up (2006), as well as Brian De Palma's early essay films. The directors hoped to mix the two contrasting genres and create something wildly different from their previous effort, The Oxbow Cure, an austere and nearly-wordless film focused on a single protagonist. The film-within-a-film footage was shot on two GoPro cameras. "We wanted something wide, loud, lo-fi and jarring. The GoPro lens is so wide that we had to crop or paint the boom out of almost every shot," recalled the directors in a 2018 interview.

== Reception ==
Jennifer Hardy CK was nominated for Best Actress in a Canadian Film by the Vancouver Film Critics Circle after the film premiered at the Vancouver International Film Festival in 2018. MUBI's Lawrence Garcia called the film "the vaunted highlight" of the 2018 Future//Present section of the Vancouver International Film Festival, writing, "Spice It Up manages an impressive and oddly moving sleight-of-hand, affirming the vitality of a genuinely personal cinematic vision while acknowledging that the majority of such are doomed to becoming, at best, fringe efforts."

During its theatrical run in Toronto, the film received generally positive reviews from critics. The Globe and Mail's Barry Hertz named it one of the top ten Canadian films of the year, writing, "for those with a taste for bold cinematic gambits, it pays off beautifully." Angelo Muredda for Cinema Scope opined, "Spice It Up proves a beguiling and tricky film about the minutiae of making and showing films, and coming into oneself as an artist in the process, in Toronto’s sometimes hostile and typically male-dominated film scene." National Post's Chris Knight called it "a lovely, funny story about thwarted artistic creativity," and NOW Magazine's Norman Wilner praised it as "something else entirely – something new, different and strange."
