= The Tower That Built a City =

2026 documentary film

- Directed by: Mark Myers
- Produced by: Mark Myers; Luke Myers
- Release date: May 1, 2026 (Hot Docs)
- Running time: 92 minutes
- Country: Canada
- Language: English

The Tower That Built a City is a 2026 Canadian documentary film about the CN Tower and its vicinity in Toronto, Ontario, Canada. The film is directed by Mark Myers. Caitlin Cronenberg is one of the executive producers. It premiered at the Hot Docs Canadian International Documentary Festival in May 2026.

== Reception ==
Beatriz Ferreira of NOW wrote, "Overall, the film is a definite gem for the Toronto curious minds, especially those who love to learn more about the city's history."
