= Calvin Thomas (director) =

Canadian film director and screenwriter

- Born: November 29, 1986 (age 39); Calgary, Alberta, Canada
- Occupations: Film director, producer, screenwriter
- Years active: 2011–present
- Known for: White Lie
- Website: lisapictures.com

Calvin Thomas (born November 29, 1986) is a Canadian film director and screenwriter, who collaborates on most of his work with Yonah Lewis. The duo are most noted for their 2019 film White Lie, which was a Canadian Screen Award nominee for Best Motion Picture and garnered them nominations for Best Director and Best Original Screenplay at the 8th Canadian Screen Awards.

Both alumni of Sheridan College, Thomas and Lewis released their debut feature film Amy George in 2011. They followed up with The Oxbow Cure in 2013 and Spice It Up in 2018 before releasing White Lie. In addition to their Canadian Screen Award nominations, they also won the Vancouver Film Critics Circle award for Best Screenplay for a Canadian Film in 2019.

== Filmography ==
Year	Film	Type	Director	Writer	Producer	Notes
2011	Amy George	Feature film	Yes	Yes	Yes	Directorial debut
2013	The Oxbow Cure	Feature film	Yes	Yes	Yes	
2016	Never Eat Alone	Feature film	No	No	Yes	Directed by Sofia Bohdanowicz
2016	The Intestine	Feature film	No	No	Yes	Directed by Lev Lewis
2017	Maison du Bonheur	Documentary	No	No	Yes	Directed by Sofia Bohdanowicz
2018	Veslemøy's Song	Short film	No	No	Yes	Directed by Sofia Bohdanowicz
2018	Spice It Up	Feature film	Yes	Yes	Yes	
2019	MS Slavic 7	Feature film	No	No	Yes	Directed by Sofia Bohdanowicz and Deragh Campbell
2019	White Lie	Feature film	Yes	Yes	Yes	
2020	Every Day's Like This	Short film	No	No	Yes	Directed by Lev Lewis
