= Claudia Dey =

Canadian writer, based out of Toronto

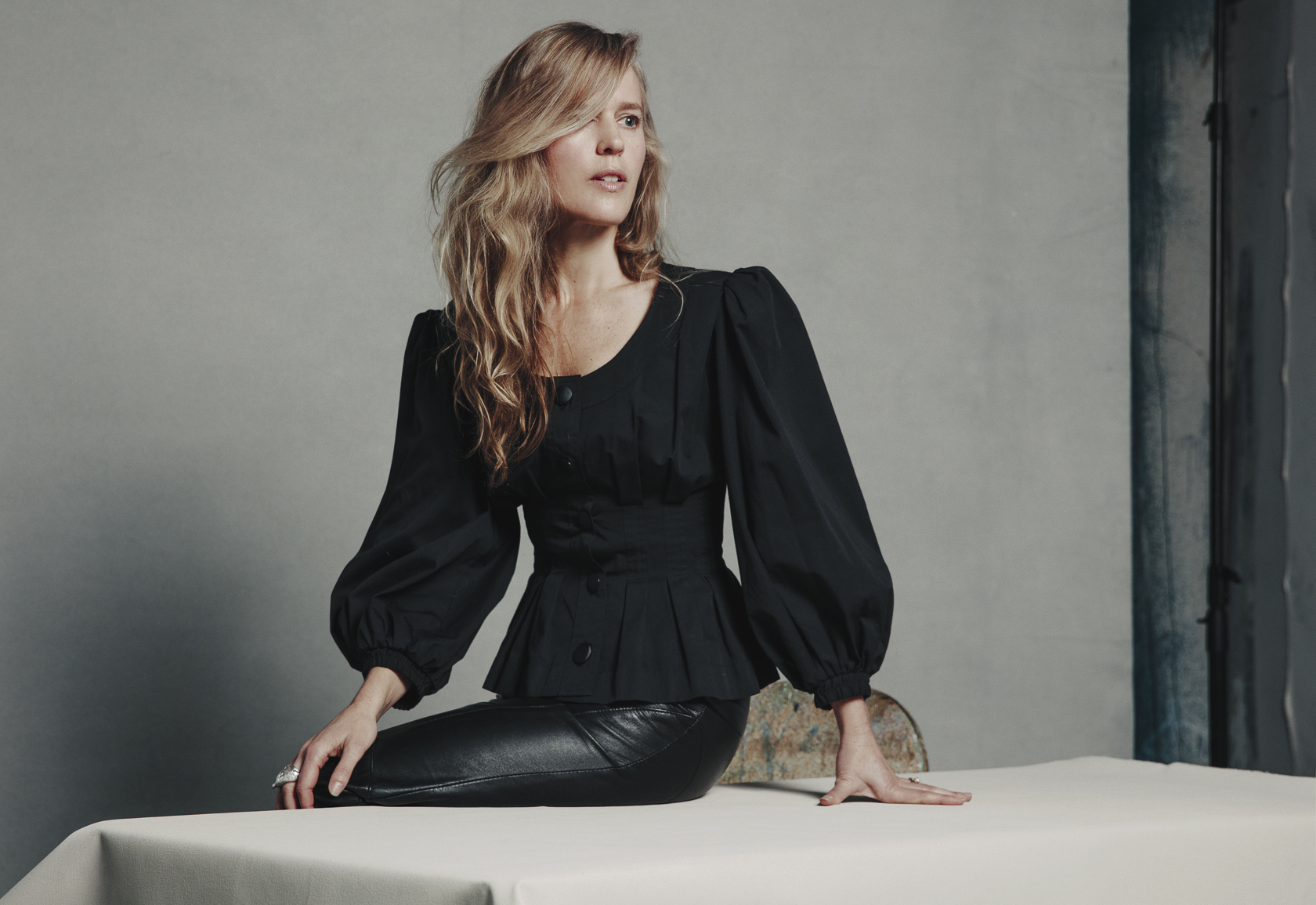
- Born: 1972 or 1973 (age 53–54); Toronto, Ontario
- Education: McGill University; National Theatre School of Canada
- Occupation: Writer
- Spouse: Don Kerr

Claudia Dey (born c. 1972/1973) is a Canadian writer, based out of Toronto.

== Education ==
Dey studied at St. Clement's before graduating in 1991 and moving on to study English literature at McGill University and playwriting at the National Theatre School of Canada, where she graduated in 1997.

== Career ==
Dey's first novel, Stunt, was published by Coach House Books. It was one of The Globe and Mail's "2008 Globe 100" and Quill and Quire's "Books of the Year." It was nominated for the Amazon First Novel Award.

Dey's second novel, Heartbreaker, was published by Random House (U.S.), HarperCollins (Canada), and The Borough Press (U.K.) It was listed by Publishers Weekly in "Writers to Watch Fall 2018: Anticipated Debuts" and was on The Millions "Most Anticipated: The Great Second Half 2018 Book Preview".

From 2007 to 2009, Dey wrote the "Group Therapy" column in The Globe and Mail. She also wrote the sex column in Toro under the pseudonym Bebe O'Shea. Her writing and interviews have been published in The Paris Review, and The Believer.

Her 2023 novel, Daughter, was shortlisted for the Carol Shields Prize for Fiction in 2024.

She is also the author of several plays: Beaver (2000), The Gwendolyn Poems (2002) and Trout Stanley (2005). They have been performed in Toronto, Montreal, New York and Vancouver. The Gwendolyn Poems, about Canadian poet, Gwendolyn MacEwen, was nominated for the 2002 Governor General's Awards and the Trillium Book Award.

In addition to her literary work, Dey has also acted in three feature films, Amy George (2011), The Oxbow Cure (2013) and The Intestine (2016), and is a co-founder of the design studio and clothing brand, Horses Atelier.

== Personal life ==
Dey married Canadian musician Don Kerr on Ward's Island in 2005. They live in Toronto with their two sons.

== Works ==
- Beaver (2000)
- The Gwendolyn Poems (2002)
- Trout Stanley (2005)
- Stunt (2008)
- How to Be a Bush Pilot: A Field Guide to Getting Luckier (2012)
- Heartbreaker (2018)
- Daughter (2023)
