= The Oxbow Cure =

- Theatrical release poster
- Directed by: Yonah Lewis; Calvin Thomas
- Written by: Yonah Lewis; Calvin Thomas; Lev Lewis
- Produced by: Karen Harnisch; Yonah Lewis; Calvin Thomas
- Starring: Claudia Dey
- Cinematography: Yonah Lewis; Calvin Thomas; Ian Carleton
- Edited by: Lev Lewis
- Music by: Lev Lewis
- Release dates: April 12, 2013 (Sarasota Film Festival); August 23, 2013 (Canada)
- Running time: 79 minutes
- Country: Canada
- Language: English

The Oxbow Cure is a 2013 Canadian independent film directed by Yonah Lewis and Calvin Thomas. It stars writer Claudia Dey as Lena, a woman who moves away from the city to a remote cottage in an attempt to heal herself and escape from her past.

The film premiered at the Sarasota Film Festival in the Independent Visions Competition on April 12, 2013 and had a limited theatrical release in Canada on August 23, 2013.

== Plot ==
Lena is a middle-aged woman who has recently been diagnosed with ankylosing spondylitis. In an attempt to come to terms with her transforming body, she leaves her home in the city and her ailing father to begin a new life at a remote cottage in Northern Ontario. There she begins to create an interior routine while exploring the natural world encircling the cottage.

Lena learns of her father’s death and mourns the loss from afar. Later, she watches as an emaciated figure hobbles across the frozen lake outside her cottage. She locks the door and tries to push the image from her mind, but the figure remains a source of both fear and fascination. The following day, Lena hikes through the forest, seeking the creature. She finds a few signs: a claw-mark in the trunk of a tree, a patch of half-eaten berries.

As the sun descends, she realizes she is lost and the temperature is dropping. Just as the forest goes dark and panic sets in, an ethereal, pulsing light appears in the trees. Lena follows it back to her property, but instead of returning to the safety of her cottage, she chooses to pursue the flickering orb out onto the ice. The light extinguishes, leaving Lena alone on the lake and unable to find her way back to the shore, she succumbs to the cold.

The next morning, Lena awakes and stumbles home. After nursing herself back to health, she decides draw the creature to her. Returning to the bramble of berries, she picks every last one and lays a trail from the lake to her front door. That night, the creature appears. Lena lets it in and the two observe one another hesitantly. Lena loses physical control, but the creature’s presence calms her. She touches its face, revealing an eyeball beneath the dried flesh. It rears up in pain, its eye freshly exposed to the light. After darkening the room, Lena comforts the thrashing creature. Slowly it calms and they lie together on the floor.

Still locked in a tight embrace, the creature is awoken by the morning sunlight streaming in through the windows. Lena watches in horror as it bolts away in agony. Days pass and the sun begins to thaw the snow and ice, exposing a world of green below. Somewhere in the woods, the creature, now dead, is revealed beneath the melting snow.

== Cast ==
- Claudia Dey as Lena
- Grace Glowicki
- Marvin Weintraub
- John Gastold
- Adam Barnes
- David Runham

== Production ==
=== Development ===
On January 17, 2012 a Kickstarter campaign was launched with a fundraising target of $12,000 under the working title of Condition of the Heart. On February 17, 2012 funding closed with $12,150 pledged by 117 people. The film was partially financed through a grant from the Toronto Arts Council. Telefilm Canada provided completion funds through their Low Budget Independent Feature Film Assistance Program.

The film was influenced by the 1963 Swedish documentary Ingmar Bergman Makes a Movie, in which property master Karl-Arne Bergman discusses how his recent ankylosing spondylitis diagnosis is transforming his physical and emotional life. Yonah Lewis noted, "We instantly loved the way Karl-Arne was talking about the inevitability of it, about having to come to terms with the disease, that there was nothing you can change. It doesn’t kill you, you aren’t done but your life is changed in a way that is forever altered."

=== Casting ===
Claudia Dey, who the directing pair had worked with on their previous film, Amy George, was cast in the lead role. "Casting is always really hard for us, and we really don’t like it very much," explained Calvin Thomas. "We had worked with Claudia before, and we wrote her and said “Do you know of any buddies who might want to do this?” And she wrote back and said, “I would do it." We never thought to ask her because she had just had a baby and she was busy working on a new book, and it just never occurred to us."

=== Filming ===
Lewis and Thomas, and the film's third screenwriter, Lewis' younger brother, Lev Lewis, set the story in the dead of winter, but there was an early-March thaw in Hunstville, Ontario during principal photography they weren't prepared for. "We would get our really small crew to shovel snow from one location to another to make it look like we had more of it than we did, but eventually we just had to give up and sort of let spring just happen. It changed the movie in a great way," said Thomas. Adding that it's "super Canadian to make a film about being afraid of weather and the seasons."

The opening of the film and the few flashbacks were shot as pick-ups back in Toronto during the edit. "There was nothing in the original screenplay other than just the cabin. Through watching other cuts of it and showing it to friends and other people, we realized there needed to be a little bit more contrast to talk about where she was coming from and where she was going, and you couldn’t get any sense of that before," explained Lewis.

=== Music ===
The score for The Oxbow Cure was written by Lev Lewis. The film features two songs, "My Prayer" and "With These Hands", performed by P.J. Proby.

== Reception ==
The film received generally positive reviews from critics during its limited theatrical run. NOW Magazine's José Teodoro called it "a strikingly intimate and imaginative journey into the phantasmagoric wilderness." The Globe and Mail's Adam Nayman praised it as "a potent and poetic piece of portraiture that doubles as a hymn to the frostbitten Muskokan landscape." Jason Anderson for Cinema Scope wrote, "Though feelings of fear and pain are palpable in almost every moment of The Oxbow Cure, a curious sense of exhilaration cuts through the frigid dead. Maybe that’s due to the co-directors’ Yonah Lewis and Calvin Thomas’ possible realization that they’ve managed to do something uncommonly brave within a Canadian system that bristles at anything resembling an authentic challenge to prevailing norms." Andrew Parker for That Shelf described the film as "the kind of art that makes people household names and will cause those who see it to remark upon it for years to come."
