= We Ate the Children Last =

2011 Canadian short film

- Directed by: Andrew Cividino
- Written by: Andrew Cividino; Geoffrey Smart
- Based on: We Ate the Children Last by Yann Martel
- Produced by: Josh Clavir; Karen Harnisch; Jonathan M. Hodgson
- Starring: Keith Berry; David Disher; Frank Longo; Ryan Ward
- Cinematography: Stephen Chandler Whitehead
- Edited by: James Vandewater
- Music by: Chris Thornborrow
- Production company: Film Forge Productions
- Release date: September 14, 2011 (TIFF)
- Running time: 15 minutes
- Country: Canada
- Language: English

We Ate the Children Last is a 2011 Canadian satirical science fiction short film directed by Andrew Cividino based upon a short story by Yann Martel. The film documents the radical societal shifts that occur after pig organ transplants for humans become commonplace.

The film premiered at the 2011 Toronto International Film Festival, and was named to the festival's annual year-end Canada's Top Ten list.

== Plot ==
A man dying from intestinal cancer volunteers for an experimental treatment which involves receiving the transplanted digestive system of a pig. The transplant is successful, but leaves him with a pig-like penchant for consuming garbage. Considering this an acceptable trade-off for a medical breakthrough, society initially accepts the widespread adoption of the technique, but eventually collapses as the transplant recipients' insatiable appetites evolve into cannibalism.

== Cast ==
- Keith Berry as Patient D
- David Disher as Medical Examiner
- Frank Longo as Simon Winfield
- Ryan Ward as Ricky Rodgers
- Kalista Zackhariyas as Reporter/Principal

== Production ==
Shot in 2010, the film incorporates footage from the 2010 G20 Summit in Toronto.
