= Vampire Dog =

- Theatrical release poster
- Directed by: Geoff Anderson
- Written by: Tracy McMenemy
- Produced by: Holly Baird; Tim Brown; Shayne Putzlocher
- Starring: Collin MacKechnie; Julia Sarah Stone; Amy Matysio; Jodi Sadowsky; Ron Pederson; Norm Macdonald
- Cinematography: Mark Dobrescu
- Edited by: Jason Pielak
- Music by: Ben Lumsden
- Production companies: Joker Films; Trilight Entertainment
- Distributed by: Entertainment One
- Release date: February 16, 2012
- Running time: 91 minutes
- Country: Canada
- Language: English

Vampire Dog is a 2012 Canadian family film directed by Geoff Anderson and starring Collin MacKechnie, Julia Sarah Stone, Amy Matysio, Ron Pederson and Jodi Sadowsky. The vampire dog (Fang) is voiced by Norm Macdonald.

== Plot ==
In Transylvania, a woman in her kitchen cooks a jelly pudding. A dog suddenly appears from nowhere and eats the pudding when she leaves the kitchen. The woman witnesses the dog suddenly disappear. Back at home, the dog's owner questions who should look after the pet after his death.

In Lugosi County, somewhere in North America, twelve-year-old Ace and his mother Susan arrive at their new home. Ace plays drums well but suffers from stage fright. Susan gets work as an additional music teacher at the local high school which will be closing after the current year.

Though the current music teacher, who is also the school's principal, Barry Hickman, discourages students and doubts their skills, Susan thinks the right approach will help the kids. She involves the school in a talent show, which, if they win, will save the school from closure. Hickman assigns Ace to play drums, but Ace panics and falls off his stool. The other students record this; since Ace is also the son of the new teacher, he is teased and ostracized. Skylar befriends Ace, though she tries to hide it from the other students.

Susan gets a letter from a notary: her late husband's father has died, and Ace has inherited his old dog, Fang. Later, a trunk is delivered; inside is apparently a regular dog.

A television program shows an interview regarding a woman from Transylvania and the incident with the dog. Doctor Warhol sees the show, and is now sure: the legend of the vampire dog is true. Warhol is sure the DNA of the vampire dog will lead to a solution to create a cream that will stop the aging of human skin. She orders her assistant Frank to search for the vampire dog.

The next day, Fang is outside, tied onto a long string. When Ace arrives from school, Fang hides in the shade under the deck. Once inside, Fang starts talking and blames Ace for putting him in the sun: he cannot go out in the sunlight. Ace faints, and Fang drags him to the couch.

After Ace awakens, Fang explains that he is a 600-year-old vampire dog living on jelly pudding. Besides talking, Fang can hypnotize and run at almost the speed of light. Ace forbids Fang to tell his mother - she might faint and hurt herself. He decides not to tell his mother the dog needs jelly pudding to survive, so he smuggles Fang to school each day so the dog can seek pudding in the schools' kitchen and cafeteria.

Meanwhile, Skylar knows the truth about Fang. Fang tells the kids how he turned into a vampire dog 600 years ago when the legendary count Vlad tried to attack the great-great-great-...-great-parents of Ace. Fang attacked the vampire, but was bitten, with the bite turning him into a vampire as a result. After he became immortal, the dog stayed with the family, who declared that their descendants would become Fang’s new owners. After becoming a vampire, Fang ate mostly horse hoofs until discovering jelly pudding. Skylar, a genius in chemistry, knows the reason: jelly pudding contains gelatin, which contains collagen, which for Fang, is a substitute for haemoglobin. Skylar wonders if she can find a way for Fang to walk in the sunlight.

Doctor Warhol and Frank have attempted to kidnap the dog and failed. They then scheme to buy up all the gelatin in town to lure the dog but fail again. Not much later, Fang is found by the school caretaker and brought to a pet shelter. His mother grounds Ace for taking the dog to school and refuses to get his dog back because she has to save her career and the school. Despite being grounded, Ace and Skylar visit the pet shelter to save Fang from another kidnap attempt by Warhol and Frank. The talent show takes place that evening. Susan's class performance is stopped by Hickman, exposing that the drummer is using a drum computer to cheat. Warhol bribed Hickman and the drummer (his nephew Murray Arbuckle) to doom the school so that she could build her chemical company on the land. The contest jury rules that the group can continue if another drummer can be found. Ace appears and plays drums without his stage fright. His school wins and is saved. Susan is proud of her son. The corrupt Hickman is fired, while Arbuckle is assigned to the instrument triangle instead of drums. Ace becomes a very popular boy. Skylar finds out Fang only needs to take a special medicine against his sun allergy. Warhol and Frank are arrested by police and declared lunatics after claiming Fang is a vampire dog. Later, the kids go to the park with Fang to try out the allergy medicine, which is successful, and now, Fang can play in the sun and enjoy life like a normal dog.

== Production ==
The film was shot on locations in Regina and Moose Jaw, Saskatchewan, Canada, and is Geoff Anderson's debut as feature film director. It was one of the last films to take advantage of the Saskatchewan Film Employment Tax Credit; the production company announced it was moving to Alberta due to the end of the credit.

== Releases ==
Vampire Dog was released on DVD, for streaming, and download on-demand in 2012.

== Reception ==
The Common Sense Media review in 2012 stated that the film had "anti-bullying messages weighed down by predictable plot", further calling it "logic impaired", and giving it two (of five) stars. In its advice to parents, it cited "silly slapstick action with nothing scary and no serious consequences", and rated the film as suitable for seven-year-olds.

Couch Critics reviewer Sarah Jehnzen approved the film for all families, but gave the film two (of five) stars, stating that the film lacked "laughs" until the blooper scenes, and that the two plot lines "didn't mesh well."
