= Amy George =

- Promotional poster
- Directed by: Yonah Lewis; Calvin Thomas
- Written by: Yonah Lewis; Calvin Thomas
- Produced by: Yonah Lewis; Calvin Thomas
- Starring: Gabriel del Castillo Mullally; Claudia Dey; Don Kerr
- Cinematography: Yonah Lewis; Calvin Thomas
- Edited by: Yonah Lewis; Calvin Thomas
- Music by: Lev Lewis
- Distributed by: Mongrel Media
- Release date: April 3, 2011 (Wisconsin)
- Running time: 95 minutes
- Country: Canada
- Language: English

Amy George is a 2011 Canadian microbudget film written, produced and directed by Yonah Lewis and Calvin Thomas. The film tells the story of the 13-year-old Jesse who wants to be an artist, but believes that his mundane middle class life has left him unprepared. After reading a book on what it takes to be a "true-artist", he sets out looking for risk, ecstasy, wildness and women.

It premiered at the Wisconsin Film Festival on April 3, 2011 and had its Canadian premiere in the Canada First! section of the 2011 Toronto International Film Festival.

== Plot ==
Thirteen-year-old Jesse is assigned a school project: a photographic self-portrait intended to portray one's self without resorting to literal representation. Jesse lives with his parents, Sabi and Tim, in the lefty, middle class Toronto neighbourhood of Riverdale. A quiet and distant only-child with budding artistic aspirations, Jesse is inspired by the assignment to look for excitement and meaning in the world around him. Wielding a newly acquired 35mm camera, Jesse sets out to capture his surroundings, but soon realizes the undramatic nature of his family, neighbourhood and existence.

Meanwhile, Sabi and Tim find themselves questioning Jesse's developing character as they watch him abandon his childhood personality and mature into an uncommunicative adolescent. Frustrated by his lack of inspiration, Jesse discovers a book in the school library which advises him, "You can never be a real artist until you have made love to a woman." Taking the text at face value and with the encouragement of a family friend, Jesse begins to look for new experiences, both foreign and adult, which leads him to an encounter with his young, female neighbour, Amy. Peering into her bedroom window at night, he snaps a quick photograph of her.

Days later, the two are inadvertently reunited, allowing Jesse an opportunity to explore his prepubescent fascination with the opposite sex. After a long evening of games, exploration and attempted hypnosis, Jesse awakes with confusion and guilt, unsure whether or not he may have overstepped his boundaries. The question of rape consumes his thoughts and Jesse is left struggling to reconcile his uneasy mind.

== Cast ==
- Gabriel del Castillo Mullally as Jesse
- Claudia Dey as Sabi
- Don Kerr as Tim
- Natasha Allan as Tara
- Emily Henry as Amy
- Candace Barkin as Liv
- Yaari Magenheim as Jake
- Brian Scott as Mr. Fontana
- Andrea Verginella Paina as Marianne
- Ester Reyes as Yetta
- David Woroner as Alex

== Production ==
=== Development ===
Amy George was Yonah Lewis and Calvin Thomas' seventh screenplay after graduating from film school in 2008 and an attempt to write something that spoke to their shared experiences. According to Lewis, having been a "really grumpy young male teenager" was the most obvious point of common ground. The first draft, which grappled with the idea that art must come from a place of suffering, was written in two weeks. "We were still ourselves coming to terms with the idea: How can you be an artist if you come from this middle class Canadian happy lifestyle?” explained Lewis.

The film was funded with the assistance of friends and family, including the 15-year-old Connor Jessup, who the directing pair knew from a summer arts camp they had taught at and he attended. Jessup said, "Guys, I wanna be in on the film; I wanna be on the set every day. And I'm gonna give you a significant amount of money."

=== Casting ===
The large teenage cast was primarily found at local schools. Gabriel del Castillo Mullaly who played the lead, Jesse, had never acted before and is the son of Canadian actress Maria del Mar. The characters of Jesse's parents, Sabi and Tim, were played by real-life couple, Claudia Dey and Don Kerr.

=== Filming ===
Principal photography began in and around the Toronto neighbourhood of Riverdale on May 8, 2010. Several scenes take place at neighbourhood parks, including Withrow Park and Riverdale Park. "We'd write about these generic American towns that don't exist, motels in the desert. Eventually we wanted to embrace what was around us. I'm living here in my parents' house at the moment and Calvin would be here and we'd be wandering around and what we'd see would be Withrow Park, Riverdale Park, Gerrard Street," said Lewis.

=== Music ===
The film's minimal score was written by Lewis' younger brother Lev Lewis. The film also features four songs by musician Michael Holt.

== Awards ==
Amy George won the Spirit Award for Feature Narrative at the Brooklyn Film Festival in 2011.
