= Marc Almon =

Canadian filmmaker

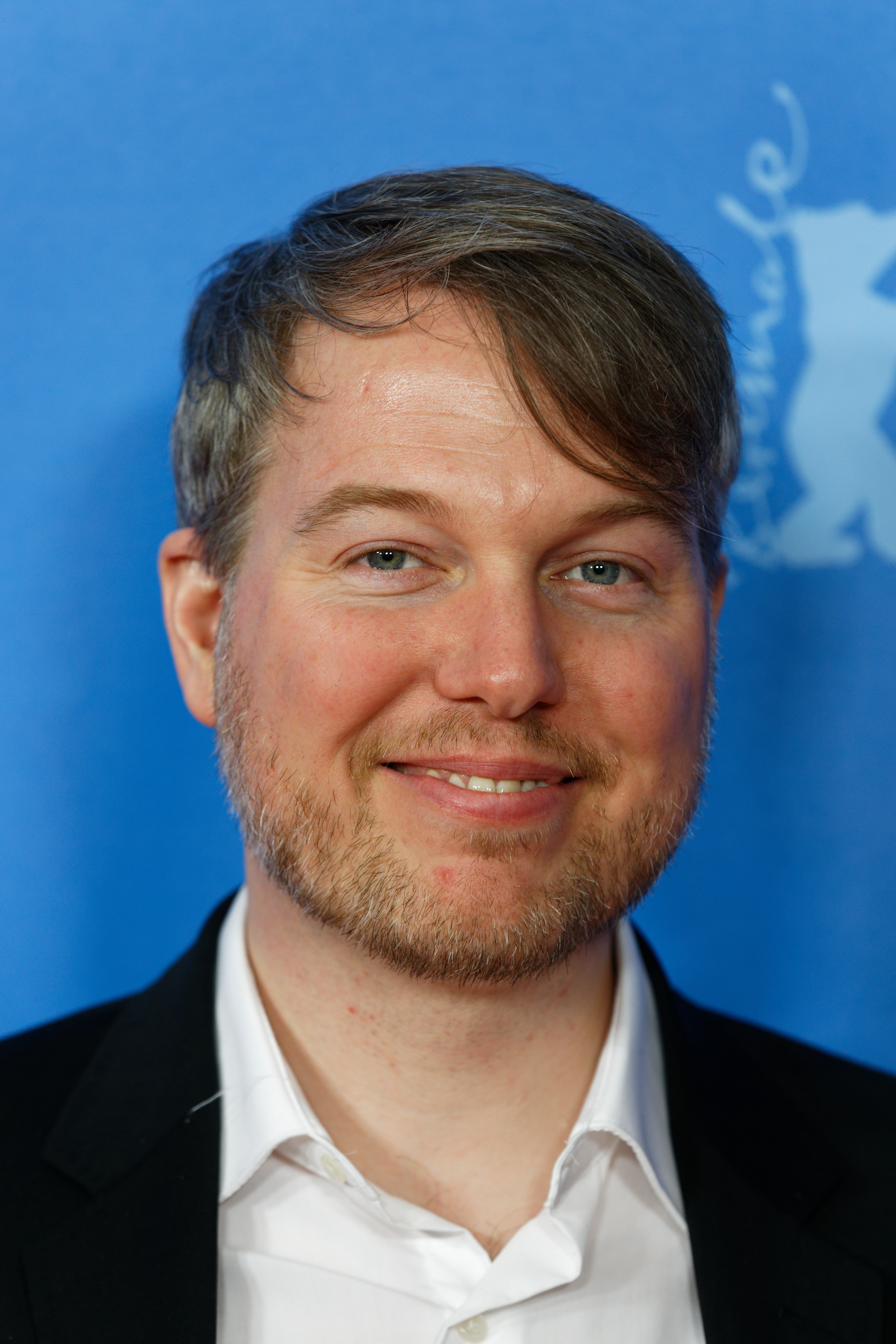
Marc Almon at 2017 Berlinale

Marc Almon is a filmmaker based in Halifax, Nova Scotia, Canada. Almon is best known for his work as the producer of the Canadian feature films Blackbird and Weirdos.

== Career ==
Almon was chosen to be a participant in the Atlantic Filmmakers Co-op Film 5 program for young directors. He subsequently gained credits as a producer, director and writer on a number of award-winning short films, including The Wake of Calum MacLeod and D’Unee Rive a l'Autre (director: Maxime Desmons), which have screened at international film festivals and have aired on CBC, Global, BBC, Bravo! and the Sundance Channel.

Almon was nominated for a Genie Award for Best Live Action Short Film in 2008, won the National Screen Institute Drama Prize in 2010, was a finalist for the TIFF Pitch This! competition, and attended the Rotterdam Lab and Trans Atlantic Partners co-production training program.

Almon's film Blackbird made its debut at the 2012 Toronto International Film Festival, where it won the Best Canadian First Feature Award. Blackbird continued to screen and win awards around the world, including the Grand Prix at Cannes Junior 2013.

In 2013, The Hollywood Reporter named Almon a member of the Next Gen: 20 Young Canadian Stars On the Rise in Hollywood.

In 2015, Almon became the chairman of Screen Nova Scotia, an organization which represents Nova Scotia film, television and digital media. In this role he was involved in negotiations with the provincial government about changes to the film tax credit.

Marc executive produced the film Your Money or Your Wife in 2015 and produced Weirdos in 2016.

== Filmography ==
- Transit (2001)
- The Wake of Calum MacLeod (2006)
- D'une rive à l'autre (2009)
- The Fiddler's Reel (2010)
- Blackbird (2012)
- Your Money or Your Wife (2015)
- Weirdos (2016)
