= Weirdos (film) =

- Film poster
- Weirdos
- Directed by: Bruce McDonald
- Written by: Daniel MacIvor
- Produced by: Marc Almon; Mike MacMillan
- Starring: Dylan Authors; Julia Sarah Stone; Molly Parker; Allan Hawco; Cathy Jones; Rhys Bevan-John
- Release date: 9 September 2016 (Toronto)
- Running time: 85 min
- Country: Canada
- Language: English
- Budget: $1.3 million

Weirdos is a 2016 Canadian drama film directed by Bruce McDonald and written by Daniel MacIvor. It debuted at the 2016 Toronto International Film Festival.

Set in Nova Scotia in 1976, it stars Dylan Authors as Kit, a teenager living in Antigonish who decides to run away to live with his mother in Sydney.

== Plot ==
Kit (Dylan Authors) is a 15-year-old living in a small town in Nova Scotia with his single father Dave (Allan Hawco) and grandmother Mary (Cathy Jones). He is dating Alice (Julia Sarah Stone) despite being unsure of his own sexuality. Deciding that he wants to go live with his mother Laura (Molly Parker) in Sydney, he enlists Alice's help to embark on a hitchhiking trip. Throughout the trip, Kit has regular imaginary conversations with Andy Warhol (Rhys Bevan-John), who has appointed himself Kit's "spirit animal".

== Cast ==
List based on IMDb.

Actor	Character
Dylan Authors	Kit
Julia Sarah Stone	Alice
Molly Parker	Laura
Allan Hawco	Dave
Cathy Jones	Mary
Vi Tang	Mr. Po
Alex Purdy	Jack
Aria Publicover	Jeanie
Max Humphreys	Leo
Dominique Leblanc	Marylou
Deivan Steele	Nalin
Stephen McHattie	Priest
Mateo Giovannetti	Beans
Kathryn MacLellan	Waitress
Gary Levert	Joe
Francine Deschepper	Val
Jonathan Torrens	Torso of American Man
John Dunsworth	Drunk Driver
Jim McSwain	Artistic Roommate

== Production ==
The film was shot in colour and later converted to black and white. McDonald said, "It's always difficult to shoot black and white because the powers that be, or the funders, are often wanting colour because colour is a bit more normal. (But) in the independent world, sometimes it does offer you those other kind of freedoms like, 'Let's go black and white!' And it's not for everybody, but a lot of people are like, 'Wow, that's just so beautiful in black and white.'"

The film's soundtrack includes a predominantly Canadian lineup of rock and pop songs from the era, including Harry Nilsson's "I Guess the Lord Must Be in New York City", Lighthouse's "Love of a Woman", Gordon Lightfoot's "Summer Side of Life" and "Cotton Jenny", Rush's "Finding My Way", Edward Bear's "Last Song", The Stampeders' "Carry Me", Crowbar's "Oh, What a Feeling", FM's "Phasers on Stun", Patsy Gallant's "From New York to L.A.", Labi Siffre's "Crying Laughing Loving Lying", Murray McLauchlan's "Down by the Henry Moore" and Anne Murray's "Snowbird".

== Reception ==
=== Critical response ===
On review aggregator website Rotten Tomatoes, the film holds an approval rating of 93%, based on 14 reviews, and an average rating of 6.9/10.

Adam Nayman of Cinema Scope stated, "It's nice that this latest work by a filmmaker who has sometimes chased hipness past its expiration date concludes on a note of deliberate, intergenerational non-cool." Brent Mcknight of The Seattle Times remarked, "The young leads are charming and authentic, and the film reminds us all to embrace our own weirdness." The Toronto Star's Peter Howell said that "Weirdos is one of Bruce McDonald's sweetest films." The Hollywood Reporter's Sheri Linden called the film "A lovely, low-key memory piece, vibrant with the awkward grace of adolescence."

=== Awards and nominations ===
Awards	Category	Recipients and nominees	Result
Canadian Screen Awards	Best Motion Picture	Marc Almon, Mike MacMillan and Bruce McDonald	Nominated
Canadian Screen Awards	Best Supporting Actress	Molly Parker	Won
Canadian Screen Awards	Best Original Screenplay	Daniel MacIvor	Won
Canadian Screen Awards	Best Art Direction/Production Design	Matt Likely	Nominated
Canadian Screen Awards	Best Achievement in Costume Design	Bethana Briffett	Nominated
Canadian Screen Awards	Best Editing	Duff Smith	Nominated
Vancouver Film Critics Circle	Best Supporting Actress in a Canadian Film	Molly Parker	Won
Leo Awards	Best Lead Performance by a Female in a Motion Picture	Julia Sarah Stone	Nominated
Canadian Cinema Editors Awards	Best Editing in Feature Film	Duff Smith	Nominated
Directors Guild of Canada Awards	Best Picture Editing - Feature Film	Duff Smith	Nominated
Directors Guild of Canada Awards	Outstanding Directorial Achievement in Feature Film	Bruce McDonald	Won
