= The Unseen (2016 film) =

- Directed by: Geoff Redknap
- Written by: Geoff Redknap
- Produced by: Katie Weekley
- Starring: Aden Young; Camille Sullivan; Julia Sarah Stone; Ben Cotton
- Cinematography: Stephen Maier
- Edited by: Thom Klye
- Music by: Harlow MacFarlane
- Production company: Goonworks Films
- Release date: July 17, 2016 (Fantasia)
- Running time: 97 minutes
- Country: Canada
- Language: English

The Unseen is a 2016 Canadian psychological horror film directed by Geoff Redknap and starring Aden Young, Camille Sullivan, Julia Sarah Stone, and Ben Cotton. It was released in 2016.

== Plot ==
After discovering he inherited a family curse that is slowly turning his body invisible, disgraced former NHL hockey player Bob Langmore abandoned his wife Darlene and young daughter Eva to spare them from his suffering. Living in isolation as a logger for the past eight years, Bob tries slowing his transformation with illegal drugs while contemplating suicide.

Darlene calls Bob to warn him about Eva’s increasing disobedience and worrisome plan to travel with friends instead of attending college. Unable to go through with killing himself, Bob abruptly quits his job and leaves town, but crashes his truck when he has a bodily breakdown while driving.

His truck totaled and his ribcage cracked, Bob calls his drug dealer Nelson for assistance. Nelson calls his boss Crisby, who meets with Bob personally. Crisby makes a deal to fix the truck in exchange for Bob delivering a black bear organ and couriering back another package from black market contacts Milton and Bishop. Bob reluctantly agrees in order to use the opportunity to visit Eva and Darlene while making the run.

Darlene, who is now in a relationship with her girlfriend Molly, allows Bob to stay on her couch. Bob has a few awkward interactions with his daughter, one of which involves Eva asking about her grandfather’s history with mental illness.

Bob delivers the organ to Milton and Bishop. He is given a package to bring back to Crisby in return. Crisby begins hounding Bob over the phone to come back, but Bob dismisses Crisby, insisting he will return on his own time.

On a dare, Eva sneaks into the abandoned wing of Mountainview mental hospital with her friends Amelia, Benjy, and Oggy. During a frightful encounter, Amelia is horrified to discover that Eva is showing signs of turning invisible. The teens are chased by a security guard, but they are able to escape when something unseen attacks the guard.

Eva is captured by a Chinese doctor fascinated with her condition. Once they realize she is missing, Bob and Darlene go on a frantic search for their daughter that eventually leads them to Mountainview.

Bob’s aggressive behavior at the Mountainview facility results in his detainment. Dr. Amherst, who treated Bob’s father, tells Bob that his father did not commit suicide as Bob believed. Rather, he intentionally burned himself so that Bob would not discover his condition. Amherst also claims that Bob’s father did not die, although his current whereabouts are unknown. Amherst tries convincing Bob to remain at the facility for treatment, but Bob sneaks out during the night.

Bob uncovers that Eva is also turning invisible and that her interest in his father’s condition led her to the hospital. Eventually, Bob tracks Eva to the Chinese grocery where she is being held captive in a cage in the back room. Bob rescues her.

Bob decides to return to his home. Because Bob is so debilitated by his worsening transition into invisibility, Darlene agrees to let Eva drive him.

On the way back, Bob gives Milton’s package to Nelson and instructs him to deliver it to Crisby. Crisby later opens it and discovers only a bagful of metal bolts.

Eva stays with Bob for a while. Bob reveals his plan to kill himself at the mill, explaining that he only wished to see Eva one final time. Over Eva’s protests, Bob leaves for the mill.

Crisby arrives at Bob’s house with a shotgun. Finding Eva alone, Crisby prepares to attack her but Bob, having turned completely invisible, unexpectedly returns and beats Crisby to death. Bob and Eva dump Crisby’s body for a bear to devour.

Eva decides to go to college. During a conversation about their mutual condition, Bob and Eva realise that the invisible presence who rescued Eva in the hospital basement was actually her grandfather, who is still alive. Eva and Bob begin making their way back to Morningview to find Bob’s father.

== Reception ==
=== Critical response ===
On the review aggregator website Rotten Tomatoes, 100% of nine critics' reviews are positive, with an average rating of 8/10.

Variety film critic Dennis Harvey wrote that the film "is ultimately middling as a quasi-sci-fi/horror suspense drama, but it has authentic grit as a story about one man’s struggle with alcoholism and depression." Writing for The Hollywood Reporter, John DeFore found the drug smuggling subplot unnecessary, but gave the film a favourable review overall and interpreted the invisibility plot as "a metaphor for a working class increasingly left out of society's decision-making processes".

=== Awards ===
At the Vancouver Film Critics Circle Awards 2016, Stone was nominated for Best Supporting Actress in a Canadian Film.

The film was nominated at the 5th Canadian Screen Awards in 2017 for Best Sound Editing and Best Visual Effects.

It also received nine nominations at the 2017 Leo Awards, including Best Direction, Screenwriting and Cinematography.
