= Honey Bee (2018 film) =

- Directed by: Rama Rau
- Written by: Bonnie Fairweather; Kathleen Hepburn
- Produced by: Sally Karam
- Starring: Julia Sarah Stone; Martha Plimpton
- Cinematography: Steve Cosens
- Edited by: Michael Pierro
- Music by: Casey Manierka-Quaile
- Release date: December 1, 2018 (Whistler)
- Running time: 93 minutes
- Country: Canada
- Language: English

Honey Bee is a 2018 Canadian drama film written by Bonnie Fairweather and Kathleen Hepburn, directed by Rama Rau and starring Julia Sarah Stone and Martha Plimpton. It is Rau's narrative feature directorial debut.

== Cast ==
- Julia Sarah Stone as Natalie
- Martha Plimpton as Louise
- Steven Love as Ryan
- Michelle McLeod as Chante
- Connor Price as Matt
- Sofia Banzhaf as Cherry
- Maurice Dean Wint as Det. Walker
- Peter Outerbridge as Christian
- Tammy Isbell as Sophia

== Release ==
The film premiered at the 2018 Whistler Film Festival, and was released commercially on September 20, 2019.

== Reception ==
The film has a 100% rating on Rotten Tomatoes based on seven reviews. Brad Wheeler of The Globe and Mail awarded the film two and a half stars out of four.

Norman Wilner of Now gave the film a positive review and wrote that it "doesn’t break new ground for this sort of drama, but it distinguishes itself in its slow accumulation of small moments."

Andrew Parker of TheGATE.ca also gave the film a positive review and wrote, "Anchored by Stone’s best performance to date as the caustic, but perceptive and often sympathetic Natalie, Honey Bee is a character drama that succeeds at every level."
