= Julia Sarah Stone =

Canadian actress (born 1997)

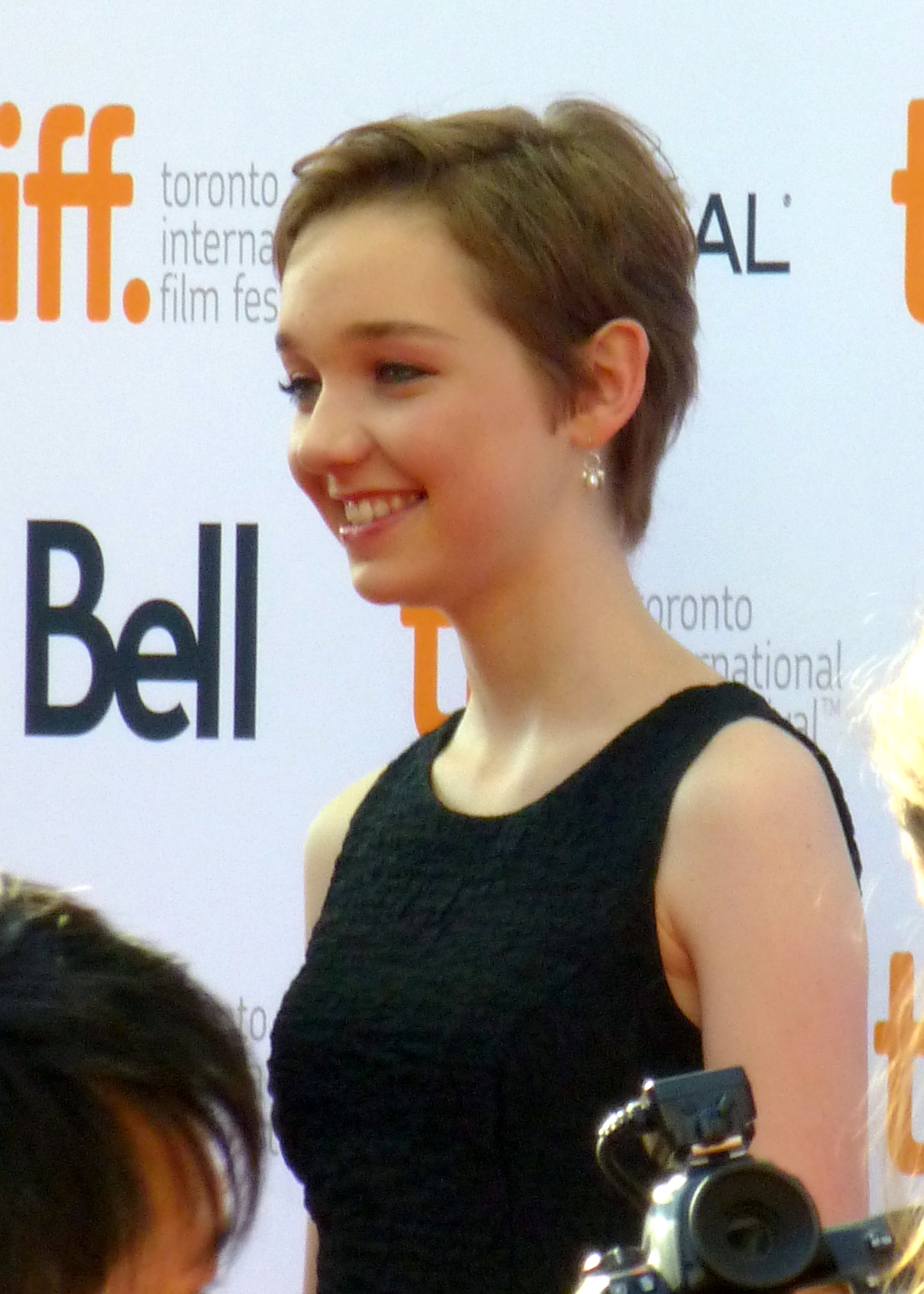
- Stone at the 2014 Toronto International Film Festival
- Born: November 24, 1997 (age 28); Vancouver, British Columbia, Canada
- Occupation: Actor
- Years active: 2009–present

Julia Sarah Stone (born November 24, 1997) is a Canadian actress. She began studying theater at the age of six, and appeared in a number of school plays over the following years. After booking a small part in an independent short film in 2009, she won her breakthrough role in the 2011 feature The Year Dolly Parton Was My Mom, for which she received a Young Artist Award. Stone was subsequently cast in the pilot episode of the CW series Emily Owens, M.D.; the third season of AMC's The Killing; and a number of Canadian-produced independent films.

In addition to her Young Artist Award, she has received several other film accolades. For her role in the feature Wet Bum, Stone was named a Toronto International Film Festival Rising Star in 2014, won the Leo Award in 2015, and was nominated for a Vancouver Film Critics Circle Award. Her performance in the 2016 film The Unseen earned her an additional nomination from the Vancouver Film Critics Circle. In 2019, she won a second Leo Award for her work in the dramatic film Honey Bee.

Stone has won praise for her use of silence and facial expressions on-screen. In a review, RogerEbert.com noted that viewers could gauge the mood of a scene merely by watching Stone. In 2016, she was cast as Dana Copeland in the disaster series Aftermath. She later played the role of Eva, opposite Evan Rachel Wood, in the 2017 dramatic film Allure.

== Early life ==
Stone began performing at the age of six, appearing in plays at elementary school. She developed an interest in professional acting three years later, a pursuit which her parents approved of, but briefly delayed. In an interview with the National Post, Stone's mother stated, "It felt like it was important for Julia to spend another year becoming her before throwing herself into becoming other people." Following a number of roles in student-produced films, Stone began booking independent features. Her first screen role was in the 2009 survival-horror short A Brush of Red, in which she played an unnamed character.

Stone chose to use her middle name professionally to avoid confusion with singer Julia Stone.

== Career ==
=== 2011–2013: Early recognition ===
Stone's breakthrough role came in 2011, when she was cast as an adoptee searching for her birth mother in The Year Dolly Parton Was My Mom. For her performance in the film, Stone won a Young Artist Award and critical acclaim. Liam Lacey of The Globe and Mail noted, "Young actress Julia Stone hits the right notes." Nylon magazine declared that Stone was "about to break out in a big way."

She appears in the opening scene of the 2012 series Emily Owens, M.D., playing a girl named Abbey who initially ridicules the main character, but later comes to admire her. Following other guest parts, and additional work in shorts, Stone booked her first role as a series regular in the TV show The Killing, which she appeared on in 2013. In an interview with The Huffington Post, she described winning the part as "one of the happiest moments of my life". In the series, Stone plays a prostitute who becomes caught in a love triangle with her boyfriend and another girl. "It's really raw, but it's the kind of thing that's happening and it's important to put a light to it," Stone said. "There wasn't anything explicit or unnecessary and they shot it in a way that's supportive to the story. My mom and I saw it similarly—this is an important story that needs to be told." While discussing the character's effect on her, Stone noted, "I really admire that no matter what, she's believing and hoping and having faith in a better future. That's something that I've taken away from this whole experience of playing her, is that no matter what, you can still always have hope. That's something I've learned from her."

While reviewing her work in the role, Pamela Thomas of The Reel Spin noted, "Not only is Stone fearless, gorgeous, and wise beyond her years, she does it all with an effortless grace."

=== 2014–2016: Film breakthrough and Leo Award ===
"Part of my job as an actor is to arrive on-set and be one-hundred percent prepared. I need to know my lines, of course, but I also need to know the journey that the character is going through on that day and in that scene. It's all about being ready emotionally and being very open. I like to arrive on-set and be an open book and absorb things because that's how you become present in a scene."

— Stone in 2016

Stone's work in The Killing led to numerous opportunities in Canadian films. In 2014, she told the National Post, "I feel excited because I keep getting more opportunities to develop my craft and to do what I love. I just hope to be able to keep telling stories and playing characters that mean a lot to me." Canadian director Lindsay MacKay cast Stone in the coming-of-age drama Wet Bum (also titled Surfacing). In the tale, she plays a social outcast who finds solace in swimming and develops unexpected bonds with numerous people. While discussing the film, Stone revealed that she identified with her character's situation: "I think a lot of people have gone through something similar to what she's gone through."

Throughout production, MacKay became impressed with Stone's performance, and regularly sought her input on the role. "Julia brought a lot of herself to the project and I'm grateful—you can get a whole story in the subtleties of the way she reacts to things," she said.

Wet Bum premiered at the Toronto International Film Festival in 2014 and won critical acclaim. Courtney Small of Cinema Axis noted, "The confines of a swimming pool serve as the perfect metaphor for the awkwardness of adolescence," and called Stone's performance "outstanding." Indie-Outlook.com proclaimed Stone "utterly mesmerizing." Matt Fagerholm of RogerEbert.com declared that Stone had delivered "a stunningly raw and unmannered performance." For her work in the role, Stone was chosen as a Toronto International Film Festival Rising Star, received recognition from E!, and won the Leo Award in the category of Best Lead Performance.

Stone had a minor role in the 2015 German film Every Thing Will Be Fine, with James Franco and Charlotte Gainsbourg. The picture generally received unfavorable reviews. She also guest-starred on the TNT series Falling Skies, playing a warrior.

In 2016, Stone starred with Dylan Authors in the film Weirdos, directed by Bruce McDonald. Like 2014's Wet Bum, this film also premiered at the Toronto International Film Festival, and Stone was given top billing in promotional material. Set in 1976, the story follows Kit and his girlfriend Alice (Stone), who embark on a trip to find Kit's mother. As the tale begins, Stone's character is uninhibited and adventurous, but gradually matures. The Vancouver Sun noted, "It becomes clear watching Weirdos that the story is being told from Alice's point of view, something Stone said she didn't realize was happening during filming. The teen pair are on a trip into Kit's past, but Stone's Alice learns the most from the journey." Variety labeled it a film of "self-discovery," and also praised the performances. An article from RogerEbert.com declared, "What makes Weirdos worth a look, above all, is the performance by Stone, who has quickly emerged as one of the most promising actors of her generation."

She later played the role of Dana Copeland in the science-fiction show Aftermath. In the series, Stone portrays a brainy girl whose family struggles to survive an apocalyptic period. Her co-star Taylor Hickson, who plays her twin, was complimentary while noting their rapport, calling Stone "amazing and a sister to me in every way."

She also starred in the fantasy drama The Unseen, playing the troubled daughter of an estranged couple. For her work in the role, Stone was nominated for Best Supporting Actress in a Canadian Film by the Vancouver Film Critics Circle.

=== 2016–present: Additional genres ===
Stone co-starred in the independent feature The Space Between, in which she played a runaway who befriends a man hunting his wife's lover. She described it as a fun shoot and noted, "The character was unlike any other I have played before."

In November 2016, The Hollywood Reporter announced that Carlos and Jason Sanchez had cast Stone in Allure, opposite Evan Rachel Wood. The film follows an emotionally troubled 30-year-old woman named Laura who falls in love with Stone's teenage character Eva, convincing Eva to live with her. Unlike Stone's earlier work in The Killing, the narrative explores mental trauma, manipulation of a minor, and explicit sexual themes. An early review from the Toronto International Film Festival called the tale "a psychological thriller that focuses on a disturbing and obsessive relationship."

Stone labeled it a dark but necessary story, and revealed that she'd enjoyed working with Wood. "This is an incredible, intense, important story and I'm lucky to have been part of telling it," she said. Allure marked the third in a series of Stone's films (following Wet Bum and Weirdos) to premiere at a Toronto International Film Festival.

In June 2018, Stone finished work on the dramatic film Honey Bee, in which she plays a sex-trafficking victim who enters foster care. Her performance earned her the 2019 Leo Award for Lead Female. Mark Hanson of In The Seats gave the film a mixed review, noting, "Stone commits to an all-consuming role that requires her to be in every scene but it's too bad that most of her big moments end up feeling calculated like awards-show clips." In a review for The Gate, Andrew Parker praised the film, declaring that it featured "Stone's best performance to date." Brad Wheeler, writing for The Globe and Mail, found the film average but noted that it was "worth seeing for Stone alone." Norman Wilner of Now Toronto praised Stone's performance, declaring that the film was "all the stronger for having her at the centre of it."

== Acting style ==
Stone has been recognized for her use of silence and facial expressions. Wet Bum director Lindsay MacKay noted, "Our movie is about the unsaid little moments, and with Julia, you can be on her face for 30 seconds and go through five emotions". While reviewing Stone's performance in Allure for The Mary Sue, Teresa Jusino recalled, "You saw every emotion on her face and in her body, and so much of what she conveyed was outside of her dialogue." In a feature on Weirdos, First Weekend Club called Stone's face "lovely" and applauded her work in the film. While reviewing her style, Matt Fagerholm of RogerEbert.com declared, "If you're searching for the emotional truth in a scene, you won't have to look any further than Stone's face. It's all right there."

In 2013, Stone described her interest in psychology as an asset in her work. To immerse herself in roles, she began listening to songs she felt fit the tones of particular scenes, and wrote background stories about her characters.

== Personal life ==
Stone has studied psychology at the University of British Columbia. She grew up admiring Meryl Streep, whose daughter, Mamie, worked with Stone on Emily Owens, M.D. for two episodes.

== Filmography ==
=== Film ===
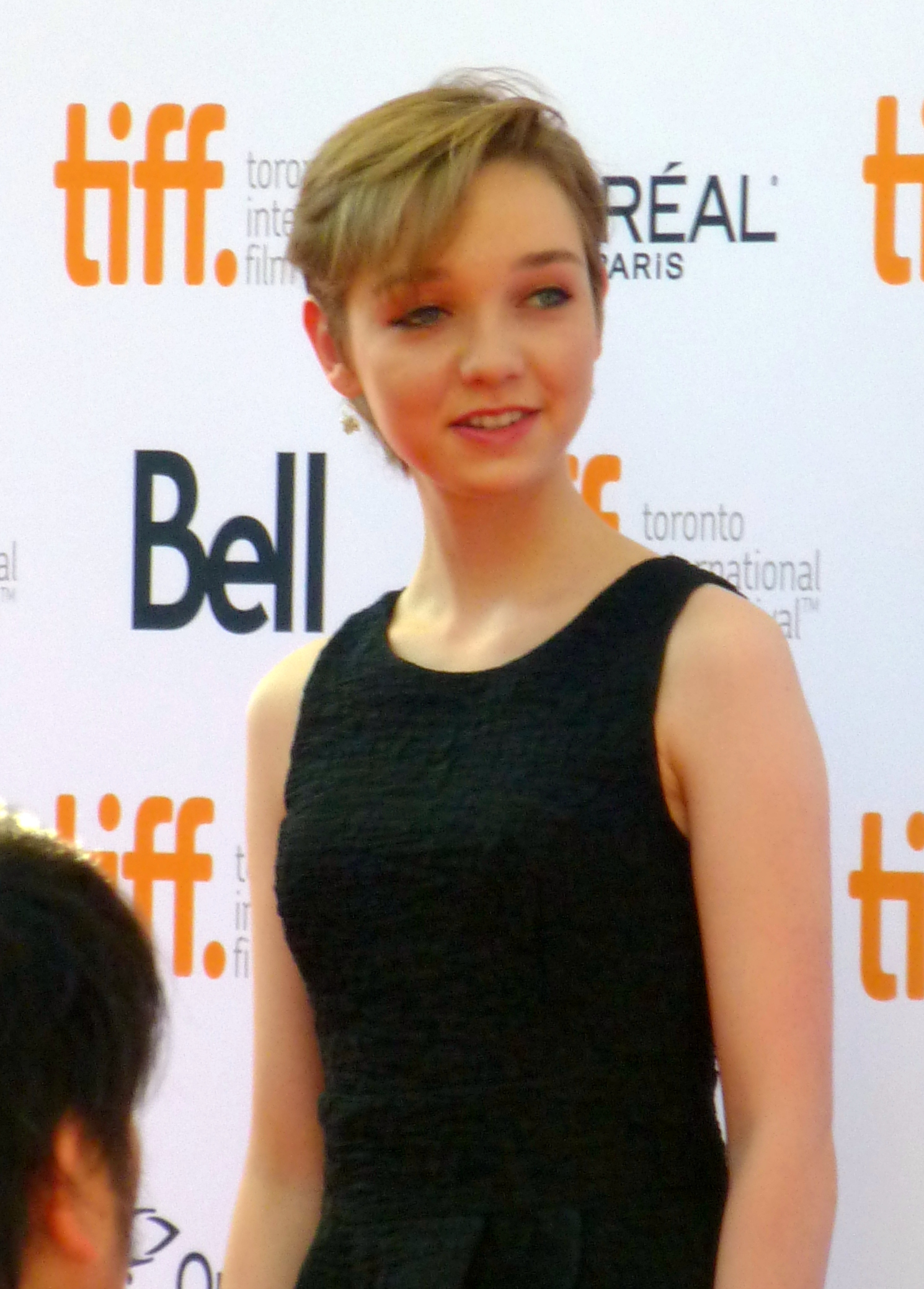
Stone in 2014

Year	Title	Role	Notes
2009	A Brush of Red		Short
2011	The Year Dolly Parton Was My Mom	Elizabeth Gray	
2011	Sunday's Child	Madison Chapman	Short
2011	She's a Soul Man	Lou Cameron	Short
2011	The Pastor's Wife	Hannah Winkler	
2011	Ellipse	Elle	Short
2012	Vampire Dog	Skylar	
2012	Crushed	Carolyn	Short
2013	Tasmanian Devils	Kid	
2013	Calling Out Fire	Rain	Short
2013	Heart of Dance	Anna Charmiachael	
2014	Wet Bum	Samantha	
2014	Rattlesnake	The Stranger	Short
2015	Unearthing	Chris Adams	
2015	Every Thing Will Be Fine	Mina	
2016	The Unseen	Eva	
2016	Weirdos	Alice	
2016	Your Mother and I		Short
2016	The Space Between	Emily	
2017	Allure	Eva	
2018	Honey Bee	Natalie	
2019	The Marijuana Conspiracy	Mary	
2020	Come True	Sarah	
2020	Under the Weather	Maggie	
2020	Marlene	Young Marlene	
2023	Zoe.mp4	Zoe	
2023	Before the World Set on Fire	Hannah	

=== Television ===
Year	Title	Role	Notes
2012	Emily Owens, M.D.	Abbey	Guest star
2013	R. L. Stine's The Haunting Hour: The Series	Sally (2011); Lexi (2012); Naomi (2013)	
2013	The Killing	Lyric	Series regular
2014	How and Why	Acton, Ellis, and Currer	Unaired pilot
2015	Falling Skies	Caitlin	Guest star
2016	Aftermath	Dana Copeland	Series regular
2020	When the Streetlights Go On	Berlice	
2026	Off Campus	Jules Logan	Guest star

== Awards and nominations ==
Award	Year	Film	Category	Result	Ref.
Young Artist Award	2012	The Year Dolly Parton Was My Mom	Best Performance in an International Feature Film—Leading Young Performer	Won	
Vancouver Film Critics Circle	2015	Wet Bum	Best Actress in Canadian Film	Nominated	
Leo Awards	2015	Wet Bum	Best Lead Performance by a Female in a Motion Picture	Won	
Vancouver Film Critics Circle	2016	The Unseen	Best Supporting Actress in a Canadian Film	Nominated	
Leo Awards	2017	Weirdos	Best Lead Performance by a Female in a Motion Picture	Nominated	
Leo Awards	2019	Honey Bee	Best Lead Performance by a Female in a Motion Picture	Won	
