= Zoe.mp4 =

2023 Canadian thriller film

- Directed by: Jeremy Lutter
- Written by: Ryan Bright; Jesse Boyko
- Produced by: Ryan Bright; Jesse Boyko; Jeremy Lutter
- Starring: Emily Tennant; Julia Sarah Stone
- Cinematography: Daniel Carruthers
- Edited by: Dan Krieger
- Production companies: Boyko Media; Bright Idea Pictures; Broken Mirror Films
- Release date: November 30, 2023 (Whistler)
- Running time: 90 minutes
- Country: Canada
- Language: English

Zoe.mp4 is a 2023 Canadian thriller film directed by Jeremy Lutter and written by Ryan Bright and Jesse Boyko. The film stars Emily Tennant as Alina, a serial killer who believes that her motives for killing people are purely altruistic in that she is liberating them from the mundanity and tedium of their unfulfilling lives, and Julia Sarah Stone as Zoe, a young architect she has identified as her next victim.

The cast also includes Osric Chau as Zoe's fiancé Matt, as well as Freya Snow Edwards, Dejan Loyola, Jillian Walchuck, Jesse Boyko and Kate Whiddington in supporting roles.

The film was originally envisioned by screenwriters Ryan Bright and Jesse Boyko as a found footage thriller, but grew into a more conventional film as Lutter and cinematographer Daniel Carruthers drew up their plans for making the film.

It premiered on November 30, 2023, in the Borsos Competition program at the Whistler Film Festival.
