= James Vandewater =

James Vandewater is a Canadian film editor. He is most noted at a two-time Canadian Screen Award nominee for Best Editing, receiving nods at the 4th Canadian Screen Awards in 2016 for Sleeping Giant, and at the 12th Canadian Screen Awards in 2024 for Infinity Pool.

He was also credited as a producer of Sleeping Giant, which was a CSA nominee for Best Picture in 2016.

His other editing credits have included the films We Ate the Children Last, And Now a Word from Our Sponsor, The Other Half, The Grizzlies, Body and Bones, Please Speak Continuously and Describe Your Experiences as They Come to You, See for Me, V/H/S/94, Seance and Sweet Angel Baby, and the television series New Eden, Tales from the Territories and Dark Side of the Ring.
