= Caitlin Cronenberg =

Canadian photographer (born 1984)

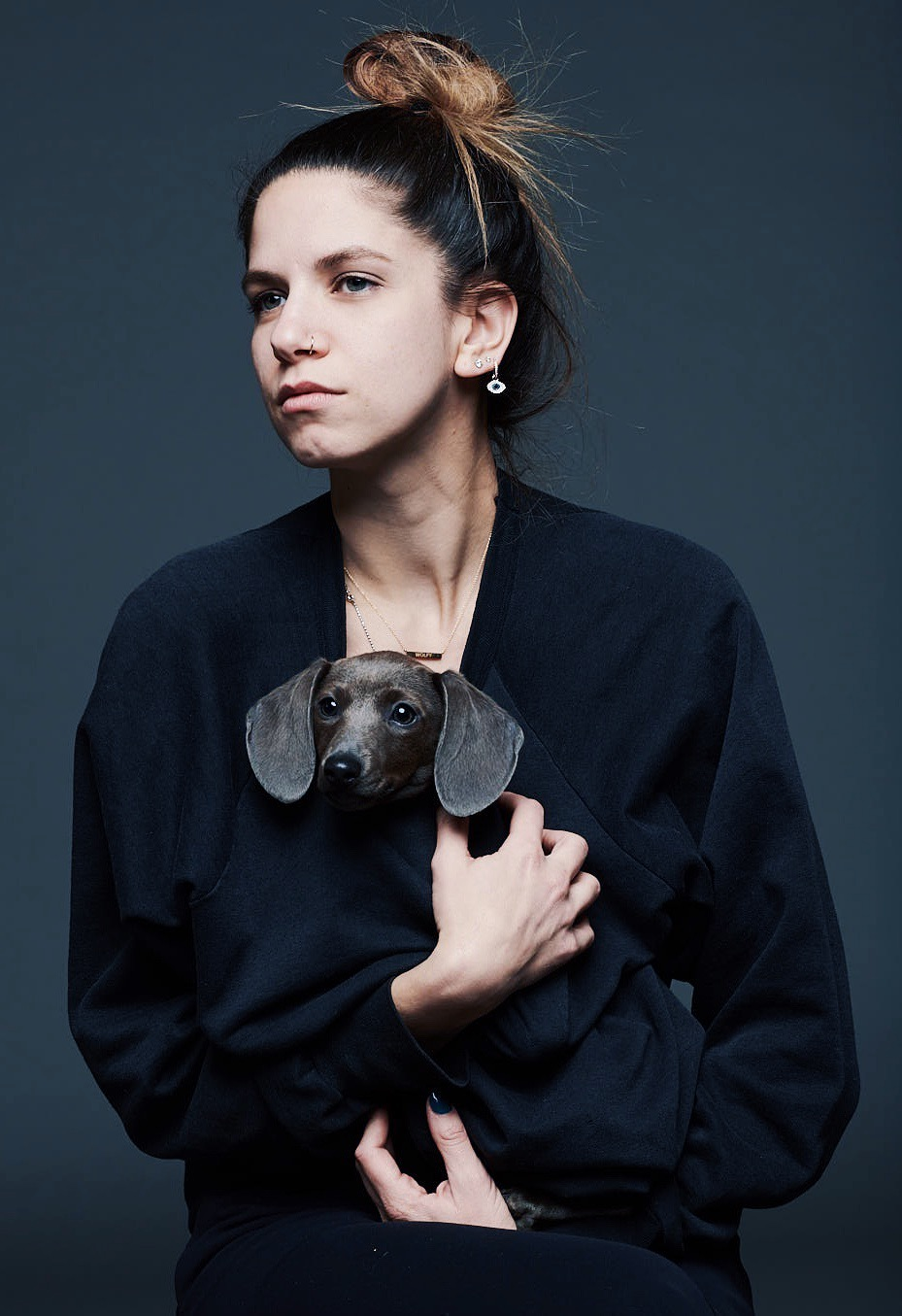
- Cronenberg in December 2018
- Born: October 27, 1984 (age 42); Toronto, Ontario, Canada
- Occupations: Photographer; filmmaker
- Father: David Cronenberg
- Relatives: Brandon Cronenberg (brother); Denise Cronenberg (aunt); Aaron Woodley (cousin)

Caitlin Cronenberg (born October 27, 1984) is a Canadian photographer and filmmaker, known for her celebrity portraits and editorials. She is David Cronenberg's daughter and Brandon Cronenberg's sister.

== Early life ==
Cronenberg was born in Toronto, the daughter of filmmakers David Cronenberg and Carolyn Zeifman, and the sister of director Brandon Cronenberg. She also has a half sister, Cassandra Cronenberg (b. 1972), from her father's first marriage (to Margaret Hindson, 1970–77). She received a degree in fashion design at Ryerson University (now Toronto Metropolitan University) before beginning her career as a photographer.

== Career ==
Her work has appeared in magazines and newspapers around the world, including the covers of W, L'Uomo Vogue, and Variety.

In 2010, Cronenberg self-published a book of nude portraits called POSER. In addition to still photography, Cronenberg has directed several music videos, including "I Got You" by Hollerado and "On Camera" by Hill.

She is best known for shooting the cover and booklet for Canadian rapper Drake's Views album, which became a viral sensation online in 2016.

In 2017, Cronenberg was hired by Apple Inc to shoot portraits of Canadians across the country for the first ever "Shot on iPhone" campaign created specifically for Canada. That same year, Cronenberg photographed the prime minister of Canada Justin Trudeau for the cover of Delta Sky Magazine. The same year, Cronenberg was the 2017 recipient of the Canadian Arts and Fashion Awards (CAFA) for "Image Maker of the Year". Her second book, The Endings, released in 2018.

In 2021, Cronenberg shot The Death of David Cronenberg, a one-minute short film starring her father as the titular character himself and also the writer. The short was offered as an NFT at SuperRare for auction. It was subsequently released on September 19, 2021. She was a guest judge and served as a photographer in the mini challenge on the second season of Canada's Drag Race in the episode "Lost and Fierce".

On December 10, 2021, she was announced as the director of the dystopian thriller Humane, which was released in 2024. It has a 70% fresh rating on Rotten Tomatoes from 61 reviews.

In 2025, Cronenberg photographed promotional posters for the Crave sports romance series Heated Rivalry.

Cronenberg is an interviewee and an executive producer for the documentary The Tower That Built a City, which was released in 2026.
