= The Wake of Calum MacLeod =

2006 Canadian short film

- Scottish Gaelic: Faire Chaluim Mhic Leòid
- Directed by: Marc Almon
- Produced by: Nona MacDermid
- Starring: Angus MacLeod; Logan MacLellan; Zachary MacMillan; Alex Sheppard; Donovan MacNeill; Keith Morrison
- Music by: Mary Jane Lamond
- Production company: Atlantic Filmmakers Cooperative
- Release date: 2006
- Running time: 6 minutes
- Country: Canada
- Language: Scottish Gaelic

The Wake of Calum MacLeod (Scottish Gaelic: Faire Chaluim Mhic Leòid) is a Canadian drama short film, directed by Marc Almon and released in 2006. The first film ever made in the Canadian dialect of the Scottish Gaelic language, the film stars Angus MacLeod as the titular Calum MacLeod, a father in Cape Breton who is at risk of losing his family because his insistence on the traditional ways conflicts with their preference for fitting into the modern world.

The film received a Genie Award nomination for Best Live Action Short Drama at the 28th Genie Awards. It later won the A&E Short Filmmakers Award at the National Screen Institute's Online Short Film Festival.
