= The Intestine =

- Film poster
- Directed by: Lev Lewis
- Written by: Lev Lewis
- Produced by: Yonah Lewis; Calvin Thomas
- Starring: Melanie Scheiner; Claudia Dey; Deragh Campbell
- Cinematography: Nikolay Michaylov
- Music by: Lev Lewis
- Release date: October 3, 2016 (VIFF)
- Running time: 71 minutes
- Country: Canada
- Language: English

The Intestine is a 2016 Canadian independent film written and directed by Lev Lewis. It stars Melanie Scheiner as a young woman attempting to better her life by appropriating a rich man's home.

The film premiered at the Vancouver International Film Festival on October 3, 2016 and had its international premiere at the Buenos Aires International Festival of Independent Cinema on April 21, 2017.

== Plot ==
Penniless and unhappy, Maya is growing increasingly fed up with her tedious job, unexciting friends, rundown apartment and the never-ending burden of caring for her drug-addict mother. Late one night she meets a wealthy man, Philip, and wakes up the next morning alone in his upscale suburban home. With Philip nowhere to be found, she attempts to discard her old life and take possession of his empty house. Maya befriends a neighbour and tries to settle in, when she receives a phone call from the hospital informing her of her mother's overdose death. Unable to fully process the news, she hangs up on the doctor.

Maya's attempt at relocation is hampered by the late-night arrival of Philip's sister, Meagan, who is searching for her vanished brother. Meagan comes to believe that Maya is responsible for his disappearance and chases her out of the house. Unwilling to return to her old life, Maya begins to formulate a plan to take back the property she feels is now rightly hers. Sneaking back into the house, Maya witnesses Meagan in the throes of an extramarital affair. Using a friend's car, Maya tracks Meagan and her lover to a lake-side cottage, where she confronts them and offers to keep their liaison secret in exchange for access to Philip's house. Meagan concedes.

Time passes and Maya makes the house her home. The morning after a small party she has thrown at the house, Maya calls the hospital, hoping for more information on her mother's death, but the doctor is unable to properly hear or understand Maya's words.

== Cast ==
- Melanie Scheiner as Maya
- Claudia Dey as Meagan
- Jennifer Hardy CK as Rachel
- Deragh Campbell as Patricia
- Drew Nelles as Philip
- Tuval Dinner as Victor
- Brian Robertson as Ben
- Terry Jansen as George
- Christine Pountney as Yelizaveta

== Production ==
=== Kickstarter campaign ===
On April 2, 2015 a Kickstarter campaign was launched with a fundraising target of $6,000 under the working title Sublet. On May 1, 2015 funding closed with $6,550 pledged by 72 backers.

=== Filming ===
Principal photography began in Toronto on June 2, 2015.

=== Music ===
The original score was written by the film's director Lev Lewis. The film features the song "Antabus" by the Swedish post-punk band Makthaverskan.
