= Wet Bum =

- Film poster
- Directed by: Lindsay MacKay
- Written by: Lindsay MacKay
- Produced by: Paula Devonshire; Lauren Grant
- Starring: Julia Sarah Stone; Leah Pinsent; Kenneth Welsh
- Cinematography: Guy Godfree
- Edited by: Jorge Weisz
- Music by: Ohad Benchetrit; Brendan Canning
- Production companies: Clique Pictures; Devonshire Productions; BUCK Productions
- Distributed by: Search Engine Films
- Release date: September 7, 2014 (TIFF)
- Running time: 98 minutes
- Country: Canada
- Language: English

Wet Bum (retitled Surfacing in some international markets) is a 2014 Canadian drama film, directed by Lindsay MacKay. The film stars Julia Sarah Stone as Sam, a shy and self-conscious teenage girl struggling to assert herself with those around her, including her older swimming teammates who make fun of her because she has not yet fully developed into womanhood and the residents of a nursing home where she has a part-time job as a cleaner.

The film's cast also includes Leah Pinsent as Sam's mother Mary Ellen, Jamie Johnston as her older brother Nate, Craig Arnold as her swimming coach Lukas, and Kenneth Welsh as Ed, a crotchety resident of the nursing home.

The film premiered at the 2014 Toronto International Film Festival.

The film received two Vancouver Film Critics Circle awards at the Vancouver Film Critics Circle Awards 2015, for Best Actress in a Canadian Film (Stone) and Best First Film by a Canadian Director. The film's visual effects team (Ian Britton, Robert Crowther, Steve Elliott, Oleksiy Golovchenko, Matt Philip, Jiang Shuming, Jay Stanners, Rob Tasker, Perunika Yorgova and Lexi Young) received a Canadian Screen Award nomination for Best Visual Effects at the 3rd Canadian Screen Awards.
