= Karen Harnisch =

Canadian film and television producer

Karen Harnisch is a Canadian film and television producer, who is a partner with Andrew Cividino in the production company Film Forge.

She has been a three-time Canadian Screen Award nominee as producer of the Best Picture contenders Sleeping Giant at the 4th Canadian Screen Awards in 2016, White Lie at the 8th Canadian Screen Awards in 2020, and Infinity Pool at the 12th Canadian Screen Awards in 2024.

== Filmography ==
=== Film ===
- Harvest - 2009
- Ivadelle - 2009
- Paper Princes, Gypsies and the Boy with No Return Address - 2009
- Ravine - 2009
- Bunked! - 2010
- We Ate the Children Last - 2011
- Yellow Fish - 2012
- The Oxbow Cure - 2013
- The One That Stares Back - 2013
- Rough Trade - 2014
- An Apartment - 2014
- Sleeping Giant - 2015
- Diamond Day - 2015
- Dust - 2017
- Fail to Appear - 2017
- A Translator - 2018
- M/M - 2018
- Arlo Alone - 2018
- Please Speak Continuously and Describe Your Experiences as They Come to You - 2019
- White Lie - 2019
- Jump, Darling - 2020
- 13 Minutes - 2021
- Firestarter - 2022
- Infinity Pool - 2023
- Home Bodies - 2026

=== Television ===
- Helltown - 2017
- Essex County - 2023
- Slip - 2023
