= Yonah Lewis =

Canadian film director

- Born: March 2, 1986 (age 40); Montreal, Quebec, Canada
- Occupations: Film director, producer, screenwriter
- Years active: 2011–present
- Known for: White Lie
- Website: lisapictures.com

Yonah Lewis (born March 2, 1986) is a Canadian film director and screenwriter, who collaborates on most of his work with Calvin Thomas. The duo are most noted for their 2019 film White Lie, which was a Canadian Screen Award nominee for Best Motion Picture, and garnered the duo nominations for Best Director and Best Original Screenplay, at the 8th Canadian Screen Awards.

The duo, both alumni of Sheridan College, released their debut feature film Amy George in 2011. They followed up with The Oxbow Cure in 2013, and Spice It Up in 2018, before releasing White Lie. In addition to their Canadian Screen Award nominations, the duo also won the Vancouver Film Critics Circle award for Best Screenplay for a Canadian Film in 2019.

== Filmography ==
Year	Film	Type	Director	Writer	Producer	Notes
2011	Amy George	Feature film	Yes	Yes	Yes	Directorial debut
2013	The Oxbow Cure	Feature film	Yes	Yes	Yes	
2016	The Intestine	Feature film	No	No	Yes	Directed by Lev Lewis
2018	Spice It Up	Feature film	Yes	Yes	Yes	
2019	White Lie	Feature film	Yes	Yes	Yes	
2020	Every Day's Like This	Short film	No	No	Yes	Directed by Lev Lewis
