= Nick Serino =

Canadian actor

Nicholas Jonathan Roger Serino (born October 11, 1997), known professionally as Nick Serino, is a Canadian actor.

== Early life ==
Serino was born in Thunder Bay, Ontario and attended Superior Collegiate and Vocational Institute.

== Career ==
Serino won the Canadian Screen Award for Best Supporting Actor at the 4th Canadian Screen Awards in 2016, for his role in the film Sleeping Giant. He appears in the film as Nate, one of three teenagers spending the summer together near Thunder Bay, Ontario; his character's cousin Riley is played by Serino's real-life cousin Reece Moffett. He was also awarded the Vancouver Film Critics Circle award for Best Supporting Actor in a Canadian film.

Following Sleeping Giant, Serino was cast as a recurring character in the crime drama television series Cardinal.

In 2019 he appeared in the film Restless River (La rivière sans repos).
