= Withrow Park =

Park in Toronto

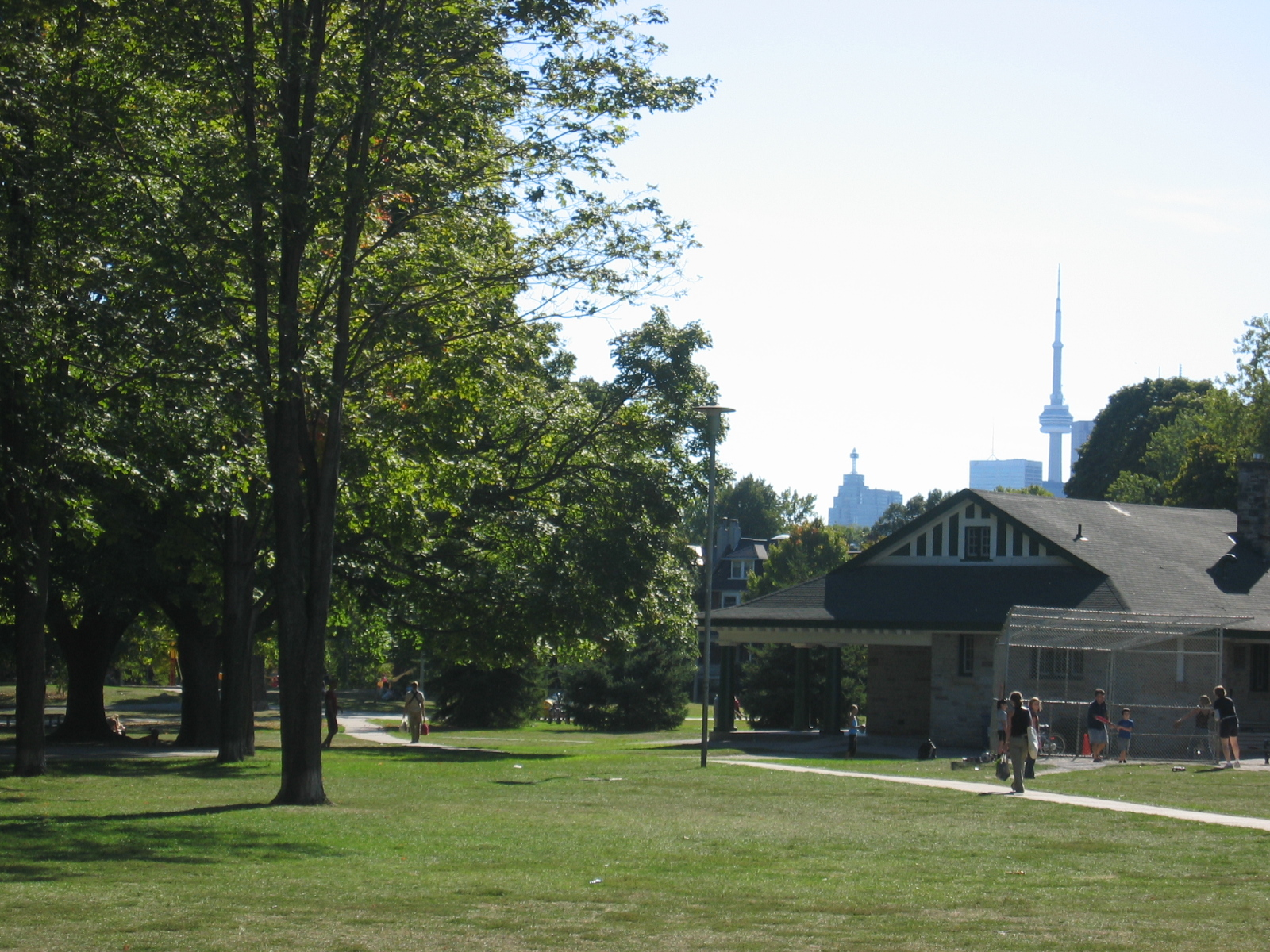
- Interactive map of Withrow Park
- Type: Public Park
- Location: 725 Logan Avenue; Toronto, Ontario
- Coordinates: 43°40′29″N 79°20′50″W
- Area: 8.5 hectares (21 acres)
- Created: 1910
- Operator: Toronto Parks and Recreation Division
- Website: www.toronto.ca/explore-enjoy/parks-recreation/places-spaces/parks-and-recreation-facilities/location/?id=306

Withrow Park is a 8.5-hectare (21-acre) park in the Riverdale neighbourhood of Toronto, Ontario, Canada. Laid out and constructed in the 1910s, at the same time that the surrounding community was built, Withrow Park is among Toronto's large multi-purpose parks. The park is bounded by Carlaw Avenue on the east, Bain Avenue on the south, Logan Avenue on the west and McConnell Avenue on the north.

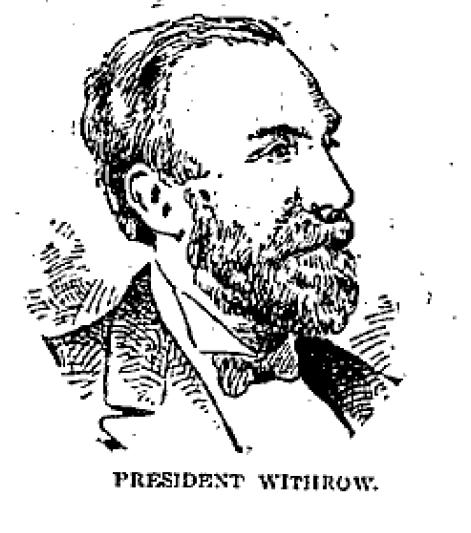
1894 portrait of John Jacob Withrow

Withrow Park is named after John Jacob Withrow (1833–1900), a local landowner and builder, who also served as a city alderman and was one of the founders of what would become the Canadian National Exhibition.

The park gained nationwide notoriety in 2004 when hot dogs laced with carbofuran were left in the park, killing one dog and poisoning 15 others. While the poisonings were under criminal investigation, the City closed most of Withrow Park by surrounding it with a chain-link fence, causing controversy in the neighbourhood. No charges were ever laid.

In February 2008, the Toronto Maple Leafs ice hockey team held a practice in Withrow Park, to mark the recent refurbishment of the park's ice rink and related facilities.

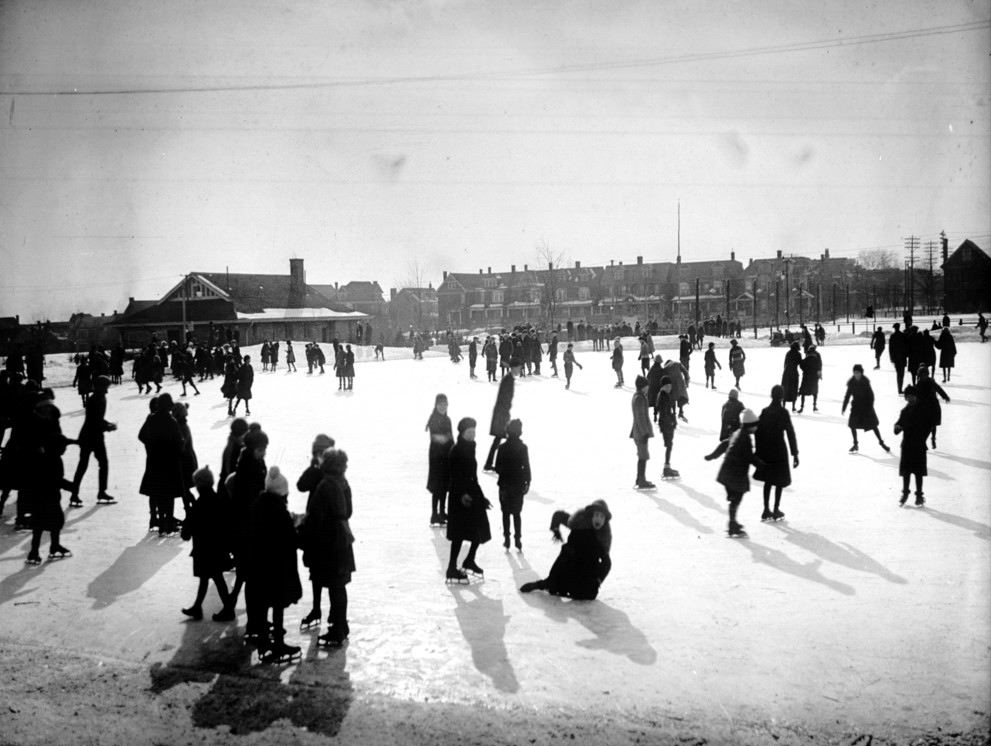
Ice skating in Withrow Park, 1923.
