= Brandon Cronenberg =

Canadian filmmaker

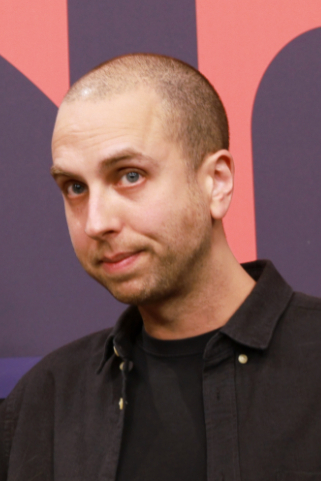
- Cronenberg in 2023
- Born: Brandon Cronenberg; January 10, 1980 (age 46); Toronto, Ontario, Canada
- Education: Toronto Metropolitan University
- Occupations: Director; screenwriter; producer
- Years active: 2008–present
- Father: David Cronenberg
- Relatives: Caitlin Cronenberg (sister); Denise Cronenberg (aunt); Aaron Woodley (cousin)

Brandon Cronenberg (born January 10, 1980) is a Canadian director, producer and screenwriter. He is the son of filmmaker David Cronenberg and the brother of Caitlin Cronenberg. His works include the science fiction horror films Antiviral (2012), Possessor (2020), and Infinity Pool (2023). He has won several accolades for his work.

== Early life ==
Cronenberg was born in Toronto, the son of filmmakers David Cronenberg and Carolyn Zeifman, and the brother of photographer Caitlin Cronenberg. He also has a half sister, Cassandra, from his father's first marriage. Cronenberg studied film at Toronto Metropolitan University in Toronto, Canada. He initially considered himself to be a "book nerd" growing up, who was interested in becoming a writer, painter, or musician. He came to realize that film contained all those elements and attended film school.

== Career ==
=== Antiviral ===
In 2008, Cronenberg directed a short film titled Broken Tulips, about people who pay to be injected with viruses that were harvested from celebrities. Cronenberg has stated that the genesis of the film was a viral infection he once had. More precisely, the "central idea came to him in a fever dream during a bout of illness," wrote journalist Jill Lawless. It was further shaped when he saw an interview Sarah Michelle Gellar did on Jimmy Kimmel Live!; what struck him was when "she said she was sick and if she sneezed she'd infect the whole audience, and everyone just started cheering."

The short was adapted from a script he was working on for his first feature, Antiviral. Principal photography for the feature film adaptation took place in Hamilton, Ontario and in Toronto.

Antiviral debuted at the 2012 Cannes Film Festival in the Un Certain Regard section. Cronenberg and his father both screened films at that year's Cannes Film Festival, marking the first time a father and son screened films together in the festival's history.

Cronenberg re-edited the movie after the festival to make it tighter, trimming nearly six minutes from its running time. The revised version was first shown at the 2012 Toronto International Film Festival, where it tied for the award for Best Canadian First Feature Film. It later won the Citizen Kane Award for Best Debut Feature at the Sitges Film Festival.

=== Please Speak Continuously... and Possessor ===
In 2019, Cronenberg's short film Please Speak Continuously and Describe Your Experiences as They Come to You, starring Deragh Campbell, premiered at the Cannes Film Festival in the Critics' Week section. The film won the Canal+ Grand Prize at L'Étrange Festival in Paris, and in December 2019 was included in TIFF's annual year-end Canada's Top Ten list for short films.

Cronenberg stated that visuals for Please Speak Continuously and Describe Your Experiences as They Come to You came from experiments he and his cinematographer Karim Hussain were doing for a feature film he was making called Possessor.

Possessor was released the following year, starring Christopher Abbott, Andrea Riseborough, Jennifer Jason Leigh, Tuppence Middleton and Sean Bean. It premiered at the 2020 Sundance Film Festival in the World Cinema Dramatic Competition section, where US distribution rights were picked up by Neon. The film won awards for Best Feature Length Film and Best Direction at the Sitges Film Festival that year, as well as the Grand Prize at the 2021 Gérardmer Film Festival. The film also received three nominations at the inaugural Critics' Choice Super Awards in the Science Fiction/Fantasy category, for Best Movie, Best Actor, and Best Actress. It was named to the Toronto International Film Festival's year-end Canada's Top Ten list for feature films.

=== Infinity Pool ===
At the 2019 Cannes Film Festival it was announced that Cronenberg's third feature would be a film called Infinity Pool, based on an original script of his.

Infinity Pool stars Alexander Skarsgård and Mia Goth. It had its world premiere at the 2023 Sundance Film Festival, and European premiere at the Berlin International Film Festival the same year.

Neon distributed the film in the US, with Focus Features taking international rights. It was nominated for eleven Canadian Screen Awards.

=== Upcoming work ===
In 2021 it was announced that Cronenberg would write and direct an adaptation of the J. G. Ballard novel Super-Cannes as a limited series for television.

In 2024 he worked with Sam Barlow and Half Mermaid on a sci-fi horror FMV videogame code named Project C, published by Blumhouse Games.

In 2025 it was announced that Cronenberg had secured financing for a sci-fi epic feature film titled Dragon.

== Filmography ==
Short film

- Broken Tulips (2008)
- The Camera and Christopher Merk (2010)
- Please Speak Continuously and Describe Your Experiences as They Come to You (2019)

Feature film

Year	Title	Director	Writer	Executive producer
2012	Antiviral	Yes	Yes	No
2020	Possessor	Yes	Yes	No
2023	Infinity Pool	Yes	Yes	Yes
