= Sleeping Giant (film) =

2015 film

- Theatrical release poster
- Directed by: Andrew Cividino
- Written by: Andrew Cividino
- Produced by: Karen Harnisch; Marc Swenker; James Vandewater; Aaron Yeger; Andrew Cividino
- Starring: Jackson Martin; Reece Moffett; Nick Serino
- Cinematography: James Klopko
- Edited by: James Vandewater
- Music by: Chris Thornborrow
- Production companies: Film Forge Productions; Hawkeye Pictures
- Distributed by: D Films
- Release date: May 14, 2015 (Cannes)
- Running time: 89 minutes
- Country: Canada
- Language: English

Sleeping Giant is a 2015 Canadian drama film written and directed by Andrew Cividino. The film follows three teenage boys coping with boredom in cottage country on the shores of Lake Superior.

The film premiered in the Critics' Week section at the 2015 Cannes Film Festival. It is an expansion of a short film that Cividino made in 2013, which was nominated for Best Live Action Short Drama at the 3rd Canadian Screen Awards. The film is named after the Sleeping Giant cliffs near Thunder Bay.

== Plot ==
Teenage Adam Hudson is spending his summer vacation with his upper middle-class parents in Thunder Bay on rugged Lake Superior. His dull routine is given a jumpstart when he befriends Riley and Nate, working-class cousins staying with their grandmother, who pass their ample free time with debauchery and reckless cliff jumping. Sporadically joined by Adam's friend Taylor, the three boys become inseparable, but their friendship is uneasy and rife with hormonal tension, bullying and jealousy.

Riley witnesses Adam's father engaging an extramarital affair with a local shopkeeper and tells Adam, who begins to act out in his father's company and engage in increasingly dangerous mischief with his friends. The revelation of his father's infidelity triggers a series of irreversible events that test the bonds of friendship and change the boys forever.

== Cast ==
- Jackson Martin as Adam Hudson
- Nick Serino as Nate
- Reece Moffett as Riley
- Katelyn McKerracher as Taylor
- Rita Serino as Grandma
- Erika Brodzky as Marianne
- David Disher as William Hudson
- Taylor Facca as Shanna
- Lorraine Philp as Linda Hudson
- Kyle Bertrand as Brad

== Influences ==
Cividino has listed numerous films and filmmakers as influences for Sleeping Giant, including Peter Weir's Picnic At Hanging Rock, Mike Nichols' The Graduate, and Andrea Arnold's Fish Tank.

== Release ==
=== Critical reception ===
On review aggregation website Rotten Tomatoes, the film holds an approval rating of 87% based on 23 reviews, and an average rating of 7.5/10. On Metacritic, the film has a weighted average score of 71 out of 100, based on 5 critics, indicating "generally favorable reviews".

Variety's Guy Lodge called the film an "accomplished debut," adding, "Cividino depicts the tricky male power games between the boys with tact and compassionate impartiality." Jessica Kiang for The Playlist wrote "Perhaps most impressive is how, despite the nostalgia inherent in this kind of endeavor, Sleeping Giant never sentimentalizes its story, and never compromises on the essentially bleak idea that you can be transformed from a carefree child shading your eyes from the glare of a huge, wide future to a scarred and haunted young adult in a single moment."

=== Accolades ===
Sleeping Giant won Best Canadian First Feature Film at the 2015 Toronto International Film Festival. It also took home the Best Canadian Film award at the Vancouver International Film Festival. In December 2015, the Toronto International Film Festival named the film to its annual year-end Canada's Top Ten list.

Award	Date of ceremony	Category	Recipient(s) and nominee(s)	Result	Ref(s)
Toronto Film Critics Association	December 14, 2015	Rogers Best Canadian Film Award	Andrew Cividino	Nominated	
Canadian Screen Awards	March 13, 2016	Best Motion Picture	Karen Harnisch, Andrew Cividino, Marc Swenker, James Vandewater, Aaron Yeger	Nominated	
Canadian Screen Awards	March 13, 2016	Best Director	Andrew Cividino	Nominated	
Canadian Screen Awards	March 13, 2016	Best Supporting Actor	Nick Serino	Won	
Canadian Screen Awards	March 13, 2016	Best Editing	James Vandewater	Nominated	
