= Andrew Cividino =

Canadian film director and screenwriter

- Born: Hamilton, Ontario, Canada
- Occupation: Filmmaker
- Years active: 2007–present
- Known for: Sleeping Giant, Schitt's Creek

Andrew Cividino (born 1983) is a Canadian film director and screenwriter. He is best known for his feature film directorial debut Sleeping Giant, which premiered at the 2015 Cannes Film Festival, and for his frequent work as a director on the Emmy winning comedy Schitt's Creek, for which he won a Primetime Emmy at the 72nd Primetime Emmy Awards.

He is a partner with Karen Harnisch in the production company Film Forge.

== Early life ==
Originally from Dundas, Ontario, Cividino frequently spent childhood summers in the Sibley Peninsula region near Thunder Bay.

== Career ==
After studying film at Ryerson University, Cividino made several short films, including Norbert (2007), We Ate the Children Last (2011) and Yellow Fish (2012). In 2006, he won the Ontario Film Review Board's student film competition.

In 2011, Telefilm included him on its annual Talent to Watch panel, and his short We Ate the Children Last made TIFF's Top 10 Shorts list.

=== Sleeping Giant ===
When all of the funding fell through for his feature film directorial debut, Sleeping Giant, Cividino proceeded with a pared down short film version, which was released in 2014. The short went on to win an award at the Locarno International Film Festival, and received a Canadian Screen Award nomination for Best Live Action Short Drama at the 3rd Canadian Screen Awards, in turn enabling Cividino to secure new funding.

The feature version of Sleeping Giant premiered at the Cannes Film Festival in 2015. It later screened at the Munich Film Festival, where it won the CineVision Award for Best Film By An Emerging Director, and at the 2015 Toronto International Film Festival, where it won the award for Best Canadian First Feature Film. At the 2015 Vancouver International Film Festival, Sleeping Giant won the juried Best Canadian Film Award.

At the 4th Canadian Screen Awards in 2016, Cividino was a nominee for Best Director for Sleeping Giant, which also garnered three other nominations including Best Picture, though it did not win; Cividino lost the Best Director award to Lenny Abrahamson for Room.

=== Schitt's Creek ===
In 2017 Cividino directed an episode of Schitt's Creek titled "Merry Christmas, Johnny Rose", alongside co-director Dan Levy. The following year he co-directed the season finale "Life is a Cabaret" with Levy. In the show's final season, Cividino directed seven episodes of the show, including the series finale "Happy Ending", which he co-directed with Levy, and for which they won a Primetime Emmy. The show received a total of 15 Emmy nominations in its final season, including for Outstanding Comedy Series.

=== Awards and recognition ===
In 2016, the Toronto International Film Festival announced they had selected Cividino as their annual Len Blum resident, where he will develop his short film We Ate the Children Last into a feature film.

Cividino has since participated in Berlinale Talents and was selected as one of eleven filmmakers to participate in the prestigious Sundance Institute's FilmTwo Program. He is a recurring director on Schitt's Creek, and was nominated for a Canadian Screen Award for Best Direction in a Comedy Series for the Christmas special "Merry Christmas, Johnny Rose" alongside co-director Dan Levy.

In July 2020, Cividino and co-director Dan Levy were nominated for achievement in direction at the 72nd Primetime Emmy Awards, and won at the ceremony that took place on September 20, 2020.
