= Asteris Gkekas =

Greek artist (born 1954)

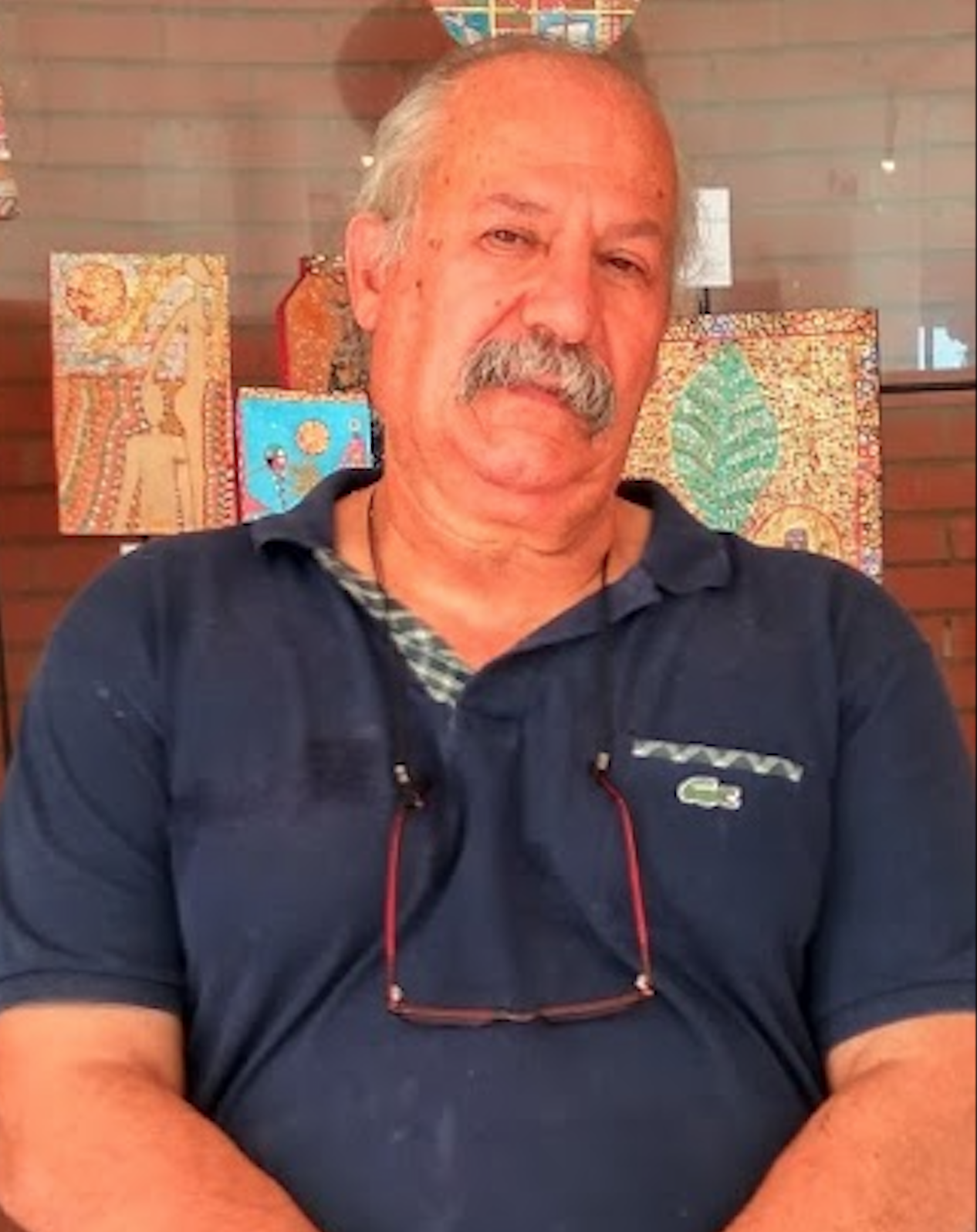
Gkekas during his "Palimpsests" exhibition at the Archaeological Park of Dion, Greece, in 2019.

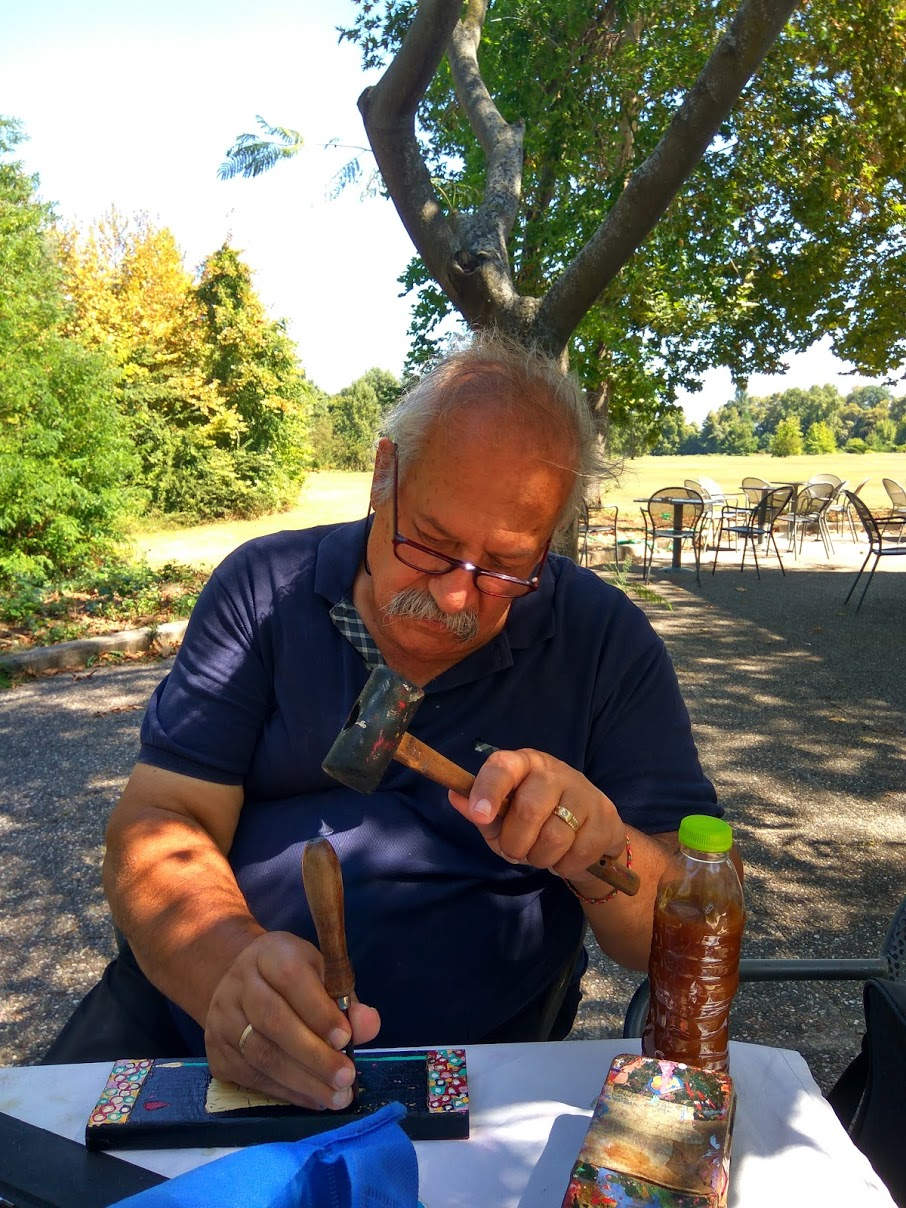
Gkekas in 2019

Asteris Gkekas (Greek: Αστέρης Γκέκας) (born 18 November 1954) is a modern Greek artist from Thessaloniki, Greece.

== Career ==
Gkekas earned a degree in physical education from the National and Kapodistrian University of Athens, but after graduation began studying art under Nikos Michelidakis, a Greek sculptor. Following this training, he founded the workshop Dimitris Galanis in 1985. Inspired by Greek folk culture and an interest in poetry, Gkekas has been recognised as having “created his own visual language”. He has worked in the fields of sculpture, wood engraving, and pointillism painting.

=== Exhibitions ===
Gkekas' artwork has been exhibited both nationally and internationally. Venues where his works have been displayed include the University of Geneva, the University of Thessaly, the Bissell Library at the American College of Thessaloniki, Metaixmio Publications, The Office gallery in Nicosia, the American College of Greece, the Bathhouse of the Winds Museum in Athens, the Theorema Art Gallery in Brussels, Bootschaft Gallery in Düsseldorf, the Archaeological Museum of Dion, ARTos Cultural and Research Foundation in Nicosia, and the Giorgio de Chirico Art Centre in Volos.

=== Gallery ===
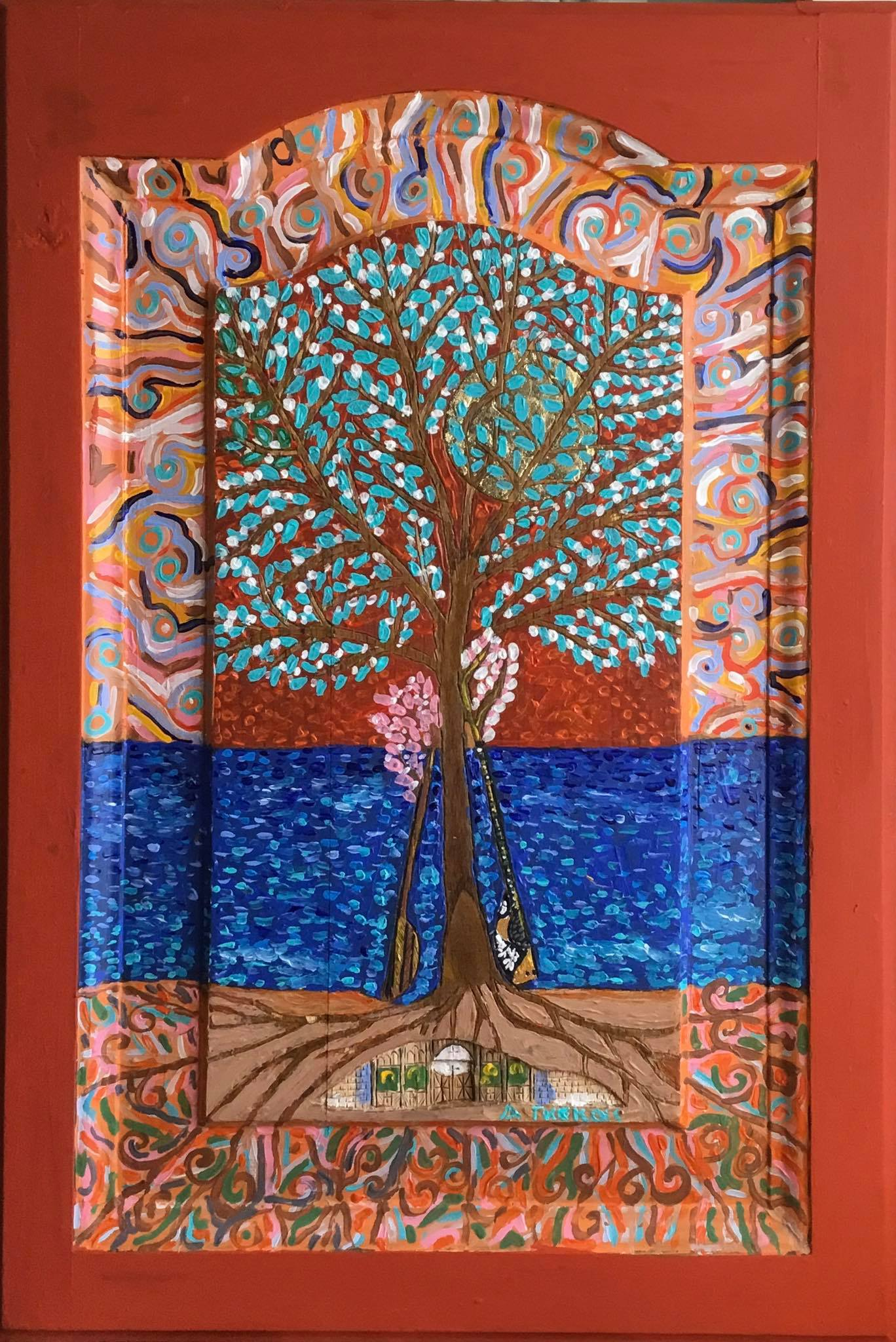
Easter

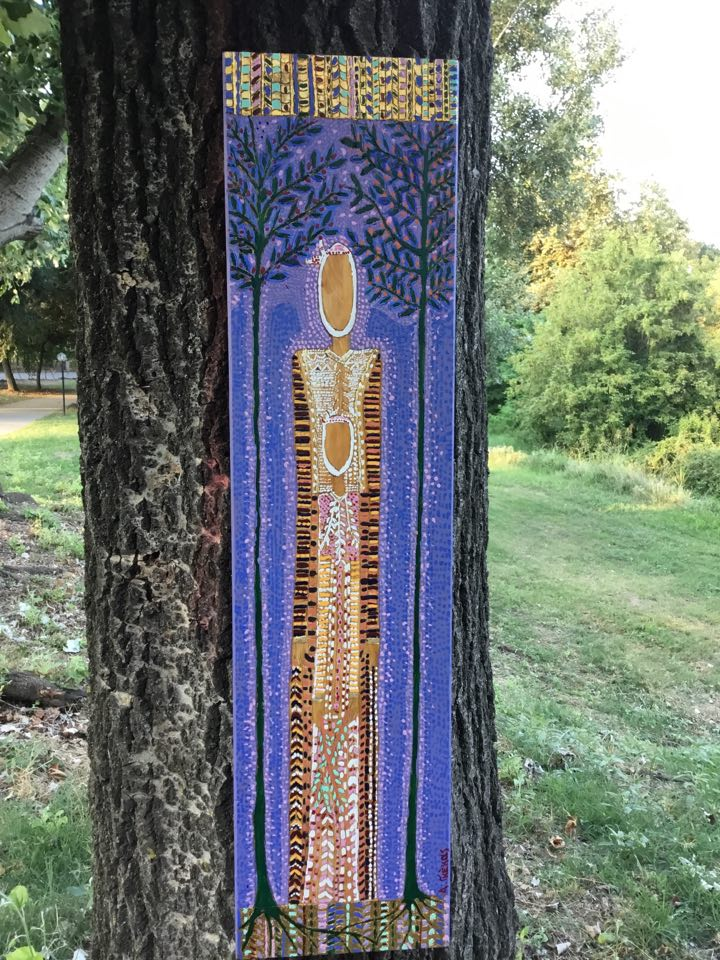
Motherhood
