= Chapter Three: The Turnbow Trap =

- Stranger Things episode
- Promotional poster by Butcher Billy
- Episode no.: Season 5 Episode 3
- Directed by: Frank Darabont
- Written by: Caitlin Schneiderhan
- Cinematography by: Brett Jutkiewicz
- Editing by: Casey Cichocki; Dean Zimmerman
- Original air date: November 26, 2025
- Running time: 69 minutes

Guest appearances
- Caroline Elle Abrams as Tina Turnbow; Sherman Augustus as Sullivan; Alex Breaux as Robert Akers; Jake Connelly as Derek Turnbow; Randy Havens as Scott Clarke; Nell Fisher as Holly Wheeler; Hope Hynes Love as Miss Harris; Amybeth McNulty as Vickie Dunne

Episode chronology
← Previous "Chapter Two: The Vanishing of Holly Wheeler"	Next → "Chapter Four: Sorcerer"
- Stranger Things season 5

"Chapter Three: The Turnbow Trap" is the third episode of the fifth season of the American science fiction horror drama television series Stranger Things. The 37th episode overall, the episode was written by Caitlin Schneiderhan and directed by Frank Darabont. It was released on November 26, 2025, on Netflix as part of volume one of season five.

In this episode, having gained insight into Vecna's plans through Will's connection to the Demogorgon hive mind, the group prepares to set a trap to locate Holly. In the Upside Down, Hopper and Eleven search for information to determine their next move. Meanwhile, Holly explores her new surroundings.

The episode was met with positive reviews from critics, who praised Darabont's direction and the performances of Winona Ryder, Priah Ferguson, Caroline Abrams, and Jake Connelly.

== Plot ==
In the Upside Down, Eleven and Hopper are unable to break through the mysterious wall blocking their path. Eleven is then debilitated by a sonic device deployed by an approaching military truck, but the pair are able to overcome the soldiers and take Lieutenant Akers hostage. Eleven uses her powers to interrogate him for information, sees Dr. Kay enter a secure vault in her laboratory, and concludes that she is hiding Vecna there. Meanwhile, Lt. Colonel Sullivan begins a search for Akers.

Joyce confronts Will and Robin for sneaking out without telling her, but Will insists that it was his idea, and reveals that he has discovered he can see through Vecna's eyes and has uncovered his plan to kidnap more children. He states that Holly's classmate, Derek Turnbow, appeared in his vision, and that the group should set a trap for Vecna, knowing that Derek is likely his next target. The trio regroups with the others and forms a plan to drug Derek and his family, remove them from the home, and shoot the Demogorgon that comes for Derek with a tracker, which will help them locate Holly, Hopper, and Eleven in the Upside Down. While searching for drugs at the hospital, Will asks Robin how she first knew Vickie liked her, and Robin shares several anecdotes about their relationship, and subtly reassures Will about his own sexuality.

Murray smuggles in supplies for the trap, while Nancy prepares the tracker. Jonathan later reveals to Murray that he is planning to propose to Nancy. Realising they will need someone that the Turnbows trust, Lucas is able to convince a reluctant Erica to help them. Erica brings a drugged pie, and the entire family is subsequently knocked unconscious, with the exception of her former best friend Tina, who refuses to eat any of it. Erica is forced to inject Tina directly, and then helps Joyce, Will, and Robin load the Turnbows into a van. They blindfold Derek to trick Vecna into thinking he is sleeping, and to prevent him from seeing through their trap and taking the family to a barn. Finally accepting that her overbearing attempts to protect him from danger are futile and that risks need to be taken to stop Vecna, Joyce reconciles with Will and expresses her guilt at allowing him to be taken in the first place. Remaining at the house, Mike, Lucas, Dustin, Steve, Nancy, and Jonathan set various traps, and Nancy is able to successfully shoot the Demogorgon with the tracker before it attempts to retreat through a portal into the Upside Down. Dustin then realizes it has changed course. At the barn, Derek wakes up and removes his blindfold, leading Will to realize that Vecna knows where they are, and that a Demogorgon is coming straight for them.

At the Creel House, Vecna, in his human form as Henry Creel, tells Holly that more children will join them in time. He explains he will be gone for the day and gives her free rein of the house, on the condition that she promise not to go into the woods that surround it. When Henry leaves, Holly senses something watching her, and later finds a letter in the mailbox, supposedly from Henry, saying he needs her help and to meet him in the woods, along with a map and a compass. She follows the map to a cave, but flees when another figure emerges. It eventually catches up to her, revealing itself to be Max Mayfield.

== Production ==
On August 31, 2025, Ross Duffer posted to Instagram, confirming that "The Turnbow Trap", along with episode four "Sorcerer", were complete. Regarding the episode, he teased, "“The Turnbow Trap” is the most classic Stranger Things-y episode of the season. It’s got all our favorite things. Directed by one of our idols Frank Darabont (Shawshank! Green Mile! Walking Dead!) — who literally came out of retirement for this. He crushed it, obviously".

=== Writing ===
The episode was written by Caitlin Schneiderhan, marking her second writing credit on the show. Elaborating on Max Mayfield's appearance at the end of the episode, series creators The Duffer Brothers had informed Sadie Sink that she would "obviously return" in the fifth season before giving her the script of "Chapter Nine: The Piggyback", the fourth season finale, when they assumed she would read the script and think her character would be killed off. While they told her she would come back, they didn't tell her exactly how, merely giving her a hint, even though at that point Holly Wheeler wasn't yet a "really big part" of the fifth season's story, with the Duffers only knowing that Max would be trapped within Vecna's mind. Her story from there would evolve as the writers' room worked on it.

=== Filming ===
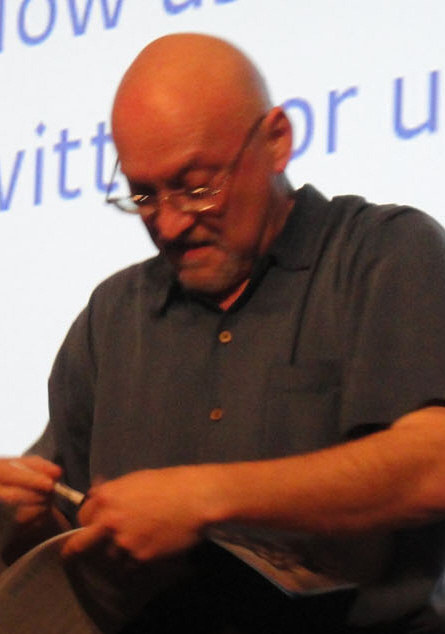
Frank Darabont came out of retirement to direct the episode.

The episode was directed by Frank Darabont, his first directing credit on the show. Darabont came out of retirement to work on the show, having last directed twelve years prior on the series Mob City (2013). He had met with the Duffer Brothers for lunch before production on the fifth season began and the trio expressed mutual appreciation for each others' work, leading the Duffers to call him and invite him to direct. Originally only scheduled to direct the fifth episode "Chapter Five: Shock Jock", Darabont agreed to also direct "Chapter Three: The Turnbow Trap" after Dan Trachtenberg had to drop out due to conflicts with Predator: Badlands (2025). Darabont stated that, though he has had several offers to direct since his retirement, he felt he compelled to agree to work on Stranger Things because he and his wife Sara Rae were such big fans of the show, having watched the first four seasons together multiple times.

Of filming the confrontation scene over the pie, which subsequently went viral on social media, Erica's actress Priah Ferguson declared it a "really fun scene to shoot", though added that it was difficult to play up the emotional elements, advising that "I had to think about Erica’s motive and prepare for it. Whenever it’s an emotional scene, I like to tap into what the character’s motive is so it comes off more natural, because it’s hard to just cry on the spot". She praised working with Darabont, expressing that "working with Frank and seeing how humble he is, how he affirms everyone on set and tells them that they’re doing a great job, even though you might already know you did a scene well — it’s just good to hear that from the top person". Also discussing the pie scene, Tina Turnbow's actress Caroline Elle Abrams stated, “I could not contain myself, The second they called ‘cut,’ I would just die laughing because everything Priah does is so iconic — the way she delivers it is so funny and spot on” and noted that she enjoyed seeing the various fan edits and Internet memes following the episode's release. She explained that they filmed the scene several times and described Darabont as "very hands-on" with her and the other young actors, advising her to play it "so seriously" and to "give me the best horror scream that you can do". The character of Tina, Erica Sinclair's on/off best friend, had been mentioned several times in previous episodes and Abrams stated that she had auditioned for Stranger Things three times before landing the role. Darabont stated of the pie scene, "I knew that was going to be one of those scenes where the tone swings for the fences a little bit" due to the contrasting horror, comedic and dramatic tones, but noted that he "just wanted the characters to be, given the material, as real as they could be" and advising that he had several "question sessions" with the Duffer Brothers to clarify what their vision was. He spoke positively of Abrams' performance in the scene, expressing that "she gave me the best 1980s horror movie scream. I was so delighted with her scream. I actually had to shorten it a little bit in the cut, she really stretched it out. But she really sold that moment, that beat for us". He also spoke of his enjoyment at working with Jamie Campbell Bower and exploring the character of Henry Creel / Vecna.

=== Music ===
The episode features "To Each His Own" by Freddy Martin & His Orchestra, "I Think We're Alone Now" by Tiffany, and "Oh Yeah" by Yello.

In the week following the debut of volume one, several of featured on the soundtrack experienced a massive surge in popularity. Billboard reported that "I Think We're Alone Now" saw an increase of 289%, to a total of 1.3 million streams. The song also debuted on the Official Streaming Chart in the UK at 99, and later re-entered the UK singles chart for the first time since April 1988, appearing at number 29.

== Release ==
"The Turnbow Trap" was released on November 26, 2025, on Netflix, alongside the three other episodes comprising Stranger Things season 5 volume 1.

== Reception ==
The episode received a positive reception from critics. Tara Bennett of IGN praised Darabont's directing, stating that "The legendary Frank Darabont (The Shawshank Redemption, The Mist) directs "Chapter Three: The Turnbow Trap,” which lets him rip with period-piece elements, Commando-style action sequences in the Upside Down featuring El and Hopper, and the establishing of Holly as the unexpected focus of Vecna’s attentions. He gets to showcase the quiet menace of Bower’s Henry persona and show his prowess in working with kids. He’s also gifted with framing an excellent reveal at the end of the episode that puts wind into the sails of the whole show heading into the climactic last episode". Writing for The A.V. Club, Saloni Gajjar enjoyed seeing the episode "embrace its goofy and gory leanings", and praised Winona Ryder's performance as Joyce, noting "I still think Stranger Things doesn’t utilize Ryder’s prowess, but Joyce’s heart-to-heart with her son proves why she’s the ensemble’s shining star. Give her more to do, damnit."
