= Chapter Four: Sorcerer =

- Stranger Things episode
- Promotional poster by Butcher Billy
- Episode no.: Season 5 Episode 4
- Directed by: The Duffer Brothers
- Written by: Paul Dichter
- Cinematography by: Caleb Heymann
- Editing by: Katheryn Naranjo; Dean Zimmerman
- Original air date: November 26, 2025
- Running time: 86 minutes

Guest appearances
- Sherman Augustus as Sullivan; Linnea Berthelsen as Kali / Eight; Emanuel Borria as Luis Ramirez; Alex Breaux as Robert Akers; Jake Connelly as Derek Turnbow; Nell Fisher as Holly Wheeler; Hope Hynes Love as Miss Harris; Aidan Armstrong as Danny Harrington

Episode chronology
← Previous "Chapter Three: The Turnbow Trap"	Next → "Chapter Five: Shock Jock"
- Stranger Things season 5

"Chapter Four: Sorcerer" is the fourth episode of the fifth season of the American science fiction horror drama television series Stranger Things. The 38th episode overall, the episode was directed by series creators The Duffer Brothers and written by Paul Dichter. It was released on November 26, 2025, on Netflix alongside the previous three episodes as the finale of season five's volume one.

Set in November 4 and 5, 1987, the episode features the military rounding up the local children, leading Joyce, Will, Mike, Lucas, and Robin to launch a daring plan in order to rescue them and protect them from Henry/Vecna. In the Upside Down, Eleven and Hopper seek to infiltrate the military lab and find out what Dr. Kay is hiding, while Max tells Holly about where she has been following her brief death.

The episode received critical acclaim, with praise aimed towards the directing and the performances (particularly Noah Schnapp, Sadie Sink, Maya Hawke, Jamie Campbell Bower, and Jake Connelly).

== Plot ==
Joyce, Will, Robin, and Erica attempt to convince a terrified Derek that they are trying to protect him and his family from monsters, though he insists that they are lying. He attempts to escape, but Will senses that a Demogorgon has found them. Joyce is able to hold it off long enough for Dustin, Steve, Nancy, and Jonathan to run over it with Steve's car. The Demogorgon flees into the Upside Down, and Steve's group follows it. Will sees a vision of Holly and three other children restrained by Henry, with eight additional empty spots. Under Dr. Kay's orders, the military begin collecting the Hawkins children and bringing them to the military base in a ploy to lure out Eleven. Will's group sends Derek to the base to identify which of the children have seen Henry, planning to evacuate them through secret tunnels and have Murray take them to safety before Henry comes for them. As the group moves through the tunnels, Mike suggests to Will that he may have more power over the Demogorgon hive mind than he realizes. Robin, seeing Will's feelings for Mike, tells Will that her romantic interest was interested in Steve, and that she learned to accept herself rather than rely on anyone else for validation.

In the Upside Down, Steve's car crashes into the mysterious wall. Eleven and Hopper scout the Upside Down military lab, planning to break in and discover what is hidden inside. They make contact with Steve's group, and Hopper tells them to stay put. Dustin learns that the wall forms a complete circle around the Upside Down, with Hawkins National Laboratory at its center. Eleven and Hopper infiltrate the lab, defeat Akers, and knocks Dr. Kay out before discovering that Kali Prasad / Eight is being held inside a vault.

Meanwhile, Max leads Holly to the cave where she has been hiding. Max explains that they are in a world made of Henry's memories. Max has been exploring the memories ever since her brief death, (Note: As depicted in the fourth season episode "Chapter Nine: The Piggyback" (2022)) trying to escape; she almost made it back to the real world after hearing Lucas play her favorite song at the hospital, but Henry found her. Fleeing to the cave, Max discovered that Henry is unable to follow and believes it to be associated with a memory too terrifying for him to face. Once she saw Holly at Henry's house, she realized the two of them had another chance to escape, and advises her to return to the house and play along with Henry's plan for now.

At the military base, the group extracts the children, but are discovered by Sullivan. Three children make it to Murray's truck with Robin; Lucas leads two others through the tunnels, while Joyce, Will, and Mike are arrested with Derek and two other children. Will collapses, sensing something racing towards them. Several Demogorgons and Henry in his Vecna form burst from the Upside Down, massacring most of the guards and burning Sullivan nearly to death. Henry tells Will that he has targeted children because they are "perfect vessels" that he can reshape in his own image. He taunts Will by explaining that Will's abduction in 1983 (Note: As depicted in the first season episode "Chapter One: The Vanishing of Will Byers" (2016)) taught him what was possible. Henry returns to the Upside Down, taking all eight children with him. Three Demogorgons prepare to kill Mike, Lucas, and Robin. Remembering his earlier conversation with Robin, Will's happiest childhood memories with Joyce, Jonathan, and Mike flash through his mind. This unleashes psychic abilities within him as he freezes the Demogorgons in midair and kills them, saving his friends.

== Production ==
On August 31, 2025, Ross Duffer posted to Instagram, confirming that "Sorcerer", along with episode three, "The Turnbow Trap", were complete. Regarding the episode, he teased, "'Sorcerer' is MASSIVE — as big as any finale we've ever done, and the most logistically insane shoot of our lives. We're still recovering".

=== Writing ===
The episode was written by series producer Paul Dichter, marking his fifth writing credit on the show.

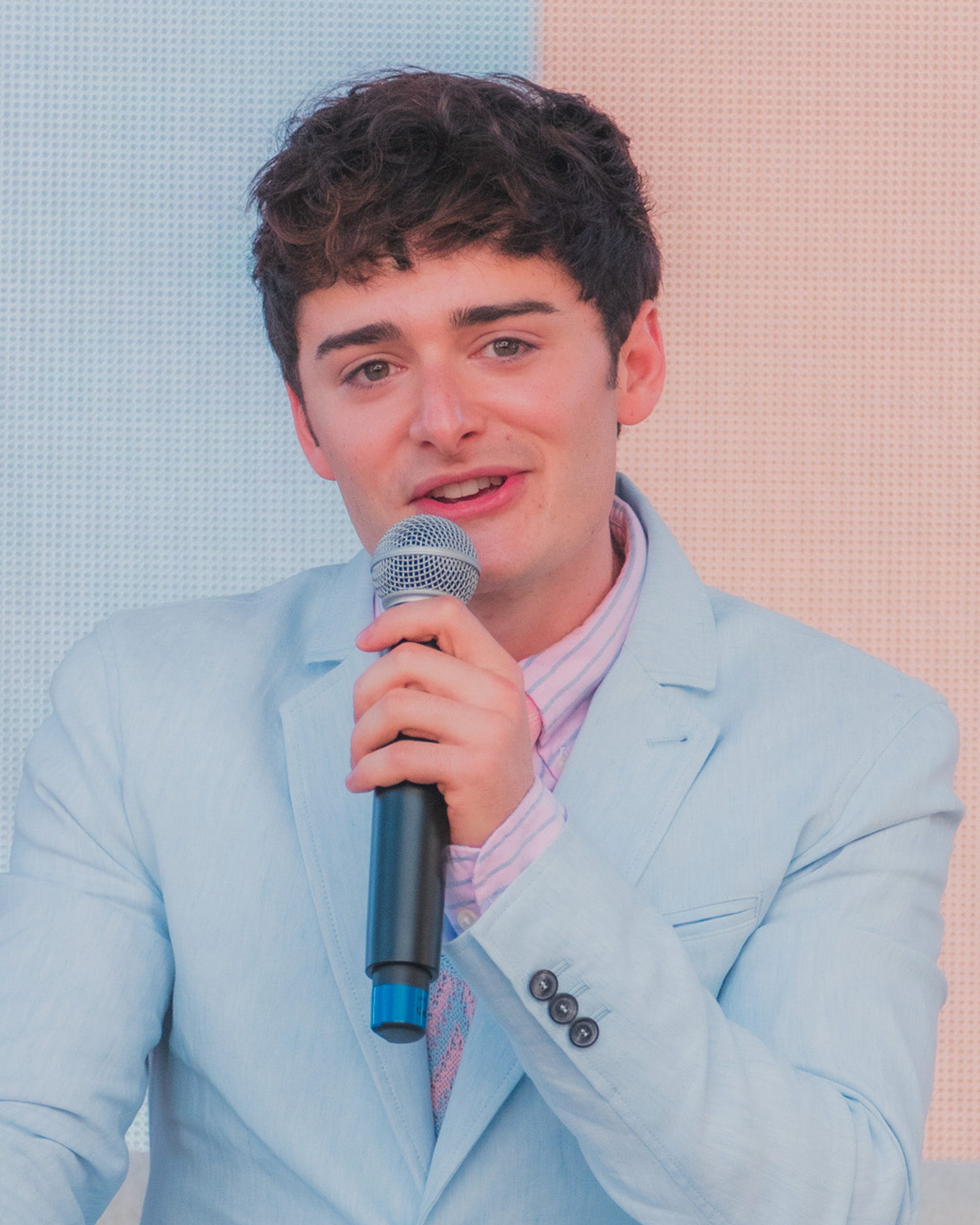
The episode's reveal that Will Byers, portrayed by Noah Schnapp, is able to channel Vecna's powers was used as the climactic cliffhanger ending to the season's first volume.

The Duffer Brothers stated that Will Byers having powers was something they had been planning for a long time, advising that, "it was something we always intended to do", and clarified that Will is able to channel Vecna's powers due to being in close proximity to him, rather than having powers himself like Eleven does. Matt Duffer noted that, "he taps into the hive mind, and then he can manipulate anything within the hive" which explains why he can control the Demogorgons, but could not, for example, open a door since that is not part of the hive. Of the reasons he accessed his powers in the fifth season, they adopted a "now or never" approach with this season being the final one and referenced Will's conversation with Robin Buckley as a major impetus for Will, explaining that, "we began talking about why now, and why is he able to do it now. Some of it is mythology-based in terms of the hive mind's closer than it's ever been for him. But most of what we were talking about was how has Will changed. Throughout the seasons, he's been a little more fearful than the others. He hasn't been a leader. He hasn't accepted himself in the way that some of our characters have. So I think it was really talking about if he really is able to at least start to accept himself for who he is, will that give him the kind of strength that he needs in order to access these powers?" The Brothers felt that the "high" of Will's powers contrasted well with the "low" of the children being taken by Vecna, and that it was clear that the reveal was the right time to end the season's first volume. Noah Schnapp, who portrays Will, spoke of his excitement when he read the script for the episode, referring to it as a "whiplash of a reveal" and noting that the Duffer Brothers had been teasing some "big stuff coming up" for him while they were writing the season. Due to the differences in Eleven and Will's powers, Schnapp wanted to alter his physicality to make the two visually distinct, and stated, "I consistently channeled a 6,000-pound silverback gorilla. I would watch videos of how they walk and how they move and breathe, and just grunt and imagine it as I'm getting into that to show that's not Baby Will in there." He described the moment as "an interwoven superhero coming-out story", reflecting on Will's conversation with Robin earlier in the episode helping him to feel more confident in his identity, as well as his own public coming out as a gay man in 2023. He described Will as "one of the best gay characters we've ever received in media" and that "accepting his identity allowed him to unleash this strength within him. That's a trope that that goes way beyond queerness, and I think can resonate with so many people". This point in the season culminates when Will truly starts to embrace himself after spending the entire last season struggling with his feelings, which the Duffers crafting its story arc to this specific moment because Will realizes that his deepest secret is what Vecna preys him with due to his fears of rejection, eventually leading to his coming out scene in "Chapter Seven: The Bridge".

Regarding the reveal of where Max Mayfield has been hiding in the Upside Down, the Duffers explained, "we knew she was trapped in Vecna's mindscape, and we knew that was going to be part of her journey, at least for Season 5. But it finally clicked when we realized that Holly could be there as well, and then the other kids. That's when her storyline really came to life", and stating that the concept of a mindscape was partially inspired by the Tarsem Singh film The Cell (2000). Sadie Sink stated that she was "curious" about Max's storyline in the season, following her falling into a coma at the end of the fourth season and spoke positively of working with Nell Fisher and Jamie Campbell Bower.

When discussing the reveal of Eight, Ross Duffer stated that they partially chose to bring back the character because they didn't want the audience to feel frustrated that a storyline had been "dropped" after the second season with no resolution, that they also believed that her actress Linnea Berthelsen hadn't been served well by her season two appearance, feeling that the character's presence "really helped" them to wrap up Eleven's story. Millie Bobby Brown, who plays Eleven, echoed their sentiments, stating, "I didn't know that she was coming back, so when I read it I was like, oh my god! Kali! It just felt like that storyline started and never actually got the closure it deserved. So I'm really excited. I think what's really exciting about the next volume is that she's back for a reason and it's pretty impactful". The Duffers specifically chose to bring Kali back to emphasize the dual threats that have been present in the show's run since the first season, with someone always replacing Dr. Martin Brenner, with Dr. Kay being that one this time around, so they opted to reunite Eleven with Kali so she could serve as a pessimistic but perhaps realistic contrast to her boyfriend's "butterflies and rainbows" worldview of what to do after dealing with Vecna, servicing Eleven's character arc leading up to the series finale.

=== Filming ===
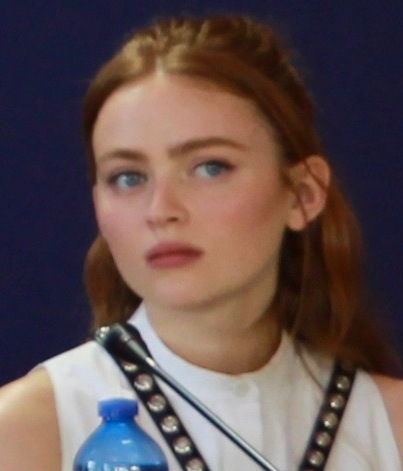
The fate of Max Mayfield, portrayed by Sadie Sink, was revealed in this episode following her apparent death at the end of season four.

"Sorcerer" was directed by series creators The Duffer Brothers, marking their twenty-second directing credits. The episode's climactic battle at the army base was filmed through a series of night shoots during July and August 2024, including a week of rehearsal. Part of scene was filmed in an 86-second extended oner. Of this decision, the Duffers stated that, while it was not originally written that way, the choice allowed the viewers to feel more immersed in the moment, though they expressed that it was "logistically the most difficult thing we ever did" due to the volume to actors , stunts, and visual effects. They clarified that the scene was "stitched together" from several shots that were filmed in four two-hour chunks across four nights rather than a "true" one-shot take due to the challenges of filming at night and with child actors. Schnapp explained that his solo beats throughout the final scenes were filmed in a week, and that he was nervous about his performance being able to live up to what was in the script. He prepared for the final shot of the episode, featuring him wiping blood from his nose and staring directly into the camera, by "religiously" watching an animated previz created by the show's visual effects team, stating that he "had a pretty clear idea of what [he] wanted it to look like in [his] head" by the time it came to filming. Schnapp got the shot in one take, noting that, ""I ran to the tent, we watched it. I looked at Ross and we just started laughing. We were like, 'Don't touch it! That's it. We're done.'" Schnapp stated that Will's face-off with Vecna was the stunt team's "biggest sequence of the season", and described his sole co-star Jamie Campbell Bower as "incredible". Finn Wolfhard, who plays Mike Wheeler, expressed that the sequence was his favorite part of season five to film. Entertainment Weekly released a video breaking down battle on their YouTube channel featuring the Duffer Brothers, Schnapp, Wolfhard, Caleb McLaughlin and the heads of the costume, sound editing, hair, and visual effects departments on December 1, 2025.

The scenes with Holly Wheeler and Max in Vecna's mindscape were a combination of on-location and set builds, with the team filming in a real forest and in part of the deserts of New Mexico, while the scenes within the cave took place on a specially-built set. Sink advised that the flashback scenes of her attempting to escape from Vecna's mindscape "took the longest to film", adding that "we were constantly picking it up throughout the year that Season 5 took. So that sequence wasn't even finished until our last month of filming, and it was also the first thing that I shot of that season, too". In order to protect the plot twist of Kali's return to the show, to prevent from the reveal leaking like how Matthew Modine's return as Dr. Martin Brenner did last season on the first day of filming because of paparazzi snapping a photo of his in a convertible, the Duffers asked Berthelsen to not come to the filming set with such vehicle and were impressed by how their team managed to protect Kali's return despite Berthelsen's presence on the set for months.

For the scene where Vecna massacres all of Lieutenant Colonel Jack Sullivan's forces (which was seen in the season's first volume trailer), in order to evoke the feeling that Vecna was really undefeatable, the Duffers felt inspired specifically by The Terminator (1984) and its sequel Terminator 2: Judgment Day (1991) due to the relentless quality of the bad guys in such films, with another cinematic reference for the sequence being Darth Vader's dramatic arrival in the Star Wars spin-off film Rogue One (2016) so the audience could see Vecna's powers in full display and "how exciting that was".

=== Music ===
The episode features "Premature Plans" by Elmer Bernstein (as featured in The Great Escape), "Sh-Boom" by The Chords, and "Running Up That Hill" by Kate Bush.

In the week following the debut of volume one, almost every song featured on the soundtrack experienced a massive surge in popularity. Billboard reported that "Running Up That Hill" saw an increase of 110%, to a total of 2.7 million streams, and re-entered the Hot Rock & Alternative Songs chart at number 15. The track also returned to the top 40 in Bush's native UK, re-entering the singles chart at number 37.

== Release ==
"Sorcerer" was released on November 26, 2025, on Netflix, alongside the three previous episodes comprising Stranger Things season 5 volume 1.

== Reception ==
=== Critical response ===
The episode received acclaim from critics. In a four star review of season five, Jack Seale of The Guardian stated, "episode four is a solidly thrilling 90 minutes of flame-throwing, bullet-dodging spectacle that makes good use of what looks like a virtually limitless effects budget, and which culminates in a moment that will have fans standing on their chairs and hollering joyfully."

Reviewing the episode itself, Jonathon Wilson of Ready Steady Cut summarized his four star review by writing, "Stranger Things Season 5 ends Volume 1 with an action-packed finale featuring a surprising return and giving Will his big moment", and praised how Will's conversation with Robin and acceptance of his sexuality was "cleverly" woven into his connection to Vecna and the Upside Down. Writing for Vulture, Maggie Fremont gave the episode five stars and referred to the final battle at the military base as "finale-level stuff", noting "If this is what they're giving us now, what are we in for next? I'm exhausted, both emotionally and physically speaking. (Complimentary.)" She praised the tension of the scenes, calling the camerawork "wild", and also praised Sadie Sink's delivery of Max's exposition to Holly in Vecna's mindscape, and refers to the reveal of Eight in Dr. Kay's vault as "a nice payoff" despite the poor critical reception to the character's appearance in season two. Kelli Lawler of USA Today lauded Will's character development in the episode, declaring that his final scenes are "a moment of catharsis for a character who's been poorly treated for most of the run of the show", and praised Schnapp's performance, stating, "it's gratifying to see Schnapp in such an omnipotent, fearsome state." She also called Robin's speech to Will "touching", praising Maya Hawke's emotion in the scene. She noted that the battle at the base was "thrilling", but mentioned that it was "annoyingly convenient to the plot" that the demogorgons were "far more preoccupied with killing soldiers than grabbing kids".

Writing for IGN, Tara Bennett referred to the episode's climax as "some of the [Duffer Brother]'s finest work on the series, rivaling prior season finales for its sheer scale and consequential reveals". She continued, "There's a lot to admire here about how the Duffers blend their converging storylines into a propulsive The Great Escape-meets-Children of Men mashup sequence. Using oners and exceptional pacing in the edit, this is an audacious closing battle that dares to cross-cut between an Upside Down jailbreak of children with a Demogorgon orgy of violence. It leaves things on a breathless note, but sets the viewer up for the last four episodes with a clearer understanding of Vecna's plans, an unexpected realignment of how Will's simmering connection might flip the power dynamic, and provides a path for Max's return to the fold. There's also a fantastic callback to Season 2 that might rectify one of the show's more controversial story arcs. Fans will be feeling the high of the cliff-hanger, while knowing there's only a month before the story gifts audiences with a final resolution." In a five star review of volume one, Sabrina Barr of Metro similarly wrote, "the final moments of episode four gave me full-body chills and honestly had me on the verge of screaming. Stranger Things season five volume one is epic, and will remind you why you fell in love with TV in the first place."

=== Accolades ===
Award	Category	Nominee(s)	Result	Ref.
Golden Reel Awards	Outstanding Achievement in Music Editing – Broadcast Long Form	Evyen Klean and David Klotz	Nominated	
Golden Reel Awards	Outstanding Achievement in Sound Editing – Broadcast Long Form Dialogue / ADR	Craig Henighan, Will Files, Ryan Cole, Polly McKinnon, Korey Pereira, Graham Terry, and Emma Present	Nominated	
Golden Reel Awards	Outstanding Achievement in Sound Editing – Broadcast Long Form Effects / Foley	Will Files, Craig Henighan, Angelo Palazzo, David Grimaldi, Katie Halliday, Nolan McNaughton, Christopher Bonis, Nicholas Interlandi, Steve Neal, Matt "Smokey" Cloud, Gina Wark, Peter Persaud, and Steve Baine	Nominated	
Primetime Creative Arts Emmy Awards	Outstanding Production Design for a Narrative Period or Fantasy Program (One Hour or More)	Chris Trujillo, Sean Brennan, and Jess Royal	Pending	
Primetime Creative Arts Emmy Awards	Outstanding Prosthetic Makeup	Barrie Gower, Duncan Jarman, Michael Mekash, and Emma Faulkes	Pending	
