= Atelier VM =

Italian jewelry design company

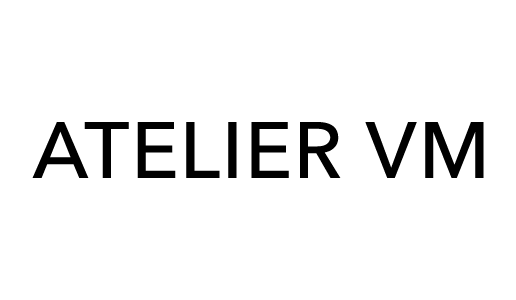
- Company type: Private company
- Industry: Jewelry
- Founded: 1998; 27 years ago Milan, Italy
- Founders: Marta Caffarelli, Viola Naj-Oleari
- Products: Welded bracelets, 18kt gold jewelry
- Revenue: € 6.115.314,00 (2024)
- Net income: € -967.820,00 (2024)
- Website: https://www.ateliervm.com

Atelier VM is an Italian jewelry brand founded in Milan, Italy, in 1998 by Marta Caffarelli and Viola Naj-Oleari.

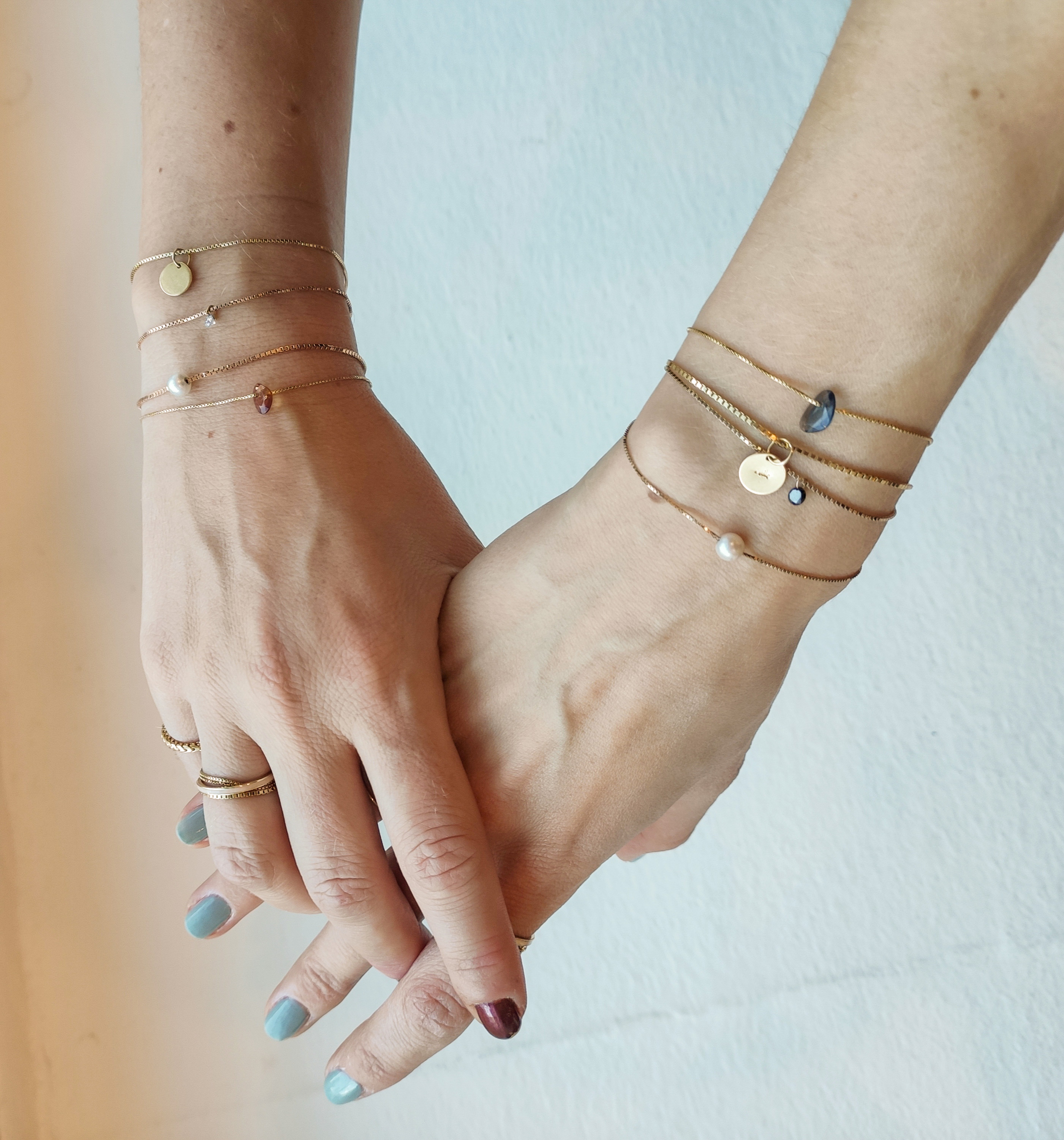
L’Essenziale bracelet by Atelier VM, welded 18-karat Gold thread.

== History ==
The company was founded in 1998 by high school friends Marta Caffarelli and Viola Naj-Oleari, who started by selling handmade pieces. They officially launched Atelier VM in 1998. Naj-Oleari studied industrial design at IED in Milan, while Caffarelli trained in goldsmithing in Paris, France.

In 2023, Atelier VM marked its 25th anniversary with an exhibition curated by Milovan Farronato and the release of a commemorative book.

== Products ==
In 2014, Atelier VM introduced L’Essenziale, an 18-karat gold thread bracelet welded directly onto the wrist without a clasp.

== Collaborations ==
British actress and model Amber Anderson has appeared in Atelier VM campaigns and collaborated with the brand on the design of the Mémoire jewel.
