= Tanya Burr =

English YouTuber and actress

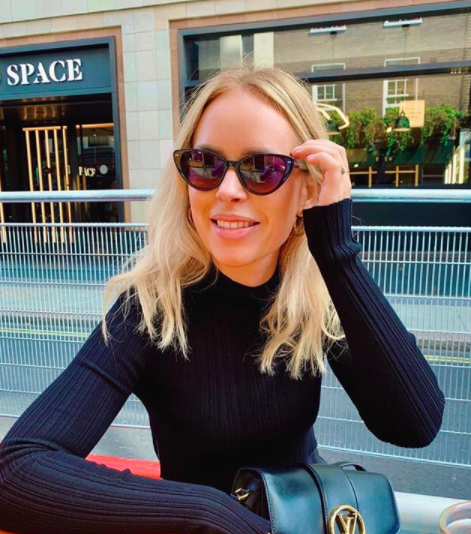
- Burr in 2020
- Born: 9 June 1989 (age 37); Norwich, Norfolk, England
- Occupations: YouTuber; actress
- Years active: 2009–present
- Spouse: Jim Chapman (m. 2015; div. 2019)
- Children: 1

YouTube information
- Channel: Tanya Burr
- Genres: Vlog; makeup; baking
- Subscribers: 3.08 million
- Views: 13.5 million
- Last updated: 21 October 2025
- Website: tanyaburr.co.uk

Tanya Burr (born 9 June 1989) is an English YouTuber and actress who began posting makeup and fashion videos to her YouTube channel in 2009. In 2017, Burr began pursuing a career in acting and has since had guest roles in series such as Bulletproof and Holby City, as well as the 2021 film Twist.

== Early life ==
Burr grew up in Norwich, Norfolk and attended Long Stratton High School and Notre Dame sixth form. After completing school, she studied to become a makeup artist before getting a job working at the beauty counter in Jarrold's department store in Norwich.

== Career ==
=== YouTube ===
While working at Jarrold's in 2009, Burr copied the advice of makeup artist and sister-in-law Samantha Chapman and created a YouTube channel. Burr left her job two years later to focus on her YouTube channel. Her earliest videos showed viewers how to recreate celebrity makeup looks. She later began making videos about fashion, style, and baking. Over the years, Burr has collaborated on videos with other YouTubers, including Zoe Sugg, Louise Pentland, Alfie Deyes, Tyler Oakley, and Joe Sugg. She appeared on the cover of Glamour UK December 2015 and the cover of Stylist in November 2016.

=== Acting ===
In 2017, Burr made her acting debut in the short film Disconnect. She also made an appearance as an extra in the Sky series Bulletproof. Burr made her professional stage debut in May 2018 in a revival of Judy Upton's Confidence. She played the lead role of Ella. She then starred in the 2019 film Hurt by Paradise in the role of Maud. The film premiered at the Edinburgh Film Festival in June 2019. Later that year, Burr appeared in the BBC medical series Holby City.

=== Other ventures ===
In 2014, Burr launched a cosmetics brand, through British retailer Superdrug, called Tanya Burr Cosmetics. The brand ceased production in 2018.

Burr has also written three books with the help of a ghostwriter. Her first book, Love, Tanya, features tips on beauty, vlogging, and baking. It was released by Penguin Books on 29 January 2015. She released a cookbook titled Tanya Bakes on 30 June 2016 and her third book, Tanya's Christmas, was released on 19 October 2017.

== Personal life ==
Burr met fellow YouTuber Jim Chapman in 2007. The two became engaged in December 2012 and married on 3 September 2015, at Babington House in Somerset, announcing the news through their social media accounts on 6 September. On 12 March 2019, Burr announced via Instagram that she and Chapman had decided to split up. Burr announced via Instagram on 14 June 2022 that she was pregnant and was expecting her first child with her partner, Dan. Their son was born in October 2022.

== Filmography ==
Television and film roles
Year	Title	Role	Notes
2017	Disconnect	Sophie	Short film
2018	Love Daily	Roxanne	1 episode
2018	Bulletproof	Rebecca	1 episode
2019	One Red Nose and a Wedding	Bridesmaid	Short film
2019	Hurt by Paradise	Maud	Film
2019	Holby City	Joanne Pearsons	1 episode
2021	Twist	Rosie	
2022	Venice at Dawn	Claudia	
2026	Christmas & Chaos	Rachel	Completed

Stage roles
Year	Title	Role	Venue	Ref.
2018	Confidence	Ella	Southwark Playhouse	

== Bibliography ==
- Love, Tanya (2015)
- Tanya Bakes (2016)
- Tanya's Christmas (2017)
