= Tell That to the Winter Sea =

- Directed by: Jaclyn Bethany
- Written by: Greta Bellamacina; Jaclyn Bethany
- Starring: Greta Bellamacina; Amber Anderson
- Release date: 31 May 2024
- Running time: 92 minutes
- Country: United Kingdom
- Language: English

Tell That to the Winter Sea is a 2024 British film written by Jaclyn Bethany and Greta Bellamacina, directed by Bethany and starring Bellamacina and Amber Anderson as co-leads.

== Cast ==
- Greta Bellamacina as Jo
- Amber Anderson as Scarlet
- Tamsin Egerton as Jade
- Jessica Plummer as Lily
- Josette Simon as Kat
- Bebe Cave as Jen

== Release ==
The film was released in theaters in the United Kingdom on 31 May 2024.

== Reception ==
Bradley Gibson of Film Threat scored the film a 7 out of 10. Phuong Le of The Guardian awarded the film three stars out of five. Kat Halstead of Common Sense Media awarded the film two stars out of five.
