= Commedia =

Commedia may refer to:

- Divine Comedy, a 1321 epic poem by Dante Alighieri, sometimes called the Commedia
- Commedia dell'arte, a professional form of theatre that began in Italy in the mid-16th century
- La Commedia, an early theatre in Naples
- Deceit (1999 film) (working title Commedia), an Italian mystery
- Commedia (2023 film), an Italian-English romantic drama

== See also ==
- Comedia (disambiguation)
