= Greta Bellamacina =

British actress & poet (born 1990)

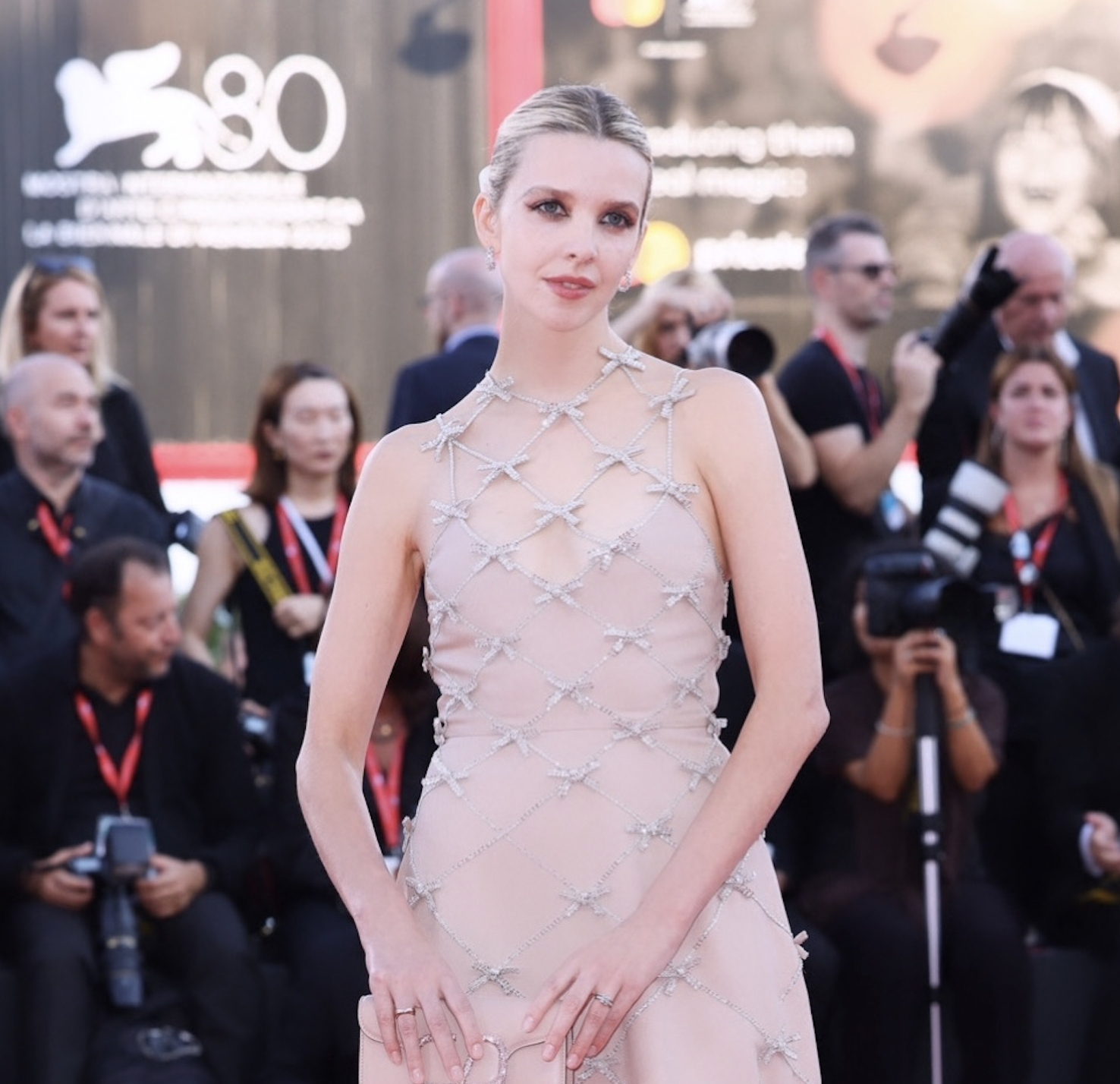
- Greta Bellamacina, 2023
- Born: Greta Rosanna Bellamacina; 16 September 1990 (age 36); Hampstead, London, England
- Education: Royal Academy of Dramatic Art; King's College London (BA); University of Cambridge(MA)
- Occupations: Actress, poet, model
- Height: 5 ft 8 in (173 cm)
- Spouse: Robert Montgomery (m. 2017)
- Children: 2

Greta Rosanna Bellamacina (born 16 September 1990) is a British actress, poet and filmmaker. Her film roles include This England (2022), Tell That to the Winter Sea (2024), Commedia (2023), Things and Other Things (2025) and Bunker (2026).

== Early life ==
Bellamacina was born in Hampstead, London, England, and raised in Camden. She attended Royal Academy of Dramatic Art to study acting, before attending King's College London, where she graduated with a BA in English.

== Acting ==
In 2019 Bellamacina was nominated for Best Performance at the Edinburgh International Film Festival for her lead role in Hurt by Paradise, which was nominated for the Michael Powell Award for Best British Feature Film at Edinburgh, and for Best UK Feature at the Raindance Film Festival.

She worked with Michael Winterbottom in 2022, playing the part of Cleo Watson in his six-part political TV drama This England (originally titled This Sceptred Isle) for Sky Atlantic and Now. The same year she worked on Clio Barnard's adaptation of The Essex Serpent for Apple TV. She played the lead role in the Italian director Riccardo Vannuccini's duology Commedia (2023) and Things and Other Things (2025). Her performance in Commedia earned her a Stanley Kubrick Award for Best Actress at the Stanley Film Awards.

She co-starred in Jaclyn Bethany's acclaimed film Tell That to the Winter Sea (2024), alongside Amber Anderson. The Guardian wrote, "Bellamacina shares a striking chemistry with Anderson. Playing different ages is a difficult task, and the two actresses embody both schoolgirl angst and grownup blues with impressive ease ... the symbiotic alchemy between long-time collaborators Bethany and Bellamacina remains impressive, and an auspicious sign for their future projects."

Further film credits include Jamie Adams' British romantic drama Venice at Dawn (2023), in which Bellamacina plays the co-lead opposite Fabien Frankel. She portrayed the protagonist the Duchess of Berry in Luis Leitao's film Lake-Mouthed (2024). Variety has announced she will appear as co-lead alongside Honor Swinton Byrne, playing sisters, in Jaclyn Bethany's next film, All Five Eyes (2025).

In 2026 Bellamacina portrayed the character Jennifer in Bunker, alongside Penelope Cruz and Javier Bardem, directed by Florian Zeller. She made her stage debut playing the lead character Pseudolus, in writer and director Conor Bifulco's Oh Pseudolus! at the Cockpit Theatre.

== Poetry ==
Bellamacina was shortlisted as Young Poet Laureate of London in 2014.

In 2016, Bellamacina and artist Robert Montgomery co-founded New River Press. In 2016 Bellamacina co-wrote a collection of collaborative poetry with Montgomery entitled Points for Time in the Sky, a psychogeographical journey through modern Britain, and a rare example of collaborative poetry in British literature.

In 2018, she was commissioned by the National Poetry Library to write a group of poems for their Odyssey series, modern mediations on Homer's Odyssey. In the same year, she published her collection,Selected Poems 2015–2017. Pierpaolo Piccioli commissioned Bellamacina to write ten love poems to coincide with his FW19 collection for Valentino fashion house.

Bellamacina's poetry collection Tomorrow's Woman was published in 2020 by US publisher Andrews McMeel Publishing alongside a volume of feminist poetry she edited titled Smear. In the same year the collection was translated into Spanish and published by Valparaíso Ediciones with translations by poet Juan José Vélez Otero. The collection was launched at the Shakespeare and Company bookstore in Paris.

In 2024 she issued another poetry collection entitled Who Will Make The Fire, published by Cheerio Publishing.

== Awards ==
In 2019, Bellamacina's debut film Hurt by Paradise was nominated for "Best UK Feature" at both Raindance Film Festival and Edinburgh International Film Festival 73rd edition. Bellamacina was also nominated for the prestigious Michael Powell Award for her performance as Celeste. Filmotomy said "Bellamacina has it in her to become one of the great contemporary female voices in British cinema." The Evening Standard wrote, "Bellamacina is as precise and bold as Joanna Hogg."

In 2022, Bellamacina won the Stanley Kubrick Award for Best Actress at the Stanley Film Awards for her performance in Riccardo Vannuccini's film Commedia.

== Modelling ==
Bellamacina has appeared in ads for brands such as Prada, Chanel, Rimmel London, Mulberry, Stella McCartney, ‘Paul & Joe’ and The Vampire's Wife. She has walked in catwalk shows such as Dilara Fındıkoğlu and Dolce & Gabbana.

She has featured internationally on magazine covers such as Vogue, Harper's Bazaar, Exit, Marie Claire, Numéro, and L'Officiel.

She has worked with photographers such as Jurgen Teller, Liz Collins, Tom Craig, Rankin (photographer), Cass Bird, Venetia Scott and Oliver Hadlee Pearch.

== Personal life ==
Bellamacina is married to Scottish artist-poet Robert Montgomery. The couple have three children: two sons and one daughter.

== Filmography ==
=== Film ===
Year	Title	Character	Notes
2005	Harry Potter and the Goblet of Fire	Stephanie	Warner Bros
2010	Impossible Feet	Barbie	BraineHownd Films
2013	Blake's Wife	Catherine Blake	
2013	San Francisco Love Story	Willow	
2014	A Surrealist Account After Dark	Ella	Directed by Eduardo Gonzalez
2016	Romanic Love	Pregnant Sitter	Directed by Alex Franco
2017	Myths Not for Sale	Blaise	Directed and co-written by Greta Bellamacina
2017	The Last Birthday	Maria Romanova	European Independent Film Award
2018	Indigo Valley	Jane	
2019	Hurt by Paradise	Celeste	Nominated for The Michael Powell Award for Best British Feature Film, Edinburgh International Film Festival 2019
2020	The Long Game	Felicity	Directed by Lauren McLaughlin
2021	Highway 1	Ina	Santa Barbara International Film Festival
2022	Venice at Dawn	Sally	Directed by Jamie Adams
2022	Free	Sally	Directed by Lauren McLaughlin
2023	Commedia	Irene	Directed by Riccardo Vannuccini
2023	Lake-Mouthed	Duchess of Berry	Directed by Luis Leitao
2024	Tell That to the Winter Sea	Jo	Directed by Jaclyn Bethany
2025	Things and Other Things	Irene	Directed by Riccardo Vannuccini
2025	Weaving Anni Albers	Anni Albers	Directed by Alessandro Del Vigna
2026	Bunker	Jennifer	Directed by Florian Zeller
TBA	All Five Eyes		

=== Television ===
Year	Title	Role	Director	Notes
2022	This England	Cleo Watson	Directed by Michael Winterbottom & Julian Jarrold	Recurring role Sky Atlantic and Now
2022	The Essex Serpent		Directed by Clio Barnard	Apple TV+ series

=== Theatre ===
Year	Title	Notes
2022	"Ara Pacis"	Special performance held at Ara Pacis
2026	"Oh Pseudolus!"	Bellamacina played the lead character Pseudolus at the Cockpit Theatre.
