= Comedia =

Comedia or Comédia may refer to:

== Performing arts ==
- Comedia (festival), a comedy film festival taking place in July as part of the larger Just for Laughs comedy festival
- Comedia (Spanish play), a genre of three-act play in the Spanish Golden Age tradition
- The Divine Comedy of Dante Alighieri, referred to by Dante in his own Italian as Comedìa (questa comedìa, la mia comedìa)
- Théâtre Libre (performing arts center), formerly known as Comédia, a theatre in Paris

== Other uses ==
- Comedia (album), a 1978 salsa album by Héctor Lavoe
- Comedia (trade union), former trade union in Switzerland
- SIC Comédia, a Portuguese television station

== See also ==
- Commedia (disambiguation)
- Comœdia, a French literary and artistic newspaper, 1907-1944
