= This England (TV series) =

2022 British television docudrama by Michael Winterbottom

- Promotional poster
- Genre: Drama
- Written by: Michael Winterbottom; Kieron Quirke
- Directed by: Michael Winterbottom; Julian Jarrold; Anthony Wilcox; Mat Whitecross
- Starring: Kenneth Branagh; Simon Paisley Day; Ophelia Lovibond; Andrew Buchan
- Theme music composer: David Holmes
- Country of origin: United Kingdom
- Original language: English
- No. of series: 1
- No. of episodes: 6

Production
- Executive producer: Richard Brown
- Producers: Melissa Parmenter; Josh Hyams
- Production companies: Fremantle; Passenger; Revolution Films

Original release
- Network: Sky Atlantic
- Release: 28 September 2022

This England (originally titled This Sceptred Isle) is a British docudrama television miniseries written by Michael Winterbottom and Kieron Quirke and starring Kenneth Branagh as Boris Johnson. It premiered on 28 September 2022 on Sky Atlantic. The series depicts the COVID-19 pandemic in the United Kingdom during the Boris Johnson administration, and is based on testimonies from people in the administration, advisory groups, and affected British institutions.

== Premise ==
Boris Johnson wins a landslide victory in the December 2019 general election under the Get Brexit Done slogan, but within a few months faces the COVID-19 pandemic in the United Kingdom, for which he is ultimately hospitalised, and the birth of his first child with his then partner Carrie Symonds.

The series is based on testimonies from people in the Boris Johnson administration, on the intergovernmental advisory groups, including the Scientific Advisory Group for Emergencies, and in other affected British institutions such as care homes and hospitals.

== Cast and characters ==
- Kenneth Branagh as Boris Johnson
- Simon Paisley Day as Dominic Cummings
- Ophelia Lovibond as Carrie Symonds
- Andrew Buchan as Matt Hancock
- Derek Barr as Lee Cain
- James Corrigan as Isaac Levido
- Jimmy Livingstone as Prof. Chris Whitty
- Simon Treves as Prof. Sir Stephen Powis, Medical Director NHS England
- Julia Farino as Amanda Pritchard, Chief Operating Officer, NHS England
- Simon Lowe as James Slack
- Philip Buck as Martin Reynolds
- Neil Stuke as Senior Civil Servant, Department of Health
- Shri Patel as Rishi Sunak
- Aimée Kelly as Alison and Elise Larkin
- Joe Bannister as Jack Doyle
- Greta Bellamacina as Cleo Watson
- Rina Mahoney as Julie
- Olivier Huband as Jamie Njoku-Goodwin
- Oli Higginson as Saul
- Adrian Harris as Duncan Selbie
- Alec Nicholls as Sir Patrick Vallance
- Ben Lloyd-Hughes as Ben Gascoigne
- Michael Colgan as Gabriel Milland
- Salima Saxton as Teena
- Wasim Zakir as Dr. Amir Hamdi
- Tom Andrews as Dr. Tom Armstrong
- Justin Edwards as Mark Sedwill
- Lee Comley as Ben
- Ravin J. Ganatra as Roshan
- Helen Monks as Jodie
- Albin Calderon as Manny
- Heather Peace as Mary Wakefield
- Ruth Redman as Yvonne Doyle
- Isabella Javor as Lara
- Roisin Rae as Sally
- Joan Walker as Sharon Peacock

Tim Harford, Kate Lawson and Richard Vadon also appear as themselves presenting More or Less.

== Episodes ==
No.	Title	Directed by	Written by	Original release date
1	"Episode 1"	Julian Jarrold; Michael Winterbottom	Michael Winterbottom; Kieron Quirke	28 September 2022
2	"Episode 2"	Julian Jarrold; Anthony Wilcox	Michael Winterbottom; Kieron Quirke	28 September 2022
3	"Episode 3"	Julian Jarrold; Anthony Wilcox	Michael Winterbottom; Kieron Quirke	28 September 2022
4	"Episode 4"	Julian Jarrold; Anthony Wilcox	Michael Winterbottom; Kieron Quirke	28 September 2022
5	"Episode 5"	Julian Jarrold; Anthony Wilcox	Michael Winterbottom; Kieron Quirke	28 September 2022
6	"Episode 6"	Julian Jarrold; Mat Whitecross; Michael Winterbottom	Michael Winterbottom; Kieron Quirke	28 September 2022

== Production ==
The miniseries was announced in June 2020 as This Sceptred Isle. It was co-written by Michael Winterbottom and Kieron Quirke. Kenneth Branagh's casting as Boris Johnson was announced in January 2021. The series was produced by Fremantle, Passenger and Revolution Films, with Richard Brown of Passenger and Melissa Parmenter of Revolution Films serving as executive producers.

All episodes were originally set to be directed by Winterbottom. After the miniseries began filming in February 2021, Winterbottom stepped down from directing in March, reportedly due to health issues. He was replaced by Julian Jarrold. Tim Shipman, political editor of The Sunday Times, acted as a consultant. In March 2021, Ophelia Lovibond and Simon Paisley Day joined the cast as Carrie Symonds and Dominic Cummings.

In 2022, it was announced that Sky had changed the title from This Sceptred Isle to This England. Both phrases are taken from the same passage in Shakespeare's Richard II. The miniseries was set to premiere on 21 September 2022. On 9 September 2022, the premiere was pushed back to 28 September 2022, in respect of the UK period of mourning for the late Queen Elizabeth II.

The music was composed by David Holmes, a Northern-Irish musician and composer.

== Broadcast ==
The six-episode series premiered on 28 September 2022 on Sky Atlantic and Now.

== Reception ==
The series received mixed reviews, with some British critics feeling that it was too soon for such a drama. The Independent said: "here comes the show that precisely nobody was asking for". The New York Times said it "debuted with solid ratings" and said, "It adds up to a heartbreaking depiction of the pressure on health workers, and the fear, pain and often lonely deaths of those hooked up to ventilators". The Times praised the series and called it "An impressive enterprise but not an easy watch". The Irish Times said "If you can stomach the material, this show is hugely watchable".

Branagh was praised for his performance, with The Times calling it mesmerising. The Guardian and New Statesman felt the series was overly sympathethic to Johnson, as well as sanitised and detached from the front line experience. The NME praised the series, but said that the format "takes some getting used to" as it oscillates between harrowing scenes in hospitals to events that resemble the 2005 BBC political satire The Thick of It.

== See also ==
- Brexit: The Uncivil War, a 2019 film featuring Dominic Cummings and Boris Johnson
- COVID-19 pandemic in popular culture
- Boris Johnson in popular culture
- Politics in fiction
