= Things and Other Things (film) =

2024 film by Riccardo Vannuccini

- Directed by: Riccardo Vannuccini
- Written by: Riccardo Vannuccini
- Produced by: Artestudio
- Starring: Greta Bellamacina; Riccardo Vannuccini
- Cinematography: Manolo Cinti
- Edited by: Priscilla Muscat
- Music by: Pietro Freddi
- Production company: Artestudio
- Release date: 2025
- Running time: 93 minutes
- Country: Italy
- Language: Italian

Things and Other Things is a 2025 Italian-English drama film written and directed by Riccardo Vannunccini. It is a sequel to the 2023 film Commedia. The film stars the recurring character Irene, played by Greta Bellamacina in both films, alongside Vannunncini, who plays the character Rocco. The two characters live in a post-industrial environment that has been destroyed by the industrialization of the twentieth century. Things and Other Things was filmed on location in Tuscany in the Italian countryside mostly in abandoned buildings.

== Costume ==
The costumes for Bellamacina’s character were designed by Pier Paolo Piccioli for Valentino, including a custom blue dress with a 6-metre train made for the film.

== Cast ==
- Greta Bellamacina as Irene
- Riccardo Vannuccini as Rocco
- Gabriele Guerra as Don Quixote
- Maria Sandrelli as traveller
- Alessandra Piscopo as traveller
