= Kieron Quirke =

English writer

Kieron Quirke is an English writer.

== Early life ==
Quirke was educated at King Edward's School, Birmingham and the Junior Royal Academy of Music.

Quirke attended Merton College, Oxford. He was Librarian of the Oxford Union and left with a Double First in Classics. He is a member and former Scholar of Inner Temple

== Journalism ==
FT Young Critic of the Year in 2003, Quirke wrote on theatre for the Evening Standard before he made it as a TV writer.

== Television ==
Quirke wrote television for many years with Robin French. Their early output included work on children's drama I Dream, and the comedy sketch show, Man Stroke Woman.

Quirke and French created Roommates, a new sitcom which premiered on ABC Family on 23 March 2009. Their eight-part drama Trinity appeared on British television from September 2009. They were nominated amongst the Hot Shot Writers of 2008 by Broadcast magazine.

In 2012 the sitcom Cuckoo, created and written by Quirke and French, aired on BBC Three. It ran to five series on BBC3 and BBC1.

Quirke created and wrote the BBC TV sitcom, Defending the Guilty, which premiered in 2019. A second series was commissioned, but later cancelled due to the COVID-19 pandemic.

He has recently co-written This England with Michael Winterbottom, which premiered on Sky Atlantic on 28 September 2022.
