= Venice at Dawn =

2022 film by Jamie Adams

Venice At Dawn
- Directed by: Jamie Adams
- Written by: Jamie Adams
- Produced by: Sulk Youth; Wotch
- Starring: Greta Bellamacina; Fabien Frankel; Tanya Burr
- Cinematography: Sashi Kissoon
- Edited by: Mike Hopkins; Amy Pettipher
- Music by: Ashley Adams
- Production company: Sulk Youth
- Distributed by: Sulk Youth
- Release dates: 30 August 2022 (London); 3 February 2023 (United Kingdom)
- Running time: 82 minutes
- Country: United Kingdom
- Language: English

Venice At Dawn is a 2022 British romantic drama film written and directed by Jamie Adams, starring Greta Bellamacina, Fabien Frankel and Tanya Burr.

Venice At Dawn had its world premiere at the Everyman Cinema in Broadgate, London on 30 August 2022, and is set to be released in the United Kingdom on 10 December 2023 by Amazon Prime.

== Synopsis ==
The plot follows two unlikely thieves, Dixon (Frankel) and Sally (Bellamacina), who after meeting drunkenly in a bar plot to steal an expensive painting from Sally's ex-boyfriend Stephen (Tom Basden).

== Cast ==
- Greta Bellamacina as Sally
- Fabien Frankel as Dixon
- Tanya Burr as Claudia
- Tom Basden as Stephen
- Sophie Kennedy Clark as Cindy
- Ruhtxjiaïh Bèllènéa
- Celyn Jones as Detective Symonds
- Vanessa Grasse as Sarah
- Richard Elis as Fadz
- Nick Helm as McGuigan
- Edem-Ita Duke as Mickey
- Tom Meeten as Sonny
- Rebecca Marangos as Susan
- Max Frankel as Gino

== Production ==
Principal photography finished in London in February 2020, with some filming taking place at The Troubadour. The film has been said to be made in an improvisational style that Adams also deployed on previous pictures such as Black Mountain Poets and Love Spreads.

== Release ==
Venice At Dawn had its world premiere at the Everyman Cinema in Broadgate, London on 30 August 2022, and is set to have a wide release in the United Kingdom on 10 December 2023 by Amazon Prime.
