= Hurt by Paradise =

- Directed by: Greta Bellamacina
- Written by: Greta Bellamacina; Sadie Brown
- Produced by: Sulk Youth
- Starring: Greta Bellamacina; Camilla Rutherford; Jaime Winstone; Nicholas Rowe; Sadie Brown; Anna Brewster
- Cinematography: Fabio Paleari
- Edited by: Daniel Jaroschik; Martine Skogstad
- Music by: Dalal Bruchmann; Jeff Franzel
- Production company: Sulk Youth
- Distributed by: Moviehouse Entertainment
- Release date: July 21, 2019 (Edinburgh)
- Running time: 76 minutes
- Country: United Kingdom
- Language: English

Hurt by Paradise is a British comedy-drama film directed by Greta Bellamacina. The film stars Bellamacina as Celeste, a single mother and her unexpected friendship with her babysitter, a middle-aged failed actress.

The film was nominated for the Michael Powell Award for Best British Feature Film and Best Performance at Edinburgh International Film Festival 2019 and for Best UK Feature Film at Raindance Film Festival 2019.

== Cast ==
- Greta Bellamacina as Celeste
- Sadie Brown as Stella
- Tanya Burr as Maud
- Jaime Winstone as Janette
- Camilla Rutherford as Estelle
- Anna Brewster as Tessa
- Jazzy De Lisser as Lori
- Nicholas Rowe as Jonathan Birchwood
- Bruno Aleph Wizard as Roman

== Filming ==
Hurt by Paradise was shot in Camden and Soho, London.

== Reception ==
The Evening Standard wrote, "Bellamacina is as precise and bold as Joanna Hogg."

Another Magazine called the film "spellbinding".

Filmotomy said "Bellamacina has it in her to become one of the great contemporary female voices in British cinema."

On review aggregator website Rotten Tomatoes, the film has an approval rating of 80%.
