= Before the World Set on Fire =

2023 drama film

- Directed by: Jaclyn Bethany
- Written by: Jaclyn Bethany
- Produced by: Rebecca Morandi
- Starring: Joe Adler; Mary Neely; David Call; Brooke Bloom; Eve Connolly; Julia Sarah Stone
- Cinematography: Irene Gomez-Emilsson; Mélisse Riahi
- Music by: Marco Pedrazzi
- Production companies: Bettye Katherine Edwards Films; Maua Media; Neon Heart Productions
- Release date: November 5, 2023 (New Orleans Film Festival)
- Country: United States
- Language: English

Before the World Set on Fire is a 2023 American mystery drama film directed and written by Jaclyn Bethany. The film stars Joe Adler, Mary Neely, David Call, Brooke Bloom, Eve Connolly and Julia Sarah Stone. The film, shot and set during the COVID-19 pandemic, explores the tensions between a professor and her students.

The film premiered at the New Orleans Film Festival on November 5, 2023.

== Plot ==
The story begins with Professor Anya Davis being interrogated by college authorities regarding the death of one of her students, Wilder Buck-Hewitt, who died by suicide during an online seminar.

As the investigation unfolds, the film flashes back to the online seminar, where Professor Davis leads a group of undergraduate students in a heated discussion on philosophy and human connection. The students, including Wilder, engage in intense debates and personal revelations, revealing their deepest fears, desires, and insecurities.

As the seminar progresses, tensions rise, and the students' emotions reach a boiling point. Meanwhile, the lockdown outside intensifies, and the students' isolation fuels their anxieties and paranoia.

Through a series of flashbacks and interrogations, the film reveals the events leading up to Wilder's suicide, exposing the complex web of relationships and motivations among the characters.

== Cast ==
- Joe Adler as Kasper
- Mary Neely as Molly
- David Call as Cole
- Brooke Bloom as Anya Davis
- Eve Connolly as Mara
- Julia Sarah Stone as Hanna
- Samuel H. Levine as Wilder Buck-Hewitt
- Stephen Friedrich as Vlad
- Alex Hurt as Reed
- Sophia Dunn-Walker as Abby
- Alex Breaux as Parker

== Production ==
Principal photography began on July 1, 2020, and concluded on August 1, 2020. Some shooting also took place later in 2022.

The film is Bethany's third drama feature.

== Reception ==
One review found that it was "a solid thriller" "that has us feeling lost and confused." The film was also described as "a drama set during the pandemic ... so that the production conditions adapt perfectly to the plot of the film, whose managers work from their respective containment whereabouts and communicate via Zoom."
