= Jim Chapman (YouTuber) =

English YouTuber, model and writer (born 1987)

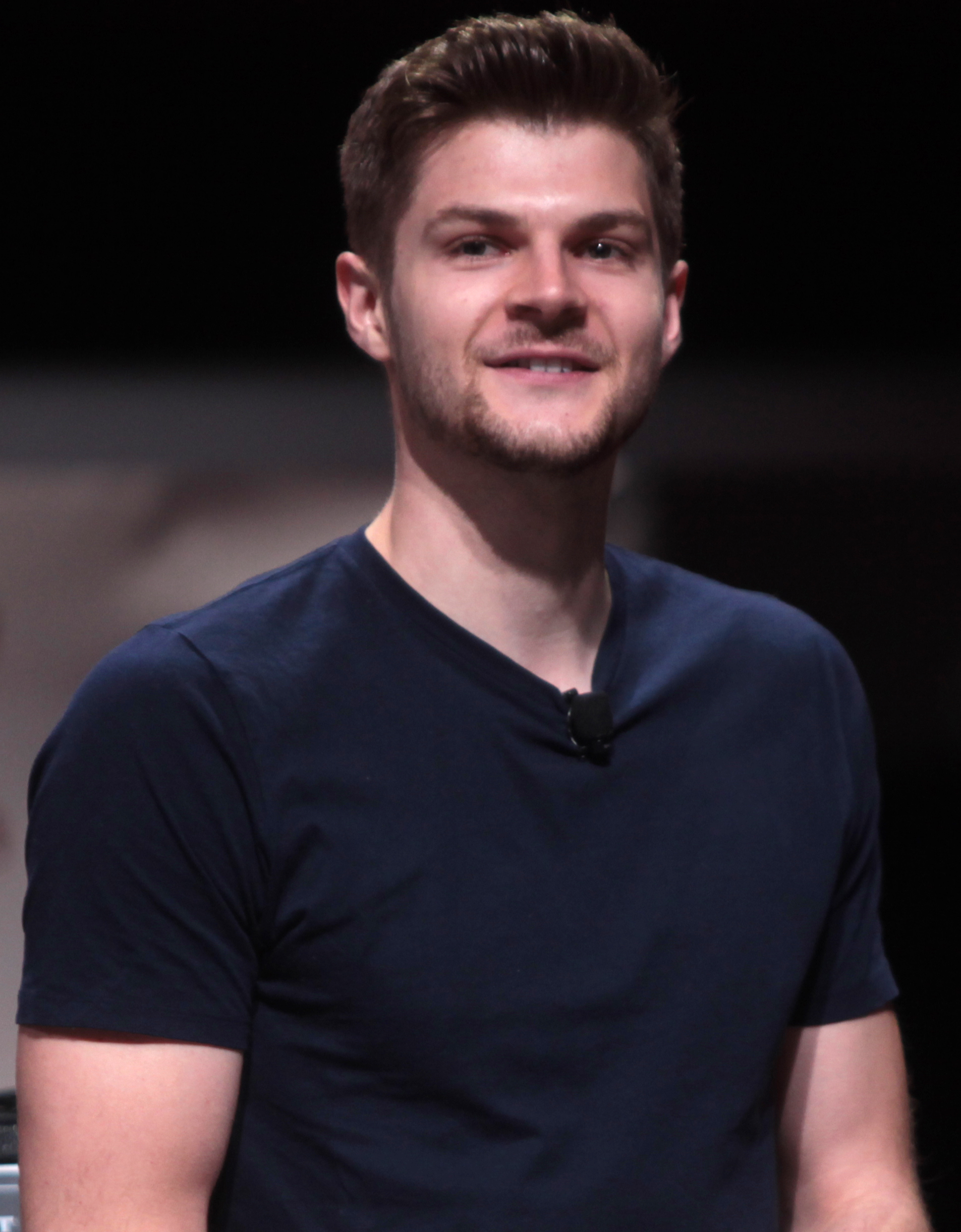
- Chapman in 2014
- Born: 28 December 1987 (age 38); London, England
- Education: University of East Anglia (BSc)
- Occupation: YouTuber
- Spouses: Tanya Burr (m. 2015; div. 2019); Sarah Tarleton (m. 2022)
- Children: 2
- Relatives: Samantha Chapman (sister)

YouTube information
- Channel: Jim Chapman
- Years active: 2011–present
- Genres: Vlogs; fashion
- Subscribers: 2.07 million
- Views: 111 million
- Last updated: 19 June 2026
- Website: jimchapman.co.uk

Jim Chapman (born 28 December 1987) is an English YouTuber. Chapman began posting videos on his YouTube channel in 2010 and released his first book, titled 147 Things, on 5 October 2017.

== Career ==
Chapman graduated from the University of East Anglia with a Bachelor of Science in Psychology, he planned to do a master's degree, but decided not to continue in order to pursue his online career.

Chapman created his first "j1mmyb0bba" YouTube channel (known as simply "Jim Chapman") in 2010 where he produces videos on men's fashion and grooming. He was part of the 'YouTube Boyband' that raised money for Comic Relief and was featured in The Guardian.

Chapman is influential through social media. As of 1 July 2016 Chapman has over 2.5 million subscribers to his main YouTube channel and over 159 million video views. He has over 1 million subscribers to his second YouTube channel. He has over 1.8 million followers on Twitter and 2.2 million on Instagram. Chapman has done a number of collaborations on his channel with other YouTubers, including: Marcus Butler, Alfie Deyes, Louise Pentland, Grace Helbig, Tyler Oakley, Zoe Sugg, Joe Sugg, Louis Cole, Caspar Lee and many others.

== Personal life ==
Chapman grew up in Wilby, outside Attleborough, and attended Old Buckenham High School followed by Notre Dame High School for Sixth Form. He is the brother of make-up artists Samantha Chapman and Nicola Chapman Haste of the PixiWoo YouTube channel and founders of the Real Techniques make-up brushes. He also has a twin brother, John, who co-runs the Lean Machines YouTube channel.

On 3 September 2015, Chapman married Tanya Burr. On 12 March 2019, Chapman made a statement via Instagram to announce that they had split up.

On 26 July 2020, Chapman announced his engagement to Sarah Tarleton, after 16 months of dating. On 1 March 2021, Chapman announced they were expecting their first child together. Their daughter was born in September 2021. On 28 March 2022, Chapman and Tarleton were officially married at the Santa Barbara courthouse in California. In early September 2022, they held a wedding ceremony at Villa Luisa in Seville, Spain, attended by family and friends. On 2 August 2023, Chapman and Tarleton announced the arrival of their second child together, a son.
