= In Transit (2025 film) =

2025 American drama film

- Directed by: Jaclyn Bethany
- Written by: Alex Sarrigeorgiou
- Produced by: C.C. Kellogg; Jaclyn Bethany; Alex Sarrigeorgiou; Sarah Keyes; Tara Sheffer
- Starring: Alex Sarrigeorgiou; François Arnaud; Jennifer Ehle
- Cinematography: Sam Tetro
- Edited by: Shannon C. Griffin
- Music by: Juampa
- Production companies: Valmora Productions; BKE Productions; Little Language Films; Good Question Media
- Distributed by: Factory 25
- Release dates: August 17, 2025 (Edinburgh); November 1, 2026 (United States)
- Running time: 85 minutes
- Country: United States
- Language: English

In Transit is a 2025 drama film, directed by Jaclyn Bethany, from a screenplay by Alex Sarrigeorgiou. It stars Sarrigeorgiou, François Arnaud and Jennifer Ehle.

It had its world premiere at the Edinburgh International Film Festival on August 17, 2025. It is scheduled to be released in a limited release on November 1, 2026, prior to video on demand on December 1, 2026, by Factory 25.

== Premise ==
A painter invites a young bartender to pose for her leading to a relationship that will change both women forever.

== Cast ==
- Alex Sarrigeorgiou as Lucy
- François Arnaud as Tom
- Jennifer Ehle as Ilse

== Production ==
In December 2023, Alex Sarrigeorgiou, François Arnaud and Jennifer Ehle joined the cast of the film, with Jaclyn Bethany directing from a screenplay by Sarrigeorgiou. Principal photography took place in Maine before moving to New York City.

== Release ==
In Transit premiered at the Edinburgh International Film Festival on August 17, 2025. It also screened at the Deauville American Film Festival on September 8, 2025. The film's North American premiere was at NewFest on October 10, 2025, where it won the Audience Award for Best Narrative Feature.

In Transit was acquired by Factory 25 for a theatrical release beginning November 1, 2026, followed by a digital release on December 1, 2026.
