= Cleo Watson =

British political adviser

- Education: Haberdashers' Monmouth School for Girls; Cardiff University
- Occupations: Author, special adviser

Cleo Watson is a British author and former special adviser to Prime Minister Boris Johnson.

== Education ==
Watson attended Haberdashers' Monmouth School for Girls. She grew up in Hay-on-Wye and studied politics and economics at Cardiff University.

== Career ==
In 2012, Watson interned for the Barack Obama 2012 presidential campaign. She joined 10 Downing Street in 2019 as an ally of Dominic Cummings and a former employee at Vote Leave.

She described working for Boris Johnson during the COVID-19 pandemic as being like a "nanny" to him. She was fined after the Partygate scandal. Following the Sue Gray report it emerged that Watson had organised the event. In November 2020, she left Downing Street alongside Dominic Cummings and Lee Cain. In September 2022, she was a panellist on the debut episode of Sunday with Laura Kuenssberg on BBC One.

Watson is an author of two books. In 2024, she described Johnson as "quiet, bookish and, occasionally, extremely nasty".

== Personal life ==
Watson's sister Annabel worked as chief of staff for Theresa May from 2006 and 2010 when she was Shadow Leader of the House of Commons and Shadow Work and Pensions Secretary.

== In popular culture ==
Watson was portrayed by Naomi Battrick in the Channel 4 drama Partygate. She was portrayed by Greta Bellamacina in the Sky Atlantic docudrama television miniseries This England.

== Bibliography ==
- Whips (2022)
- Cleavage (2024)
