= Robert Montgomery (artist) =

Scottish sculptor and poet (born 1972)

- Born: Robert Montgomery; July 1972 (age 53); Chapelhall, North Lanarkshire, Scotland
- Education: Edinburgh College of Art
- Movement: Installation art
- Spouse: Greta Bellamacina (m. 2017)
- Children: 2
- Website: robertmontgomery.org

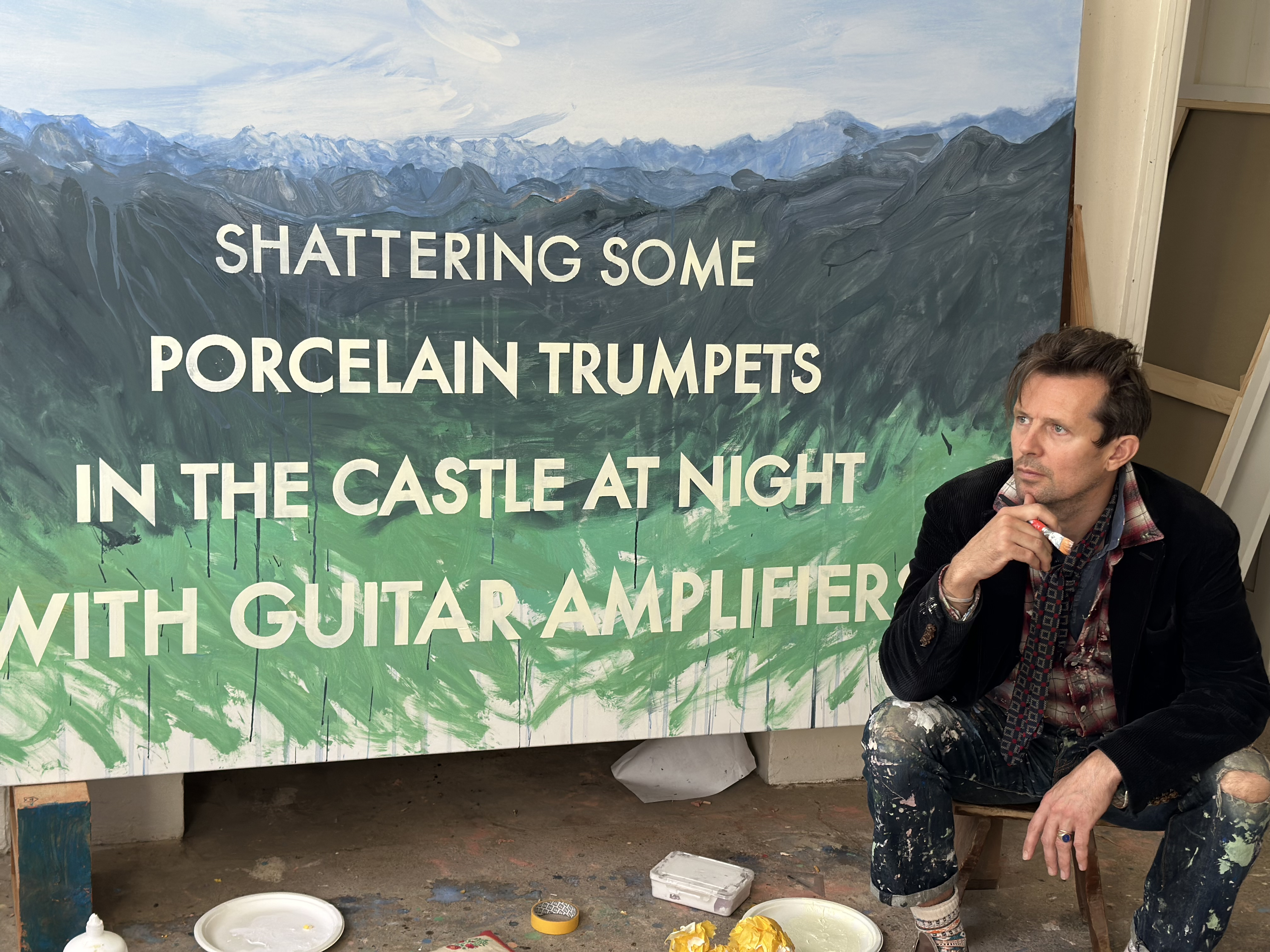
Artist Robert Montgomery

Robert Montgomery (born 7 July 1972) is a Scottish poet, artist, and sculptor based in London, known for creating site-specific installations that combine light and text. He is also recognized for his "fire poems," where poetic messages are displayed using flames. Montgomery’s work is influenced by a "melancholic post-Situationist" tradition, and he often uses public spaces to create art that challenges conventional perceptions.

== Early career and education ==
Robert Montgomery was born in Chapelhall, North Lanarkshire, Scotland, in 1972, to David and Janette Montgomery. At 16, he was accepted to study fine art at the Edinburgh College of Art.

Montgomery earned a first undergraduate degree in painting and later obtained a Master of Fine Arts. While still students, he and John Ayscough applied for a grant from the Scottish Arts Council for their project, Aerial '94. They were awarded £40,000, but the grant was nearly withdrawn because the grant was not intended for students. Andrew Nairne (then Visual Director at the Scottish Arts Council) supported the aspiring artists, and the project proceeded with the help of the grant.

From 1995 to 1997, Montgomery was the Core Program Artist in Residence at the Museum of Fine Arts in Houston Texas.

Early in his career, Montgomery experimented with minimalist sculptures with elaborate poetic titles. He eventually shifted his focus to combining verbal and visual elements. Initially, Montgomery wrote poems on buses and walls with spray paint, aiming to emulate graffiti artists who made the city a "free space of diverse voices."

In 1999, Montgomery moved to London, where he wrote for the magazine Dazed & Confused.

== Work ==
Often installed without authorisation in industrial and urban locations, Montgomery's installations explore themes of power, love, and human kindness through sparse language and dramatic visuals. These text-based conceptual pieces are described as recycled sunlight pieces, billboard pieces, fire poems, woodcut panels, and watercolors. Montgomery's poetry offers commentary on contemporary life and affirms his personal and philosophical beliefs, which he describes as Situationist.

Montgomery's black and white poems pasted on London billboards have occasionally led to encounters with the police. He was detained in a police van after posting his poem for William Blake on a billboard in Bethnal Green.

Montgomery participated in the 2011 Venice Biennale and represented the UK at the first biennale in India, The Kochi-Muziris Biennale, in December 2012. He has exhibited in Europe and Asia, including outdoor light installations at the former US Air Force base at Tempelhof. The first monograph of his work was published by Distanz, Berlin, in 2015.

=== Process and inspiration ===
Montgomery's initial inspirations included East London graffiti artists, the poetry of Philip Larkin, the philosophy of Guy Debord, and the French student protesters of the May 1968. He became interested in the Situationist tradition while following the writing of Roland Barthes and Jean Baudrillard during his time at Edinburgh College of Art. Montgomery also cites lyricists as important influences, as his poems often mirror the tone and structure commonly used by songwriters. Montgomery describes his creative process as random and unpredictable: "You quite often get stuff at like 2 o'clock in the morning and kind of see what you've got. I quite like that process". In selecting a platform for his art, Montgomery was inspired by Jenny Holzer and Felix Gonzalez-Torres' use of billboard space.

=== Publications ===
Robert Montgomery's Echos of Voices in the High Towers was published by Mono Kultur in 2012. The A2-sized book folds out to A1 and is divided into three parts, serving as a comprehensive publication of Montgomery's work.

Upon arriving in London, Montgomery became involved in Dazed & Confused, a monthly style magazine where he is still an associate publisher.

== Exhibitions ==
Montgomery's work has been featured in various galleries, publications, and public locations. His work is part of the permanent collections at the Museum of Fine Arts in Houston Texas and the Anna Jill Lupertz Gallery in Berlin.

Solo Exhibitions
2014	Robert Montgomery, Anna Jill Lupertz Gallery, Berlin, Germany
	The Office gallery, Nicosia, Cyprus
	Piles of Dirt and Glass You Walk Upon, Galerie Colette, Paris, France
2013	Robert Montgomery, C24 Gallery, New York, NY, USA
	City is Wilder, Installation at Kater Holzig, Anna Jil Lüpertz Gallery, Berlin, Germany
	Echoes of Voices in the High Towers, Galerie Nuke, Paris, France
2012	Robert Montgomery: Echoes of Voices in the High Towers Part 2, Neue Berliner Räume, Stattbad Wedding, and billboard sites, Berlin Germany
	Robert Montgomery: Echoes of Voices in the High Towers Part 2, Neue Berliner Räume, site of old Tempelhof Airport and billboard sites, Berlin, Germany
	Whenever An Angel, Galerie Analix-Forever, Geneva, Switzerland
	It Turned Out This Way Cos You Dreamed It This Way, KK Outlet and billboard sites London, United Kingdom
2011	Fire of Each Other, Galerie Nuke, Paris, France
2009	Emotional Emergency, Analix Forever Gallery, Geneva, Switzerland
2008	Derniers Jours: May 68/May 8, Galerie Nuke, Paris, France

== Personal life ==
Montgomery lives in London with his wife, Greta Bellamacina, an actress, poet, and filmmaker. They have three children.
