= Giorgio de Chirico Art Centre =

Museum in Volos, Greece

Coordinates: 39.3630175°N 22.9428071°E

- Κέντρο Τέχνης «Τζόρτζιο ντε Κίρικο»
- Location: Volos, Magnesia, Greece
- Type: Art museum / Art centre

The Giorgio de Chirico Art Centre (Greek: Κέντρο Τέχνης «Τζόρτζιο ντε Κίρικο») is an art centre/museum in a three-story building in Volos, Magnesia, Greece. It is named for internationally famous Italian artist Giorgio de Chirico, who was born to Italian parents in Volos on July 10, 1888.

The first floor of the museum is a municipal museum with more than 400 works. The second and third floors house the Alekos K. Damtsas Museum (Greek: Μουσείο Αλέκου Κ. Δάμτσα) which holds a collection donated by Alexandros K. Damtsas, a local businessman. It consists of more than 500 paintings by Greek artists of the 19th and early 20th century, and engravings, maps, and documents about Volos, and artworks by locals. According to a Pelion-region travel website, it is one of 20 "sites worth seeing" in the region.
