= Alex Breaux =

American film, stage and television actor

- Born: 1985 or 1986 (age 40–41); Richmond, Virginia, U.S.
- Education: Harvard University
- Occupations: Film, stage and television actor
- Years active: 2014–present

Alex Breaux (born 1985/1986) is an American film, stage and television actor. He is best known for playing the recurring role of Lieutenant Robert Akers in the final season of the American mystery television series Stranger Things.

== Life and career ==
Breaux was born in Richmond, Virginia. He attended Campolindo High School in Moraga, California, before attending Harvard University where he majored in economics. He began his stage career in 2014, appearing in the stage play The Real Thing, playing Brodie. During his stage career, he played as Olympic swimmer Ray in the New York Theatre Workshop stage play Red Speedo, and as Dr. Martin Brenner in the stage play Stranger Things: The First Shadow. He then began his screen career in 2016, appearing in the film Josephine. In the same year, he appeared in the film Katie Says Goodbye, and in the CBS legal drama television series Bull.

Later in his career, Breaux guest-starred in television programs including Waco: The Aftermath (as domestic terrorist Timothy McVeigh), The Blacklist, Law & Order: Special Victims Unit, The Equalizer, Joe Pickett and Blue Bloods, and played the recurring role of Lieutenant Robert Akers in the Netflix final season of the American mystery television series Stranger Things, and as Dax in the second season of the Apple TV+ science fiction drama television series See. He also appeared in films such as Depraved, Minor Premise, Bushwick, Trick and Foxhole.

== Filmography ==
=== Film ===
Year	Title	Role
2016	Josephine	Lamdon Purdy
2016	Katie Says Goodbye	Steve
2017	Bushwick	Lt. Brewer
2017	I Didn't Come Here to Make Love	Alex
2019	Depraved	Adam
2019	Hustlers	Stockbroker
2019	Union Bridge	Nick Taylor
2019	Trick	Len
2020	Lapsis	Alpine
2020	Minor Premise	Timmy Fitzgerald
2021	Foxhole	The German
2023	The Dead Don't Hurt	Ed Wilkins
2023	Blackout	Adam
2023	Before the World Set on Fire	Parker
2024	Eco Village	Jake
2026	Trauma or, Monsters All	Adam

=== Television ===
Year	Title	Role	Notes	Ref.
2016	Bull	Rob McKellen	Episode: "Unambiguous"	
2018	FBI	Nick Salerno	Episode: "Cops and Robbers"	
2019	The Blacklist	Reggie Deeks	Episode: "The Pharmacist (No. 124)"	
2019	When They See Us	Tim Clements	2 episodes	
2019	Blue Bloods	Eli Harris	Episode: "Behind the Smile"	
2021	Law & Order: Special Victims Unit	Jacob Peters	Episode: "Return of the Prodigal Son"	
2021	See	Dax	4 episodes	
2022	The Equalizer	Frank Mitchell	Episode: "Chinatown"	
2023	Waco: The Aftermath	Timothy McVeigh	5 episodes	
2023	Joe Pickett	Camish Grimmengruber	5 episodes	
2025	American Primeval	Wild Bill Hickman	5 episodes	
2025	Stranger Things	Lieutenant Robert Akers	7 episodes	
TBA	Bishop †	Louis Davies	TBD episodes	

Key
†	Denotes television productions that have not yet been released
