= Minor Premise (film) =

2020 film by Eric Schultz

- Official release poster
- Directed by: Eric Schultz
- Written by: Justin Moretto; Eric Schultz; Thomas Torrey
- Produced by: Justin Moretto; Ross O'Connor; Eric Schultz; Nicolai Schwarzkopf; Thomas Torrey
- Starring: Sathya Sridharan; Paton Ashbrook; Dana Ashbrook
- Cinematography: Justin Derry
- Edited by: James Codoyannis; Christopher Radcliffe
- Music by: Gavin Brivik
- Production company: Bad Theology
- Distributed by: Utopia
- Release date: August 29, 2020 (Fantasia Festival)
- Running time: 94 minutes
- Country: United States
- Language: English

Minor Premise is a 2020 American science-fiction thriller film directed by Eric Schultz in his directorial debut. He co-wrote the script alongside Justin Moretto and Thomas Torrey. The film stars Sathya Sridharan, Paton Ashbrook, and Dana Ashbrook.

The film premiered at the Fantasia International Film Festival on August 29, 2020.

== Synopsis ==
"Attempting to surpass his father's legacy, a reclusive neuroscientist becomes entangled in his own experiment, pitting ten fragments of his consciousness against each other".

== Cast ==
- Sathya Sridharan as Ethan
- Paton Ashbrook as Alli
- Dana Ashbrook as Malcolm
- Purva Bedi as Maggie
- Alex Breau as Timmy Fitzgerald
- E.J. Carroll as Dr. Joseph Lang
- Karron Graves as Lauren

== Production ==
The film was shot in the United States.

== Release ==
Minor Premise had its world premiere at the Fantasia International Film Festival on August 29, 2020, and it was released on VOD on December 4, 2020 by Utopia.

== Reception ==
=== Critical response ===
On review aggregator Rotten Tomatoes, the film holds an approval rating of 91% based on 46 critic reviews, with an average rating of 7.2/10. The site's critical consensus reads, "Minor Premise offers major enjoyment for sci-fi fans in search of an intelligent, grounded entry in the genre." On Metacritic, the film has a weighted average score of 66 out of 100, based on 6 critics, indicating "generally favorable reviews". Alan Zilberman of Washington City Paper reviewed the film positively, saying "With its stirring lead performance and ticking clock, this modest thriller is a major accomplishment." Daily Dead's Heather Wixson scored the film 4/5, stating "Minor Premise demonstrates an adept ability to marry smart, intellectually-driven storytelling that also has a bit of an emotional wallop to it as well."
