= Samantha Chapman =

British makeup artist (born 1977)

- Born: 23 August 1977 (age 49); Basildon, England
- Education: College of West Anglia
- Occupations: Makeup artist; YouTuber
- Children: 2
- Relatives: Jim Chapman (brother); Nicola Haste (sister)

Samantha Chapman is an English makeup artist based in London and Norwich. Sam is married to writer director, Ryan Andrews.

== Background ==
Chapman attended the College of West Anglia, taking a two-year BTEC in Make-up and Hairdressing tutored by Louise Young. In addition to her work as a freelance make-up artist, she runs make-up courses with her sister, Nicola Haste. In October 2008, Samantha started a channel on YouTube under the name of 'Pixiwoo' on which she and her sister post hair and make-up tutorials from Avant Garde to Natural looks as well as reviews on various beauty products. She is a mother of two young girls with her former partner Danny. She lives in Norwich, England. She has two brothers, Jim, who runs a YouTube channel under the name Jim Chapman, and John, who co-runs The Lean Machines YouTube channel.

== Career ==
Chapman has been a make-up artist for more than a decade. She was part of the UK M·A·C Pro team, often travelling for shows such as the Milan and Paris fashion weeks. Chapman has also worked with celebrities such as Paul McCartney, Peaches Geldof, Ashley Tisdale, Charlotte Church, Myleene Klass, Liberty Ross, Val Kilmer, Zac Efron, Neve Campbell, and Lily Cole.

== Real Techniques ==
Chapman was contacted by Paris Presents (the makers of Eco Tools and other beauty products) to develop an affordable make-up brush line called "Real Techniques." The brushes are cruelty-free, made of synthetic Taklon and not tested on animals. Each brush head is hand-cut and the brush collection works with a wide variety of make-up products from powders to creams and liquids.

The brushes have won awards from Xposé, CoolBrands, Allure and Influenser for the standard of their brushes.

== YouTube ==
Pixiwoo

YouTube information
- Channel: THIS CHANNEL IS NOT ACTIVE
- Years active: 2007–2020
- Genre: Beauty and makeup
- Subscribers: 2.12 million
- Views: 326.02 million
- Last updated: 5 October 2020

=== Pixiwoo ===
In October 2008, Sam Chapman began producing make-up tutorials on YouTube under the name, Pixiwoo. Her sister, Nicola, joined her soon after. Together, they have produced over five hundred videos for this channel. The videos include tutorials and reviews of various beauty products. The Chapman sisters are also currently running five-day make-up courses from their Norwich make-up studio. In 2020, Sam announced her retirement from the beauty community and creating content on any platforms as a job. The Pixiwoo YouTube channel no longer exists.

=== PixiwooMadness ===
PixiwooMadness

YouTube information
- Channel: PixiwooMadness
- Years active: 2010
- Genres: Beauty and makeup; vlogs; behind the scenes
- Subscribers: 307 thousand
- Views: 26.64 million
- Last updated: 5 October 2020

The Chapman sisters created a separate channel named 'Pixiwoo Madness' to which they upload various videos that they did not want on their main channel. The videos on this channel also include a few make-up tutorials, most of which were developed for Avon.

=== RealTechniques ===
RealTechniques

YouTube information
- Channel: realtechniques
- Years active: 2011–present
- Genre: Beauty and makeup
- Subscribers: 317 thousand
- Views: 29.82 million
- Last updated: 5 October 2020

Chapman began another channel specifically to promote and provide information concerning her Real Techniques brush line. On this channel, she demonstrates how to use each brush and how to create various looks with the brushes. This Channel helps viewers to create and achieve the look using the Real Technique brush line. At the end of 2020, The Chapman sisters parted ways from the Real Techniques brand.
