= The Office gallery =

Coordinates: 35.1741°N 33.3639°E

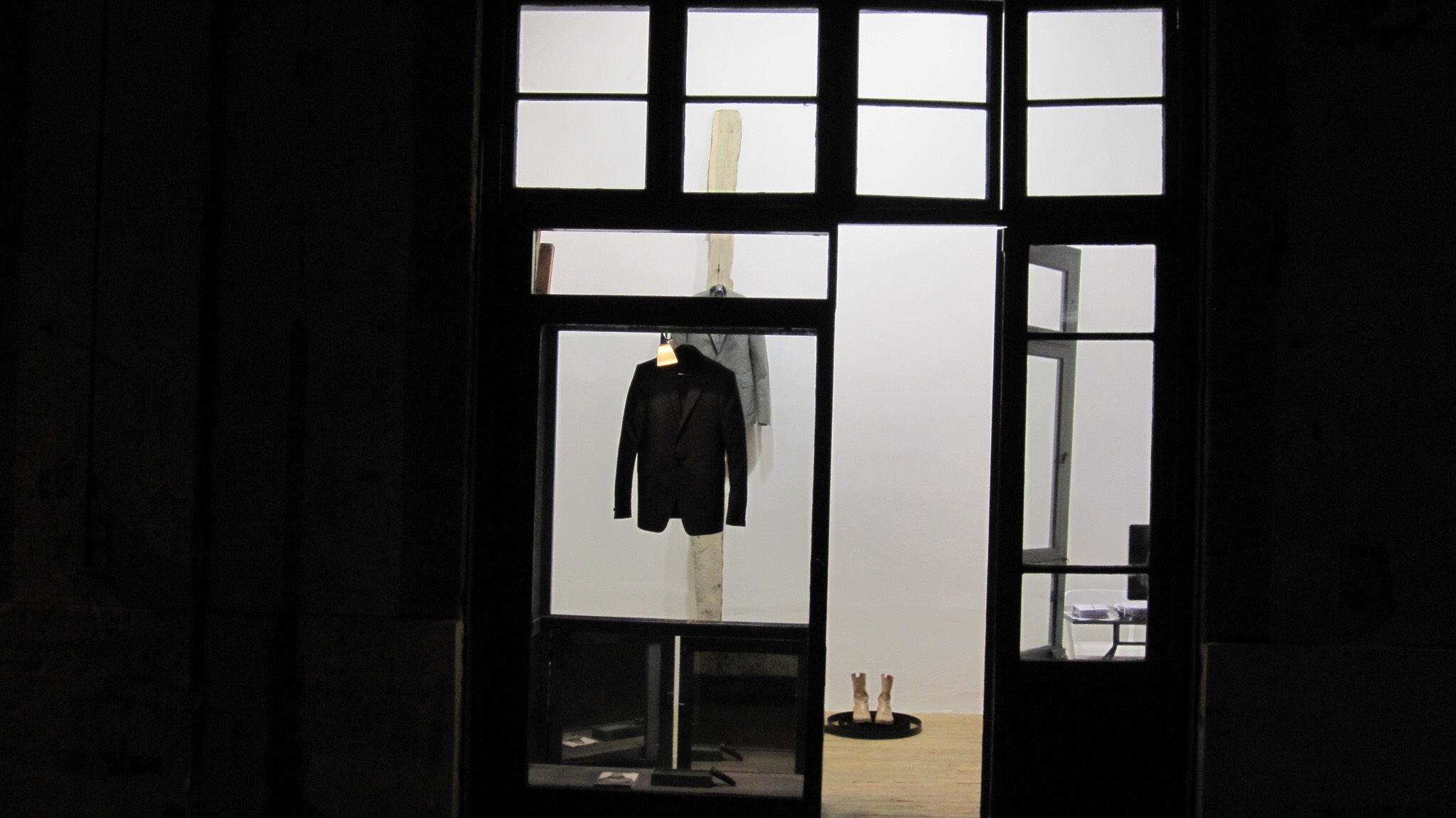
The Office gallery facade

The Office is a contemporary art gallery located in the centre of the old town of Nicosia in Cyprus near the boundaries of the Green Line, which makes Nicosia the last divided capital in Europe. The location is a stimulus for some artists who have exhibited their work in the Office gallery. It was founded in 2009 by the Greek Anastasios Gkekas.

To date the gallery has mounted over 20 exhibitions by both European and non-European artists. In 2015 and 2016 the gallery, along with solo shows, mounted two group shows with works by local and international artists. The 2015 show titled "Investment Opportunities" consisted solely of works from the gallery's collection, and the 2016 show "To Express the Feelings of a Chair When We Sit on it" included works that were loaned for the purposes of this exhibition, accompanied by pieces from the gallery's collection.

== Art Brussels ==
In 2015, the Office gallery participated in the Art Brussels 2015 international art fair, presenting works by the Scottish artist Robert Montgomery and the Greek artist Dimitris Merantzas, entitled "Proof against the obtainment of new artwork".

== Exhibitions ==
=== Local exhibitions ===
- IN GIRUM IMUS NOCTE ET COSUMIMUR IGNI, Group show: Nazgol Ansarinia, Christos Bokoros, Adam Brooberg & Oliver Chanarin, Glaukos Koumides, Christos Kyriakides, Phanos Kyriakou, Dimitris Merantzas, Robert Montgomery, Cornelia Parker, Carol Christian Poell, November 2024 – February 2025
- A PLACE TO WASH YOUR HEART, Charlotte Ballesteros, October 2022 – January 2023
- NAPK - THR // NIC INTONATIONS, Nazgol Ansarinia, Phanos Kyriacou, December 2019, January 2020
- Α CLOUD PASSING OVER CAIRO, Glavkos Koumides (&) Phanos Kyriakou, Broomberg & Chanarin, May 2019
- ISOLATO-SPLENDIDO-MARGINALE, Mario Carbone, May–June 2018
- Giornata, the Office, 22 May 2017
- LOST IN TIME, Patrick Bernatchez, Screenings: April 10, May 10, June 8, 2017
- To Express the Feelings of a Chair When We Sit on it, Group Show: Nazgol Ansarinia, Michelangelo Antonioni, Francis Bacon, Deepti Barth, Christos Th. Bokoros, Mario Carbone, Broomberg & Chanarin, Laurie Franck, Asteris Gkekas, Apollo Glykas, Bernhard Hosa, Glavkos Koumides, Dimitris Merantzas, Carol Christian Poell, Oct 2016
- Hyperkinesia, Bernhard Hosa, Jun–Jul 2016
- Yond.Side.Fore.Hind., Harris Gkekas, 7 Mar 2016
- Horsetail Knickerbelt, Delgado Fuchs, Nov 2015
- Investment Opportunities, Group Show: Günter Brus, Nazgol Ansarinia, Charlotte Ballesteros, Pascal Bernier, Cali Thornhill Dewitt, Elizabeth Hoak-Doering, Masahisa Fukase, Yannis Gaitis, Kurt Hentschläger, Andreas Karayan, Glavkos Koumides, Robert Montgomery, Andreas Nicolaou, Nicholas Panayi, Carol Christian Poell, Francesca Woodman, Soteris Kallis, Diamantis Diamantopoulos, Sep–Oct 2015
- All Kingdoms smashed and buried in the sky, Robert Montgomery, Dec 2014 – Jan 2015
- Selbstverstrickung, Günter Brus, Jun 2014
- Transgression, Deepti Barth, Oct–Nov 2013
- Cluster, Kurt Hentschläger, May 2013
- Foundations and Remains, Polly Morgan, Apr–May 2013
- The Last Bride, Asteris Gkekas, Mar–Apr 2013
- ‘Οδός Ελευθερίας’, Christos Bokoros, Jun 2012
- Carthago Delenda Est, Nicolas Panayi, Oct 2011
- Scars are Like Flowers, Charlotte Ballesteros + Hubert Marot, 7 Jul 2011
- Apollon Glykas, Η Βιτρίνα, 20 Jun 2011
- Nicolas Panayi, Τα Πάθη, 18 Apr 2011
- Υποδήματα, Asteris Gkekas, Nov 2010
- Το ταξίδι ΙΙ, Andreas Nicolaou, Jun 2010
- Arrest, Nicolas Panayi, Nov 2009

=== International exhibitions ===
- Tradition in Revolt: The Avant-Garde According to Mario Carbone, First exhibition in France of photographer Mario Carbone, the Office gallery Paris September – November 2025
- VIMA Art fair, YOU ARE THE MEMORY THIS LAND IS DEVELOPING I, Christos Kyriakides, 16–18 May 2025
- Art Brussels, 25–27 Apr 2015

== Image Gallery ==
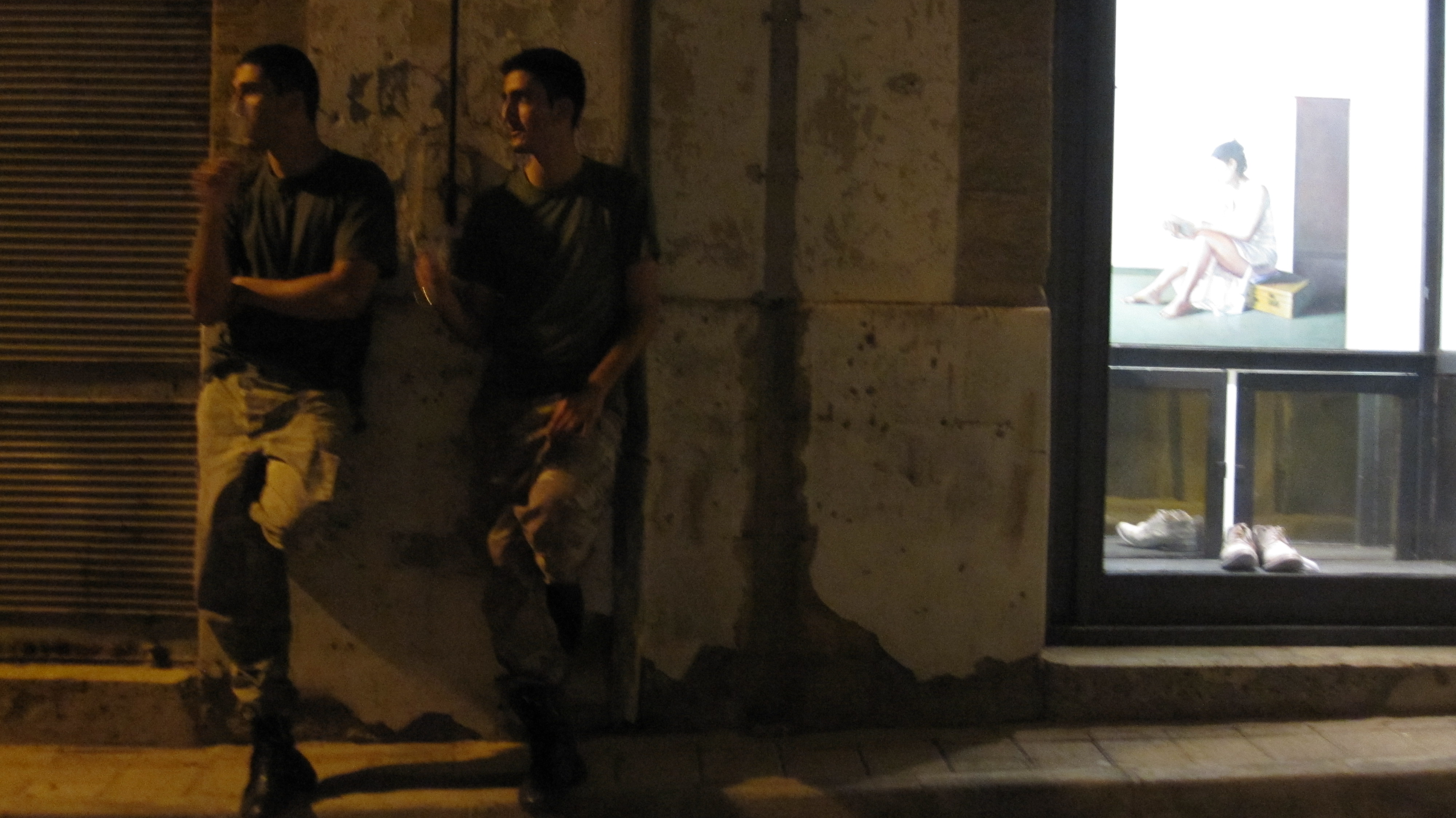
From the opening of Το ταξίδι ΙΙ exhibition by Andreas Nicolaou at the Office gallery, 2010

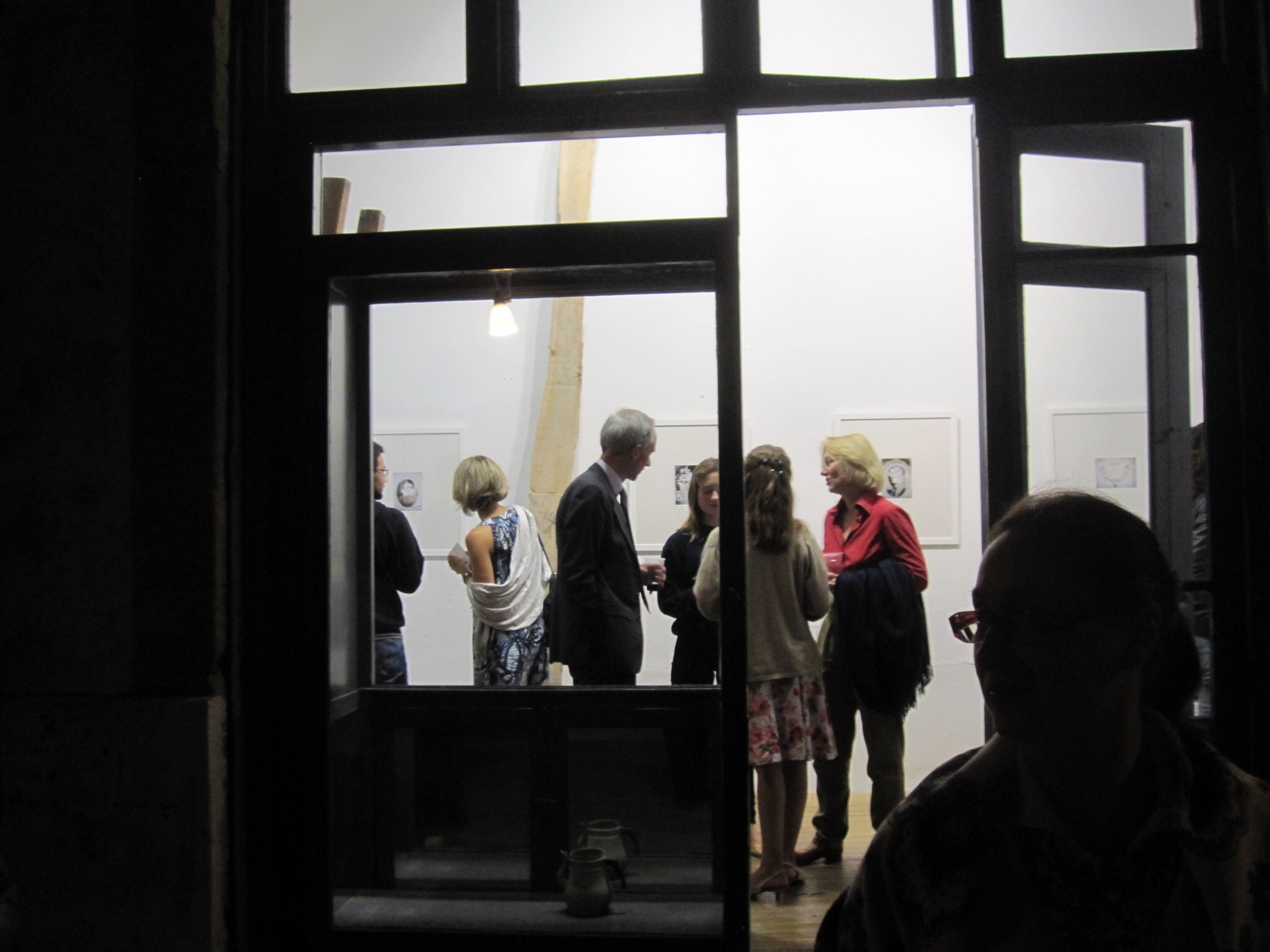
From the opening of the exhibition Carthago Delenda Est by Nicolas Panayi at the Office gallery, 2011

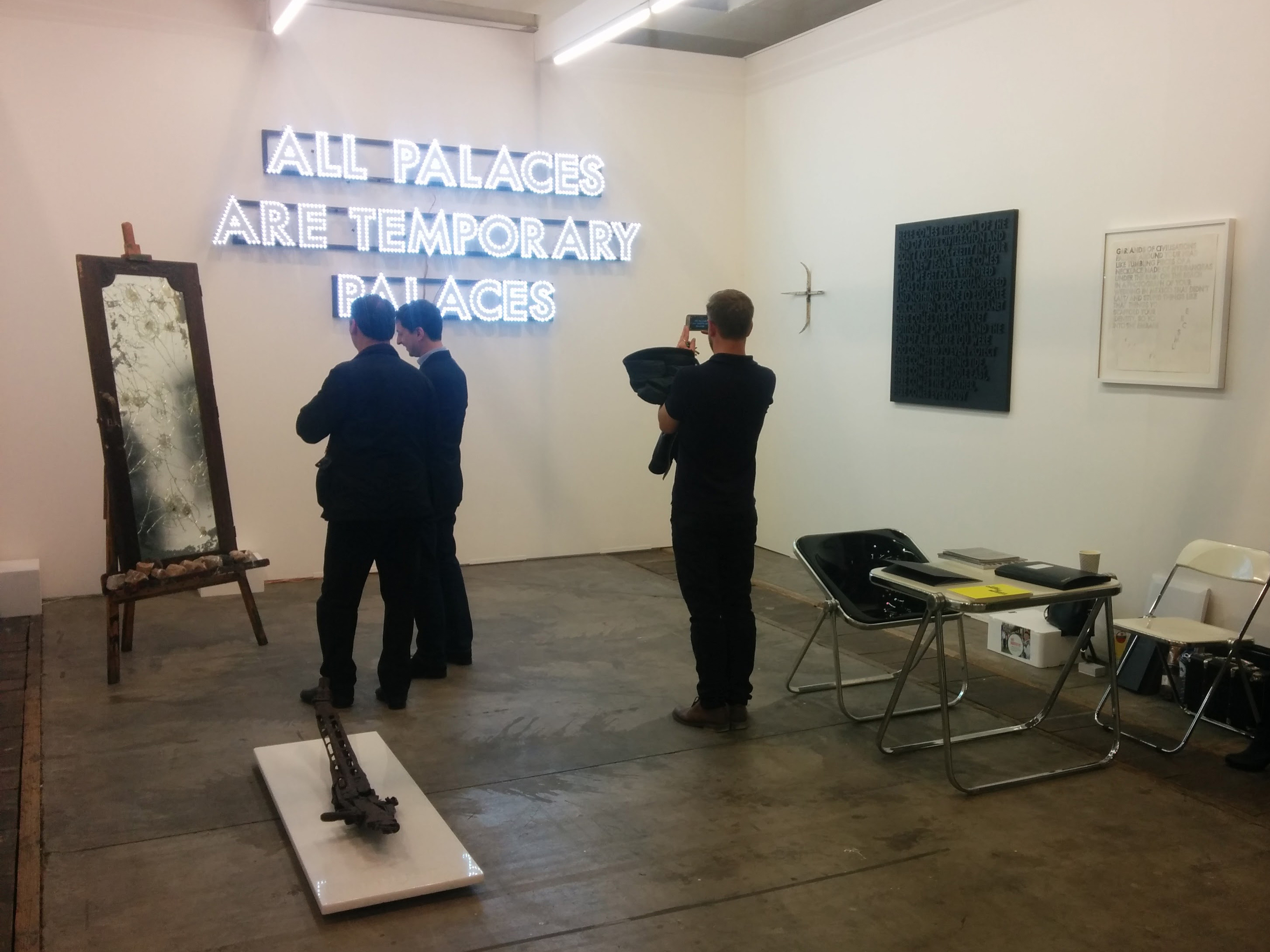
the Office gallery booth at Art Brussels, 2015
