= Commedia (2023 film) =

2023 film by Riccardo Vannuccini

- Film poster
- Directed by: Riccardo Vannuccini
- Written by: Riccardo Vannuccini
- Produced by: Artestudio
- Starring: Greta Bellamacina; Riccardo Vannuccini
- Cinematography: Manolo Cinti
- Edited by: Priscilla Muscat
- Music by: Pietro Freddi
- Production company: Artestudio
- Release date: 2023
- Running time: 79 minutes
- Country: Italy
- Language: Italian

Commedia is a 2023 Italian-English romantic drama film written and directed by Riccardo Vannunccini, stars Greta Bellamacina as the main lead alongside Vannunncini who plays Rocco. Commedia had its world premiere at the Caravaggio cinema in Rome, Italy on 23 January 2023

== Synopsis ==
Commedia is a harsh comedy which examines the thin borderline between creativity and madness set against a city with a long cinematic history that is, for the first time in a long time, shot in an entirely new way. The two main characters are patients in a mental hospital who want to make a movie. It is a touching exploration of where the borders of sanity and madness lie.

== Cast ==
- Greta Bellamacina as Irene
- Riccardo Vannuccini as Rocco
- Gabriele Guerra as Marco
- Maria Sandrelli as nurse
- Alessandra Piscopo as painter

== Release ==
Commedia had its world premiere at the Cinema Caravaggio in Rome, 23 January 2023.

== Sequel ==
A sequel, Things and Other Things, was released in 2025.
