= Jaclyn Bethany =

American actress

- Born: September 21, 1988 (age 36); Jackson, Mississippi, U.S.
- Education: Fordham University (BA); London Film School (MA); American Film Institute (MFA)
- Occupation(s): Director, Writer, Producer, Actress
- Years active: 2015–present

Jaclyn Bethany is an American director, writer, producer and actress. She is best known for her work on The Rehearsal, Indigo Valley and The Delta Girl.

== Life and career ==
Bethany was born in Jackson, Mississippi. She holds a BA in Acting from Fordham University and an MA in Screenwriting from the London Film School. Later, she also received a Master of Fine Arts degree from the AFI Conservatory. Her thesis film, The Delta Girl, starring Isabelle Fuhrman, Caitlin Carver and Ashley Bell, premiered at HollyShorts Film Festival.

Bethany's debut feature film was Indigo Valley, starring Rosie Day, Brandon Sklenar and Greta Bellamacina, based on one of her own short film of the same name. It was screened at the Garden State Film Festival. Her digital series The Rehearsal won the Daytime Emmy Award for Outstanding Performance by a Supporting Actress in a Digital Drama Series for Tina Benko. She is slated to direct the upcoming feature film Before the World Set on Fire, starring Brooke Bloom and Samuel H. Levine.

== Filmography ==
Year	Film	Director	Writer	Producer	Note
2015	Olivia Martha Ilse	No	Yes	Yes	Short Film
2016	Schoolgirls	Yes	Yes	Yes	Short Film
2016	Dear Annabel	No	Yes	Yes	Short Film
2016	Between Departures	No	Yes	Yes	Short Film
2016	Adamantine	Yes	No	No	Short Film
2017	The Last Birthday	Yes	Yes	Yes	Short Film
2017	Indigo Valley	Yes	Yes	Yes	Short Film
2017	You Are One of Them	Yes	Yes	No	Short Film
2017	Mojave	Yes	Yes	Yes	Short Film
2017	In: Transit	Yes	Yes	Yes	Short Film
2018	The Delta Girl	Yes	Yes	No	Short Film
2018	Sunday Tide	Yes	Yes	Yes	Short Film
2019	The Rehearsal	Yes	Yes	No	Digital series
2020	Indigo Valley	Yes	Yes	No	Feature Film
2021	Highway One	Yes	Yes	No	Feature Film
2023	Before the World Set on Fire	Yes	Yes	No	Feature Film
2025	In Transit	Yes	No	Yes	Feature film

As actress

- 2015 - Olivia Martha Ilse
- 2016 - The Devil's Dolls
- 2016 - Blindness
- 2016 - Miles
- 2016 - Resistance
- 2016 - Dear Annabel
- 2016 - Between Departures
- 2017 - Good Luck Marc
- 2017 - Indigo Valley
- 2017 - Mojave
- 2017 - In: Transit
- 2019 - Moth
- 2019 - The Rehearsal
- 2020 - Indigo Valley
- 2021 - mank
