= Butcher Billy =

Brazilian artist and graphic designer

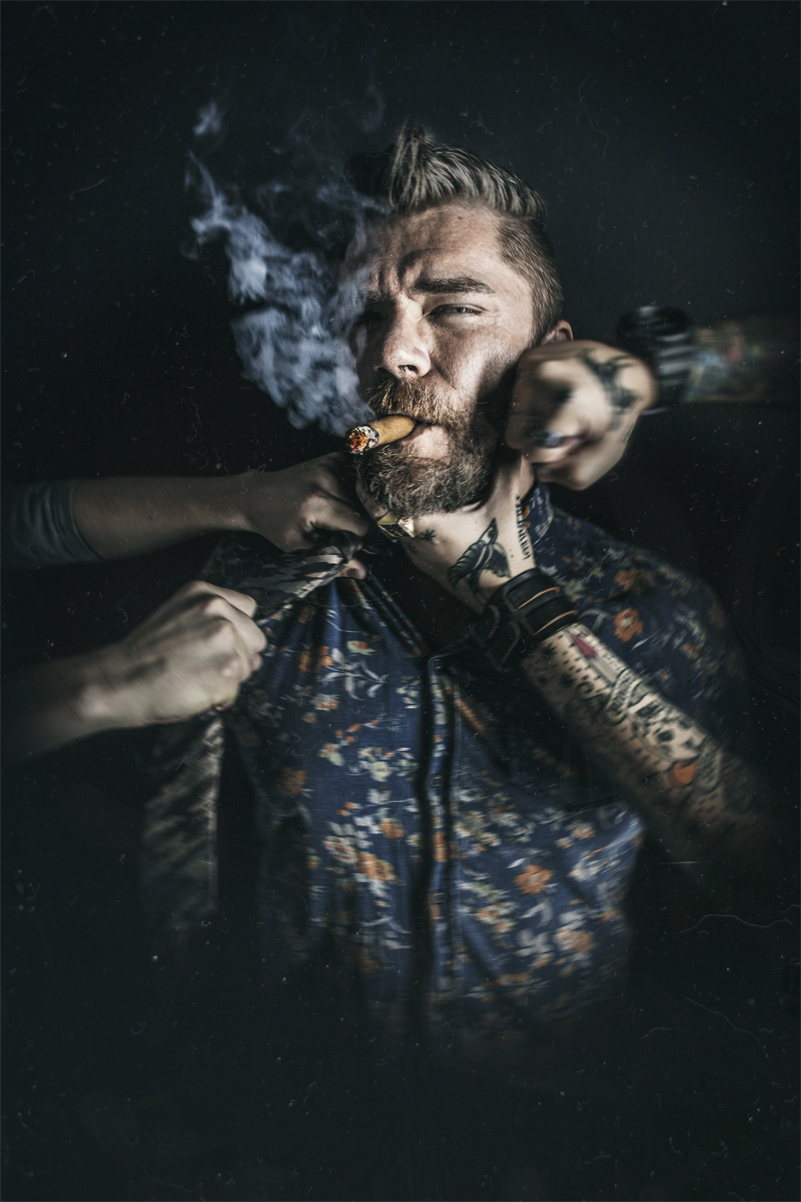
- Born: Billy Mariano da Luz; March 14, 1978 (age 48); Curitiba, Brazil
- Education: Graphic Design PUCPR
- Known for: Pop Art
- Notable work: The Post-Punk / New Wave Super Friends Series Tales From The Smith Comic Book Series Butcher Billy Changes Bowie Project
- Movement: Pop Art

Billy Mariano da Luz (born March 14, 1978 in Curitiba), known professionally as Butcher Billy, is a Brazilian artist and graphic designer known for his art pieces and illustration series based on the contemporary pop art movement. His work has a strong vintage comic book and street art influence while also making use of pop cultural references in music, cinema, art, literature, games, history and politics. Often crossing reality and fiction, his projects promote creative concepts that reference fictional characters with real life personalities such as musicians, artists, historical figures and politicians.

His work started going viral on the internet in 2012 via social media and since then he has been getting attention online and offline from newspapers, books, magazines and vehicles such as The Guardian/Observer, Rolling Stone, The Huffington Post, NME, Wired, Elle, Maxim, Vanity Fair, Yahoo!, and MTV.

His body of work has since been leading to exhibitions in contemporary art galleries in cities like London, San Francisco, Chicago, Miami, Lisbon and Dubai, and has attracted collaborations with companies such as ESPN, Michael Jordan, Foot Locker, E.Leclerc, British Gas, Billboard and Winsor & Newton.

In 2019, he started making cover for famous novels for Editora Aleph: A Clockwork Orange, Jurassic Park, Forrest Gump and Planet of the Apes. In 2020, he made covers for a box dedicated to science fiction by H. G. Wells for the publisher Pandorga.

== Works ==
=== The Post-Punk/New Wave Super Friends Project ===
In 2013 he released "The Post-Punk/New Wave Super Friends" series which discussed what makes a pop culture icon. The concept was to cross post-punk artists from the early 1980s with vintage comics superheroes. The series was widely spread through social media gaining online and offline media coverage from main websites and blogs around the world; also published in the book Comics Feeeever! Uncover The Power of Comics in Art and Design released by Victionary. In 2015 the series had a follow-up called All-New Super-Powered Post-Punk Marvels. This series was featured in the Art and Design section of the British newspaper The Guardian, and in the French art book collection ARTtitude, by publisher Plan9 Entertainment.

=== The Legion of Real Life Supervillains Project ===
In this series, released in 2014, Butcher Billy proposed an experiment where notorious dictators, psychopaths and murderers or even suspicious figures from real life are mashed up with comics supervillains - strangely related some way or the other with their counterparts. The project gained an article in the Arts & Culture section at The Huffington Post. This series caused debates in many countries for the use of controversial figures such as Adolf Hitler, Charles Manson, Chairman Mao Zedong, Osama bin Laden and Mark Zuckerberg. Billy is quoted on the project: "Some might say all art is a reflection of the times we live in. If back in the day comics and movies were pretty naive and faced only as pure escapism, today's fiction has to evoke reality to create something truly meaningful... and frightening."

=== The Superhero Media Crossover Project ===
In this series from 2012 Butcher Billy interlaces cinematography with storyboard, replacing live action scenes from contemporary super-hero blockbuster movies with cuts from the 1960s and 1970s comic books they were born from. The concept aims to explore how thin is the line that separates modern from classic, and pixels from ink. A successful superhero live action movie is mostly dependent on how the filmmakers have captured the exact character found on its two-dimensional, spandex-clad origin. The classic look and style in comics combined with some modern aspects like slight changes in costumes and storyline is a common technique found in making movies today. The project makes us realize how often movie makers rely on the format of classic comic books and graphic novels, making them easy to translate them on the screen.

=== Batman: The Nolan vs Burton Experiment Project ===
A design experiment in which Butcher Billy mashed together Tim Burton’s 1989 Batman and Christopher Nolan’s Dark Knight trilogy. By placing their differing elements in proximity, the images revealed the contrasts between the two similar yet disparate cinematic universes. By doing that the artist discussed the meaning of what is classic and timeless and the contemporary recycle of concepts in modern cinema.

=== Butcher Billy's "Tales From The Smith" Comic Book Series ===
This time the artist has taken goth rock icon Robert Smith of the band The Cure, and given him his own series of illustrations he's named "Tales From the Smith". Butcher Billy has once again opted to use the comic book genre as a guide for his new project. However instead of the usual superhero genre, the musician is portrayed in a series of retro style horror comic covers, and as an ode to his band, each of the horror comics in this series are named after a particular song. In addition, some of the art in this series are represented with homages to past iconic horror movies, such as Friday the 13th and Evil Dead. Billy is quoted on the series: "This frightening series of strange tales is an homage to the goth legend who truly taught us love and darkness". The collection has been published at Adobe Create, the Adobe online platform that features curated projects from leading creatives on the internet.

=== Tales from the Black Mirror ===
Butcher Billy took inspiration from the episodes of Black Mirror and created covers akin to a comics anthology about each. Once series creator Charlie Brooker discovered the images through Twitter, Billy was eventually hired to do artwork featured in the episodes themselves.

=== Stranger Things ===
Butcher Billy was hired by Netflix and the Duffer Brothers to work on social media content for Stranger Things. The artist was asked to create posters dedicated to each of the series's 42 episodes. Due to the huge success and increased demand from fans of the show, the designs were later used on physical products that could be purchased at the Netflix Shop. The posters were also adapted to billboards that were installed at the Sunset Boulevard in Los Angeles.
