= Amber Anderson =

English actress and model (born 1992)

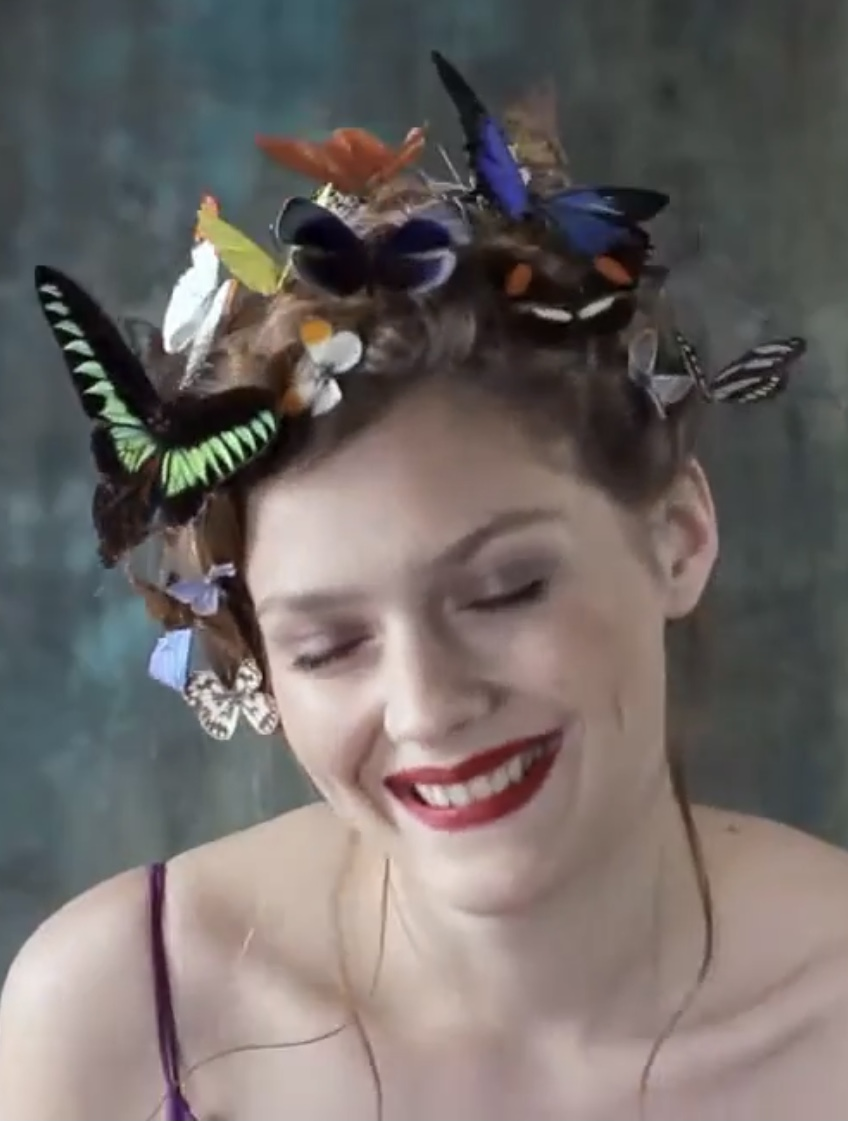
- Anderson for Kenzo Perfume
- Born: Amber Felicity Rose Anderson; 5 March 1992 (age 34); Shepton Mallet, Somerset, England
- Occupations: Actress, pianist and model
- Years active: 2011–present
- Spouse: Connor Swindells (m. 2024)

Amber Felicity Rose Anderson (born 5 March 1992) is a British actress, pianist and model. On television, she is known for her roles as Ciara Porter in the crime drama Strike (2017) and Diana Mitford in the sixth series of Peaky Blinders (2022), both on BBC One. Her films include We Are the Freaks (2013), White Lie (2019), and Emma (2020).

Anderson is a trained pianist and violinist, and began her career in modeling.

== Early life ==
Anderson was born in Shepton Mallet and spent her early childhood in Somerset and Wiltshire. Of Scottish descent on her father's side, she moved to Forres, north-east Scotland at the age of six. Her mother was concerned about the millennium bug and wanted to live more remotely.

Anderson attended primary school in Logie in addition to being Steiner-educated. She then studied piano and violin at Aberdeen City Music School to grade eight and nine respectively. At the age of 16, Anderson was awarded a double music and drama scholarship to Gordonstoun School, the first scholarship of its kind. She was scouted while shopping in Glasgow and left sixth form early to pursue a career in London.

== Career ==
Anderson has appeared in ads for brands such as Clarins, Burberry, Chanel and Kenzo. She has walked catwalk for Dior, Jean Paul Gaultier, Burberry, Hermes and Chanel.

She has worked with photographers such as Albert Watson, Mario Testino, Patrick Demarchelier, Nick Knight and Solve Sunsbo.

In 2021, it was announced Anderson would be joining the cast of Peaky Blinders for its sixth and final series, which aired in 2022. Her role was initially undisclosed and later revealed to be Lady Diana Mitford.

In May 2023, Anderson made her professional stage debut opposite Luke Newton in the revival of The Shape of Things at the Park Theatre. In 2024, Anderson launched the production company Just John Films with Rosie Day and Kate Phillips.

== Personal life ==
In 2017, Anderson wrote an Instagram post accusing Harvey Weinstein of behaving inappropriately and harassing her for a personal relationship to further her career when she was 20.

Since 2020, Anderson has been in a relationship with actor Connor Swindells, who also appeared in the film Emma. They married in the Scottish Highlands in October 2024.

== Filmography ==
=== Film ===
Year	Title	Role	Notes
2011	Your Highness	Maiden	
2011	Lotus Eaters	Suzi	
2013	We Are the Freaks	Elinor	
2014	The Riot Club	Lady Anne	
2018	In Darkness	Jane	
2019	White Lie	Jennifer Ellis	
2019	Skin Walker	Regine	
2020	Emma	Jane Fairfax	
2021	The Souvenir Part II	Amber	
2024	Tell That to the Winter Sea	Scarlet	
2025	California Schemin'	Amy	

=== Television ===
Year	Title	Role	Notes
2013	Black Mirror	Sara	Episode: "The Waldo Moment"
2016	Maigret's Dead Man	Francine	Television film
2017	Strike	Ciara Porter	Cast (series 1)
2022	Peaky Blinders	Lady Diana Mitford	Cast (series 6)

== Awards ==
In January 2020, Anderson received the Vancouver Film Critics Circle's award for Best Supporting Actress in a Canadian Film for her performance as Jennifer Ellis in White Lie.
