= 2011 Toronto International Film Festival =

Annual Canadian film festival

- Festival poster
- Opening film: From the Sky Down
- Closing film: Page Eight
- Location: Toronto, Ontario, Canada
- Awards: Where Do We Go Now? (People's Choice Award)
- Hosted by: Toronto International Film Festival Group
- No. of films: Over 200 feature films
- Festival date: September 8, 2011–September 18, 2011
- Language: English
- Website: tiff.net
- 2012 2010

The 36th annual Toronto International Film Festival (TIFF) was held in Toronto, Ontario, Canada, between September 8 and September 18, 2011. Buenos Aires, Argentina was selected to be showcased for the 2011 City to City programme. The opening film was From the Sky Down, a documentary film about the band U2, directed by Davis Guggenheim. Considerable media attention at the time focused on Madonna's behaviour during the festival.

== Awards ==
Award	Film	Director
People's Choice Award (Drama)	Where Do We Go Now?	Nadine Labaki
People's Choice Award (Drama), First Runner Up	Starbuck	Ken Scott
People's Choice Award (Drama), Second Runner Up	A Separation	Asghar Farhadi
People's Choice Award (Documentary)	The Island President	Jon Shenk
People's Choice Award (Documentary), First Runner Up	First Position	Bess Kargman
People's Choice Award (Documentary), Second Runner Up	Pearl Jam 20	Cameron Crowe
People's Choice Award (Midnight Madness)	The Raid	Gareth Evans
People's Choice Award (Midnight Madness), First Runner Up	You're Next	Adam Wingard
People's Choice Award (Midnight Madness), Second Runner Up	God Bless America	Bobcat Goldthwait
Best Canadian Feature Film	Monsieur Lazhar	Philippe Falardeau
Best Canadian First Feature Film	Citizen Gangster	Nathan Morlando
Best Canadian First Feature Film, Honorable Mention	Nuit #1	Anne Émond
Best Canadian Short Film	Doubles with Slight Pepper	Ian Harnarine
Best Canadian Short Film, Honorable Mention	No Words Came Down	Ryan Flowers, Lisa Pham
Best Canadian Short Film, Honorable Mention	Of Events (D'aléas)	Mathieu Tremblay
FIPRESCI Special Presentations	The First Man	Gianni Amelio
FIPRESCI Discovery	Avalon	Axel Petersén

== Programme ==
=== Gala Presentations ===
- Albert Nobbs by Rodrigo García
- The Awakening by Nick Murphy
- Beloved by Christophe Honoré
- Butter by Jim Field Smith
- A Dangerous Method by David Cronenberg
- From the Sky Down by Davis Guggenheim
- A Happy Event by Rémi Bezançon
- Hysteria by Tanya Wexler
- The Ides of March by George Clooney
- Killer Elite by Gary McKendry
- The Lady by Luc Besson
- Machine Gun Preacher by Marc Forster
- Moneyball by Bennett Miller
- Page Eight by David Hare
- Peace, Love and Misunderstanding by Bruce Beresford
- Starbuck by Ken Scott
- Take This Waltz by Sarah Polley
- Trespass by Joel Schumacher
- W.E. by Madonna
- Winnie by Darrell Roodt

=== Masters ===
- Almayer's Folly by Chantal Akerman
- Faust by Alexander Sokurov
- Hard Core Logo 2 by Bruce McDonald
- Le Havre by Aki Kaurismäki
- I Wish by Hirokazu Koreeda
- The Kid with a Bike by Dardenne brothers
- Once Upon a Time in Anatolia by Nuri Bilge Ceylan
- Outside Satan by Bruno Dumont
- Pina by Wim Wenders
- Restless by Gus Van Sant
- The Snows of Kilimanjaro by Robert Guédiguian
- This Is Not a Film by Mojtaba Mirtahmasb and Jafar Panahi
- The Turin Horse by Béla Tarr and Ágnes Hranitzky

=== Special Presentations ===
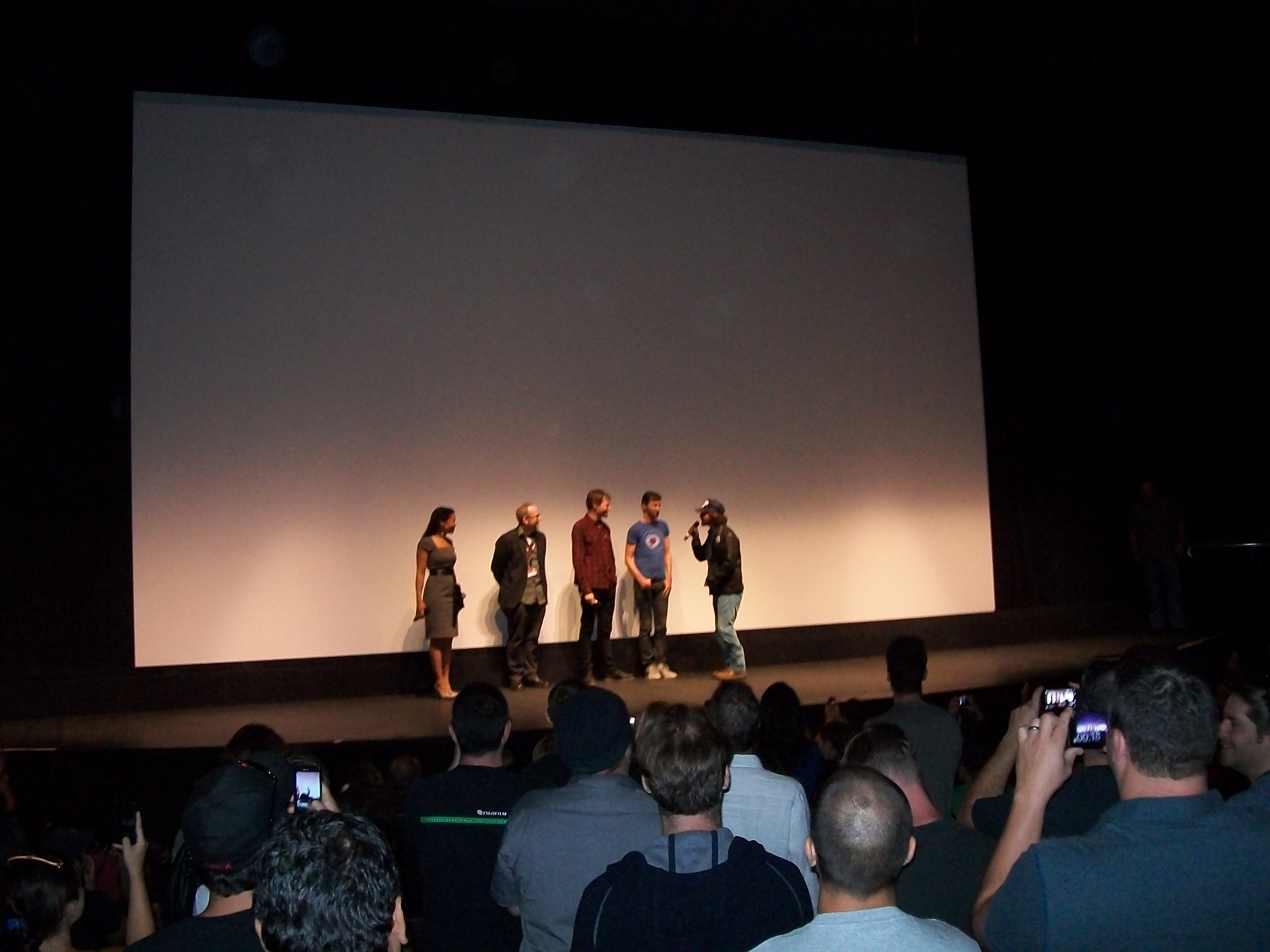
Q&A session after the second screening of Pearl Jam Twenty at the 2011 Toronto International Film Festival with the band's frontman Eddie Vedder (far right)

- 11 Flowers by Wang Xiaoshuai
- 360 by Fernando Meirelles
- 50/50 by Jonathan Levine
- Afghan Luke by Mike Clattenburg
- Americano by Mathieu Demy
- Anonymous by Roland Emmerich
- The Artist by Michel Hazanavicius
- Une vie meilleure by Cédric Kahn
- Breakaway by Robert Lieberman
- Burning Man by Jonathan Teplitzky
- Café de Flore by Jean-Marc Vallée
- The Cardboard Village by Ermanno Olmi
- Chicken with Plums by Vincent Paronnaud and Marjane Satrapi
- Coriolanus by Ralph Fiennes
- Countdown by Huh Jong-ho
- Damsels in Distress by Whit Stillman
- Dark Horse by Todd Solondz
- Death of a Superhero by Ian Fitzgibbon
- The Deep Blue Sea by Terence Davies
- The Descendants by Alexander Payne
- Drive by Nicolas Winding Refn
- Citizen Gangster by Nathan Morlando
- Elles by Małgorzata Szumowska
- The Eye of the Storm by Fred Schepisi
- The First Man by Gianni Amelio
- Friends with Kids by Jennifer Westfeldt
- Goon by Michael Dowse
- We Have a Pope by Nanni Moretti
- Headhunters by Morten Tyldum
- Hick by Derick Martini
- The Hunter by Daniel Nettheim
- In Darkness by Agnieszka Holland
- Intruders by Juan Carlos Fresnadillo
- Jeff Who Lives at Home by Jay Duplass and Mark Duplass
- Keyhole by Guy Maddin
- Killer Joe by William Friedkin
- Life Without Principle by Johnnie To
- Like Crazy by Drake Doremus
- Low Life by Nicolas Klotz
- Martha Marcy May Marlene by Sean Durkin
- Mausam by Pankaj Kapoor
- Melancholia by Lars von Trier
- Monsieur Lazhar by Philippe Falardeau
- The Moth Diaries by Mary Harron
- My Worst Nightmare by Anne Fontaine
- The Oranges by Julian Farino
- Pearl Jam Twenty by Cameron Crowe
- Rampart by Oren Moverman
- Rebellion by Mathieu Kassovitz
- Salmon Fishing in the Yemen by Lasse Hallström
- Shame by Steve McQueen
- A Simple Life by Ann Hui
- The Skin I Live In by Pedro Almodóvar
- Sleeping Beauty by Julia Leigh
- Take Shelter by Jeff Nichols
- 10 Years by Jamie Linden
- Terraferma by Emanuele Crialese
- A Burning Hot Summer (That Summer) by Philippe Garrel
- Trishna by Michael Winterbottom
- Twixt by Francis Ford Coppola
- Tyrannosaur by Paddy Considine
- Violet & Daisy by Geoffrey S. Fletcher
- Warriors of the Rainbow: Seediq Bale by Wei Te-sheng
- We Need to Talk About Kevin by Lynne Ramsay
- Where Do We Go Now? by Nadine Labaki
- The Woman in the Fifth by Paweł Pawlikowski
- Wuthering Heights by Andrea Arnold

=== Discovery ===
- Las acacias by Pablo Giorgelli
- Alois Nebel by Tomáš Luňák
- Among Us by Marco van Geffen
- Avalon by Axel Petersén
- Back to Stay by Milagros Mumenthaler
- Behold the Lamb by John McIlduff
- Breathing by Karl Markovics
- The Brooklyn Brothers Beat the Best by Ryan O'Nan
- Bunohan by Dain Said
- Cuchera by Joseph Israel Laban
- The Good Son by Zaida Bergroth
- Habibi by Susan Youssef
- Hanaan by Ruslan Pak
- Historias que so existem quando lembradas by Júlia Murat
- The Invader by Nicolas Provost
- J'aime regarder les filles by Fred Louf
- Lost in Paradise by Vũ Ngọc Đãng
- The Other Side of Sleep by Rebecca Daly
- Pariah by Dee Rees
- El circuito de Román by Sebastian Brahm
- Summer Games by Rolando Colla
- The Sword Identity by Xu Haofeng
- La brindille by Emmanuelle Millet
- Twilight Portrait by Angelina Nikonova
- Volcano by Rúnar Rúnarsson

=== Reel to Reel ===
- Arirang by Kim Ki-duk
- The Boy Who Was a King by Andrey Paounov
- Comic-Con Episode Four: A Fan's Hope by Morgan Spurlock
- Crazy Horse by Frederick Wiseman
- Dark Girls by D. Channsin Berry and Bill Duke
- Duch, Master of the Forges of Hell by Rithy Panh
- The Education of Auma Obama by Branwen Okpako
- Gerhard Richter - Painting by Corinna Belz
- Girl Model by David Redmon and Ashley Sabin
- I'm Carolyn Parker by Jonathan Demme
- In My Mother's Arms by Atea Al-Daradji and Mohamed Al-Daradji
- Into the Abyss by Werner Herzog
- Last Call at the Oasis by Jessica Yu
- The Last Dogs of Winter by Costa Botes
- The Last Gladiators by Alex Gibney
- Paradise Lost 3: Purgatory by Joe Berlinger and Bruce Sinofsky
- Paul Williams Still Alive by Stephen Kessler
- Pink Ribbons, Inc. by Léa Pool
- Samsara by Ron Fricke
- Sarah Palin: You Betcha! by Nick Broomfield and Joan Churchill
- The Story of Film: An Odyssey by Mark Cousins
- Surviving Progress by Mathieu Roy and Harold Crooks
- The Tall Man by Tony Krawitz
- Undefeated by Daniel Lindsay and T.J. Martin
- Urbanized by Gary Hustwit
- Whores' Glory by Michael Glawogger

=== Vanguard ===
- Carré blanc by Jean-Baptiste Léonetti
- Doppelgänger Paul by Kris Elgstrand and Dylan Akio Smith
- Generation P by Victor Ginzburg
- Headshot by Pen-Ek Ratanaruang
- Hidden Driveway by Sarah Goodman
- i am a good person/i am a bad person by Ingrid Veninger
- Love and Bruises by Lou Ye
- Oslo, August 31st by Joachim Trier
- Snowtown by Justin Kurzel
- The Year of the Tiger by Sebastián Lelio

=== TIFF Kids ===
- First Position by Bess Kargman
- The Flying Machine, by Martin Clapp, Geoff Lindsey and Dorota Kobiela
- A Letter to Momo by Hiroyuki Okiura
- A Monster in Paris by Bibo Bergeron

=== Mavericks ===
- Barrymore by Érik Canuel
- Deepa Mehta and Salman Rushdie
- In Conversation With...Francis Ford Coppola
- The Island President by Jon Shenk
- The Love We Make by Bradley Kaplan Albert Maysles
- Neil Young Journeys by Jonathan Demme
- Sony Pictures Classics 20th Anniversary: Michael Barker and Tom Bernard
- Tahrir 2011: The Good, the Bad, and the Politician by Tamer Ezzat, Ahmad Abdalla, Ayten Amin and Amr Salama
- Tilda Swinton

=== City to City: Buenos Aires ===
- Caprichosos de San Telmo by Alison Murray
- The Cat Vanishes by Carlos Sorín
- City to City Panel: Buenos Aires
- Crane World by Pablo Trapero
- Fatherland by Nicolás Prividera
- Invasión by Hugo Santiago
- A Mysterious World by Rodrigo Moreno
- Pompeya by Tamae Garateguy
- Las piedras by Román Cárdenas
- The Student by Santiago Mitre
- Vaquero by Juan Minujín

=== Contemporary World Cinema ===
- 388 Arletta Avenue by Randall Cole
- Always Brando by Ridha Behi
- Azhagarsamiyin Kuthirai by Suseenthiran
- Beauty by Oliver Hermanus
- Billy Bishop Goes to War by Barbara Willis Sweete
- Blood of My Blood by João Canijo
- Bonsai by Cristián Jiménez
- Color of the Ocean by Maggie Peren
- Death for Sale by Faouzi Bensaïdi
- Elena by Andrey Zvyagintsev
- Extraterrestrial by Nacho Vigalondo
- Footnote by Joseph Cedar
- The Forgiveness of Blood by Joshua Marston
- Free Men by Ismaël Ferroukhi
- From up on Poppy Hill by Gorō Miyazaki
- A Funny Man by Martin Zandvliet
- Future Lasts Forever by Özcan Alper
- Goodbye (Bé omid é didar) by Mohammad Rasoulof
- Goodbye First Love by Mia Hansen-Løve
- Guilty by Vincent Garenq
- Gypsy by Martin Šulík
- Heleno by José Henrique Fonseca
- Himizu by Sion Sono
- Hotel Swooni by Kaat Beels
- I'm Yours by Leonard Farlinger
- Islands by Stefano Chiantini
- Juan of the Dead by Alejandro Brugués
- Land of Oblivion by Michale Boganim
- Last Days in Jerusalem by Tawfik Abu Wael
- Last Winter by John Shank
- Lena by Christophe Van Rompaey
- Lipstikka by Jonathan Sagall
- Lucky by Avie Luthra
- Man on Ground by Akin Omotoso
- Michael by Markus Schleinzer
- Michael by Ribhu Dasgupta
- Miss Bala by Gerardo Naranjo
- Mr. Tree by Han Jie
- Omar Killed Me by Roschdy Zem
- Restoration by Yossi Madmoni
- Rose by Wojciech Smarzowski
- Rough Hands by Mohamed Asli
- A Separation by Asghar Farhadi
- The Silver Cliff by Karim Aïnouz
- Sisters & Brothers by Carl Bessai
- Sons of Norway by Jens Lien
- SuperClásico by Ole Christian Madsen
- Think of Me by Bryan Wizemann
- UFO in Her Eyes by Xiaolu Guo
- Union Square by Nancy Savoca
- Your Sister's Sister by Lynn Shelton

=== Canada First! ===
- Amy George by Yonah Lewis and Calvin Thomas
- Leave It on the Floor by Sheldon Larry
- Nuit 1 by Anne Émond
- The Odds by Simon Davidson
- The Patron Saints by Brian M. Cassidy and Melanie Shatzky
- Romeo Eleven (Roméo Onze) by Ivan Grbovic
- Wetlands (Marécages) by Guy Édoin

=== Short Cuts Canada ===
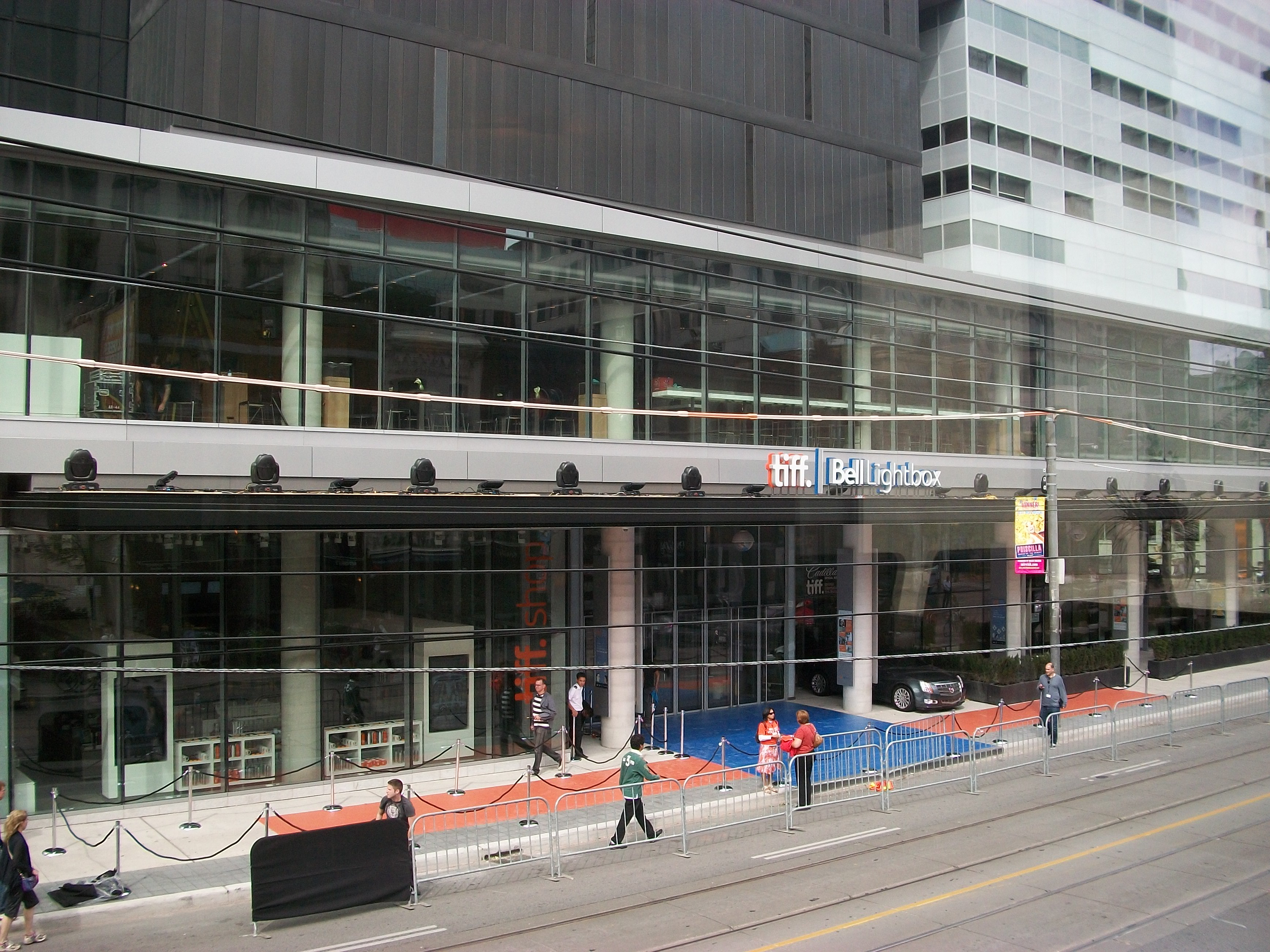
The TIFF Bell Lightbox had its formal opening on September 12, 2010, during the 2010 festival. This shot was taken the day before the opening.

- 4am by Janine Fung
- Acqua by Raha Shirazi
- Afternoon Tea by DJ Parmar
- Combustion by Renaud Hallée
- Derailments by Chelsea McMullan
- The Devil's Due by Alexander Gorelick
- Doubles with Slight Pepper by Ian Harnarine
- The Encounter by Nicholas Pye
- A Film Portrait on Reconstructing 12 Possibilities that Preceded the Disappearance of Zoe Dean Drum by Eduardo Menz
- The Fuse: Or How I Burned Simon Bolivar by Igor Drljača
- Heart of Rhyme by Cory Bowles
- Hope by Pedro Pires
- If I Can Fly by Yoakim Bélanger
- Issues by Enrico Colantoni and Hugh Dillon
- Lie Down and Die by Kyle Sanderson
- Little Theatres: Homage to the Mineral of Cabbage by Stephanie Dudley
- Mandeep by Darrin Klimek
- No Words Came Down by Ryan Flowers
- Of Events by Mathieu Tremblay
- One Night with You by Jeanne Leblanc
- Ora by Philippe Baylaucq
- The Paris Quintet in Practice Makes Perfect by Benjamin Schuetze
- Patch Town by Craig Goodwill
- Pathways by Dusty Mancinelli
- The Pedestrian Jar by Evan Morgan
- The Red Virgin by Sheila Pye
- A River in the Woods by Christian Sparkes
- La Ronde by Sophie Goyette
- Vent solaire by Ian Lagarde
- Sorry, Rabbi by Mark Slutsky
- Spirit of the Bluebird by Xstine Cook and Jesse Gouchey
- Les dimanches by Jean-Guillaume Bastien
- Surveillant by Yan Giroux
- Tabula Rasa by Matthew Rankin
- Throat Song by Miranda de Pencier
- Trotteur by Arnaud Brisebois and Francis Leclerc
- Up in Cottage Country by Simon Ennis
- Waning by Gina Haraszti
- We Ate the Children Last by Andrew Cividino
- The Weight of Emptiness (Le poids du vide) by Alain Fournier
- The Yodeling Farmer by Mike Maryniuk and John Scoles

=== Canada Open Vault ===
- Hard Core Logo by Bruce McDonald

=== Visions ===
- Alps by Yorgos Lanthimos
- Century of Birthing by Lav Diaz
- Cut by Amir Naderi
- Dreileben - Etwas Besseres als den Tod by Christian Petzold
- Dreileben - Komm mir nicht nach by Dominik Graf
- Dreileben - Eine Minute Dunkel by Christoph Hochhäusler
- Fable of the Fish by Adolfo Alix, Jr.
- House of Tolerance by Bertrand Bonello
- Kotoko by Shinya Tsukamoto
- The Last Christeros by Matias Meyer
- The Loneliest Planet by Julia Loktev
- Monsters Club by Toshiaki Toyoda
- The Mountain by Ghassan Salhab
- Mushrooms by Vimukthi Jayasundara
- Play by Ruben Östlund
- Porfirio by Alejandro Landes
- Random by Debbie Tucker Green
- The River Used to Be a Man by Jan Zabeil
- Swirl by Helvécio Marins Jr.
- This Side of Resurrection by Joaquim Sapinho

=== Wavelengths ===
- 349 (for Sol LeWitt) by Chris Kennedy
- 99 Clerkenwell Road by Sophie Michael
- Aberration of Light: Dark Chamber Disclosure by Sandra Gibson, Luis Recoder and Olivia Block
- American Colour by Joshua Bonnetta
- Ars colonia by Raya Martin
- Black Mirror at the National Gallery by Mark Lewis
- Bouquets 11-20 by Rose Lowder
- Chevelle by Kevin Jerome Everson
- Coorow-Latham Road by Blake Williams
- Edwin Parker by Tacita Dean
- Empire by Apichatpong Weerasethakul
- Found Cuban Mounts by Adriana Salazar Arroyo
- I Will Forget This Day by Alina Rudnitskaya
- Loutra/Baths by Nick Collins
- Optra Field VII-IX by T. Marie
- A Preface to Red by Jonathan Schwartz
- Resonance by Karen Johannesen
- The Return by Nathaniel Dorsky
- Sack Barrow by Ben Rivers
- Sailboat by Joyce Wieland
- Sea Series#10 by John Price
- Space is the Place by Eriko Sonoda
- Twenty Cigarettes by James Benning
- Untitled by Neïl Beloufa
- Young Pines by Ute Aurand

=== Future Projections ===
- Buffalo Days by Peter Lynch
- Light as a Feather, Stiff as a Board by Nicholas Pye and Sheila Pye
- Memories of Idaho by James Franco and Gus Van Sant
- Mr. Brainwash in Toronto by Mr. Brainwash
- Plot against Time by David Rokeby
- Road Movie by Elle Flanders and Tamira Sawatzky
- Sanctuary by Gregory Crewdson
- Slow Action by Ben Rivers
- Sunday by Duane Hopkins
- Time as Activity (Buenos Aires) by David Lamelas
- whiteonwhite:algorithmicnoir by Eve Sussman Rufus Corporation

=== Midnight Madness ===
- The Day by Doug Aarniokoski
- God Bless America by Bobcat Goldthwait
- The Incident by Alexandre Courtes
- Kill List by Ben Wheatley
- Livid by Julien Maury and Alexandre Bustillo
- Lovely Molly by Eduardo Sánchez
- The Raid by Gareth Evans
- Sleepless Night by Frédéric Jardin
- Smuggler by Katsuhito Ishii
- You're Next by Adam Wingard

== Canada's Top Ten ==
TIFF's annual Canada's Top Ten list, its national critics and festival programmers poll of the ten best feature and short films of the year, was released on December 7, 2011.

=== Feature films ===
- Café de Flore — Jean-Marc Vallée
- Citizen Gangster — Nathan Morlando
- A Dangerous Method — David Cronenberg
- Hobo With a Shotgun — Jason Eisener
- Keyhole — Guy Maddin
- Monsieur Lazhar — Philippe Falardeau
- The Salesman (Le Vendeur) — Sébastien Pilote
- Starbuck — Ken Scott
- Take This Waltz — Sarah Polley
- Wetlands (Marécages) — Guy Édoin

=== Short films ===
- Choke — Michelle Latimer
- Doubles with Slight Pepper — Ian Harnarine
- The Fuse: Or How I Burned Simon Bolivar — Igor Drljaca
- Hope — Pedro Pires
- No Words Came Down — Ryan Flowers, Lisa Pham
- Ora — Philippe Baylaucq
- Rhonda's Party — Ashley McKenzie
- La Ronde — Sophie Goyette
- Trotteur — Arnaud Brisebois, Francis Leclerc
- We Ate the Children Last — Andrew Cividino
