= Swirl =

Swirl may refer to:

- Swirl (band), an Australian indie rock band
- Swirl (film), a 2011 Brazilian film
- Swirl (organization), a multi-ethnic organization
- Sega Swirl, a 1999 puzzle game for the Sega Dreamcast
- Eddy (fluid dynamics), or swirl, a vortex in fluid dynamics
- Sources and sinks, vectors fields with zero divergence but non-zero curl

== See also ==
- Christopher Paul Neil (born 1975), convicted child molester also known as "Mr. Swirl"
- Tomoe, an abstract Japanese swirl-shape
