= Errol Sitahal =

Trinidad and Tobago actor

- Occupation: Actor
- Years active: 1995–present

Errol Sitahal is a Trinidadian actor who has had various roles in several Hollywood and Caribbean films. In 1995, he played a character named Ram Dass, the Indian manservant, in the film, A Little Princess. The same year he also appeared with Chris Farley and David Spade in a scene from the movie Tommy Boy, where he played the third "Yes" executive. In 2004, he played the stern Dr. Patel, father of Kumar (Kal Penn) and Kumar's older brother Saikat (Shaun Majumder), in Harold & Kumar Go to White Castle.

Sitahal has also acted on television. In 2005 he starred with Shaun Majumder in the short film Plain Brown Rapper, playing Majumder's character's father for a second time. He has had small parts, in one episode each, of the Canadian television series Side Effects, a medical drama, and in the American television series Relic Hunter.

In the intervening years, he has acted in numerous stage plays in Montreal, Toronto and the Caribbean. In early 2006, he starred in the Calypso musical The Brand New Lucky Diamond Horseshoe Club at Queen's Hall in Port of Spain, Trinidad. The play was written and directed by Tony Hall with music and lyrics by David Rudder.

In 2006, he played Samir, father of sons Sumesh and Raj, on the Canadian television series 11 Cameras.

In 2009, he plays Babaji, Indie Mehta's grandfather, in the Canadian TV series How To Be Indie. In definition of Babaji, he is an East Indian grandfather.

In 2024, he received a Special Jury Award for Best Supporting Actor at the Canadian Film Festival for his role as Ragbir in Ian Harnarine's Doubles. At the 2024 Third Horizon Film Festival in Miami he received the Lifetime achievement award for his contribution to film and television in the Caribbean and Canada and beyond.

== Filmography ==
Year	Title	Role	Notes
1995	Tommy Boy	Yes Executive	
1995	A Little Princess	Ram Dass	
1995	Side Effects	Mr. Legrand	Episode: Rust Proof
2001	Relic Hunter	Priest	Episode: The Reel Thing
2004	Harold & Kumar Go to White Castle	Dr. Patel	
2006	11 Cameras	Samir	1 episode
2008	Harold & Kumar Escape from Guantanamo Bay	Dr. Patel	
2009–2010	How To Be Indie	Prakash	10 episodes
2011	Doubles with Slight Pepper	Ragbir	
2023	Doubles	Ragbir	
