= Doubles with Slight Pepper =

- Directed by: Ian Harnarine
- Written by: Ian Harnarine
- Produced by: Ian Harnarine; Jason Harnarine; Ryan Silbert
- Starring: Errol Sitahal; Sanjiv Boodhu
- Cinematography: Spencer Kiernan
- Edited by: Brooke Swaney
- Music by: Kenyatta Beasley
- Release date: September 12, 2011 (TIFF)
- Running time: 16 minutes
- Country: Canada
- Language: English

Doubles with Slight Pepper is a Canadian short drama film, directed by Ian Harnarine and released in 2011.

The film stars Sanjiv Boodhu as Dhani, a young doubles vendor in Trinidad whose estranged father Ragbir (Errol Sitahal) returns from Toronto for the first time in many years to reveal that he is dying.

A full-length feature expansion of the film, Doubles, was announced as receiving funding from Telefilm Canada's Talent to Watch program in 2019, and premiered at the 2023 Atlantic International Film Festival.

== Accolades ==
The film won the Toronto International Film Festival Award for Best Canadian Short Film at the 2011 Toronto International Film Festival, and was named to TIFF's year-end Canada's Top Ten list.

In 2012, it won the Genie Award for Best Live Action Short Drama at the 32nd Genie Awards.
