= Michael Crummey =

Canadian poet and writer

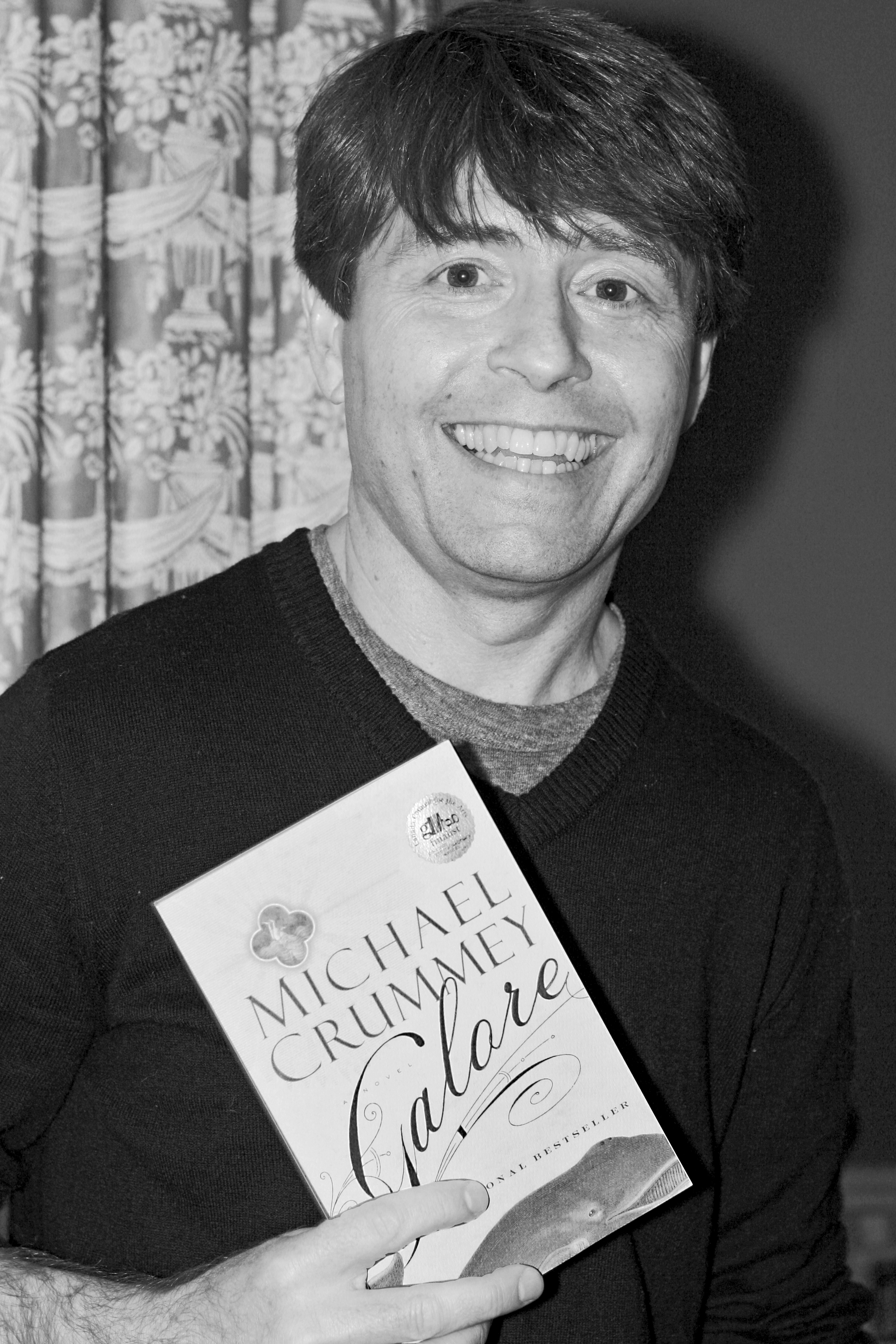
- Author Michael Crummey poses with a copy of his book, Galore, at a fundraiser for the Writers' Trust of Canada
- Born: Buchans, Newfoundland
- Education: Memorial University of Newfoundland
- Occupation: Writer
- Writing career
- Language: English
- Notable awards: Inaugural winner of RBC Bronwen Wallace Award for Emerging Writers, Thomas Head Raddall Award, Dublin Literary Award

Michael Crummey (born November 18, 1965) is a Canadian poet and a writer of historical fiction. His writing often draws on the history and landscape of Newfoundland and Labrador. He won the 2025 Dublin Literary Award.

== Life and education ==
Crummey was born in Buchans, Newfoundland. He grew up there and in Wabush, Labrador, where he moved with his family in the late 1970s.

He began to write poetry while studying at Memorial University in St. John's, where he won the university's Gregory J. Power Poetry Contest in 1986 and received a B.A. in English in 1987. He completed a M.A. at Queen's University in Kingston, Ontario, in 1988, later leaving the Ph.D. program to pursue his writing career.

He is married to Holly Hogan, a biologist and science writer.

== Career ==
In 1994, he became the first winner of the Bronwen Wallace Memorial Award for young unpublished writers. His first volume of poetry, Arguments with Gravity (1996), won the Writer's Alliance of Newfoundland and Labrador Book Award for Poetry. Hard Light (1998), his second collection, was nominated for the Milton Acorn People's Poetry Award in 1999.

Also in 1998, Crummey published a collection of short stories, Flesh and Blood, all of which take place in the fictional mining community of Black Rock, which strongly resembles Buchans. That year Crummey was nominated for the Journey Prize.

Crummey returned to St. John's in 2001. In that year, he published his debut novel, River Thieves. River Thieves details the contact and conflict between European settlers and the last of the Beothuk in the early 19th century, including the capture of Demasduit. The book became a Canadian bestseller, and won the Thomas Head Raddall Award, the Winterset Award for Excellence in Newfoundland Writing, and the Atlantic Independent Booksellers' Choice Award. It was also shortlisted for the Giller Prize, the Commonwealth Writers' Prize, the Books in Canada First Novel Award, and was long-listed for the International Dublin Literary Award.

Crummy's second novel, The Wreckage was published in 2005; the story of young Newfoundland soldier Wish Fury and his beloved Sadie Parsons during and after World War II, it was longlisted for the 2007 IMPAC Award. His third novel Galore, was published in 2009. Galore won a Commonwealth Writers Prize, and was shortlisted for the 2011 IMPAC Award.

Crummey continued to write prose and poetry with themes related to Newfoundland and Labrador. The poems and prose in Hard Light are inspired by the stories of his father and other relatives.

Crummey also researched and wrote the 2014 National Film Board of Canada multimedia short film 54 Hours on the 1914 Newfoundland Sealing Disaster, co-directed by Paton Francis and Bruce Alcock. His 2014 novel, Sweetland, was nominated for a Governor General's Award.

In 2018, his play Her Mark, set in Newfoundland, was staged in Strathcona.

His 2019 novel The Innocents was shortlisted for the 2019 Giller Prize, and for the Rogers Writers' Trust Fiction Prize.

In August 2020, Telefilm Canada announced it had selected the film adaptation of Sweetland as one of its English-language feature film projects to fund. Sweetland was directed by Christian Sparkes and filmed in Newfoundland, and premiered at the 2023 Atlantic International Film Festival.

In 2025, his novel The Adversary, a story of sibling rivalry set in 19th-century Newfoundland, won the Dublin Literary Award.

== Publications ==
=== Poetry ===
- Arguments With Gravity (Quarry Press, 1996)
- Hard Light (Brick Books, 1998)
- Emergency Roadside Assistance (Trout Lily Press, 2001)
- Salvage (McClelland & Stewart, 2002)
- Under the Keel (House of Anansi, 2013)
- Little Dogs: New and Selected Poems (House of Anansi, 2016)
- Passengers (House of Anansi, 2022)

=== Short stories ===
- Flesh and Blood (Beach Holme, 1998). Later expanded with five additional stories as Flesh and Blood: Selected Short Fiction (Doubleday Canada, 2003)

=== Novels ===
- River Thieves (Doubleday Canada, 2001)
- The Wreckage (Doubleday Canada, 2005)
- Galore (Doubleday Canada, 2009)
- Sweetland (Doubleday Canada, 2014)
- The Innocents (Doubleday Canada, 2019)
- The Adversary (Knopf Canada, 2023)

=== Non-fiction ===
- Newfoundland: Journey Into a Lost Nation (with photographer Greg Locke) (2004)
- Most of What Follows is True: Places Imagined and Real (University of Alberta Press, 2019)

=== In anthologies ===
- The Breakwater Book of Contemporary Newfoundland Poetry (Breakwater, 2013)
- The Harbrace Anthology of Poetry, 5th Edition (Nelson, 2012)
- The Penguin Book of Canadian Short Stories, selected and introduced by Jane Urquhart (Penguin Books, 2007)
- The New Canon: An Anthology of Canadian Poetry (Signal Editions, 2006)
- Canadian Short Stories (Penguin Books, 2004)
- Victory Meat (Doubleday Canada, 2003)
- Coastlines: The Poetry of Atlantic Canada, ed. Anne Compton, Laurence Hutchman, Ross Leckie and Robin McGrath (Goose Lane Editions, 2002)

=== Audiobook adaptations ===
- Hard Light: 32 Little Stories, narrated by Crummey & Ron Hynes (2003)
