= Doubles (food) =

Indo-Caribbean street food originating in Trinidad and Tobago

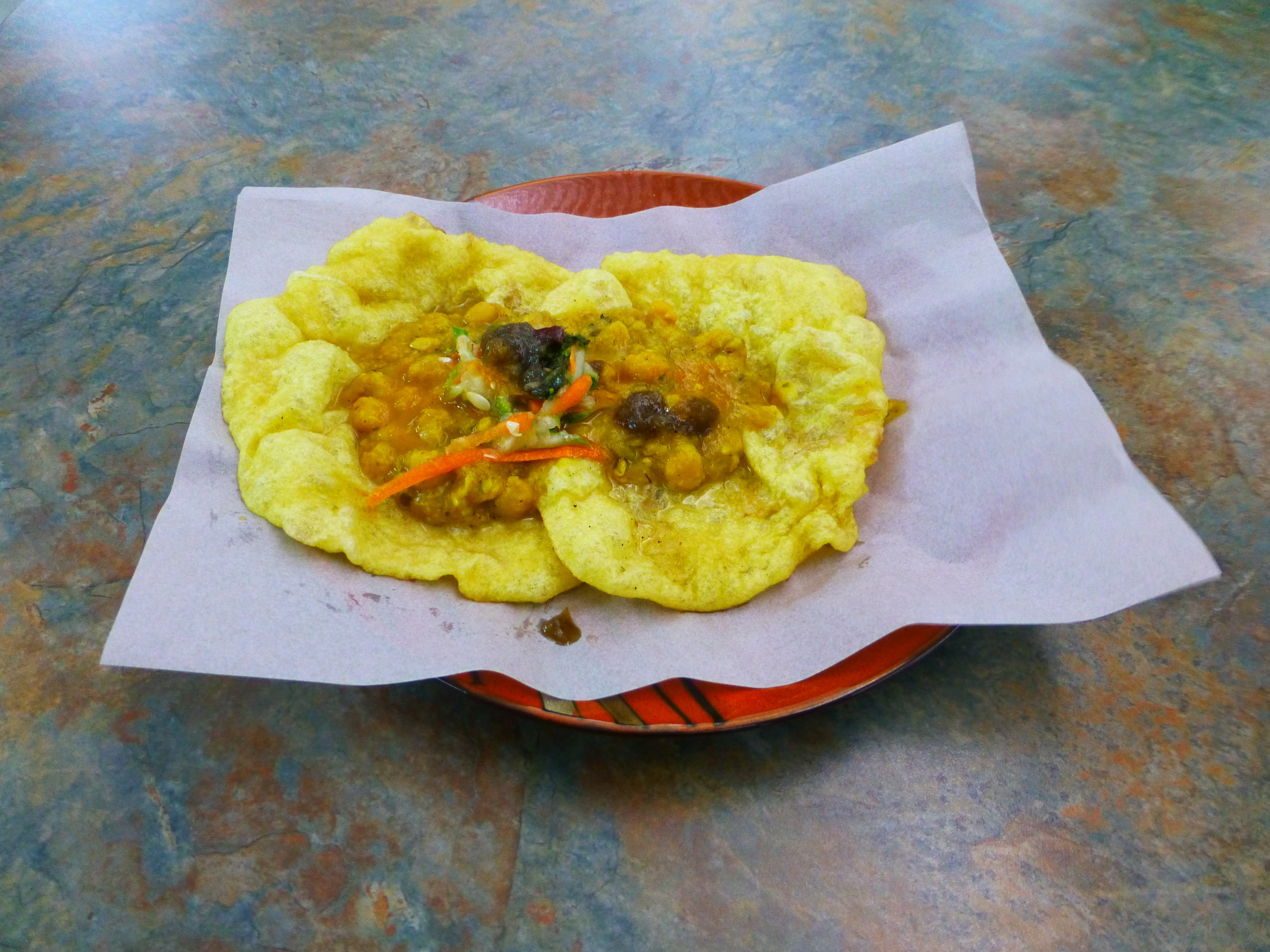
- Doubles
- Place of origin: Trinidad and Tobago
- Region or state: Caribbean, United States, Canada, United Kingdom
- Created by: Emamool Deen
- Serving temperature: Hot
- Main ingredients: Curry chickpea and bara
- Variations: Triples or Single
- Other information: Served with various chutneys, kuchela, and pepper sauce

Doubles is a common street food originating in Trinidad and Tobago and is of Indo-Trinidadian origin. It consists of curried channa (chickpeas) served on two fried baras. It is normally eaten during breakfast, but is also eaten occasionally during lunch or as a late-night snack and popular hangover food.

== Origins ==
Doubles as a dish was created in Princes Town by Emamool "Mamoodeen" Deen and his wife Raheeman Rasulan Deen in 1936. Deen used to sell curried chickpeas over single fried flatbread with chutneys. When his customers began asking him to double the bara in their orders the name "doubles" was coined.

It has been speculated that it was inspired by a northern Indian dish called chole bhature (or sometimes channa bhatura). Chole bhature is made by combining channa masala and bhature (poori), which is a fried bread made with all-purpose flour, also known as "maida" in Hindi.

== Preparation ==
As a base for the curry, onions, garlic and curry powder or plain turmeric powder are fried briefly. Boiled and drained chickpeas are added together with some water and spices, primarily cumin. The curry is cooked until the chickpeas are tender. A dough is prepared, shaped into flattened circles and briefly deep fried. Doubles can be served spicy, sweet, or savory. Condiments include spicy pepper sauce, kuchela, or green mango, culantro, cucumber, coconut, and tamarind chutneys.

== Cultural significance ==
Given the diversity of Trinidad, doubles is credited with its ability to "define and maintain symbolic boundaries of identification", and is considered an authentic standard of Trinidadian cuisine. Doubles is a comfort food for displaced Trinidadians in major cities across the globe. Its consumption has been credited with developing a "deep psychological imprinting" among them, and as such is considered culturally significant for how it encapsulated Trinidadian identity into a simple and unique snack.

Trinidadian-Canadian filmmaker Ian Harnarine has released two films, the 2011 short film Doubles with Slight Pepper and the 2023 feature expansion Doubles, which centre in part on the significance of doubles as a signifier of Trinidadian culture among Trinidadian expatriates.

== See also ==
- Cuisine of Trinidad and Tobago
- Aloo pie
- Saheena
- Pholourie
- Roti (wrap)
