= No Words Came Down =

2011 Canadian film

- Directed by: Ryan Flowers; Lisa Pham
- Written by: Ryan Flowers
- Produced by: Ryan Flowers; Lisa Pham; Tyler Hagan
- Starring: Andrew Gillingham; Tina Hedman; Marysol Folkesson
- Cinematography: Ryan Flowers; Lisa Pham
- Edited by: Ryan Flowers
- Production company: Shakey Films
- Release date: September 13, 2011 (TIFF)
- Running time: 23 minutes
- Country: Canada
- Language: English

No Words Came Down is a Canadian short drama film, directed by Ryan Flowers and Lisa Pham and released in 2011. The film stars Andrew Gillingham as Thomas, an attractive but shy and socially awkward young man who is set up on a blind date with an older woman named Mary (Tina Hedman).

The film premiered at the 2011 Toronto International Film Festival, where it received an honorable mention from the jury for the Best Canadian Short Film award. It was subsequently screened at the 2011 Whistler Film Festival, where it won the ShortWork Award for best short film by British Columbia film students.

The film was named to TIFF's year-end Canada's Top Ten list for short films.
