= Of Events =

2011 Canadian animated short film

- French: D'aléas
- Directed by: Mathieu Tremblay
- Produced by: Mathieu Tremblay
- Edited by: Mathieu Tremblay
- Music by: Olivier Girouard
- Release date: September 12, 2011 (TIFF)
- Running time: 9 minutes
- Country: Canada

Of Events (French: D'aléas) is a Canadian animated short film, directed by Mathieu Tremblay and released in 2011. Animated in black and white, the film centres on a group of people travelling on a train.

The film premiered at the 2011 Toronto International Film Festival, where it received an honorable mention from the jury for the Best Canadian Short Film award. It subsequently received a Jutra Award nomination for Best Animated Short Film at the 14th Jutra Awards in 2012.
