= The Road We've Traveled =

2012 film directed by Davis Guggenheim

- Directed by: Davis Guggenheim
- Produced by: Lisa Remington
- Narrated by: Tom Hanks
- Cinematography: Erich Roland
- Edited by: Kate Amend; Sam Citron
- Music by: Christophe Beck; Jake Monaco
- Release date: March 15, 2012
- Running time: 17 minutes
- Country: United States
- Language: English

The Road We've Traveled is a 2012 documentary film about the Presidency of Barack Obama. Directed by Davis Guggenheim, the documentary was produced by Barack Obama's re-election campaign and was narrated by Tom Hanks.

== The film ==
Events detailed in the film include the 2008 financial crisis, the Patient Protection and Affordable Care Act, the 2008–2010 automotive industry crisis, and the United States Naval Special Warfare Development Group mission that led to the Death of Osama bin Laden.

People interviewed in the film include Vice President Joe Biden, Obama political aide David Axelrod, consumer advocate and former chairwoman of the Congressional Oversight Panel for TARP Elizabeth Warren and former chief of staff and current Mayor of Chicago Rahm Emanuel.

== Reception ==
The New York Times noted the use of social media to reach voters instead of television advertisements. New York Times reviewer Alessandra Stanley said that some critics of the video were "inane", noting that "Presidential candidates have been starring in self-promoting campaign videos since Eisenhower". Stanley also noted that the video focuses more on the "apocalyptic" scenarios averted, saying "It's not morning yet on "The Road We've Traveled." It's the end of the darkest hour of the night." The Washington Post referred to the film as a "masterful stroke", comparing it to a similar film made by Bill Clinton during the 1992 campaign. The reviewer wrote, "It's less of a bragging moment and more like a contractor's bid for renewal".

CNN host Piers Morgan, in an interview with director Davis Guggenheim, was critical of the fact that the film cast Obama in an overly positive light and did not have a more balanced analysis. Liberal commentator Glenn Greenwald wrote that the film, and Guggenheim's subsequent media appearance, displayed "creepy leader worship" and that Guggenheim epitomized the "pure face of the Authoritarian Mind".
