= All Together Now (Beatles song) =

1969 song by The Beatles

- 1972 German picture sleeve

Song by the Beatles

from the album Yellow Submarine
- Released: 13 January 1969 (US); 17 January 1969 (UK)
- Recorded: 12 May 1967
- Studio: EMI, London
- Genre: Music hall; children's music; skiffle
- Length: 2:10
- Label: Apple
- Songwriter: Lennon–McCartney
- Producer: George Martin

"All Together Now" is a song by the English rock band the Beatles written primarily by Paul McCartney and credited to the Lennon–McCartney partnership. The song was recorded during the band's Magical Mystery Tour period, but remained unreleased until it was included on the Yellow Submarine soundtrack. It was released as a single in 1972 in European countries such as France and Germany, backed by "Hey Bulldog".

== Background ==
McCartney described the song as a children's sing-along with the title phrase inspired by the music hall tradition of asking the audience to join in. He also described a "subcurrent" in the song, a dual-meaning where "we are all together now". According to music critic Tom Maginnis of AllMusic, McCartney created the song "to match the same light-hearted spirit" of "Yellow Submarine".

== Recording ==
The track was recorded on 12 May 1967 at EMI Studios and mixed the same day, but was not released until 13 January 1969, when it appeared on the soundtrack album. George Martin was absent from this session, leaving recording engineer Geoff Emerick in charge of the control room. The song took less than six hours to record and was recorded in nine takes, the last of which was selected for overdubs.

== Personnel ==
- Paul McCartney – lead vocals, bass guitar, acoustic guitar, handclaps, percussion
- John Lennon – double-tracked lead vocals (middle eight), backing vocals, ukulele, harmonica, handclaps
- George Harrison – backing vocals, acoustic guitar, handclaps
- Ringo Starr – backing vocals, drums, zill, handclaps

Personnel according to Ian MacDonald

Mark Lewisohn reported that the "party-style" backing vocals were provided by "whoever happened to be around".

== Appearances and performances ==
"All Together Now" appears in an animated sequence in the film Yellow Submarine, and is also introduced by the Beatles themselves in a final live-action scene of the film. During the latter scene, translations of "All Together Now" into various languages appear written on-screen.

Paul McCartney performed the song live for the first time by any Beatle on 4 May 2013 at the Estádio Mineirão, Belo Horizonte, Brazil. He subsequently played it throughout his 2013–15 Out There tour.

== Charts ==
Chart (1972)	Peak position
Sweden (Tio i Topp)	7
Netherlands (Single Top 100)	16

== Cover versions ==
"All Together Now" has been covered by various artists. Versions intended for children have been released by the Sugarbeats, the Bingo Kids, the Muppets and others.

André 3000 of the duo OutKast covered the song for a Nike commercial that ran during the 2010 NBA Finals. The song was released on digital streaming platforms in 2010 via LaFace Records, and received a 5,000-copy limited release on a seven-inch record single on 22 April 2017 via Arista Records and Legacy Recordings for Record Store Day.

In May 2020, singer Lizzo covered the song for a commercial for Facebook's Messenger Rooms product.

== See also ==
- All Together Now, a feature-length documentary about the Cirque du Soleil project Love.
