= Hammer (2019 film) =

2019 Canadian drama film

- Directed by: Christian Sparkes
- Written by: Christian Sparkes; Joel Thomas Hynes
- Produced by: Allison White; Chris Agoston; Jonathan Bronfman; William Woods
- Starring: Will Patton; Mark O'Brien; Ben Cotton
- Cinematography: Mike McLaughlin
- Edited by: Jorge Weisz
- Music by: Jeffrey Morrow
- Production companies: Sara Fost Pictures; The Screen Asylum; JoBro Productions; Woods Entertainment
- Distributed by: A71 Entertainment; Vertical Entertainment
- Release date: December 5, 2019 (Whistler)
- Running time: 82 minutes
- Country: Canada
- Language: English

Hammer is a 2019 Canadian crime thriller film, directed by Christian Sparkes. The film stars Will Patton as Stephen Davis, a man in Sault Ste. Marie, Ontario, whose estranged son Chris (Mark O'Brien) double-crosses drug dealer Adams (Ben Cotton), forcing Stephen and Chris to reunite after Adams takes Stephen's younger son Jeremy (Connor Price) hostage.

The cast also includes Vickie Papavs as Stephen's wife Karen, as well as Dayle McLeod, Curtis Caravaggio, Lara Jean Chorostecki, Jason Weinberg, Stephen Lush, Deidre Gillard-Rowlings and Trish Rainone in supporting roles.

The film premiered in the Canadian Vanguard program at the 2019 Whistler Film Festival, before going into commercial release on video on demand platform in 2020.

== Critical response ==
Allie Gregory of Exclaim! wrote that "Hammer is a succinct and realistic examination of these family archetypes, never leaning too far into the outlandish tropes of the crime thriller genre. You won't see any car chases or martial arts; rather, you'll get a slick, solid, hour-and-a-half tale of the everyman stumbling through dodgy black market activity, while trying to subdue the dangers he presents to the people around him. And it works really, really well."

For The Globe and Mail, Barry Hertz wrote that "while Sparkes’ script requires a substantial amount of gullibility from its audience, it is still a mostly slick and tight invention. As Chris and Stephen are plunged into an afternoon of ugliness, the urge to scream at them for their poor choices matches the compulsion to pay careful attention to whatever fresh hell Sparkes unleashes next."

Dennis Harvey of Variety wrote that "The constant escalation of danger in Sparkes’ script (from a story co-credited to Joel Thomas Hynes, who wrote the director's prior feature, “Cast No Shadow”) often threatens to become overkill, particularly since its poker-faced presentation admits to no absurdity or even much gallows’ humor. Still, the film manages to maintain enough conviction to pull this hyperbolic scenario off. Embedded in the tale are reversals of character expectation — it's hand-wringing Karen rather than gruff Stephen who emerges the unforgiving “tough love” parent, while “good son” Jeremy and perpetual screwup Chris aren't quite what they appear — which demand sometimes-challenging leaps of viewer belief. Fortunately, the impressive cast makes that doable. In particular, Patton lends his father figure a pained devotion that renders just about psychologically plausible straight-arrow Stephen's willingness to violently flaunt the law under pressure. And O’Brien gradually reveals how Chris has already done a lot to redeem himself, even if appearances suggest the opposite."

For The Hollywood Reporter, Frank Scheck wrote that "it’s Patton’s intense, vanity-free turn — his wildly unkempt, thinning hair practically delivers a performance of its own — that firmly anchors the proceedings. Although the film’s relentless pacing doesn’t allow for much in terms of emotional dynamics, he provides subtle nuances that keep you fully invested in his character, from a low-key breakdown scene that is all the more moving for its restraint to a rueful grunt in the final scene that speaks volumes. This is an actor who knows how to produce maximum effect through minimal means."
