= Tyler Hagan =

Canadian film producer

- Hagan in 2026

Tyler Hagan is a Canadian film producer from British Columbia. He is most noted as a two-time Canadian Screen Award nominee, as producer of the Canadian Screen Award for Best Motion Picture nominees Never Steady, Never Still at the 6th Canadian Screen Awards in 2018, and The Body Remembers When the World Broke Open at the 8th Canadian Screen Awards in 2020.

The co-founder with Kathleen Hepburn of Experimental Forest Films, his other credits have included the films No Words Came Down, The World Is Bright, Until Branches Bend, Seagrass, Nechako: It Will Be a Big River Again, Meadowlarks, Akashi and In Alaska.
