= Davis Guggenheim =

American film and television director and producer

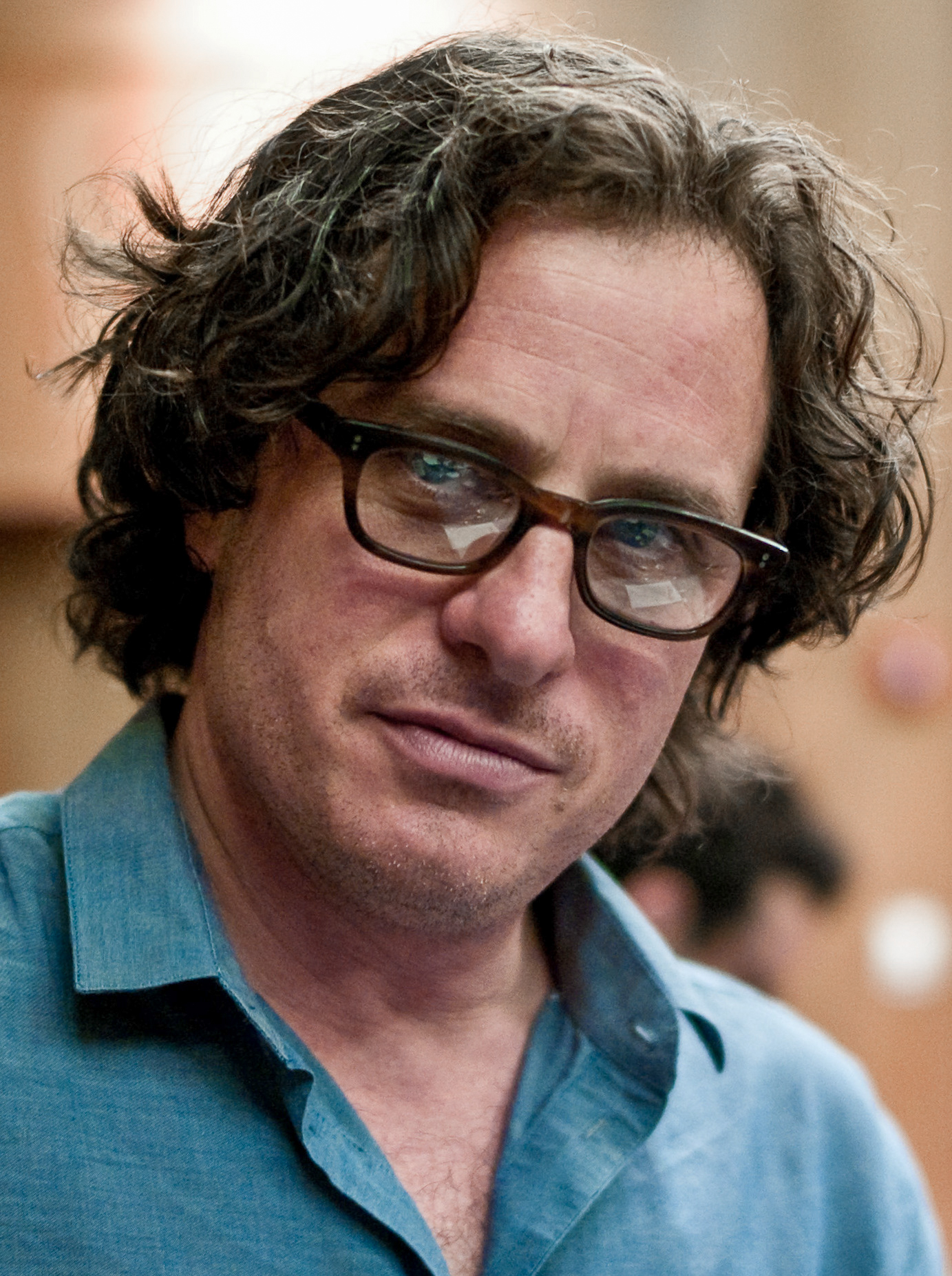
- Guggenheim in 2009
- Born: Philip Davis Guggenheim; November 3, 1963 (age 62); St. Louis, Missouri, U.S.
- Education: Brown University
- Occupations: Director; writer; producer
- Years active: 1991–present
- Spouse: Elisabeth Shue (m. 1994)
- Children: 3
- Parent: Charles Guggenheim (father)

Philip Davis Guggenheim (born November 3, 1963) is an American screenwriter, director, and producer.

Active in television and film's directions and productions since the 1990s, from 2006 Guggenheim has specialized in making documentaries, ranking the top 100 highest-grossing documentaries of all time with three works: An Inconvenient Truth, It Might Get Loud, and Waiting for "Superman".

Guggenheim's cinematographic projects received several awards and nominations, including the Academy Award for Best Documentary Feature Film for An Inconvenient Truth, the Critics' Choice Movie Award for Best Documentary Feature for He Named Me Malala and two nominations at the Primetime Emmy Award for Outstanding Directing for a Documentary/Nonfiction Program.

His credits include NYPD Blue, ER, 24, Alias, The Shield, Deadwood, and the documentaries It Might Get Loud, The Road We've Traveled, Waiting for "Superman", Inside Bill's Brain: Decoding Bill Gates.

== Early life ==
Philip Davis Guggenheim was born in St. Louis, Missouri, the son of Marion Davis (née Streett) and filmmaker Charles Guggenheim. His father was Jewish, whereas his mother was Episcopalian. He graduated from the Potomac School, Sidwell Friends School and Brown University.

== Career ==
Guggenheim joined the HBO Western drama Deadwood as a producer and director for the first season in 2004. The series was created by David Milch and focused on a growing town in the American West. Guggenheim directed the episodes "Deep Water", "Reconnoitering the Rim", "Plague" and "Sold Under Sin". He left the show at the end of Season 1.

The documentary An Inconvenient Truth was produced and directed by Davis Guggenheim. An Inconvenient Truth won the Academy Award in 2007 for Best Documentary Feature. The film, released in 2006, featured former U.S. Vice President Al Gore and his international slideshow on global warming.

Then-candidate Barack Obama's biographical film, which aired during the Democratic National Convention in August 2008, was directed by Guggenheim. Their infomercial, which was broadcast two months later, on October 29, 2008, was "executed with high standards of cinematography", according to The New York Times. In 2012, he released The Road We've Traveled, a 17-minute short film on the president.

Guggenheim directed and was an executive producer of the 2009 pilot for Melrose Place.

In 2008, he released It Might Get Loud, a documentary that glimpses into the lives of guitarists Jimmy Page, The Edge, and Jack White.

Guggenheim's 2010 documentary Waiting for "Superman", a film about the failures of American public education sparked controversy and debate. Guggenheim knew his film would lead to this and said, "I know people will say this movie is anti-this or pro-that. But it really is all about families trying to find great schools". This film received the Audience Award for best documentary at the 2010 Sundance Film Festival. Its public release was in September 2010.

A documentary film about the band U2 directed by Guggenheim titled From the Sky Down opened the 2011 Toronto International Film Festival in September.

In 2013, he directed The Dream is Now, a 30-minute documentary about four undocumented students in the United States as they deal with the U.S. immigration system.

In 2015, he directed a documentary film He Named Me Malala about Pakistani activist Malala Yousafzai, who was targeted by Taliban gunmen, shot in the head and left wounded.

In 2019, he created and directed a documentary miniseries titled Inside Bill's Brain: Decoding Bill Gates. The series explores the mind and motivations behind the captain of industry and philanthropist Bill Gates, the rise of Microsoft, and the past and current pursuits of the Bill & Melinda Gates Foundation.

In 2020, Guggenheim and Jonathan King launched production company Concordia Studio.

In 2023, the documentary Still: A Michael J. Fox Movie, directed by Guggenheim, was released on Apple TV+. Featuring read excerpts from Michael J. Fox's own books, the biopic stars Fox himself as both interviewee and narrator, recounting his career and experience contending with Parkinson's disease. The feature received seven Emmy Nominations.

== Personal life ==
Guggenheim married actress Elisabeth Shue in 1994. They have three children together. He is the first cousin of actress Patty Guggenheim.

== Accolades ==
Year	Award	Category	Nominee(s)	Result	Ref.
2006	Gotham Independent Film Awards	Best Documentary	An Inconvenient Truth	Nominated	
2006	Los Angeles Film Critics Association Awards	Best Documentary/Non-Fiction Film	An Inconvenient Truth	Won	
2006	Washington D.C. Area Film Critics Association Awards	Best Documentary Feature	An Inconvenient Truth	Won	
2007	Academy Awards	Best Documentary Feature Film	An Inconvenient Truth	Won	
2010	Sundance Film Festival	Audience Award for Best Documentary	Waiting for "Superman"	Won	
2011	Critics' Choice Movie Awards	Best Documentary Feature	Waiting for "Superman"	Won	
2011	Directors Guild of America Awards	Outstanding Directing – Documentaries	Waiting for "Superman"	Nominated	
2011	San Diego Film Festival	Best Documentary	Waiting for "Superman"	Won	
2011	San Diego Film Festival	Audience Award for Best Documentary	Waiting for "Superman"	Won	
2015	Adelaide Film Festival	Best Documentary	He Named Me Malala	Nominated	
2016	British Academy Film Awards	Best Documentary	He Named Me Malala	Nominated	
2016	Cinema for Peace awards	Most Valuable Documentary of the Year	He Named Me Malala	Nominated	
2016	Critics' Choice Awards	Best Documentary - Feature	He Named Me Malala	Nominated	
2016	Primetime Creative Arts Emmy Awards	Outstanding Directing for Nonfiction Programming	He Named Me Malala	Nominated	
2016	San Diego Film Festival	Audience Choice Award	He Named Me Malala	Won	
2016	Satellite Awards	Best Documentary Film	He Named Me Malala	Nominated	
2023	Critics' Choice Documentary Awards	Best Director	Still: A Michael J. Fox Movie	Won	
2024	Primetime Emmy Awards	Outstanding Directing For A Documentary/Nonfiction Program	Still: A Michael J. Fox Movie	Won	
