= Jorge Weisz =

Jorge Weisz is a Mexican-Canadian film editor. He is most noted for his work on the films Empire of Dirt, for which he received a Canadian Screen Award nomination for Best Editing at the 2nd Canadian Screen Awards in 2014, and Sharp Corner, for which he was nominated in the same category at the 13th Canadian Screen Awards in 2025.

His other credits have included the films Pretend We're Kissing, Wet Bum, Debug, The Steps, April's Daughter, Level 16, Castle in the Ground, Placa de acero, Hammer, Night Raiders, The Horror of Dolores Roach, Sweetland and Steal Away.

He has been a two-time Directors Guild of Canada nominee for Best Picture Editing in a Feature Film, for Hammer in 2020 and for Night Raiders in 2022, and a three-time Canadian Cinema Editors award nominee for Best Editing in a Feature film, for Empire of Dirt in 2014, Wet Bum in 2015 and The Steps in 2016.
