= From the Sky Down =

2011 documentary film about U2

- Film poster featuring Larry Mullen, Jr.
- Directed by: Davis Guggenheim
- Produced by: Ted Skillman; Belisa Balaban; Davis Guggenheim; Brian Celler
- Starring: Bono; Adam Clayton; The Edge; Larry Mullen, Jr.
- Cinematography: Erich Roland
- Edited by: Jay Cassidy; Geraud Brisson
- Music by: Michael Brook
- Production company: Documentary Partners
- Distributed by: Universal Music Group
- Release dates: September 8, 2011 (TIFF); October 29, 2011 (US)
- Running time: 85 minutes (director's cut); 74 minutes (Achtung Baby box set)
- Country: United States
- Language: English

From the Sky Down is a 2011 American documentary film directed by Davis Guggenheim about rock band U2 and the production of their 1991 album Achtung Baby. The film documents the album's difficult recording period, the band members' relationships, and the group's creative process. Guggenheim, who was commissioned by U2 to create the film to commemorate the record's 20th anniversary, spent several months in 2011 developing the documentary. The band were filmed during a return visit to Hansa Studios in Berlin where parts of the album were recorded, and during rehearsals in Winnipeg for the Glastonbury Festival 2011. The film contains unreleased scenes from the group's 1988 motion picture Rattle and Hum, along with archival footage and stills from the Achtung Baby recording sessions. Development of the album's emblematic song "One" is recounted through the replaying of old recording tapes.

The film premiered at the 2011 Toronto International Film Festival on September 8, 2011, the first time in the festival's history that a documentary was screened as the opening film. Beginning in October, a series of television broadcasts commenced, including showings on BBC Television, Showtime, and Super Channel. The film was bundled with the deluxe editions of Achtung Baby's 20th anniversary reissue and was later released as standalone copies on Blu-ray and DVD on December 12, 2011. Reviews from critics were mixed; many found the insight into the band's creative process informative, while others judged that the film did not provide adequate in-depth coverage of the album. From the Sky Down was nominated for the 2013 Grammy Award for Best Long Form Music Video.

== Background ==
After the commercial and critical success of their 1987 album The Joshua Tree, U2 produced a motion picture and companion album titled Rattle and Hum that was subject to a critical backlash. The band's exploration of American music for the project was variously labelled as "pretentious" and "misguided and bombastic". The group's high exposure and their reputation for being overly serious led to accusations of grandiosity and self-righteousness. In addition to the criticism they faced, U2 dealt with internal creative dissatisfaction; lead vocalist Bono believed they were musically unprepared for their success, and drummer Larry Mullen, Jr. said, "We were the biggest, but we weren't the best". Towards the end of the Lovetown Tour in 1989, Bono announced onstage that it was "the end of something for U2", and that "we have to go away and ... dream it all up again".

Wishing to reinvent themselves and seeking inspiration from German reunification, the group de-camped to Hansa Studios in Berlin in October 1990 with producers Daniel Lanois and Brian Eno to record Achtung Baby. The sessions were fraught with conflict, as the band argued over their musical direction and the quality of their material. Weeks of tension and slow progress nearly took their toll: the group considered breaking up, but they made a breakthrough with the improvised writing of the song "One". With improved morale, the group completed the album in Dublin in 1991. In November, Achtung Baby was released to critical acclaim. Musically, it incorporated influences from the alternative rock, electronic dance music, and industrial music of the time. Thematically, it was a more introspective and personal record; it was darker, yet at times more flippant than the band's previous work. The album and the subsequent multimedia-intensive Zoo TV Tour were central to the group's 1990s reinvention, whereby they abandoned their earnest public image for a more lighthearted and self-deprecating one. Achtung Baby has been one of the group's most commercially successful records, selling 18 million copies.

== Production ==
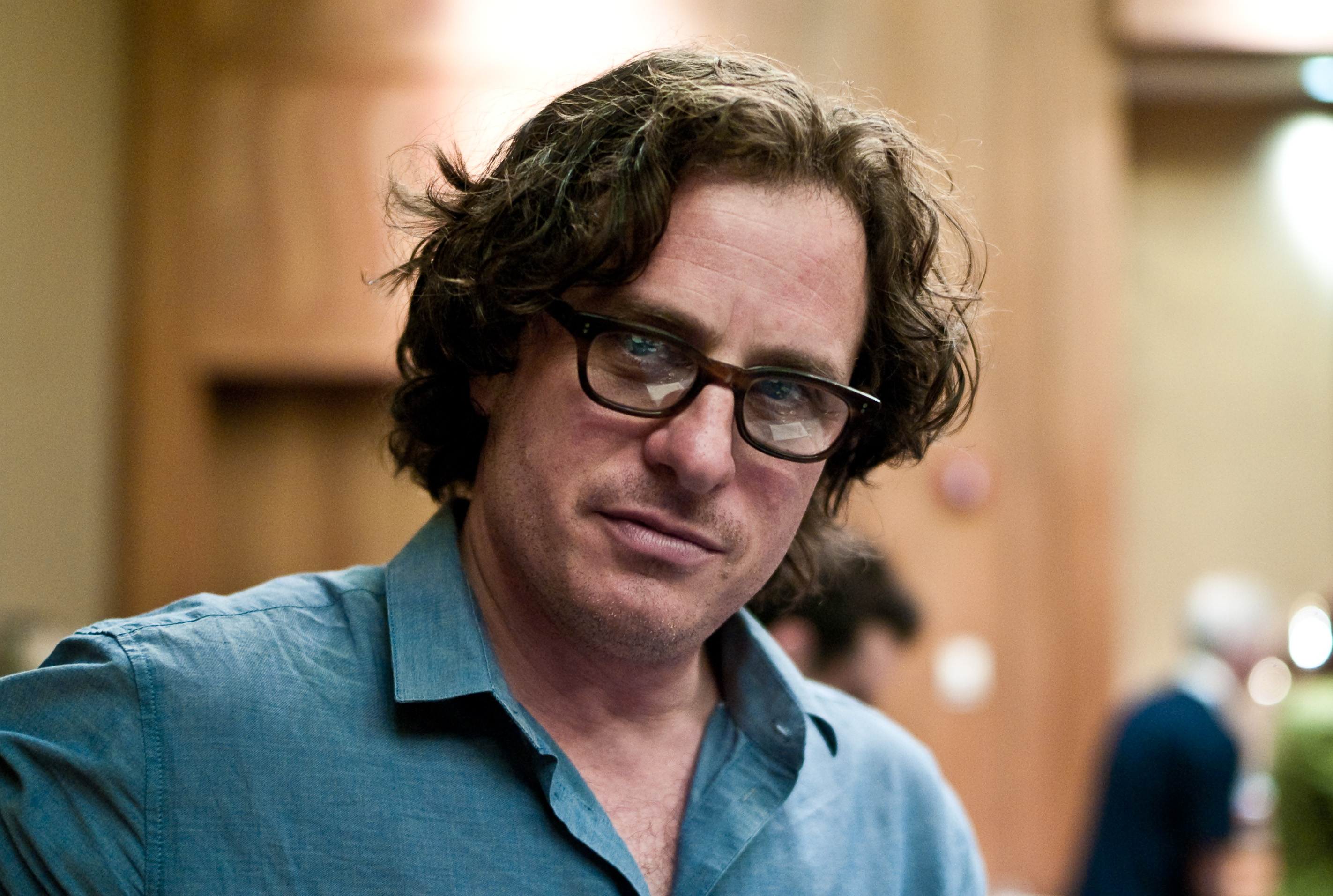
Director Davis Guggenheim was allowed access to the band's archives for the film, and despite the group's reservations, he was given final say over the film's content.

To commemorate the 20th anniversary of Achtung Baby's original release, U2 reissued the record in several formats in October 2011. Leading up to the anniversary, the band was unsure how much attention to pay to a past album while still actively writing and recording new material. Guitarist The Edge said, "How big a deal do we make of an anniversary when we're in the middle of what we're doing now? We had a hard time figuring that out. We're not a heritage act. We're still very active. But this record was so pivotal that we felt it was OK to revisit it." Director Davis Guggenheim was subsequently commissioned by the band to make a film about Achtung Baby in six months. As a fan of U2 since his youth and having previously collaborated with The Edge for the 2008 documentary It Might Get Loud, Guggenheim agreed to the project. His goal for the film was to explain how U2 managed to remain together for so long, in contrast to other rock groups that have been undone by internal conflict; he described the band's longevity as "fighting against that law of physics". Guggenheim also sought to tell the story of how the band transformed themselves musically over the course of Achtung Baby's recording sessions.

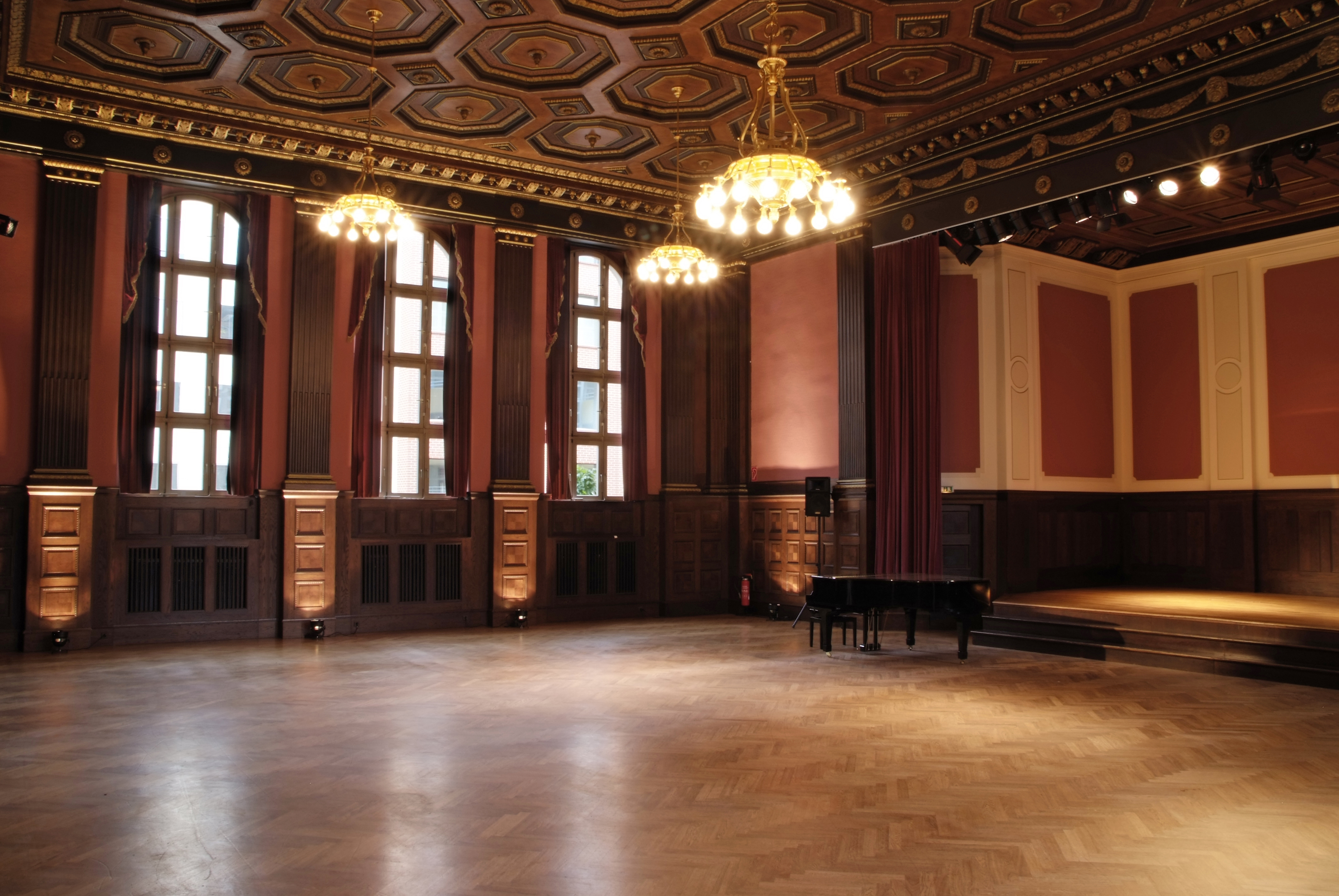
One segment of the documentary depicts U2 returning to Hansa Studios to revisit Achtung Baby.

While U2 were on the South American leg of their U2 360° Tour in March–April 2011, Guggenheim requested complete access to the band's archives in Dublin. To his surprise, they complied. While researching footage, the director was impressed by an unused Rattle and Hum video that he found, describing it as "rare and beautiful". Some of the footage included scenes of Bono throwing a tantrum in a dressing room and the band performing in a blues club. Guggenheim conducted the audio interviews with the band members that comprise much of the film while they were in Santiago, Chile. After their touring obligations in South America ended, the band met Guggenheim in Berlin for two days in May "to go back to the scene of the crime". They were filmed at Hansa Studios performing songs from the album and speaking to Guggenheim in lengthy individual interviews. Additionally, the group were filmed touring Berlin and driving a Trabant, an automobile that previously appeared in the album artwork for Achtung Baby and was incorporated into the lighting system of the Zoo TV Tour.

The band expected a less personal treatment for the film and were at times uncomfortable with the extent to which Guggenheim probed into their history. Responding to the band's concerns, Guggenheim said, "I tell the story that's in front of me, warts and all. In the rock 'n' roll business, it's about adding layers. My process strips layers away. Rock stars are more comfortable creating an aura and mystique." Despite U2's discomfort, they allowed Guggenheim to have creative control over the film. He remarked, "They said from the beginning, we want you to make the movie that you want to make and they let me make the movie I wanted to make. It was pretty astounding. I think part of it is the trust we gained doing It Might Get Loud, they sort of let me have a free hand." Bono said that it was the least involved the band had ever been in a U2 project. Additional filming took place on May 27 at Burton Cummings Theatre in Winnipeg during the band's rehearsals for the Glastonbury Festival 2011. A rough cut of the movie was shown to the group in July, much to their satisfaction. According to Guggenheim, "They were over the moon. They loved it." The only request the band made was that the film should be shortened in length, and Guggenheim agreed.

== Release ==
From the Sky Down premiered at the 2011 Toronto International Film Festival (TIFF) on September 8, 2011. It marked the first time in the festival's history that a documentary was shown as the opening film. Bono, The Edge, and Guggenheim attended the premiere and appeared on stage prior to the film's showing to make brief remarks. The first television broadcast of From the Sky Down was held in the UK on BBC Television on October 9, 2011, as part of the Imagine series, while the first American broadcast was on October 29, 2011, on the Showtime television network. Two days later, a 74-minute version of the film was commercially released on DVD in the "Über Deluxe" and "Super Deluxe" editions of the 20th anniversary reissue of Achtung Baby. Canadian distribution rights were acquired by BBC Worldwide Canada, who licensed it for broadcast on Super Channel on November 19, 2011. Standalone copies of the full, 85-minute director's cut of From the Sky Down were released on Blu-ray and DVD on December 12, 2011, with bonus footage of the band performing at Hansa Studios and a question-and-answer session with Bono, The Edge, and Guggenheim from TIFF.

== Reception ==
Critics' reviews of From the Sky Down were mixed. Owen Gleiberman of Entertainment Weekly gave the film an enthusiastic review, describing it as "one of the most transcendent close-up looks at the process of creating rock & roll I've ever seen." In his opinion, the film was a "stirring testament to what it really means when four people in this world can create magical things because they band together." Hank Steuver of The Washington Post called it an "intriguing" documentary that "becomes a revealing and even enlightening meditation on the mystery of why some bands stay together and some don't." The reviewer said the film is "refreshingly blunt and beautifully assembled" and praised Guggenheim for asking the band tough questions about that period in their history. Brad Wheeler of The Globe and Mail gave the film a three-out-of-four star rating, calling it an "essential companion piece" to the reissue of Achtung Baby. Wheeler wrote that "the process of U2 dreaming itself a new fashion while struggling to get its joy back is tightly and adroitly explored". Radio broadcaster Alan Cross wrote that the viewer will "come out with a new appreciation of what it takes to be U2". Cross enjoyed the scenes in which the band revisit old DAT tapes demonstrating the evolution of the songs "Mysterious Ways" and "One", along with the animated scenes. Drew McWeeny of HitFix wrote that the documentary is not a "complete record" of Achtung Baby's conception, but that it "offers fans a rare glimpse at the process behind U2's music, and for non-fans, it attempts to set a context in which they can appreciate what it is that U2 accomplished". Like other reviewers, he highlighted the scene in which the band revisits the recording of "One" as one of the film's most important. McWeeny ended his review by saying, "This may not be everything I wanted from the movie, but it's solid, and the glimpse we get of real creative alchemy is impressive, indeed."

Other reviewers were more critical. Neil Genzlinger of The New York Times said the film "has a few segments that get beyond platitudes". He enjoyed the sequences that highlighted individual songs but noted the documentary "doesn't have much in the way of full songs". Steven Zeitchik of the Los Angeles Times called From the Sky Down a "procedural look" at the album's inception. Although he enjoyed Bono's humorous insights, Zeitchik said that "much of the movie is abstract, insider stuff about how he and others find inspiration". John DeFore of The Hollywood Reporter pointed out the limited scope of the film, calling it "neither a comprehensive portrait nor one of those tossed-off featurettes that would be at home only as the filler for a commemorative Achtung Baby boxed set". Commenting on Guggenheim's filmmaking style, DeFore judged that some of his attempts to make the film more "movie-ish" failed to enhance the subject material. In the reviewer's opinion, this gave the "impression of a filmmaker who can tell this story competently but isn't quite up to making a lasting film about one of rock history's most successful bands". Steven Hyden of The A.V. Club gave the film a C+, calling it "occasionally enlightening but mostly frustrating". The review lamented the lack of coverage of most of the album's songs, and in Hyden's opinion, it was ironic that the band was trying to live down the "ego-inflating" Rattle and Hum in a film that he also considered "ego-inflating".

From the Sky Down was nominated for the 2013 Grammy Award for Best Long Form Music Video.
