= Nechako: It Will Be a Big River Again =

2025 Canadian documentary film

- Directed by: Lyana Patrick
- Written by: Lyana Patrick
- Produced by: Tyler Hagan; Jessica Hallenbeck
- Cinematography: Sean Stiller
- Edited by: Erin Cumming; Milena Salazar
- Music by: Jesse Zubot
- Production companies: Experimental Forest Films; Lantern Films
- Distributed by: National Film Board of Canada
- Release date: May 3, 2025 (DOXA)
- Running time: 91 minutes
- Country: Canada
- Language: English

Nechako: It Will Be a Big River Again is a Canadian documentary film, directed by Lyana Patrick and released in 2025. The film centres on the Stellat'en and Saik'uz First Nations, and their fight for restitution after the construction of the Kenney Dam disrupted their traditional livelihoods on and around the Nechako River.

The film premiered at the DOXA Documentary Film Festival, where it received an honorable mention from the Colin Low Award jury.
