= Analogue Revolution: How Feminist Media Changed the World =

2023 Canadian documentary film

- Directed by: Marusya Bociurkiw
- Written by: Marusya Bociurkiw
- Produced by: Marusya Bociurkiw; Eponine Young
- Narrated by: Carole Pope
- Cinematography: DOP Vanessa Abadhir; Chelsea Innes; Vanessa Millado
- Edited by: Eugene Weis
- Music by: Graham Campbell; Robbie Teehan
- Release date: September 15, 2023 (AIFF)
- Running time: 96 minutes
- Country: Canada
- Language: English

Analogue Revolution: How Feminist Media Changed the World is a 2023 Canadian documentary film, directed by Marusya Bociurkiw.

== Synopsis ==
Narrated by Carole Pope, the film profiles the rise of feminist media in the 1970s and 1980s, prior to the emergence of the Internet as a tool of networking and activism in the 1990s.

Figures appearing in the film include Zanana Akande, Kay Armatage, Marian Penner Bancroft, Anne Bishop, Grace Channer, Susan G. Cole, TJ Cuthand, Sylvia Hamilton, Bonnie Sherr Klein, Marion Quednau, Judy Rebick, Lisa Steele and Zainub Verjee.

== Release ==
The film premiered at the 2023 Atlantic International Film Festival, and was subsequently screened at events including the Toronto Independent Film Festival, GEMFest, and the Regina International Film Festival.

== Accolades ==
The film was a Canadian Screen Award nominee for Best Feature Length Documentary at the 13th Canadian Screen Awards in 2025.
