= Galore (novel) =

2009 novel by Michael Crummey

- First edition (CA)
- Author: Michael Crummey
- Language: English
- Genre: Fiction
- Publisher: Doubleday (2009, CA); Other Press (2011, US); Corsair (2012, UK)
- Publication date: 2009 (CA), 2011 (US)
- Pages: 352
- ISBN: 978-1590514344

Galore is a 2009 novel by Michael Crummey first published by Doubleday Canada. It is about the discovery of an 18th-century Jonah in a remote coastal town of Paradise Deep, Newfoundland.

== Plot ==
According to Other Press webpage, Galore concerns the following:

"When a whale beaches itself on the shore of the remote coastal town of Paradise Deep, the last thing any of the townspeople expect to find inside it is a man, silent and reeking of fish, but remarkably alive. The discovery of this mysterious person, soon christened Judah, sets the town scrambling for answers as its most prominent citizens weigh in on whether he is man or beast, blessing or curse, miracle or demon. Though Judah is a shocking addition, the town of Paradise Deep is already full of unusual characters. King-me Sellers, self-appointed patriarch, has it in for an inscrutable woman known only as Devine’s Widow, with whom he has a decades-old feud. Her granddaughter, Mary Tryphena, is just a child when Judah washes ashore, but finds herself tied to him all her life in ways she never expects. Galore is the story of the saga that develops between these families, full of bitterness and love, spanning two centuries. With Paradise Deep, award-winning novelist Michael Crummey imagines a realm where the line between the everyday and the otherworldly is impossible to discern. Sprawling and intimate, stark and fantastical, Galore is a novel about the power of stories to shape and sustain us."

== Awards ==
- Winner of the Commonwealth Writers' Prize for Best Book, Caribbean & Canada
- Winner of the Canadian Authors' Association Literary Award
- Finalist for the International Impac Dublin Award
- Finalist for the Governor General’s Award for Fiction
- Finalist for the Thomas Head Raddall Award for Atlantic Books
- Finalist for the Winterset Award
