= Doubles (2023 film) =

- Directed by: Ian Harnarine
- Written by: Ian Harnarine
- Produced by: Mark Sirju
- Starring: Errol Sitahal; Sanjiv Boodhu
- Cinematography: Bob Gundu; Ash Tailor
- Edited by: Baun Mah
- Music by: Simon Poole; Nikhil Seetharam
- Production company: MAS Media
- Distributed by: Game Theory Films
- Release date: September 17, 2023 (AIFF)
- Running time: 90 minutes
- Country: Canada
- Language: English

Doubles is a Canadian drama film, directed by Ian Harnarine and released in 2023. An expansion of his Genie Award-winning 2011 short film Doubles with Slight Pepper, the film stars Sanjiv Boodhu as Dhani, a young doubles vendor in Trinidad who travels to Toronto to visit his estranged father Ragbir (Errol Sitahal), only to learn that his father is dying.

Its cast also includes Rashaana Cumberbatch, David Fraser, Leela Sitahal, Vas Saranga, Oluniké Adeliyi, Stephanie Herrera, Orville Cummings, Premika Leo, Patti-Anne Ali and Kris Persad.

== Production and distribution ==
The film was announced as receiving funding from Telefilm Canada's Talent to Watch program in 2019. Production was impacted by the COVID-19 pandemic.

It premiered on September 17, 2023, at the 2023 Atlantic International Film Festival, and was screened the following week as the opening film of the Trinidad and Tobago Film Festival.

It was subsequently screened as the opening film of the 2024 Canadian Film Festival, before going into commercial release in July 2024.

== Critical response ==
Marie Saadeh of Exclaim! wrote that "The strongest elements of the film are the performances by Boodhu and Sitahal, who masterfully convey a strained and stubborn yet, beneath it all, loving father-son dynamic that invites us to care deeply about each character's journey. A lively Caribbean soundtrack accompanies the film and often contrasts with the dark and harsh Canadian winter we see Dhani experience for the first time. Harnarine shows true care and intention in how the culture around Caribbean food is depicted in the film. It's a touching tribute to the immigrant experience and forgiveness, and undoubtedly will leave its audience hungry for some doubles."

== Awards ==
Award	Date of ceremony	Category	Recipient(s)	Result	Ref(s)
Canadian Film Festival	2024	William F. White Reel Canadian Indie	Doubles	Won	
Canadian Film Festival	2024	People's Pick for Best Flick	Doubles	Won	
Canadian Film Festival	2024	Best Supporting Performance	Errol Sitahal	Won	
