= Placa de acero =

- Directed by: Abe Rosenberg
- Written by: Joseph Hemsani
- Produced by: Daniel Pomerantz
- Cinematography: Tom Banks
- Edited by: Jorge Weisz
- Music by: Christian Paris
- Production company: Magnifico Entertainment
- Release date: 15 November 2019 (Mexico)
- Country: Mexico
- Language: Spanish

Placa de acero is a 2019 action comedy film produced by Magnifico Entertainment. It was directed and written by Abe Rosenberg and also written by Joseph Hemsani. It stars Alfonso Dosal, Adrián Vázquez, Eduardo España, and others. It was released in Mexico on 15 November 2019.

== Plot ==
Roberto Recto (Alfonso Dosal) has just graduated from the police academy as an element of excellence, not only in physical tests but also in knowledge and rectitude. As soon as he appears in his new workplace, the official Adrián Vázquez is assigned as his couple, an officer who represents the stereotype of slightly corrupt officers. Things are going wrong between the two from the first minute, but after a series of homicides perpetrated by a cannibal, both must put aside their differences in order to find the root of the problem and save civilians while understanding the motivations of the other and show the lack of empathy that exists towards the police.

== Cast ==
- Alfonso Dosal as Roberto Recto
- Adrián Vázquez as Adrián Vázquez
- Regina Blandón as News anchor
- Arnulfo Reyes Sánchez as Timo
- Quetzalli Cortés as Ismael "El Canibal"
- Carlos Valencia as Germán el Alemán
