= The King Tide =

2023 Canadian drama thriller film

- Directed by: Christian Sparkes
- Written by: Albert Shin; William Woods
- Story by: Kevin Coughlin; Ryan Grassby
- Produced by: Allison White; William Woods
- Starring: Frances Fisher; Lara Jean Chorostecki; Clayne Crawford; Aden Young
- Cinematography: Mike McLaughlin
- Edited by: Justin Oakey
- Music by: Andrew Staniland
- Production companies: Woods Entertainment; Sarah Fost Pictures; Tip-Top Productions
- Distributed by: VVS Films
- Release dates: 11 September 2023 (TIFF); 26 April 2024 (Canada)
- Running time: 100 minutes
- Country: Canada
- Language: English

The King Tide is a 2023 Canadian drama thriller film, directed by Christian Sparkes.

The film is set in a small island fishing village where a child turns up who has special, mystical powers, leading social order in the town to the brink of civil war as the residents disagree about whether the child was sent for a larger spiritual purpose.

== Plot ==
Grace miscarries during a storm. The next morning, her husband Bobby and community doctor Beau repair damage and rescue an infant girl from the sea. A wound Bobby received spontaneously heals while he holds the girl.

Ten years later, Grace and Bobby are raising the girl, named Isla. The community has isolated itself, relying on Isla's powers. Grace's mother Faye, who has recovered from dementia, oversees ritualized "visitations" under Isla's healing influence. Faye is also the community's schoolteacher, framing the community as a "chosen folk". "Many thanks to Isla" is a common valediction.

One day Isla and Beau's son Junior find a wasp nest. Isla becomes fascinated as wasps congregate on her. However, when the wasps attack Junior, she closes her eyes and clenches a fist, instantly killing the entire colony. She makes Junior promise to not tell anyone.

The men engage in bare-knuckle boxing. Champion Dillon beats Bobby, winning a wager for Isla to aid the fishermen. Isla and Bobby accompany Dillon and Frank purse seining from rowboats, and within minutes Isla attracts hundreds of fish. Meanwhile, children play a game of dares: Frank's son Philip ingests poison and runs to Isla's house, believing she will be there. Gravely ill, Philip is brought to the disused clinic where Beau pumps his stomach. Frank, Bobby and Isla are summoned, but Philip dies and Isla cannot revive him.

Isla's parents notice that her healing effect has stopped. As mayor, Bobby calls a meeting to alert the community and suspend visitations, stating that Isla needs rest, but Faye calls for a vote which overrules his decision. Faye extends her influence over the community by organizing a support group, despite experiencing periods of dementia.

Frank and Melissa want help from the mainland for their daughter, and Beau suggests the same for Isla. However, Bobby won't approve this, fearing that Isla would become experimented upon. Beau and Frank decide to escape on a boat Frank is secretly building. Beau brings Isla and Junior a wonder: a working television he had hidden. That night, Grace and Bobby find Isla heals wounds while sleeping. They argue about treating Faye, as Bobby feels Faye is endangering Isla, but Grace is compelled to help her mother escape a demented state.

Beau visits the support group and reminds them of life before Isla arrived, when they were immensely proud of their hard-won accomplishments. They grow nostalgic but become angry when Beau criticizes their dependence on Isla.

The community hasn't caught enough fish to feed themselves through the winter. Faye suggests using decade-old sleeping pills to drug Isla so that she can attract fish while asleep. Bobby is against this and considers leaving the island, but Grace convinces him to wait. Fishing at night, Bobby holds a drugged Isla while Faye and her followers chant "Many thanks to Isla" from the shore. The next day, while the community celebrate the catch, Bobby explains everything to Beau and confides that he needs to escape with his family. Beau reveals that Frank's family are leaving at sunset, offering his and Junior's places.

That evening Beau returns home to find Faye in his kitchen. Discussing their future, she flatly rejects that she will ever return to a demented state. Faye leaves Beau to die from poisoned whiskey. Bobby takes Isla to escape, but Frank and his family departed on seeing a fire blazing at the clinic. The community watch helplessly, Beau's body seen lying within the flames.

The next morning, coast guard officer Lucy arrives with social worker Emily to perform a welfare check on Isla. Emily is reassured until Isla informs her that people are supposed to say "Many thanks to Isla" when they leave. Emily decides to bring the family to the mainland for their safety.

The entire community gathers at the home, becoming unruly when Faye shouts that the family is being kidnapped. Dillon and Lucy aim firearms at each other. Bobby steps between them in an attempt to de-escalate but is shot while protecting Dillon, who fatally shoots Lucy. Faye denies Bobby help until he swears fealty, then prepares to drug Isla. In her room, Isla demands to be told what's happening but Faye and Grace try to force the drugs on her. Junior bursts in with a shotgun taken from the coast guard boat, demanding the truth and accusing Faye of killing Beau. Faye lunges at Junior, who shoots her. Isla screams, her eyes closed.

A few seconds later, Isla opens her fist. As she walks out of the house, it is shown that everyone has fallen dead. She slowly walks through the empty village and watches as multiple coast guard boats speed toward the dock.

== Cast ==
- Clayne Crawford as Bobby
- Lara Jean Chorostecki as Grace, Bobby's wife
- Aden Young as Beau, the island's doctor
- Alix West Lefler as Isla, Bobby and Grace's adoptive daughter
- Michael Greyeyes as Marlon, a fisherman
- Ryan McDonald as Dillon, a fisherman
- Cameron James Nicoll as Junior, Beau's son
- Ben Stranahan as Frank, a fisherman
- Amelia Manuel as Melissa, Frank's wife
- Kathryn Greenwood as Charlotte
- Emily Piggford as Emily, a social worker
- Frances Fisher as Faye, Grace's mother

== Production ==
The science fiction/fantasy film received $655,567 of funding from Telefilm Canada.

The film was directed by Christian Sparkes. It was written by Albert Shin and William Woods, based on a story by Ryan Grassby and Kevin Coughlin.

Portions filmed in Newfoundland and Labrador were shot in fall 2022.

The film was produced by Woods (for Woods Entertainment), Toronto's Resource Films and Newfoundland's Sara Fost Pictures.

== Release ==
The film premiered at the 2023 Toronto International Film Festival (TIFF) on 11 September, as one of twelve entries in the Platform Prize program for films with "unique directorial perspectives". It was also selected for the 28th Busan International Film Festival in the World Cinema section and was screened on 7 October 2023.

It was awarded Best Feature and Best Editor (Justin Oakey) at the 2023 Atlantic International Film Festival in Halifax, Nova Scotia.

The film had gala screenings in St. John's for National Canadian Film Day on 17 April 2024, ahead of a limited theatrical release on 26 April in Canada and the United States. The film was distributed in Canada by VVS Films and internationally by Altitude Films.

== Reception ==
=== Critical response ===
On the review aggregator website Rotten Tomatoes, 95% of 21 critics' reviews are positive, with an average rating of 7.4/10.

Jared Mobarak of The Film Stage wrote:

...with potent performances and a gorgeous, textured aesthetic, The King Tide proves a mesmerizing experience above and below its surface. The camerawork keeps the horrors that unravel mostly to our imagination so we can continue to look at reactions rather than results. The terror here isn't in just how powerful Isla is, but in what an infected groupthink that loses its grip on decency is willing to do in her name to unwittingly push her into discovering the full breadth of those abilities. When is enough finally enough? When does protection become harm? Because the love they all have for Isla isn't for her; it's for the people she's allowed them to become.

Sheri Linden of The Hollywood Reporter wrote:

...whether the characters are forthright or devious, all the performances are in sync with the rugged seclusion of the setting, as is the rustic-meets-old-timey aesthetic of the production design (by Adriana Bogaard) and costumes (Charlotte Reid). Against the wild natural beauty, calls for "solidarity" are coded warnings against dissent, and promises of "a safe place" are, as Beau drunkenly and accurately declares, a load of crap. But whatever punishment he faces, he's made sure to give two wide-eyed kids a glimpse of a bigger world.

=== Nominations and awards ===
The King Tide was nominated for a Canadian Media Producers Association (CMPA) 2023 Indiescreen Award.

Justin Oakey won Best Editing in a Feature Film for The King Tide at the 2024 Canadian Cinema Editors Awards.
