= All Together Now (2008 film) =

2008 rockumentary

- DVD release cover
- Directed by: Adrian Wills
- Starring: John Lennon; Paul McCartney; Ringo Starr; George Harrison; George Martin; Yoko Ono; Olivia Harrison
- Cinematography: Alain Julfayan
- Music by: The Beatles
- Distributed by: Cinema Management Group
- Release date: 20 October 2008
- Running time: 86 minutes
- Countries: Canada; United Kingdom
- Language: English

All Together Now is a 2008 feature-length documentary that chronicles the making of the Beatles and Cirque du Soleil collaboration project Love. The film details the story behind the unique partnership between the Beatles and Cirque du Soleil that resulted in the creation and launch of the Love stage show and the double Grammy-winning album of the same name. The film is dedicated to the memory of Neil Aspinall, a former assistant to the band and eventual head of Apple Corps, who died in March that year.

== Background and release ==
All Together Now recounts how the Love project came into being, borne from the personal friendship between George Harrison and Cirque du Soleil founder Guy Laliberte. George saw how the twin talents of Cirque's artistry and the Beatles' music could be fused into something new and totally original. The title of the DVD refers to the Beatles song "All Together Now".

The director, Adrian Wills, records early meetings between the Cirque & Apple Corps' creative teams, as well as contributions from Paul McCartney, Ringo Starr, Yoko Ono, and Olivia Harrison discussing how the Beatles' music can be used in a different way. The film touches on the decision to utilize the combined talents of George Martin and his son, Giles Martin, to produce what would become a 90-minute soundscape crafted from the Beatles' multi-track recordings. Meanwhile, this new audio project was quietly being worked on at the iconic Abbey Road Studios in London, England, while the initial creative ideas for the show were being developed in Montreal, Canada.

These early stages of the project were all filmed, as were the first rehearsals in the theatre of The Mirage in Las Vegas, which was completely rebuilt with a one-of-a-kind sound system and complex round staging to house the Love show. George and Giles Martin, the show's musical directors, were involved with the Cirque du Soleil creative team, performers and backroom staff.

The DVD won the Grammy Award for Best Long Form Music Video, in 2009, for the director, Adrian Wills, and the producers, Martin Bolduc and Jonathan Clyde. The Beatles did not receive the award as they did not perform in the video. They had, however, received an award in the same category several years earlier for The Beatles Anthology documentary.
