= Inside Bill's Brain: Decoding Bill Gates =

2019 docuseries on Netflix

- Genre: Docuseries
- Created by: Davis Guggenheim
- Directed by: Davis Guggenheim
- Country of origin: United States
- Original language: English
- No. of seasons: 1
- No. of episodes: 3

Production
- Executive producers: Davis Guggenheim; Beth Osisek; Steven Leckart
- Running time: 51-56 minutes

Original release
- Network: Netflix
- Release: September 20, 2019

Inside Bill's Brain: Decoding Bill Gates is a 2019 three-part documentary television series created and directed by Davis Guggenheim. The series explores the mind and motivations of Bill Gates, co-founder and former CEO of Microsoft and founder of the Bill and Melinda Gates Foundation, together with his then-wife Melinda French Gates.

The documentary "toggles between [Gates'] storybook upper-middle-class childhood, the creation of Microsoft, and his current status as the world's second-richest man." The opening sequence features a montage of archive footage, including Gates being caked in Belgium by Noël Godin, while on a visit to European Union officials.

== Cast ==
- Bill Gates
- Melinda Gates
- Kristi Gates, sister of Bill
- Libby Gates, sister of Bill
- Nicholas Kristof
- Warren Buffett
- Vaclav Smil
- Nathan Myhrvold

== Release ==
Inside Bill's Brain: Decoding Bill Gates was released on September 20, 2019, on Netflix. The release came after a summer of "unusually bad press" in which "The New Yorker published emails from the MIT Media Lab suggesting that Gates was "directed" by the sex offender Jeffrey Epstein to donate $2 million to the institution (Gates' representative has pushed back on that characterization), and activists have organized protests and petitions against the Gates Foundation's decision to give Indian Prime Minister Narendra Modi a humanitarian award."

== Episodes ==
=== Episode 1: Sanitation ===
The first episode explores Gates's interest in improving sanitation in developing countries and the development of the "Omni Processor". His two sisters share their childhood memories.

The Omni Processor is treating 1/3 of the fecal sludge in Dakar, Senegal; it also produces potable water.

In November 2018, the Lixil Group announced that it would develop one of Bill's toilets.

=== Episode 2 ===
Bill is seeking access to the source code of the PDP-10 computer.

Kent Evans, a teenage computer expert and friend of Bill Gates dies in an accident in 1972.

The second episode focuses on Gates' work to eradicate polio in Nigeria and advance polio vaccination, also exploring his youth and friendships, for example with Kent Evans and with Paul Allen, later the Microsoft co-founder.

=== Episode 3 ===
The third episode explores Gates' search for climate change solutions. This includes the development of a novel travelling-wave nuclear power reactor, under development by TerraPower, a nuclear reactor design company founded by Gates. In addition to exploring Bill's relationship and marriage with Melinda Gates, the third episode also details his friendship with fellow billionaire Warren Buffett and the antitrust law case in 1998-2001, using original footage from the trial. In this trial, the U.S. government accused Microsoft of illegally maintaining its monopoly position in the PC market (see United States v. Microsoft Corp.).

== Reviews ==
One review in 2019 said "Inside Bill's Brain often feels more superficial than it actually is because it switches topics so freely". Much of this documentary is about his charity work with the Bill and Melinda Gates Foundation, not about his life, personality, or beliefs. The same review said the second episode is the best one as it comes closest to "decoding" Gates.

According to The Nation, "The documentary's blind spots are all the more striking in light of the timing of its release, just as news was trickling out that Bill Gates met multiple times with convicted sex offender Jeffrey Epstein." The documentary features an interview with Bernie Noe, a friend of Gates, but "Guggenheim doesn't tell audiences that Noe is the principal of Lakeside School, a private institution to which the Bill & Melinda Gates Foundation has given $80 million. The filmmaker also doesn't mention the extraordinary conflict of interest this presents: The Gateses used their charitable foundation to enrich the private school their children attend."
