= Sweetland (film) =

2023 Canadian drama film

- Film poster
- Directed by: Christian Sparkes
- Written by: Michael Crummey; Christian Sparkes
- Based on: Sweetland by Michael Crummey
- Produced by: Allison White
- Starring: Mark Lewis Jones; Sara Canning; Mary Walsh
- Cinematography: Jordan Kennington
- Edited by: Jorge Weisz
- Music by: Andrew Staniland
- Production company: Sara Fost Pictures
- Release date: September 15, 2023 (AIFF)
- Running time: 105 minutes
- Country: Canada
- Language: English

Sweetland is a 2023 Canadian drama film, co-written and directed by Christian Sparkes. Adapted from the novel of the same name by Michael Crummey, the film stars Mark Lewis Jones as Moses, a retired fisherman who refuses to leave the isolated Newfoundland and Labrador outport town of Sweetland when the provincial government launches a resettlement initiative.

Production on the film was first announced in 2020.

The film premiered on September 15 at the 2023 Atlantic International Film Festival, and received a gala screening at the 2023 Cinéfest Sudbury International Film Festival on September 19.

== Cast ==
- Mark Lewis Jones as Moses
- Sara Canning as Clara
- Mary Walsh as Queenie
- Lawrence Barry as Loveless
- Andy Jones as Duke
- Amelia Manuel as Sandra
- Darryl Hopkins as Government Man
- Cail Turner as Jesse
- Frank Holden as Pilgrim

== Awards ==
Sparkes won the awards for Best Atlantic Canadian Director and Best Atlantic Screenwriting at AIFF.
