= Adrian Wills =

Canadian film director

Adrian Wills is a Canadian film and television director from Montreal, Quebec, most noted for his documentary films All Together Now and A Quiet Girl.

== Early life ==
Born in Newfoundland and Labrador, he was placed for adoption and grew up in Montreal.

== Career ==
Wills directed a number of short films before making his documentary debut with Entre les mains De Michel Tremblay in 2006. He then collaborated with Cirque du Soleil on All Together Now, which was released in 2008. He has since collaborated with Cirque du Soleil on filmed versions of other Cirque shows, including Touch the Sky (Toucher le ciel), Michael Jackson: The Immortal World Tour, Toruk – The First Flight and Luzia.

In 2017 he was a co-creator of the television series 21 Thunder.

A Quiet Girl, released in 2023, centred on his efforts to find out more information about his adoption and birth family. The film premiered at the 2023 Atlantic International Film Festival.

In 2024 he was co-director with Sylvain Lebel of Leonard Cohen: If It Be Your Will, a television documentary special which blended historical interviews with writer and singer Leonard Cohen with performances of Cohen's songs from the 2017 Tower of Song Cohen tribute concert.

== Awards ==
Award	Date of ceremony	Category	Work	Result	Ref.
Directors Guild of Canada	2024	Allan King Award for Best Documentary Film	A Quiet Girl	Nominated	
Gémeaux Awards	2009	Best Documentary: Culture	All Together Now	Won	
Grammy Awards	2010	Best Music Film	All Together Now	Won	
