= A Quiet Girl =

2024 Canadian documentary film

- Directed by: Adrian Wills
- Written by: Adrian Wills
- Produced by: Annette Clarke
- Cinematography: Van Royko
- Edited by: Heidi Haines
- Music by: Tim Baker
- Production company: National Film Board of Canada
- Release date: September 19, 2023 (AIFF)
- Running time: 86 minutes
- Country: Canada
- Language: English

A Quiet Girl is a Canadian documentary film, directed by Adrian Wills and released in 2023. The film documents Wills's own quest to learn more about the life of his birth mother, who placed him for adoption in 1972 but later died aged 45 before Wills ever had a chance to meet her.

The film premiered at the 2023 Atlantic International Film Festival, and was later screened at the Rendez-vous Québec Cinéma.

It was a nominee for the DGC Allan King Award for Best Documentary Film at the 2024 Directors Guild of Canada awards.
