= Swirl (film) =

2011 film

- Film poster
- Directed by: Clarissa Campolina; Helvécio Marins Jr.
- Written by: Felipe Bragança
- Starring: Maria Sebastian Martins Alvaro
- Cinematography: Ivo Lopes Araújo
- Release date: 14 September 2011 (Toronto)
- Running time: 90 minutes
- Country: Brazil
- Language: Portuguese

Swirl (Portuguese: Girimunho) is a 2011 Brazilian drama film directed by Clarissa Campolina and Helvécio Marins Jr.

== Cast ==
- Maria Sebastian Martins Alvaro
- Luciene Soares da Silva
- Wanderson Soares da Silva
- Maria da Conceição Gomes de Moura
