= Mandeep =

- Gender: Unisex

Origin
- Meaning: 1. mind full of light; 2. light of the mind; 3. enlightened
- Region of origin: South Asia

Other names
- Alternative spelling: Mandip

Mandeep or Mandip is a given name, commonly given to individuals of Hindu and Sikh background. It means "enlightened", "mind full of light", "light of the mind", or "light of heart and mind".

== Notable people ==
Notable people with the given name include:

- Mandeep Antil (born 1989), Indian field hockey player
- Mandeep Benipal, Indian film director
- Mandeep Dhaliwal, Canadian politician
- Mandeep Dhillon (born 1990), British actress
- Mandeep Jangra (born 1993), Indian amateur boxer
- Mandeep Kaur (athlete) (born 1988), Indian athlete
- Mandeep Kaur (cricketer) (born 1988), Indian cricketer
- Mandeep R. Mehra (born 1964), professor at Harvard Medical School
- Mandeep Roy, Indian film actor
- Mandeep Singh (born 1991), Indian cricketer
- Mandeep Singh (field hockey) (born 1995), Indian field hockey player
- Mandip Gill (born 1988), English actress
- Mandip Sehmi (born 1980), British wheelchair rugby player
- Mandip Singh Soin (born 1957), Indian mountaineer
