= Swirl (organization) =

Swirl is an American anti-racist grassroots organization, incorporated in 2000, that serves the mixed heritage community. It aims to develop a national consciousness of mixed heritage issues to empower members to organize and take action towards progressive social change. There are currently chapters in New York City, Boston, and the San Francisco Bay Area.

Swirl has worked to increase voter participation and knowledge about legislation affecting the mixed heritage community. Is also maintains an email listserv which disseminates information relevant to the mixed heritage community.
