= Christian Sparkes =

Canadian film director and screenwriter

- Born: St. John's, Newfoundland and Labrador, Canada
- Occupations: Film director; Screenwriter; Film producer; Film editor

Christian Sparkes is a Canadian film director and screenwriter from St. John's, Newfoundland and Labrador. He is most noted for his film Cast No Shadow, which was a Canadian Screen Award nominee for Best Picture at the 3rd Canadian Screen Awards in 2015.

An alumnus of the Canadian Film Centre, Sparkes directed several short films before releasing Cast No Shadow as his feature debut in 2014. The film premiered at the 2014 Atlantic Film Festival, where it received awards from the festival for Best Atlantic Feature, Best Director, Best Screenplay, Best Actress, Best Actor and Best Cinematography.

His second feature film, Hammer, premiered at the 2019 Whistler Film Festival before going into commercial release in 2020. His third feature film, The King Tide, was shot in 2022, and premiered in the Platform Prize program at the 2023 Toronto International Film Festival.

In 2020, he was announced as the director of a film adaptation of Michael Crummey's novel Sweetland. The completed film, Sweetland, premiered at the 2023 Atlantic International Film Festival.

== Filmography ==
=== Features ===
- Cast No Shadow (2014)
- Hammer (2019)
- The King Tide (2023)
- Sweetland (2023)

=== Short films ===
- A Foot of Rope (2005)
- Ten Days (2009)
- Black Clouds (2010)
- A River in the Woods (2011)
- The Offering (2012)
