= Afternoon Tea =

Painting by Richard E. Miller

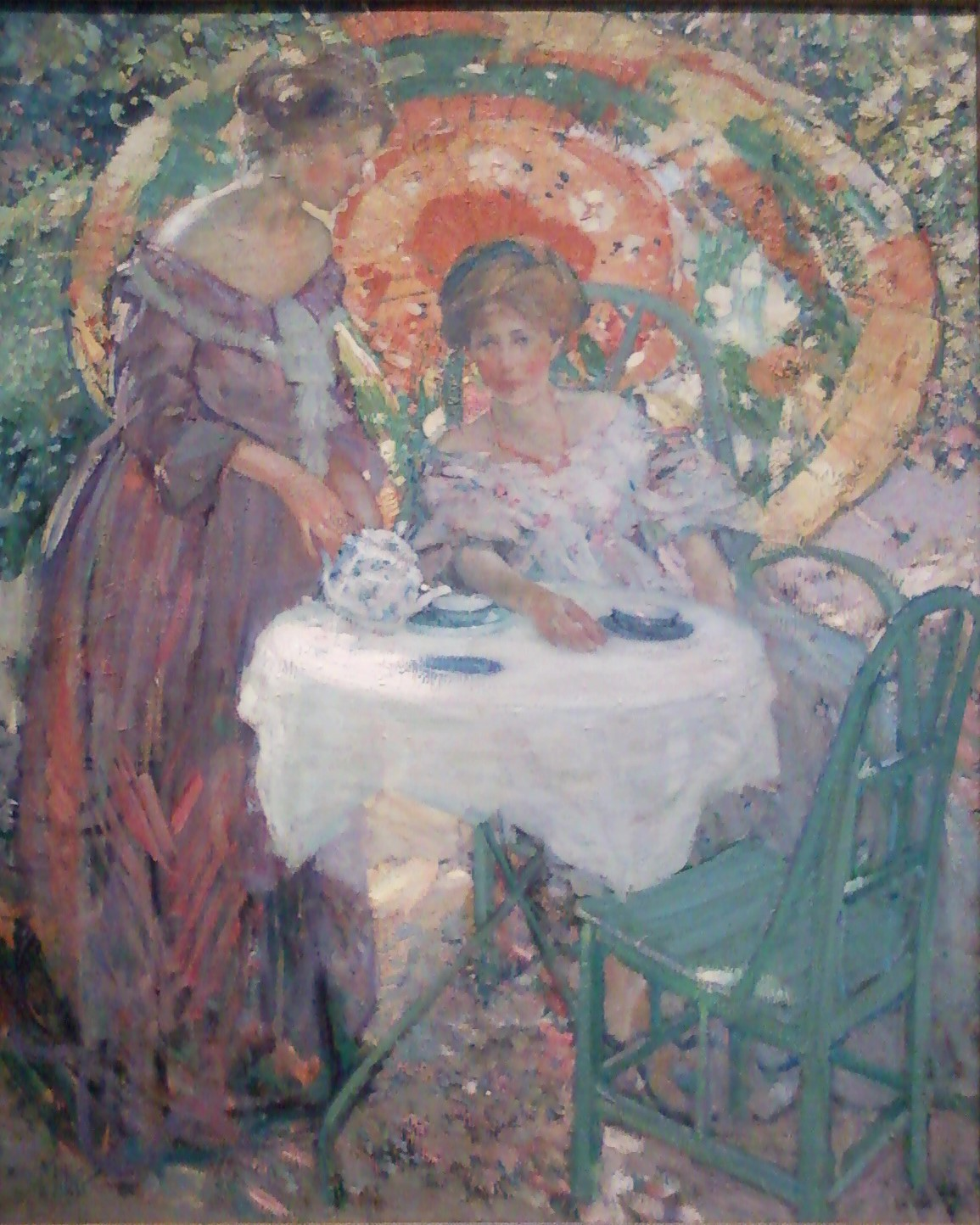
- Artist: Richard E. Miller
- Year: 1910
- Type: Oil paint on canvas
- Dimensions: 100 cm × 81 cm (39.5 in × 32 in)
- Location: Indianapolis Museum of Art, Indianapolis

Afternoon Tea is a 1910 oil painting by American artist Richard E. Miller, located in the Indianapolis Museum of Art. Like many of Miller's paintings, it depicts women in a sunny scene, filled with flowers, depicted in his Impressionist style with a distinct flavor of Japonism.

== Description ==
Afternoon Tea has been lauded as one of Miller's best paintings, "a confident, mature work and an absolute knockout in coloristic power." He applied vibrant colors like bright reds, greens, and purples with artistic license, driven by decorative concerns rather than objective truth. By framing the two women with a Japanese parasol, Miller created a focal point that unified the disparate colors, patterns, and textures he juxtaposed so boldly, a hallmark of his particular style of Impressionism. The parasol was a device Miller would use over and over again, enamored of its "circular shape, ribbed structure, [and] colorful surface designs." The prominent brushstrokes are also a key feature of Miller's mature works.

== Historical information ==
This painting was produced when Miller was at an important artistic crossroads, shifting from academic portraits to more animated images of contemporary women. The real subject, though, was paint itself, and the joy he derived from its manipulation.

Miller was a member of the Giverny Group, a group of American Impressionists who settled in Northern France to be near Claude Monet. They preferred to produce paintings of women in sun-drenched landscapes, emphasizing bold contrasts and patterns. They, Miller included, embraced whole-heartedly the mania for Japanese aesthetics that swept France at the turn of the twentieth century. He filled his studio with fans, kimonos, ceramics, and other souvenirs. World War I dislodged them from the region; Miller returned to America in 1914.

=== Acquisition ===
Afternoon Tea was vigorously pursued by IMA curator Ellen Lee to flesh out the museum's American Impressionism collection. Her research confirmed that it was a long-lost Miller masterpiece mentioned in the artist's scrapbook but not seen for years. Thus, she convinced IMA benefactors Jane and Andrew Paine to bid on it on December 4, 1997, at Christie's New York auction house, in the middle of an exciting week that also saw the museum acquire an important (and costly) Belgian Neo-Impressionist painting and an early Netherlandish triptych. The final price was $1,047,500, considerably higher than the initial estimate of $500,000–$700,000. It is currently on view as a promised gift in the American gallery with the accession number 1997.139.

== See also ==
- Tea culture
