= Marusya Bociurkiw =

Canadian film-maker, scholar and writer

- Born: May 25, 1958 (age 68); Edmonton, Alberta, Canada
- Known for: Film-maker, writer, media studies scholar
- Notable work: Comfort Food for Breakups (2007), This is Gay Propaganda: LGBT Rights and the War in Ukraine (2015)

Marusya Bociurkiw (born May 25, 1958) is a Canadian born filmmaker, writer, scholar, and curator. She has published six books, including a novel, poetry collection, short story collection, and two food memoirs. Her narrative and critical writing have been published in a variety of magazines, journals and collections, like Fuse Magazine, The Globe & Mail, Now Magazine and Rabble.ca. Bociurkiw has also directed and co-directed eleven films and videos which have been screened at film festivals on several continents. Her work appears in the collections of the National Gallery of Canada, the National Archives of Canada, and many university libraries. She founded or co-founded the media organizations Emma Productions, and Winds of Change Productions. She currently lives in Toronto, Ontario, Canada where she is professor emeritus at Toronto Metropolitan University (previously Ryerson University). She is the founding director of The Studio for Media Activism & Critical Thought at Toronto Metropolitan University.

== Early years ==
Bociurkiw was born in Edmonton, Alberta to Vera Anne (née Wasylyshyn) and Bohdan Rostyslav Bociurkiw. Her father was co-founder of the Canadian Institute of Ukrainian Studies, among other organizations; a longtime academic and organizer with a significant impact in his field. Ukrainian history and culture were central to Bociurkiw's childhood, and instilled in her a sense of Ukrainian identity and history, as well as a desire to critically rewrite that history. This is a common thread throughout Bociurkiw's books, essays, and films: reflecting poetically and intersectionally on what it means to be Ukrainian, Canadian, feminist, and queer. Ksenya Kiebuzinski, of the Petro Jacyk program for the Study of Ukraine at the Munk School of Global Affairs, has said that Bociurkiw's work brings awareness of the diversity that exists within Ukraine. "She's changing people's attitudes," said Kiebuzinski, in an article in Ryerson University's The Eyeopener.

== Education and career ==
Bociurkiw completed her Bachelor of Fine Arts (1982) at the Nova Scotia College of Art and Design (NSCAD) University. While there, she discovered feminist art and the new field of video art. She was part of what Bruce Barber has called "the gathering momentum of a feminist movement at NSCAD", co-founding the Women Artists' File at the NSCAD Library, which later inspired the Toronto-based Women's Art Resource Centre. She was active on the board of the Centre for Art Tapes in Halifax, where she curated a Toronto-Halifax exchange of activist performance art entitled "Performance As Resistance" (1985), which featured dub poets Lillian Allen and Clifton Joseph, and others.

After graduating from NSCAD, she moved to Toronto and in 1983, collectively produced the documentary, Our Choice, A Tape About Teenage Mothers (Women's Media Alliance). In 1984, she co-founded the feminist video collective, Emma Productions, which produced several works, including No Small Change: The Story of the Eaton's Strike (dir. Ruth Bishop & Marusya Bociurkiw 1985) and Bullets for a Revolution (dir. Marusya Bociurkiw 1988). These films were produced and screened in the context of the dynamic feminist media culture in 1980's Toronto. No Small Change: The Story of the Eaton's Strike and Bociurkiw's own film Playing with Fire (1986) were included in a 1989-1990 touring exhibition called Rebel Girls: A Survey of Canadian Feminist Videotapes 1974-1988. These were followed by several more single-authored works, including Unspoken Territory, about the history of racial profiling in Canada; and the more recent This is Gay Propaganda: LGBT Rights and the War in Ukraine (2015). This film uses interviews with LGBT Ukrainians to explore the role of queer activists in Ukraine's Euromaidan Revolution and the Russian occupation that followed. Her most recent feature-length documentary, Analogue Revolution: How Feminist Media Changed the World (2023) examines how analogue technologies propelled important social movements, including second wave feminism. Bociurkiw's films have screened at film festivals and won awards on several continents.

Bociurkiw's narrative and critical writing have been widely published in such journals and collections as Border/Lines, Rites Magazine, The Journey Prize Anthology (McClelland & Stewart), Dykewords (Women's Press), Queer Looks (Routledge), Two Lands, New Vision (Coteau) and Unbound: Ukrainian Canadians Writing Home (University of Toronto Press). In 1994, Bociurkiw published her first book, The Woman Who Loved Airports (Press Gang) a collection of short stories, followed by a poetry collection, Halfway to the East (Lazara Press 1999). Bociurkiw's creative and scholarly careers have always been intertwined. While teaching sessional positions, completing a PhD in Interdisciplinary Studies at the University of British Columbia (2005) and later working as a professor in the Radio and Television Arts (RTA) School of Media, Toronto Metropolitan University, formerly Ryerson (2007 to present), she completed her first novel, The Children of Mary (Inanna 2006), and her award-winning memoir, Comfort Food for Breakups (Arsenal 2007). In 2011, she published the academic book, Feeling Canadian: Television Nationalism & Affect (Wilfrid Laurier University Press).

During her time at TMU, Bociurkiw made space for feminist, queer, and anti-racist pedagogy and research through the Studio for Media Activism & Critical Thought, a research hub at Ryerson University that blurs the boundaries between media art, activism, and scholarly investigation, co-organizing dozens of radical research creation events like a Death Café, a feminist gaming workshop, and a panel with the Nunavut-based Arnait Video Productions women's production company. Its annual Laboratory of Feminist Memory Cabaret, held offsite at Glad Day Bookshop, was an landmark event that mobilized feminist research and cultural work both within and beyond the university. She created some of Ryerson's first social justice focused courses that examined activist media production, and gender/race/queer theories of time-based and digital media.

== Activism ==
Bociurkiw was active in the Toronto and Vancouver feminist movement, peace, and LGBT social movements. She was involved with Women's Action for Peace, International Women's Day Coalition, the pro-choice movement, the Latin American solidarity movement, Women for Economic Justice, and the artist-run scene. While living in Montreal, she co-taught the first course on LGBT cinema in Canada, at Concordia University, with Thomas Waugh. She was among the first group of women in Canada to enter the male-dominated field of media art, and to use film and video to draw attention to women's, labour and other issues.

Bociurkiw's 2015 film—This is Gay Propaganda: LGBT Rights and the War in Ukraine—highlights the role of LGBT activists in the 2013 Euromaidan and 2014 Ukrainian revolution, which culminated in the expulsion of Ukrainian President Viktor Yanukovych. LGBT people in Ukraine had a lot to lose from the rise of Russian political influences there. As a result of the illegal occupation and annexation of Crimea by the Russian Federation in 2014—bringing it under the Russian LGBT propaganda law—many LGBT Ukrainians from Crimea and Donetsk were forced to flee to safe houses in Kyiv and Odesa. Bociurkiw's film was among the first to draw attention to this struggle and gives voice to the heroes of the Ukrainian LGBT rights movement.

In 2016, she published the article "Big Affect: The Ephemeral Archive of Second Wave Feminist Video Collectives in Canada," the result of several years' research into Canadian feminist media history and its intersections with broadcast technologies and activism. She also, with Dr Elena Marchevska of South Bank University London, initiated an international research project analyzing the complex intersection between forced migration and new place-making strategies through art, called Project Finding Home. Her research and curation is ongoing, with the dissemination of the film Analogue Revolution, and the curation of a film/video series, "This Is the Feminist Archive" (2024–25), screening experimental feminist works from the late 20th century in independent venues in Toronto.

== Works ==
=== Literary works ===
Marusya Bociurkiw's work is "cast with stark, memorable details that capture the conflicting essence of families". Her books examine "complex relationships and histories."

- The Woman Who Loved Airports (Press Gang Publishers, 1994)
- Halfway to the East (Lazara Press, 1999)
- The Children of Mary (Inanna Publications, 2006)
- Comfort Food for Breakups: The Memoir of a Hungry Girl (Arsenal Pulp Press, 2007)
- Feeling Canadian: Television Nationalism & Affect (Wilfrid Laurier University Press, 2011)
- Food Was Her Country: The Memoir of a Queer Daughter (Dagger Editions / Caitlin Press 2018)
- Recipes for Trouble: A World of Food Stories, Culinary Memories, and Ingredients Queerly Political (2012–2013)
- The Media Studies Blog (rabble.ca, 2010–2014)
- A Girl, Waiting (2015)
- Bringing Back Memory in Unbound: Ukrainian Canadians Writing Home (University of Toronto Press, 2016)

=== Films ===
- Our Choice, A Tape About Teenage Mothers (Vtape, 1983)
- Stronger than Before (Vtape, 1984)
- No Small Change (Vtape, 1985)
- Playing With Fire (Vtape, 1986)
- Bullets for a Revolution (Vtape, 1988)
- Night Visions (Vtape, 1989)
- Bodies in Trouble (Vtape, 1990)
- Nancy Drew & the Mystery of the Haunted Body (Vtape, 1999)
- Unspoken Territory (Moving Images Distribution, 2001)
- Flesh and Blood:A Journey Between East and West or What's the Ukrainian Word for Sex? (Moving Images Distribution, 2006)
- This is Gay Propaganda: LGBT Rights and the War in Ukraine (Winds of Change Production, 2015)
- Analogue Revolution: How Feminist Media Changed the World (Winds of Change Productions, 2023)

== Awards ==
Bociurkiw's memoir, Comfort Food for Breakups: The Memoir of a Hungry Girl, received Foreword Magazine's INDIEFAB Book of the Year Award (2007), the Independent Publisher Book Awards (silver) for Best Autobiography/Memoir (2008); and was short-listed for the Golden Crown Literary Award, Lesbian Short Story Essay Collection, and the prestigious Kobzar Literary Award and the Lambda Literary Award (2008). Bociurkiw was the 2013 recipient of the Deans' Scholarly, Research and Creative Activity Award at Ryerson University. Her short story, "A Girl, Waiting," was short-listed for the 2015 CBC Creative Non-Fiction Award. The anthology Unbound: Ukrainian Canadians Writing Home, which included her story"Bringing Back Memory" won a 2018 Kobzar Award. Her memoir Food Was Her Country was shortlisted for a 2019 Lambda Award.

The film Analogue Revolution has won several awards, including the Prix de Publique at the Image+Nation Festival, Montreal 2023, and the Spirit of Activism Award at the Nevada Women's Film Festival, 2024, and was a Canadian Screen Award nominee for Best Feature Length Documentary at the 13th Canadian Screen Awards in 2025.
