= The Other Side of Sleep =

2011 Irish-Dutch film

- Theatrical film poster
- Directed by: Rebecca Daly
- Written by: Rebecca Daly; Glenn Montgomery
- Produced by: Morgan Bushe; Macdara Kelleher
- Starring: Antonia Campbell-Hughes; Cathy Belton; Sam Keeley; Olwen Fouéré; Gina Moxley; Aaron Monaghan
- Cinematography: Suzie Lavelle
- Edited by: Halina Daugird
- Music by: Marc Lizier; Michel Schöpping
- Release dates: May 13, 2011 (Cannes); March 15, 2012 (Ireland)
- Running time: 88 mins.
- Countries: Ireland; Netherlands
- Language: English

The Other Side of Sleep is a 2011 Irish-Dutch mystery-drama film, directed by Rebecca Daly, who also co-wrote the screenplay with Glenn Montgomery. It stars Antonia Campbell-Hughes, Olwen Fouéré, Sam Keeley, Cathy Belton, Aaron Monaghan, and Gina Moxley. It premiered at the Cannes Film Festival in 2011, before being released in Ireland in 2012.

== Synopsis ==
Arlene lives in a small town in the Midlands. One morning, she wakes in the woods beside the body of a young woman, which is soon discovered. Suspicion spreads through the community and Arlene barricades herself in at night, afraid to sleep.

== Cast ==
- Antonia Campbell-Hughes as Arlene Kelly
- Sam Keeley as Killen
- Olwen Fouéré as Maggie
- Cathy Belton as Selina
- Aaron Monaghan as Bill
- Gina Moxley as Francie
- Vicky Joyce as Donna
- Zsuzsa Varga as Gina

== Reception ==
Fionnuala Halligan of Screen Daily lauded Antonia Campbell-Hughes and Sam Keeley for their "affecting performances". Todd Brown of ScreenAnarchy called the film "a hazy sort of fever dream" in a positive review. Estudios Irlandeses also praised Olwen Fouéré for her "minor but forceful role".

However, David Rooney of The Hollywood Reporter criticized filmmakers Rebecca Daly and Glenn Montgomery for "deliberately avoiding suspense" and being "too opaque". David Ondechek of Horror News chided the film for "having a lack of dialogue". And Blake Williams opined that it wants "to be the next big thing in austere cinema, but this snoozer lies squarely in the 'pretender' pad".
