= 2023 Atlantic International Film Festival =

Canadian film festival

- Opening film: The Queen of My Dreams by Fawzia Mirza
- Closing film: Flora and Son by John Carney
- Location: Halifax, Nova Scotia, Canada
- Founded: 1980
- Festival date: September 14–21, 2023
- Website: atlanticfilmfestival.ca

Atlantic International Film Festival
- 2024 2022

The 2023 edition of the Atlantic International Film Festival, the 43rd edition in the event's history, took place from September 14 to 21, 2023 in Halifax, Nova Scotia, Canada.

Some screenings at the festival were disrupted by Tropical Storm Lee, but the festival was not cancelled and all affected screenings were rescheduled for another time. Following the conclusion of the official in-person festival, the Atlantic Canadian films from the program were also made available on a dedicated streaming platform for three additional days to help publicize the films in the rest of the region.

== Awards ==
Award	Film	Recipient
Gordon Parsons Award for Best Atlantic Canadian Feature	The King Tide	Christian Sparkes
Best Atlantic Canadian Director	Sweetland	Christian Sparkes
Joan Orenstein & David Renton Award for Outstanding Performance in Acting	Mother's Skin	Briar Ainslie
Joan Orenstein & David Renton Award for Outstanding Performance in Acting	Who's Yer Father?	Susan Kent
Best Atlantic Documentary	Celestial Queer: The Life, Work and Wonder of James MacSwain	Erin Foster, Sue Johnson
Best Atlantic Short Documentary	Songs of Unama'ki	Dawn Wells, Jeff Miller
Best Atlantic Short Film	Mother's Skin	Leah Johnston
Best Atlantic Short Film, Honorable Mention	Father Archie	Todd Fraser
Michael Weir Award for Best Atlantic Screenwriting	Sweetland	Christian Sparkes
Best Atlantic Cinematographer	Mitata (Grandfather)	Desmond Simon
Best Atlantic Editor	The King Tide	Justin Oakey
Best Atlantic Original Score	Evelyn	Devon Ross

== Official selections ==
=== Gala Presentations ===
English title	Original title	Director(s)	Production country
Flora and Son		John Carney	United States, Ireland
The Queen of My Dreams		Fawzia Mirza	Canada
Sweetland		Christian Sparkes	Canada

=== Reel East Coast Shorts ===
English title	Original title	Director(s)	Province
Escape the Usual		Colby Conrad	Nova Scotia
Evelyn		Millefiore Clarkes	Prince Edward Island
Father Archie		Todd Fraser	New Brunswick
The Healing Jar		Andreas Cass	Newfoundland and Labrador
Hebron Relocation		Holly Anderson	Newfoundland and Labrador
Mother's Skin		Leah Johnston	Nova Scotia
Slay		Kevin Hartford	Nova Scotia

=== Narrative New Waves ===
English title	Original title	Director(s)	Production country
Backspot		D. W. Waterson	Canada
Banel & Adama	Banel et Adama	Ramata-Toulaye Sy	France, Senegal, Mali
Boca Chica		Gabriella Athena Moses	Dominican Republic
Doubles		Ian Harnarine	Canada
Humanist Vampire Seeking Consenting Suicidal Person	Vampire humaniste cherche suicidaire consentant	Ariane Louis-Seize	Canada
I Used to Be Funny		Ally Pankiw	Canada
In Flames		Zarrar Kahn	Canada
Richelieu		Pier-Philippe Chevigny	Canada
Seagrass		Meredith Hama-Brown	Canada
The Settlers	Los Colonos	Felipe Gálvez Haberle	Chile, Argentina, France, Denmark, United Kingdom, Taiwan, Sweden, Germany
With Love and a Major Organ		Kim Albright	Canada

=== World Cinema ===
English title	Original title	Director(s)	Production country
About Dry Grasses	Kuru Otlar Üstüne	Nuri Bilge Ceylan	Turkey, France, Germany, Sweden
Anatomy of a Fall	Anatomie d'une chute	Justine Triet	France
La Chimera		Alice Rohrwacher	Italy, France, Switzerland
Close to You		Dominic Savage	Canada, United Kingdom
Days of Happiness	Les Jours heureux	Chloé Robichaud	Canada
The Delinquents	Los delincuentes	Rodrigo Moreno	Argentina, Brazil, Luxembourg, Chile
Fallen Leaves	Kuolleet lehdet	Aki Kaurismäki	Finland, Germany
Fitting In		Molly McGlynn	Canada
The King Tide		Christian Sparkes	Canada
Monster	怪物	Hirokazu Kore-eda	Japan
The Old Oak		Ken Loach	United Kingdom, France, Belgium
Perfect Days		Wim Wenders	Japan
The Promised Land	Bastarden	Nikolaj Arcel	Denmark
Red, White & Brass		Damon Fepulea'i	New Zealand
Seven Veils		Atom Egoyan	Canada
Suze		Dane Clark, Linsey Stewart	Canada
Tautuktavuk (What We See)		Carol Kunnuk, Lucy Tulugarjuk	Canada
Tótem		Lila Avilés	Mexico, Denmark, France
Who's Yer Father?		Jeremy Larter	Canada

=== Late Night Visions ===
English title	Original title	Director(s)	Production country
Deliver Us		Cru Ennis, Lee Roy Kunz	United States
Raging Grace		Paris Zarcilla	United Kingdom
Red Rooms	Les Chambres rouges	Pascal Plante	Canada

=== Classics Restored & In Focus ===
English title	Original title	Director(s)	Production country
The Grand Seduction		Don McKellar	Canada
John and the Missus		Gordon Pinsent	Canada
Life Classes		William D. MacGillivray	Canada
The Mother and the Whore	La maman et la putain	Jean Eustache	France

=== Documentaries ===
English title	Original title	Director(s)	Production country
Against the Tide		Sarvnik Kaur	India
Analogue Revolution: How Feminist Media Changed the World		Marusya Bociurkiw	Canada
Celestial Queer: The Life, Work and Wonder of James MacSwain		Sue Johnson, Eryn Foster	Canada
The Elephant 6 Recording Co,		C.B. Stockfleth	United States
I Lost My Mom	J'ai placé ma mère	Denys Desjardins	Canada
In the Quiet and the Dark		Nance Ackerman	Canada
Innocence		Guy Davidi	Denmark, Finland, Iceland, Israel
Invisible Beauty		Bethann Hardison, Frédéric Tcheng	United States
Mr. Dressup: The Magic of Make-Believe		Robert McCallum	Canada
Orlando, My Political Biography	Orlando, ma biographie politique	Paul B. Preciado	France
A Quiet Girl		Adrian Wills	Canada
Smoke Sauna Sisterhood	Savvusanna sõsarad	Anna Hints	Estonia, France, Iceland
Someone Lives Here		Zack Russell	Canada
Songs of Unama'ki		Dawn Wells, Jeff Miller	Canada
Stolen Time		Helene Klodawsky	Canada
Swan Song		Chelsea McMullan	Canada
Unsyncable		Megan Wennberg	Canada

=== Shorts ===
English title	Original title	Director(s)	Production country
6 Minutes per Kilometre	6 minutes/km	Catherine Boivin	Canada
27		Flóra Anna Buda	France, Hungary
48 Hours		Azadeh Moussavi	Iran
All the Days of May	Tous les jours de mai	Miryam Charles	Canada
Aphasia	Aphasie	Marielle Dalpé	Canada
Atlantis		Zoé Pelchat	Canada
Blueberries for Iris		Zoe Cleland	Canada
Carnaval		Justine Martin	Canada
Daughter of the Sea		Nicole Gormley, Nancy Kwon	United States
Electra		Daria Kashcheeva	Czech Republic, France, Slovakia
Entrée		Akshay Shirke	Canada
Favourite Only Child		Juliette Poitras	Canada
The Gaze		Stacy Gardner	Canada
Gold and Mud		Conor Dooley	United States
Human Resources	Ressources humaines	Trinidad Plass, Titouan Tillier, Isaac Wenzek	France
I Have No Tears and I Must Cry		Luis Fernando Puente	United States
I Promise You Paradise	Paradis	Morad Mostafa	France, Egypt, Qatar
In Between		Clara Prévost	Canada
In the Garden of Tulips		Julia Elihu	United States
Joie de vivre		Dada	Canada
Klette		Michael Abay	Belgium
A Love Letter to Léopold L. Foulem	Lettre d’amour à Léopold L. Foulem	Renée Blanchar	Canada
Madeleine		Raquel Sancinetti	Canada
Mamita		Luis Molinié	Canada
Mickey		Stevey Hunter	Canada
The Miracle		Nienke Deutz	Belgium
Miserable Miracle		Ryo Orikas	Canada
Miss Campbell: Inuk Teacher		Heather Campbell	Canada
Mitata (Grandfather)		Desmond Simon	Canada
Modern Goose		Karsten Wall	Canada
Nun or Never!		Heta Jäälinoja	Finland
Payback		Jesse Harley	Canada
The Score 97.9		Violet Shoshana Pask	Canada
Shallots and Garlic	Bawang Merah Bawang Putih	Andrea Nirmala Widjajanto	Canada
Signal and Noise		Jess Shane, Katie Matthews	Canada
The Skates	Les Patins	Halima Ouardiri	Canada
Starry-Eyed		Emma MacCabe	Canada
Summer 96	Été 96	Mathilde Bédouet	France
Summer of 2000	Été 2000	Virginie Nolin, Laurence Olivier	Canada
Things Unheard Of		Ramazan Kilic	Turkey
Thriving: A Dissociated Reverie		Nicole Bazuin	Canada
Two Apples		Bahram Javahery	Canada
The Vacation		Jarreau Carrillo	United States
The Waves		Young Yumi	South Korea
Wolf		Kathleen Dorian	Canada
