= Ian Harnarine =

Canadian film director and screenwriter

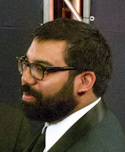
- Ian Harnarine, Genie Awards 2012
- Occupation: film director

Ian Harnarine is a Canadian film director and screenwriter. He is best known for his 2011 short film Doubles with Slight Pepper, which won the Genie Award for Best Live Action Short Drama at the 32nd Genie Awards in 2012.

Born and raised in Toronto to immigrant parents from Trinidad and Tobago, Harnarine studied physics and astronomy at York University and the University of Illinois before pursuing a film degree at New York University. While studying at NYU, he took classes under Spike Lee, who was credited as the executive producer on Doubles with Slight Pepper. The film also won the award for Best Canadian Short Film at the 2011 Toronto International Film Festival.

He subsequently went into development on a feature film version Doubles with Slight Pepper. Doubles premiered at the 2023 Atlantic International Film Festival, before going into commercial release in 2024.

His second feature film is slated to be an adaptation of David Chariandy's novel Soucouyant.
