= Wanda Perdelwitz =

German actress (1984–2025)

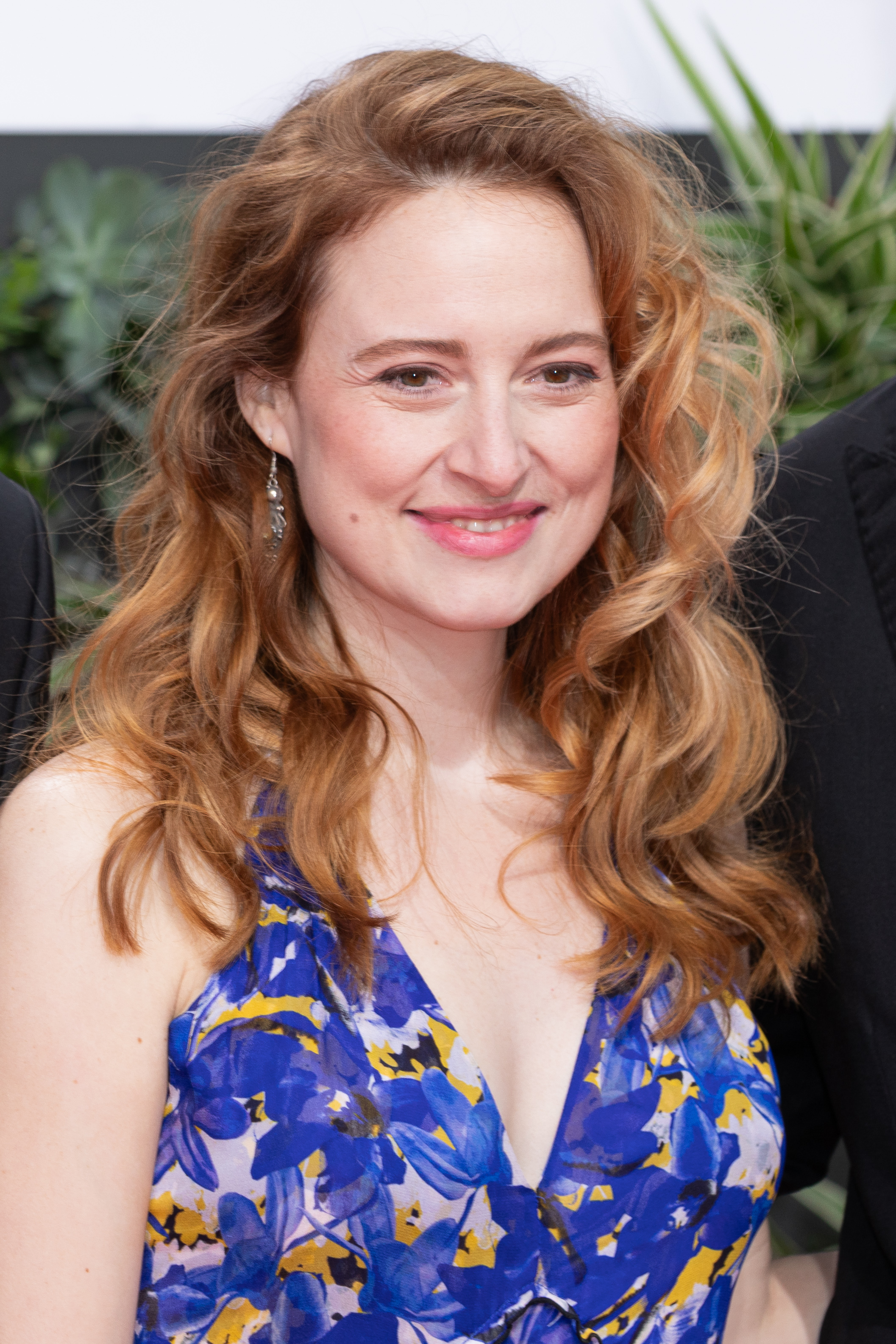
- Perdelwitz in 2019
- Born: 13 February 1984; East Berlin, East Germany
- Died: 6 October 2025 (aged 41); Hamburg, Germany
- Occupation: Actress
- Organizations: Maxim Gorki Theater
- Known for: role in Großstadtrevier
- Children: 1

Wanda-Colombina Perdelwitz (13 February 1984 – 6 October 2025) was a German actress known for her role of Nina Sieveking in the television series Großstadtrevier, played over ten years. A member of the Maxim Gorki Theater, she performed on stages in Germany in roles such as Puck in Shakespeare's A Midsummer Night's Dream in 2005. She performed in more than 40 productions in film and television, including a lead role in Muxmäuschenstill in 2004 and Cleo in 2019. She was known for her roles in various television series, and also worked on audiobooks and audioplays.

== Life and career ==
Wanda-Colombina Perdelwitz was born in East Berlin on 13 February 1984, the daughter of the actress Heidrun Perdelwitz and the actor and director Reinhard Hellmann; she was the niece of the actress Angelika Perdelwitz. She grew up with her mother. As a child, she was often present at her mother's performances at the Deutsches Theater, watching from backstage. Her mother worked at the theatre for two decades and portrayed characters such as Brecht's Mother Courage. Perdelwitz later named her mother as a great role model, along with Simone de Beauvoir and Marlene Dietrich. After German reunification, her mother systematically travelled with her to explore countries such as Turkey in 1990, Greece in 1991, Italy in 1992, Egypt in 1993, Kenya in 1994 and the United States in 1995. She had her first acting experiences in television series during her school years, including Tatort and Der Alte. She played her first small role in the international film CQ directed by Roman Coppola.

Perdelwitz trained in ballet at the State School of Ballet from 2000, Simultaneously she studied voice with Anette Goeres. She then studied acting at the Rostock University of Music and Theatre from 2003 to 2007.

During her studies, she had her first engagements at the Staatstheater Braunschweig, the Volkstheater Rostock and the Staatstheater Schwerin, where she appeared as Puck in Shakespeare's A Midsummer Night's Dream in 2005. After completing her studies, she became a member of the Maxim Gorki Theater in Berlin beginning in the 2007/08 season, where she worked with directors including Armin Petras for Hauptmann's Der Biberpelz and Tom Lanoye's Mefisto Forever, and with Jan Bosse. In the 2008/09 season she appeared as Lady Anna in Shakespeare's Richard III at Deutsches Theater Göttingen, and in Ferdinand Bruckner's Krankheit der Jugend at the Grillo-Theater in Essen, directed by Nuran David Calis. She performed the role of Kitty in Bosse's staging of Anna Karenina after Tolstoy's novel in a co-production of the Gorki Theater and the Ruhrfestspiele, alongside Fritzi Haberlandt and Milan Peschel from 2008 to 2013. In 2015 she performed as the Student in Die Studentin und Monsieur Henri directed by Jürgen Wölffer at the Komödie Winterhuder Fährhaus, also the Ernst Deutsch Theater and the Hamburger Kammerspiele.

In film, she portrayed Kira, the female lead role in the film Muxmäuschenstill, in 2004. She appeared in films such as Wahrheit oder Pflicht, in the German-Australian co-production Lore, in Johannes Fabrick's comedy Kleine Ziege, sturer Bock, and in the international Verachtung after Jussi Adler-Olsen, directed by Christoffer Boe.

She had roles in episodes of television series such as Polizeiruf 110, SOKO Köln, and SOKO Wismar. She became known for the role of Police Sergeant Nina Sieveking, alongside Jan Fedder, in the ARD series Großstadtrevier, from November 2012 (episode 327) to December 2022 (episode 482) The character has been described as "impetuous, courageous, a little girly" and "impulsive". In 2017, she received a RTV Award, naming her "Coolste Kommissarin" for the role". In 2019, after Fedder's death and her maternal leave, she returned to the series, then in a new full-length format, to play the police woman who was also a victim whose long hair was cut off during an attack.

In ZDF television films, she played in Das Kindermädchen directed by Carlo Rola and portrayed the title role in Harriets Traum by Katie Fforde. She appeared in the HR television film Bist du glücklich?, directed by Max Zähle, which earned the 2018 of the Biberacher Filmfestspiele and the 2020 Deutscher Fernsehpreis, both in the category best television film. Perdelwitz performed in more than 40 productions in film and television.

She was a voice actress for audiobooks and audioplays for broadcasters NDR, WDR, and RBB, and the publisher Jumbo Verlag. At times, she provided her voice for dubbing.

=== Personal life and death ===
Perdelwitz lived in Hamburg and had a son, born in 2019.

On 28 September 2025, she was riding her bicycle on a designated bike path near the Hamburg Dammtor station where a car had stopped where this was not permitted. An occupant then opened their door into her path without looking, dooring and severely injuring her. She was immediately taken to a hospital. Perdelwitz succumbed to her serious head injuries there on 6 October 2025, at the age of 41.

== Filmography ==
Productions with Perdelwitz include:

- 2001: CQ
- 2002: Tattoo
- 2002: Home Run (short film)
- 2003: Soloalbum
- 2003: Die Sitte (TV series, episode 1x04: "Gier")
- 2003: Tatort Rotkäppchen (TV series)
- 2003: Küstenwache (TV series, episode 6x08: "Falsche Liebe")
- 2003: Für alle Fälle Stefanie (TV series, 2 episodes)
- 2004, 2023: Der Alte (TV series, two episodes, different roles)
- 2004: Muxmäuschenstill
- 2004: Balko (TV series, episode 7x02: "Giftzwerge")
- 2005: Wahrheit oder Pflicht
- 2005: Wolffs Revier (TV series, episode 13x07: "Der letzte Ritter")
- 2006: Die Rettungsflieger (TV series, episode 11x03: "Mitten im Leben")
- 2007: SOKO Wismar (TV series, episode 4x06: "Blindes Vertrauen")
- 2007: R. I. S. – Die Sprache der Toten (TV series, episode 1x11: "Tödliche Grüße")
- 2007–2025: In aller Freundschaft (TV series, 3 episodes, different roles)
- 2009–2022: SOKO Köln (TV series, 3 episodes, different roles)
- 2010: Polizeiruf 110: "Blutiges Geld" (TV series)
- 2010: Katie Fforde: "Harriets Traum" (TV series)
- 2010: Da kommt Kalle (TV series, episode 4x03: "Chaos in der Gartenkolonie")
- 2012: Lore
- 2012: Das Kindermädchen
- 2012–2022: Großstadtrevier (TV series, 149 episodes)
- 2013: Eine Rolle mit Stil (Kurzfilm)
- 2015: Alarm für Cobra 11 – Die Autobahnpolizei (TV series, episode 21x04: "Tausend Tode")
- 2015: Kleine Ziege, sturer Bock
- 2015: Die Pfefferkörner (TV series, episode 12x04: "Vor Gericht")
- 2015: Hans im Glück
- 2016: In aller Freundschaft – Die jungen Ärzte (TV series, episode 2x10: "Schöner Schein")
- 2016: Familie Dr. Kleist (TV series, episode 6x05: "Der Schläfer")
- 2016: Rosamunde Pilcher: "Haustausch mit Hindernissen" (TV series)
- 2017: Katie Fforde: "Meine verrückte Familie"
- 2017: Bad Cop - kriminell gut (TV series, episode 1x09: "Sieben Zentimeter")
- 2018: Bist du glücklich?
- 2018: Verachtung
- 2019: Cleo
- 2020: Wilsberg: Vaterfreuden (TV series)
- 2023: Sarah Kohr: Irrlichter (TV series)
- 2023: SOKO Leipzig (TV series), episode 23x23: "Das Leben ist kein Ponyhof")
- 2023: SOKO Hamburg (TV series), episode 5x09: "Die erste Geige")
- 2024: Das Traumschiff (TV series, episode 100: "Nusantara")
- 2024: Ein Sommer im Schwarzwald (TV series)
- 2024: Morden im Norden (TV series, episode 10x10: "Die Tote an Deck")
- 2024–2025: Behringer und die Toten – Ein Bamberg-Krimi
