= Ursula Hinrichs =

German actress (born 1935)

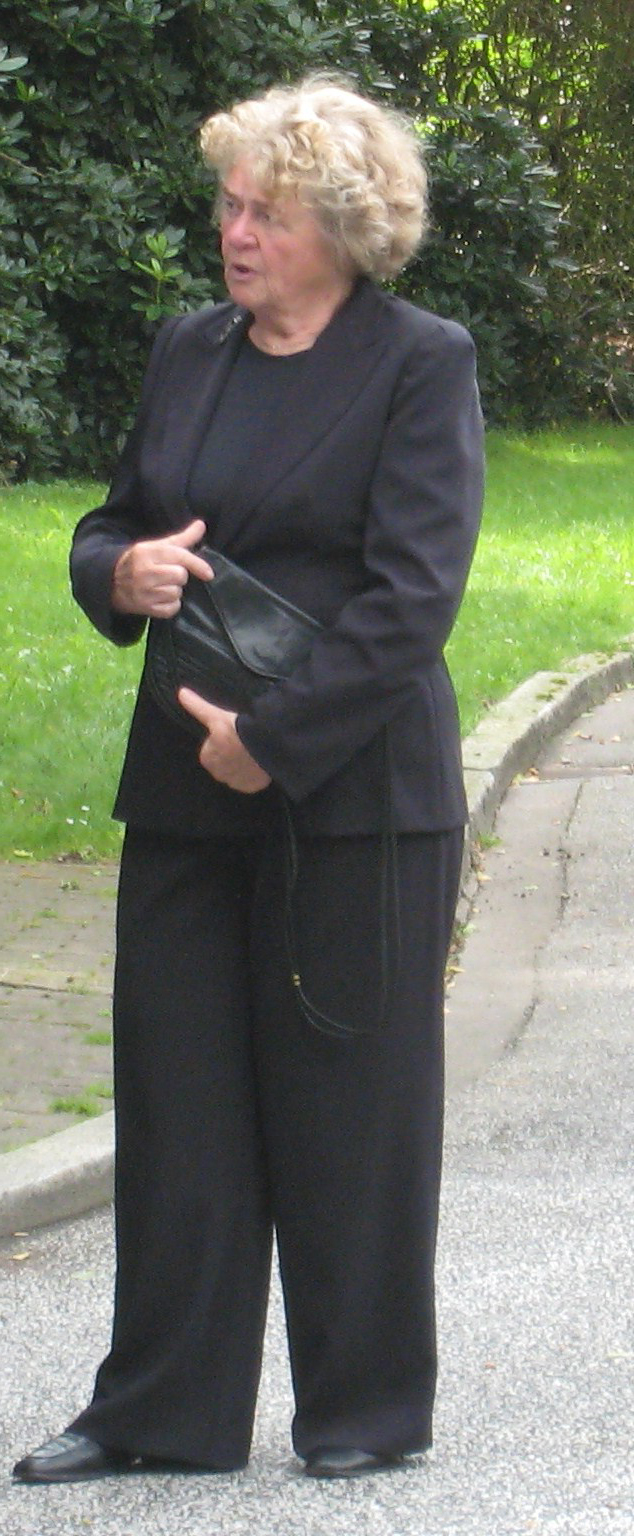
- Born: April 27, 1935 (age 90); Apen, Ammerland, Lower Saxony, Germany
- Occupation: Actor

Ursula Hinrichs (born April 27, 1935) is a German actress.

== Biography ==
Ursula was born on April 27, 1935. She is a well-known actress and her nickname is "The Hinrichs." She is also known as "the Grand Dame of Theater." In the 1990s and 2000s, Hinrichs also appeared regularly on television outside of Ohnsorg recordings. In the successful children's series Neues vom Süderhof (1991-1997) and Die Kinder vom Alstertal (1998-2004), for example, she was among the main cast in the role of the lovable grandmother. In 1993, she appeared in the miniseries Der große Bellheim as Emma, the housekeeper of Bellheim, played by Mario Adorf. In addition, she has been active since 1956 as a narrator of Low German radio plays and texts, such as since 2011 as Oma Hertha in the NDR radio series Düsse Petersens. In recent years, Hinrichs has been doing more frequent Low German readings in northern Germany.

== Neues vom Süderhof ==
From 1991 to 1997, Ursula was one of the few actors to appear in all five seasons of the children's TV show, Neues vom Süderhof.

== Die Kinder vom Alstertal ==
From 1998 to 2004, Ursula reprised a similar role to her Süderhof role, as the kind grandmother in Die Kinder vom Alstertal.

== Stage career ==
Hinrichs has worked for 40 years in plattdeutsch German theater.

== Filmography ==
- Großstadtrevier, a crime TV series
- Die Rettungsflieger
- Heiter bis tödlich: Morden im Norden
