= 205 – Room of Fear =

2011 film

- Directed by: Rainer Matsutani
- Written by: Eckhard Vollmar
- Produced by: Boris Schönfelder; Michael Kölmel; Stefan Gärtner
- Starring: Jennifer Ulrich; André Hennicke; Inez Bjørg David; Julia Dietze; Tino Mewes
- Cinematography: Jan Fehse
- Edited by: Marco Pav D'Auria
- Music by: Wolfram de Marco
- Production company: Neue Schönhauser Filmproduktion
- Distributed by: Kinowelt; Euro Video
- Release dates: 2 December 2011 (German Films Go North!); 4 April 2013 (Germany)
- Running time: 103 minutes
- Country: Germany
- Language: German
- Box office: €309,172

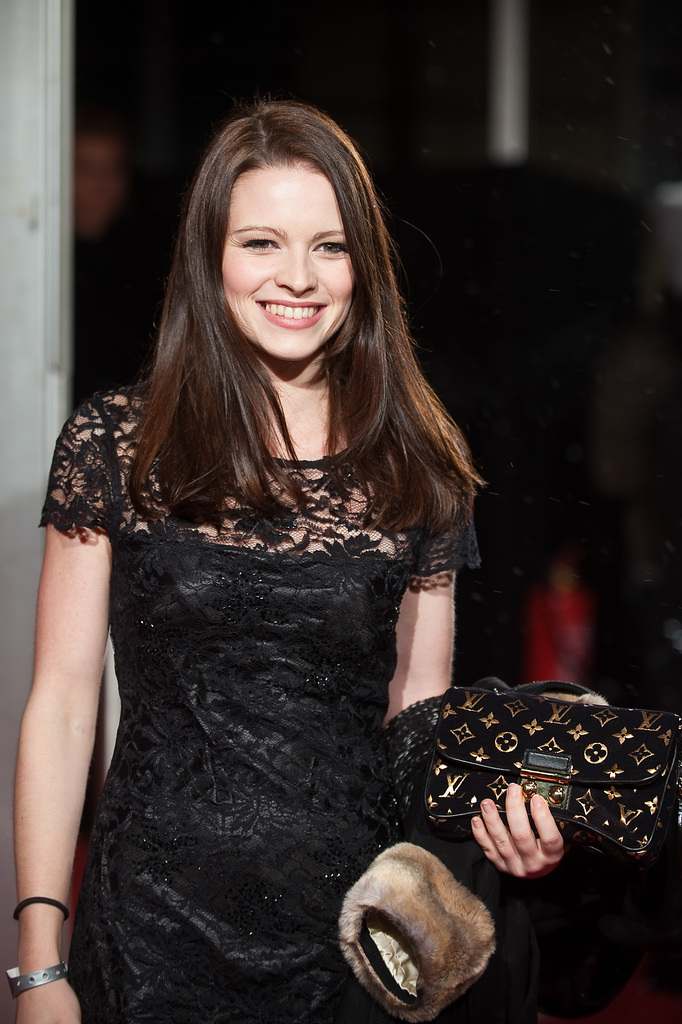
Jennifer Ulrich, who plays Katrin Nadolny

205 – Room of Fear (German: 205 – Zimmer der Angst) is a 2011 German horror film directed by Rainer Matsutani. It's a remake of the Danish film Room 205. The film stars Jennifer Ulrich. Marie-Alise Recasner recorded an original song for the ending credits as well as performed vocals on the score.

== Cast ==
- Jennifer Ulrich as Katrin Nadolny
- André Hennicke as Commissioner Urban
- Inez Bjørg David as Carmen
- Tino Mewes as Dirk
- Julia Dietze as Annika
- Florian Jahr as Niko
- Marleen Lohse as Sanne
- Hans Uwe Bauer as Katrin's Father
- Lucy Ella von Scheele as Beatrice
- Daniel Roesner as Christian
- Juliane Gregori as Urban's Assistant
- Aaron Hong Le as Tom
- Matthias Halbrock as Priest
- Dennis Gansel as Boyfriend

== Release ==
=== Box office ===
Originally planned for an opening in 2011, the movie was pushed back. After it was questioned to do a theatrical release or rather releasing it direct-to-video, the movie opened in German theaters on 4 April 2013. The film failed to open within the Top 5 of its opening week and grossed €309,172 at the end of its theatrical run. Before the official opening in Germany, 205 - Room of Fear was part of the German films Go North festival in Stockholm and was released on 20 July 2012 in Turkey.

=== Home media ===
205 – Room of Fear will be released in Region 2 on DVD and Blu-ray on 10 October 2013 in Germany. It will be released with an FSK 16 rating.

== Reception ==
The response to the film has been mixed. Based on twelve reviews collected by moviepilot, 205 – Room of Fear has an average score of 5.0 out of 10. Echo Online's Dirk Henninger praises the acting and finds the story thrilling, while Near Darks Ash Williams thinks it's finally a "good horror thriller" from Germany, giving 205 – Room of Fear four out of five stars. Spielfilm.de gave the film the score 8 out of 10, enjoying the focus on Katrin's psyche. Cinetastic gave the film 6 out of 10.

Rajko Burchardt wrote of the scary movie "with East German feel" that while it's honorable to give the German horror film a try, the film failed miserably. Lida Bach of Filmrezension gave the movie another negative review with giving it one out of five stars.
