= Die Kinder vom Alstertal =

- Directed by: Monika Zinnenberg
- Starring: Marco Soumikh; Tim Küchler; Marleen Lohse; Janina Uhse
- Country of origin: Germany
- No. of seasons: 4
- No. of episodes: 52

Production
- Running time: 25 minutes

Original release
- Release: 7 December 1998

Die Kinder vom Alstertal is a German children's television series produced by Norddeutscher Rundfunk and broadcast on the Kinderkanal from 1998 to 2004. There are 52 episodes in four seasons.

== Series ==
The series is set in a large farmhouse near the North Sea with a station on the Hamburg U-Bahn. The main characters are seven children from three families living together in the house, and the series also features assorted animals, in particular the farm dog, Oskar, the farm cats, a tame rooster, Einstein, and a pony, Justus. It was a successor to Neues vom Süderhof, with the same director, Monika Zinnenberg, and Ursula Hinrichs, the grandmother in the former series, playing an aunt. Scriptwriters were Marlies Kerremans, Jörn Schröder and Horst Peter Lommer, with Arno Alexander as editor. Die Kinder vom Alstertal aimed to be more realistic and somewhat more complex than its predecessor.

Filming took place near Soltau at the Menkenhof.

== Main cast ==
- Ami: Ursula Hinrichs
- Babsi: Sonja Farke
- Carla: Simone Ritscher
- Cosima: Alessa Grimm
- Hexe: Marleen Lohse
- Kiki: Thuy-Anh Cao
- Lisa: Katharina Wäschenbach
- Susi: Kerstin Draeger
- Timo: Marco Soumikh
- Tobias: Tim Küchler
- Uwe: Lennardt Krüger
