= Marleen Lohse =

German actress (born 1984)

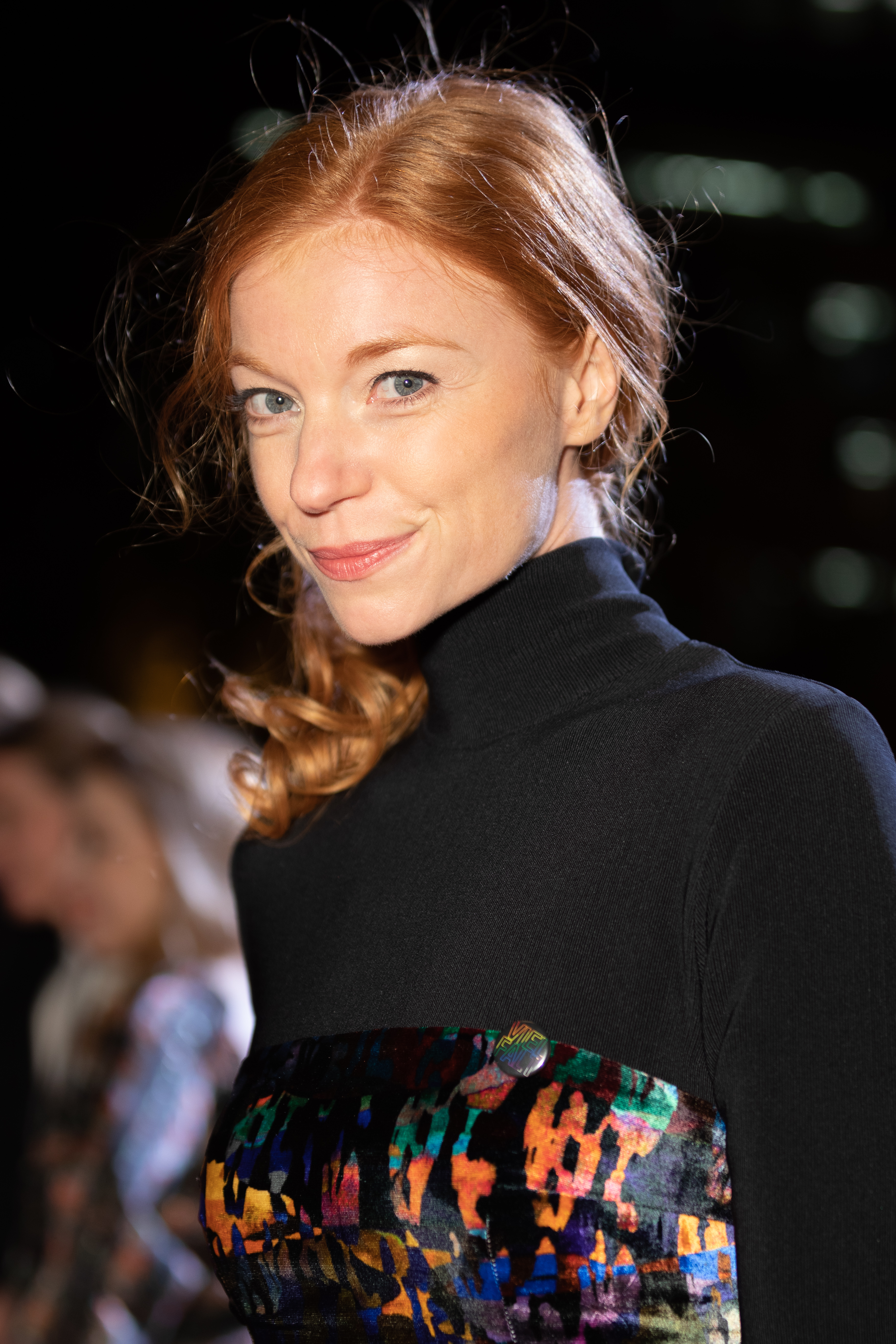
- Lohse in 2019
- Born: 28 February 1984 (age 42); Soltau, West Germany
- Occupation: actress
- Years active: 1998–present

Marleen Lohse (born February 28, 1984, in Soltau) is a German actress.

== Education ==
Lohse completed her abitur and in 2006 moved to Berlin, completing a diploma course in Acting at the Hochschule für Film und Fernsehen Konrad Wolf in Potsdam from 2006 to 2010.

== Acting career ==
Marleen Lohse began acting in television series and films at the age of 12, and played the character Julia "Hexe" Clement in the children's series Die Kinder vom Alstertal from 1998 to 2002.

After completing school, Lohse continued acting appearing in Wilde Jungs (2004) and in the television series Stolberg and Leipzig Homicide and in the Tatort episodes Roter Tod (2007) and Schatten der Angst (2008). She also appeared in the television films Mordshunger (2008), Das tapfere Schneiderlein (2008), Das blaue Licht (2010) and Tsunami – Das Leben danach and in the cinema films Vollidiot (2007), Diamantenhochzeit (2009), Wedding Fever in Campobello (2009), Résiste – Aufstand der Praktikanten (2009), 205 – Room of Fear (2011) and No Sex Is No Option (2011).

Lohse has played in some films directed by Erik Schmitt. She was co-author of the screenplay for the short film Berlin Metanoia. In his first feature-length film, Cleo, which had its premiere in 2019 at the 69th Berlin International Film Festival in the category Generation, she played the title role.

In 2013, Lohse appeared in the video Where You Stand from the band Travis, and in 2016 in the video Protected from the band Keøma.

== Filmography ==
- 1997: Neues vom Süderhof (television series, episode Stress für Carla)
- 1998–2004: Die Kinder vom Alstertal (television series, 44 episodes)
- 1999: Ich bin kein Mann für eine Frau (television film)
- 2002: Hallo Robbie! (television series, episode S.O.S. für Robbie)
- 2002–2007: Die Rettungsflieger (television series, 3 episodes)
- 2003: Küssen verboten, Baggern erlaubt
- 2004: Wilde Jungs (television series, episode Die Auktion)
- 2004: Die Albertis (television series, episode Denn sie wissen nicht, was tun)
- 2005: SOKO Wismar (television series, episode Der Zinker)
- 2006: Chinese Take Away (short film)
- 2006: Elsas Geburtstag (short film)
- 2006: KRIMI.DE (television series, episode Unter Druck)
- 2006–2009: Leipzig Homicide (television series, 6 episodes)
- 2007: Memory Effect (short film)
- 2007: Sechs tote Studenten
- 2007: Tatort – Roter Tod
- 2007: Vollidiot
- 2007, 2009: Notruf Hafenkante (television series, 2 episodes)
- 2008: Mordshunger
- 2008: Tatort – Schatten der Angst
- 2008: Die Pfefferkörner (television series, episode Abgezockt)
- 2008: Die Gerichtsmedizinerin (television series, episode Schlaf Kindlein, schlaf)
- 2008: Das tapfere Schneiderlein
- 2008, 2014: Küstenwache (television series, 2 episodes)
- 2009: Résiste – Aufstand der Praktikanten
- 2009: Diamantenhochzeit
- 2009: Wedding Fever in Campobello
- 2010: Stolberg (television series, episode Eine Frage der Ehre)
- 2010, 2012: Stuttgart Homicide (television series, 2 episodes)
- 2010: Inga Lindström – Prinzessin des Herzens
- 2010: Das blaue Licht
- 2010: Deadline – Jede Sekunde zählt (television series, episode Schlafende Hunde)
- 2011: Countdown – Die Jagd beginnt (television series, episode Singles)
- 2011: No Sex Is No Option
- 2011: Cologne P.D. (television series, episode Früchte des Zorns)
- 2011: 205 – Room of Fear
- 2012: Die Tote ohne Alibi
- 2012: Der Cop und der Snob (television series, episode Der Morgen danach)
- 2012: Tsunami – Das Leben danach
- 2012: Sushi in Suhl
- 2013: Nashorn im Galopp (short film)
- 2013: Der Staatsanwalt (television series, episode Mitten ins Herz)
- 2013: Frau Ella
- 2013: Frauen, die Geschichte machten (documentary series, episode Elisabeth I. – Verheiratet mit England)
- 2013: Großstadtrevier (television series, episode Das Phantom)
- 2013: The Fifth Estate
- 2013: Mordshunger − Verbrechen und andere Delikatessen (television mini-series, 2 episodes)
- 2014: TVLab (television series, episode Alibi Agentur)
- 2014: Die Familiendetektivin (television series, episode Mütter)
- 2014: Letzte Spur Berlin (television series, episode Durchleuchtet)
- 2014: The Old Fox (television series, episode Ein langsamer Tod)
- 2014–present: Nord bei Nordwest (television series)
  - 2014: Käpt’n Hook
  - 2015: Der wilde Sven
  - 2017: Estonia
  - 2017: Der Transport
  - 2018: Sandy
  - 2018: Waidmannsheil
  - 2019: Gold!
  - 2019: Frau Irmler
  - 2020: Dinge des Lebens
- 2015–2017: Im Knast (television series)
- 2015: Too Young to Die
- 2016: Berlin Metanoia (short film)
- 2016: Santa Maria (short film)
- 2016: Your Children
- 2016: Nachtschicht – Ladies First (television series)
- 2016: Der mit dem Schlag
- 2017: Happy Burnout
- 2017: Blaumacher (television series, episode Der Mann im Haus)
- 2018: MANN/FRAU (mini-series)
- 2019: Ein starkes Team (television series, episode Eiskalt)
- 2019: Cleo
- 2019: Bella Germania (television miniseries, 3 episodes)
- 2019: Flucht durchs Höllental
- 2019: La Palma [de]

== Music ==
Lohse is a songwriter for the musical duo Unsereins, in which she plays guitar and sings with Julius Hartog. Unsereins was chosen to perform at the 2015 Shortkicks Gala short-film competition.

== Personal life ==
Marleen Lohse's parents run a hairdresser salon in St. Georg, Hamburg.
