= Heinz Lieven =

German actor (1928–2021)

- Born: 18 April 1928; Blankenese, Germany
- Died: 27 September 2021 (aged 93); Hamburg, Germany
- Occupation: Actor
- Years active: 1950s—2021
- Spouse: Hertha Lieven

Heinz Lieven (18 April 1928 – 27 September 2021) was a German actor.

== Life and work ==
Lieven was born in Blankenese, Hamburg, where he was raised. In 1948, he began an actor's training with the actors Helmuth Gmelin and Bernhard Minetti. He married a makeup artist in 1966 and has two sons with her.

Heinz Lieven started his stage career as actor at the Theater im Zimmer in Hamburg. After this engagement he went with diverse travelling theatres through Germany. In the 1960s he played as actor in several television productions.

In 1971 the German director Boleslaw Barlog brought Heinz Lieven to the Schillertheater in Berlin, where he played till 1978. Later the actor played at Berlin's Volksbühne. In 1978 he moved to Bremen, where he worked as theatre director. Three years later, Heinz Lieven lived again in his hometown Hamburg and later in 1995 in his district Blankenese. During this time, he played at several theatres like the Hamburger Kammerspiele and Altonaer Theater in Hamburg or Theater Lübeck.

Among his theater engagements Heinz Lieven frequently appeared in TV-films, -series and a few movies. Furthermore, he presented readings with texts of German Writers and poets and travelled as entertainer and acting coach on cruise liners like the MS Deutschland.

He made his international film debut in Aleksandar Petrovic's Group Portrait with a Lady and played a former SS Officer named Aloise Lange in the 2011 movie This Must Be the Place.

Heinz Lieven lived in Hamburg.

== Personal life ==
Lieven had been married to the make-up artist Hertha Lieven, née Gobrecht, since 1966. He had two sons, Alexander Lieven (1959), former deputy president of the Casino Society in Berlin from 1986, and Claudius Lieven (1968), former member of the Hamburg's parliament.

== Selected filmography ==
- 1963: Stalingrad (TV film)
- 1966: Herr Puntila und sein Knecht Matti (TV film)
- 1969: Das Rätsel von Piskov (TV film)
- 1971: Hamburg Transit: Ein Zahn zuviel (TV series)
- 1972: Gefährliche Streiche (TV series)
- 1973: Bauern, Bonzen und Bomben (TV miniseries)
- 1974: Ermittlungen gegen Unbekannt (TV film)
- 1976: Ein Fall für Stein: Kindermord im Nebenhaus (TV series)
- 1976: Time of Maturity (Reifezeit) (TV film)
- 1976: Bei Westwind hört man keinen Schuß (TV film)
- 1977: Ein Mann kam im August (TV series, 6 episodes)
- 1977: Group Portrait with a Lady
- 1978: Das kalte Herz (TV series)
- 1979: Die Buddenbrooks (TV miniseries)
- 1979: Ein Kapitel für sich (TV miniseries)
- 1980: Order
- 1980: Tatort: Streifschuß (TV series)
- 1982: Die Aufgabe des Dr. med. Graefe (TV film)
- 1982: Tatort: Trimmel und Isolde (TV series)
- 1986: Engels & Consorten (TV series)
- 1986: Finkenwerder Geschichten (TV series)
- 1986: Großstadtrevier: Mensch, der Bulle ist 'ne Frau (TV series)
- 1987: Das Rätsel der Sandbank (TV miniseries)
- 1989: Der Landarzt (TV series)
- 1990: Wer zu spät kommt – Das Politbüro erlebt die deutsche Revolution (TV film)
- 2000: Großstadtrevier: Sunny Boy (TV series)
- 1993: Schwarz Rot Gold: Mafia polska (TV series)
- 1995: Eine Frau wird gejagt (TV film)
- 1996: Freunde fürs Leben (TV series)
- 1997: Neues vom Süderhof (TV series, appearance in 13 episodes from 1996 to 1997)
- 1998: Dr. Monika Lindt – Kinderärztin, Geliebte, Mutter (TV series)
- 1999: Death Hunters: To Die For (TV film)
- 1999: Wut im Bauch (TV film)
- 2000: Doppelter Einsatz: Lebendig begraben (TV series)
- 2000: Großstadtrevier: Die Stunde der Frauen (TV series)
- 2001: Tatort: Hasard (TV series)
- 2002: Küstenwache: Verbrecherisches Trio (TV series)
- 2005: Adelheid und ihre Mörder (TV series, appearance in 7 episodes from 1996 to 2005)
- 2007: Notruf Hafenkante: Grauzonen (TV series)
- 2007: Ladyland (Comedy TV series)
- 2007: Notruf Hafenkante: Fahrerflucht (TV series)
- 2008: Final Proclamation (TV film)
- 2008: Notruf Hafenkante: Auf schmalem Grat (TV series)
- 2009: Lasko – Die Faust Gottes: Der Weg nach Rom (TV series)
- 2009: Within the Whirlwind
- 2010: 2 für alle Fälle – Ein Song für den Mörder (TV film)
- 2011: This Must Be the Place
- 2012: Küstenwache: Der eiserne Seehund (TV series)
- 2013: Tatort: Er wird töten (TV series)
- 2015: Remember
