= Blobel =

Blobel is a German surname. Notable people with the surname include:

- Brigitte Blobel (born 1942), German writer
- Paul Blobel (1894–1951), German Nazi war criminal, hanged for war crimes
- Günter Blobel (1936–2018), German American biologist and 1999 Nobel Prize laureate in Physiology
