= Pamela Großer =

German actress and television presenter

- Born: June 11, 1977 (age 49); Hamburg, Germany
- Occupations: Actress; TV host
- Years active: 1996–2007

Pamela Großer (born June 11, 1977) is a German actress, singer and TV host.

== Personal life ==
Großer is married and has three children.

== Career ==
=== Neues vom Süderhof ===
When she was a teenager, Pamela landed the role of Manuela "Molle" Brendel in the TV show Neues vom Süderhof. This role lasted from 1991 to 1993. Although she played Molle in the first 2 seasons, Neues vom Süderhof changed almost the entire cast of actors for season 3, 4 and 5. Cora Sabrina Grimm took over the role of Molle.

=== Tigerenten Club ===
Großer continued to work for the ARD for 10 years. From 1998 to 2007, Pamela was a TV presenter on the children's game and entertainment show, the Tigerenten Club.

=== Kaffee oder Tee ===
In 2010, Großer worked as a host for the SWR TV show Kaffee oder Tee.

=== Singing ===
Großer also briefly pursued a singing career. In 1997 her single Erste Liebe ("First love") was released under the artist name "elá". In 2002, together with a children's choir, she released an album entitled Die Welt steht Kopf ("The World Is Upside Down").

== Filmography ==
List of films Pamela has worked in:

- Warnung aus dem Käfig
- Großstadtrevier (NDR)
- 1991–1983: Neues vom Süderhof (ARD)
- Kartoffeln mit Stippe (ZDF)
- Immenhof (ZDF)
- Polizeiruf 110 (ARD)
- WissQuiz (WDR)
- 1996: Unter einem Dach
