= Neues aus Büttenwarder =

German television series

- Also known as: Büttenwarder op Platt
- Genre: Comedy
- Created by: Norbert Eberlein
- Country of origin: Germany
- Original language: German
- No. of seasons: 15
- No. of episodes: 94

Production
- Running time: 25 minutes
- Production company: Norddeutscher Rundfunk

Original release
- Network: N3 (1997–2001); NDR Fernsehen (2001–2021)
- Release: 26 December 1997 – 1 January 2021

Neues aus Büttenwarder is a German TV Series which aired from 1997 to 2021 and was created by Norbert Eberlein. The comedy series with Jan Fedder and Peter Heinrich Brix portrays events in the fictional village of Büttenwarder in Schleswig-Holstein. Fedder died of cancer in 2019. After his death, three more episodes were filmed, after which the series was discontinued in 2021.

== Plot ==
The two main characters are played by Jan Fedder (Kurt Brakelmann; until 2019) and Peter Heinrich Brix (Arthur „Adsche“ Tönnsen). Both were previously well known from the TV series Großstadtrevier. Further characters are played by Günter Kütemeyer (as Mayor Dr. Waldemar Schönbiehl; until 2015), Axel Olsson (as pub landlord Shorty) and Sven Walser (as stable boy Kuno).

The series is filmed in the Stormarn district of Schleswig-Holstein and in the local area. The pub which features heavily in the series – Unter den Linden (also known as Dorfkrug) – is in Grönwohld. When the pub is not being used for filming it is open to the public and also serves ‘’Lütt un Lütt’’ (direct translation ‘’Small and Small’’ – a beer and a schnapps) which is a much loved (and often mentioned) drink in the series.

The 25 minute long episodes are usually concerned with the friendship between Brakelmann and Adsche who often try to outdo each other usually in the pursuit of quick money making opportunities. However, the friends always support each other in difficult situations.

== Cast ==
Actor	Characters Name	Episodes	Comments
Jan Fedder	Kurt Brakelmann	1–47, 50–67, 71–73, 75–78, 83–84, 86–87, 92	Farmer, Adsche‘s friend (and sometimes enemy). Died in episode 92.
Peter Heinrich Brix	Arthur „Adsche“ Tönnsen	1–94	Farmer, Brakelmann’s friend (and sometimes enemy)
Günter Kütemeyer	Dr. Waldemar Schönbiehl	1–65	Notary and Mayor
Axel Olsson	„Shorty"	1–94	Pub landlord at Unter den Linden
Sven Walser	Kuno Eggers	1–94	Stable Boy
Hans Kahlert	Onkel Krischan	12–94	Adsche’s unkle (105 years old)
Uwe Rohde	Peter	9–91	Local policeman
Jens Peter Brose	„Charly“	15–35	Postman
Veit Stübner	Dr. Rufus Kloppstedt	21, 22	Doctor
Stephan Bieker	Martin Meyer-Schönbiehl	45–53	Schönbiehl’s nephew
Hendrik von Bültzingslöwen	Heinzi	25, 30, 40, 56, 57, 60, 63–67, 69, 71, 74–77, 79, 81, 83–84, 88–90, 93	Farmer
Axel Milberg	Hajo Narkmeyer	80–82, 88, 90, 93	Farmer
Suzanne von Borsody	Ylvie Tönnsen	94, 96–98	Adsche's sister
Anica Dobra	Gerlinde Kötenbröck	87	Brakelmann's and Adsche's unforgotten teenage crush

== Episodes ==
The episodes are recorded in German and are dubbed in Plattdüütsch in the studio by the same actors at a later date. The episodes are usually first aired in German and then in Plattdüütsch at a later date.

List of Episodes (Series 1)
Episode	Title	First airing (High German)	First airing (op platt)
01	Der Bär steppt	16.01.2001	31.05.2004
02	Fette Beute	13.02.2001	09.06.2003
03	Bildungsschock	30.01.2001	09.06.2003
04	Liebesnacht	26.12.1999	09.06.2003
05	Ferienfieber	20.02.2001	30.05.2004
06	Heiratsmarkt	22.05.2001	30.05.2004
07	Wahlkampf	29.05.2001	03.01.2004
08	Ufos	26.12.1997	31.05.2004

List of Episodes (Series 2)
Episode	Title	First airing (High German)	First airing (op platt)
09	Reisefieber	25.12.2004	27.12.2006
10	Schuld und Sühne	25.12.2004	27.12.2006
11	Glücksspielhölle	03.10.2005	15.02.2007
12	Goethejahr	03.10.2005	15.02.2007
13	Staatsbesuch	03.10.2006	09.04.2007
14	Geldregen	26.09.2006	09.04.2007

List of Episodes (Series 3)
Episode	Title	First airing (High German)	First airing (op platt)
15	Schmerzensgeld	24.12.2007	16.12.2008
16	Verschollen	26.12.2007	16.12.2008
17	Karneval	27.12.2007	16.12.2008
18	Pflegeparadies	25.12.2007	21.12.2008
19	Weihnachten	23.12.2008	25.12.2008
20	Silvester	31.12.2008	31.12.2008

List of Episodes (Series 4)
Episode	Title	First airing (High German)	First airing (op platt)
21	Chefvisite	24.12.2008	13.12.2008
22	Vatertag	25.12.2008	15.12.2008
23	Wunder	26.12.2008	23.12.2008
24	Schönes Wohnen	29.12.2008	12.12.2008
25	Dorfschule	22.12.2009	09.12.2009
26	Endlich Urlaub	25.12.2009	10.12.2009

List of Episodes (Series 5)
Episode	Title	First airing (High German)	First airing (op platt)
27	Mambo	27.12.2009	10.12.2009
28	Goldene Erinnerungen	26.12.2009	14.12.2009
29	Damenbesuch	28.12.2009	25.12.2009
30	Der Ball rollt	05.04.2010	18.12.2010
31	Schatzsuche	02.04.2010	15.12.2010
32	War wohl Mord	25.12.2010	06.12.2010

List of Episodes (Series 6)
Episode	Title	First airing (High German)	First airing (op platt)
33	Die mit dem Wolf tanzen	30.12.2010	08.12.2010
34	Guten Appetit	26.12.2010	09.12.2010
35	Ostern	28.12.2010	22.12.2010
36	Nackt	22.12.2011	17.12.2011
37	Vizekönig	28.12.2011	19.12.2011
38	Erlentrillich	25.12.2011	22.12.2011
39	Auf großer Fahrt	26.12.2011	20.12.2011

List of Episodes (Series 7)
Episode	Title	First airing (High German)	First airing (op platt)
40	Hosenmatz	30.12.2011	27.06.2013
41	Lütt un Lütt	31.12.2011	04.07.2013
42	Stadtschinken	09.04.2012	11.07.2013
43	Scheinheiliger	06.04.2012	18.07.2013
44	Survival	25.12.2012	26.12.2012
45	Kömkuchen	25.12.2012	25.07.2013
46	Schafwölkchen	20.12.2012	01.08.2013
47	Freiheit	01.01.2013	

List of Episodes (Series 8)
Episode	Title	First airing (High German)	First airing (op platt)
48	Entführt	02.01.2014	
49	Rendezvous	03.01.2014	
50	Fifty	25.12.2013	
51	Donnerschlach	19.12.2013	
52	Patchwork	09.06.2014	
53	Sinn	08.06.2014	
54	Apparillo	25.12.2013	
55	Stau	09.07.2014	

== Documentaries and Specials ==
Documentaries
Documentary	Title	First Airing
01	Das Beste aus Büttenwarder	??.12.2005
02	Büttenwarder privat	??.12.2007
03	Das ist Büttenwarder – Eine Serie hat Geburtstag	27.12.2007
04	Zu Besuch in Büttenwarder	25.12.2008
05	Büttenwarder ganz privat	23.12.2009
06	Das ABC von Büttenwarder	31.08.2010
07	Dein Talent in Büttenwarder	25.12.2010
08	DAS! spezial in Büttenwarder	14.07.2011
09	Altes aus Büttenwarder	28.12.2011
10	Das ZYX von Büttenwarder	20.12.2012
11	Büttenwarder: 15 Jahre – 15 Fragen	25.12.2012
12	Büttenwarder – Deine Fans	25.12.2013

Specials
Specials	Title	First Airing
01	Das war 2010	28.12.2010
02	Krisenjahr 2011	30.12.2011

== TV and DVD ==
The first episode UFOs über Büttenwarder was aired on 26 December 1997 on NDR. Two further episodes were shown on 26 December 1999 (Liebesnacht in Büttenwarder and Wahlkampf in Büttenwarder). In 2001 these episodes were integration in the first full series of Neues aus Büttenwarder.

The first 8 episodes were shown weekly on Tuesday evening from 16 January 2001 on ARD. Further episodes were aired at irregular interval from 2004. The series was initially not deemed popular enough to be aired as a regular series in the primetime TV viewing slots (9:05pm) on ARD. However, repeats on NDR proved very popular.

As of January 2014, 55 episode of Neues aus Büttenwarder have been filmed. The latest episodes were aired over Christmas 2013.

The first 47 episodes are available on DVD. Both the German and Plattdüütsch versions are available on all DVDs as well as special and bonus features.

All episodes made since 2011 are also available with Audio description.

== Talent Search ==
At the beginning of 2010 NDR ran a casting call in which fans of the show could upload videos of their unique talents onto YouTube. Over 330 videos were uploaded and the 20 best were voted on by a jury. After voting was completed the final 5 candidates were invited to a final casting after which the winner was given a guest role in the series. The runner up for also given a guest role in the series although this was only announced when the winner was revealed.

== 15 Years of Neues aus Büttenwarder ==
As part of the celebrations for the 15th anniversary of Neues aus Büttenwarder, a special cinema only compilation was shown in four north German towns. The episodes Schmerzensgeld, Guten Appetit and Schafwölkchen as well as parts of the documentary 15 Jahre – 15 Fragen (15 years – 15 questions) were shown.

== Books ==
- Norbert Eberlein, Ulfert Becker: Zu Besuch in Büttenwarder: Leute, Landschaft, Lütt & Lütt. edel-Verlag 2009, ISBN 978-3-941378-31-5.
- Norbert Eberlein: Gedeck, doppelt! – Neues aus Büttenwarder. Rowohlt, Reinbek 2012, ISBN 978-3-499-62820-7.
- Ulfert Becker: Wiedersehen in Büttenwarder: Mehr Leute, mehr Landschaft, noch mehr Lütt & Lütt. Edel-Verlag 2013, ISBN 978-3-8419-0237-5.

== See also ==
- List of German television series
