= Küchler =

Küchler, Kuechler, Kuchler are varying transliterations of a German surname. Notable people with the surname include:

- Albert Küchler (1803–1886), Danish painter associated with the Danish Golden Age
- Alwin H. Küchler (born 1965), German cinematographer
- Ernst Küchler (born 1944), German politician (SPD)
- Ferdinand Küchler (1867–1937), German violinist and composer
- Friedrich Küchler (1822–1898), German civil servant and Hessian politician
- Georg Karl Friedrich Wilhelm von Küchler (1881–1968), German field marshal
- Jacob Kuechler (1823–1893), surveyor, conscientious objector during the Civil War
- Steven Küchler (born 1975), German boxer
- Tim Küchler (born 1986), German actor

== Kuchler ==
- A. W. Kuchler, an American geographer and naturalist
