= Margit Auer =

German author

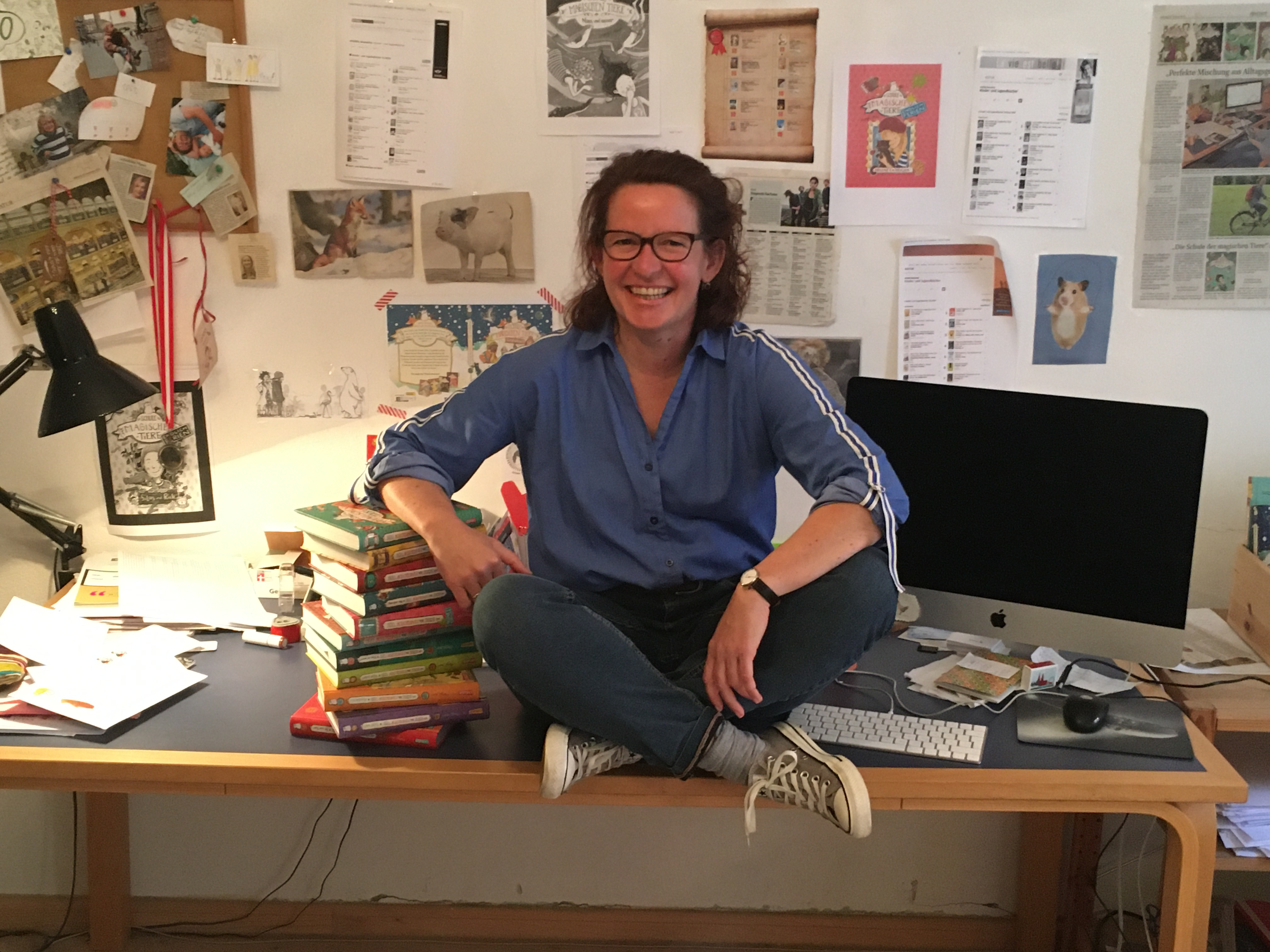
- Auer sitting at her writing desk
- Born: 23 February 1967 (age 59)
- Education: Ruperti-Gymnasium; University in Eichstätt
- Occupation: Author
- Website: Personal website

Margit Auer (born 23 February 1967) is a German author. Her children's novels have sold a total of 8 million copies and have been translated into 26 languages. Margit Auer gained popularity through her book series Die Schule der magischen Tiere (The School of Magical Animals). The first book of this continuing series was published in 2013.

== Biography ==
Auer grew up in Waldkraiburg, a town close to Munich in Bavaria, together with two older brothers. After attending the Ruperti-Gymnasium grammar school in Mühldorf, she went to university in Eichstätt, where she graduated with a degree in journalism in 1992. Auer then worked as an editor and reporter for various daily newspapers in Germany. In 1997, she opened her own editorial office. She has written for Süddeutsche Zeitung and Deutsche Presse-Agentur, among others.

After her children were born, Auer began to write children's books. Her first book, Verschwörung am Limes (Conspiracy on the Limes), a historical children's mystery, was published in 2010. It was followed by two sequels. In 2013, she published the first two books in her Die Schule der magischen Tiere series – Die Schule der magischen Tiere and Die Schule der magischen Tiere: Voller Löcher! – the first of which quickly made it onto the Spiegel magazine's bestseller list for children's books. The sequels also climbed to the top of the bestseller lists. In total, the series has sold over 7 million copies.

In March 2019, Auer was awarded the Heidelberger Leander 2019 children's book prize. From 2019 to 2023 she has been a weekly columnist for the Süddeutsche Zeitung's "Familientrio" where she answered questions on parenting. Margit Auer is married to the journalist and author of crime fiction Richard Auer. The couple lives in Bavaria and has three sons.

== Die Schule der magischen Tiere book series ==
13 books have been published in the regular series of Die Schule der magischen Tiere as well as eight spin-offs, the holiday series Die Schule der magischen Tiere – Endlich Ferien, and one special edition. In 2020, Auer published several books for early readers featuring the polar bear Murphy as a detective. All three series are ongoing. Her books have been translated into more than 20 languages and have been published in the following countries: Albania, China, the Czech Republic, Denmark, Finland, The Netherlands, Greece, Hungary, Italy, Japan, South Korea, Latvia, Lithuania, Poland, Portugal, Romania, Russia, Slovakia, Slovenia, Spain, Sweden, Taiwan, Turkey, and Ukraine.

== Plot ==
The series takes place at Winterstein School in an unnamed town in Germany. What makes Winterstein School special is the presence of magic animals who can speak and become a child's best friend. The animals (including a fox, a turtle, a penguin, and a red river hog) are given to the children by Mister Mortimer Morrison, the owner of a magical pet shop. He comes from Scotland, as does his sister, Mary Cornfield. Very few people know the secret of the magic animals: Mister Morrison, the teacher Miss Cornfield, and her class of twelve girls and twelve boys. Everyone else sees the animals as cuddly toys or they only see the animals’ shadows. In every book of the regular series, one to three children receive an animal. Each animal becomes the companion of one of the children, helping him or her handle various problems or challenges. The spin-off series focusses on holiday adventures. All the books are set during the same week of the holidays, but each one is told from a different perspective.

== The animals' special abilities ==
The magical animals become a child's best friend. They can understand human language and speak with one another. The child can speak with the magical animal as well – as long as the animal belongs to him or her. Magical animals can transform themselves. Whenever people are around who are not part of the magic circle, the animals turn into cuddly toys. Before an animal is given to a child, that child receives a message. Every time a child receives an animal, the class solemnly swears never to tell anyone their secret. The oath goes like this:
“Never ever will we speak
of the magical animals that we keep.
Top secret is the magic pet store,
and so it shall be for evermore.”

== Background and motivation ==
The author got the idea for the series when her three sons were in primary school. Although never mentioned directly, many of their school experiences have become part of the stories. "None of the characters are based on real people. But, of course, I get a lot of ideas from the people around me: What makes children laugh? What grabs their attention? What worries them? The great affection children have for animals plays an important role in my books." For Auer, animals are the ideal protagonists for conveying important messages. She hopes to strengthen the self-confidence of her readers and to help them find their role in life. A happy ending is very important to the author: "I want to write books that make children laugh, books that help them out in life, and books that make them happy. I believe children have the right to stories that end well. Of course there are challenges, dramatic turns of events, ups and downs. The heroes in my stories go through developments, they grow as people, and have to deal with the occasional hard time, just as in real life. But in the end, and that's the deal I have with my readers, the story has a happy ending."

== Film adaption ==
The film rights to the book series Die Schule der magischen Tiere were sold to the Berlin film production company Kordes & Kordes in 2014 after the producer Meike Kordes discovered the first book while on a train in the summer of 2013. A father was reading the book aloud to his daughter, and Meike Kordes secretly took a picture of the cover. One year later, the two producers Alexandra and Meike Kordes met with the publishers and the author in a café in Munich to negotiate the film rights. Filming began in September 2019 at Schloss Grafenegg in Austria and continued in Munich (at the town hall and Bavaria Studios) in October 2019 and in Cologne (MMC Studios) in November 2019. The script was written by Viola M. J. Schmidt. Gregor Schnitzler was the director. The leading adult roles were given to Nadja Uhl (Mary Cornfield), Milan Peschel (Mortimer Morrison), Justus von Dohnányi (Heribert Siegmann), Heiko Pinkowski (Willi Wondraschek), and Marleen Lohse (Elvira Kronenberg). The leading children's roles were played by Emilia Maier (Ida Kronenberg), Leonard Conrads (Benni Schubert), and Loris Sichrovsky (Jo Wieland). Over 3,500 girls and boys had applied to audition for roles. The voices of the animals were performed by Katharina Thalbach (Henrietta the turtle), Max von der Groeben (Rabbat the fox), and Sophie Rois (Pinkie the magpie). The film is scheduled to be released on 14 October 2021.

== Stage adaption ==
In 2017, Die Schule der magischen Tiere premiered in Hungarian at the Kolibri Theatre in Budapest.

== Publications ==
- Verschwörung am Limes. Emons, Köln 2010, ISBN 978-3-89705-689-3
- Die vergessenen Spiele: Augsburg in der Römerzeit. Emons, Köln 2011, ISBN 978-3-89705-819-4
- Der römische Geheimbund: ein Krimi aus dem Alten Rom. Emons, Köln 2012, ISBN 978-3-89705-959-7
- Trubel auf Burg Drachenstein: Vorlesegeschichten. Ravensburger Buchverlag, Ravensburg 2014, ISBN 978-3-473-36870-9
- Die Butterbrotbande und weitere Abenteuergeschichten. Carlsen, Hamburg 2014, ISBN 978-3-551-22123-0
- Prinzessin Himmelblau,, Stuttgart 2016, ISBN 978-3-480-23311-3
- Die schönsten Vorlesegeschichten für kleine Helden, Carlsen, Hamburg 2019, ISBN 978-3-551-51095-2
- Lenni im Weihnachtsglück, Carlsen, Hamburg 2020, ISBN 978-3-551-51840-8
- Verflixt verhext
  - Besuch um Mitternacht. cbj, München 2014, ISBN 978-3-570-15860-9
  - Ausflug ins Hexendorf. cbj, München 2014, ISBN 978-3-570-15923-1
  - Party im Mondschein. cbj, München 2015, ISBN 978-3-570-15988-0
- Die Schule der magischen Tiere
  - 1. Die Schule der magischen Tiere. Carlsen, Hamburg 2013, ISBN 978-3-551-65271-3
  - 2. Voller Löcher! Carlsen, Hamburg 2013, ISBN 978-3-551-65272-0
  - 3. Licht aus! Carlsen, Hamburg 2013, ISBN 978-3-551-65273-7
  - 4. Abgefahren! Carlsen, Hamburg 2014, ISBN 978-3-551-65274-4
  - 5. Top oder Flop! Carlsen, Hamburg 2014, ISBN 978-3-551-65275-1
  - 6. Nass und nasser! Carlsen, Hamburg 2015, ISBN 978-3-551-65276-8
  - 7. Wo ist Mr. M? Carlsen, Hamburg 2015, ISBN 978-3-551-65277-5
  - 8: Voll verknallt! Carlsen, Hamburg 2016, ISBN 978-3-551-65278-2
  - 9: Versteinert! Carlsen, Hamburg 2017, ISBN 978-3-551-65279-9
  - 10: Hin und weg! Carlsen, Hamburg 2018, ISBN 978-3-551-65280-5
  - 11: Wilder, wilder Wald! Carlsen, Hamburg 2020, ISBN 978-3-551-65361-1
  - 12: Voll das Chaos! Carlsen, Hamburg 2021, ISBN 978-3-551-65362-8
  - 13: Bravo, bravissimo! Carlsen, Hamburg 2022, ISBN 978-3-551-65363-5
- Die Schule der magischen Tiere – Endlich Ferien
  - 1. Rabbat und Ida. Carlsen, Hamburg 2016, ISBN 978-3-551-65331-4
  - 2. Silas und Rick. Carlsen, Hamburg 2017, ISBN 978-3-551-65332-1
  - 3. Henry und Leander. Carlsen, Hamburg 2018 ISBN 978-3-551-65333-8
  - 4: Helene und Karajan, Carlsen Hamburg 2019, ISBN 978-3-551-65334-5
  - 5: Benni und Henrietta, Carlsen Hamburg 2020, ISBN 978-3-551-65335-2.
  - 6: Hatice und Mette-Maja, Carlsen Hamburg 2021, ISBN 978-3-551-65336-9
  - 7: Max und Muriel, Carlsen Hamburg 2022, ISBN 978-3-551-65337-6
  - 8: Franka und Cooper, Carlsen Hamburg 2023, ISBN 978-3-551-65338-3
- Die Schule der magischen Tiere – Sonderband
  - 1. Eingeschneit! Ein Winterabenteuer. Carlsen, Hamburg 2019, ISBN 978-3-551-65046-7
- Die Schule der magischen Tiere ermittelt
  - 1. Der grüne Glibberbrief. Carlsen, Hamburg 2020, ISBN 978-3-551-65591-2
  - 2. Der Hausschuh-Dieb. Carlsen, Hamburg 2020, ISBN 978-3-551-65592-9
  - 3. Der Kokosnuss-Klau. Carlsen, Hamburg 2021, ISBN 978-3-551-65593-6
  - 4. Der Flötenschreck. Carlsen, Hamburg 2022, ISBN 978-3-551-65594-3
  - 5. Der Gurkenschurke. Carlsen, Hamburg 2023, ISBN 978-3-551-65595-0
