= Leonardo Nigro =

Swiss actor (born 1974)

- Born: 15 February 1974 (age 52); Avetrana, Italy
- Occupation: Actor
- Years active: 1996–present

Leonardo Nigro (born 15 February 1974) is a Swiss actor.

== Early life ==
Leonardo Nigro grew up in Zürich, Switzerland. His parents are Italian migrants.

== Career ==
From 1994 to 1996 he attended acting school at the European Film Actor School in Zürich and then played several roles on stages in Basel, Berlin, Hamburg und Dresden. His first TV main role was for the German TV show Einsatz Hamburg Süd, followed by many roles in shows such as Tatort, Die Wache or Ein Fall für zwei. He also starred as leading actor in the Swiss Television series Schöni Uussichte and Tag und Nacht.

From 2002 on he was cast in several feature films like Going Private, Grounding – The Last Days of Swissair or Die schwarzen Brüder by Academy Award winner Xavier Koller.

For his performance, he was awarded the TV Filmprice for Best Actor in "Tod in der Lochmatt" and Best Supporting Act in Oro Verde. For his role in Sinestesia he has received the Salento Film Award and for his performance in Going Private the "Swiss Filmprice" as Best Ensemble. He also played in Auf der Strecke ("On the Line") that was nominated for the Academy Awards in the category best short movie.

== Personal life ==
Leonardo Nigro is in a relationship with Mayumi Steiner since 1999 and they have a son since June 2012.

== Filmography ==
=== Film (selection) ===
- 2002: Blue Hope
- 2005: Antibodies
- 2006: Grounding – The Last Days of Swissair
- 2006: Handyman
- 2006: Going Private
- 2007: Auf der Strecke
- 2009: Der Fürsorger
- 2009: Länger Leben
- 2009: Wedding Fever in Campobello
- 2009: Sinestesia
- 2010: 180° – Wenn deine Welt plötzlich Kopf steht
- 2010: Cosa voglio di più
- 2011: Resturlaub
- 2010: Il Venditore di Medicine
- 2013: Die schwarzen Brüder
- 2013: F2014
- 2013: Oro Verde
- 2014: Take Control
- 2014: Vecchi Pazzi
- 2014: Schellenursli

=== Television ===
- 2002: Und die Braut wusste von nichts
- 2004: Piff paff puff
- 2006: Ein Fall für zwei – Doppelpass (episode 235)
- 2007: Chubby Me
- 2007: Schöni Uussichte
- 2007: Tod in der Lochmatt
- 2008: Dr. Psycho – Die Bösen, die Bullen, meine Frau und ich (season 2, episodes 1 and 2)
- 2008: Tag und Nacht (TV)
- 2009: Flug in die Nacht – Das Unglück von Überlingen
- 2009: Tatort – Um jeden Preis (episode 744)
- 2010: Die Käserei in Goldingen
- 2013: Leipzig Homicide – Graf Porno
- 2020: ‘’30 Monedas’’
