= Mordshunger =

2008 film

Mordshunger is a 2008 television film directed by Robert Adrian Pejo. It is based on the 1996 German novel of the same name (ISBN 978-3-924491-71-0, 1996) written by Frank Schätzing.

== Cast ==
In alphabetical order

- Christian Blümel as Panne
- Michou Friesz as Kriminalrätin Truckenbrodt
- Kerstin Gähte as Inka von Barneck
- Niki Greb as Maria Nikolaj
- Henry Hübchen as Fritz von Barneck, Max Hartmann
- Waldemar Kobus as Stephan Bronski
- Heinz W. Krückeberg as Butler Schmitz
- Marleen Lohse as Marion Ried
- Hans Werner Meyer as Romanus Cüpper
- Heiko Pinkowski as Gopper
- Lars Rudolph as Kurt Brauner
- Richard van Weyden as Dr. Heinz Hochstädter
- Stefan Weinert as Herrenausstatter Schramm
- Bettina Zimmermann as Eva Feldkamp
- Johannes Zirner as Jan Rabenhorst
