= Singa Gätgens =

German actress and television host

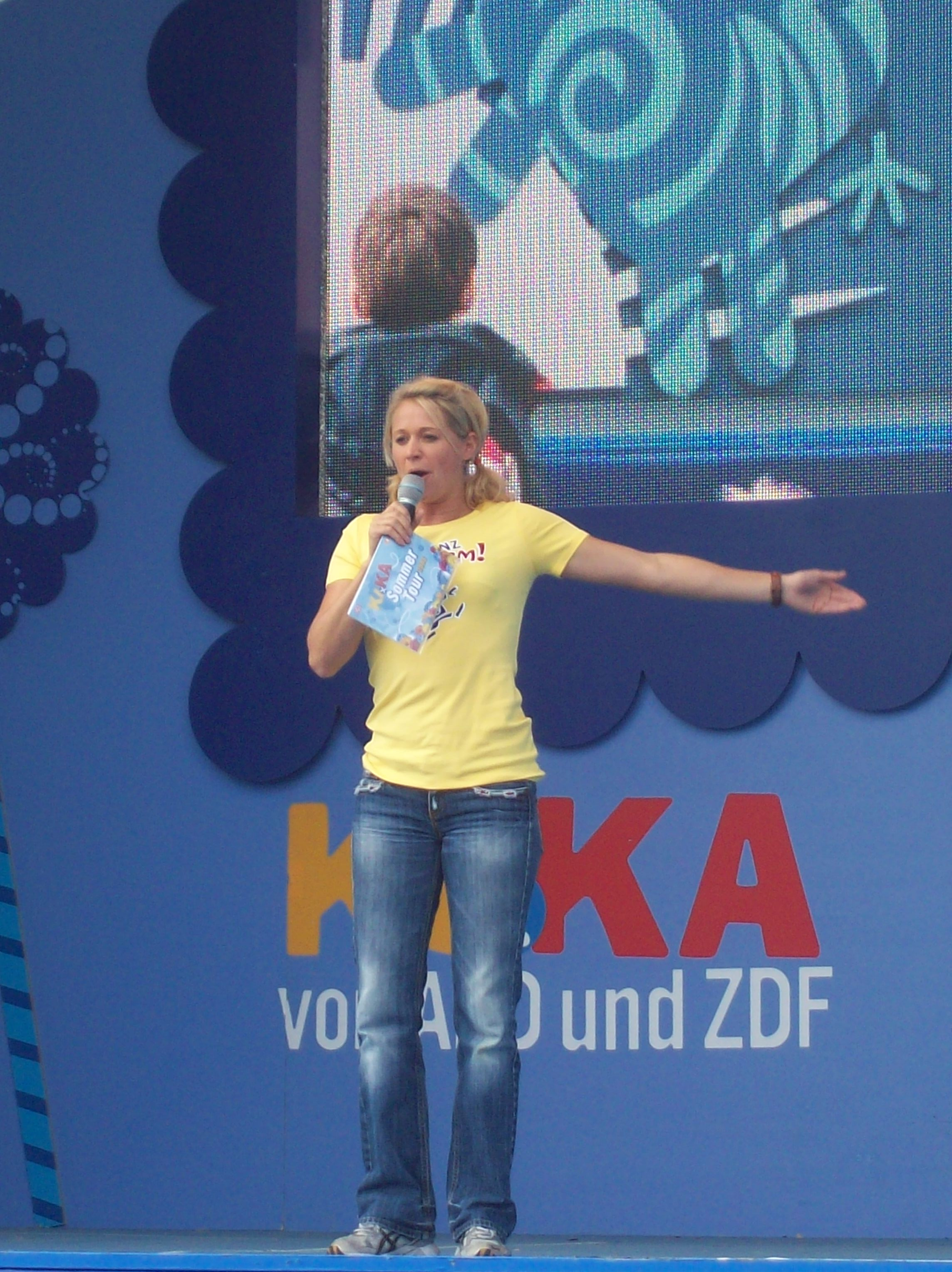
- Gätgens at the "Kika Sommertour" in August 2008
- Born: 1 April 1975 (age 51); Hamburg, Germany

Singa Gätgens (born 1 April 1975) is a German actress and television host. She was the first host at the launch of the KiKa children's TV channel.

== Bio ==
Singa Gätgens was born in Hamburg, Germany.

== Neues vom Süderhof ==
From 1991 to 1993, Gätgens played the role of "Bimbo" in the ARD children's TV series Neues vom Süderhof.

== Work ==
She gained public attention through her work in Gegen den Wind (1995), Schloss Einstein (1998) and Beutolomäus (2001).

== Filmography ==
- Gegen den Wind
- Der Landarzt
- Blankenese
