= Muxmäuschenstill =

- Directed by: Marcus Mittermeier
- Written by: Jan Henrik Stahlberg
- Produced by: Martin Lehwald
- Starring: Jan Henrik Stahlberg; Fritz Roth; Wanda Perdelwitz
- Music by: Phirefones; Julian Boyd
- Distributed by: X Verleih AG (through Warner Bros.)
- Release date: 2004
- Running time: 89 minutes
- Country: Germany
- Language: German

Muxmäuschenstill is a 2004 German black comedy, mockumentary film directed by Marcus Mittermeier, written by Jan Henrik Stahlberg. The film follows a former Philosophy student turned vigilante named Mux (Stahlberg), from Berlin, who wants to right the injustices of the world in his own unique way.

== Plot summary ==
Mux's main motivation is an intense desire to bring justice to rapists, thieves, and vandals in his own way, documenting all his actions through a camcorder held by his colleague Gerd, a somewhat simple-minded former long-term unemployed man in his fifties. Through his accidental involvement in a domestic murder case, he eventually attracts a great deal of media attention, allowing him to expand his operation to a nationwide affair and effectively becoming a crime-fighting entrepreneur. However, his inability to cope with the flawed nature of the human condition proves to be his downfall, as he shoots his girlfriend Kira after discovering that she cheated on him. After a suicide attempt and a hasty burial, Mux hands ownership of his company off to an employee and flees to Italy, taking Gerd with him, as he is a witness to his murder of Kira. Mux dies soon after, getting run over while stepping in the way of a speeding car.

== Critical Review ==
Although being an uncommon film, Muxmäuschenstill has been seen as a continuation of Utopianism and violence in German films. With its Creative chaos characteristic, Muxmäuschenstill portrays a protest of the loss of utopian dreams. Muxmäuschenstill is a black comedy, so academics have explained why Muxmäuschenstill wants to portray certain dark and gloomy scenes as funny and harmless. Both German and English film scholars have attempted to decode the meaning of Muxmäuschenstills black humor, but a consensus has not been reached. Because a consensus has not been reached, scholars have credited the most logical explanation for why Muxmäuschenstill has showcased black comedy is to highlight a certain point of German society that the film makers think is important to take a closer look at. This closer look is meant to bring more awareness to the situation and to further a discussion of ways the German society can improve.

== Awards ==
The film won the Max-Ophüls-Preis 2004 in four categories and was nominated for the Bundesfilmpreis 2004 in the category "Best film".
