= Class Rank (film) =

- Theatrical release poster
- Directed by: Eric Stoltz
- Written by: Benjamin August
- Produced by: Shaun Sanghani; Sandy Stern
- Starring: Skyler Gisondo; Olivia Holt; Kristin Chenoweth; Bruce Dern; Kathleen Chalfant; Nick Krause; Peter Maloney
- Cinematography: Gavin Fisher
- Edited by: Andreas Fehrle
- Music by: Brian Byrne
- Production companies: LB Entertainment; SSS Entertainment
- Distributed by: Cinedigm
- Release dates: April 21, 2017 (NBFF); May 11, 2018 (United States)
- Running time: 101 minutes
- Country: United States
- Language: English
- Budget: $600,000
- Box office: $10,452

Class Rank is a 2017 American romantic comedy film directed by Eric Stoltz and written by Benjamin August. The film stars Skyler Gisondo, Olivia Holt, Kristin Chenoweth, Kathleen Chalfant, Nick Krause, and Peter Maloney.

The film had its world premiere at the Newport Beach Film Festival on April 21, 2017. It had a limited release and went to video on demand on May 11, 2018, by Cinedigm.

== Plot ==
Two high school outsiders join forces in an attempt to overtake the local school board. Guided by their families, they enter the perilous world of politics and in the process, learn a thing or two about love.

== Cast ==
- Skyler Gisondo as Bernard Flannigan, a candidate for the Livingston School Board
- Olivia Holt as Veronica Krauss, Bernard's friend
- Kristin Chenoweth as Janet Krauss, Veronica's mother who works behind the scenes at Law & Order: Special Victims Unit
- Bruce Dern as Oswald Flannigan, Bernard's retired grandfather.
- Kathleen Chalfant as Barbara, the editor-in-chief of the local newspaper
- Nick Krause as the Bagger, a friend of Bernard's who works at the local supermarket
- Peter Maloney as Mr. Del Tufo, a member of the school board

== Production ==
On November 20, 2015, it was announced that Eric Stoltz would direct the comedy film Class Rank, based on the script by Benjamin August. Producer would be SSS Entertainment's Shaun Sanghani and Single Cell Pictures' Sandy Stern.

Principal photography on the film began on November 30, 2015, in Alexandria, Louisiana.

== Release ==
The film had its world premiere at the Newport Beach Film Festival on April 21, 2017. Shortly after, Cinedigm acquired distribution rights to the film, and set it for a May 11, 2018, release.

== Reception ==
On review aggregator website Rotten Tomatoes, the film holds an approval rating of 86%, based on 14 reviews, and an average rating of 6.32/10.
