= Wedding Fever in Campobello =

2009 German film

- Directed by: Neele Vollmar
- Starring: Christian Ulmen; Mina Tander
- Music by: Niki Reiser
- Distributed by: Constantin Film (Germany); 20th Century Fox (Italy)
- Release date: 6 August 2009
- Running time: 96 minutes
- Countries: Germany; Italy
- Languages: German; Italian

Wedding Fever in Campobello (German: Maria, ihm schmeckt’s nicht!) is a 2009 German comedy film based on the novel of the same name by Jan Weiler.

== Plot ==
Jan (Christian Ulmen) wants to marry Sara (Mina Tander). When her Italian father Antonio (Lino Banfi) tells them that the wedding has to be in Campobello Jan is faced with a string of challenges.

== Cast ==
- Christian Ulmen - Jan
- Mina Tander - Sara
- Lino Banfi - Antonio
- Leonardo Nigro - young Antonio
- Maren Kroymann - Ursula
- Marleen Lohse - young Ursula
- Gundi Ellert - Gisela
- Peter Prager - Eberhard
- Sergio Rubini - Egidio
