= Benjamin August =

American screenwriter

- Born: 1979 (age 46–47)
- Occupations: Casting director Screenwriter

Benjamin August (born c. 1979) is an American casting director and screenwriter known for Remember (2015), The Swimmer and The Thief. He won the Canadian Screen Award for Best Original Screenplay at the 4th Canadian Screen Awards for Remember, a film directed by Atom Egoyan.

== Biography ==
Originally from Livingston, New Jersey, August graduated from Livingston High School in 1997. He later spent time teaching English as a second language in Vietnam, during which he wrote Remember, his first feature film screenplay. His other credits as a writer include Class Rank (2017) and The Billion Dollar Spy.

His second screenplay, Class Rank, under director Eric Stoltz was released in 2016.

As a producer, he worked at American game shows Don't Forget the Lyrics (2007–2008) and Fear Factor (2003, 2005). He previously worked as a casting director on Fear Factor.

August appeared as an actor in Broken Pipe Dreams and Replication Theory movies in 2007.

=== Awards ===
In 2016, he won the Canadian Screen Award for Best Original Screenplay at the 4th Canadian Screen Awards for Remember, a film directed by Atom Egoyan.

In 2015, August was nominated for the Best Screenplay for a Canadian Film Remember at Vancouver Film Critics Circle (VFCC) Award.
