= Remember (2015 film) =

- Theatrical release poster
- Directed by: Atom Egoyan
- Written by: Benjamin August
- Produced by: Robert Lantos; Ari Lantos
- Starring: Christopher Plummer; Bruno Ganz; Jürgen Prochnow; Heinz Lieven; Henry Czerny; Dean Norris; Martin Landau
- Cinematography: Paul Sarossy
- Edited by: Christopher Donaldson
- Music by: Mychael Danna
- Production companies: Egoli Tossell Film; Serendipity Point Films
- Distributed by: Entertainment One (Canada); Tiberius Film (Germany); IM Global (International)
- Release dates: September 10, 2015 (Venice); October 23, 2015 (Canada); December 31, 2015 (Germany)
- Running time: 94 minutes
- Countries: Canada; Germany
- Languages: English; German
- Budget: $9.6 million
- Box office: $4.2 million

Remember is a 2015 drama thriller film directed by Atom Egoyan and written by Benjamin August. Starring Christopher Plummer, Bruno Ganz, Jürgen Prochnow, Heinz Lieven, Henry Czerny, Dean Norris and Martin Landau, it was a co-production of Canada and Germany. The plot follows an elderly Holocaust survivor with dementia who sets out to kill a Nazi war criminal in retaliation for the death of his family and was inspired by August's consideration that there were fewer parts for senior actors in recent years.

After a screening at the 72nd Venice International Film Festival, it was theatrically released in Canada on October 23, 2015, in Germany on December 31, 2015, and in the United States by A24 on March 11, 2016. Remember received mostly positive reviews and won a few film festival awards. At the 4th Canadian Screen Awards, August received the Award for Best Original Screenplay and Remember was also nominated for Best Motion Picture.

== Plot ==
In a New York City nursing home, Auschwitz concentration camp survivor Zev Guttman, an 89-year-old dementia patient, awakens looking for his wife, Ruth, who died two weeks prior. Another elderly patient and fellow Auschwitz survivor, the incapacitated Max Rosenbaum, reminds Zev of what he promised to do when Ruth died. Max has continually reminded Zev that their families were murdered at the camp by the Blockführer Otto Wallisch, who was believed to have immigrated to the U.S. under the false name Rudy Kurlander. The Simon Wiesenthal Center has located four Rudy Kurlanders, but there is no evidence to arrest any of them. Max reminds Zev that they are the only two who can still recognize Wallisch.

Max convinces Zev to avenge their families by seeking out and killing Wallisch and provides him written instructions to follow. Zev leaves the nursing home in a taxi and boards a train to Cleveland as a Silver Alert is issued for his disappearance. He has moments of confusion but he relies on the letter, which reminds him Ruth is dead, and Max arranges his travel. Max directs Zev to a gun shop in Cleveland, where he buys a Glock 17, and then to the four men in the U.S. and Canada named Rudy Kurlander, one of whom is the former Blockführer.

Zev confronts the first Rudy Kurlander, a German veteran of World War II, in his home, but this Kurlander proves that he served in the North African Campaign and was never near Auschwitz. Zev finds the second Rudy Kurlander in a nursing home in Hearst, Ontario, but he turns out to have been a prisoner in Auschwitz also, sent there as a homosexual, which he proves by showing Zev his arm tattoo.

Zev travels to Boise, and arrives at the house of the third Rudy Kurlander in Bruneau, Idaho. His son, John, an Idaho state trooper, tells Zev that his father died three months ago. John, who thinks Zev is an old friend of his father's from the war, shows him his father's Nazi memorabilia but reveals, after several glasses of whiskey, that his father was only a boy and a cook during the war. When John, who is a neo-Nazi, sees Zev's tattoo and realizes he is Jewish, he becomes enraged and lets loose his German shepherd, Eva (named after Eva Braun). Zev shoots the dog and then John in self-defense, collapses in exhaustion on John's bed and leaves the house in the morning.

In Reno, Nevada, Zev falls in the street and is taken to the hospital, which contacts his relieved son, who travels to Reno. After a young girl reads his letter to him, Zev leaves for South Lake Tahoe, California by taxi. After a night in a hotel where Zev is forced to use his credit card, he arrives at the home of the fourth Rudy Kurlander and his family, and recognizes him from his voice as the Auschwitz Blockführer. Rudy is happy to see Zev and greets him very warmly. Zev's son, who traced him through his credit card and then the taxi service, arrives to witness Zev threatening to shoot Rudy's granddaughter unless he confesses "the truth" to everyone. Rudy admits to his daughter and granddaughter that he was in the SS and killed "many" people. Rudy admits his real name is Kunibert Sturm, and that Zev is confused: he is actually Otto Wallisch. They were both Blockführers, and after the war, tattooed each other with consecutive numbers to pose as Jewish survivors. Shocked, Zev shoots Sturm and then, declaring "I remember", fatally shoots himself.

Back in New York, the horrified nursing home residents watch television news reports of the murder/suicide. Max reveals that he recognized Zev as Wallisch when he arrived at the nursing home, and that Wallisch and Sturm killed his family. On Max's desk, a copy of his letter to Zev is shown along with a picture of Otto Wallisch and a handwritten confession by Max.

== Cast ==
- Christopher Plummer as Zev Guttman
- Bruno Ganz as Rudy Kurlander #1
- Jürgen Prochnow as Rudy Kurlander #3
- Heinz Lieven as Rudy Kurlander #2
- Henry Czerny as Charles Guttman
- Dean Norris as John Kurlander
- Martin Landau as Max Rosenbaum

== Production ==
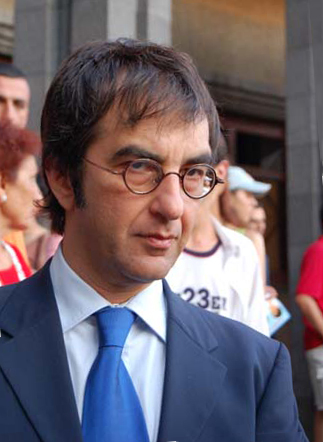
Filmmaker Atom Egoyan said he directed Remember after being drawn to its unconventional story.

Benjamin August, a Jewish writer from New Jersey living in Los Angeles and who had never written a produced film before, told Canadian Jewish News that the concept of Remember "started... with wanting to write a movie starring an older man." He felt elderly actors received few leading parts and that old characters are sympathetic. August sent his screenplay in to Canadian producer Robert Lantos, who envisioned Egoyan as the ideal director.

On April 30, 2014, it was announced that the film would be directed by Egoyan, and would star Christopher Plummer, Martin Landau, Dean Norris, Bruno Ganz, Heinz Lieven, and Jürgen Prochnow. Egoyan said the film came at a time when the last of the Holocaust survivors and criminals were alive, and that trials underway in Germany also made the film timely. Time magazine specifically noted that the trial of Reinhold Hanning was in the news. The director claimed to find August's story unconventional and a "high-risk venture". Plummer, who was Egoyan's only choice for the part of Zev, stated he was also attracted to the project for its unconventional take on a historic subject.

Principal photography began on July 14, 2014, with scenes filmed in Sault Ste. Marie, Ontario and northern Ontario. For the scene in which Zev kills John Kurlander, Egoyan intended to use a stunt double for Plummer, but Plummer demanded he perform the scene himself. Plummer later told CBC News, "For a moment, I was a little bit pissed off.... Because it made me feel suddenly rather old." However, he admitted firing the gun "frightened" him because "they pack the kick of an elephant" and that he was "terrified" of the dog in the scene. Dean Norris said Plummer used this fear in his performance. The film had a $13 million budget.

== Release ==
On May 11, 2015, A24 acquired distribution rights to the film. Remember was screened in the main competition section of the 72nd Venice International Film Festival on September 10, 2015, where it received a 10-minute standing ovation, and also screened at the 2015 Toronto International Film Festival. The film was released in Canada on October 23, 2015. The film was released on DirecTV Cinema in the United States on December 17, 2015. The film was originally scheduled to open in the U.S. in a limited release on January 15, 2016, but was delayed until February 12. It was then delayed again until March 11, 2016.

== Reception ==
=== Box office ===
According to Box Office Mojo, the film grossed $1,184,564 in North America and $2,507,927 in other territories for a worldwide total of $3,692,491. The film made $800,000 in Canada, which was considered disappointing.

=== Critical response ===
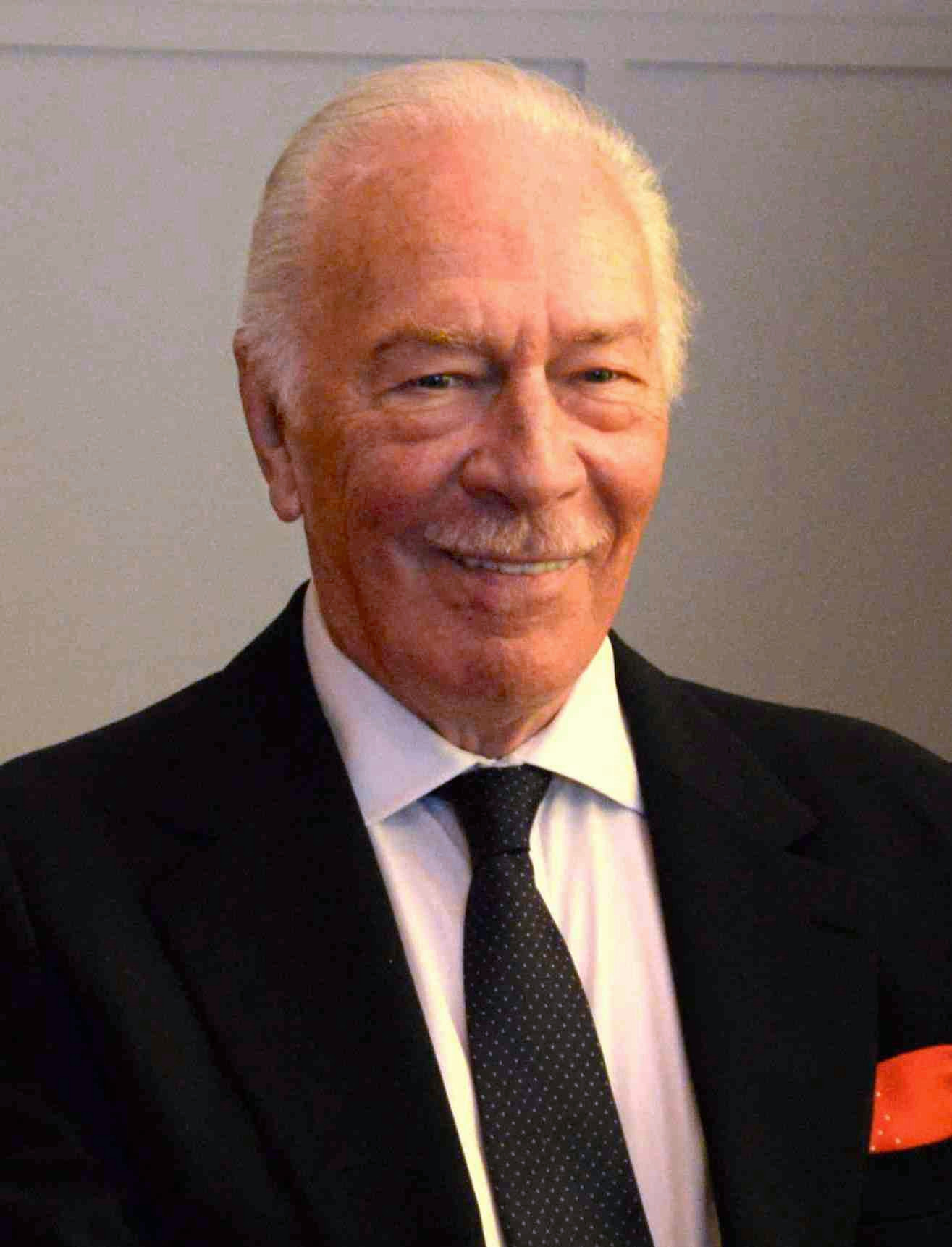
Critics praised Christopher Plummer's performance, and he was nominated for Best Actor at the Canadian Screen Awards.

On Rotten Tomatoes, the film has an approval rating of 69%, based on 100 reviews, with an average rating of 6.4/10. The site's critical consensus reads, "Remember risks wandering into exploitative territory, but it's bolstered by some of Egoyan's best latter-day directing and a typically stellar performance from Christopher Plummer". Metacritic reports a score of 52 out of 100, based on 25 critics, indicating "mixed or average reviews".

Jeryl Brunner of Parade called it "one of the most powerful and unique Nazi revenge films to come around in a long time." Robbie Collin of The Daily Telegraph called the John Kurlander scene "supremely tense" and the film more appealing than Egoyan's last films. John Lasser of IGN wrote "One of the things Egoyan does brilliantly here is to not only offer the larger tale but to work in incredibly tense smaller moments as well," and praised Plummer for "an utterly heartbreaking performance." Tashauna Reid of CBC News wrote "Egoyan takes audiences on an intricate, thrilling ride, with a few surprises along the way," called Plummer's acting "riveting," and Martin Landau and Dean Norris "equally strong." Kate Taylor of The Globe and Mail wrote, "Remember is admirable– remarkably, it builds a drama of genuine suspense around the quest for vengeance of a forgetful 90-year-old– but it is also frustratingly limited in ways that can't really be discussed without revealing its surprise ending."

Jake Wilson of The Sydney Morning Herald gave a more mixed review, judging the film to have a "gimmicky script by newcomer Benjamin August that borrows heavily from Christopher Nolan's Memento." Michael Rechtshaffen of the Los Angeles Times also wrote "Remember benefits mightily from a quietly commanding Christopher Plummer performance that almost makes you forget the wonky plot logic." Richard Roeper panned the film as "bold but often ludicrous." Guy Lodge of Variety also disapproved, writing the film "puts a creditably sincere spin on material that is silly at best. At worst, tyro writer Benjamin August's screenplay is a crass attempt to fashion a Memento-style puzzle narrative from post-Holocaust trauma."

In January 2017, The A.V. Club posted an analysis of the scene where Zev meets the character John Kurlander. The review noted some surface-level similarities between Norris' work as John and his role as Hank Schrader on Breaking Bad, but its main focus was on how events in 2016 and growing vocalization of white supremacists served to make the scene much more disturbing and realistic than it felt when the film premiered in 2015.

=== Accolades ===
Award	Date of ceremony	Category	Recipient(s)	Result	Ref(s)
Calgary International Film Festival	2015	Audience Choice - Narrative Feature		Won (Note: Shared with Room)	
Canadian Screen Awards	13 March 2016	Best Motion Picture	Robert Lantos and Ari Lantos	Nominated	
Canadian Screen Awards	13 March 2016	Best Original Screenplay	Benjamin August	Won	
Canadian Screen Awards	13 March 2016	Best Actor	Christopher Plummer	Nominated	
Canadian Screen Awards	13 March 2016	Best Visual Effects	Eric Doiron, Sarah Wormsbecher, Nathan Larouche, Anthony De Chellis, Geoff D.E. Scott, Jason Snea, Joel Chambers, Kaiser Thomas, Lon Molnar and Rob Kennedy	Nominated	
Canadian Society of Cinematographers	2 April 2016	Theatrical Feature Cinematography	Paul Sarossy	Nominated	
David di Donatello	18 April 2016	Best Foreign Film		Nominated	
Hanoi International Film Festival	5 November 2016	Best Feature Film	Atom Egoyan	Won	
Hanoi International Film Festival	5 November 2016	Best Main Actor	Christopher Plummer	Won	
Mar del Plata Film Festival	2016	Audience Award	Atom Egoyan	Won	
Saturn Awards	28 June 2017	Best Independent Film		Nominated	
Vancouver Film Critics Circle	6 January 2016	Best Director of a Canadian Film	Atom Egoyan	Nominated	
Vancouver Film Critics Circle	6 January 2016	Best Actor in a Canadian Film	Christopher Plummer	Nominated	
Vancouver Film Critics Circle	6 January 2016	Best Screenplay for a Canadian Film	Benjamin August	Nominated	
Venice Film Festival	2 – 12 September 2015	Vittorio Veneto Film Festival Award	Atom Egoyan	Won	
Women Film Critics Circle	2016	Best Actor	Christopher Plummer	Nominated	

== Remake ==
A South Korean remake, also titled Remember, was released in 2022.

== See also ==
- List of Canadian films of 2015
- List of Holocaust films
- The Man in the Glass Booth, 1975 American film that also plays on confusion of identity between Holocaust victim and perpetrator
