= Peter Maloney (actor) =

American actor (born 1944)

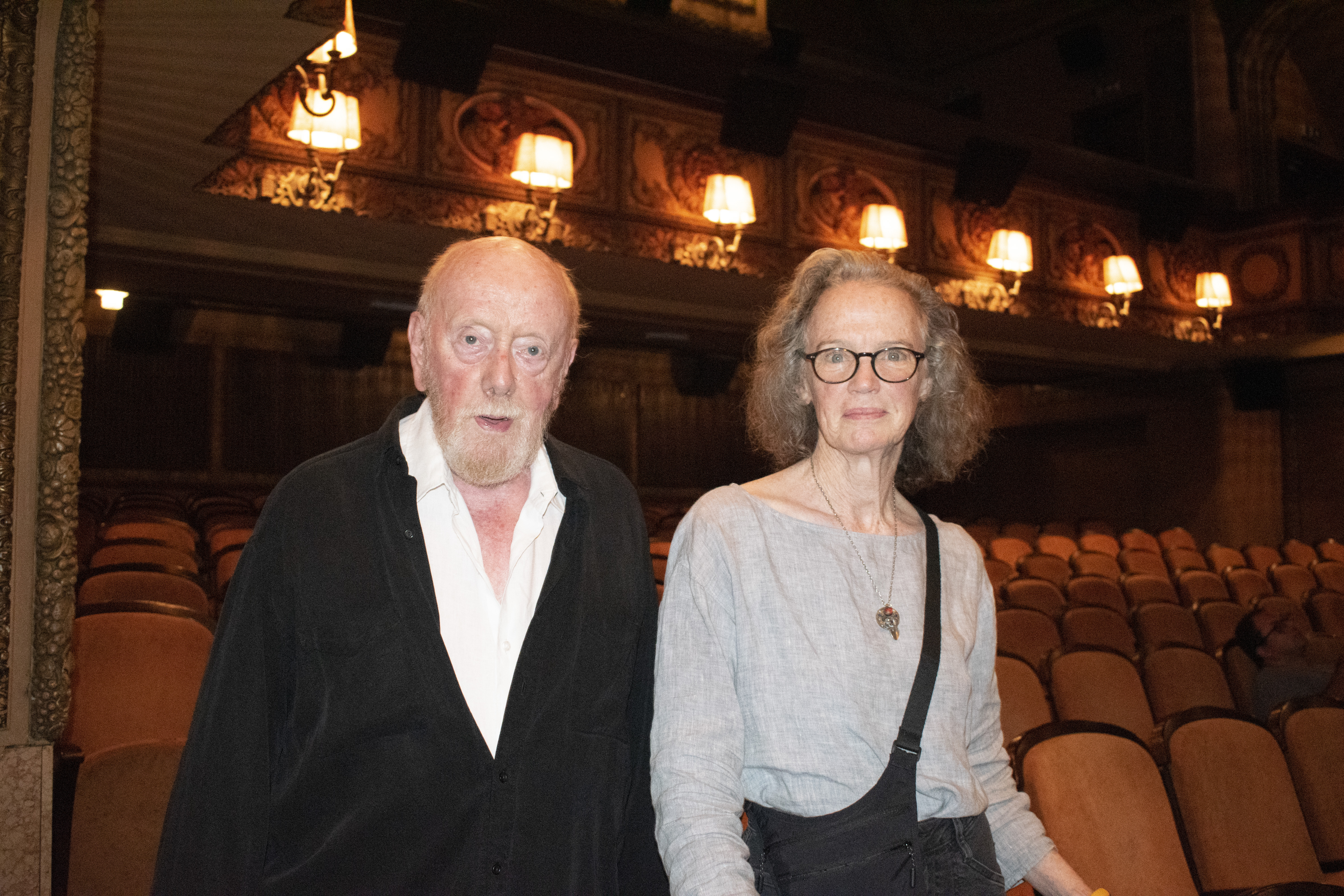
- Peter Maloney with his wife, Kristin Griffith.
- Born: 1944; Chicago, Illinois, U.S.
- Occupation: Actor

Peter Maloney (born 1944) is an American actor, director, and playwright who has appeared in film, television, and theater for over 50 years.

== Career ==
In 2021, he is a member of the Atlantic Theater Company, involved in 23 different productions, including The Duck Variations and The Water Engine both written by David Mamet, and The Voysey Inheritance. He joined the Ensemble Studio Theater, and the Irish Repertory Theatre, where he was involved in Ernest in Love, A Wonderful Life (musical), Port Authority (play), and The Quare Land. He is a former member of the Joseph Chaikin's Open Theater, where he participated in many productions such as The Serpent, Ubu Cocu and Endgame.

Maloney's television and film credits are extensive (see introduction), and span from 1968 to 2020.

Maloney was a drama teacher and director of students for five years at the Juilliard School of performing arts. Maloney has worked in the acting industry for over 50 years (2020). He is a life member of the Actors Studio and a New Dramatists alumnus.

== Filmography ==
=== Film ===
Year	Title	Role	Notes
1968	Greetings	Earl Roberts	
1969	Putney Swope	Putney's Chauffeur	
1970	Hi, Mom!	Pharmacist	
1975	Capone	Jake Guzik	
1979	Hair	Court Clerk	Uncredited
1979	A Little Romance	Martin	
1979	Breaking Away	Doctor	
1979	The Amityville Horror	Newspaper Clerk	
1979	Night-Flowers	Supermarket Cashier	
1980	Hide in Plain Sight	Lee McHugh	
1980	The Children	Frank	
1982	The Magic Mountain	Dr. Blumenkohl	
1982	The Thing	George Bennings	
1985	Desperately Seeking Susan	Ian	
1986	Manhunter	Dr. Dominick Princi	
1989	Lost Angels	Dr. Peter Ames	
1990	Tune in Tomorrow	Luther Aslinger	
1991	JFK	Colonel Finck	
1992	The Public Eye	Federal Watchman	
1993	Robot in the Family	Dr. Clayhand	
1995	Jeffrey	Dad	
1996	Extreme Measures	Mr. Randall	
1996	Thinner	Biff Quigley	
1996	The Crucible	Dr. Griggs	
1997	Private Parts	Researcher	
1997	Boys Life 2	Senior	
1997	Washington Square	Jacob Webber (Notary)	
1998	The Object of My Affection	Desk Clerk	
1998	Curtain Call	Maurice	
1999	Summer of Sam	Detective Timothy Dowd	
2000	Boiler Room	Dr. Jacobs	
2000	Requiem for a Dream	Dr. Pill	
2001	K-PAX	Duncan Flynn	
2002	Anything But Love	Cliff Mendelson	
2003	Shortcut to Happiness	John Hardy	
2009	Cayman Went	Seaver Weston	
2013	Brightest Star	Uncle Ivan	
2015	As Good As You	Ray – Jo's Dad	
2017	Class Rank	Mr. Del Tufo	

=== Television ===
Year	Title	Role	Notes
1968	N.Y.P.D.	Astor	Episode: "Nothing Is Real But the Dead: Part 2"
1975	Columbo	Artie Podell	Episode: "Troubled Waters"
1979	Sanctuary of Fear	Eli Clay	Television film
1979	My Old Man	Veterinarian	Television film
1980	This Year's Blonde	Darryl F. Zanuck	Television film
1980	Revenge of the Stepford Wives	Henry the Druggist	Television film
1982	Lou Grant	Alex Conrad	Episode: "Ghosts"
1982	Callahan	Mustaf	Television film
1982	St. Elsewhere	Dr. Burgess	Episode: "Bypass"
1986	Spenser: For Hire	Red Donnelly	Episode: "Home Is the Hero"
1987	CBS Summer Playhouse	The Fixer	Episode: "The Saint in Manhattan"
1989	Great Performances	Mr. Webb	Episode: "Our Town"
1989	Money, Power, Murder.	Charlie	Television film
1990	Largo Desolato	Second Sidney	Television film
1992	Citizen Cohn	Ray Kaplan	Television film
1992	All My Children	Mr. Myles	Episode #1.5909
1993	CBS Schoolbreak Special	Arthur Rowe	Episode: "Love Off Limits"
1993	Alex Haley's Queen	Perkins	2 episodes
1993, 2002	Law & Order	Father Paul / Lab Technician	2 episodes
1994	Assault at West Point	William Smith Michie	Television film
1996	Remember WENN	Mr. Gianetti	Episode: "On the Air"
1997	Dellaventura	McClancy	Episode: "The Biggest Miracle"
1998	Thicker Than Blood	James	Television film
2000	Ed	Mr. Stansley	Episode: "Your Life Is Now"
2001, 2006	Law & Order: Criminal Intent	Teddy Mercer	2 episodes
2003	Queens Supreme	Plaintiff's Lawyer	Episode: "Pilot"
2004	Law & Order: Special Victims Unit	Geoffrey Downs	Episode: "Charisma"
2006–2009	Rescue Me	Uncle Red	3 episodes
2007	Gossip Girl	Priest	Episode: "Seventeen Candles"
2012	A Gifted Man	Mr. Janowitz	Episode: "In Case of Co-Dependants"
2014	Black Box	Harry	Episode: "Forget Me"
2014	The Knick	Drunk Barber	Episode: "They Capture the Heat"
2014	Gotham	Isaac Steiner	Episode: "Viper"
2016	Bull	Judge	Episode: "Light My Fire"
2017	The Good Fight	Doctor	Episode: "Henceforth Known as Property"
2017	Crashing	Weird Old Man	Episode: "Yard Sale"
2019	Dickinson	Doctor Brewster	Episode: "A Brief But Patient Illness"
2019	The Marvelous Mrs. Maisel	John	Episode: "It's the Sixties, Man!"
2020	Katy Keene	board member No. 1	Episode: "Pilot"
2020	Dispatches from Elsewhere	Boris	2 episodes
