= On the Line (2007 film) =

On the line
- Directed by: Reto Caffi
- Starring: Roeland Wiesnekker; Catherine Janke; André Meyer; Julie Bräuning; Leonardo Nigro; Janic Halioua; Roland Bonjour
- Music by: Ivo Ubezio
- Release date: 2007
- Running time: 31 minutes
- Country: Switzerland

On the Line (German: Auf der Strecke) is a Swiss German/German short film. Directed by Reto Caffi, the film is also the recipient of multiple international awards, including a Brooklyn Festival Award. Written by Caffi and Naomi Westerman, it stars Roeland Wiesnekker, Roland Bonjour, Janic Halioua, and Julie Bräuning.

== Plot ==
A security guard named Rolf (Wiesnekker) spends his days trying to prevent shoplifting at a department store. He also makes time to interact with the bookshop's clerk Sarah, whom he has a crush on. One night as he is on the train, he sees Sarah enter with another man. Believing this man to be her boyfriend, Rolf is filled with jealousy. After the pair have an argument, Sarah exits the train. Shortly after, a group of teens attack the man while Rolf decides not to intervene and gets off at the next stop. The victim, who is later revealed to be Sarah's brother, dies as a result of the attack. Filled with regret about not intervening to prevent the death, Rolf develops a closer relationship with Sarah. The pair spend a night drinking when Sarah has a breakdown over her brother's death. Rolf consoles her but ultimately does not reveal his role in her brother's death.

== Accolades ==
Award	Date of ceremony	Category	Recipient(s)	Result	Ref.
Clermont-Ferrand International Short Film Festival	2008	Grand Prix	Reto Caffi	Won	
Academy Awards	2009	Academy Award for Best Live Action Short Film	Reto Caffi	Nominated	
