= Inez Bjørg David =

Danish actress

- Born: February 6, 1982 (age 44); Århus, Denmark
- Occupations: Actress, Yoga teacher
- Years active: 2000–present
- Known for: German film and television roles
- Notable work: Love in Thoughts, Verbotene Liebe
- Awards: Next Economy Award (2016)

Inez Bjørg David (born 6 February 1982 in Århus) is a Danish actress who has appeared primarily in German productions.

== Life ==
She went to a theatre school in Copenhagen and took private acting classes. She appeared in many German movies, tv series and soap operas.

Inez also works as a Yoga teacher and regularly holds Yoga classes in and around Berlin.

Inez is an ambassador of the World Future Council and fighting for the rights of women. She is a member of the advisory board of the organization "Cradle to Cradle e.V.", which promotes eco-efficiency. In 2016 she received the German "Next Economy Award" for her work on sustainability.
