= Brigitte Blobel =

German writer (1942–2024)

- Born: 21 November 1942; Hamburg, Germany
- Died: 7 August 2024 (aged 81)
- Citizenship: German
- Occupations: Novelist; screenwriter; journalist

Brigitte Blobel (21 November 1942 – 7 August 2024) was a German novelist and screenwriter from Hamburg. A prolific writer of German books, she is known for writing the Neues vom Süderhof books, on which the TV show was based.

== Personal life and death ==
Brigitte Blobel married to Wolfram Bickerich in 1990. From 1999 onward they lived mostly on their small farm in Mallorca or in Hamburg. Blobel had two adult children from her first marriage. She died on 7 August 2024, at the age of 81.

== Selected bibliography ==
=== Children's and young adult books ===
- Falsche Freundschaft: Gefahr aus dem Internet (2006)
- Eine Mutter zu viel: Adoptiert wider Wissen (2009)
- Rote Linien – Ritzen bis aufs Blut (2010)
- Herzsprung: Wenn Liebe missbraucht wird (1996)
- Die Clique: Wenn die Gruppe Druck macht (2010)
- Alessas Schuld – Die Geschichte eines Amoklaufs (2007)
- Liebe wie die Hölle – Bedroht von einem Stalker (2007)
- Meine schöne Schwester – Der Weg in die Magersucht (2007)

=== Novels ===
- Bis ins Koma (2011)
- Party Girl 2009
- Blind Date (2011)
- Drama Princess (2008)

=== Diary series ===
- Neues vom Süderhof (1991–1997)
- Paulas Sommer (2007)

== Films (screenplays written) ==
- Una ragazza speciale (A special girl) (2000)
