= Tim Küchler =

German actor

Tim Küchler (born 29 July 1986) is a German actor. Küchler was born in Hamburg. From 1995 to 1997, he portrayed Benny Brendal in 39 episodes (seasons 3, 4, and 5) of Neues vom Süderhof. From 1998 to 2001, he played a similar role in the children's series, Die Kinder vom Alstertal.
