= Cleo (2019 German film) =

2019 film

- Directed by: Erik Schmitt
- Starring: Marleen Lohse; Jeremy Mockridge
- Release date: 8 February 2019 (BIFF)
- Running time: 99 minutes
- Country: Germany
- Language: German

Cleo is a 2019 German drama film directed by Erik Schmitt.

== Plot ==
Cleo works for a tourist office in Berlin and has lived a lonely, isolated life since her father died when Cleo was ten years old. Cleo blames herself for her father's death and has been hoping since childhood that a magical watch hidden in the Sass brothers' lost treasure will help her to turn back time and save her father. When she meets the young adventurer Paul one day, who has found a map that should lead to the treasure, she joins him, and Cleo begins a journey through Berlin's history, back to the beginning of time.

== Cast ==
- Marleen Lohse - Cleo
- Jeremy Mockridge - Paul
- Max Mauff - Zille
- Heiko Pinkowski - Günni
- Fabian Busch - Bernd
- Anna Böttcher - Bärbel
- Folke Renken - Historiker
- Andrea Sawatzki - Chefin
