= Jan Fedder =

German actor (1955–2019)

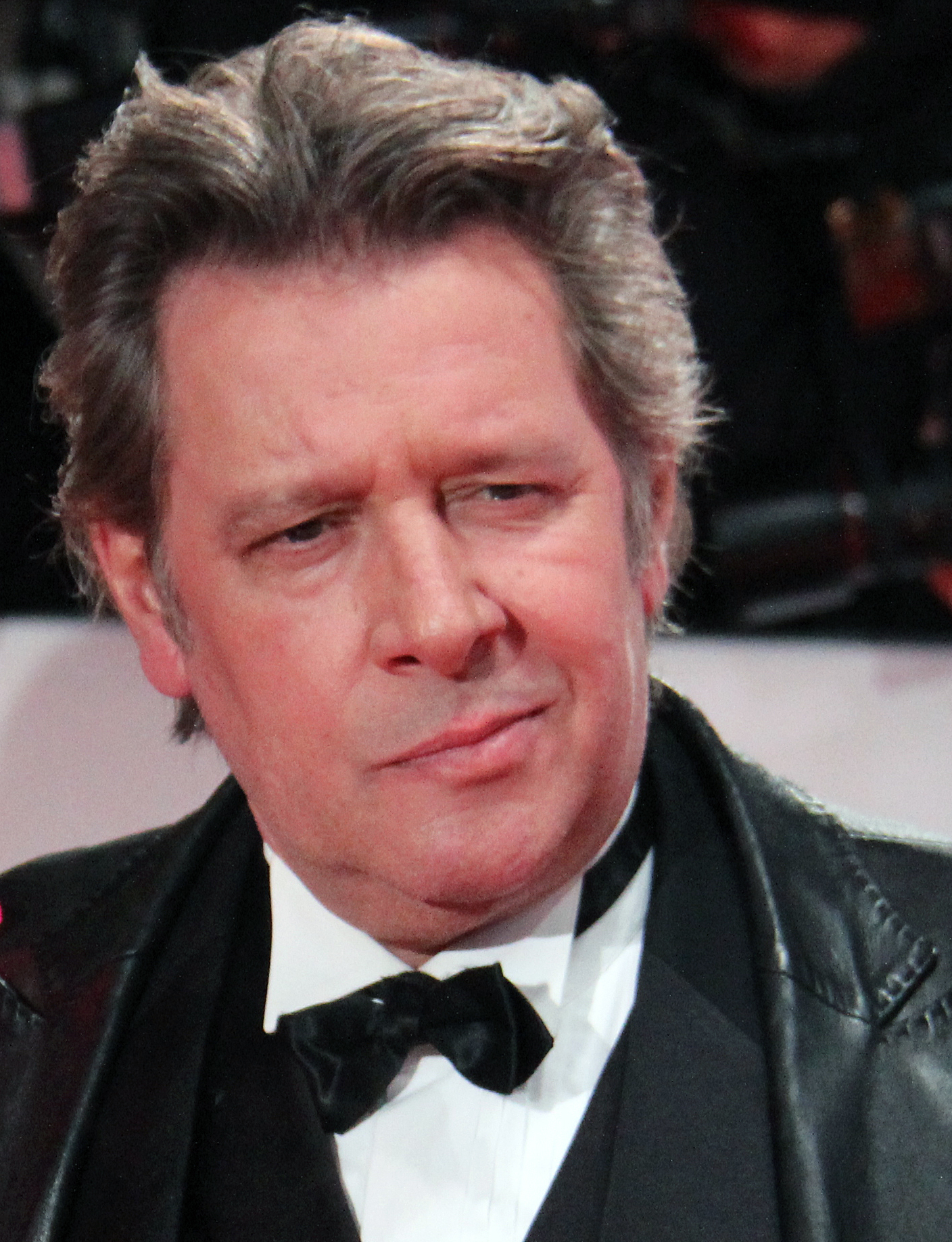
- Fedder in 2012
- Born: 14 January 1955; Hamburg, West Germany
- Died: 30 December 2019 (aged 64); Hamburg, Germany
- Resting place: Ohlsdorf Cemetery
- Occupation: Actor
- Years active: 1969–2019
- Notable work: Das Boot, Großstadtrevier

Jan Fedder (German: [jan ˈfɛ.dɐ]; 14 January 1955 – 30 December 2019) was a German actor, born in Hamburg. He was best known for his role as police officer Dirk Matthies in the German television show Großstadtrevier. He was also known for his role as the crude Petty Officer Pilgrim in Wolfgang Petersen's film, Das Boot. Fedder was especially known for playing typical Northern German characters.

Fedder was diagnosed with oral cancer in 2012. He died on 30 December 2019 in Hamburg of the disease, aged 64. He had been in a wheelchair for the past few months of his life.

== Filmography ==
Year	Title	Role	Notes
1969	Reisedienst Schwalbe	Boy in cave	TV miniseries, 1 episode
1981	Das Boot	Pilgrim	
1982	Smiley's People	Young Man at Water Camp	TV miniseries, 1 episode
1983	Die leichten Zeiten sind vorbei	Pit	
1984	No Time for Tears: The Bachmeier Case	Jan	
1984	Der Sohn des Bullen	Kottbus	
1985	Deadly Twins	Harry DeRomeo	
1987	Jacob hinter der blauen Tür	Ulli	
1988	Non-Stop Trouble with the Experts	Kerschke	
1989	Umwege nach Venedig		
1990	Werner – Beinhart!	Herbert / Bauarbeiter	Voice
1990	Land in Sicht	Landlord	
1991	Superstau	Hinnerk	
1992–2020	Großstadtrevier	Dirk Matthies	TV series, 377 episodes, last role
1993	Verlassen Sie bitte Ihren Mann!	Rodkin	
1997–2019	Neues aus Büttenwarder	Kurt Brakelmann	TV series, 79 episodes
1999	Der Hochstapler	Klaus Hartmann	TV film
1999	Werner – Volles Rooäää!!!	Herbert	Voice
1999	Die Strandclique	Alfred Waalkes	2 episodes - S2-03 & S2-04 Geld stinkt nicht - Sachsen können alles
2006	Der Mann im Strom	Jan Hinrichs	TV film
2008	The Lightship	Kapitän Johann Freytag	TV film
2008	U-900	Kaleu Rönberg	
2009	Soul Kitchen	Meyer	
2012	Der Hafenpastor	Pastor Stefan Book	
2013	Ohne Gnade!	Tattoo-Adler	
2015	Der Hafenpastor und das graue Kind	Pastor Stefan Book	
2016	Der Hafenpastor und das Blaue vom Himmel	Pastor Stefan Book	
