= Neues vom Süderhof =

1990s German children's television series

- Opening title of Neues vom Süderhof
- Created by: Brigitte Blobel, Marlies Kerremans
- Country of origin: Germany
- No. of seasons: Süderhof I (1991–1993) Süderhof II (1995–1997)
- No. of episodes: Süderhof I: 13 Süderhof II: 39

Production
- Running time: 25 minutes

Original release
- Network: Süderhof I: ARD Süderhof II: NDR
- Release: December 31, 1991

Neues vom Süderhof (lit. 'News from the Suderhof') is a German children's television series. The series centers around the five Brendel children who live on the Süderhof farm. Dr. Günther Brendel is a veterinarian, and his wife Sonia is an author who is writing a book about parenting. They live with their two daughters, Bimbo and Molle, and next-door live Grandma and Grandpa Brendel. After Günther's brother and sister-in-law are killed in a plane crash, Sonia and Günther adopt their children, Dany, Peggy, and Benny. Thus, the series chronicles the experiences of these five children and their lives on the Süderhof farm.

The series was very popular with children and young adults in Germany and was re-aired multiple times. Many episodes were also shown on the popular children's entertainment show Tigerenten Club.

== Plot ==
Günter Brendel is a veterinarian on the Süderhof farm, and his wife Sonia is writing a book about parenting. Bimbo and Molle are Günter and Sonia Brendel's children. In the opening episode, Günter's brother, Tom, and his wife, Francis, were killed in a plane crash. Their three orphaned children, Dany, Peggy, and Benny, are then adopted into the Brendel family.

It is common for the Brendel children to meet neighboring children, both on the farm and at school. These children include Bastian Broders, Henner, and Tom. The children are taught by a variety of teachers, including the English teacher Dolores "Dolly" Malzahn, Dr. Theiss, and Dr. Funke. Dr. Brendel employs an assistant vet named Christine. They also meet other adults around town, including Mayor Feddersen, Jo, and Bob Anderson.

The themes of the show center on the struggles of day-to-day living on a farm in a small town, financial and social struggles, and familial relationships. The Brendel children deal with the grief over the passing of loved ones and pets and academic struggles. The Brendel adults deal with the monetary and financial struggles of running a farm and raising a family, as well as the death and the grieving process. A common theme is that they find that the animals and their companionship, as well as the support of family and friends, can mitigate their problems.

== Production ==
Neues vom Süderhof was written by Marlies Kerremans, and is based on the novels by Hamburg author Brigitte Blobel. This ARD and Norddeutscher Rundfunk (NDR) TV show ran from 1991 to 1997 and had 52 episodes.

The series was originally produced and broadcast by ARD as a 13-episode series in 1991. "Süderhof I" refers to the 13 episodes in the 1991–92 season. After ARD lost the broadcasting rights to Süderhof I, no new episodes were produced. After a break of several years, NDR produced a reboot in 1995. "Süderhof II" refers to the 39 episodes of 1995–1997. Because Brigitte Blobel specified that the children do not age in the books, almost the entire team of actors was recast. Additionally, the spirit of the TV series changed greatly from Suderhof I to Suderhof II.

The main filming locations were a horse farm in Handeloh with many outdoor scenes in the area, the city center of Buchholz (Nordheide) and the Gymnasium in Trittau, but also numerous other places in the southern and eastern parts of Hamburg. Monika Zinnenberg directed all the episodes, and the screenplay was written by Marlies Kerremans based on the literary sources of Brigitte Blobel. The theme music was composed by Rolf Zuckowski, and the background music came from Süderhof I by Michael Reinecke, who provided the German contributions to the Euro Vision Song Contest in 1983 and 1984.

The opening theme song was written and composed by Rolf Zuckowski. "Wir sind die Kinder vom Süderhof" (lit. "We are the children of the Suderhof") has become a very popular standalone song in German culture.

== Cast ==
Because the children in the books never aged, a completely new cast was chosen for Süderhof II, with the exception of Ursula Hinrichs (grandmother Brendel) and some supporting cast members. The new actors were changed with no regard for the looks of the previous. The grandparents' first names were changed by mistake. In the special episode "Visiting the Süderhof", which also aired for the first time in the "Tigerenten Club", the performers of the first two seasons handed over their roles to the new cast members.

In the final season, Bimbo was replaced by a new protagonist named Lili, played by Ann-Kristin Schmeisser. In the fourth episode ("Dany and the dear money") it was announced that Bimbo is in America. The most well-known actress of these later episodes was Sabine Kaack, as mother Sonia Brendel. Before that, she had also starred in the series "Brief secrecy" (ZDF), also directed by Monika Zinnenberg.

| Character | Süderhof I | | Süderhof II | | | |
| Character | Season 1 | Season 2 | Season 3 | Season 4 | Season 5 | Season 6 |
|---|---|---|---|---|---|---|
| Beatrice "Bimbo" Brendel | Singa Gätgens | Singa Gätgens | Friederike Hallerman | Friederike Hallerman | Friederike Hallerman | - |
| Manuela "Molle" Brendel | Pamela Großer | Pamela Großer | Cora Sabrina Grimm | Cora Sabrina Grimm | Cora Sabrina Grimm | Cora Sabrina Grimm |
| Peggy Brendel | Yvonne Jungblut | Yvonne Jungblut | Thea Frank | Thea Frank | Thea Frank | Thea Frank |
| Daniel "Dany" Brendel | Gerrit Hesse | Gerrit Hesse | Philip Huth | Philip Huth | Philip Huth | Philip Huth |
| Benjamin "Ben" Brendel | Niki von der Burg | Niki von der Burg | Tim Küchler | Tim Küchler | Tim Küchler | Tim Küchler |
| Mother Sonia Brendel | Katharina Schütz | Katharina Schütz | Sabine Kaack | Sabine Kaack | Sabine Kaack | Sabine Kaack |
| Father Dr. Günther Brendel | Arnfried Lerche | Arnfried Lerche | Andreas Klein | Andreas Klein | Andreas Klein | Andreas Klein |
| Grandma Brendel | Ursula Hinrichs | Ursula Hinrichs | Ursula Hinrichs | Ursula Hinrichs | Ursula Hinrichs | Ursula Hinrichs |
| Grandpa Brendel | Horst Breiter | Horst Breiter | Heinz Lieven | Heinz Lieven | Heinz Lieven | Heinz Lieven |
| Achim | - | - | Tim Schneider | Tim Schneider | Tim Schneider | Tim Schneider |
| Patrick | - | - | Jonas Reinsch | Jonas Reinsch | Jonas Reinsch | Jonas Reinsch |
| Carolina | - | - | Sophie Steiner | Sophie Steiner | Sophie Steiner | Sophie Steiner |
| Louisa | - | - | Louisa Herfert | Louisa Herfert | Louisa Herfert | Louisa Herfert |
| Lili | - | - | - | Ann-Kristin Schmeisser | Ann-Kristin Schmeisser | Ann-Kristin Schmeisser |

== Süderhof I (1991–1993) ==
The first six episodes of Süderhof were shot in mid-1991. They aired in late 1991 and early 1992, as the leading program of the ARD broadcasting channel. In mid-1992, another 6 episodes were shot (episodes 7–12). All of these episodes premiered in mid- to late 1993. Afterwards, there were broadcast in almost continuous repetition in all ARD-programs, as well as on 3sat and ORF.

=== Season 1 ===
| No. | Title | Original airdate |
|---|---|---|
| 1 | "The hiding place behind the creek" "Das Versteck hinterm Deich" | December 31, 1991 |
Bimbo Brendel meets a mysterious boy living in a tent on the beach. The boy is named a Bastian Broders and he has run away from home. She and Molle have to convince him to go back to his parents. Meanwhile, back on the Suderhof farm, Günther Brendel's brother and sister-in-law are killed, and he adopts their orphaned children, Dany, Peggy, and Benny.
| 2 | "Where is Ben?" "Wo ist Ben?" | January 5, 1992 |
A mysterious new boy has been seen around the Suderhof. At the same time, Ben's pet lamb, Rosi, has gone missing. Without telling anyone, he runs away to find her, and all of the remaining Brendel children have to conduct a search. Meanwhile, Ben and Peggy attend their new school for the first time and meet their new classmates.
| 3 | "The horse race" "Das Pferderennen" | January 12, 1992 |
Bimbo's father wants to sell her beloved pony, Klärchen. Bimbo's only hope of keeping her horse is to win the grand prize of 5000 marks in the city horse race. However, Bilbo becomes jealous when her pony bonds very easily with her cousin Peggy. Later, she reconciled with Peggy and allows Peggy to be her pony's jockey.
| 4 | "Molle won't repeat the year" "Molle darf nicht sitzenbleiben" | January 19, 1992 |
Molle is at the bottom of her English class, and her teacher, Dolly Malhzahn, says that she may have to hold her back a year. Peggy, who is fluent in English, asks her teacher to pass Molle, if she promises to be her personal tutor. Meanwhile, Dolly seems to be spending a lot of time with Günther Brendel, and Sonia Brendel thinks that those two are having an affair.
| 5 | "The nest robber" "Die Nesträuber" | January 26, 1992 |
A group of Texan rodeo cowboys come to visit the Suderhof. Bimbo is convinced to abandon her dream of becoming a vet and now wants to become a cowgirl.
| 6 | "The magic sphere" "Die Zauberkugel" | February 2, 1992 |
A mysterious prophetic boy with a magic sphere visits the Suderhof. Benny schemes to steal the magic sphere, but when he has the magic call, negative events happen.

=== Season 2 ===
| No. | Title | Original airdate |
|---|---|---|
| 7 | "The school thief" "Der Schuldieb" | August 8, 1993 |
| 8 | "The eerie night" "Die unheimliche Nacht" | August 15, 1993 |
| 9 | "The monkey is released" "Die Affen sind los" | August 22, 1993 |
| 10 | "Wanted: a husband for our teacher" "Gesucht: Ein Mann für unsere Lehrerin" | September 12, 1993 |
| 11 | "Kamera läuft" | September 19, 1993 |
| 12 | "Peggy wants to dance" "Peggy will tanzen" | September 26, 1993 |
| 13 | "Danger for the Suderhof" "Gefahr für den Süderhof" | October 3, 1993 |

== Süderhof II (1995–1997) ==
ARD eventually lost the rights to the Süderhof show, and production on episodes stopped. After a four-year hiatus, a different broadcasting company, Norddeutscher Rundfunk, produced more seasons of the series. However, even though the actors in the original Süderhof series were only four years older, they were said to have outgrown the roles because the children in the books never aged. A completely new cast was chosen. All new actors were chosen, except for Ursula Hinrichs (grandmother Brendel), and some supporting cast members.

In 1995, the next season with 13 episodes was shot, which were broadcast in the first half of 1996 in Tigerenten Club. There were 13 episodes in 1997, season 6, the last season of Neues vom Suderhof. The penultimate season with another 13 episodes (episodes 27–39 in the total, 14-26 for Süderhof II) followed in mid-1996, first broadcast was in early 1997. Ilse Werner is seen in a guest role. The final season of the series was filmed in 1997, and premiered in the first half of 1998. This season, Bimbo was replaced by a new protagonist named Lili, played by Ann-Kristin Schmeisser. In the fourth episode ("Dany and the dear money") it was announced that Bimbo is in America.

=== Season 3 ===
| No. in season | Title | Original airdate |
|---|---|---|
| 1 | "Peggy kriegt Zoff" | January 1996 |
| 2 | "Viel Wirbel um ein Foto" | January 6, 1996 |
| 3 | "Ben trampt nach Istanbul" | 1996 |
| 4 | "A visit from the USA" "Besuch aus den USA" | 1996 |
| 5 | "Dany, der rettende Enge" | 1996 |
| 6 | "Angst um Grazia" | 1996 |
| 7 | "The beautiful boy" "Der Wunderknabe" | 1996 |
| 8 | "Schützenfest mit Knalleffekt" | 1996 |
| 9 | "Leuchtfeuer gegen Tierquäler" | 1996 |
| 10 | "Der Mann im Moor" | 1996 |
| 11 | TBA | 1996 |

=== Season 4 ===
| No. in season | Title | Original airdate |
|---|---|---|
| 1 | "Vorhang auf für Molle" | January 1996 |
| 2 | TBA | 1996 |
| 3 | TBA | 1996 |
| 4 | TBA | 1996 |
| 5 | TBA | 1996 |
| 6 | TBA | 1996 |
| 7 | TBA | 1996 |
| 8 | TBA | 1996 |
| 9 | TBA | 1996 |
| 10 | TBA | 1996 |
| 11 | TBA | 1996 |
| 12 | TBA | 1996 |
| 13 | TBA | 1996 |

=== Season 5 ===
| No. in season | Title | Original release date |
|---|---|---|
| 1 | TBA | 1997 |
| 2 | TBA | 1997 |
| 3 | TBA | 1997 |
| 4 | TBA | 1997 |
| 5 | TBA | 1997 |
| 6 | TBA | 1997 |
| 7 | TBA | 1997 |
| 8 | TBA | 1997 |
| 9 | TBA | 1997 |
| 10 | TBA | 1997 |
| 11 | TBA | 1997 |
| 12 | TBA | 1997 |
| 13 | TBA | 1997 |

=== Season 6 ===
| No. in season | Title | Original release date |
|---|---|---|
| 1 | TBA | 1998 |
| 2 | TBA | 1998 |
| 3 | TBA | 1998 |
| 4 | TBA | 1998 |
| 5 | TBA | 1998 |
| 6 | TBA | 1998 |
| 7 | TBA | 1998 |
| 8 | TBA | 1998 |
| 9 | TBA | 1998 |
| 10 | TBA | 1998 |
| 11 | TBA | 1998 |
| 12 | TBA | 1998 |
| 13 | TBA | 1998 |

== Radio play ==
Neues vom Süderhof was adapted into a radio play. The episodes of the audio play were based on the first 13 TV episodes of Süderhof I. The radio play version of News from the Suderhof ranked 12th place in the Children's Bestsellers list in 1998.

== CD-Rom ==
In 1998, there was also a CD-ROM version of Neues vom Süderhof that could run on Windows 95 or 3.1. This game was in the genre of "edutainment," combining both videos of the TV show, behind-the-scenes clips, as well as information on animals, plants, endangered animals, and how to find more information on animal conservation and environmental protection.
