= Großstadtrevier =

- Genre: Crime; Comedy-drama
- Created by: Jürgen Roland
- Starring: Arthur Brauss (1986–1991); Mareike Carrière (1986–1994); Jan Fedder (1992–2020); Maria Ketikidou (since 1994); Saskia Fischer (since 2007); Marc Zwinz; Wanda Perdelwitz (2012–2022); Sven Fricke; Peter Fieseler; Patrick Abozen; Thomas Naumann; Mischa Neutze; Peter Heinrich Brix; Kay Sabben; Edgar Hoppe; Peter Neusser; Till Demtrøder; Christoph Eichhorn; Britta Eichhorn; Andrea Lüdke; Dorothea Schenck; Ann-Cathrin Sudhoff; Matthias Walter; Wilfried Dziallas; Anja Nejarri; Tommaso Cacciapuoti; Sebastian Hölz; Sophie Moser; Steffen Groth; Mads Hjulmand; Jens Münchow; Farina Flebbe
- Opening theme: "Großstadtrevier" by Truck Stop
- Countries of origin: West Germany (1986–1990); Germany (1990–present)
- Original language: German
- No. of seasons: 37
- No. of episodes: 512

Production
- Running time: 48 minutes
- Production company: Studio Hamburg

Original release
- Network: Das Erste
- Release: 16 December 1986 – present

Großstadtrevier (roughly (Big) City Police Station) is a German television series, broadcast on Germany's Das Erste of the ARD. First aired on 16 December 1986, the show is one of the most popular television series in the country. It follows the everyday work of a fictional police station in the Kiez of Hamburg.

== Synopsis ==
The series depicts everyday police work in the Hamburg district of St. Pauli and the neighborhood, focusing on the officers of the fictional 14th Police Station/PK14 (until season 23, the 14th Police Precinct). The plot essentially consists of three sub-areas.

First, there is the area of everyday police work, dealing primarily with minor offenses such as theft, neighborhood disputes, traffic offenses, and family disputes. Here, the often unbureaucratic and interpersonal assistance provided by officers, especially when it comes to elderly citizens, children, and the homeless, is presented as an almost natural part of the job.

Furthermore, there is the area around the neighborhood and Reeperbahn, where the officers primarily deal with prostitution, human trafficking, drugs, and violence, but also address the concerns of the people who live and work there. Real locations such as the drag cabaret Pulverfass and the boxing bar Zur Ritze were also used for this. Dirk Matthies's numerous contacts in the neighborhood often prove helpful when working on the Reeperbahn.

The third section focuses on the private lives of the police officers of PK14 and their interactions at work, true to the motto "One for all, all for one." The cohesion and familial relationship between the officers are particularly emphasized here; this is evident in shared trips to the countryside and after-work beers at their local pub, Big Harry (formerly Elli's). The officers' private activities, which occasionally also become official business, are also frequently featured in the series.

Major crimes such as murder, hostage-taking, and robbery are also occasionally addressed.

== Cast ==
=== Current ===
| Character | Actor | Episodes | Seasons | Years | Rank |
|---|---|---|---|---|---|
| Hariklia "Harry" Möller | Maria Ketikidou | 64-onwards | 8-onwards | 1994-onwards | Police Chief, former Police Master, then Police Sergeant; civilian detective, partner of Nils Sanchez |
| Mrs. Küppers | Saskia Fischer | 244-onwards | 21-onwards | 2007-onwards | Chief Inspector |
| Daniel Schirmer | Sven Fricke | 327-onwards | 26-onwards | 2012-onwards | Police Commissioner |
| Lukas Petersen | Patrick Abozen | 424-onwards | 32-onwards | 2018-onwards | Chief Inspector of Police |
| Helmut Husmann | Torsten Münchow | 460-onwards | 34-onwards | 2021-onwards | Police Chief; Watchman |
| Nils Sanchez | Enrique Fiß | 460-onwards | 34-onwards | 2021-onwards | Civilian detective; partner of Harry Möller, comes from PK 22 |
| Bente Hinrichs | Sinha Melina Gierke | 483-onwards | 35-onwards | 2023-onwards | Chief Police Commissioner, comes from the Schleswig-Holstein police in the district of Dithmarschen |

=== Former ===
| Character | Actor | Episodes | Seasons | Years | Rank |
|---|---|---|---|---|---|
| Dirk Matthies | Jan Fedder | 37–447; 452 | 6–33 | 1992–2020 | Police sergeant; police chief; later police commissioner; then police senior commissioner |
| Nina Sieveking | Wanda Perdelwitz | 327–482 | 26-35 | 2012–2022 | Police sergeant |

== Episodes ==
=== Season 1 (1986-87) ===
| Episode | Title | Original air date |
|---|---|---|
| 1 (1.01) | Mensch, der Bulle ist 'ne Frau (Man, the cop is a woman) | |
| 2 (1.02) | Speedy (Speedy) | |
| 3 (1.03) | Prosit Neujahr (Happy New Year) | |
| 4 (1.04) | Amamos & Consorts (Amamos & Consorts) | |
| 5 (1.05) | Der Champ (The Champ) | |
| 6 (1.06) | Fahrerflucht (Hit and run) | |

== Filming Locations ==
Since Season 33, the interior shots and the entrance of the Commissariat have been filmed in Studio Hamburg Atelier 3 in the Hamburg district of Tonndorf. The outdoor recordings take place in front of the archway Elsässer Straße 20/22 in Dulsberg.

Previously, the district was located in a building in Mendelssohnstraße/Eck Paul-Dessau-Straße, Hamburg-Bahrenfeld. The red brick building, in which the offices of Studio Hamburg Produktion GmbH (which occupied the metropolitan area up to and including the 32nd century) are located outside the shooting times. was used for both indoor and outdoor shots.

In Episodes 1 to 28, the then-real police station 12 (today a branch office of the police station 14), Klingberg 1 in 20095 Hamburg (next to the Chilehaus) was used for the outdoor recordings. The sign with the inscription "Police station 12" was glued accordingly.

Other recurring main shooting locations are the Reeperbahn, Sankt Michaelis, the Sankt-Josefs-Kirche in St. Pauli and the St. Pauli-Landungsbrücken. Some episodes take place outside of Hamburg, so the 300. Episode (airted under episode title 5 after 12 on 10. January 2011) in Bad Segeberg in the scenes of the Freilichttheater am Kalkberg, where the Karl May Games usually take place and was designed as a Western. In addition, three episodes were shot on Gut Rundhof in the Gasthof Weißer Hirsch. The episode Fährmann hol'röver was filmed on the North Sea island Neuwerk, which belongs to the Hamburg-Mitte district.

Another special shooting location was a former firefighting boat called Repsold, which is used for excursion trips on the Lower and Upper Elbe. In the metropolitan area, the Repsold served Dirk Matthies (Jan Fedder) as a houseboat for eight years.

== See also ==
- List of German television series
