= Chapter Two: The Vanishing of Holly Wheeler =

- Stranger Things episode
- Promotional poster by Butcher Billy
- Episode no.: Season 5 Episode 2
- Directed by: The Duffer Brothers
- Written by: The Duffer Brothers
- Cinematography by: Caleb Heymann
- Editing by: Casey Cichocki; Dean Zimmerman
- Original air date: November 26, 2025
- Running time: 57 minutes

Guest appearances
- Sherman Augustus as Sullivan; Alex Breaux as Robert Akers; Joe Chrest as Ted Wheeler; Jake Connelly as Derek Turnbow; Nell Fisher as Holly Wheeler; Emanuel Borria as Sergeant Luis Ramirez

Episode chronology
← Previous "Chapter One: The Crawl"	Next → "Chapter Three: The Turnbow Trap"
- Stranger Things season 5

"Chapter Two: The Vanishing of Holly Wheeler" is the second episode of the fifth season of the American science fiction horror drama television series Stranger Things. The 36th episode overall, the episode was written and directed by series creators The Duffer Brothers, and was released on November 26, 2025, on Netflix as part of volume one of season five.

Set on November 3, 1987, and focuses on the disappearance of Holly Wheeler (Nell Fisher) following an attack on her home by a demogorgon from the Upside Down. The rest of the episode features the fallout from this event and the remaining characters trying to find a way to rescue her and determine why she was targeted in the first place.

The episode received acclaim from critics with praise for the opening scene and the performances (particularly Caleb McLaughlin, Natalia Dyer, Cara Buono, and Nell Fisher).

== Plot ==
As a Demogorgon crashes through Holly's ceiling, she flees to the bathroom where Karen is about to take a bath. Karen tries to reassure Holly, but then notices she is bleeding as the lights begin to flicker. Holly and Karen hide underneath the bathwater as the Demogorgon breaks through the bathroom door. Having noticed the lights as well, Ted enters the Wheeler home, shouting for Holly and Karen. The Demogorgon approaches Ted, who tries to hit it with his golf club, but it throws him through a wall and through Mike's closet. Holly and Karen try to escape the house, but the monster corners them. Karen smashes a wine bottle and begins stabbing the Demogorgon. Having been warned by Will, Eleven and Nancy race to the house, where they find an injured and bloodied Karen. With Holly taken by the Demogorgon, Nancy urges Eleven to pursue them, and Eleven rushes through a nearby portal to the Upside Down.

In the Upside Down, Eleven runs into Hopper while tracking the Demogorgon. He is frustrated with her for putting herself at risk while the military hunts her, but she insists she followed her instincts and believes that finding Holly will lead them to Vecna. She patches up his wound, and Hopper admits that he is afraid of losing her like he lost his daughter. They find a large, impenetrable wall, which Eleven realizes that the Demogorgon has taken Holly through. Neither is able to break through. In Hawkins, Dr. Kay and her soldiers review CCTV footage from the Wheeler house and see Eleven with Nancy, believing her to be connected to the attack.

At Hawkins Memorial Hospital, Mike and Nancy discuss their regrets about not telling their parents the truth sooner. Mike is confused about why Vecna has targeted Holly, but Nancy says it matches a vision he once showed her: their parents and Holly dead. Lucas points out that Holly's abduction is suspiciously close to the anniversary of Will's disappearance. (Note: As depicted in the first season episode "Chapter One: The Vanishing of Will Byers" (2016)) Mike then theorizes that Mr. Whatsit, Holly's imaginary friend, might be real and may know where Holly is. Later, Lucas urges a comatose Max Mayfield to wake up, believing the final battle for Hawkins has begun with Holly's abduction.

Elsewhere in Hawkins, Steve tells Jonathan that they should go to the hospital to support Nancy. The two argue over each other's actions since Jonathan returned from California, with Steve claiming Nancy is unhappy in her relationship, and Jonathan arguing that Steve is constantly competing with him for her attention. Jonathan argues that they should prioritize helping Holly. The two cease arguing when an injured Dustin arrives and is berated by Steve for missing the crawl.

At the WSQK radio station, Will says his previous vision felt as if he were in the Demogorgon's mind. He tells Joyce that he believes he is still connected to the hive mind despite severing his link to the Mind Flayer three years prior. (Note: As depicted in the second season episode "Chapter Nine: The Gate" (2017)) Robin suggests using Will as a human receiver to locate Vecna and find Holly, but Joyce refuses to put Will at risk. They trick Joyce, so they can sneak out and return to the woods where Will had an earlier vision. Robin asks Will if he saw her with Vickie at the hospital, stating that they are good friends whose relationship may confuse some people. Will assures her he saw nothing. Will has a vision at the Hawkins Elementary School playground and realizes that his earlier visions were from Vecna's point of view as he stalked Holly. He believes that he can use the telepathic link to identify Vecna's future targets, the newest being Derek Turnbow. Mike and Nancy sneak into Karen's hospital room, where she reveals that Mr. Whatsit's real name is "Henry," the name of Vecna's human form. In the Mindscape, "Mr. Whatsit"/Henry welcomes Holly into his home, the Creel House.

== Production ==
=== Writing ===
On August 3, 2025, Ross Duffer posted to Instagram, confirming that "Chapter Two: The Vanishing of...", along with episode one "Chapter One: The Crawl", were complete. Regarding the episode (whose full title he declined to reveal), he said it had the "craziest cold open" they had done and one of the sequences they were most proud of. The episode was written and directed by Stranger Things creators The Duffer Brothers. It marked their seventeenth writing credits and their sixteenth directing credits. The episode's title is a reference to "The Vanishing of Will Byers", the series premiere. Nell Fisher, who was cast as Holly Wheeler for the fifth season, expressed that she was "honored" when finding out during the table read that the episode was titled after her character, noting that she met with Anniston and Tinsley Price, the twins who originally played Holly in previous seasons, in preparation for taking over their role. Matt Duffer got the idea to cast Fisher as Holly upon seeing her in the trailer of Evil Dead Rise (2023), showing it to Ross Duffer and asking him if maybe she could be "their Holly" due to reminding him to Max Mayfield actress Sadie Sink when she was younger, with Fisher coincidentally being in the group of girls auditioning for the role that casting director Carmen Cuba gathered for them. Matt Duffer stated that they had wanted to do an attack on the Wheeler residence since the first season.

=== Filming ===
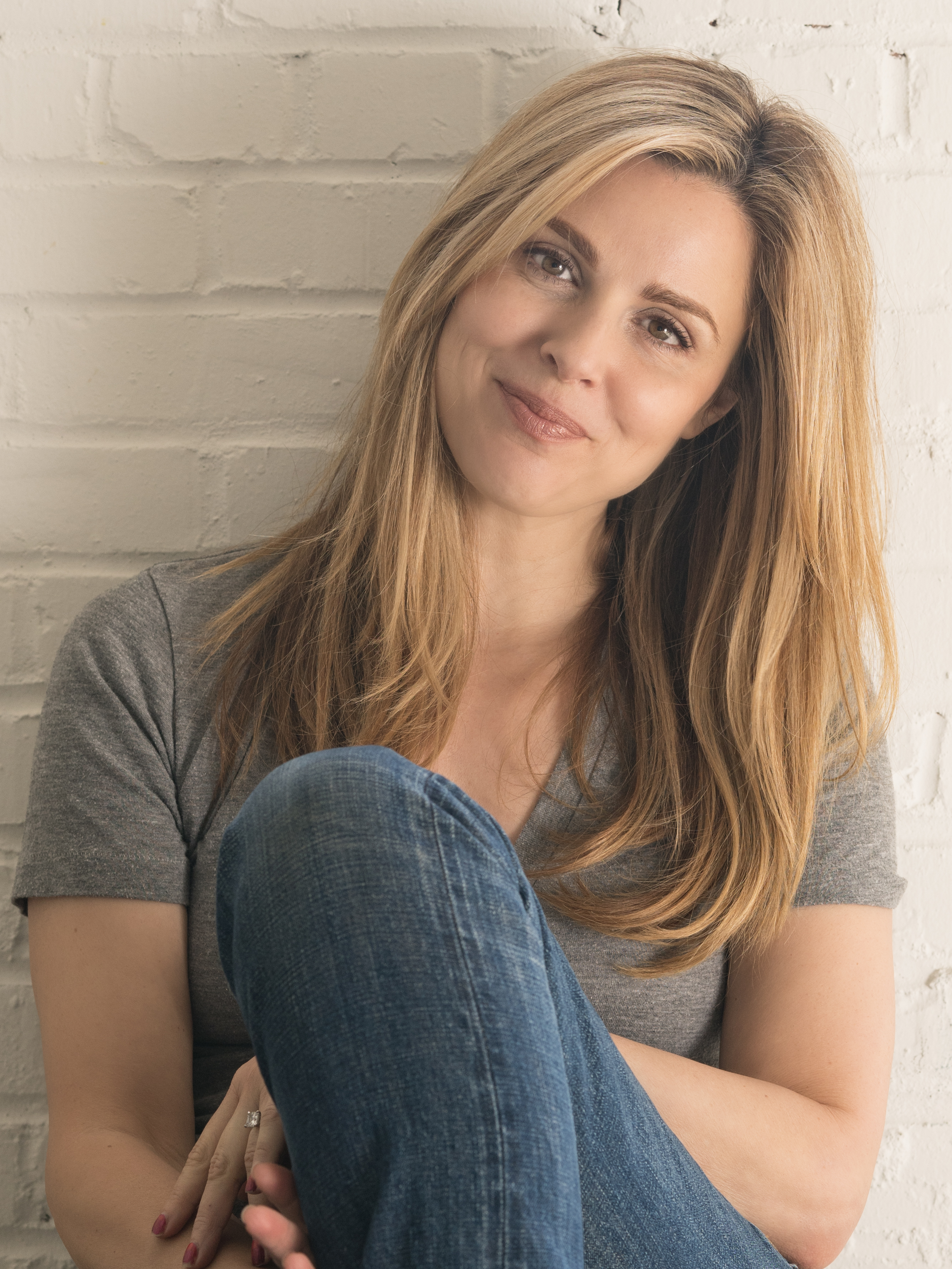
The episode opens with a battle between Karen Wheeler, portrayed by Cara Buono, and a demogorgon.

Cara Buono, who portrays Karen Wheeler, expressed that she was surprised and pleased to learn that she would get a "badass mom" moment in the season, after previously accepting that Karen would remain a "comedic, quintessential, slightly exaggeratedly clueless '80s mom". Buono spoke "at length" with the stunt and costume teams prior to her action scenes, studying the storyboards and previz of the fight to prepare, noting that the Duffers had "a very clear vision of the choreography of it all." She and Fisher spent a day timing how long they could hold their breaths and figuring out the logistics of the bathtub with the crew. The Demogorgon fight was originally meant to be filmed in May, but was moved up to March 2024.

=== Music ===
The episode features "Fernando" by ABBA, "Running Up That Hill" by Kate Bush, and "Mr. Sandman" by The Chordettes. Music supervisor Nora Felder stated that "Fernando", which was used to soundtrack Karen Wheeler's fight with a Demogorgon, was not the original song choice for the opening scenes, but that she felt it became the perfect option once it proved impossible to secure the rights to another song.

In the week following the debut of volume one, almost every song featured on the soundtrack experienced a massive surge in popularity. Billboard reported that "Fernando" more than doubled in streams, with an increasing of 206% to a total of 615,000, that "Mr. Sandman" increase by 173% (to a total of 564,000 streams), and "Running Up That Hill" saw an increase of 110%, to a total of 2.7 million streams, and re-entered the Hot Rock & Alternative Songs chart at number 15. "Running Up That Hill" also returned to the top 40 in Bush's native UK, re-entering the singles chart at number 37.

== Release ==
"The Vanishing of Holly Wheeler" was released on November 26, 2025, on Netflix, alongside the three other episodes comprising Stranger Things season 5 volume 1. The episode's full title was initially listed as just "The Vanishing of..." so as not to spoil the reveal of which character was missing.

== Reception ==
In a positive review, Tara Bennett of IGN felt the episode was an improvement on the season premiere, stating that the Duffers "get their mojo back", and praised the show's return to its horror roots.
