= Chapter One: The Crawl =

- Stranger Things episode
- Promotional poster by Butcher Billy
- Episode no.: Season 5 Episode 1
- Directed by: The Duffer Brothers
- Written by: The Duffer Brothers
- Cinematography by: Caleb Heymann
- Editing by: Casey Cichocki; Dean Zimmerman
- Original air date: November 26, 2025
- Running time: 68 minutes

Guest appearances
- Sherman Augustus as Sullivan; Linnea Berthelsen as Kali / Eight; Alex Breaux as Robert Akers; Joe Chrest as Ted Wheeler; Jake Connelly as Derek Turnbow; Nell Fisher as Holly Wheeler; Hope Hynes Love as Miss Harris; Luke Kokotek as Young Will Byers; Amybeth McNulty as Vickie Dunne; Emanuel Borria as Sergeant Luis Ramirez

Episode chronology
← Previous "Chapter Nine: The Piggyback"	Next → "Chapter Two: The Vanishing of Holly Wheeler"
- Stranger Things season 5

"Chapter One: The Crawl" is the first episode of the fifth season of the American science fiction horror drama television series Stranger Things. The 35th episode overall, the episode was written and directed by series creators The Duffer Brothers, and was released on November 26, 2025, on Netflix alongside the subsequent three episodes as part of volume one of season five.

Set in 1987, 19 months after the events of the previous season, the team continue their search for Vecna, embarking on periodic "crawls" into the Upside Down from Hawkins, which has been quarantined by the US military, in order to find and destroy him.

"The Crawl" received a positive critical reception, with reviewers praising the performances of the cast (particularly Linda Hamilton, Maya Hawke, Joe Keery, and Gaten Matarazzo) but with some criticism towards the amount of exposition.

== Plot ==
In a flashback to November 12, 1983, (Note: Between the events of the first season episodes "Chapter Seven: The Bathtub" and "Chapter Eight: The Upside Down" (2016).) a young Will Byers hides in the Upside Down and is pursued by a Demogorgon. After shooting it, he climbs a tree to escape its grasp, but falls and is knocked unconscious. The Demogorgon takes him to Vecna in the Hawkins Library, who tells Will that his plan can finally begin, and that they will do beautiful things together. He then infects him with a tentacle.

Nearly four years later, on November 3, 1987, the Byers family have moved in with the Wheelers, much to Ted's chagrin. Following the Upside Down's invasion, (Note: As depicted in the fourth season episode "Chapter Nine: The Piggyback" (2022).) Hawkins has been placed under military quarantine, with the local populace having been led to believe that the town suffered a natural phenomenon. Dustin Henderson experiences bullying at school for continuing to wear his Hellfire Club shirt to honor Eddie Munson, while his friends try to get him to keep a low profile. Hiding from the military, Eleven secretly trains her powers with Jim Hopper and Joyce Byers. Robin Buckley and Steve Harrington work at the local radio station, where Robin celebrates the 500th broadcast of her Morning Squawk show. Murray arrives, smuggling various supplies to the group, and reports that the military is planning a large operation in the Upside Down, to which Nancy Wheeler announces it is time for another "crawl" (inspired by dungeon crawls). Robin plays the song "Upside Down" and speaks in code to alert the others that a crawl will happen that night.

During the crawls, Hopper explores the Upside Down one sector at a time, searching for Vecna, while the others track his progress from the real world. Eleven insists on joining Hopper, reasoning that they have done over thirty crawls without issue and that she has grown stronger with her training. He refuses to unnecessarily risk her safety, given the military's search for her. Because Eleven is unable to locate Vecna telepathically and Will has not sensed Vecna's presence, some of the group believe Vecna to be dead, although Nancy and Mike Wheeler argue that they must keep searching until they have proof.

At school, a teacher spots Holly Wheeler speaking to an unseen man, whom she calls "Mr. Whatsit". As the teacher shares her concerns with Karen Wheeler, Holly tells Mike that Mr. Whatsit has warned her of monsters in Hawkins. At the military base within the Upside Down, Dr. Kay oversees experiments on a Demogorgon and various other beings. She tells her operative, Sergeant Ramirez, that they must find Eleven. Meanwhile, Will and Lucas Sinclair visit Max Mayfield in the hospital, and Lucas plays her song in the hope she will wake up from her coma. Will accidentally sees Robin kissing Vickie, whom she has secretly begun dating, and abruptly runs off.

Dustin visits Eddie's grave, which has been vandalized with the blood of a corn snake he used as a prank; his provoked bullies arrive and assault him. They left him bloody and unresponsive to his friends. Due to this, Dustin misses the crawl so the group needs another volunteer to accompany Steve in tracking Hopper. Though Will volunteers, Joyce asks Jonathan Byers to go instead, despite their friction over Jonathan's relationship with Nancy. Hopper travels through secret tunnels under Hawkins, sneaks into the military base, and hijack an army truck just before it drives through a portal into the Upside Down. However, the operation goes south as a Demogorgon attacks the convoy and kills the soldiers; Hopper is wounded in the attack but manages to escape into the woods. Will witnesses the attack from the Demogorgon's point of view and, overwhelmed, collapses.

Hearing her parents argue about her well-being, an upset Holly retreats upstairs. Karen, drinking heavily, decides to run a bath while Ted plays golf outside. Will wakes up and warns the group that something is heading for the Wheeler home. Eleven and Nancy race there, with Mike and Lucas rushing on their bikes. In her room, Holly sees a crack forming on her ceiling, and a Demogorgon bursts through from the Upside Down.

== Production ==
On August 3, 2025, Ross Duffer posted to Instagram, confirming that "Chapter One: The Crawl", along with the second episode, "Chapter Two: The Vanishing of Holly Wheeler", were complete. Regarding the episode, he said it was his favorite and one of the most eventful.

=== Writing ===
The episode was written and directed by Stranger Things creators The Duffer Brothers. It marked their seventeenth writing credits and their sixteenth directing credits. Speaking of the season premiere, Ross Duffer stated, "we usually set up their normal life and how they're going about school, and then we introduce the supernatural element, but in this case, this season is sprinting from the start".

Starting from this episode, Henry Creel / Vecna poses as "Mr. Whatsit" from Madeleine L'Engle's novel A Wrinkle in Time (1962) to trick Holly Wheeler and her classmates to follow him by claiming that there are monsters near them as they have been reading the book, which the Duffers felt inspired to choose because it was a staple of their childhood when they were around that age which impacted them, so they picked it because they assumed it would be a book Holly would be reading at school plus the story had some parallels to Holly's own. Early scripts had Vecna impersonate the Conductor of Chris Van Allsburg's picture book The Polar Express (1985) instead and had him take the kids aboard a train to the "North Pole", but they realized the book was a "little too young" despite that the idea could have worked, preferring "Mr. Whatsit" as it sounded creepier.

=== Filming ===
For the opening scenes, the flashback to a young Will Byers trapped in the Upside Down, eleven year-old actor Luke Kokotek was cast to play the character, with Noah Schnapp's face applied onto Kokotek's by Wētā FX. This combination of a younger body double and VFX was previously used by Stranger Things in season four with Millie Bobby Brown and her character Eleven, with Martie Blair serving as her body double. Schnapp stated that he approached Brown for advice around how to work with the younger actor, expressing that he enjoyed the chance to "step into those director shoes".

=== Music ===
The episode features "Rockin' Robin" by Michael Jackson, "Pretty in Pink" by The Psychedelic Furs, "Upside Down" by Diana Ross, and "Running Up That Hill" by Kate Bush.

In the week following the debut of volume one, almost every song featured on the soundtrack experienced a massive surge in popularity. Billboard reported that "Upside Down" experienced the biggest gain, more than tripling its streams and exhibiting an increase of 373% to a total of 953,000 streams. Similarly, "Rockin' Robin" more than doubled in streams, with an increase of 218% to a total of 187,000 streams, and "Running Up That Hill" saw an increase of 110%, to a total of 2.7 million streams, and re-entered the Hot Rock & Alternative Songs chart at number 15. "Running Up That Hill" also returned to the top 40 in Bush's native UK, re-entering the singles chart at number 37.

== Release ==
The first five minutes of the episode, featuring young Will in the Upside Down, were shown as a "sneak peak" of season five on November 7, 2025, during a virtual Tudum fan event. The episode was exclusively for fans on November 13 at Leicester Square, two weeks prior to the official release. "The Crawl" was released on November 26, 2025, on Netflix, alongside the three subsequent episodes comprising Stranger Things season 5 volume 1.

== Reception ==
The episode received a positive reception from critics. Writing for Winter Is Coming, Natalie Zamora gave the episode an "A" grade. She praised the continued impact of Eddie Munson's death through Dustin Henderson's character, and spoke positively of Linda Hamilton's performance as new villain Dr. Kay, and the debut of Nell Fisher as Holly Wheeler. In a more mixed review, Tara Bennett of IGN called the episode the "least graceful" of the volume, criticizing the "overwhelming" amount of information and certain character dynamics. Writing for Polygon, Samantha Nelson appreciated the cohesion of the storylines in the episode, and referred to the banter between Steve Harrington, Dustin, and Robin Buckley as a "highlight". In a five star review of the first volume, Sabrina Burr of Metro also praised Matarazzo's performance. Reception to the visual effects used in the episode's opening scene received a mix response from fans.
