= Chapter One: The Vanishing of Will Byers =

- Stranger Things episode
- Promotional poster by Butcher Billy
- Episode no.: Season 1 Episode 1
- Directed by: The Duffer Brothers
- Written by: The Duffer Brothers
- Cinematography by: Tim Ives
- Editing by: Dean Zimmerman
- Original release date: July 15, 2016
- Running time: 49 minutes

Episode chronology
← Previous —	Next → "Chapter Two: The Weirdo on Maple Street"
- Stranger Things season 1

"Chapter One: The Vanishing of Will Byers" is the series premiere of the American science fiction horror television series Stranger Things. Written and directed by series' creators The Duffer Brothers, the episode was released alongside the rest of the first season on July 15, 2016, on Netflix.

== Plot ==
In a lab on the outskirts of the fictional town Hawkins, Indiana on November 6, 1983, a scientist is seen attempting to escape from an unseen monster. He makes it to an elevator but is attacked and killed by the creature.

After a ten-hour Dungeons & Dragons session with his best friends Mike Wheeler, Lucas Sinclair and Dustin Henderson, young Will Byers rides home near the woods he and his friends nicknamed Mirkwood. Will is startled by the silhouette of a humanoid in the road ahead of him and crashes his bike. He runs through Mirkwood toward his house, while the creature follows him. Will takes shelter in his family's shed behind the house and arms himself with a rifle. However, as the lightbulb in the shed starts to burn brightly, something appears behind Will, who looks on in horror and a moment later vanishes without a trace.

When Will's mother Joyce and brother Jonathan realize he's missing the next morning, Joyce goes to the Chief of Police Jim Hopper, a former classmate of hers from high school. Hopper tells her Will has likely run away, perhaps to his absent father, Lonnie. Joyce rebuffs him, believing something sinister has happened, and Hopper begins to search for Will.

Meanwhile, a girl with a shaved head ventures out of the same woods and into a local restaurant, where she steals French fries from the owner, Benny Hammond. He chases her until he realizes she is in trouble and gives her food, as well as calling social services. She doesn't want to speak, but Benny spots the "011" tattoo on her arm and she points that "Eleven" is herself. When the supposed social service agents arrive, one of them shoots Benny, and Eleven realizes that these people are from the lab. Eleven escapes leaving two agents on the ground. She runs back into the woods, where she encounters Mike, Dustin, and Lucas, who had set out to search for Will on their own.

== Cast and characters ==
- Winona Ryder as Joyce Byers
- David Harbour as Jim Hopper
- Finn Wolfhard as Mike Wheeler
- Millie Bobby Brown as Eleven
- Gaten Matarazzo as Dustin Henderson
- Caleb McLaughlin as Lucas Sinclair
- Natalia Dyer as Nancy Wheeler
- Charlie Heaton as Jonathan Byers
- Cara Buono as Karen Wheeler
- Matthew Modine as Martin Brenner
- Joe Chrest as Ted Wheeler
- Joe Keery as Steve Harrington
- Rob Morgan as Officer Powell
- Ross Partridge as Lonnie Byers
- Shannon Purser as Barbara Holland
- John Paul Reynolds as Officer Callahan
- Noah Schnapp as Will Byers
- Mark Steger as The Monster
- Chris Sullivan as Benny Hammond

== Production ==
The episode was originally titled "Montauk Pilot" and was the first episode from Montauk, the original title for Stranger Things. It was later renamed along with the show, though the script itself barely changed. The episode was written and directed by the show's creators, the Duffer Brothers. "The Vanishing of Will Byers" was released on July 15, 2016, on Netflix.

== Reception ==
=== Critical response ===
The episode was well received by critics, Collider calling it "one of the most intriguing pilots to have ever been seen on television". PopMatters noted that the show "captures fear and the '80s so brilliantly, you'd think Netflix injected it with some mad scientist-created serum to ensure maximum binge-worthiness." André Borrego praised the lighting and use of shadows and found the episode very promising. A recap of the episode in Canyon News noted, "Not only does this TV show have 80s style horror, it has 80s style romance!" A very positive review for The A.V. Club found that "Keys are the key to "Chapter One," and maybe to all of Stranger Things' nostalgia-laden mixture of freedom and danger."

=== Accolades ===
The Duffer Brothers were nominated for the Primetime Emmy Awards for outstanding writing and outstanding directing for the episode, as well as the Directors Guild of America Outstanding Directorial Achievement for a Drama Series award for "The Vanishing of Will Byers" as well. Others were awarded accolades for their work in the episode as well.
