= Stranger Things season 1 =

Season of television series

Stranger Things
- Season 1
- Promotional poster
- Showrunners: Karl Gajdusek; Matt Duffer Ross Duffer
- Starring: Winona Ryder; David Harbour; Finn Wolfhard; Millie Bobby Brown; Gaten Matarazzo; Caleb McLaughlin; Natalia Dyer; Charlie Heaton; Cara Buono; Matthew Modine
- No. of episodes: 8

Release
- Original network: Netflix
- Original release: July 15, 2016

Season chronology
- Next → Season 2

The first season of the American science fiction horror drama television series Stranger Things premiered worldwide on the streaming service Netflix on July 15, 2016. The series was created by the Duffer Brothers, who serve as showrunners alongside Karl Gajdusek. (Note: Gajdusek is credited as a "co-showrunner") All three also served as executive producers along with Dan Cohen and Shawn Levy. The principal cast includes Winona Ryder, David Harbour, Finn Wolfhard, Millie Bobby Brown, Gaten Matarazzo, Caleb McLaughlin, Natalia Dyer, Charlie Heaton, Cara Buono, and Matthew Modine, while the recurring cast includes Joe Keery, Noah Schnapp, and Shannon Purser.

Set in the 1980s, Stranger Things follows the supernatural adventures of the residents of the fictional Indiana town of Hawkins. The first season, set in 1983, revolves around the citizens' search for the missing Will Byers (Schnapp), during which they inadvertently discover the supernatural forces present in the town. In the process, the citizens become entangled in a series of events involving the local laboratory, an apparent parallel dimension known as the Upside Down, and a human test subject possessing superpowers named Eleven (Brown).

The season was produced by Levy's 21 Laps Entertainment and the Duffer Brothers' Monkey Massacre Productions. Filming began on September 25, 2015, and concluded in early 2016, with principal photography taking place in Atlanta, Georgia. Several episodes featured writing by Jessica Mecklenburg, Justin Doble, Alison Tatlock, Jessie Nickson-Lopez, and Paul Ditcher. Two soundtrack albums were released in August, and the home video sets arrived in late 2017 for Region 1. The season received critical acclaim for its direction, performances (particularly those of Ryder and Brown) and soundtrack. It also received several accolades and awards nominations, most notably for its cast.

== Premise ==
In November 1983, in the fictional town of Hawkins, Indiana, 12-year-old Will Byers goes missing. His disappearance is noticed by his hardworking mother Joyce and his antisocial older brother Jonathan, sparking a town-wide search led by police chief Jim Hopper. Meanwhile, a human test subject from the nearby Hawkins Laboratory—a girl with psychokinetic and telepathic abilities known as "Eleven" based on her numerical designation—escapes the laboratory. Will's friends, Mike Wheeler, Lucas Sinclair, and Dustin Henderson, shelter her in the hope she can help find Will. Joyce experiences a series of supernatural encounters involving Will, who is trapped in a parallel dimension known as the Upside Down, an apparent alternate reality that is the subject of experiments at the laboratory. Mike's sister, Nancy, who is dating popular student Steve Harrington, turns to Jonathan for help after her childhood friend Barbara Holland mysteriously vanishes as well. Hopper investigates conspiracy theories surrounding Hawkins. These ultimately lead to the townspeople discovering the supernatural forces at work in Hawkins and an attempt to rescue Will from the Upside Down.

== Cast and characters ==
=== Main cast ===
- Winona Ryder as Joyce Byers
- David Harbour as Jim Hopper
- Finn Wolfhard as Mike Wheeler
- Millie Bobby Brown as Eleven
- Gaten Matarazzo as Dustin Henderson
- Caleb McLaughlin as Lucas Sinclair
- Natalia Dyer as Nancy Wheeler
- Charlie Heaton as Jonathan Byers
- Cara Buono as Karen Wheeler
- Matthew Modine as Martin Brenner

=== Recurring ===
- Noah Schnapp as Will Byers
- Joe Keery as Steve Harrington
- Shannon Purser as Barbara "Barb" Holland
- Joe Chrest as Ted Wheeler
- Ross Partridge as Lonnie Byers
- Rob Morgan as Officer Powell
- John Paul Reynolds as Officer Callahan
- Randy Havens as Scott Clarke
- Catherine Dyer as Connie Frazier
- Aimee Mullins as Terry Ives
- Amy Seimetz as Becky Ives
- Peyton Wich as Troy
- Tony Vaughn as Principal Coleman
- Charles Lawlor as Mr. Melvald
- Tinsley and Anniston Price as Holly Wheeler
- Cade Jones as James
- Chester Rushing as Tommy H.
- Chelsea Talmadge as Carol
- Glennellen Anderson as Nicole
- Cynthia Barrett as Marsha Holland
- Jerri Tubbs as Diane Hopper
- Elle Graham as Sara Hopper
- Chris Sullivan as Benny Hammond
- Tobias Jelinek as lead agent
- Robert Walker-Branchaud as repairman agent
- Susan Shalhoub Larkin as Florence ("Flo")

== Episodes ==
| No. overall | No. in season | Title | Directed by | Written by | Original release date |
|---|---|---|---|---|---|
| 1 | 1 | "Chapter One: The Vanishing of Will Byers" | The Duffer Brothers | The Duffer Brothers | July 15, 2016 |
On November 6, 1983, in Hawkins, Indiana, a scientist is attacked by an unseen creature at a U.S. government laboratory. 12-year-old Will Byers encounters the creature and mysteriously vanishes while cycling home from a Dungeons & Dragons session with his friends Mike Wheeler, Dustin Henderson and Lucas Sinclair. The following day, Will's single mother Joyce Byers reports his disappearance to the police chief Jim Hopper, who launches a town-wide search. The lab's director, Dr. Martin Brenner, investigates an organic substance oozing from the lab's basement, claiming that "the girl" cannot have gone far. "The Girl", wearing a hospital gown, wanders into a local diner. The owner, Benny, finds a tattoo of "011" on her arm and learns that her name is Eleven. Brenner, monitoring the phone lines, sends agents to the diner after Benny calls social services. The agents kill Benny, but Eleven manages to escape using telekinetic abilities. Joyce's phone short circuits after receiving a mysterious phone call that she believes is from Will. While searching for Will in the woods, Mike, Dustin, and Lucas come across Eleven.
| 2 | 2 | "Chapter Two: The Weirdo on Maple Street" | The Duffer Brothers | The Duffer Brothers | July 15, 2016 |
The boys bring Eleven to Mike's house, where they disagree on what to do. Mike formulates a plan for Eleven to pretend to be a runaway and seek help from his mother, Karen. Eleven refuses, however, revealing that "bad men" are after her. Will's brother Jonathan visits his estranged father Lonnie in Indianapolis to search for Will, but Lonnie rebuffs him. Hopper's search party discovers a scrap of hospital gown near the lab. After recognizing Will in a photograph and demonstrating her telekinesis, Eleven convinces the boys to trust her, as they believe she can find Will. Using the Dungeons & Dragons board, Eleven indicates that Will is on the "Upside Down" side of the board and is being hunted by the "Demogorgon" (the creature). Mike's sister Nancy and her friend Barbara 'Barb' Holland go to a party with Nancy's boyfriend Steve Harrington. Searching for Will near Steve's house, Jonathan secretly photographs the party. Joyce receives another call from Will, hears music playing from his stereo, and sees a creature coming through the wall. Left alone by the swimming pool, Barb is attacked by the Demogorgon and vanishes.
| 3 | 3 | "Chapter Three: Holly, Jolly" | Shawn Levy | Jessica Mecklenburg | July 15, 2016 |
Barb awakens in the Upside Down, a decaying, overgrown alternate dimension. She attempts to escape but is attacked by the Demogorgon. Joyce believes Will is communicating through pulses in light bulbs. Hopper visits Hawkins Lab, and the staff permits him to view doctored security footage from the night Will vanished, leading Hopper to investigate Brenner and discover his involvement with Project MKUltra and that a woman named Terry Ives alleged years earlier that Brenner took her daughter. Eleven recalls Brenner, whom she calls "Papa," punishing her for refusing to hurt a cat telekinetically. Steve destroys Jonathan's camera after discovering the photos from the party. Nancy later recovers a photo of Barb, simultaneously realizing that Barb is missing. Returning to Steve's house to investigate, Nancy finds Barb's untouched Volkswagen and encounters the Demogorgon but manages to escape. Joyce paints an alphabetic board on her wall with Christmas lights, allowing Will to sign to her that he is "RIGHT HERE" and that she needs to "RUN" as the Demogorgon comes through the wall. Believing Eleven knows where Will is, the boys ask her to lead them to him. Eleven leads them, to their frustration, to Will's house. From there, they follow emergency vehicles to a nearby quarry just as Will's body is recovered from the water.
| 4 | 4 | "Chapter Four: The Body" | Shawn Levy | Justin Doble | July 15, 2016 |
Joyce refuses to believe that the body found at the quarry is Will's. Mike feels betrayed by Eleven until she proves that Will is still alive, channeling his voice through Mike's walkie-talkie. The boys theorize that Eleven could use a ham radio at their school to communicate with Will. Nancy notices a figure behind Barb in Jonathan's photo, which Jonathan realizes matches his mother's description of the Demogorgon. Nancy tells the police about Barb's disappearance. She later fights with Steve, who not only does not care about Barb but only cares about not getting in trouble with his father. Hopper has suspicions regarding the authenticity of the body found in the quarry when he learns that the usual coroner was sent home. Hopper confronts the state trooper who found it and beats him until he admits he was ordered to lie. The boys sneak Eleven into their school to use the radio, while Joyce hears Will's voice through her living room wall. Tearing away the wallpaper, she sees him. Eleven uses the radio to channel Will talking to his mother. Hopper goes to the morgue and finds that the body is a fake, and, suspecting that Brenner is responsible, breaks into the lab.
| 5 | 5 | "Chapter Five: The Flea and the Acrobat" | The Duffer Brothers | Alison Tatlock | July 15, 2016 |
Hopper searches the lab before being knocked out by the lab's guards. The boys ask their science teacher, Mr. Clarke, if it would be possible to travel between alternate dimensions, to which he answers that there could be a theoretical "gate" between dimensions. Hopper awakens at his house and finds a hidden microphone, realizing that Joyce was right the whole time. The boys follow their compasses, searching for a gate that could disrupt the Earth's electromagnetic field. Eleven recalls memories of being placed in a sensory-deprivation tank to telepathically eavesdrop on a Soviet man speaking Russian; while listening, she accidentally came across the Demogorgon. Fearing another encounter with the Demogorgon, Eleven redirects the compasses. Lucas misinterprets this as an act of betrayal, leading Mike and Lucas to fight and Eleven to telekinetically fling Lucas away from Mike. While Dustin and Mike tend to the unconscious Lucas, Eleven runs off. Nancy and Jonathan formulate a plan to kill the Demogorgon. While searching in the woods, they come across a small gate to the Upside Down. Nancy crawls through it but inadvertently draws the Demogorgon's attention. Jonathan unsuccessfully tries to look for Nancy, as the gate to the Upside Down begins to close.
| 6 | 6 | "Chapter Six: The Monster" | The Duffer Brothers | Jessie Nickson-Lopez | July 15, 2016 |
After finding the small gate, Jonathan pulls Nancy back through it. That night, Nancy is afraid to be alone and asks Jonathan to stay in her bedroom. Steve, attempting to reconcile with Nancy, sees them together through her bedroom window and assumes they are in a relationship. Joyce and Hopper track down Terry Ives, who is catatonic and tended by her sister Becky. Becky explains that Terry was a Project MKUltra participant while unknowingly pregnant and that Terry believes Brenner kidnapped her daughter Jane at birth due to her supposed telekinetic and telepathic abilities. Nancy and Jonathan stockpile weapons to kill the Demogorgon, theorizing that it is attracted by blood. Steve is brutally beaten up in a fistfight with Jonathan after he insults Will and calls Nancy a slut. Jonathan is arrested and held at the police station for beating up Steve and inadvertently punching one of the responding officers in the face while Steve's group flees. Eleven walks into a grocery store and shoplifts several boxes of Eggo waffles. Searching for Eleven, Mike and Dustin are ambushed by two bullies, Troy and James, who try to kill Mike. Mike is rescued by Eleven, who uses her powers to break Troy's arm. Eleven collapses and recalls being asked by Brenner to contact the Demogorgon and, in her terror, inadvertently opening the gate. She tearfully admits to Mike and Dustin that she is responsible for allowing the Demogorgon to enter this dimension. Lucas sees agents, who have tracked down Eleven, preparing to ambush Mike's house.
| 7 | 7 | "Chapter Seven: The Bathtub" | The Duffer Brothers | Justin Doble | July 15, 2016 |
Lucas warns Mike that agents are searching for Eleven. Mike, Dustin, and Eleven flee the house while Brenner and his agents chase the kids using vans. Eleven telekinetically flips one of the vans that block their path as the kids escape. Lucas reconciles with Mike and Eleven, and the kids hide in the junkyard. Nancy and Jonathan reveal their knowledge of the Demogorgon to Joyce and Hopper. Hopper learns from Troy that Eleven is with the kids. The kids, teens, and adults all meet at the Byers' house, where Joyce and Hopper realize that Eleven is Jane Ives. The group asks Eleven to search for Will and Barb telepathically, but her earlier feats have weakened her. They break into the middle school and build a makeshift sensory deprivation tank to amplify Eleven's powers. After telepathically entering the Upside Down again, Eleven finds Barb dead and Will alive, hiding in the Upside Down version of his backyard fort. Realizing that the gate is in the basement of the lab, Hopper and Joyce break into the lab and are apprehended by security guards. Nancy and Jonathan sneak into the police station to retrieve the weapons they purchased previously, planning to lure and kill the Demogorgon. In the Upside Down, the Demogorgon breaks into Will's fort.
| 8 | 8 | "Chapter Eight: The Upside Down" | The Duffer Brothers | Story by : Paul Dichter; Teleplay by : The Duffer Brothers | July 15, 2016 |
Hopper, haunted by the death of his daughter Sara from cancer years earlier, gives up Eleven's location to Brenner, who in exchange allows Hopper and Joyce to enter the Upside Down to rescue Will. Nancy and Jonathan cut their hands to attract the Demogorgon at the Byers' house. Steve, intending to apologize to Jonathan about their fight, arrives just as the Demogorgon appears. Steve, Nancy, and Jonathan fight the Demogorgon and light it on fire, forcing it to retreat back into the Upside Down. Meanwhile, Eleven and the boys hide in the middle school when Brenner and his agents arrive to kidnap Eleven; she kills most of them before collapsing from exhaustion. As Brenner and his remaining agents pin Eleven and the boys down, the Demogorgon appears, attracted by the dead agents' blood, and attacks Brenner and the remaining agents as the boys escape with Eleven. Hopper and Joyce enter the Upside Down's version of the Hawkins library, where they encounter several corpses of the Demogorgon's victims, including Barb, and find Will unconscious with a tendril down his throat. Hopper revives him using CPR after removing the tendril. The Demogorgon corners the kids, but Eleven recovers from her exhaustion and disintegrates it, causing them both to disappear. Will recovers in the hospital, reuniting with his family and friends. One month later, it is Christmas and Nancy is back together with Steve, and both are friends with Jonathan. Will coughs up a slug-like creature and has a vision of the Upside Down, but hides this from his family.

== Production ==
=== Development ===
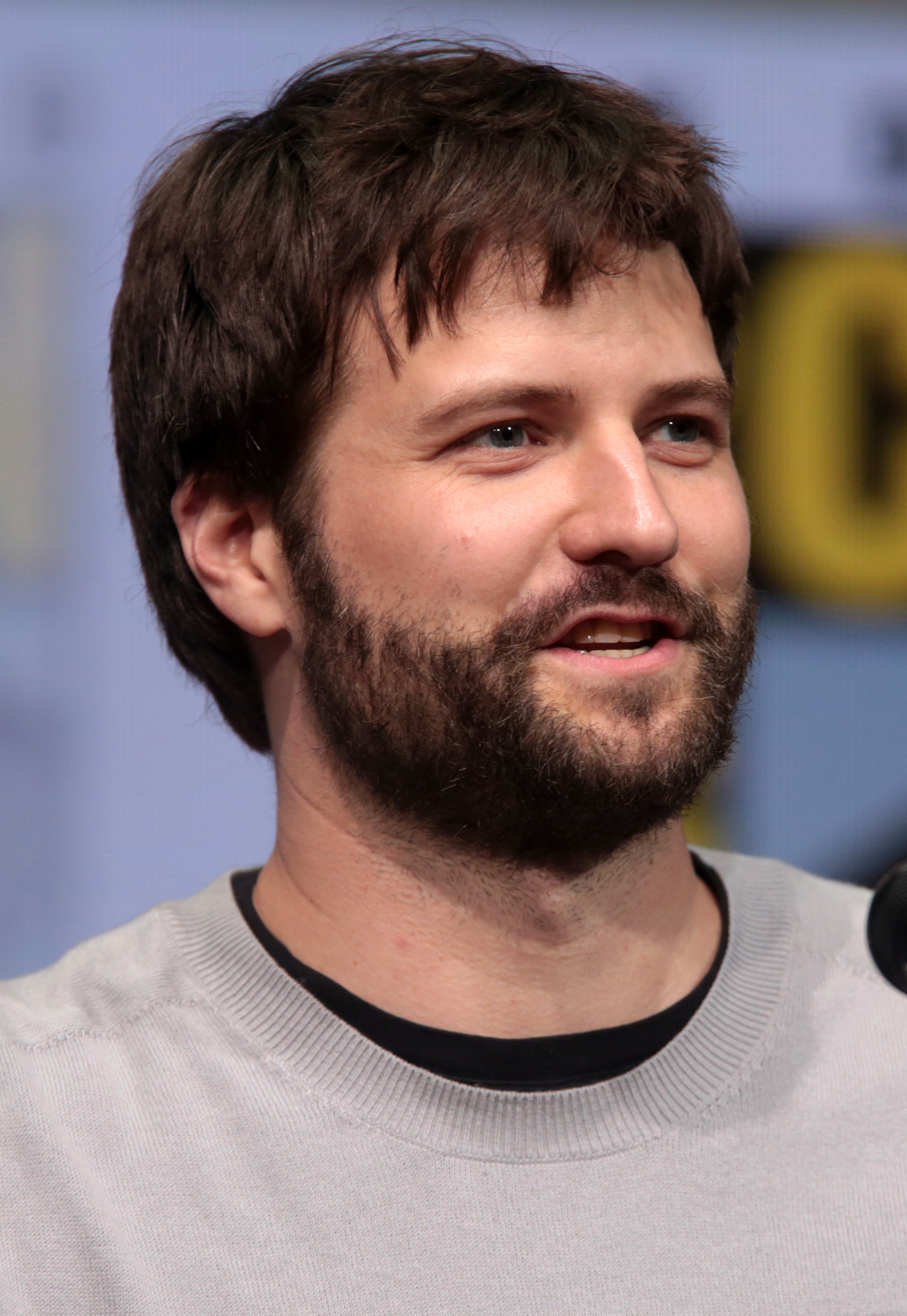
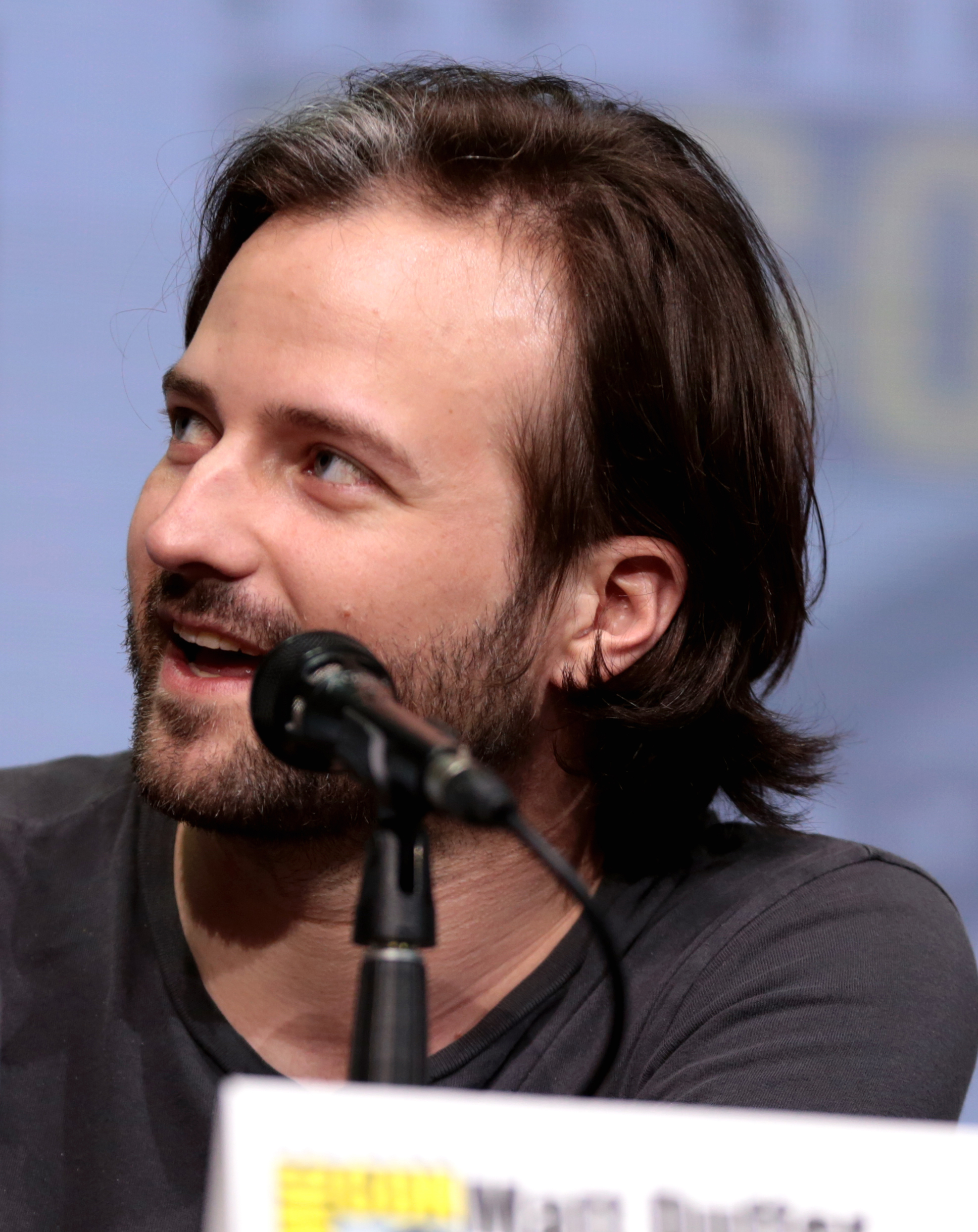
Ross (left) and Matt Duffer, the creators of the series

Stranger Things was created by Matt and Ross Duffer, known professionally as the Duffer Brothers. They had completed writing and producing their 2015 film Hidden, which they had tried to emulate the style of M. Night Shyamalan, however, due to changes at Warner Bros., its distributor, the film did not see a wide release and the Duffers were unsure of their future. To their surprise, television producer Donald De Line approached them, impressed with Hidden's script, and offered them the opportunity to work on episodes of Wayward Pines alongside Shyamalan. The brothers were mentored by Shyamalan during the episode's production so that when they finished, they felt they were ready to produce their own television series.

The Duffer Brothers prepared a script that would essentially be similar to the series' actual pilot episode, along with a 20-page pitch book to help shop the series around for a network. They pitched the story to a number of cable networks, all of which rejected the script on the basis that they felt a plot centered around children as leading characters would not work, asking them to make it a children's show or to drop the children and focus on Hopper's investigation in the paranormal. In early 2015, Dan Cohen, the VP of 21 Laps Entertainment, brought the script to his colleague Shawn Levy. They subsequently invited The Duffer Brothers to their office and purchased the rights for the series, giving full authorship of it to the brothers. After reading the pilot, the streaming service Netflix purchased the whole season for an undisclosed amount; the show was subsequently announced for a planned 2016 release by Netflix in early April 2015. The Duffer Brothers stated that at the time they had pitched to Netflix, the service had already been recognized for its original programming, such as House of Cards and Orange Is the New Black, with well-recognized producers behind them, and were ready to start giving upcoming producers like them a chance. The brothers started to write out the series and brought Levy and Cohen in as executive producers to start casting and filming. Karl Gajdusek served as a showrunner alongside Duffer Brother and executive producer for the first season.

The series was originally known as Montauk, as the setting of the script was in Montauk, New York and nearby Long Beach locations. The brothers had chosen Montauk as it had further Spielberg ties with the film Jaws, where Montauk was used for the fictional setting of Amity Island. After deciding to change the narrative of the series to take place in the fictional town of Hawkins instead, the brothers felt they could now do things to the town, such as placing it under quarantine, that they really could not envision with a real location. With the change in location, they had to come up with a new title for the series under the direction from Netflix's Ted Sarandos so that they could start marketing it to the public. The brothers started by using a copy of Stephen King's Firestarter novel to consider the title's font and appearance and came up with a long list of potential alternatives. Stranger Things came about as it sounded similar to another King novel, Needful Things, though Matt noted they still had a "lot of heated arguments" over this final title.

=== Writing ===
The idea of Stranger Things started with how the brothers felt they could take the concept of the 2013 film Prisoners, detailing the moral struggles a father goes through when his daughter is kidnapped, and expand it out over eight or so hours in a serialized television approach. As they focused on the missing child aspect of the story, they wanted to introduce the idea of "childlike sensibilities" they could offer and toyed around with the idea of a monster that could consume humans. The brothers thought the combination of these things "was the best thing ever". To introduce this monster into the narrative, they considered "bizarre experiments we had read about taking place in the Cold War" such as Project MKUltra, which gave a way to ground the monster's existence in science rather than something spiritual. This also helped them to decide on using 1983 as the time period, as it was a year before the film Red Dawn came out, which focused on Cold War paranoia. Subsequently, they were able to use all their own personal inspirations from the 1980s, the decade they were born, as elements of the series, crafting it in the realm of science fiction and horror. The Duffer Brothers have cited as influence for the show (among others): Stephen King novels; films produced by Steven Spielberg, John Carpenter, Wes Craven, Robert Zemeckis, George Lucas and Guillermo del Toro; films such as Alien and Stand by Me; Japanese anime such as Akira and Elfen Lied; and video games such as Silent Hill and The Last of Us.

With Netflix as the platform, The Duffer Brothers were not limited to a typical 22-episode format, opting for the eight-episode approach. They had been concerned that a 22-episode season on broadcast television would be difficult to "tell a cinematic story" with that many episodes. Eight episodes allowed them to give time to characterization in addition to narrative development; if they had less time available, they would have had to remain committed to telling a horror film as soon as the monster was introduced and abandon the characterization. Within the eight episodes, the brothers aimed to make the first season "feel like a big movie" with all the major plot lines completed so that "the audience feels satisfied", but left enough unresolved to indicate "there's a bigger mythology, and there's a lot of dangling threads at the end", something that could be explored in further seasons if Netflix opted to create more. The Duffers intentionally left the show's mythology vague in the season finale. When Netflix asked for an internal explanation, the writers' room developed a 20-page document about the show's universe, much of which would not be seen onscreen until the final season.

Regarding writing for the children characters of the series, The Duffer Brothers considered themselves as outcasts from other students while in high school and thus found it easy to write for Mike Wheeler and his friends, and particularly for Barbara "Barb" Holland. Joyce Byers was fashioned after Richard Dreyfuss's character Roy Neary in Close Encounters of the Third Kind, as she appears "absolutely bonkers" to everyone else as she tries to find her son Will Byers. Other characters, such as Billy in the second season, have more villainous attributes that are not necessarily obvious from the onset; Matt explained that they took further inspiration from Stephen King for these characters, as King "always has really great human villains" that may be more malicious than the supernatural evil.

=== Casting ===
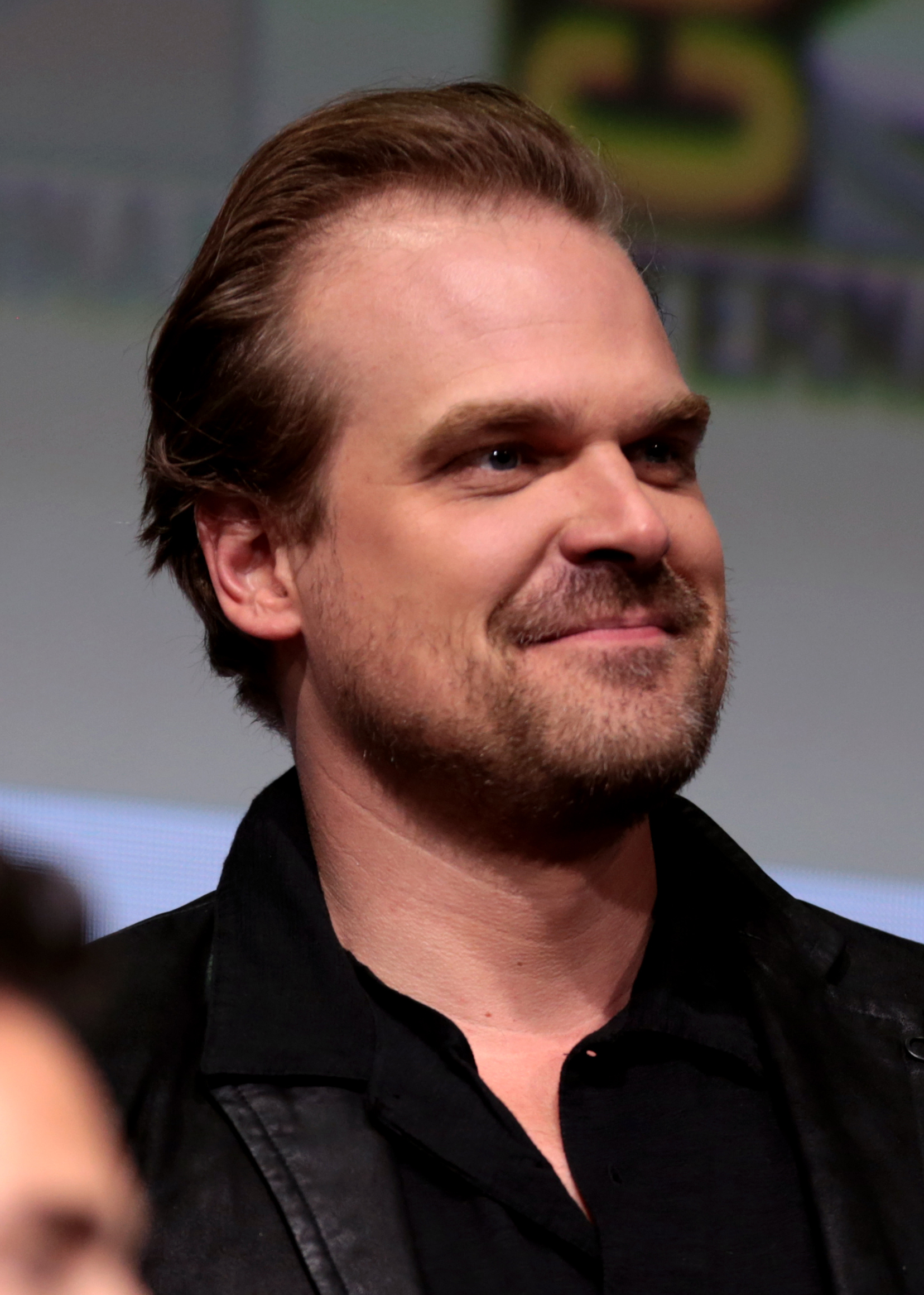
The Duffers cast David Harbour as Sheriff Hopper believing this was his opportunity to play a lead character in a work.

In June 2015, it was announced that Winona Ryder and David Harbour had been cast as Joyce and the unnamed chief of police, respectively. The series marks Winona Ryder's first regular role in a TV series. The brothers' casting director Carmen Cuba had suggested Ryder for the role of Joyce, which the two were immediately drawn to because of her prominence in 1980s films. Levy believed Ryder could "wretch up the emotional urgency and yet find layers and nuance and different sides of [Joyce]". Ryder praised that the show's multiple storylines required her to act for Joyce as "she's out of her mind, but she's actually kind of onto something", and that the producers had faith she could pull off the difficult role. Upon being offered the role, Ryder felt intrigued at being given the pilot's script due to not knowing what streaming was and finding it "terrifying", with her sole condition to the Duffers for accepting the role being that, if a Beetlejuice sequel ever materialized as she and Tim Burton had been discussing since 2000, they had to let her take a break to shoot it, which the Duffers agreed to. This condition would ultimately turn out to be unnecessary, as Ryder filmed for the greenlit sequel Beetlejuice Beetlejuice before starting work on the fifth and final season of Stranger Things. The Duffer Brothers had been interested in Harbour before, who until Stranger Things primarily had smaller roles as villainous characters, and they felt that he had been "waiting too long for this opportunity" to play a lead, while Harbour himself was thrilled by the script and the chance to play "a broken, flawed, anti-hero character".

Additional casting followed two months later with Finn Wolfhard as Mike, Millie Bobby Brown in an undisclosed role, Gaten Matarazzo as Dustin Henderson, Caleb McLaughlin as Lucas Sinclair, Natalia Dyer as Nancy Wheeler, and Charlie Heaton as Jonathan Byers. In September 2015, Cara Buono joined the cast as Karen Wheeler, followed by Matthew Modine as Martin Brenner a month later. Additional cast members who recur in the season include Noah Schnapp as Will, Shannon Purser as Barbara "Barb" Holland, Joe Keery as Steve Harrington, and Ross Partridge as Lonnie Byers.

Actors auditioning for the children's roles read lines from Stand by Me. The Duffers estimated they went through about a thousand different child actors for the roles. They noted that Wolfhard was already "a movie buff" of the films from the 1980s period and easily filled the role, while they found Matarazzo's audition to be much more authentic than most of the other audition tapes, and selected him after a single viewing of his audition tape. As casting was started immediately after Netflix greenlit the show, and prior to the scripts being fully completed, this allowed some of the actors' takes on the roles to reflect into the script. The casting of the young actors for Will and his friends had been done just after the first script was completed, and subsequent scripts incorporated aspects from these actors. The brothers said Modine provided significant input on the character of Dr. Brenner, whom they had not really fleshed out before as they considered him the hardest character to write for given his limited appearances within the narrative.

=== Filming ===
The brothers had desired to film the series around the Long Island area to match the initial Montauk concept. However, with filming scheduled to take place in November 2015, it was difficult to shoot in Long Island in the cold weather, and the production started scouting locations in and around the Atlanta, Georgia area. The brothers, who grew up in North Carolina, found many places that reminded them of their own childhoods in that area, and felt the area would work well with the narrative shift to the fictional town of Hawkins, Indiana.

The filming of the first season began on September 25, 2015, and was extensively done in Atlanta, Georgia, with the Duffers and Levy directing individual episodes. Jackson served as the basis for Hawkins. Other shooting locations included the Georgia Mental Health Institute as the Hawkins National Laboratory site, Bellwood Quarry, Patrick Henry High School in Stockbridge, Georgia, for the middle and high school scenes, Emory University's Continuing Education Department, the former city hall in Douglasville, Georgia, Georgia International Horse Park, the probate court in Butts County, Georgia, Old East Point Library and East Point First Baptist Church in East Point, Georgia, Fayetteville, Georgia, Stone Mountain Park, Palmetto, Georgia, and Winston, Georgia. Set work was done at Screen Gem Studios in Atlanta. The series was filmed with a Red Dragon digital camera. Filming for the first season concluded in early 2016.

While filming, the brothers tried to capture shots that could be seen as homages to many of the 1980s references they recalled. Their goal was not necessarily to fill the work with these references, but instead to make the series seem to the viewer like a 1980s film. They spent little time reviewing those works and instead went by memory. Matt further recognized that some of their filming homages were not purposely done but were found to be very comparable, as highlighted by a fan-made video comparing the show to several 1980s works side by side. Matt commented on the video that "Some were deliberate and some were subconscious." The brothers recognized that many of the iconic scenes from these 1980s films, such as with Poltergeist, was about "taking a very ordinary object that people deal with every day, their television set, and imbuing it with something otherworldly", leading to the idea of using the Christmas light strings for Will to communicate with Joyce.

The brothers attributed much of the 1980s feel to set and costume designers and the soundtrack composers that helped to recreate the era for them. Lynda Reiss, the head of props, had about a $220,000 budget, similar to most films, to acquire artifacts of the 1980s, using eBay and searching through flea markets and estate sales around the Atlanta area. The bulk of the props were original items from the 1980s with only a few pieces, such as the Dungeons & Dragons books made as replicas.

=== Visual effects ===
To create the aged effect for the series, a film grain was added over the footage, which was captured by scanning in film stock from the 1980s. The Duffers wanted to scare the audience, but not to necessarily make the show violent or gory, following in line with how the 1980s Amblin Entertainment films drove the creation of the PG-13 movie rating. It was "much more about mood and atmosphere and suspense and dread than they are about gore", though they were not afraid to push into more scary elements, particularly towards the end of the first season. The brothers had wanted to avoid any computer-generated effects for the monster and other parts of the series and stay with practical effects. However, the six-month filming time left them little time to plan out and test practical effects rigs for some of the shots. They went with a middle ground of using constructed props including one for the monster whenever they could, but for other shots, such as when the monster bursts through a wall, they opted to use digital effects. Post-production on the first season was completed the week before it was released on Netflix.

The title sequence uses closeups of the letters in the Stranger Things title with a red tint against a black background as they slide into place within the title. The sequence was created by the studio Imaginary Forces, formerly part of R/GA, led by creative director Michelle Doughtey. Levy introduced the studio to The Duffer Brothers, who explained their vision of the 1980s-inspired show, which helped the studio to fix the concept the producers wanted. Later, but prior to filming, the producers sent Imaginary Forces the pilot script, the synth-heavy background music for the titles, as well as the various book covers from King and other authors that they had used to establish the title and imagery, and were looking for a similar approach for the show's titles, primarily using a typographical sequence. They took inspiration from several title sequences of works from the 1980s that were previously designed by Richard Greenberg under R/GA, such as Altered States and The Dead Zone. They also got input from Dan Perri, who worked on the title credits of several 1980s films. Various iterations included having letters vanish, to reflect the "missing" theme of the show, and having letters cast shadows on others, alluding to the mysteries, before settling into the sliding letters. The studio began working on the title sequence before filming and took about a month off during the filming process to let the producers get immersed in the show and come back with more input. Initially, they had been working with various fonts for the title and used close-ups of the best features of these fonts, but near the end the producers wanted to work with ITC Benguiat, requiring them to rework those shots. The final sequence is fully computer-generated, but they took inspiration from testing some practical effects, such as using Kodalith masks as would have been done in the 1980s, to develop the appropriate filters for the rendering software. The individual episode title cards used a "fly-through" approach, similar to the film Bullitt, which the producers had suggested to the studio.

=== Music ===
The Stranger Things original soundtrack was composed by Michael Stein and Kyle Dixon of the electronic band Survive. It makes extensive use of synthesizers in homage to 1980s artists and film composers including Jean-Michel Jarre, Tangerine Dream, Vangelis, Goblin, John Carpenter, Giorgio Moroder, and Fabio Frizzi.

According to Stein and Dixon, The Duffer Brothers had been fans of Survive's music, and used their song "Dirge" for the mock trailer that was used to sell the show to Netflix. Once the show was green-lit, the Duffers contacted Survive around July 2015 to ask if they were still doing music; the two provided the production team with dozens of songs from their band's past to gain their interest, helping to land them the role. Once aboard, the two worked with producers to select some of their older music to rework for the show, while developing new music, principally with character motifs. The two had been hired before the casting process, so their motif demos were used and played over the actors' audition tapes, aiding in the casting selection. The show's theme is based on an unused work Stein composed much earlier that ended up in the library of work they shared with the production staff, who thought that with some reworking would be good for the opening credits.

The first season's soundtrack, consisting of 75 songs from Dixon and Stein split across two volumes, was released by Lakeshore Records. Digital release and streaming options were released on August 10 and 19, 2016 for the two volumes, respectively, while retail versions were available on September 16 and 23, 2016.

In addition to original music, Stranger Things features period music from artists including The Clash, Toto, New Order, The Bangles, Foreigner, Echo and the Bunnymen, Peter Gabriel and Corey Hart, as well as excerpts from Tangerine Dream, John Carpenter and Vangelis. In particular, The Clash's "Should I Stay or Should I Go" was specifically picked to play at pivotal moments of the story, such as when Will is trying to communicate with Joyce from the Upside Down. Music supervisor Nora Felder felt the song "furthered the story" and called it an additional, unseen, main character of the season.

== Home media release ==
The first season of Stranger Things was released on a Blu-ray/DVD combo pack exclusively to Target retailers on October 17, 2017, and the same for the 4K/Blu-ray combo pack on November 15, 2017, both of which includes vintage CBS-FOX VHS-inspired packaging.

Stranger Things
| Set details | Special features | |
| Format: AC-3, Blu-ray, DTS Surround Sound, Dubbed, NTSC, Subtitled, Widescreen * Language/Subtitles: English, Spanish * 2:1 aspect ratio * 4-disc set, 8 episodes | Comes with a collectible poster not available for purchase separately from the set. * Retro packaging designed to look like a vintage CBS-FOX VHS cassette tape. | |
DVD release dates
| Region 1 | Region 2 | Region 4 |
| October 17, 2017 (Blu-ray/DVD); November 15, 2017 (4K/Blu-ray) | TBA | TBA |

== Reception ==
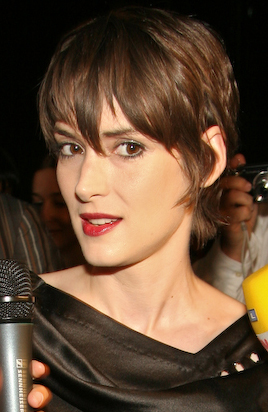
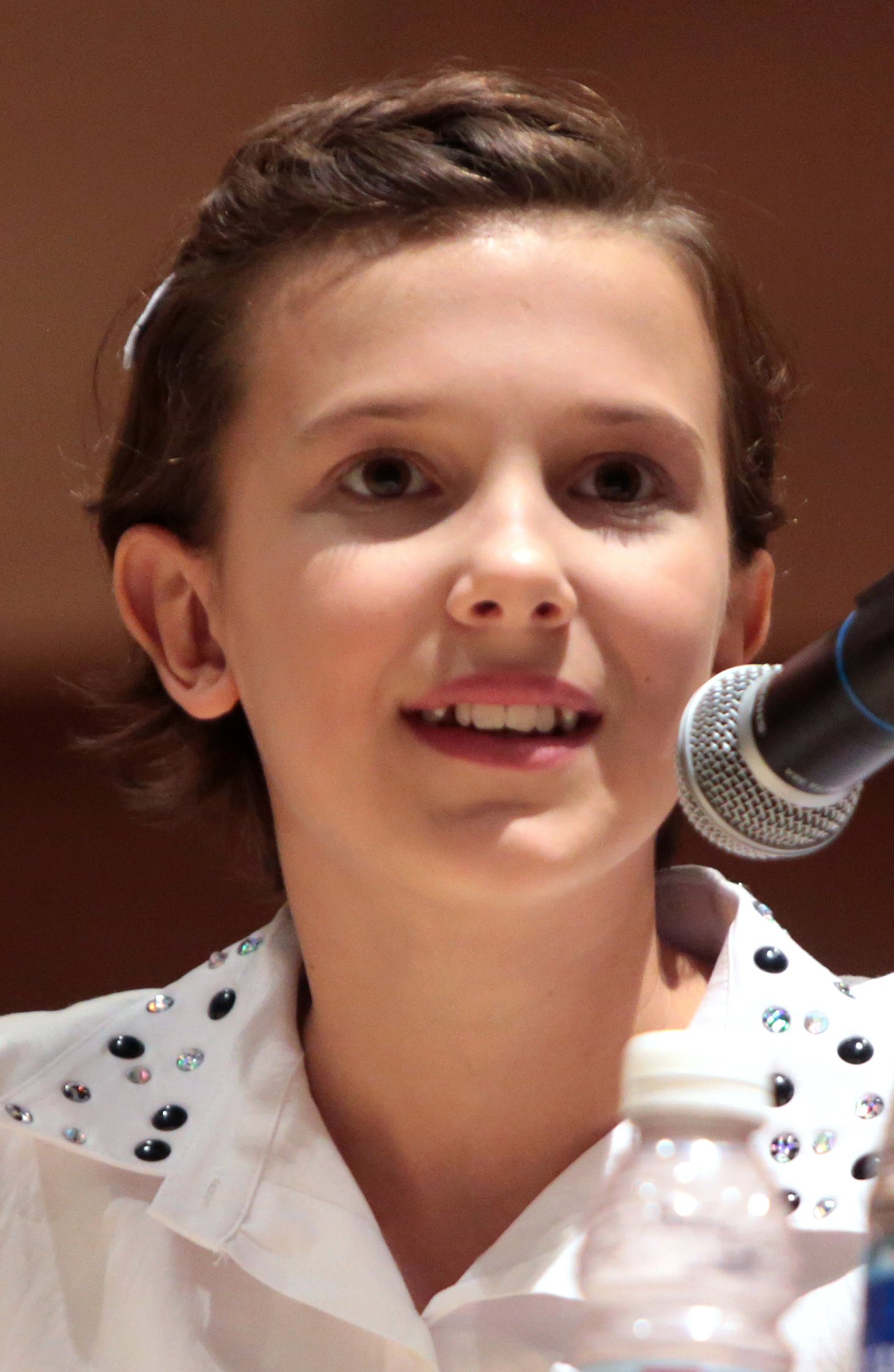
Winona Ryder (left) was nominated for a Golden Globe, Satellite and Screen Actors Guild Award. Millie Bobby Brown (right) was nominated for a Screen Actors Guild Award and an Emmy Award.

=== Audience viewership ===
As Netflix does not reveal subscriber viewership numbers for any of their original series, Symphony Technology Group compiled data for the season based on people using software on their phones that measures television viewing by detecting a program's sound. According to Symphony, within the first 35 days of release, Stranger Things averaged ratings of around 14.07 million adults between the ages of 18 and 49 in the United States. This made it the third most-watched season of Netflix original content in the U.S. at the time behind the first season of Fuller House and fourth season of Orange Is the New Black. In a September 2016 analysis, Netflix found that Stranger Things "hooked" viewers by the second episode of the first season, indicating that the second episode was "the first installment that led at least 70 percent of viewers who watched that episode to complete the entire first season of a show."

In August 2017, the marketing analytics firm Jumpshot determined the season was the seventh-most viewed Netflix season in the first 30 days after it premiered, garnering slightly more than 20% of the viewers that the second season of Daredevil received, which was the most viewed season according to Jumpstart. Jumpshot, which "analyzes click-stream data from an online panel of more than 100 million consumers", looked at the viewing behavior and activity of the company's U.S. members, factoring in the relative number of U.S. Netflix viewers who watched at least one episode of the season.

=== Critical response ===
The season received widespread critical acclaim. Review aggregator Rotten Tomatoes gave the first season an approval rating of 97% based on 92 reviews and a weighted average score of 8.2/10. The site's critical consensus states, "Exciting, heartbreaking, and sometimes scary, Stranger Things acts as an addictive homage to Spielberg films and vintage 1980s television." Review aggregator Metacritic gave the first season a normalized score of 76 out of 100 based on 34 reviews, indicating "generally favorable" reviews. IGN gave the score of 8 out of 10 and called the series "Great" saying, "Stranger Things is an easy recommendation, offering viewers an atmospheric and endearing series that is a nostalgic throwback without feeling like a simple copy."

Critics pointing out the series' homages to the 1980s. In a review of San Francisco Chronicle Dave Wiegand wrote: "Stranger Things reminds us of a time marked by a kind of no-strings escapism. And as it does so, we find ourselves yearning for it because the Duffers have made it so irresistibly appealing. There may be other equally great shows to watch this summer, but I guarantee you won't have more fun watching any of them than you will watching Stranger Things." Joshua Alston of The A.V. Club also reviewed it positively saying, "Balancing style and substance is always challenging for a series like Stranger Things, but the show is perfectly calibrated. It feels like watching a show produced during the era in which it's set, but with the craft of today's prestige television." Reviewing for HitFix, Alan Sepinwall said, "Over the course of the eight hours, the story and characters take on enough life of their own so that the references don't feel self-indulgent, and so that the series can be appreciated even if you don't know the plot of E.T. or the title font of Stephen King's early novels (a huge influence on the show's own opening credits) by heart.".

Variety praised the way the series contrasts horror and suspense, considering some of its scares "joltingly effective". Emily Nussbaum of The New Yorker also applauded the series and wrote, "This is astoundingly efficient storytelling, eight hours that pass in a blink, with even minor characters getting sharp dialogue, dark humor, or moments of pathos." Television critic Mary McNamara of Los Angeles Times said, "For the most part, and in absolute defiance of the odds, Stranger Things honors its source material in the best way possible: By telling a sweet 'n' scary story in which monsters are real but so are the transformative powers of love and fealty." The Wall Street Journal's Brian Kelly said, "Matt Duffer and Ross Duffer, brothers and the show's creators, have done their homework when it comes to '80s cinema. Whether you're a fan of John Carpenter's The Thing or The Goonies is more your speed, there's plenty to like in Stranger Things." Angus McFadzean of Columbia University Press compared Stranger Things to The Goonies, Stand By Me, Russkies, and E.T. the Extra-Terrestrial.

Variety also pointed out that the season addresses ambiguous and sad themes such as loss of innocence and family fragility, considering that the familiar contours of its plot serve as a cover for somewhat deeper explorations. It also considered that the series uses solid genre conventions to explore a range of relatable anxieties.

=== Cultural impact ===
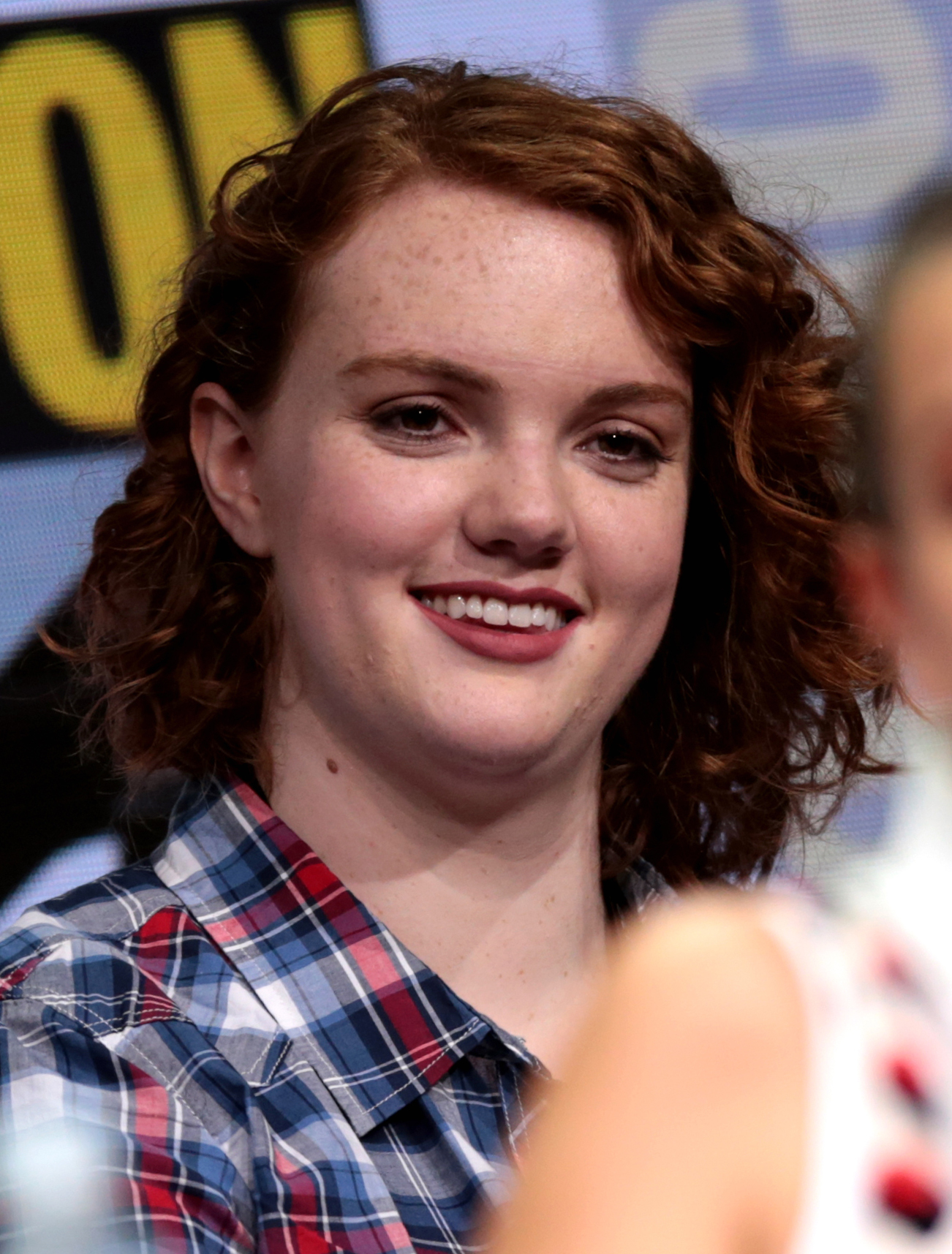
Shannon Purser's performance as Barb received a great deal of attention from fans, and led to her being nominated for Outstanding Guest Actress in a Drama Series.

Shortly after its release, Stranger Things gained a dedicated fanbase. One area of focus from these fans was the character of Barb, the nerdy friend and classmate of Nancy who is taken and killed by the monster early in the season. According to actress Shannon Purser, Barb "wasn't supposed to be a big deal", and The Duffer Brothers had not gone into great detail about the character since the focus was on finding Will. However, many fans sympathized with the character, with Laura Bradley of Vanity Fair suggesting that these people found that Barb would be a similar misfit in society, and "looks more like someone you might actually meet in real life" compared to the other characters, particularly Nancy, in the series. A hashtag "#ImWithBarb" grew in popularity after the series' release, and several fan sites and forums were created to support her. While Purser did not return for the second season, The Duffer Brothers used the real-life "Justice for Barb" movement as inspiration for narrative at the start of the second season, with Nancy addressing the fact "that no one ever cares about" Barb. Purser and several media outlets took her nomination as Barb for Outstanding Guest Actress in a Drama Series in the 69th Primetime Emmy Awards as achieving "justice for Barb", highlighting how well her character was received.

Another impact of the series has been an increased demand for Eggo waffles, as they are shown to be Eleven's favorite food in several episodes and are seen as a representation of the show. The Kellogg Company, which manufactures Eggo, had not been part of the production prior to the first season's release but recognized the market impact of the series. It provided a vintage 1980s Eggo television advertisement for Netflix to use in its Super Bowl LI commercial, and is looking to become more involved with cross-promotion.

As part of its release on Netflix on April 14, 2017, the cast of the rebooted version of Mystery Science Theater 3000 riffed on the first part of "Chapter 1" of Stranger Things.

=== Accolades ===
| Association | Category | Nominee(s) / work | Result | Ref. |
|---|---|---|---|---|
| ACE Eddie Awards | Best Edited One Hour Series for Non-Commercial Television | Dean Zimmerman "Chapter One: The Vanishing of Will Byers" | Nominated | |
| ACE Eddie Awards | Best Edited One Hour Series for Non-Commercial Television | Kevin D. Ross "Chapter Seven: The Bathtub" | Nominated | |
| American Film Institute | Top 10 TV Programs of the Year | Stranger Things | Won | |
| Art Directors Guild | One-Hour Period or Fantasy Single-Camera Television Series | Chris Trujillo "Chapter One: The Vanishing of Will Byers", "Chapter Three: Holly, Jolly" and "Chapter Eight: The Upside Down" | Nominated | |
| Bram Stoker Awards | Superior Achievement in a Screenplay | The Duffer Brothers "Chapter One: The Vanishing of Will Byers" | Nominated | |
| Bram Stoker Awards | Superior Achievement in a Screenplay | The Duffer Brothers "Chapter Eight: The Upside Down" | Nominated | |
| British Academy of Film and Television Arts | Best International Program | Matt Duffer, Ross Duffer, Shawn Levy, Dan Cohen | Nominated | |
| Cinema Audio Society | Outstanding Achievement in Sound Mixing for Television Series – One Hour | Chris Durfy, Joe Barnett, Adam Jenkins, Judah Getz and John Guentner "Chapter Seven: The Bathtub" | Nominated | |
| Costume Designers Guild | Outstanding Period Television Series | Kimberly Adams, Malgosia Turzanska | Nominated | |
| Critics' Choice Television Awards | Best Drama Series | Stranger Things | Nominated | |
| Critics' Choice Television Awards | Most Bingeworthy Show | Stranger Things | Nominated | |
| Directors Guild of America Awards | Outstanding Directorial Achievement for a Drama Series | Duffer Brothers "Chapter One: The Vanishing of Will Byers" | Nominated | |
| Dragon Awards | Best Science Fiction or Fantasy TV Series | Stranger Things | Won | |
| Primetime Emmy Awards | Outstanding Drama Series | Stranger Things | Nominated | |
| Primetime Emmy Awards | Outstanding Supporting Actor in a Drama Series | David Harbour as Jim Hopper "Chapter Eight: The Upside Down" | Nominated | |
| Primetime Emmy Awards | Outstanding Supporting Actress in a Drama Series | Millie Bobby Brown as Eleven / Jane Ives "Chapter Seven: The Bathtub" | Nominated | |
| Primetime Emmy Awards | Outstanding Directing for a Drama Series | The Duffer Brothers "Chapter One: The Vanishing of Will Byers" | Nominated | |
| Primetime Emmy Awards | Outstanding Writing for a Drama Series | The Duffer Brothers "Chapter One: The Vanishing of Will Byers" | Nominated | |
| Primetime Emmy Awards | Outstanding Guest Actress in a Drama Series | Shannon Purser as Barb Holland "Chapter Three: Holly, Jolly" | Nominated | |
| Primetime Emmy Awards | Outstanding Production Design for a Narrative Period Program (One Hour or More) | Chris Trujillo, William Davis, Jess Royal "Chapter One: The Vanishing of Will Byers" | Nominated | |
| Primetime Emmy Awards | Outstanding Casting for a Drama Series | Carmen Cuba, Tara Feldstein, Chase Paris | Won | |
| Primetime Emmy Awards | Outstanding Cinematography for a Single-Camera Series (One Hour) | Tim Ives "Chapter Eight: The Upside Down" | Nominated | |
| Primetime Emmy Awards | Outstanding Single-Camera Picture Editing for a Drama Series | Dean Zimmerman "Chapter One: The Vanishing of Will Byers" | Won | |
| Primetime Emmy Awards | Outstanding Single-Camera Picture Editing for a Drama Series | Kevin D. Ross "Chapter Seven: The Bathtub" | Nominated | |
| Primetime Emmy Awards | Outstanding Hairstyling for a Single-Camera Series | Sarah Hindsgaul, Evelyn Roach "Chapter Two: The Weirdo on Maple Street" | Nominated | |
| Primetime Emmy Awards | Outstanding Makeup for a Single-Camera Series (Non-Prosthetic) | Myke Michaels, Teresa Vest "Chapter Six: The Monster" | Nominated | |
| Primetime Emmy Awards | Outstanding Music Supervision | Nora Felder "Chapter Two: The Weirdo on Maple Street" | Nominated | |
| Primetime Emmy Awards | Outstanding Sound Editing for a Series | Bradley North, Craig Henighan, Jordan Wilby, Jonathan Golodner, Tiffany S. Griffth, Sam Munoz, David Klotz, Noel Vought, Ginger Geary "Chapter Eight: The Upside Down" | Won | |
| Primetime Emmy Awards | Outstanding Sound Mixing for a Comedy or Drama Series (One Hour) | Joe Barnett, Adam Jenkins, Chris Durfy, Bill Higley "Chapter Eight: The Upside Down" | Nominated | |
| Primetime Emmy Awards | Outstanding Main Title Design | Michelle Dougherty, Peter Frankfurt, Arisu Kashiwagi, Eric Demeusy | Won | |
| Primetime Emmy Awards | Outstanding Original Main Title Theme Music | Michael Stein, Kyle Dixon | Won | |
| Primetime Emmy Awards | Outstanding Creative Achievement in Interactive Media within a Scripted Program | Netflix, CBS Digital; Stranger Things VR Experience | Nominated | |
| Fangoria Chainsaw Awards | Best TV Series | Stranger Things | Won | |
| Fangoria Chainsaw Awards | Best TV Actress | Millie Bobby Brown | Won | |
| Fangoria Chainsaw Awards | Best TV Supporting Actor | David Harbour | Nominated | |
| Fangoria Chainsaw Awards | Best TV Supporting Actress | Winona Ryder | Won | |
| Gold Derby TV Awards | Drama Series | Stranger Things | Won | |
| Gold Derby TV Awards | Drama Supporting Actress | Millie Bobby Brown | Nominated | |
| Gold Derby TV Awards | Drama Supporting Actress | Winona Ryder | Nominated | |
| Gold Derby TV Awards | Drama Supporting Actor | David Harbour | Nominated | |
| Gold Derby TV Awards | Drama Episode | Justin Doble, The Duffer Brothers "Chapter Seven: The Bathtub" | Nominated | |
| Gold Derby TV Awards | Drama Episode | Paul Ditcher, The Duffer Brothers "Chapter Eight: The Upside Down" | Nominated | |
| Gold Derby TV Awards | Ensemble of the Year | Cast of Stranger Things | Nominated | |
| Gold Derby TV Awards | Breakthrough Performer of the Year | Millie Bobby Brown | Won | |
| Golden Globe Awards | Best Television Series – Drama | Stranger Things | Nominated | |
| Golden Globe Awards | Best Actress – Television Series Drama | Winona Ryder | Nominated | |
| Golden Reel Awards | Best Sound Editing: TV Short Form – Music | David Klotz "Chapter Three: Holly Jolly" | Won | |
| Golden Reel Awards | Best Sound Editing: TV Short Form - FX/Foley | Jacob McNaughton "Chapter Eight: The Upside Down" | Nominated | |
| Grammy Awards | Best Score Soundtrack for Visual Media | Stranger Things Volume 1 | Nominated | |
| Grammy Awards | Best Score Soundtrack for Visual Media | Stranger Things Volume 2 | Nominated | |
| Hollywood Music in Media Awards | Best Main Title – TV Show/Digital Streaming Series | Kyle Dixon and Michael Stein | Nominated | |
| Hollywood Music in Media Awards | Best Original Score – TV Show/Miniseries | Kyle Dixon and Michael Stein | Nominated | |
| Hollywood Music in Media Awards | Outstanding Music Supervision – Television | Nora Felder | Won | |
| Hugo Awards | Best Dramatic Presentation, Long Form | The Duffer Brothers | Nominated | |
| Location Managers Guild Awards | Outstanding Locations in Period Television | Tony Holley | Nominated | |
| Make-Up Artists & Hair Stylists Guild | Best Period and/or Character Makeup – Television | Amy L. Forsythe, Samantha Smith | Nominated | |
| Make-Up Artists & Hair Stylists Guild | Best Period and/or Character Hair Styling – Television | Sarah Hindsgaul, Evelyn Roach | Nominated | |
| MTV Movie & TV Awards | TV show of the Year | | Won | |
| MTV Movie & TV Awards | Best Actor in a TV Show | Millie Bobby Brown | Won | |
| MTV Movie & TV Awards | Best Villain | The Demogorgon | Nominated | |
| MTV Movie & TV Awards | Best Hero | Millie Bobby Brown | Nominated | |
| National Television Awards | Best Period Drama | Stranger Things | Nominated | |
| People's Choice Awards | Favorite TV Show | Stranger Things | Nominated | |
| People's Choice Awards | Favorite Premium Sci-Fi/Fantasy Series | Stranger Things | Nominated | |
| People's Choice Awards | Favorite Sci-Fi/Fantasy TV Actress | Millie Bobby Brown | Nominated | |
| Peabody Awards | Best Entertainment Program | Stranger Things | Nominated | |
| Producers Guild of America | Episodic Television, Drama | Duffer Brothers, Shawn Levy, Dan Cohen, Iain Paterson | Won | |
| Satellite Awards | Best Television Series – Genre | Stranger Things | Nominated | |
| Satellite Awards | Best Actress – Television Series Drama | Winona Ryder | Nominated | |
| Saturn Awards | Best New Media Television Series | Stranger Things | Won | |
| Saturn Awards | Best Actress on a Television Series | Winona Ryder | Nominated | |
| Saturn Awards | Best Younger Actor on a Television Series | Millie Bobby Brown | Won | |
| Screen Actors Guild Awards | Outstanding Performance by a Female Actor in a Drama Series | Millie Bobby Brown | Nominated | |
| Screen Actors Guild Awards | Outstanding Performance by a Female Actor in a Drama Series | Winona Ryder | Nominated | |
| Screen Actors Guild Awards | Outstanding Performance by an Ensemble in a Drama Series | Main cast | Won | |
| Society of Camera Operators | Camera Operator of the Year – Television | Bob Gorelick | Nominated | |
| Television Critics Association | Program of the Year | Stranger Things | Nominated | |
| Television Critics Association | Outstanding Achievement in Drama | Stranger Things | Nominated | |
| Television Critics Association | Outstanding New Program | Stranger Things | Nominated | |
| Teen Choice Awards | Choice Sci-Fi/Fantasy TV Show | Stranger Things | Nominated | |
| Teen Choice Awards | Choice Breakout TV Show | Stranger Things | Nominated | |
| Teen Choice Awards | Choice Breakout TV Star | Finn Wolfhard | Nominated | |
| Teen Choice Awards | Choice Breakout TV Star | Millie Bobby Brown | Nominated | |
| Visual Effects Society | Outstanding Visual Effects in a Photoreal Episode | Marc Kolbe, Aaron Sims, Olcun Tan | Nominated | |
| Writers Guild of America | Drama Series | Stranger Things | Nominated | |
| Writers Guild of America | New Series | Stranger Things | Nominated | |
