= The Hopes & Dreams of Gazza Snell =

- Directed by: Brendan Donovan
- Written by: Brendan Donovan; David Brechin-Smith
- Produced by: Robin Scholes
- Starring: William McInnes; Robyn Malcolm; Josh McKenzie
- Cinematography: Tristan Milani
- Edited by: Chris Plummer
- Music by: Mario Grigorov
- Release date: 10 July 2010
- Running time: 80 min
- Country: New Zealand
- Language: English

The Hopes & Dreams of Gazza Snell is a 2010 New Zealand film directed by Brendan Donovan.

Gazza Snell dreams of his sons succeeding in karting but his obsession is destorying his marriage.

== Cast ==
- William McInnes as Gazza Snell
- Robyn Malcolm as Gail Snell
- Joel Tobeck as Ron
- Josh McKenzie as Marc Snell
- Sarah Peirse as Dr. Riebeeck
- Melissa Xiao as Jee
- William McKenzie as Ed Snell
- Brendhan Lovegrove as Tinks

== Reception ==
The New Zealand Herald's Russell Baillie says "the script, while offering some high-volume character notes, can't sustain its storytelling over a feature-length, and it also suffers from one too many jarring clashes of tone." Barney McDonald of the Sunday Star Times gave it 4 stars and calls it "a heart- warming tale about the unravelling of a tight-knit family, and it also includes a few wry observations about the ethnic makeup of one of the country's most culturally divergent suburbs."

In the Tribune David Collins gave it 3 stars and finishes "As the film barrels along to its conclusion, the story becomes increasingly trapped by the beats it has to follow. To be sure, nothing in the film is bad, although it gets pretty close at the end with Gazza's voiceover telling us essentially that the secret was inside him all along - it's just too safe to be completely satisfying." TVNZ's Darren Bevan gave it 8/10. He says "There's also a lot of honesty on display in this film - in the performances, the writing and the direction - it's an unashamedly crowd pleasing film which is easily identifiable to many of us."

Graeme Tucket of Stuff notes "A few more script drafts might have brought these strands together satisfactorily, but as it stands, The Hopes & Dreams is a collection of scenes that don't quite hang together."

== Awards ==
2011 Aotearoa Film & Television Awards

- Outstanding Feature Film Debut: Josh McKenzie - won
- Best Lead Actress in a Feature Film: Robin Malcolm - nominated
- Best Supporting Actor in a Feature Film: Josh McKenzie - nominated
- Best Sound in a Feature Film: Tim Prebble, Chris Todd, Mike Hedges & Gilbert Lake - nominated
