= Northspur (film) =

- Directed by: Aaron Falvey
- Written by: Justin Eade
- Produced by: Justin Eade; Aaron Falvey; Patrick Garcia; Barry Sangster; Emily Thompson; Kevin Weisberg
- Starring: Josh McKenzie; Delaney Tabron; Marshall Napier
- Cinematography: Kent Belcher
- Edited by: Jack Brown
- Music by: Jonny Higgins
- Release date: 1 September 2022
- Running time: 100 min
- Country: New Zealand
- Language: English
- Budget: $160, 000

Northspur is a 2022 New Zealand film written by Justin Eade, directed by Aaron Falvey and filmed in Marlborough. It had its premiere in Blenheim in Marlborough.

== Cast ==
- Josh McKenzie as Kellan
- Delaney Tabron as Melinda
- Marshall Napier as Summers
- Kali Kopae as Shell
- Michael Hurst as Green
- Nell Fisher as Tia
- Rama Marrow as Robbie

== Reception ==
James Croot in Stuff gave it 3 1/2 stars and says it "is a well-paced and thought-out tale that ratchets up the tension nicely (even if some of the character connections feel a little contrived)." RNZ's At The Movies says "No one can accuse the makers of Northspur - director Aaron Falvey and writer Justin Eade - of thinking small."
