= Nell Fisher =

British and New Zealand actress (born 2011)

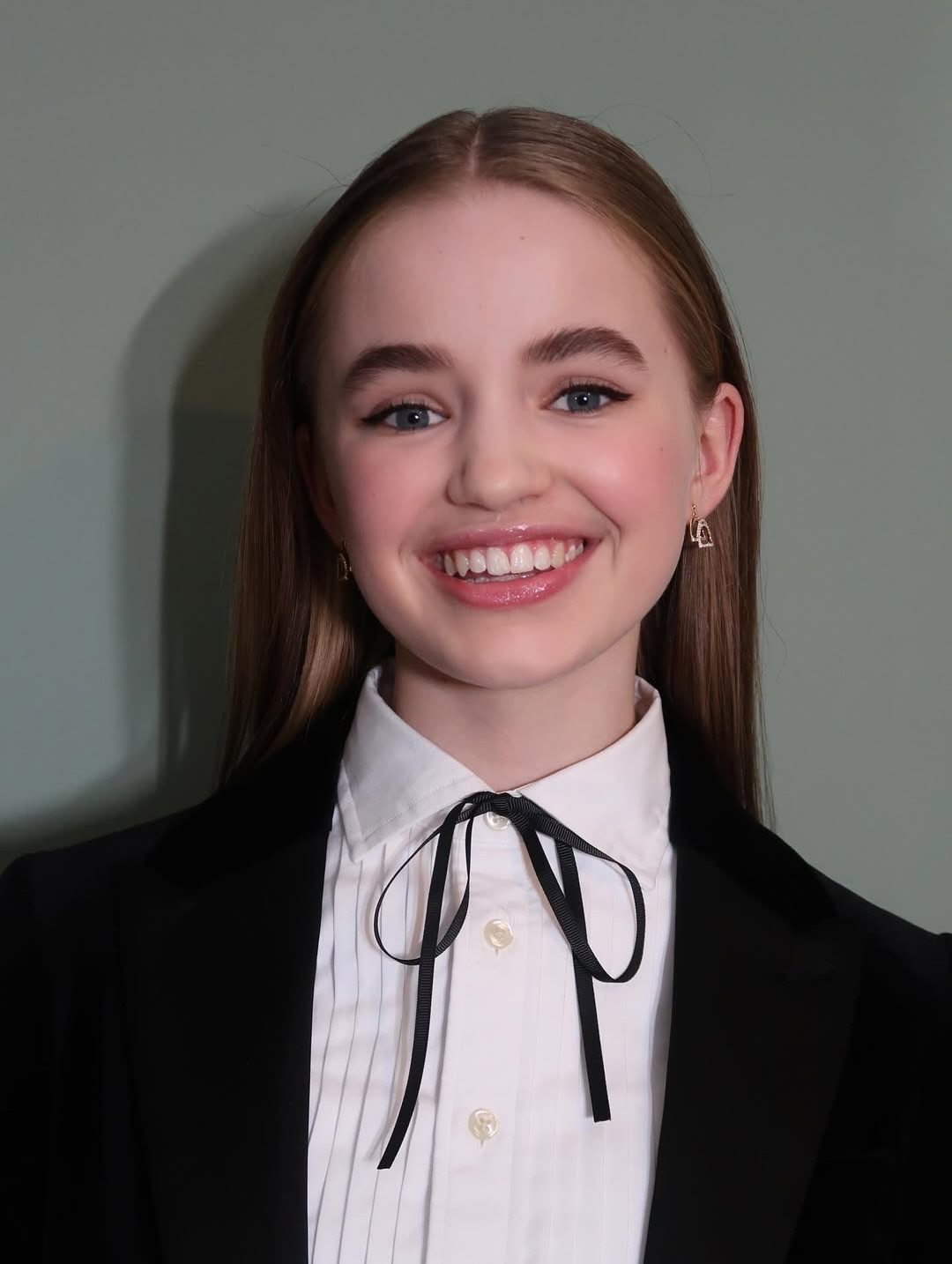
- Fisher in 2025
- Born: 2 November 2011 (age 15); London, England
- Citizenship: United Kingdom; New Zealand
- Occupation: Actress
- Years active: 2022–present
- Parents: Toby Fisher (father); Laura Clarke (mother)

Nell Fisher (born 2 November 2011) is a British-New Zealand actress. She is best known for portraying Holly Wheeler in the fifth and final season of the Netflix science fiction horror series Stranger Things (2025). She also starred in the films Evil Dead Rise (2023) and Bookworm (2024). She was named a 2026 Brit to Watch by Variety.

== Early life ==
Nell Fisher was born in London, England, on 2 November 2011. Her father, Toby Fisher, is an environmental lawyer and former actor from New Zealand. Her mother, Laura Clarke, is a British diplomat who served as high commissioner to New Zealand from 2018 to 2022. Fisher had an international upbringing and lived in New Zealand for four years during her childhood, where she began her acting career. She lived in Wellington, New Zealand, and the United Kingdom during her childhood. As of November 2025, she resides in London. Fisher studies several languages, including Russian, Ancient Greek, and Latin.

== Career ==
=== 2022–2024: Early work and film debut ===
Fisher began her professional acting career in 2022. Her debut film role was as Tia in the New Zealand post-apocalyptic film Northspur. In the film, her character encounters the protagonist Kellan (Josh McKenzie) as he searches for a cure for his wife. During the same year, she appeared in two episodes of the Australian crime-comedy television series My Life Is Murder.

In 2023, Fisher gained recognition for her role in the horror film Evil Dead Rise. She played the character Kassie, whose mother becomes possessed by a demon. The film's director, Lee Cronin, had Fisher use fake blood and vomit before filming to ensure she was comfortable with the horror elements. Critics praised her performance in the film. That same year, she appeared in the interactive romantic comedy Choose Love, portraying the character Luisa.

In 2024, Fisher starred in the adventure comedy Bookworm. She played Mildred, a precocious 12-year-old girl who goes on a quest with her estranged magician father, played by Elijah Wood, to find a mythical creature known as the Canterbury Panther. The film premiered at the 28th Fantasia International Film Festival.

=== 2025: Stranger Things ===
Fisher joined the cast of Stranger Things for its fifth and final season, which was released in three volumes beginning on 26 November 2025. She was cast as Holly Wheeler, the younger sister of main characters Mike Wheeler and Nancy Wheeler. The role had previously been played by twins Anniston and Tinsley Price in prior seasons. The show's creators, the Duffer Brothers, recast the role because the character required a larger presence and more maturity for the final season's storyline, which explores themes of lost innocence. Executive producer Shawn Levy stated that the season centers on Holly to emphasize the show's focus on vulnerability.

In the fifth season, Fisher's character has a central storyline involving an interaction with the villain Vecna, played by Jamie Campbell Bower. He appears to her as a friendly imaginary friend she calls "Mr. Whatsit", who is revealed to be Henry Creel. During the season, Holly is kidnapped by a Demogorgon and taken to a "prison of memories", where she encounters the character Max Mayfield. Fisher cited the 1962 novel A Wrinkle in Time as a literary influence on the character's development and her relationship with the supernatural elements.

The season's second episode is titled "The Vanishing of Holly Wheeler", which references the show's pilot episode, "The Vanishing of Will Byers". Fisher filmed scenes involving stunts, including an underwater sequence with actress Cara Buono. While working on the production, she received guidance from her co-stars, Finn Wolfhard and Bower, regarding acting techniques.

== Filmography ==
Film roles
Year	Title	Role	Notes	Refs.
2022	Northspur	Tia		
2023	Evil Dead Rise	Kassie Bixler		
2023	Choose Love	Luisa		
2024	Bookworm	Mildred		

Television roles
Year	Title	Role	Notes	Refs.
2022	My Life Is Murder	Olive Crowe	2 episodes	
2025	Stranger Things	Holly Wheeler	Main cast (Season 5)	
TBA	The God of the Woods	Barbara Van Laar	Main role	
