= Josh McKenzie =

New Zealand actor

- Born: 1988 (age 37–38); New Zealand
- Occupations: Actor, writer, producer
- Years active: 2010–present
- Known for: The Hunting Party, La Brea, The Hopes and Dreams of Gazza Snell

Josh McKenzie (born 1988) is a New Zealand actor, writer, and producer. He first gained recognition in his home country for his role in 2011 feature film The Hopes and Dreams of Gazza Snell. He has since built an international career with roles in television series such as La Brea, The Hunting Party, and The Twelve.

== Early life and education ==
Josh McKenzie was born in 1988 in New Zealand and is of NZ European ethnicity. He is the son of Angela Vaughan, an actress. Growing up, his family was divided between sports and arts, an environment he has described as straddling both worlds. He attended the Toi Whakaari: New Zealand Drama School, an intensive acting academy whose alumni include Cliff Curtis and Robyn Malcolm.

== Career ==
McKenzie's professional career began while he was still in high school. His early work included a guest role in the television series Legend of the Seeker in 2010. In 2011, McKenzie's performance as Marc Snell in the feature film The Hopes & Dreams of Gazza Snell served as his breakthrough. For this role, he was awarded the Most Outstanding Debut Performance at the Aotearoa Film & Television Awards (AFTAs). He was also nominated for Best Supporting Actor at the New Zealand film and television awards. He was also nominated for Best Supporting Actor at the same ceremony. Following his success, he established himself in New Zealand television with roles in popular series such as Go Girls, Nothing Trivial, and Girl vs. Boy.

He joined the cast of New Zealand's long-running nightly drama Shortland Street in 2013, playing Nate Clark. A major domestic role came in 2015 when he was cast as John Jnr. Truebridge in Filthy Rich, described at the time as New Zealand's highest-budgeted television production. He played a playboy with sociopathic tendencies for two series. He also portrayed New Zealand rugby legend Dan Carter in the 2014 television film The Kick. McKenzie has also starred roles in fantasy series such as The Shannara Chronicles and Power Rangers Megaforce.

In 2021, he was cast in a main role on the NBC science-fiction series La Brea. Following his appearance on La Brea, he secured a lead role as juror Joey Kovac in the second season of the acclaimed Australian anthology series The Twelve in 2024. His most recent major role is as Shane Florence, a former soldier and prison guard, in the NBC crime thriller series The Hunting Party.

McKenzie has also worked behind the camera as a writer, producer, and director. In 2014, he co-wrote, directed, starred in, and produced the satirical web series The Transplants. In 2021, he co-wrote, produced, composed music for, and starred in the web series Boyfriend, a project he has stated he is adapting into a feature film.

== Filmography ==
Year	Title	Role	Format
2011	The Hopes & Dreams of Gazza Snell	Marc Snell	Feature Film
2013	Power Rangers Megaforce	Jordan	TV Series
2013–2014	Shortland Street	Nate Clark	TV Series
2014	The Kick	Dan Carter	Television Film
2016	The Shannara Chronicles	Tye	TV Series
2016–2017	Filthy Rich	John Truebridge Jnr	TV Series
2019–22	Five Bedrooms	Xavier	TV Series
2021–23	La Brea	Lucas Hayes	TV Series
2021	Boyfriend	Levi	Web Series
2022	Northspur	Kellan	Feature Film
2024	The Twelve	Joey Kovac	TV Series
2025–2026	The Hunting Party	Shane Florence	TV Series
