= Shannon Purser =

American actress

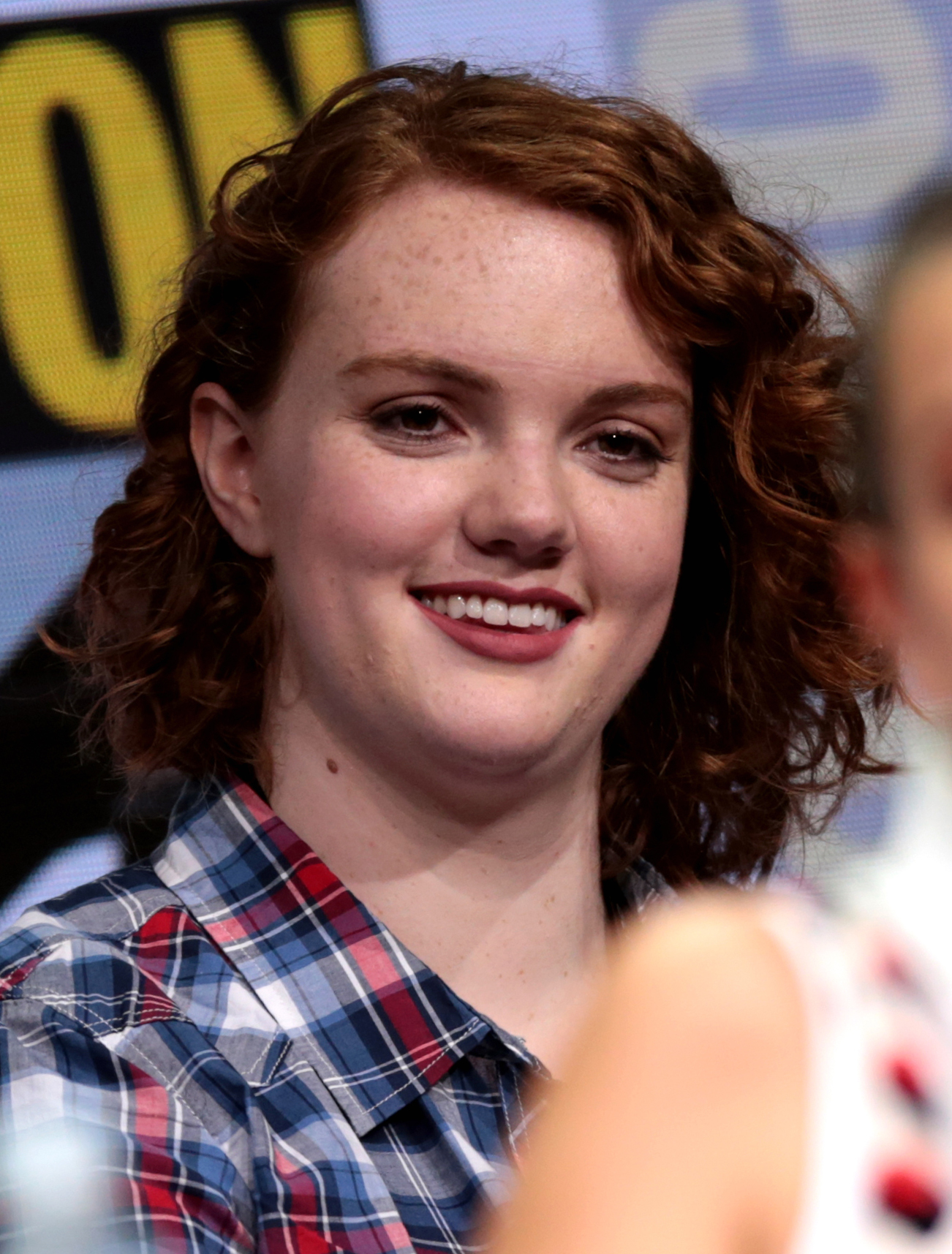
- Purser in 2017
- Born: June 27, 1997 (age 29); Atlanta, Georgia, U.S.
- Education: Kennesaw State University
- Occupation: Actress
- Years active: 2016–present

Shannon Purser (born June 27, 1997) is an American actress. She made her acting debut as Barb Holland in the first season of the Netflix drama series Stranger Things (2016), for which she was nominated for the Primetime Emmy Award for Outstanding Guest Actress in a Drama Series.

Purser made her film debut in the supernatural horror film Wish Upon (2017), and starred in the romantic comedy Sierra Burgess Is a Loser (2018). She also portrayed the recurring role of Ethel Muggs in the CW teen drama series Riverdale (2017–2023).

== Early life ==
Purser was born on June 27, 1997, in Atlanta, Georgia. In 2016, Purser was attending Kennesaw State University. She formerly worked at a movie theater in her hometown of Roswell, Georgia, but quit in order to focus on acting.

== Career ==
Purser made her acting debut in the Netflix science fiction drama series Stranger Things. She portrayed the character Barbara Holland, an intelligent and outspoken girl, who is the best friend of Nancy Wheeler (Natalia Dyer). Despite her being a minor character and killed off in the third episode, several outlets called Barb one of their favorite characters. The role brought Purser to international fame, and earned her a nomination for the Primetime Emmy Award for Outstanding Guest Actress in a Drama Series.

Purser portrays Ethel Muggs in The CW's teen drama series Riverdale. In 2018, she played the titular role in the film Sierra Burgess Is a Loser. She had a minor role in the comedy film Life of the Party, which ended up being cut. Purser played Annabelle Bowman, a member of the drama troupe at Stanton High, in the drama Rise, and read the audiobook of Leah on the Offbeat.

In 2026, it was announced that Purser will make her NYC stage debut this fall in The Ask, an off-Broadway play co-starring Marilu Henner.

== Personal life ==
Purser is an amateur visual artist and musician. She has spoken about living with obsessive–compulsive disorder, and regularly advocates for mental health and anxiety-awareness. In 2017, Purser came out as bisexual.

== Filmography ==
=== Film ===
Year	Title	Role	Notes
2017	Wish Upon	June Acosta	
2018	Life of the Party	Connie	Deleted scenes
2018	Sierra Burgess Is a Loser	Sierra Burgess	

=== Television ===
Year	Title	Role	Notes
2016	Stranger Things	Barbara "Barb" Holland	3 episodes
2017–2023	Riverdale	Ethel Muggs	25 episodes
2018	Rise	Annabelle Bowman	10 episodes
2018–2019	Final Space	Shannon Thunder (voice)	4 episodes
2020	Room 104	Megan	Episode: "The Hikers"
2020	Equal	Del Martin	Docuseries, 1 episode
2022	The First Lady	Peg	Episode: "Please Allow Me"
2025	Mono	Torayo Kurokuma (voice)	English dub
2025	Watson	Shannon	Episode: "Shannon Says Bex Loves Micah"

== Awards and nominations ==
Year	Award	Category	Work	Result	Ref.
2017	Primetime Emmy Awards	Outstanding Guest Actress in a Drama Series	Stranger Things	Nominated	
