= Hidden (2015 film) =

- Theatrical release poster
- Directed by: Matt Duffer; Ross Duffer
- Written by: Matt Duffer; Ross Duffer
- Produced by: Lawrence Grey; Roy Lee; Mason Novick; Richard D. Zanuck
- Starring: Alexander Skarsgård; Andrea Riseborough; Emily Alyn Lind
- Cinematography: Thomas Townend
- Edited by: Jeffrey M. Werner
- Music by: David Julyan
- Production company: Vertigo Entertainment
- Distributed by: Warner Bros. Pictures
- Release date: September 15, 2015
- Running time: 78 minutes
- Country: United States
- Language: English
- Box office: $310,273

Hidden is a 2015 American psychological thriller film written and directed by the Duffer Brothers in their feature film debut. The film stars Alexander Skarsgård, Andrea Riseborough, and Emily Alyn Lind. The film follows a refugee family in the United States and their struggle to survive a strange outbreak and a military intervention.

It was producer Richard D. Zanuck's last film; he died before filming began. Hidden was released in the United States by Warner Bros. Pictures on September 15, 2015. The film received a few positive reviews from critics and grossed $310,273 worldwide.

== Plot ==
An unknown strange outbreak has devastated the United States. A family of three, Ray (Alexander Skarsgård), Claire (Andrea Riseborough), and their daughter Zoe (Emily Alyn Lind), have taken refuge in an abandoned fallout shelter shortly after the Air Force begins bombing the civilian population of their town. Zoe wakes one night after having a nightmare of the 'Breathers'. The family has difficulty coping in their cramped environment but manage by having a set of rules, such as always keeping calm and never leaving the shelter. The three soon discover at dinner that their already dwindling rations are also being consumed by a rat and try to find and kill it. The family also discovers that the rat managed to sneak into the shelter through an opening other than the main barricaded hatch. They find a small air duct but Ray reassures Zoe that the Breathers wouldn't be able to fit through the duct. They believe they may be the only ones left alive. The Breathers have been actively hunting down the family, and have nearly located them multiple times. Claire and Ray's priority is to keep Zoe alive, regardless of what happens to them.

Claire kills the rat but in the process, Ray accidentally knocks over one of their lamps, burning a wooden table. Having put out the fire, the family quickly realizes that the smoke produced from the fire is drifting up the air duct, giving away their position to anyone in the area. Later they discover that the smoke has left ash covering their shelter hatch, making their hiding place visible. Claire and Ray go to the surface to cover and hide their shelter but Zoe, using a homemade periscope, spots a humanoid figure in the distance. Disregarding her mother's rules, Zoe climbs through the barricade to the surface to warn her parents of the Breather. She manages to warn them and they all go back into the shelter, but are followed. Claire, Ray, and Zoe try to keep quiet but Zoe's doll, Olive, gets caught on a nearby pipe screw and activates, making noises. The Breather attempts to break in.

In a flashback to the beginning of the outbreak, Ray, Claire, and Zoe drive along a highway fleeing their town, Kingsville, only to be stopped with many other people by the CDC. Signs all around state that they are under quarantine.

In the present, other Breathers join and finally break through the hatch and into the shelter. Claire and Zoe manage to escape through the air duct but Ray is caught and disappears, followed by a spatter of blood. Claire and Zoe run and end up on the highway where they were stopped by the CDC. Claire and Zoe are caught in a net fired from a helicopter. Breathers, actually American soldiers wearing night vision goggles and re-breather packs, surround them with weapons drawn.

In another flashback, two military jets fly overhead and bomb the family's town. They rush to a nearby abandoned shelter as the rest of the town's population is destroyed by the military. Claire accidentally cuts herself on a rusty piece of iron as she descends into the shelter and notices the flesh around the cut is discolored and her blood black. They deduce that the virus is airborne and they have already been infected.

In the present, the soldiers test Claire and Zoe's blood and interrogate them to find out if there are any others in the vicinity. Afterwards, the soldiers prepare to execute them. Ray suddenly appears and kills one of the soldiers. Ray has black arteries and veins and bloodshot eyes. He incapacitates three more soldiers, demonstrating remarkable physical strength and agility, and is shot multiple times before falling. Claire and Zoe escape from their net, and an enraged Claire transforms like Ray, killing all but one soldier, who injures her. Before he is able to kill Claire, a transformed Zoe appears and exposes the soldier to the air by removing his re-breather, infecting him. Zoe, in her enraged state, almost attacks and kills Claire, but Claire reminds her of their rule to always keep calm. Claire and Zoe sit with Ray during his final moments. Claire notices the helicopter coming back and the two flee.

The two find a sewer system nearby and hide there. They hear someone approaching, who turns out to be Joey, Zoe's friend and next door neighbor. He has survived and leads them to others just like them within the underground sewers. Before Zoe and Claire join the group of infected survivors, Zoe notes how they managed to survive to day 302 while looking at the sun rising through a nearby window. Claire says "Not days," implying that their days are really "miracles", something Ray called each day at the beginning of the film. Claire looks up into the window before climbing through the sewer hole, revealing her bloodshot eyes.

== Cast ==
- Alexander Skarsgård as Ray
- Andrea Riseborough as Claire
- Emily Alyn Lind as Zoe
- Heather Doerksen as Jillian

Other minor roles include David Lewis as Breather Lieutenant; William Ainscough as Joey Neary; and Steven Elliot as Ted Neary

== Production ==
The Duffer Brothers began writing Hiddenshortly after graduating from Chapman University. In December 2011, the screenplay was accepted by Warner Bros. Pictures.

Directed by the Duffer Brothers, Hidden features John Middleton and Sebastian Aloi as executive producers. Roy Lee, Mason Novick, and Lawrence Grey serve as producers. Joe Berg supervised Production.

=== Filming ===
Principal photography on the film began on August 15, 2012, in Vancouver, British Columbia, Canada. Filming took place at Cypress Provincial Park.

== Release ==
Hidden was scheduled for a theatrical release, but Warner opted to release it for streaming services and home media, deeming it "too small". The film premiered on September 15, 2015 in United States, Canada and Mexico. It was released on DVD and on various streaming services, including Amazon Prime Video and Apple TV. In the following years, the title was released in countries across Europe and Asia, as well as in Australia. The release in Italy in March 2017 featured a premiere event. The releases in Poland and Bulgaria—taking place in July 2019 and March 2020, respectively—were carried out via television broadcasts. Moving into the 2020s, the film saw home media releases in Ecuador, the United Arab Emirates, and Singapore

== Reception ==
Hidden received generally positive reviews. The site Morbidly Beautiful considered that its limited release prevented it from gaining much visibility. On the review aggregator website Rotten Tomatoes, 83% of 6 critics' reviews are positive, with an average rating of 5.6/10.. Morbidly considers the film underrated, regarding it as a "gem for fans of the apocalyptic/zombie. subgenre". Despite this, Morbidly pointed out that the film had "obvious" problems due to its low budget.

Morbidly praised the film's performances, especially those of Skarsgård and Lind.

Morbidly praised his writing, considering the film's tension well-constructed, noting that the initially slow pace helped build it. He also praised the way the film made the viewer care about the characters, adding that the various "dumb mistakes" the family makes throughout the movie made them even more human. Morbidly considers that the flashbacks presented throughout the film "helped keep us up to date on the world outside".

Morbidly criticized the film's dark lighting, which made it difficult to read the characters' facial expressions

Daniel Kurland calls it "a very promising, controlled debut feature from Matt and Ross Duffer." It accomplishes what it sets out to do, and does so "in a creative, minimalist manner." Nav Qateel, writing for Influx Magazine, gives the film a grade of "B", calling it a "polished thriller-horror" and "an accomplished film with a satisfying conclusion. It's also very much a grown-up, mature movie that's a far cry from the typical low-budget offerings we're more accustomed to."

== See also ==
- Retreat, a film with a similar plot
