= Ted Wheeler (Stranger Things) =

Stranger Things character

- Stranger Things character
- Joe Chrest as Ted Wheeler in the first season
- First appearance: "Chapter One: The Vanishing of Will Byers" (2016)
- Last appearance: "Chapter Eight: The Rightside Up" (2025)
- Created by: The Duffer Brothers
- Portrayed by: Television Joe Chrest Play: Gilles Geary (West End original cast); Barney Wilkinson (West End, 2024–2025); Tom O'Brien (West End, 2025–2026); Jamie Martin Mann (Broadway)

In-universe information
- Spouse: Karen Wheeler
- Children: Nancy Wheeler; Mike Wheeler; Holly Wheeler
- Home: Hawkins, Indiana, United States
- Nationality: American

Ted Wheeler is a fictional character from the science fiction horror television series Stranger Things. Portrayed by Joe Chrest, Ted is the husband of Karen Wheeler and parent to three children: Mike, Nancy, and Holly. He is a largely absent father, either working, watching television, or sleeping, resulting in him being unaware of the goings-on in both his family and the supernatural occurrences in the fictional town of Hawkins, Indiana.

Discussing his role, Chrest stated that he believed Ted was not a bad dad, just a tired one who works hard to provide for his family. He also stated that he got a lot of comments from people who liked the character, including dads who related to him.

He has been analyzed by critics and authors both for his lacking role in the story as well as his role in the Wheeler family. In particular, his injury when fighting a Demogorgon in the fifth and final season has been the subject of discussion, with multiple critics noting that, while his wife's injuries were given a spotlight, the series has almost no commentary on his injuries or recovery. This was believed to be a reflection of him being useless, which has been described as a "running joke" in the series.

== Appearances ==
First appearing in the first episode of Stranger Things, Ted Wheeler is the husband of Karen Wheeler and parent to Mike, Nancy, and Holly, all living in the fictional town of Hawkins, Indiana. Throughout the story, Ted is largely oblivious to what is going on around him, including the supernatural happenings in the town as well as his family's discontentment. This includes Mike hiding an escaped test subject named Eleven in their house. In season 3, Karen has grown unhappy in her marriage, considering having an affair until she saw Ted sleeping in his chair with Holly in his lap. In season 5, using a golf club for defense, Ted becomes critically injured after an encounter with a Demogorgon after it entered his house, which later critically injured his wife and kidnapped Holly. He makes a recovery and attends Mike's graduation in the final episode of the series.

In the play, Stranger Things: The First Shadow, set in the past, Ted is a teenager at Hawkins High, where he and Karen are portrayed as a "popular attractive high school couple".

In a 2026 episode of Saturday Night Live season 51, a sketch spoofing Stranger Things featured Ted portrayed by Mikey Day.

== Concept and creation ==
Ted Wheeler was created for Stranger Things by The Duffer Brothers and is portrayed by Joe Chrest. He acts as the patriarch of the household, spending much of his time either watching television or sleeping in his chair. He is described by Sarah Campbell of Nerdist as the "stereotypical, perpetually clueless '80s dad". Ted is a stickler over bad language, reprimanding kids when they say profanity. He wears a pair of glasses that belong to Chrest, having been Chrest's from the 9th grade with his current prescription lenses inserted.

The original description written for the casting process described Ted as someone who "would rather be on the golf course than at his house". Chrest stated that he taped part of his audition on a driving range. According to Chrest, the Duffer Brothers loved to write lines for Ted, and would often ask him for his thoughts on what Ted would say in certain situations. On Ted's relationship with Holly, Chrest felt it was different from his relationship with Mike and Nancy, arguing that this may be the case of a father who was not as good a parent with their first children but who used the opportunity of a new child to do better. He also felt that Ted's propensity to sleep so much was a product of him working a lot to take care of the family, but remarked that Ted's children would have likely preferred a present father over their father's labor. Chrest also discussed how he received a lot of comments from people who love Ted, particularly fathers who identify with him.

In the play Stranger Things: The First Shadow, a younger Ted Wheeler is played by multiple people. He was portrayed by Gilles Geary in the first Phoenix Theatre performance, Barney Wilkinson (2024–2025) and Tom O'Brien (2025–2026) at two future Phoenix Theatre performances, and on Broadway by Jamie Martin Mann.

== Reception ==
Ted's relationship with his family has been the subject of discussion, as has his fulfillment of certain parental archetypes of the time. The Mary Sue writer Rachel Leishman stated that she always felt that Ted and Karen were a mismatched couple, expressing a desire for them to get divorced due to Karen being a "lively, fun woman" while Ted just sits and watches television. She was particularly worried about their fates in season 5, stating that if one of them dies, the marriage will still be intact, which she believed would illustrate to the kids that a couple should stick together no matter what. Discussing the support for Ronald Reagan in the 1980s, author Tracey Mollet felt that he and Karen, described by her as "oblivious parents", represented that support. She also touched upon the "ignorance" of the fathers in Stranger Things, which Ted particularly represented to Mollet, citing his unawareness of Mike's disinterest in sports and that he may be hiding a girl in their basement. Quoting Elizabeth Traube, who claimed that experts believed that dads in the 1980s had two key functions: to provide "good sex" to his wife and "inculcate children with their appropriate gender or sex roles", Mollet felt that Ted failed in both these respects, citing Nancy's belief that her parents don't love each other and Ted's inability to connect with his son over Mike's romantic feelings for Eleven. Nerdist writer Michael Walsh stated that, while Ted has been present since the very beginning of the series, he is a "useless" character, describing him as a "lazy, unengaged, wholly disinterested dork who spends most of his free time either sleeping or watching TV" who offloads all the childcare to his wife. Walsh believed Ted was lucky to be with Karen, arguing that she was much more attractive than him.

Author Melissa Vosen Callens believed that the nuclear family of the Wheelers contrasted with the chaotic single-parent household of the Byers, stating that while the latter was unkempt, the Byers had "genuine interactions" that the Wheelers lack. Author Brenda Boudreau drew comparisons between Ted and Lonnie, Joyce's ex-husband, calling both of them "weak and uninvolved" people who both lack an interest in their children's lives. Author Dustin Freeley believed that Ted blended into the background of scenes, in one case literally, his clothing matching the background he was in. Cinema Blend writer Laura Hurley argued that, while Ted was an absent father, he was an invaluable part of the family due to his earnings, which afforded Mike a basement to hide Eleven in and Nancy access to a phone, as well as a trip to California for Mike and Nancy's college ambitions.

During season 2, a fan theory emerged that suggested Ted was the main antagonist of the series; GamesRadar+ writer Lauren Milici stated that she did not believe that, but that she could believe that Ted knows more than he is letting on. She discussed various aspects of this theory, such as the belief that his chair was special due to Eleven having a "weird feeling" when sitting in it and the main antagonist, Vecna, showing Nancy a vision of her family dying that excluded Ted. She found herself unsure whether this was part of the running joke that he does not matter or a clue, stating that she hopes Ted ends up being a villain by the end of the series. In response to a perceived disinterest for his well-being in season 5, The Ringer writer Daniel Chin wrote an article devoted to him, calling him a "running joke" and "source of humor" in the show. He discussed a scene where he was largely absent in an argument at the dinner table, only to question what he did when Nancy and Mike storm off. Chin considered this a "microcosm" for Ted's place in the narrative of the show. Laura Hurley, writing for Cinema Blend, also identified a disinterest in Ted's well-being, stating that he was probably the least-favorite character in his household and uncommon on people's favorite character lists. Despite this, she identified him as having good one-liners, and commended him for defending his family from the Demogorgon.
