= The Duffer Brothers =

American filmmakers and showrunners (born 1984)

Matt and Ross Duffer
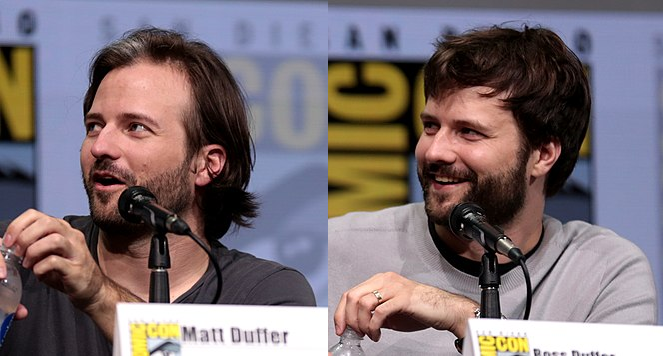
- Matt (left) and Ross (right) Duffer at the 2017 San Diego Comic-Con
- Born: February 15, 1984 (age 42); Durham, North Carolina, U.S.
- Education: Chapman University (BFA)
- Occupations: Writers; directors; producers
- Years active: 2005–present
- Known for: Stranger Things
- Spouse(s): Ross: Leigh Janiak (m. 2015; sep. 2024) Matt: Sarah Hindsgaul (m. 2012)

Matt Duffer and Ross Duffer (born February 15, 1984), often credited as the Duffer Brothers, are both American film and television show makers. The brothers are identical twins and work on all their projects as a pair. They are best known as the creators, showrunners, directors and executive producers of the Netflix supernatural science fiction horror series Stranger Things (2016–2025), and have also written and directed the horror film Hidden (2015) and written and produced episodes of the Fox science fiction series Wayward Pines (2015–2016). The Duffer Brothers founded the production company Upside Down Pictures, which is in an overall deal with Paramount.

== Early lives ==
The Duffer Brothers were born and raised in Durham, North Carolina, the sons of Ann Marie Christensen (born 1951), a part-time real estate broker, and Allen Pace Duffer Jr. (born 1946), a film buff and Research Triangle Institute project director.

They began making films in the third grade, using a Hi8 video camera that was a gift from their parents. They attended the Duke School for Children a private suburban school, from grades K through 8, and then the Charles E. Jordan High School, a large Durham public school.

They were accepted at the Florida State University College of Motion Picture Arts, but were not willing to be educated separately. They toured New York University Tisch School of the Arts Department of Cinema Studies and USC School of Cinematic Arts but were not accepted, but someone they met introduced them to someone, who suggested Chapman University's Dodge College of Film and Media Arts for film study and they relocated to Orange, California, where they graduated in 2007.

== Career ==
=== Early career ===
After the brothers had written and directed several short films, they wrote a script titled Origin, which gained them an agent, and their script for the post-apocalyptic horror film Hidden was acquired by Warner Bros. Pictures in 2011. The brothers directed Hidden, which was released in 2015. Next they were hired as writers and producers for the Fox television series Wayward Pines.

=== Breakthrough with Stranger Things ===
With experience in television, they began pitching their idea for Stranger Things, which Dan Cohen eventually brought to Shawn Levy. Backed by Levy's 21 Laps production company, the show was quickly picked up by Netflix. The show is set in 1980s Indiana and is an homage to 1980s pop culture, inspired and aesthetically informed by the works of Steven Spielberg, John Carpenter, Wes Craven, Sam Raimi, David Lynch, Stephen King, and George Lucas, among others. It was released on July 15, 2016, to overwhelming praise, and began to develop a cult following online.

On September 30, 2019, Netflix announced it had signed the Duffers for additional films and television shows over the coming years. In March 2021, the duo announced they would team up with Spielberg to adapt Stephen King's and Peter Straub's The Talisman as a Netflix series. They would both be executive producers via Amblin Partners and Monkey Massacre and hired Curtis Gwinn, who worked as a writer-executive producer on Stranger Things, to act as writer and showrunner of the project.

Following the premiere of the fourth season of Stranger Things in July 2022, the Duffers launched the production company Upside Down Pictures, named after the fictional dimension in Stranger Things. The studio recommitted to Netflix with several new projects. Among these include a live-action series adaptation of Death Note, a series adaptation of The Talisman, and the Stranger Things animated spin-off Tales from '85. In 2026, they were also the executive producers of The Boroughs, described as a supernatural drama set in a retirement community in the New Mexico desert.

=== Paramount ===
In August 2025, it was announced that the brothers and their company would be signing a four-year deal at Paramount, which resulted in the duo's departure from their long-time partnership at Netflix in April 2026. Their deal at Paramount will not only create new series from the studio's TV and streaming division, but also offers an opportunity for the brothers to produce and direct theatrical feature films for the studio as well, something that the duo were not able to do while signed with Netflix.

== Personal lives ==
Matt has two children with his fiancée, Sarah Hindsgaul; Winona Ryder is the godmother.

Ross married Fear Street trilogy filmmaker Leigh Janiak in December 2015. The couple met in 2006 at a production company in Los Angeles, where Janiak was an assistant to the producer and Ross was an intern. In February 2024, Janiak filed for divorce after eight years of marriage.

== Filmography ==
Film

Year	Title	Directors	Writers
2015	Hidden	Yes	Yes

Television

Year	Title	Directors	Writers	Executive producers	Creators	Notes
2015–2016	Wayward Pines	No	Yes	Co-Executive	No	Wrote 4 episodes
2016–2025	Stranger Things	Yes	Yes	Yes	Yes	Directed 24 episodes; wrote 20 episodes
2026	Something Very Bad Is Going to Happen	No	No	Yes	No	
2026	Stranger Things: Tales from '85	No	No	Yes	Yes	
2026	The Boroughs	No	No	Yes	No	

== Awards ==
Year	Award	Category	Nominated work	Result	Ref.
2016	American Film Institute Award	Top 10 TV Programs of the Year	Stranger Things	Won	
2016	Critics' Choice Television Award	Best Drama Series	Stranger Things	Nominated	
2016	Critics' Choice Television Award	Most Bingeworthy Show	Stranger Things	Nominated	
2017	American Film Institute Award	Top 10 TV Programs of the Year	Stranger Things	Won	
2017	Bram Stoker Award	Best Screenplay	Stranger Things for "Chapter One: The Vanishing of Will Byers"	Nominated	
2017	Bram Stoker Award	Best Screenplay	Stranger Things for "Chapter Eight: The Upside Down"	Nominated	
2017	Bram Stoker Award	Superior Achievement in a Screenplay	Stranger Things for "Chapter One: MADMAX"	Nominated	
2017	British Academy Television Award	Best International Programme	Stranger Things	Nominated	
2017	Directors Guild of America Award	Outstanding Directing – Drama Series	Stranger Things for "Chapter One: The Vanishing of Will Byers"	Nominated	
2017	Dorian Award	TV Drama of the Year	Stranger Things	Nominated	
2017	Dragon Award	Best Science Fiction or Fantasy TV Series	Stranger Things	Won	
2017	Empire Award	Best TV Series	Stranger Things	Nominated	
2017	Fangoria Chainsaw Award	Best TV Series	Stranger Things	Won	
2017	Golden Globe Award	Best Television Series – Drama	Stranger Things	Nominated	
2017	Hugo Award	Best Dramatic Presentation	Stranger Things for the first season	Nominated	
2017	MTV Movie & TV Award	Best Show	Stranger Things	Won	
2017	National Television Award	Best Period Drama	Stranger Things	Nominated	
2017	NME Award	Best TV Series	Stranger Things	Nominated	
2017	People's Choice Award	Favorite TV Show	Stranger Things	Nominated	
2017	Primetime Emmy Award	Outstanding Directing for a Drama Series	Stranger Things for "Chapter One: The Vanishing of Will Byers"	Nominated	
2017	Primetime Emmy Award	Outstanding Drama Series	Stranger Things	Nominated	
2017	Primetime Emmy Award	Outstanding Writing for a Drama Series	Stranger Things for "Chapter One: The Vanishing of Will Byers"	Nominated	
2017	Producers Guild of America Award	Best Episodic Drama	Stranger Things	Won	
2017	Satellite Award	Best Television Series – Genre	Stranger Things	Nominated	
2017	Saturn Award	Best New Media Television Series	Stranger Things	Won (Note: Tied with Marvel's Luke Cage)	
2017	Shorty Award	Best TV Show	Stranger Things	Nominated	
2017	TCA Award	Outstanding Achievement in Drama	Stranger Things	Nominated	
2017	TCA Award	Outstanding New Program	Stranger Things	Nominated	
2017	TCA Award	Program of the Year	Stranger Things	Nominated	
2017	Teen Choice Award	Choice Breakout Series	Stranger Things	Nominated	
2017	Teen Choice Award	Choice Fantasy/Sci-Fi Series	Stranger Things	Nominated	
2017	Writers Guild of America Award	Television: Dramatic Series	Stranger Things	Nominated	
2017	Writers Guild of America Award	Television: New Series	Stranger Things	Nominated	
2018	Critics' Choice Television Award	Best Drama Series	Stranger Things	Nominated	
2018	Directors Guild of America Award	Outstanding Directing – Drama Series	Stranger Things for "Chapter Nine: The Gate"	Nominated	
2018	Empire Award	Best TV Series	Stranger Things	Nominated	
2018	Golden Globe Award	Best Television Series – Drama	Stranger Things	Nominated	
2018	MTV Movie & TV Award	Best Show	Stranger Things	Won	
2018	Nickelodeon Kids' Choice Award	Favorite TV Show	Stranger Things	Won	
2018	NME Award	Best TV Series	Stranger Things	Won	
2018	Primetime Emmy Award	Outstanding Directing for a Drama Series	Stranger Things for "Chapter Nine: The Gate"	Nominated	
2018	Primetime Emmy Award	Outstanding Drama Series	Stranger Things	Nominated	
2018	Primetime Emmy Award	Outstanding Writing for a Drama Series	Stranger Things for "Chapter Nine: The Gate"	Nominated	
2018	Producers Guild of America Award	Best Episodic Drama	Stranger Things	Nominated	
2018	Satellite Award	Best Television Series – Genre	Stranger Things	Nominated	
2018	Saturn Award	Best New Media Television Series	Stranger Things	Nominated	
2018	Teen Choice Award	Choice Fantasy/Sci-Fi Series	Stranger Things	Nominated	
2018	Writers Guild of America Award	Television: Dramatic Series	Stranger Things	Nominated	
2019	Grammy Award	Best Compilation Soundtrack for Visual Media	Stranger Things	Nominated	
2019	Nickelodeon Kids' Choice Award	Favorite TV Drama	Stranger Things	Nominated	
2019	People's Choice Awards	Bingeworthy Show of 2019	Stranger Things	Nominated	
2019	People's Choice Awards	Drama Show of 2019	Stranger Things	Won	
2019	People's Choice Awards	Sci-Fi/Fantasy Show of 2019	Stranger Things	Nominated	
2019	People's Choice Awards	Show of 2019	Stranger Things	Won	
2019	Saturn Award	Best Streaming Horror & Thriller Series	Stranger Things	Won	
2019	Teen Choice Award	Choice Summer TV Show	Stranger Things	Won	
2020	Satellite Award	Best Genre Series	Stranger Things	Won	
2020	Primetime Emmy Award	Outstanding Drama Series	Stranger Things	Nominated	

== See also ==
- List of twins
