= Joe Chrest =

American academic and actor

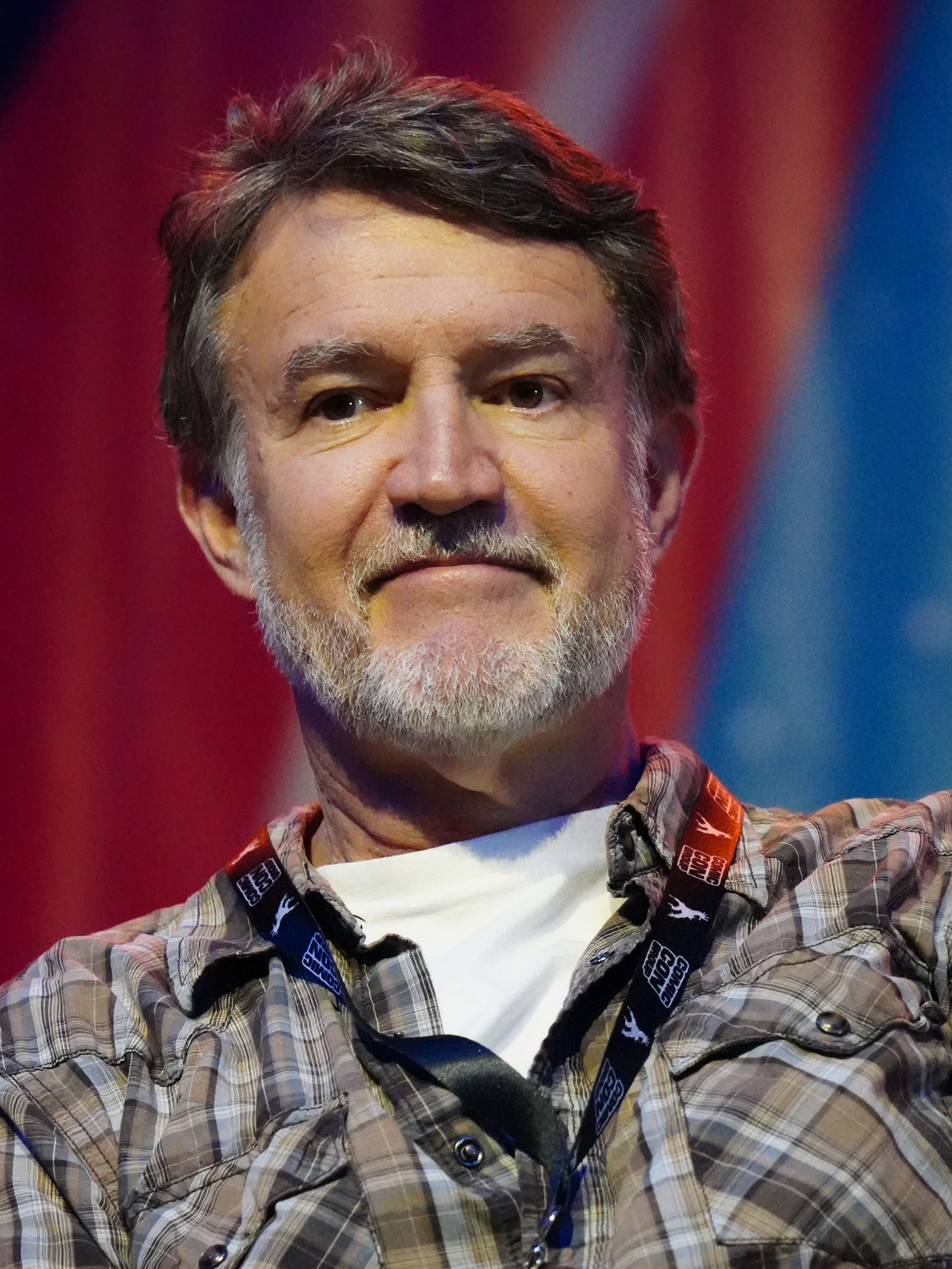
- Chrest in 2026
- Born: Joseph Chrest; May 26, 1963 (age 63); Saint Albans, West Virginia, U.S
- Occupations: Academic; actor
- Years active: 1993–present

Joseph Chrest (born May 26, 1963) is an American academic and actor. He has had roles in numerous films and television series including 21 Jump Street (2012) and its sequel 22 Jump Street (2014), Oldboy, The Butler (both 2013), The Perfect Date (2019), and as Ted Wheeler in Stranger Things (2016–2025).

== Early life and education ==
Chrest was born and raised in St. Albans, West Virginia, where he attended St. Albans High School. He earned his undergraduate degree from Marshall University. In the late 1980s, he earned an MFA in acting from Louisiana State University in Baton Rouge, Louisiana.

== Career ==
Chrest is an adjunct professor at the School of Theatre in Louisiana State University's College of Music & Dramatic Arts. He teaches a film acting class. Since 1992, he is a founding member of LSU's Swine Palace.

=== Film ===
Year	Title	Role	Notes
1993	King of the Hill	Ben	
1993	The Pelican Brief	Song and Dance Man from Bar	
1995	The Underneath	Mr. Rodman	
1997	Clockwatchers	Detective	
1998	Out of Sight	Andy	
2000	Erin Brockovich	Tom Robinson	
2000	Lush	Greg	
2000	Auggie Rose	Rhineback	Uncredited
2002	Full Frontal	Sex Shop Man #1	
2002	The Ring	Doctor	
2003	Runaway Jury	Owens	
2004	The Aviator	Hell's Angels Director of Photography	
2005	The Skeleton Key	Paramedic	
2007	Ocean's Thirteen	Fender Roads' Manager	
2008	The Secret Life of Bees	Mr. Forrest	
2008	Miracle at St. Anna	MP Doyle Ellis	
2008	Who Do You Love?	Malcolm Chisholm	
2009	I Love You Phillip Morris	Steven's Dad	
2009	The Informant!	Visiting Client	
2009	The Blind Side	Clemson Coach	
2010	Welcome to the Rileys	Jerry	
2010	Louis	Tom Anderson	
2010	Red	Retirement Home Detective	
2010	Secretariat	Sports Broadcaster	
2010	Knucklehead	Child Services Inspector	
2011	Drive Angry	F***ing Passenger	
2011	Battle Los Angeles	1st Sgt. John Roy	
2011	That's What I Am	Mr. Clear	
2011	Love, Wedding, Marriage	John	
2011	Seeking Justice	Detective Rudeski	
2011	Butter	Butter Fan	
2011	Texas Killing Fields	Salter	
2011	Jeff, Who Lives at Home	Paul	
2012	21 Jump Street	David Schmidt	
2012	Battleship	JPL Controller	
2012	The Lucky One	Deputy Moore	
2012	Killing Them Softly	Business Suit Agent	
2012	On the Road	Virginia Cop	
2012	The Campaign	Rainbowland Audience	
2012	The Baytown Outlaws	ATF Agent	
2012	Playing for Keeps	Referee	
2013	The Last Exorcism Part II	Pastor	
2013	G.I. Joe: Retaliation	Chief of Staff	
2013	The Hot Flashes	Millie's Dad	
2013	Now You See Me	Elkhorn Janitor Agent	
2013	The Butler	White Usher	
2013	Oldboy	Johnny / Schizophrenic Man	
2013	Homefront	DEA Agent #1	
2014	Barefoot	Trooper	
2014	22 Jump Street	David Schmidt	
2014	Black or White	Dave	
2014	American Heist	Captain Sullivan	
2015	Focus	Jeweler	Uncredited
2015	Ant-Man	Frank	
2015	I Saw the Light	Oscar Davis	
2015	The Hunger Games: Mockingjay – Part 2	Mitchell	
2016	Showing Roots	Fuzzy Canaday	
2016	Cold Moon	Charles Darrish	
2016	Free State of Jones	James Eakins	
2016	LBJ	McGeorge Bundy	Uncredited
2016	Deepwater Horizon	Sims	
2017	Gifted	Kevin Larsen	
2018	Assassination Nation	Lawrence	
2018	The Front Runner	Ira Wyman	
2019	The Dirt	David Lee	
2019	The Perfect Date	Harvey Lieberman	
2020	The Lovebirds	Red Robe Man	
2022	Where the Crawdads Sing	Dr. Cone	
2023	Quiz Lady	Mr. Walters	
2023	Killers of the Flower Moon	Lawyer Freeling	
2024	Lisa Frankenstein	Dale Swallows	
2024	Fly Me to the Moon	Senator Vanning	

=== Television ===
Year	Title	Role	Notes
1993	Law & Order	Lt. Charles Bates	Episode: "Conduct Unbecoming"
1994	Family Matters	Officer Carmichael	Episode: "Good Cop, Bad Cop"
1994	Columbo	Mercer	Episode: "Undercover"
1994	Cries from the Heart	Brandon Richards	Television film
1995	Sweet Justice	Dylan	Episode: "Bloodlines"
1995	Kingfish: A Story of Huey P. Long	Carl Weiss	Television film
1995	Fallen Angels	Dino	Episode: "The Professional Man"
1996	The Lottery	Deputy Jeff Simmons	Television film
1996	Nash Bridges	Kevin McMillan	Episode: "The Brothers McMillan"
1996	Millennium	Raymond Dees	Episode: "5-2-2-6-6-6"
1997	Promised Land	Gary McNeely	Episode: "Downsized"
1998	Chicago Hope	Judas	Episode: "Tantric Turkey"
1999	Snoops	Joel Hilburn	Episode: "Singer in the Band"
1999	Hefner: Unauthorized	Ed Gunn	Television film
2000	Touched by an Angel	Joe	Episode: "Finger of God"
2001	Level 9	Derek Santos	Episode: "Wetware"
2004	CSI: Crime Scene Investigation	Al Maguire	Episode: "Getting Off"
2004	Deadwood	Persimmon Phil	Episode: "Deep Water"
2004	Star Trek: Enterprise	Bar Patron	Episode: "Home"
2004	3: The Dale Earnhardt Story	Jake Elder	Television film
2005	Medium	Henry Yellen	Episode: "Coded"
2005	Faith of My Fathers	Craner	Television film
2005	Surface	Rich's Friend	Episode: "Episode 5"
2006	Thief	Art Luster	Episode: "Everything That Rises Must Converge"
2007	K-Ville	Det. Ray McPherson	Episode: "Ride Along"
2008	Front of the Class	Jim Ovbey	Television film
2010	House of Bones	Benjamin	Television film
2010	One Tree Hill	Investor	Episode: "We All Fall Down"
2012	Breakout Kings	Detective Estes	2 episodes
2012	Treme	James Townsend	2 episodes
2014	Nashville	Ed Marshall	Episode: "I'll Keep Climbing"
2014	True Detective	Detective Demma	5 episodes
2016	Killing Reagan	Jerry Parr	Television film
2016–2025	Stranger Things	Ted Wheeler	23 episodes
2017	Sun Records	Vernon Presley	7 episodes
2018	Mr. Mercedes	Detective	2 episodes
2018	The Purge	Ross Bailes	3 episodes
2019	Looking for Alaska	Walter Halter	4 episodes
2020	When the Streetlights Go On	Mr. Chambers	10 episodes
2022	The First Lady	Dr. Pursh	2 episodes
2022	A Friend of the Family	Bishop Matthew Paulsen	6 episodes
2026	High Potential	Ramsey Pike	Episode: "Grounded"

=== Theatre ===
Month/Year	Venue	Title	Role	Notes
October 1986	LSU Theatre	The Rimers of Eldritch	Lanford Wilson	
May 1987	LSU Theatre	The Rose Tattoo		"In a large and energetic cast, Joe Chrest and Amanda P. White bring credibility to their small (unaccented) roles."
April 1988	LSU Theatre	Fool for Love	Martin	The cast also performed at the Kennedy Center as part of the American College Theater Festival.
December 1988	LSU Theatre	The Wild Duck	Gregers Werle	
August 2001	Theatre West Virginia	The Sound of Music	Captain von Trapp	He was also director of the play.
May 28-July 6, 2025	Mark Taper Forum	Hamlet	Detective Fortinbras/Ghost of Hamlet's father	
