= Stranger Things (franchise) =

Netflix media franchise

- Created by: The Duffer Brothers
- Original work: Stranger Things
- Owner: Netflix
- Years: 2016–present

Films and television
- Television series: Stranger Things (2016–2025); Other Worlds: A Stranger Things Adventure (forthcoming)
- Animated series: Stranger Things: Tales from '85 (2026)

Theatrical presentations
- Play: Stranger Things: The First Shadow (2023)

Games
- Video game: Stranger Things 3: The Game (2019)

Audio
- Soundtracks: Stranger Things (2016); Stranger Things 2 (2017); Stranger Things 3 (2019); Stranger Things 4 (2022); Stranger Things 5 (2026)

Miscellaneous
- Toy: Lego Stranger Things

Stranger Things is a multimedia franchise based on the American television series created by the Duffer Brothers for Netflix. The titular series, Stranger Things, debuted in July 2016, attracting record viewership and widespread critical acclaim. Set in the 1980s, the original show follows supernatural events in the fictional town of Hawkins, Indiana, United States of America. Its blend of government-lab conspiracy, child protagonists, and 1980s pop culture nostalgia has earned praise for its writing, atmosphere, ensemble cast, and homage to 1980s genre films. The original series garnered multiple award nominations (including 12 Primetime Emmy Awards) and numerous accolades.

The expanded franchise includes a stage play, two spin-off series, a line of novels and comics, several video games, and extensive licensed merchandise.

== Television series ==
Two television series make up the Stranger Things franchise: Stranger Things, and Tales from '85. All series in total amount to 60 episodes across seven seasons of television.

Series	Season	Episodes	Originally released		Showrunner(s)	Status
Series	Season	Episodes	First released	Last released	Showrunner(s)	Status
Stranger Things	1	8	July 15, 2016		Matt Duffer, Ross Duffer, and Karl Gajdusek	Concluded
Stranger Things	2	9	October 27, 2017		Matt Duffer and Ross Duffer	Concluded
Stranger Things	3	8	July 4, 2019		Matt Duffer and Ross Duffer	Concluded
Stranger Things	4	9	May 27, 2022	July 1, 2022	Matt Duffer and Ross Duffer	Concluded
Stranger Things	5	8	November 26, 2025	December 31, 2025	Matt Duffer and Ross Duffer	Concluded
Stranger Things: Tales from '85	1	10	April 23, 2026		Eric Robles	Released
Stranger Things: Tales from '85	2	8	September 17, 2026		Eric Robles	Released
Other Worlds: A Stranger Things Adventure	1	TBA	2028	TBA	Kate Trefry	In development

=== Stranger Things (2016–2025) ===
Stranger Things was created, written, and directed by the Duffer Brothers, produced in association with Shawn Levy's 21 Laps Entertainment and Duffers' Monkey Massacre Productions. The Duffers conceived the show as a blend of 1980s Spielbergian adventure and Stephen King–style horror.

The first season (set in 1983) premiered on Netflix on July 15, 2016. It introduced the disappearance of young Will Byers and the appearance of a telekinetic girl named Eleven escaping from a secretive government lab. The first season consists of eight episodes. In October 2017, Netflix released the second season, which focuses on the aftermath of Will's time spent in the alternate "Upside Down" alongside a new entity known as the Mind Flayer. The third season arrived on July 4, 2019. It is set in the summer of 1985, focusing on the heroes' battle with the Mind Flayer at the new Starcourt Mall and culminating in a dramatic confrontation that changes the town's status quo. The fourth season (split into two volumes released on May 27 and July 1, 2022) follows the group in early 1986 as the Upside Down's influence resurfaces via the new villain Vecna, even as the characters face challenges separated across multiple locations. The fifth and final season was released in three parts throughout November and December 2025.

=== Stranger Things: Tales from '85 (2026–present) ===
In July 2022, it was revealed that a spin-off series was in the works. In April 2023, Netflix greenlit a straight-to-series order for an animated series that is set in the Stranger Things universe. The animation for the series is being provided by Flying Bark Productions with Eric Robles, the Duffer Brothers, Shawn Levy and Dan Cohen as executive producers on the show. The Duffer Brothers said the series would be in the vein of the Saturday-morning cartoons they grew up with. In 2025, it was revealed that the animated spin-off will be titled Stranger Things: Tales from '85, and as the title implies, it is set in the winter of 1985, between the second and third seasons of the main series. The series will introduce a new character named Nikki Baxter who is said to be "a tinker", and who has pinkish hair that's short on the sides. On November 6, 2025, Netflix released a first look teaser for Tales from '85, also revealing its voice cast.

The first season of Tales from '85 was released in its entirety on April 23, 2026. In April 2026, the series was renewed for a second season, which premiered on September 17, 2026.

=== Other Worlds: A Stranger Things Adventure ===
A live-action spin-off of Stranger Things, separate from Tales from '85, was reported to be in development by 2023. In August 2025, main series star Finn Wolfhard described the planned spin-off as being "like David Lynch's 'Twin Peaks.' Sort of an anthology and different tones but similar universe or same universe. I think set in different places and all tied together through this mythology of the Upside Down. Don't even talk about Hawkins. Don't have any mention of our characters. They were toying around with ideas in case Netflix wanted them. I'm sure they do, and I'm sure it will happen, but there's nothing official. I think the coolest way, the way that I would do it, there has to be labs everywhere. If there was one in Hawkins, there's one in Russia. Where else could they be?".

The live-action spin-off, Other Worlds: A Stranger Things Adventure, was ordered by Netflix in November 2026. Created by the Duffers alongside Kate Trefry, the latter of whom serves as showrunner, it is set in the fictional town of Marion, Nevada, in the 1950s, and acts as a prequel to the stage play Stranger Things: The First Shadow. Other Worlds is scheduled for release in 2028.

=== Other series ===
In December 2022, reports surfaced of an anime spin-off series in development, titled Stranger Things: Tokyo, but its existence has not been addressed by Netflix or the Duffers.

== Aftershows and documentaries ==
Season	Title	Episodes	Originally released		
Season	Title	Episodes	First released	Last released	Network
2	Beyond Stranger Things	7	October 27, 2017		Netflix
3	Behind the Scenes: Stranger Things Podcast	3	July 17, 2019	July 29, 2019	Various podcast platforms
4	Stranger Things: Unlocked	2	June 9, 2022	July 9, 2022	YouTube
5	Stranger Things 5: Inside the Episodes	8	November 27, 2025	January 6, 2026	YouTube
5	One Last Adventure: The Making of Stranger Things 5	1	January 12, 2026		Netflix

=== Beyond Stranger Things (2017) ===
With the release of the second season of the series, Netflix also released Beyond Stranger Things, an aftershow hosted by Jim Rash. The guests are cast and crew from the series, including the Duffer Brothers and the series' stars, who discuss the development and production of the series and its larger mythology. Unlike previous aftershows created by Embassy Row, such as Talking Dead and Talking Bad, Beyond Stranger Things is intended to be watched after a screening of the entire second season.

No.	Title	Guests	Original release date
1	"Mind Blown"	Shawn Levy, the Duffer Brothers, Finn Wolfhard, and Millie Bobby Brown (with David Harbour)	October 27, 2017
2	"Mad for Max"	Levy, Duffer Brothers, Caleb McLaughlin, Gaten Matarazzo, and Sadie Sink	October 27, 2017
3	"Unlikely Allies"	Levy, Duffer Brothers, Matarazzo, and Joe Keery	October 27, 2017
4	"Truth in Hawkins"	Keery, Natalia Dyer, Charlie Heaton, and Brett Gelman (with Harbour and Shannon Purser)	October 27, 2017
5	"The AV Club"	McLaughlin, Matarazzo, Noah Schnapp, Randy Havens, and Bill Nye (with Sean Astin)	October 27, 2017
6	"The New Class"	Sink, Gelman, Dacre Montgomery, and Linnea Berthelsen (with Astin and Paul Reiser)	October 27, 2017
7	"Closing the Gate"	Levy, Duffer Brothers, Brown, Schnapp, and Dyer (with Harbour, Astin, and Eddie Tsang)	October 27, 2017

=== Behind the Scenes: Stranger Things Podcast (2019) ===
In July 2019, Netflix released a three-episode podcast titled Behind The Scenes: Stranger Things Podcast, hosted by Dan Taberski. The podcast explores the making of the show's third season through interviews and production insights.

No.	Title	Guests	Original release date
1	"The Starcourt Mall"	Paul Ditcher, the Duffer Brothers, Sadie Sink, Curtis Gwinn, Chris Trujillo, Jess Royal, Sean Brennan, John Snow, Amy Parris, and Sarah Hindsgaul	July 17, 2019
2	"The Red Scare"	Shawn Levy, Matt Duffer, Amy Parris	July 22, 2019
3	"The Mind Flayer"	Ross Duffer, Dacre Montgomery, and Kate Trefry	July 29, 2019

=== Stranger Things: Unlocked (2022) ===
For the fourth season, Netflix released a two-part aftershow on YouTube titled Stranger Things: Unlocked. It was hosted by Felicia Day, with the first part releasing on June 9, 2022, to accompany the season's first volume, and the second part one month later for the second volume.

No.	Title	Guests	Original release date
1	"Stranger Things 4 Vol. 1: Unlocked"	The Duffer Brothers, Winona Ryder, David Harbour, Joe Keery, Maya Hawke, Joseph Quinn, Finn Wolfhard, Gaten Matarazzo, Caleb McLaughlin, Sadie Sink and Priah Ferguson (with Millie Bobby Brown and Shawn Levy)	June 9, 2022
2	"Stranger Things 4 Vol. 2: Unlocked"	Duffer Brothers, Wolfhard, Matarazzo, McLaughlin, Sink, Ferguson, Keery, Hawke and Quinn (with Brown, Matthew Modine and Levy)	July 9, 2022

=== Stranger Things 5: Inside the Episodes (2025–2026) ===
Accompanying season five, a series of behind the scenes features were published on YouTube after the release of each volume under the title Stranger Things 5: Inside the Episodes.

No.	Episode discussed / Title (Note: Each episode is prefixed with the title "Behind the Episode".)	Guests	Original release date
1	"Chapter One: The Crawl"	The Duffer Brothers, Gaten Matarazzo, Finn Wolfhard, Millie Bobby Brown, Jamie Campbell Bower, Shawn Levy, Cara Buono, Winona Ryder, Maya Hawke, Chris Trujillo, Jess Royal, Natalia Dyer, Charlie Heaton, Joe Keery, Caleb McLaughlin, Nell Fisher, Linda Hamilton, and Noah Schnapp	November 27, 2025
2	"Chapter Two: The Vanishing of Holly Wheeler"	Buono, Duffer Brothers, Fisher, Joe Chrest, Mike Mekash, Wolfhard, Dyer, Matarazzo, McLaughlin, Keery, Hawke, Schnapp, David Harbour, and Bower	November 27, 2025
3	"Chapter Three: The Turnbow Trap"	Bower, Duffer Brothers, Fisher, Amy Parris, Frank Darabont, Harbour, Alex Breaux, Brown, Wolfhard, Jake Connelly, Priah Ferguson, Brett Gelman, JD Garcia, McLaughlin, Dyer, and Sadie Sink	November 27, 2025
4	"Chapter Four: Sorcerer"	Connelly, Hiro Koda, Keery, Sink, Duffer Brothers, Hamilton, Brown, Harbour, Sean Ames, Wolfhard, Bower, Barrie Gower, Michael Maher, Levy, and Schnapp	November 27, 2025
5	"Chapter Five: Shock Jock"	Schnapp, Duffer Brothers, Linnea Berthelsen, Brynn Berg, Brown, Connelly, Bower, Ryder, Barrie Gower, Darabont, Matarazzo, and Keery	December 26, 2025
6	"Chapter Six: Escape from Camazotz"	Duffer Brothers, Levy, Brown, Heaton, Dyer, Trujillo, Mark Hawker, Robert "Ricky Bobby" Everett, Parris, Keery, Matarazzo, Schnapp, McLaughlin, Sink, Amybeth McNulty, Hawke, and Buono	December 26, 2025
7	"Chapter Seven: The Bridge"	Duffer Brothers, Levy, McLaughlin, Sink, Hawke, Trujillo, Bower, Matarazzo, Keery, McNulty, Berthelsen, Hamilton, Parris, Schnapp, Ryder, and Gelman	December 26, 2025
8	"Chapter Eight: The Rightside Up"	Duffer Brothers, Wolfhard, Hawke, Gelman, Bower, Schnapp, Betsy Paterson, Maher, Keery, Heaton, Dyer, Matarazzo, Koda, Brown, Ryder, Barrie Gower, Chrest, Buono, Randy Havens, Ferguson, Caleb Heymann, Eryn Krueger Mekash, Berthelsen, Harbour, Sink, Levy, and McLaughlin	January 6, 2026

=== One Last Adventure: The Making of Stranger Things 5 (2026) ===
A behind-the-scenes documentary for the fifth season, titled One Last Adventure: The Making of Stranger Things 5, was released on Netflix on January 12, 2026.

Title	Guests	Original release date
One Last Adventure: The Making of Stranger Things 5	Millie Bobby Brown, Finn Wolfhard, Noah Schnapp, Gaten Matarazzo, Caleb McLaughlin, Sadie Sink, Maya Hawke, Jamie Campbell Bower, Natalia Dyer, Charlie Heaton, Joe Keery, Ross Duffer and Matt Duffer (with documentary director Martina Radwan)	January 12, 2026

== Stage play ==
=== Stranger Things: The First Shadow (2023–present) ===
In July 2022, it was revealed that a prequel stage play set in the Stranger Things universe was in development, produced by Sonia Friedman and Stephen Daldry. In March 2023, the play was officially announced as Stranger Things: The First Shadow, written by Kate Trefry. It premiered on December 14, 2023, at the Phoenix Theatre in London's West End. The production received five Olivier Award nominations and won two. In August 2024, it was announced that the play would transfer to Broadway, with previews beginning at the Marquis Theatre on March 28, 2025, and an official opening set for April 22, 2025. Both productions of the play in the West End and on Broadway announced their closing dates on June 9, 2026.

==== Behind the Curtain: Stranger Things: The First Shadow (2025) ====
A Netflix documentary titled Behind the Curtain: Stranger Things: The First Shadow premiered on April 15, 2025, offering a behind-the-scenes look at developing and staging The First Shadow. Directed by Jon Halperin and produced by Angus Wall, Kent Kubena, Terry Leonard (with Matt Bell as executive producer), the film chronicles the creative journey—and logistical hurdles—faced by the cast and crew from West End rehearsals to Broadway previews.

== Literary works ==
=== Books ===
Beginning in late 2018, Penguin Random House partnered with Netflix to publish a series of books based on Stranger Things. These include How to Survive in a Stranger Things World, a children's book released on November 13, 2018, which features advice and insights inspired by the show. Other releases include Stranger Things: Worlds Turned Upside Down: The Official Behind-the-Scenes Companion, published on October 30, 2018, and a combined Hawkins Middle School Yearbook / Hawkins High School Yearbook, released on March 26, 2019.

Several additional Stranger Things tie-in books have been released in collaboration with Netflix. Visions from the Upside Down: Stranger Things Artbook was published on October 15, 2019, followed by Will Byers: Secret Files on September 24, 2019. Stranger Things: The Official Sticker Album came out on June 15, 2021, and Stranger Things: The Official Coloring Book was released on June 28, 2022. A Little Golden Book titled Stranger Things: We Can Count on Eleven was published on July 5, 2022. A Choose Your Own Adventure-style book titled Stranger Things: Heroes and Monsters was released on April 18, 2023. A second coloring book, themed around the show's fourth season, was published on August 29, 2023. Another Little Golden Book titled Inside, Outside, Upside Down was released on July 9, 2024, with a third entry, Hawkins ABCs, releasing on July 8, 2025. Stranger Things Official Activity Book released on September 2, 2025, followed by Stranger Things: The Official Color-with-Stickers Book and Stranger Things: The Complete Coloring Book, which released on September 30, 2025. A themed cookbook, Stranger Things: The Official Cookbook – Recipes from Hawkins and Beyond by Joshua David Stein, is expected to be released on February 3, 2026.

An official Stranger Things Mad Libs book written by Gabriella DeGennaro was released on May 3, 2022. An updated edition released on September 16, 2025.

Random House published books compiling the scripts of the series, beginning with Stranger Things: The Complete Scripts – Season 1 and Season 2, released on September 2, 2025. Season 3 followed on October 7, 2025, with Season 4 released on November 4, 2025.

A Dungeons & Dragons-themed book, Stranger Things: Dungeons & Dragons: Tales from the Table by Jim Zub and Stacy King, was released exclusively at Target stores on November 4, 2025.

Another behind-scenes book, Stranger Things: The Official Story Behind the Legendary Series written by Gina McIntyre, was released exclusively at Target stores on June 20, 2026.

Insight Editions released Stranger Things Tarot Deck and Guidebook on August 16, 2022, followed by Stranger Things: The Ultimate Pop-up Book on August 30, 2022.

Thunder Bay Press released Stranger Things World of Stickers: Art Inspired by the Series, a keepsake sticker book, on September 30, 2025.

The Stranger Things Annual 2026 was released on September 30, 2025.

In the second quarter of 2019, UK publisher Obverse Books released a book of Stranger Things Season 1, written by Paul Driscoll, as part of its Silver Archive series.

Spanish publisher Monsa Publications released Stranger Things: Tribute on May 1, 2020, followed by Stranger Things: Tribute 1983/1986 on January 1, 2024. Both books feature artwork inspired by the series, with accompanying text presented in both Spanish and English.

=== Novels ===
A series of licensed novels tie into the television narrative. Key titles include:

- Stranger Things: Suspicious Minds (2019) by Gwenda Bond – A prequel novel set in 1969, focusing on Eleven's mother Terry Ives and her experiences with Dr. Brenner at the Hawkins National Laboratory. The novel was released on February 5, 2019.
- Stranger Things: Darkness on the Edge of Town by Adam Christopher – Published on May 28, 2019, this novel follows Chief Hopper as he recounts his 1977 New York past to Eleven, including his case involving missing children and his experiences after Vietnam.
- Stranger Things: Runaway Max by Brenna Yovanoff – Published on June 4, 2019, this young-adult novel details Max Mayfield's life in San Diego, California before her family's move to Hawkins in 1984.
- Stranger Things: Rebel Robin by A.R. Capetta – Published on June 29, 2021, this novel details Robin Buckley's coming-of-age and struggles with her identity as a teenager in Hawkins prior to the events of the third season.
- Stranger Things: Hawkins Horrors (2022) by Matthew J. Gilbert, a collection of short horror stories told from the perspective of the Party.
- Stranger Things: Lucas on the Line by Suyi Davies Okungbowa – Published on July 26, 2022, this novel is set after the third season and told from Lucas Sinclair's viewpoint, exploring his teenage life, social struggles, and new friendships as a young Black man in Hawkins.
- Stranger Things: Flight of Icarus by Caitlin Schneiderhan – Published on October 31, 2023, this novel depicts Eddie Munson's backstory prior to his arrival in Hawkins.
- Stranger Things: The Dustin Experiment by J.L. D'Amato – Published on October 29, 2024, this novel follows Dustin Henderson in the fall of 1985 (between the events of the third and fourth seasons). It depicts Dustin's freshman year in high school, a science competition road trip, and his adventures with new friends (including Eddie) as he copes with changes in Hawkins.
- Stranger Things: Starcourt Mall Escape (2025), a novel by Jennifer Brody which expands on Eleven and Max's story arc in the third season.
- Stranger Things: One Way or Another: A Nancy Wheeler Mystery by Caitlin Schneiderhan – Published on December 2, 2025, this novel is set two months after the events of the fourth season, focusing on Nancy and Robin investigating corruption in Hawkins.

For younger readers, Netflix Publishing has also published "junior novelizations" of the first and second seasons, alongside the full scripts for those respective seasons on July 8 and September 9, 2025.

All books are officially licensed tie-ins, published by Random House and its imprints, and expand the franchise's storyline around the main series's events.

=== Comics ===
In 2018, Dark Horse Comics announced a partnership with Netflix to publish a multi-year line of Stranger Things comics. The first release was a four-issue miniseries written by Jody Houser, with artwork by Stefano Martino. Set during the events of the first season, the story follows Will Byers' experiences while trapped in the Upside Down. The first issue was released on September 26, 2018.

On May 4, 2019, Dark Horse Comics released a special Stranger Things story titled The Game Master as part of Free Comic Book Day. Featured in the Dark Horse FCBD 2019 General issue, the story is set a few days after the events of the first season. It was written by Jody Houser and illustrated by Ibrahim Moustafa.

The second Stranger Things comic miniseries, titled Stranger Things: Six, was also written by Jody Houser, with interior art by Edgar Salazar. The four-issue series centers on Francine, a precognitive test subject who was part of the experiments that preceded Eleven. The first issue was released on May 29, 2019.

An original graphic novel titled Stranger Things: Zombie Boys was released on February 19, 2020. Written by Greg Pak and illustrated by Valeria Favoccia, with colors by Dan Jackson, letters by Nate Piekos of Blambot, and cover art by Ron Chan, the 72-page story is set shortly after the events of the first season.

A third comic miniseries, Stranger Things: Into the Fire, began publication in January 2020. Also consisting of four issues, the series serves as a sequel to Stranger Things: Six and is set before the events of the third season. It was written by Jody Houser, with pencils by Ryan Kelly and inks by Le Beau Underwood.

Another Stranger Things one-shot was released as part of Free Comic Book Day 2020. Written by Greg Pak, the story is set shortly after the Battle of Starcourt Mall, following the events of the third season.

A second original graphic novel, Stranger Things: The Bully, was released on October 13, 2020. Written by Greg Pak and illustrated by Valeria Favoccia, the story follows Troy and James during the events of the second season, with a focus on Troy's struggle with PTSD after his encounter with Eleven.

On June 18, 2020, it was announced that IDW Publishing and Dark Horse Comics would co-publish a crossover miniseries titled Stranger Things and Dungeons & Dragons.

A fourth miniseries from Dark Horse Comics, titled Stranger Things: Science Camp, began in September 2020 and ran for four issues. On July 23, 2020, Dark Horse also announced a prequel one-shot titled Stranger Things: Halloween in Hawkins.

A third original graphic novel, Stranger Things: Erica the Great!, was released on January 26, 2022.

In April 2023, Dark Horse Comics and IDW Publishing announced a crossover miniseries featuring Stranger Things and Teenage Mutant Ninja Turtles.

Issue	Release Date	Story	Art	Colors	Cover	Collection
#1	September 26, 2018	Jody Houser	Pencils: Stefano Martino; Inks: Keith Champagne	Lauren Affe	Aleksi Briclot; Rafael Albuquerque (variant); Kyle Lambert (variant); Patrick Satterfield (photo variant); Lee Bermejo (variant); Ben Oliver (variant); Babs Tarr (variant); Clayton Crain (variant); Lucio Parrillo (variant); Francesco Mattina (variant); Fábio Moon (variant); Patric Reynolds (variant)	Stranger Things Volume 1: The Other Side; Release date: May 7, 2019; 978-1-5067-0976-5 also collected in Stranger Things: Library Edition Volume 1 Release date: September 8, 2021; 978-1-5067-2762-2 and Stranger Things Omnibus Volume 1 Release date: October 11, 2022; 978-1-5067-2764-6
#2	October 31, 2018	Jody Houser	Pencils: Stefano Martino; Inks: Keith Champagne	Lauren Affe	Aleksi Briclot; Steve Morris (variant); Greg Ruth (variant); Patrick Satterfield (photo variant)	Stranger Things Volume 1: The Other Side; Release date: May 7, 2019; 978-1-5067-0976-5 also collected in Stranger Things: Library Edition Volume 1 Release date: September 8, 2021; 978-1-5067-2762-2 and Stranger Things Omnibus Volume 1 Release date: October 11, 2022; 978-1-5067-2764-6
#3	November 28, 2018	Jody Houser	Pencils: Stefano Martino; Inks: Keith Champagne	Lauren Affe	Aleksi Briclot; Grzegorz Domaradzki (variant); Matthew Taylor (variant); Patrick Satterfield (photo variant)	Stranger Things Volume 1: The Other Side; Release date: May 7, 2019; 978-1-5067-0976-5 also collected in Stranger Things: Library Edition Volume 1 Release date: September 8, 2021; 978-1-5067-2762-2 and Stranger Things Omnibus Volume 1 Release date: October 11, 2022; 978-1-5067-2764-6
#4	January 2, 2019	Jody Houser	Pencils: Stefano Martino; Inks: Keith Champagne	Lauren Affe	Aleksi Briclot; Jen Bartel (variant); Ethan Young (variant); Patrick Satterfield (photo variant)	Stranger Things Volume 1: The Other Side; Release date: May 7, 2019; 978-1-5067-0976-5 also collected in Stranger Things: Library Edition Volume 1 Release date: September 8, 2021; 978-1-5067-2762-2 and Stranger Things Omnibus Volume 1 Release date: October 11, 2022; 978-1-5067-2764-6
Free Comic Book Day 2019 (General) Stranger Things/Black Hammer (Stranger Things story: The Game Master)	May 8, 2019	Jody Houser	Ibrahim Moustafa	Triona Farrell	Chun Lo	Stranger Things: Library Edition Volume 1 Release date: September 8, 2021; 978-1-5067-2762-2 also collected in Stranger Things Omnibus Volume 1 Release date: October 11, 2022; 978-1-5067-2764-6
SIX #1	May 29, 2019	Jody Houser	Pencils: Edgar Salazar; Inks: Keith Champagne	Marissa Louise	Aleksi Briclot; Kyle Lambert (variant); David Mack (variant); Patrick Satterfield (photo variant); Jenny Frison (variant)	Stranger Things Volume 2: SIX; Release date: November 26, 2019; 978-1-5067-1232-1 also collected in Stranger Things Library Edition Volume 2 Release date: November 10, 2021; 978-1-5067-2763-9 and Stranger Things Omnibus Volume 1 Release date: October 11, 2022; 978-1-5067-2764-6
SIX #2	June 26, 2019	Jody Houser	Pencils: Edgar Salazar; Inks: Keith Champagne	Marissa Louise	Aleksi Briclot; E.M. Gist (variant); Micaela Dawn (variant); Patrick Satterfield (photo variant)	Stranger Things Volume 2: SIX; Release date: November 26, 2019; 978-1-5067-1232-1 also collected in Stranger Things Library Edition Volume 2 Release date: November 10, 2021; 978-1-5067-2763-9 and Stranger Things Omnibus Volume 1 Release date: October 11, 2022; 978-1-5067-2764-6
SIX #3	July 31, 2019	Jody Houser	Pencils: Edgar Salazar; Inks: Keith Champagne	Marissa Louise	Aleksi Briclot; Casper Wijngaard (variant); Tyler Crook (variant); Patrick Satterfield (photo variant)	Stranger Things Volume 2: SIX; Release date: November 26, 2019; 978-1-5067-1232-1 also collected in Stranger Things Library Edition Volume 2 Release date: November 10, 2021; 978-1-5067-2763-9 and Stranger Things Omnibus Volume 1 Release date: October 11, 2022; 978-1-5067-2764-6
SIX #4	August 28, 2019	Jody Houser	Pencils: Edgar Salazar; Inks: Keith Champagne	Marissa Louise	Aleksi Briclot; Christian Ward (variant); Jenn Ravenna (variant); Patrick Satterfield (photo variant)	Stranger Things Volume 2: SIX; Release date: November 26, 2019; 978-1-5067-1232-1 also collected in Stranger Things Library Edition Volume 2 Release date: November 10, 2021; 978-1-5067-2763-9 and Stranger Things Omnibus Volume 1 Release date: October 11, 2022; 978-1-5067-2764-6
Zombie Boys	January 22, 2020	Greg Pak	Valeria Favoccia	Dan Jackson	Ron Chan	Original Graphic Novel 978-1-5067-1309-0 also collected in Stranger Things: Afterschool Adventures Omnibus; Release date: October 18, 2022; 978-1-5067-2773-8
Into the Fire #1	January 20, 2020	Jody Houser	Pencils: Ryan Kelly; Inks: Le Beau Underwood	Triona Farrell	Viktor Kalvachev; Jeremy Wilson (variant); Kyle Lambert (variant)	Stranger Things Volume 3: Into the Fire; Release date: July 28, 2020; 978-1-5067-1308-3 also collected in Stranger Things Library Edition Volume 2 Release date: November 10, 2021; 978-1-5067-2763-9 and Stranger Things Omnibus Volume 1 Release date: October 11, 2022; 978-1-5067-2764-6
Into the Fire #2	February 12, 2020	Jody Houser	Pencils: Ryan Kelly; Inks: Le Beau Underwood	Triona Farrell	Viktor Kalvachev; Jonathan Case (variant); Claire Roe (variant)	Stranger Things Volume 3: Into the Fire; Release date: July 28, 2020; 978-1-5067-1308-3 also collected in Stranger Things Library Edition Volume 2 Release date: November 10, 2021; 978-1-5067-2763-9 and Stranger Things Omnibus Volume 1 Release date: October 11, 2022; 978-1-5067-2764-6
Into the Fire #3	March 25, 2020	Jody Houser	Pencils: Ryan Kelly; Inks: Le Beau Underwood	Triona Farrell	Viktor Kalvachev; Emily Pearson (variant); Adam Gorham (variant)	Stranger Things Volume 3: Into the Fire; Release date: July 28, 2020; 978-1-5067-1308-3 also collected in Stranger Things Library Edition Volume 2 Release date: November 10, 2021; 978-1-5067-2763-9 and Stranger Things Omnibus Volume 1 Release date: October 11, 2022; 978-1-5067-2764-6
Into the Fire #4	July 8, 2020	Jody Houser	Pencils: Ryan Kelly; Inks: Le Beau Underwood	Triona Farrell	Viktor Kalvachev; Evan Cagle (variant); Kelly McKernan (variant)	Stranger Things Volume 3: Into the Fire; Release date: July 28, 2020; 978-1-5067-1308-3 also collected in Stranger Things Library Edition Volume 2 Release date: November 10, 2021; 978-1-5067-2763-9 and Stranger Things Omnibus Volume 1 Release date: October 11, 2022; 978-1-5067-2764-6
Free Comic Book Day 2020 (All Ages) Stranger Things/Minecraft (Stranger Things story: Erica's Quest)	July 29, 2020	Greg Pak	Gabriella Antali	Dan Jackson	Ron Chan	Stranger Things Volume 4: Science Camp; Release date: May 5, 2021; 978-1-5067-1576-6 also collected in Stranger Things: Library Edition Volume 1 Release date: September 8, 2021; 978-1-5067-2762-2 and Stranger Things Omnibus Volume 1 Release date: October 11, 2022; 978-1-5067-2764-6
The Bully	September 1, 2020	Greg Pak	Valeria Favoccia	Dan Jackson	Ron Chan	Original Graphic Novel 978-1-5067-1453-0 also collected in Stranger Things: Afterschool Adventures Omnibus; Release date: October 18, 2022; 978-1-5067-2773-8
Science Camp #1	September 30, 2020	Jody Houser	Pencils: Edgar Salazar; Inks: Keith Champagne	Marissa Louise	Viktor Kalvachev; Kyle Lambert (variant); Francisco Ruiz (variant)	Stranger Things Volume 4: Science Camp; Release date: May 5, 2021; 978-1-5067-1576-6 also collected in Stranger Things: Library Edition Volume 1 Release date: September 8, 2021; 978-1-5067-2762-2 and Stranger Things Omnibus Volume 1 Release date: October 11, 2022; 978-1-5067-2764-6
Science Camp #2	October 28, 2020	Jody Houser	Pencils: Edgar Salazar; Inks: Keith Champagne	Marissa Louise	Viktor Kalvachev; Eric Nguyen (variant); Tula Lotay and/or Raúl Allén (variant)	Stranger Things Volume 4: Science Camp; Release date: May 5, 2021; 978-1-5067-1576-6 also collected in Stranger Things: Library Edition Volume 1 Release date: September 8, 2021; 978-1-5067-2762-2 and Stranger Things Omnibus Volume 1 Release date: October 11, 2022; 978-1-5067-2764-6
Science Camp #3	November 25, 2020	Jody Houser	Pencils: Edgar Salazar; Inks: Keith Champagne	Marissa Louise	Viktor Kalvachev and Raúl Allén (variant); Pius Bak (variant)	Stranger Things Volume 4: Science Camp; Release date: May 5, 2021; 978-1-5067-1576-6 also collected in Stranger Things: Library Edition Volume 1 Release date: September 8, 2021; 978-1-5067-2762-2 and Stranger Things Omnibus Volume 1 Release date: October 11, 2022; 978-1-5067-2764-6
Science Camp #4	December 30, 2020	Jody Houser	Pencils: Edgar Salazar; Inks: Keith Champagne	Marissa Louise	Viktor Kalvachev; Sebastian Piriz (variant); Pius Bak (variant)	Stranger Things Volume 4: Science Camp; Release date: May 5, 2021; 978-1-5067-1576-6 also collected in Stranger Things: Library Edition Volume 1 Release date: September 8, 2021; 978-1-5067-2762-2 and Stranger Things Omnibus Volume 1 Release date: October 11, 2022; 978-1-5067-2764-6
Halloween in Hawkins (Halloween Special one-shot)	October 21, 2020	Michael Moreci	Todor Hristov	Chris O'Halloran	Francesco Francavilla	Stranger Things Holiday Specials; Release date: November 23, 2022; 978-1-5067-3458-3 also collected in Stranger Things Library Edition Volume 3 Release date: October 24, 2023; 978-1-5067-3702-7 and Stranger Things Omnibus Volume 2 Release date: October 7, 2025; 1-5067-5290-X
Stranger Things and Dungeons & Dragons #1	November 4, 2020	Jody Houser; Jim Zub	Diego Galindo	Michele Assarasakorn	E.M. Gist; Diego Galindo (variant); Anna Dittmann (variant); David Michael Beck (variant)	Stranger Things and Dungeons & Dragons; Release date: June 30, 2021; 978-1-5067-2107-1
Stranger Things and Dungeons & Dragons #2	December 2, 2020	Jody Houser; Jim Zub	Diego Galindo	Michele Assarasakorn	E.M. Gist; Anna Dittmann (variant); David Michael Beck (variant); Max Dunbar (variant)	Stranger Things and Dungeons & Dragons; Release date: June 30, 2021; 978-1-5067-2107-1
Stranger Things and Dungeons & Dragons #3	January 6, 2021	Jody Houser; Jim Zub	Diego Galindo	Michele Assarasakorn	Anna Dittmann (Variant Cover); David Michael Beck (Variant Cover); Toni Infante (Variant Cover); E. M. Gist (Cover)	Stranger Things and Dungeons & Dragons; Release date: June 30, 2021; 978-1-5067-2107-1
Stranger Things and Dungeons & Dragons #4	February 17, 2021	Jody Houser; Jim Zub	Diego Galindo	Michele Assarasakorn	E.M. Gist; Anna Dittmann (Variant Cover); David Michael Beck (Variant Cover); Jess Taylor (Variant Cover)	Stranger Things and Dungeons & Dragons; Release date: June 30, 2021; 978-1-5067-2107-1
Tomb of Ybwen #1	September 29, 2021	Greg Pak	Diego Galindo	Francesco Segala	Marc Aspinall; Kyle Lambert (variant); Diego Galindo (variant); Irvin Rodriguez (variant)	Stranger Things Volume 5: The Tomb of Ybwen; Release date: April 27, 2022; 978-1-5067-2554-3 also collected in Stranger Things Library Edition Volume 3 Release date: October 24, 2023; 978-1-5067-3702-7 and Stranger Things Omnibus Volume 2 Release date: October 7, 2025; 1-5067-5290-X
Tomb of Ybwen #2	October 27, 2021	Greg Pak	Diego Galindo	Francesco Segala	Marc Aspinall; Caspar Wijngaard (variant); Pius Bak (variant); Rafael Sarmento (variant)	Stranger Things Volume 5: The Tomb of Ybwen; Release date: April 27, 2022; 978-1-5067-2554-3 also collected in Stranger Things Library Edition Volume 3 Release date: October 24, 2023; 978-1-5067-3702-7 and Stranger Things Omnibus Volume 2 Release date: October 7, 2025; 1-5067-5290-X
Tomb of Ybwen #3	November 24, 2021	Greg Pak	Diego Galindo	Francesco Segala	Marc Aspinall; Ben Dewey (variant); Ethan Young (variant); Todor Hristov (variant)	Stranger Things Volume 5: The Tomb of Ybwen; Release date: April 27, 2022; 978-1-5067-2554-3 also collected in Stranger Things Library Edition Volume 3 Release date: October 24, 2023; 978-1-5067-3702-7 and Stranger Things Omnibus Volume 2 Release date: October 7, 2025; 1-5067-5290-X
Tomb of Ybwen #4	December 22, 2021	Greg Pak	Diego Galindo	Francesco Segala	Marc Aspinall; Simone De Meo (variant); Mack Chater (variant); Adam Gorham (variant)	Stranger Things Volume 5: The Tomb of Ybwen; Release date: April 27, 2022; 978-1-5067-2554-3 also collected in Stranger Things Library Edition Volume 3 Release date: October 24, 2023; 978-1-5067-3702-7 and Stranger Things Omnibus Volume 2 Release date: October 7, 2025; 1-5067-5290-X
Stranger Things Winter Special (one-shot)	November 3, 2021	Chris Roberson	ABEL	DJ Chavis	Steve Morris; Jonathan Case (variant)	Stranger Things Holiday Specials; Release date: November 23, 2022; 978-1-5067-3458-3 also collected in Stranger Things Library Edition Volume 3 Release date: October 24, 2023; 978-1-5067-3702-7 and Stranger Things Omnibus Volume 2 Release date: October 7, 2025; 1-5067-5290-X
Erica the Great!	January 26, 2022	Greg Pak; Danny Lore	Valeria Favoccia	Dan Jackson	Ron Chan	Original Graphic Novel 978-1-5067-1454-7 also collected in Stranger Things: Afterschool Adventures Omnibus; Release date: October 18, 2022; 978-1-5067-2773-8
Kamchatka #1	March 23, 2022	Michael Moreci	Todor Hristov	Dan Jackson	Marc Aspinall; Elizabeth Beals (variant); Hayden Sherman (variant); Rafael Albuquerque (variant)	Stranger Things Volume 6: Kamchatka (Graphic Novel); Release date: November 8, 2022; 978-1-5067-2765-3 also collected in Stranger Things Library Edition Volume 4 Release date: March 25, 2025; 978-1-5067-4735-4 and Stranger Things Omnibus Volume 2 Release date: October 7, 2025; 1-5067-5290-X
Kamchatka #2	April 20, 2022	Michael Moreci	Todor Hristov	Dan Jackson	Marc Aspinall; Alex Hanukafast (variant); CoupleofKooks (variant); Katerina Belikova (variant)	Stranger Things Volume 6: Kamchatka (Graphic Novel); Release date: November 8, 2022; 978-1-5067-2765-3 also collected in Stranger Things Library Edition Volume 4 Release date: March 25, 2025; 978-1-5067-4735-4 and Stranger Things Omnibus Volume 2 Release date: October 7, 2025; 1-5067-5290-X
Kamchatka #3	May 25, 2022	Michael Moreci	Todor Hristov	Dan Jackson	Marc Aspinall; Ashley Witter (variant); Diego Galindo (variant); Julie Dillon (variant)	Stranger Things Volume 6: Kamchatka (Graphic Novel); Release date: November 8, 2022; 978-1-5067-2765-3 also collected in Stranger Things Library Edition Volume 4 Release date: March 25, 2025; 978-1-5067-4735-4 and Stranger Things Omnibus Volume 2 Release date: October 7, 2025; 1-5067-5290-X
Kamchatka #4	June 22, 2022	Michael Moreci	Todor Hristov	Dan Jackson	Marc Aspinall; Jacob Philips (variant); Micaela Dawn (variant); Pius Bak	Stranger Things Volume 6: Kamchatka (Graphic Novel); Release date: November 8, 2022; 978-1-5067-2765-3 also collected in Stranger Things Library Edition Volume 4 Release date: March 25, 2025; 978-1-5067-4735-4 and Stranger Things Omnibus Volume 2 Release date: October 7, 2025; 1-5067-5290-X
Free Comic Book Day 2022 (General) Stranger Things/Resident Alien (Stranger Things story: Creature Feature)	May 7, 2022	Michael Moreci	Pius Bak	Dan Jackson	Diego Galindo	—N/a
Stranger Things Summer Special (one-shot)	July 6, 2022	Keith Champagne	Caio Filipe	Dan Jackson	Diego Galindo; Heather Vaughn (variant)	Stranger Things Holiday Specials; Release date: November 23, 2022; 978-1-5067-3458-3 also collected in Stranger Things Library Edition Volume 3 Release date: October 24, 2023; 978-1-5067-3702-7 and Stranger Things Omnibus Volume 2 Release date: October 7, 2025; 1-5067-5290-X
Tales from Hawkins #1	February 8, 2023	Jody Houser	Caio Filipe	Dan Jackson	Marc Aspinall; Danny Luckert (variant); Kyle Lambert (variant); Diego Galindo (variant)	Stranger Things Volume 8: Tales from Hawkins (Graphic Novel); Release date: January 16, 2024; 978-1-5067-2767-7
Tales from Hawkins #2	May 10, 2023	Jody Houser	Sunando C	Dan Jackson	Marc Aspinall; Brent Schoonover (variant); Sebastian Piriz (variant); Todor Hristov (variant)	Stranger Things Volume 8: Tales from Hawkins (Graphic Novel); Release date: January 16, 2024; 978-1-5067-2767-7
Tales from Hawkins #3	August 23, 2023	Jody Houser	Sunando C	Dan Jackson	Marc Aspinall; Keyla Valerio (variant); Liana Kangas (variant); Liana Kangas (variant)	Stranger Things Volume 8: Tales from Hawkins (Graphic Novel); Release date: January 16, 2024; 978-1-5067-2767-7
Tales from Hawkins #4	September 6, 2023	Jody Houser	Nil Vendrell Pallach	Dan Jackson	Marc Aspinall; Eric Nguyen (variant); Ethan Young (variant); Adam Gorham (variant)	Stranger Things Volume 8: Tales from Hawkins (Graphic Novel); Release date: January 16, 2024; 978-1-5067-2767-7
Teenage Mutant Ninja Turtles x Stranger Things #1	July 12, 2023	Cameron Chittock	Fero Pe	Sofie Dodgson	Fero Pe (Cover A); Jorge Corona (Cover B); Jenn Woodall (Cover C); Adam Gorham (Cover D); Rafael Albuquerque (50 copy and 100 copy retailer incentive variants); Daniel Warren Johnson (500 copy retailer incentive variant)	Teenage Mutant Ninja Turtles x Stranger Things (Graphic Novel); Release date: April 4, 2024; 979-8-88724-080-0
Teenage Mutant Ninja Turtles x Stranger Things #2	August 23, 2023	Cameron Chittock	Fero Pe	Sofie Dodgson	Fero Pe (Cover A); Jorge Corona (Cover B); Jenn Woodall (Cover C); Adam Gorham (Cover D)	Teenage Mutant Ninja Turtles x Stranger Things (Graphic Novel); Release date: April 4, 2024; 979-8-88724-080-0
Teenage Mutant Ninja Turtles x Stranger Things #3	September 20, 2023	Cameron Chittock	Fero Pe	Sofie Dodgson	Fero Pe (Cover A); Jorge Corona (Cover B); Jenn Woodall (Cover C); Adam Gorham (Cover D)	Teenage Mutant Ninja Turtles x Stranger Things (Graphic Novel); Release date: April 4, 2024; 979-8-88724-080-0
Teenage Mutant Ninja Turtles x Stranger Things #4	October 18, 2023	Cameron Chittock	Fero Pe	Sofie Dodgson	Fero Pe (Cover A); Jorge Corona (Cover B); Jenn Woodall (Cover C); Adam Gorham (Cover D)	Teenage Mutant Ninja Turtles x Stranger Things (Graphic Novel); Release date: April 4, 2024; 979-8-88724-080-0
The Voyage #1	November 1, 2023	Michael Moreci	Todor Hristov	Francesco Segala	Marc Aspinall (main cover); Kyle Lambert (variant cover); Diego Galindo (variant cover); Todor Hristov (variant cover)	Stranger Things: The Voyage (Graphic Novel); Release date: July 16, 2024; 978-1-5067-2768-4 also collected in Stranger Things Library Edition Volume 4 Release date: March 25, 2025; 978-1-5067-4735-4 and Stranger Things Omnibus Volume 2 Release date: October 7, 2025; 1-5067-5290-X
The Voyage #2	December 6, 2023	Michael Moreci	Todor Hristov	Francesco Segala	Marc Aspinall (main cover); Danny Luckert (variant cover); Lucas Peverill (variant cover); Todor Hristov (variant cover)	Stranger Things: The Voyage (Graphic Novel); Release date: July 16, 2024; 978-1-5067-2768-4 also collected in Stranger Things Library Edition Volume 4 Release date: March 25, 2025; 978-1-5067-4735-4 and Stranger Things Omnibus Volume 2 Release date: October 7, 2025; 1-5067-5290-X
The Voyage #3	January 17, 2024	Michael Moreci	Todor Hristov	Francesco Segala	Marc Aspinall (main cover); Keyla Valerio (variant cover); Mack Chater (variant cover); Todor Hristov (variant cover)	Stranger Things: The Voyage (Graphic Novel); Release date: July 16, 2024; 978-1-5067-2768-4 also collected in Stranger Things Library Edition Volume 4 Release date: March 25, 2025; 978-1-5067-4735-4 and Stranger Things Omnibus Volume 2 Release date: October 7, 2025; 1-5067-5290-X
The Voyage #4	February 28, 2024	Michael Moreci	Todor Hristov	Francesco Segala	Marc Aspinall (main cover); Alejandro Barrionuevo (variant cover); DaNi (variant cover); Todor Hristov (variant cover)	Stranger Things: The Voyage (Graphic Novel); Release date: July 16, 2024; 978-1-5067-2768-4 also collected in Stranger Things Library Edition Volume 4 Release date: March 25, 2025; 978-1-5067-4735-4 and Stranger Things Omnibus Volume 2 Release date: October 7, 2025; 1-5067-5290-X
Free Comic Book Day 2024 (General) Hellboy/Stranger Things (Stranger Things story: Deliver Me from Evil)	May 4, 2024	Derek Fridolfs	Jonathan Case	Jonathan Case	Mike Mignola	—N/a
Stranger Things x Dungeons & Dragons: The Rise of Hellfire #1	February 19, 2025	Jody Houser; Eric Campbell	Diego Galindo	Diana Sousa	Magali Villanueve (main cover); Jeremy Wilson (variant cover); Kyle Lambert (variant cover); Nimit Malavia (variant cover); Rebeca Pueblar (variant cover)	Stranger Things and Dungeons & Dragons: The Rise of Hellfire (Graphic Novel); Release date: September 30, 2025; 1-5067-3712-9
Stranger Things x Dungeons & Dragons: The Rise of Hellfire #2	April 2, 2025	Jody Houser; Eric Campbell	Diego Galindo	Diana Sousa	Myles Wohl (main cover); Gax (variant cover); Jeremy Wilson (variant cover); Lauren Knight (variant)	Stranger Things and Dungeons & Dragons: The Rise of Hellfire (Graphic Novel); Release date: September 30, 2025; 1-5067-3712-9
Stranger Things x Dungeons & Dragons: The Rise of Hellfire #3	May 28, 2025	Jody Houser; Eric Campbell	Diego Galindo	Diana Sousa	Myles Wohl (main cover); Elizebeth Beals (variant cover); Jeremy Wilson (variant cover); Uzuri (cover)	Stranger Things and Dungeons & Dragons: The Rise of Hellfire (Graphic Novel); Release date: September 30, 2025; 1-5067-3712-9
Stranger Things x Dungeons & Dragons: The Rise of Hellfire #4	June 18, 2025	Jody Houser; Eric Campbell	Diego Galindo	Diana Sousa	Myles Wohl (main cover); Daniel IriZarri (variant cover); Jeremy Wilson (variant cover); Sebastian Piriz (variant cover)	Stranger Things and Dungeons & Dragons: The Rise of Hellfire (Graphic Novel); Release date: September 30, 2025; 1-5067-3712-9
Stranger Things: Tales from Hawkins 2 #1	June 25, 2025	Derek Fridolfs	Sunando C	Dan Jackson	Diego Galindo (main cover); Ben Turner (variant cover); Mack Chater (variant cover); Vincenzo Riccardi (variant cover)	TBA
Stranger Things: Tales from Hawkins 2 #2	August 6, 2025	Derek Fridolfs	Bradley Clayton	Dan Jackson	Diego Galindo (main cover); Caitlin Yarsky (variant cover)	TBA
Stranger Things: Tales from Hawkins 2 #3	September 3, 2025	Derek Fridolfs	Mack Chater	Dan Jackson	Diego Galindo (main cover); Skylar Patridge (variant cover)	TBA
Stranger Things: Tales from Hawkins 2 #4	October 10, 2025	Derek Fridolfs	Vincenzo Riccardi	Vincenzo Riccardi	Diego Galindo (main cover); Kyle Lambert (variant cover)	TBA
The Many Ghosts of Dr. Brenner #1	TBA (Originally planned for January 11, 2023)	Brenden Fletcher	Mack Chater	Rosh	Marc Aspinall; Kyle Lambert (variant); Diego Galindo (variant); Malachi Ward (variant)	TBA
The Many Ghosts of Dr. Brenner #2	TBA	Brenden Fletcher	Mack Chater	Rosh	TBA	TBA
The Many Ghosts of Dr. Brenner #3	TBA	Brenden Fletcher	Mack Chater	Rosh	TBA	TBA
The Many Ghosts of Dr. Brenner #4	TBA	Brenden Fletcher	Mack Chater	Rosh	TBA	TBA

==== Collected editions ====
Title	Material collected	Publication date	ISBN
Stranger Things: Library Edition Volume 1 (hardcover)	Stranger Things (a.k.a. "The Other Side") #1–4; Stranger Things: Science Camp #1–4 "The Game Master" (from Free Comic Book Day 2019 (General) Stranger Things/Black Hammer) "Erica's Quest" (from Free Comic Book Day 2020 (All Ages) Stranger Things/Minecraft)	September 8, 2021	978-1-5067-2762-2
Stranger Things Library Edition Volume 2 (hardcover)	Stranger Things: Six #1–4; Stranger Things: Into the Fire #1-4	November 10, 2021	978-1-5067-2763-9
Stranger Things Library Edition Volume 3 (hardcover)	Stranger Things: The Tomb of Ybwen #1–4; Stranger Things: Halloween Special; Stranger Things: Winter Special; Stranger Things: Summer Special	October 24, 2023	978-1-5067-3702-7
Stranger Things Library Edition Volume 4 (hardcover)	Stranger Things: Kamchatka #1-4; Stranger Things: The Voyage #1-4	March 25, 2025	978-1-5067-4735-4
Stranger Things Omnibus Volume 1 (softcover)	Stranger Things (a.k.a. "The Other Side") #1–4; Stranger Things: Six #1–4; Stranger Things: Into the Fire #1-4; Stranger Things: Science Camp #1–4 "The Game Master" (from Free Comic Book Day 2019 (General) Stranger Things/Black Hammer) "Erica's Quest" (from Free Comic Book Day 2020 (All Ages) Stranger Things/Minecraft)	October 11, 2022	978-1-5067-2764-6
Stranger Things Omnibus Volume 2 (soft cover)	Stranger Things: The Voyage #1-4; Stranger Things: Kamchatka #1-4; Stranger Things: Tomb of Ybwen #1-4; Stranger Things: Halloween Special; Stranger Things: Winter Special; Stranger Things: Summer Special	October 7, 2025	1-5067-5290-X
Stranger Things: Afterschool Adventures Omnibus (softcover)	Stranger Things: Zombie Boys; Stranger Things: The Bully; Stranger Things: Erica The Great	October 18, 2022	978-1-5067-2773-8

== Games ==
=== Mobile games ===
Stranger Things: The Game, also known as Stranger Things: 1984, is a free mobile game developed by BonusXP in collaboration with Netflix. It was released for iOS and Android devices on October 4, 2017. The game features retro-style pixel art reminiscent of Super Nintendo-era titles and is loosely based on the events following the first season. Players begin as Chief Jim Hopper and can unlock additional characters—each with unique abilities—as the game progresses.

BonusXP had under a year to develop the game and chose a gameplay style inspired by The Legend of Zelda, citing similarities in exploration and tone between the two franchises. The in-game map of Hawkins was based on Google Street View imagery of Jackson, Georgia, where the show is filmed. To maintain secrecy, the development team avoided hiring outside testers, instead relying on feedback from family members, which contributed to the game's two difficulty settings.

Completing the game rewards players with a clip from the first episode of the second season. Within its first week, the game was downloaded over 3 million times, becoming one of the top mobile downloads and receiving positive reviews from critics. Following the release of season two, an update added Max as a playable character and introduced support for Amazon Fire TV, including controller compatibility. The game was nominated for "Mobile Game" at the 14th British Academy Games Awards.

A second mobile game developed by BonusXP, Stranger Things 3: The Game, was announced during The Game Awards 2018 and released on July 4, 2019, as a tie-in to the show's third season. The game features isometric action gameplay, allowing players to control characters such as Joyce, Hopper, Max, and Eleven through various levels inspired by 1980s video games. While closely following the narrative of season three, the game also includes additional story content developed in collaboration with the Duffer Brothers. Unlike the first game, it was released on multiple platforms, including iOS, Android, PC, Nintendo Switch, PlayStation 4, and Xbox One.

Both Stranger Things: The Game and Stranger Things 3: The Game were among the launch titles for Netflix's mobile gaming service, which debuted in November 2021.

A third mobile game, titled Stranger Things: Puzzle Tales, was developed by Next Games. Initially announced as a location-based role-playing game, it was instead released in 2021 as a story-driven puzzle role-playing game.

=== VR games ===
Sony Interactive Entertainment announced a Stranger Things game for PlayStation VR, exclusive to PlayStation 4. A teaser trailer featured the iconic Christmas lights scene from the first season. The game, titled Stranger Things: The VR Experience, was released on December 12, 2017.

A separate, episodic VR game titled Stranger Things VR, developed and published by Tender Claws, was released across major virtual reality platforms beginning on February 22, 2024.

=== Cancelled Telltale game ===
In June 2018, Netflix announced a partnership with Telltale Games to develop an episodic adventure game based on Stranger Things, alongside plans to adapt other Telltale titles into interactive experiences for the Netflix platform. The Stranger Things game was intended to be set in the spring of 1985, bridging the gap between the second and third seasons of the series. However, the project was cancelled after Telltale Games laid off the majority of its staff in September 2018. A companion title, Kids Next Door, which was being developed by Night School Studio as a narrative precursor, was also cancelled following Telltale's closure.

=== Tabletop games ===
In May 2019, Hasbro released a licensed Stranger Things-themed Dungeons & Dragons starter set. The kit includes rulebooks, character sheets, dice, and a campaign titled The Hunt for the Thessalhydra, which is based on the adventure played by the characters in the show's first season. The set also features Demogorgon miniatures and is presented as though written by the character Mike Wheeler.

In 2021, Magic: The Gathering introduced a set of Stranger Things-themed crossover cards as part of its limited-edition Secret Lair series.

=== Collaborations ===
In 2021, Roblox, an online gaming platform, collaborated with Netflix to release an experience called Stranger Things: Starcourt Mall. In this experience, players have the opportunity to compete in mini-games based on the show and complete quests to earn rewards that could be used on the Roblox avatar.

In 2025, Microsoft Flight Simulator 2024 released an update which included 5 different Stranger Things related missions led by Murray Bauman, and a recreation of Hawkins, which includes more than 40 locations.

== Other media ==
=== Podcasts ===
A six-episode scripted podcast companion to the Rebel Robin novel, entitled Rebel Robin: Surviving Hawkins, was released in mid-2021. Maya Hawke reprises her role as Robin, Sean Maher plays her favorite teacher Mr. Hauser, and Lauren Shippen writes and directs.

=== Stranger Things Store ===
Starting in November 2021, Netflix has opened pop-up Stranger Things Stores, which blend both retail and immersive experiences, in several cities. As of January 2024, the locations in New York City, Chicago, Paris, Miami, Dallas, and Las Vegas had closed, with one location in São Paulo open.

=== Stranger Things Experience ===
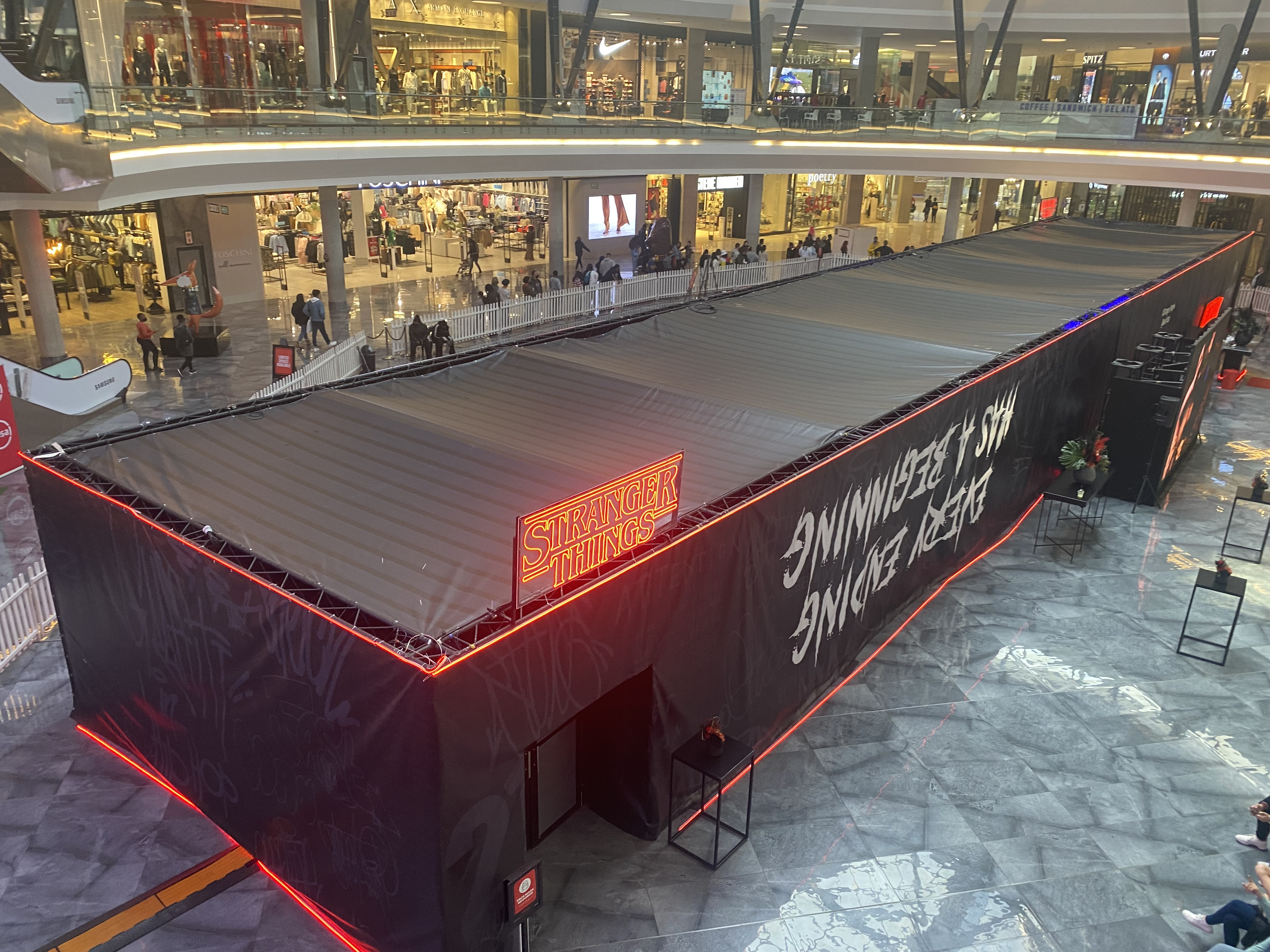
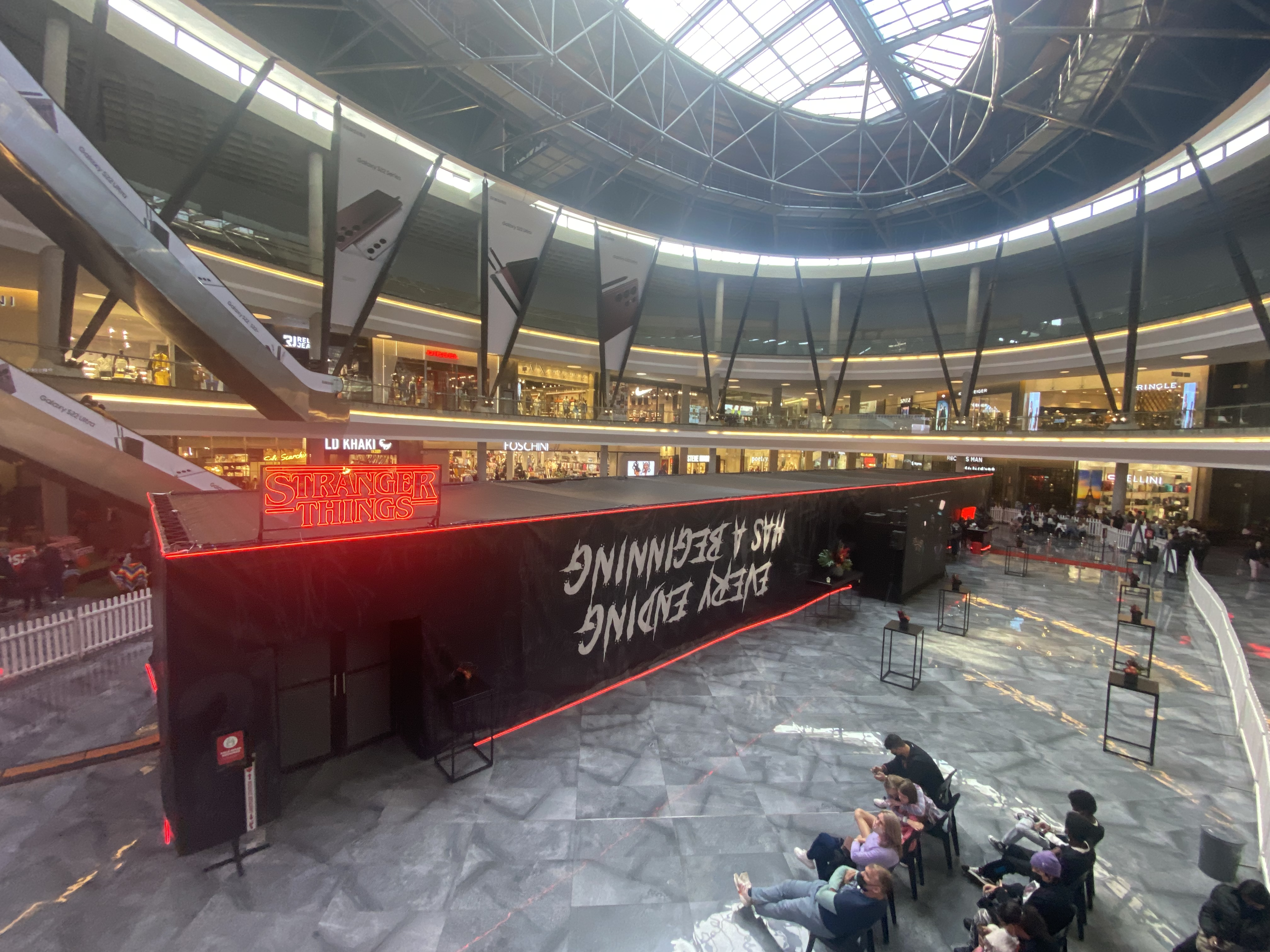
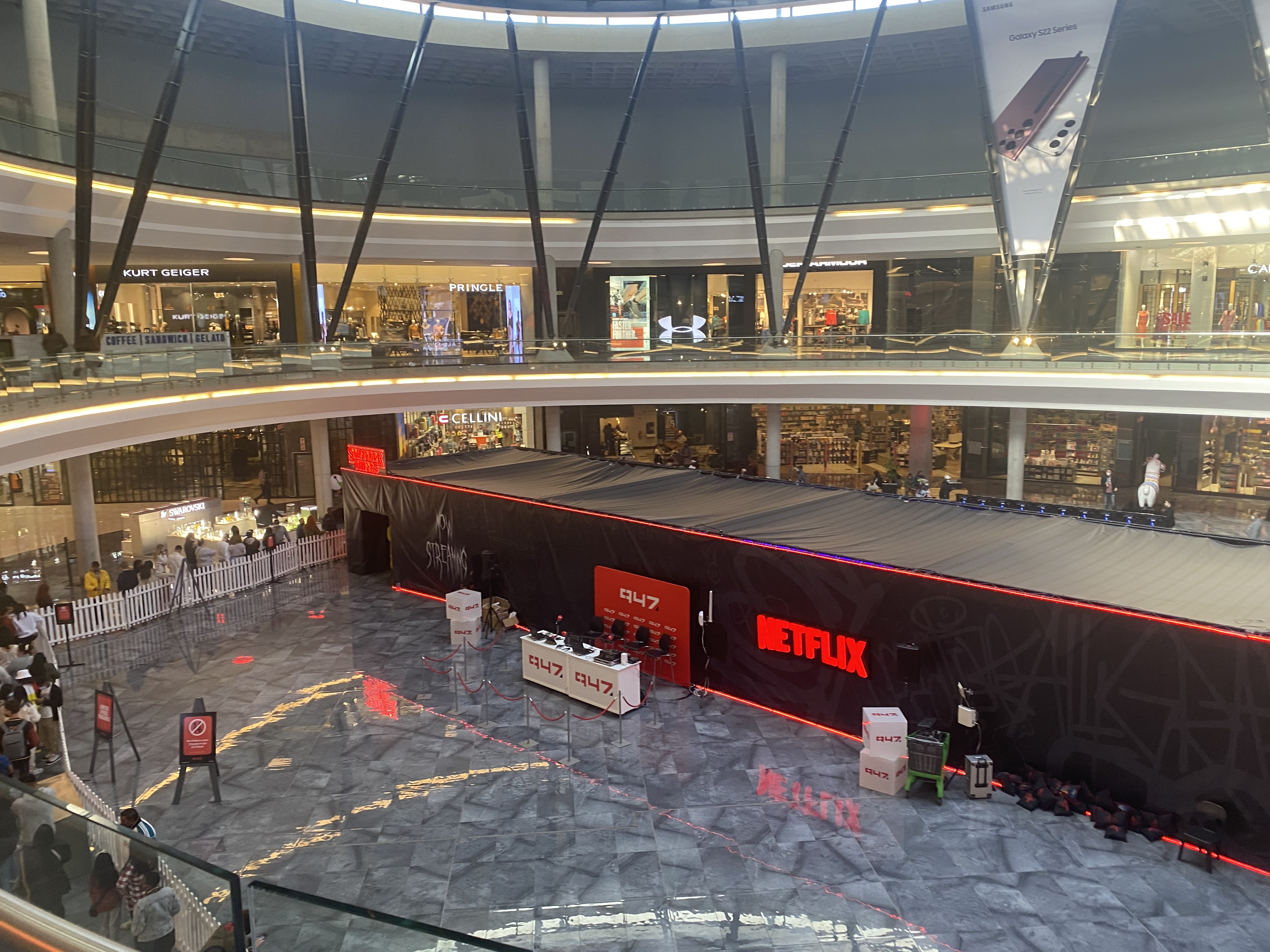

From June 16 to 19, 2022, Netflix South Africa partnered with Fourways Mall to operate the Stranger Things Experience. The Experience previously operated at the Canal Walk Mall in Cape Town.

Come to Fourways Mall and immerse yourself in this epic, mysterious & fantastic world! The terror and excitement of heroes Mike, Will, Dustin, Lucas and Eleven, as you make your way through the unbelievable, interactive moments, from the most-watched English series to hit screens in May!

— Fourways Mall & Netflix SA, June 2022

== In other media ==
Lego introduced a Stranger Things set called "The Upside Down", based on a version of the Byers' home and its replica in the Upside Down, in May 2019. In 2020, The Upside Down set was awarded "Toy of the Year" and also "Specialty Toy of the Year" by the Toy Association. Netflix partnered with Epic Games to include some elements of Stranger Things as cosmetics in Fortnite Battle Royale in the weeks preceding the show's third season launch. Stranger Things DLC for the VR game Face Your Fears was also released.

Within a September 17, 2019, update for the asymmetric multiplayer horror game Dead by Daylight, the Demogorgon was released as one of the killers, along with Nancy Wheeler and Steve Harrington as survivors. The chapter was later removed on November 17, 2021, before being returned to the game on November 6, 2023. A second collaboration with the game ran from January 27, 2026, which introduced Eleven, Dustin Henderson, Robin Buckley and Eddie Munson as Survivors, and Vecna as a Killer. Stranger Things-themed vehicles and cosmetics were added to Rocket League for its 2019 Halloween event. In the MOBA Smite, a number of Stranger Things-themed character skins were created and released as part of a crossover Battle Pass, such as Starcourt Eleven Scylla, Hopper Apollo, The Demogorgon Bakasura and The Mind Flayer Sylvanus.

As part of its release on Netflix on April 14, 2017, the cast of the rebooted version of Mystery Science Theater 3000 riffed on the first part of "Chapter 1" of Stranger Things. Google used augmented reality (AR) "stickers" of Stranger Things characters to introduce its ARCore technology announced alongside its Pixel 2 phone in October 2017. Sesame Street created a young audience-appropriate spoof of Stranger Things, called Sharing Things, released in November 2017; it featured Cookie Monster as the "Cookiegorgon", Grover as Lucas, Ernie as Dustin, and included several nods to the narrative of the second season.

The Simpsons episode "Treehouse of Horror XXX", which aired on October 20, 2019, included the segment Danger Things, a parody of Stranger Things. The classic 1980s bicycles used in the series have been produced in limited runs that sell out quickly. The mobile game The Seven Deadly Sins: Grand Cross had a Stranger Things crossover event and the story followed the characters being transported to the universe of the anime. The Stranger Things characters could be unlocked for a limited time. Stranger Things would also get a crossover with Transformers releasing a figure of Autobot Code Red.

On January 5, 2026, professional wrestling promotion WWE held a live television special on Netflix to mark the one-year anniversary of Raw on the platform. It served as a Stranger Things themed crossover episode.

On July 16, 2026, the webtoon series was announced and released by Webtoon company to read other webtoon by fans.
