= Stranger Things season 4 =

Season of television series

Stranger Things
- Season 4
- Promotional poster
- Showrunner: Matt Duffer Ross Duffer
- Starring: Winona Ryder; David Harbour; Millie Bobby Brown; Finn Wolfhard; Gaten Matarazzo; Caleb McLaughlin; Noah Schnapp; Sadie Sink; Natalia Dyer; Charlie Heaton; Joe Keery; Maya Hawke; Brett Gelman; Priah Ferguson; Matthew Modine; Paul Reiser
- No. of episodes: 9

Release
- Original network: Netflix
- Original release: May 27 – July 1, 2022

Season chronology
- ← Previous; Season 3 Next → Season 5

The fourth season of the American science fiction horror drama television series Stranger Things, marketed as Stranger Things 4, was released worldwide on the streaming service Netflix in two volumes. The first set of seven episodes was released on May 27, 2022, and the second set of two episodes was released on July 1. The season was produced by the show's creators, the Duffer Brothers, along with Shawn Levy, Dan Cohen, Iain Paterson, and Curtis Gwinn.

The principal cast for the season includes Winona Ryder, David Harbour, Millie Bobby Brown, Finn Wolfhard, Gaten Matarazzo, Caleb McLaughlin, Noah Schnapp, Sadie Sink, Natalia Dyer, Charlie Heaton, Joe Keery, Maya Hawke, Brett Gelman, Priah Ferguson, Matthew Modine, and Paul Reiser, while the recurring cast includes Jamie Campbell Bower, Cara Buono, Joseph Quinn, Eduardo Franco, Mason Dye, Sherman Augustus, Tom Wlaschiha, and Nikola Đuričko.

The season received critical acclaim for its production values, visual effects, acting, soundtrack, emotional weight, and the darker, more mature tone compared to the previous season, though some criticism was directed at the lengthier episode runtimes. The first volume of the season received 13 nominations for the 74th Primetime Emmy Awards, including Outstanding Drama Series, winning five, while the second volume received five nominations for the 75th Primetime Emmy Awards.

== Premise ==
Set in March 1986, eight months after the events of the third season, the fourth season follows three different plot lines.

The first plot line is set in Hawkins, Indiana, where a series of mysterious teenage murders begin haunting the town. Eddie Munson, leader of the Hellfire Club, Hawkins High School's Dungeons & Dragons group, becomes a prime suspect in the murders after senior cheerleading captain Chrissy Cunningham dies in his trailer. Dustin Henderson, Lucas and Erica Sinclair, Max Mayfield, Steve Harrington, Nancy Wheeler, and Robin Buckley begin investigating to clear Eddie's name, while other classmates, led by Jason Carver, hunt Eddie. The group discovers that the true perpetrator is a powerful being who resides in the Upside Down, whom they name "Vecna" after the eponymous Dungeons & Dragons character.

The second plot line involves Mike Wheeler visiting Eleven, Will Byers, and Jonathan Byers at their new home in Lenora Hills, California. Due to the events in Hawkins and the imminent danger to her friends, Eleven, after being arrested for assaulting her bully, goes with Dr. Sam Owens to a secret facility in the Nevada desert to regain her powers, an operation named the Nina Project, where she is reunited with Dr. Martin Brenner and forced to confront her past in Hawkins National Laboratory with the aid of an isolation tank. The U.S. Military, led by Lt. Colonel Jack Sullivan, believes Eleven to be behind the murders in Hawkins and hunts her. Mike, Will, Jonathan, and their new friend Argyle attempt to reach Eleven before she regains her powers.

The third plot line follows Joyce Byers and Murray Bauman as they venture to Russia upon learning that Jim Hopper may still be alive. Meanwhile, Hopper is held in a Soviet prison camp in Kamchatka, where he and the other inmates, including Dmitri Antonov, are forced to battle a Demogorgon that the Russians have captured.

== Cast and characters ==
=== Main ===
- Winona Ryder as Joyce Byers
- David Harbour as Jim Hopper
- Millie Bobby Brown as Eleven / Jane Hopper
  - Martie Blair as young Eleven
- Finn Wolfhard as Mike Wheeler
- Gaten Matarazzo as Dustin Henderson
- Caleb McLaughlin as Lucas Sinclair
- Noah Schnapp as Will Byers
- Sadie Sink as Max Mayfield
  - Belle Henry as young Max
- Natalia Dyer as Nancy Wheeler
- Charlie Heaton as Jonathan Byers
- Joe Keery as Steve Harrington
- Maya Hawke as Robin Buckley
- Brett Gelman as Murray Bauman
- Priah Ferguson as Erica Sinclair
- Matthew Modine as Martin Brenner
- Paul Reiser as Sam Owens

=== Also starring ===
- Jamie Campbell Bower as Henry Creel / One / Vecna
  - Raphael Luce as young Henry Creel
- Cara Buono as Karen Wheeler
- Eduardo Franco as Argyle
- Joseph Quinn as Eddie Munson

=== Recurring ===
- Joe Chrest as Ted Wheeler
- Tom Wlaschiha as Dmitri Antonov
- Mason Dye as Jason Carver
- Nikola Đuričko as Yuri Ismaylov
- Rob Morgan as Chief Powell
- John Reynolds as Officer Callahan
- Sherman Augustus as Lt. Colonel Jack Sullivan
- Myles Truitt as Patrick McKinney
- Gabriella Pizzolo as Suzie Bingham
- Tinsley and Anniston Price as Holly Wheeler
- Clayton Royal Johnson as Andy
- Tristan Spohn as Two
- Christian Ganiere as Ten
- Regina Ting Chen as Ms. Kelly
- Elodie Grace Orkin as Angela
- Logan Allen as Jake
- Alex Wagenman as Chad
- Gabriella Surodjawan as Stacy
- Hunter Romanillos as Chance
- Pasha D. Lychnikoff as Oleg
- Vaidotas Martinaitis as Warden Melnikov
- Nikolai Nikolaeff as Ivan
- Paris Benjamin as Agent Ellen Stinson
- Catherine Curtin as Claudia Henderson
- Karen Ceesay as Sue Sinclair
- Arnell Powell as Charles Sinclair
- Ira Amyx as Harmon
- Kendrick Cross as Wallace
- Hendrix Yancey as Thirteen

=== Guests ===
- Grace Van Dien as Chrissy Cunningham
- Amybeth McNulty as Vickie Dunne
- Logan Riley Bruner as Fred Benson
- Joel Stoffer as Wayne Munson
- Dacre Montgomery as Billy Hargrove
- Robert Englund as Victor Creel
  - Kevin L. Johnson as Young Victor Creel
- Tyner Rushing as Virginia Creel
- Livi Burch as Alice Creel
- Ed Amatrudo as Director Hatch
- Audrey Holcomb as Eden
- Trey Best as Jeff
- Gwydion Lashlee-Walton as Gareth
- Grant Goodman as Doug

== Episodes ==
No. overall	No. in season	Title	Directed by	Written by	Original release date
Volume 1
26	1	"Chapter One: The Hellfire Club"	The Duffer Brothers	The Duffer Brothers	May 27, 2022
In a flashback to 1979, Dr. Brenner is experimenting on children with supernatural abilities until a mysterious incident kills all the children except Eleven. In 1986, eight months after the events at Starcourt Mall, Joyce, Will, Jonathan, and Eleven have moved to California, where Eleven struggles with the loss of her powers and is routinely bullied by other students. Joyce receives a porcelain doll in the mail, seemingly from Russia, and finds a hidden note stating that Jim Hopper is alive. In Hawkins, Mike and Dustin have joined their high school's "Hellfire Club," a Dungeons & Dragons club run by the iconoclastic Eddie Munson. As a result, they miss seeing Lucas win the basketball team's championship. Max, who broke up with Lucas, struggles to grieve Billy's death. Chrissy Cunningham, a student on the cheerleading squad, is tormented by visions of her abusive mother and a ticking grandfather clock. While buying drugs from Eddie, Chrissy is possessed and killed by a sentient humanoid creature from her visions.
27	2	"Chapter Two: Vecna's Curse"	The Duffer Brothers	The Duffer Brothers	May 27, 2022
Hopper survived the explosion beneath the Starcourt Mall, but was captured by Soviet soldiers and sent to a prison camp in Kamchatka. Joyce and Murray call the phone number listed on the note they sent him and speak to Dmitri Antonov, a prison guard Hopper has bribed. Antonov asks them to deliver a $40,000 ransom to his contact in Alaska. Mike flies to California to visit Eleven, where he and Will witness her classmate Angela bullying her; Eleven eventually retaliates by hitting Angela in the face with a skate. Max tells Dustin that she saw Eddie fleeing the night Chrissy died. Along with Robin and Steve, they track down the traumatized Eddie and explain the Upside Down to him. Eddie and Dustin dub the entity that killed Chrissy "Vecna." Nancy and her fellow journalist Fred investigate Chrissy's death; Eddie's uncle Wayne tells Nancy he believes the killer is Victor Creel, a Hawkins resident who was institutionalized after allegedly murdering his family in the 1950s. Fred is lured to the woods by visions of a student he accidentally killed before Vecna murders him.
28	3	"Chapter Three: The Monster and the Superhero"	Shawn Levy	Caitlin Schneiderhan	May 27, 2022
Sam Owens is visited by U.S. Army Lieutenant Colonel Jack Sullivan, who believes Eleven is responsible for Chrissy's death. Eleven is arrested for assaulting Angela, but Owens takes her away, explaining that Hawkins is in grave danger and that he has been working on a program to help Eleven regain her powers. Eleven agrees to go with him. Joyce and Murray fly to Alaska to deliver Hopper's ransom. Hopper bribes a fellow inmate to break his shackles with a sledgehammer. Nancy and Robin go to the library to research Victor Creel and discover that Creel believes his family's murders were committed by a demon, which they believe to be Vecna. Chrissy's boyfriend Jason leads the basketball team to hunt for Eddie, whom he believes is Chrissy's murderer, but Lucas abandons them when Jason becomes violent. Max remembers that Chrissy had visited the school counselor before being killed by Vecna. She steals Chrissy and Fred's files from the counselor's office and discovers they suffered from post-traumatic stress disorder symptoms similar to her own. Max hears Vecna call her by name and hallucinates a grandfather clock.
29	4	"Chapter Four: Dear Billy"	Shawn Levy	Paul Dichter	May 27, 2022
Joyce and Murray deliver the ransom payment to Antonov's contact, Yuri, but he drugs them and plans to hand them (and Hopper and Antonov) over to the Russians for a larger profit. Hopper escapes from the prison camp but is soon recaptured. Jonathan, Mike, and Will prepare to escape from Wallace and Harmon, agents sent by Owens to watch them, but armed soldiers attack the house. They escape with the help of Jonathan's friend Argyle, bringing the wounded Harmon with them. Nancy and Robin interview the imprisoned Victor Creel, who recounts how his family was tormented and killed by supernatural forces while he was being arrested for their murders. Max, fearing that Vecna is about to kill her, writes letters to her friends and family and goes to the cemetery to read Billy's letter at his gravestone. She is soon possessed by Vecna and finds herself at an altar within her mind. Steve, Dustin, and Lucas learn from Nancy and Robin that playing music can break Vecna's spell, and they put Max's favorite song, "Running Up That Hill," on a cassette tape. This opens a portal through which Max narrowly escapes Vecna's control.
30	5	"Chapter Five: The Nina Project"	Nimród Antal	Kate Trefry	May 27, 2022
Owens takes Eleven to an abandoned ICBM silo in Nevada, where he and Dr. Brenner have developed a specialized isolation tank (called "NINA") that will allow Eleven to access memories of her time with other kids at Hawkins Lab. After her first time in the tank, Eleven tries to escape and briefly regains her powers in the process, convincing her to continue the experiment. In California, before dying, Agent Harmon gives the kids a pen containing a phone number for Project NINA that connects to a modem; Mike decides to enlist the help of Dustin's girlfriend, Suzie, in Salt Lake City. After Yuri's betrayal, Hopper is imprisoned along with Antonov. While flying to Russia, Joyce and Murray subdue Yuri and crash in the taiga. Max, Lucas, Steve, and Dustin reunite with Nancy and Robin and investigate the Creel house. Inside, they encounter flickering lights, which they attribute to Vecna's movements in the Upside Down. Jason and his teammates locate Eddie attempting to escape in a boat on Lover's Lake; Jason and Patrick swim after him. In the water, Vecna kills Patrick in front of Jason and Eddie.
31	6	"Chapter Six: The Dive"	Nimród Antal	Curtis Gwinn	May 27, 2022
Eleven relives memories of befriending a lab nurse, who warns her not to trust Brenner. She also recalls being threatened by other test subjects, leading her to believe she was responsible for the lab massacre. Suzie helps Mike's group locate the coordinates for Project NINA. Hopper and the other inmates are given a large feast, which Hopper attributes to the Russians preparing to feed them to the Demogorgon. He later manages to steal a lighter, remembering that the Demogorgon's weakness is fire. Joyce and Murray force Yuri to take them to a nearby town where he stores his belongings and decide that Murray will impersonate Yuri to infiltrate the prison. Jason galvanizes the residents of Hawkins at a town hall meeting against Eddie's alleged Satanic cult, the "Hellfire Club." The Hawkins group finds Eddie; Dustin notices his compass is malfunctioning and realizes there must be a new portal to the Upside Down nearby. They trace the portal to Lover's Lake, where Steve dives in to inspect it before being pulled into the Upside Down by a tendril and surrounded by bat-like creatures; Nancy, Robin, and Eddie jump in after him.
32	7	"Chapter Seven: The Massacre at Hawkins Lab"	The Duffer Brothers	The Duffer Brothers	May 27, 2022
Joyce, Murray, and Yuri enter Kamchatka and witness Hopper and his fellow inmates fighting the Demogorgon. Hopper stops the creature with a flaming spear while Murray and Joyce subdue the guards and open the prison gates, allowing Hopper and Antonov to escape. Joyce and Hopper are reunited. Dustin, Lucas, and Erica theorize that Vecna has created a portal at the site of each murder, which they communicate to the older teens in the Upside Down. Both groups meet inside Eddie's trailer at the gate where Chrissy died. Robin and Eddie emerge unharmed, but Vecna possesses Nancy. She discovers that he is Victor Creel's son, Henry, who killed his mother and sister with his psychokinetic powers before falling into a coma and being placed in Brenner's care. Henry became Subject 001 in Brenner's attempts to replicate his powers and later the orderly whom Eleven befriended. Eleven finally remembers that Henry committed the lab massacre and tried to kill her when she refused to help fulfill his murderous ambitions; Eleven overpowered Henry and sent him to the Upside Down where he eventually became Vecna.
Volume 2
33	8	"Chapter Eight: Papa"	The Duffer Brothers	The Duffer Brothers	July 1, 2022
Vecna shows Nancy, who is still possessed by him, a vision of the future in which Hawkins is torn apart by rifts before freeing her. The group determines that Vecna needs four portals to implement his plan; Max volunteers to lure Vecna into possessing her so the others can attack him while he's distracted. Eleven, using her powers, learns of this plan and gets Owens to arrange transit to Hawkins. However, Brenner betrays and secures Owens and traps Eleven, insisting she needs to complete her training. Eleven realizes that Brenner had been using her for years to try to retrieve Henry from the Upside Down. Sullivan and his forces arrive and kill all the staff; Brenner escapes with Eleven, but is shot himself. Sullivan's crew tries to kill Eleven from a helicopter, but she uses her powers to eliminate them just as the California group arrives. As Brenner bleeds out in her arms, he asks for her forgiveness; Eleven silently leaves him to die. In Russia, Hopper, Joyce, Murray, Yuri, and Antonov escape the base after discovering several more creatures from the Upside Down, as well as a shadowy fragment of the Mind Flayer, which is being studied at the prison.
34	9	"Chapter Nine: The Piggyback"	The Duffer Brothers	The Duffer Brothers	July 1, 2022
The Hawkins group puts their plan into action: Max, Lucas, and Erica go to the Creel House while Steve, Nancy, and Robin go to its Upside Down counterpart to attack Vecna, with the bats being lured by Dustin and Eddie. Eddie sacrifices himself in the process. Eleven's group creates an isolation tank so she can enter Max's mind and fight Vecna. However, Vecna overwhelms her and possesses Max, revealing to Eleven that he has controlled the Upside Down since she sent him there. Mike professes his love for Eleven, giving her the strength to break Vecna's control over Max, but after Jason interferes, Max dies from her injuries. Hopper, Joyce, and Murray re-enter the prison and kill the remaining Demogorgons, weakening Vecna. Steve, Robin, and Nancy set fire to Vecna's physical form and shoot him, seemingly killing him. Eleven uses her powers to revive Max, but Max's brief death allows Vecna's portals to open and pass through Hawkins, killing Jason. Two days later, the town recovers from an "earthquake." Everyone reunites, while Max remains comatose. Will senses that Vecna is still alive, and the Upside Down begins to invade Hawkins.

== Production ==
=== Development ===
As with seasons past, planning for the fourth season of Stranger Things began before the preceding season's release. In an interview with Entertainment Weekly that ran shortly after the third season's release, series creators Matt and Ross Duffer revealed the series' creative team had already met on several occasions to discuss the show's future. On September 30, 2019, Netflix announced it had signed the Duffer Brothers for a new multi-year television and film deal that was reportedly worth nine figures. To coincide with the production deal announcement, Netflix also announced the renewal of Stranger Things for a fourth season by releasing a brief, minute-long teaser on YouTube.

=== Writing ===
Commenting on the previous season's ending, Ross Duffer divulged the process of connecting story arcs between seasons:

We don't want to write ourselves in a corner so we try to have these early discussions with the writers just to make sure that we're setting ourselves up to go in the right direction. We don't know a lot, but we do know a lot of the big broad strokes. At the end of season two, we knew about Billy. We knew that the Russians were going to come in. We didn't know the mall and stuff, but again, we know these big broad strokes. That's sort of where we are in season four. We have the big broad strokes. It's just now about filling in those lines in the details. We're pretty excited about where it's potentially going to go. Again, like we said, it's going to feel very different than this season. But I think that's the right thing to do and I think it'll be exciting.

Matt Duffer indicated one of the plot's "broad strokes" is the main center of action being moved out of Hawkins, Indiana, for the majority of the season, a series first. He also indicated the several loose ends left by the ending of season three, such as Hopper's perceived death and Eleven being adopted by Joyce Byers and relocating with her new family out of state, will all be explored sometime during the fourth season. The Duffers later expanded on their previous comments, saying that "epic" triptych structure of the fourth season was one of the main contributing factors to its exaggerated length. They likened it to the HBO series Game of Thrones in terms of its sheer scale, runtime, and newer, more mature tonal shift, as well as having split their characters across multiple distant locations.

Another contributing factor to the show's newly extended length was the expressed goal of the Duffers to finally provide answers to uncertainties regarding the series' long-simmering mythology, which they have been slowly revealing like "layers of [an] onion" over the past three seasons. Halfway through writing the fourth season, Matthew and Ross realized they were going to need a ninth episode to include all of their desired plot points, which Netflix "quickly approved". During production on the first season, the duo prepared a twenty-page document for Netflix that explained the show's universe, including what the Upside Down is, in clear detail. In turn, material from the document dictated certain plots while writing the season. The Duffers wanted to spend more time within the Upside Down in this season, as the narrative of the third season gave them little opportunity to explore it further.

Since the fourth season was the longest-running season produced to date, the Duffers and Netflix opted for a two-part release plan. In a letter from the Duffer Brothers posted by Netflix, the duo revealed they wrote nine scripts spanning over 800 pages, and that the fourth season is nearly double the length of any of the previously released seasons.

In an interview on the Netflix podcast Present Company with Krista Smith, Ross Duffer discussed season four's more mature tone, which he indicated would be at least partially achieved by "[leaning] into" the horror genre:

When we pitched it to Netflix all those years ago, we pitched it as the kids are... The Goonies in E.T. That's their storyline. And the adults are in Jaws and Close Encounters [sic] and then the teens are in Nightmare on Elm Street or Halloween. But, this year, we don't have the kids. We can't do The Goonies anymore. And so, suddenly, we're leaning much harder into that horror movie territory that we love. It was fun to make that change.

In a May 2022 interview with Entertainment Weekly on their Around the Table series, Finn Wolfhard stated that this season feels like "five movies into one", comparing it to "Scooby-Doo-meets-Zodiac-killer" while also being a "stoner action-comedy" and a "Russian prison movie".

The character of Eddie Munson is based on Damien Echols, one of the West Memphis Three who was wrongly convicted in 1994 of the deaths of three boys due to his appearance, which residents tied to being part of a satanic cult. The writers drew from Paradise Lost, a documentary covering Echols, for Eddie's story.

As they had done with the Demogorgon from the first season, the Duffers opted to use the Dungeons & Dragons character of Vecna as the basis of this season's antagonist, something that the child characters would recognize and understand the dangers due to their familiarity through the role-playing game. While Vecna was not fully introduced in Dungeons & Dragons materials until 1990 through the module Vecna Lives! and only had been alluded to in the lore prior to that, the Duffers believed that Eddie was an advanced gamemaster that was able to extrapolate how Vecna would behave for purposes of the show. As they worked on the season and the Stranger Things: The First Shadow (2023) play, the Duffers came about with the idea that Martin Brenner had used Henry Creel's blood to create more psychic children, with Eleven being his most successful manifestation of that, to serve as living weapons for the Cold War era. Tying the idea into the show's main antagonist, the Duffers started to really explore the concept because of finding interesting the possibility to use it to delve and explain where Eleven's powers actually originated from. Brenner had originally been planned to be confirmed alive and return as early as the second season, but the Duffers realized as they developed that season that there wasn't a place for Brenner to come back then; he instead appeared as illusions projected towards Eleven.

The Duffers originally talked out about having Will Byers come out as gay in the season, which they had been discussing and wanting to do for a very long time, but they realized that they lacked the space to do it properly. In retrospective, they were glad they didn't because it gave them the time to arc the entire season towards Will's eventual coming out in the following fifth and final season, where he starts to embrace himself.

=== Casting ===
By November 1, 2019, casting had begun to add four new male characters to the fourth season's lineup, with three of the roles being teenagers and one of them being an adult. The teenaged roles were characterized as ranging "from a metalhead to an entitled jock to a character that sounds an awful lot like the twin of Fast Times at Ridgemont High stoner Jeff Spicoli", while the adult character was tied to the Russian storyline introduced during the third season.

On December 3, 2019, it was confirmed by the show's writers' room that Maya Hawke's character Robin would be returning for the fourth season. On February 14, 2020, Netflix confirmed David Harbour would return as Jim Hopper and that Tom Wlaschiha had been cast as a Russian malefactor. Priah Ferguson's return to the series was confirmed in February 2020. That March, Brett Gelman's promotion to series regular was also confirmed. On October 27, 2020, it was reported that Maya Hawke's brother, Levon Thurman-Hawke, was cast in an undisclosed role.

On November 20, 2020, Jamie Campbell Bower, Eduardo Franco, and Joseph Quinn were cast in main roles, while Sherman Augustus, Mason Dye, Nikola Đuričko, and Robert Englund joined the cast in recurring roles for the fourth season; Englund, best known for portraying Freddy Krueger in the Nightmare on Elm Street films, had approached the Duffers for a role in Stranger Things, which fit well with the direction they wanted to take this season. On June 9, 2021, Amybeth McNulty, Myles Truitt, Regina Ting Chen, and Grace Van Dien joined the cast in recurring roles for the fourth season.

Bower was initially announced to be cast as "Peter Ballard", and credits for his role in the first six episodes were listed as "Friendly Orderly". This was to hide the reveal that his character was the grown-up Henry Creel, who was the first test subject for Dr. Brenner and thus named "One", and that he would become Vecna following his battle with Eleven.

=== Filming ===
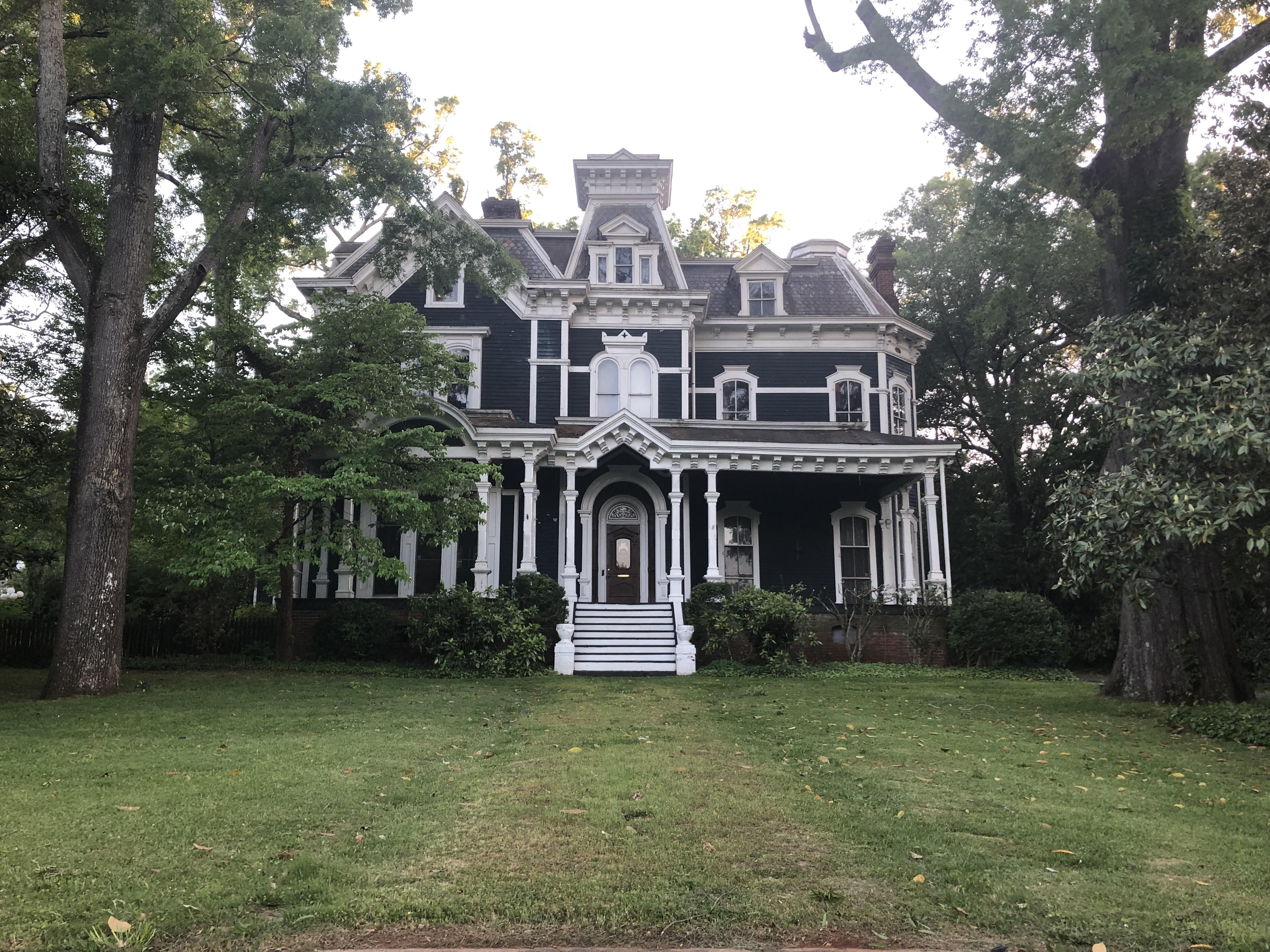
The Claremont House in Rome, Georgia was used for exterior shots of the Creel House.

In February 2020, it was announced in a joint statement from the Duffer Brothers and Netflix that production had officially begun on the fourth season in Vilnius, Lithuania, at the recently decommissioned Lukiškės Prison as well as Kyviskes airfield. After production wrapped in Lithuania, filming resumed in the United States in and around the Atlanta metro area, the primary production location of previous seasons. However, after two weeks of filming, all Netflix productions, including Stranger Things, were halted on March 16, 2020, due to the onset of the COVID-19 pandemic. A significant portion of filming occurred at Albuquerque Studios in New Mexico, which Netflix acquired in 2018.

After several delays, filming resumed on September 28, 2020, in Georgia. On October 1, 2020, Natalia Dyer, Sadie Sink, and Gaten Matarazzo were all spotted filming scenes at the Hawkins Middle School and Hawkins High School sets. The three were also spotted filming scenes at the set for Dustin's house the following day. Filming took place in late 2020 around Rome, Georgia, including exterior shots of the Claremont House, which was used as the Creel House in the show. The "Pennhurst Mental Hospital" scenes were shot in Berry College, in Mount Berry, near Rome.

On January 27, 2021, Matthew Modine was spotted filming scenes in Atlanta. The Duffers had originally intended to hide Modine's involvement in the season so Dr. Martin Brenner's return to the show would be a surprise, but his presence in the season leaked on his first day of filming when paparazzi snapped a photo of Modine in a convertible. On March 15, 2021, set photos were leaked of a trailer park in Griffin, Georgia that was dressed with tendrils from the Upside Down. In June 2021, David Harbour said filming was set to wrap in August. The same month, Joe Keery, Sadie Sink, Natalia Dyer, Maya Hawke, Priah Ferguson, and Caleb McLaughlin were spotted filming a scene that involved buying weapons from a store. In August 2021, a fire with no injuries near one of the filming sets was reported. In September 2021, Noah Schnapp stated that filming had wrapped.

To visually distinguish between the season's three storylines, costume designer Amy Parris revealed that each of the plot's locations will have their own distinct color palette: "It's so fun because [the production team gets] to kind of capture California versus Hawkins through color. So, Hawkins still looks very saturated. We don't have as much as the dusty, rusty brown of Seasons 1 or 2 ... And in California, we get to incorporate baby pinks, and fun teals and purples. It's way more sun-soaked and saturated as opposed to the richer colors of Hawkins." American shoe company Converse designed three different styles of shoes using the Hawkins High School colors to be worn onscreen during a scene depicting a pep rally.

According to Bower, for the key scenes of the massacre at the Hawkins lab, Brown herself helped to direct Martie Blair, who played the younger version of Eleven, so that the multiple filmings of Eleven's interactions with Henry in the lab, some with Brown and some with Blair, were consistent in Eleven's mannerisms.

Dacre Montgomery could not leave Australia to film for the fourth episode due to continued COVID-19 lockdowns, so his scenes was filmed by a local crew whilst Sink acted against a stand-in months prior. Levy directed Montgomery via Zoom and the performances were edited together in post-production.

=== Post-production ===
In April 2022, The Wall Street Journal reported in an article scrutinizing Netflix's recent production expenditures that the total cost to produce the season was around $270 million, which amounts to roughly $30 million per episode, making it up to that point the most expensive Netflix production and the third most in all of television—behind The Lord of the Rings: The Rings of Power ($58 million) and Citadel ($50 million).

=== Visual effects ===
Due to the season's considerable length, thousands of visual effect shots were commissioned and rendered during the two-year production and post-production processes. However, the Duffers wanted to rely more on practical effects than computer-generated ones, similar to how the first season was produced. For example, the season's major threat from the Upside Down, a humanoid creature called Vecna, was "90% practical", which the Duffers found created a better presence on the set for the actors to respond to rather than a prop for later computer-generated effects.

Barrie Gower, a make-up artist that had worked previously on Game of Thrones and Chernobyl, provided the look for Vecna and other creatures. Vecna was loosely based on the Dungeons & Dragons villain of the same name, though the character in the universe of the show is a human "who mutated into a monster from overexposure to the Upside Down ... he's been subjected to all the environments and all the surroundings of the Upside Down basically for 20 odd years." Jamie Campbell Bower, who plays the human character that is turned into Vecna, also played the role of Vecna with the use of planned prosthetics. Once the outfit was prepared, it took about seven hours of work to fit Bower into it.

Gower designed Bower's Vecna costume with "anemic" skin whose integration with the toxic environment of the Upside Down was apparent through the inclusion of "lot of roots and vines and very organic shapes and fibrous muscle tissue." To achieve this look using mostly practical effects, Gower disclosed that he and his team took a full body cast of Bower, to later sculpt to meet their design needs:

We started off with his life cast, and to make sure everything was going to be super skin-tight, we reduced the life cast by a certain percentage all over, so once we had a plaster form of his entire body, our guys here started modeling the body in all shapes and forms in the Plasticine, which took several weeks to do that. From that, we split the body up into various sections... I think it was about 18 pieces in total, and they all went on to their own respective formers made out of either fiberglass or epoxy resin. And then we made molds of all the separate Plasticine pieces and then once we had these molds, we were able to create prosthetic appliances, and we've done them in a mixture of materials.

Before and after comparison of visual effects work done by Rodeo FX.

As with season three, Montreal-based Rodeo FX was contracted to provide a number of visual effects for the fourth season. One of the most complicated shots they worked on tracked a demobat as it glided through the air towards the Creel house in the Upside Down. Due to its various complexities, the company reports the shot took two years to animate to completion. To animate the death scenes of Vecna's cursed victims, personnel at Rodeo FX conducted "extensive research on broken bones and accidents" so they could properly manipulate the actor's CGI doubles to make their death look convincingly gruesome. The company also animated the demogorgon and demodogs seen in the Kamchatka prison, and updated their designs to better compliment the brighter lighting of the setting that was not present in seasons one and two.

The season was released while the visual effects team were still perfecting the special effects, due to challenges encountered during the COVID-19 pandemic. Production went eight weeks over schedule for the season, without a change to the release date. The amount of visual effects work required for the season during a limited time period led Netflix to bring over some visual effects editors working on other shows they produced to devote more resources to this season. The Duffer brothers said that they updated certain visual effects shots in the season's first volume during its initial release weekend, a practice Netflix has not allowed for any of its past releases. Similarly with volume two, a number of visual effects shots had finished rendering the morning of June 30, a day before the release. The season finale was originally uploaded with an estimated 20 unfinished visual effects shots to meet the release deadline. In all, season four's two-and-a-half hour finale had more visual effects shots than the entirety of season three. Three weeks after the season's release, the visual effects team was still updating visual effects shots at the request of the Duffers.

=== Music ===
Both volumes of the original soundtrack album for the fourth season, titled Stranger Things 4, were released digitally on July 1, 2022, via Lakeshore and Invada Records. Like the previous three seasons, the soundtrack was composed by Kyle Dixon and Michael Stein of the electronic band Survive. Both volumes were also released on physical formats such as CD and vinyl.

The non-original soundtrack companion album for the season, titled Stranger Things: Music from the Netflix Original Series, Season 4, was released digitally in two volumes by Legacy Recordings on May 27 and July 1, respectively.

Kate Bush's "Running Up That Hill" is featured multiple times during the season, including as part of the key scene in episode 4 with Max escaping from Vecna. The Duffers had envisioned a powerful emotional song for Max and had tasked music supervisor Nora Felder to determine which song would be used. Felder came upon "Running Up That Hill", which the Duffers agreed was a great fit for both the music itself and the theme of dealing with God. Winona Ryder also mentioned in an interview that she had been dropping hints to include the singer since the first season, arriving on sets in her Kate Bush T-shirts. Felder knew that Bush had been cautious on music licensing before, but after contacting her, Felder learned Bush was a fan of the show, and after reviewing the script pages where the song would be used, Bush agreed to clear licensing rights to the song for the show. The song saw a resurgence of popularity with an increase of over 8,700% on streaming charts, reaching the second-most heard song on Spotify playlists in the United States and the fourth-most song for worldwide charts. Metallica's "Master of Puppets" was prominently featured in the season finale when Eddie played its guitar riffs and solo as music to lure and distract demobats in the Upside Down. The song also got a significant boost peaking at number one on streaming platforms, and made listings on music charts in both the U.S. and UK for the first time since the song's original release in 1986.

Other songs featured in the season, such as Dead or Alive's "You Spin Me Round (Like a Record)", Musical Youth's "Pass the Dutchie", and Falco's "Rock Me Amadeus", also saw increased streaming playbacks of around 1,784 percent. The final two episodes of the season featured period music and classic rock songs such as Siouxsie and the Banshees' "Spellbound", James Taylor's "Fire and Rain", Rick Derringer's "Rock and Roll, Hoochie Koo" and Journey's "Separate Ways (Worlds Apart)". The compositions "Window of Appearances" and "Akhenaten and Nefertiti" from Philip Glass's opera Akhnaten feature in the seventh episode.

=== Marketing ===
The season's official announcement showed a ticking grandfather clock in the Upside Down and ended with the tagline "We're not in Hawkins anymore," which led many news outlets to speculate the show's setting would be relocated to Russia. A teaser was released on February 14, 2020, showing that Hopper was still alive. On October 2, 2020, the show's various social media accounts posted two photographs from different sets: A poster for a pep rally hanging in a hallway at Hawkins High, and a clapperboard in front of a grandfather clock in the Upside Down, a scene that was first depicted in the season's initial teaser trailer. A second teaser was released on May 6, 2021.

On August 6, 2021, a sneak peek was released featuring most of the core cast and announcing that the show would return in 2022. On September 25, 2021, a third teaser was released, showcasing the house that was previously owned by the Creel family. The final teaser was released on November 6, 2021, and showed inside Will's and Eleven's lives in California, with the episode titles for the season being revealed on that same day.

On February 17, 2022, the social media accounts associated with Stranger Things released four teaser posters, one to coincide with the four teasers that were previously released, and a fifth poster, announcing the release date of both volumes. On March 23, 2022, Netflix released various stills from the upcoming fourth season. On April 12, 2022, the first official trailer was released online. On May 20, 2022, the first eight minutes of the season's first episode were released online.

== Release ==
The fourth season was released on the streaming platform Netflix in two volumes, the first volume with seven episodes was released on May 27, 2022, while the second volume with two episodes was released five weeks later on July 1, 2022.

The season's release occurred three days after a mass school shooting in Uvalde, Texas, where a gunman fatally shot 21 people. In the aftermath of the tragedy, and considering that the first episode's cold open — a scene that had been released as an online tease one week before the premiere — features graphic images of dead bodies including those of children's, Netflix added a warning card before the prior season recap that automatically plays before the episode. The card, which is shown only to viewers in the United States, reads as follows:

"We filmed this season of Stranger Things a year ago. But given the recent tragic shooting at a school in Texas, viewers may find the opening scene of episode 1 distressing. We are deeply saddened by this unspeakable violence, and our hearts go out to every family mourning a loved one."

Shortly after the season's release, viewers reported that Will's friends did not acknowledge his birthday in an episode of the season that took place on that day. The Duffers said in an interview that they could rectify the matter by changing its month, which they called "George Lucas-ing the situation", in reference to the canon changes that George Lucas had made to the original Star Wars trilogy to match what the prequel trilogy had added. Some viewers took this to imply that scenes from earlier seasons were also being edited, including one scene where Jonathan takes discreet pictures of a pool party that Steve, Nancy, and Barbara are holding. The writers stated that "no scenes from previous seasons have ever been cut or re-edited", including this scene.

On July 1, 2022, after the second volume was released, Netflix reportedly crashed due to server overload as vast numbers of users logged on to stream the new episodes, overwhelming the service.

== Reception ==
=== Viewership ===
Netflix reported that by May 30, 2022, Stranger Things 4 had been viewed more than 287 million hours, surpassing the previous first-week viewership record from the second season of Bridgerton, which had 193 million hours in its first week. Earlier seasons of Stranger Things also broke into the top 10 viewed programs in the same week as Stranger Things 4's release. With its fourth season, Stranger Things became the second Netflix title to reach more than one billion hours viewed within its first 28 days of release, following the first season of Squid Game. It reached 1.352 billion hours of viewership in the first 28 days, making it the second-most viewed program after Squid Game, and the most viewed English-language series ever.

=== Critical reception ===
Stranger Things season 4: Critical reception by episode
Season 4 (2022): Percentage of positive critics' reviews tracked by the website Rotten Tomatoes

The season received acclaim from critics, who praised the performances, visuals, action sequences, realistic themes, soundtrack, emotional weight, and the darker tone, though some criticized it for being overstuffed due to the lengthier episode runtimes. The review aggregator Rotten Tomatoes calculated 88% of 193 critic reviews as positive, with an average rating of 7.9/10. The website's consensus reads: "Darker and denser than its predecessors, Stranger Things' fourth chapter sets the stage for the show's final season in typically binge-worthy fashion.” Metacritic, which uses a weighted average, assigned the season's first volume a score of 69 out of 100, based on 29 reviews, indicating "generally favorable" reviews; the second volume has a score of 74 out of 100, based on 18 reviews, also indicating "generally favorable" reviews.

Reviewing for The A.V. Club, Saloni Gajjar gave the season a "B+" and said, "Stranger Things still injects an enthralling backstory into its well-established universe. It's an indication that the final two episodes of Volume 2, despite its movie length, will only elevate season four." The Guardian's Jack Seale considered its fourth season to be "bigger, older, somewhat sadder – and as lovable as ever." Tilly Pearce of Digital Spy said that the series "continues to be the beautifully addictive nostalgic thrill ride we know and love. Season four is without a doubt the strongest offering to date and by far the most ambitious." Caroline Framke of Variety found that the season "mostly manages to keep everything moving at a steady enough clip once it establishes the four or so subplots that end up defining [it]." Writing for IGN, Alex Stedman praised the performances and called the season the series' "most ambitious" yet.

Tara Bennett from Paste gave it a score of 8.1 out of 10 and wrote, "There's a lot to love about Stranger Things Season 4, especially when it comes to some of the character progression and the change in vibe which fully embraces the tropes of the best of '80s horror." In a mixed review, Mae Trumata of The Upcoming gave it a 3/5 stars and said, "Overall, this is a fun continuation to Stranger Things. For anyone who's well acquainted and attached to the series and the characters, this is an addition that will either be appreciated or tired of, as it offers nothing significantly new." Author Stephen King reviewed the season as "as good or better than the previous three", pointing out a "Carrie riff". However, King opined that the decision to split the season into two parts is "kind of lame". Sophie Gilbert of The Atlantic was more critical, calling the season "a 13-hour-plus behemoth that added Wes Craven to its mood board but otherwise ended with undeveloped characters and obvious but superficial allusions to contemporary crises".

Patrick Caoile of Collider praised the season's villain and Jamie Campbell Bower's performance, writing, "For the first time, Stranger Things gives us a villain with layers. Through Vecna, Bower explores a compelling, more complicated villain than the monsters that came before. Vulture's Devon Ivie said, "[Bower] has the distinction of embodying three characters, each more unsettling than the last, as the episodes unfurl". TVLine named Joseph Quinn the "Performer of the Week" on May 28, 2022, for his performance in the episode "Chapter One: The Hellfire Club"; gave Sadie Sink an honorable mention on June 4, 2022, for her performance in the episode "Chapter Four: Dear Billy"; Millie Bobby Brown an honorable mention on July 2, 2022, for her performance in the penultimate episode "Chapter Eight: Papa"; and Caleb McLaughlin "Performer of the Week" on July 9, 2022 for his performance in the season's final episode "Chapter Nine: The Piggyback";

The season was listed as one of the best TV shows of 2022, with BuddyTV and PopBuzz placing it at number one. Entertainment.ie ranked it at number five, NME at number eight, ScreenCrush at number 10, and Empire at number 11. In addition, Nerdist included it in its unranked list.

=== Accolades ===
Year	Award	Category	Nominee(s)	Result	Ref.
2022	Bram Stoker Award	Superior Achievement in a Screenplay	The Duffer Brothers (for "Chapter One: The Hellfire Club")	Won	
2022	Hollywood Critics Association TV Awards	Best Streaming Series, Drama	Stranger Things	Nominated	
2022	Hollywood Critics Association TV Awards	Best Actress in a Streaming Series, Drama	Winona Ryder	Nominated	
2022	Hollywood Critics Association TV Awards	Best Supporting Actor in a Streaming Series, Drama	Joe Keery	Nominated	
2022	Hollywood Critics Association TV Awards	Best Supporting Actress in a Streaming Series, Drama	Millie Bobby Brown	Nominated	
2022	Hollywood Critics Association TV Awards	Best Supporting Actress in a Streaming Series, Drama	Maya Hawke	Nominated	
2022	Hollywood Critics Association TV Awards	Best Supporting Actress in a Streaming Series, Drama	Sadie Sink	Won	
2022	Hollywood Critics Association TV Awards	Best Directing in a Streaming Series, Drama	The Duffer Brothers (for "Chapter Seven: The Massacre At Hawkins Lab")	Nominated	
2022	Hollywood Critics Association TV Awards	Best Directing in a Streaming Series, Drama	Shawn Levy (for "Chapter Four: Dear Billy")	Nominated	
2022	Hollywood Critics Association TV Awards	Best Writing in a Streaming Series, Drama	The Duffer Brothers (for "Chapter Seven: The Massacre At Hawkins Lab")	Nominated	
2022	Location Managers Guild Awards	Outstanding Locations in Period Television	Tony Holley, Kyle A. Carey, John Lucas, Jonas Spokas, Vytautas Riabovas	Won	
2022	Primetime Emmy Awards	Outstanding Drama Series	The Duffer Brothers, Dan Cohen, Shawn Levy, Iain Paterson, Rand Geiger, and Justin Doble	Nominated	
2022	Primetime Creative Arts Emmy Awards	Outstanding Casting for a Drama Series	Carmen Cuba, Tara Feldstein, and Chase Paris	Nominated	
2022	Primetime Creative Arts Emmy Awards	Outstanding Music Supervision	Nora Felder (for "Chapter Four: Dear Billy")	Won	
2022	Primetime Creative Arts Emmy Awards	Outstanding Period and/or Character Hairstyling	Sarah Hindsgaul, Katrina Suhre, Brynn Berg, Dena Gibson, Jamie Freeman, Tariq Furgerson, Chase Heard and Charles Grico (for "Chapter Seven: The Massacre At Hawkins Lab")	Nominated	
2022	Primetime Creative Arts Emmy Awards	Outstanding Period and/or Character Makeup (Non-Prosthetic)	Amy L. Forsythe, Devin Morales, Leo Satkovitch, Nataleigh Verrengia, Rocco Gaglioti, Lisa Poe, Benji Dove and Jan Rooney (for "Chapter Two: Vecna's Curse")	Nominated	
2022	Primetime Creative Arts Emmy Awards	Outstanding Production Design for a Narrative Period Program (One Hour or More)	Chris Trujillo, Sean Brennan and Jess Royal (for "Chapter Seven: The Massacre At Hawkins Lab")	Nominated	
2022	Primetime Creative Arts Emmy Awards	Outstanding Prosthetic Makeup	Barrie Gower, Duncan Jarman, Mike Mekash, Eric Garcia and Nix Herrera (for "Chapter Four: Dear Billy")	Won	
2022	Primetime Creative Arts Emmy Awards	Outstanding Single-Camera Picture Editing for a Drama Series	Dean Zimmerman and Casey Cichocki (for "Chapter Four: Dear Billy")	Nominated	
2022	Primetime Creative Arts Emmy Awards	Outstanding Sound Mixing for a Comedy or Drama Series (One Hour)	William Files, Mark Paterson, Craig Henighan and Michael P. Clark for ("Chapter Seven: The Massacre At Hawkins Lab")	Won	
2022	Primetime Creative Arts Emmy Awards	Outstanding Sound Editing for a Comedy or Drama Series (One Hour)	Craig Henighan, William Files, Ryan Cole, Korey Pereira, Angelo Palazzo, Katie Halliday, Ken McGill, Steven Baine, David Klotz and Lena Glikson-Nezhelskaya (for "Chapter Seven: The Massacre At Hawkins Lab")	Won	
2022	Primetime Creative Arts Emmy Awards	Outstanding Special Visual Effects in a Season or a Movie	Michael Maher Jr., Marion Spates, Jabbar Raisani, Terron Pratt, Ashley J. Ward, Julien Hery, Niklas Jacobson, Manolo Mantero and Neil Eskuri	Nominated	
2022	Primetime Creative Arts Emmy Awards	Outstanding Stunt Coordination for a Drama Series, Limited Series or Movie	Hiro Koda	Won	
2022	Primetime Creative Arts Emmy Awards	Outstanding Stunt Performance	Matthew Scheib and Jura Yury Kruze (for "Chapter Four: Dear Billy")	Nominated	
2022	Set Decorators Society of America Awards	Best Achievement in Décor/Design of a One Hour Fantasy or Science Fiction Series	Jess Royal and Chris Trujillo	Won	
2022	Saturn Awards	Best Streaming Horror/Thriller Series	Stranger Things	Won	
2022	Saturn Awards	Best Actress in a Streaming Series	Millie Bobby Brown	Nominated	
2022	Saturn Awards	Supporting Actor in a Streaming Series	Joseph Quinn	Nominated	
2022	Saturn Awards	Performance by a Younger Actor (Streaming)	Gaten Matarazzo	Nominated	
2022	Saturn Awards	Performance by a Younger Actor (Streaming)	Sadie Sink	Nominated	
2022	Saturn Awards	Guest Performance in a Streaming Series	Robert Englund	Nominated	
2023	Art Directors Guild Awards	Excellence in Production Design for a One-Hour Fantasy Single-Camera Series	Chris Trujillo (for "Chapter Seven: The Massacre at Hawkins Lab")	Nominated	
2023	Critics' Choice Super Awards	Best Science Fiction/Fantasy Series	Stranger Things	Won (Note: Tied with Andor.)	
2023	Critics' Choice Super Awards	Best Villain in a Series	Jamie Campbell Bower	Nominated	
2023	Golden Reel Awards	Outstanding Achievement in Sound Editing – Broadcast Long Form Dialogue and ADR	William Files, Craig Henighan, Ryan Cole, Korey Pereira, Jill Purdy, David Butler, Polly McKinnon, Rob Chen (for "Chapter Seven: The Massacre at Hawkins Lab")	Nominated	
2023	Golden Reel Awards	Outstanding Achievement in Sound Editing – Broadcast Long Form Effects and Foley	William Files, Craig Henighan, Angelo Palazzo, Ken McGill, Katie Halliday, Lee Gilmore, David Grimaldi, Chris Bonis, Steve Baine (for "Chapter Seven: The Massacre at Hawkins Lab")	Won	
2023	Golden Reel Awards	Outstanding Achievement in Music Editing – Broadcast Long Form	Lena Glikson, David Klotz (for "Chapter Nine: The Piggyback")	Won	
2023	Make-Up Artists and Hair Stylists Guild Awards	Best Period and/or Character Make-Up	Amy L. Forsythe, Devin Morales, Lisa Poe, Nataleigh Verrengia	Nominated	
2023	Make-Up Artists and Hair Stylists Guild Awards	Best Special Make-Up Effects	Barrie Gower, Duncan Jarman, Patt Foad, Paula Eden	Nominated	
2023	MTV Movie & TV Awards	Best Show	Stranger Things	Nominated	
2023	MTV Movie & TV Awards	Best Performance in a Show	Sadie Sink	Nominated	
2023	MTV Movie & TV Awards	Best Villain	Jamie Campbell Bower	Nominated	
2023	MTV Movie & TV Awards	Best Fight	Jamie Campbell Bower (Vecna) vs. Millie Bobby Brown (Eleven)	Nominated	
2023	MTV Movie & TV Awards	Best Breakthrough Performance	Joseph Quinn	Won	
2023	MTV Movie & TV Awards	Best Kick-Ass Cast	Stranger Things	Won	
2023	MTV Movie & TV Awards	Best Musical Moment	"Running Up That Hill"	Nominated	
2023	Screen Actors Guild Awards	Outstanding Performance by a Stunt Ensemble in a Television Series	Stranger Things	Won	
2023	Visual Effects Society Awards	Outstanding Visual Effects in a Photoreal Episode	Jabbar Raisani, Terron Pratt, Niklas Jacobson, Justin Mitchell, Richard E. Perry (for "The Piggyback")	Nominated	
2023	Visual Effects Society Awards	Outstanding Effects Simulations in an Episode, Commercial, or Real-Time Project	Ahmad Ghourab, Gavin Templer, Rachel Ajorque, Eri Ohno (for "Hawkins Destructive Fissures")	Nominated	
