= RR7349 =

- Cover art by Bryan Olson

Studio album by S U R V I V E
- Released: September 27, 2016
- Recorded: January 2015
- Studios: 5th Street Studios, Austin, Texas
- Genres: Synthwave; synthpop; kosmische
- Length: 41:18
- Labels: Relapse; Holodeck
- Producer: Michael Stein

S U R V I V E chronology
MF064 (2014)	RR7349 (2016)

Singles from RR7349
- 1. "A.H.B." Released: July 26, 2016; 2. "Wardenclyffe" Released: August 23, 2016

RR7349 (its cassette release titled HD037) is the third studio album by Texas synthwave group Survive. Completed in January 2015, it wasn't until September 2016 that the album was released by the labels Relapse and Survive's own Holodeck. As with other releases by the band, RR7349 follows a slow-tempo style using elements of dark wave, electro, and intelligent dance music. Reviews of the album from critics were very favorable, some of them highlighting that it has a complex narrative unusual for instrumental electronic music albums. The LP peaked at number 108 on the American Billboard 200 album chart.

== Composition ==
As with other Survive works, the album is a slow tempo synthwave record containing "foggy atmospheres" and many elements of dark wave, electro, and intelligent dance music, AllMusic journalist Paul Simpson wrote. The album has a 1980s film score style a la the works of John Carpenter, Tangerine Dream, Giorgio Moroder, and Vangelis. Simpson described the album's structure as "heavy and spacious," or "heavily detailed without feeling dense or overloaded." Critic Patric Fallon wrote that the LP has two categories of tracks: ones having "predictable structures with the tension and broad scope of soundtrack music" and normal synthpop tracks. Under the Radar analyzed it has a "coloring-in of atmosphere signifying experimentation with the capacity of [analog synths]."

Also like the band's previous releases, RR7349 "explores emotional terrains of uncertainty and irresolution, where well-deep and halogen-bright synthesizers creep and dart between streetlamps and shadows," Thump analyzed. Where the album differs from past Survive albums, however, is its "rigid rockist mentality," where the synthesizers are performed "like guitars" and the "drum machines like a set of Ludwigs," stated Resident Advisor.

Writer Luke Fowler noted that every song on RR7349 "begins with an explosion of synths and drums before breaking down two-thirds of the way through and transitioning to an extended outro." Gigsoup categorized the LP as a three-movement release: its first movement ("A.H.B." to "Dirt") having an "uplifting, exploratory vibe," the second movement ("Wardenclyffe" to "Low Fog") displaying a "boldly identifiable notion of cold-blooded terror looming upon the listener, achieved by the quartet’s mastery of multi-layered synth at varying ranges and frequencies," and the concluding movement ("Copter" to "Cutthroat") having "a sense of embrace and an overcoming of the terror that once loomed."

== Release and promotion ==
Despite being completed in January 2015, RR7349 took a long time for it to get publicly released due to the challenge of finding a label to issue it. Survive was signed to metal label Relapse Records via Timmy Hefner, leader of the metal festival Chaos in Tejas and friends with both Survive and the staff at Relapse. Survive gave Hefner the album, who in turn handed the album over to Relapse. As the group recalled in a 2016 interview, "We decided, why not get our album in front of a million people who wouldn't hear it otherwise? Maybe some of them will like it."

On April 18, 2016, Relapse announced Survive signed to the label, and their next album would be released late in the summer season. However, the date was moved to September for unknown reasons. Exclaim! debuted it via streaming on September 27, 2016. Relapse issued the vinyl and digital editions on September 30, 2016 as RR7349 (its catalog number), while the cassette version was issued on Survive's own label Holodeck the same day HD037 (also its catalog number). On October 26, 2016, the Chris Rusch-directed video for "Copter" was released. Filmed in Austin, Los Angeles, and Croatia, the video is a mix of aerial shots and the group performing in a dark area.

Survive issued an extended play titled RR7387 on November 3, 2016, which features remixes of the album's songs by Lena Willikens, Not Waving, Sam Haar, and Justin K Broadrick. On January 10, 2017, the group released a BitTorrent file containing recordings of one of their live performances of 2011, the RR7349 track "Wardenclyffe" and the video for "Copter" also included. On February 21 and February 22, 2017, Survive performed at the Deaf Institute in Manchester and the Village Underground in London to support RR7349.

== Critical reception ==
Professional ratings
Aggregate scores
Source	Rating
AnyDecentMusic?	7.2/10
Metacritic	81/100
Review scores
Source	Rating
AllMusic	4/5 stars
Austin Chronicle	4/5 stars
Consequence of Sound	B+
Exclaim!	8/10
Now	3/5 stars
Pitchfork	7.4/10
PopMatters	8/10 stars
Resident Advisor	3.5/5
Spectrum Culture	3.75/5 stars
Under the Radar	7.5/10 stars

Honoring RR7349 as "one of 2016’s most cinematic and compelling electronic albums," Fowler claimed it had "the sheer confidence of a debut [album]," his only minor criticism being the lack of structural variety between tracks. Simpson praised RR7349 as Survive's "most accomplished work," analogizing it as a "silver screen debut by a director whose films previously went straight to video (or on-demand streaming)." The Line of Best Fit called it "an authentic, muddy footprint in the world of poorly produced electronic music saturating our airwaves," reasoning that "they're pushing the boundaries and reinterpreting music in an exciting way within the digital age, making us pause to rethink and reminisce what was special about a specific age of music and the amazing technology that has come before."

Some critics highlighted the complexity and progressiveness of the songwriting on RR7349 unusual for most artists to have. More specifically, they honored it for being a non-dance electronic record that had a dynamic narrative executed only from instrumentals. Spectrum Culture praised it as an album meant to be listened to from start to end, which results in "an exercise in vision and craft that should be appreciated by those who seek out challenging music." The Austin Chronicle compared it to the works of Boards of Canada and Trent Reznor in that it "mingles the tangible with the abstract to spur a novel meld of both imaginative atmosphere and gripping substance." Exclaim! commended the record as "an album that never repeats itself, offering up a work that plays out more like a multi-chaptered book than some simple '80s homage that's jumped the shark." PopMatters claimed, "Normally, nostalgia is synonymous with a lack of imagination, but that is not the case here. Rather, there is sincerity and depth here that saves it from being a semi-ironic nostalgia exercise."

RR7349 also garnered a few mixed reviews. Earbuddy felt most of the music was "just being pretty neat" and "demand[ed] visuals to give it context," while Now described it as a "suite of discrete moods than a cycle of songs [...] too ornamented to be background music but without enough conceptual underpinning to create a world of its own."

== Year-end list rankings ==
Publication	Rank
AllMusic (Electronic)	*
Gorilla vs. Bear	19
The New Zealand Herald	20
Piccadilly Records	49
PopMatters (Electronic)	7
Pretty Much Amazing	42
"*" indicates an unordered list.

== Track listing ==
RR7349
No.	Title	Length
1.	"A.H.B."	4:25
2.	"Other"	3:43
3.	"Dirt"	5:06
4.	"High Rise"	3:59
5.	"Wardenclyffe"	4:08
6.	"Sorcerer"	4:39
7.	"Low Fog"	4:40
8.	"Copter"	6:36
9.	"Cutthroat"	4:02
Total length:		41:18

RR7387
No.	Title	Length
1.	"Cutthroat" (Lena Willikens remix)	7:22
2.	"High Rise" (Not Waving remix)	6:15
3.	"Wardenclyffe" (Sam Haar remix)	8:54
4.	"Other" (JK FLESH remix)	4:29
Total length:		27:00

== Release history ==
Region	Date	Format(s)	Label
Worldwide	September 27, 2016	Streaming	Exclaim!
Worldwide	September 30, 2016	CD; digital download; vinyl	Relapse
Worldwide	September 30, 2016	Cassette	Holodeck

== Charts ==
Chart (2016)	Peak position
UK Independent Album Breakers (OCC)	7
US Billboard 200	108
US Dance/Electronic Albums (Billboard)	2
US Independent Albums (Billboard)	15
US Heatseekers Albums (Billboard)	1
