= Survive (band) =

American electronic band

S U R V I V E
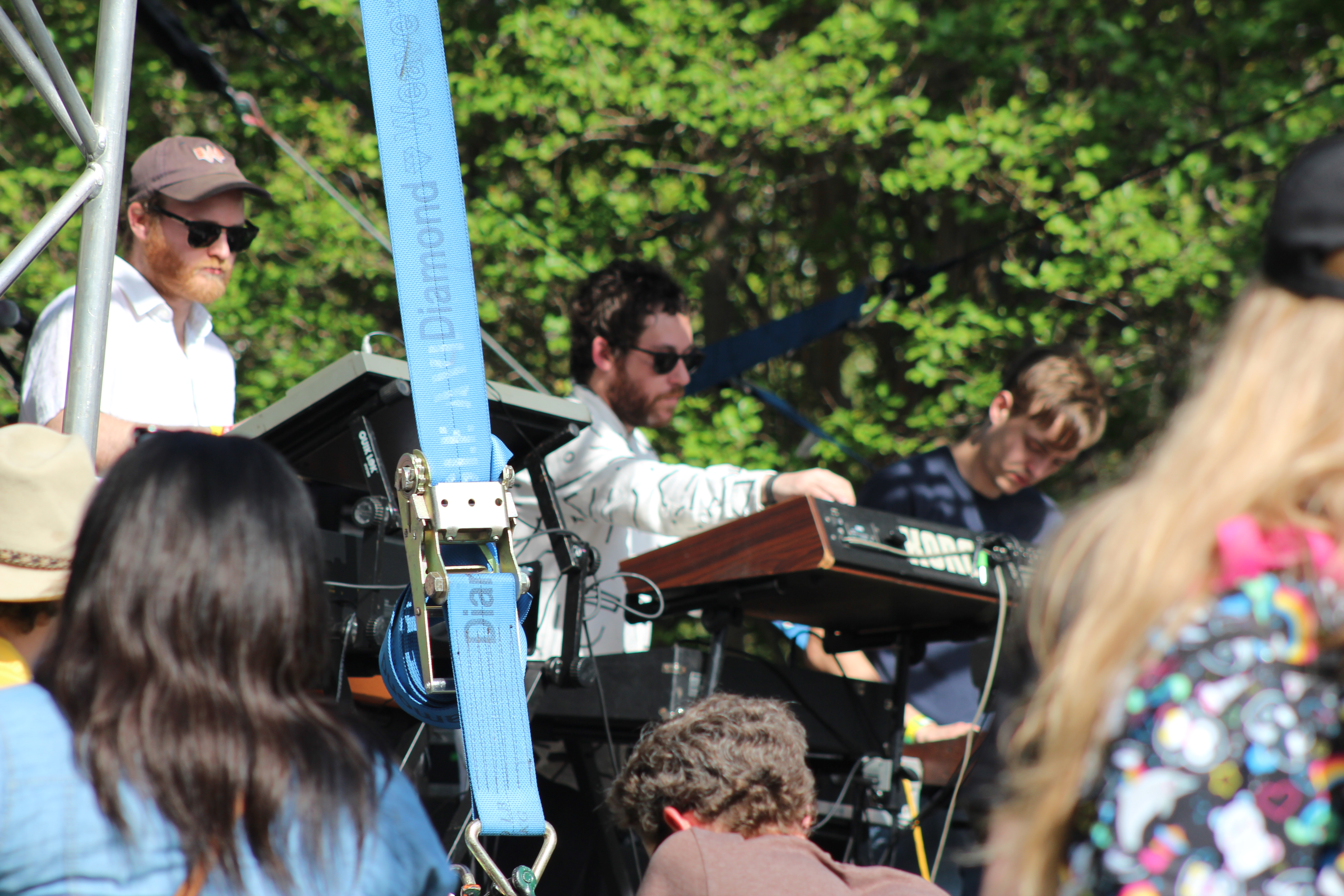
- SXSW 21 March 2017

Background information
- Origin: Austin, Texas, United States
- Genres: Electronic; synthwave
- Instruments: Korg Mono/Poly; Roland SH-101; ARP Odyssey; Elektron Analog Keys; Sequential Prophet-6; Sequential Circuits Six-Trak
- Years active: 2009–present
- Labels: Relapse Records; Holodeck; Monofonus Press; Mannequin; Light Lodge
- Members: Kyle Dixon; Michael Stein; Mark Donica; Adam Jones

Survive (often styled S U R V I V E) is an American electronic band formed in 2009 in Austin, Texas. Its members are Kyle Dixon, Michael Stein, Adam Jones, and Mark Donica. Dixon and Stein compose and produce as a duo and are best known for composing the score to the Netflix series Stranger Things, which brought them wider recognition. The band produces synth-heavy, horror-score-influenced compositions using drum machines and analog synthesizers across a range of single, EP, and LP releases.

== Film soundtracks ==
Survive contributed to the soundtrack for the indie horror film The Guest.

The band gained wider fame after members Dixon and Stein were hired to compose the musical score Music of Stranger Things for the Netflix supernatural horror hit series Stranger Things.

Both volumes of the soundtrack were nominated individually for the Best Score Soundtrack Category for the 2017 Grammy Awards, though neither won. 2017 saw Dixon and Stein also nominated for an ASCAP award as a result of their soundtrack work. In September 2017, Dixon and Stein won the Emmy Award for Outstanding Original Main Title Theme Music for their work on the Stranger Things theme.

2017 has also seen the band curate the music for Sensory, a multi-dimensional immersive restaurant experience' at Sugar Hill Mountain Festival in Melbourne, Australia.

== Discography ==
=== Albums ===
| Title | Album details |
|---|---|
| Mnq026; HD015 | Release date: 28 May 2012; Label: Mannequin Records, Holodeck Records; Formats: CD, Digital Download, 12" Vinyl; Songs: Deserted Skies - Floating Cube - To Light Alone I Bow - Hourglass - Omniverse - Black Mollies - Scalar Wave - Shunting Yard - Dirge |
| HD009 | Release date: 4 September 2012; Label: Holodeck Records; Formats: cassette; Songs: cschz 01 - cschz 02 |
| RR7349 | Release date: 30 September 2016; Label: Relapse Records; Formats: CD, digital download, 12" vinyl; Songs: A.H.B - Other - Dirt - High Rise - Wardenclyffe - Sorcerer - Low Fog - Copter - Cutthroat |
| RR7400: LA041717 | Release date: 3 August 2018; Label: Relapse Records; Formats: Digital Download, 12" Vinyl; Songs: Floating Cube (Los Angeles - 4-17-17) - Omniverse (Los Angeles - 4-17-17) - Sorcerer (Los Angeles - 4-17-17) - Cutthroat (Los Angeles - 4-17-17) - Holographic (Los Angeles - 4-17-17) - Black Mollies (Los Angeles - 4-17-17) - Parousia (Los Angeles - 4-17-17) - Wardenclyffe (Los Angeles - 4-17-17) - Copter (Los Angeles - 4-17-17) |

=== Extended plays & tapes ===
| Year | Title | Label |
|---|---|---|
| 2010 | BATH017 (As part of Dark of Night Compilation) | Bathetic Records |
| 2010 | LLR002 | Light Lodge |
| 2011 | LT019 | Living Tapes |
| 2012 | TLLT21 | To Lose La Track |
| 2013 | HD009 | Holodeck Records 2016 HD037 Holodeck Records |
| 2014 | MF064 | Monofonus Press |

=== Music videos ===
| Title | Year | Ref |
|---|---|---|
| Floating Cube | 2013 | |
| Omniverse | 2015 | |
| Copter | 2016 | |

=== Soundtracks ===
| Title | Details |
|---|---|
| Stranger Things (season 1) | Released (Vol. 1): 12 August 2016; Released (Vol. 2): 19 August 2016 |
| Stranger Things (season 2) | Released: 20 October 2017 |
| Stranger Things (season 3) | Released: 28 June 2019 |
| Stranger Things (season 4) | Released: 1 July 2022 |
| The Retaliators (Original Motion Picture Score) | Released: 21 October 2022 |
| Stranger Things (season 5) | Released: 1 January 2025 |

== Awards and nominations ==
Awards and nominations
| Year | Award | Category | Nominated work | Result | Ref. |
|---|---|---|---|---|---|
| 2017 | Primetime Emmy Award | Outstanding Original Main Title Theme Music | Stranger Things | Won | |
| 2017 | Grammy Award | Best Score Soundtrack for Visual Media | Stranger Things, Vol. 1 | Nominated | |
| 2017 | Grammy Award | Best Score Soundtrack for Visual Media | Stranger Things, Vol. 2 | Nominated | |
| 2017 | ASCAP Composers' Choice Awards | TV Composer(s) of the Year | Kyle Dixon and Michael Stein for Stranger Things | Nominated | |
| 2017 | World Soundtrack Awards | Television Composer of the Year | Kyle Dixon and Michael Stein for Stranger Things | Nominated | |
| 2018 | Venice Film Festival | Grand Jury Prize for Best Virtual Reality Immersive Story | Spheres (as composers) | Won | |
| 2018 | Hollywood Music in Media Awards | Original Score – Short Film | Spheres | Nominated | |
| 2021 | Hollywood Music in Media Awards | Original Score – Independent Film | The Hole in the Fence | Nominated | |
