= Stranger Things 3 (soundtrack) =

Soundtrack album by Kyle Dixon and Michael Stein
- Released: June 28, 2019
- Genre: Electronic
- Length: 1:22:25
- Labels: Lakeshore; Invada
- Producers: Kyle Dixon; Michael Stein

The original soundtrack album for the third season of the Netflix series Stranger Things, titled Stranger Things 3, was released digitally on June 28, 2019, via Lakeshore and Invada Records. Like the previous two seasons, the soundtrack was composed by Kyle Dixon and Michael Stein of the electronic band Survive. The album was also released on physical formats such as CD, vinyl, and cassette.

== Composition ==
In a press release that accompanied the announcement of the score's release, Dixon and Stein disclosed that they made an album "that doesn't feel like a 'score' necessarily, but one that feels more like a stand-alone record than a collection of brief cues. We've incorporated the main narrative elements of the series and stayed true to the original sound while at the same time expanding on our musical palette – we often pushed it to the limit." They also stated that they "made an effort to curate this album to showcase the moments we think are really special."

== Track listing ==
No.	Title	Length
1.	"Boys and Girls"	1:49
2.	"I Like Presents Too"	1:26
3.	"Starcourt"	3:04
4.	"Blank Makes You Crazy"	1:06
5.	"I Need You to Trust Me"	1:21
6.	"You're a Fighter"	4:20
7.	"The Ceiling is Beautiful"	2:51
8.	"The First I love You"	2:26
9.	"Rats"	4:35
10.	"What Did You Do to Him?"	2:07
11.	"Find the Source"	1:18
12.	"The Silver Cat Feeds"	1:11
13.	"Heather's"	1:38
14.	"William"	2:11
15.	"Destroying the Castle"	1:48
16.	"In the Void"	1:29
17.	"Tammy"	3:01
18.	"Mirkwood"	2:38
19.	"Portal Drill"	1:47
20.	"Happy Screams"	1:25
21.	"Ruins"	2:02
22.	"It's Just Ice"	4:04
23.	"The Door is Opening"	1:19
24.	"Planck's Constant"	1:19
25.	"She's Gone Home"	0:38
26.	"Seven Feet"	1:54
27.	"The Week Is Long"	2:10
28.	"Sauna Test"	0:59
29.	"Six Facts"	2:03
30.	"The Trees Are Moving"	1:15
31.	"On Their Tracks"	0:42
32.	"Not Chinese Food"	1:49
33.	"Blueprints"	2:10
34.	"Land Deeds"	1:08
35.	"Not Kids Anymore"	0:52
36.	"Code Red"	2:03
37.	"Feel Safe"	2:18
38.	"He's Here"	2:35
39.	"Scoops Troop"	1:45
40.	"We Don't Understand Each Other"	2:47
41.	"Aftermath"	3:05
Total length:		1:22:25

== Charts ==
Chart (2019)	Peak position
German Albums (Offizielle Top 100)	99
Scottish Albums (Official Charts)	64
UK Independent Albums (Official Charts)	18
UK Soundtrack Albums (Official Charts)	5
US Current Albums (Billboard)	47
US Independent Albums (Billboard)	18
US Soundtrack Albums (Billboard)	21

Chart (2026)	Peak position
Portuguese Albums (AFP)	126
