= Stranger Things 4 (soundtrack) =

Soundtrack album by Kyle Dixon and Michael Stein
- Released: July 1, 2022
- Genre: Soundtrack
- Length: 3:01:31
- Labels: Lakeshore; Invada
- Producers: Kyle Dixon; Michael Stein

The original soundtrack album for the fourth season of the Netflix series Stranger Things, titled Stranger Things 4, was released digitally on July 1, 2022, via Lakeshore and Invada Records. Like the previous three seasons, the soundtrack was composed by Kyle Dixon and Michael Stein of the electronic band Survive. The album will also be released on physical formats such as CD and vinyl in two separate volumes, as the sheer length of the eighty-track score far exceeds the capacity of a single compact disc or a two-disc vinyl set. These were released on December 2, 2022.

== Track listing ==
Stranger Things 4 – Vol. 1
No.	Title	Length
1.	"What's the Internet?"	2:48
2.	"I wouldn't remember me either."	1:50
3.	"Teens"	2:06
4.	"Journalistic Instinct"	2:37
5.	"100% Convinced"	1:05
6.	"In the closet (at Rink O Mania)"	1:32
7.	"Does that make us friends?"	3:14
8.	"My BOOBS hurt."	1:09
9.	"Unambiguous True Love"	2:17
10.	"Stuck in 1983"	2:57
11.	"Hawkins National Lab"	2:02
12.	"Hellfire Club"	2:04
13.	"Buried Memories"	2:49
14.	"Fancy Bomb"	1:48
15.	"We are NOT heroes."	3:06
16.	"Nine Feet Tall"	1:38
17.	"Hail Lord Vecna"	1:59
18.	"Powerful Psychic Connection"	2:02
19.	"Ruth, Nevada"	0:45
20.	"Hellfire Isn't A Cult"	1:24
21.	"I Know What I Saw"	2:08
22.	"Curfew"	1:29
23.	"You're Regressing Eleven"	3:32
24.	"Letter to Willy"	3:47
25.	"Palm Tree Delight"	1:54
26.	"Musso"	2:12
27.	"Brenner's Little Pet"	2:18
28.	"Mr. Fibbly"	1:37
29.	"It's just a clock, right?"	2:17
30.	"Welcome to Kamchatka"	2:14
31.	"A Nightmare Far Worse"	3:31
32.	"Caught a Body at the Munsen Trailer"	1:13
33.	"A War is coming to Hawkins"	1:55
34.	"The Elephant"	2:16
35.	"Hurtling Towards a Gruesome Death"	1:33
36.	"Barefoot in the snow"	1:45
37.	"Kills you in your dreams"	1:20
38.	"The Shire is Burning"	0:55
39.	"Blood Balloons"	1:09
40.	"Burning Baby"	0:59
41.	"Mugshot"	2:30
42.	"There are some things worse than ghosts..."	4:47
43.	"A memory within a memory"	3:04

Stranger Things 4 – Vol. 2
No.	Title	Length
1.	"A Proper Thump"	1:58
2.	"Hiiiiiiiii"	2:38
3.	"Still Dizzy"	1:46
4.	"Reign Fire From Above"	1:34
5.	"Religious American"	2:14
6.	"Surf that Tasty Pie"	2:30
7.	"Follow me into Death"	1:54
8.	"Project Nina"	1:52
9.	"Being Different"	4:30
10.	"Undressing"	1:13
11.	"I Want You To Watch"	1:34
12.	"A Realm Unspoiled by Mankind"	4:22
13.	"Four Gates"	2:09
14.	"Sleeping Dracula"	3:10
15.	"Praying something will happen to me"	3:54
16.	"Stained Glass Roses"	2:34
17.	"One"	1:56
18.	"Gates of Kamchatka"	1:05
19.	"Top Secret Location"	1:53
20.	"You're The Heart"	3:15
21.	"Sleepyhead"	1:52
22.	"Skull Rock"	1:50
23.	"Spellcaster"	3:58
24.	"You Should Go East"	1:44
25.	"Unfortunate Development"	2:22
26.	"Slashing the Tires"	1:30
27.	"Soteria"	1:18
28.	"Elvis Cloned by Aliens"	1:35
29.	"[delicate, intense music playing…]"	3:26
30.	"Demogorgons in Tanks"	1:28
31.	"The Cure"	3:38
32.	"Patient Confidentiality"	2:00
33.	"Stay Calm, Focus on the Game"	2:28
34.	"It's Time Max"	1:58
35.	"All Evil Must Have A Home"	4:40
36.	"Flashlights, Flashlights"	2:18
37.	"You Have Already Lost"	4:31

== Charts ==
Chart performance for Stranger Things 4 (soundtrack)
Chart (2022)	Peak position
New Zealand Albums (RMNZ)	6

== Certifications ==
Certifications for Stranger Things 4 (soundtrack)
Region	Certification	Certified units/sales
New Zealand (RMNZ)	2× Platinum	30,000^{‡}
^{‡} Sales+streaming figures based on certification alone.
