= Basic Being Basic =

2025 single by Djo

Single by Djo

from the album The Crux
- Released: January 24, 2025
- Studio: Electric Lady (New York City)
- Genre: Synth-pop; indie pop
- Length: 2:38
- Label: Djo Music (via AWAL)
- Songwriters: Joe Keery; Adam Thein
- Producers: Joe Keery; Adam Thein

Djo singles chronology
"End of Beginning" (2024)	"Basic Being Basic" (2025)	"Delete Ya" (2025)

Lyric video
- "Basic Being Basic" on YouTube

"Basic Being Basic" is a song by the American actor and musician Joe Keery, under his alias Djo. It was released independently under AWAL on January 24, 2025, as the lead single from his third studio album, The Crux (2025). Written and produced by Keery and his frequent collaborator Adam Thein, "Basic Being Basic" is a synth-pop and indie pop song with lyrics focusing on criticism of the human posturing and online decisions.

An accompanying lyric video premiered on the same date as the single's release. Upon its release, music critics highlighted Keery's use of falsetto on the track. Commercially, it peaked within the top 30 on digital and airplay charts in New Zealand and the United States. Keery performed "Basic Being Basic" on The Tonight Show Starring Jimmy Fallon and as part of Triple J's Like a Version series.

== Background and release ==
Joe Keery's second studio album as Djo, titled Decide, spawned the single "End of Beginning" (2024), which became the sixth song with the most streams in 2024. It charted in 41 countries, including in the United States with a peak at number 11, and received certifications in nearly 20 nations. Keery then started working on its follow-up. In early January 2025, the magazine Dork reported the possibility of new music from the singer coming soon.

On January 24, 2025, Keery announced his third studio album as Djo, titled The Crux, and revealed its cover artwork and track listing, in which the second song is titled "Basic Being Basic". The track was released independently through AWAL as the album's lead single on the same date, alongside an accompanying lyric video. The video sees a group of people having lunch and talking before they leave and Keery appears looking at the camera. The singer subsequently declared that he would be embarking on the Back on You World Tour, which took place in North America and Europe in the same year and included the American rock band Post Animal as the supporting act.

On April 11, 2025, the track was added to Fortnite Festival as a purchasable Jam Track.

== Composition ==
As part of The Crux, "Basic Being Basic" was written and produced by Keery and his frequent collaborator Adam Thein at Electric Lady Studios in New York City. Thein played synthesizers while Emma Keery, Kate Keery, and Austin Christy provided background vocals. Manny Marroquin served as the mixing engineer and Heba Kadry was the mastering engineer. The track runs for two minutes and thirty-eight seconds.

Music critics categorized "Basic Being Basic" as a synth-pop and indie pop song. Described by Nylon's Dylan Kickham as "groovy", its production includes guitars and Oberheim OB-8 synthesizers, while Keery uses a falsetto vocal register. The track opens with a sound that Rolling Stone's Larisha Paul found reminiscent of "arcade aliens being annihilated in Space Invaders". The lyrical content of "Basic Being Basic" focuses on a criticism of the human posturing online and in general. He mentions people's "understated nothingness" and the obsession with screens rather than tangible things. In a press release, Keery described the song as "kind of a shot fired to anyone who's trying to be of the moment". In the hook, he sings: "I think you're scared of being basic."

== Reception ==
Kickham opined that the track is "an equally catchy single" as "End of Beginning", and highlighted Keery's "impressive" falsetto. Matt Mitchell of Paste described it as a "red-hot song of the year contender" and also praised the singer's falsetto. Additionally, the critic described a line about Vera Bradley as "deliciously cheeky". Commercially, "Basic Being Basic" peaked at number 11 on the New Zealand Hot Singles chart issued for January 31, 2025. It reached numbers 24 and 30 on the US Rock Airplay and Hot Rock & Alternative Songs charts, respectively, and reached the peak position of the US Alternative Airplay chart.

== Live performances ==
Keery performed the song live for the first time on January 29, 2025, on The Tonight Show Starring Jimmy Fallon accompanied by a band and background singers. Keery included "Basic Being Basic" on his recording for the Triple J's Like a Version series, where he also covered "Gasoline" (2021) by the American band Haim.

== Charts ==
=== Weekly charts ===
Weekly chart performance for "Basic Being Basic"
Chart (2025–2026)	Peak position
Canada Modern Rock (Billboard Canada)	35
Colombia Anglo Airplay (Monitor Latino)	9
Ireland (IRMA)	81
Lithuania Airplay (TopHit)	83
New Zealand Hot Singles (RMNZ)	11
UK Singles (Official Charts)	62
UK Indie (Official Charts)	16
US Hot Rock & Alternative Songs (Billboard)	28
US Rock & Alternative Airplay (Billboard)	15

=== Monthly charts ===
Monthly chart performance for "Basic Being Basic"
Chart (2025)	Peak position
Lithuania Airplay (TopHit)	89

=== Year-end charts ===
Year-end chart performance for "Basic Being Basic"
Chart (2025)	Position
US Rock & Alternative Airplay (Billboard)	33

== Release history ==
Release dates and format(s) for "Basic Being Basic"
Region	Date	Format(s)	Label	Ref.
Various	January 24, 2025	Digital download; streaming	AWAL	
United States	January 24, 2025	Modern rock	AWAL	
