= Back on You World Tour =

2025 concert tour by Djo

- Tour by Djo
- Location: Europe; North America; Oceania
- Associated album: The Crux
- Start date: February 6, 2025
- End date: October 21, 2025
- Legs: 4
- No. of shows: 70
- Supporting acts: Post Animal; The Lazy Eyes; Velvet Trip

Djo concert chronology
- Back on You World Tour (2025); South America & Mexico Tour (2026)

The Back on You World Tour is a concert tour by American actor and musician Joe Keery under the stage name Djo, in support of his third studio album, The Crux (2025). It began on February 6, 2025, at the Laneway Festival in Auckland, with shows across Oceania, North America and Europe, and concluded in Los Angeles on October 21, 2025. The full tour comprised 70 shows. Keery's old band, Post Animal, served as the opening act for the majority of the US and European shows. The Lazy Eyes and Velvet Trip served as the opening act exclusively for the Sydney show.

== Background ==
On January 24, 2025, Djo formally announced the tour, with 41 shows across Oceania, North America and Europe from February through June 2025. Tickets went on sale on January 31. The announcement for his third studio album The Crux (2025) and the release of his first single for the album titled "Basic Being Basic" were released in conjunction with the tour announcement. On January 29, 2025, extra dates for Portland, Brooklyn, London and Amsterdam were added due to demand, as well as a venue change in Detroit to meet bigger demand. On February 13, 2025, Djo added two more dates to the tour in Pomona and Del Mar as part of Goldenvoice's Coachella side shows. Besides the official run of the tour, nine dates for North America were revealed on May 2, 2025. The shows were billed as the Another Bite Tour, with Post Animal again serving as the opening act before starting their own headlining tour. On May 6, 2025, Djo announced an extra date for Los Angeles due to demand. On the same day, he also was announced as a performer at the Austin City Limits Music Festival.

== Set list ==
The following set list is obtained from the April 19, 2025, show in Phoenix. It is not intended to represent all dates throughout the tour.

1. "Runner"
2. "Gloom"
3. "Link"
4. "Lonesome Is a State of Mind"
5. "Basic Being Basic"
6. "Figure You Out"
7. "Delete Ya"
8. "Fly"
9. "Roddy"
10. "Fool"
11. "Charlie's Garden"
12. "Chateau (Feel Alright)"
13. "Potion"
14. "Crux"
15. "End of Beginning"
  Encore
16. "Back on You"
17. "Flash Mountain"

== Tour dates ==
List of 2025 concerts, showing date, city, country, venue, opening acts
Date (2025)	City	Country	Venue	Opening act(s)
February 6 (Note: This concert is part of Laneway Festival.)	Auckland	New Zealand	Western Springs Stadium	—N/a
February 8	Brisbane	Australia	Brisbane Showgrounds	—N/a
February 9	Sydney	Australia	Centennial Parklands	—N/a
February 12	Sydney	Australia	Enmore Theatre	The Lazy Eyes; Velvet Trip
February 14	Melbourne	Australia	Flemington Racecourse	—N/a
February 15	Adelaide	Australia	Bonython Park	—N/a
February 16	Perth	Australia	Wellington Square	—N/a
April 3	Portland	United States	Revolution Hall	Post Animal
April 4	Portland	United States	Revolution Hall	Post Animal
April 5	Portland	United States	Revolution Hall	Post Animal
April 7	Vancouver	Canada	PNE Forum (Note: The venue for the show on April 7, 2025, is upgraded from the Commodore Ballroom following high demand.)	Post Animal
April 8	Seattle	United States	Paramount Theatre	Post Animal
April 10	Oakland	United States	Fox Oakland Theatre	Post Animal
April 11 (Note: The concerts on April 11 and April 18, 2025, are part of the Coachella Valley Music and Arts Festival.)	Indio	United States	Empire Polo Club	—N/a
April 15	Pomona	United States	Fox Theater Pomona	Post Animal
April 16	Del Mar	United States	The Sound	Post Animal
April 18	Indio	United States	Empire Polo Club	—N/a
April 19	Phoenix	United States	The Van Buren	Post Animal
April 21	Salt Lake City	United States	The Complex	Post Animal
April 23	Denver	United States	Mission Ballroom	Post Animal
April 25	Madison	United States	The Sylvee	Post Animal
April 26	Saint Paul	United States	Palace Theatre	Post Animal
April 28	Detroit	United States	Detroit Masonic Temple (Note: The venue for the show on April 28, 2025, is upgraded from the Royal Oak Music Theatre following high demand.)	Post Animal
April 29	Toronto	Canada	History	Post Animal
May 1	Washington, D.C.	United States	The Anthem	Post Animal
May 2	Boston	United States	Roadrunner	Post Animal
May 3	Philadelphia	United States	Franklin Music Hall	Post Animal
May 5	Brooklyn	United States	Brooklyn Steel	Post Animal
May 6	Brooklyn	United States	Brooklyn Steel	Post Animal
May 7	Brooklyn	United States	Brooklyn Steel	Post Animal
June 1	Dublin	Ireland	3Olympia Theatre	Post Animal
June 2	Glasgow	Scotland	O_{2} Academy Glasgow	Post Animal
June 3	Manchester	England	O_{2} Victoria Warehouse	Post Animal
June 5	London	England	O_{2} Forum Kentish Town	Post Animal
June 6	London	England	O_{2} Forum Kentish Town	Post Animal
June 7	London	England	O_{2} Forum Kentish Town	Post Animal
June 10	Copenhagen	Denmark	Poolen	Post Animal
June 11	Oslo	Norway	Sentrum Scene	Post Animal
June 13	Stockholm	Sweden	Annexet	Post Animal
June 15 (Note: This concert is part of Best Kept Secret.)	Hilvarenbeek	Netherlands	Beekse Bergen	—N/a
June 16	Cologne	Germany	E-Werk	Post Animal
June 17	Berlin	Germany	Huxley's	Post Animal
June 18	Warsaw	Poland	Progresja	Post Animal
June 20 (Note: This concert is part of Hurricane Festival.)	Scheeßel	Germany	Eichenring	—N/a
June 21 (Note: This concert is part of Southside Festival.)	Neuhausen ob Eck	Germany	Neuhausen ob Eck Airfield	—N/a
June 23	Paris	France	Élysée Montmartre	Post Animal
June 24	Amsterdam	Netherlands	Paradiso	Post Animal
June 25	Amsterdam	Netherlands	Paradiso	Post Animal
June 27 (Note: Opening for Noah Kahan.)	Cardiff	Wales	Blackweir Fields	—N/a
June 29 (Note: This concert is part of Glastonbury Festival.)	Pilton	England	Worthy Farm	—N/a
July 1 (Note: Opening for Noah Kahan.)	Dublin	Ireland	Marlay Park	—N/a
July 31	Chicago	United States	The Salt Shed	Post Animal
August 1 (Note: This concert is part of Lollapalooza.)	Chicago	United States	Grant Park	—N/a
September 26 (Note: The concerts on September 26 and September 28, 2025, are part of the All Things Go Music Festival.)	Forest Hills	United States	Forest Hills Stadium	—N/a
September 27	New Haven	United States	College Street Music Hall	Post Animal
September 28	Columbia	United States	Merriweather Post Pavilion	—N/a
September 30 (Note: Billed as Another Bite Tour.)	Asheville	United States	Asheville Yards Amphitheater	Post Animal
October 1	Cumberland (Note: Labeled as Atlanta in promotional material.)	United States	Coca-Cola Roxy	Post Animal
October 2	Nashville	United States	The Pinnacle	Post Animal
October 4 (Note: The concerts on October 4 and October 11, 2025, are part of the Austin City Limits Music Festival.)	Austin	United States	Zilker Park	—N/a
October 5	Houston	United States	Lawn at White Oak Music Hall	Post Animal
October 7	Kansas City	United States	Grinders KC	Post Animal
October 9	Irving	United States	The Pavilion at Toyota Music Factory	Post Animal
October 11	Austin	United States	Zilker Park	—N/a
October 13	Oklahoma City	United States	The Criterion	Post Animal
October 15	Phoenix	United States	Arizona Financial Theatre	Post Animal
October 17	Sacramento	United States	Channel 24	Post Animal
October 18	Berkeley	United States	The Greek Theatre	Post Animal
October 20	Los Angeles	United States	Greek Theatre	Post Animal
October 21	Los Angeles	United States	Greek Theatre	Post Animal
