= The Crux (Djo album) =

2025 studio album by Djo

- Standard edition cover

Studio album by Djo
- Released: April 4, 2025
- Studio: Electric Lady (New York City)
- Genres: Pop rock; indie rock
- Length: 45:13
- Label: Djo Music (via AWAL)
- Producers: Joe Keery; Adam Thein

Djo chronology
Decide (2022)	The Crux (2025)	The Crux Deluxe (2025)

Singles from The Crux
- 1. "Basic Being Basic" Released: January 24, 2025; 2. "Delete Ya" Released: February 27, 2025; 3. "Potion" Released: April 2, 2025

The Crux is the third studio album by the American actor and musician Joe Keery, under his stage name Djo. It was released independently under AWAL on April 4, 2025, and served as the follow-up to his previous album, Decide (2022). Keery co-produced The Crux with his frequent collaborator Adam Thein at Electric Lady Studios in New York City. Three singles—"Basic Being Basic", "Delete Ya", and "Potion"—preceded the album. Upon its release, it was met with generally favorable reception from music critics. To promote The Crux, Keery embarked on the Back on You World Tour and Another Bite Tour between February and October 2025.

On September 12, 2025, The Crux Deluxe, a companion album containing 12 new tracks, was released. Despite the Deluxe label, Keery stated that he does not consider it a reissue of The Crux.

== Background ==
Joe Keery saw breakthrough success in his musical career, under the alias Djo, with the sleeper hit "End of Beginning" (2022). One of the singles from his second studio album, Decide (2022), it was the sixth song with the most streams in 2024 and charted in 41 countries, including in the United States with a peak at number 11. It also received certifications in nearly 20 nations. Keery started teasing his third album on social media at the beginning of 2025.

== Production and composition ==
Keery worked with his frequent collaborator Adam Thein for The Crux. They co-produced the album at Electric Lady Studios in New York City. According to DIY, the lyrical themes center on "a hotel housing guests who are all [...] at crossroads in their life".

== Release ==
On January 24, 2025, Keery announced his third album, The Crux, and revealed its track listing and cover artwork. He also released its lead single, "Basic Being Basic", and performed it on The Tonight Show Starring Jimmy Fallon four days later. The album was supported by a concert tour titled Back on You World Tour between February and June 2025, which passed through North America, Europe, and Australia. The American band Post Animal, which Keery was part before his solo career and later rejoined, served as the opening act. "Delete Ya" was released as the second single on February 27, 2025, followed by "Potion" on April 2. The Crux was released on April 4, 2025, via the distribution company AWAL.

== Commercial performance ==
The Crux debuted at number 50 on the US Billboard 200, including number 11 on the Independent Albums and number 10 on the Top Alternative & Rock Albums charts selling 8,000 pure album sales. As of July 2025, the album has sold 79,000 equivalent album units in the US.

== Critical reception ==
Professional ratings
Aggregate scores
Source	Rating
AnyDecentMusic?	7.4/10
Metacritic	73/100
Review scores
Source	Rating
AllMusic	4.5/5 stars
Clash	8/10
DIY	4.5/5 stars
Dork	4/5
The Line of Best Fit	8/10
Paste	8.2/10
Pitchfork	5.9/10
Rolling Stone	3.5/5 stars
Under the Radar	7.5/10

On the review aggregator site Metacritic, The Crux received a weighted mean score of 73 out of 100 based on 10 critics' reviews, indicating "generally favorable" reviews. The music website Pitchfork gave the album a 5.9 out of 10, praising its "vibey prompts", while simultaneously criticizing the album for its "tendency to mistake mere observation for insight" and for being "frictionless" and "uncanny". Rolling Stone awarded the album 3.5 stars, referring to it as "the best music of his career". Paste's Mariel Fechik called The Crux "instrumentally lush and expansive," which offers a "vivid warmth to the album's sound." Alfie Verity at Under the Radar described the album as "a well pruned garden of musical history centered around Djo’s charming storytelling and personality." The site AnyDecentMusic? gave it a score of 7.4 out of 10, based on their assessment of the critical consensus from 11 reviews. On November 7, 2025, The Crux received a 2026 GRAMMYs nomination for Best Album Cover.

Select year-end rankings
Publication	List	Rank	Ref.
Entertainment Weekly	10 Best Albums of 2025	10	
AllMusic	Best Albums of 2025	-	
Dork	Albums of the Year 2025	10	
Vogue	45 Best Albums of 2025	-	

== Track listing ==
All tracks are written by Joe Keery; "Lonesome Is a State of Mind", "Delete Ya", and "Egg" also written with Adam Thein.

The Crux track listing
No.	Title	Length
1.	"Lonesome Is a State of Mind"	4:19
2.	"Basic Being Basic"	2:38
3.	"Link"	3:15
4.	"Potion"	2:47
5.	"Delete Ya"	3:23
6.	"Egg"	4:35
7.	"Fly"	5:25
8.	"Charlie's Garden"	3:25
9.	"Gap Tooth Smile"	2:58
10.	"Golden Line"	3:22
11.	"Back on You"	5:23
12.	"Crux"	3:43
Total length:		45:13

== Personnel ==
Credits adapted from Tidal.

- Joe Keery – lead vocals, production (all tracks); electric guitar (tracks 1, 3–9, 11), acoustic guitars (tracks 1, 2, 4, 6–8, 11), drums (tracks 1, 4, 6, 10, 11), Mellotron (tracks 1, 4, 7, 10), bass guitar (tracks 1, 3–6, 11), piano (tracks 8, 12)
- Adam Thein – production (all tracks), piano (tracks 1, 5, 6, 8, 10, 11), synthesizer (2, 3), additional instrumentation (4), bass guitar (7, 9)
- Heba Kadry – mastering
- Manny Marroquin – mixing
- John Rooney – engineer, additional production (tracks 2, 5, 7, 11)
- Emma Keery – background vocals (tracks 1–3, 10, 11)
- Kate Keery – background vocals (tracks 1–3, 10, 11)
- Lizzy Keery – stomps (track 11), claps (track 11)
- Wesley Toledo – drums (tracks 1, 3, 5–9, 11, 12), background vocals (tracks 3, 6, 8, 9, 11, 12)
- Austin Christy – assistant engineer, background vocals (tracks 1–3, 6, 8, 11)
- Zach Brown – engineer (track 8)
- Zem Audu – saxophone (track 6)
- Ana Monwah Lei – cello (track 7)
- Sally Gorski – violin (track 7)
- Charlie Heaton – additional instrumentation (track 8), spoken word vocals (track 8)
- Josh Shpak – piccolo (track 8)
- Rob Moose – violin (track 10)
- Javier Reyes – acoustic guitar (track 12), background vocals (tracks 11, 12), Wurlitzer (track 12)
- Matt Williams – 12-string acoustic guitar (track 12), background vocals (tracks 8, 11, 12), claps (track 8)
- Dalton Allison – bass guitar (track 12), background vocals (tracks 11, 12)
- Jake Hirshland – synthesizer (track 11), background vocals (tracks 11, 12)
- Nyango Star – drums (tracks 3, 6–8, 10–12)

== Charts ==
Chart performance for The Crux
Chart (2025–2026)	Peak position
Australian Albums (ARIA)	19
Austrian Albums (Ö3 Austria)	38
Belgian Albums (Ultratop Flanders)	7
Belgian Albums (Ultratop Wallonia)	50
Canadian Albums (Billboard)	96
Dutch Albums (Album Top 100)	23
German Albums (Offizielle Top 100)	71
Irish Albums (IRMA)	83
Irish Independent Albums (IRMA)	6
Lithuanian Albums (AGATA)	89
New Zealand Albums (RMNZ)	27
Polish Albums (ZPAV)	19
Portuguese Albums (AFP)	112
Scottish Albums (Official Charts)	11
Spanish Albums (Promusicae)	73
UK Albums (Official Charts)	54
UK Independent Albums (Official Charts)	8
US Billboard 200	50
US Independent Albums (Billboard)	11
US Top Rock & Alternative Albums (Billboard)	10

== The Crux Deluxe ==
The Crux Deluxe

Studio album by Djo
- Released: September 12, 2025
- Studio: Electric Lady (New York City)
- Length: 44:13
- Label: Djo Music (via AWAL)
- Producers: Joe Keery; Adam Thein

Djo chronology
The Crux (2025)	The Crux Deluxe (2025)

Singles from The Crux Deluxe
- 1. "Carry the Name" Released: September 8, 2025; 2. "It's Over" Released: September 9, 2025; 3. "Awake" Released: September 10, 2025

The Crux Deluxe is a companion album to The Crux, released independently under AWAL on September 12, 2025, without prior announcement. It contains 12 new songs written, recorded, and produced by Keery and Thein at Electric Lady Studios while they worked on The Crux, and completed months after the album's release. The collection was preceded by three singles from the album's tracklist ("Carry the Name", "It's Over", and "Awake"), with each song being released daily between September 8 and 10.

The Crux Deluxe contains songs left out of the original album, and serves as an "alternate perspective" of the album's titular Crux hotel. On social media, Keery stated that it is "not so much a double album but an expansion of the world of [the initial album] that stands on its own as a unique body of work". Several tracks, including "It's Over" and "Who You Are", see Keery melancholically accepting the end of a relationship.

The songs incorporates several genres, including psychedelic rock, synth-pop, electropop, folk, and blues. Stereogum's Chris DeVille compared the first track, "T. Rex Is Loud", to the glam rock music of the English musician Marc Bolan, who is mentioned by name in the song's chorus. It is followed by the acoustic pop song "Love Can't Break the Spell" and the synth-rock "Mr. Mountebank", the last of which predominantly incorporates the use of Auto-Tune.

=== Track listing ===
The Crux Deluxe track listing
No.	Title	Length
1.	"T. Rex Is Loud"	3:11
2.	"Love Can't Break the Spell"	4:50
3.	"Mr. Mountebank"	5:11
4.	"Carry the Name"	2:27
5.	"It's Over"	3:26
6.	"Purgatory Silverstar"	4:08
7.	"Who You Are"	3:49
8.	"Grime of the World"	3:35
9.	"Try Me"	2:47
10.	"They Don't Know What's Right"	2:55
11.	"Thich Nhat Hanh"	3:34
12.	"Awake"	4:20
Total length:		44:13

=== Charts ===
Chart performance for The Crux Deluxe
Chart (2026)	Peak position
French Albums (SNEP)	100
French Rock & Metal Albums (SNEP)	4
Irish Independent Albums (IRMA)	12
Scottish Albums (Official Charts)	3
Spanish Albums (Promusicae)	50
UK Albums (Official Charts)	66
UK Independent Albums (Official Charts)	5
US Top Album Sales (Billboard)	13
