= Forward Motion Godyssey =

2020 studio album by Post Animal

Studio album by Post Animal
- Released: February 14, 2020
- Recorded: March 2019
- Genre: Progressive rock, psychedelic rock
- Length: 54:03
- Label: Polyvinyl Record Co.
- Producer: Post Animal; Adam Thein

Post Animal chronology
| When I Think of You in a Castle (2018) | Forward Motion Godyssey (2020) | Worried About You (2020) |

Singles from Forward Motion Godyssey
- 1. "Safe or Not - Extended Mix" Released: October 30, 2019; 2. "Schedule" Released: November 20, 2019; 3. "Fitness" Released: January 7, 2020; 4. "How Do You Feel" Released: February 6, 2020

Forward Motion Godyssey is the second full-length album released by Chicago-based rock band Post Animal, on February 14, 2020. It was the first album the band released after founding member Joe Keery amicably parted ways from the band in 2017 due to acting commitments, and thus is known for its differing sound from previous releases, mainly from their debut album, When I Think Of You In A Castle (2018). Overall, the album was met with moderately positive reception, with many reviews noting the album's experimental turns and wider musical variation from song to song.

The album was preceded by four singles from October 2019 to February 2020: "Safe or Not - Extended Mix", "Schedule", "Fitness", and "How Do You Feel". Like other Post Animal works, the album was written and created collaboratively by all five active members of the band, and all members shared vocal contributions on their respective compositions.

== Background ==
Post Animal was formed in Chicago in 2014, with four members (Dalton Allison, Matt Williams, Jake Hirshland, and Joe Keery) collaboratively writing and producing the band's debut EP Post Animal Perform The Most Curious Water Activities (2015). From there, the band added members Wesley Toledo and Javier 'Javi' Reyes in their following EP The Garden Series (2016) and finally produced their debut full-length album When I Think Of You In A Castle (2018) with all six members collaborating on the project.

However, after When I Think of You in a Castle (2018) was written and recorded, Joe Keery's role in Netflix's popular TV series Stranger Things was bumped up from supporting to main. In 2017, Keery officially left the band, due to both schedule conflicts and the desire for the band to "make a name for themselves" without necessarily being tied to the show". Keery began making his own solo music after his departure, releasing his first album (Twenty Twenty) under the name Djo in 2019, while keeping in touch with the band and even having Williams play guitar on his album's tenth track "Total Control".

The album was written from February to March 2019 and recorded in eight days in March 2019 in a family friend's cabin in Big Sky, Montana. Throughout their discography, all members of Post Animal write the band's music collaboratively.

== Composition ==
Like in previous albums, Forward Motion Godyssey was written collaboratively by all active members, and all members sing to some extent on the album, often on the songs they contributed most for. Because of this, the vocals within the album change from song to song, such as Williams's leads on "In A Paradise" and Reyes's lead on "How Do You Feel".

The album is noted for its wide range in genre influences. Songs "Post Animal" and "In a Paradise" are described as heavier prog rock and "Safe or Not" is often compared to disco. Many reviews note influences from Electric Light Orchestra in "Schedule" and "How Do You Feel".

Broadly, the album uses a lot of synth and distinct guitar across the track listing, leaning more into heavier rock compared to When I Think of You in a Castle (2019).

== Reception ==
Professional ratings
Aggregate scores
| Source | Rating |
|---|---|
| Metacritic | 74/100 |
Review scores
| Source | Rating |
| Sputnik Music | 4.3/5 stars |
| Consequence | B |
| Exclaim | 7/10 stars |
| Paste | 6.9/10 stars |

Forward Motion Godyssey received generally favorably reviews upon release, with may sources noting the album's variety and evolution of sound.

Sputnik Music's review rated the album positively at 4.3/5, describing the album as "a wonderful psychedelic rock outing with a myriad of influences, solid songwriting and a stellar production work" that "shows a band far more expressive and confident in their potential" compared to the previous album. The review praises the progression of experimentation in the band's sound as well as the dynamic and wide range from song to song. Towards the end, the review notes the album's potential for divisiveness among fans due to the wide genre variation in the album compared to previous works.

Consequence magazine stated that "the album showcases the band’s growth, not only as bandmates and songwriters, but in their subject matter. This lyrical growth often takes place on the album in the form of asking questions — about themselves, about existence, and what it means to live in a world that sometimes seems to be working against you." And while they generally enjoyed the variation in the album's sound from song to song, they said sometimes it would "seem like Forward Motion Godyssey can’t decide what it wants to be".

Exclaim magazine gave a generally positive review, also noting the improvement in songwriting. The review praised songs such as "Post Animal" and "In A Paradise" for their heavier rock sound, but describes the songs "How Do You Feel" and "Private Shield" as more awkward or unmastered versions of artists they were inspired by.

Paste magazine rated the album more negatively at 6.9/10, noting mostly a lack of cohesive sound within the album's experimentation, which they describe as a repeat instead of an evolution of the band's sound. The article describes the album as more "isolated and calculated" than the previous When I Think Of You In A Castle, leading to "the unpredictable charm and confidence that made their debut so special" being "not as effective or present throughout their sophomore release". The review praises heavier songs "Post Animal", "In A Paradise", and "The Whole" as highlights for both the lyrics and instrumentals, but laments the album's more pop-leaning songs and overall record inconsistency.

== Track listing ==
All tracks were written collaboratively by all members who were active at the time of the album's creation, which includes Dalton Allison, Matt Williams, Jake Hirshland, Wesley Toledo, and Javier Reyes.

Forward Motion Godyssey track listing
| No. | Title | Length |
|---|---|---|
| 1. | "Your Life Away" | 5:56 |
| 2. | "Post Animal" | 4:03 |
| 3. | "Schedule" | 4:14 |
| 4. | "Fitness" | 4:57 |
| 5. | "In a Paradise" | 4:21 |
| 6. | "The Whole" | 2:04 |
| 7. | "How Do You Feel" | 5:43 |
| 8. | "Safe or Not" | 4:11 |
| 9. | "Private Shield" | 4:08 |
| 10. | "Damaged Goods" | 4:06 |
| 11. | "Sifting" | 3:49 |
| 12. | "Safe or Not - Extended Mix" | 6:25 |
| Total length: | | 53:57 |
