= Parche =

Parche may refer to:

- Parche (fish), species of butterflyfish
- Parche, Nepal, town in the Gandaki Zone
- USS Parche, two submarines in the US Navy

== See also ==
- Chloe Parché (born 2003), Australian singer-songwriter and musician
