= Charlie Heaton =

English actor (born 1994)

- Heaton in 2026
- Born: Charlie Ross Heaton; 6 February 1994 (age 32); Leeds, England
- Occupations: Actor; musician
- Years active: 2010–present
- Partner: Natalia Dyer (2016–present)
- Children: 1
- Awards: Screen Actors Guild Award for Outstanding Performance by an Ensemble in a Drama Series (2017)

Charlie Ross Heaton (born 6 February 1994) is an English actor and musician. He is best known for his role as Jonathan Byers in the science fiction series Stranger Things (2016–2025). He has also starred in films such as As You Are (2016), Marrowbone (2017), The New Mutants (2020), No Future (2021), and The Souvenir Part II (2021). Prior to his acting career, he was the drummer in a number of rock bands.

== Early life ==
Charlie Ross Heaton was born in Leeds on 6 February 1994, and was raised by his mother on a council estate in Bridlington. His older sister, Levi, is an actress and a member of Self Esteem's live backing band.

== Career ==
In 2010, at the age of 16, Heaton moved to London. He played the drums in a number of bands before joining the noise rock band Comanechi. During his tenure as their drummer, the band supported The Gossip, released an album in 2013, and toured for 18 months. Heaton then joined psychedelic rock band Half Loon.

With no formal acting training, Heaton first considered an acting career while working as an extra and taking on other commercial work to supplement his income as a musician. He also worked as a bartender during this time. In 2015, he had guest roles on a string of British television dramas: he first appeared in the ITV crime drama series DCI Banks and Vera, then guest-starred in BBC One's medical drama series Casualty. That same year, he was cast in his breakthrough role as Jonathan Byers in the Netflix science fiction series Stranger Things (2016–2025). In his first feature film role, he appeared in the thriller film Shut In (2016), which was filmed just prior to Heaton being cast in Stranger Things but was not released until after the show premiered. He also filmed the coming-of-age film As You Are, which premiered at the Sundance Film Festival in January 2016.

In 2017, Heaton had a main role in the psychological horror film Marrowbone. In August 2018, the BBC announced that he would be playing Joseph Merrick, commonly known as the Elephant Man, in a new two-part drama. The casting drew criticism from a disability charity group, who said that not using a disabled actor was a missed opportunity, though the series was ultimately cancelled for other reasons. Heaton co-starred as Samuel "Sam" Guthrie / Cannonball in the superhero film The New Mutants (2020), which was poorly received critically and at the box office. He starred in the independent film No Future (2021) and had a supporting role in the film The Souvenir Part II (2021). In 2024, punk rock band Luxury Apartments released their self-titled album, featuring Heaton drumming on the song "Room Next Door". In his first role post-Stranger Things, he starred in the drama film Billy Knight (2025).

In April 2026, it was announced that Heaton will take over the role of Charles Shelby, the son of Tommy Shelby (Cillian Murphy) in the unnamed Peaky Blinders sequel series that takes place 10 years after Peaky Blinders: The Immortal Man.

Heaton starred in Fontaines D.C.'s music video for "Japan" from their album Dopamine Chamber. The video premiered on October 16, 2026.

== Personal life ==
Heaton has a son (born 2014) with Japanese musician Akiko Matsuura, who was then his bandmate, when Heaton was 20 and Matsuura was 34. He later said of being a young parent, "You have to grow up very fast. You have to also learn ethical priorities, too, and you've got to look after somebody. That's a big thing. You want to give them good experiences and a lot of love and the hard part obviously is distance. But that's part of the sacrifice."

Since 2016, Heaton has been in a relationship with American actress Natalia Dyer, whom he had met when she played his character's girlfriend Nancy Wheeler in Stranger Things. He said of their relationship, "It's been a gift to work with my best friend. To be able to have a shared experience with your partner about the anxiety when you don't get a job—I know what that feels like, she knows what that feels like. You can be there to talk about it, or when you have a shit day at work, or come away from a scene and you didn't think it worked. To be able to both understand each other on that level is great."

Heaton became an avid supporter of Arsenal FC after moving to London at the age of 16.

In October 2017, Heaton flew from England to Los Angeles International Airport, where he was detained for possession of small amounts of cocaine. He was not charged with a crime and was instead sent back to England. He was later allowed to return to the U.S. to film the third season of Stranger Things.

Punk rock band Skinny Lister wrote their 2016 song "Charlie" about Heaton, who is a long-time friend of several band members. He is a close friend of his Stranger Things co-star Joe Keery, who as a musician uses the stage name Djo. Keery's 2025 album The Crux features the songs "Charlie's Garden" and "Delete Ya". Heaton provided additional instrumentation and a pair of voicemails by a crew member on "Charlie's Garden", which was written about their friendship and former status as neighbors whilst filming Stranger Things in Atlanta, while "Delete Ya" directly namedrops Heaton in the lines "Blue and gold, Friday night / Team up with Charlie, take these kids for a ride".

== Filmography ==
Key
| † | Denotes productions that have not yet been released |

=== Film ===
| Year | Title | Role | Extra Information |
|---|---|---|---|
| 2014 | Life Needs Courage | Charlie | Short film |
| 2015 | The Schoolboy | Michael Stevens | Short film |
| 2015 | Rise of the Footsoldier Part II | Dealer | |
| 2015 | Urban & the Shed Crew | Frank | |
| 2016 | As You Are | Mark | |
| 2016 | Shut In | Stephen Portman | |
| 2017 | The Performers: Act III | Bowie Character | Short film |
| 2017 | Marrowbone | Billy Marrowbone | |
| 2020 | The New Mutants | Samuel Guthrie / Cannonball | |
| 2021 | No Future | Will | |
| 2021 | The Souvenir Part II | Jim Dagger | |
| 2025 | Billy Knight † | Alex Hubbs | Released at film festival. Not yet in theatres. |
| TBA | Twice Over † | George | |

=== Television ===
| Year | Title | Role | Notes |
|---|---|---|---|
| 2015 | DCI Banks | Gary McCready | 2 episodes |
| 2015 | Vera | Riley | Episode: "Changing Tides" |
| 2015 | Casualty | Luke Dickinson / Jason Waycott | 2 episodes |
| 2016–2025 | Stranger Things | Jonathan Byers | Main role; 34 episodes |
| 2020 | Soulmates | Kurt | Episode: "Break On Through" |
| 2026 | Industry | Jim Dycker | 3 episodes |
| 2026 | Below | Wade Penney | Main role |
| TBA | Peaky Blinders † | Charles Shelby | Main role |

== Awards and nominations ==
| Year | Award | Category | Work | Result | Ref. |
|---|---|---|---|---|---|
| 2017 | Screen Actors Guild Awards | Outstanding Performance by an Ensemble in a Drama Series | Stranger Things | Won | |
| 2018 | Screen Actors Guild Awards | Outstanding Performance by an Ensemble in a Drama Series | Stranger Things | Nominated | |
| 2018 | Teen Choice Awards | Choice Scene Stealer | Stranger Things | Nominated | |
| 2020 | Screen Actors Guild Awards | Outstanding Performance by an Ensemble in a Drama Series | Stranger Things | Nominated | |
