= Harmony House =

Harmony House may refer to:

- Harmony House, 2016 album by Dave Dobbyn
- Harmony House, 2021 album by Sloan Struble under his stage name Dayglow
- Harmony House (music retailer), defunct music retailer
