= Harmony House (Dayglow album) =

Studio album by Dayglow
- Released: May 21, 2021
- Genre: Bedroom pop; indie pop; alternative pop; pop rock
- Length: 34:24
- Label: Very Nice Records; AWAL
- Producer: Sloan Struble

Dayglow chronology
Fuzzybrain (2018)	Harmony House (2021)	People in Motion (2022)

Singles from Harmony House
- 1. "Close to You" Released: January 11, 2021; 2. "Something" Released: February 22, 2021; 3. "Woah Man" Released: April 1, 2021; 4. "Balcony" Released: May 6, 2021; 5. "Medicine" Released: May 21, 2021

Harmony House is the second studio album by American singer-songwriter and producer Sloan Struble, under his stage name Dayglow. It was released on May 21, 2021, through Very Nice Records in partnership with AWAL. (Note: Very Nice Records is Struble's self-founded record label.) Harmony House was announced in February 2021, following the re-release of Struble's debut album Fuzzybrain (2019) and the success of his single "Can I Call You Tonight?".

Harmony House received generally favorable reviews from music critics. The album was supported by five singles, that "Close to You", "Something", "Woah Man", "Balcony", and "Medicine". After the release of the album, Struble headlined the Harmony House Tour.

== Background ==
After the release of the extended version of Dayglow's debut album, Fuzzybrain, Struble planned to embark on a sold-out headlining show in early 2020. Due to the COVID-19 pandemic, the tour was canceled and Struble isolated in his Austin residence. In an interview with NME, Struble explained that the idea of Harmony House came from writing "[the] soundtrack for a sitcom that doesn't exist." Struble compared the feeling after the virality of the song, "Can I Call You Tonight?", as if he were living in the universe of the 1998 film The Truman Show.

== Composition and lyrics ==
Harmony House has been described as an overall bedroom pop, indie pop, pop rock, and alternative pop record.

The first song, "Something" is a funk song, with lyrics explaining the harsh separation between the digital world and reality. The song contains a melody of notes that reoccurs throughout other songs on the album. Describing "Balcony", Struble explained in a social media post how he set out to create a song that sounded similarly to the music of the Cure, Broncho, and the Mario Kart video-game soundtrack. Driven by synths, a keyboard, and tenor saxophone, "December" describes seasonal depression, and a longing for life to get exciting again. One of the lyrics from the song comes from a poem which was a favorite of Struble's great-grandmother. The album's lead single "Close to You" describes "the tension between two people at a party that never said hello." "Crying on the Dancefloor" is song describing a party, while "Into Blue" is an introspective disco ballad describing the "after-party" of the previous song.

"Moving Out" is an electric piano song inspired by the James Taylor album "That's Why I'm Here". Stating that it is "one of [his] favorite songs [he's] written so far," Struble describes Woah Man as "[letting] go of holding on." Originally not intended to make it onto the album's tracklist, 'Strangers" is the vulnerable, somber "emotional climax" of the record, with Struble explaining "I want people to know that I go through hard stuff too, and life is like that sometimes." In an album overview with Pilerats Sloan explains "Like Ivy" as the second part to "Strangers" and the "immediate closure following [the previous track]". Struble continues, "The first track on the record, Something, is like the essence of quickly rising to fame and feeling so overwhelmed by it. During the outro I say "It's taking time, it's taking time” over and over— like I can't even get the words out of what I'm trying to say. Like Ivy on the other hand though, is like the completion of the sentence."

== Release and promotion ==
On January 11, 2021, Struble released the lead single from Harmony House, "Close to You". The song reached a peak of 22 on Billboard's Alternative Airplay chart and 20 on the Adult Alternative Airplay chart. Harmony House was officially announced on February 22 of the same year, alongside the release of the second single from the album, "Something". Before the album's release in May 2021, two more singles were released, "Woah Man" (released April 1) and "Balcony" (released May 6). On May 21, 2021, Harmony House was released alongside the music video for "Medicine", the fifth single from the album.

"Close to You" was used in the eighth episode of the Netflix series Heartstopper and subsequently appeared on the Heartstopper: Official Mixtape released by Spotify.

== Critical reception ==
Professional ratings
Aggregate scores
Source	Rating
Album of the Year	80/100
Review scores
Source	Rating
Dork	4/5

Harmony House received generally favorable reviews from music critics. At Album of the Year, which assigns a normalized rating out of 100 to reviews from professional publications, the album received an average score of 80, based on one review.

Writing for Dork, Finlay Holden states "[Harmony House] push[es Struble's] production beyond the restraints of his charming yet confined origins," and that "[if]‘Fuzzybrain was the pinnacle of 2010s bedroom pop, ‘Harmony House’ is a masterful throwback to the cheese of 80s pop-rock that Dayglow somehow makes as culturally relevant and appealing as it's ever been."

== Track listing ==
All tracks written and produced by Sloan Struble.

Harmony House track listing
No.	Title	Length
1.	"Something"	1:54
2.	"Medicine"	3:49
3.	"Balcony"	2:31
4.	"December"	3:11
5.	"Close to You"	3:14
6.	"Crying on the Dancefloor"	4:23
7.	"Into Blue"	3:39
8.	"Moving Out"	3:00
9.	"Woah Man"	3:28
10.	"Strangers"	2:52
11.	"Like Ivy"	2:33
Total length:		34:24
