= Close to You (Dayglow song) =

Single by Dayglow

from the album Harmony House
- Released: 11 January 2021
- Genre: Indie pop
- Length: 3:14
- Label: Acrophase Records
- Songwriter: Sloan Struble
- Producer: Dayglow

Dayglow singles chronology
"False Direction" (2018)	"Close to You" (2021)	"Something" (2021)

Music video
- "Close to You" on YouTube

"Close to You" is a song by the by American singer-songwriter and producer Sloan Struble, under his stage name Dayglow. The song was released on 11 January 2021 as the lead single from their second studio album, Harmony House (2021).

== Background ==
During an interview, Struble said, "The song itself is about the tension between two people at a party that never said hello. It’s about the excitement and perfect fantasy you play in your head prior to seeing that person, the mediocre and nervous reality of the actual moment you see them, and the let down that always comes afterwards it not being what had always and only been living in your head. I envision the song being played inside someone's brain – kind of like the movie Inside Out – after they are leaving a party, thinking about what they wish would have happened. But in reality, they are actually just singing to and about themselves". Struble additionally noted that the song was originally planned to be performed as a duet, but the idea was scrapped.

== Composition ==
When describing what he wanted to do for the song, Struble said, "There is just a certain danceable yet melancholy feeling about 80’s pop duets that I wanted to channel into". The song draws inspiration from Whitney Houston, Patti Labelle and Michael McDonald.

== Critical reception ==
Robin Murray of Clash Magazine described the song as, "An infusion of classic pop palettes – think 80s synth glamour meets breezy West Coast fare – with an innate burst of melancholy. A deft fusion of light and shade that extemporises on this mixture to deft impact. The single finds Dayglow tapping into his 80s pop roots while delivering a succinct lyrical narrative". In a positive review of the track, Jason Brillon of Atwood Magazine said, "Struble continues to impress with “Close to You”, showcasing Dayglow's ongoing growth and talent. Make no mistake: “Close to You” may transport us back to the ’80s, but it only further catapults Struble into the spotlight", and additionally compared the song to Never Gonna Give You Up by Rick Astley.

"Close to You" became Dayglow's second commercially successful single and was eventually certified gold by the RIAA.

== Charts ==
Peak chart positions for "Close to You"
Chart	Peak position
US Adult Alternative Airplay (Billboard)	22
US Hot Rock & Alternative Songs (Billboard)	43
US Alternative Airplay (Billboard)	20
