= Delete Ya =

2025 single by Djo

Single by Djo

from the album The Crux
- Released: February 27, 2025
- Studio: Electric Lady (New York City)
- Genre: Soft rock
- Length: 3:23
- Label: Djo Music (via AWAL)
- Songwriters: Joe Keery; Adam Thein
- Producers: Joe Keery; Adam Thein

Djo singles chronology
"Basic Being Basic" (2025)	"Delete Ya" (2025)	"Potion" (2025)

Lyric video
- "Delete Ya" on YouTube

"Delete Ya" is a song by the American actor and musician Joe Keery, under his alias Djo. It was released independently under AWAL on February 27, 2025, as the second single from his third studio album, The Crux (2025). Keery wrote the song alongside Adam Thein. It is a 1980s-inspired soft rock track with nostalgic lyrics about recalling someone with high standards and being frustrated by the end of a relationship.

== Background and release ==
On January 24, 2025, Joe Keery announced his third studio album as Djo, titled The Crux, and revealed its cover artwork and track listing, which includes "Delete Ya" as the fifth song. The lead single, "Basic Being Basic", was released on the same date. The second single from the album, "Delete Ya", was released to digital platforms on February 27, 2025, alongside a lyric video that premiered on Keery's YouTube channel. The animated video was made by Jack Zhang and Andrew Onorato.

== Composition ==
As part of The Crux, "Delete Ya" was written and produced by Keery and his frequent collaborator Adam Thein at Electric Lady Studios in New York City. The former provided the lead vocals and played electric guitar, while the latter played synthesizers and piano. Additionally, Wesley Toledo played drums. The track has a duration of three minutes and twenty-three seconds.

"Delete Ya" is a soft rock song influenced by 1980s music. In the nostalgia-evoking lyrics, the musician expresses about trying to forget someone with high standards while not being able to do so. He describes his frustration with the end of their relationship and also recalls an old apartment where he no longer lives. Jaeden Pinder from Consequence wrote that Keery sings in a "lackadaisical, Julian Casablancas-like" style. The song namechecks Keery's fellow Stranger Things actor Charlie Heaton, referencing the times they would go on drives with their younger co-stars. Keery also wrote the song "Charlie's Garden" on The Crux about their friendship.

== Reception ==
Rolling Stone included the track on a list of the best music from its release week. Megan Lapierre of Exclaim! believed that if The Crux "sounds anywhere near as good as [the song] everyone should be interested". Derrick Rossignol from Uproxx added "Delete Ya" to a list of the best music of its release week and said that it "is another example of Keery's superlative ability to bring retro inspirations to present day".

== Charts ==
Chart performance for "Delete Ya"
Chart (2025–2026)	Peak position
Canada Modern Rock (Billboard Canada)	27
Ireland (IRMA)	78
New Zealand Hot Singles (RMNZ)	25
UK Singles (Official Charts)	74
UK Indie (Official Charts)	20
US Hot Rock & Alternative Songs (Billboard)	26
