= Post Animal =

American psychedelic rock band

Background information
- Origin: Chicago, Illinois, U.S.
- Genres: Psychedelic rock; progressive pop
- Years active: 2014–present
- Labels: Polyvinyl; AWAL; Shuga; Pod / Inertia (Australia)
- Members: Dalton Allison; Matt Williams; Jake Hirshland; Joe Keery; Wesley Toledo; Javier Reyes
- Website: postanimal.us

Post Animal is an American psychedelic rock band from Chicago, Illinois formed in 2014. The group consists of six members: Dalton Allison (bass), Matt Williams (guitar), Jake Hirshland (guitar/keyboard), Joe Keery (guitar), Wesley Toledo (drums), and Javi Reyes (guitar). All members share songwriting contributions and frequently sing on the songs they contributed most for.

== Career ==
=== 2014–2017: Early career ===
The band was first formed by Dalton Allison and Matthew Williams after moving to Chicago and finding other members Jake Hirshland and Joe Keery. Their debut EP, Post Animal Perform the Most Curious Water Activities, released in 2014, featuring Allison on bass, Matthews on guitar, Hirshland on keyboards, Keery on drums, and all members singing in some capacity. Wesley Toledo joined soon after as the band's new drummer, halfway through the release of the singles collection and the band's second EP The Garden Series in 2016, when Keery wanted to switch from playing drums to guitar. Javier Reyes joined last, originally filling in for Keery when he was away for acting commitments but became an official member by 2017. During this time, Post Animal played many local shows in Chicago and toured with White Reaper, Twin Peaks, Ron Gallo, J. Roddy Walston and the Business, and Wavves.

Post Animal signed to Polyvinyl Records in 2017 and played Shaky Knees and Bonnaroo music festivals in 2018. The band's debut full-length, When I Think of You in a Castle, was released on April 20, 2018, and was preceded by one single, "Special Moment", which was released on May 12, 2017 with an accompanying music video.

By 2017, Keery was no longer a touring member of the band. In 2018, after When I Think of You in a Castle, he officially parted ways due to acting commitments.

=== 2018–2023 ===
Following Keery's departure, the band continued making music, releasing four singles ("Safe or Not - Extended Mix", "Schedule", "Fitness", and "How Do You Feel") and then their second full-length album Forward Motion Godyssey on February 14, 2020 to generally positive reception. The album was notable for how the sound differed from the previous album, with positive reviews praising the album's variation and describing it as a bold evolution, while negative reviews described it as not cohesive or lacking the first album's charm.

Post Animal supported Cage the Elephant in February 2020 on their United Kingdom tour. The band were the supporting act on dates in Leeds, Glasgow, Manchester, Birmingham, and London.

In October 2020, the band released a three-track EP named Worried About You, with music videos on youtube accompanying each song.

The band's third album, Love Gibberish, was released on May 13, 2022, and preceded by three singles: "Puppy Dog", "No More Sports", and "Cancer Moon".

In June 2023, Post Animal supported the band Temples on their North American tour for thirteen shows. That same month, they released one single, "Aging Forest", on June 6, 2023. Despite originally being intended to introduce an unspecified future album, "Aging Forest" is currently the only Post Animal single to not be part of a larger official project.

=== 2025–present: Iron and Keery's return ===
In 2025, Keery rejoined the band for their next record, Iron, which was released on July 25, 2025, with a deluxe edition of songs cut from the original album (Iron: Expansion Pack) that was released on November 21, 2025. The band opened for Keery's solo music project (Djo) on the Back on You World Tour, including the shows in Europe, before returning to America to continue opening for Djo in the Another Bite tour. For both tours, Toledo and Reyes played in both Post Animal's and Djo's sets, playing their usual drums and guitar respectively.

Following the Another Bite Tour, the band (minus Keery) is continuing to tour separate from Djo through the end of December 2025, headlining all remaining shows. They were accompanied by The Slaps for the first leg and will be accompanied by Chanpan on the second leg. Many of the shows sold out and a few had venues changed to increase capacity.

== Musical style ==
The Chicago Tribune has described the band's sound as "if Tame Impala listened to a lot of Black Sabbath and were signed to Elephant 6." MusicDaily.com described their sound 2020-2023 sound as "Musical cousins of bands like King Gizzard & The Lizard Wizard, La Luz and Dumbo Gets Mad..."

When Keery rejoined the band for Iron, the band mentioned it brought back the writing dynamics and sound from their time making When I Think of You in a Castle. As a result, the album and marketing around it brings special attention to the group's friendship.

== Members ==
As of 2025, all founding members are active in the band and the band has no former or inactive members.

=== Dalton Allison ===
Allison is a founding member of the band, starting the band with high school friend Matt Williams after the pair moved to Chicago for college in 2014.

For the majority of their discography, Allison is credited as the band's bass player, and although all members share vocal roles, Allison is the member most frequently credited with lead vocals, particularly on the band's early releases. He is also responsible for the mixing and engineering on most of the band's discography, as well as the mastering for the band's earliest works.

Outside of Post Animal, Allison does freelance audio engineering, mixing and mastering. He is credited as an additional performer for Djo's third album, The Crux (2025), contributing vocals and bass.

==== Solo Music: Daallher and Dawn Clarke ====
Allison has released music on Bandcamp as early as 2014 under the name 'Daallher', but these works have not been carried over to his present musical career.

In 2024, Allison took on the pseudonym "Dawn Clarke" for his current solo music, releasing one pair of singles, Growing Pains B/W Holding On (2024), and one EP, Pit Stop (2025). Both works have been released for digital download and streaming on most major streaming sites.

=== Matt Williams ===
Williams is another founding member of the band, starting the band with high school friend Dalton Allison after the pair moved to Chicago for college in 2014.

Williams is credited for guitar on most of the band's discography and contributes vocals on songs such as "Heart Made Of Metal" (from When I Think Of You In A Castle) and "In A Paradise" (from Forward Motion Godyssey).

Outside of Post Animal, Williams has credits in some of Djo's music, such as playing guitar in "Total Control" from Twenty Twenty (2019).

=== Jake Hirshland ===
Hirshland is the third founding member of the band, joining Allison and Williams shortly after meeting them for the first time in college in 2014.

Hirshland most often plays a combination of keyboards or synthesizers with guitar, often both during the same song, including during live performances. He contributes lead vocals on songs such as "Maybe You Have To" (from IRON) and frequently contributes backing vocals.

Outside of Post Animal, Hirshland also works frequently with Keery as a creative director for Djo, with credits on Twenty Twenty (2019), Decide (2022), The Crux (2025), and The Crux Deluxe (2025).

In 2019, Hirshland began releasing music with Reyes under the name "Jake and Javier". They released the single "Marcus" in 2019 and a pair of singles "Correlation" and "Just Me" (compiled under the name & Helini) in 2020.

=== Joe Keery ===
Keery was the fourth founding member of the band, initially filling the role of drummer after meeting Williams at their shared food service job in 2015.

Keery had always dabbled in guitar and vocals, and was the band's primary drummer for their first EP, Post Animal Perform The Most Curious Water Activities (2014), and the first few songs of their second EP, The Garden Series (2016). Wesley Toledo is credited for drums for the rest of the EP, and joined as the band's new official drummer, letting Keery play mainly guitar for the rest of their discography. Keery also has shared lead vocals roles on songs such as "Ralphie" and "Gelatin Mode" (both from When I Think Of You In A Castle).

Although officially still being part of the band, Keery often does not travel with or perform in the band's full sets while touring, though he has joined the band for parts of their sets when Djo and Post Animal tour together.

==== Solo Music: Djo ====
Keery first released solo music in 2019 after he officially left the band for acting commitments. Despite the separation, Keery still worked with several members of Post Animal, with Hirshland as a creative director for all his solo albums, Williams playing guitar in "Total Control" from Twenty Twenty, and all the members contributing some instruments and backing vocals for The Crux and The Crux Deluxe.

In 2025, before the release of The Crux, Keery rejoined Post Animal and brought the band as openers for both the Back on You World Tour and the immediately following Another Bite tour. Toledo and Reyes also play in Djo's touring band, Toledo playing drums and Reyes frequently playing both guitar and keyboards.

=== Wesley Toledo ===
Toledo was the fifth member to join in 2015 after Keery wanted to switch from drums to guitar.

Toledo plays the drums in each of the band's releases after Post Animal Perform The Most Curious Water Activities (2014) and often contributes background vocals. He's also known particularly for his writing contributions to the song "Maybe You Have To" (from IRON), which features voicemails from Toledo's abuela before her death.

Outside of Post Animal, Toledo is also one of the main touring drummers for Djo and performs for many of the songs in The Crux and The Crux Deluxe.

=== Javier Reyes ===
Javier Reyes was the sixth member to join the band, originally to fill in for Keery when he couldn't tour with the band, but the group became good friends and Reyes became an official member by 2018.

Reyes is credited for guitar on most songs and has "special thanks" mentions in the credits of The Garden Series (2016) before he officially joined the band. Reyes has also mentioned contributing keyboards and bass, as well as regularly contributing lead vocals, singing on songs such as "Caving In" (from Worried About You) and "Puppy Dog" (from Love Gibberish).

Outside of Post Animal, Reyes also plays guitar and keyboards in Djo's touring band.

In 2019, Reyes began releasing music with Hirshland under the name "Jake and Javier". They released the single "Marcus" in 2019 and a pair of singles "Correlation" and "Just Me" (compiled under the name & Helini) in 2020.

==== Solo Music: Javier Reyes ====
In 2021, Reyes started releasing solo music under his full first and last name, Javier Reyes, starting with the album Big Amigo. In 2025, Reyes released a second full album titled How's Javi. Both albums were released for digital download, streaming, and had LP physical printings.

== Discography ==
=== Albums ===
List of all released albums
Year	Title	Release date	Label and format	Credited members
2017	When I Think of You in a Castle	April 20, 2018	Polyvinyl Record Company; digital download, streaming, LP, CD	Dalton Allison, Jake Hirshland, Joe Keery, Javier Reyes, Wesley Toledo, Matt Williams
2020	Forward Motion Godyssey	February 14, 2020	Polyvinyl Record Company; Digital download, streaming, LP, CD	Dalton Allison, Jake Hirshland, Javier Reyes, Wesley Toledo, Matt Williams
2022	Love Gibberish	May 13, 2022	Shuga Records; Digital download, streaming, LP	Dalton Allison, Jake Hirshland, Javier Reyes, Wesley Toledo, Matt Williams
2025	Iron	July 23, 2025	Polyvinyl Record Company; Digital download, streaming, LP	Dalton Allison, Jake Hirshland, Joe Keery, Javier Reyes, Wesley Toledo, Matt Williams

=== EPs ===
List of all released EPs
Year	Title	Release date	Label and format	Credited members
2014	Post Animal Perform the Most Curious Water Activities	October 27, 2014	Not on label; Digital download, streaming, LP	Dalton Allison, Jake Hirshland, Joe Keery, Matt Williams
2016	The Garden Series	July 22, 2016	Not on label; Digital download, streaming, CDr	Dalton Allison, Jake Hirshland, Joe Keery, Wesley Toledo, Matt Williams (with special thanks to Javier Reyes)
2020	Worried About You	October 16, 2020	Not kn label; Digital download, streaming	Dalton Allison, Jake Hirshland, Javier Reyes, Wesley Toledo, Matt Williams
2025	Iron: Expansion Pack	November 21, 2025	Polyvinyl Record Company; Digital download, streaming, LP	Dalton Allison, Jake Hirshland, Joe Keery, Javier Reyes, Wesley Toledo, Matt Williams

=== Singles ===
List of all released singles and their respective albums/EPs
Year	Title	Release date	Album	Credited members
2014	"Goggles"	September 11, 2014	Post Animal Perform the Most Curious Water Activities	Dalton Allison, Jake Hirshland, Joe Keery, Matt Williams
2016	When I Get Home/Big Boy Smack	March 2, 2016	The Garden Series	Dalton Allison, Jake Hirshland, Joe Keery, Wesley Toledo, Matt Williams (with special thanks to Javier Reyes)
2016	Lonely Jones/You Were Not There	May 10, 2016	The Garden Series	Dalton Allison, Jake Hirshland, Joe Keery, Wesley Toledo, Matt Williams (with special thanks to Javier Reyes)
2016	Violet/Caught in the Trap	June 2, 2016	The Garden Series	Dalton Allison, Jake Hirshland, Joe Keery, Wesley Toledo, Matt Williams (with special thanks to Javier Reyes)
2017	"Special Moment"	May 12, 2017	When I Think of You in a Castle	Dalton Allison, Jake Hirshland, Joe Keery, Javier Reyes, Wesley Toledo, Matt Williams
2019	"Safe or Not- Extended Mix"	October 30, 2019	Forward Motion Godyssey	Dalton Allison, Jake Hirshland, Javier Reyes, Wesley Toledo, Matt Williams
2019	"Schedule"	November 20, 2019	Forward Motion Godyssey	Dalton Allison, Jake Hirshland, Javier Reyes, Wesley Toledo, Matt Williams
2020	"Fitness"	January 7, 2020	Forward Motion Godyssey	Dalton Allison, Jake Hirshland, Javier Reyes, Wesley Toledo, Matt Williams
2020	"How Do You Feel"	February 6, 2020	Forward Motion Godyssey	Dalton Allison, Jake Hirshland, Javier Reyes, Wesley Toledo, Matt Williams
2022	"Puppy Dog"	March 16, 2022	Love Gibberish	Dalton Allison, Jake Hirshland, Javier Reyes, Wesley Toledo, Matt Williams
2022	"No More Sports"	April 6, 2022	Love Gibberish	Dalton Allison, Jake Hirshland, Javier Reyes, Wesley Toledo, Matt Williams
2022	"Cancer Moon"	April 27, 2022	Love Gibberish	Dalton Allison, Jake Hirshland, Javier Reyes, Wesley Toledo, Matt Williams
2023	"Aging Forest"	June 6, 2023	-	Dalton Allison, Jake Hirshland, Javier Reyes, Wesley Toledo, Matt Williams
2025	"Last Goodbye"	April 17, 2025	Iron	Dalton Allison, Jake Hirshland, Joe Keery, Javier Reyes, Wesley Toledo, Matt Williams
2025	"Pie in the Sky"	May 15, 2025	Iron	Dalton Allison, Jake Hirshland, Joe Keery, Javier Reyes, Wesley Toledo, Matt Williams
2025	"What's a Good Life"	June 26, 2025	Iron	Dalton Allison, Jake Hirshland, Joe Keery, Javier Reyes, Wesley Toledo, Matt Williams
2025	"Leave Overjoyed"	October 22, 2025	Iron: Expansion Pack	Dalton Allison, Jake Hirshland, Joe Keery, Javier Reyes, Wesley Toledo, Matt Williams
