= No Future (film) =

- Directed by: Mark Smoot; Andrew Irvine
- Written by: Mark Smoot
- Story by: Mark Smoot; Andrew Irvine
- Produced by: Jeff Walker; Lisa Normand; Kelly Williams; Jonathan Duffy
- Starring: Catherine Keener; Charlie Heaton; Rosa Salazar; Jefferson White; Jackie Earle Haley
- Cinematography: Jomo Fray
- Edited by: Brad Besser
- Music by: Jon Natchez
- Production companies: Ten Acre Films; Terraform
- Release date: June 13, 2021 (Tribeca)
- Running time: 89 minutes
- Country: United States
- Language: English

No Future is a 2021 American drama film directed by Mark Smoot and Andrew Irvine and starring Catherine Keener, Charlie Heaton, Rosa Salazar, Jefferson White and Jackie Earle Haley.

== Plot ==
Will is a recovering drug addict whose friend Chris died of an overdose after visiting him. Will, while struggling to keep his life together, begins to have an affair with Chris' mom, Claire.

== Cast ==
- Catherine Keener as Claire
- Charlie Heaton as Will
- Rosa Salazar as Becca
- Jefferson White as Chris
- Jackie Earle Haley as Philip
- Austin Amelio as Preston
- Heather Kafka as Linda
- Jason Douglas as Doug
- Kia Nicole Boyer as Erin
- Mollie Milligan as Deborah
- Jasmine Shanise as Woman in Nursery
- Marissa Woolf

== Release ==
The film premiered at the Tribeca Film Festival on June 13, 2021.

== Reception ==
The film has a 91 percent rating on Rotten Tomatoes based on 23 reviews.

Sheri Linden of The Hollywood Reporter gave the film a positive review and wrote, "...through the unpredictability of its two leads, Keener especially, and in the knotty connection between their characters, the movie gets under the skin and goes beyond the bromide-laden playbook."

Peter Sobczynski of RogerEbert.com awarded the film three stars and wrote, "...a fairly smart and realistic depiction of two people consumed by grief, guilt, and loss and the misguided ways by which they attempt to come to terms with those feelings."

Andrew Stover of Film Threat rated the film an 8 out of 10 and wrote, "Smoot and Irvine appreciate an exceedingly solemn tone and a measured pace. No Future is unassuming, truthful, and absorbing by virtue of the deeply sensitive performances..."
