= Fuzzybrain =

2018 studio album by Dayglow

Studio album by Dayglow
- Released: September 28, 2018
- Genre: Bedroom pop
- Length: 30:10
- Label: Self-released
- Producer: Sloan Struble

Dayglow chronology
Fuzzybrain (2018)	Harmony House (2021)

Singles from Fuzzybrain
- 1. "Mindless Creatures" Released: September 29, 2017; 2. "Run The World!!!" Released: September 30, 2017; 3. "Can I Call You Tonight?" Released: January 30, 2018; 4. "False Direction" Released: May 30, 2018

Fuzzybrain is the first studio album by American singer-songwriter and producer Sloan Struble, under his stage name Dayglow. It was originally independently released on September 28, 2018. An expanded version of Fuzzybrain would later be released under Acrophase Records.

Several songs from this album became popular after its initial release, with "Can I Call You Tonight?" and album track "Hot Rod" both being certified gold by the RIAA.

== Background ==
The album cover features a clay model of Struble's head, which he molded himself.

Struble said that, "In high school, I was just making music. I had a studio. I mean, it was just in my bedroom. But I basically worked on [songs for Fuzzybrain] all day long", with all of Fuzzybrain being recorded between his senior year of high school and his first year at the University of Texas.

== Track listing ==
All tracks written and produced by Sloan Struble.

Fuzzybrain track listing
No.	Title	Length
1.	"False Direction"	4:37
2.	"Can I Call You Tonight?"	4:38
3.	"Hot Rod"	3:24
4.	"Run The World!!!"	2:56
5.	"Fair Game"	4:22
6.	"Dear Friend,"	2:22
7.	"Fuzzybrain"	3:39
8.	"Junior Varsity"	4:12
Total length:		30:10

== Album re-release ==
Fuzzybrain

Studio album by Dayglow
- Released: November 13, 2019
- Genre: Bedroom pop
- Length: 37:11
- Label: Acrophase Records
- Producer: Sloan Struble

Dayglow chronology
Fuzzybrain (2019)	Harmony House (2021)

On November 13, 2019, Struble released an expanded version of Fuzzybrain, featuring the new songs "Nicknames" and "Listerine", under Acrophase Records.

=== Background ===
About the re-release, Struble said, "Both those songs were written around the same time as the rest of the album and very much exist in the Fuzzybrain universe. Each is deeply intertwined into the conceptual universe and purpose of Fuzzybrain, and it just wouldn’t feel right releasing them in a separate body of work".

=== Critical reception ===
Ellicit Magazine's review of the re-release said, "the Austin-based artist reveals his rare gift for illuminating emotional pain in a way that not only resonates, but ultimately makes that pain feel lighter. With its bright textures and effervescent melodies, glistening guitar tones and radiant vocals, the album instantly invites a dreamy euphoria, even as it gets incredibly candid about isolation and anxiety and loss".

=== Track listing ===
All tracks written and produced by Sloan Struble.

Fuzzybrain track listing
No.	Title	Length
1.	"False Direction"	4:37
2.	"Can I Call You Tonight?"	4:38
3.	"Hot Rod"	3:24
4.	"Run The World!!!"	2:56
5.	"Fair Game"	4:22
6.	"Dear Friend,"	2:22
7.	"Fuzzybrain"	3:39
8.	"Junior Varsity"	4:12
9.	"Nicknames"	3:23
10.	"Listerine"	3:38
Total length:		37:11
