= Hot Rod (song) =

Song by Dayglow

from the album Fuzzybrain
- Released: September 28, 2018
- Genre: Indie pop
- Length: 3:24
- Label: Acrophase Records
- Songwriter: Sloan Struble
- Producer: Dayglow

Music video
- "Hot Rod" on YouTube

"Hot Rod" is a song by the by American singer-songwriter and producer Sloan Struble, under his stage name Dayglow. The song was released on September 28, 2018, as the third track from their first studio album, Fuzzybrain (2018).

The song became a sleeper hit and was eventually certified Gold by the RIAA. It is now considered one of their most popular songs.

== Background ==
The lyrics of the song consist of Struble saying how he feels that his relationships always end in heartbreak, with him feeling that he's being used as a prop and not as a priority.

== Critical reception ==
Alycia Pritchard of The Honey Pop magazine, in her positive review of the song, said, "This indie pop anthem is the perfect song to sprinkle some light on a dark day, too. It has such a whimsical rhythm, and the beat makes us want to get up and groove". Sam Roche of Guitar World says, "Hot Rod epitomizes the modern-day renaissance man's optimistic and cheerful writing style". A review from PSU specifically highlighted the instrumentals, saying, "I’d like to give a shout out to the instrumental after he says “Uh”. It goes off to some nice upbeat instrumental that gives this song that summertime vibe. It's a nice high pitched guitar solo with light drums. *Chef's Kiss*".

== Music video ==
Dayglow begins the video on a tower, where he takes out his binoculars to scout for cute girls to pick up. While Dayglow rides his bike away from the tower in a red fringe jacket, he crashes into a bike-riding girl wearing a yellow fringe scarf. The two fall in love, and spend the rest of the day making fuse bead dolls and playing patty-cake together. Everything is perfect between the two until the "nice guy" switch on his guitar is flipped off, at which point he ditches his girl and leaves her brokenhearted. Later, Dayglow goes back to his tower, only to find the girls are all gone. Instead, they are inside the brain of a giant primary-colored fringe monster that has come to take revenge on Dayglow. Right before the two face off, the video ends.

Nicholas Wong of Texas Monthly said, "With its Wes Anderson-like charm, the music video for “Hot Rod” further proved that the self-made artist is something special. Dayglow is unmistakably whimsical, relatable, and a breath of fresh air". The Honey Pop magazine described the video as, "Such a delightful, colorful watch that is sure to give you that mood boost you’re looking for!".

== Certifications ==
Certifications
Region	Certification	Certified units/sales
New Zealand (RMNZ)	Gold	15,000^{‡}
United States (RIAA)	Gold	500,000^{‡}
^{‡} Sales+streaming figures based on certification alone.
