= Sloan Struble =

American singer

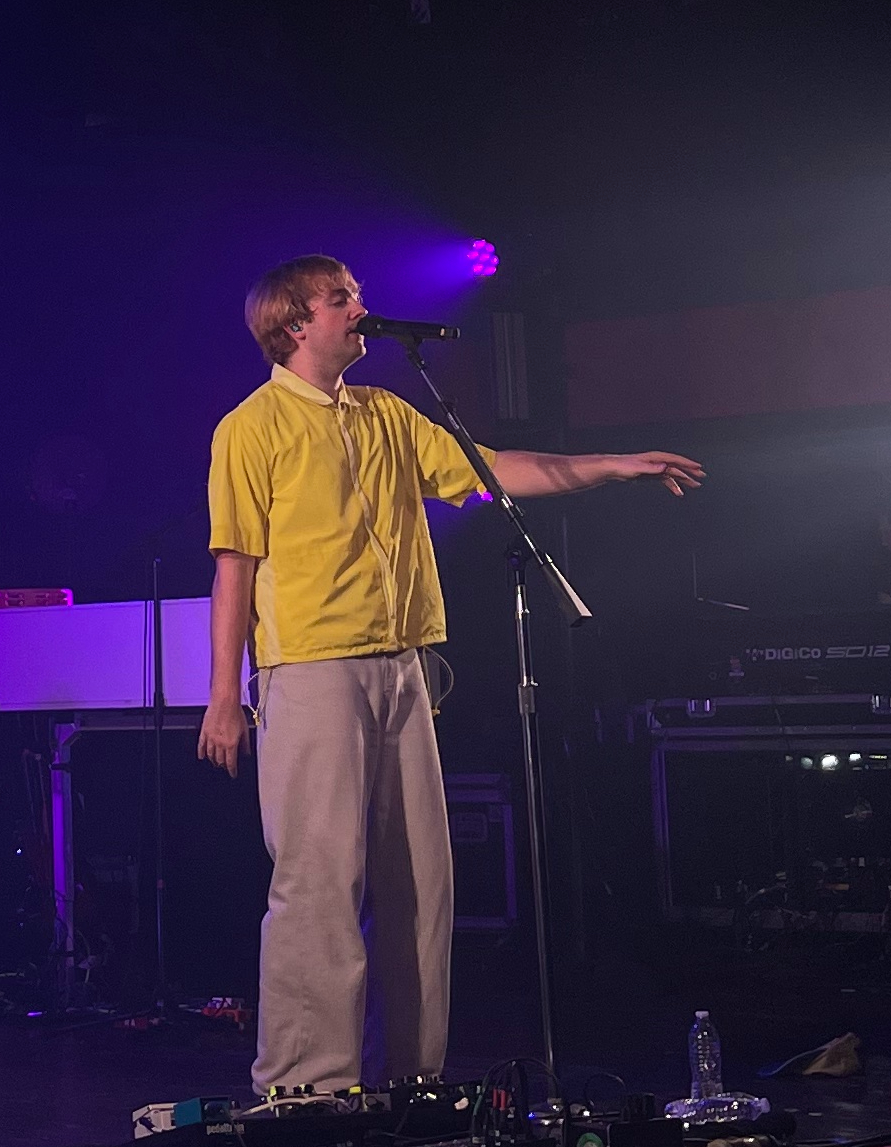
- Struble in 2022
- Born: Sloan Christian Struble; August 10, 1999 (age 27); Aledo, Texas, U.S.
- Occupations: Singer; songwriter; musician; producer
- Years active: 2016–present
- Spouse: Reagan Liddell (m. 2021)
- Musical career
- Genres: Indie pop; dream pop; jangle pop; synth-pop; indie rock; alternative rock
- Instruments: Vocals; piano; keyboards; synthesizers; guitar; bass; drums
- Labels: AWAL; Very Nice; Acrophase; Mercury; Republic; Polydor
- Website: dayglowband.com

Sloan Christian Struble (born August 10, 1999) is an American rock music singer, songwriter, and producer from Aledo, Texas. He is best known as the founder and frontman of the rock band and indie pop project Dayglow. Dayglow released its debut album, Fuzzybrain, on September 28, 2018. Dayglow performing members include bassist Peyton Harrington, drummer Brady Knippa, keyboardist Norrie Swofford, guitarist Colin Crawford, and in the past have included guitarist Nate Davis, drummer Reece Myers, keyboardist Nico Fennell, bassist Eric Loop, and saxophonist Marshall Lowry.

== Personal life ==
Struble was born in Aledo, Texas. At 11 years old, he started to work with GarageBand to teach himself how to play guitar, bass, keyboard, synthesizer and drums, as well as produce and mix to create music. He graduated from high school in 2018 from All Saints' Episcopal School of Fort Worth. He started attending the University of Texas at Austin in 2018, where he studied advertising.

== Career ==
=== Kindred (2016–2017) ===
On October 1, 2016, under the name Kindred, Struble released his first album, also titled Kindred. Throughout 2017, Kindred released three singles. The first, a re-written version of "That's Just Life" by Francis and the Lights, was released on January 14, 2017. This was followed by "This Love" on March 6, 2017. On March 30, 2017, Struble released his last song under the name Kindred, "Spent my Life". "Spent my Life" is the only song released under the name Kindred that is available on streaming services such as Spotify, YouTube and Apple Music, while the rest of Kindred's songs are only available on SoundCloud.

=== Dayglow (2017–present) ===
==== 2017–2020: Fuzzybrain ====
In late 2017, Struble founded the solo indie pop project Dayglow. Despite being the sole member, Struble has stated that he does not view himself as a solo artist, and describes Dayglow as a band, similar to Tame Impala or Mutemath. On September 29, 2017, Dayglow released its first single, "Mindless Creatures". The next day, "Run The World!!!" was released. On January 30, 2018, Dayglow released "Can I Call You Tonight?". On May 30, 2018, Dayglow released its fourth single, "False Direction".

On September 27, 2018, Dayglow released its first full-length album, Fuzzybrain, featuring the previously released singles "Run The World!!!", "Can I Call You Tonight?", and "False Direction". Following the album release, Dayglow was invited to perform at Austin City Limits Music Festival at BMI Stage on October 12, 2019.

==== 2021–2022: Harmony House ====
On January 11, 2021, Dayglow released its first song since 2019, "Close to You", along with an accompanying music video. On January 13, 2021, the single "Can I Call You Tonight?" was certified Gold.

On February 22, 2021, Struble announced Dayglow's second full-length album, Harmony House. On the same day, Dayglow released the album's second single, "Something". According to Struble, "Something" reflects on the way social media is used, saying, "Stuff is never going to fulfill us, yet we are always wanting more and more and it’s just such an unfortunate waste of time".

On April 1, 2021, the third single off of Harmony House, "Woah Man" was released. "Balcony" followed on May 6.

On May 21, 2021 Harmony House was released through AWAL and Struble's own label Very Nice Records, alongside a music video for the second track on the album "Medicine".

==== 2022: People in Motion ====
On June 21, 2022, Struble announced Dayglow's third studio album, People in Motion, alongside the lead single "Then It All Goes Away". On August 18, 2022, the second single off of People in Motion, "Deep End" was released. The following single, "Second Nature", was released on September 23, 2022.

People in Motion was released on October 7, 2022.

==== 2023-2025: Self-Titled & Tour ====
On May 3, 2024, Dayglow released the single "Every Little Thing I Say I Do," its first new material in almost two years. On June 21, 2024, it released a second single, "Cocoon," which coincided with the announcement of a self-titled fourth record, Dayglow. Dayglow was released on September 13, 2024, with Struble stating that, "It felt like I had unlocked a trapped part of my brain creatively. It was like, ‘Oh yeah, this is what my music is supposed to sound like, this is Dayglow!’”

The release of Dayglow coincided with the start of a national tour that started in Mexico City on September 13, and ended in Austin, Texas on November 23, 2024.

In 2024, he performed the song, We Are What We Think We Are, from the children's television in Yo Gabba Gabbaland.

==== 2025-present: Superbloom ====
On June 26, 2025, Dayglow released the deluxe album, Superbloom. Superbloom was a deluxe album released to go alongside his self-titled album. The tweaked album included six new songs, #11, Self-Esteem, #12, Atlantis, #13, Ricochet, #14, Little Alien Spaceman, #15, All Star #1 and #16, Superbloom.

== Style ==
Struble chose the name Dayglow from the song "Day Glo" by Brazos. Dayglow's music is a blend of alternative and indie pop. Washington Square News wrote that Struble's style "draws inspiration from the upbeat, groovy style of other artists such as the Doobie Brothers and Michael McDonald." Other inspirations for his musical style include Michael Jackson and Tame Impala.

== Discography ==
=== Kindred ===
==== Studio albums ====
Title	Details
Kindred	Released: October 1, 2016; Label: Self-release; Format: Digital download

==== Singles ====
Title	Year	Album details
"That's Just Life" – Francis and the Lights (Kindred Re-Write)	2017	Non-album singles
"This Love"	2017	Non-album singles
"Spent My Life"	2017	Non-album singles

=== Dayglow ===
==== Studio albums ====
Title	Details
Fuzzybrain	Released: September 28, 2018; Label: Self-release; 2019: Acrophase Records; Format: Digital download, vinyl, CD, cassette; Track listing: 1. "False Direction"; 2. "Can I Call You Tonight?"; 3. "Hot Rod"; 4. "Run the World!!!"; 5. "Fair Game"; 6. "Dear Friend,"; 7. "Fuzzybrain"; 8. "Junior Varsity"; 9. "Nicknames"; 10. "Listerine"
Harmony House	Released: May 21, 2021; Label: Very Nice Records; Format: Digital download, vinyl, CD, cassette; Track listing: 1. "Something"; 2. "Medicine"; 3. "Balcony"; 4. "December"; 5. "Close to You"; 6. "Crying on the Dancefloor"; 7. "Into Blue"; 8. "Moving Out"; 9. "Woah Man"; 10. "Strangers"; 11. "Like Ivy"
People in Motion	Released: October 7, 2022; Label: Very Nice Records; Format: Digital download, vinyl, CD, cassette; Track listing: 1. "Second Nature"; 2. "Radio"; 3. "Then It All Goes Away"; 4. "Deep End"; 5. "Stops Making Sense"; 6. "How Do You Know?"; 7. "Someone Else"; 8. "Like She Does"; 9. "Turn Around"; 10. "Talking To Light"
Dayglow	Released: September 13, 2024; Label: Very Nice Records; Format: Digital download, vinyl, CD, cassette; Track listing: 1. "Mindless Creatures"; 2. "Every Little Thing I Say I Do"; 3. "Cocoon"; 4. "Old Friend, New Face"; 5. "What People Really Do"; 6. "Nothing Ever Does!!!"; 7. "This Feeling"; 8. "Weatherman"; 9. "Silver Lining"; 10. "Broken Bone"
Superbloom	Released: June 27, 2025; Track listing: 1. "Superbloom"; 2. "Little Alien Spaceman"; 3. "Self-Esteem"; 4. "Atlantis"; 5. "Ricochet"; 6. "All-Star #1"

==== Singles ====
Title	Year	Peak chart positions			Certifications	Album
Title	Year	US Alt.	US Rock	US AAA	Certifications	Album
"Mindless Creatures"	2017	—	—	—		Non-album single
"Run The World!!!"	2017	—	—	—		Fuzzybrain
"Can I Call You Tonight?"	2018	3	17	5	RIAA: 2x Platinum; ARIA: 2x Platinum; BPI: Silver; MC: Platinum	Fuzzybrain
"False Direction"	2018	—	—	—		Fuzzybrain
"Close to You"	2021	22	43	20	RIAA: Gold	Harmony House
"Something"	2021	—	—	—		Harmony House
"Woah Man"	2021	—	—	—		Harmony House
"Balcony"	2021	—	—	—		Harmony House
"Then It All Goes Away"	2022	23	—	20		People in Motion
"Deep End"	2022	—	—	—		People in Motion
"Second Nature"	2022	—	—	—		People in Motion
"Every Little Thing I Say I Do"	2024	21	—	—		Dayglow
"Cocoon"	2024	—	—	—		Dayglow
"—" denotes a recording that did not chart or was not released in that territory.

==== Other certified songs ====
Title	Year	Certifications	Album
"Hot Rod"	2019	RIAA: Gold	Fuzzybrain
