= The Lazy Eyes =

Australian rock band

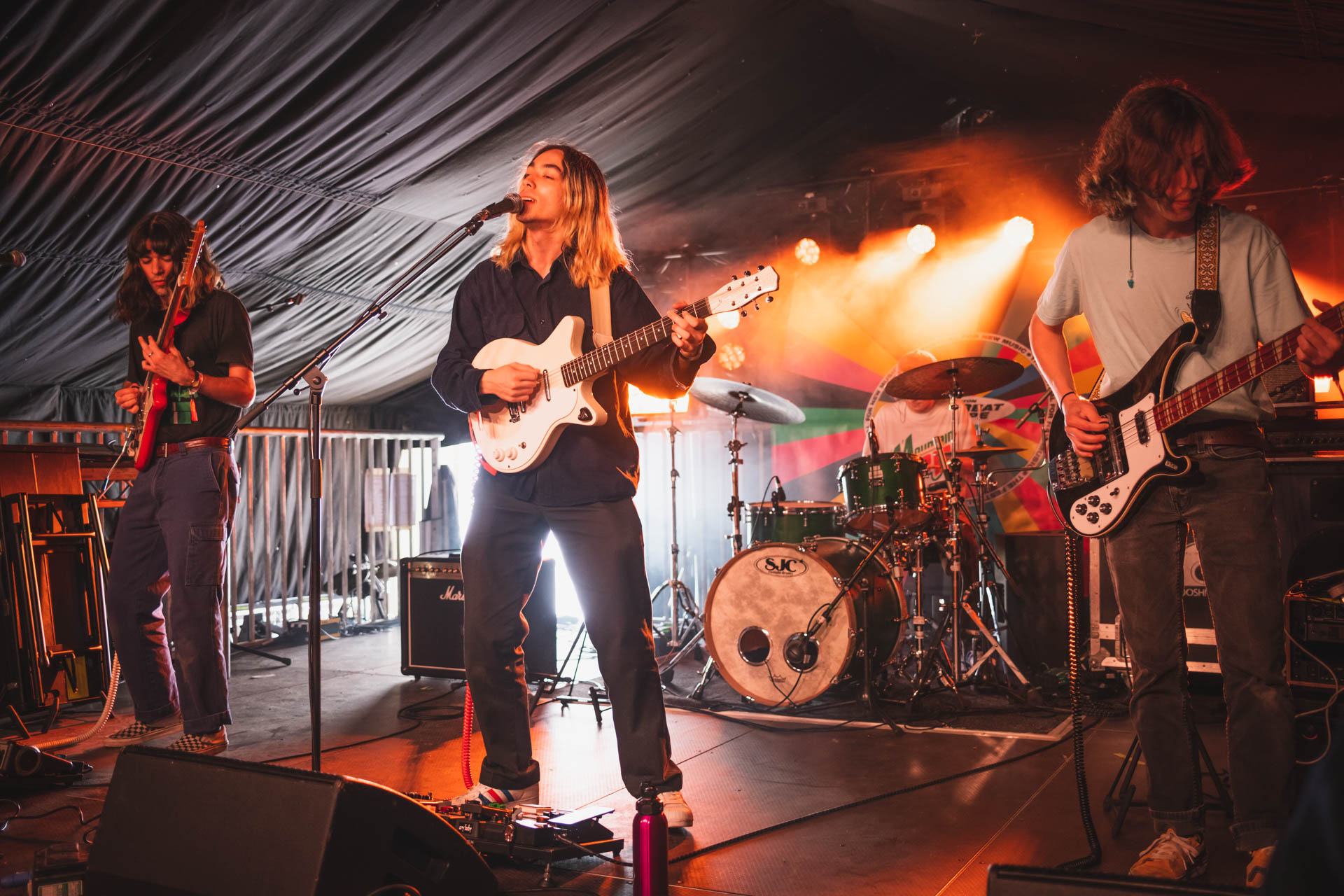
- The Lazy Eyes in 2022

Background information
- Origin: Sydney, New South Wales, Australia
- Genres: Psychedelic rock, indie rock, krautrock
- Years active: 2019–present
- Members: Harvey Geraghty; Noah Martin; Itay Shachar; Leon Karagic
- Past members: Blake Wise
- Website: thelazyeyes.com

The Lazy Eyes are an Australian psychedelic rock band made up of Harvey "Karate" Geraghty (vocals, guitar, keyboard), Leon Karagic (bass guitar), Noah Martin (drums) and Itay "Sasha" Shachar (vocals, guitar). Their debut album, SongBook, was released in 2022. The Lazy Eyes have headlined shows in Australia, the United States and United Kingdom.

== History ==
The Lazy Eyes were formed in Sydney as an indie rock band by Harvey "Karate" Geraghty (vocals, guitar, keyboard), Blake Wise (bass guitar), Noah Martin (drums) and Itay "Sasha" Shachar (vocals, guitar). They had all attended Newtown High School of the Performing Arts. The group's name references Beach House's 2015 album track "Common Girl"'s lyrics, "She's the one with the lazy eye." Leon Karagic replaced Wise on bass guitar.

One of their early performances was at the BigSound festival in 2019. Their debut single "Cheesy Love Song" was released in January 2020. It was followed by a three-track extended play, EP1, in June. Their second three-track EP2was released in July 2021.

The Lazy Eyes released their debut studio album SongBook in 2022 via The Orchard, receiving a 9/10 review from Clash Magazine, 3/5 from NME while receiving praise from Spin Magazine.

Their track "Fuzz Jam" was added to full rotation on national youth radio Triple J, becoming the No. 1 most played track for November 2021 and was performed on the "Like a Version" segment in September 2022. They also covered Bee Gees' "More Than a Woman" during the same session.

The group sold out headline shows in Australia, United States and United Kingdom. They performed at St. Jerome's Laneway Festival (Australia), The Great Escape Festival (UK), Splendour in the Grass (Australia) and Hipnosis Festival (Mexico), as well as supporting the Strokes. The Lazy Eyes started their own festival, Lazyfest in 2021.

On 26 March 2026, the band announced their second album Cheesy Love Songs and released its first single, "The One Who Got Away". The album was released on 21 August 2026.

== Discography ==
=== Albums ===
List of albums, with selected chart positions
Title	Album details	Peak chart positions
Title	Album details	AUS
SongBook	Released: April 2022; Format: LP, digital; Label: The Orchard (64TLD008CD)	—
Cheesy Love Songs	Released: 21 August 2026; Format: LP, digital; Label: AWAL (TLE02)	91

=== Extended plays ===
- EP1 (19 June 2020) – Self-published
- EP2 (16 July 2021) – Self-published
