= USS Parche =

Two U.S. Navy submarines have borne the name "Parche" /ˌpɑːrˈtʃeɪ/, for a butterfly fish, Chaetodon capistratus.

- USS Parche (SS-384), a Balao-class diesel electric submarine which served during World War II (1943–1946).
- USS Parche (SSN-683), a Sturgeon-class nuclear powered attack submarine, modified for espionage duty (1973–2004).
