= Decide (album) =

2022 studio album by Djo

Studio album by Djo
- Released: September 16, 2022
- Studio: The Sound Factory (Los Angeles)
- Genres: Synth-pop; synthwave; alt-pop
- Length: 36:03
- Label: Djo Music (via AWAL)
- Producers: Joe Keery; Adam Thein

Djo chronology
Twenty Twenty (2019)	Decide (2022)	The Crux (2025)

Singles from Decide
- 1. "Change" Released: June 22, 2022; 2. "Gloom" Released: July 25, 2022; 3. "Figure You Out" Released: August 26, 2022; 4. "Half Life" Released: September 9, 2022; 5. "End of Beginning" Released: March 1, 2024

Decide is the second studio album by the American actor and musician Joe Keery, under his stage name Djo. It was self-released under AWAL on September 16, 2022, and served as the follow-up to his previous album, Twenty Twenty (2019). Keery and Adam Thein entirely wrote and produced the album during the COVID-19 lockdowns, and recorded it at The Sound Factory in Los Angeles in late 2021. Marking a departure from his previous psychedelic rock sound, Decide is a synth-pop, synthwave, and alt-pop album. The lyrical content focuses on Keery's reflections on several themes and his anxiety about changes and identity.

Upon its release, Decide was met with a positive reception from music critics, mainly for its lyricism and production. It was preceded by four singles: "Change", "Gloom", "Figure You Out", and "Half Life". In 2024, the track "End of Beginning" saw virality on social media and entered the US Billboard Hot 100, leading it to be released as the fifth single. In parallel, Decide appeared on the national charts of Canada, Germany, Hungary, the Netherlands, and the United States.

== Background and development ==
The American actor and musician Joe Keery started releasing music under the alias Djo in 2019, when he left the band Post Animal after three projects between 2015 and 2018. His debut studio album, Twenty Twenty, was released on September 13, 2019, and supported by three singles and concerts in the United States. NME received it positively. In an interview on The Tonight Show Starring Jimmy Fallon, Keery stated that the decision of performing under the name Djo was made after he had the idea to not be "directly connected" to him. He also played wearing a wig, inspired by the entertainer Andy Kaufman. In an interview with NME, he said that he adopted the Djo stage name to separate his music career from Steve Harrington, the character he portrays in the Netflix series Stranger Things, but he then liked "the camaraderie that it creates".

Keery and the producer Adam Thein started developing Decide in 2019, in parallel to a series of concerts in promotion of Twenty Twenty. They continued working on the album during the COVID-19 lockdowns through screen-shared Ableton sessions. The two were collaborators in Post Animal and also collaborated on Twenty Twenty. In 2020, he told Rolling Stone that he was "recording for fun, downloading music". During the development of Decide, Keery had moments of "self-doubt", attached to his character in Stranger Things. Watching The Beatles: Get Back (2021) helped him; it showcases the Beatles creating their final studio album Let It Be (1970). Keery listened to the personal lyrics of the rapper and songwriter Kendrick Lamar, and took them as an indication to not "edit" himself on Decide, like he did with Twenty Twenty. In late 2021, they recorded the album at The Sound Factory in Los Angeles.

== Composition ==
=== Overview ===
Decide is a synth-pop, synthwave, and alt-pop album, with perceived elements of 1970s new wave, funk, and 1980s pop music. It marked a departure from the psychedelic rock of Twenty Twenty, predominantly containing synthesizers and several vocal affections. It has a wider range of music genres in comparison to his previous effort. Lyrically, Decide centers on Keery's reflections on relationships, technology, and self-growth, as well as his anxiety about changes and identity. It served as a document from his previous years, and he described it as a "sort of aural history of [his] late 20s". The musician David Byrne was one of the biggest influences for the album, while Keery also cited the duos Daft Punk and Justice, the singers Charli XCX and Julian Casablancas, and the band the Strokes. Charli XCX's 2022 album Crash was mentioned by Keery for sharing similarities in their humorous moments. Inspired by how his girlfriend of the time enjoyed music, Keery focused more on the song's lyrics instead of the melody, in contrast to his debut album. Some songs on the album deviate from the traditional writing form, as he wanted to do something "surprising". The DIY critic Neive McCarthy opined that the album contains an energy based on synthesizers, with self-analytical but optimistic lyrics. It also includes Auto-Tuned vocals and chiptune.

=== Songs ===
The opening track "Runner" showcases personal songwriting, where he addresses his own dilemma, "People never change, but I have to try", in a falsetto. Josh Glicksman of Billboard said that it "would fit" on Currents (2015) by the music project Tame Impala. On the dark synth-pop song "Gloom", Keery's voice is accompanied by a kick drum and guitar. Influenced by the bands Devo and Talking Heads, it depicts him listing a series of excuses for leaving. The futuristic third track "Half Life" focuses on the struggles Keery had gone through online. He revealed that the first lyric is about him "trying to resist the urge to search [his] name". Sonically, it is built over a Blade Runner (1982)-like production, and has sophisti-pop elements, and a groovy chorus. It is followed by the R&B "Fool", which is reminiscent to the funk band Cameo, according to The Line of Best Fit's Christopher Hamilton-Peach. "On and On" describes the feeling of losing faith and monotony with the addiction to scrolling through the internet. It later contains "explosive" drums, similar to those of the arena rock subgenre, according to Quinn Moreland of Pitchfork.

The lyrics of "End of Beginning" are about reconnecting with a past version of himself in Chicago. He described it as "saying goodbye to a certain part of your life, and it being a sad thing, but also looking onward". It contains a sentiment of nostalgia and dissociation, and was compared by Glicksman to the bands INXS and Crowded House. Musically, it is a power ballad that includes a low guitar line and synthesizers. The lyrical content of "Climax" is a confrontation to the future: "It terrifies me there is no plan/The future breaking right on top of me". It was compared to the Strokes by Daniel Hartmann of Exclaim!. "Change" is a synth funk song predominantly containing synthesizers on a funk rock and psychedelic rock base. Keery named the bands T. Rex and Parliament-Funkadelic as inspiration for the track. It drew comparisons to the works of Tame Impala, with Stereogum's Chris Deville describing it as a "poppier" The Slow Rush (2020). According to NME's Tom Disalvo, it encompasses the psychedelia of Twenty Twenty and the pop-punk of his 2020 single "Keep Your Head Up". The only interlude on the album, titled "Is That All It Takes", precedes "Go for It", which contains synthesizers reminiscent to those from "Hell of a Life" by Kanye West, according to Glicksman. The track starts with a bass and a staccato melody and turns into a pop ballad, centering on a love that fades quickly. The twelfth track, "Figure You Out", describes a disconnect from reality through questions: "Is the memory really mine?/Is the story I told just fake?/How can you get to know yourself?". The album closes with "Slither", with lyrics showcasing hope.

== Release and promotion ==
On June 22, 2022, Keery announced the release of Decide and subsequently released its lead single, "Change". It marked his first release since the 2020 single "Keep Your Head Up". "Gloom", the second single from the album, was released on July 25, 2022. Keery shared a series of videos on his Instagram account with a hotline number, through which he revealed snippets of the songs. "Figure You Out" was released as the third single from Decide on August 26, 2022. The fourth single, "Half Life" premiered a week before the album, on September 9, 2022. Keery debuted songs from Decide at several festivals and concerts before its release; these included Lollapalooza and the Austin City Limits Music Festival.

Decide was released on September 16, 2022, through CD, vinyl LP, cassette, and digital formats. It was self-published under an exclusive license to AWAL. On November 17, 2023, D-Sides, a double single with two outtakes from the album, was released. In 2024, "End of Beginning" became Keery's first entry on the Billboard Hot 100 chart following its increased usage on the video-sharing app TikTok, debuting at number 51 on the chart. It was sent to Italian airplay on March 1, 2024, as the album's fifth single. It later reached number 11 in the US and the top five in the UK. Alongside the song's success, Decide began to appear on the national charts of various countries. It peaked at number 10 in the Netherlands, and within the top 40 in Hungary (32), Canada (35), and Germany (35). In the United States, the album reached number 56 on the Billboard 200, and appeared on the Independent Albums and Top Rock & Alternative Albums charts, at numbers 10 and 11, respectively. Additionally, it entered the UK Album Downloads Chart at the 93rd position.

== Critical reception ==
Professional ratings
Aggregate scores
Source	Rating
AnyDecentMusic?	7.7/10
Metacritic	77/100
Review scores
Source	Rating
Clash	8/10
DIY	4/5 stars
Dork	5/5 stars
Exclaim!	7/10
The Line of Best Fit	8/10
Pitchfork	6.8/10
Under the Radar	8/10 stars

On Metacritic, Decide received a weighted mean score of 77 out of 100 based on six critics' reviews, indicating "generally favorable" reception. The review aggregator site AnyDecentMusic? compiled 9 reviews and gave Decide an average of 7.7 out of 10, based on their assessment of the critical consensus.

The songwriting and themes of the album generally received praise; several critics described the lyricism as "honest". Lauren McDermott of Clash wrote that it has "an even wider range" than the sound, and that the combination of hooks, lyrics, and high-energy instrumental is unexpected. Dork's Finlay Holden lauded the album's cohesion and themes, and said that it has "too many individual highlights to list". However, Moreland was more critical, believing that the songwriting is not "quite up for the challenge" and lacks its own personality, in reference to the several influences.

The reviewers were positive about the production, with Holden admiring the "sonically bold and completely addictive" songs, and Hartmann mentioning the sonic and emotional twists. Hamilton-Peach agreed, describing it as "chameleonic" and also praising the artistic voice of Keery. Moreland opined that the highlights on the album are the longer songs, on which the production takes "unexpected directions". McCarthy described Decide as a "deeply thoughtful and yet infinitely danceable collection of songs".

Several critics compared positively Decide to Twenty Twenty. Writing for Under the Radar, Mariel Fechik believed that Keery's talent "expand[s] outward", and said that the album is more confident and decisive than his previous effort. Holden said that Keery explored further sonically on the album, and McDermott stated that it is a "much bolder" than his debut. The former finalized the review by writing that "the record is thrillingly artistic while maintaining an alluring accessibility that makes it hard to stop listening".

== Track listing ==
All tracks are written and produced by Joe Keery and Adam Thein, except where noted.

Decide track listing
No.	Title	Length
1.	"Runner"	4:18
2.	"Gloom" (writer: Joe Keery)	2:00
3.	"Half Life"	3:47
4.	"Fool" (writer: Keery)	1:54
5.	"On and On"	4:03
6.	"End of Beginning" (writer: Keery)	2:39
7.	"I Want Your Video"	2:08
8.	"Climax"	3:55
9.	"Change" (writer: Keery)	2:57
10.	"Is That All It Takes" (writer and producer: Keery)	0:20
11.	"Go for It"	3:01
12.	"Figure You Out"	3:04
13.	"Slither"	1:50
Total length:		36:03

== Personnel ==
The personnel is adapted from the album's liner notes.

- Joe Keery – production, mixing
- Adam Thein – production, mixing
- Ted Mathews – drums
- Heba Kadry – mastering
- Dana Trippe – photography, cover design
- Kelly Ford – cover design
- Nicole Blue – cover design
- Belhum – layout

== Charts ==
Chart performance for Decide
Chart (2024–2026)	Peak position
Belgian Albums (Ultratop Flanders)	180
Canadian Albums (Billboard)	20
Danish Albums (Hitlisten)	34
Dutch Albums (Album Top 100)	10
German Albums (Offizielle Top 100)	16
German Rock & Metal Albums (Offizielle Top 100)	8
Hungarian Albums (MAHASZ)	15
Japanese Albums (Oricon)	14
Japanese Combined Albums (Oricon)	25
Japanese Top Albums Sales (Billboard Japan)	12
Lithuanian Albums (AGATA)	55
Scottish Albums (Official Charts)	33
UK Albums Sales (OCC)	67
UK Independent Albums (Official Charts)	23
US Billboard 200	24
US Independent Albums (Billboard)	5
US Top Rock & Alternative Albums (Billboard)	5

== Certifications ==
Certifications for Decide
Region	Certification	Certified units/sales
New Zealand (RMNZ)	Platinum	15,000^{‡}
^{‡} Sales+streaming figures based on certification alone.
