= Can I Call You Tonight? =

Single by Dayglow

from the album Fuzzybrain
- Released: 26 January 2018
- Genre: Indie pop
- Length: 4:37
- Label: Acrophase Records
- Songwriter: Sloan Struble
- Producer: Dayglow

Dayglow singles chronology
"Run the World!!!" (2017)	"Can I Call You Tonight?" (2018)	"False Direction" (2018)

Music video
- "Can I Call You Tonight?" on YouTube

"Can I Call You Tonight?" is a song by the American singer-songwriter and producer Sloan Struble, under his stage name Dayglow. The song was released on 26 January 2018 as the third single from their first studio album, Fuzzybrain (2018). Dayglow would later perform the song on The Late Show with Stephen Colbert.

The song became a sleeper hit and only started charting in 2020, two years after its original release. In the span of a year, the song went from 10 million streams to 100 million which occurred after Emma Chamberlain featured the song in an Instagram reel.

== Critical reception ==
In a positive review of the song, Kid With a Vinyl said the track, "Doesn't sound like the work of a flustered student, but instead the work of a mature, seasoned professional, capturing the essence of what pure indie pop should be – echoed vocals, bright, textured synth, and a wonderfully bittersweet lyrical narrative somehow both wistful and hopeful all at once".

"Can I Call You Tonight?" became Dayglow's first commercially successful song and was eventually certified Gold by the RIAA, in part due to its popularity on TikTok, Spotify, and Instagram.

== Charts ==
Peak chart positions for "Can I Call You Tonight?"
Chart	Peak position
US Adult Alternative Airplay (Billboard)	5
US Hot Rock & Alternative Songs (Billboard)	17
US Alternative Airplay (Billboard)	3

== Certifications ==
Certifications
Region	Certification	Certified units/sales
Australia (ARIA)	2× Platinum	140,000^{‡}
Canada (Music Canada)	Platinum	80,000^{‡}
New Zealand (RMNZ)	Platinum	30,000^{‡}
United Kingdom (BPI)	Silver	200,000^{‡}
United States (RIAA)	2× Platinum	2,000,000^{‡}
^{‡} Sales+streaming figures based on certification alone.
