= End of Beginning =

2024 single by Djo

Single by Djo

from the album Decide
- Released: March 1, 2024 (radio airplay)
- Genre: Synth-pop; baroque rock; Indie pop
- Length: 2:39
- Label: Djo Music; AWAL
- Songwriter: Joe Keery
- Producers: Joe Keery; Adam Thein

Djo singles chronology
"Half Life" (2022)	"End of Beginning" (2024)	"Basic Being Basic" (2025)

Lyric video
- "End of Beginning" on YouTube

"End of Beginning" is a song by the American actor and musician Joe Keery, under his stage name Djo. It was first made available by AWAL on September 16, 2022, as the sixth track from his second studio album, Decide. The song began to gain popularity on TikTok in 2024; as a result, it was issued as a single on March 1, 2024.

The song received a second wave of popularity in January 2026 following the series finale of Stranger Things, in which Keery stars as the character Steve Harrington. It has topped the charts in Czech Republic, Greece, Indonesia, Italy, Latvia, Lithuania, Slovakia, Sweden, and the United Kingdom, and peaked within the top ten in over 25 other countries, including Australia, Belgium (Flanders), Canada, Germany, Ireland, New Zealand, and the United States.

== Background and composition ==
“End of Beginning” was premiered for the first time during a show in Birmingham, Alabama on April 28, 2022. Having been released as part of Keery's second studio album, Decide (2022), the song did not garner attention until 2024 when TikTok users picked up a lyric of the track to underline clips of their hometowns. As a result, it entered charts in various countries by late February 2024, including the Billboard Hot 100 and the UK Singles Chart.

"End of Beginning" is a synth-pop song, accompanied by guitar riffs and a "nostalgic electro sound", about the recurring feeling of returning to Chicago.

== Commercial performance ==
"End of Beginning" debuted on the US Billboard Hot 100 at number 51, with 8.4 million streams, on the chart dated March 2, 2024. The song reached its initial peak at number 11 in its fifth week on the chart dated March 30, 2024. Bolstered by the series finale of Stranger Things, the song re-entered the chart at number 16 on the week dated January 10, 2026, and reached its new peak at number six the following week.

In the United Kingdom, "End of Beginning" made its debut at number 100 on the UK Singles Chart on February 16, 2024 — for the week ending date February 22. The song rose to number 11 in its second week and reached a peak of number four during its fourth week in the chart on March 8, 2024 — for the week ending date March 14 — becoming Djo's first top ten song in Britain. Following the release of the Stranger Things series finale, the song re-entered the top ten of the UK Singles Chart in January 2026, and topped the chart for the week ending on January 15 – becoming the second Stranger Things-associated song to do so after "Running Up That Hill" by Kate Bush in June 2022.

On the Billboard Global 200, "End of Beginning" entered the top 10 for the first time during the week dated March 16, 2024, reaching number six. The song rose to number five the following week, and reached its original peak of number three during the week of March 30. Following the conclusion of Stranger Things, the song reentered the top 10, topping the chart during the week dated January 17, 2026.

== Accolades ==
=== Awards and nominations ===
Organization	Year	Category	Result	Ref.
Billboard Music Awards	2024	Top Rock Song	Nominated	
Brit Awards	2025	Best International Song	Nominated	

== Track listing ==
Cassette / digital download

1. "End of Beginning"
2. "End of Beginning" (Instrumental)

== Personnel ==
Personnel taken from Sound on Sound.

- Joe Keery – vocals, guitars, synthesizers
- Adam Thein – bass, synthesizers
- Ted Mathews – drums

== Charts ==
=== Weekly charts ===
Weekly chart performance for "End of Beginning"
Chart (2024–2026)	Peak position
Argentina Hot 100 (Billboard)	23
Australia (ARIA)	3
Austria (Ö3 Austria Top 40)	2
Belgium (Ultratop 50 Flanders)	10
Belgium (Ultratop 50 Wallonia)	21
Bolivia (Billboard)	17
Brazil Hot 100 (Billboard)	39
Canada Hot 100 (Billboard)	5
Canada CHR/Top 40 (Billboard)	29
Canada Hot AC (Billboard)	25
Central America Anglo Airplay (Monitor Latino)	19
Chile (Billboard)	14
Colombia Hot 100 (Billboard)	77
CIS Airplay (TopHit)	43
Costa Rica Anglo Airplay (Monitor Latino)	7
Croatia (Billboard)	7
Czech Republic Airplay (ČNS IFPI)	58
Czech Republic Singles Digital (ČNS IFPI)	1
Denmark (Tracklisten)	11
Dominican Republic Anglo Airplay (Monitor Latino)	6
Ecuador (Billboard)	21
Estonia Airplay (TopHit)	32
Finland (Suomen virallinen lista)	17
France (SNEP)	10
France Airplay (SNEP)	5
Germany (GfK)	2
Global 200 (Billboard)	1
Greece International (IFPI)	1
Honduras Anglo Airplay (Monitor Latino)	4
Hong Kong (Billboard)	10
Hungary (Single Top 40)	6
Iceland (Billboard)	1
India International (IMI)	2
Indonesia (ASIRI)	1
Ireland (IRMA)	2
Israel (Mako Hitlist)	40
Italy (FIMI)	1
Latin America Anglo Airplay (Monitor Latino)	14
Latvia Airplay (TopHit)	142
Latvia Streaming (LaIPA)	1
Lebanon (Lebanese Top 20)	6
Lithuania (AGATA)	1
Luxembourg (Billboard)	2
Malaysia (Billboard)	2
Malta Airplay (Radiomonitor)	14
Mexico Anglo Airplay (Monitor Latino)	6
Middle East and North Africa (IFPI)	4
Netherlands (Dutch Top 40)	11
Netherlands (Single Top 100)	4
New Zealand (Recorded Music NZ)	3
Nigeria (TurnTable Top 100)	66
Norway (VG-lista)	3
Panama Streaming (PRODUCE)	24
Paraguay Anglo Airplay (Monitor Latino)	7
Peru Anglo Airplay (Monitor Latino)	7
Philippines (Billboard)	3
Poland Airplay (OLiS)	2
Poland Streaming (OLiS)	7
Portugal (AFP)	5
Puerto Rico Anglo Airplay (Monitor Latino)	3
Saudi Arabia (IFPI)	4
Singapore (RIAS)	3
Slovakia Airplay (ČNS IFPI)	1
Slovakia Singles Digital (ČNS IFPI)	1
Slovenia Airplay (Radiomonitor)	15
South Africa (Billboard)	16
Spain (Promusicae)	4
Spain Airplay (Promusicae)	1
Sweden (Sverigetopplistan)	1
Switzerland (Schweizer Hitparade)	2
Taiwan (Billboard)	9
Turkey International Airplay (Radiomonitor Türkiye)	5
Ukraine Airplay (TopHit)	97
United Arab Emirates (IFPI)	2
UK Singles (Official Charts)	1
UK Independent (Official Charts)	1
Uruguay Anglo Airplay (Monitor Latino)	12
US Billboard Hot 100	6
US Adult Pop Airplay (Billboard)	13
US Hot Rock & Alternative Songs (Billboard)	1
US Pop Airplay (Billboard)	14
US Rock & Alternative Airplay (Billboard)	5
Vietnam (Vietnam Hot 100)	83

=== Monthly charts ===
Monthly chart performance for "End of Beginning"
Chart (2024–2026)	Peak position
CIS Airplay (TopHit)	44
Estonia Airplay (TopHit)	37
Lithuania Airplay (TopHit)	8
Panama Streaming (PRODUCE)	41
Paraguay Airplay (SGP)	41

=== Year-end charts ===
2024 year-end chart performance for "End of Beginning"
Chart (2024)	Position
Australia (ARIA)	22
Austria (Ö3 Austria Top 40)	38
Belgium (Ultratop 50 Flanders)	49
Canada (Canadian Hot 100)	41
Denmark (Tracklisten)	90
Estonia Airplay (TopHit)	68
Germany (GfK)	64
Global 200 (Billboard)	28
Iceland (Tónlistinn)	37
India International (IMI)	8
Netherlands (Single Top 100)	83
New Zealand (Recorded Music NZ)	20
Philippines (Philippines Hot 100)	18
Poland (Polish Streaming Top 100)	75
Portugal (AFP)	34
Sweden (Sverigetopplistan)	55
Switzerland (Schweizer Hitparade)	30
UK Singles (OCC)	23
US Billboard Hot 100	47
US Adult Top 40 (Billboard)	50
US Hot Rock & Alternative Songs (Billboard)	7
US Mainstream Top 40 (Billboard)	40
US Rock Airplay (Billboard)	15

2025 year-end chart performance for "End of Beginning"
Chart (2025)	Position
Global 200 (Billboard)	92
India International (IMI)	13

== Certifications ==
Certifications for "End of Beginning"
Region	Certification	Certified units/sales
Australia (ARIA)	7× Platinum	490,000^{‡}
Canada (Music Canada)	Platinum	80,000^{‡}
Denmark (IFPI Danmark)	Gold	45,000^{‡}
France (SNEP)	Gold	100,000^{‡}
Germany (BVMI)	Gold	300,000^{‡}
Italy (FIMI)	Gold	50,000^{‡}
Mexico (AMPROFON)	2× Platinum	280,000^{‡}
New Zealand (RMNZ)	5× Platinum	150,000^{‡}
Spain (Promusicae)	2× Platinum	200,000^{‡}
United Kingdom (BPI)	3× Platinum	1,800,000^{‡}
United States (RIAA)	5× Platinum	5,000,000^{‡}
Streaming
Czech Republic (ČNS IFPI)	Platinum	5,000,000
Greece (IFPI Greece)	3× Platinum	6,000,000^{†}
Slovakia (ČNS IFPI)	Platinum	1,700,000
^{‡} Sales+streaming figures based on certification alone.^{†} Streaming-only figures based on certification alone.

== Release history ==
Release dates and format(s) for "End of Beginning"
Region	Date	Format(s)	Label	Ref.
Various	September 16, 2022	Digital download; streaming	Djo Music; AWAL	
Italy	March 1, 2024	Radio airplay	Tune Fit	
Various	May 17, 2024	Cassette	Djo Music; AWAL	
