= Chloe Parché =

Australian musician

- Origin: Sydney, Australia
- Genres: Indie Pop
- Occupations: Singer; songwriter
- Instrument: Vocals
- Years active: 2021–present

Chloe Parché is an Australian singer and songwriter. In March 2026, she released her third EP Sitting Next To Nellie which debuted at number 34 on the ARIA Charts.

== Early life and education ==
In a 2021 interview, Parché said "Both my parents have played instruments throughout their lives as a hobby and growing up i was always doing music lessons and singing and stuff."

== Career ==
=== 2021–present: EPs ===
In March 2021, Parché released their debut single "Moneymaker".

In July 2023, Parché released Crooked her debut EP which saw her support Noah Dillon, Merci, Mercy and Aleksiah.

In November 2025, Parché made her Like a Version debut, covering The Presets' "My People".

In April 2026, Parché announced her third EP will be supported with an Australian tour.

== Discography ==
=== Extended plays ===
List of EPs, with selected details
Title	EP details	Peak chart positions
Title	EP details	AUS
Crooked	Released: July 2023; Format: Digital; Label: Dreams Never Die	—
Split Ends	Released: March 2025; Format: Digital; Label: Chloe Parché	—
Sitting Next to Nellie	Released: May 2026; Format: LP, CD, Digital; Label: AWAL (CPLP001)	34
