= Twenty Twenty (Djo album) =

2019 studio album by Djo

Studio album by Djo
- Released: September 13, 2019
- Genre: Psychedelic rock; psychedelic pop
- Length: 44:04
- Label: Djo Music; AWAL

Djo chronology
Twenty Twenty (2019)	Decide (2022)

Singles from Twenty Twenty
- 1. "Roddy" Released: July 19, 2019; 2. "Chateau (Feel Alright)" Released: August 9, 2019; 3. "Mortal Projections" Released: August 30, 2019

Twenty Twenty is the debut studio album by the American actor and musician Joe Keery, under the stage name Djo. It was independently released on September 13, 2019, and was supported by three singles: "Roddy", "Chateau (Feel Alright)", and "Mortal Projections".

== Singles ==
The lead single, "Roddy", was released on July 19, 2019. The second single, "Chateau (Feel Alright)", was released on August 9, 2019. The third and final single, "Mortal Projections", was released on August 30, 2019.

== Reception ==
The album received mostly positive reviews from critics. Mariel Fechik of Atwood Magazine praised the album's instrumentation, noting the heavy influence of 1960s-era psychedelic rock. Rhian Daly, in a review for NME, gave the album 4 out of 5 stars, comparing it favorably to the work of Tame Impala.

== Track listing ==
All tracks are written by Joe Keery.

Twenty Twenty track listing
No.	Title	Length
1.	"Showtime"	0:48
2.	"Personal Lies"	4:59
3.	"Tentpole Shangrila"	3:36
4.	"Just Along for the Ride"	3:22
5.	"Chateau (Feel Alright)"	4:32
6.	"Roddy"	4:12
7.	"Ring"	4:06
8.	"BNBG"	3:38
9.	"Mortal Projections"	3:08
10.	"Total Control"	2:16
11.	"Flash Mountain"	4:23
12.	"Mutual Future (Repeat)"	4:58
Total length:		44:04

== Personnel ==
- Joe Keery – vocals, guitar, slide guitar, bass, drums, synthesizer, percussion, engineer, mixing
- Adam Thein – additional keyboards, additional vocals, mixing
- Matt Williams – guitar (10)
- Colin Croom – drums (11)
- Cadien Lake James – drum engineer
- Andrew Humphrey – drum engineer
- Heba Kadry – mastering

== Charts ==
Chart performance for Twenty Twenty
Chart (2023)	Peak position
US Tastemaker Albums (Billboard)	7
US Top Album Sales (Billboard)	49
US Vinyl Albums (Billboard)	24
