= Joe Keery =

American actor and musician (born 1992)

- Keery in 2026
- Born: Joseph David Keery; April 1992 (age 34); Newburyport, Massachusetts, U.S.
- Education: DePaul University (BFA)
- Occupations: Actor; singer; musician; songwriter
- Years active: 2015–present
- Musical career
- Also known as: Djo; Cool Cool Cool (formerly)
- Origin: Chicago, Illinois, U.S.
- Genres: Neo-psychedelia; indie rock; psychedelic rock; synth-pop
- Instruments: Vocals; guitar; keyboards; drums
- Label: AWAL
- Member of: Post Animal
- Website: djomusic.com

Joseph David Keery (born April 1992), also known by his musical stage name Djo, is an American actor, singer, musician, and songwriter. He rose to international prominence for his role as Steve Harrington in the sci-fi horror series Stranger Things (2016–2025). He has also starred in films such as Spree (2020) and Free Guy (2021) and the fifth season of the crime drama series Fargo (2023–2024).

As a musician, Keery was a founding member of the psychedelic rock band Post Animal, which he left in 2018 due to acting commitments. Following the departure, he took on the stage name Djo (pronounced "Joe") for his solo musical projects and released the albums Twenty Twenty (2019), Decide (2022), The Crux (2025) and The Crux Deluxe (2025). Decide featured "End of Beginning", which became a sleeper hit and his first Billboard Hot 100 entry after it went viral on TikTok in 2024. He rejoined Post Animal in 2025, during which time he also headlined his solo Back on You World Tour with Post Animal as a supporting act.

== Early life ==
Joseph David Keery was born in April 1992, in Newburyport, Massachusetts, the second of five children. He attended Newburyport High School. When he was younger, he participated in Theater in the Open, a performing arts camp at Maudslay State Park. He acted during high school at his older sister's insistence. He joined The Theatre School at DePaul University in Chicago, graduating in 2014 with a BFA in acting.

== Career ==
=== Acting ===
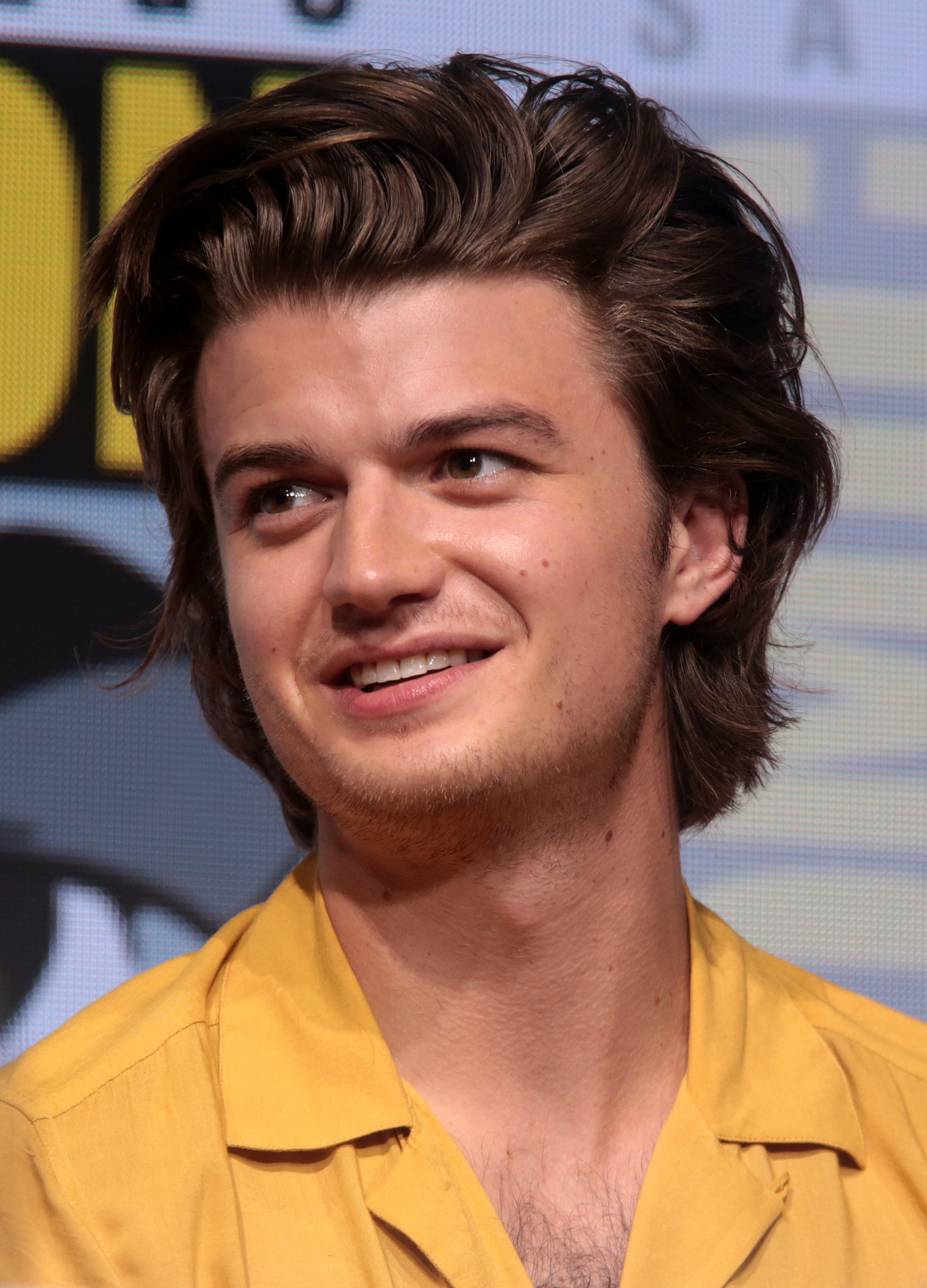
Keery in 2017

Keery's breakthrough role was as Steve Harrington in the Netflix sci-fi series Stranger Things (2016–2025). Having initially auditioned for the role of Jonathan, he later sent in a tape for Steve and was cast in late 2015. The show premiered in 2016 to critical acclaim. He was promoted from recurring cast to a series regular starting with the second season. Before Stranger Things, Keery had appeared in KFC, Domino's, and Amiibo commercials, and had roles in Empire and Chicago Fire. His first appearance in a full-length film was in Stephen Cone's 2015 indie, Henry Gamble's Birthday Party.

Outside of Stranger Things, Keery has had roles in several independent films, including starring in the 2020 satire Spree. He also played the role of Walter "Keys" McKey, a game developer, in the 2021 action comedy Free Guy, which went on to become a box-office hit. In 2022, he was cast opposite Liam Neeson in the sci-fi action film Cold Storage and as Gator Tillman in the fifth season of Fargo. In 2024, he played both Steven Malkmus and himself in the biopic Pavements. In 2025, he voiced John Greenwood in the PBS documentary mini-series The American Revolution.

=== Music ===
In his early twenties, Keery released music under the stage name Cool Cool Cool. From 2014 to 2018, he was a co-founder, drummer, guitarist, and vocalist for the Chicago-based psychedelic rock band Post Animal. Keery originally contributed drums on their first EP Post Animal Perform the Most Curious Water Activities (2015), before current drummer Wesley Toledo joined during their second EP The Garden Series (2016). Their debut full-length album When I Think of You in a Castle (2018) saw Keery performing guitar and vocals.

Keery stopped touring with the band in 2017 and officially left due to acting commitments in 2018. He stated in a Bustle interview, "It's important to disassociate Steve from Stranger Things to the band because I think it will eventually hurt the band... I think it's important that they're hitting the pavement for a while and making a name for themselves and it's not necessarily associated with Stranger Things."

On July 19, 2019, Keery self-released the single "Roddy" under the stage name Djo. Djo released a second single titled "Chateau (Feel Alright)" on August 9, 2019. On September 13, 2019, Djo released his debut album Twenty Twenty. In a positive review of the album, NME called Keery "a musician of very high calibre who... dabbles in the kind of inventive, warped psychedelia that gently twists your melon and constantly shapeshifts around you" and compared his music to that of Tame Impala and Ariel Pink.

On September 9, 2020, he released a new single, "Keep Your Head Up", which is currently the only single by Djo to not be included in a larger album or re-issue. In 2022, he took part in a summer music festival tour. His second album Decide was announced in June 2022, along with the release of its first single "Change". The album was released on September 16, 2022, and received positive reviews. In 2024, the sixth track of the album, "End of Beginning", was released as a single after gaining popularity and becoming viral on social media.

On April 4, 2025, Djo released his third album, The Crux, which was preceded by the singles "Basic Being Basic", "Delete Ya", and "Potion". The album was well received, and the album cover, credited under art director William Wesley II, was nominated for the 2026 Grammy Award for Best Album Cover.

Djo went on the Back on You World Tour in early 2025 to promote the album, with Post Animal as openers for the majority of show dates. On May 2, the tour was extended with the Another Bite Tour, a second leg that mostly covered the United States. During the tour, Post Animal announced their new album Iron, along with Keery's involvement in the album and him re-joining of the band. Iron was preceded by three singles: "Last Goodbye", "Pie in the Sky", and "What's a Good Life" before releasing on July 25th, 2025, around the end of the tour's first leg.

In September 2025, Djo released the singles "Carry the Name", "It's Over", and "Awake" before surprise-releasing the companion album The Crux Deluxe on September 12. Despite its cover and design mirroring that of The Crux, Keery stated that he does not consider it a reissue of that album. Deluxe features 12 new tracks that were written at the same time as The Crux and recorded after its release.

On November 4, Djo announced another tour in South America and Mexico to begin in March 2026. (Note: The announcement was made through the Instagram account "Djocorp", which is an official updates account that fans received a link to through Djo's mailing list. The post was later shared to Djo's story on his main account.) Following the tour, Djo is set to support Tame Impala for the first leg of the 2026 Deadbeat tour.

Keery co-wrote the song "Funny Mouth" for Charli XCX's soundtrack to the 2026 film Wuthering Heights.

== Personal life ==
Keery was in a relationship with actress Maika Monroe from 2017 to 2023. In 2023, he moved from Los Angeles to the West Village in New York City. He briefly dated actress Chase Sui Wonders from late 2023 to early 2024.

== Filmography ==
=== Film ===
Year	Title	Role(s)	Notes	Ref(s)
2015	Henry Gamble's Birthday Party	Gabe	Debut film	
2016	The Charnel House	Scott		
2017	Molly's Game	Trust Fund Cole		
2018	After Everything	Chris		
2018	Slice	Jackson		
2019	How to Be Alone	Jack / The Gimp	Short film	
2020	Spree	Kurt Kunkle		
2020	Death to 2020	Duke Goolies		
2021	Free Guy	Walter "Keys" McKeys		
2021	Death to 2021	Duke Goolies		
2023	Finalmente l'alba	Sean Lockwood		
2024	Marmalade	Baron Lamram		
2024	Pavements	Stephen Malkmus, Himself		
2026	Cold Storage	Travis "Teacake" Meacham		

=== Television ===
Year	Title	Role	Notes	Ref(s)
2015	Sirens	Scenester	Episode: "Screw the One Percent"	
2015	Chicago Fire	Emmett	2 episodes	
2015	Empire	Tony Trichter III	Episode: "Who I Am"	
2016–2025	Stranger Things	Steve Harrington	Recurring role (season 1); Main role (season 2–5)	
2019–2021	No Activity	Officer Ed Reinhardt	Recurring role (season 3–4); Voice (season 4)	
2023–2024	Fargo	Gator Tillman	Main role (season 5)	
2025	The American Revolution	John Greenwood (voice)	4 episodes	
2026	One Last Adventure: The Making of Stranger Things 5	Himself	Documentary	

=== Theatre ===
Year	Title	Role	Venue	Ref(s)
2026	Other Desert Cites	Trip Wyeth	Hudson Theatre	

=== Music videos ===
Year	Title	Artist	Ref(s)
2025	"Loser"	Tame Impala	

=== Video games ===
Year	Title	Role	Notes	Ref(s)
2019	Dead by Daylight	Steve Harrington	Likeness	

== Discography ==
=== Studio albums ===
List of studio albums, with selected details, chart positions, and certifications
Title	Details	Peak chart positions										Certifications
Title	Details	US	AUS	BEL (FL)	CAN	GER	LTU	NLD	NZ	SCO	UK	Certifications
Twenty Twenty	Released: September 13, 2019; Label: Djo Music (via AWAL); Format: Digital download, streaming, LP	—	—	—	—	—	—	—	—	—	—	
Decide	Released: September 16, 2022; Label: Djo Music (via AWAL); Format: Digital download, streaming, CD, LP, cassette	24	—	180	35	16	55	10	—	33	— (Note: Decide did not enter the UK Albums Chart, but peaked at number 67 on the UK Albums Sales Chart.)	RMNZ: Platinum
The Crux	Released: April 4, 2025; Label: Djo Music (via AWAL); Format: Digital download, streaming, CD, LP, cassette	50	19	7	96	71	89	23	27	11	54	
"—" denotes releases that did not chart or were not released in that territory.

=== Extended plays ===
List of extended plays, with selected details
Title	Details
D-Sides	Released: November 17, 2023; Label: Djo Music, AWAL; Format: Digital download, streaming

=== Singles ===
List of singles, with selected chart positions, certifications, and album name
Title	Year	Peak chart positions										Certifications	Album
Title	Year	US	AUS	CAN	IRE	ITA	NLD	NZ	SWE	UK	WW	Certifications	Album
"Roddy"	2019	—	—	—	—	—	—	—	—	—	—		Twenty Twenty
"Chateau (Feel Alright)"	2019	—	—	—	—	—	—	—	—	—	—	RIAA: Gold	Twenty Twenty
"Mortal Projections"	2019	—	—	—	—	—	—	—	—	—	—		Twenty Twenty
"Keep Your Head Up"	2020	—	—	—	—	—	—	—	—	—	—		Non-album single
"Change"	2022	—	—	—	—	—	—	—	—	—	—		Decide
"Gloom"	2022	—	—	—	—	—	—	—	—	—	—		Decide
"Figure You Out"	2022	—	—	—	—	—	—	—	—	—	—		Decide
"Half Life"	2022	—	—	—	—	—	—	—	—	—	—		Decide
"End of Beginning"	2024	6	3	5	2	1	4	3	1	1	1	RIAA: 5× Platinum; ARIA: 7× Platinum; BPI: 3× Platinum; FIMI: Gold; MC: Platinum; RMNZ: 5× Platinum	Decide
"Basic Being Basic"	2025	—	—	—	81	—	—	— (Note: "Basic Being Basic" did not enter the NZ Top 40 Singles Chart, but peaked at number 11 on the NZ Hot Singles Chart.)	—	62	—		The Crux
"Delete Ya"	2025	—	—	—	78	—	—	— (Note: "Delete Ya" did not enter the NZ Top 40 Singles Chart, but peaked at number 25 on the NZ Hot Singles Chart.)	—	74	—		The Crux
"Potion"	2025	—	—	—	—	—	—	— (Note: "Potion" did not enter the NZ Top 40 Singles Chart, but peaked at number 16 on the NZ Hot Singles Chart.)	—	—	—		The Crux
"Carry the Name"	2025	—	—	—	—	—	—	—	—	—	—		The Crux Deluxe
"It's Over"	2025	—	—	—	—	—	—	—	—	—	—		The Crux Deluxe
"Awake"	2025	—	—	—	—	—	—	—	—	—	—		The Crux Deluxe
"—" denotes single that did not chart or was not released in that territory.

=== Other charted songs ===
List of other charted songs, with selected chart positions, and album name
Title	Year	Peak chart positions	Album
Title	Year	US Rock	Album
"Charlie's Garden"	2025	44	The Crux

=== Songwriting credits ===
List of songs written or co-written for other artists, showing year released and album name
Title	Year	Artist	Album	Notes
"Funny Mouth"	2026	Charli XCX	Wuthering Heights	Co-written with Charli XCX and Finn Keane

== Awards and nominations ==
=== Acting career ===
Award	Year	Nominated work	Category	Result	Ref.
Screen Actors Guild Awards	2017	Stranger Things	Outstanding Performance by an Ensemble in a Drama Series	Won	
Screen Actors Guild Awards	2018	Stranger Things	Outstanding Performance by an Ensemble in a Drama Series	Nominated	
Screen Actors Guild Awards	2019	Stranger Things	Outstanding Performance by an Ensemble in a Drama Series	Nominated	
Teen Choice Awards	2018	Stranger Things	Choice Hissy Fit	Nominated	
The Astra Awards	2022	Stranger Things	Best Supporting Actor in a Streaming Series, Drama	Nominated	
The Astra Awards	2024	Fargo	Best Supporting Actor in a Limited Series or TV Movie	Nominated	

=== Musical career ===
Award	Year	Nominee(s)/work(s)	Category	Result	Ref.
American Music Awards	2025	"End of Beginning"	Social Song of the Year	Nominated	
Billboard Music Awards	2024	"End of Beginning"	Top Rock Song	Nominated	
Brit Awards	2025	"End of Beginning"	Best International Song	Nominated	
Grammy Awards	2026	The Crux	Best Album Cover	Nominated	
IHeartRadio Music Awards	2025	Himself	Best New Alternative/Rock Artist	Nominated	
Kids' Choice Awards	2024	Himself	Favorite Social Music Star	Nominated	
Kids' Choice Awards	2025	Himself	Favorite Male Breakout Artist	Nominated	
LOS40 Music Awards	2026	Himself	Best International New Act	Pending	
LOS40 Music Awards	2026	"End of Beginning"	Best International Song	Pending	
NRJ Music Awards	2026	Himself	International Revelation of the Year	Pending	

== Tours ==
Headlining

- Back on You World Tour (2025)
- South America & Mexico Tour (2026)
- Summer North American Tour (2026)

Supporting

- Noah Kahan (2025)
- Gracie Abrams – The Secret of Us Deluxe Tour (2025)
- Tame Impala – Deadbeat Tour (2026)
