= AWAL =

British music distribution subsidiary of Sony Music

- Parent company: Kobalt Music Group (2012–2021); Sony Music Entertainment (2021–present)
- Founded: 1997
- Founder: Denzyl Feigelson; Kevin Bacon; Jonathan Quarmby
- Status: Active
- Distributor: Proper Music Distribution (physical)
- Genre: Various
- Country of origin: United Kingdom
- Location: London
- Official website: www.awal.com

AWAL (an initialism of Artists Without a Label) is a global recording business that serves as an alternative to the traditional record label, offering deal structures that provide artists with the resources and expertise of a global label while allowing them to retain ownership and control of their music.

Since 2021, AWAL has been owned by Sony Music, following its acquisition from Kobalt Music Group for $430 million.

== Services ==
AWAL's services include global marketing and creative services, A&R, playlist and radio promotion, publicity, sync licensing, brand partnerships, and access to comprehensive real-time music data and insights. In March 2017, AWAL introduced its music analytics app, designed to collect and display data from an artist's Spotify and Apple Music presence. In November 2018, Billboard published an article titled "Can Kobalt Disrupt the Label Game With AWAL", outlining the company's approach and noting that it pays out as much as 80 percent of streaming revenue to its artists.

== History ==
AWAL US was originally founded in 1997 by Denzyl Feigelson in Ojai, California, with mentorship help from founding member Andrew Ungerleider, and then joined forces in 2004 with record producers Kevin Bacon and Jonathan Quarmby.

Paul Bower ran the AWAL Sheffield office since 2004.

In December 2012, AWAL UK was acquired by the Kobalt Music Group and operated as the company's digital music distribution arm.

In January 2018, Lonny Olinick was named CEO of Kobalt's recording division. By March 2018, Kobalt announced it was investing $150 million into AWAL and that all of Kobalt's recording business would be combined under the AWAL brand. AWAL acquired In2une Music in June 2018, which provides multi-format radio promotion to independent labels and artists. AWAL announced a strategic partnership with independent label Glassnote Records in November 2018. Other announcements from the company include signing artists such as Steve Lacy, Finneas, Little Simz, Girl in Red, deadmau5, JVKE, Jungle, Disclosure, Rex Orange County, Tom Misch, and Laufey.

In November 2018, AWAL was named on Billboard's 2018 Digital Power Players - Music Groups list. In April 2023, AWAL was named on Billboard's 2023 International Power Players list. Later that year, Billboard named AWAL's Lonny Olinick, Pete Giberga, and Paul Hitchman to their 2023 Indie Power Players list.

AWAL has offices in London, New York, Los Angeles, Berlin, Stockholm, Mexico City, Madrid, Mumbai, Rio de Janeiro, Sydney, Paris and Toronto.

On September 7, 2021, the Competition and Markets Authority (CMA), the United Kingdom's antitrust regulator raised concerns that Sony's purchase of AWAL would reduce competition from other distributors. The CMA gave Sony and AWAL five days to address the CMA's concerns and offer legally binding remedies, or else the CMA would enter a Phase 2 investigation. The phase two investigation was launched on September 16, 2021. Following a consultation that ended on March 4, 2022, the CMA officially cleared the deal on March 16, 2022.

== Artists ==
- Aly & AJ
- A$AP TyY
- Banks
- The Beaches
- Ber
- BoyWithUke
- Bruno Major
- Chloe Parché
- CKay
- Claudia Alende
- CMAT
- Dashboard Confessional
- Dayglow
- Daði Freyr
- De La Soul
- Die Antwoord
- DijahSB
- Disclosure
- Djo
- Esprit D'Air
- Ethel Cain
- Everything Everything
- Elita Harkov (physical releases only)
- The Aubreys
- Frank Carter & the Rattlesnakes
- Gabrielle Aplin
- Girl in Red
- Greyson Chance
- Gus Dapperton
- Jae Jin
- Jesse McCartney
- James Marriott
- JPEGMAFIA
- Jungle
- JVKE
- iamamiwhoami
- INJI
- ionnalee
- Katelyn Tarver
- The Kooks
- Kim Petras
- Kira Kosarin
- Laufey
- Laura Marling
- Lauren Jauregui
- Lauv
- Lil Peep
- Lisa Heller
- Little Simz
- Lizzy McAlpine
- Lovejoy
- Luvcat
- Madison Beer
- Maximum Love
- Moby
- mxmtoon
- Naked Eyes
- Nick Cave and the Bad Seeds
- The Night Café
- Now United
- Pouya
- Quadeca
- R3HAB
- Rex Orange County
- RMR
- Rickie Lee Jones
- Rio Romeo
- Sawyer Hill
- SBTRKT
- Simi
- Spacey Jane
- Steve Lacy
- Sub Urban
- Tamera Foster
- Thom Yorke
- Todd Terje
- Tom Misch
- Vérité
- Wasia Project
- Wilt
- The Wombats
- Wretch 32
- You Me at Six
- Young the Giant
- Yung Bans
- Zolita

== Record labels ==
- Glassnote Records
- mau5trap
- Good Soldier Songs
- Nickelodeon Records
- B-Unique Records
- SideOneDummy Records
- World in Red (personal label for Girl in Red)
- Chess Club Records
- Bright Antenna Records

== Albums released ==
- Come Over When You're Sober, Pt. 1 (2017) — Lil Peep
- Fuzzybrain (2018) — Dayglow
- Friends (2019) — Omar Apollo
- Grey Area (2019) — Little Simz
- Portraits (2019) — Greyson Chance
- Twenty Twenty (2019) — Djo
- Bonito Recycling (2020) — Kero Kero Bonito
- Idiot Prayer (2020) — Nick Cave
- Orca (2020) — Gus Dapperton
- Sunlight (2020) — Spacey Jane
- Inbred (2021) — Ethel Cain
- A Touch of the Beat Gets You Up on Your Feet Gets You Out and Then Into the Sun (2021) — Aly & AJ
- Back in Love City (2021) — The Vaccines
- Harmony House (2021) — Dayglow
- If I Could Make It Go Quiet (2021) — Girl in Red
- From Me to You (2021) — Quadeca
- In Search Of Darkness (2021) — Chvrches
- Loving in Stereo (2021) — Jungle
- Sometimes I Might Be Introvert (2021) — Little Simz
- 10 Tracks to Echo in the Dark (2022) — The Kooks
- All the Truth That I Can Tell (2022) — Dashboard Confessional
- Decide (2022) — Djo
- Five Seconds Flat (2022) — Lizzy McAlpine
- Fix Yourself, Not the World (2022) — The Wombats
- Forever (2022) — Phife Dawg
- Here Comes Everybody (2022) — Spacey Jane
- No Thank You (2022) — Little Simz
- People in Motion (2022) — Dayglow
- Preacher's Daughter (2022) — Ethel Cain
- Rising (2022) — Mxmtoon
- Serpentina (2022) — Banks
- Under the Shade of Green (2022) — The Happy Fits
- I Didn't Mean to Haunt You (2022) — Quadeca
- Living Somple (2023) - DijahSB
- With Love From (2023) — Aly & AJ
- Scaring the Hoes (2023) — JPEGMAFIA and Danny Brown
- The Musical: Welcome to the Night of Your Life (2023) — Now United and Lilith Freund
- Sundial(2023) - Noname
- Scrapyard (2024) — Quadeca
- I Lay Down My Life for You (2024) — JPEGMAFIA
- Burnout (2024) — BoyWithUke
- If Nevermore (2025) — Sub Urban
- A Matter of Time (2025) — Laufey
- SUPERLAME (2025) — INJI
- Sunshine (2026) — Jungle
