= Music of Stranger Things =

American television series soundtrack

The Stranger Things original music score soundtracks are composed by Kyle Dixon and Michael Stein of the electronic band Survive. They make extensive use of synthesizers in the styles of 1980s artists and film composers including Jean-Michel Jarre, Tangerine Dream, Vangelis, Goblin, John Carpenter, Giorgio Moroder, and Fabio Frizzi. The soundtrack includes period music from the artists: The Clash, Joy Division, Duran Duran, Toto, New Order, Kate Bush, Madonna, The Bangles, Foreigner, Echo and the Bunnymen, Queen, Kiss, Peter Gabriel, Scorpions and Corey Hart, as well as excerpts from Tangerine Dream, John Carpenter, and Vangelis.

== Original music score production ==
Kyle Dixon and Michael Stein's music, produced and performed by their band Survive, was featured in the 2014 thriller film The Guest. The Duffer Brothers saw the film. While creating a mock trailer that was later used to sell the show to Netflix, the Duffers used Survive's piece "Dirge" to serve as the trailer's soundtrack.

Once the show was green-lit, the Duffers contacted Survive around July 2015 to ask if the group was still together and available to potentially score the season. Then, Dixon and Stein provided the production team with dozens of unreleased tracks from their band's past. The Duffers were ecstatic after listening to the material provided, and they implored the duo to quit their day jobs to produce music for the show full-time. Dixon and Stein were hired before the casting process, and their motif demos were used and played over the actors' audition tapes, as part the casting selection. The two worked with producers to select some of their older music to rework for the show while simultaneously developing new music which was to chiefly serve as character motifs. The tracks produced by the duo were sent during filming to The Duffers, who later labelled the demos as "sketches" due to Dixon and Stein's odd title choices ("Jupiter 8 Spirit Winds," "Soakers Forum 3," and "Lighting Candles and Eggy Pizza" are among the most unique of the batch). A "sketch" that was originally titled "Prophecy" was later developed into the show's theme. In all, just under 14 hours of music was produced for the show over the course of one year.

== Show theme ==
The show's theme is based on an unused piece Stein composed much earlier that ended up in a library of work used by the Duffers as a "big pool to grab from" when editing the show. For the theme Stein and Dixon tried several ideas, but taking from the demos, the Duffers found the theme and thought that with some reworking it would be good for the opening credits. It had originally been placed in a Dropbox folder set aside for if a client wanted to license music from the composers or if they needed something cinematic. Dixon and Stein proceeded to retool the demo, and on the staff's suggestion, made it "bigger, bolder and kind of build to a climax," a goal that was ultimately achieved with the inclusion of Prophet V, Roland SH-2, and Mellotron synthesizers, coupled with the usage of various filters. They also produced additional versions that varied in length, so as to ease the integration of the theme into the as-of-then uncompleted, tentative opening sequence.

After the release of the show's first season and its meteoric rise in popularity that followed, Dixon and Stein's composition quickly gained a large amount of popularity as well. Various musical entertainers such as the band Blink-182 have used the track in their live productions, and a number of amateur musicians have posted cover versions to YouTube. The piece also won the award for Outstanding Original Main Title Theme Music at the 69th Primetime Creative Arts Emmy Awards.

== Releases ==
=== Soundtracks ===
Year	Title	Composer(s)
2016	Stranger Things, Vol. 1	Kyle Dixon and Michael Stein
2016	Stranger Things, Vol. 2	Kyle Dixon and Michael Stein
2017	Stranger Things 2	Kyle Dixon and Michael Stein
2019	Stranger Things 3	Kyle Dixon and Michael Stein
2022	Stranger Things 4	Kyle Dixon and Michael Stein
2025	Stranger Things 5	Kyle Dixon and Michael Stein
2026	Stranger Things: The Orchestral Cues	Dan Romer and Rob Simonsen

=== Compilations ===
Year	Title	Artist(s)
2017	Stranger Things: Music from the Netflix Original Series	Various
2018	Stranger Things: Halloween Sounds from the Upside Down	Kyle Dixon and Michael Stein
2019	Stranger Things: Music from the Netflix Original Series, Season 3	Various
2022	Stranger Things: Music from the Netflix Original Series, Season 4	Various
2026	Stranger Things: Soundtrack from the Netflix Series, Season 5	Various

== Period music ==
In addition to original music, Stranger Things features period music from artists including The Clash, Joy Division, Duran Duran, Toto, New Order, Madonna, The Bangles, Foreigner, Echo and the Bunnymen, Queen, Peter Gabriel, and Corey Hart, as well as excerpts from Tangerine Dream, John Carpenter, and Vangelis. In particular, a number of famous popular songs from the 1970s and 1980s play an important role in the narrative and/or marketing of the show.

=== "Should I Stay or Should I Go" ===
"Should I Stay or Should I Go" by the English punk rock band the Clash was specifically picked to play at pivotal moments of the first season, such as when Will is trying to communicate with Joyce from the Upside Down. According to Bill Desowitz of IndieWire, the song's subject of a tumultuous end to a relationship is given a new light in the context of the series, where it "becomes a way of calming Will when he sings it in the Upside Down, and a way of reminding Joyce and Jonathan that he's still alive, lifting their spirits as well." The Duffers found this song of particular importance to the main narrative, though The Clash were reluctant to lend their song to a show they perceived to be about "monsters from an alternative world" that may denigrate its original cultural significance and meaning. The brothers left it up to the show's music supervisor, the Grammy-winning Nora Felder, to obtain the rights to use the song. She convinced the band to lend the narrative their song after downplaying the role of the monster, explaining that the show is more about the "bonds between family." After the song's usage was approved, Felder made an effort to "protect [the band]" from being trivialized, specifically with the context of the song's use in conjunction with the happenings on-screen. The Duffers weren't made aware of the struggle to obtain the rights to the song's usage until Felder spoke about the process during an event held by Variety magazine.

=== "The NeverEnding Story" ===
Of note in the third season was the use of "The NeverEnding Story", the theme to the 1984 film of the same name, which is used in the final episode when Suzie refuses to provide the critical code until Dustin sings it with her. The Duffers had wanted to introduce Suzie into the show's narrative in some dramatic fashion while giving Gaten Matarazzo, who has sung on Broadway before, a chance to show off his own vocals. Initially, they were planning to use "The Ent and the Entwife" song from The Lord of the Rings, but aware that Amazon Studios were developing its own Lord of the Rings series, decided to change direction. The Duffers credit writer Curtis Gwinn for using "The NeverEnding Story" as the replacement. Matarazzo and Gabriella Pizzolo, the actress playing Suzie and also a seasoned singer on Broadway, were on sets near each other when they sang the song together and were able to harmonize the song as well without the backing music. As their characters were not meant to be in that much synchronization due to being in two different places, the song's backing track and some autotuning were used to blend their singing to their respective settings and the tone of the soundtrack. According to the cast and to composers Kyle Dixon and Michael Stein, the song became an earworm for many of the cast on the day that scene was filmed. Later in the episode, Lucas and Max, played by Caleb McLaughlin and Sadie Sink, sing the song in duet back to Dustin to mock him; both McLaughlin and Sink also have had experience in Broadway musicals. As a result of its appearance in the series, "The NeverEnding Story" drew an 800% increase in viewership and streaming requests on YouTube and Spotify over the days after initial broadcast, putting Limahl, the song's artist, briefly back in the spotlight.

=== "Running Up That Hill" ===
"Running Up That Hill" by English musician Kate Bush features prominently in the fourth episode of the fourth season, and is re-used in subsequent episodes. Resurgence in interest pushed the song to the top ten of several record charts around the world, most notably reaching number one in the UK, where it became the country's "Song of the Summer" for 2022, according to the Official Charts Company. It also reached #3 on the Billboard Hot 100, becoming Bush's highest-charting entry and first top ten song in the United States.

=== Koyaanisqatsi and Akhnaten ===
A scene in the seventh episode of the fourth season, where Henry Creel recounts his backstory to Eleven and is interlaced with scenes of Nancy Wheeler in the Upside Down version of Henry's house, is accompanied by "Prophecies" from the 1982 film Koyaanisqatsi, and "Window of Appearances" and "Akhnaten and Nefertiti" from the opera Akhnaten written by Philip Glass.

== Accolades ==
Year	Award	Category	Recipient	Result	Ref.
2016	Hollywood Music in Media Awards	Best Main Title – TV Show/Digital Streaming Series	Kyle Dixon and Michael Stein	Nominated	
2016	Hollywood Music in Media Awards	Best Original Score – TV Show/Miniseries	Kyle Dixon and Michael Stein	Nominated	
2016	Hollywood Music in Media Awards	Outstanding Music Supervision – Television	Nora Felder	Won	
2017	Grammy Awards	Best Score Soundtrack for Visual Media	Stranger Things, Vol. 1	Nominated	
2017	Grammy Awards	Best Score Soundtrack for Visual Media	Stranger Things, Vol. 2	Nominated	
2017	Primetime Emmy Awards	Outstanding Original Main Title Theme Music	Kyle Dixon and Michael Stein	Won	
2018	Grammy Awards	Best Compilation Soundtrack for Visual Media	Stranger Things: Music from the Netflix Original Series	Nominated	
2023	Grammy Awards	Best Compilation Soundtrack for Visual Media	Stranger Things: Music from the Netflix Original Series, Season 4 (Vol. 2)	Nominated	
