= List of awards and nominations received by Stranger Things =

Awards and nominations received by Stranger Things
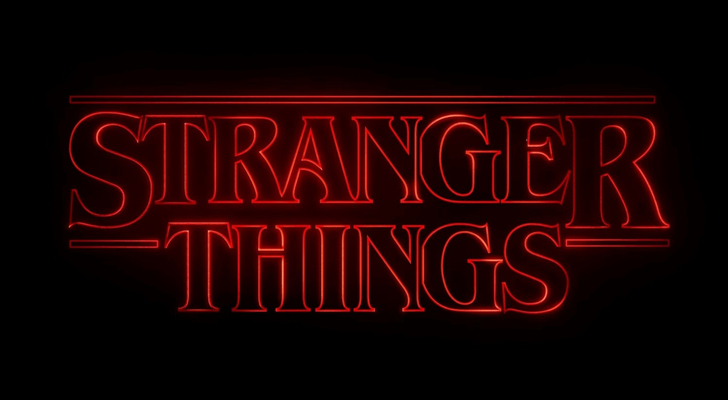
Awards and nominations
Award	Wins	Nominations
AFI Awards	2	2
American Cinema Editors Awards	0	3
Art Directors Guild Awards	0	4
Artios Awards	0	1
Bram Stoker Awards	1	4
British Academy Games Awards	0	1
British Academy Television Awards	0	1
Cinema Audio Society Awards	0	3
Costume Designers Guild Awards	0	2
Critics' Choice Super Awards	1	2
Critics' Choice Television Awards	1	4
Directors Guild of America Awards	0	2
Dorian Awards	0	2
Dragon Awards	1	1
Empire Awards	0	3
Fangoria Chainsaw Awards	3	4
Golden Globe Awards	0	4
Golden Reel Awards	4	12
Golden Trailer Awards	4	5
Grammy Awards	0	5
Guild of Music Supervisors Awards	3	5
Hollywood Critics Association TV Awards	1	9
Hollywood Music in Media Awards	1	3
Hollywood Post Alliance	2	2
Hugo Awards	0	2
ICG Publicists Awards	1	1
IFMCA Awards	0	1
IGN Awards	2	6
IGN People's Choice Awards	2	6
Kids' Choice Awards	9	25
Location Managers Guild Awards	0	2
Makeup Artist and Hair Stylist Guild Awards	1	9
MTV Millennial Awards	1	1
MTV Movie & TV Awards	8	18
NAACP Image Awards	1	1
National Television Awards	0	1
NME Awards	1	2
Peabody Awards	1	2
People's Choice Awards	6	14
Primetime Emmy Awards	13	64
Producers Guild of America Awards	1	2
Satellite Awards	1	5
Saturn Awards	4	18
Screen Actors Guild Awards	2	11
Shorty Awards	0	1
Society of Camera Operators Awards	1	2
TCA Awards	0	3
Teen Choice Awards	4	19
Visual Effects Society Awards	2	11
World Soundtrack Awards	0	1
Writers Guild of America Awards	0	3
Young Artist Awards	0	6

Totals (Note: Certain award groups do not simply award one winner. They acknowledge several different recipients, have runners-up, and have third place. Since this is a specific recognition and is different from losing an award, runner-up mentions are considered wins in this award tally. For simplification and to avoid errors, each award in this list has been presumed to have had a prior nomination.)
- Wins: 89
- Nominations: 275

Stranger Things is an American streaming television series created by the Duffer Brothers for Netflix, which features an ensemble cast. It is set in the fictional rural town of Hawkins, Indiana, in the 1980s. The Hawkins National Laboratory ostensibly performs scientific research for the United States Department of Energy, but secretly conducts experiments on the paranormal and supernatural, frequently employing human subjects. These experiments inadvertently create a portal to an alternate dimension known as the Upside Down, which begins to affect the residents of Hawkins in calamitous ways. The first season was released in its entirety on Netflix on July 15, 2016, followed by the second season on October 27, 2017, and the third season on July 4, 2019. The fourth season was released in two volumes on May 27 and July 1, 2022, respectively. The fifth and final season was released in three segments: two volumes on November 26 and December 25, 2025, respectively, followed by the finale on December 31.

Throughout its run, the series has received positive reviews and numerous accolades for its writing, acting, direction, production values, visual effects, and soundtrack. Stranger Things has been nominated for many awards, including 64 Primetime Emmy Awards (13 wins), four Golden Globe Awards, four Grammy Awards, four Critics' Choice Television Awards (one win), 13 Saturn Awards (four wins), two Producers Guild of America Awards (one win), three Writers Guild of America Awards, and two Peabody Awards (one win). It was also selected by the American Film Institute as one of its top 10 television programs of the year for the first two seasons.

The main cast has been nominated for three Screen Actors Guild Award for Outstanding Performance by an Ensemble in a Drama Series nominations, winning in 2017. Millie Bobby Brown is the most nominated member of the cast. Brown, David Harbour, and Winona Ryder have received individual Screen Actors Guild Award nominations for their performances in the series. Brown and Harbour also received two Primetime Emmy Award nominations, while Harbour and Ryder were each nominated for a Golden Globe Award.

== Total awards and nominations for the cast ==
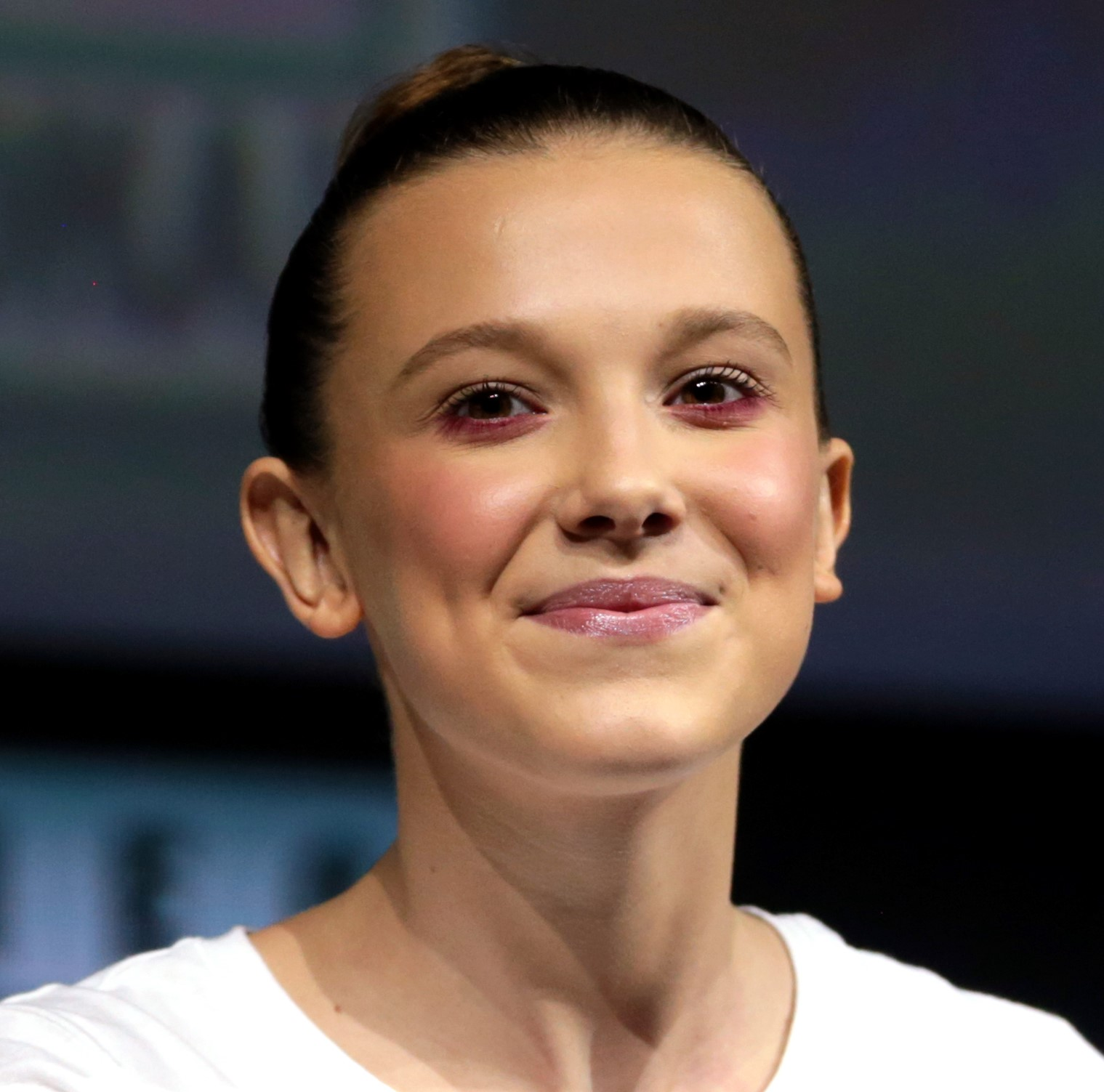
Millie Bobby Brown is the series' most successful cast member in terms of awards, having won 20 awards and received 32 additional nominations.

Total awards and nominations for the cast
Actor	Character	Nominations	Awards
Millie Bobby Brown	Jane "Eleven" Hopper	33	12
Finn Wolfhard	Mike Wheeler	12	1
Winona Ryder	Joyce Byers	11	3
David Harbour	Jim Hopper	11	2
Caleb McLaughlin	Lucas Sinclair	10	2
Noah Schnapp	Will Byers	9	5
Gaten Matarazzo	Dustin Henderson	9	2
Joe Keery	Steve Harrington	6	2
Sadie Sink	Max Mayfield	5	1
Natalia Dyer	Nancy Wheeler	4	1
Charlie Heaton	Jonathan Byers	4	1
Cara Buono	Karen Wheeler	3	1
Maya Hawke	Robin Buckley	3	1
Dacre Montgomery	Billy Hargrove	3	0
Jamie Campbell Bower	Vecna	3	0
Joe Chrest	Ted Wheeler	2	1
Matthew Modine	Martin Brenner	1	1
Rob Morgan	Powell	1	1
John Paul Reynolds	Callahan	1	1
Mark Steger	Monster	1	1
Joseph Quinn	Eddie Munson	1	1
Sean Astin	Bob Newby	1	0
Jake Busey	Bruce	1	0
Catherine Curtin	Claudia Henderson	1	0
Cary Elwes	Larry Kline	1	0
Priah Ferguson	Erica Sinclair	1	0
Brett Gelman	Murray Bauman	1	0
Andrey Ivchenko	Grigori	1	0
Michael Park	Tom Holloway	1	0
Shannon Purser	Barbara "Barb" Holland	1	0
Francesca Reale	Heather Holloway	1	0
Paul Reiser	Sam Owens	1	0

== Awards and nominations ==
Awards and nominations received by Stranger Things
Award	Year (Note: Indicates the year of ceremony.)	Category	Nominee(s)	Result	Ref.
AFI Awards	2016	Top 10 TV Programs of the Year	Stranger Things	Won	
AFI Awards	2017	Top 10 TV Programs of the Year	Stranger Things	Won	
American Cinema Editors Awards	2017	Best Edited One Hour Series for Non-Commercial Television	Dean Zimmerman (for "Chapter One: The Vanishing of Will Byers")	Nominated	
American Cinema Editors Awards	2017	Best Edited One Hour Series for Non-Commercial Television	Kevin D. Ross (for "Chapter Seven: The Bathtub")	Nominated	
American Cinema Editors Awards	2018	Best Edited Drama Series for Non-Commercial Television	Kevin D. Ross (for "Chapter Nine: The Gate")	Nominated	
Art Directors Guild Awards	2017	One-Hour Period or Fantasy Single-Camera Television Series	Chris Trujillo (for "Chapter One: The Vanishing of Will Byers", "Chapter Three: Holly, Jolly", and "Chapter Eight: The Upside Down")	Nominated	
Art Directors Guild Awards	2018	One-Hour Period or Fantasy Single-Camera Television Series	Chris Trujillo (for "Chapter Six: The Spy", "Chapter Eight: The Mind Flayer", and "Chapter Nine: The Gate")	Nominated	
Art Directors Guild Awards	2023	One-Hour Period or Fantasy Single-Camera Television Series	Chris Trujillo (for "Chapter Seven: The Massacre at Hawkins Lab")	Nominated	
Art Directors Guild Awards	2026	One-Hour Period or Fantasy Single-Camera Television Series	Chris Trujillo (for "Chapter Four: Sorcerer")	Nominated	
Artios Awards	2018	Television Pilot and First Season – Drama	Carmen Cuba, Tara Feldstein Bennett, Chase Paris, and Wittney Horton	Nominated	
Bram Stoker Awards	2016	Superior Achievement in a Screenplay	The Duffer Brothers (for "Chapter One: The Vanishing of Will Byers")	Nominated	
Bram Stoker Awards	2016	Superior Achievement in a Screenplay	The Duffer Brothers (for "Chapter Eight: The Upside Down")	Nominated	
Bram Stoker Awards	2017	Superior Achievement in a Screenplay	The Duffer Brothers (for "Chapter One: MADMAX")	Nominated	
Bram Stoker Awards	2022	Superior Achievement in a Screenplay	The Duffer Brothers (for "Chapter One: The Hellfire Club")	Won	
British Academy Games Awards	2018	Mobile Game	BonusXP, Inc. (for Stranger Things: The Game)	Nominated	
British Academy Television Awards	2017	Best International Program	Matt Duffer, Ross Duffer, Shawn Levy, Dan Cohen	Nominated	
Cinema Audio Society Awards	2017	Outstanding Achievement in Sound Mixing for Television Series – One Hour	Chris Durfy, Joe Barnett, Adam Jenkins, Judah Getz, and John Guentner (for "Chapter Seven: The Bathtub")	Nominated	
Cinema Audio Society Awards	2018	Outstanding Achievement in Sound Mixing for Television Series – One Hour	Michael P. Clark, Joe Barnett, Adam Jenkins, Bill Higley, and Anthony Zeller (for "Chapter Eight: The Mind Flayer")	Nominated	
Cinema Audio Society Awards	2020	Outstanding Achievement in Sound Mixing for Television Series – One Hour	Michael Rayle, Mark Paterson, Will Files, Hector Carlos Ramirez, Bill Higley, and Peter Persuad (for "Chapter Eight: The Battle of Starcourt")	Nominated	
Cinema Audio Society Awards	2026	Outstanding Achievement in Sound Mixing for Television Series – One Hour	Michael P. Clark, Mark Paterson, Will Files, Steve Neal, Craig Henighan, Carlos Remirez, Judah Getz (for "Chapter Eight: The Rightside Up")	Nominated	
Costume Designers Guild Awards	2017	Outstanding Period Television Series	Kimberly Adams and Malgosia Turzanska	Nominated	
Costume Designers Guild Awards	2018	Excellence in Period Television	Kim Wilcox	Nominated	
Critics' Choice Super Awards	2023	Best Science Fiction/Fantasy Series	Stranger Things	Won (Note: Also awarded to Andor)	
Critics' Choice Super Awards	2023	Best Villain in a Series	Jamie Campbell Bower	Nominated	
Critics' Choice Television Awards	2016	Best Drama Series	Stranger Things	Nominated	
Critics' Choice Television Awards	2016	Most Bingeworthy Show	Stranger Things	Nominated	
Critics' Choice Television Awards	2018	Best Drama Series	Stranger Things	Nominated	
Critics' Choice Television Awards	2018	Best Supporting Actor in a Drama Series	David Harbour	Won	
Directors Guild of America Awards	2017	Outstanding Directorial Achievement for a Drama Series	The Duffer Brothers (for "Chapter One: The Vanishing of Will Byers")	Nominated	
Directors Guild of America Awards	2018	Outstanding Directorial Achievement for a Drama Series	The Duffer Brothers (for "Chapter Nine: The Gate")	Nominated	
Dorian Awards	2016	TV Drama of the Year	Stranger Things	Nominated	
Dorian Awards	2016	TV Performance of the Year — Actress	Winona Ryder	Nominated	
Dragon Awards	2017	Best Science Fiction or Fantasy TV Series	Stranger Things	Won	
Dragon Awards	2022	Best Science Fiction or Fantasy TV Series	Stranger Things	Won	
Empire Awards	2017	Best TV Series	Stranger Things	Nominated	
Empire Awards	2018	Best Actress in a TV Series	Millie Bobby Brown	Nominated	
Empire Awards	2018	Best TV Series	Stranger Things	Nominated	
Fangoria Chainsaw Awards	2017	Best TV Actress	Millie Bobby Brown	Won	
Fangoria Chainsaw Awards	2017	Best TV Series	Stranger Things	Won	
Fangoria Chainsaw Awards	2017	Best TV Supporting Actor	David Harbour	Nominated	
Fangoria Chainsaw Awards	2017	Best TV Supporting Actress	Winona Ryder	Won	
GLAAD Media Awards	2026	Outstanding Drama Series	Stranger Things	Won	
Golden Globe Awards	2017	Best Actress – Television Series Drama	Winona Ryder	Nominated	
Golden Globe Awards	2017	Best Television Series – Drama	Stranger Things	Nominated	
Golden Globe Awards	2018	Best Supporting Actor – Series, Miniseries or Television Film	David Harbour	Nominated	
Golden Globe Awards	2018	Best Television Series – Drama	Stranger Things	Nominated	
Golden Reel Awards	2017	Best Sound Editing: TV Short Form – FX/Foley	Jacob McNaughton (for "Chapter Eight: The Upside Down")	Nominated	
Golden Reel Awards	2017	Best Sound Editing: TV Short Form – Music	David Klotz (for "Chapter Three: Holly Jolly")	Won	
Golden Reel Awards	2018	Best Sound Editing: TV Short Form – Dialogue/ADR	Bradley North and Tiffany Griffith (for "Chapter Eight: The Mind Flayer")	Nominated	
Golden Reel Awards	2018	Best Sound Editing: TV Short Form – FX/Foley	Bradley North, Craig Hennigan, Jordan Wilby, Antony Zeller, Zane D. Bruce, and Lindsay Pepper (for "Chapter Eight: The Mind Flayer")	Nominated	
Golden Reel Awards	2018	Best Sound Editing: TV Short Form – Music	David Klotz (for "Chapter Eight: The Mind Flayer")	Won	
Golden Reel Awards	2020	Outstanding Achievement in Sound Editing – Broadcast Long Form Effects / Foley	Craig Henighan, Will Files, Angelo Palazzo, Katie Halliday, Steven Baine (for "Chapter Eight: The Battle of Starcourt")	Nominated	
Golden Reel Awards	2023	Outstanding Achievement in Sound Editing – Broadcast Long Form Dialogue / ADR	Will Files, Craig Henighan, Ryan Cole, Korey Pereira, Jill Purdy, David Butler, Polly McKinnon, Rob Chen (for "Chapter Seven: The Massacre at Hawkins Lab")	Nominated	
Golden Reel Awards	2023	Outstanding Achievement in Sound Editing – Broadcast Long Form Effects / Foley	Will Files, Craig Henighan, Angelo Palazzo, Ken McGill, Katie Halliday, Lee Gilmore, David Grimaldi, Chris Bonis, Steve Baine (for "Chapter Seven: The Massacre at Hawkins Lab")	Won	
Golden Reel Awards	2023	Outstanding Achievement in Music Editing – Broadcast Long Form	David Klotz, Lena Glikson (for "Chapter Nine: The Piggyback")	Won	
Golden Reel Awards	2026	Outstanding Achievement in Sound Editing – Broadcast Long Form Dialogue / ADR	Craig Henighan, Will Files, Ryan Cole, Polly McKinnon, Korey Pereira, Graham Terry, Emma Present (for "Chapter Four: Sorcerer")	Nominated	
Golden Reel Awards	2026	Outstanding Achievement in Sound Editing – Broadcast Long Form Effects / Foley	Will Files, Craig Henighan, Angelo Palazzo, David Grimaldi, Katie Halliday, Nolan McNaughton, Christopher Bonis, Nicholas Interlandi, Steve Neal, Matt “Smokey” Cloud, Lee Gilmore, Gina Wark, Peter Persaud, Steve Baine (for "Chapter Four: Sorcerer")	Nominated	
Golden Reel Awards	2026	Outstanding Achievement in Music Editing – Broadcast Long Form	David Klotz, Lena Glikson (for "Chapter Four: Sorcerer")	Nominated	
Golden Trailer Awards	2017	Best Fantasy Adventure (TV Spot/Trailer/Teaser for a series)	"Stranger" (Trailer Park, Inc.)	Won	
Golden Trailer Awards	2017	Best Sound Editing (TV Spot/Trailer/Teaser for a series)	"Stranger" (Trailer Park, Inc.)	Nominated	
Golden Trailer Awards	2018	Best Fantasy Adventure (TV Spot/Trailer/Teaser for a series)	"Darkness" (Trailer Park, Inc.)	Won	
Golden Trailer Awards	2018	Best Music (TV Spot / Trailer / Teaser for a series)	"Darkness" (Trailer Park, Inc.)	Won	
Golden Trailer Awards	2018	Best Sound Editing (TV Spot/Trailer/Teaser for a series)	"Darkness" (Trailer Park, Inc.)	Won	
Grammy Awards	2017	Best Score Soundtrack for Visual Media	Stranger Things, Vol. 1	Nominated	
Grammy Awards	2017	Best Score Soundtrack for Visual Media	Stranger Things, Vol. 2	Nominated	
Grammy Awards	2019	Best Compilation Soundtrack For Visual Media	Stranger Things: Music from the Netflix Original Series	Nominated	
Grammy Awards	2023	Best Compilation Soundtrack For Visual Media	Stranger Things 4, Vol. 2	Nominated	
Grammy Awards	2027	Best Compilation Soundtrack for Visual Media	Stranger Things Season 5	Pending	
Guild of Music Supervisors Awards	2017	Best Music Supervision in a Television Drama	Nora Felder	Won	
Guild of Music Supervisors Awards	2018	Best Music Supervision in a Television Promo	Bobby Gumm and Michael Paquette	Won	
Guild of Music Supervisors Awards	2023	Best Music Supervision – Television Drama	Nora Felder	Won	
Guild of Music Supervisors Awards	2023	Best Music Supervision in a Trailer – Series	Bobby Gumm	Nominated	
Guild of Music Supervisors Awards	2026	Best Music Supervision in a Trailer - Series	Bobby Gumm	Nominated	
Hollywood Critics Association TV Awards	2022	Best Streaming Series, Drama	Stranger Things	Nominated	
Hollywood Critics Association TV Awards	2022	Best Actress in a Streaming Series, Drama	Winona Ryder	Nominated	
Hollywood Critics Association TV Awards	2022	Best Supporting Actor in a Streaming Series, Drama	Joe Keery	Nominated	
Hollywood Critics Association TV Awards	2022	Best Supporting Actress in a Streaming Series, Drama	Millie Bobby Brown	Nominated	
Hollywood Critics Association TV Awards	2022	Best Supporting Actress in a Streaming Series, Drama	Maya Hawke	Nominated	
Hollywood Critics Association TV Awards	2022	Best Supporting Actress in a Streaming Series, Drama	Sadie Sink	Won	
Hollywood Critics Association TV Awards	2022	Best Directing in a Streaming Series, Drama	The Duffer Brothers (for "Chapter Seven: The Massacre at Hawkins Lab")	Nominated	
Hollywood Critics Association TV Awards	2022	Best Directing in a Streaming Series, Drama	Shawn Levy (for "Chapter Four: Dear Billy")	Nominated	
Hollywood Critics Association TV Awards	2022	Best Writing in a Streaming Series, Drama	The Duffer Brothers (for "Chapter Seven: The Massacre at Hawkins Lab")	Nominated	
Hollywood Music in Media Awards	2016	Best Main Title – TV Show/Digital Streaming Series	Kyle Dixon and Michael Stein	Nominated	
Hollywood Music in Media Awards	2016	Best Original Score – TV Show/Miniseries	Kyle Dixon and Michael Stein	Nominated	
Hollywood Music in Media Awards	2016	Outstanding Music Supervision – Television	Nora Felder	Won	
Hollywood Post Alliance	2017	Outstanding Editing – Television	Dean Zimmerman (for "Chapter One: The Vanishing of Will Byers")	Won	
Hollywood Post Alliance	2017	Outstanding Sound – Television	Craig Henigham, Joe Barnett, Adam Jenkins, Jordan Wilby, and Tiffany Griffith (for "Chapter Eight: The Upside Down")	Won (Note: Also awarded to American Gods)	
Hugo Awards	2017	Best Dramatic Presentation, Long Form	The Duffer Brothers (for season 1 of Stranger Things)	Nominated	
Hugo Awards	2023	Best Dramatic Presentation, Short Form	Matt Duffer, Ross Duffer, Paul Dichter, and Shawn Levy (for "Chapter Four: Dear Billy")	Nominated	
ICG Publicists Awards	2018	Maxwell Weinberg Publicist Showmanship Television Award	Denise Godoy	Won	
IFMCA Awards	2016	Best Original Score for a Television Series	Kyle Dixon and Michael Stein	Nominated	
IGN Awards	2016	Best New Series	Stranger Things	Nominated	
IGN Awards	2016	Best Streaming Exclusive	Stranger Things	Won	
IGN Awards	2016	Best TV Series	Stranger Things	Nominated	
IGN Awards	2017	Best Action Series	Stranger Things	Won (Note: Also awarded to Game of Thrones)	
IGN Awards	2017	Best Dramatic TV Performance	Millie Bobby Brown	Nominated	
IGN Awards	2017	Best TV Episode	"Chapter Nine: The Gate"	Nominated	
IGN People's Choice Awards	2016	Best New Series	Stranger Things	Nominated	
IGN People's Choice Awards	2016	Best Streaming Exclusive	Stranger Things	Won	
IGN People's Choice Awards	2016	Best TV Series	Stranger Things	Nominated	
IGN People's Choice Awards	2017	Best Action Series	Stranger Things	Nominated	
IGN People's Choice Awards	2017	Best Dramatic TV Performance	Millie Bobby Brown	Won	
IGN People's Choice Awards	2017	Best TV Episode	"Chapter Nine: The Gate"	Nominated	
Kids' Choice Awards	2018	Favorite TV Actress	Millie Bobby Brown	Won	
Kids' Choice Awards	2018	Favorite TV Show	Stranger Things	Won	
Kids' Choice Awards	2019	Favorite Female TV Star	Millie Bobby Brown	Nominated	
Kids' Choice Awards	2019	Favorite Male TV Star	Caleb McLaughlin	Nominated	
Kids' Choice Awards	2019	Favorite TV Drama	Stranger Things	Nominated	
Kids' Choice Awards	2020	Favorite Family TV Show	Stranger Things	Won	
Kids' Choice Awards	2020	Favorite Female TV Star	Millie Bobby Brown	Won	
Kids' Choice Awards	2020	Favorite Male TV Star	Caleb McLaughlin	Nominated	
Kids' Choice Awards	2021	Favorite Family TV Show	Stranger Things	Won	
Kids' Choice Awards	2021	Favorite Female TV Star	Millie Bobby Brown	Won	
Kids' Choice Awards	2021	Favorite Male TV Star	Caleb McLaughlin	Nominated	
Kids' Choice Awards	2021	Favorite Male TV Star	Finn Wolfhard	Nominated	
Kids' Choice Awards	2023	Favorite Family TV Show	Stranger Things	Nominated	
Kids' Choice Awards	2023	Favorite Female TV Star (Family)	Millie Bobby Brown	Nominated	
Kids' Choice Awards	2023	Favorite Female TV Star (Family)	Sadie Sink	Nominated	
Kids' Choice Awards	2023	Favorite Male TV Star (Family)	Gaten Matarazzo	Nominated	
Kids' Choice Awards	2023	Favorite Male TV Star (Family)	Caleb McLaughlin	Nominated	
Kids' Choice Awards	2023	Favorite Male TV Star (Family)	Finn Wolfhard	Won	
Kids' Choice Awards	2026	Favorite Family TV Show	Stranger Things	Won	
Kids' Choice Awards	2026	Favorite Female TV Star (Family)	Millie Bobby Brown	Nominated	
Kids' Choice Awards	2026	Favorite Female TV Star (Family)	Sadie Sink	Nominated	
Kids' Choice Awards	2026	Favorite Male TV Star (Family)	David Harbour	Nominated	
Kids' Choice Awards	2026	Favorite Male TV Star (Family)	Finn Wolfhard	Nominated	
Kids' Choice Awards	2026	Favorite Male TV Star (Family)	Joe Keery	Won	
Kids' Choice Awards	2026	Favorite On-Screen Duo/Trio	Gaten Matarazzo and Joe Keery	Nominated	
Location Managers Guild Awards	2017	Outstanding Locations in Period Television	Tony Holley	Nominated	
Location Managers Guild Awards	2018	Outstanding Locations in Period Television	Tony Holley and Kyle Carey	Nominated	
Location Managers Guild Awards	2022	Outstanding Locations in Period Television	Tony Holley, Kyle A. Carey, John Lucas, Jonas Spokas, Vytautas Riabovas	Won	
Makeup Artist and Hair Stylist Guild Awards	2017	Best Period and/or Character Hair Styling – Television	Sarah Hindsgaul and Evelyn Roach	Nominated	
Makeup Artist and Hair Stylist Guild Awards	2017	Best Period and/or Character Makeup – Television	Amy L. Forsythe and Samantha Smith	Nominated	
Makeup Artist and Hair Stylist Guild Awards	2018	Best Period and/or Character Hair Styling – Television	Amy L. Forsythe and Jillian Erickson	Nominated	
Makeup Artist and Hair Stylist Guild Awards	2018	Best Period and/or Character Makeup – Television	Amy L. Forsythe and Jillian Erickson	Nominated	
Makeup Artist and Hair Stylist Guild Awards	2023	Best Period and/or Character Makeup – Television	Devin Morales, Lisa Poe, Nataleigh Verrengia	Nominated	
Makeup Artist and Hair Stylist Guild Awards	2023	Best Special Effects Makeup - Television	Barrie Gower, Duncan Jarman, Patt Foad, Paula Eden	Nominated	
Makeup Artist and Hair Stylist Guild Awards	2026	Best Period and/or Character Makeup – Television	Eryn Krueger Mekash, Devin Morales, Mike Mekash, Jessica Gambardella, Benji Dove	Nominated	
Makeup Artist and Hair Stylist Guild Awards	2026	Best Period and/or Character Hair Styling	Sarah Hindsgaul, Katrina Suhre, Brynn Berg, Dena Gibson, Lanzel Smith Jr	Nominated	
Makeup Artist and Hair Stylist Guild Awards	2026	Best Special Effects Makeup	Barrie Gower, Mike Mekash, Duncan Jarman	Won	
MTV Millennial Awards	2017	TV series of the year	Stranger Things	Won	
MTV Movie & TV Awards	2017	Best Actor in a Show	Millie Bobby Brown	Won	
MTV Movie & TV Awards	2017	Best Hero	Millie Bobby Brown	Nominated	
MTV Movie & TV Awards	2017	Best Villain	Demogorgon	Nominated	
MTV Movie & TV Awards	2017	Show of the Year	Stranger Things	Won	
MTV Movie & TV Awards	2018	Best Kiss	Finn Wolfhard and Millie Bobby Brown	Nominated	
MTV Movie & TV Awards	2018	Best Musical Moment	Stranger Things (For Mike and Eleven dance to "Every Breath You Take")	Won	
MTV Movie & TV Awards	2018	Best On-Screen Team	Gaten Matarazzo, Finn Wolfhard, Caleb McLaughlin, Noah Schnapp, Sadie Sink	Nominated	
MTV Movie & TV Awards	2018	Best Performance in a Show	Millie Bobby Brown	Won	
MTV Movie & TV Awards	2018	Best Show	Stranger Things	Won	
MTV Movie & TV Awards	2018	Most Frightened Performance	Noah Schnapp	Won	
MTV Movie & TV Awards	2018	Scene Stealer	Dacre Montgomery	Nominated	
MTV Movie & TV Awards	2023	Best Show	Stranger Things	Nominated	
MTV Movie & TV Awards	2023	Best Performance in a Show	Sadie Sink	Nominated	
MTV Movie & TV Awards	2023	Best Villain	Jamie Campbell Bower	Nominated	
MTV Movie & TV Awards	2023	Best Fight	Jamie Campbell Bower vs. Millie Bobby Brown	Nominated	
MTV Movie & TV Awards	2023	Best Breakthrough Performance	Joseph Quinn	Won	
MTV Movie & TV Awards	2023	Best Kick-Ass Cast	Stranger Things	Won	
MTV Movie & TV Awards	2023	Best Musical Moment	"Running Up That Hill"	Nominated	
NAACP Image Awards	2018	Outstanding Performance by a Youth (Series, Special, Television Movie or Limited Series)	Caleb McLaughlin	Won	
NAACP Image Awards	2023	NAACP Image Award for Outstanding Supporting Actor in a Drama Series	Caleb McLaughlin	Nominated	
National Television Awards	2017	Best Period Drama	Stranger Things	Nominated	
NME Awards	2017	Best TV Series	Stranger Things	Nominated	
NME Awards	2018	Best TV Series	Stranger Things	Won	
Peabody Awards	2017	Best Entertainment Program	Stranger Things	Nominated	
Peabody Awards	2019	Best Entertainment Program	Stranger Things	Won	
People's Choice Awards	2017	Favorite Premium Sci-Fi/Fantasy Series	Stranger Things	Nominated	
People's Choice Awards	2017	Favorite Sci-Fi/Fantasy TV Actress	Millie Bobby Brown	Nominated	
People's Choice Awards	2017	Favorite TV Show	Stranger Things	Nominated	
People's Choice Awards	2019	Bingeworthy Show of 2019	Stranger Things	Nominated	
People's Choice Awards	2019	Drama Show of 2019	Stranger Things	Won	
People's Choice Awards	2019	Drama TV Star of 2019	Millie Bobby Brown	Nominated	
People's Choice Awards	2019	Female TV Star of 2019	Millie Bobby Brown	Won	
People's Choice Awards	2019	Male TV Star of 2019	Finn Wolfhard	Nominated	
People's Choice Awards	2019	Sci-Fi/Fantasy Show of 2019	Stranger Things	Nominated	
People's Choice Awards	2019	Show of 2019	Stranger Things	Won	
People's Choice Awards	2022	Female TV Star of 2022	Millie Bobby Brown	Nominated	
People's Choice Awards	2022	Male TV Star of 2022	Noah Schnapp	Won	
People's Choice Awards	2022	Sci-Fi/Fantasy Show of 2022	Stranger Things	Won	
People's Choice Awards	2022	Show of 2022	Stranger Things	Won	
Primetime Creative Arts Emmy Awards	2017	Outstanding Casting for a Drama Series	Carmen Cuba, Tara Feldstein, and Chase Paris	Won	
Primetime Creative Arts Emmy Awards	2017	Outstanding Cinematography for a Single-Camera Series (One Hour)	Tim Ives (for "Chapter Eight: The Upside Down")	Nominated	
Primetime Creative Arts Emmy Awards	2017	Outstanding Creative Achievement in Interactive Media within a Scripted Program	Stranger Things VR Experience	Nominated	
Primetime Creative Arts Emmy Awards	2017	Outstanding Guest Actress in a Drama Series	Shannon Purser (for "Chapter Three: Holly, Jolly")	Nominated	
Primetime Creative Arts Emmy Awards	2017	Outstanding Hairstyling for a Single-Camera Series	Sarah Hindsgaul and Evelyn Roach (for "Chapter Two: The Weirdo on Maple Street")	Nominated	
Primetime Creative Arts Emmy Awards	2017	Outstanding Main Title Design	Michelle Dougherty, Peter Frankfurt, Arisu Kashiwagi, and Eric Demeusy	Won	
Primetime Creative Arts Emmy Awards	2017	Outstanding Makeup for a Single-Camera Series (Non-Prosthetic)	Myke Michaels and Teresa Vest (for "Chapter Six: The Monster")	Nominated	
Primetime Creative Arts Emmy Awards	2017	Outstanding Music Supervision	Nora Felder (for "Chapter Two: The Weirdo on Maple Street")	Nominated	
Primetime Creative Arts Emmy Awards	2017	Outstanding Original Main Title Theme Music	Michael Stein and Kyle Dixon	Won	
Primetime Creative Arts Emmy Awards	2017	Outstanding Production Design for a Narrative Period Program (One Hour or More)	Chris Trujillo, William Davis, and Jess Royal (for "Chapter One: The Vanishing of Will Byers")	Nominated	
Primetime Creative Arts Emmy Awards	2017	Outstanding Single-Camera Picture Editing for a Drama Series	Dean Zimmerman (for "Chapter One: The Vanishing of Will Byers")	Won	
Primetime Creative Arts Emmy Awards	2017	Outstanding Single-Camera Picture Editing for a Drama Series	Kevin D. Ross (for "Chapter Seven: The Bathtub")	Nominated	
Primetime Creative Arts Emmy Awards	2017	Outstanding Sound Editing for a Series	Bradley North, Craig Henighan, Jordan Wilby, Jonathan Golodner, Tiffany S. Griffth, Sam Munoz, David Klotz, Noel Vought, and Ginger Geary (for "Chapter Eight: The Upside Down")	Won	
Primetime Creative Arts Emmy Awards	2017	Outstanding Sound Mixing for a Comedy or Drama Series (One Hour)	Joe Barnett, Adam Jenkins, Chris Durfy, and Bill Higley (for "Chapter Eight: The Upside Down")	Nominated	
Primetime Creative Arts Emmy Awards	2018	Outstanding Casting for a Drama Series	Carmen Cuba, Tara Feldstein, and Chase Paris	Nominated	
Primetime Creative Arts Emmy Awards	2018	Outstanding Cinematography for a Single-Camera Series (One Hour)	Tim Ives (for "Chapter One: MADMAX")	Nominated	
Primetime Creative Arts Emmy Awards	2018	Outstanding Music Supervision	Nora Felder (for "Chapter Two: Trick or Treat, Freak")	Nominated	
Primetime Creative Arts Emmy Awards	2018	Outstanding Single-Camera Picture Editing for a Drama Series	Kevin D. Ross (for "Chapter Nine: The Gate")	Nominated	
Primetime Creative Arts Emmy Awards	2018	Outstanding Sound Editing for a Comedy or Drama Series (One Hour)	Bradley North, Craig Henighan, Tiffany S. Griffith, Jordan B. Wilby, David Werntz, Antony Zeller, David Klotz, Zane Bruce, and Lindsay Pepper (for "Chapter Eight: The Mind Flayer")	Won	
Primetime Creative Arts Emmy Awards	2018	Outstanding Sound Mixing for a Comedy or Drama Series (One Hour)	Joe Barnett, Adam Jenkins, Michael P. Clark, and Bill Higley (for "Chapter Eight: The Mind Flayer")	Nominated	
Primetime Creative Arts Emmy Awards	2018	Outstanding Special Visual Effects	Paul Graff, Christina Graff, Michael Maher, Fred Raimondi, Seth Hill, Joel Sevilla, Alex Young, Steven Michael Dinozzi, and Caius Man (for "Chapter Nine: The Gate")	Nominated	
Primetime Creative Arts Emmy Awards	2020	Outstanding Interactive Extension of a Linear Program	Scoops Ahoy: Operation Scoop Snoop	Nominated	
Primetime Creative Arts Emmy Awards	2020	Outstanding Music Supervision	Nora Felder (for "Chapter Three: The Case of the Missing Lifeguard")	Nominated	
Primetime Creative Arts Emmy Awards	2020	Outstanding Single-Camera Picture Editing for a Drama Series	Dean Zimmerman and Kathryn Naranjo (for "The Battle of Starcourt")	Nominated	
Primetime Creative Arts Emmy Awards	2020	Outstanding Sound Editing for a Comedy or Drama Series (One Hour)	Craig Henighan, William Files, Ryan Cole, Kerry Dean Williams, Angelo Palazzo, Katie Halliday, David Klotz, and Steve Baine (for "The Battle of Starcourt")	Won	
Primetime Creative Arts Emmy Awards	2020	Outstanding Sound Mixing for a Comedy or Drama Series (One Hour)	Michael Rayle, Mark Paterson, William Files, and Craig Henighan (for "The Battle of Starcourt")	Nominated	
Primetime Creative Arts Emmy Awards	2020	Outstanding Special Visual Effects	Paul Graff, Gayle Busby, Tom Ford, Michael Maher Jr., Martin Pelletier, Berter Orpak, Yvon Jardel, Nathan Arbuckle, and Caius Man (for "The Battle of Starcourt")	Nominated	
Primetime Creative Arts Emmy Awards	2020	Outstanding Stunt Coordination for a Drama Series, Limited Series or Movie	Hiro Koda	Nominated	
Primetime Creative Arts Emmy Awards	2022	Outstanding Casting for a Drama Series	Carmen Cuba, Tara Feldstein, and Chase Paris	Nominated	
Primetime Creative Arts Emmy Awards	2022	Outstanding Music Supervision	Nora Felder (for "Chapter Four: Dear Billy")	Won	
Primetime Creative Arts Emmy Awards	2022	Outstanding Period and/or Character Hairstyling	Sarah Hindsgaul, Katrina Suhre, Brynn Berg, Dena Gibson, Jamie Freeman, Tariq Furgerson, Chase Heard, and Charles Grico (for "Chapter Seven: The Massacre at Hawkins Lab")	Nominated	
Primetime Creative Arts Emmy Awards	2022	Outstanding Period and/or Character Makeup (Non-Prosthetic)	Amy L. Forsythe, Devin Morales, Leo Satkovitch, Nataleigh Verrengia, Rocco Gaglioti, Lisa Poe, Benji Dove, and Jan Rooney (for "Chapter Two: Vecna's Curse")	Nominated	
Primetime Creative Arts Emmy Awards	2022	Outstanding Production Design for a Narrative Period Program (One Hour or More)	Chris Trujillo, Sean Brennan and Jess Royal (for "Chapter Seven: The Massacre at Hawkins Lab")	Nominated	
Primetime Creative Arts Emmy Awards	2022	Outstanding Prosthetic Makeup	Barrie Gower, Duncan Jarman, Mike Mekash, Eric Garcia, and Nix Herrera (for "Chapter Four: Dear Billy")	Won	
Primetime Creative Arts Emmy Awards	2022	Outstanding Single-Camera Picture Editing for a Drama Series	Dean Zimmerman and Casey Cichocki (for "Chapter Four: Dear Billy")	Nominated	
Primetime Creative Arts Emmy Awards	2022	Outstanding Sound Editing for a Comedy or Drama Series (One Hour)	Craig Henighan, William Files, Ryan Cole, Korey Pereira, Angelo Palazzo, Katie Halliday, Ken McGill, Steven Baine, David Klotz, and Lena Glikson-Nezhelskaya (for "Chapter Seven: The Massacre at Hawkins Lab")	Won	
Primetime Creative Arts Emmy Awards	2022	Outstanding Sound Mixing for a Comedy or Drama Series (One Hour)	William Files, Mark Paterson, Craig Henighan, and Michael P. Clark for ("Chapter Seven: The Massacre at Hawkins Lab")	Won	
Primetime Creative Arts Emmy Awards	2022	Outstanding Special Visual Effects in a Season or a Movie	Michael Maher Jr., Marion Spates, Jabbar Raisani, Terron Pratt, Ashley J. Ward, Julien Hery, Niklas Jacobson, Manolo Mantero, and Neil Eskuri	Nominated	
Primetime Creative Arts Emmy Awards	2022	Outstanding Stunt Coordination for a Drama Series, Limited Series or Movie	Hiro Koda	Won	
Primetime Creative Arts Emmy Awards	2022	Outstanding Stunt Performance	Matthew Scheib and Jura Yury Kruze (for "Chapter Four: Dear Billy")	Nominated	
Primetime Creative Arts Emmy Awards	2023	Outstanding Music Supervision	Nora Felder (for "Chapter Nine: The Piggyback")	Nominated	
Primetime Creative Arts Emmy Awards	2023	Outstanding Period and/or Character Makeup (Non-Prosthetic)	Amy L. Forsythe, Devin Morales, Erin Keith, Nataleigh Verrengia, Benji Dove, Jan Rooney, Lisa Poe, and Rocco Gaglioti Jr. (for "Chapter Nine: The Piggyback")	Nominated	
Primetime Creative Arts Emmy Awards	2023	Outstanding Sound Editing for a Comedy or Drama Series (One Hour)	Craig Henighan, William Files, Jill Purdy, Lee Gilmore, Ryan Cole, Korey Pereira, Angelo Palazzo, Katie Halliday, David Klotz, Lena Glikson-Nezhelskaya, Ken McGill, and Steve Baine (for "Chapter Nine: The Piggyback")	Nominated	
Primetime Creative Arts Emmy Awards	2023	Outstanding Sound Mixing for a Comedy or Drama Series (One Hour)	Craig Henighan, William Files, Mark Paterson, and Michael P. Clark (for "Chapter Nine: The Piggyback")	Nominated	
Primetime Creative Arts Emmy Awards	2023	Outstanding Stunt Performance	Jahnel Curfman, Niko Dalman, and Shannon Beshears (for "Chapter Nine: The Piggyback")	Nominated	
Primetime Creative Arts Emmy Awards	2023	Outstanding Stunt Performance	Courtney Schwartz and Michelle Andrea Adams (for "Chapter Nine: The Piggyback")	Nominated	
Primetime Creative Arts Emmy Awards	2026	Outstanding Production Design for a Narrative Period or Fantasy Program (One Hour or More)	Chris Trujillo, Sean Brennan, and Jess Royal (for "Chapter Four: Sorcerer")	Nominated	
Primetime Creative Arts Emmy Awards	2026	Outstanding Prosthetic Makeup	Barrie Gower, Duncan Jarman, Michael Mekash, and Emma Faulkes (for "Chapter Four: Sorcerer")	Nominated	
Primetime Creative Arts Emmy Awards	2026	Outstanding Music Supervision	Nora Felder (for "Chapter Eight: The Rightside Up")	Nominated	
Primetime Creative Arts Emmy Awards	2026	Outstanding Sound Editing for a Comedy or Drama Series (One Hour)	Craig Henighan, William Files, Dave Grimaldi, Lee Gilmore, Ryan Cole, Polly McKinnon, Emma Present, Angelo Palazzo, Kate Halliday, Christopher Bonis, Nick Interlandi, Matt "Smokey" Cloud, Gina Wark, Lena Glikson, David Klotz, and Steve Baine (for "Chapter Eight: The Rightside Up")	Nominated	
Primetime Creative Arts Emmy Awards	2026	Outstanding Sound Mixing for a Comedy or Drama Series (One Hour)	Mark Paterson, William Files, Steve Neal, Michael P. Clark, Hector Carlos Ramirez, and Peter Persaud (for "Chapter Eight: The Rightside Up")	Nominated	
Primetime Creative Arts Emmy Awards	2026	Outstanding Special Visual Effects in a Season or a Movie	Betsy Paterson, Michael Maher Jr., Sean Ames, Craig Seitz, Tessa Roehl, Chloe Lipp, Brad Tobler, Martin Hill, Richard Thwaites, Bill Georgiou, Jessica Smith, and Mark Hawker	Won	
Primetime Creative Arts Emmy Awards	2026	Outstanding Stunt Coordination for Drama Programming	Hiro Koda and Jahnel Curfman	Nominated	
Primetime Emmy Awards	2017	Outstanding Directing for a Drama Series	The Duffer Brothers (for "Chapter One: The Vanishing of Will Byers")	Nominated	
Primetime Emmy Awards	2017	Outstanding Drama Series	The Duffer Brothers, Dan Cohen, Shawn Levy, and Iain Paterson	Nominated	
Primetime Emmy Awards	2017	Outstanding Supporting Actor in a Drama Series	David Harbour (for "Chapter Eight: The Upside Down")	Nominated	
Primetime Emmy Awards	2017	Outstanding Supporting Actress in a Drama Series	Millie Bobby Brown (for "Chapter Seven: The Bathtub")	Nominated	
Primetime Emmy Awards	2017	Outstanding Writing for a Drama Series	The Duffer Brothers (for "Chapter One: The Vanishing of Will Byers")	Nominated	
Primetime Emmy Awards	2018	Outstanding Directing for a Drama Series	The Duffer Brothers (for "Chapter Nine: The Gate")	Nominated	
Primetime Emmy Awards	2018	Outstanding Drama Series	The Duffer Brothers, Dan Cohen, Shawn Levy, Iain Paterson, Rand Geiger, and Justin Doble	Nominated	
Primetime Emmy Awards	2018	Outstanding Supporting Actor in a Drama Series	David Harbour (for "Chapter Four: Will the Wise")	Nominated	
Primetime Emmy Awards	2018	Outstanding Supporting Actress in a Drama Series	Millie Bobby Brown (for "Chapter Three: The Pollywog")	Nominated	
Primetime Emmy Awards	2018	Outstanding Writing for a Drama Series	The Duffer Brothers (for "Chapter Nine: The Gate")	Nominated	
Primetime Emmy Awards	2020	Outstanding Drama Series	The Duffer Brothers, Dan Cohen, Shawn Levy, Iain Paterson, Rand Geiger, and Justin Doble	Nominated	
Primetime Emmy Awards	2022	Outstanding Drama Series	The Duffer Brothers, Dan Cohen, Shawn Levy, Iain Paterson, Rand Geiger, and Justin Doble	Nominated	
Producers Guild of America Awards	2016	Norman Felton Award for Outstanding Producer of Episodic Television, Drama	The Duffer Brothers, Shawn Levy, Dan Cohen, and Iain Paterson	Won	
Producers Guild of America Awards	2017	Norman Felton Award for Outstanding Producer of Episodic Television, Drama	Iain Paterson, Shawn Levy, Dan Cohen, the Duffer Brothers, Rand Geiger, and Justin Doble	Nominated	
Satellite Awards	2017	Best Actress – Television Series Drama	Winona Ryder	Nominated	
Satellite Awards	2017	Best Television Series – Genre	Stranger Things	Nominated	
Satellite Awards	2018	Best Television Series – Genre	Stranger Things	Nominated	
Satellite Awards	2020	Best Genre Series	Stranger Things	Won	
Saturn Awards	2017	Best Actress on a Television Series	Winona Ryder	Nominated	
Saturn Awards	2017	Best New Media Television Series	Stranger Things	Won (Note: Also awarded to Marvel's Luke Cage)	
Saturn Awards	2017	Best Younger Actor on a Television Series	Millie Bobby Brown	Won	
Saturn Awards	2018	Best New Media Television Series	Stranger Things	Nominated	
Saturn Awards	2018	Best Younger Actor on a Television Series	Millie Bobby Brown	Nominated	
Saturn Awards	2019	Best Streaming Horror & Thriller Series	Stranger Things	Won	
Saturn Awards	2019	Best Supporting Actress in a Streaming Presentation	Maya Hawke	Won	
Saturn Awards	2022	Best Streaming Horror & Thriller Series	Stranger Things	Won	
Saturn Awards	2022	Best Actress in a Streaming Series	Millie Bobby Brown	Nominated	
Saturn Awards	2022	Best Supporting Actor in a Streaming Series	Joseph Quinn	Nominated	
Saturn Awards	2022	Best Performance by a Younger Actor in a Streaming Series	Gaten Matarazzo	Nominated	
Saturn Awards	2022	Best Performance by a Younger Actor in a Streaming Series	Sadie Sink	Nominated	
Saturn Awards	2022	Best Guest Performance in a Streaming Series	Robert Englund	Nominated	
Saturn Awards	2026	Best Fantasy Television Series	Stranger Things	Nominated	
Saturn Awards	2026	Best Actress in a Television Series	Millie Bobby Brown	Nominated	
Saturn Awards	2026	Best Young Performer in a Television Series	Noah Schnapp	Nominated	
Saturn Awards	2026	Best Young Performer in a Television Series	Sadie Sink	Nominated	
Saturn Awards	2026	Best Guest Star in a Television Series	Linda Hamilton	Nominated	
Screen Actors Guild Awards	2017	Outstanding Performance by an Ensemble in a Drama Series	Millie Bobby Brown, Cara Buono, Joe Chrest, Natalia Dyer, David Harbour, Charlie Heaton, Joe Keery, Gaten Matarazzo, Caleb McLaughlin, Matthew Modine, Rob Morgan, John Paul Reynolds, Winona Ryder, Noah Schnapp, Mark Steger, and Finn Wolfhard	Won	
Screen Actors Guild Awards	2017	Outstanding Performance by a Female Actor in a Drama Series	Millie Bobby Brown	Nominated	
Screen Actors Guild Awards	2017	Outstanding Performance by a Female Actor in a Drama Series	Winona Ryder	Nominated	
Screen Actors Guild Awards	2018	Outstanding Performance by an Ensemble in a Drama Series	Sean Astin, Millie Bobby Brown, Cara Buono, Joe Chrest, Catherine Curtin, Natalia Dyer, David Harbour, Charlie Heaton, Joe Keery, Gaten Matarazzo, Caleb McLaughlin, Dacre Montgomery, Paul Reiser, Winona Ryder, Noah Schnapp, Sadie Sink, and Finn Wolfhard	Nominated	
Screen Actors Guild Awards	2018	Outstanding Performance by a Female Actor in a Drama Series	Millie Bobby Brown	Nominated	
Screen Actors Guild Awards	2018	Outstanding Performance by a Male Actor in a Drama Series	David Harbour	Nominated	
Screen Actors Guild Awards	2018	Outstanding Performance by a Stunt Ensemble in a Television Series	Max Calder, Crystal Hooks, Kathryn Howard, Cal Johnson, Jason Kehler, Jo Jo Lambert, Anderson Martin, and Lonnie R. Smith Jr	Nominated	
Screen Actors Guild Awards	2020	Outstanding Performance by an Ensemble in a Drama Series	Millie Bobby Brown, Cara Buono, Jake Busey, Natalia Dyer, Cary Elwes, Priah Ferguson, Brett Gelman, David Harbour, Maya Hawke, Charlie Heaton, Andrey Ivchenko, Joe Keery, Gaten Matarazzo, Caleb McLaughlin, Dacre Montgomery, Michael Park, Francesca Reale, Winona Ryder, Noah Schnapp, Sadie Sink, and Finn Wolfhard	Nominated	
Screen Actors Guild Awards	2020	Outstanding Performance by a Male Actor in a Drama Series	David Harbour	Nominated	
Screen Actors Guild Awards	2020	Outstanding Performance by a Stunt Ensemble in a Television Series	Stranger Things	Nominated	
Screen Actors Guild Awards	2023	Outstanding Performance by a Stunt Ensemble in a Television Series	Stranger Things	Won	
Screen Actors Guild Awards	2026	Outstanding Performance by a Stunt Ensemble in a Television Series	Stranger Things	Nominated	
Set Decorators Society of America Awards	2022	Best Achievement in Décor/Design of a One Hour Fantasy or Science Fiction Series	Jess Royal and Chris Trujillo	Won	
Shorty Awards	2017	Best TV Show	Stranger Things	Nominated	
Society of Camera Operators Awards	2017	Camera Operator of the Year – Television	Bob Gorelick	Nominated	
Society of Camera Operators Awards	2018	Camera Operator of the Year – Television	Bob Gorelick	Won	
TCA Awards	2017	Outstanding Achievement in Drama	Stranger Things	Nominated	
TCA Awards	2017	Outstanding New Program	Stranger Things	Nominated	
TCA Awards	2017	Program of the Year	Stranger Things	Nominated	
Teen Choice Awards	2017	Choice Breakout Series	Stranger Things	Nominated	
Teen Choice Awards	2017	Choice Breakout TV Star	Millie Bobby Brown	Nominated	
Teen Choice Awards	2017	Choice Breakout TV Star	Finn Wolfhard	Nominated	
Teen Choice Awards	2017	Choice Fantasy/Sci-Fi Series	Stranger Things	Nominated	
Teen Choice Awards	2018	Choice Hissy Fit	Joe Keery	Nominated	
Teen Choice Awards	2018	Choice Liplock	Millie Bobby Brown and Finn Wolfhard	Nominated	
Teen Choice Awards	2018	Choice Scene Stealer	Charlie Heaton	Nominated	
Teen Choice Awards	2018	Choice Sci-Fi/Fantasy TV Actor	Gaten Matarazzo	Nominated	
Teen Choice Awards	2018	Choice Sci-Fi/Fantasy TV Actor	Finn Wolfhard	Nominated	
Teen Choice Awards	2018	Choice Sci-Fi/Fantasy TV Actress	Millie Bobby Brown	Won	
Teen Choice Awards	2018	Choice Sci-Fi/Fantasy TV Show	Stranger Things	Nominated	
Teen Choice Awards	2018	Choice TV Ship	Finn Wolfhard and Millie Bobby Brown	Nominated	
Teen Choice Awards	2018	Choice TV Villain	Mind Flayer	Nominated	
Teen Choice Awards	2019	Choice Summer TV Actor	Gaten Matarazzo	Nominated	
Teen Choice Awards	2019	Choice Summer TV Actor	Caleb McLaughlin	Nominated	
Teen Choice Awards	2019	Choice Summer TV Actor	Noah Schnapp	Won	
Teen Choice Awards	2019	Choice Summer TV Actor	Finn Wolfhard	Nominated	
Teen Choice Awards	2019	Choice Summer TV Actress	Millie Bobby Brown	Won	
Teen Choice Awards	2019	Choice Summer TV Show	Stranger Things	Won	
Visual Effects Society Awards	2017	Outstanding Visual Effects in a Photoreal Episode	Marc Kolbe, Aaron Sims, and Olcun Tan (for "Demogorgon")	Nominated	
Visual Effects Society Awards	2018	Outstanding Created Environment in an Episode, Commercial, or Real-Time Project	Saul Galbiati, Michael Maher, Seth Cobb, and Kate McFadden (for "Chapter Nine: The Gate")	Nominated	
Visual Effects Society Awards	2018	Outstanding Visual Effects in a Photoreal Episode	Paul Graff, Christina Graff, Seth Hill, Joel Sevilla, and Caius the Man (for "Chapter Nine: The Gate")	Nominated	
Visual Effects Society Awards	2020	Outstanding Animated Character in an Episode or Real-Time Project	Joseph Dubé-Arsenault, Antoine Barthod, Frederick Gagnon, and Xavier Lafarge (for "Tom/Bruce Monster")	Won	
Visual Effects Society Awards	2020	Outstanding Compositing in an Episode	Simon Lehembre, Andrew Kowbell, Karim El-Masry, and Miklos Mesterhazy (for "Starcourt Mall Battle")	Nominated	
Visual Effects Society Awards	2020	Outstanding Effects Simulations in an Episode, Commercial, or Real-Time Project	Nathan Arbuckle, Christian Gaumond, James Dong, and Aleksander Starkov (for "Melting Tom/Bruce")	Won	
Visual Effects Society Awards	2020	Outstanding Visual Effects in a Photoreal Episode	Paul Graff, Tom Ford, Michael Maher Jr., Martin Pelletier, and Andy Sowers (for "Chapter Six: E Pluribus Unum")	Nominated	
Visual Effects Society Awards	2023	Outstanding Visual Effects in a Photoreal Episode	Jabbar Raisani, Terron Pratt, Niklas Jacobson, Justin Mitchell, and Richard E. Perry (for "The Piggyback")	Nominated	
Visual Effects Society Awards	2023	Outstanding Effects Simulations in an Episode, Commercial, or Real-Time Project	Ahmad Ghourab, Gavin Templer, Rachel Ajorque, and Eri Ohno (for "Hawkins Destructive Fissures")	Nominated	
Visual Effects Society Awards	2026	Outstanding Visual Effects in a Photoreal Episode	Betsy Paterson, Tessa Roehl, Michael Maher Jr., Martin Hill (for "Chapter Eight: The Rightside Up")	Nominated	
Visual Effects Society Awards	2026	Outstanding Character in an Episodic, Commercial, Game Cinematic, or Real-Time Project	James Moore, Layne Howe, Shawn Warawa, Yoshihiro Harimoto (for "Chapter Eight: The Rightside Up; Mindflayer")	Nominated	
Visual Effects Society Awards	2026	Outstanding Effects Simulations in an Episode, Commercial, Game Cinematic or Real-Time Project	Michael Chrobak, Brandon James Fleet, Yasunobu Arahori, Hoi Ying Fung (for "Chapter Eight: The Rightside Up; Assault on the Mindflayer")	Nominated	
Visual Effects Society Awards	2026	Outstanding Compositing and Lighting in an Episode	Ben Roberts, Rachel E. Herbert, Don Bradford, Ken Lam (for "Chapter Eight: The Rightside Up; The Abyss and Vecna’s Face")	Nominated	
World Soundtrack Awards	2017	Best TV Composer of the Year	Kyle Dixon and Michael Stein	Nominated	
Writers Guild of America Awards	2016	New Series	Paul Dichter, Justin Doble, the Duffer Brothers, Karl Gajdusek, Jessica Mecklenburg, Jessie Nickson-Lopez, and Alison Tatlock	Nominated	
Writers Guild of America Awards	2016	Television Drama Series	Paul Dichter, Justin Doble, the Duffer Brothers, Karl Gajdusek, Jessica Mecklenburg, Jessie Nickson-Lopez, and Alison Tatlock	Nominated	
Writers Guild of America Awards	2017	Television Drama Series	Paul Dichter, Justin Doble, the Duffer Brothers, Jessie Nickson-Lopez, and Kate Trefry	Nominated	
Young Artist Awards	2017	Best Performance in a Digital TV Series or Film – Teen Actor	Gaten Matarazzo	Nominated	
Young Artist Awards	2017	Best Performance in a Digital TV Series or Film – Teen Actor	Caleb McLaughlin	Nominated	
Young Artist Awards	2017	Best Performance in a Digital TV Series or Film – Teen Actor	Finn Wolfhard	Nominated	
Young Artist Awards	2017	Best Performance in a Digital TV Series or Film – Teen Actress	Natalia Dyer	Nominated	
Young Artist Awards	2017	Best Performance in a Digital TV Series or Film – Young Actor	Noah Schnapp	Nominated	
Young Artist Awards	2017	Best Performance in a Digital TV Series or Film – Young Actress	Millie Bobby Brown	Nominated	
