= Restless (Starpoint album) =

Studio album by Starpoint
- Released: August 6, 1985
- Recorded: 1984–1985
- Studio: Unique Recording, New York City; Sigma Sound, Philadelphia, Pennsylvania
- Genre: Soul, funk, dance
- Length: 36:24
- Label: Elektra, Asylum
- Producer: Keith Diamond & Lionel Job

Starpoint chronology
It's All Yours (1984)	Restless (1985)	Sensational (1987)

Professional ratings
Review scores
Source	Rating
AllMusic	3/5 stars

Restless is the seventh full-length studio release from Maryland-based soul band Starpoint. It was released in 1985 and was produced by the team of Keith Diamond and Lionel Job (Diamond is also credited for writing two and co-writing four more of the eight selections here). It featured their biggest pop chart hit in the song "Object of My Desire", which peaked at number 25 in 1985. Follow-up singles included "What You Been Missin'", which cracked the R&B top ten, and the title track, which nearly became another R&B top-ten hit.

== Additional information ==
Signing with Elektra in the early/mid-1980s, Starpoint veered more toward the pop side of R&B, while still maintaining the funk elements that originally characterized their sound. Their 1985 LP Restless yielded their sole top 40 pop single, "Object of My Desire", and the R&B/Urban singles "Restless" and "What You've Been Missin'". The non-single tracks (as always) were just as strong, with "Emotions" and "One More Night" being the standouts, in addition to a song that had a lot of pop potential, "See the Light".

== Track listing ==
1. "Object of My Desire" (Kayode Adeyemo, Ernesto Phillips, Keith Diamond) – 5:00
2. "One More Night" (Diamond, E. Phillips, Lionel Job) – 4:05
3. "Emotions" (Orlando Phillips) – 4:27
4. "See the Light" (Diamond) – 4:20
5. "Till the End of Time" (Diamond) – 5:05
6. "Don't Take Your Love Away" (E. Phillips) – 4:14
7. "Restless" (Diamond, E. Phillips) – 3:49
8. "What You Been Missin'" (Diamond, Jolyon Skinner) – 5:10

== Personnel ==
=== Starpoint ===
- Renée Diggs: female vocals
- Kayode Adeyemo: male vocals
- George Phillips: keyboards, backing vocals
- Ernesto Phillips: guitars, keyboards, backing vocals
- Orlando Phillips: bass, saxophone, keyboards, backing vocals
- Gregory Phillips: drums, percussion, backing vocals

=== Additional personnel ===
- Keith Diamond: Fairlight and synthesizer programming, keyboards, backing vocals
- Ned Liben (aka EBN): additional Fairlight programming
- Lionel Job, Bashiri Johnson: additional percussion
- Jeff Smith: saxophone on "One More Night"
- Cindy Mizelle: backing vocals on "One More Night"
- James Woodley: backing vocals on "See the Light"
- Barry Eastmond: keyboards on "Til the End of Time"
- Terry Silverlight: drums, percussion

=== Production ===
- Produced by Keith Diamond (for Rough Cut Productions, Inc.) and Lionel Job (for Lionel Job, Inc.)
- Recording engineers: Bob Rosa & Tom Lord-Alge; assisted by Jim Dougherty, Pete Robbins & Steve Peck
- Mix engineers: Bob Rosa, Keith Diamond, Lionel Job
- Mastered by Ted Jensen

== Charts ==
=== Weekly charts ===
Weekly chart performance for Restless
Chart (1985–1986)	Peak position
US Billboard 200	60
US Top R&B/Hip-Hop Albums (Billboard)	14

=== Year-end charts ===
Year-end chart performance for Restless
Chart (1986)	Position
US Billboard 200	72
US Top R&B/Hip-Hop Albums (Billboard)	22
