= Joe Public (album) =

Studio album by Joe Public
- Released: January 28, 1992
- Recorded: October–December 1991
- Studio: Minot Sound (White Plains, NY)
- Genres: R&B; new jack swing
- Length: 45:17
- Label: Columbia
- Producers: Joe Public; Lionel Job

Joe Public chronology
Joe Public (1992)	Easy Come, Easy Go (1994)

Singles from Joe Public
- 1. "Live and Learn" Released: 1992; 2. "I Miss You" Released: 1992; 3. "I've Been Watchin'" Released: 1992; 4. "Do You Everynite" Released: 1992; 5. "This One's for You" Released: 1993

Professional ratings
Review scores
Source	Rating
AllMusic	4/5 stars
Entertainment Weekly	A−

Joe Public is the debut studio album by American new jack swing quartet Joe Public. from Buffalo New York. It was released on January 28, 1992, via Columbia Records. The recording sessions took place at Minot Sound Studio in White Plains, New York. The album was produced by Lionel Job and Joe Public.

The album peaked at number 111 on the Billboard 200, number 23 on the Top R&B/Hip-Hop Albums and number 2 on the Heatseekers Albums charts in the United States, as well as number 93 in Germany and number 137 in Australia.

The album spawned five singles: "Live and Learn", "I Miss You", "I've Been Watchin'", "Do You Everynite" and "This One's For You".

== Track listing ==
No.	Title	Writer(s)	Length
1.	"Live and Learn"	Jake Carter; Joe Sayles; Kevin Scott; Dwight Wyatt; Nate Sayles; James Brown; Bobby Byrd; Ron Lenhoff
2.	"I've Been Watchin'"	Carter; J. Sayles; Scott; Wyatt; Christopher Moore
3.	"I Miss You"	Carter; J. Sayles; Scott; Wyatt
4.	"I Gotta Thang"	Carter; J. Sayles; Scott; Wyatt; Brown; Byrd; Charles Bobbit
5.	"Anything"	Carter; J. Sayles; Scott; Wyatt; Rod Temperton; James Todd Smith; Bobby Ervin; Darryl Pierce; Dwayne Simon
6.	"This One's for You"	Carter; J. Sayles; Scott; Wyatt; Brown; Byrd; Lenhoff
7.	"I Like It"	Carter; J. Sayles; Scott; Wyatt; Moore; Brown; Alfred Ellis
8.	"Touch You"	Carter; J. Sayles; Scott; Wyatt
9.	"Do You Everynite"	Carter; J. Sayles; Scott; Wyatt; Lionel Job
10.	"When I Look in Your Eyes"	Carter; J. Sayles; Scott; Wyatt
Total length:			45:17

== Charts ==
=== Weekly charts ===
Chart (1992)	Peak position
Australian Albums (ARIA)	137
German Albums (Offizielle Top 100)	93
US Billboard 200	111
US Top R&B/Hip-Hop Albums (Billboard)	23
US Heatseekers Albums (Billboard)	2

=== Year-end charts ===
Chart (1992)	Position
US Top R&B/Hip-Hop Albums (Billboard)	57
