= Stranger Things 5 (soundtrack) =

Soundtrack album by Kyle Dixon and Michael Stein
- Released: January 1, 2026
- Genre: Soundtrack
- Length: 85:35 (Vol. 1); 85:59 (Vol. 2)
- Label: Lakeshore; Invada
- Producer: Kyle Dixon; Michael Stein

Kyle Dixon and Michael Stein chronology
Stranger Things: Soundtrack from the Netflix Series, Season 4 (2022)	Stranger Things 5 (2026)	Stranger Things: Soundtrack from the Netflix Series, Season 5 (2026)

The original soundtrack album for the fifth and final season of the Netflix series Stranger Things, titled Stranger Things 5, was released on January 1, 2026, via Lakeshore and Invada Records. Like the previous four seasons, the soundtrack was composed by Kyle Dixon and Michael Stein of the electronic band Survive. The album had a digital-only release compiling of ninety-five tracks split into two volumes, and had a nearly three-hour duration.

== Background ==
Kyle Dixon and Michael Stein worked on three years for the final season, that had them working on 6–7 days per week, and added that the score had several sonic ties to the previous seasons, as a continuation, hence they had to reinvent those older themes and modify it with newer orchestrations, arrangements and production while providing a lot of colors on the score.

== Reception ==
Damien Knightley of Still Listening wrote "The score is rich with nostalgia and atmosphere, and the series simply would not be the same without it." Shaurya Thapa of Time Out called it a "synth-heavy and dark, atmospheric score."

== Track listing ==
Stranger Things 5 – Vol. 1
No.	Title	Length
1.	"Holly the Heroic"	2:58
2.	"Starr"	1:32
3.	"Double How"	1:05
4.	"Like I Could Fly"	1:12
5.	"WSQK"	1:20
6.	"We're Friends, Good Friends"	1:46
7.	"Preppers"	2:43
8.	"With a Second to Spare"	2:01
9.	"8 Hours"	1:42
10.	"Running to Lucas"	1:09
11.	"Even Comes with a View"	1:52
12.	"Mr. What's It?"	2:38
13.	"Will the Wizard"	1:37
14.	"Mac-Z"	1:28
15.	"Andy and His Goons"	1:40
16.	"Eventually They'll Get Bored"	1:52
17.	"Barely Missed the Jaguar"	2:12
18.	"Too Many Names"	2:27
19.	"Miller"	0:50
20.	"Humvees"	0:53
21.	"Another Crawl"	2:38
22.	"Like a Sorcerer"	1:24
23.	"Smoke Em if You Got Em"	1:40
24.	"Keep Your Trap Shut"	2:18
25.	"Wolfpack"	1:22
26.	"Psychic Interrogation"	1:45
27.	"Gooey Creamy Core"	1:06
28.	"D.O.E"	1:20
29.	"Safety Lock"	1:30
30.	"Engage"	2:00
31.	"KK-GO"	1:38
32.	"The Wall"	2:12
33.	"Unrecognizable Carcass"	1:55
34.	"Psionic Blast"	1:02
35.	"Heavens to Betsy"	2:03
36.	"Pale Brown Mist"	3:30
37.	"Situation: Not Great"	3:02
38.	"Mist Engulfs the Lab"	1:40
39.	"Red Lightning Scorches the Sky"	1:17
40.	"Isolation Tank"	1:24
41.	"Nosebleed"	2:11
42.	"Camazotz Woods"	1:30
43.	"Super Shredder"	1:30
44.	"Red Portal Opens"	2:36
45.	"Sisters"	1:13
46.	"Never Forget"	2:06
47.	"End Credits"	2:46
Total length:		85:35

Stranger Things 5 – Vol. 2
No.	Title	Length
1.	"Don't Be a Stubborn Punk Ass Like You?"	2:06
2.	"Hawkins Hitmakers"	1:24
3.	"Hide in the Light"	2:06
4.	"Karen's Back"	0:58
5.	"You Die, I Die"	1:50
6.	"Chaotic Good, Chaotic Bad"	1:54
7.	"Just Us and the Crickets"	1:35
8.	"Life Has Been So Unfair to You"	1:43
9.	"Map to a Secret Location"	1:32
10.	"Telemetry Tracker"	1:49
11.	"He's Still Human"	1:26
12.	"Operation Beanstalk"	2:18
13.	"Move Worlds"	1:40
14.	"Zone G1"	1:50
15.	"Dead Wrong"	1:06
16.	"Scorched Sky"	2:00
17.	"The Tunnels"	1:23
18.	"The Abyss"	2:48
19.	"Turnbow Trap"	2:14
20.	"November 6, 1983"	2:26
21.	"The Order of the Black Hand"	1:12
22.	"Shield Generator"	1:27
23.	"Just a Memory"	1:33
24.	"50,000 Watts"	1:01
25.	"Meet Me at the X"	2:16
26.	"Memory Go Round"	1:35
27.	"Real Life Honest to God Sorcerer"	1:19
28.	"Secret Government Program"	2:02
29.	"Seeing in Technicolor"	1:01
30.	"Evil Planet Descending"	1:09
31.	"Shower of Black Blood"	1:46
32.	"Fourth & Final Gate"	1:52
33.	"Hiding in the Sky"	2:22
34.	"Darkness Spread Around the World"	2:20
35.	"Afraid to Look for You"	3:31
36.	"A Love Supreme"	2:39
37.	"She Has Corrupted Your Mind"	1:34
38.	"Exotic Matter"	1:39
39.	"Vessels"	1:32
40.	"Darkside of the Wall"	2:29
41.	"Siege in Dimension X"	2:42
42.	"I Don't Like Girls"	1:16
43.	"Make Sure This Never Happens Again"	1:21
44.	"You Are the Curse"	1:22
45.	"New Numbers"	1:24
46.	"Three Waterfalls"	0:43
47.	"What's on the Other Side of the Wall?"	1:15
48.	"I Need You to Believe in Me"	3:29
Total length:		85:59

== Chart performance ==
Weekly chart performance for Stranger Things 5
Chart (2026)	Peak position
New Zealand Albums (RMNZ)	23
UK Album Downloads (OCC)	20
US Top Soundtracks (Billboard)	18
