= Live and Learn (Joe Public song) =

1992 single by Joe Public

Single by Joe Public

from the album Joe Public
- Released: 1992
- Genre: New jack swing
- Length: 4:23 (album version); 3:58 (radio edit)
- Label: Columbia
- Songwriters: Dwight Wyatt; Jake Carter; Joe Sayles; Kevin Scott; Nathan Sayles
- Producers: Joe Public; Lionel Job

Joe Public singles chronology
"Do You Everynite" (1991)	"Live and Learn" (1992)	"I Miss You" (1992)

Music video
- "Live and Learn" on YouTube

"Live and Learn" is a song by American new jack swing group Joe Public, released in March 1992 by Columbia Records as the second single from their self-titled debut album (1992). The song, produced by the group with Lionel Job, was a success, peaking at numbers four and five on the US Billboard Hot 100 and Cash Box Top 100, number three in the Netherlands and New Zealand, and number 10 in Belgium. In 2012, it was ranked number 16 on Complex magazine's list of the "25 Best New Jack Swing Songs of All Time".

== Samples ==
The song heavily utilizes sampling; the song samples the drum break from Digital Underground's "The Humpty Dance". The squealing trumpet glissando heard throughout is a sample from "The Grunt" by the J.B.'s. Vocal samples from James Brown's "Get Up, Get Into It, Get Involved" and the Soul Children's "I Don't Know What This World Is Coming To" are present, as well as replayed samples of "All Your Goodies Are Gone" by Parliament and "Peg" by Steely Dan.

== Track listings ==
- US 12-inch single

A1. "Live and Learn" (12-inch remix) – 6:44
A2. "Live and Learn" (Public dance mix) – 6:14
A3. "Live and Learn" (radio version with rap) – 3:58
B1. "Live and Learn" (extended dub mix) – 5:18
B2. "Live and Learn" (Public dub) – 4:15

- US and UK cassette single; UK 7-inch single
1. "Live and Learn" (radio version with rap) – 3:58
2. "Live and Learn" (Public dub) – 5:10
- Australian cassette single
1. "Live and Learn" (radio version with rap) – 3:58
2. "Live and Learn" (extended dub mix) – 5:18
- Australian and UK CD single
1. "Live and Learn" (radio version with rap) – 3:58
2. "Live and Learn" (12-inch remix) – 6:44
3. "Live and Learn" (extended dub mix) – 5:18
4. "Live and Learn" (LP extended) – 4:59
- UK 12-inch single

A1. "Live and Learn" (12-inch remix) – 6:44
A3. "Live and Learn" (radio version with rap) – 3:58
B1. "Live and Learn" (extended dub mix) – 5:18
B2. "Live and Learn" (LP extended mix) – 4:59

== Charts ==
=== Weekly charts ===
Chart (1992)	Peak position
Australia (ARIA)	45
Belgium (Ultratop 50 Flanders)	10
Canada Top Singles (RPM)	41
Canada Dance/Urban (RPM)	6
Europe (European Dance Radio)	1
Germany (GfK)	16
Netherlands (Dutch Top 40)	3
Netherlands (Single Top 100)	4
New Zealand (Recorded Music NZ)	3
Sweden (Sverigetopplistan)	22
UK Singles (Official Charts)	43
UK Dance (Music Week)	13
UK Club Chart (Music Week)	30
US Billboard Hot 100	4
US 12-inch Singles Sales (Billboard)	19
US Dance Club Play (Billboard)	36
US Hot R&B Singles (Billboard)	3
US Cash Box Top 100	5

=== Year-end charts ===
Chart (1992)	Position
Belgium (Ultratop)	83
Europe (European Dance Radio)	23
Germany (Media Control)	84
Netherlands (Dutch Top 40)	43
Netherlands (Single Top 100)	45
New Zealand (RIANZ)	29
US Billboard Hot 100	30
US Hot R&B Singles (Billboard)	30
US Cash Box Top 100	42
