= Stranger Things: Halloween Sounds from the Upside Down =

Soundtrack album by Kyle Dixon and Michael Stein
- Released: October 5, 2018
- Genre: Soundtrack
- Length: 49:08
- Labels: Lakeshore; Invada
- Producers: Kyle Dixon; Michael Stein

Stranger Things: Halloween Sounds from the Upside Down is a supplemental compilation soundtrack album with unreleased cues used in the second season of the Netflix series Stranger Things that had a digital release on October 5, 2018, via Lakeshore and Invada Records. The music on the album was produced by the series' longtime composers Kyle Dixon and Michael Stein of the electronic band Survive, and was previously available only as bonus tracks for the iTunes edition of the soundtrack album for Stranger Things 2. The album was also released physically as an orange-colored vinyl record and a picture disc for an exclusive limited run on Record Store Day's annual Black Friday event.

== Track listing ==
No.	Title	Length
1.	"Turn on the Lights"	1:44
2.	"Sick of Cow"	4:04
3.	"Power Maintenance"	1:32
4.	"Roars from the Lab"	2:33
5.	"Mercy"	4:04
6.	"Shadow in the Tunnel"	4:21
7.	"Do You Accept the Risk?"	0:26
8.	"Tree Slime"	1:11
9.	"Entering the Cellar"	2:06
10.	"A Familiar Shape"	6:50
11.	"The Spy"	4:49
12.	"Turn Right & Run"	7:13
13.	"They Hurt Me"	5:04
14.	"Possessed"	3:11
Total length:		49:08

Notes

- The track "Controlled Contamination" from the iTunes edition of Stranger Things 2 is not included. Along with this, the order of tracks 7–10 is slightly different on the iTunes edition (tracks 10, 8, 7 and 9, respectively).
