= Object of My Desire =

1985 song by Starpoint

Single by Starpoint

from the album Restless
- B-side: "Send Me a Letter"
- Released: March 12, 1985
- Length: 5:06 (album version); 5:40 (vocal 12-inch version); 3:51 (single version)
- Label: Elektra
- Songwriters: Ernesto Phillips; Keith Diamond; Ky Adeyemo
- Producers: Keith Diamond; Lionel Job

"Object of My Desire" is a song recorded by American group Starpoint from the album Restless. The song was released in 1985 by Elektra Records.

It came in as the 93rd biggest song of 1986 according to the Billboard Year-End. No song that peaked as low as number 25 would crack the year-end until seven years later.

The tune was a major hit for the group, becoming their first single to crack the top ten on the R&B singles chart, reaching number 8, and the top 40 on the pop charts, peaking at number 25. It also entered the dance charts, peaking at number 12, and number 7 on the Dance "Maxi singles" charts. In the United Kingdom, the song reached number 96 on the pop chart.

In 2005, American DJ Dana Rayne released a dance-oriented cover of the song that charted at number 7 in the United Kingdom in early January.

It was featured on General Hospital in 1986 and in the season four premiere of Stranger Things in 2022.

== Chart performance ==
=== Weekly charts ===
Weekly chart performance for "Object of My Desire"
Chart (1985–1986)	Peak position
UK Singles (OCC)	96
US Hot 100	25
US Billboard Black Singles	8
US Billboard Hot Dance Music/Maxi-Singles Sales	7
US Billboard Hot Dance Music/Club Play	12

=== Year-end charts ===
Year-end chart performance for "Object of My Desire"
Chart (1986)	Rank
US Top Pop Singles (Billboard)	93
