= Stranger Things: Soundtrack from the Netflix Series, Season 4 =

Soundtrack album by Various artists
- Released: May 27, 2022 (Vol. 1); July 1, 2022 (Vol. 2)
- Genre: Soundtrack
- Length: 53:41 (Vol. 1); 79:14 (Vol. 2)
- Label: Legacy

Stranger Things: Soundtrack from the Netflix Series, Season 4 is the non-original composition soundtrack companion to the fourth season of the Netflix series Stranger Things. The album, which includes twenty-two popular period songs used in the show, was released digitally in two parts by Legacy Recordings on May 27, 2022, and July 1, 2022, to coincide with the release of the first and second volumes of the season.

== Track listing ==
Stranger Things: Music from the Netflix Original Series, Season 4 – Vol. 1
No.	Title	Performers(s)	Length
1.	"Separate Ways (Worlds Apart)" (Bryce Miller/Alloy Tracks remix)	Journey	2:45
2.	"California Dreamin'"	The Beach Boys	3:21
3.	"Psycho Killer"	Talking Heads	4:18
4.	"Running Up That Hill (A Deal with God)"	Kate Bush	5:00
5.	"You Spin Me Round (Like a Record)"	Dead or Alive	3:14
6.	"Chica Mejicanita"	Mae Arnette	2:27
7.	"Play with Me"	Extreme	3:27
8.	"Detroit Rock City" (single version)	Kiss	3:35
9.	"I Was a Teenage Werewolf"	The Cramps	3:03
10.	"Pass the Dutchie"	Musical Youth	3:22
11.	"Wipeout"	The Surfaris	2:14
12.	"Object of My Desire" (single version)	Starpoint	3:54
13.	"Rock Me Amadeus" (The Gold mix)	Falco	3:46
14.	"Travelin' Man"	Ricky Nelson	2:20
15.	"Tarzan Boy"	Baltimora	3:49
16.	"Dream a Little Dream of Me"	Louis Armstrong and Ella Fitzgerald	3:06

Stranger Things: Music from the Netflix Original Series, Season 4 – Vol. 2 (extra tracks)
No.	Title	Performers(s)	Length
17.	"Rock and Roll, Hoochie Koo"	Rick Derringer	2:53
18.	"Fire and Rain"	James Taylor	3:22
19.	"Spellbound"	Siouxsie and the Banshees	3:15
20.	"Master of Puppets"	Metallica	8:34
21.	"When It's Cold I'd Like to Die"	Moby	4:12
22.	"Separate Ways (Worlds Apart)" (Steve Perry and Bryce Miller extended remix)	Journey and Steve Perry	3:17

== Charts ==
=== Weekly charts ===
Weekly chart performance for Stranger Things: Soundtrack from the Netflix Series, Season 4
Chart (2022–2026)	Peak position
Australian Albums (ARIA)	8
Austrian Albums (Ö3 Austria)	22
Belgian Albums (Ultratop Flanders)	13
Belgian Albums (Ultratop Wallonia)	8
Dutch Albums (Album Top 100)	33
German Albums (Offizielle Top 100)	11
Hungarian Physical Albums (MAHASZ)	34
New Zealand Albums (RMNZ)	6
Polish Albums (ZPAV)	19
Spanish Albums (Promusicae)	89
Swiss Albums (Schweizer Hitparade)	18
UK Soundtrack Albums (OCC)	5
US Billboard 200	42
US Billboard Top Soundtracks	1

=== Year-end charts ===
Year-end chart performance for Stranger Things: Soundtrack from the Netflix Series, Season 4
Chart (2022)	Position
New Zealand Albums (RMNZ)	42

== Certifications ==
Certifications for Stranger Things: Music from the Netflix Original Series, Season 4
Region	Certification	Certified units/sales
New Zealand (RMNZ)	Gold	7,500^{‡}
^{‡} Sales+streaming figures based on certification alone.

== Release history ==
Release history and formats for Stranger Things: Music from the Netflix Original Series, Season 4
Date	Volume(s)	Format(s)	Label	Ref.
May 27, 2022	Vol. 1	Digital download; streaming	Legacy	
July 1, 2022	Vol. 2	Digital download; streaming	Legacy	
September 9, 2022	Vols. 1 and 2 (Complete)	Cassette; CD	Legacy	
November 4, 2022	Vols. 1 and 2 (Complete)	LP	Legacy	
