= Easy Come, Easy Go (Joe Public album) =

Studio album by Joe Public
- Released: July 26, 1994
- Recorded: 1993–1994
- Genres: R&B, new jack swing
- Label: Columbia
- Producer: Joe Public

Joe Public chronology
Joe Public (1992)	Easy Come, Easy Go (1994)

Professional ratings
Review scores
Source	Rating
Allmusic	2.5/5 stars

Easy Come, Easy Go is the second studio album, released in 1994, by the American new jack swing group Joe Public.

== Track listing ==
No.	Title	Length
1.	"Easy Come, Easy Go"	4:38
2.	"Deeper"	4:38
3.	"Your Love Is On"	4:22
4.	"This Time"	5:01
5.	"Things You Do 4 Luv"	4:02
6.	"Call Me"	4:34
7.	"Fly"	4:47
8.	"I Won't Let Go"	5:10
9.	"I L.O.V.E. U"	4:49
10.	"Rumors"	3:57
11.	"What Goes Around"	4:14
