= Primetime Emmy Award for Outstanding Music Supervision =

Television award category

- Awarded for: Outstanding Music Supervision
- Country: United States
- Presented by: Academy of Television Arts & Sciences
- Currently held by: Widow's Bay (2026)
- Website: emmys.com

This is a list of the winning and nominated programs of the Primetime Emmy Award for Outstanding Music Supervision. The award was instituted in 2017.

In the following list, the first titles listed in gold are the winners; those not in gold are nominees, which are listed in alphabetical order. The years given are those in which the ceremonies took place:

== Winners and nominations ==
=== 2010s ===
Year	Program	Episode	Nominee(s)	Network
2017 (69th)
2017 (69th)	Big Little Lies	"You Get What You Need"	Susan Jacobs	HBO
2017 (69th)	Better Call Saul	"Sunk Costs"	Thomas Golubić	AMC
2017 (69th)	Girls	"Goodbye Tour"	Manish Raval, Jonathan Leahy and Tom Wolfe	HBO
2017 (69th)	Master of None	"Amarsi Un Po"	Zach Cowie and Kerri Drootin	Netflix
2017 (69th)	Stranger Things	"Chapter Two: The Weirdo on Maple Street"	Nora Felder	Netflix
2018 (70th)
2018 (70th)	The Marvelous Mrs. Maisel	"Pilot"	Robin Urdang, Amy Sherman-Palladino and Daniel Palladino	Prime Video
2018 (70th)	Atlanta	"Alligator Man"	Jen Malone and Fam Udeorji	FX
2018 (70th)	Stranger Things	"Chapter Two: Trick or Treat, Freak"	Nora Felder	Netflix
2018 (70th)	This Is Us	"That'll Be the Day"	Jennifer Pyken	NBC
2018 (70th)	Westworld	"Akane No Mai"	Sean O'Meara	HBO
2019 (71st)
2019 (71st)	The Marvelous Mrs. Maisel	"We're Going to the Catskills!"	Robin Urdang, Amy Sherman-Palladino and Daniel Palladino	Prime Video
2019 (71st)	Better Call Saul	"Something Stupid"	Thomas Golubić	AMC
2019 (71st)	Fosse/Verdon	"Life Is a Cabaret"	Steven Gizicki	FX
2019 (71st)	Quincy		Jasper Leak	Netflix
2019 (71st)	Russian Doll	"Nothing in This World Is Easy"	Brienne Rose	Netflix

=== 2020s ===
Year	Program	Episode	Nominee(s)	Network
2020 (72nd)
2020 (72nd)	The Marvelous Mrs. Maisel	"It's Comedy or Cabbage"	Robin Urdang, Amy Sherman-Palladino and Daniel Palladino	Prime Video
2020 (72nd)	Better Call Saul	"The Guy for This"	Thomas Golubić	AMC
2020 (72nd)	Euphoria	"And Salt the Earth Behind You"	Jen Malone and Adam Leber	HBO
2020 (72nd)	Insecure	"Lowkey Movin' On"	Kier Lehman	HBO
2020 (72nd)	Killing Eve	"Meetings Have Biscuits"	Catherine Grieves and David Holmes	BBC America
2020 (72nd)	Stranger Things	"Chapter Three: The Case of the Missing Lifeguard"	Nora Felder	Netflix
2020 (72nd)	Watchmen	"This Extraordinary Being"	Liza Richardson	HBO
2021 (73rd)
2021 (73rd)	I May Destroy You	"Ego Death"	Ciara Elwis and Matt Biffa	HBO
2021 (73rd)	Bridgerton	"Diamond of the First Water"	Alexandra Patsavas	Netflix
2021 (73rd)	The Crown	"Fairytale"	Sarah Bridge	Netflix
2021 (73rd)	Halston	"The Party's Over"	Amanda Krieg Thomas, Alexis Martin Woodall and Ryan Murphy	Netflix
2021 (73rd)	Lovecraft Country	"Strange Case"	Liza Richardson	HBO
2021 (73rd)	The Queen's Gambit	"Adjournment"	Randall Poster	Netflix
2021 (73rd)	WandaVision	"Don't Touch That Dial"	Dave Jordan and Shannon Murphy	Disney+
2022 (74th)
2022 (74th)	Stranger Things	"Chapter Four: Dear Billy"	Nora Felder	Netflix
2022 (74th)	Better Call Saul	"Black and Blue"	Thomas Golubić	AMC
2022 (74th)	Euphoria	"Trying to Get to Heaven Before They Close the Door"	Jen Malone and Adam Leber	HBO
2022 (74th)	The Marvelous Mrs. Maisel	"How Do You Get to Carnegie Hall?"	Robin Urdang	Prime Video
2022 (74th)	Ozark	"The Cousin of Death"	Gabe Hilfer	Netflix
2022 (74th)	The White Lotus	"Departures"	Janet Lopez	HBO
2023 (75th)
2023 (75th)	The White Lotus	"Bull Elephants"	Gabe Hilfer	HBO
2023 (75th)	Daisy Jones & the Six	"Track 8: Looks Like We Made It"	Frankie Pine	Prime Video
2023 (75th)	The Marvelous Mrs. Maisel	"Four Minutes"	Robin Urdang	Prime Video
2023 (75th)	Stranger Things	"Chapter Nine: The Piggyback"	Nora Felder	Netflix
2023 (75th)	Ted Lasso	"So Long, Farewell"	Tony Von Pervieux and Christa Miller	Apple TV+
2024 (76th)
2024 (76th)	Fallout	"The End"	Trygge Toven	Prime Video
2024 (76th)	Baby Reindeer	"Episode 4"	Catherine Grieves	Netflix
2024 (76th)	Fargo	"The Tragedy of the Commons"	Maggie Phillips	FX
2024 (76th)	Mr. & Mrs. Smith	"A Breakup"	Jen Malone	Prime Video
2024 (76th)	Only Murders in the Building	"Grab Your Hankies"	Bruce Gilbert and Lauren Marie Mikus	Hulu
2024 (76th)	True Detective: Night Country	"Part 4"	Susan Jacobs	HBO
2025 (77th)
2025 (77th)	The Studio	"The Promotion"	Gabe Hilfer	Apple TV+
2025 (77th)	Hacks	"I Love L.A."	Matt Biffa	HBO Max
2025 (77th)	The Last of Us	"The Price"	Evyen Klean, Ian Broucek and Scott Hanau	HBO
2025 (77th)	The Righteous Gemstones	"You Hurled Me Into the Very Heart of the Seas"	DeVoe Yates and Gabe Hilfer	HBO
2025 (77th)	Severance	"Cold Harbor"	George Drakoulias	Apple TV+
2025 (77th)	The White Lotus	"Same Spirits, New Forms"	Gabe Hilfer	HBO
2026 (78th)
2026 (78th)	Widow's Bay	"Beach Reads"	Toko Nagata	Apple TV
2026 (78th)	The Boys	"Blood and Bone"	Michelle Johnson and Yvette Metoyer	Prime Video
2026 (78th)	Hacks	"Hacks"	Matt Biffa	HBO Max
2026 (78th)	Nobody Wants This	"When Noah Met Joanne"	Manish Raval, Tom Wolfe and Jonathan Leahy	Netflix
2026 (78th)	Pluribus	"We Is Us"	Thomas Golubić	Apple TV
2026 (78th)	Stranger Things	"Chapter Eight: The Rightside Up"	Nora Felder	Netflix

== Programs with multiple awards ==
3 awards

- The Marvelous Mrs. Maisel

== Programs with multiple nominations ==
6 nominations

- Stranger Things

5 nominations

- The Marvelous Mrs. Maisel

4 nominations

- Better Call Saul

3 nominations

- The White Lotus

2 nominations

- Euphoria
- Hacks
