= Stranger Things (soundtrack) =

2016 soundtrack album by Kyle Dixon and Michael Stein

Stranger Things, Vol. 1
- Standard cover

Soundtrack album by Kyle Dixon and Michael Stein
- Released: August 12, 2016
- Genre: Synthwave
- Length: 1:08:40
- Labels: Lakeshore; Invada
- Producers: Kyle Dixon; Michael Stein

Stranger Things, Vol. 2
- Deluxe cover

Soundtrack album by Kyle Dixon and Michael Stein
- Released: August 19, 2016
- Genre: Soundtrack
- Length: 1:13:16
- Labels: Lakeshore; Invada
- Producers: Kyle Dixon; Michael Stein

Stranger Things is the original soundtrack for the first season of the Netflix series of the same name. The first and second volume were released digitally by Lakeshore and Ivada Records on August 12 and 19, 2016, respectively. Consisting of 75 songs produced and composed by Kyle Dixon and Michael Stein of the electronic band Survive, this release sums up to the duo's first collaboration outside of the band. The CD release of the soundtrack was similar to the digital rollout, with the first and second volumes being released on September 16 and 23, respectively, and limited editions on vinyl, in both individual and boxed sets, were released in July 2017. A cassette version of the first volume of the soundtrack, sold exclusively by Urban Outfitters, was released on July 14, 2017. The cassette packaging features a cardboard cover that emulates an old VHS sleeve, while the cassette tape is made to look like a VHS tape.

Both volumes were nominated individually for Best Score Soundtrack for Visual Media at the 59th Annual Grammy Awards, though neither won.

== Track listings ==
=== Volume 1 ===
The first volume of the soundtrack was released on August 12, 2016, and features the show's wildly popular main theme, along with a number of the season's other common musical motifs ("Kids" and "Hawkins"), and Eleven's theme ("Eleven").

Stranger Things, Vol. 1
No.	Title	Length
1.	"Stranger Things"	1:07
2.	"Kids"	2:38
3.	"Nancy and Barb"	1:05
4.	"This Isn't You"	2:23
5.	"Lay-Z-Boy"	1:34
6.	"Friendship"	1:12
7.	"Eleven"	3:14
8.	"A Kiss"	1:25
9.	"Castle Byers"	2:47
10.	"Hawkins"	5:00
11.	"The Upside Down"	5:07
12.	"After Sarah"	1:25
13.	"One Blink for Yes"	1:46
14.	"Photos in the Woods"	4:32
15.	"Fresh Blood"	1:16
16.	"Lamps"	1:15
17.	"Hallucinations"	1:36
18.	"Hanging Lights"	1:33
19.	"Biking to School"	0:44
20.	"Are You Sure?"	2:26
21.	"Agents"	0:50
22.	"Papa"	1:27
23.	"Cops Are Good at Finding"	1:08
24.	"No Weapons"	3:24
25.	"Walking Through the Upside Down"	1:19
26.	"She'll Kill You"	2:05
27.	"Run Away"	1:47
28.	"No Autopsy"	1:03
29.	"Dispatch"	0:41
30.	"Joyce and Lonnie Fighting"	1:02
31.	"Lights Out"	1:04
32.	"Hazmat Suits"	1:43
33.	"Theoretically"	1:33
34.	"You Can Talk to Me"	0:53
35.	"What Else Is There to Do?"	1:59
36.	"Hawkins Lab"	2:37
Total length:		1:08:40

=== Volume 2 ===
The second volume of the soundtrack was released on August 19, 2016, and features an extended version of the show's main theme as well as an alternate version of one of the show's more prominent musical motifs, "Kids" ("Kids Two").

Stranger Things, Vol. 2
No.	Title	Length
1.	"Hopper Sneaks In"	1:38
2.	"I Know What I Saw"	2:43
3.	"Rolling out the Pool"	1:12
4.	"Over"	1:38
5.	"Gearing Up"	1:57
6.	"Flickering"	0:46
7.	"First Kiss"	1:46
8.	"Crying"	1:16
9.	"Walking Down the Tracks"	0:54
10.	"Where's Barb?"	1:57
11.	"Speak of the Devil"	2:49
12.	"Danger Danger"	2:57
13.	"Tribulations"	1:13
14.	"Flashback"	1:37
15.	"Kids Two"	2:56
16.	"Talking to Australia"	1:00
17.	"Night of the Seventh"	1:35
18.	"See Any Rain?"	0:41
19.	"Coffee & Contemplation"	1:12
20.	"Inside the Black Room"	1:27
21.	"Starts to Rain"	1:33
22.	"Eleven Is Gone"	1:54
23.	"Time for a 187"	0:57
24.	"Something in the House"	2:08
25.	"Still Pretty"	1:50
26.	"Abilities"	1:32
27.	"Tendril"	0:26
28.	"They Found Us"	3:00
29.	"Bad Men"	1:06
30.	"Spiked Bat"	1:17
31.	"Making Contact"	2:01
32.	"What Do You Know?"	1:54
33.	"It's Not My Boy"	2:07
34.	"Something in the Wall"	1:35
35.	"Let's Go"	0:38
36.	"Leap of Faith"	3:30
37.	"In Pursuit"	2:17
38.	"Breaking and Entering"	4:52
39.	"Stranger Things" (Extended Version)	5:25
Total length:		1:13:16

== Charts ==
Volume One garnered 14,000 "equivalent album units" in the United States in its first week of sale according to Nielsen Soundscan.

Chart (2016)	Peak position
Australian Albums (ARIA)	40
Belgium Albums (Ultratop Flanders)	18
Belgian Albums (Ultratop Wallonia)	70
Canadian Albums (Billboard)	61
French Albums (SNEP)	174
Spanish Albums (Promusicae)	69
US Billboard 200	24
US Independent Albums (Billboard)	2
US Top Soundtracks (Billboard)	2
