= Craig Henighan =

Canadian-American sound editor and engineer

- Education: Sheridan College
- Occupations: Sound editor and engineer

Craig Henighan is a Canadian-American sound editor and engineer. He was nominated for an Academy Award in the category Best Sound for the film Roma.

In addition to his Academy Award nomination, he won five Primetime Emmy Awards and was nominated for four more in the categories Outstanding Sound Editing and Outstanding Sound Mixing for his work on the television programs Stranger Things and Love, Death & Robots.

== Selected filmography ==
- Roma (2018; co-nominated with Skip Lievsay and José Antonio Garcia)
