= Starpoint =

American R&B and funk band

- Origin: Crownsville, Maryland, United States
- Genres: R&B, funk, post-disco, new jack swing
- Years active: 1978–1990
- Labels: Chocolate City; Boardwalk Records; Elektra, Warner Bros.
- Past members: Renée Diggs ✝ Kayode Adeyemo ✝ George Phillips Jr. ✝ Ernesto McKenzie Phillips ✝ Gregory Phillips; Orlando Phillips

Starpoint was an American R&B and funk band from Maryland that was active from 1978 to 1990 recording 10 albums during that time. It comprised four brothers and two other musicians. The ten albums released did well, some reaching the US R&B Charts.

== Biography ==
=== Beginnings ===
The five Phillips Brothers (George, Ernesto, Lloyd, Orlando, and Gregory) started a band that played in the basement and living room doing small parties held by their father, Dr. George McKenzie Phillips. The first band was JR and the Royals, featuring George Phillips, Jr. The brothers later added Kayode "Ky" Adeyemo. Ernesto took over as leader of the band when George and Lloyd were sent to college. When George returned, he rejoined his brothers and introduced Renee Diggs to the band. The brothers welcomed Renee to join and a new group began as Licyndiana. Initially playing at parties and small venues, the group began writing music during this time, with Ernesto becoming the primary songwriter. The group decided to change their name to Starpoint and began making demo recordings to get signed to a major record company.

The demo recordings found their way to Lionel Job, who became the group's manager-producer. He took the same recordings to Ruben Rodriguez at Casablanca records, getting the group its first recording contract.

=== Success ===
At this point, Ernesto Phillips played lead guitar, as well as singing lead and backing vocals; Orlando Phillips played bass guitar, keyboards, and saxophone and sang background vocals; Gregory Phillips played drums, percussion background vocals; George Phillips, Jr. played keyboards and sang lead and background vocals. Renee Diggs shared principal lead and background vocal duties. In addition to being another vocalist, Kayode Adeyemo acted as a second bassist and keyboardist, primarily during live performances, though he did contribute instrumentally to the group's early studio albums, and more occasionally on future recordings. This lineup stayed intact for the next 12 years, honing a sound that was also shaped by various producers, including Lionel Job, Keith Diamond, Bernard Edwards and Teddy Riley (in addition to the bandmembers' own contributions to production).

In 1979, the band secured a national recording deal and released their self-titled debut album, Starpoint! in 1980. A single from the album, "I Just Wanna Dance with You," became their first top 20 hit on the R&B chart. They released at least one album every year throughout the first half of the 1980s. Elektra Records reissued their sole Boardwalk album, 1983's It's So Delicious. The album Restless brought them crossover success onto the Billboard Hot 100 with the single "Object of My Desire." Co-written by band members Kayode Adeyemo and Ernesto Phillips along with R&B musician/producer Keith Diamond, the tune also became Starpoint's first of several R&B top ten hits. The follow-up single "What You've Been Missin'" peaked at No. 9 in the R&B top ten. The title track "Restless" was also released as a single, peaking at No. 11 in the R&B charts.

The band embarked on a lengthy tour in support of the album, partially with Morris Day and later with Luther Vandross, Isley Jasper Isley, and Atlantic Starr. It was during this tour that Diggs was diagnosed with multiple sclerosis; however, she continued to tour and record with the group, without sacrificing her signature stage presence.

In 1987, the band released their follow-up album, Sensational, which featured a third top ten R&B hit, "He Wants My Body". Still, the overall commercial success of this album paled in comparison to its predecessor, with no singles approaching the Pop 40. The group went on to release two additional albums - Hot to the Touch (1988) and Have You Got What It Takes? (1990) - sustaining modest R&B chart success with various singles.

=== Individual post-Starpoint careers ===
In 1990, Renée Diggs recorded a solo album titled Oasis that was released in Europe. Several of the tracks on this album were co-written by Diggs and Starpoint guitarist Ernesto Phillips. She created the Renée Diggs Foundation for Multiple Sclerosis, to help bring attention to the disease. She died on March 18, 2005, due to a heart condition, at the age of 50. Oasis was released in the U.S. after her death.

In 2000, Ernesto Phillips began working with singer-songwriter Terry Cole (Sly Boots) and signed him to his label, Longevity Records. The pair would collaborate on many tracks from 2000–2001. He died on March 25, 2004, as the result of a stroke. The Ernesto Phillips Scholarship for Talented Youth was established in his memory and as a tribute to his efforts in helping younger children to realize their ambitions of becoming musicians.

Other band members became involved with songwriting and session work for R&B artists. In 1988, Adeyemo was credited with co-writing Milli Vanilli's hit "Girl You Know It's True". Milli Vanilli's accompanying American album, titled after the hit single, also featured a song composed by Ernesto Phillips, entitled "More Than You'll Ever Know".

From 2001 to 2006, Greg Phillips toured with Najee and Angela Bofill simultaneously.

In 2011, the band regrouped with the four remaining members George Phillips, Orlando Phillips, Ky Adeyemo, and Greg Phillips, performing a one-off live show in Lyon, France.

George Phillips died on February 3, 2021, from sepsis. His family established the George McKenzie Phillips, Jr. Fund for Mental Health and Drug Abuse Rehabilitation in his memory, reflecting his dedication and contributions to these fields as a counselor in his post-Starpoint career.

== Band members ==
- Renée Diggs: Lead vocals (July 23, 1954 – March 18, 2005)
- Ernesto McKenzie Phillips: Guitars, lead vocals (July 13, 1953 – March 25, 2004)
- Orlando Phillips: Bass guitar, keyboard bass, vocals, saxophone
- George Phillips, Jr.: Lead vocals, keyboards (died February 3, 2021)
- Greg Phillips: Drums, vocals, percussion
- Kayode Adeyemo: Second bass guitar, occasional keyboards during live performances (August 18, 1954 – April 7, 2025)

== Discography ==
=== Albums ===
Year	Album	Label	Peak chart positions	
Year	Album	Label	US	US R&B
1980	Starpoint	Chocolate City	62	—
1981	Keep on It	Chocolate City	138	31
1981	Wanting You	Chocolate City	—	—
1982	All Night Long	Chocolate City	—	52
1983	It's so Delicious	Boardwalk / Elektra	—	32
1984	It's All Yours	Elektra	—	—
1985	Restless	Elektra	60	14
1987	Sensational	Elektra	95	29
1988	Hot to the Touch	Elektra	—	75
1990	Have You Got What It Takes?	Elektra	—	—
"—" denotes releases that did not chart

=== Compilation albums ===
- 2005: Object of My Desire and Other Hits (includes singles released between 1983 and 1987)

=== Singles ===
Year	Single	Peak chart positions					Album
Year	Single	US	US Dance	US R&B	US Dance Sales	UK	Album
1980	"Get Ready, Get Down"	—	—	—	—	—	Starpoint
1980	"I Just Wanna Dance with You"	—	26	19	—	—	Starpoint
1980	"Gonna Lift You Up"	—	—	—	—	—	Starpoint
1980	"You're My Sunny Day"	—	—	—	—	—	Starpoint
1981	"Keep on It"	—	—	28	—	—	Keep on It
1981	"I Just Want to Be Your Lover"	—	—	—	—	—	Keep on It
1981	"I Want You Closer"	—	—	67	—	—	Keep on It
1981	"Wanting You"	—	—	66	—	—	Wanting You
1981	"Do What You Wanna Do"	—	—	56	—	—	Wanting You
1981	"Angel"	—	—	50	—	—	Wanting You
1982	"Get Your Body Up"	—	—	76	—	—	All Night Long
1982	"Bring Your Sweet Lovin' Back"	—	—	—	—	—	All Night Long
1982	"All Night Long"	—	—	69	—	—	All Night Long
1983	"It's so Delicious"	—	—	79	—	—	It's so Delicious
1983	"Don't Be so Serious"	—	46	14	—	—	It's so Delicious
1984	"It's All Yours"	—	23	17	—	84	It's All Yours
1984	"Breakout"	—	—	—	—	—	It's All Yours
1984	"Am I Still the One"	—	—	59	—	—	It's All Yours
1985	"Object of My Desire"	25	12	8	7	96	Restless
1985	"Emotions" (U.K. only)	—	—	—	—	—	Restless
1985	"What You Been Missin'"	84	—	9	—	—	Restless
1986	"Restless"	46	13	11	—	—	Restless
1986	"Til the End of Time"	—	—	64	—	—	Restless
1987	"He Wants My Body"	89	40	8	—	—	Sensational
1987	"D.Y.B.O."	—	—	25	—	—	Sensational
1987	"The More We Love"	—	—	30	—	—	Sensational
1987	"Touch of Your Love"	—	—	—	—	—	Sensational
1988	"Say You Will"	—	—	18	—	—	Hot to the Touch
1988	"Tough Act to Follow"	—	—	81	—	—	Hot to the Touch
1990	"I Want You - You Want Me"	—	9	32	—	—	Have You Got What It Takes?
1990	"Midnight Love"	—	—	45	—	—	Have You Got What It Takes?
1990	"Have You Got What It Takes?"	—	—	93	—	—	Have You Got What It Takes?
"—" denotes releases that did not chart
