= Joe Public (band) =

American contemporary R&B group

- Origin: Buffalo, New York, United States
- Genres: New jack swing, R&B, pop
- Years active: 1989–present
- Labels: Columbia Records (1991 - 1995)
- Members: Kevin Scott; Jake Carter; Dwight "Mr. Dew" Wyatt; Joe "J.R." Sayles

Joe Public is an American new jack swing group from Buffalo, New York. The group consists of lead singer and bass guitarist Kevin Scott, keyboardist and guitarist Jake Carter, percussionist and drummer Dwight "Mr. Dew" Wyatt and lead guitarist Joe "J.R." Sayles. They are best known for their hit single "Live and Learn," which reached #4 on the Billboard Hot 100 chart in 1992.

== Musical work ==
Joe Public evolved from the group Atension, signed to Island Records in 1989. Their debut album on Columbia Records, Joe Public, contained their hit single "Live and Learn" which became their only top-40 hit peaking at #4 on the Billboard Hot 100. Their follow-up single, "I Miss You" reached #55 on the same chart. Joe Public was the first-ever R&B group to perform on MTV's Unplugged series where they were also the back up band for Boyz II Men and Shanice. Joe Public was also the back up band for Kris Kross on The Arsenio Hall Show, which featured Jermaine Dupri's first national TV appearance.

They hosted the "NBA Jams Music Video," a VHS promotional release for the video game NBA Jam: Tournament Edition that contained music videos intercut with professional basketball highlight footage. The video for "Live and Learn" is contained on it, as well as improvised live footage between video segments.

They later released their second studio album Easy Come, Easy Go in 1994, also under Columbia Records.

They continued to act as songwriters, writing the song "Keep It Comin'" for fellow New Jack Swing artist Keith Sweat in 1991 as well as songs for Tyrese.

== Discography ==
=== Albums ===
- 1992: Joe Public #111 U.S., #23 U.S. R&B, #137 AUS
- 1994: Easy Come, Easy Go

=== Singles ===
Year	Single	Peak positions										Album
Year	Single	US	US R&B	US Dance	AUS	NZ	NED	BEL (FL)	GER	SWE	UK	Album
1992	"Live and Learn"	4	3	36	45	3	4	10	16	22	43	Joe Public
1992	"I Miss You"	55	8	—	—	18	—	—	—	—	—	Joe Public
1992	"I've Been Watchin'"	—	54	—	167	—	—	—	—	—	75	Joe Public
1992	"Do You Everynite"	98	—	—	—	—	—	—	—	—	—	Joe Public
1993	"This One's For You"	—	—	—	—	—	—	—	—	—	—	Joe Public
1994	"Easy Come, Easy Go"	—	81	—	—	13	—	—	—	—	—	Easy Come, Easy Go
"—" denotes releases that did not chart or were not released.
