= Chapter Four: Dear Billy =

- Stranger Things episode
- Promotional poster by Butcher Billy
- Episode no.: Season 4 Episode 4
- Directed by: Shawn Levy
- Written by: Paul Dichter
- Original release date: May 27, 2022
- Running time: 78 minutes

Guest appearances
- Robert Englund as Victor Creel; Dacre Montgomery as Billy Hargrove; Tom Wlaschiha as Dmitri Antonov / Enzo; Nikola Đuričko as Yuri Ismaylov; Mason Dye as Jason Carver; Myles Truitt as Patrick McKinney; Ed Amatrudo as Director Hatch; Kevin L. Johnson as Young Victor Creel; Livi Burch as Alice Creel; Tyner Rushing as Virginia Creel; Raphael Luce as Henry Creel; Ira Amyx as Agent Harmon; Kendrick Cross as Agent Wallace

Episode chronology
← Previous "Chapter Three: The Monster and the Superhero"	Next → "Chapter Five: The Nina Project"
- Stranger Things season 4

"Chapter Four: Dear Billy" is the fourth episode of the fourth season of the American science fiction horror drama television series Stranger Things, and the 29th episode overall. It was written by Paul Dichter and directed by Shawn Levy. The episode was released on May 27, 2022, on Netflix, alongside the six other episodes comprising volume 1 of the season.

Set on March 24, 1986, "Dear Billy" centers on Max Mayfield's mental struggles, and her attempt to survive Vecna's preying. The episode received universal acclaim and was noted as a standout of the season. Praise was directed at the performances, visual effects, cinematography and emotional impact. Particular praise went to Max's storyline and Sadie Sink's performance, the use of Kate Bush's "Running Up That Hill" during the episode's climax, and the themes of depression and suicide. Critics also praised the guest appearance of Robert Englund as well as Dichter's writing and Levy's directing, the latter most notably for a long take sequence.

== Plot ==
After Eleven accepts Sam Owens' offer to retrieve her powers again, Owens sends Agents Stinson, Harmon, and Wallace to inform Mike Wheeler, Will Byers and Jonathan Byers that, while Eleven will complete her training, they are confined to the Byers home in Lenora Hills, California, with Harmon and Wallace providing guard.

Meanwhile, in Hawkins, Indiana, Max Mayfield informs her friends that she fears Vecna is targeting her as his next victim. While Dustin Henderson, Lucas Sinclair, and Steve Harrington accompany Max as she writes and delivers goodbye letters for her friends and loved ones, Nancy Wheeler and Robin Buckley pose as university students to interview Victor Creel at Pennhurst Asylum. At Pennhurst, they discover that the Creels experienced supernatural occurrences and illusions at their home, with the horrors culminating in Victor's wife and children being murdered and his subsequent arrest. Nancy and Robin also discover that music was key to Victor's survival.

Elsewhere, Joyce Byers and Murray Bauman land in Alaska, where they deliver the ransom payment to Antonov's contact Yuri in exchange for Jim Hopper's release. But he drugs them, planning to turn them, along with Hopper and Antonov, over to the Russians for a larger profit. In Russia, Hopper escapes the prison camp but is soon recaptured.

Back in Lenora Hills, Mike and Will reaffirm their friendship as they and Jonathan begin plotting an escape back to Hawkins in order to warn their friends of what's happening. Yet, their plans are derailed when armed soldiers attack the Byers home, injuring Wallace, while Harmon protects them. With the help of Jonathan's friend Argyle, Mike, Will, and Jonathan escape, bringing a wounded Harmon with them.

After Max suffers another vision while speaking with her mother, she visits Billy Hargrove's grave to read her letter for him. She is soon possessed by Vecna, eventually finding herself at an altar within his mind. Steve, Dustin, and Lucas attempt to awaken her but to no avail. Nancy and Robin tell them that playing music breaks Vecna's control, and they play Max's favorite song, "Running Up That Hill", on Max's cassette player. This opens a portal within Max's mind, and after she recalls happy memories of her friends, Max is able to run toward the portal, narrowly escaping Vecna.

== Production ==
"Dear Billy" was written by Paul Dichter and directed by Shawn Levy.

Unlike the first and second seasons of Stranger Things, where the production chose any songs they liked, since the third season they had started being more careful with which songs they chose as they knew the impact they could have culturally due to the show's popularity, ending up going for Kate Bush's song "Running Up That Hill".

Dacre Montgomery filmed his cameo appearance as Billy Hargrove from his hometown in Perth, Australia as he was unable to film with the rest of the cast due to the travel restrictions imposed during the COVID-19 pandemic, counting with the assistance of a local crew, makeup artists and Levy's direction through a Zoom call.

For the scene when Nancy Wheeler and Robin Buckley visit the Pennhurst Mental Hospital, Emmy Awards-nominated makeup artist Amy L. Forsythe and artist Devin Morales originally discussed with actresses Natalia Dyer and Maya Hawke how would their characters look in an attempt to age themselves up. It was originally scripted for them to look "hotter", but that version of the script went away in favour of the pair dressing more academically, so the makeup team and the actresses tried to find a "happy balance" for the characters to appear older and academic but not as if they were modern and who their actresses are on their Instagram photos, all while not being used to see the characters dressed that way and being careful to keep things appropriate to the period and color-palette with the applications not perfect to the point of looking "glam and Instagram-y".

== Release ==
"Dear Billy" was released on May 27, 2022, on Netflix, alongside the six other episodes comprising Stranger Things season four volume one.

=== Reception ===
On the review aggregate site Rotten Tomatoes, the episode holds an approval rating of 100% based on 5 reviews, with an average rating of 9.0/10. Netflix submitted the episode in seven categories at the 74th Primetime Emmy Awards. It was nominated for four awards, Single-Camera Picture Editing for a Drama Series, Music Supervision, Prosthetic Makeup, and Stunt Performance. It won two Emmys, one in Music Supervision and one in Prosthetic Makeup.

The episode was included in many publications' list of best TV episodes of 2022. British GQ ranked it the second best episode of the year, Mashable SEA placed it at number five, TV Guide put it at number nine, and Mashable named it the 11th best, while Entertainment Weekly included it in its unranked list of "The 33 best TV episodes of 2022". The episode was nominated for the Hugo Award for Best Dramatic Presentation, Short Form.

The use of Kate Bush's "Running Up That Hill" during the episode's climax revived the popularity of the track, which topped the UK Singles Chart, and in a number of other countries: Australia, Belgium, Ireland, Lithuania, Luxembourg, New Zealand, and Sweden.
