= Stranger Things: Soundtrack from the Netflix Series, Season 5 =

Soundtrack album to fifth season of Stranger Things

Soundtrack album by various artists
- Released: November 28, 2025 (Vol. 1); December 26, 2025 (Vol. 2); January 1, 2026 (Vol. 3)
- Genre: Soundtrack
- Length: 25:24 (Vol. 1); 31:26 (Vol. 2); 48:43 (Vol. 3)
- Label: Legacy Recordings

Stranger Things: Soundtrack from the Netflix Series, Season 5 is the non-original composition soundtrack companion to the fifth and final season of the Netflix series Stranger Things. Consisting of 14 popular period songs, it was released by Legacy Recordings in three parts, corresponding to the release of each of the season's three segments.

== Release ==
Like the series, the album was also split into three volumes to coincide with the premiere. Vol. 1 which featured eight songs as heard in the season, was released on November 28, 2025, two days after its premiere. Vol. 2 featured the contents of the previous album, along with two other songs was released on December 26, 2025, while Vol. 3 which featured the contents of the previous two volumes and four other new songs was released on January 1, 2026. The album was further issued in CDs, LPs and cassettes on January 30, 2026.

== Track listing ==
Stranger Things: Soundtrack from the Netflix Series, Season 5
No.	Title	Performer(s)	Length
1.	"Rockin' Robin"	Michael Jackson	2:31
2.	"I Think We're Alone Now"	Tiffany	3:47
3.	"Fernando"	ABBA	4:12
4.	"Mr. Sandman"	The Chordettes	2:22
5.	"Pretty in Pink"	The Psychedelic Furs	3:58
6.	"Heroes"	David Bowie	6:10
7.	"The Trooper"	Iron Maiden	4:11
8.	"Here Comes Your Man"	Pixies	3:22
9.	"Sh-Boom"	The Chords	2:24
10.	"Oh Yeah"	Yello	3:04
11.	"Human Cannonball"	Butthole Surfers	3:50
12.	"Heart and Soul"	Floyd Cramer	2:12
13.	"Sweet Jane"	Cowboy Junkies	3:34
14.	"To Each His Own"	Freddy Martin and His Orchestra	3:06
Total length:			48:43

== Commercial performance ==
Since the release of the album in conjunction with the premiere, two songs—Diana Ross' "Upside Down" and Tiffany's "I Think We're Alone Now"—saw more than 1000% surges on Spotify. Despite not being included in the soundtrack album, "Upside Down" saw a 510% increase in global streams and 3,538% increase in global searches, while "I Think We're Alone Now" saw a 490% boost in global streams and 1,288% increase in global searches during the week after the season's premiere. Both songs emerged popular among the Generation Z audiences. Other songs, such as The Chordettes' "Mr. Sandman" (1954) and ABBA's "Fernando" (1976) saw a respective 625% and 335% increase in global streams, and a respective 1,030% and 1,110% increase in global searches, with massive popularity among the audiences. This was attributed to the season's massive viewership spike since the premiere. The album sold 21,000 copies in the United States for the week ending February 5, 2026, according to Billboard.

== Chart performance ==
Weekly chart performance for Stranger Things: Soundtrack from the Netflix Series, Season 5
Chart (2026)	Peak position
Austrian Albums (Ö3 Austria)	5
Belgian Albums (Ultratop Flanders)	3
Belgian Albums (Ultratop Wallonia)	1
German Albums (Offizielle Top 100)	4
Dutch Albums (Album Top 100)	10
Swiss Albums (Schweizer Hitparade)	4
UK Compilation Albums (OCC)	2
UK Album Downloads (OCC)	91
UK Soundtrack Albums (OCC)	1
UK Vinyl Albums (OCC)	3
US Billboard 200	32
US Top Rock Albums (Billboard)	5
US Top Rock & Alternative Albums (Billboard)	6
US Top Album Sales (Billboard)	2
US Top Current Album Sales (Billboard)	5
US Top Indie Store Albums (Billboard)	8
US Top Soundtracks (Billboard)	2
US Top Vinyl Albums (Billboard)	1

== Release history ==
Release history and formats for Stranger Things: Music from the Netflix Original Series, Season 5
Date	Volume(s)	Format(s)	Label	Ref.
November 28, 2025	Vol. 1	Digital download; streaming	Legacy	
December 26, 2025	Vol. 2	Digital download; streaming	Legacy	
January 1, 2026	Vol. 3	Digital download; streaming	Legacy	
January 30, 2026	Complete	CD; LP; Cassette	Legacy	
