= Stranger Things 2 (soundtrack) =

Soundtrack album by Kyle Dixon and Michael Stein
- Released: October 20, 2017
- Genre: Electronic
- Length: 1:11:20
- Labels: Lakeshore; Invada
- Producers: Kyle Dixon; Michael Stein

Alternative cover
- Vinyl edition cover

The soundtrack album for the second season of the Netflix series Stranger Things, titled Stranger Things 2, was released digitally on October 20, 2017, via Lakeshore and Invada Records. Like the previous season, the soundtrack was composed by Kyle Dixon and Michael Stein of the electronic band Survive. The album was also released on physical formats such as CD, vinyl, and cassette in the year following the soundtrack's initial digital release.

== Composition ==
On the soundtrack's composition, Dixon and Stein together said that the score for the season introduces "new styles of composition, while still revisiting old themes when appropriate ... We've created new elements that are necessary to support the story, but still want to remain true to the sound of Season 1." The two had previously stated they've purchased new equipment as to allow further experimentation and diversification during the scoring process.

== Critical reception ==
The first track on the album, "Walkin' in Hawkins", was released early on October 12, 2017. Kevin Lozano of Pitchfork praised the track, calling it "bright and pleasant" yet "minimal and effective," and noted that the song's "precise sounds point to a refinement in their technique ... the romantic, reverential mood of the song makes it easy to picture the scene it might score: a gorgeous day in a small town, streets bathed in sunlight, kids pedaling on bicycles, and the horrors seemingly far, far away." Randall Colburn of Consequence of Sound found the "straightforward tune" carried "a wistful, appropriately autumnal vibe," while Elias Leight of Rolling Stone lauded the song as being "majestic" and "stately."

== Track listing ==
Stranger Things 2 – Standard version
| No. | Title | Length |
|---|---|---|
| 1. | "Walkin' in Hawkins" | 2:36 |
| 2. | "Home" | 1:50 |
| 3. | "Eulogy" | 3:40 |
| 4. | "On the Bus" | 2:04 |
| 5. | "Presumptuous" | 1:34 |
| 6. | "Eight Fifteen" | 1:25 |
| 7. | "The First Lie" | 1:14 |
| 8. | "Scars" | 1:43 |
| 9. | "I Can Save Them" | 1:54 |
| 10. | "Descent into the Rift" | 1:26 |
| 11. | "Chicago" | 2:54 |
| 12. | "Looking for a Way Out" | 1:37 |
| 13. | "Birth / Rescue" | 3:21 |
| 14. | "In the Woods" | 0:54 |
| 15. | "Digging" | 1:06 |
| 16. | "Symptoms" | 3:39 |
| 17. | "Eggo in the Snow" | 1:01 |
| 18. | "Soldiers" | 2:10 |
| 19. | "Choices" | 2:01 |
| 20. | "Never Tell" | 1:53 |
| 21. | "She Wants Me to Find Her" | 2:27 |
| 22. | "Shouldn't Have Lied" | 2:56 |
| 23. | "It's a Trap" | 2:57 |
| 24. | "Crib" | 2:27 |
| 25. | "The Return" | 3:21 |
| 26. | "Escape" | 1:42 |
| 27. | "We Go Out Tonight" | 2:15 |
| 28. | "Connect the Dots" | 1:20 |
| 29. | "The Hub" | 3:55 |
| 30. | "On Edge" | 1:17 |
| 31. | "What Else Did You See?" | 1:23 |
| 32. | "Run" | 1:20 |
| 33. | "Levitation" | 2:08 |
| 34. | "To Be Continued" | 2:08 |
| Total length: | | 1:11:20 |

Stranger Things 2 – iTunes version (bonus tracks)
| No. | Title | Length |
|---|---|---|
| 1. | "Turn on the Lights" | 1:44 |
| 2. | "Sick of Cow" | 4:03 |
| 3. | "Power Maintenance" | 1:31 |
| 4. | "Roars from the Lab" | 2:33 |
| 5. | "Mercy" | 4:04 |
| 6. | "Shadow in the Tunnel" | 4:20 |
| 7. | "A Familiar Shape" | 6:50 |
| 8. | "Tree Slime" | 1:10 |
| 9. | "Do You Accept the Risk?" | 0:26 |
| 10. | "Entering the Cellar" | 2:05 |
| 11. | "The Spy" | 4:49 |
| 12. | "Controlled Contamination" | 1:45 |
| 13. | "Turn Right & Run" | 7:12 |
| 14. | "They Hurt Me" | 5:03 |
| 15. | "Possessed" | 3:11 |

== Charts ==
In the United States, the album sold 6,000 units in its first week of release.

| Chart (2017) | Peak position |
|---|---|
| Belgian Albums (Ultratop Flanders) | 184 |
| US Billboard 200 | 128 |
