= Stranger Things: Music from the Netflix Original Series =

Soundtrack album by Various artists
- Released: October 27, 2017
- Genres: Electronic score; soundtrack
- Length: 1:17:46
- Label: Legacy Recordings

Stranger Things: Music from the Netflix Original Series is the non-original composition soundtrack companion to the second season of the Netflix series Stranger Things. The album, which intersperses popular '80s songs with clips from the first and second seasons, was released on October 27, 2017, by Legacy Recordings to coincide with the release of the second season. The album was nominated for Best Compilation Soundtrack for Visual Media at the 61st Annual Grammy Awards, but lost to the soundtrack album for the film The Greatest Showman.

== Track listing ==
No.	Title	Performer(s)	Length
1.	"Introduction: Will Singing The Clash" (Dialogue)	Noah Schnapp	0:27
2.	"Every Breath You Take"	The Police	4:12
3.	"Should I Stay or Should I Go"	The Clash	3:06
4.	"Coffee and contemplation" (Dialogue)	David Harbour	0:09
5.	"Hazy Shade of Winter"	The Bangles	2:45
6.	"Nocturnal Me"	Echo and the Bunnymen	4:55
7.	"Bring him home!" (Dialogue)	Winona Ryder	0:07
8.	"Sunglasses at Night"	Corey Hart	3:54
9.	"Girls on Film"	Duran Duran	3:29
10.	"Just because people tell you..." (Dialogue)	Charlie Heaton	0:04
11.	"Atmosphere"	Joy Division	4:08
12.	"Maybe I'm crazy..." (Dialogue)	Winona Ryder	0:11
13.	"Twist of Fate"	Olivia Newton-John	3:37
14.	"Says logic" (Dialogue)	Finn Wolfhard, Gaten Matarazzo	0:06
15.	"The Ghost in You"	The Psychedelic Furs	4:16
16.	"Africa"	Toto	4:56
17.	"You Don't Mess Around with Jim"	Jim Croce	2:59
18.	"Accident or not" (Dialogue)	Gaten Matarazzo, Caleb McLaughlin	0:13
19.	"Whip It"	Devo	2:39
20.	"Runaway"	Bon Jovi	3:51
21.	"Time After Time"	Cyndi Lauper	3:57
22.	"Talking in Your Sleep"	The Romantics	3:56
23.	"Mouthbreather" (Dialogue)	Finn Wolfhard, Millie Bobby Brown	0:22
24.	"Back to Nature"	Fad Gadget	5:48
25.	"She's our friend and she's crazy!" (Dialogue)	Gaten Matarazzo	0:04
26.	"Rock You Like a Hurricane"	Scorpions	4:14
27.	"Heroes" (David Bowie cover)	Peter Gabriel	4:03
28.	"Friends don't lie" (Dialogue)	Millie Bobby Brown	0:04
29.	"Elegia"	New Order	4:55
30.	"Outro: Will Singing The Clash" (Dialogue)	Noah Schnapp	0:15
Total length:			1:17:46

== Charts ==
Chart (2017)	Peak position
Belgian Albums (Ultratop Flanders)	110
Belgian Albums (Ultratop Wallonia)	121
German Albums (Offizielle Top 100)	56
UK Soundtrack Albums (OCC)	23
US Digital Albums (Billboard)	24
US Top Soundtracks (Billboard)	10
