= Lionel Job =

Lionel E. Job (born January 23, 1942) is an American music producer, publisher, lyricist, and songwriter based in White Plains, New York. His music career dates back fifty-six years. Job is widely known for writing and producing for Keith Sweat, Joe Public, Starpoint, Walter Beasley, Sharon Bryant, Atlantic Starr, The Detroit Spinners, and Third World.

== Selected career highlights ==
In 1977, Job worked in the professional department as creative director of R&B for the Famous Music, the music publishing wing of Paramount Pictures since 1929, and by extension, the music publishing arm of its parent company, Gulf and Western. Simultaneously, Job was the founder, leader, manager, and producer of Southroad Connection, a disco-funk studio group. Before joining Famous music, Job had been a prolific promoter for Chas. H. Hansen Music Corp., a large music publisher. As a producer and writer, Job collaborated with Preston Glass (Starpoint),
