= Vuk Stojanovic =

Vuk Stojanovic is a Canadian film producer and cinematographer based in Quebec.

He has also had small parts as an actor, including in the films Tadoussac and Evergreen$ (Sapin$).

== Filmography ==
- Midi - 2008, producer
- ReMorseLess - 2010, cinematographer
- Score - 2011, producer
- Welcome Yankee - 2012, cinematographer
- L'odeur après la pluie - 2016, producer
- Dr. Diaz - 2017, producer and cinematographer
- Pow-Wow - 2018, producer
- Ziva Postec: The Editor Behind the Film Shoah (Ziva Postec : La monteuse derrière le film Shoah) - 2018, line producer
- A Moon of Nickel and Ice (Sur la lune de nickel) - 2017, producer and cinematographer
- Dolls Don't Die (Les poupées ne meurent pas) - 2019, producer
- Gamma Rays (Les Rayons gammma) - 2023, producer
- Billy - 2024, producer

== Awards ==
Award	Date of ceremony	Category	Work	Result	Ref.
Canadian Screen Awards	2018	Best Feature Length Documentary	A Moon of Nickel and Ice (Sur la lune de nickel) with Christine Falco, François Jacob	Nominated	
Canadian Screen Awards	2018	Best Cinematography in a Documentary	A Moon of Nickel and Ice (Sur la lune de nickel) with François Jacob, Ilya Zima	Nominated	
Canadian Screen Awards	2025	Best Motion Picture	Gamma Rays (Les Rayons gammma) with Henry Bernadet, Jean-Martin Gagnon	Nominated	
Prix Iris	2018	Best Documentary Film	A Moon of Nickel and Ice (Sur la lune de nickel) with Christine Falco, François Jacob	Nominated	
Prix Iris	2018	Best Cinematography in a Documentary	A Moon of Nickel and Ice (Sur la lune de nickel) with François Jacob, Ilya Zima	Nominated	
