= Isabelle Brouillette =

Canadian film and television actor (born 1969)

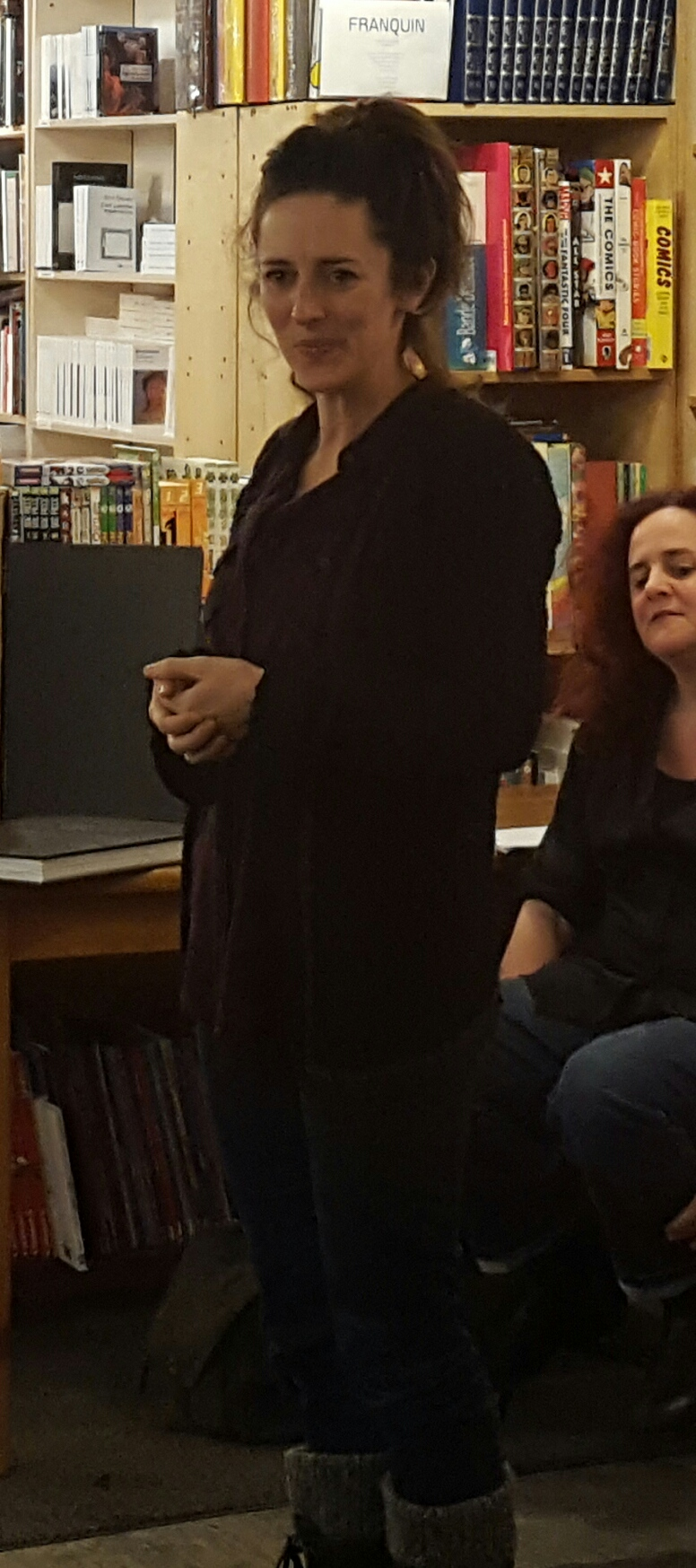
- Born: April 20, 1969 (age 57)
- Occupations: Actor, screenwriter
- Years active: 1990s–present

Isabelle Brouillette (born April 20, 1969) is a Canadian actress and screenwriter from Quebec. She is most noted as a co-writer, with Henry Bernadet and Nicolas Krief, of the 2023 film Gamma Rays (Les Rayons gammma), for which they received a nomination for Best Original Screenplay at the 13th Canadian Screen Awards in 2025.

She previously wrote for États-humains, an anthology television series she co-created with Réal Bossé, Salomé Corbo, Daniel Desputeau, Sylvie Moreau and François Papineau and has also authored children's books in collaboration with Édith Cochrane.

Her daughter, Lula Brouillette-Lucien, whose father is actor Didier Lucien, is also an actress; she had her first major role alongside her father in the 2024 television series Indéfendable.

== Filmography ==
=== Film ===
Year	Title	Role	Notes
1994	Chili's Blues (C'était le 12 du 12 et Chili avait les blues)	Snackbar waitress	
2000	The Bottle (La Bouteille)	Isabelle	
2001	Ice Cream, Chocolate and Other Consolations (Crème glacée, chocolat et autres consolations)	Suzie	
2005	Le petit renne aux névroses		
2009	Through the Mist (Dédé, à travers les brumes)	Lise Raymond	
2009	Naissances		
2010	Aurelie Laflamme's Diary (Le Journal d'Aurélie Laflamme)		
2010	Le fleuve à droite		
2010	L'Épitaphe	Brigitte	
2013	Joséphine, ou Chat échaudé craint l'eau froide	Joséphine	
2015	Puisqu'il le faut		
2015	The Magnificent Life Underwater (La vie magnifique sous l'eau)		
2023	When Adam Changes (Adam change lentement)	Ange/Gizèle	
2021	My Very Own Circus (Mon cirque à moi)	Lawyer	
2023	Gamma Rays (Les Rayons gammma)		Writer only
2025	Two Women (Deux femmes en or)	Pénélope	

=== Television ===
Year	Title	Role	Notes
1998–2000	Zone de turbulence		
2000	Chartrand et Simonne	Young married woman	One episode
2001	Catherine	Mélanie	
2001–2003	Ayoye!	Navette Bacon	
2001–2004	Réal TV	Darie	
2002–2003	Max Inc.	Julie	
2002	KM/H	Marie-Lune	
2003	Le Plateau	Mireille	
2003–2009	450, Chemin du Golf	Julie	Two episodes
2005	Les Bougon, c'est aussi ça la vie!	Mme Gamache	One episode
2005	Cover Girl	Chantal Meunier	Two episodes
2005	Les 4 Coins	Multiple roles	
2005–2009	Les États-Humains	Multiple roles	
2007–2014	Destinées	Élizabeth Pellerin	One episode
2009	Les Boys	Dr. Robert	One episode
2010	Il était une fois dans le trouble	Professor	
2010	Ni plus ni moi	Martine Fortin	
2010–2011	Rock et Rolland	Martine	
2010–2011	Toute la vérité	Teacher	Five episodes
2011	Zieuter.TV	Isabella	
2011–2016	Mirador	Mme Alexandra	Five episodes
2013	Et si?	Multiple roles	
2015	30 vies	Layla's mother	
2016	Camping de l'ours	Mother Nature	
2016	Unité 9	Patricia Joly	One episode
2017-	L'Échappée	Esther Sauvé	
2018	District 31	Danielle Vachon	Six episodes
2019–2020	Can You Hear Me? (M'entends tu?)	Bianca	Ten episodes
2020	Blood & Treasure	Dr Russo	One episode
2020	Pour toujours plus un jour	Karine	27 episodes
2020	La Maison-Bleue	Maude Guzzo	Two episodes
2021	Way Over Me (Sortez-moi de moi)	Carole Lussier	
2021	Reasonable Doubt (Doute raisonnable)	Myriam Nantel	One episode
2021–2022	Alertes	Solène Gagné	Five episodes
2021–2024	Nuit blanche	Carole Hébert	14 episodes
2022	De pierre en fille	Mylène	One episode
2023	Un gars, une fille	Emergency room doctor	One episode
2022–2023	Stat	Julie Faubert	27 episodes
2025	Libre dès maintenant	Manon	Three episodes
