= List of The Listener episodes =

The Listener is a Canadian science fiction drama set in Toronto about a young paramedic named Toby Logan (Craig Olejnik) with the ability to hear people's most intimate thoughts. The series was created by Michael Amo and is produced by Shaftesbury Films for CTV and Fox International Channels. The pilot episode was directed by Clement Virgo. NBC aired the program as a Summer series in 2009 but was dissatisfied with its ratings.

It was announced on November 17, 2009 that The Listener had been renewed for a 13 episode second season. Production for the second season began almost a year after the announcement of the renewal, in September 2010, and was scheduled to end February 2011. The second season premiered February 8, 2011 on CTV and after 10 episodes CTV began broadcasting the entire show from the beginning. The remaining three episodes were eventually shown in August 2011. In the UK, all thirteen episodes ran from March 1, 2011 to May 24, 2011. It was announced on June 1, 2011 that The Listener had been renewed for a 13-episode third season. On October 4, 2011, it was announced that production on season three was under-way and was to conclude in February 2012 and that ION Television had acquired rights to the first two seasons for broadcast in the U.S. in 2012. After such success with the first two seasons, ION Television began to air Seasons 3, 4 and 5. The program was popular enough on ION that the network broadcast all available episodes and became partners with Shaftesbury, CTV, and Fox International in the production of the series. According to an ION press release, the program has averaged over 1 million viewers per episode in the USA since the network began broadcasting it. Although the shows ratings in Canada were higher in 2014 than in previous years, on August 6, 2014 CTV announced that The Listener would conclude on August 18, 2014 with its final 65th episode.

== Series overview ==
Season	Episodes	Originally released	
Season	Episodes	First released	Last released
1	13	March 3, 2009	May 26, 2009
2	13	February 8, 2011	August 31, 2011
3	13	May 30, 2012	September 12, 2012
4	13	May 29, 2013	August 28, 2013
5	13	May 26, 2014	August 18, 2014

== Episodes ==
=== Season 1 (2009) ===
No. overall	No. in season	Title	Directed by	Written by	CAN. air date	Fox International air date
1	1	"I'm an Adult Now"	Clement Virgo	Michael Amo	June 3, 2009	March 3, 2009
Toby Logan is a 28-year-old paramedic, living in downtown Toronto. Until now, Toby has kept his powers to read people's thoughts and have visions a secret. This ability becomes very useful for his daily life, but the only person who knows his secret is his long-time friend and mentor Dr. Ray Mercer. After rescuing a young woman from a fiery car crash, Toby is troubled by visions of her missing son. She is traumatized and frightened by her abduction at gunpoint, so Toby is unable to get her to share any information. And as his own fears for the child's well-being increase, he realizes he's going to have to act quickly to make sense of the mental dissonance that plagues him. Solving the mystery, Toby realizes his ability is not a curse, but a "gift".
2	2	"Emotional Rescue"	Ken Girotti	Russ Cochrane	June 4, 2009	March 10, 2009
After receiving telepathic visions of an explosion, Toby saves his former foster brother, Vince Pirell, from an apartment fire. But with a reputation as a tweaker and cooker of crystal meth, the victim becomes the suspect. Toby is convinced Vince is telling the truth and becomes determined to track down the arsonist responsible. He just doesn't realize that he will fall under suspicion when Detective Charlene 'Charlie' Marks informs him that the fires look like the work of an emergency responder with a god complex. Kyle Elson's "victim's resources" had a list of bad people needed to get justice.
3	3	"A Voice in the Dark"	Clement Virgo	Michael Amo	June 11, 2009	March 17, 2009
After bumping into a young homeless man, Toby is plagued by visions of a missing girl. Certain she's been abducted, he pursues the homeless person for insights into her whereabouts. But he gets more than he bargained for, including the distinct feeling that the homeless person might share his psychic abilities. The emotional overload inspires him to try and salvage his failed relationship with Dr. Olivia Fawcett. Unfortunately, he's unable to quiet the visions and must act quickly if there's any hope of saving the young girl. The next day, Toby reveals his telepathy to his EMT partner Oz, who promises to keep it secret.
4	4	"Some Kind of Love"	Clement Virgo	Larry Lalonde & Phil Bedard	June 18, 2009	March 24, 2009
It looks like Toby might just get lucky when things take a tragic turn. After hooking up at a nightclub with Mina -- a beautiful pathologist -- she is later found dead. Initially fingered as a suspect in her death, Toby does some "listening" to find the real murderer. But just when it seems he may have found the truth, he discovers that Mina may have uncovered a conspiracy within the coroner's office.
5	5	"Lisa Says"	Kari Skogland	Dennis Heaton	July 2, 2009	March 31, 2009
Logan -- while on duty -- comes across a teenage boy, Daniel, being attacked in the street by other teenagers. Refusing treatment at the hospital, Daniel disappears. Searching the streets, Logan finds Daniel mixed up with street gangs, drugs and the supposed murder of a young girl named Lisa Greyson -- and Daniel has to be found before he is murdered too. Realizing later that the girl is missing and that Daniel has secrets of his own, Toby and Detective Charlie Marks must discover the truth of the situation, which comes as shock to Lisa's mother.
6	6	"Foggy Notion"	Clement Virgo	Jeremy Boxen	July 9, 2009	April 7, 2009
After attending a fatal shooting in Chinatown, Toby finds himself helping Kim Chu, the blind sister of one of the victims. In an effort to help her find out who killed her brother, Toby discovers a cover-up involving a Chinese crime boss who has been lying to police. As he collects telepathic thoughts and sorts through them, he realizes that Kim's brother was involved in human smuggling. They must act quickly before more lives are lost. In the final scene, Charlie makes Toby confirm that he knows what she thinks.
7	7	"Iris"	Stephen Surjik	Michael Amo	July 16, 2009	April 14, 2009
Toby and Oz are called to a hotel after a baby falls from a window. Before they have a chance to act, a mysterious teenage girl named Iris places her hands over the baby and revives him. When Toby catches up with Iris at the hotel, he gets a telepathic hit that makes him think someone might be trying to harm her. Toby's investigation reveals Iris' 'gift' may not be the faith-healing power everyone has come to know her for, but something equally amazing.
8	8	"One Way or Another"	Stephen Surjik	Dennis Heaton	July 23, 2009	April 21, 2009
When Toby and Oz are called to the scene of a sexual assault. Toby, reading the victim's memories, sees a white-masked attacker. Toby reports this clue to Charlie Marks who, upon interviewing the victim, fears a suspected serial rapist might be responsible. Charlie is convinced it is Brian Litvack, but has no conclusive evidence placing him at the crime scene. Her detective-sergeant superior warns her to back off. Undeterred, she continues to investigate with Toby and discovers that although the most recent attack carries the signature of previous assaults, the attacker is not the likely suspect.
9	9	"Inside the Man"	Clement Virgo	Michael Amo	July 30, 2009	April 28, 2009
Toby and Oz are called to a crime scene, only to discover two victims -- Wade and Wendy Lassiter -- lying in a pool of blood. Toby senses someone else is present, and their teenage son, Andy Lassiter, is discovered, hiding and barely alive. Toby is overwhelmed with thoughts and voices, unsure exactly what they mean. With two deceased parents and the only witness unable to speak, Charlie asks for Toby's help to use his telepathic ability to explore Andy's mind. Their investigation reveals Andy may possibly suffer from a rare and puzzling mental condition. Charlie and Toby use this unusual circumstance to find out who may be responsible for the death of Andy's parents. Sibling rivalry reconvenes for Olivia when her aggravating sister, Jennifer, arrives in town, and Olivia asks Toby and Oz to help provide a distancing barrier between them.
10	10	"Missing"	TJ Scott	Avrum Jacobson	August 6, 2009	May 5, 2009
While dining out, Toby and Olivia discover that Oz works a second job at his parents' restaurant. Oz informs them his parents are behind on their mortgage payments and have 14 days to come up with $100,000 or they will lose everything. Aware of Toby's telepathic gift, Oz suggests Toby use it to help earn the money. After losing at a high-stakes poker game, Olivia tips Toby and Oz about a $100,000 reward for a dead missing person, Katie Stebbes, who disappeared after her husband Arthur took out a $5 million insurance policy on her. Currently serving prison time for allegedly murdering Katie, Arthur has maintained his innocence, claiming someone else set him up. With his telepathic gift and investigative resources, Toby believes he can solve Arthur's case and find his wife's body.
11	11	"Beginning to See the Light"	Clement Virgo	Story by : Travis McDonald; Teleplay by : Avrum Jacobson	August 13, 2009	May 12, 2009
Toby and Oz attend an accident scene to find a victim, Ron, suffering from a head injury. Attempting to find out what happened, Toby reads his mind and sees an image of a beautiful young woman. Upon loading Ron on a stretcher, a handgun falls from the man's coat, along with a photo of a woman – the same woman in Toby's telepathic read. Ron loses consciousness and dies. With the help of Oz, Toby tracks down the woman, who turns out to be the victim's daughter, Lindsay. Lindsay asks if her father's death has anything to do with the four million dollars he stole. Toby goes to see Charlie but ends up encountering Becker instead and reveals his thoughts concerning Ron's death. Examining a fifteen-year-old case, Charlie and Becker hope Lindsay can provide some insight into the missing money. Toby, Charlie and Lindsay discover Ron might not have stolen the missing cash after all – but that someone else close to him did.
12	12	"The 13th Juror / My Sister's Keeper"	Kari Skogland	Ross Cochrane	August 20, 2009	May 19, 2009
Toby and Oz's paramedic skills are called into question when, while trying to save a victim's life, they trample on a crime scene and compromise the evidence. Toby is able to read the thoughts of those giving testimony, including the victim's sister, who claims the accused, a record producer, was responsible for her sister's death. While Toby isn't convinced the victim's sister is telling everything she knows, he gets a telepathic hit from someone sitting in the courtroom gallery. Toby discovers the victim was being watched the night of the murder, and that an eyewitness could be the only hope of finding out what happened and who was responsible. Toby and Oz pick up a John Doe, whom Olivia diagnoses with Alzheimer's disease. Toby is unable to read John Doe's mind for clues to help determine his identity. But he is shocked when he discovers the man may hold a piece of the puzzle to Toby's own mysterious past.
13	13	"The Journey"	Clement Virgo	Michael Amo	August 27, 2009	May 26, 2009
Toby takes Ray to the hospital to meet John Doe, whom Ray recognizes as Frank Cardea, the man who brought Toby to Ray 20 years earlier. Due to his Alzheimer's, Frank continues to have trouble remembering, but he does tell Toby that Maya, Toby's mother, sent him. Toby is hit with a distress beacon, catching glimpses of a smashed windshield and a mysterious man, and attempts to learn more about the images in Frank's mind. When Olivia and Oz inform Toby about the mysterious man appearing at the hospital and EMS station, followed by a break-in at Ray's office and the disappearance of Toby's case files, Toby enlists Charlie's assistance. While protecting Toby from the mysterious man, Charlie receives a fatal gunshot wound. With the man still in pursuit, Toby races to decipher Frank's memories and uncover the truth about his mother.

=== Season 2 (2011) ===
No. overall	No. in season	Title	Directed by	Written by	CAN. air date	Fox International air date
14	1	"Lady in the Lake"	Kari Skogland	Ben Sokolowski	February 8, 2011	March 1, 2011
After coming to terms with the murder of Detective Marks and the disappearance of his mother, Toby decides to help when a woman is found on a Lake Ontario beach suffering from amnesia and helps her to retrace her steps, discovering she was the victim of a murder attempt by a mining company. But she is also wanted by the IIB - Integrated Investigative Bureau (a special unit of the Royal Canadian Mounted Police) for murder.
15	2	"Crime Seen"	Charles Binamé	Jason Sherman	February 15, 2011	March 8, 2011
When Sergeant McCluskey believes an undercover cop has been exposed, she asks Toby, whose past she had been looking into and his involvement with Det. Charlie Marks killed 18 months before, to help discover if her man is in danger from the gun runners he had infiltrated. This leads to Toby revealing his ability to read minds to the doubting McCluskey. When the undercover officer is wounded, only Toby can help find clues to the identities and whereabouts of the gun runners.
16	3	"In His Sights"	Charles Binamé	Wil Zmak	February 22, 2011	March 15, 2011
Employed by the I.I.B as a "Confidential Informant", Toby is asked to help in finding a possible assassin who wants to kill one of the Conservative party leadership candidates. From the thoughts Toby is able to read, they lead to a cover-up of civilian deaths in Afghanistan.
17	4	"The Brothers Volkov"	Kari Skogland	Jason Sherman & Jocelyn Cornforth	March 8, 2011	March 22, 2011
Toby assists Sgt. McCluskey when Dmitry Volkov confesses to killing his father, Fyodor, a Russian diplomat. He is defended by his lawyer brother Yuri, claiming diplomatic immunity, but the truth lies by looking into the mind of the third brother, Pavel, an autistic boy who lives in his own world of a model railway.
18	5	"Inner Circle"	Kari Skogland	Matt MacLennan	March 15, 2011	March 29, 2011
A joint IIB and Metro police drug investigation has been failing and suspicion falls on two undercover Anti-Gang unit cops. Sgt. McCluskey asks Toby to help her figure out who is dirty in the undercover Metro Police, but things get complicated when one of the undercover cops dies from a suspicious drug overdose and his fellow officers and family close ranks.
19	6	"The Magician"	Clement Virgo	Wil Zmak	March 22, 2011	April 5, 2011
Magnus, a prisoner known as 'The Magician' because of his brilliant mind, demands to see Sgt. McCluskey, who had arrested him six years before as a cadet. Magnus engages in a psychological battle of misinformation about the forthcoming kidnapping of a judge that conceals his motives involving the murder of a female student a year after he entered prison, and Toby is unable to read his mind as easily as Magnus can seemingly read his.
20	7	"Ace in the Hole"	Kari Skogland	Cal Coons	April 1, 2011	April 12, 2011
A clumsy cover-up of the murder of a CSIS (Canadian Intelligence) agent who had access to American classified intelligence leads to a high-stakes poker game when the information will be passed on. Sgt. McCluskey needs help from her estranged husband, Adam, with Toby as the back up "ace in the hole" to infiltrate the game.
21	8	"Vanished"	Clement Virgo	Shernold Edwards	April 8, 2011	April 19, 2011
When a wealthy widower businessman's baby is kidnapped outside St. Luke's hospital, the only witness is a psychic artist who is in communication with the baby's dead mother. Toby convinces a skeptical Sgt. McCluskey to take the artist seriously when investigating a revenge kidnapping with one of the kidnappers having close ties to the father.
22	9	"Jericho"	Farhad Mann	Lisa Steele	April 15, 2011	April 26, 2011
Toby helps Sgt. McCluskey during a cyber-crime investigation when Corporal Dev Clarke intercepts a hacker carrying ten thousand blank credit cards. This leads to the mysterious world of hackers and "Jericho 11," a man or machine behind an impenetrable firewall, a plot to steal 14 million social insurance numbers from Revenue Canada, and the death of a man named Joshua.
23	10	"Desperate Hours"	Clement Virgo	Daegan Fryklind	April 22, 2011	May 3, 2011
Toby and Oz are dispatched to a routine call for a broken ankle that turns out to be a serious gunshot wound. Taken hostage by a couple demanding they perform surgery on the man they allegedly shot by accident, who was the organizer of a Ponzi scheme. They need him alive to get back the money he had swindled from them. When the man dies, only Toby's ability to have read the man's mind can keep himself and Oz alive.
24	11	"To Die For"	Charles Binamé	Jason Sherman	August 17, 2011	May 10, 2011
When one of four partners in a restaurant used for money laundering is murdered, one partner--a famous chef de cuisine--accuses another partner, a mob boss, of the killing and is placed on witness protection. Toby is employed to confirm the accusation which seems genuine, but to determine the truth, the chef is allowed to cook a meal at the restaurant where the killing took place with the fourth partner and second chef, Magda, who were also present at the time of the murder.
25	12	"Eye of the Storm"	Clement Virgo	Peter Mitchell	August 24, 2011	May 17, 2011
The IIB are investigating a hacker releasing classified documents to the internet and the impending major release of thousands of documents, when a sex tape of the foreign affairs minister--the main opponent of freedom of information--is released. Toby is tasked with finding the male escort in the videotape and who employed him to discredit the minister, and find the person leaking the documents to the hacker.
26	13	"Reckoning"	Kari Skogland	Story by : Jason Sherman; Teleplay by : Cal Coons	August 31, 2011	May 24, 2011
Toby connects with a gifted young woman, whose family was killed when she was eight, with mental powers that surpass his by including manipulation of a person's conscience -- including Sgt. McCluskey's and his own. She was close by to a series of suspicious suicides linked to an old biker gang with a leader with no conscience. How can justice be served?

=== Season 3 (2012) ===
No. overall	No. in season	Title	Directed by	Written by	CAN. air date	Fox International air date
27	1	"The Bank Job"	Farhad Mann	Peter Mohan	May 30, 2012	June 4, 2012
Despite his decision to take a break from using his telepathic abilities, Toby is forced to use them when he's taken hostage during a bank robbery. In order to help him, Michelle reveals his secret to her boss, Alvin Klein.
28	2	"Cold Case Blues"	Paul Fox	Cal Coons	June 6, 2012	June 10, 2012
Working his first official investigation, Toby must contend with Alvin Klein's skepticism and personal agenda in solving a decade-old murder.
29	3	"Curtain Call"	Farhad Mann	James Hurst	June 13, 2012	TBA
When the life of superstar performer Jade (Fefe Dobson) is threatened, Toby poses as her assistant to protect her and help the Special Ops unit investigate. Meanwhile, Toby lets Oz stay with him while his apartment is cleaned due to a leaking roof.
30	4	"The Taking"	Paul Fox	Ken Cuperus	June 20, 2012	TBA
Toby helps the IIB investigate the abduction of an African teenager, whose father is an alleged war criminal. Meanwhile, Oz decides to take the supervisor's exam, but Ryder does not take him seriously.
31	5	"Rogues' Gallery"	Peter Stebbings	Wil Zmak	June 27, 2012	TBA
Toby uses his telepathy as surveillance when Michelle goes undercover to bust a violent art theft ring.
32	6	"She Sells Sanctuary"	Kari Skogland	Karen Walton	July 11, 2012	TBA
Toby and Michelle investigate the link between a cult and the disappearance of three young women.
33	7	"Poisoned Minds"	Cal Coons	Derek Schreyer	July 18, 2012	TBA
Toby and Michelle investigate the death of a pharmaceutical executive who released a drug with deadly results. Meanwhile, Sandy's return throws Oz's love life in turmoil.
34	8	"Now You See Him"	Rob Lieberman	James Hurst	July 25, 2012	TBA
When Magnus Elphrenson escapes prison again, Toby must help Michelle recapture him before the criminal mastermind seeks vengeance on his nemesis. Meanwhile, Ryder assigns himself to be Oz's partner for a shift, to the latter's chagrin.
35	9	"Crossed"	Charles Binamé	Karen Walton	August 15, 2012	TBA
Toby starts doubting his abilities after Michelle questions the veracity of his insights during their investigation into a wealthy philanthropist's murder.
36	10	"Lockdown"	Stefan Pleszczynski	Peter Mohan	August 22, 2012	TBA
Toby and the IIB race against time to track the source of a deadly virus before the outbreak claims any more lives, including a stricken Dr. Olivia Fawcett.
37	11	"Captain Nightfall"	John L'Ecuyer	Ken Cuperus	August 29, 2012	TBA
Toby and Michelle investigate a series of violent home invasions, which are being interrupted by a vigilante citizen dressed as a superhero.
38	12	"The Bro Code"	Robert Lieberman	Peter Mohan & Ken Cuperus	September 5, 2012	TBA
Oz unwittingly puts his life in danger after he convinces Toby to help a childhood friend who witnessed a murder.
39	13	"The Shooting"	Stefan Pleszczynski	James Hurst & Karen Walton	September 12, 2012	TBA
With Michelle's career on the line, Toby and the IIB must prove she was set up after a bad tip led to the shooting of a suspect.

=== Season 4 (2013) ===
No. overall	No. in season	Title	Directed by	Written by	Original release date
40	1	"Blast from the Past"	Rob Lieberman	Peter Mohan	May 29, 2013
A series of high tech thefts in Vancouver are investigated by Toby and IIB. Also Toby's relationship grows with crime reporter Tia Tremblay, the one person he can't read. Meanwhile, Oz realizes that being the boss as the new director of emergency services is harder than he expected.
41	2	"The Blue Line"	Rob Lieberman	Peter Mohan	June 5, 2013
Toby and IIB have to deal with a gang of robbers who are armed with lethal and high powered bullets, as well as dealing with the added pressure of a new demanding police superintendent.
42	3	"Early Checkout"	Peter Stebbings	Cal Coons	June 12, 2013
When crime reporter Tia's colleague is targeted by a hotel owner, Toby pushes IIB to investigate.
43	4	"Cold Storage"	Farhad Mann	Avrum Jacobson	June 19, 2013
After a body is found in a storage locker filled with stolen goods, Toby and IIB must find the killer who may have taken national defence secrets.
44	5	"Buckle Up"	Brad Walsh	Brendon Yorke	June 26, 2013
Toby has to go undercover to nab a group of thieves posing as police officers.
45	6	"Witness for the Prosecution"	Farhad Mann	James Hurst	July 10, 2013
A key witness in a mob trial is shot. Toby and Michelle must contend with a suspicious FBI agent as they unravel a potential conspiracy linked to the original killing and retaliation.
46	7	"Caged In"	Clement Virgo	Lara Azzopardi	July 17, 2013
Toby witnesses the suspicious death of a promising, young MMA fighter and he enters into the nefarious business dealings of two rival leagues to investigate.
47	8	"The Illustrated Woman"	Paul Fox	Scott Oleszkowicz	July 24, 2013
Toby's investigation into the murder of a tattooed woman leads him to believe that corporate espionage and blackmail are behind the killing. Toby reveals to Tia his telepathic gift.
48	9	"Love's a Bitch"	Peter Stebbings	Peter Mitchell	July 31, 2013
The murder of a British spy may be linked to an adulterous dating site.
49	10	"The Long Con"	Keith Samples	James Hurst	August 7, 2013
Toby and Michelle team up with a con artist to catch a human trafficker.
50	11	"House of Horror"	Harvey Crossland	Ken Cuperus	August 14, 2013
Toby and IIB investigate the murder of an actor while filming an alleged cursed horror movie.
51	12	"False I.D."	Cal Coons	Brendon Yorke	August 21, 2013
The new police superintendent interferes with the capture of a murder suspect. Toby shoots and kills his first criminal.
52	13	"Fatal Vision"	Brad Walsh	Peter Mohan	August 28, 2013
Toby struggles with post-traumatic stress disorder from the shooting, complicated further by mentally experiencing the shooting from the suspect's point of view. Meanwhile, the team works to stop the assassination of a visiting French politician.

=== Season 5 (2014) ===
No. overall	No. in season	Title	Directed by	Written by	Original release date
53	1	"The Wrong Man"	Bradley Walsh	Peter Mohan	May 26, 2014
A serial killer imitates a past murderer that Michelle caught three years prior. Although on maternity leave, Michelle must return to the IIB in order save her reputation and her career. Toby and Tia move in together, while Oz buys a restaurant. After finding the new killer, Klein is offered a promotion to Interpol.
54	2	"The Lockup"	Bradley Walsh	Michelle Ricci	June 2, 2014
Det. Sgt. Brian Becker becomes the new head of the team and his animosity towards Toby jeopardizes the success they have just achieved, while the team has to investigate the theft of money from a gang bust from the Metro police's evidence locker. Oz proposes to Sandy they move in together, but she turns him down and they break up.
55	3	"Dancing With The Enemy"	TW Peacocke	Lara Azzopardi	June 9, 2014
The team investigates the abduction of a ballerina whom Tia was going to interview for information that could ruin the dance company, directed by her husband, but the case gets complicated quickly. Becker is puzzled by Toby's methods. Oz takes a leave of absence from the hospital to concentrate in the restaurant and to avoid Sandy.
56	4	"Smoke and Mirrors"	TW Peacocke	James Hurst	June 16, 2014
A magic act goes horribly wrong when an investment guru is killed; Through his own investigation and critical thinking Becker figures out Toby's telepathic gift; Becker scrutinizes Toby.
57	5	"Game Over"	Bradley Walsh	Ken Cuperus	June 23, 2014
On the Eve of his new video game release, Dev's former friend is murdered. Toby and the team investigate the world of gaming.
58	6	"Man in the Mirror"	Bradley Walsh	Ken Cuperus	June 30, 2014
A psychiatrist is murdered, leaving Toby to deal with a mentally unstable suspect.
59	7	"Amuse Bouche"	Peter Stebbings	Jackie May	July 7, 2014
A cooking-show contestant is poisoned on live TV.
60	8	"White Whale"	Don McCutcheon	Jackie May	July 14, 2014
A mayoral candidate is suspected of murder; Becker becomes obsessed with Toby's gift.
61	9	"The Fugitive"	Don McCutcheon	Brendon Yorke	July 21, 2014
Oz's neighbor is murdered, and the investigation reveals that the victim was involved in a legendary coin heist.
62	10	"Family Secrets"	Peter Stebbings	Lara Azzopardi	July 28, 2014
The team must contend with a series of secrets when investigating the death of a billionaire playboy. Meanwhile, Tia wants to learn about Toby's family and his past.
63	11	"Zero Recall"	James Dunnison	James Hurst	August 4, 2014
Toby experiences memory loss after being drugged and is accused of participating in an armed-kidnapping incident.
64	12	"An Innocent Man"	Harvey Crossland	James Hurst & Jackie May & Lara Azzopardi	August 11, 2014
Toby goes undercover in prison when a man with no criminal record walks into court and confesses to having murdered a man.
65	13	"In Our Midst"	Peter Stebbings	Peter Mohan	August 18, 2014
A judge and the Deputy Commissioner ask Toby, Michelle and Dev to look into Becker, who may be involved in criminal activity. Tia starts up again in investigating Toby's past and disappearance of his mother. Driven by her reporter's impulse to get to the truth, she goes behind Toby's back and uses IIB's computer to track his mother. At the end of the episode, Toby's mother appears at his house, and the two get reacquainted.

== Canadian / U.S. ratings ==
=== Season 1: 2009 ===
#	Title	Canada			United States				
#	Title	Viewers (millions)	Weekly Rank	Note	Air date	Rating/Share (households)	Rating/Share (18–49)	Viewers (millions)	Note
1	"I'm an Adult"	1.074	10		June 4, 2009	3.7/6	N/A	5.315	
2	"Emotional Rescue"	1.000	14		June 4, 2009	3.7/6	N/A	5.315	
3	"A Voice in the Dark"	0.983	15		June 11, 2009	3.0/5	N/A	4.443	
4	"Some Kind of Love"	1.079	6		June 18, 2009	2.7/5	0.9/3	3.832	
5	"Lisa Says"	0.798	16		July 2, 2009	2.2/4	0.9/3	3.30	
6	"Foggy Notion"	0.793	23		July 9, 2009	2.2/4	0.7/2	3.24	
7	"Iris"	0.871	19		July 16, 2009	2.3/4	1.1/4	3.87	
8	"One Way or Another"	0.937	12		July 23, 2009	2.4/4	0.9/3	3.44	
9	"Inside the Man"	N/A	N/A		N/A	N/A	N/A	N/A	N/A
10	"Missing"	0.875	15		N/A	N/A	N/A	N/A	
11	"Beginning to See the Light"	0.894	9		N/A	N/A	N/A	N/A	
12	"The 13th Juror"	0.739	19		N/A	N/A	N/A	N/A	
13	"The Journey"	0.843	19		N/A	N/A	N/A	N/A	

=== Season 2: 2011 ===
#	Title	Canada		
#	Title	Viewers (millions)	Weekly Rank	Note
14	"Lady in the Lake"	0.812	N/A	
15	"Crime Seen"	0.884	N/A	
16	"In His Sights"	0.861	N/A	
17	"The Brothers Volkov"	"close to 1.1"	N/A	
18	"Inner Circle"	"close to 1"	N/A	
19	"The Magician"	0.996	N/A	
20	"Ace in the Hole"	0.851	N/A	
21	"Vanished"	0.996	N/A	
22	"Jericho"	0.940	N/A	
23	"Desperate Hours"	0.873	N/A	
24	"To Die For"	0.595	N/A	
25	"Eye of the Storm"	0.876	28	
26	"Reckoning"	0.940	22	

=== Season 3: 2012 ===
#	Title	Canada		
#	Title	Viewers (millions)	Weekly Rank	Note
27	"The Bank Job"	1.090	12	
28	"Cold Case Blues"	1.018	16	
29	"Curtain Call"	0.988	18	
30	"The Taking"	1.149	11	
31	"Rogues' Gallery"	0.864	25	
32	"She Sells Sanctuary"	0.971	15	
33	"Poisoned Minds"	0.812	29	
34	"Now You See Him"	0.882	28	
35	"Crossed"	1.099	18	
36	"Lockdown"	1.042	19	
37	"Captain Nightfall"	1.073	18	
38	"The Bro Code"	0.948	20	
39	"The Shooting"	1.076	16	

=== Season 4: 2013 ===
#	Title	Canada		
#	Title	Viewers (millions)	Weekly Rank	Note
40	"Blast from the Past"	0.951	17	
41	"The Blue Line"	0.845	19	
42	"Early Checkout"	0.936	19	
43	"Cold Storage"	0.929	20	
44	"Buckle Up"	0.708	26	
45	"Witness for the Prosecution"	0.947	17	
46	"Caged In"	0.841	25	
47	"The Illustrated Woman"	0.925	20	
48	"Love's a Bitch"	0.977	18	
49	"The Long Con"	1.172	11	
50	"House of Horror"	1.090	16	
51	"False I.D."	1.163	12	
52	"Fatal Vision"	1.050	14	

==== Season 5: 2014 ====
#	Title	Canada		
#	Title	Viewers (millions)	Weekly Rank	Note
53	"The Wrong Man"	0.957	18	
54	"The Lockup"	0.928	18	
55	"Dancing With The Enemy"	0.961	17	
56	"Smoke and Mirrors"	1.075	11	
57	"Game Over"	1.163	12	
58	"Man in the Mirror"	1.097	13	
59	"Amuse Bouche"	1.114	15	
60	"White Whale"	1.055	17	
61	"The Fugitive"	1.139	15	
