= Gamma Rays (film) =

- French: Les rayons gamma
- Directed by: Henry Bernadet
- Written by: Henry Bernadet; Nicolas Krief; Isabelle Brouillette
- Produced by: Vuk Stojanovic; Henry Bernadet; Jean-Martin Gagnon
- Starring: Yassine Jabrane; Chaïmaa Zineddine Elidrissi; Océane Garçon-Gravel; Chris Kanyembuga; Hani Laroum
- Cinematography: Philémon Crête; Natan B. Foisy; Philippe St-Gelais
- Edited by: Jules Saulnier
- Music by: Maxime Veilleux; Mathieu Charbonneau; Simon Trottier
- Production company: Coop Vidéo de Montréal
- Distributed by: Les Films Opale
- Release date: September 28, 2023 (SSIFF)
- Running time: 101 minutes
- Country: Canada
- Language: French

Gamma Rays (French: Les rayons gamma) is a Canadian comedy-drama film, written and directed by Henry Bernadet and released in 2023. Made with a cast of non-professional actors, the film centres on three interconnected stories about young immigrants in the Villeray–Saint-Michel–Parc-Extension district of Montreal, Quebec.

The stories centre on Abdel (Yassine Jabrane), whose cousin Omar (Hani Laroum) comes to visit but sparks a crisis when he gets lost after Abdel sends him out on his own without accompaniment despite Omar's lack of familiarity with the city; Fatima (Chaïmaa Zineddine Elidrissi), who is working as a supermarket cashier and trying to deal with an unpaid debt to a drug dealer; and Toussaint (Chris Kanyembuga), an intelligent but introverted young man who is drawn out of his shell when he finds a message in a bottle while fishing.

== Production and distribution ==
The film was Bernadet's solo directorial debut, following television credits and the 2008 film West of Pluto (À l'ouest de Pluton) which he codirected with Myriam Verreault. To cast the film's leading roles, he sought out amateur actors at Georges-Vanier secondary school in Villeray.

It premiered at the 71st San Sebastián International Film Festival in September 2023, before going into limited commercial release in Quebec in November.

== Awards ==
Award	Date of ceremony	Category	Recipient(s)	Result	Ref.
Prix collégial du cinéma québécois	2024	Best Film	Henry Bernadet	Nominated	
Prix Iris	December 8, 2024	Revelation of the Year	Chaïmaa Zineddine Elidrissi	Nominated	
Prix Iris	December 8, 2024	Best Casting	Henry Bernadet, Marie-Anne Sergerie, Victor Tremblay-Blouin	Nominated	
Canadian Screen Awards	2025	Best Picture	Henry Bernadet, Vuk Stojanovic, Jean-Martin Gagnon	Nominated	
Canadian Screen Awards	2025	Best Director	Henry Bernadet	Nominated	
Canadian Screen Awards	2025	Best Lead Performance in a Drama Film	Chaïmaa Zineddine Elidrissi	Nominated	
Canadian Screen Awards	2025	Best Original Screenplay	Henry Bernadet, Isabelle Brouillette, Nicolas Krief	Nominated	
Slamdance Film Festival	2025	Narrative Feature Grand Jury Prize	Henry Bernadet	Won	
