= 19-2 (2014 TV series) =

Canadian television series

- Genre: Police procedural; Action; Crime drama
- Based on: 19-2 by Réal Bossé; Claude Legault
- Developed by: Bruce M. Smith
- Starring: Adrian Holmes; Jared Keeso; Benz Antoine; Mylène Dinh-Robic; Laurence Leboeuf; Dan Petronijevic; Conrad Pla; Bruce Ramsay; Sarah Allen; Victor Cornfoot; Tyler Hynes; Maxim Roy; Richard Chevolleau; Lisa Berry; Tattiawna Jones; Alexander De Jordy; Krista Bridges; Joe Pingue; Darcy Laurie
- Composer: Nicolas Maranda
- Country of origin: Canada
- Original language: English
- No. of seasons: 4
- No. of episodes: 38

Production
- Executive producers: Greg Phillips; Saralo MacGregor; Carolyn Newman; Bruce M. Smith; Luc Châtelain; Jocelyn Deschênes; Virginia Rankin; Josée Vallée
- Production locations: Montreal, Quebec, Canada
- Running time: 42–45 minutes
- Production companies: Sphere Media; Echo Media; Bell Media

Original release
- Network: Bravo (2014–16); CTV (2017)
- Release: January 29, 2014 – September 18, 2017

19-2 is a Canadian police procedural crime drama television series developed by Bruce M. Smith, based on the French-language series of the same name created by Réal Bossé and Claude Legault. It was produced by Sphere Media and Echo Media, in association with Bell Media; Smith served as showrunner. The series premiered on Bravo in Canada on January 29, 2014, and aired for three seasons, before it moved to CTV for its fourth and final season. It finished its four-year run on September 18, 2017, with 38 episodes.

Set in Montreal, 19-2 follows the professional and personal lives of patrol officers from the Montreal Police Service's Station 19, which covers an inner-city area of the city. The series' name comes from the callsign of the patrol car of the two main characters. (Note: According to the SPVM Montreal Police site, they have 33 stations, none of which are currently numbered 19. The 2001 Annual Report showed that the former SPCUM Montreal Police had a station 19 covering the downtown east side and Plateau Mont-Royal.) Adrian Holmes and Jared Keeso star as Nick Barron and Ben Chartier. The two are joined by principal cast members Benz Antoine, Mylène Dinh-Robic, Laurence Leboeuf, Dan Petronijevic, Conrad Pla, Bruce Ramsay, Sarah Allen, Victor Cornfoot, Tyler Hynes and Maxim Roy, with Richard Chevolleau, Lisa Berry, Tattiawna Jones, Alexander De Jordy, Krista Bridges, Joe Pingue, and Darcy Laurie joining them in later seasons.

19-2 has received positive reviews from critics, with particular praise for its characterization, pacing, writing, and acting. The series has been nominated for 37 Canadian Screen Awards, winning five, including Best Dramatic Series and Best Performance by an Actor for both Holmes and Keeso, and was also nominated for Best Drama Series at the 44th International Emmy Awards.

== Series overview ==
Nick Barron and his partner Jean-Pierre Harvey are shot responding to a burglary. While Barron is spared by his body armour, Harvey is shot in the head and left hospitalized for life. Replacing Harvey is Ben Chartier, a veteran constable from the Sûreté du Québec (SQ), who transferred to Montreal to escape troubles in his hometown. As officers from Station 19 deal with the challenges of police work, they struggle with their challenges as well. Chartier is estranged from his family after he personally arrests his own father for drunk driving. Barron struggles with his continuing feelings for his estranged wife, colleague Detective Isabelle Latendresse. Tyler Joseph struggles with alcoholism. Jean-Marc Brouillard abuses his wife. Commander Marcel Gendron struggles to protect the station's image in the face of pressure from the public and his superiors alike. By the end of the first season, Chartier's former employer, the SQ, assigns him to find a mole within the station.

The second season begins with Barron and Chartier responding to reports of a snake at a daycare centre. Chartier encounters an armed civilian: Barron's cousin Cassius Clemont. Barron's unsavoury relationship with Clemont makes Barron the prime suspect of the SQ's investigation into the mole in 19. When Chartier brings Barron into the investigation, Barron and Clemont burgle a suspect's house and make a rash decision that endangers both of them. The third season starts in the aftermath of the mole's suicide. The reputation of Station 19 has been destroyed by the revelation of the mole, along with other incidents such as the arrest of Brouillard for domestic violence. Cassie Clemont is discovered dead, having been brutally tortured for days. Barron and Chartier must deal with the fallout of Barron's actions, as the station is scrutinized by an inspector from Internal Affairs.

The series features a fourth season that was not based on the 2011 French version and is completely original, containing 8 additional episodes.

== Cast and characters ==
=== Main ===
- Adrian Holmes as Nick Barron
- Jared Keeso as Ben Chartier
- Benz Antoine as Tyler "Big Dog" Joseph
- Mylène Dinh-Robic as Beatrice "Bear" Hamelin
- Laurence Leboeuf as Audrey Pouliot
- Dan Petronijevic as Jean-Marc "J.M." Brouillard
- Conrad Pla as Julien Houle (seasons 1–2; guest seasons 3–4)
- Bruce Ramsay as Marcel Gendron
- Sarah Allen as Catherine Lariviere (season 1; guest season 2)
- Victor Cornfoot as Jean-Pierre Harvey (season 1; guest seasons 2 & 4)
- Tyler Hynes as Vince Legare (seasons 1–2)
- Maxim Roy as Isabelle Latendresse (seasons 1–2; guest seasons 3–4)
- Richard Chevolleau as Cassius "Kaz" Clemont (season 2; guest seasons 3–4)
- Lisa Berry as Rita George (season 2; guest season 3)
- Tattiawna Jones as Amelie de Grace (seasons 2–3; recurring season 1; guest season 4)
- Alexander De Jordy as Richard Dulac (seasons 3–4; guest season 2)
- Krista Bridges as Elise Roberge (season 3; guest season 4)
- Joe Pingue as Charlie Figo (season 3)
- Darcy Laurie as Roy Suarez (season 4; recurring season 3)

=== Recurring ===
- Zackaryer Abdillahi as Theo Barron
- Andreas Apergis as Dispatcher (voice)
- Catherine Bérubé as Laura
- Mark Camacho as Dougas
- Juliette Gosselin as Martine
- Danny Blanco Hall as Girard
- Jayne Heitmeyer as Marie
- Paul Hopkins as Jim Bouchard
- Vincent Leclerc as Anthony Tremblay
- Anthony Lemke as Dan Malloy
- Spiro Malandrakis as Frank Ferney
- Margot Claire Mustos as Sandrine
- Neil Napier as Jerry Lowe
- Aiza Ntibarikure as Roxanne Dionne (season 4)
- Alexandra Ordolis as Justine
- Leni Parker as Pilcher
- Jennifer Seguin as Dispatcher (voice)
- Sagine Sémajuste as Farah Miller
- Linda Smith as Ben's mom
- Jaa Smith-Johnson as Christos
- Christian Tessier as Marc Chartier
- Vlasta Vrana as Ben's father

== Episodes ==
| Season | Episodes | Originally released | | |
| Season | Episodes | First released | Last released | Network |
|---|---|---|---|---|
| 1 | 10 | January 29, 2014 | April 2, 2014 | Bravo |
| 2 | 10 | January 19, 2015 | March 23, 2015 | Bravo |
| 3 | 10 | June 20, 2016 | August 22, 2016 | Bravo |
| 4 | 8 | July 31, 2017 | September 18, 2017 | CTV |

=== Season 1 (2014) ===
| No. overall | No. in season | Title | Directed by | Adapted by (Note: Adapted from the French-language series of the same name written by Joanne Arseneau, Danielle Dansereau and Réal Bossé with the collaboration of Claude Legault.) | Original release date |
|---|---|---|---|---|---|
| 1 | 1 | "Partners" | Louis Choquette | Bruce M. Smith | January 29, 2014 |
Officer Nick Barron is back on the job after his partner was shot. Feeling guilty over the incident, he struggles to accept his new partner, Ben Chartier, who has transferred from a rural police unit. Their new partnership is put to the test when a suspect is shot during a robbery and the officer who shot him is placed under investigation for using excessive force.
| 2 | 2 | "Deer" | Louis Choquette | Bruce M. Smith | February 5, 2014 |
Barron and Chartier clash when they disagree about whether to report a dangerous incident. Chartier is haunted by memories of an incident on the job that caused the fracture of his family's relationship. The verdict comes in on the shooting of a robbery suspect.
| 3 | 3 | "Welfare Day" | Louis Choquette | Bruce M. Smith | February 12, 2014 |
The team prepare themselves for a chaotic day as welfare cheques arrive.
| 4 | 4 | "The Party" | Louis Choquette | Bruce M. Smith | February 19, 2014 |
Tyler Joseph is hung over. Barron visits Jean-Pierre Harvey. A priest deals with a confessor.
| 5 | 5 | "Home" | Érik Canuel | Jesse McKeown | February 26, 2014 |
Chartier returns to Morin-Heights on a sick day to see Catherine Lariviere and his dad. Harvey is discharged. Barron and JM Brouillard do not work well together.
| 6 | 6 | "Turf" | Érik Canuel | Damon Vignale | March 5, 2014 |
Kids are left alone at home. Chartier gets frustrated with youth gang boldness. Barron visits his mom.
| 7 | 7 | "Lovers" | Érik Canuel | Jesse McKeown | March 12, 2014 |
Chartier goes on a date. Beatrice Hamelin's date does not go so well. Theo Barron gets in trouble. Tactical runs into big trouble.
| 8 | 8 | "Medals" | Louis Choquette | Jesse McKeown | March 19, 2014 |
Guys fight over Amelie de Grace, Barron's half-sister. Chartier and Barron make a big arrest. Joseph shows interest in AA. Audrey Pouliot will no longer hide her relationship.
| 9 | 9 | "Islands" | Louis Choquette | Esta Spalding | March 26, 2014 |
An officer is attacked. The commander faces a moral dilemma.
| 10 | 10 | "Winter" | Louis Choquette | Bruce M. Smith | April 2, 2014 |
An officer dies. The SQ gets more involved in 19. Barron reaches a breaking point.

=== Season 2 (2015) ===
| No. overall | No. in season | Title | Directed by | Written by | Original release date |
|---|---|---|---|---|---|
| 11 | 1 | "School" | Podz | Bruce M. Smith | January 19, 2015 |
After collecting an escaped snake, 19–2 gets dispatched to a local high school after a report of vandalism. When they arrive, they hear shots and find a trail of dead and injured students and teachers. Station 19 responds in force, with a cat and mouse hunt for the shooter through the school.
| 12 | 2 | "Disorder" | Louis Choquette | Jesse McKeown | January 26, 2015 |
After being crippled in an ambush in season one, Pouliot returns to duty. Vince Legare is in deep trouble after being seduced by a crime victim. Chartier must choose between loyalty to his partner and his duty as a police officer.
| 13 | 3 | "Borders" | Louis Choquette | Bruce M. Smith & Nikolijne Troubetzkoy | February 2, 2015 |
Pouliot loses her temper and is filmed brutalizing a local musician. Barron and Chartier make a disturbing discovery while looking for Commander Marcel Gendron's daughter.
| 14 | 4 | "Tribes" | Louis Choquette | Jesse McKeown | February 9, 2015 |
Brouillard betrays Legare as his career is put at stake. Barron and Chartier get in a scuffle with the local fire station. Tensions culminate and explode when the team goes paintballing.
| 15 | 5 | "Rock Garden" | Érik Canuel | Damon Vignale | February 16, 2015 |
Barron and Isabelle Latendresse's son, Theo, is implicated in the near-suicide of a teen girl. Brouillard loses his temper responding to a domestic abuse call.
| 16 | 6 | "Tables" | Érik Canuel | Bruce M. Smith | February 23, 2015 |
Chartier brings Barron into the SQ's investigation after another raid is botched by the mole.
| 17 | 7 | "Property Line" | Érik Canuel | Nikolijne Troubetzkoy | March 2, 2015 |
Station 19 is assigned to help local bailiffs evict tenants from a housing project. Barron and Cassie Clemont burgle a suspect's home in search of evidence. Joseph's newfound boldness leads to a dangerous accident.
| 18 | 8 | "Babylon" | Louis Choquette | Damon Vignale | March 9, 2015 |
As 19 breaks up a protest, Pouliot loses her temper once again putting her career in jeopardy. Joseph's fears put Hamelin in danger as protesters ambush her.
| 19 | 9 | "Orphans" | Louis Choquette | Jesse McKeown | March 16, 2015 |
Chartier is forced to cover up Barron and Clemont's burglary. A key witness points to a trusted figure at 19 as the mole.
| 20 | 10 | "Bridges" | Louis Choquette | Bruce M. Smith | March 23, 2015 |
Barron and Chartier hunt for the mole. Gendron realises a past mistake. Brouillard finally receives justice for his actions towards his wife.

=== Season 3 (2016) ===
| No. overall | No. in season | Title | Directed by | Written by | Original release date |
|---|---|---|---|---|---|
| 21 | 1 | "Burn Pile" | Sturla Gunnarsson | Bruce M. Smith | June 20, 2016 |
Homicide detectives confront Barron with the death of his cousin Clemont. New recruit Richard Dulac faces his first emergency call. Commander Gendron forces Detective Latendresse out of 19 to protect his own position.
| 22 | 2 | "Rescue" | Sturla Gunnarsson | Jesse McKeown | June 27, 2016 |
Barron searches for answers to his cousin's death. Joseph's alcoholism resurfaces in a destructive episode. Chartier builds his relationship with Barron's sister.
| 23 | 3 | "Chicken" | Sturla Gunnarsson | Nikolijne Troubetzkoy | July 4, 2016 |
Barron brings a new witness to the investigation of his cousin's death. Dulac is shot after Hamelin's gun is stolen by force. Homicide detectives threaten Chartier after they discover he has been feeding information to Barron.
| 24 | 4 | "Bitch" | Stefan Pleszczynski | Bruce M. Smith & Lynne Kamm | July 11, 2016 |
Following Dulac's shooting, Hamelin is demoted. Barron returns a favour for Internal Affairs. Barron and Chartier find themselves in trouble after confronting a shadowy figure.
| 25 | 5 | "Protest Pants" | Stefan Pleszczynski | Jesse McKeown | July 18, 2016 |
Brouillard returns to 19 and resumes his role as union representative as the province cuts public sector pensions. Chartier is forced to confront his family once again.
| 26 | 6 | "City" | Stefan Pleszczynski | Alison Lea Bingeman | July 25, 2016 |
Chartier's family situation continues to deteriorate as Barron continues to search for his cousin's killer.
| 27 | 7 | "Honeymoon" | Stefan Pleszczynski | Bruce M. Smith | August 1, 2016 |
Anti-police sentiment grows in light of a recent killing. Brouillard's turmoil comes to new heights.
| 28 | 8 | "Fall" | Louis Choquette | Nikolijne Troubetzkoy | August 8, 2016 |
Joseph intervenes in Chartier's family situation without asking. Barron's plans go into disarray with a heavy price to pay.
| 29 | 9 | "Gone" | Louis Choquette | Alison Lea Bingeman | August 15, 2016 |
Barron and Chartier are thrown into turmoil following the murder of a loved one.
| 30 | 10 | "Water" | Louis Choquette | Bruce M. Smith | August 22, 2016 |
Chartier reaches breaking point and escalates to violence. A traitor is revealed.

=== Season 4 (2017) ===
| No. overall | No. in season | Title | Directed by | Written by | Original release date |
|---|---|---|---|---|---|
| 31 | 1 | "Swimming" | Sturla Gunnarsson | Bruce M. Smith | July 31, 2017 |
Arrest warrants for Elise Roberge and several other crooked officers are issued. A restaurant bombing shakes the squad and has many collateral effects on Station 19.
| 32 | 2 | "Driveby" | Sturla Gunnarsson | Story by : Greg Nelson; Teleplay by : Lynne Kamm | August 7, 2017 |
Audrey tries to cope with the accident. Ben volunteers to help homicide with surveillance and makes a bad decision. A mobster's party in a local park is hit by a drive-by shooting when officers are present.
| 33 | 3 | "Fishbowl" | Sturla Gunnarsson | Nikolijne Troubetzkoy | August 14, 2017 |
J.M. goes over the edge with his firearm. A new officer, Roxanne Dionne, joins Station 19. Ben and Nick catch a rapist who, in short order, is released; Nick focuses on the perp's business to balance the scales of justice. 19-4 enforces a warrant that breaks up a family and endangers the children.
| 34 | 4 | "Labour Day" | Sturla Gunnarsson | Lynne Kamm | August 21, 2017 |
Audrey and Roxanne arrest a fake cop. A team building weekend for the squad at a cottage. Tyler find himself tested. Some deep discussions happen. Back in the city tragedy strikes.
| 35 | 5 | "Flowers" | Louis Choquette | Bruce M. Smith | August 28, 2017 |
The squad copes with the aftermath of the attack on Station 19 and attend J.M.'s funeral. Ben meets with Internal Affairs after being threatened. A shelter visit holds some surprises. Martine contacts Ben.
| 36 | 6 | "Sons" | Louis Choquette | Jackie May | September 4, 2017 |
Ben learns more about how much trouble he is in. Nick's burgeoning relationship turns complicated. Ben and Audrey deliver a heart to the hospital and Audrey watches the transplant. Martine gets dragged into Ben's problems.
| 37 | 7 | "Wake" | Louis Choquette | Nikolijne Troubetzkoy | September 11, 2017 |
Ben's troubles advance to an extreme level that puts everyone at risk, especially Martine. The department starts pushing back on organized crime. Audrey struggles on a solo patrol. Ben and Nick visit the high school for the first time since the school shooting.
| 38 | 8 | "Tomorrow" | Louis Choquette | Bruce M. Smith | September 18, 2017 |
A full moon keeps the station busy starting with a stolen snow plow. Ben gets an unusual present from his dad. Adrenaline flows as Station 19 races to catch a murderer before he strikes again. Sergeant promotions happen. The team has a BBQ on Ben's roof to wrap a good day. Nick hears from Farah Miller after he speaks with Antoine at Devon's hearing.

== Production ==
=== Development ===
In July 2012, CBC Television ordered a pilot for an English-language adaptation of the popular French-language television series 19-2 created by and starring Réal Bossé and Claude Legault, to be adapted by Bruce M. Smith and directed by Louis Choquette. CBC Television did not pick up the series for its 2013 season; instead, the adapted series was picked up by Bravo for a season of ten episodes in June 2013 at the Banff World Media Festival, with Smith serving as showrunner. The series was renewed for a second season in April 2014, a third in April 2015, and a fourth in May 2016. On September 23, 2016, Bell Media announced that the fourth season would be the show's final season. The series had a $500,000 per episode budget bump over the original series.

=== Casting ===
In August 2012, Adrian Holmes and Jared Keeso were cast as Nick Barron and Ben Chartier, respectively. In September 2013, Bravo announced that Benz Antoine would reprise his role as Tyler Joseph from the original series, with Maxim Roy, Laurence Leboeuf, Dan Petronijevic, Mylène Dinh-Robic, Conrad Pla, and Bruce Ramsay cast as Detective Isabelle Latendresse, Audrey Pouliot, J.M. Brouillard, Beatrice Hamelin, Sergeant Julien Houle, and District Commander Marcel Gendron, respectively. Additional cast include Sarah Allen as Catherine Lariviere, Victor Cornfoot as Jean-Pierre Harvey, and Tyler Hynes as Vince Legare. In July 2014, Richard Chevolleau and Lisa Berry joined the cast for the second season as Cassius "Kaz" Clemont and Rita George, respectively. Tattiawna Jones, who recurred as Amelie de Grace, throughout the first season, was subsequently promoted to the principal cast in the second season. In August 2015, Alexander De Jordy was announced to be cast as Richard Dulac, while Krista Bridges was announced as Inspector Elise Roberge, and Joe Pingue as Charlie Figo. Darcy Laurie joined the cast for the fourth season as Sergeant Roy Suarez.

=== Filming ===
Filming for the series took place in Montreal, primarily at a decommissioned police station. On the show filming in Montreal, executive producer Jocelyn Deschênes stated, "CBC said – 'We want to see Montreal'. They asked for it. Montreal hasn't been shown that much on English-Canadian TV and it's a very cinematic city. They really want us to show Montreal from angles that we've never seen." Production on the pilot took place at the end of September 2012, for ten days, while production on the remaining episodes began in September 2013, and concluded in December.

Production on the second season began in July 2014 until October. The season two premiere, "School", features an uninterrupted, 13-minute single-camera tracking shot of a school shooting, based on the 2006 Dawson College shooting in Montreal. Podz, director of the French-Canadian version of the show who had helmed the school-shooting episode in that series, was brought back to helm the episode of the English-Canadian adaptation. The scene, which was shot in the same school as the original, involved intense research and rehearsal, at least a half-dozen rooms, a two-storey building, roughly a hundred extras, and required thirteen takes. Production on the third season began in August 2015, while filming for the fourth and final season began in September 2016. Filming for the series ended in December 2016.

== Release ==
| Season | Episodes | Originally aired | | | | DVD release dates | |
| Season | Episodes | First aired | Last aired | Timeslot (EST) | Network | Region 1 | Region 2 |
|---|---|---|---|---|---|---|---|
| 1 | 10 | January 29, 2014 | April 2, 2014 | Wednesday 9:00 pm | Bravo | April 26, 2016 | September 21, 2015 |
| 2 | 10 | January 19, 2015 | March 23, 2015 | Monday 10:00 pm | Bravo | August 30, 2016 | November 30, 2015 |
| 3 | 10 | June 20, 2016 | August 22, 2016 | Monday 10:00 pm | Bravo | December 13, 2016 | —N/a |
| 4 | 8 | July 31, 2017 | September 18, 2017 | Monday 10:00 pm | CTV | November 7, 2017 | —N/a |

=== Broadcast ===
19-2 aired on Bravo in Canada, for its first three seasons, each consisting of 10 episodes, before it moved to CTV for its fourth and final season, consisting of eight episodes. The first season originally aired from January 29 to April 2, 2014, while the second season aired from January 19 to March 23, 2015. A third season premiered on June 20, 2016, concluding on August 22, and the fourth season premiered on July 31, 2017, and concluded on September 18.

Content Television & Digital bought the international distribution rights in January 2014. In the United States, the series began streaming on Acorn TV, with the first season premiering on January 18, 2016, the second on May 16, the third on October 24, and the fourth on September 22, 2017. In the United Kingdom, Season 1 premiered on Spike UK on July 15, 2015; and Season 2 on July 6, 2016. In Latin America distribution, Kew Media sold three seasons of the series to Grey Juice Lab in 2018, for broadcast rights in Chile, Argentina and the Dominican Republic.

=== Home media ===
The complete first season was first released on DVD in Region 1 on April 26, 2016, with the complete second season released on August 30, 2016, the complete third season released on December 13, 2016, and the complete fourth season was scheduled to be released on November 7, 2017. CraveTV has exclusive Canadian streaming rights to the series, with all episodes available on the video on demand service. New episodes of the fourth season were made available one day earlier, 10 p.m. on Sunday, than their original broadcast on CTV, beginning on July 30, 2017. Episodes of the first three seasons were available on Bravo.ca, and the Bravo GO app after their broadcast premiere.

== Reception ==
=== Audience viewership ===
The premiere episode of 19-2 was watched by 140,000 viewers, making it Bravo's most-watched premiere of an original Canadian series since The Borgias in 2011. Its conventional television debut aired on CTV the following day on January 30, 2014, and was watched by 872,000 viewers. The second episode was watched by a mere 76,000 viewers, which was attributed to many viewers who watched the premiere on CTV assuming the main network was its home. Due to this, Bell Media decided to air a second "special primetime" broadcast of the second episode on February 9, which led to a series-high for the show's third airing on Bravo, with 178,000 viewers tuning in. Regarding Bell Media's cross-platform promotion, Scott Henderson concluded, "It shows that the sampling works. It may have taken a few weeks to find the home, but now the series is doing well." After factoring DVR recordings, the second episode on Bravo was watched by a total of 150,000 viewers, up 96 percent from the preliminary data.

The first season finished as Bravo's number one new series of the 2014–15 television season, drawing an average of nearly 200,000 viewers per episode, and reaching a total of 3 million unique viewers. The second season grew its timeslot audience, 10 p.m. on Monday, by 54 percent compared to the same weeks in the previous year and over the course of the season reached a total of 2.5 million viewers.

=== Critical response ===
In a review for HuffPost Canada Denette Wilford wrote: "19-2 is not just your average procedural. It's a character-driven drama that follows two not-so-different men from very different worlds as they learn to work with one another. The acting is solid and organic, the pace is perfect, the writing is real and natural and believable, and the stories hit home." A.R. Wilson of Digital Journal also reviewed it positively saying, "Instead of depending on constant action sequences and endless doses of adrenaline, it spaces its major crimes out, patiently mining the aftermaths of these events for compelling storylines... It's realistically written, beautifully acted, and gorgeously shot in and around Montreal. Most of all, it's a keenly observed character drama that manages to make the cop show genre feel fresh by placing people over procedural."

Phil Harrison and Gwilym Mumford for The Guardian said "This Canadian series, set in Montréal's Precinct 19, boasts all the tropes of post-Shield police dramas: antiheroes, mavericks, shaky verité camerawork. Yet what 19-2 lacks in originality it makes up for in action from the off". The New York Times's Neil Genzlinger described the series as "a slow burn" and stated, "There are tropes in 19-2 – the police genre is too crowded for there not to be – but the writing is sublime, turning each episode into a sort of tone poem, a slice of urban and police life carefully observed. The series is in the tradition of shows like The Wire, portraying law enforcement less flashily and less noisily than others, and thus more accurately." Bill Brownstein of the Montreal Gazette said, "19-2 works so effectively because it grasps the reality of both conflicted cops and citizens in this city. Nothing is black and white here. Characters come in a variety of shades. All of which makes the chemistry between partners Barron and Chartier so credible and so captivating." Conversely, The Globe and Mail's John Doyle was more critical of the series, feeling "the set-up is as plain as a poke in your eye", noting "The series flirts with grimness but points to the timidity of Canadian drama at the moment – its limitations and inability to challenge and horrify as well as entertain. Both Adrian Holmes and Jared Keeso are fine, it's the material that is less soulful and nuanced than it seems."

Nancy deWolf Smith of The Wall Street Journal praised the season two premiere, "School", calling it "the most agonizingly realistic sequence imaginable of a mass shooting and the close-action chase after an active shooter." She added, "Something about the setting, and the differences – even subtle ones – in the way Canadians approach issues such as race, sex, gender and justice, also makes 19-2 exciting in a wholly new way." Wilford also applauded the season two opener and wrote, "Look, every hour of 19-2 is quality television and, at times, it can be a little too sombre. The premiere is like nothing you've ever seen, from the way it was shot, to every actor involved, to the subject matter... It's a powerful, compelling, exhausting hour – one that definitely should not be missed."

=== Accolades ===
| Year | Award | Category | Recipient(s) | Result | Ref. |
|---|---|---|---|---|---|
| 2014 | Canadian Cinema Editors Awards | Best Editing in Long Form Television Series | Teresa De Luca for "Deer" | Nominated | |
| 2015 | Canadian Screen Awards | Best Dramatic Series | 19-2 | Nominated | |
| 2015 | Canadian Screen Awards | Best Performance by an Actor in a Continuing Leading Dramatic Role | Jared Keeso | Won | |
| 2015 | Canadian Screen Awards | Best Performance by an Actor in a Featured Supporting Role in a Dramatic Program or Series | Benz Antoine | Nominated | |
| 2015 | Canadian Screen Awards | Best Performance by an Actor in a Featured Supporting Role in a Dramatic Program or Series | Dan Petronijevic | Nominated | |
| 2015 | Canadian Screen Awards | Best Performance by an Actress in a Featured Supporting Role in a Dramatic Program or Series | Laurence Leboeuf | Nominated | |
| 2015 | Canadian Screen Awards | Best Performance by an Actress in a Featured Supporting Role in a Dramatic Program or Series | Maxim Roy | Nominated | |
| 2015 | Canadian Screen Awards | Best Direction in a Dramatic Series | Érik Canuel for "Turf" | Nominated | |
| 2015 | Canadian Screen Awards | Best Writing in a Dramatic Series | Bruce M. Smith for "Partners" | Nominated | |
| 2015 | Canadian Screen Awards | Best Writing in a Dramatic Series | Esta Spalding for "Islands" | Nominated | |
| 2015 | Canadian Screen Awards | Best Picture Editing in a Dramatic Program or Series | Teresa De Luca for "Deer" | Nominated | |
| 2015 | ACTRA Montreal Awards | Outstanding Female Performance | Mylène Dinh-Robic | Nominated | |
| 2015 | ACTRA Montreal Awards | Outstanding Female Performance | Laurence Leboeuf | Nominated | |
| 2015 | Directors Guild of Canada | Best Direction – Television Series | Podz for "School" | Nominated | |
| 2015 | Directors Guild of Canada | Best Television Series – Drama | 19-2 | Nominated | |
| 2015 | Leo Awards | Best Dramatic Series | 19-2 | Nominated | |
| 2015 | Leo Awards | Best Screenwriting in a Dramatic Series | Jesse McKeown for "Lovers" | Nominated | |
| 2015 | Leo Awards | Best Lead Performance By a Male in a Dramatic Series | Jared Keeso | Nominated | |
| 2016 | Canadian Screen Awards | Best Dramatic Series | 19-2 | Won | |
| 2016 | Canadian Screen Awards | Best Performance by an Actor in a Continuing Leading Dramatic Role | Adrian Holmes | Nominated | |
| 2016 | Canadian Screen Awards | Best Performance by an Actor in a Continuing Leading Dramatic Role | Jared Keeso | Nominated | |
| 2016 | Canadian Screen Awards | Best Performance by an Actor in a Featured Supporting Role in a Dramatic Program or Series | Conrad Pla | Nominated | |
| 2016 | Canadian Screen Awards | Best Performance by an Actor in a Featured Supporting Role in a Dramatic Program or Series | Bruce Ramsay | Nominated | |
| 2016 | Canadian Screen Awards | Best Performance by an Actress in a Featured Supporting Role in a Dramatic Program or Series | Laurence Leboeuf | Nominated | |
| 2016 | Canadian Screen Awards | Best Direction in a Dramatic Series | Podz for "School" | Won | |
| 2016 | Canadian Screen Awards | Best Writing in a Dramatic Series | Nikolijne Troubetzkoy and Bruce M. Smith for "Borders" | Nominated | |
| 2016 | Canadian Screen Awards | Best Writing in a Dramatic Series | Jesse McKeown for "Orphans" | Nominated | |
| 2016 | Canadian Screen Awards | Best Achievement in Casting | Robin D. Cook, Andrea Kenyon, Randi Wells and Marissa Richmond for "School" | Won | |
| 2016 | Canadian Screen Awards | Best Sound in a Comedy or Dramatic Program or Series | Robert Labrosse, Guillaume Boursier, Martin M Messier, Sébastien Bédard, Lori Paquet, Sabin Hudon, Jacques Plante and Jean Camden for "School" | Nominated | |
| 2016 | Canadian Screen Awards | Best Picture Editing in a Dramatic Program or Series | Yvann Thibaudeau for "School" | Nominated | |
| 2016 | Writers Guild of Canada | Best Writing in a TV Drama | Jesse McKeown for "Orphans" | Nominated | |
| 2016 | Writers Guild of Canada | Best Writing in a TV Drama | Nikolijne Troubetzkoy for "Property Line" | Nominated | |
| 2016 | Writers Guild of Canada | Best Writing in a TV Drama | Bruce M. Smith for "School" | Nominated | |
| 2016 | Leo Awards | Best Dramatic Series | 19-2 | Nominated | |
| 2016 | Leo Awards | Best Screenwriting in a Dramatic Series | Jesse McKeown for "Orphans" | Won | |
| 2016 | Leo Awards | Best Lead Performance By a Male in a Dramatic Series | Jared Keeso | Won | |
| 2016 | International Emmy Awards | Best Drama Series | 19-2 | Nominated | |
| 2017 | Canadian Screen Awards | Best Dramatic Series | 19-2 | Nominated | |
| 2017 | Canadian Screen Awards | Best Performance by an Actor in a Continuing Leading Dramatic Role | Adrian Holmes | Won | |
| 2017 | Canadian Screen Awards | Best Performance by an Actor in a Featured Supporting Role in a Dramatic Program or Series | Dan Petronijevic | Nominated | |
| 2017 | Canadian Screen Awards | Best Direction in a Dramatic Series | Louis Choquette for "Water" | Nominated | |
| 2017 | Canadian Screen Awards | Best Writing in a Dramatic Series | Bruce M. Smith for "Water" | Nominated | |
| 2017 | Canadian Screen Awards | Best Sound in a Comedy or Dramatic Program or Series | Robert Labrosse, Jean Camden, Guillaume Boursier, Martin M Messier, Sebastien Bedard, Sabin Hudon and Jacques Plante for "Burn Pile" | Nominated | |
| 2017 | Canadian Screen Awards | Best Picture Editing in a Dramatic Program or Series | Arthur Tarnowski for "Burn Pile" | Nominated | |
| 2017 | Canadian Screen Awards | Best Photography in a Dramatic Program or Series | Tobie Marier Robitaille for "Rescue" | Nominated | |
| 2017 | Canadian Screen Awards | Best Original Music Score for a Series | Nicolas Maranda for "City" | Nominated | |
| 2017 | Writers Guild of Canada | Best Writing in a TV Drama | Nikolijne Troubetzkoy for "Fall" | Nominated | |
| 2017 | Leo Awards | Best Lead Performance By a Male in a Dramatic Series | Adrian Holmes | Nominated | |
| 2018 | Canadian Screen Awards | Best Dramatic Series | 19-2 | Nominated | |
| 2018 | Canadian Screen Awards | Best Supporting Actor, Drama | Benz Antoine | Nominated | |
| 2018 | Canadian Screen Awards | Best Supporting Actor, Drama | Dan Petronijevic | Nominated | |
| 2018 | Canadian Screen Awards | Best Picture Editing, Drama | Annie Ilkow for "Labour Day" | Nominated | |
| 2018 | Canadian Screen Awards | Best Photography, Drama | Ronald Plante for "Labour Day" | Nominated | |
| 2018 | Canadian Screen Awards | Best Achievement in Make-Up | Erik Gosselin and Edwina Voda for "Swimming" | Nominated | |
