= Chaïmaa Zineddine Elidrissi =

Chaïmaa Zineddine Elidrissi, sometimes credited as Chaïmaa Zineddine, is a Canadian actress from Montreal, Quebec. She is most noted for her performance in the film Gamma Rays (Les Rayons gamma), for which he received a Prix Iris nomination for Revelation of the Year at the 26th Quebec Cinema Awards.

A first-time actor, she was cast in the film after director Henry Bernadet sought out amateur actors at Georges-Vanier secondary school in the Montreal borough of Villeray.
