= Benz Antoine =

Canadian actor

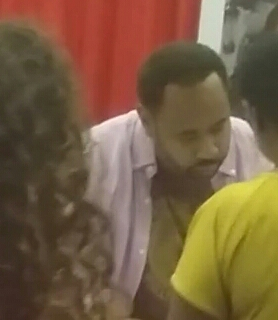
- Antoine in Montréal, Québec, Canada at the 2019 Montreal Comiccon.
- Born: Rubens Antoine; June 22, 1972 (age 53); Montreal, Quebec, Canada
- Occupation: Actor

Benz Antoine (born June 22, 1972) is a Canadian actor, of Haitian descent, who has made over 100 film and television appearances.

== Early life and education ==
Benz Antoine was born in 1972 in Montreal, Canada and is the oldest of the three children raised by his mother, Rose Marie. After graduating from high school, Benz enrolled at Concordia University.

== Career ==
Antoine has made over 100 film and television appearances. Antoine has provided the voice of the Haitian character Baptiste in Overwatch. He is best known for his appearances in Romeo Must Die, Death Race, Get Rich or Die Tryin', Four Brothers, and I'm Not There. He also earned critical acclaim for his gripping portrayal of alcoholic cop Tyler Joseph in both the original French version and the English adaptation of 19-2.

== Filmography ==
=== Film ===
Year	Title	Role	Notes
1997	Dead Innocent	Beaman	
1999	Both Sides of the Law	Adam Anderson	
2000	Romeo Must Die	Crabman	
2000	Sanctimony	Bouncer	
2001	Heist	Trooper at Cargo Hangar	
2001	Life in the Balance	Policeman at Accident Scene	
2002	Aftermath	Police Officer	
2002	Spooky House	Police Officer	
2002	Steal	Policeman	
2003	Gothika	Guard	
2005	Guy X	Philly	
2005	Four Brothers	Police Sergeant	
2005	Get Rich or Die Tryin'	Ray Wilmore	
2007	Talk to Me	Bar Patron 3	
2007	I'm Not There	Bobby Seale / Rabbit Brown	
2007	Breakfast with Scot	Greg Graham	
2007	Late Fragment	Therapist	
2007	King of Sorrow	Lt. Phillip Hugo	
2008	Animal 2	Captain Ellis	
2008	Death Race	Joe's Navigator	
2010	Gangsterland	Brooklyn	
2011	Another Silence	Joshua	
2011	Silent but Deadly	Deputy Jimbo	
2012	Winter Passed	Benz Williams	
2013	Poker Night	Coolie Bear	
2013	Ice Soldiers	Sgt. Joe Gibbs	
2015	N.O.I.R.	Jean-Jacques	
2018	His Master's Voice	Jerome Vick Jr.	
2019	Mafia Inc.	Sergent Brassens Paul	
2021	Crisis	Detective Carson	

=== Television ===
Year	Title	Role	Notes
1995	Sirens	Dice	Episode: "Missing"
1996	Omerta	Cop	Episode #2.12
1997	Millennium	Prison Guard	Episode: "Powers, Principalities, Thrones and Dominions"
1997	The Right Connections	Bartender	Television film
1997	The Sentinel	Jerome Burke	Episode: "Three Point Shot"
1998	Alien Abduction: Incident in Lake County	Matthew	Television film
1998	Stargate SG-1	Driver	Episode: "In the Line of Duty"
1998	Sweet Deception	Security Guard	Television film
1998	Cupid	Psychiatrist	Episode: "Pilot"
1998	The Net	Sarge / Ross	2 episodes
1998	Don't Look Down	Luther	Television film
1998–1999	The Outer Limits	Various roles	4 episodes
1999	Night Man	Pimp	Episode: "Scent of a Woman"
1999	The New Addams Family	Fred	Episode: "Addams Family in Court"
1999	The Crow: Stairway to Heaven	Bovespa	Episode: "Brother's Keeper"
1999	Poltergeist: The Legacy	Security Guard	Episode: "Sacrifice"
1999	Cold Squad	Craig Toms	Episode: "Pretty Fly for a Dead Guy"
2000	Strange World	Tall Man	Episode: "Rage"
2000	Seven Days	Clarence Washington	Episode: "Mr. Donovan's Neighborhood"
2000	Livin' for Love: The Natalie Cole Story	Natalie's Bodyguard	Television film
2000	Holiday Heart	Fisher	Television film
2000	Murder at the Cannes Film Festival	Todd Bellamy	Television film
2001	In a Heartbeat	Truck Driver	Episode: "Time's Up"
2001	The Killing Yard	Johnny Flowers	Television film
2001	No Ordinary Baby	Judge Watson	Television film
2001	'Twas the Night	Police Officer	Television film
2001	Dice	Installation Man #2	6 episodes
2001	Leap Years	Errol / Rapper / Mad Popper	2 episodes
2001	2 frères	Tom	6 episodes
2002	A Season on the Brink	Joby Wright	Television film
2002	Redeemer	Peanut	Television film
2002	Street Time	Wallace Evans	Episode: "Rabid Dog"
2002	Just a Walk in the Park	Temp Doorman	Television film
2002	Conviction	Dealer Con	Television film
2003	3 x rien	Shylock / Jeff Cote	2 episodes
2003	View of Terror	Detective Gillis	Television film
2003	Ice Bound	Morris	Television film
2003	Playmakers	Ray Barnes	Episode: "Halftime"
2003–2004	Blue Murder	Det. Jim Weeks	26 episodes
2004	Baby for Sale	District Attorney	Television film
2004	Wild Card	Cecil	Episode: "Slam Dunk Funk"
2004	Doc	Hank Pederson	Episode: "Nip, Tuck and Die"
2005	The Eleventh Hour	Ron	Episode: "The Miracle Worker"
2005	Tilt	Ricky Taylor	Episode: "Gentleman Jim"
2005	Cyber Seduction: His Secret Life	Coach Suha	Television film
2005	1-800-Missing	Benny	Episode: "Sisterhood"
2005	Tripping the Wire: A Stephen Tree Mystery	William Massey	Television film
2006	At the Hotel	Michael Quenton	6 episodes
2006	Runaway	Vic	4 episodes
2007	Les Sœurs Elliot	Yoli	Television film
2007	My Daughter's Secret	Mark	Television film
2008	Voices	Detective Brock	Television film
2008	Would Be Kings	Lt. Baldwin	2 episodes
2008	Dead at 17	Detective Reese	Television film
2008	Less Than Kind	Towminator	Episode: "The Shel Game"
2008	The Two Mr. Kissels	Construction Manager	Television film
2009	Ring of Deceit	Lester Bragg	Television film
2010–2013	Toute la vérité	René Touzin	16 episodes
2011	Shattered	Tom Rutherford	Episode: "Key with No Lock"
2011	Against the Wall	Tony Miles	Episode: "Lean on Me or Die"
2011–2015	19-2	Tyler Joseph	27 episodes
2011–2015	Rookie Blue	Father Jean Pierre	4 episodes
2014–2017	19-2	Tyler Joseph	37 episodes
2012	The Firm	Lamar Johnson	Episode: "Pilot"
2013	Betty & Coretta	Ralph Abernathy	Television film
2013	The Listener	Julian Courvreur	Episode: "Fatal Vision"
2014	30 Vies lV	Bruce Mangones	3 episodes
2015	Rogue	Ty	2 episodes
2016	District 31	Benjamin Galipeau	Episode: "Cyberintimidation"
2017	Mary Kills People	Judge Lucas Grant	3 episodes
2018	Clash	Julio	Episode: "Sous les apparences"
2018	Mommy's Little Angel	Detective Clemson	Television film
2018	Bull	Agent Kincaid	Episode: "Death Sentence"
2018	Taken	Senator McDermott	Episode: "Viceroy"
2018	Colony	Dean Hudson	Episode: "What Goes Around"
2019	In the Dark	Jamie	2 episodes
2019	Private Eyes	Maverick Mims	Episode: "Full Court Press"
2019	V Wars	Big Dog	3 episodes
2019	The Expanse	McCourt	2 episodes
2020	Diggstown	Stewy Brooks	Episode: "Dani Ewing"
2021	Hudson & Rex	Ted Jerome	Episode: "Oops I Bit It Again"
2023	Good Morning Chuck (Bon matin Chuck, ou l'art de réduire les méfaits)	Joseph B. Jean	
2025	Saint-Pierre	Marcus Villeneuve	10 episodes

=== Video games ===
Year	Title	Role	Notes
2019	Overwatch	Baptiste	
2022	Overwatch 2	Baptiste	
