= A Journal of Insomnia =

2013 web documentary about insomnia

A Journal of Insomnia (French: Journal d'une insomnie collective) is a 2013 web documentary about insomnia, produced by Hugues Sweeney and created by Bruno Choiniere, Philippe Lambert, Thibaut Duverneix and Guillaume Braun for the National Film Board of Canada (NFB). The production had its premiere on April 18, 2013, as part of the Tribeca Film Festival's first Storyscapes section for transmedia.

== Registration ==
Site users must register online for an appointment, after which they receive a phone call informing them that they've been emailed a link to enter site. Once inside A Journal of Insomnia, users can follow the stories of one of four protagonists who share their own experiences with sleeplessness as well as access close to 2000 contributions from other insomniacs that have been collected since the fall of 2012.

It was nominated for the Sheffield Innovation Award at the 2013 Sheffield Doc/Fest.

== Production ==
The idea for the site was conceived by Sweeney, who is head of the NFB's French-language Digital Studio, when he became a father for the first time in the summer of 2009. Sweeney was often up at night with his wife due to his infant daughter's irregular sleep patterns and found himself wondering about all the other people who also might be up at this hour, and the impact of sleeplessness on their lives. As one of NFB French Program's main areas of interest is works related to mental health, Sweeney began to imagine what a webdoc on insomnia might be like. The NFB worked with Montreal-based web design firm Akufen to create A Journal of Insomnia.

== Installation ==
A Journal of Insomnia was adapted as an installation for the Tribeca Film Festival's first-ever Storyscapes competition. The installation consisted of "a black confessional cube" which rests on an incline in a darkened chamber. Visitors enter through a tilted doorway, then sit before a screen from which a disembodied female voice asks questions such as: "During the day, are you anxious about the coming night?" and "What is preventing you from sleeping?".

== See also ==
- American Sleep Apnea Association
