= Mylène Dinh-Robic =

Canadian actress (born 1979)

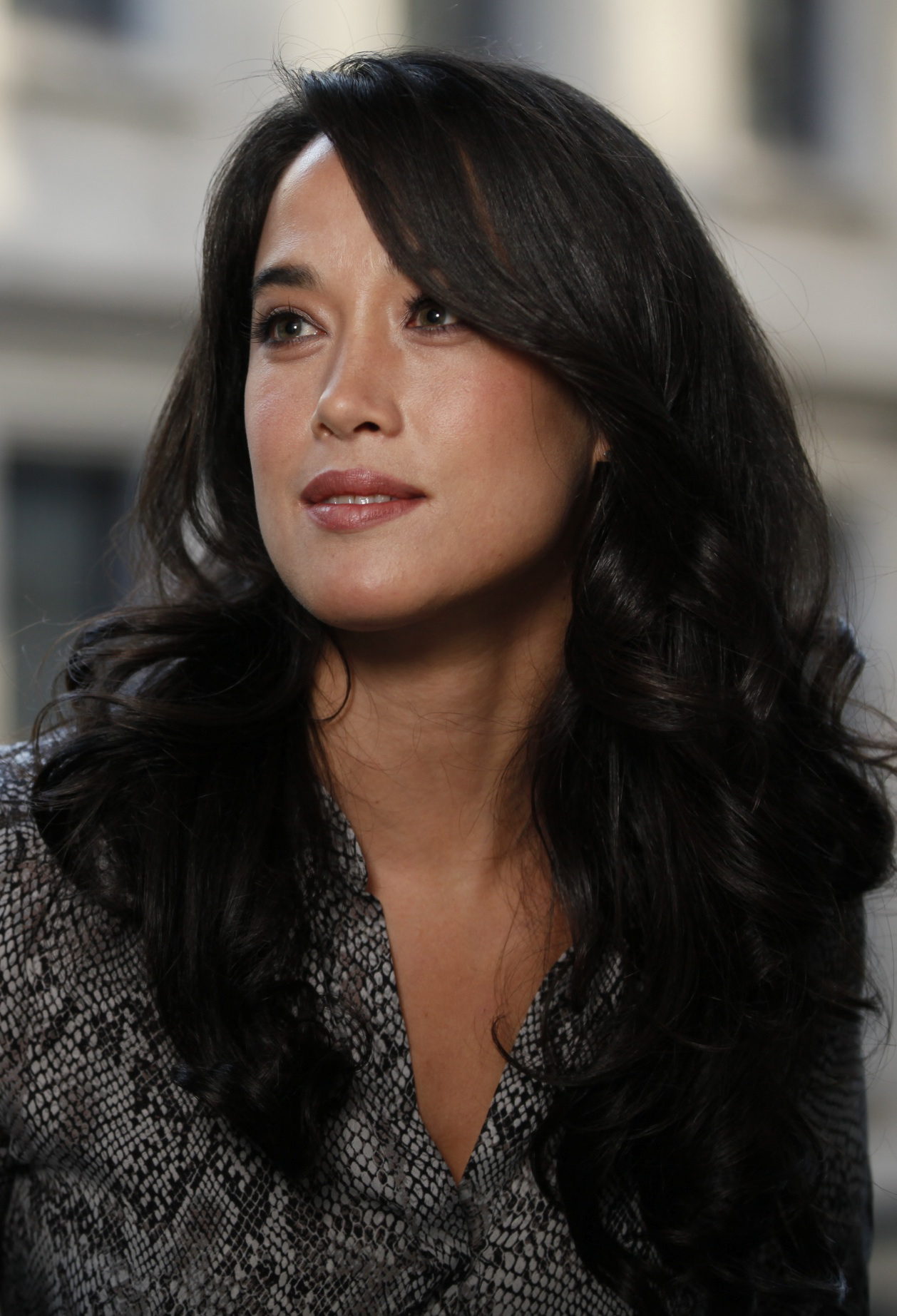
- Dinh-Robic in 2012
- Born: April 17, 1979 (age 47); Montreal, Quebec, Canada
- Education: Concordia University (BA)
- Occupation: Actress
- Years active: 1999–present

Mylène Dinh-Robic (born April 17, 1979) is a Canadian actress.

== Biography ==
A Francophone from Montreal, Quebec, Dinh-Robic is of Québécois paternal and Vietnamese maternal heritage. She has worked on stage, on camera, and in video games. She first performed opposite actor Nicholas Campbell as Rita Mah, one of the main characters in CBC's Da Vinci's City Hall. She later worked in Toronto on three seasons of CTV's The Listener as Dr. Olivia Fawcett and went on to portray officer Beatrice ‘Bear’ Hamelin for four years in Bravo's 19-2. Her notable work in French includes Montreal-shot productions Plan B, Discussion avec mes parents and Double Faute, and she presently portrays Vera Rosenbaum in TVA's Les Bracelets Rouges.

Her voice and motion capture work in video games began with the role of Liza Snow in Far Cry 3 (2012), and she more recently portrayed Star-Lord’s mother Meredith Quill in Marvel's Guardians of the Galaxy (2021).

Dinh-Robic resides in Montreal and holds a BA in communications from Concordia University. She studied acting with Benjamin Ratner and Nancy Sivak in Vancouver, and with Gilles Plouffe and John Strasberg in Montreal.

== Filmography ==
=== Television ===
- Da Vinci's Inquest – Odette (2003)
- Young Blades – Sister Eleanor (2005)
- The 4400 – Kimmy (2005)
- Da Vinci's City Hall – Rita Mah (2005–2006)
- Smallville – Canadian Daughter (2007)
- Stargate: Atlantis – Anika (2008)
- The Quality of Life – Rita Mah (2008)
- The Border – Detective Sergeant Claudette Mackenzie (2009)
- Toute La Vérité – Catherine-Anne (2010)
- Republic of Doyle – Olive Maher (2012)
- The Listener – Olivia Fawcett (2009–2012)
- Série Noire – Evelyne (2014)
- Les Jeunes Loups – Me Nguyen (2014)
- Being Human – Caroline (2014)
- Nouvelle Adresse – Suki Bernier (2014)
- 19-2 – Beatrice 'Bear' Hamelin (2014–2017)
- Yellow (Short) – Ghost Woman (2017)
- The Detectives – Nancy Allen (2018)
- Plan B – Josée (2018)
- The Bold Type – Christina Rose (2019)
- Jérémie – Marina (2019)
- Piégés - Lucie Lacerte (2020)
- Toute la vie - Murielle Casavant (2020)
- Une Autre Histoire - Sgt Tran-Lapointe (2021)
- Transplant - Liz (2020)
- Three Pines - Sandra Morrow (2022)
- Les Bracelets Rouges - Dr. Vera Rosenbaum (2022–2024)

=== Film ===
- Mount Pleasant – Louise (2006)
- L'Oiseau Mort (Short) – Mme Faure (2006)
- Lac Mystère – Kim (French Feature) (2013)
- Medic (Short) – Megan (2016)
- Good Sam – Marie Ellis (2019)
- Chaos Walking – Julie (2021)
- Fatherhood – Denise (2021)
- The Wolf and the Lion – Dean at Music Academy (2021)
- Sam – Directrice (French Feature) (2021)
- Si Seulement...peut-être... (Short) – Midori (2022)
- The Unquiet - Gail (2008)

=== Video games ===
- Far Cry 3 – Liza Snow (2012)
- Batman: Arkham Origins – Bank Manager (2013)
- Watch Dogs – Rose Washington (2014)
- Far Cry 4 – Noore Najjar (2014)
- Deus Ex: Mankind Divided – Delara Auzenne (2016)
- Deus Ex: Mankind Divided - A Criminal Past – Delara Auzenne (2017)
- Outriders – MC Female (2021)
- Marvel's Guardians of the Galaxy – Meredith Quill (2021)
- Avatar: Frontiers of Pandora – Priya Chen (2023)
