= Patrice Laliberté =

Canadian film and television director and screenwriter

Patrice Laliberté is a Canadian film and television director and screenwriter from Quebec. He is most noted for his 2015 short film Overpass (Viaduc), which won the Toronto International Film Festival award for Best Canadian Short Film at the 2015 Toronto International Film Festival. It was shortlisted for Best Live Action Short Drama at the 4th Canadian Screen Awards.

He has also directed the short films Je t'aime à la livre (2009), Laisser don'faire (2011), Le souffle que l'on retient (2014), Le cycle des moteurs (2014) and Late Night Drama (2016), the television miniseries La Boîte à malle (2012) and web series Gamer(s) (season 1 2017, season 2 2020).

His feature film debut, The Decline (Jusqu'au déclin), was the first feature film from Quebec to be distributed as a Netflix original film. The film had a theatrical premiere at the Rendez-vous Québec Cinéma in February 2020 before its launch on Netflix. He produced the film with his company Couronne Nord.

His second feature film, Very Nice Day (Très belle journée), shot on a smartphone, was released in 2022.

He is currently working on the adaptation of the Quebecois novel Tout est ori with its author Paul Serge Forest and Guillaume Laurin.

== Filmography ==
- The Decline (2020)
- Very Nice Day (2022)
