= Bla Bla =

- Directed by: Vincent Morisset
- Produced by: Hugues Sweeney
- Music by: Philippe Lambert
- Distributed by: National Film Board of Canada
- Release date: 2011
- Country: Canada
- Language: English

BLA BLA is an interactive animated film for computer created by Vincent Morisset with Montreal studio AATOAA, and produced by the National Film Board of Canada. The online work has been described as exploring "the principles of human communication," and follows Morisset's collaborations with Arcade Fire on Neon Bible, considered the first interactive music video.

The characters in BLA BLA were designed by Caroline Robert using stop-motion puppetry and traditional animation as well as computer animation methods such as ActionScript animation and real-time 3D mapping. The work is designed to be principally non-linear, with users constructing the story through point-and-click choices.

The music by composer Philippe Lambert and characters' speech was broken into short clips and distributed randomly throughout the programming, which was created by Édouard Lanctôt-Benoit. As an added bonus, BLA BLA users can also access classic NFB animated films, including works by Ryan Larkin, René Jodoin and Michèle Cournoyer and Norman McLaren. BLA BLA was produced for the NFB by Hugues Sweeney.

The work stands apart in its emphasis on achieving an emotional response in the viewer/actor. "I wanted to create moods and generate emotions through an interactive piece," Morriset says. "It's quite hard to do dramatic crescendos on a website… I thought it would be an interesting challenge."

BLA BLA was featured in spring 2012 at a month-long live interactive presentation in Paris.

== Awards ==
In March 2012, BLA BLA received the SXSW Interactive Art Award as well as the Entertainment Award in the Communication Arts Interactive Competition. In May 2012, it received the Webby Award for best web art.
