= Nicolas Krief =

Nicolas Krief is a Canadian film director and screenwriter from Quebec. He is most noted as co-writer with Henry Bernadet and Isabelle Brouillette of the 2023 film Gamma Rays (Les Rayons gammma), for which they received a Canadian Screen Award nomination for Best Original Screenplay at the 13th Canadian Screen Awards in 2025.

He previously directed a number of short films, and was cowriter of the films The Decline (Jusqu'au déclin) and Very Nice Day (Très belle journée).

His short film Opération Carcajou won the Prix Télé-Québec at the 2021 Abitibi-Témiscamingue International Film Festival. In the same year, he began developing Carcajou, an expansion of the short film which will mark his full-length directorial debut.

== Filmography ==
- Séfarade - 2012, director and writer
- The Notion of Mistake (La Notion d'erreur) - 2016, director and writer
- Games of Patience - 2017, director and writer
- Skynet - 2018, director and writer
- The Decline (Jusqu'au déclin) - 2020, writer
- Opération Carcajou - 2021, director and writer
- Very Nice Day (Très belle journée) - 2022, writer
- Gamma Rays (Les Rayons gammma), 2023, writer
