= West of Pluto =

- French: À l'ouest de Pluton
- Directed by: Henry Bernadet; Myriam Verreault
- Written by: Henry Bernadet; Myriam Verreault
- Produced by: Virginie Barret; Henry Bernadet; Myriam Verreault
- Cinematography: Patrick Faucher
- Edited by: Myriam Verreault
- Music by: Josué Beaucage; Mathieu Campagna; Louis Dugal; Philip Larouche
- Production company: Vostok Films
- Distributed by: GKIDS
- Release date: October 24, 2008
- Running time: 95 minutes
- Country: Canada
- Language: French
- Budget: $10,000

West of Pluto (French: À l'ouest de Pluton) is a Canadian comedy-drama docufiction film, directed by Henry Bernadet and Myriam Verreault and released in 2008.

== Synopsis ==
The film presents a full day in the life of Quebec teenagers. From waking up through school to an open house, the film puts the viewer in the shoes of the different characters by presenting a selection of typical scenes from teenage life in Quebec. We see teenagers making oral presentations in class, smoking drugs, discussing existential issues, trying to get beer before the legal age, criticizing social uniformity, partying and making love.

The film is acted by a cast of non-professional teen actors, cast from the high school in the Quebec City neighbourhood of Loretteville.

== Cast ==
- Alexis Drolet as Jérôme
- David Bouchard as Pierre-Olivier
- Anne-Sophie Tremblay Lamontagne as Kim
- Yoann Linteau as Benoit "Paluche"
- Sandra Jacques as Émilie Bégin
- Micaël Minguy-Bédard as Nicolas
- Yann Bernard as Kevin
- Marc-Alexandre Paradis as Steve Labbé
- Denis Marchand as Gaetan
- Thomas Gionet-Lavigne as Emilie's brother
- Caroline Beauséjour as Isa
- Frédérique Boivin-Lafrance as Nath
- Cynthia Paquet as Véro
- Marie-Pier B. Touzin as Jenn
- Lise Castonguay as mother of Benoît
- Sylvain Brosseau as Mario the Pusher
- Virginie Leblanc as Magalie
- Marie Frédérique Auger as waitress at Chez Gilles Patate
- Mélanie Bouchard-Rochette as Jerome's sister
- Odette Lampron as mother of Emilie Bégin
- Mario Gagnon as Emilie Bégin's father
- Réal Rochette as Jérôme's father
- Lina Bouchard as Jerome's mother
- Alexandro Rizzo as friend of Paluche
- Roger Miville-Deschesnes as convenience store customer
- Martin Roy as convenience store clerk
- Marie-Sophie Vaillancourt as mother of Pierre-Olivier
- Victor Doyon-Allard as little boy with styrofoam
- Mia Piché as little girl with a carriage
- Mathieu St-Pierre as boy on the couch
- Luc Archambault as doctor

== Release ==
The film premiered in competition at the 2008 Festival du nouveau cinéma. It was subsequently screened in competition at the 2009 International Film Festival Rotterdam, before going into commercial release in February 2009.

== Followup ==
Verreault and Bernadet each later emerged with solo film efforts, Verreault with Kuessipan in 2019, and Bernadet with Gamma Rays (Les Rayons gamma) in 2023.

When Telefilm Canada launched its contemporary program of digitally restoring classic Canadian films in the late 2010s, West of Pluto was one of the first films selected by the FNC, with the restored version receiving a screening at the 2021 Festival du nouveau cinéma. Despite this, the film has proven perenially difficult to locate even in its digital version; in 2024, Verreault launched an appeal on social media for a distributor to make the film available, and noted that she has sometimes even resorted to mailing out home-burned DVD-R copies of the film to people who contacted her to ask where they could find it.
