= La plus belle pour aller danser =

Single by Sylvie Vartan

from the album À Nashville
- Language: French
- English title: The most beautiful to dance with
- Released: March 1964
- Label: RCA Victor
- Composer(s): Georges Garvarentz
- Lyricist(s): Charles Aznavour

Sylvie Vartan singles chronology
"Si je chante" (1963)	"La plus belle pour aller danser" (1964)	"Mister moonlight" (1964)

Alternative cover

Music video
- "La plus belle pour aller danser" (official live, 1965) on YouTube

"La plus belle pour aller danser" (Translation: The most beautiful to dance with) is a song by Sylvie Vartan from the 1964 French feature film Cherchez l'idole.

== Background and writing ==
The song was written by Charles Aznavour and Georges Garvarentz.

== Commercial performance ==
The song spent 11 weeks at no. 1 in France.

In Wallonia (Belgium) the single spent 24 weeks in the chart, peaking at no. 3.

The song also reached no. 1 in Japan.

== Track listings ==
7-inch EP RCA 86046 (March 1964, France, Spain, Portugal, etc.)

A1. "La plus belle pour aller danser" (2:29)
A2. "Un air de fête" (2:13)
B1. "Dum di la" (1:54)
B2. "Ne l'imite pas" (2:48)

7-inch single RCA Victor 49.067 (1970, France)

1. "La plus belle pour aller danser"
2. "Si je chante"

7-inch single "Aidoru o Sagase / Koi no Shokku" RCA Victor SS-1476 (1964, Japan)

A. "Aidoru o Sagase" (アイドルを探せ) ("La Plus Belle Pour Aller Danser") (2:28)
B. "Koi no Shokku" (恋のショック) ("Si Je Chante")

7-inch single "Aidoru o Sagase / Watashi o Aishite" RCA SS-2018 (1972, Japan)

A. "Aidoru o Sagase" (アイドルを探せ) ("La Plus Belle Pour Aller Danser") (2:28)
B. "Watashi o Aishite" (私を愛して) ("Car Tu T'en Vas")

== Charts ==
Chart (1964)	Peak position
Belgium (Ultratop 50 Wallonia)	3
France	1
Japan	1
Spain Promusicae	3

== Cover versions ==
The song has been covered, among others, by Pompilia Stoian (Romania), Thanh Lan (Vietnam), Michèle Richard (Canada), Huoy Meas (Cambodia), Chris Garneau, Sarah Dagenais-Hakim and Emilie-Claire Barlow on her Juno Award winning album Seule ce soir.

== See also ==
- List of number-one singles of 1964 (France)
