= My Tribe Is My Life =

Interactive web documentary

My Tribe Is My Life (French: Ma tribu c'est ma vie) is an interactive web documentary produced in Montreal by the National Film Board of Canada (NFB), which explores how young people use the internet to forge identities and relationships within various music subcultures. Directed by Myriam Verreault, the project follows eight people from across the province of Quebec who have found virtual communities through the Web.

Web users watch videos about the eight protagonists, along with survey questions, statistics and quotes. The site features live streaming music, and users can also create their own online avatars.

The idea for a web documentary about online musical communities was conceived by NFB interactive producer Hugues Sweeney.My Tribe Is My Life was produced by Sweeney and web designer Alex Leduc of Atelier Deux Huit Huit.

My Tribe Is My Life received the grand prize for best experimental website at the 2011 Concours Boomerang, honouring Quebec interactive media.
