= Hugues Sweeney =

Hugues Sweeney is head of French-language interactive media production at the National Film Board of Canada, based in Montreal. Sweeney's recent credits include My Tribe Is My Life, the online interactive animation work called Bla Bla, Rouge au carré, an interactive work about the 2012 Quebec student protests, and the 2013 production A Journal of Insomnia, a web documentary about insomnia which was originally conceived by Sweeney in the summer of 2009, when he and his wife were up nights due to the irregular sleep patterns of their newborn daughter.

In 2012, he was appointed as the jury president for the 18th edition of the Concours Boomerang—the platform that honored the best advertising and interactive websites by Quebec companies.

From 2000 to 2007, he headed Radio Canada's Bande à part multi-platform project. He studied philosophy at the Dominican College of Philosophy and Theology in Ottawa and multimedia at Université du Québec à Montréal.
