= Sarah Dagenais-Hakim =

- Born: Montreal, Quebec, Canada
- Occupation: Actress

Sarah Dagenais-Hakim is a French Canadian actress and singer, born in Montreal, Quebec, best known for her roles as Ilsa Trépanier in Lance et Compte and Nadja Fernandez in Victor Lessard.

== Life and career ==
After training in Jazz Vocal Performance at Concordia University, Sarah Dagenais-Hakim completed a degree in drama at l’École Supérieure de Théâtre de l'Université du Québec à Montréal. As soon as she graduated, she landed a lead role in 30 Vies, and caught the public attention. Then she moved on to Les Beaux Malaises, 19-2, Tu m’aimes-tu?, Trauma and Légitime Dépenses, to name a few. In 2015, Sarah played the journalist Ilsa Trépanier in the final season of Lance et Compte. This part really captured the attention of the media and the public. In 2016, Sarah was starring in Blue Moon and Séquelles. In 2017, she plays the lead role of Nadja Fernandez in the police thriller Victor Lessard.

Sarah is also a proficient singer, as she has been performing professionally for more than a decade. She participated to Les Francofolies de Montréal, the Montréal Cirque Fest, and collaborated many times with The 7 Fingers troupe. She was awarded prizes in prestigious singing contests throughout the province, including Ma Première Place des Arts. In 2010, her participation to the musical Je m'voyais déjà led her to a radio number one hit La Plus Belle Pour Aller Danser, from the musical's album. In 2015, she joined the cast of 50 Shades The Musical Parody, and is touring the province in 2016. Sarah is an all-round performer of soul, R&B, jazz, blues, Motown and Pop. She is the leader of her own band, Sarah D. Hakim Band, alongside top rated musicians in Quebec. She is currently crafting her first album as a singer-songwriter.

== Filmography ==
=== Short films ===
- 2011: Le Pourquoi du comment ... Solveigh
- 2013: Encrages ... Juliette
- 2014: Les gars des vues – Pimp ta route ... Cynthia
- 2015: Le Truck ... Sophie

=== Television ===
- 2005: Le cœur a ses raisons
- 2007: C.A. ... Amie de Marie-Pierre
- 2009: RemYx ... Rosalie
- 2011: Toute la vérité ... Mariève
- 2012: Trauma ... Naïla
- 2012: Légitime Dépense ... Sonia
- 2012: Tu m'aimes-tu? ... Jolie Sportive
- 2013: 19-2 ... Josée Martel
- 2013: Unité 9 ... Patricia
- 2013: 30 vies ... Maria Mazzini
- 2014: Les Beaux Malaises ... Jeune femme commis
- 2015: Lance et Compte ... Ilsa Trépanier
- 2016: Blue Moon ... Diane Delcourt
- 2016: Séquelles ... Julie
- 2017: Victor Lessard ... Nadja Fernandez

== Awards and distinctions ==
- 2009: Winner of the Interpreter 1st Prize – Chante en Français Contest
- 2010: Winner of Prix Hydro-Québec – Ma Première Place des Arts
- 2010: Radio No. 1 Single – La Plus Belle Pour Aller Danser from the musical's album Je m'voyais déjà
