= 19-2 (2011 TV series) =

- Genre: Police procedural Action
- Created by: Réal Bossé; Claude Legault
- Written by: Joanne Arseneau; Danielle Dansereau; Réal Bossé
- Directed by: Daniel Grou
- Starring: Claude Legault; Réal Bossé; Julie Perreault; Sylvain Marcel; Catherine Bérubé; Jean Petitclerc; Vincent Graton; Magalie Lépine-Blondeau; Benz Antoine; Véronique Beaudet; Robert Naylor
- Composer: Nicolas Maranda
- Country of origin: Canada
- Original language: French
- No. of seasons: 3
- No. of episodes: 30

Production
- Executive producer: Sophie Deschênes
- Production locations: Montreal, Quebec, Canada
- Running time: 42 minutes
- Production company: Société Radio-Canada

Original release
- Network: Télévision de Radio-Canada
- Release: February 2, 2011 – April 1, 2015

19-2 is a Canadian police procedural crime drama television series created by Réal Bossé and Claude Legault, who also star in it. Set in Montreal, it follows the patrol officers of the fictional Station 19 of the Service de police métropolitain, a stand-in for the real Service de police de la Ville de Montréal (SPVM), and explores how the job affects their professional and personal lives. The title comes from the call sign of the patrol car of the two main characters. (Note: According to the SPVM SPVM Montreal Police site, they have 33 stations, none of which are currently numbered #19. The 2001 Annual Report showed that the former SPCUM Montreal Police had a station 19 covering the downtown east side and Plateau Mont-Royal.)

The series premiered on Radio-Canada on 2 February 2011 and ran for three seasons and 30 episodes, concluding on 1 April 2015. All episodes were directed by Daniel Grou (credited as Podz). An English-language adaptation premiered on Bravo on January 29, 2014, and concluded production in 2017. The fourth and final season of the English version premiered on CTV in Canada on July 31, 2017.

The show was a critical and ratings success in Quebec: its first season drew about 1.3 million viewers a week, making it the most-watched series in the province that winter. It received 18 nominations at the 2011 Gémeaux Awards and won in categories including best dramatic series, and Legault was nominated for an International Emmy Award in 2014. An English-language adaptation premiered on Bravo on 29 January 2014 and ran for four seasons, ending on CTV in 2017.

== Synopsis ==
Nicolai "Nick" Berrof and his partner Jean-Pierre Harvey are shot responding to a burglary. While Berrof is spared by his body armour, Harvey is shot in the head and left hospitalized for life. Replacing Harvey is Benoît Chartier, a veteran constable from the Sûreté du Québec, who transferred to Montreal to escape troubles in his hometown. As officers from Poste 19 deal with the challenges of police work, they struggle with their own personal challenges as well. Chartier is estranged from his family after he personally arrests his own father for drunk driving. Berrof struggles with his divorce with his colleague and is estranged from his wife Detective Isabelle Latendresse. Tyler Joseph struggles with alcoholism. Jean-Marc Brouillard abuses his wife. Commander Marcel Gendron struggles to protect the station's image in the face of pressure from the public and his superiors alike.

By the end of the first season, Chartier's former employer, the SQ, assigns him to find a mole within the station. The second season centres around his hunt for the mole with Berrof being the prime suspect. After being gravely wounded in a shooting, Tyler attempts to defeat his alcoholism. Brouillard and Pouliot build a relationship after having been partnered together. Gendron's daughter disappears amidst the discovery of a child pornography ring.

The third season begins in the aftermath of the mole's suicide. Having taken the hunt for the mole to the extreme, Berrof must deal with the consequences of his actions. Chartier, engaged to Berrof's sister, unwittingly becomes the target of Berrof's powerful enemies. Berrof becomes implicated deeper and deeper into Montreal's underworld as his crime-troubled past and law enforcement present collide.

== Characters ==
- Claude Legault as Benoît "Ben" Chartier
- Réal Bossé as Nicolaï "Nick" Berrof
- Benz Antoine as Tyler Joseph
- Véronique Beaudet as Bérengère Hamelin
- Sylvain Marcel as Sergeant Julien Houle
- Catherine Bérubé as Audrey Pouliot
- Vincent Graton as Jean-Pierre Harvey
- Julie Perreault as Sergeant-detective Isabelle Latendresse
- Louis Philippe Dandenault as Jean-Marc Brouillard
- Fred-Éric Salvail as Vincent "Vince" Légaré
- Jean Petitclerc as Marcel Gendron
- Robert Naylor as Théo
- Magalie Lépine-Blondeau as Amélie De Grandpré
- Fanny Mallette as Catherine
- Louise Portal as Marie-Louise
- Marc-François Blondin as Sylvio
- Sarah Dagenais-Hakim as Josée Martel
- Marie-Evelyne Lessard as Valérie Jean

== Episodes ==
The original French version started filming in 2010, and premiered on 2 February 2011 and ended on 6 April 2011. 39% of Quebeckers watched the pilot when it aired. On 15 June 2011, the Radio-Canada channel renewed the contract for another season, which was filmed in 2012 and premiered on 28 January 2013. It ended on 1 April 2013. By the end of 2013, Radio-Canada ordered a third season to be produced, which was filmed in 2014 and premiered on 28 January 2015. The series finale aired on 1 April 2015.

== Reception ==
Reviews have been positive overall. Police officers in Quebec have liked the series, seeing a way to make viewers more aware of their daily lives.

During the first season, the show attracted about 1.3 million viewers per week, which made it the most popular series in Quebec of the winter. It peaked at 1,447,000 viewers on 23 February 2011, and the season finale got 1,302,000 viewers, the top in its time slot.

In its second season, critics unanimously praised the first episode, which was based on the 2006 Dawson College shooting. It was watched by 1,554,000 viewers, about 39 percent of the viewers that evening in Quebec. (A shot-for-shot remake of this episode, filmed at the same school and also directed by Daniel Grou (Podz), was broadcast as the second-season premiere of the English version of the series.)

The series received 18 nominations at the 26th Gémeaux Awards, including Claude Legault and Réal Bossé for best leading actor in a dramatic role, and went on to win at the gala held on 18 September 2011. Its wins included best dramatic series, best direction, best writing, best photography, best sound, best original music score, best original music theme, and best supporting actor and actress in a drama. The Canada Media Fund's annual report noted that 19-2 won by far the most awards of any French-language drama funded by the Fund that year.

The series was also nominated for the Prix Artis and the Zapettes d'Or.

In 2014, Claude Legault was nominated for the International Emmy Award for Best Performance by an Actor for his role as Benoît Chartier. The other nominees were Stephen Dillane (The Tunnel), Pablo Rago (Televisión por la Justicia) and Xiubo Wu (The Orphan of Zhao).
