= The Decline (film) =

2020 Quebec film

- Official poster
- French: Jusqu'au déclin
- Directed by: Patrice Laliberté
- Screenplay by: Charles Dionne; Nicolas Krief; Patrice Laliberté
- Produced by: Julie Groleau
- Starring: Guillaume Laurin; Réal Bossé; Marc-André Grondin; Marie-Evelyne Lessard
- Cinematography: Christophe Dalpé
- Edited by: Arthur Tarnowski
- Music by: Jason Sharp
- Production company: Couronne Nord
- Distributed by: Netflix
- Release date: February 28, 2020 (RVQC)
- Country: Canada
- Language: French

The Decline (French: Jusqu'au déclin, lit. "Until the Decline") is a 2020 Canadian action thriller film directed by Patrice Laliberté in his feature debut. It is the first film made in Quebec to be produced as a Netflix original film. The film stars Guillaume Laurin as Antoine, a man from Montreal who becomes worried about a natural disaster and joins a survivalist training program in rural Nord-du-Québec led by an experienced middle-aged survivalist, Alain (Réal Bossé). While the participants at first bond with the charismatic Alain, they become divided after a trainee dies in an accident.

The film's cast includes Marc-André Grondin, Isabelle Giroux, Marilyn Castonguay, Marc Beaupré, Marie-Evelyne Lessard and Guillaume Cyr.

The film had its theatrical premiere at the Rendez-vous Québec Cinéma in February 2020, with its premiere on Netflix slated for later in the year. It was later made available as an original on Netflix, with dubbed audio tracks in 32 languages. For the English version (directed by John DeMita), all of the original cast dubbed their own dialogue to ensure that the accent of Francophone Québécois speaking English would be accurately represented.

== Plot ==
A young man named Antoine, his female partner, and their young daughter are practicing an emergency evacuation of their home, grabbing a "bug-out bag" of equipment and timing their effort. The next day, the family watches a survivalist training video on food preservation made by Alain, a charismatic, middle-aged survival enthusiast. After being invited to visit Alain's cabin for a multi-day training session, Antoine drives alone in winter to the isolated camp, where he meets Alain.

Alain has developed a self-sufficient camp, with a cabin, greenhouse, chicken coops, a generator, solar panels, and batteries. Other survivalist enthusiasts arrive at the camp, including Rachel (a former soldier), Sebastien (a hunting enthusiast), Anna, François, and David, a paramilitary type.

Alain trains the students in handgun and rifle drills, snaring and field dressing small animals, and planting in the greenhouse. The students eat in Alain's cabin and sleep in a large tent. During the evening meal, Alain tells the students about his survivalist philosophies. He says that the students are all excellent examples of what a "lucid citizen" should be. He notes that if society collapses, he can live in his camp and supply his own needs. He invites Antoine to think about joining him in the camp in the future.

Alain next teaches the students how to build pipe bombs. He says that, in the event of social collapse, if a large number of "migrants with machetes" try to come to the camp, rifles alone might not be a sufficient defence. After testing a bomb, the students pack up the equipment. As François carries a crate of bombs back to camp, it accidentally explodes and kills him.

Most of the students want to call the police and report the accident, but Alain and David refuse. They say that all risk being charged with domestic terrorism or manslaughter, and Alain will lose his survival camp. Alain adjourns the meeting and suggests they decide what to do in the morning. The students agree and go to bed. From inside the tent, they see a sudden bright light. When they emerge, they see Alain burning François's body with gasoline. After protesting, most of the students try to leave the camp by snowmobile, but Alain shoots Anna in the leg.

He and David carry her into the cabin, where Alain treats her wound and ties her up. The remaining students run into the woods. Sebastien soon dies in a noose snare-trap. Antoine and Rachel escape into the bush, where they find a backup "bug-out" cache of arms and food prepared by Alain.

The next day, the pair manage to get to Antoine's car, but David ambushes them and fatally shoots Antoine with an assault rifle. Rachel has a shoot-out with David, and kills him in close combat with blows from a pistol butt. She returns to the cabin, and discovers that Anna has died. Rachel sets fire to the greenhouse and takes the assault rifle to the upper floor to watch for Alain.

When Alain returns on his snowmobile, he sees the two dead bodies at the parking area and returns to his cabin. As Alain draws near, Rachel fires at him, pinning him down. He manages to hide his movement and get to the cabin. He and Rachel have a brutal hand-to-hand fight. She controls him despite her injuries. As Alain's previous speech about survivalism is heard in the background, Rachel loads the wounded man onto a sled attached to the snowmobile and drives out of the camp.

== Cast ==
- Guillaume Laurin as Antoine
- Marie-Evelyne Lessard as Rachel
- Réal Bossé as Alain
- Marc Beaupré as David
- Marilyn Castonguay as Anna
- Guillaume Cyr as Sebastien
- Marc-André Grondin as François

== Awards and nominations ==
Award	Date of ceremony	Category	Recipient(s)	Result	Ref(s)
Canadian Screen Awards	May 20, 2021	Best Editing	Arthur Tarnowski	Nominated	
Prix collégial du cinéma québécois	2021	Best Film	The Decline	Nominated	
Prix Iris	June 6, 2021	Best Actor	Réal Bossé	Nominated	
Prix Iris	June 6, 2021	Best Actress	Marie-Evelyne Lessard	Nominated	
Prix Iris	June 6, 2021	Best Editing	Arthur Tarnowski	Nominated	
Prix Iris	June 6, 2021	Best Sound	Sylvain Bellemare, Bernard Gariépy Strobl, François Grenon	Nominated	
Prix Iris	June 6, 2021	Best Makeup	Dominique T. Hasbani	Nominated	
Prix Iris	June 6, 2021	Best Visual Effects	Sébastien Chartier, Jean-François Ferland, Marie-Claude Lafontaine	Won	
Prix Iris	June 6, 2021	Best First Film	Patrice Laliberté	Nominated	
Prix Iris	June 6, 2021	Public Prize	Patrice Laliberté, Julie Groleau	Nominated	
