= I'm an Adult Now (The Listener) =

- The Listener episode
- Episode no.: Season 1 Episode 1
- Directed by: Clement Virgo
- Written by: Michael Amo
- Original air date: March 3, 2009

Episode chronology
← Previous —	Next → "Emotional Rescue"

"I'm an Adult Now" is the first episode of the first season of the science fiction drama television series The Listener. The episode first premiered on March 3, 2009, in many countries on Fox International Channels, and premiered on June 3, 2009, in Canada on CTV, and was broadcast on NBC at the same time on the same day.

The show centers on Toby Logan (Craig Olejnik), a 28-year-old paramedic who has the ability to listen to people's surface thoughts. In this episode, Toby helps a lady after a car crash. Using his ability, he asks her if anybody else was in the car. She says no, but sees her thinking about her kidnapped son. Toby helps and investigates in the case.

The episode was written by Michael Amo and directed by Clement Virgo. The concept of The Listener was devised by Amo, as his first television series. Principal photography for the episode commenced in Toronto, Ontario.

"I'm An Adult Now" received mixed reviews from television commentators.
