= Louis Caron =

Canadian journalist and writer (1942–2026)

- Born: July 21, 1942
- Died: September 14, 2026 (aged 84); Nicolet, Quebec, Canada
- Occupations: Journalist, writer

Louis Caron (July 21, 1942 – September 14, 2026) was a Canadian journalist and writer from Quebec. He is most noted for his novels The Draft Dodger (L'Emmitouflé), which won the Prix Québec-Paris in 1977, Le canard de bois, which was a finalist for the Governor General's Award for French-language fiction at the 1981 Governor General's Awards, and Les fils de la liberté II: La corne de brume, which was a finalist for the same award at the 1982 Governor General's Awards, and as co-creator and writer of the television drama series He Shoots, He Scores (Lance et compte).

Caron worked as a journalist for Radio-Canada and Le Nouvelliste prior to publishing his first novel, L'Illusioniste, in 1973.

In 2015, he published Le visionnaire, the first novel in a new trilogy of historical novels which represented his first new published work since 2005.

Caron died in Nicolet, Quebec on September 14, 2026, at the age of 84.

== Works ==
- L'Illusionniste (1973)
- L'Emmitouflé (1977)
- Le Bonhomme Sept-heures ISBN 0776130307
- Le Canard de bois (1981, ISBN 2020058898)
- Les Fils de la liberté II. La Corne de brume (1982, ISBN 2020064790)
- Racontages (1983, ISBN 2890520846)
- Le Vrai Voyage de Jacques Cartier (1984)
- Marco-Polo : Le nouveau livre des merveilles (1985)
- La Vie d'artiste (1987, ISBN 2890522083)
- Au fond des mers (1987, ISBN 2890522091)
- Les Fils de la liberté III. Le coup de poing (1990, ISBN 2020105918)
- Les Chemins du Nord . La tuque et le béret (1992–1993, ISBN 2909241173)
- Les Chemins du Nord II. Le Bouleau et l'épinette (1993, ISBN 2-909241-40-8)
- Montréal : un parfum d'îles (1994, ISBN 2-7604-0458-7)
- Terre des Inuit (1997, ISBN 2-920718-68-1)
- Les Chemins du Nord III. L'outarde et la palombe (1999, ISBN 2-84187-165-7)
- Le Corps collectionneur (2000, ISBN 2-922265-14-5)
- Il n'y a plus d'Amérique (2002, ISBN 2-7646-0160-3)
- Tête heureuse (2005, ISBN 2-7646-0413-0)
- Le Temps des bâtisseurs 1. Le visionnaire (2015, ISBN 2-8098-1692-1)
