= He Shoots, He Scores =

- Also known as: Lance et compte
- Genre: Sports drama
- Created by: Réjean Tremblay; Louis Caron
- Country of origin: Canada
- Original languages: French; English
- No. of seasons: 9

Production
- Producer: Claude Héroux
- Production locations: Quebec City, Quebec
- Running time: 43-47 minutes for the series and 78-80 minutes for the TV movies

Original release
- Network: Société Radio-Canada (1986–1989); CBC Television (1986); TQS (2001); TVA (1991–1992 and 2004–2015)

He Shoots, He Scores (French: Lance et compte) is a Canadian téléroman, or television drama series, revolving around a fictional ice hockey team based in Quebec City. The series aired from 1986 to 1989 on the Radio-Canada network, and revival series on TQS in 2001 and on TVA from 2004 to 2015.

The first season was filmed in both French and English, the English version appearing on CBC Television as He Shoots, He Scores. It was the first television series to air simultaneously in English on CBC and in French on Radio-Canada. (An earlier series, La famille Plouffe, had aired on both networks, but not simultaneously; the English version aired approximately a year behind the French series. Each episode of Lance et Compte, however, aired in English as He Shoots, He Scores in the same week.)

The series was scripted by Réjean Tremblay and Louis Caron for the first season, and by Tremblay and Jacques Jacob after that. Following the end of the regular series, a number of television movies continued to air into the 1990s. A new generation of the series started to air in 2001 and a movie was made in 2010.

== Synopsis ==
The series was written by Réjean Tremblay and novelist Louis Caron for the first season (later replaced by Jacques Jacob), and tells the story of the fictional National Hockey League team Le National from Quebec City, and its players. The main protagonist is Pierre Lambert (Carl Marotte), the young, handsome player drafted by Le National from the Trois-Rivières Dragons junior team.

In the first season, Pierre Lambert is selected to play for Le National de Québec, his boyhood team, along with his best friend Denis Mercure (Jean Harvey). During that year, Pierre learns how to control himself at the pro level and how to deal with hockey and his love life.

The second season is focused on the World Cup of Hockey. Pierre Lambert is selected to play for Team Canada but personal issues cause him to play poorly. Pierre has to deal with those issues in time to help Canada win the World Cup. The theme of Soviet hockey players wanting to flee their country and play in North America is also included.

The third season of the series focused on Le National de Québec dealing with serious financial difficulties and with an injury-plagued Pierre Lambert, leaving the future of Le National in Quebec in doubt. Pierre Lambert and his friends will have to start winning and find a way to keep Le National in Quebec.

== Cast ==
- Carl Marotte : Pierre Lambert
- Macha Méril : Maroussia Lambert
- Yvan Ponton : Jacques Mercier
- Marc Messier : Marc Gagnon
- Michel Forget : Gilles Guilbeault
- Sylvie Bourque : Linda Hébert
- Marina Orsini : Suzie Lambert
- Jean Harvey : Denis Mercure
- Marie-Chantal Labelle : Ginette Létourneau
- Denis Bouchard : Lucien Boivin
- Jean Deschênes : Paul Couture
- Thomas Donohue : Phil Aubry
- Eric Hoziel : Mac Templeton
- Jean-Sébastien Lord : Hugo Lambert
- Robert Marien : Robert Martin
- David Nerman : Steve Bradshaw
- Lise Thouin : Nicole Gagnon
- August Schellenberg : Allan Goldman
- Timothy Webber : Gary Bennett
- Sophie Renoir : Marie-Lou
- Daniela Akerblom : Geneviève
- Todd Field : Anders Johansson

== Background ==
Lance et Compte is a common Quebec French hockey expression, equivalent to the English "He shoots, he scores" (the latter was originally one of the catchphrases of hockey commentator Foster Hewitt). The team Le National is a direct copy of the real-life Nordiques, up to the logo (the Nordiques have the lower case letter "N" as symbol; the National has a capital "N"). The Dragons are themselves a copy of the Trois-Rivières Draveurs from the Quebec Major Junior Hockey League. Copies of real organizations are common in Québécois téléromans. Examples: La Presse newspaper is L'Express in the episode "Scoop" and the Sûreté du Québec police force is the Sûreté nationale in "Jasmine". However in the TV movies that aired immediately following the original series, the real junior team names are used including the Trois-Rivières Draveurs and the Shawinigan Cataractes. The show also became known was known for its occasional somewhat risqué love scenes.

== Incarnations ==
In addition to its English airing in Canada, the show was adapted in France as Cogne et gagne, with France French dubbing. A well known incarnation of Lance et Compte is the series of parody sketches of Rock et Belles Oreilles dubbed Snappe pis Bourdonne.

Several TV movies have been made in the franchise and were shown on TVA from 1991 to 1992.

1. Tous pour un
2. Le Crime de Lulu
3. Le Moment de vérité
4. Le Choix
5. Envers et contre tous
6. Le Retour du chat

A new season of the original series aired in 2001 featuring a new generation of players (and the presence of the original characters) and aired on TQS. Starting in 2004, five more seasons aired on TVA.

Lance et Compte: La Nouvelle Génération focuses on a new star named Danny Bouchard. Pierre Lambert is now retired and the agent of Bouchard. Le National de Québec have been playing very poorly for years now and if the team continues losing they might yet again be threatened to move out of the city. With the help of the new coaches, Le National have to find a way to win and fast.

La Reconquête focuses on the love life of Danny Bouchard and Marc Gagnon. Bouchard is rapidly turned into a man he is not by his new mistress Valérie Nantel and could result in a dramatic ending. Marc Gagnon also has to find a way to deal with his emotions as he still has feelings for his ex, Suzie Lambert.

In Lance et Compte: La Revanche, Pierre Lambert's son, Guy, is called up by Le National de Québec in the middle of the season. In his first game, he injures and kills a player from the Montreal Canadiens with a body check into the boards. The season primarily focuses on his trial and his love life but also on the revenge of Annie Girard, Danny Bouchard's widow, towards his mistress Valerie Nantel. The theme of steroids in sports has also been included in this installment.

Le Grand Duel, the show's seventh season aired on TVA in Fall 2009, it focuses on the rivalry between Montreal and Quebec City it also includes Suzie Lambert's battle with breast cancer. The theme of child sexual abuse in minor hockey is also included in the series.

A movie called Lance et Compte: Le Film ("Lance et Compte: The Movie") hit the theaters on November 26, 2010. It focused on the crash of the team bus between Roberval and Quebec City. At least half the team and coaches died from the crash.

The 8th season titled Lance et Compte: La Déchirure is a direct follow up to the movie.

The 9th and final season titled Lance et Compte: La Finale, starring Jason Roy Léveillée and Sarah Dagenais-Hakim as part of a new generation, was broadcast in 2015.

== See also ==
- List of Quebec television series
- Television of Quebec
- Culture of Quebec
