= Very Nice Day =

- French: Très belle journée
- Directed by: Patrice Laliberté
- Written by: Geneviève Beaupré; Nicolas Krief; Patrice Laliberté; Guillaume Laurin
- Produced by: Fanny Forest; Julie Groleau
- Starring: Guillaume Laurin; Sarah-Jeanne Labrosse; Marc Beaupré
- Cinematography: Christophe Dalpé
- Edited by: Olivier Binette; François Lamarche
- Music by: Marc-Antoine Barbier
- Production company: Couronne Nord
- Distributed by: H264 Distribution
- Release date: May 6, 2022
- Running time: 75 minutes
- Country: Canada
- Language: French

Very Nice Day (French: Très belle journée) is a Canadian thriller drama film, directed by Patrice Laliberté and released in 2022. The film stars Guillaume Laurin as Jérémie, a bicycle courier and conspiracy theory podcaster in Montreal; when Élyane (Sarah-Jeanne Labrosse), a social media influencer, moves in next door to him, he becomes obsessed with her and misses a delivery job, leading his boss Dom (Marc Beaupré) to launch a manhunt to find him.

The cast also includes Marc-André Grondin, Christine Beaulieu, Mathieu Dufresne and Sandrine Bisson.

The film opened theatrically on May 6, 2022.

== See also ==
List of films shot on mobile phones
