= Jean-Martin Gagnon =

Canadian film and television producer

Jean-Martin Gagnon is a Canadian film and television director and producer from Quebec. He is most noted as a producer of the film Gamma Rays (Les Rayons gamma), which was a Canadian Screen Award nominee for Best Picture at the 13th Canadian Screen Awards in 2025.

He was also director of the 2024 television documentary series Maisonneuve, which was the winner of the Prix Fonds Bell at the Abitibi-Témiscamingue International Film Festival in 2023 prior to its public release in 2024.

He directed a number of short films, and was an assistant director on Robert Morin films like Infiltration (Le problème d'infiltration)
