= Myriam Verreault =

Canadian film director and screenwriter

- Occupations: Film director screenwriter

Myriam Verreault is a Canadian film director and screenwriter. She is most noted for her 2019 film Kuessipan, for which she received a Canadian Screen Award nomination for Best Adapted Screenplay at the 8th Canadian Screen Awards, and two Prix Iris nominations for Best Director and Best Screenplay at the 22nd Quebec Cinema Awards.

Her other works have included the feature film West of Pluto (À l'ouest de Pluton), co-directed with Henry Bernadet, and the web documentary My Tribe Is My Life (Ma tribu c'est ma vie), as well as an editing credit on Olivier Higgins and Mélanie Carrier's 2013 documentary film Québékoisie.

In 2020 she was the patron and curator of the Festival Vues dans la tête de... film festival in Rivière-du-Loup.

In 2024, Verreault was announced as directing a film adaptation of Emmanuelle Pierrot's award-winning 2023 novel La version qui n'intéresse personne.

== See also ==
- List of female film and television directors
