= Réal Bossé =

Canadian actor

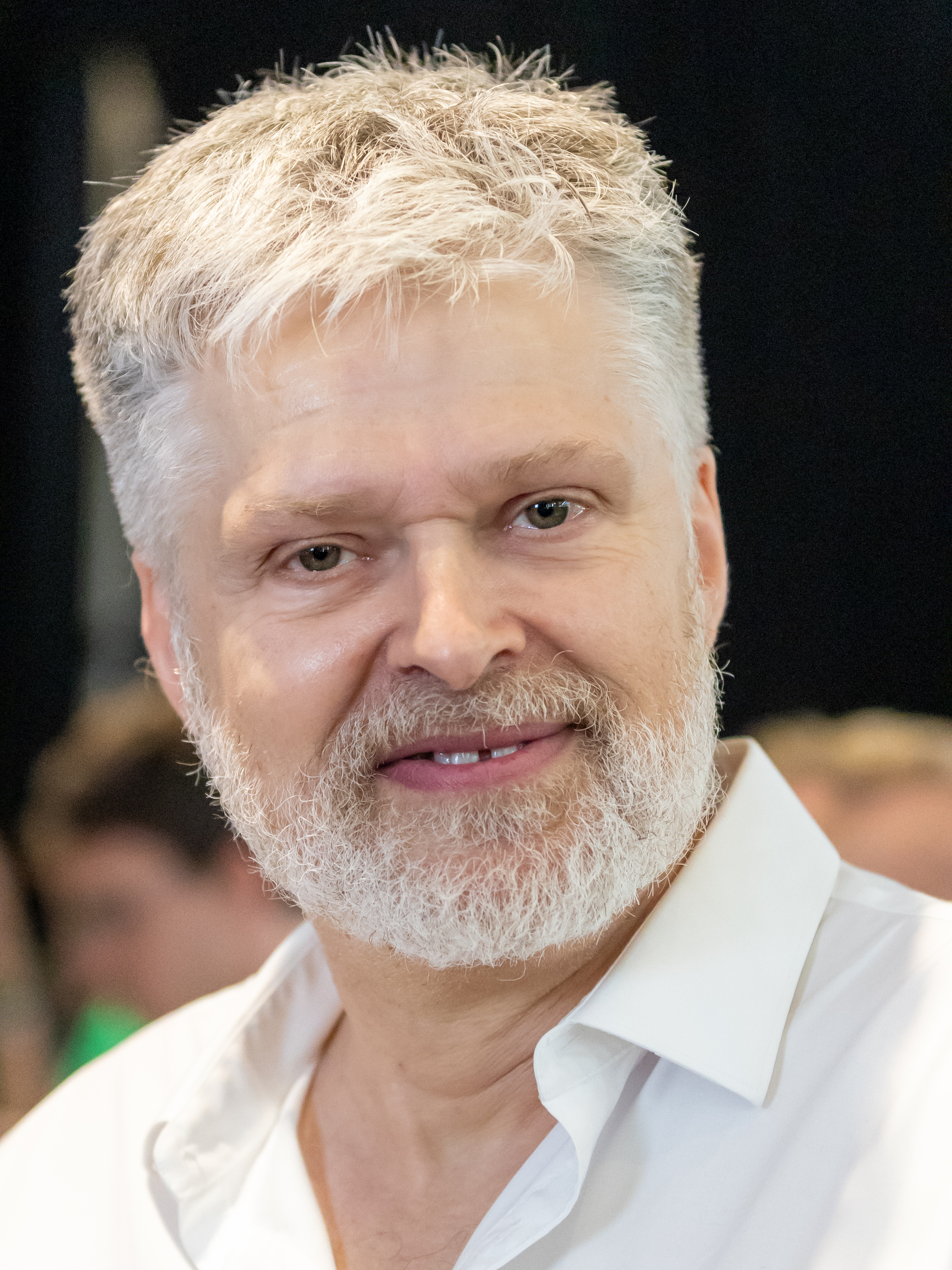
Réal Bossé, 2024

Réal Bossé is a Canadian actor from Quebec who performs mostly in francophone films and television. The son of farmers, Bossé grew up in Rivière-Bleue, Quebec. He won a Jutra Award in 2008 as Best Performance by an Actor in a Supporting Role in Continental, a Film Without Guns, as well as two Gémeaux Awards in 2011 for writing and acting in the television series 19-2. Bossé was part of the cast of The Decline (film), which was released in 2020. He is also a writer and actor on File D'Attente, a dramatic comedy airing in Quebec.

== Filmography ==
Year	Title	Role
1996	L'Oreille de Joé	Joé
1999	Sable Island (L'Île de sable)	
1999	Post Mortem	L'officier de police
2000	The Bottle (La Bouteille)	Réal
2002	Asbestos	Jean Vaugeois
2002	The Marsh (Le Marais)	Le facteur
2002	Les Dangereux	Le guitariste
2003	Gaz Bar Blues	Nelson
2003	Seducing Doctor Lewis (La Grande Séduction)	Denis Lacoste
2004	Happy Camper (Camping sauvage)	Bouton
2004	Dans une galaxie près de chez vous	Serge
2004	Le Golem de Montréal	Le Golem
2007	Nitro	Coordonnateur d'organes
2007	The 3 L'il Pigs (Les 3 P'tits Cochons)	L'ambulancier
2007	Continental, a Film Without Guns (Continental, un film sans fusil)	Louis
2008	Dans une galaxie près de chez vous 2	Serge
2009	The Canadiens, Forever (Pour toujours, les Canadiens !)	Marc
2016	Kiss Me Like a Lover (Embrasse-moi comme tu m'aimes)	Elphège Allard
2017	Innocent	L'avocat
2018	The Far Shore (Dérive)	André Beauregard
2020	The Decline (Jusqu'au déclin)	Alain
2023	Jour de merde	Gaétan Dubois
2024	Ababooned (Ababouiné)	
