= Henry Bernadet =

Canadian film director and screenwriter

Henry Bernadet is a Canadian filmmaker and screenwriter from Quebec, whose solo directorial debut film Gamma Rays (Les Rayons gamma) was released in 2023.

Originally from Quebec City, he made a number of short films as an independent filmmaker before co-directing the feature film West of Pluto (À l'ouest de Pluton) with Myriam Verreault in 2008.

He subsequently moved to Montreal to study film at Concordia University, and directed further short films, and television series episodes, before making Gamma Rays. He cast the film by approaching Georges-Vanier secondary school in the Montreal borough of Villeray to seek out students in the school's theatre program, and working with them to create a film that would depict stories drawn in part from their own experiences as members of racialized minority groups.

Gamma Rays was a shortlisted finalist for the 2024 Prix collégial du cinéma québécois, and Bernadet, Marie-Anne Sergerie and Victor Tremblay-Blouin received a Prix Iris nomination for Best Casting at the 26th Quebec Cinema Awards. He received a Canadian Screen Award nomination for Best Director at the 13th Canadian Screen Awards in 2025, as well as a nomination for Best Original Screenplay with cowriters Nicolas Krief and Isabelle Brouillette.
