= The Listener (TV series) =

Canadian television series, 2009–2014

- Genre: Low fantasy Drama
- Created by: Michael Amo
- Starring: Craig Olejnik; Ennis Esmer; Mylène Dinh-Robic; Lisa Marcos; Lauren Lee Smith; Rainbow Sun Francks; Peter Stebbings; Anthony Lemke; Tara Spencer-Nairn; Melanie Scrofano; Ingrid Kavelaars; Kris Holden-Ried
- Country of origin: Canada
- Original language: English
- No. of seasons: 5
- No. of episodes: 65 (list of episodes)

Production
- Executive producers: Christina Jennings; Scott Garvie; Karen Troubetzkoy; Peter Mohan
- Production locations: Toronto, Ontario, Canada
- Running time: 38 to 43 minutes (2,300 to 2,600 s)
- Production companies: Shaftesbury Films; CTV; Fox International Channels

Original release
- Network: CTV
- Release: March 3, 2009 – August 18, 2014

The Listener is a Canadian fantasy drama television series created by Michael Amo. The series stars Craig Olejnik as Toby Logan, a paramedic with telepathic powers who finds himself consulting with law enforcement to make a change in the world by helping others while listening to the thoughts of victims and criminals, and seeing images that they saw.

The series was broadcast in Canada on CTV and was produced by Shaftesbury Films, in conjunction with CTV and Fox International Channels.

The series premiered on CTV on March 3, 2009. CTV renewed the series for four more seasons, each consisting of 13 episodes, premiering February 8, 2011, May 30, 2012, May 29, 2013, and May 26, 2014. In August 2014, CTV announced that they had canceled the show after five seasons. The series finale aired on August 18, 2014.

== Plot ==
Season	Episodes	Originally released	
Season	Episodes	First released	Last released
1	13	March 3, 2009	May 26, 2009
2	13	February 8, 2011	August 31, 2011
3	13	May 30, 2012	September 12, 2012
4	13	May 29, 2013	August 28, 2013
5	13	May 26, 2014	August 18, 2014

=== Season One (2009) ===
Toby is a 28-year-old first-year paramedic who never knew his father and grew up in foster homes. Until now, Toby has kept secret his premonitions and his ability to listen to people's surface thoughts, only discussing them with his confidant and former counselor, Dr. Ray Mercer (Colm Feore). While he and his partner Osman "Oz" Bey (Ennis Esmer) cross the city of Toronto in an ambulance, Toby helps people in crisis and gradually comes to terms with his past. With the help of Detective Charlie Marks (Lisa Marcos) and his on-and-off girlfriend Olivia Fawcett (Mylène Dinh-Robic), an ER doctor, Toby realizes that he can use his gift to help other people.

=== Season Two (2011) ===
It's a year and a half later and Toby has finally come to terms with his telepathic powers and is still working with his paramedic partner Osman Bey. While assisting with an undercover case investigated by the Integrated Investigative Bureau (a special unit of the Royal Canadian Mounted Police), Toby reveals his gift to Sgt. Michelle McCluskey (Lauren Lee Smith). Despite her initial skepticism, she realizes that Toby's special abilities could be her team's secret weapon. So alongside his paramedic work, Toby joins Michelle and other members of the Integrated Investigation Bureau (IIB) to help solve some of their most difficult and high-profile cases ranging from suspicious homicides to cases of arms dealing. But the price to pay for having such a gift is the emotional and physical effects of delving into some of the most deranged criminal minds out there and it is his old flame Dr Olivia Fawcett who helps him deal with his problems.

=== Season Three (2012) ===
Toby stopped being a confidential informant for IIB after Elizabeth Simmonds was killed. He had been having intense headaches that Olivia said could kill him. He finds himself in trouble again after he goes into the bank that's about to be robbed. He decides to go into the bank after withdrawing cash and Michelle and Dev race to team up with him and prevent the robbery. Klein finds out about his abilities after he demands to know why Michelle and Dev are so overprotective of Toby. It isn't until after the guard who was shot tells Michelle personal details about the robbers that he begins to believe it. He makes a deal to start a unit for cases that are either cold and/or can't be solved by normal procedures. Toby joins IIB as a special consultant, working for the IIB the majority of the time, while picking up shifts as a paramedic.

=== Season Four (2013) ===
Toby's personal life heats up as his relationship grows with crime reporter Tia Tremblay (Melanie Scrofano), who is inexplicably the one person he cannot read. Sgt. Michelle McCluskey struggles through a complicated marriage with her husband (Kris Holden-Ried), while IIB head Alvin Klein (Peter Stebbings) attempts to protect himself and his team from the political maneuverings of the ambitious new police superintendent, Nichola Martell (Ingrid Kavelaars). Meanwhile, the new director of emergency services Oz Bey realizes that being the boss is harder than he expected.

=== Season Five (2014) ===
In the final season, Michelle becomes the mother of a little girl with her husband Adam, whereas Dev begins to be interested in Alex Kendrick, a new scientist working for IIB. Oz left his job as a paramedic and is now the owner of a restaurant, and Toby continues his relationship with Tia. Klein gets a promotion and leaves the head of the team to somebody that Toby already knows.

== Cast ==
=== Main ===
- Craig Olejnik as Toby Logan
- Ennis Esmer as Osman "Oz" Bey
- Mylène Dinh-Robic as Dr. Olivia Fawcett (seasons 1–3)
- Lisa Marcos as Det. Charlie Marks (season 1)
- Anthony Lemke as Det. Sgt. Brian Becker (season 1, recurring; season 5)
- Lauren Lee Smith as Sergeant Michelle McCluskey (seasons 2–5)
- Rainbow Sun Francks as Corp. Dev Clark (seasons 2–5)
- Peter Stebbings as Alvin Klein (seasons 2–4)
- Melanie Scrofano as Tia Tremblay (season 3, recurring; seasons 4–5)
- Kris Holden-Ried as Adam Reynolds (season 2, recurring; seasons 4–5)

=== Also starring ===
- Arnold Pinnock as George Ryder (seasons 1–3)
- Tara Spencer-Nairn as Nurse Sandy (seasons 2–4)
- Rachel Skarsten as Elyse (seasons 2–3)
- Ingrid Kavelaars as Nichola Martell (seasons 4–5)
- Natalie Krill as Alex Kendrick (season 5)

=== Recurring ===
- Colm Feore as Ray Mercer (season 1)
- Lara Jean Chorostecki as Toby's mother/Mya (season 1)
- John Fleming as Young Toby (season 1)

=== Crossover appearance ===
In episode 8 of the third season, Flashpoint character Michaelangelo "Spike" Scarlatti crossed over in a brief scene in which he was leaving the hospital after getting medical attention and interacted with Osman "Oz" Bey who had just brought a patient to the hospital.

== Production ==
The series is produced by Shaftesbury Films, in conjunction with CTV (seasons 1–4), Space (seasons 1–2), and Fox International Channels (seasons 2–4).

The series was created by Michael Amo. The pilot episode was directed by Clement Virgo. Production began in spring 2008.

Production for the second season began in September 2010 and ended in February 2011.

With the delayed second season came several production changes. The entire writing staff was replaced, and Michael Amo and Dennis Heaton have been replaced by Jason Sherman and Wil Zmak.

In terms of storylines and overall tone, star Craig Olejnik has said that "season two is more mature, stronger, smoother, and it really picks up... it really moves into a whole new world." Examples of this "new world" include how Toby finds himself in cases. In season one, the majority of cases in which Toby was involved were approached by Toby. That is, Toby, as a paramedic, was called to a location and found himself wrapped inside of a case. On the other hand, season two sees Toby approached by Sergeant McCluskey in most cases. In addition, season one had more of a mysterious, conspiracy sci-fi theme whereas season two has, as star Lauren Lee Smith states, "no real sci-fi aspect to it... It’s a guy who can read people’s minds and he helps the cops out with that." Season two nearly abandons Toby's search for his mother and an understanding of his powers. Colm Feore's character is gone, and the telepathic link is only through Toby solving crimes. Rather than try to discover what has happened to his mother and to learn more about his psychic sense, Toby "further embraces his telepathic powers to help solve criminal investigations". Season three continues the strictly procedural trend, with Toby becoming more officially involved with Sgt. McCluskey's position in IIB.

== Broadcast ==
=== Fox International ===
Fox International Channels premiered the series in the first week of March 2009 simultaneously in over 180 territories, making it the first-ever global premiere. This also meant that the series premiered three months before it premiered in Canada and the U.S.

=== NBCUniversal International Networks ===
The series began airing on NBCUniversal International Networks’s 13th Street in France.

=== Canada ===
The series was broadcast in Canada on CTV. It premiered on CTV on June 3, 2009.

CTV renewed the series for a second season, premiering February 8, 2011, and a third premiering May 30, 2012.

On July 25, 2012, Bell Media announced the series was ordered for a fourth season. It premiered May 29, 2013.

On October 7, 2013, CTV renewed the series for a fifth and final season consisting of 13 episodes. It premiered on Monday, May 26, 2014. In August 2014, CTV announced that they had canceled the show. The series finale aired on August 18, 2014 at 9 p.m.

Series star Craig Olejnik said in a ctv.ca finale interview that "I think (executive producer) Peter Mohan and the writers did a good job of wrapping up some of the bigger ideas that we have presented. Something comes full circle that people have been waiting for, for a long time".

=== United States ===
The series premiered on NBC in the U.S. on June 4, 2009. It was dropped after airing 7 episodes (of the 13-episode season) due to poor ratings, with the remaining episodes being made available for viewing online at NBC.com and Hulu.com. In 2011, it was announced that Ion Television had purchased the rights to the first two seasons of the series to be aired in 2012, with an option to purchase successive seasons. Then in 2014, ION Television signed on to become co-producer to the show. In November 2014, ION Television acquired the rights to Season 5. In late 2018, it began airing on syndication and TV stations such as WWOR-TV in New York City, WPVI in Philadelphia, KBCW (now KPYX) in San Francisco, KMAX-TV in Sacramento, KDOC-TV in Los Angeles, and WSBK-TV in Boston, among others.

=== United Kingdom ===
The series premiered on FX in the U.K on March 8, 2009, with season two returning March 1, 2011.

=== Australia ===
The series premiered on GO! in Australia on March 3, 2010. However, it was taken off the air twice due to low ratings. The series was later purchased by SoHo (formerly W) who have broadcast the first three seasons. Season 4 premiered on SoHo on August 5, 2013, with season 5 returning August 4, 2014.

== Home media ==
Season one of The Listener was released on DVD in the U.K. for Region 2 and Region 4 on September 13, 2010.

== Reception ==
In the U.S., it received mixed-to-negative reviews from television critics. On the review aggregator website Rotten Tomatoes, 31% of 13 critics' reviews are positive, with an average rating of 4.5/10. The website's consensus reads: "Despite a good premise, The Listener's narrative is too unoriginal and uninteresting to turn its potential into a truly compelling show." Metacritic, which uses a weighted average, assigned the film a score of 42 out of 100, based on 14 critics, indicating "mixed or average" reviews. NBC then pulled the show off the air after the July 23, 2009 airing of the episode "Inside the Man" due to low ratings.

In Italy, The Listener not only grew the timeslot average by 470%, according to research company Auditel/AGB, but it was the second-most watched show ever on Fox.

== See also ==
- Medium
- Seeing Things
- Tru Calling
