= 4th Canadian Screen Awards =

4th year of awards given by the Academy of Canadian Cinema & Television

- Date: March 13, 2016
- Location: Sony Centre for the Performing Arts, Toronto
- Hosted by: Norm Macdonald

Highlights
- Most awards: Film: Room (9); TV: The Book of Negroes (11)
- Most nominations: Film: Room (11); TV: Schitt's Creek (15)
- Best Motion Picture: Room
- Best Dramatic Series: 19-2
- Best Comedy Series: Schitt's Creek

Television/radio coverage
- Network: CBC
- Produced by: Barry Avrich

The 4th Canadian Screen Awards was held on March 13, 2016, to honour achievements in Canadian film, television, and digital media production in 2015.

Nominations were announced on January 19, 2016. Throughout the week before the main ceremony, awards in many technical categories were presented in a series of galas.

During the ceremony, host Norm Macdonald suggested the award be called the Candy in honour of late Canadian actor John Candy, comparable to the Academy Awards long being known as Oscars. The nickname has still not been officially adopted by the Academy of Canadian Cinema and Television, although academy chair Martin Katz personally endorsed it in a follow-up interview with the Toronto Star.

== Pre-show ==
Leading into the March 13 ceremony, comedian Steve Patterson hosted a special called The Great Canadian Screen Test, quizzing people in the streets of Toronto about the nominated films and who they thought should win the awards in various categories.

== Film ==
Motion Picture	Direction
Room — Ed Guiney, David Gross; Brooklyn — Pierre Even, Marie-Claude Poulin, Finola Dwyer, Amanda Posey; Corbo — Félize Frappier; The Demons (Les Démons) — Philippe Lesage; Felix and Meira (Félix et Meira) — Sylvain Corbeil, Nancy Grant; The Forbidden Room — Phoebe Greenberg, Penny Mancuso, Phyllis Laing, David Christensen, Guy Maddin; My Internship in Canada (Guibord s'en va-t-en guerre) — Luc Déry, Kim McCraw; Our Loved Ones (Les Êtres chers) — Sylvain Corbeil, Nancy Grant; Remember — Robert Lantos, Ari Lantos; Sleeping Giant — Karen Harnisch, Andrew Cividino, Marc Swenker, James Vandewater, Aaron Yeger	Lenny Abrahamson, Room; Andrew Cividino, Sleeping Giant; Anne Émond, Our Loved Ones (Les Êtres chers); Maxime Giroux, Felix and Meira (Félix et Meira); Philippe Lesage, The Demons (Les Démons)
Actor in a leading role	Actress in a leading role
Jacob Tremblay, Room; Maxim Gaudette, Our Loved Ones (Les Êtres chers); Jasmin Geljo, The Waiting Room; Christopher Plummer, Remember; Rossif Sutherland, River	Brie Larson, Room; Céline Bonnier, The Passion of Augustine (La Passion d'Augustine); Leah Fay Goldstein, Diamond Tongues; Karelle Tremblay, Our Loved Ones (Les Êtres chers); Hadas Yaron, Felix and Meira (Félix et Meira)
Actor in a supporting role	Actress in a supporting role
Nick Serino, Sleeping Giant; Waris Ahluwalia, Beeba Boys; Irdens Exantus, My Internship in Canada (Guibord s'en va-t-en guerre); Patrick Hivon, Ville-Marie; Tony Nardi, Corbo	Joan Allen, Room; Cynthia Ashperger, The Waiting Room; Christine Beaulieu, The Mirage (Le Mirage); Balinder Johal, Beeba Boys; Mylène Mackay, Endorphine
Original Screenplay	Adapted Screenplay
Benjamin August, Remember; Anne Émond, Our Loved Ones (Les Êtres chers); Philippe Falardeau, My Internship in Canada (Guibord s'en va-t-en guerre); Matthew Hansen, Zoom; André Turpin, Endorphine	Emma Donoghue, Room; Josh Epstein and Kyle Rideout, Eadweard; Wiebke von Carolsfeld, The Saver
Feature Length Documentary	Short Documentary
Hurt — Peter Gentile, Alan Zweig; The Amina Profile — Isabelle Couture, Nathalie Cloutier, Hugo Latulippe, Michel St-Cyr, Guy Villeneuve, Colette Loumède; Hadwin's Judgement — Sasha Snow, Elizabeth Yake, David Allen, David Christensen, Yves J. Ma, Tracey Friesen; How to Change the World — Jerry Rothwell, Al Morrow, Bous De Jong, John Murray, Jonny Persey, Stewart Le Maréchal, David Nicholas Wilkinson, John Brunton, Barbara Bowlby; Last of the Elephant Men — Daniel Ferguson, Arnaud Bouquet, Ian Oliveri, Ian Quenneville, Nathalie Barton, Karim Samai, Laurent Mini	Bacon and God's Wrath — Sol Friedman; The Little Deputy — Trevor Anderson, Blake McWilliam; Quiet Zone — David Bryant, Julie Roy, Karl Lemieux; Rebel (Bihttoš) — Elle-Máijá Tailfeathers, Laura Good; World Famous Gopher Hole Museum — Chelsea McMullan, Douglas Nayler
Live Action Short Drama	Animated Short
She Stoops to Conquer — Zack Russell, Marianna Khoury; Blue Thunder (Bleu tonnerre) — Philippe David Gagné, Jean-Marc E. Roy; Mynarski Death Plummet (Mynarski chute mortelle) — Matthew Rankin, Gabrielle Tougas-Fréchette; Overpass (Viaduc) — Patrice Laliberté; Roberta — Catherine Chagnon, Caroline Monnet	The Ballad of Immortal Joe — Hector Herrera, Pazit Cahlon; Carface (Autos Portraits) — Claude Cloutier, Julie Roy; BAM — Howie Shia, Michael Fukushima, Maral Mohammadian; In Deep Waters (Dans les eaux profondes) — Sarah Van den Boom, Julie Roy, Richard Van den Boom; The Sleepwalker (Sonámbulo) — Theodore Ushev
Art Direction/Production Design	Cinematography
Ethan Tobman and Mary Kirkland, Room; Louisa Schabas, Felix and Meira (Félix et Meira); Galen Johnson, Brigitte Henry, Chris Lavis and Maciek Szczerbowski, The Forbidden Room; Ken Rempel, Kathy McCoy and Erik Gerlund, Forsaken; Arvinder Grewal, Steve Shewchuk and Larry Spittle, Hyena Road	Yves Bélanger, Brooklyn; Sara Mishara, Felix and Meira (Félix et Meira); Rene Ohashi, Forsaken; Karim Hussain, Hyena Road; Danny Cohen, Room
Costume Design	Editing
Joanne Hansen, Beeba Boys; Judy Jonker, Corbo; Christopher Hargadon, Forsaken; Katelynd Johnston, Hyena Road; Arabella Bushnell, Songs She Wrote About People She Knows	Nathan Nugent, Room; Renée Beaulieu, Adrien (Le Garagiste); David Wharnsby, Hyena Road; Mathieu Bouchard-Malo, Our Loved Ones (Les Êtres chers); James Vandewater, Sleeping Giant
Overall Sound	Sound Editing
Lou Solakofski, Ian Rankin, Joe Morrow, Russ Dyck, Graham Rogers, James Bastable, André Azoubel, Don White and Jack Heeren, Hyena Road; Sylvain Brassard, Arnaud Têtu, Pascal Van Strydonck and Olivier Léger, Adrien (Le Garagiste); Bernard Gariépy Strobl, Daniel Bisson, Jean-Charles Desjardins and François Grenon, Endorphine; Lou Solakofski, Kirk Lynds, Kristian Bailey, Don White, Jack Heeren, Rob Coxford and Peter Caristedt, Into the Forest; Bernard Gariépy Strobl, Daniel Bisson, Claude La Haye and Benoît Leduc, My Internship in Canada (Guibord s'en va-t-en guerre)	Jane Tattersall, David McCallum, Martin Gwynn Jones, Barry Gilmore, David Evans, David Rose, Brennan Mercer, Ed Douglas, Kevin Banks, Goro Koyama and Andy Malcolm, Hyena Road; Benoît Dame, Adrien (Le Garagiste); Sylvain Bellemare, Claire Pochon, Jérôme Décarie and François Senneville, Endorphine; Mark Gingras and Jill Purdy, Forsaken; John Gurdebeke and David Rose, The Forbidden Room
Achievement in Music: Original Score	Achievement in Music: Original Song
Michael Brook, Brooklyn; Michel Corriveau, Anna; François Dompierre, The Passion of Augustine (La Passion d'Augustine); Stephen Rennicks, Room; Chris Gestrin, Songs She Wrote About People She Knows	Jenny Salgado, "C'est aujourd'hui que je sors" — Scratch; Peter Katz and Karen Kosowski, "Where the Light Used to Be" — 88; Martin Léon, "Red and Yellow" — Our Loved Ones (Les Êtres chers); Noah Reid, "People Hold On" — People Hold On; Kris Elgstrand, "Asshole Dave" — Songs She Wrote About People She Knows
Make-Up	Visual Effects
Sid Armour, Room; Catherine Beaudoin, Anna; David Scott and Trina Brink, Backcountry; Gail Kennedy, Rochelle Parrent and Jojo Preece, Forsaken; Jayne Dancose, Debra Johnson and Charles Porlier, Hyena Road	Phil Jones, Sarah Wormsbecher, Eric Doiron, Anthony DeChellis, Lon Molnar, Geoff D.E. Scott, Nathan Larouche and Mark Fordham, Hyena Road; Darren Wall, Borealis; Alain Lachance and Eve Brunet, Endorphine; Eric Doiron, Sarah Wormsbecher, Nathan Larouche, Anthony DeChellis, Geoff D.E. Scott, Jason Snea, Joel Chambers, Kaiser Thomas, Lon Molnar and Rob Kennedy, Remember; Marcelo Alves de Souza, Paulo Barcellos, Adams Carvalho, George Schall, Luis Dourado, Emerson Bonadias, Diego Moreira, Luciano Santa Barbara, Thiago Sá and Luis Dreyfuss, Zoom
Best Cinematography in a Documentary	Best Editing in a Documentary
Arnaud Bouquet, Last of the Elephant Men; Simon Schneider and Sasha Snow, Hadwin's Judgement; Daniel Grant and Amar Arhab, The Messenger; Thomas Burstyn, Some Kind of Love; Léna Mill-Reuillard and Étienne Roussy, Welcome to F.L. (Bienvenue à F.L.)	James Scott, How to Change the World; Geoffrey Boulangé and Sophie Deraspe, The Amina Profile; Elric Robichon, Last of the Elephant Men; Louis-Martin Paradis, The Price We Pay; Emmanuelle Lane, Welcome to F.L. (Bienvenue à F.L.)
Special awards
Best First Feature: Jamie M. Dagg, River; Discovery Award: Yosef Baraki, Mina Walking; Golden Screen Award: Snowtime! (La Guerre des tuques 3D)

== Television ==
=== Programs ===
Drama series	Comedy series
19-2; Blackstone; Motive; Saving Hope; X Company	Schitt's Creek; Mr. D; Mohawk Girls; Tiny Plastic Men; Young Drunk Punk
Animated program or series	Documentary program
Rocket Monkeys; Endangered Species; Numb Chucks; Slugterra	Sol; Okpik's Dream; Two of a Kind; Why Horror?
Children's or youth fiction	Children's or youth non-fiction
Degrassi; Annedroids; Full Out; Max & Shred	Finding Stuff Out; Giver; Tiny Talent Time
Dramatic Mini-Series or TV Movie	History Documentary Program or Series
The Book of Negroes; First Response; Forget and Forgive; Kept Woman; Studio Black!	Vietnam: Canada's Shadow War; Biblical Conspiracies; Mummies Alive; Tricks on the Dead: The Story of the Chinese Labour Corps in WWI
International Drama	Lifestyle Program or Series
Vikings; Jonathan Strange & Mr Norrell	Income Property; Buy It, Fix It, Sell It; Carnival Eats; Masters of Flip; Survivorman Bigfoot
Music Program or Series	Biography or Arts Documentary Program or Series
We Day 2014; John Mann Here and Now; The Spirit of Christmas with Kevin Pauls and Friends	Balletlujah; Traceable; Reelside
Pre-School Program or Series	Reality/Competition Program or Series
Odd Squad; Hi Opie!; Kate & Mim-Mim; PAW Patrol; You and Me	The Amazing Race Canada; Big Brother Canada; Dragon's Den; Game of Homes; MasterChef Canada
Science or Nature Documentary Program or Series	Social/Political Documentary Program (Donald Brittain Award)
The Nature of Things: "The Great Human Odyssey"; Bad Coyote; The Nature of Things: "The Cholesterol Question"; The Nature of Things: "Gorilla Doctors"; The Water Brothers	Sugar Coated; 15 to Life: Kenneth's Story; Anti-Social Limited; Danny; Human Harvest
Factual Program or Series	Variety or sketch comedy program or series
Still Standing; Emergency; Ice Pilots NWT; Jade Fever; Million Dollar Critic	Rick Mercer Report; Canada's Walk of Fame 2014; Just for Laughs: All Access; This Hour Has 22 Minutes; The Second City Project
Live entertainment special	Talk program or series
2015 Juno Awards; 2015 MuchMusic Video Awards; 2015 Pan American Games Opening Ceremony; ET Canada: New Year's Eve in Niagara Falls	The Marilyn Denis Show; After the Race: Finale; eTalk's Ultimate Oscars Guide 2015; The Social
Performing arts program	Diversity Award
King Lear; King John	Canada in Perspective
Golden Screen Award for TV Drama/Comedy	Golden Screen Award for TV Reality Show
Corner Gas: The Movie; The Book of Negroes; Murdoch Mysteries; Rookie Blue; Saving Hope	The Amazing Race Canada; Big Brother Canada; Canada's Smartest Person; Dragon's Den; MasterChef Canada
Icon Award
This Hour Has 22 Minutes

=== Actors ===
Lead actor, drama	Lead actress, drama
Ari Millen, Orphan Black; Aaron Poole, Strange Empire; Adrian Holmes, 19-2; Ben Bass, Rookie Blue; Jared Keeso, 19-2	Tatiana Maslany, Orphan Black; Jennie Raymond, Sex & Violence; Kristin Lehman, Motive; Megan Follows, Reign; Missy Peregrym, Rookie Blue
Lead actor, comedy	Lead actress, comedy
Eugene Levy, Schitt's Creek; Gerry Dee, Mr. D; Dan Levy, Schitt's Creek; Dave Foley, Spun Out	Catherine O'Hara, Schitt's Creek; Brittany LeBorgne, Mohawk Girls; Annie Murphy, Schitt's Creek; Belinda Cornish, Tiny Plastic Men
Lead actor, television film or miniseries	Lead actress, television film or miniseries
Lyriq Bent, The Book of Negroes; Geraint Wyn Davies, Antony and Cleopatra; Joris Jarsky, First Response; Tom McCamus, King John; Colm Feore, King Lear	Aunjanue Ellis, The Book of Negroes; Yanna McIntosh, Antony and Cleopatra; Seana McKenna, King John; Jennifer Beals, A Wife's Nightmare
Supporting actor, drama	Supporting actress, drama
Torben Liebrecht, X Company; Bruce Ramsay, 19-2; Callum Dunphy, Sex & Violence; Conrad Pla, 19-2; Woody Jeffreys, Strange Empire	Shailyn Pierre-Dixon, The Book of Negroes; Julia Taylor Ross, Saving Hope; Laurence Leboeuf, 19-2; Maria Doyle Kennedy, Orphan Black; Martha Burns, Remedy
Supporting actor, comedy	Supporting actress, comedy
Chris Elliott, Schitt's Creek; Mark Little, Mr. D; Darrin Rose, Mr. D; Al Mukadam, Spun Out; Atticus Mitchell, Young Drunk Punk	Emily Hampshire, Schitt's Creek; Bette MacDonald, Mr. D; Naomi Snieckus, Mr. D; Jennifer Robertson, Schitt's Creek; Tracy Ryan, Young Drunk Punk
Performance in a children's or youth program or series	Performance in a guest role, drama series
Aislinn Paul, Degrassi; Ana Golja, Full Out; Jordan Lockhart, Hi Opie!; Dalila Bela, Odd Squad; Madison Ferguson, The Stanley Dynamic	Christine Horne, Remedy; Brendan Meyer, Motive; Billy Boyd, Motive; Tony Nappo, Rookie Blue; Rick Okon, X Company
Performance in an animated program or series	Performance in a variety or sketch comedy program or series
Julie Lemieux, Numb Chucks; Adrian Lloyd, Chirp; Terry McGurrin, Numb Chucks; Dan Chameroy, Oh No! It's an Alien Invasion; Rob Tinkler, Trucktown	Kathleen Phillips, Pat Thornton, Patrice Goodman, Kevin Vidal, Alice Moran, Rob Norman and Norm Macdonald, Sunnyside; Cathy Jones, Shaun Majumder, Mark Critch and Susan Kent, This Hour Has 22 Minutes; Kayla Lorette, Marty Adams, Caitlin Howden, Tim Baltz, Sam Richardson and Steve Waltien, The Second City Project; Rick Mercer, Rick Mercer Report

=== News and information ===
News special	News reportage, local
Global News: Decision Alberta; CBC News Network: The Ottawa Shootings; CBC Newfoundland and Labrador: PC Leadership Special; CBC Toronto: Toronto Votes; CTV News: Shooting on Parliament Hill	Global News Calgary: "Taxi Assault" — Nancy Hixt, Dani Lantela, Lee Dillman; Global News Toronto: "Blind Rejection" — Christina Stevens, Mark Trueman; CBC News Halifax: "Rape Kits" — Angela MacIvor; CBC News Ottawa: "Parliament Hill Shooting: Searching for Answers" — Ashley Burke, Judy Trinh, Omar Dabaghi-Pacheco; CBC News Windsor: "Lil Secrett" — Robin Brown, Makda Ghebreslassie, Greg Layson
News reportage, national	Local newscast
Adrienne Arsenault, CBC News: The National: "Ebola"; Nahlah Ayed, CBC News: The National: "Charlie Hebdo"; Connie Walker, CBC News: The National: "Florida Therapy"; Janice Mackey Frayer, CTV National News: "Disaster in Nepal"; Tom Walters, CTV National News: "Standoff in Ferguson"	CTV News Vancouver; CBC News Halifax; CBC News Toronto; Global BC News Hour
National newscast	News information series
CTV National News; CBC News: The National; Global National	16:9; Marketplace; the fifth estate; W5
News anchor, local	News anchor, national
Andrew Chang, CBC News Vancouver; Adrian Harewood and Lucy van Oldenbarneveld, CBC News Ottawa; Dwight Drummond and Anne-Marie Mediwake, CBC News Toronto; Daryl McIntyre, CTV News Edmonton; Chris Gailus, Global BC News Hour	Ian Hanomansing, CBC News Now; Heather Hiscox, CBC News Now; Peter Mansbridge, The National; Lisa LaFlamme, CTV National News
Host or interviewer, news or information program or series	News or information program
Rosemary Barton, Power & Politics; Tom Harrington, Marketplace; Gillian Findlay, the fifth estate; Bob McKeown, the fifth estate; Tom Kennedy, W5	Marketplace: "Licence to Deceive"; 16:9: "Under Fire"; W5: "Abusive Care"; the fifth estate: "The Unmaking of Jian Ghomeshi"
Host in a children's, preschool or youth program or series	Host in a Variety, Lifestyle, Reality/Competition, or Talk Program or Series
Harrison Houde, Finding Stuff Out; Michael Lagimodiere, Giver; Kara Harun, TVOKids: The Space	Jon Montgomery, The Amazing Race Canada; Marci Ien, Canada AM; Jessi Cruickshank, Canada's Smartest Person; Giles Coren, Million Dollar Critic; Jonny Harris, Still Standing
News or information segment
W5: "Hands of God" — Victor Malarek, Mary Dartis, Litsa Sourtzis, André Lapalme, Jerry Vienneau, Brian Mellersh; Marketplace: "Vaccine Confusion" — Erica Johnson, Tiffany Foxcroft, Lindsay Sample, Tyana Grundig, Aileen McBride; CBC News: The National: "The Finish Line" — Paul Hunter, Carmen Merrifield, Dominique Banoun, Andy Hincenbergs, Jamie Hopkins, Sharon Wu; the fifth estate: "The Fear Within: Attack on the Hill" — Bob McKeown, Scott Anderson, Oleh Rumak, Allya Davidson, Alieen McBride; W5: "Gordie's Comeback" — Avis Favaro, Jerry Vienneau, Elizabeth St. Philip, Brian Mellersh, André Lapalme

=== Sports ===
Live sporting event coverage	Sports analysis or commentary
2015 IIHF World Junior Gold Medal Game (TSN); 2015 FIFA Women's World Cup (TSN); 2015 Stanley Cup Finals, Game 6 (Sportsnet)	Ray Ferraro and Bob McKenzie (TSN), 2015 IIHF World Junior Gold Medal Game; Jason deVos (TSN), 2015 FIFA Women's World Cup; Gregg Zaun (Sportsnet), Baseball Central; Craig Simpson (Sportsnet), Hockey Night in Canada
Sports host	Sports play-by-play
Andi Petrillo (CBC Sports), 2015 Pan Am Games; James Duthie (TSN), 2015 IIHF World Junior Gold Medal Game; Jay Janower (Global), 2015 Canadian Open	Luke Wileman (TSN), 2015 FIFA Women's World Cup; Chris Cuthbert (TSN), 2014 Grey Cup; Gord Miller (TSN), 2015 IIHF World Junior Gold Medal Game; Jim Hughson (Sportsnet), Hockey Night in Canada
Sports feature segment	Sports opening
TSN, "The Butterfly Child" — Ross Rheaume, James Duthie, Brent Blanchard, Devon Burns; TSN, "Bryan Murray" — Matt Cade, Michael Farber, Karl Roeder, Brent Blanchard, David Midgely; Sportsnet, "Family First: The Chris Sutter Story" — Marc Leblanc, George Skoutakis, Kirt Berry, Andrew Formentini; TSN, "Favela United" — Josh Shiaman, Rick Westhead, Darren Oliver, Devon Burns, Kevin Fallis; TSN, "The Stastny Brothers" — Josh Shiaman, Dave Naylor, Jason Wessel, Brent Blanchard	TSN, 2015 FIFA Women's World Cup — Matt Dunn, Michael Farber, Devon Burns, Darren Oliver, Steve Denheyer; CBC Sports, 2015 Pan American Games Opening Show — Paul McDougall, Karen Sebesta, Tim Thompson, Jeff Shelagy; Sportsnet, MLB Central's Baseball's Treasures — Stephen Paine; Sportsnet, 2015 NHL Draft — Marc Leblanc, Stephen Brunt, Mark Wade, George Skoutakis
Sports program or series	
Defector (Sportsnet) — Marc Leblanc, Jeremy McElhanney; the fifth estate: "The Pain Game: Drugs, Doctors and Pro Sports" (CBC) — Bob McKeown, Scott Anderson, Andrew Culbert, Liz Rosch; Have a Purpose: The Ian Jenkins Story (Sportsnet) — Marc Leblanc, Paul Sidhu, Mark Wade; The Perfect Storm: 1994 Montreal Expos (TSN) — Sean Menard; Sports on Fire (HBO Canada) — Kim Arnott, Andrew Barnsley, Jeff Aghassi, Pete McCormack, Kevin Foley, Mandy Spencer-Philips

=== Craft awards ===
Editorial research	Visual research
Nicole Reinert, Alexandra Byers, Greg McArthur, Zach Dubinsky, Chelsea Gomez and Joseph Loiero, The Fifth Estate: "The Mob and Michael Degroote"; Timothy Sawa and Lori Ward, CBC News: "Campus Sexual Assaults: The Fight to Get the Real Picture"; Erica Johnson, Lynn Burgess and Lindsay Sample, Marketplace: "Dispensing Danger"; Nathalie Bibeau, Sugar Coated; Larry Wong, Jordan Paterson, Judy Lam Maxwell and Vera Yuen, Tricks on the Dead: The Story of the Chinese Labour Corps in WWI	Gina Cali, The Nature of Things: "Jellyfish Rule"; Kristina Howard, The Great War Tour with Norm Christie: "The Vimy Pilgrimage"; Monica Penner, Nava Rastegar and Laura Blaney, Sugar Coated; Erin Chisholm, War Story: "Liberation"
Make-Up	Costume Design
Stephen Lynch and Sandy Sokolowski, Orphan Black: "Ruthless in Purpose, and Insidious in Method"; Lalette Littlejohn, Francesca Van der Feyst, Talia Barak and Koketso Mbuli, The Book of Negroes; Melissa Purino, Kept Woman; Colin Penman and Ryan Reed, Killjoys: "Bangarang"; Sue Upton and Gerald Altenburg, King Lear	Kate Carin, The Book of Negroes; Renata Morales, 2015 Pan American Games: Opening Ceremony; Carolyn N. Smith, King John; Beverly Wowchuk, Strange Empire: "Lonely Hearts"; Andrea Flesch, X Company: "Kiss of Death"
Photography in a comedy series	Photography in a documentary program or factual series
Gerald Packer, Schitt's Creek: "Honeymoon"; Ian Bibby, Mr. D: "Bizarro"; Gavin Smith, Young Drunk Punk: "Pilot"	Jordan Paterson and Norm Li, Tricks on the Dead: The Story of the Chinese Labour Corps in WWI; Sean White, Bahama Blue: "The Sand Flats"; Chris Belchevski, Blind Spot: Moments Unseen; Tim Hutchinson, The Secret Science of the Dog Park; Milan Podsedly, Songs of Freedom
Photography in a drama program or series	Photography in a lifestyle or reality program or series
Aaron Morton, Orphan Black: "Certain Agony of the Battlefield"; Gary Clarke, Gangland Undercover: "A Tough Prospect"; Mark Chow, Motive: "A Problem Like Maria"; Bruce Worrall, Strange Empire: "The Dark Rider"; Stephan Pehrsson, X Company: "Pilot/Camp X"	Ryan Shaw, The Amazing Race Canada: "Take Your Clue and Gooo!"; Geoff Lackner, Canada's Worst Driver: "Crash, Bang, Boom!"; Curtis Galindo-Orozco, Carnival Eats: "Indiana State Fair/Old Canal Days"; Jonathan Hoare, Food Factory USA: "McLovin It"; Wes Legge, Masters of Flip: "Fatherland"
Photography in a news or information program, series or segment	Photography in a variety or sketch comedy program or series
Jean-François Bisson, Losing Liberia; Glen Kugelstadt, CBC News: The National: "Quebec Volunteer in Nepal"; Kirk Neff, The Day the Wave Came; Jerry Vienneau, W5: "Feeding Hope"	D. Gregor Hagey, Sunnyside: "Top Hat"; David Fairfield, 2015 MuchMusic Video Awards; Ian Bibby, This Hour Has 22 Minutes: "11"; Alex Nadon, Juno Awards of 2015; Doug Koch, The Second City Project
Editing in a comedy program or series	Editing in a dramatic program or series
James Bredin, Schitt's Creek: "Surprise Party"; Patricia Brown, Mr. D: "Mafia Dad"; Ehren Davis, Mr. D: "Staff Hangover"; Trevor Ambrose, Young Drunk Punk: "Working for Cowboy"; Paul Winestock, Young Drunk Punk: "The Clash Is Coming"	Matthew Anas, Orphan Black: "Newer Elements of Our Defence"; Yvann Thibaudeau, 19-2: "School"; Lisa Binkley, Motive: "The Suicide Tree"; Jay Prychidny, Orphan Black: "Certain Agony of the Battlefield"; Aaron Marshall, Vikings: "Warrior's Fate"
Editing in a variety or sketch comedy program or series	Editing in a documentary program or series
Allan Maclean and Miles Davren, Rick Mercer Report: "Episode Three"; Kendall Nowe, Ron Bates, Todd Foster and Ken Petersen, This Hour Has 22 Minutes: "11"; Courtney Goldman and Jennifer Essex-Chew, Odd Squad: "Rise of the Hydraclops / O is Not for Old"; Mike Fly, The Second City Project	David New, Songs of Freedom; Bruce Lapointe, Bipolarized; Stefan Morel, Blind Spot: Moments Unseen; Étienne Gagnon, Fennario: The Good Fight; Nick Hector, War Story
Editing in a factual program or series	Editing in a reality or competition program or series
Al Manson, Hockey Wives: "Married to the Game"; Jonathan Wong, 16:9: "In Harm's Way"; Jorge Parra, Robert Kew and Tony Coleman, Still Standing: "Buxton"; Tony Kent, Sports on Fire: "Terrolympics"; Rob Chandler, Surviving Evil: "Nightmare Before Christmas"	Seth Poulin, Jonathan Dowler, Ben O'Neil, Burak Ozgan and Michael Tersign, The Amazing Race Canada: "Who's Feeling Sporty Now"; Ryan Monteith, Al Manson, Baun Mah and Jonathan Dowler, Big Brother Canada: "Finale"; Elizabeth Cabral, Chopped Canada: "Fowl Play"; Miles Davren and Allan Hughes, MasterChef Canada: "Wedding on the Waves"; Dana Alexander and John Meakin, Masters of Flip: "Prospect"
Production design/art direction in a fiction program or series	Production design/art direction in a non-fiction program or series
Jason Clarke, Ian Greig, Robert van de Coolwyk, Brian Glaser and Renee Filipova, The Book of Negroes; Ian Brock, Kim Zaharko and Andy Loew, Dark Matter: "Episode One"; Jean Bécotte, Kept Woman; Ross Dempster, Louise Roper and David Clarke, Motive: "Purgatory"; Phillip Barker, Robert Hepburn and Brad Milburn, Reign: "Acts of War"	Cole Paterson and Candise Paul, Tricks on the Dead: The Story of the Chinese Labour Corps in WWI; Bastien Alexandre, Jean Guibert and Bruce Rodgers, 2015 Pan American Games Opening Ceremony; Peter Faragher and Andy Roskaft, Big Brother Canada: "Finale"; Alex Nadon, Canada's Walk of Fame 2014; Alex Nadon, Juno Awards of 2015
Sound in a fiction program or series	Sound in a non-fiction program or series
Derek Mansveldt, David Rose, David McCallum, Martin Gwynn Jones, Joe Mancuso, Steve Hammond, Erik Culp, Frank Morrone, Scott Shepherd and Alexander Rosborough, The Book of Negroes; Robert Labrosse, Guillaume Boursier, Martin M Messier, Sébastien Bédard, Lori Paquet, Sabin Hudon, Jacques Plante and Jean Camden, 19-2: "School"; Christopher Guglick, John Laing, Mark Gingras, Herwig Gayer, Orest Sushko and Marilee Yorsten, Orphan Black: "History Yet to Be Written"; Jane Tattersall, Steve Medeiros, David McCallum, Dale Sheldrake, Martin Lee, Kirk Lynds, Yuri Gorbachow, Andy Malcolm, Goro Koyama, Jack Heeren, Daniel Birch and Sandra Fox, Vikings: "To the Gates!"; Alan deGraaf, Mike Woroniuk, Richard Anobile, Kevin Howard, Nathan Robitaille, J.R. Fountain, John D. Smith, Richard Calistan, Joe Mancuso, Steve Hammond, Erik Culp, Zenon Waschuk and Rob Hegedus, X Company: "Pilot - Camp X"	Peter Sawade, David Rose, L. Stu Young, Lou Solakofski, Martin Gwynn Jones, Krystin Hunter and Jane Tattersall, Songs of Freedom; Lance Schibler, Blind Spot: Moments Unseen; Tobias Haynes, Lynne Trépanier, Chris Leon and Bernard Gariépy Strobl, Sol; Brian Eymer and Steve Payne, Survivorman Bigfoot: "Klemtu"; Chris McIntosh, Brayden McCluskey and Aaron Tchir, Highway Thru Hell: "New Hell Old Hell"
Sound in a variety or animated program or series	Visual effects
Antonio Montano, Michael Nunan, Andrew Roberts, Kent Ford and Mark Vreeken, 2015 Pan American Games Opening Ceremony; Michael Juk, Gary Morgan and John Diemer, John Mann Here and Now; Mark Gingras, Adam Stein, John Laing, Dermain Finlayson, Keith Elliot and Rudy Michael, Pirate's Passage; Steve Moore, Lucas Roveda, John Laing, Mark Dejczak, Marilee Yorston, David Mercel and Leon Johnson, Sunnyside: "Top Hat"; Sean Pearson, Simon Berry, Michael Mancuso and Julia Snell, Trucktown: "Trucktown Rodeo"	Dennis Berardi, Dominic Remane, Michael Borrett, Ovidiu Cinazan, Paul Wishart, Jeremy Dineen, Engin Arslan, Ken MacKenzie, Bill Halliday, Leann Harvey, Maria Gordon and Julian Parry, Vikings: "To the Gates!"; Stephen Lebed, Winston Lee, JP Giamos, Mike Duffy, Charles Taylor, Geoff Sayer, Jeff Skochko and Rob Vandenhoek, Beauty and the Beast: "Bob & Carol & Vincent & Cat"; Tyler Foell, Kris Wood, Robert DM Smith, Winrik Haentjens, Gavin Jung, Brent Boulet, Iqbal Zafar, Yoga Kurniawan, Harshal Mistry, Arian Van Zyl, Cary Smith, Bethany Johnson and Michelle Brennen, Haven: "See No Evil"; Edward J. Taylor IV, Krista Allain, Chris Ross, Ben Mossman, Kyle Sim, Jason Gougeon, Somboun Souannhaphanh, Ran Long Wen, Yuhay-Ray Ng and Igor Avdyushin, Killjoys: "A Glitch in the System"; Geoff D.E. Scott, Sarah Wormsbecher, Lon Molnar, Eric Doiron, Nathan Larouche, Anthony DeChellis, Joel Chambers, Jason Snea, Kaiser Thomas and Jawahar Bhatti, Orphan Black: "History Yet to Be Written"
Casting	
Robin D. Cook, Andrea Kenyon, Randi Wells and Marissa Richmond, 19-2: "School"; Jenny Lewis and Sara Kay, Bitten: "Hell's Teeth"; Tina Gerussi and Sheila Lane, Mr. D: "Coach of the Year"; Maureen Webb and Colleen Bolton, Motive: "Six Months Later"; Jackie Lind, Strange Empire: "The Whiskey Trader"

=== Directing ===
Children's or youth	Comedy
Phil Earnshaw, Degrassi: "Finally, Pt. 2"; J. J. Johnson, Annedroids: "New Pals"; Jesse Shamata, Gaming Show (In My Parents' Garage): "All Night Long"; Craig Wallace, Odd Squad: "The One That Got Away"; Stefan Brogren, Open Heart: "Last Things First"	Paul Fox, Schitt's Creek: "The Cabin"; Jacob Tierney, Mr. D: "Staff Hangover"; Tracey Deer, Mohawk Girls: "What's Your Number"; Jerry Ciccoritti, Schitt's Creek: "Our Cup Runneth Over"; Ron Murphy, Young Drunk Punk: "The Clash Is Coming"
Documentary or factual series	Documentary program
Matt Shewchuk, Ice Pilots NWT: "D-Day"; Brian Rice, Fear Thy Neighbor: "Red Picket Fences"; Niobe Thompson, The Nature of Things: "The Great Human Odyssey: Rise of a Species"; Mick Grogan, Mummies Alive: "The Gunslinger Mummy"; Matthew Lochner and Raj Panikkar, Reelside: "Superheroes"	Barbara Willis Sweete, Songs of Freedom; Nadine Pequeneza, 15 to Life: Kenneth's Story; Jason Andrew Young, Bad Coyote; Shane Belcourt, Kaha:wi: The Cycle of Life; Marie-Hélène Cousineau and Susan Avingaq, Sol
Dramatic program or mini–series	Dramatic series
Clement Virgo, The Book of Negroes; Dylan Pierce, 40 Below and Falling; Philippe Gagnon, The Good Sister; Tristan Dubois, Forget and Forgive; Michel Poulette, Kept Woman	Daniel Grou, 19-2: "School"; Andy Mikita, Motive: "A Problem Like Maria"; Helen Shaver, Orphan Black: "Certain Agony of the Battlefield"; Helen Shaver, Vikings: "Born Again"; Kelly Makin, Vikings: "To the Gates"
Lifestyle program or mini–series	Live sporting event
Bob Haller, The Marilyn Denis Show; Josh Freed, Doc Zone: "Deluged by Data"; Marc Simard, Income Property" "Roz & Katherine"; Shel Piercy, Love It or List It Vancouver: "Nicole & Tony"; Les Stroud, Survivorman Bigfoot: "Searching the Southwest"	Andy Bouyoukos (TSN), 2015 IIHF World Junior Gold Medal Game; Andy Bouyoukos (TSN), 2014 Grey Cup; Jim Hough (CBC Sports), Spruce Meadows CP International Grand Prix
Reality or competition program or series	Variety or sketch comedy program or series
Rob Brunner, The Amazing Race Canada: "Penticton/Osoyoos"; Graeme Lynch, The Bachelor Canada: "Week 6: Tuscany"; Brian Quigley, Food Truck Face Off: "Charnow Park Chowdown"	Shelagh O'Brien, 2015 Pan American Games Opening Ceremony; John Keffer, 2015 MuchMusic Video Awards; Vivieno Caldenelli and Michael Lewis, This Hour Has 22 Minutes: "11"; Dave Russell, Juno Awards of 2015; Tim Hamilton, The Second City Project
Animated program or series
Jamie Whitney, PAW Patrol: "Pups Save a Talent Show/Pups Save the Corn Roast"; Richard Johnson and Andrew Duncan, Endangered Species: "Nutty Buddy Goes Nuts/The Fable"; Dave Brown, Numb Chucks: "Hooves Line Is It Anyways?"; J. Falconer, Rocket Monkeys: "Destroy All Bananas!"; Andrew Duncan and Clint Butler, Slugterra: "Slug Fu Showdown, Pt. 2"

=== Music ===
Non-fiction program or series	Original score for a program
Darren Fung, The Nature of Things: "The Great Human Odyssey: Rise of a Species"; Catalin Marin, Art of Darkness; Luke Doucet and Melissa McClelland, Blind Spot: Moments Unseen; Darren Fung, Danny; Oleksa Lozowchuck, Sol	Philip Miller, The Book of Negroes; Andrew Lockington, Pirate's Passage; Jay McCarrol, The Second City Project
Original score for a series	
Trevor Yuile, Orphan Black: "Certain Agony of the Battlefield"; Todor Kobakov, Bitten: "Nine Circles"; Robert Carli, Murdoch Mysteries: "On the Waterfront: Part One"; James Jandrisch, Sunnyside: "Top Hat"; Amin Bhatia and Ari Posner, X Company: "Trial by Fire"

=== Writing ===
Children's or youth	Comedy
Matt Huether, Degrassi: "Give Me One Reason"; Christin Simms and J. J. Johnson, Annedroids: "Parent Swap"; Edward Kay, Finding Stuff Out: "Poop"; Jesse Shamata, Evany Rosen and Eric Toth, Gaming Show (In My Parents' Garage): "All Night Long"; Tim McKeon, Odd Squad: "Training Day Part 1 / Training Day Part 2"	Dan Levy, Schitt's Creek: "Honeymoon"; Jesse Gabe, Mr. D: "Staff Hangover"; Cynthia Knight, Mohawk Girls: "Rez Balls"; Mike Short, Schitt's Creek: "Don't Worry, It's His Sister"; Chris Craddock, Tiny Plastic Men: "The Ex Factor"
Documentary	Dramatic program or miniseries
Nadine Pequeneza, 15 to Life: Kenneth's Story; Ryszard Hunka, Decoding Desire; Rob Ruzic, Mugshot; Marie-Hélène Cousineau and Dana Schoel, Sol; Colin McNeil, Sticks and Stones	Clement Virgo and Lawrence Hill, The Book of Negroes; Doug Barber and James Phillips, Forget and Forgive; Doug Barber and James Phillips, Kept Woman
Drama series	Factual program or series
Alex Levine, Orphan Black: "Scarred by Many Past Frustrations"; Jesse McKeown, 19-2: "Orphans"; Nikolijne Troubetzkoy and Bruce M. Smith, 19-2: "Borders"; Graeme Manson, Orphan Black: "The Weight of This Combination"; Denis McGrath, X Company: "Quislings"	Samantha Beck, Ice Pilots NWT: "D-Day"; Bryan Rice, Fear Thy Neighbor: "Red Picket Fences"; Mark Miller and Todd Serotiuk, Highway Thru Hell: "No Way Out"; Jonny Harris, Chuck Byrn and Nile Séguin, Still Standing: "Buxton"
Lifestyle or reality/competition program or series	Variety or sketch comedy program or series
Les Stroud, Survivorman Bigfoot: "The Legend of Klemtu Hill"; Chris Nelson, Ex-Wives of Rock: "Welcome (Back) to the Jungle"; Jenny Hawker and Anna Kowalski, Food Factory USA: "McLovin It"	Rick Mercer, Rick Currie, Greg Eckler, Chris Finn, Tim Steeves and George Westerholm, Rick Mercer Report: "Episode Eleven"; Mark Critch, Mike Allison, Bob Kerr, Jon Blair, Heidi Brander, Sonya Bell, Pat Dussault, Dean Jenkinson, Mary Walsh, Adam Christie and Jeremy Woodcock, This Hour Has 22 Minutes: "16"; Dan Redican, Gary Pearson, Kathleen Phillips, Alastair Forbes and Jan Caruana, Sunnyside: "Top Hat"
Animated program or series	
Mark Steinberg, Numb Chucks: "As the Worm Turns"; Mark Evestaff, Betsy Walters and Shawn Kalb, Dr. Dimensionpants: "Horn to Be Wild / Bravo Dimensionpants"; John Derevlany and Grant Sauvé, Endangered Species: "The Basement / Gull to Sleep"; Phil Ivanusic, Oh No! It's an Alien Invasion: "The Boogieguard"	

== Digital media ==
Original Interactive Production	Original Program or Series, Fiction
Highrise: Universe Within; Interactive Haikus; Together Tales Presents Capes in the Family; Way to Go	Carmilla; Space Janitors; Riftworld Chronicles; Yidlife Crisis; Überdude
Original Program or Series, Non-Fiction	Performance in a Program or Series Produced for Digital Media
Vice Canada Reports; Avatar Secrets; People We Love; Pop-Up Porno; Do Not Track	Michelle Nolden, Saving Hope: Psychic Healing; Darrell Faria, Chai-T; Vincent Leclerc, Coming Out; Annie Murphy, The Plateaus; Emmanuel Kabongo, Teenagers
Cross-Platform Project, Fiction	Cross-Platform Project, Non-Fiction
The Book of Negroes Interactive; Corner Gas: The Movie; Murdoch Mysteries: The Infernal Device; Schitt's Creek: Webisodes	CBC News: Missing and Murdered Indigenous Women; Dino Hunt Canada Interactive; Dive Deeper; Favela United; The Great Human Odyssey Interactive
Cross-Platform Project, Children's
Gaming Show Interactive; The Moblees App; The Next Step: Make a Scene; Oh No! It's an Alien Invasion: The Ruins Below; Zerby Derby: Read and Play

== Multiple nominations and awards ==
Films that received multiple nominations
Nominations	Show
11	Room
8	Hyena Road
7	Our Loved Ones
5	Endorphine
5	Felix and Meira
5	Forsaken
3	Brooklyn

Films that received multiple awards
Awards	Film
9	Room
3	Hyena Road
2	Brooklyn

Shows that received multiple nominations
Nominations	Show
15	Schitt's Creek
13	Orphan Black
12	19-2
12	The Book of Negroes
12	Mr. D
9	Motive
8	CBC News: The National
8	X Company
7	2015 Pan Am Games
7	the fifth estate
7	Young Drunk Punk
6	2015 IIHF World Junior Gold Medal Game
6	The Second City Project
6	This Hour Has 22 Minutes
6	Vikings
6	W5
5	The Amazing Race Canada
5	Kept Woman
5	Marketplace
5	Numb Chucks
5	Odd Squad
5	Sol
5	Strange Empire
5	Sunnyside

Shows that received multiple awards
Awards	Show
11	The Book of Negroes
9	Schitt's Creek
7	Orphan Black
6	The Amazing Race Canada
4	Degrassi
3	19-2
3	2015 FIFA Women's World Cup
3	2015 IIHF World Junior Gold Medal Game
3	Rick Mercer Report
3	Songs of Freedom

== Special awards ==
Several special awards were given:

- Board of Directors' Tribute: Ivan Fecan
- Digital Media Trailblazing Award: Ana Serrano
- Earle Grey Award: Wendy Crewson
- Fan Choice Award: Yannick Bisson
- Gordon Sinclair Award: Mark Starowicz
- Humanitarian Award: Performing Arts Lodges
- Legacy Award: Eugene Levy
- Legacy Award: Catherine O'Hara
- Lifetime Achievement Award: Martin Short
- Margaret Collier Award: Karen Walton
- Outstanding Technical Achievement Award: Router-Based Production Audio Design of Much Music Video Awards
