= Absolutely Canadian =

- Genre: Documentary
- Country of origin: Canada
- Original language: English

Original release
- Network: CBC Television
- Release: 1998

Absolutely Canadian is a Canadian documentary television series. Formerly a weekday news series on CBC Newsworld, it currently airs as a weekly series on CBC Television.

== Newsworld ==
In its CBC Newsworld era, the program aired news reports on local and regional interest stories from the CBC's local news bureaux. Premiering in 1998, it was discontinued in 2009 when Newsworld was rebranded as CBC News Network and its daytime news programming was renamed CBC News Now.

== CBC Television ==
The series was relaunched in the summer of 2011 on CBC Television as a summer documentary series, with distinct regional editions produced in British Columbia, Alberta, Manitoba, Ottawa-Gatineau, Quebec, the Maritimes and Newfoundland and Labrador. Each six-episode regional series featured a mix of news and entertainment features, including documentary reports and live performances by local musicians. Beginning in January 2012, Absolutely Canadian aired nationally as a compilation of select segments from the regional programs.

With the 2018 season the regional episodes and national curated slate of shows were made available on CBC Gem.

== Awards ==
The feature documentary Lost Years: A People's Struggle for Justice, an epic touching upon 150 years of the Chinese Canadian community and international diaspora from Absolutely Canadian's Alberta edition, produced and directed by Kenda Gee and Tom Radford, picked up two nominations for Best Sound and Best Original Music in a Non-Fiction Program at the 1st Canadian Screen Awards in 2013.

At the 3rd Canadian Screen Awards in 2015, country singer Kira Isabella garnered an award nomination for Best Performance in a Variety or Sketch Comedy Program or Series for her appearance on Studio 14 Sessions, the musical performance segment of the Ottawa edition.

At the 4th Canadian Screen Awards, the series garnered nominations in the categories of Best Music Program or Series for John Mann Here and Now, an episode of the British Columbia edition of the series featuring the first live concert performance by musician John Mann after publicizing his diagnosis with early-onset Alzheimer's disease, and Best Documentary Program for Okpik's Dream, a documentary film which aired on the Quebec edition of the series.
