= Crawford (TV series) =

Canadian television comedy series

- Created by: Mike Clattenburg; Mike O'Neill
- Starring: Jill Hennessy; John Carroll Lynch; Chad Connell; Tim Progosh; Steffi DiDomenicantonio; Megan Hutchings; Dalmar Abuzeid; Kelly McCormack; Steven McCarthy; Supinder Wraich
- Country of origin: Canada
- No. of series: 1
- No. of episodes: 12

Original release
- Network: CBC Television
- Release: February 2, 2018

Crawford is a Canadian television comedy series that aired on CBC Television in 2018. Created by Mike Clattenburg and Mike O'Neill, the series stars Jill Hennessy and John Carroll Lynch as Cynthia and Owen, the parents of a dysfunctional family. Kyle Mac stars as their middle son, Don, who comes home to make his new record after he is kicked out of his band, but discovers his ability to speak to raccoons which takes him on a new career path. Alice Moran stars as his older sister, Wendy, who's trying to find her place in the world as well; Daniel Davis Yang stars as their younger brother Brian, who has an uncanny talent at bringing the family together, despite their differences. The cast also includes Chad Connell, Tim Progosh, Steffi DiDomenicantonio, Megan Hutchings, Dalmar Abuzeid, Kelly McCormack, Steven McCarthy and Supinder Wraich.

The series is following a "hybrid" release strategy, under which the show was released in its entirety on the CBC Comedy web platform in February 2018, in advance of airing on the regular television network later that summer.

== Episodes ==
No.	Title	Directed by	Written by	Original release date
1	"I'm Not Crazy I Love You"	Mike Clattenburg	Mike Clattenburg and Mike O'Neill	February 2, 2018
2	"This Will Not Stand"	Mike Clattenburg	Mike Clattenburg and Mike O'Neill	February 2, 2018
3	"Manny's Oath of Secrecy"	Mike Clattenburg	Timm Hannebohm	February 2, 2018
4	"Someone Is Looking Out for You"	Mike Clattenburg	Mike O'Neill	February 2, 2018
5	"Rukma Vimana"	Mike Clattenburg	Mike Clattenburg	February 2, 2018
6	"Who's That Girl?"	Mike Clattenburg	Zoe Whittall	February 2, 2018
7	"Please for Fish"	Mike Clattenburg	Kathleen Phillips	February 2, 2018
8	"The Quiet One"	Mike Clattenburg	Monica Heisey	February 2, 2018
9	"I Can't Go to U2 Without You"	Mike Clattenburg	Kathleen Phillips	February 2, 2018
10	"Manny's Way"	Mike Clattenburg	Mike O'Neill	February 2, 2018
11	"He's Bending Again"	Mike Clattenburg	Zoe Whittall	February 2, 2018
12	"Can You Hear Me?"	Mike Clattenburg	Mike Clattenburg and Mike O'Neill	February 2, 2018

== Reception ==
=== Critical response ===
The show has received mixed reviews.

John Doyle of The Globe and Mail, wrote that the show is "startlingly original and it has a plain but profound theme – everybody's weird, so let's just make peace with that and see life and the world as one long, amiable comedy." Doyle had a warm reaction to the show and its co-creator, Mike Clattenburg, best known for Trailer Park Boys, saying "It is nobody's idea of a family sitcom and the better for that. Trailer Park Boys was nobody's idea of a comedy at first."

Norman Wilner of Now was more critical of the series, calling the first three episodes not remotely funny.
