= Superpower (ability) =

Superhuman ability of a fictional character

Comic book superhero Shazam has superhuman abilities derived from magic

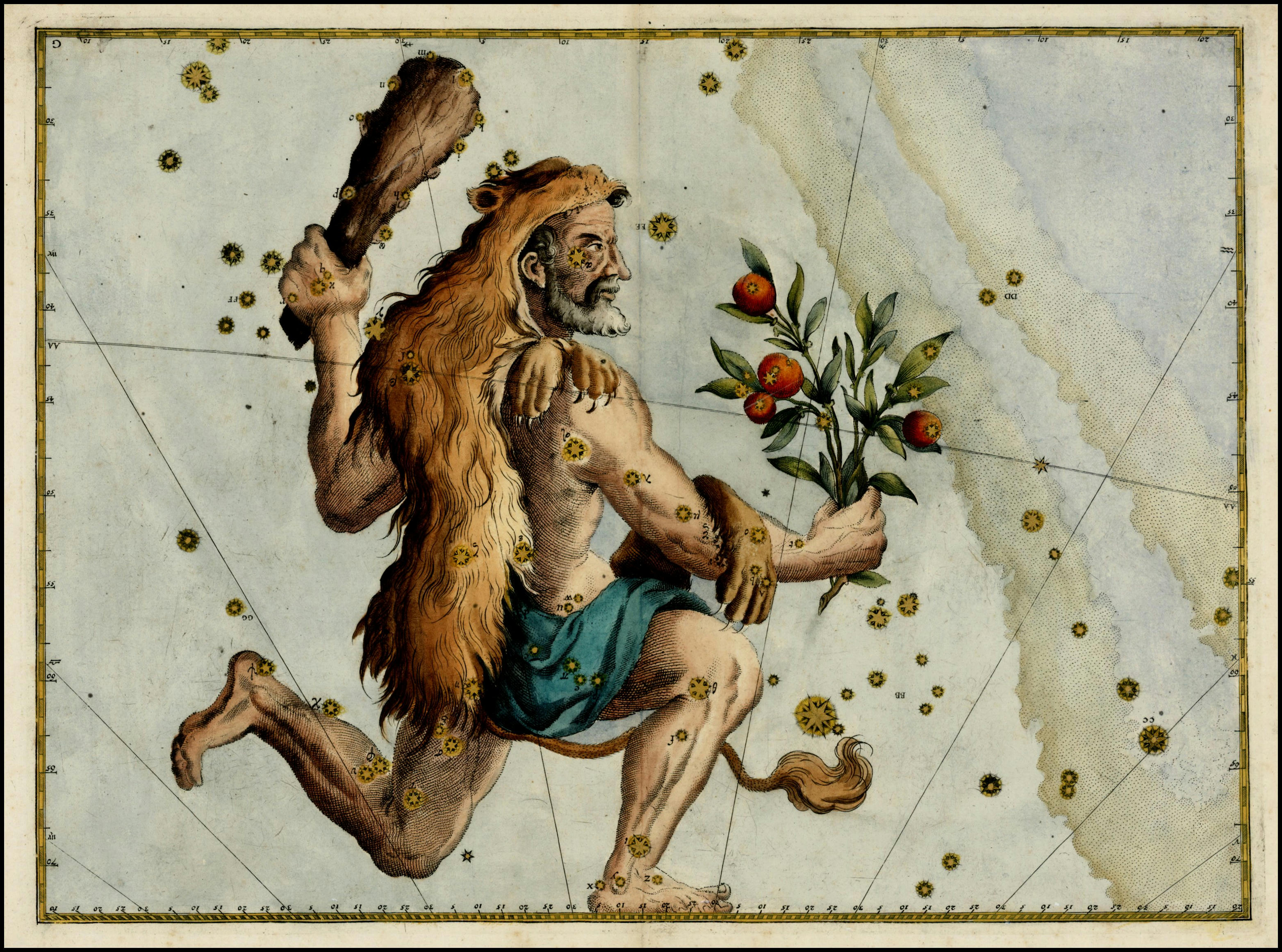
The Greek demigod Hercules had superhuman strength.

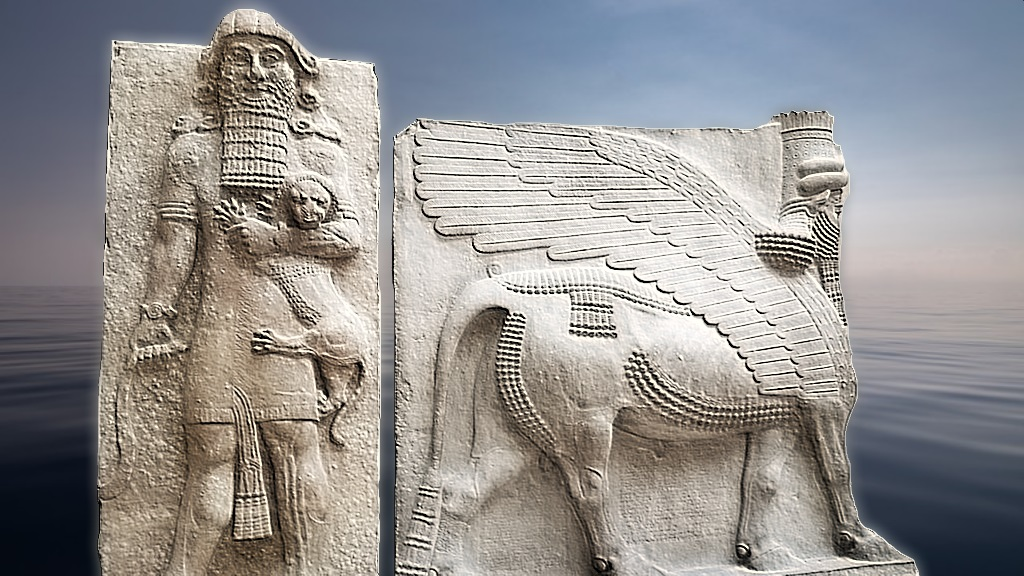
The Mesopotamian hero Gilgamesh, in the Epic of Gilgamesh, had many supernatural abilities, including "deep wisdom." In the Mesopotamian religion, positive and negative superpowers are often categorized as Magic.

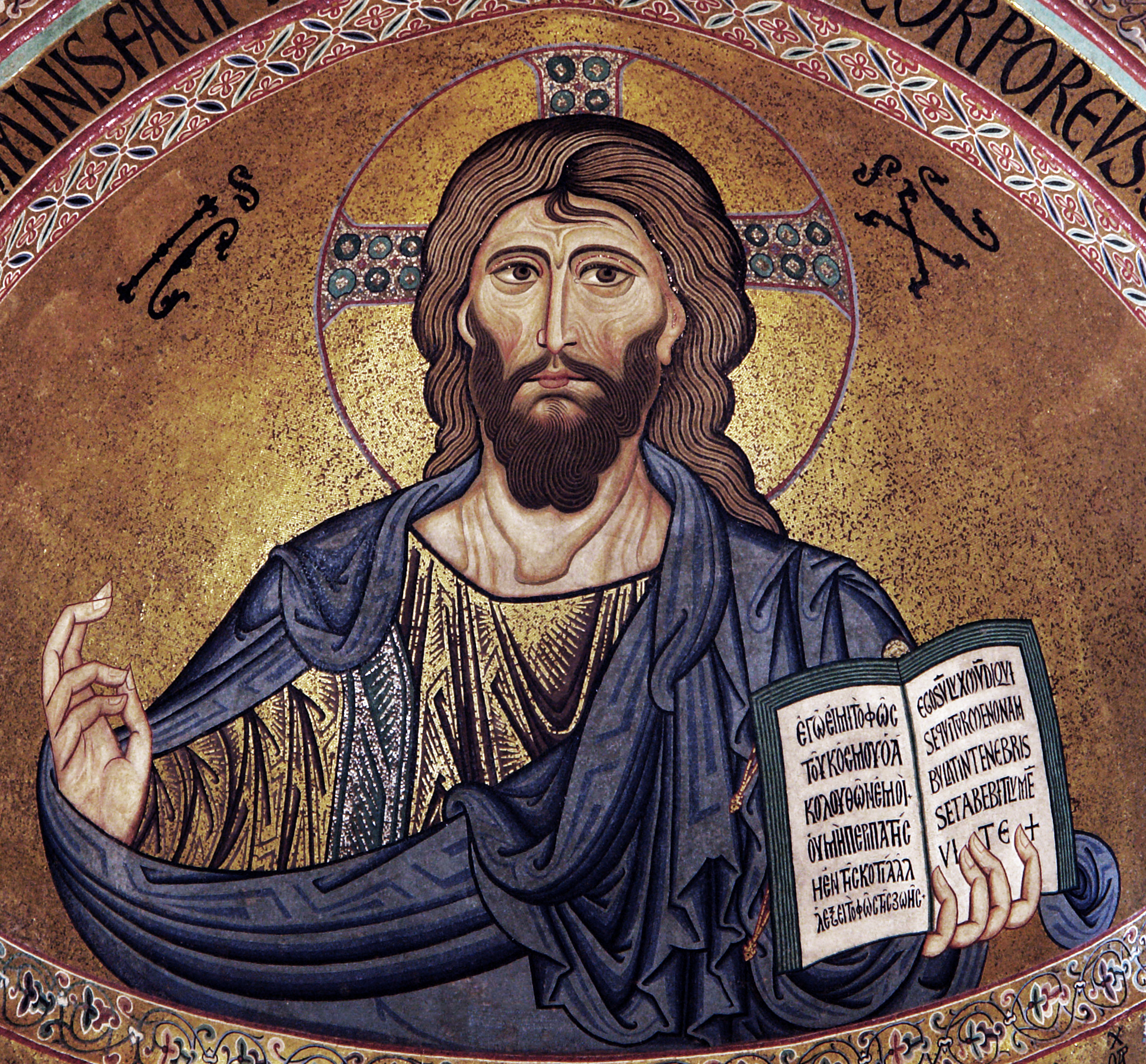
Jesus, according to the Bible, could walk on water. In Christianity, positive superpowers are known as miracles or spiritual gifts, and negative superpowers are known as magic.

A superpower or supernatural ability is a special or extraordinary attribute far greater than what is considered normal, possessed by those of superhuman status. Superpowers are typically displayed in science fiction and fantasy media such as comic books, TV shows, video games, and film as the key attribute of a superhero. The concept originated in oral tradition, long before the invention of written language, and out of these stories came mythological superheroes and demigods such as Hercules, Beowulf, Jason, and Achilles, among many others in cultures across the world. Eventually, the concept was found in a modern form in American comics and pulp fiction of the 1930s and 1940s, and has gradually worked its way into other genres and media.

== Definition ==
There is no rigid definition of a "superpower" beyond the general idea of them being a set of capabilities and traits exhibited by characters in fiction that are considered beyond the limits of normal beings or are paranormal to some degree. In popular culture, it is often associated with unusual abilities such as flight, super-strength, super-speed, invulnerability, etc. However, it can also describe natural abilities that reach the peak of human potential, such as advanced intelligence or weapon proficiency.

Characters like Batman and Iron Man may be classified as superheroes even though they're not considered as having actual superhuman abilities beyond their exceptional talent and advanced technology, yet their capabilities are still considered far superior to that of the average individual and even comparable to overtly paranormal beings with explicitly supernatural capabilities. Debates have arisen as to whether certain characters described as being "peak human" but not "superhuman", such as Captain America, do in fact have superpowers.

In fiction and fantasy, superpowers are often given scientific, technological, pseudoscientific, or supernatural explanations. They come from sources such as magic, technology, or the character's own physiological nature (being an alien, a supernatural being, or a mutant).

The widespread use of superpowers in fiction led to a trend in the 2010s of people referring to mundane things like kindness, empathy, spotting trends, or proficiency with spreadsheets as their "superpower", a usage which came to be mocked as a buzzword and corporate jargon.

== In animation ==
Superpowers are commonly used in animated television.

In shows such as Ben 10, American Dragon: Jake Long, and Danny Phantom, young protagonists are bestowed with transformative powers which lead them to live a double life. Winx Club and He-Man and the Masters of the Universe feature characters who adventure in fantastical worlds which put their inherent superpowers to the test. In Teenage Mutant Ninja Turtles, Road Rovers, and Street Sharks, the characters' superpowers are the result of being transformed into anthropomorphic animals (either from animals or humans) combined with combat training.

Other examples include: Biker Mice from Mars, Toxic Crusaders, Samurai Pizza Cats, Loonatics Unleashed, Darkwing Duck, Gargoyles, Drak Pack, Ghostforce, El Tigre: The Adventures of Manny Rivera, The Mighty B!, Three Delivery, Teamo Supremo, Mummies Alive, Super Robot Monkey Team Hyperforce Go!, The Real Adventures of Jonny Quest, Totally Spies!, Code Lyoko, Storm Hawks, Zevo-3, Chop Socky Chooks, Butt Ugly Martians, Kung Fu Dino Posse, etc.

=== In manga and anime ===
Superpowers are a commonly used concept in manga and anime — particularly in the shonen genre.

The types of powers featured vary from series to series. Some, such as Dragon Ball and Fullmetal Alchemist, feature many different characters who have the same types of powers. Others, like One Piece and Bleach, feature characters with a wide range of different powers, with many powers being unique to only one or a few characters.

Other examples include: Saint Seiya, YuYu Hakusho, Black Clover, Naruto, Code Geass, Fairy Tail, Hunter × Hunter, Attack on Titan, Bungo Stray Dogs, My Hero Academia, etc.

== In live-action TV series ==
Superpowers feature in subgenres of tokusatsu, a form of television characterised by heavy use of special effects. This is embodied by the franchise Super Sentai, known for Power Rangers, and its counterpart Kamen Rider.

In Western television, superpowers are often depicted in adaptations of comic books. Stan Lee's Superhumans was a TV series that identified persons internationally with exceptional gifts. However, series such as Heroes, Misfits and Henry Danger are original to television. They use superpowers to heighten the conflicts of otherwise ordinary characters, without strong ties to other superheroic tropes such as codenames or costumes.

== See also ==
- Hysterical strength
- Extrasensory perception
- Spiritual gift
