= Marianna Khoury =

Canadian film editor and producer

Marianna Khoury is a Canadian film and television editor and producer most noted as a four-time Canadian Screen Award winner for Best Picture Editing in a Comedy Series.

== Awards ==
Award	Date of ceremony	Category	Work	Result	Ref(s)
Canadian Screen Awards	2016	Best Live Action Short Drama (with Zack Russell)	She Stoops to Conquer	Won	
Canadian Screen Awards	2019	Best Picture Editing in a Comedy Series (with Mike Fly, Michael Pierro, Morgan Waters, Jeremy LaLonde, Stephen Withrow)	Baroness von Sketch Show	Won	
Canadian Screen Awards	2020	Best Picture Editing in a Comedy Series (with Mike Fly, Michael Pierro, Morgan Waters, Jeremy LaLonde, Stephen Withrow)	Baroness von Sketch Show	Won	
Canadian Screen Awards	2021	Best Picture Editing in a Comedy Series (with Mike Fly, Michael Pierro, Morgan Waters, Jeremy LaLonde, Stephen Withrow)	Baroness von Sketch Show	Won	
Canadian Screen Awards	2021	Best Picture Editing in a Comedy Series (with Mike Fly, Michael Pierro, Morgan Waters, Jeremy LaLonde, Stephen Withrow)	Workin' Moms	Nominated	
Canadian Screen Awards	2022	Best Picture Editing in a Comedy Series (with Mike Fly, Michael Pierro, Morgan Waters, Jeremy LaLonde, Stephen Withrow)	Workin' Moms	Nominated	
Canadian Screen Awards	2023	Best Picture Editing in a Comedy Series (with Mike Fly, Michael Pierro, Morgan Waters, Jeremy LaLonde, Stephen Withrow)	Workin' Moms	Nominated	
Canadian Screen Awards	2023	Best Picture Editing in a Comedy Series (with Mike Fly, Michael Pierro, Morgan Waters, Jeremy LaLonde, Stephen Withrow)	Sort Of	Won	
Canadian Screen Awards	2024	Best Feature Length Documentary (with Zack Russell, Matt King, Andrew Ferguson, Will Goldbloom, Tinu Sinha, Will Lomoro)	Someone Lives Here	Nominated	
Canadian Screen Awards	2024	Best Editing in a Documentary	Someone Lives Here	Nominated	
Canadian Cinema Editors	2017	Editing in a Web Series	True Dating Stories	Nominated	
Canadian Cinema Editors	2023	Editing in a Web Series	Lido TV	Nominated	
Children's and Family Emmy Awards	2022	Outstanding Editing for a Single Camera Program	Fraggle Rock: Back to the Rock	Nominated	
