= Marty Adams =

Canadian television and film actor/writer

- Born: Parry Sound, Ontario, Canada
- Education: H.B. Beal Secondary School; McMaster University; Humber College
- Occupation: Actor/Writer/Comedian

Marty Adams is a Canadian television and film actor, writer and comedian.

He attended H. B. Beal Secondary School in London, Ontario and graduated as valedictorian of his class. He began a football program at McMaster University but injured his knee. His sister encouraged him to get involved in a comedy program at Humber College which got him his first major comedy gig in Facebook of Revelations at The Second City. His last Second City main stage show was 0% Down, 100% Screwed in 2009.

He has also appeared on Video on Trial and The Second City Project, and in films including Saw IV and Scared Shitless .

== Awards ==
| Award | Year | Category | Work | Result | Ref(s) |
|---|---|---|---|---|---|
| Canadian Comedy Awards | 2009 | Best Writing in a Program or Series | The Second City's Facebook of Revelations with Bruce Pirrie, Darryl Hinds, Jim Annan, Karen Parker, Lauren Ash, Scott Montgomery, Matthew Reid | Nominated | |
| Canadian Screen Awards | 2015 | Best Supporting Actor in a Comedy Series | Spun Out | Nominated | |
| Canadian Screen Awards | 2016 | Performance in a Variety or Sketch Comedy Program or Series | The Second City Project with Kayla Lorette, Caitlin Howden, Tim Baltz, Sam Richardson, Steve Waltien | Nominated | |
