= Coming Out (web series) =

Canadian web series

Coming Out is a Canadian web series, which premiered in 2013. Created by Mathieu Blanchard, the series centred on a group of predominantly LGBT friends in Montreal.

The cast included Sébastien Beaulac, Patrick Martin, Ansia Wilscam Desjardins, Marc-André Poliquin, Rosalie Julien, Vincent Leclerc, Ariane Castellanos, Natalie Tannous, Isabelle Giroux, Carole Chatel, Olivier Loubry, Sylvie Demers, Laetitia Bélanger and Mélanie Pilon.

The series was broadcast by Sympatico over two seasons in 2013 and 2014.

Leclerc received a Canadian Screen Award nomination for Best Performance in a Program or Series Produced for Digital Media at the 4th Canadian Screen Awards in 2016.
