= 15 to Life: Kenneth's Story =

2014 Canadian-American documentary film

- Directed by: Nadine Pequeneza
- Written by: Nadine Pequeneza
- Produced by: Nadine Pequeneza
- Starring: Kenneth Young
- Cinematography: Stefan Randstrom
- Edited by: Ricardo Acosta
- Music by: Alex Khaskin
- Production company: Hitplay Productions
- Distributed by: Outcast Films; Farrago Media
- Release date: April 1, 2014 (ATLFF)
- Running time: 83 minutes
- Countries: Canada; United States
- Language: English

15 to Life: Kenneth's Story is a Canadian-American documentary film, directed by Nadine Pequeneza and released in 2014.

The film centres on 26-year-old Kenneth Young, a Florida man who has been serving four consecutive sentences of life in prison since 2001, for participating in three armed robberies and one attempted armed robbery, over a 30-day period, as a 14-year-old in the summer of 2000. The 24-year-old he was led by during the robberies received a single life sentence. The minimum guidelines in Florida for these non-lethal crimes was just under four-and-a-half years.

In 2010, the United States Supreme Court ruled in Graham v. Florida that it is unconstitutional to sentence children to life imprisonment if they had not committed murder, paraphrased throughout the film as "children are different".

The award-winning documentary focused on the injustice of keeping an adult in prison after he had become so definitively rehabilitated. Young eventually won his freedom in July 2021.https://law.fsu.edu/sites/g/files/upcbnu1581/files/Academics/Clinical%20Programs/mailing-65ur9d-35f6f731ba072b94f17a82fa3ce71167.pdf

== Kenneth's re-sentencing journey ==
Young's lawyers go to the 13th Judicial Circuit Court Of Florida, in Tampa, for his required re-sentencing hearing, to advocate for his full release from prison. The effort to have him released failed, though the judge did obey the Graham ruling by replacing the four unlawful consecutive life sentences with four concurrent sentences of 30 years.

Young and his lawyers next go to Florida's Second District Court of Appeal, hoping to have the court find that the Circuit Court erred by not releasing him for time served – then 12 years and counting. Their argument is further supported by the related decision in Miller v. Alabama (2012), in which the US Supreme Court ruled that mandatory sentences of life without parole for juvenile offenders, even in cases of murder, is unconstitutional, reinforcing the concept that "children are different". In February 2013, Young's appeal is denied.

In 2014, Florida mandated reviews for juvenile offenders serving long prison terms, which resulted in a decision that Young would be released after 21 years in prison, rather than 30.

In 2023, Young was arrested in Florida and charged with numerous drug trafficking offenses as well as violating the terms of his parole.

== Film's release and reception ==
The film premiered in April 2014 at the Atlanta Film Festival. It was broadcast by PBS as an episode of the documentary series POV in August 2014, and was broadcast in Canada by ichannel in 2015.

The film was a nominee for the Donald Brittain Award at the 4th Canadian Screen Awards in 2016, and Pequeneza was nominated for Best Direction in a Documentary Program and Best Writing in a Documentary Program. Pequeneza won the writing award.
