= Makivvik =

Legal representative of Quebec's Inuit

Makivvik (Inuktitut: ᒪᑭᕝᕕᒃ, Makivvik; French: Makivvik) (formerly Makivik Corporation) is the legal representative of Quebec's Inuit, established in 1978 under the terms of the James Bay and Northern Quebec Agreement, the agreement that established the institutions of Nunavik. As such, it is the heir of the Northern Quebec Inuit Association (Inuktitut: ᑯᐸᐃᒃ ᑕᕐᕋᖓᓂ ᐃᓄᐃᑦ ᑲᑐᔾᔨᖃᑎᒌᖏᑦ, Kupaik Tarrangani Inuit Katujjiqatigiingit), which signed the agreement with the governments of Quebec and of Canada.

== Overview ==
Makivvik's principal responsibility is the administration of Inuit lands and the over CA$120 million in compensation funds it has received under the terms of the James Bay and Northern Quebec Agreement of 1975 and the more recent offshore Nunavik Inuit Land Claims Agreement that came into effect in 2008. It has a mandate to use those funds to promote the economic and social development of Inuit society in Nunavik. Makivvik is also empowered to negotiate new agreements with governments on behalf of the Quebec Inuit and to represent them on bodies like the Inuit Tapiriit Kanatami and the Inuit Circumpolar Council.

The corporation is run by a five-member executive committee including a president and a 16-member board of directors. Members of both bodies are elected by the Inuit of Nunavik. The executive committee and board of directors together appoint a board of governors to act as an elders' council. Makivvik's president is Pita Aatami. It is headquartered in Kuujjuaq and it has offices in Inukjuak, Montreal, Quebec City. It has roughly 100 employees.

Makivvik has donated some CA$60 million to non-profit and cultural institutions in Nunavik, including funding the construction of recreation facilities in each of Nunavik's communities. However, the bulk of its financial activities have been in the form of investments, both in Canadian and international markets, and in economic activities directly relevant to Nunavik.

Makivvik has a number of wholly owned subsidiaries and joint ventures active in Nunavik.

The Northern Quebec Inuit Association is an active member of the University of the Arctic. UArctic is an international cooperative network based in the Circumpolar Arctic region, consisting of more than 200 universities, colleges, and other organizations with an interest in promoting education and research in the Arctic region.

Makivvik is responsible for the annual long-distance sled dog race Ivakkak, launched in 2001 to promote traditional dogsledding and to revive the Canadian Inuit Dog.

== Subsidiaries ==
- Air Inuit – a regional airline serving Nunavik
- Canadian North – a Canadian domestic airline serving the Arctic
- Nunavik Geomatics – a consulting company specializing in the geomatics industry
- Halutik Enterprises – a fuel and heavy equipment firm operating out of Kuujjuaq

== Joint ventures ==
Makivvik's joint ventures are primarily firms co-owned with other Inuit development funds.

- Pan Arctic Inuit Logistics – PAIL operates and services military and air traffic radars in Arctic Canada.
- Unaaq Fisheries – a shrimp trawling firm. Unaaq is the Inuktitut word for harpoon
- Nunavut Eastern Arctic Shipping – a sea shipping firm servicing Arctic Canada
- Natsiq Investment Corporation – an investment fund to harvest seals and to develop international markets for seal products. Natsiq is the Inuktitut word for seal

== See also ==
- Alaska Native Corporation, created from a land claims settlement
- Inuvialuit Settlement Region, an Inuit area in the Northwest Territories
- Nunatsiavut, an autonomous Inuit Land Claims Area in Newfoundland and Labrador
