= Ivakkak =

Annual dog sled race held in Canada

The Ivakkak is an annual long-distance sled dog race that follows a variable route through different communities in Nunavik, Canada. Launched in 2001 to promote traditional dogsledding and to revive the endangered Canadian Inuit Dog, only Inuit mushers are eligible.

== The dog in the way of life for Inuit ==
Powerfully built with thick fur enabling them to endure harsh, freezing temperatures, Canadian Inuit Dogs are capable of carrying heavy loads as they travel great distances across the vast expanse of tundra. Whether pulling a sled or running alongside their owners, these dogs enabled the Inuit to cover great distances in search of game to feed their families, and to transport heavy loads. While snowmobiles are known for their "speed and capacity" in comparison to a dog sled, a strong team of sled dogs is still considered reliable, as well as invaluable as guides. Also considered culturally significant, these dogs often find their way even in whiteout conditions.

== History ==
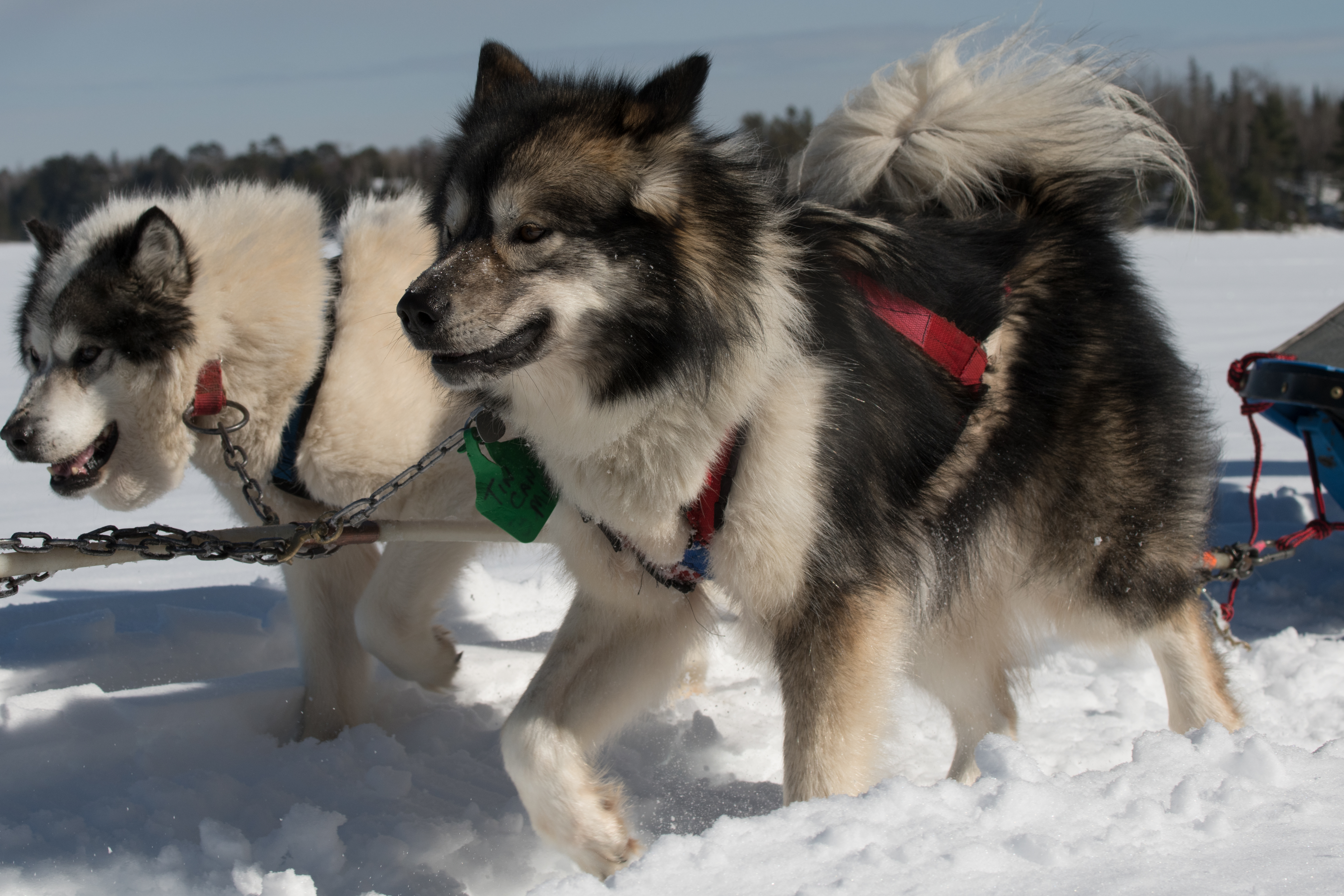
Canadian Inuit Dogs

Between 1950 and 1970, the Royal Canadian Mounted Police (RCMP) slaughtered an estimated 1,200 to 20,000 Inuit sled dogs, an event that severely disrupted the Inuit way of life.

With the aim of bringing dogs back to Nunavik after the RCMP killings, the Inuit-representing corporation Makivvik launched Ivakkak in 2001. Named by Johnny Watt, the Nunavik Governor at the time and an experienced musher who delivered measles vaccines by dogsled in the 1950s, Ivakkak is Inuit for "when the dogs are at their best pace." The first Ivakkak started in Umiujaq and followed along the coast of the Hudson Bay, passing through Inukjuak before ending in Puvirnituq. 82 mushers competed in the first year, racing 275 miles (443 km).

== Structure and route ==
Only Nunavik Inuit beneficiaries of the James Bay and Northern Quebec Agreement are allowed to register as participants, and only purebred Inuit Husky dogs are eligible to participate in Ivakkak. The route and distance change every year. In 2016, the route took mushers approximately 650 kilometres (400 mi) from Umiujaq to Ivujivik. In 2022, the race was cancelled due to COVID-19 pandemic, with some communities holding a much smaller 64-kilometre (40 mi) race without Makivvik involvement. Due to poor snow conditions, the 2024 race route was modified to go from Umiujaq to Puvirnituq, with a stop in Inukjuak. The new route covers a total of approximately 410 kilometres (250 mi), compared to the previous route's 385 kilometres (239 mi). In 2025, the route was 328 kilometres (204 mi), starting in Kangiqsualujjuaq and finishing in Tasiujaq.

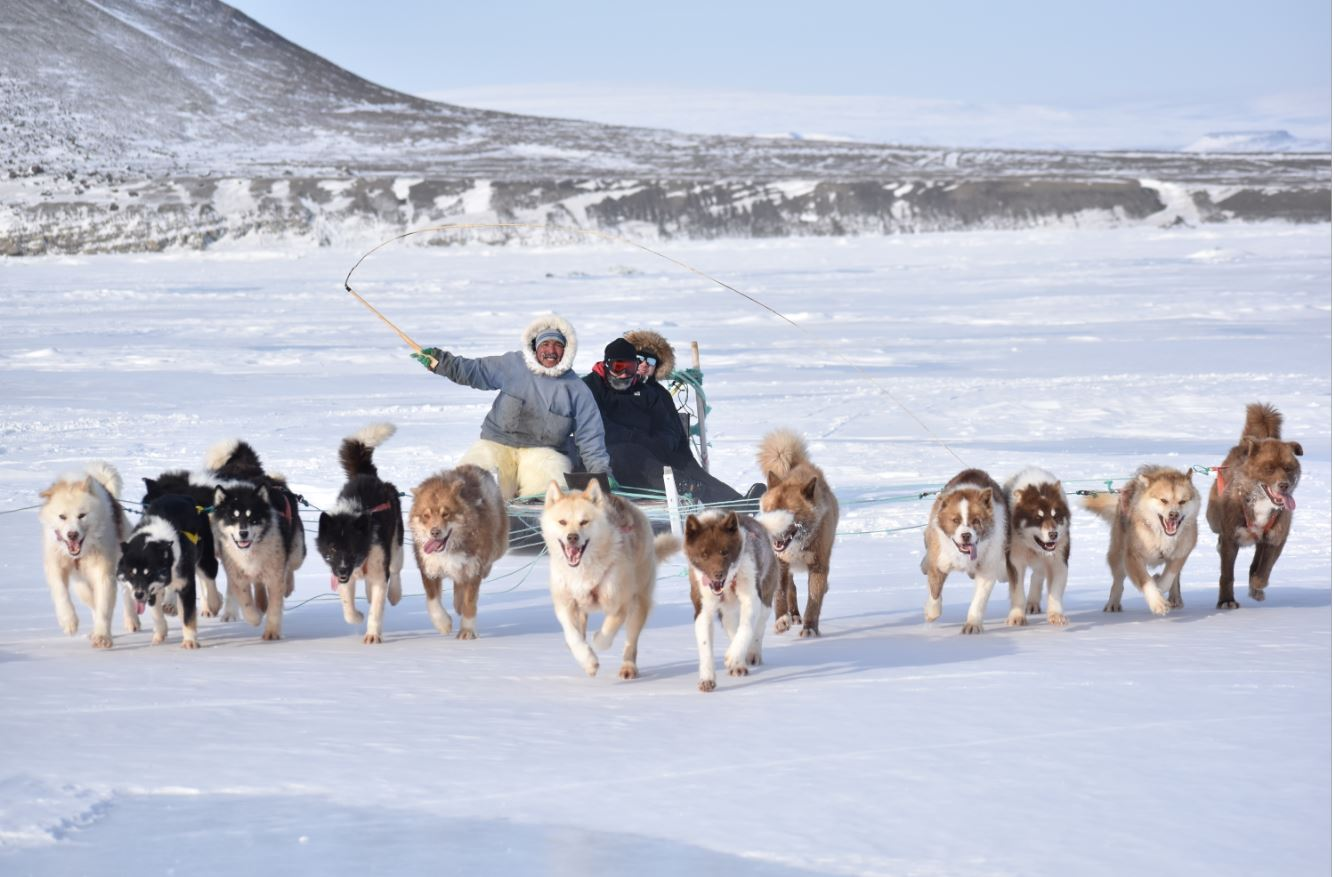
Inuit mushers using a fan hitch and a qamutiik

Unlike other sled dog races like the Iditarod, where sled dogs race along trails, Ivakkak mushers participate in pairs use a wider sled known as a qamutiik to cross the tundra. Dogs are hooked to the sled using a traditional fan hitch, a design where each dog has its own line. Due to the extreme cold of the region, with temperatures hovering around −40 °C (−40 °F), mushers often run beside their sled to warm up. Some mushers can lose up to 9 kilograms (20 lb) of body weight during the race. Blizzard conditions are common during the race and teams must navigate through high winds and caribou migrations.

== In popular culture ==
The 2015 Canadian documentary film, Okpik's Dream chronicles the story of Harry Okpik, an Inuk man from Quaqtaq, who witnessed the government slaughter of Inuit sled dogs as a child and later lost his leg in a hunting accident, and now prepares to compete in the Ivakkak sled dog race.

== See also ==
- List of sled dog races
- Dog sled
- Sled dog
