= Snapshots (TV series) =

- Presented by: Dalmar Abuzeid
- Country of origin: Canada

Production
- Running time: 30 minutes

Original release
- Network: CBC Television
- Release: September 10 – October 15, 2016

Snapshots is a Canadian reality television series for children, which premiered on CBC Television in September 10, 2016 and ran for 6 episodes. Hosted by Dalmar Abuzeid, the series features kids learning photography skills through a competition to produce the best photograph in different areas of photography. The series also features an online component, in which home viewers can submit their own photographs, based on challenges depicted within the show, for judging as a separate contest. It continued to run on CBC on Saturdays during its CBC Kids block. It is unknown if Snapshots will be renewed for a second season.

== Episodes ==
- Making A Splash
- We Can Be Comic Book Heroes
- Flashing Lights
- Catch Me In Action
- The World Up Close
- Shoot & Score
