= Nadine Pequeneza =

Canadian documentary film director

Nadine Pequeneza is a Canadian documentary film director and producer. She is most noted for her 2014 film 15 to Life: Kenneth's Story, for which she won the Canadian Screen Award for Best Writing in a Documentary Program, and was nominated for Best Direction in a Documentary Program, at the 4th Canadian Screen Awards in 2016.

She was also a Gemini Award nominee for Best Direction in a Documentary Program at the 26th Gemini Awards in 2011 for Inside Disaster Haiti, and a Canadian Screen Award nominee for Best Writing in a Documentary Program at the 8th Canadian Screen Awards in 2020 for The Invisible Heart.

Her most recent film, Last of the Right Whales, was released in 2021, and received limited theatrical release before being broadcast on television as an episode of The Nature of Things in 2023. She received two Canadian Screen Award nominations, for Best Direction in a Documentary Program and Best Writing in a Documentary Program, at the 12th Canadian Screen Awards in 2024.

Her other credits as a producer have included An Unfinished Journey.
