= Khaleel Seivwright =

Canadian carpenter

Khaleel Seivwright is a Canadian carpenter and homelessness activist known for his construction of homeless shelters.

== Early life ==
Sievwright grew up in suburban Toronto; his parents are Jamaican immigrants. After high school, he took a job as an apprentice carpenter, and learned how to frame houses. In his early 20s, he lived on a British Columbia commune where he built his own tiny home shelter.

== Toronto homeless shelters ==
In September 2020, Sievwright began building homeless shelters and placing them in parks and ravines in Toronto. The small shelters cost about $1,000 CAD to build. The shelters included insulation, a Vapor barrier, a carbon monoxide detector and a lock.

In November 2020, the City of Toronto wrote to Sievwright, demanding that he "immediately cease the production, distribution, supply and installation" of the shelters. A petition started by Sievwright in response to the City's letter garnered over 80,000 signatures.

In January 2021, Sievwright launched a crowdfunding campaign that raised over $200,000 CAD to construct more of the shelters.

In February 2021, the City filed an injunction to stop the construction of the shelters, which take the form of very small tiny homes. Critics of Seivwright's shelters, including the City of Toronto, have said that the homes do not represent a long-term solution to homelessness.

As of April 2021, Sievwright had built over 100 of the shelters, with a crew of 40 volunteers.

Sievwright was the subject of the 2023 documentary Someone Lives Here. The film won Best Canadian Documentary at the Vancouver International Film Festival.
