= Okpik's Dream =

- Directed by: Laura Rietveld
- Written by: Laura Rietveld
- Produced by: Katarina Soukup
- Starring: Harry Okpik
- Cinematography: Alexandre Domingue; Alex Margineanu; Stefan Nitoslawski
- Edited by: Heidi Haines
- Music by: Ramachandra Borcar
- Production company: Catbird Films
- Distributed by: CBC Television
- Release date: August 29, 2015
- Running time: 73 minutes
- Country: Canada
- Languages: English; Inuktitut

Okpik's Dream is a Canadian documentary film, released in 2015. The film centres on Harry Okpik, an Inuk man from Quaqtaq, who witnessed a government slaughter of Inuit sled dogs as a child and later lost his leg in a hunting accident, and now prepares to compete as a dog musher in the 600 km Ivakkak sled dog race in Nunavik.

The film had select film festival screenings, but was distributed primarily as a CBC Television special which aired in August 2015 as an episode of the regional documentary series Absolutely Canadian.

The film won a Community Award from the 2015 First Peoples' Festival in Montreal, and was a nominee for Best Documentary Program at the 4th Canadian Screen Awards.

== See also ==
- Qimmit, a Clash of Two Truths, a 2010 documentary about the alleged mass slaughter of Inuit sled dogs
