= Songs of Freedom (TV series) =

- Genre: documentary
- Directed by: Barbara Willis Sweete
- Starring: Measha Brueggergosman
- Country of origin: Canada
- No. of seasons: 1
- No. of episodes: 5

Production
- Producer: Barbara Willis Sweet
- Production company: Rhombus Media

Original release
- Network: Vision TV
- Release: February 2 – February 27, 2015

Songs of Freedom is a Canadian performing arts documentary series, which aired on Vision TV in 2015. Starring opera singer Measha Brueggergosman and produced to celebrate Black History Month, the series consisted of a 90-minute live concert special of Brueggergosman performing a program of African-American spiritual songs, followed by a four-part documentary series about Brueggergosman exploring her African heritage. The series' title takes its name from the lyrics of Bob Marley's single, "Redemption Song".

The series garnered four Canadian Screen Award nominations at the 4th Canadian Screen Awards in 2016. It won three awards, including Direction in a Documentary Program (Barbara Willis Sweete), Editing in a Documentary Program (David New) and Sound in a Non-Fiction Program (Peter Sawade, David Rose, L. Stu Young, Lou Solakofski, Martin Gwynn Jones, Krystin Hunter and Jane Tattersall).
