= The Second City Project =

- Genre: Sketch comedy
- Created by: Bob Martin
- Starring: Kayla Lorette; Marty Adams; Caitlin Howden; Tim Baltz; Sam Richardson; Steve Waltien
- Composer: Jay McCarrol
- Country of origin: Canada
- Original language: English

Production
- Running time: 30 minutes

Original release
- Network: Global
- Release: April 19, 2015 – 2015

The Second City Project is a Canadian television and web comedy series, which premiered in 2015. Created by The Second City, the series consisted of a number of shortform comedy videos which aired on the Global Television Network's online streaming platform, culminating in a half-hour television special which aired on the regular broadcast network in April 2015.

The cast consisted of Kayla Lorette, Marty Adams, Caitlin Howden, Tim Baltz, Sam Richardson and Steve Waltien, and the series was produced by Bob Martin.

The program garnered several Canadian Screen Award nominations at the 4th Canadian Screen Awards in 2016, including Best Variety or Sketch Comedy Program or Series, and an ensemble nomination for the cast in Best Performance in a Variety or Sketch Comedy Program or Series.
