= CBC Presents the Stratford Festival =

Canadian film and television series

CBC Presents the Stratford Festival is a Canadian film and television series. Produced by the Stratford Festival in conjunction with CBC Television, the series aims to film a Stratford production of every William Shakespeare play by 2025. In addition to airing on CBC Television, the films will also be distributed theatrically both in and outside of Canada.

The project received a $3 million grant from the Federal Economic Development Agency for Southern Ontario in July 2015.

== Films ==
=== King Lear ===
The first film in the series, King Lear, starred Colm Feore in the title role. The cast also included Scott Wentworth as Gloucester, Maev Beaty as Goneril, Sara Farb as Cordelia and Stephen Ouimette as The Fool. The production was directed by Antoni Cimolino.

Feore garnered a Canadian Screen Award nomination as best actor in a television film or miniseries at the 4th Canadian Screen Awards in 2016.

=== King John ===
The production of King John stars Tom McCamus as King John, Graham Abbey as King Philip and Seana McKenna as Lady Constance, and was directed by Tim Carroll.

McCamus and McKenna both garnered Canadian Screen Award nominations, McCamus as best actor in a television film or miniseries and McKenna as best actress in a television film or miniseries, at the 4th Canadian Screen Awards.

=== Antony and Cleopatra ===
The production of Antony and Cleopatra aired in 2015, starring Geraint Wyn Davies and Yanna McIntosh in the title roles, and was directed by Gary Griffin.

Davies and McIntosh both garnered Canadian Screen Award nominations, Davies as best actor in a television film or miniseries and McIntosh as best actress in a television film or miniseries, at the 4th Canadian Screen Awards.

=== Hamlet ===
Hamlet, aired in 2016, starred Jonathan Goad as Hamlet, Tom Rooney as Polonius, Seana McKenna as Gertrude, and Geraint Wyn Davies as Claudius.

=== The Adventures of Pericles ===
The Adventures of Pericles, aired in 2016, starred Evan Buliung as Pericles, Wayne Best as Antiochus, and Deborah Hay as Thaisa and Marina.

=== The Taming of the Shrew ===
The Taming of the Shrew, aired in 2016, starred Ben Carlson as Petruchio and Deborah Hay as Katharina.
