= Dalmar Abuzeid =

Canadian actor (b. 1990)

- Born: Dalmar Abuzeid; October 23, 1990 (age 36); Toronto, Ontario, Canada
- Years active: 2003–present

Dalmar Abuzeid (born October 23, 1990) is a Canadian actor. He initially became known for portraying Danny Van Zandt in Degrassi: The Next Generation from 2004 until 2010. Since Degrassi, he has appeared in a variety of television series such as Murdoch Mysteries (2014), Hemlock Grove (2015), Shoot the Messenger (2016), Crawford (2018), and The Comey Rule (2020).

In 2019, Abuzeid earned acclaim for his performance in the Netflix series Anne with an E, winning an ACTRA Award and a Canadian Screen Award. With this role, Abuzeid became the first Black actor to perform in the history of the Anne of Green Gables media franchise.

== Career ==
=== Acting ===
Abuzeid rose to prominence for portraying the character Danny Van Zandt on the popular Canadian television series Degrassi: The Next Generation. During this time, he also played a main role on the Teletoon series Majority Rules!. Following Degrassi, Abuzeid went on to appear in a variety of television series such as Murdoch Mysteries (2014), Hemlock Grove (2015), Shoot the Messenger (2016), Crawford (2018), and The Comey Rule (2020). In addition to acting, he has also been a host of TVOKids, and the Kids CBC series Snapshots.

From 2018 to 2019, Abuzeid portrayed Sebastian 'Bash' Lacroix in the second and third seasons of Anne with an E; this marked the first time that a Black character has been featured since the franchise's inception. He won the Canadian Screen Award for Best Guest Performance in a Drama Series at the 8th Canadian Screen Awards in 2020. He also won an ACTRA Award for his performance in Anne with an E.

=== Music ===
Abuzeid played bass in the band SoundSpeed, a six-piece music group that also included his friend Sean Farquharson and four other Degrassi cast members Raymond Ablack (lead vocalist), Jamie Johnston (guitarist), Shane Kippel (drums), and Scott Paterson (keytar). They released a three-song EP in January 2010.

== Filmography ==
=== Film ===
Year	Title	Role	Notes
2014	Pompeii	Felix	
2015	Mannish Boy	Bobby Mayhill	Short film
2017	Ashes	Bobby	
2017	Rive	Marcus	Short film
2019	Goalie	Clerk	
2019	Solitude By Black Sabbath	Sean	Short film
2020	Hypernova	Ben Frederick	Short film
2020	Trouble	Dante	Short film
2020	Beacons of Gondor	Ranger 3	Short film
2020	Come Play	Mr. Calarco	
2022	Luckiest Girl Alive	Aaron Wickersham	

=== Television ===
Year	Title	Role	Notes
2004–2010	Degrassi: The Next Generation	Danny Van Zandt	91 episodes
2006–2009	Degrassi: Minis	Danny Van Zandt	TV series shorts
2009	Degrassi Goes Hollywood	Danny Van Zandt	TV movie
2009–2011	Majority Rules!	Jarmin	24 episodes
2010	Degrassi Takes Manhattan	Danny Van Zandt	TV movie
2014	Murdoch Mysteries	Jeremy Hardy	Episode: "Murdoch in Ragtime"
2014	Republic of Doyle	Craig Kelly	Episode: "The Driver"
2015	Hemlock Grove	Suresh	Episode: "Souls on Ice"
2016	Dark Matter	Kandrik	Episode: "Wish I'd Spaced You When I Had the Chance"
2016	Shoot the Messenger	Khaalif Suleman	5 episodes
2018	Crawford	Devon	7 episodes
2018	Condor	Caleb Wolfe	4 episodes
2018–2019	Anne with an E	Sebastian 'Bash' Lacroix	18 episodes
2019	Pure	Winston Lee	6 episodes
2020	The Comey Rule	Justin Patel	2 episodes
2021	Faith Heist	Jorday May	Television film
2022	In the Dark	Navarro	4 episodes
2026	Phoebe & Jay	Sid	Episode: "Flipping Out/Jay's Cut"

=== Video games ===
Year	Title	Role	Language
2023	Reverse: 1999	Click	English
