= She Stoops to Conquer (2015 film) =

- Directed by: Zack Russell
- Written by: Kayla Lorette; Zachary Russell
- Produced by: Marianna Khoury; Ann Merriam; Hanna Puley; Zachary Russell; Eva Saphir
- Starring: Kayla Lorette; Julian Richings; Bruce Dow
- Cinematography: Henry Sansom
- Edited by: Marianna Khoury
- Music by: Dan Werb
- Distributed by: LaRue Entertainment
- Release date: September 13, 2015 (TIFF)
- Running time: 15 minutes
- Country: Canada
- Language: English

She Stoops to Conquer is a 2015 Canadian short film directed by Zack Russell. It stars Kayla Lorette and Julian Richings, and had its world premiere at the 2015 Toronto International Film Festival.

The film follows "a struggling talent-show performer who wanders into a nightclub disguised in a mask, and is inexplicably attracted to the real-life doppelgänger of her masked character." Lorette wore a prosthetic mask of Richings' face for the film.

The film has played numerous festivals worldwide, including the Vancouver International Film Festival, the Raindance Film Festival, and the New Orleans Film Festival.

The film has garnered critical praise and won the Canadian Screen Award for Best Live Action Short Drama at the 4th Canadian Screen Awards.
