= Forget and Forgive (film) =

- Film poster
- Written by: Doug Barber, James Phillips
- Directed by: Tristan Dubois
- Starring: Elisabeth Röhm; Tygh Runyan; Neil Napier; Vivien Endicott-Douglas; Mal Dassin; Katy Grabstas; Richard Clarkin; Frank Moore; Julian Casey
- Music by: James Gelfand, Louise Tremblay
- Country of origin: Canada
- Original language: English

Production
- Producers: Jean Bureau, Ian Whitehead
- Cinematography: Daniel Villeneuve
- Editor: Benjamin Duffield
- Running time: 87 minutes
- Production company: Incendo Productions

Original release
- Release: 28 December 2014

Forget and Forgive (French: L'énigme; UK: Left for Dead; France: Oublier et pardonner) is a 2014 Canadian suspense-thriller television film directed by Tristan Dubois and starring Elisabeth Röhm as a policewoman who, after a brutal interrogation, is left for dead, but survives with no memory of her life or her family. The film features an original score by James Gelfand and Louise Tremblay.

== Plot ==
Left for dead after a brutal interrogation apparently gone wrong, vice detective Anna Walker (Elisabeth Röhm) awakes in the hospital with no memory of who she is. She recognizes no-one; not her husband Tate (Neil Napier), her daughter Emily (Vivien Endicott-Douglas), nor Derek (Tygh Runyan), her partner on the police force, who tells her most of the rest of the force is occupied with solving the recent murder of the mayor, her own assault being less of a priority. On her return home Anna discovers that hers is not a happy family: her relationship with Emily was extremely strained; Anna herself was on the verge of leaving Tate. She has other problems brewing: whoever assaulted her may want to finish the job, if her memory returns. A visit from Internal Affairs suggests some on the force may think she is faking her amnesia and has something to hide.

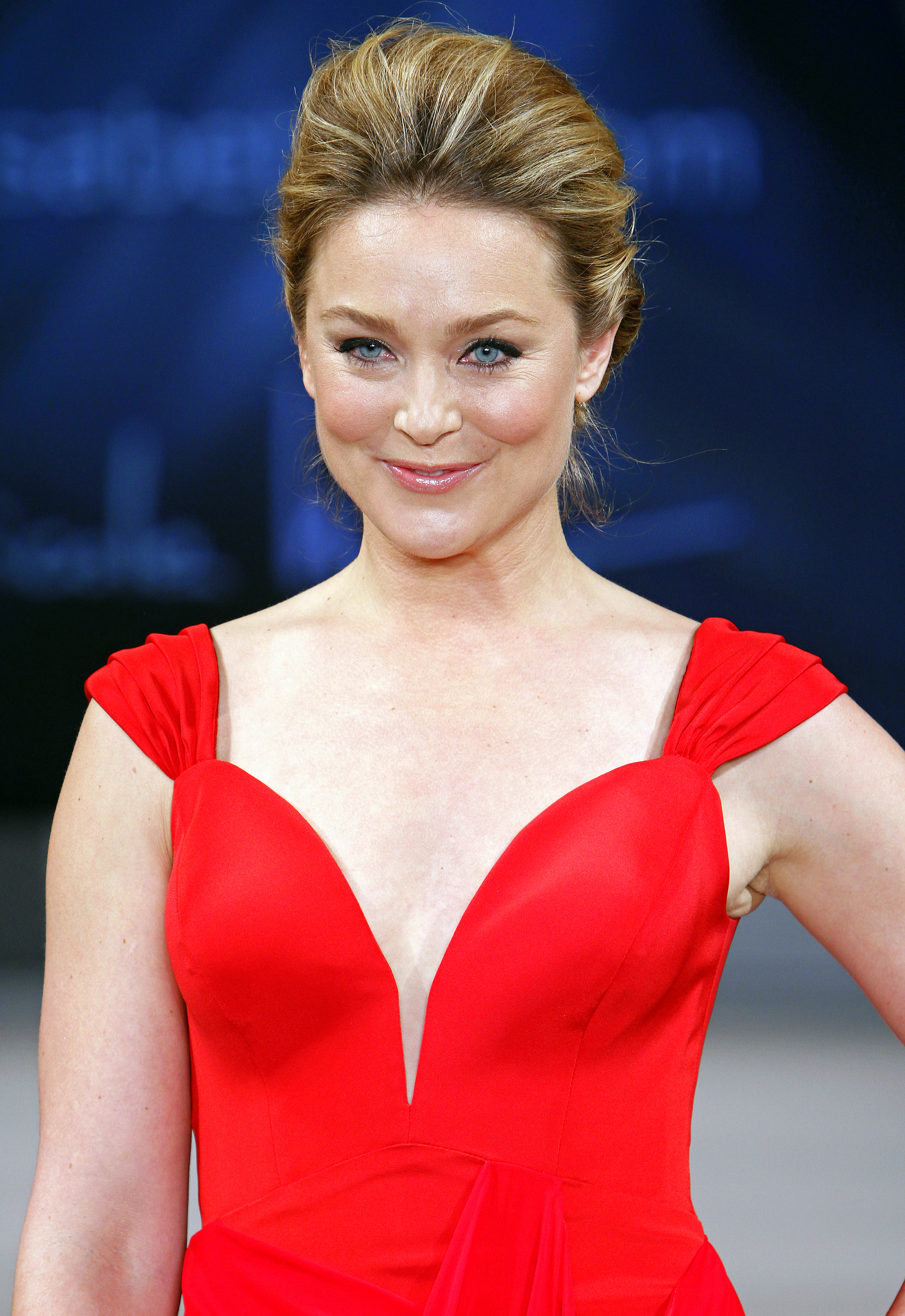
Elisabeth Röhm in 2012

Not knowing whom to trust, she must find out who may still be pursuing her, before they eliminate her once and for all. Anna begins an investigation of her own immediate past and discovers she was callous and competitive enough to put her job above her family and was having an affair with Derek, who helps her with her investigation. The more she learns, the more she wants to put right whatever went wrong in her life. She and Derek were on the take. Her investigations lead to realize she had found a safe house for a witness to the mayor's murder, a young prostitute. Eventually, she works out that the only safe place for her was her father's house, and, going there, she unwittingly leads the killer's gang to the safe house, as Derek betrays her. She has no choice but to return with him and the young woman, as the gang leader has her husband and daughter hostage...

== Cast ==
- Elisabeth Röhm
- Tygh Runyan
- Neil Napier
- Vivien Endicott-Douglas
- Mal Dassin
- Katy Grabstas
- Richard Clarkin
- Frank Moore
- Julian Casey
- Claudia Besso
- Raphael Grosz-Harvey
- Olivier Surprenant
- Ziad Ghanem
- Isabelle Giroux

== Production ==
Production studio Incendo has produced several female-led thriller films. Forget and Forgive was produced with the participation of Bell Media. Principal photography began on 14 April 2014 in Montréal.

James Gelfand co-scored the film with his wife, pianist Louise Tremblay, while also working on two other projects over a number of months: Christmas film Northpole and The Prodigal Son, a "biblical musical".

== Release ==
=== Broadcasts ===
In Canada, Forget and Forgive aired for the first time on 28 December 2014, on CTV Television Network. In the United States, it aired on the Lifetime Movie Network on 29 and 30 May 2015. It remains in the regular rotation on Lifetime.

=== Home media and streaming ===
A DVD was released in 2015. Forget and Forgive was available on Netflix until March 2018, and is available from myLifetime.com and Amazon Prime.

=== French version ===
The film is available dubbed in French, in an adaptation by Pascale Lortie and Michel Gatignol.

== Reception ==
=== Critical response ===
Virginia DeBolt found the story interesting, but was put off by the "over-the-top handling of some of the emotional scenes". Jim McLennan finds Röhm "okay", and is impressed by the opening sequence which is "surprisingly brutal, given the medium and origins", but the script does not manage "to live up to the toughness with which it begins."

In other hands, the general scenario might have made for an interesting study: how a sudden, externally triggered change in someone’s character affects them and those around them. However, the film instead chooses to wander off in a number of far less successful directions.

Andy Webb, who points out that Elisabeth Röhm previously played a woman with amnesia in the 2009 TV film Desperate Escape, finds the story is "never gripping enough" despite its "decent idea"; unfortunately, "the execution of it fails to do it justice" and "lengthy build up" feels "a bit drawn out." On a German TV film review site, Röhm is described as unenthusiastic in her role, which the site ascribes to a predictable script; as well, the direction and photography appear amateurish. The Radio Times assigned the film 2 out of 5 stars.

=== Nominations ===
- 2016 Canadian Screen Awards
  - Best TV Movie or Limited Series
  - Best Direction in a Dramatic Program or Limited Series
  - Best Writing in a Dramatic Program or Limited Series
- Directors Guild of Canada (2015)
  - Direction - Television Movie/Mini-Series (DGC Craft Award)
- Sichuan Television Festival (2015)
  - Best Performance by an Actress in a Mini-Series or Motion Picture Made for Television
