= Bad Coyote =

2013 film by Jason Andrew Young

- Directed by: Jason Andrew Young
- Written by: Jason Andrew Young
- Produced by: Paul McNeill
- Starring: Emily Mitchell; Pierre Rompre
- Cinematography: John Walker
- Edited by: Andrew MacCormack
- Music by: Dave Anderson
- Production company: National Film Board of Canada
- Release date: September 2013 (AIFF)
- Running time: 52 minutes
- Country: Canada
- Language: English

Bad Coyote is a 2013 Canadian documentary film, directed by Jason Andrew Young.

== Summary ==
The film profiles the expansion of the Eastern coyote into Atlantic Canada, centred in particular on the 2009 death of singer-songwriter Taylor Mitchell in a coyote attack.

== Release ==
The film premiered at the 2013 Atlantic International Film Festival, and received some further film festival and commercial screenings, including at the Planet in Focus environmental film festival, before receiving a television broadcast on Documentary in 2014.

== Accolades ==
The film was nominated for Best Science or Nature Documentary, and Young was nominated for Best Direction in a Documentary Program, at the 4th Canadian Screen Awards in 2015.
