= Qimmit, a Clash of Two Truths =

Qimmit: A Clash of Two Truths
- Directed by: Joelie Sanguya, Ole Gjerstad
- Production companies: Piksuk Media, National Film Board of Canada
- Release date: 2010
- Country: Canada
- Languages: English, Inuktitut

Qimmit a Clash of Two Truths or Qimmit, un choc deux vérités (French title) is a 2010 Canadian documentary film directed by Joelie Sanguya and Ole Gjerstad about the Inuit and events in the years around 1960 that affected their semi-nomadic lifestyle and in particular the killing of their sled dogs (Qimmit). Some believe this was done deliberately by the government to force them off their land. The Qikiqtani Truth Commission looked into the affair and reported that there was no conspiracy. Different viewpoints from the Inuit and the Royal Canadian Mounted Police (RCMP) are heard in the film. The film is co-produced by Piksuk Media and the National Film Board of Canada.

== See also ==
- Okpik's Dream, a related 2015 Canadian documentary film
