= Someone Lives Here =

2023 Canadian documentary film

- Film poster
- Directed by: Zack Russell
- Produced by: Andrew Ferguson; Matt King; Zack Russell
- Starring: Khaleel Seivwright
- Cinematography: Chet Tilokani
- Edited by: Marianna Khoury
- Music by: Bram Gielen
- Production company: LaRue Entertainment
- Release date: May 4, 2023 (Hot Docs)
- Running time: 75 minutes
- Country: Canada
- Language: English

Someone Lives Here is a 2023 Canadian documentary film, directed by Zack Russell. The film profiles Khaleel Seivwright, a carpenter who has launched a project of building small private shelters for homeless people in Toronto during the COVID-19 pandemic, against the bureaucratic resistance of the city government.

The film premiered at the 2023 Hot Docs Canadian International Documentary Festival, where it was named the winner of the Rogers Audience Award.

== Critical response ==
Rachel Ho of Exclaim! praised the film, writing that "Russell may not have had aspirations to become a documentarian, but he sure has a natural knack for it. The film comes in at a lean 75 minutes, the perfect amount of time to tell Seivwright's story and explore the various angles to the greater issue of homelessness in Toronto. It's a simple thing, but particularly for a first-time documentary filmmaker, Russell shows a lot of restraint in not adding unnecessary pomp, ensuring the maximum impact is felt."

The film was named to the Toronto International Film Festival's annual Canada's Top Ten list for 2023.

== Awards ==
It was a nominee for the Allan King Award for Best Documentary Film at the 2023 Directors Guild of Canada awards, and won the award for Best Canadian Documentary Film at the 2023 Vancouver International Film Festival.

The film was shortlisted for the Rogers Best Canadian Documentary Award at the Toronto Film Critics Association Awards 2023, and the Canadian Screen Awards for Best Feature Length Documentary and Best Editing in a Documentary (Marianna Khoury) at the 12th Canadian Screen Awards in 2024.
