= Arnaud Bouquet =

Canadian documentary filmmaker and cinematographer

Arnaud Bouquet is a Canadian documentary filmmaker and cinematographer. He is most noted for his film Last of the Elephant Men, for which he won the Canadian Screen Award for Best Cinematography in a Documentary at the 4th Canadian Screen Awards in 2016.

== Filmography ==
(Source)

- 2005 : Si j'avais un chapeau, documentary corealised with Anaïs Barbeau-Lavalette
- 2007 : Partir pour ses idées
- 2009 : Les Algues bleues
- 2009 : Mohammed Rewind, hort film
- 2010 : Gens du fleuve, web série
- 2010 : Partir autrement
- 2012 : Voyages au bout de la nuit
- 2012 : Haïti m'a bâti
- 2015 : Last of the Elephant Men, documentary corealised with Daniel Ferguson
- 2016 : D'une mère à l'autre
- 2016-2018 : Sexplora
- 2017 : Le petit Jonas
- 2017 : Manger le monde
- 2017 : Les vacances de Monsieur Bruno, corealised with Bruno Blanchet
- 2018 : Pot inc
- 2019 : Entends ma voix
- 2019 : Jeunesse arabe, Yallah!
- 2020 : J'étais là
- 2020 : Allons boire ailleurs
- 2021 : Le Dernier glacier
- 2022 : La Mélancolite
- 2022 : L'Effet papillon
- 2023 : Raël QC
- 2023 : Louise Richer, fidèle en humour
- 2023-2026 : Espèces d'ordures
- 2024 : Serge à Paris, season 1 and 2
- 2025 : Le Grand retour des annulés

== Awards ==
- Vues d'Afrique 2006 : Special mention of the jury for Si j'avais un chapeau
- Canadian Screen Award 2016 : Best Documentary and Best Cinematography in a Documentary for Last of the Elephant Men
- Prix Gémeaux 2016 : Best Documentary and Best Cinematography in a Documentary for Last of the Elephant Men
- Prix Gémeaux 2022 : Best Direction for Le Dernier glacier
- Prix Gémeaux 2026 : Best Direction for Espèces d'ordures
