= Last of the Elephant Men =

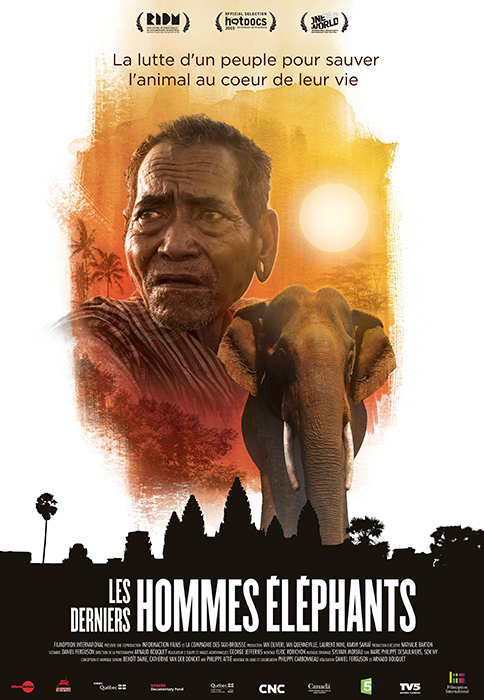
- Film poster
- Directed by: Arnaud Bouquet; Daniel Ferguson
- Written by: Daniel Ferguson
- Produced by: Nathalie Barton; Laurent Mini; Ian Oliveri; Ian Quenneville; Karim Samai
- Cinematography: Arnaud Bouquet
- Edited by: Elric Robichon
- Music by: Sylvain Moreau
- Distributed by: InformAction; Filmoption International
- Release dates: November 2014 (Rencontres internationales du documentaire de Montréal); April 26, 2015 (Hot Docs)
- Running time: 90 minutes
- Country: Canada
- Language: English

Last of the Elephant Men is a Canadian documentary film, which was released in 2015. Directed by Arnaud Bouquet and Daniel Ferguson, the film profiles the Bunong people of Cambodia, focusing in particular on their unique bond with the local population of elephants.

The film received three Canadian Screen Awards at the 4th Canadian Screen Awards in 2016, in the categories of Best Feature Length Documentary, Best Editing in a Documentary (Elric Robichon) and Best Cinematography in a Documentary (Arnaud Bouquet).
