= Sunnyside (Canadian TV series) =

Canadian sketch comedy series

- Genre: Sketch comedy
- Created by: Dan Redican; Gary Pearson
- Written by: Gary Pearson; Dan Redican; Kathleen Phillips; Jan Caruana; Alastair Forbes
- Directed by: Shawn Alex Thomson; Jeff Beesley; Dawn Wilkinson; Steve Wright
- Starring: Pat Thornton; Patrice Goodman; Alice Moran; Kevin Vidal; Kathleen Phillips; Rob Norman; Norm Macdonald
- Composer: James Jandrisch
- Country of origin: Canada
- Original language: English
- No. of seasons: 1
- No. of episodes: 13

Production
- Executive producers: Dan Redican; Gary Pearson; Dan Bennett; Shane Corkery; Anton Leo; Phyllis Laing; Mark Gingras
- Producers: Rhonda Baker; Paula Smith
- Running time: 30 minutes
- Production companies: Counterfeit Pictures; Buffalo Gal Pictures

Original release
- Network: City
- Release: January 8 – November 8, 2015

Sunnyside is a Canadian sketch comedy television series, which premiered January 9, 2015 on City. Created by Dan Redican and Gary Pearson, the series is set in the fictional neighbourhood of Sunnyside and features sketches depicting various eccentric recurring characters living there. The show was cancelled after one season, although City has sometimes reaired the episodes in repeats.

The cast includes Pat Thornton, Patrice Goodman, Alice Moran, Kevin Vidal, Kathleen Phillips, Rob Norman and Norm Macdonald. The show was filmed in Winnipeg, Manitoba.

Redican and Pearson had each approached Rogers Communications with individual show ideas; Redican's pitch was Our Street, an ensemble series about the quirky residents of an urban neighbourhood, while Pearson's was Dark Roast, about the quirky customers of a coffee shop. Neither pitch was accepted as presented, but Rogers asked them to combine their ideas into a single show. They agreed and created Sunnyside, patterning their fictional neighbourhood after Toronto's Parkdale.

Macdonald appears on the show only in voice form, as the neighbourhood's surreal alternate reality version of the Internet: a sentient sewer line which can answer search queries shouted into a manhole.

== Episodes ==
Season	Episodes	Originally released	
Season	Episodes	First released	Last released
1	13	January 8, 2015	November 8, 2015

=== Season 1 (2015) ===
No.	Title	Original release date
1	"The Top Hat"	January 8, 2015
When a magical top hat blows into Sunnyside, it turns Billy the Bum's luck around. Paranormal Activity affects a couple's love life.
2	"Ponies"	January 15, 2015
A new alternate reality store opens in Sunnyside.
3	"Baxter"	January 22, 2015
Viola suspects her dog, Baxter, is cheating on her. Quennel suffers from an acute case of smartphone withdrawal. Rookie Kerri finds it hard to run a RIDE program once Peter falls madly in love with her.
4	"Australia"	January 29, 2015
When the moon explodes life in Sunnyside goes on as usual, until moon debris starts to fall to earth.
5	"The Chain Gang"	February 5, 2015
Prisoners are transferred to the new Sunnyside super jail despite the fact that it hasn't been built yet.
6	"Clowns"	February 12, 2015
Prejudge rears its ugly head when Sunnyside comes face to face with clown culture.
7	"War is Hell"	September 27, 2015
When war breaks out in Sunnyside, not much changes for the locals.
8	"Volcano"	October 4, 2015
No one listens to Eugene's warnings until a volcano erupts in Sunnyside.
9	"Hole Day"	October 11, 2015
The Hole wants to give back to Sunnyside on a holiday.
10	"Bobo"	October 18, 2015
A little girl's imaginary friend, Bobo, turns out to be a local meth addict.
11	"Shaytan's Nemesis"	October 25, 2015
Shaytan, the local embodiment of evil, is pretty upset when Jesus arrives.
12	"Sunnyside Tours"	November 1, 2015
A group of tourists are less than impressed by the best Sunnyside has to offer. Meanwhile Mayor Fred gathers up all the geriatrics for the Old People's Picnic, which doesn't bode well for the old people.
13	"The Rapture"	November 8, 2015
The rapture zaps worthy people up to heaven, but plenty are still left behind.

== Reception ==
Television critics reviewed the show favourably, with Brad Oswald of the Winnipeg Free Press calling it "Canada's best sketch-comedy TV effort since Codco and The Kids in the Hall arrived in rapid succession in the late '80s", and John Doyle of The Globe and Mail calling the show "daft but deftly skewering the ripe pickings of contemporary ludicrousness". Doyle also criticized the network for scheduling the show to air directly opposite The Big Bang Theory, stating that the show "deserves a much bigger potential audience than that offered in this suicide-slot."

The cast collectively won the Canadian Screen Award for Best Performance in a Variety or Sketch Comedy Program or Series at the 4th Canadian Screen Awards in 2016.
