= Sam Richardson (actor) =

American actor and comedian (born 1984)

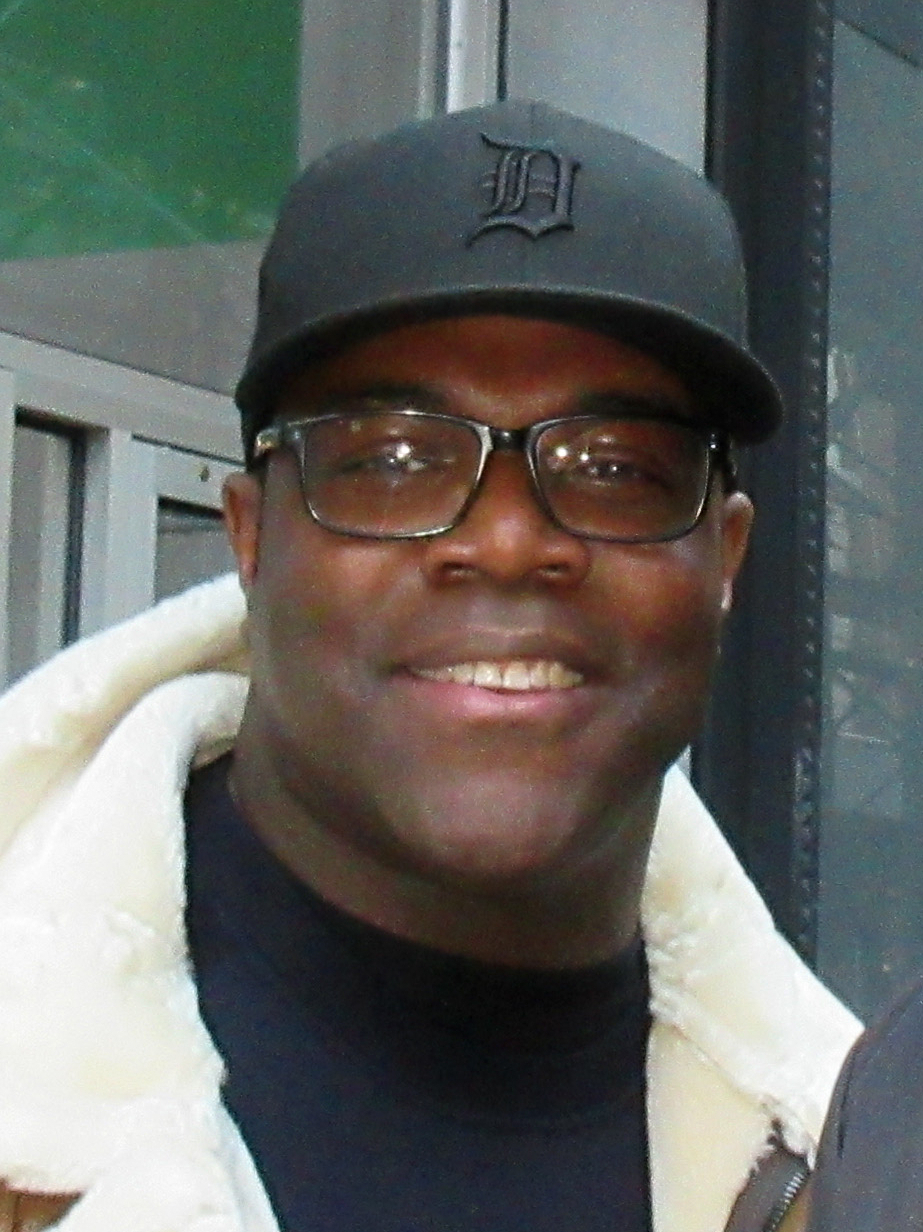
- Richardson in January 2019
- Born: January 12, 1984 (age 42); Detroit, Michigan, United States
- Occupations: Actor; comedian; writer; producer
- Years active: 2004–present
- Known for: Veep; Detroiters; The Afterparty; Velma

Sam Richardson (born January 12, 1984) is an American actor and comedian. He is best known for co-starring in the Comedy Central comedy series Detroiters (2017–2018) alongside Tim Robinson, playing Richard Splett in the HBO political comedy series Veep (2012–2019), and for playing various characters in the Netflix sketch show I Think You Should Leave with Tim Robinson (2019–2023), Aniq Adjaye in the Apple TV+ series The Afterparty (2022–2023), and Norville Rogers in the Max animated series Velma (2023–2024). In 2022 and 2023, he was nominated for the Primetime Emmy Award for Outstanding Guest Actor in a Comedy Series for his performance as Edwin Akufo in Ted Lasso, winning in 2023.

== Early life ==
Richardson was born in Detroit, Michigan, on January 12, 1984, the son of a Ghanaian mother and an African-American father. His aunt was Barbara-Rose Collins (née Richardson), who in 1990 became the first Black woman from Michigan to be elected to the United States Congress. Every year Richardson would travel with his parents to Ghana, where his grandfather was a chief and local political leader. He graduated from the University of Detroit Jesuit High School and Academy in 2002, and studied theater at Wayne State University.

== Career ==
Early in his career, Richardson performed at the Second City in Detroit and then in Chicago. At Second City, he was known for a wide range of characters, from sight gags to impressions of public figures.

Following a move to Los Angeles, Richardson appeared in six episodes (including the series finale) of The Office and a season 4 episode of Arrested Development. He has also appeared on episodes of Drunk History, New Girl, Teachers, and six episodes of Harder Than It Looks. He played Richard Splett on the HBO political comedy series Veep, first appearing in four episodes during season 3 as the handler for Selina Meyer during her Iowa book tour. During season 4, Richardson was made a regular cast member of the show, after his character received a job offer in President Meyer's administration as an assistant to the character Jonah. He has also appeared in films including We're the Millers, Horrible Bosses 2, Spy, Neighbors 2: Sorority Rising, Mike and Dave Need Wedding Dates, and Ghostbusters.

In 2015, Comedy Central ordered a pilot for the series Detroiters, created by Richardson and Tim Robinson. The show stars Richardson and Robinson, who also co-wrote and co-executive produced the series with others. Comedy Central then ordered ten episodes of the series, which began shooting in the Detroit area in 2016. According to Detroit Free Press, "In the series, Richardson and Robinson play struggling advertising men in Detroit who make local TV commercials. The plot was inspired partly by the classic Detroit ads they grew up watching, including the Mel Farr Superstar and Gordy from ABC Warehouse campaigns." Detroiters ran for two seasons before its cancellation by Comedy Central in 2018.

In 2016, Richardson was nominated for the Best Performance in a Variety or Sketch Comedy Program or Series (Individual or Ensemble) award at the Canadian Screen Awards for his work on The Second City Project. He was also nominated for the Outstanding Performance by an Ensemble in a Comedy Series at the 2015, 2016, 2017, and 2018 Screen Actors Guild Awards for his work on Veep, winning the last one. In 2018, he began playing Alf in the YouTube Premium series Champaign ILL. Since 2019, he has played various characters in the Netflix sketch show I Think You Should Leave with Tim Robinson.

In 2022, Richardson appeared in the first US advertising campaign for Midea, a Fortune Global 500 appliances company. The humorous campaign featured Richardson as a fictional Chief Idea Officer who takes credit for Midea products, calling them "My Ideas" and claiming to be "the man behind the best ideas, at the world's best appliance company."

In 2022, Richardson was in the main cast of the Apple TV+ mystery comedy series The Afterparty. That same year he appeared as Gilbert, the owner of the Olde Salem Magic Shoppe, in Hocus Pocus 2, a sequel to the 1993 film, Hocus Pocus.

== Filmography ==
Key
†	Denotes films that have not yet been released

=== Film ===
Year	Title	Role	Notes
2007	The Planning Lady	Police Officer	Short film
2010	Superman vs. The Office	Sam	Short film
2013	We're the Millers	TSA Agent	
2013	The Rule of Threes	Jeff	Short film
2013	Crash Site	Ben	Short film
2014	Horrible Bosses 2	The Producer	
2015	Spy	John	
2015	The Night Is Young	Sam	
2016	Neighbors 2: Sorority Rising	Eric Baiers	
2016	Mike and Dave Need Wedding Dates	Eric Huddle	
2016	Ghostbusters	Basement Cop	
2016	Office Christmas Party	Joel	
2017	The House	Marty	
2018	Game Over, Man!	Donald	
2018	Ralph Breaks the Internet	Lee the Office Nerd	Voice role
2019	Good Boys	Officer Sacks	
2020	Promising Young Woman	Paul	
2020	Superintelligence	Agent John Donahue	
2020	Hooking Up	Bailey Brighton	
2021	Werewolves Within	Finn Wheeler	Producer
2021	The Tomorrow War	Charlie	
2022	Family Squares	Alex	
2022	Senior Year	Seth Novacelik	
2022	Hocus Pocus 2	Gilbert	
2023	Somebody I Used to Know	Dar	
2023	Ruby Gillman, Teenage Kraken	Brill	Voice role
2024	The 4:30 Movie	Major Murder	
2025	Sacrifice	Oliver	
2026	Hoppers	Conner	Voice role
2026	Matchbox: The Movie †	Crosby	Post-production
2026	The Angry Birds Movie 3 †	TBA	Voice role; in production
2026	Bad Day †	TBA	Post-production
TBA	Monkey Quest †	TBA	Voice role; post-production

=== Television ===
Year	Title	Role	Notes
2012	Harder Than It Looks	Sam	Recurring role
2012–2013	The Office	Colin	6 episodes
2013	Arrested Development	TSA Agent	Episode: "Flight of the Phoenix"
2014–2019	Veep	Richard Splett	Recurring role (season 3), main cast (seasons 4–7)
2015	Drunk History	Jim Brown	Episode: "Cleveland"
2015	The Sixth Lead	Security Guard	2 episodes
2015	The Second City Project	Various	Web series and a television special, main cast; also writer
2016	Teachers	Mr. Jackson	Episode: "The Last Day"
2016	Son of Zorn	Businessman	Episode: "Return to Orange County"
2016	Lip Sync Battle	Himself	Episode: "Sam Richardson vs. T.J. Miller"
2016, 2018	New Girl	Dunston	2 episodes
2017	Portlandia	Amore Rep	Episode: "Amore"
2017	The Comedy Jam	Himself	Episode: "Sam Richardson/Jesse Tyler Ferguson/Awkwafina"
2017–2018	Detroiters	Sam Duvet	Main cast; also co-creator, co-writer and an executive producer
2018	Champaign ILL	Alf	Main cast; also executive producer
2018	Dessert Island	Sandor	Voice role
2018	Ghosted	Sam	Episode: "The Wire"
2018–2019	Rise of the Teenage Mutant Ninja Turtles	Muninn	Voice role, main cast
2019	Relics and Rarities	Ionis Leatherfoot	Episode: "The Trial of the Hidden Ones"
2019	Archer	Bort the Garj	Voice role, 2 episodes
2019	Conan Without Borders	Himself	Episode: "Ghana"
2019	Human Discoveries	Bog	Voice role, main cast
2019	Room 104	Greg	Episode: "Drywall Guys"
2019–2020	BoJack Horseman	Dr. Champ	Recurring voice role (season 6)
2019–2023	I Think You Should Leave with Tim Robinson	Various	5 episodes
2020	Curb Your Enthusiasm	Will Cooper	Episode: "The Spite Store"
2020	Dream Corp, LLC	Patient 44	Episode: "Tricky Ricky"
2020	Hoops	Marcus	Recurring voice role
2020	Woke	Toast	Voice role, 3 episodes
2020–2021	The Fungies!	Cool James, Mr. Mayor	Recurring voice role
2020–2022	Star Trek: Lower Decks	Vendome	Voice role, 2 episodes
2021	M.O.D.O.K.	Garfield "Gary" Garoldson	Voice role, main cast
2021	Q-Force	Greg	Voice role, 3 episodes
2021	Nailed It!	Himself	Episode: "Paranormal Pastries"
2021–2023	Ted Lasso	Edwin Akufo	3 episodes
2021–2023	HouseBroken	Chico	Voice role, main cast
2022	Harley Quinn	Swamp Thing	Voice role, 2 episodes
2022	Little Demon	Asmodeus	Voice role, episode: "Possession Obsession"
2022	Central Park	Mayor Leeds	Voice role, 4 episodes
2022–2023	The Afterparty	Aniq Adjaye	Main cast
2023	History of the World, Part II	Thomas A. Watson	Episode: "III"
2023	Human Resources	Tony	Voice role, episode: "Tony: The Life of an Office Cold"
2023	Clone High	Wesley	Voice role, episode: "For Your Consideration"
2023–2024	Mulligan	Simon Prioleau	Voice role, main cast
2023–2024	Velma	Norville Rogers	Voice role, main cast
2024	It's Florida, Man	Phil	Episode: "Toes"
2024	Everybody Still Hates Chris		Voice role, 2 episodes
2024	Yo Gabba Gabbaland	Himself	Episode: "Outside"
2024–2025	Krapopolis	Hades	Voice role, 3 episodes
2024–2025	Sausage Party: Foodtopia	Julius	Voice role; main cast
2025	Star Trek: Section 31	Quasi	TV movie
2025	Bob's Burgers	Dave	Voice role; episode: "Snackface"
2025	Poker Face	Kendall Hines	Episode: "One Last Job"
2026	St. Denis Medical	Michael	Episode: "Nod and Agree"
2026	President Curtis	Two-Toes, Booger	Voice role; 2 episodes

== Awards and nominations ==
Year	Award	Category	Nominated work	Result	Ref.
2015	Screen Actors Guild Awards	Outstanding Ensemble in a Comedy Series	Veep	Nominated	
2017	Screen Actors Guild Awards	Outstanding Ensemble in a Comedy Series	Veep	Nominated	
2018	Screen Actors Guild Awards	Outstanding Ensemble in a Comedy Series	Veep	Won	
2022	Primetime Emmy Awards	Outstanding Guest Actor in a Comedy Series	Ted Lasso: "Midnight Train to Royston"	Nominated	
2023	Primetime Emmy Awards	Outstanding Guest Actor in a Comedy Series	Ted Lasso: "International Break"	Won	
