= Kathleen Phillips =

Canadian actress

- Occupations: Comedian, actor
- Spouse: Chris Locke

Kathleen Phillips is a Canadian actress based in Toronto, Ontario. She is most noted for her roles in the sketch comedy series Sunnyside, for which she and the other core cast collectively won the Canadian Screen Award for Best Performance in a Variety or Sketch Comedy Program or Series at the 4th Canadian Screen Awards in 2016, and Mr. D, for which she was a Canadian Screen Award nominee for Best Supporting Actress in a Comedy Series at the 5th Canadian Screen Awards in 2017.

A native of Keswick, Ontario, she is a graduate of Ryerson University's theatre school. She has also performed in the sketch comedy web series Terrific Women, and on stage with The Sketchersons and Laugh Sabbath. She has also created a number of one-woman character comedy shows, including Kathleen Phillips Is Besides Herself.

She is married to actor and comedian Chris Locke.

== Filmography ==
=== Film ===
| Year | Title | Role | Notes |
|---|---|---|---|
| 2002 | Secondary High | Snatch | |
| 2009 | Rehearsing Shakespeare | Actress Rehearsing | Short film |
| 2010 | The Old Ways | Mother | Short film |
| 2010 | Turkey | Ally | Short film |
| 2011 | Unlucky | Ms. Neves | |
| 2012 | Buyer's Market | Sabrina | Short film |
| 2013 | Ben | Ben | Short film |
| 2013 | Bridge's New Jacket | Sr. Lady Adventurer | Short film |
| 2013 | Pop the Grapes | Melanie | Short film |
| 2014 | An Apartment | Rose | Short film |
| 2014 | Apartment 2B | Megan | Short film |
| 2017 | Filth City | Eve Knight | Also released in episodic form |

=== Television ===
| Year | Title | Role | Notes |
|---|---|---|---|
| 2008 | House Party | Hannah | 6 episodes |
| 2009 | Hotbox | | 9 episodes |
| 2011 | InSecurity | Penny | 1 episode |
| 2011 | Good Dog | Fundraiser #1 | 1 episode |
| 2011 | Dan for Mayor | Joan Nivens | 1 episode |
| 2011 | Goodbye Sara Hennessey | Witch | 1 episode |
| 2014 | The Ron James Show | | 1 episode |
| 2014–2022 | Odd Squad | Triangle Sue, Circle Sue | 3 episodes |
| 2015 | Sunnyside | Various characters | 13 episodes |
| 2015–2018 | Mr. D | Emma Terdie | 22 episodes |
| 2017 | Bruno & Boots: The Wizzle War | Ms. Gloria Peabody | TV Movie |
| 2017 | Terrific Women | Pam | 4 episodes |
| 2017 | My Kitchen Can Be Anything | Kathleen | 1 episode |
| 2020 | Workin' Moms | Sabrina | 1 episode, also writing credits on 5 episodes |
