= Zack Russell =

Canadian writer and filmmaker

Zack Russell is a Canadian writer and filmmaker.

He previously worked in theatre, most notably collaborating with Sook-Yin Lee on the 2019 play Unsafe for Canadian Stage, and has also directed the short film 7A and episodes of the web series True Dating Stories. His 2015 short film She Stoops to Conquer was the winner of the Canadian Screen Award for Best Live Action Short Drama at the 4th Canadian Screen Awards in 2016.

His debut documentary film, Someone Lives Here, premiered at the 2023 Hot Docs Canadian International Documentary Festival, where it was named the winner of the Rogers Audience Award.
