= Alice Moran =

Canadian actress and writer

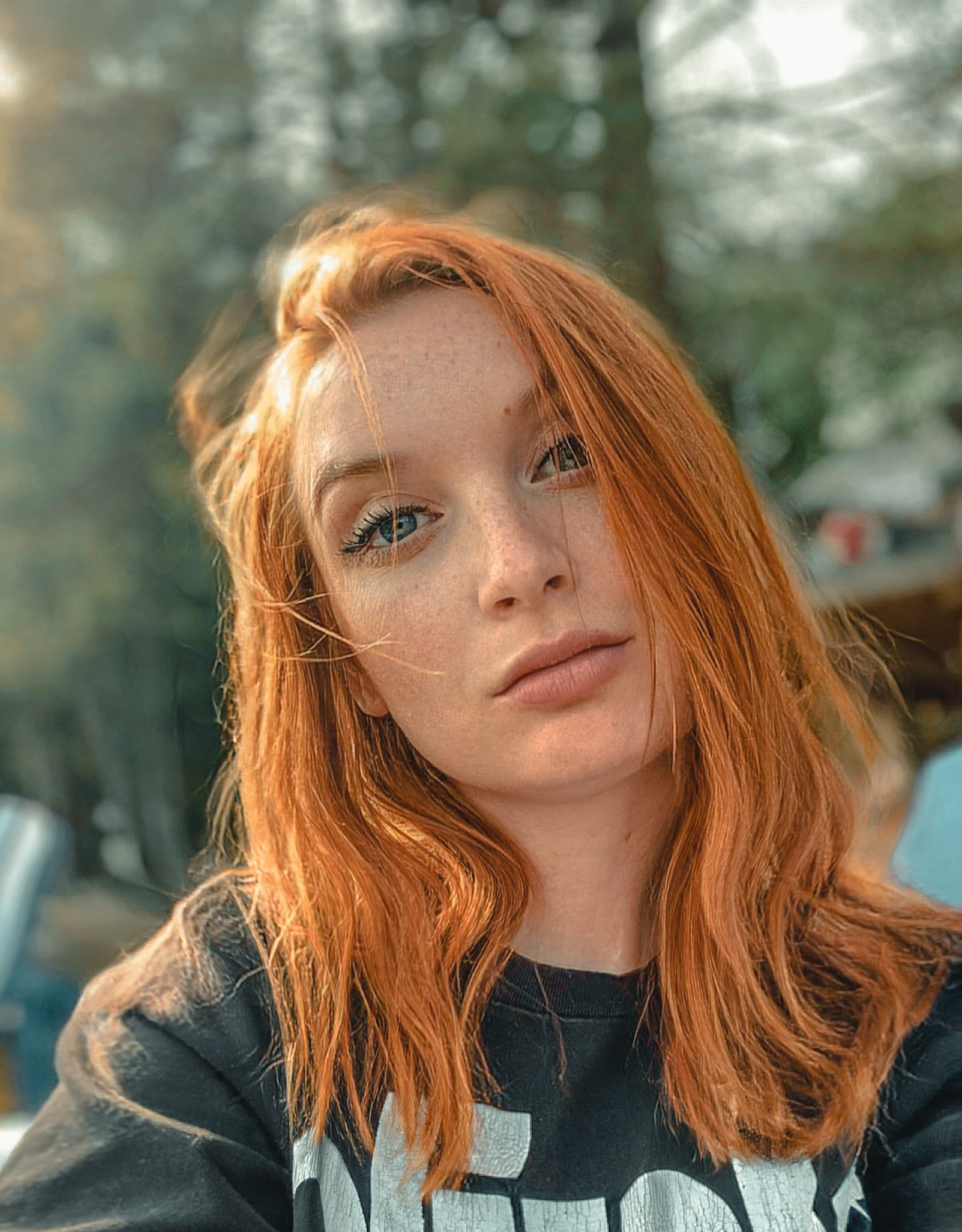
- Alice Moran in May 2023.
- Occupations: Actress, writer
- Years active: 2011–present
- Awards: Canadian Screen Award; 2016 Sunnyside

Alice Moran is a Canadian actress and writer. Moran has appeared or starred in several Canadian television series, including the CBC Television series Crawford.

== Career ==
Moran grew up in St. Albert, Alberta and later Red Deer, Alberta. When her family moved to Ontario, she began performing improv and competed in the Canadian Improv Games. At the age of 18, Moran began working for The Second City, first as a member of their educational company and later in the national touring company. With Second City, she created several videos for their YouTube channel, including "Hogwarts: Which House are you?".

On March 13, 2016, she won a Canadian Screen Award with the cast of Sunnyside in the category of Best Performance in a Variety or Sketch Comedy Program or Series. In 2018, Moran won a Canadian Comedy Award for her performance in Crawford.

== Personal life ==
Moran is a lifelong supporter of the Edmonton Oilers and the Toronto Blue Jays. Moran currently resides in Toronto, Ontario.

== Filmography ==
=== Television ===
| Year | Title | Role | Notes |
|---|---|---|---|
| 2013 | The Ron James Show | Various roles | 2 episodes |
| 2014 | Space Janitors | Princess Dian | 1 episode |
| 2015 | Sunnyside | Various roles | 13 episodes |
| 2015 | Too Much Information | Herself | 6 episodes |
| 2016 | Man Seeking Woman | Maya | 3 episodes |
| 2018 | Crawford | Wendy | 12 episodes |
| 2018 | The Beaverton | Julia | 1 episode |
| 2020 | Decoys | Mary Jane | 6 episodes |
