= Way to Go (interactive) =

2015 interactive film and VR experience

- Website type: Web-based interactive film
- Available in: English/French
- Owner: National Film Board of Canada/France Télévisions
- Creators: Vincent Morisset, Philippe Lambert, Édouard Lanctôt-Benoit and Caroline Robert (AATOAA)
- Website: http://a-way-to-go.com/
- Launched: 2015

Way to Go (French: Jusqu'ici) is a 2015 Canada/France interactive film and virtual reality web-based experience created by the Montreal digital studio AATOAA (Vincent Morisset, Philippe Lambert, Édouard Lanctôt-Benoit and Caroline Robert) and produced by National Film Board of Canada (Hugues Sweeney) and France Télévisions. The production lets users take a virtual walk in the woods, through a combination of animation and immersive video.

== User experience ==
In February 2016, Animation World Network's Jennifer Wolfe described the user experience as follows:

Users pilot a block-headed, hand-drawn avatar through the experience, they can pause to examine the world around them, sometimes triggering a strange tunnel vision effect that shifts the perspective to a first-person POV. During the seemingly endless journey, the world oscillates between black-and-white live action and a colored, lo-res digital mode. Eighty-three custom shaders change lights, grain and visual effects in real time while thousands of sounds are live mixed and synced to user interaction. The music score itself, composed by Philippe Lambert, is generative, responding to the viewer’s pace as they amble (or fly) through the forest.

== Reception ==
Way to Go was unveiled as VR installation at the 2015 Sundance Film Festival’s New Frontier showcase. Awards to date include three 2016 Webby Awards, Webby and People's Voice awards in the Web/NetArt category as well as the Webby Award for Online Film & Video/VR: Gaming, Interactive or Real-Time. On 27 April 2015, it was named Cutting Edge Project of the Week at the Favourite Website Awards.
