= Mummies Alive =

Television series

Mummies Alive is a 2015 six-part television historical documentary series about mummies, that was shown on various networks, including on Smithsonian Channel (US), History (Canada), Yesterday (UK), ZDF (Germany), and SBS One (Australia). It was produced by Saloon Media and Impossible Factual, in association with Shaw Media. Directed by Mick Grogan and narrated by Jason Priestley, the six one-hour episodes center around mummies that have been found all around the world and the stories and legends surrounding their deaths.

== Episodes ==
1. The Gunslinger Mummy
2. Buried in a Bog
3. Otzi the Iceman
4. The Inca Maiden
5. The Pharaoh's Secret
6. The Hero of Herculaneum
