= List of accolades received by Room =

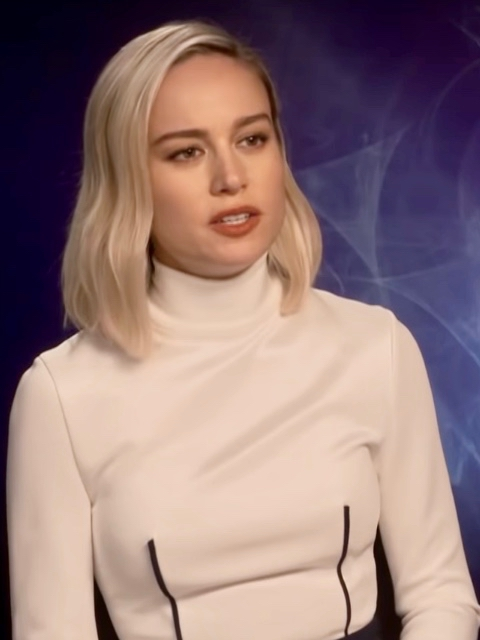
- Brie Larson's universally acclaimed portrayal of Ma garnered numerous accolades and nominations.
Accolades
Award	Won	Nominated
AACTA Awards	0	1
Academy Awards	1	4
Alliance of Women Film Journalists	1	6
American Film Institute	1	1
Austin Film Critics Association	3	4
BFI London Film Festival	0	1
British Academy Film Awards	1	2
British Independent Film Awards	1	1
Calgary International Film Festival	1	1
Camerimage	0	1
Canadian Screen Awards	9	11
Casting Society of America	1	1
Chicago Film Critics Association	2	3
Critics' Choice Awards	2	4
Dallas–Fort Worth Film Critics Association	1	2
Detroit Film Critics Society	0	3
Dorian Awards	0	2
Empire Awards	0	2
Florida Film Critics Circle	1	3
Golden Globes Awards	1	3
Golden Trailer Awards	0	2
Gotham Independent Film Awards	0	1
Hamptons International Film Festival	1	1
Heartland Film Festival	1	1
Houston Film Critics Society	1	4
Independent Spirit Awards	2	3
Irish Film & Television Academy	7	8
London Film Critics' Circle	0	4
Mill Valley Film Festival	1	1
MTV Movie Awards	0	1
National Board of Review	3	3
New Orleans Film Festival	1	1
New York Film Critics Online	1	1
Online Film Critics Society	0	3
San Diego Film Critics Society	3	7
San Francisco Film Critics Circle	0	2
Satellite Awards	0	4
Saturn Awards	1	2
Screen Actors Guild Awards	1	2
St. Louis Film Critics Association	1	3
Teen Choice Awards	0	2
Toronto Film Critics Association	0	1
Toronto International Film Festival	1	1
Vancouver Film Critics Circle	5	8
Vancouver International Film Festival	1	1
Warsaw International Film Festival	1	1
Washington D.C. Area Film Critics Association	2	3
Women Film Critics Circle	2	4
- Total number of awards and nominations
Totals	62	131
- References

Room is a 2015 British-American-Canadian-Irish drama film directed by Lenny Abrahamson. It is an adaptation of Emma Donoghue's novel of the same name who also wrote the screenplay. Brie Larson stars as Joy Newsome, an abducted mother held captive for seven years with her five-year-old son Jack, played by Jacob Tremblay. Joan Allen, William H. Macy, and Sean Bridgers feature in supporting roles in the film. Room premiered at the Telluride Film Festival on September 4, 2015, with A24 later providing the film a wide release on January 22, 2016, at over 800 theaters in the United States and Canada. The film grossed a worldwide box office total of over $35 million on a production budget of $13 million. Rotten Tomatoes, a review aggregator, surveyed 303 reviews and judged 93 percent to be positive.

The film garnered awards and nominations in a variety of categories with particular praise for its direction, screenplay and the performances of Larson and Tremblay. Room earned eleven nominations at the 4th Canadian Screen Awards, winning nine including Best Motion Picture, Best Achievement in Direction for Abrahamson, Best Actor in a Leading Role for Tremblay, and Best Actress in a Leading Role for Larson. At the 13th Irish Film & Television Awards, Room won seven awards including Best Film, Best Director for Abrahamson, and Best International Actress for Larson.

At the 88th Academy Awards, Room received four nominations, including Best Picture, Best Director for Abrahamson and Best Adapted Screenplay for Donoghue. Larson went on to win for Best Actress. She also received awards in the Best Actress category at the 73rd Golden Globe Awards, 69th British Academy Film Awards, and 22nd Screen Actors Guild Awards. Donoghue was nominated at the former two award ceremonies, and also won the Independent Spirit Award for Best First Screenplay. Both the National Board of Review, and the American Film Institute included the film in their respective list of the top ten of the year.

== Accolades ==
Award	Date of ceremony	Category	Recipient(s)	Result	Ref(s)
AACTA Awards	December 9, 2015	Best Actress – International	Brie Larson	Nominated	
Academy Awards	February 28, 2016	Best Picture	Ed Guiney	Nominated	
Academy Awards	February 28, 2016	Best Director	Lenny Abrahamson	Nominated	
Academy Awards	February 28, 2016	Best Actress	Brie Larson	Won	
Academy Awards	February 28, 2016	Best Adapted Screenplay	Emma Donoghue	Nominated	
Alliance of Women Film Journalists	January 13, 2016	Best Film	Room	Nominated	
Alliance of Women Film Journalists	January 13, 2016	Best Director	Lenny Abrahamson	Nominated	
Alliance of Women Film Journalists	January 13, 2016	Best Adapted Screenplay	Emma Donoghue	Nominated	
Alliance of Women Film Journalists	January 13, 2016	Best Actress	Brie Larson	Nominated	
Alliance of Women Film Journalists	January 13, 2016	Best Woman Screenwriter	Emma Donoghue	Nominated	
Alliance of Women Film Journalists	January 13, 2016	Best Breakthrough Performance	Brie Larson	Nominated	
American Film Institute	December 16, 2015	Top Ten Films of the Year	Room	Won	
Austin Film Critics Association	December 29, 2015	Best Actor	Jacob Tremblay	Nominated	
Austin Film Critics Association	December 29, 2015	Best Actress	Brie Larson	Won	
Austin Film Critics Association	December 29, 2015	Best Adapted Screenplay	Emma Donoghue	Won	
Austin Film Critics Association	December 29, 2015	Breakthrough Artist	Jacob Tremblay	Won	
BFI London Film Festival	October 26, 2015	Best Film	Room	Nominated	
BAFTA Awards	February 14, 2016	Best Actress	Brie Larson	Won	
BAFTA Awards	February 14, 2016	Best Adapted Screenplay	Emma Donoghue	Nominated	
British Independent Film Awards	December 6, 2015	Best International Independent Film	Room	Won	
Calgary International Film Festival	October 7, 2015	Audience Choice Award – Narrative Feature	Room	Won (Note: Shared with Remember)	
Camerimage	November 21, 2015	Golden Frog for Best Cinematography	Danny Cohen	Nominated	
Canadian Screen Awards	March 13, 2016	Best Motion Picture	David Gross, and Ed Guiney	Won	
Canadian Screen Awards	March 13, 2016	Best Achievement in Direction	Lenny Abrahamson	Won	
Canadian Screen Awards	March 13, 2016	Best Actor in a Leading Role	Jacob Tremblay	Won	
Canadian Screen Awards	March 13, 2016	Best Actress in a Leading Role	Brie Larson	Won	
Canadian Screen Awards	March 13, 2016	Best Actress in a Supporting Role	Joan Allen	Won	
Canadian Screen Awards	March 13, 2016	Best Adapted Screenplay	Emma Donoghue	Won	
Canadian Screen Awards	March 13, 2016	Best Art Direction and Production Design	Ethan Tobman, and Mary Kirkland	Won	
Canadian Screen Awards	March 13, 2016	Best Cinematography	Danny Cohen	Nominated	
Canadian Screen Awards	March 13, 2016	Best Editing	Nathan Nugent	Won	
Canadian Screen Awards	March 13, 2016	Best Original Score	Stephen Rennicks	Nominated	
Canadian Screen Awards	March 13, 2016	Best Make-Up	Sid Armour	Won	
Casting Society of America	January 21, 2016	Feature Film Studio or Independent Drama	Fiona Weir, Robin D. Cook, Kathleen Chopin, and Jonathan Oliveira	Won	
Chicago Film Critics Association	December 16, 2015	Best Actress	Brie Larson	Won	
Chicago Film Critics Association	December 16, 2015	Most Promising Performer	Jacob Tremblay	Won	
Chicago Film Critics Association	December 16, 2015	Best Adapted Screenplay	Emma Donoghue	Nominated	
Critics' Choice Awards	January 17, 2016	Best Picture	Room	Nominated	
Critics' Choice Awards	January 17, 2016	Best Actress	Brie Larson	Won	
Critics' Choice Awards	January 17, 2016	Best Young Performer	Jacob Tremblay	Won	
Critics' Choice Awards	January 17, 2016	Best Adapted Screenplay	Emma Donoghue	Nominated	
Dallas–Fort Worth Film Critics Association	December 14, 2015	Best Actress	Brie Larson	Won	
Dallas–Fort Worth Film Critics Association	December 14, 2015	Best Screenplay	Emma Donoghue	Nominated	
Detroit Film Critics Society	December 14, 2015	Best Actress	Brie Larson	Nominated	
Detroit Film Critics Society	December 14, 2015	Best Supporting Actor	Jacob Tremblay	Nominated	
Detroit Film Critics Society	December 14, 2015	Best Breakthrough	Jacob Tremblay	Nominated	
Dorian Awards	January 19, 2016	Performance of the Year – Actress	Brie Larson	Nominated	
Dorian Awards	January 19, 2016	Screenplay of the Year	Emma Donoghue	Nominated	
Empire Awards	March 20, 2016	Best Male Newcomer	Jacob Tremblay	Nominated	
Empire Awards	March 20, 2016	Best Actress	Brie Larson	Nominated	
Florida Film Critics Circle	December 23, 2015	Best Actress	Brie Larson	Won	
Florida Film Critics Circle	December 23, 2015	Best Adapted Screenplay	Emma Donoghue	Nominated	
Florida Film Critics Circle	December 23, 2015	FFCC Breakout Award	Jacob Tremblay	Nominated	
Golden Globe Awards	January 10, 2016	Best Motion Picture – Drama	Room	Nominated	
Golden Globe Awards	January 10, 2016	Best Actress in a Motion Picture – Drama	Brie Larson	Won	
Golden Globe Awards	January 10, 2016	Best Screenplay	Emma Donoghue	Nominated	
Golden Trailer Awards	May 4, 2016	Best Independent Trailer	"Outside"	Nominated	
Golden Trailer Awards	May 4, 2016	Best Independent Trailer	"Room"	Nominated	
Gotham Independent Film Awards	November 30, 2015	Best Actress	Brie Larson	Nominated	
Hamptons International Film Festival	October 14, 2015	Best Narrative Feature	Room	Won	
Heartland Film Festival	October 25, 2015	Truly Moving Picture Award	Room	Won	
Houston Film Critics Society	January 9, 2016	Best Picture	Room	Nominated	
Houston Film Critics Society	January 9, 2016	Best Actress	Brie Larson	Won	
Houston Film Critics Society	January 9, 2016	Best Director	Lenny Abrahamson	Nominated	
Houston Film Critics Society	January 9, 2016	Best Screenplay	Emma Donoghue	Nominated	
Independent Spirit Awards	February 27, 2016	Best Female Lead	Brie Larson	Won	
Independent Spirit Awards	February 27, 2016	Best First Screenplay	Emma Donoghue	Won	
Independent Spirit Awards	February 27, 2016	Best Editing	Nathan Nugent	Nominated	
Irish Film & Television Academy	April 9, 2016	Best Film	Room	Won	
Irish Film & Television Academy	April 9, 2016	Best Director	Lenny Abrahamson	Won	
Irish Film & Television Academy	April 9, 2016	Best Scriptwriter	Emma Donoghue	Won	
Irish Film & Television Academy	April 9, 2016	Best Editing	Nathan Nugent	Won	
Irish Film & Television Academy	April 9, 2016	Best Sound	Niall Brady, Steve Fanagan, and Ken Galvin	Won	
Irish Film & Television Academy	April 9, 2016	Best Original Music	Stephen Rennicks	Won	
Irish Film & Television Academy	April 9, 2016	Best International Actress	Brie Larson	Won	
Irish Film & Television Academy	April 9, 2016	Best International Actor	Jacob Tremblay	Nominated	
London Film Critics' Circle	January 17, 2016	Film of the Year	Room	Nominated	
London Film Critics' Circle	January 17, 2016	Actress of the Year	Brie Larson	Nominated	
London Film Critics' Circle	January 17, 2016	Screenwriter of the Year	Emma Donoghue	Nominated	
London Film Critics' Circle	January 17, 2016	Breakthrough British / Irish Filmmaker	Emma Donoghue	Nominated	
Mill Valley Film Festival	October 18, 2015	MVFF Overall Audience Favorite	Lenny Abrahamson	Won	
MTV Movie Awards	April 10, 2016	Best Breakthrough Performance	Brie Larson	Nominated	
National Board of Review	December 1, 2015	Best Actress	Brie Larson	Won	
National Board of Review	December 1, 2015	Top Ten Films	Room	Won	
National Board of Review	December 1, 2015	Breakthrough Performance	Jacob Tremblay	Won (Note: Shared with Abraham Attah for Beasts of No Nation)	
New Orleans Film Festival	October 28, 2015	Spotlight Film	Lenny Abrahamson	Won	
New York Film Critics Online	December 6, 2015	Best Actress	Brie Larson	Won	
Online Film Critics Society	December 13, 2015	Best Picture	Room	Nominated	
Online Film Critics Society	December 13, 2015	Best Actress	Brie Larson	Nominated	
Online Film Critics Society	December 13, 2015	Best Adapted Screenplay	Emma Donoghue	Nominated	
San Diego Film Critics Society	December 14, 2015	Best Picture	Room	Nominated	
San Diego Film Critics Society	December 14, 2015	Best Director	Lenny Abrahamson	Nominated	
San Diego Film Critics Society	December 14, 2015	Best Actor	Jacob Tremblay	Nominated	
San Diego Film Critics Society	December 14, 2015	Best Actress	Brie Larson	Won	
San Diego Film Critics Society	December 14, 2015	Best Breakthrough Performance	Jacob Tremblay	Won	
San Diego Film Critics Society	December 14, 2015	Best Adapted Screenplay	Emma Donoghue	Won	
San Diego Film Critics Society	December 14, 2015	Best Editing	Nathan Nugent	Nominated	
San Francisco Film Critics Circle	December 13, 2015	Best Actress	Brie Larson	Nominated	
San Francisco Film Critics Circle	December 13, 2015	Best Adapted Screenplay	Emma Donoghue	Nominated	
Satellite Awards	February 21, 2016	Best Motion Picture	Room	Nominated	
Satellite Awards	February 21, 2016	Best Director	Lenny Abrahamson	Nominated	
Satellite Awards	February 21, 2016	Best Actress in a Motion Picture	Brie Larson	Nominated	
Satellite Awards	February 21, 2016	Best Adapted Screenplay	Emma Donoghue	Nominated	
Saturn Award	June 22, 2016	Best Performance by a Younger Actor	Jacob Tremblay	Nominated	
Saturn Award	June 22, 2016	Best Independent Film	Room	Won	
Screen Actors Guild Awards	January 30, 2016	Outstanding Performance by a Female Actor in a Leading Role	Brie Larson	Won	
Screen Actors Guild Awards	January 30, 2016	Outstanding Performance by a Male Actor in a Supporting Role	Jacob Tremblay	Nominated	
St. Louis Film Critics Association	December 21, 2015	Best Film	Room	Nominated	
St. Louis Film Critics Association	December 21, 2015	Best Actress	Brie Larson	Won	
St. Louis Film Critics Association	December 21, 2015	Best Scene	"Jack's escape and rescue"	Nominated	
Teen Choice Awards	July 31, 2016	Choice Movie Actress: Drama	Brie Larson	Nominated	
Teen Choice Awards	July 31, 2016	Choice Movie Actor: Drama	Jacob Tremblay	Nominated	
Toronto Film Critics Association	December 14, 2015	Best Actress	Brie Larson	Runner-up	
Toronto International Film Festival	September 20, 2015	People's Choice Award	Room	Won	
Vancouver Film Critics Circle	December 21, 2015	Best International Actress	Brie Larson	Won	
Vancouver Film Critics Circle	December 21, 2015	Best International Screenplay	Emma Donoghue	Nominated	
Vancouver Film Critics Circle	January 6, 2016	Best Canadian Film	Room	Won	
Vancouver Film Critics Circle	January 6, 2016	Best Actor in a Canadian Film	Jacob Tremblay	Won	
Vancouver Film Critics Circle	January 6, 2016	Best Actress in a Canadian Film	Brie Larson	Won	
Vancouver Film Critics Circle	January 6, 2016	Best Supporting Actress in a Canadian Film	Joan Allen	Nominated	
Vancouver Film Critics Circle	January 6, 2016	Best Screenplay for a Canadian Film	Emma Donoghue	Won	
Vancouver Film Critics Circle	January 6, 2016	Best Director of a Canadian Film	Lenny Abrahamson	Nominated	
Vancouver International Film Festival	October 12, 2015	Most Popular Canadian Feature Film Award	Room	Won	
Warsaw International Film Festival	October 16, 2015	Audience Award	Room	Won	
Washington D.C. Area Film Critics Association	December 7, 2015	Best Actress	Brie Larson	Nominated	
Washington D.C. Area Film Critics Association	December 7, 2015	Best Youth Performance	Jacob Tremblay	Won	
Washington D.C. Area Film Critics Association	December 7, 2015	Best Adapted Screenplay	Emma Donoghue	Won	
Women Film Critics Circle	December 17, 2015	Best Woman Storyteller	Emma Donoghue	Nominated	
Women Film Critics Circle	December 17, 2015	Best Young Actress	Brie Larson	Won	
Women Film Critics Circle	December 17, 2015	Best Screen Couple	Brie Larson, and Jacob Tremblay	Won (Note: Shared with Charlotte Rampling, and Tom Courtenay for 45 Years)	
Women Film Critics Circle	December 17, 2015	Courage in Acting	Brie Larson	Nominated	

== See also ==
- 2015 in film
