= Sid Armour =

Canadian make-up artist

- Occupation: Make-up artist
- Awards: Canadian Screen Award for Best Makeup

Sid Armour is a Canadian make-up artist. She is known for her work on the television film The Road to Christmas in 2006 and the films Diary of the Dead (2007) and Room (2015).

She won the Canadian Screen Award for Best Makeup for Room in 2016. While some of the Canadian Screen Award-winners for the film were not Canadian, Armour was noted along with Jacob Tremblay, Ethan Tobman and Mary Kirkland as among the film's Canadian award recipients. Afterwards, she joined the make-up crew for the 2016 Canadian film The Other Half.
