= Dallas–Fort Worth Film Critics Association Awards 2015 =

Annual US film awards ceremony

21st Dallas–Fort Worth Film Critics Association Awards
- Date: December 14, 2015
- Location: Dallas, Texas
- Country: United States
- Presented by: Dallas–Fort Worth Film Critics Association
- Website: dfwcritics.com

The 21st Dallas–Fort Worth Film Critics Association Awards honoring the best in film for 2015 were announced on December 14, 2015. These awards "recognizing extraordinary accomplishment in film" are presented annually by the Dallas–Fort Worth Film Critics Association (DFWFCA), based in the Dallas–Fort Worth metroplex region of Texas. The organization, founded in 1990, includes 30 film critics for print, radio, television, and internet publications based in north Texas. The Dallas–Fort Worth Film Critics Association began presenting its annual awards list in 1993.

The Revenant was the DFWFCA's most awarded film of 2015, taking three top honors: Best Actor (Leonardo DiCaprio), Best Director (Alejandro G. Iñárritu), and Best Cinematography (Emmanuel Lubezki). The journalistic tale, Spotlight, won Best Picture and Best Screenplay (Tom McCarthy and Josh Singer).

== Winners ==
Winners are listed first and highlighted with boldface. Other films ranked by the annual poll are listed in order. While most categories saw 5 honorees named, categories ranged from as many as 10 (Best Film) to as few as 2 (Best Cinematography, Best Animated Film, Best Screenplay, and Best Musical Score).

=== Category awards ===
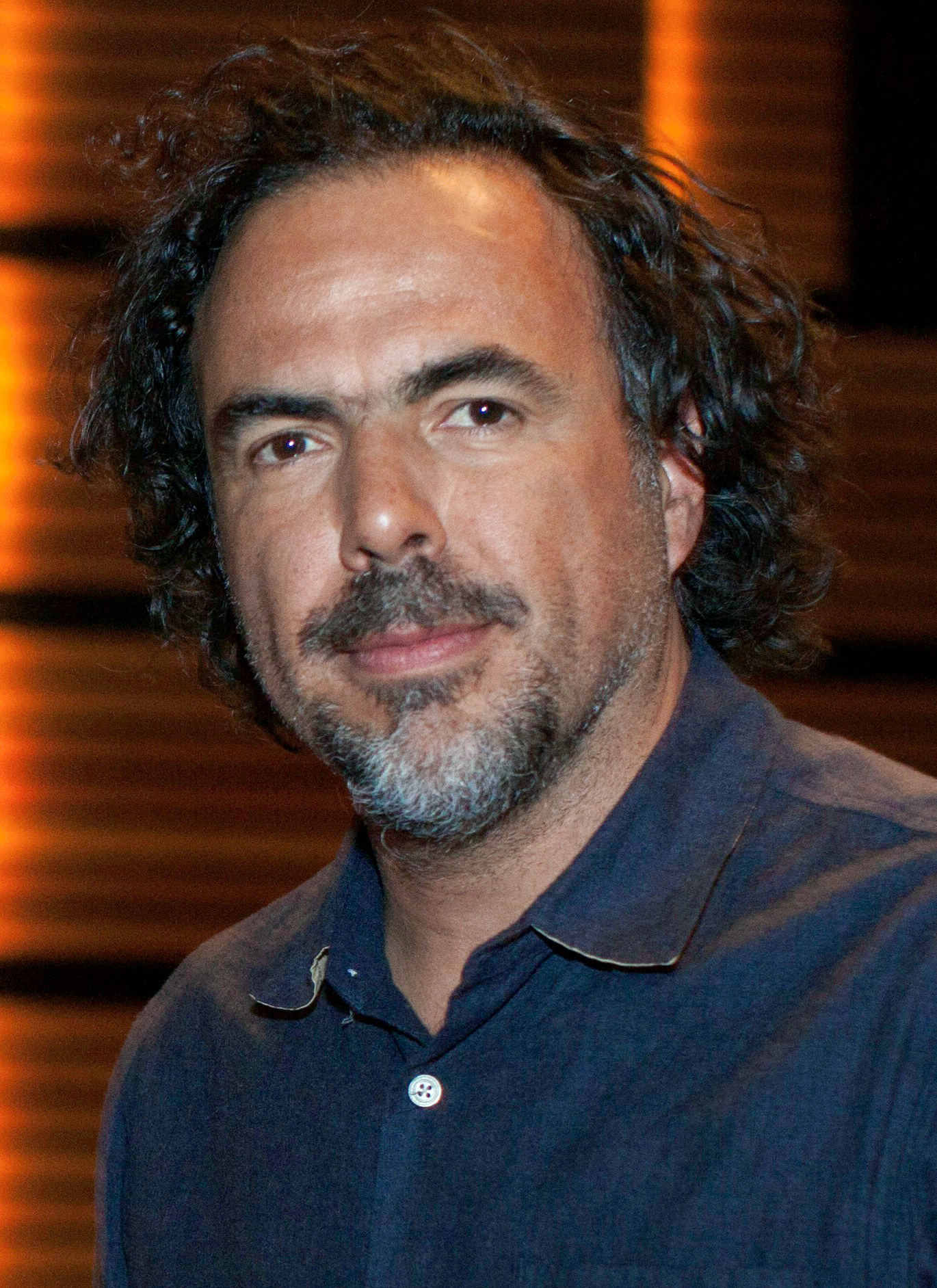
Alejandro G. Iñárritu, Best Director winner

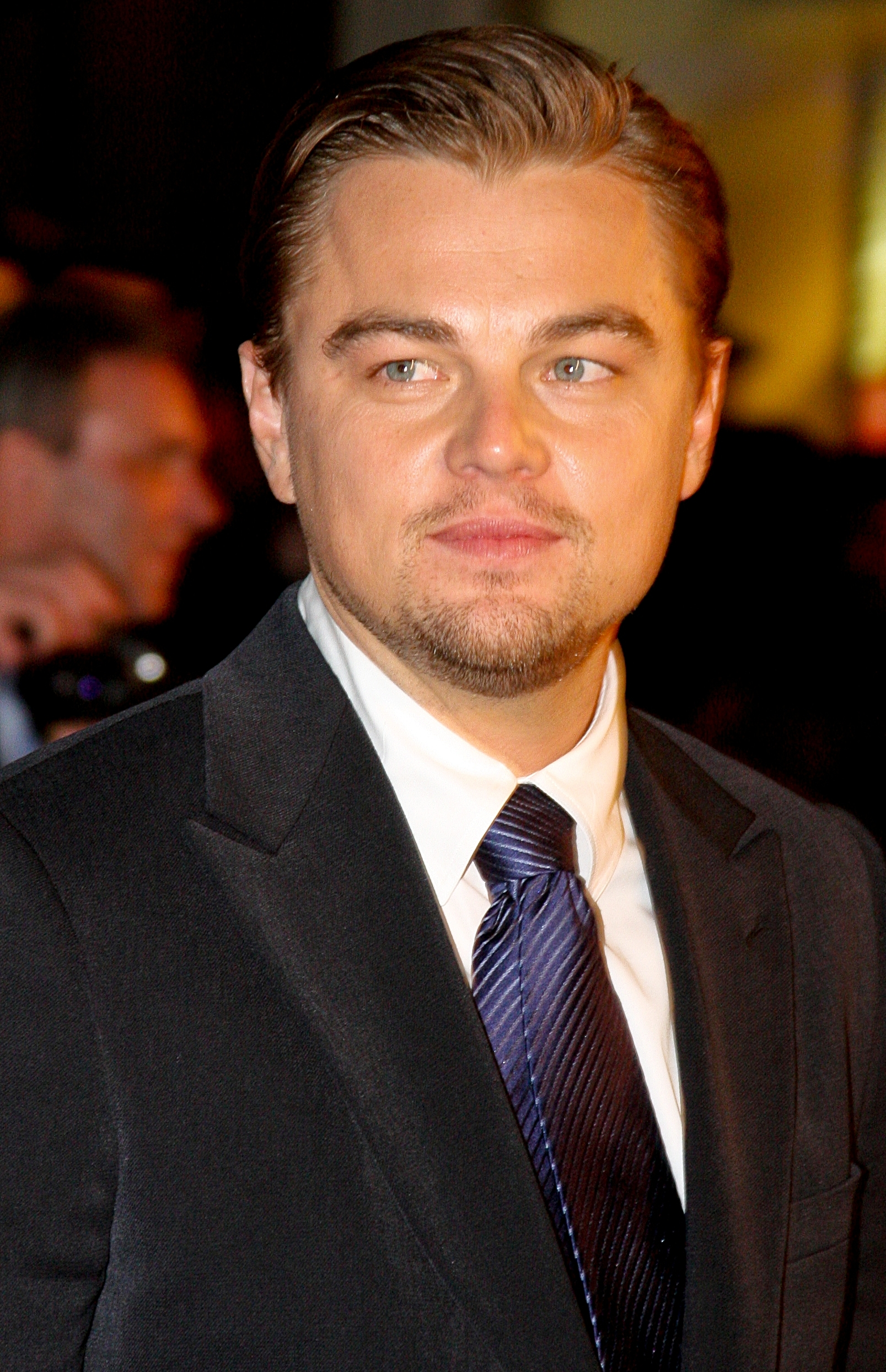
Leonardo DiCaprio, Best Actor winner

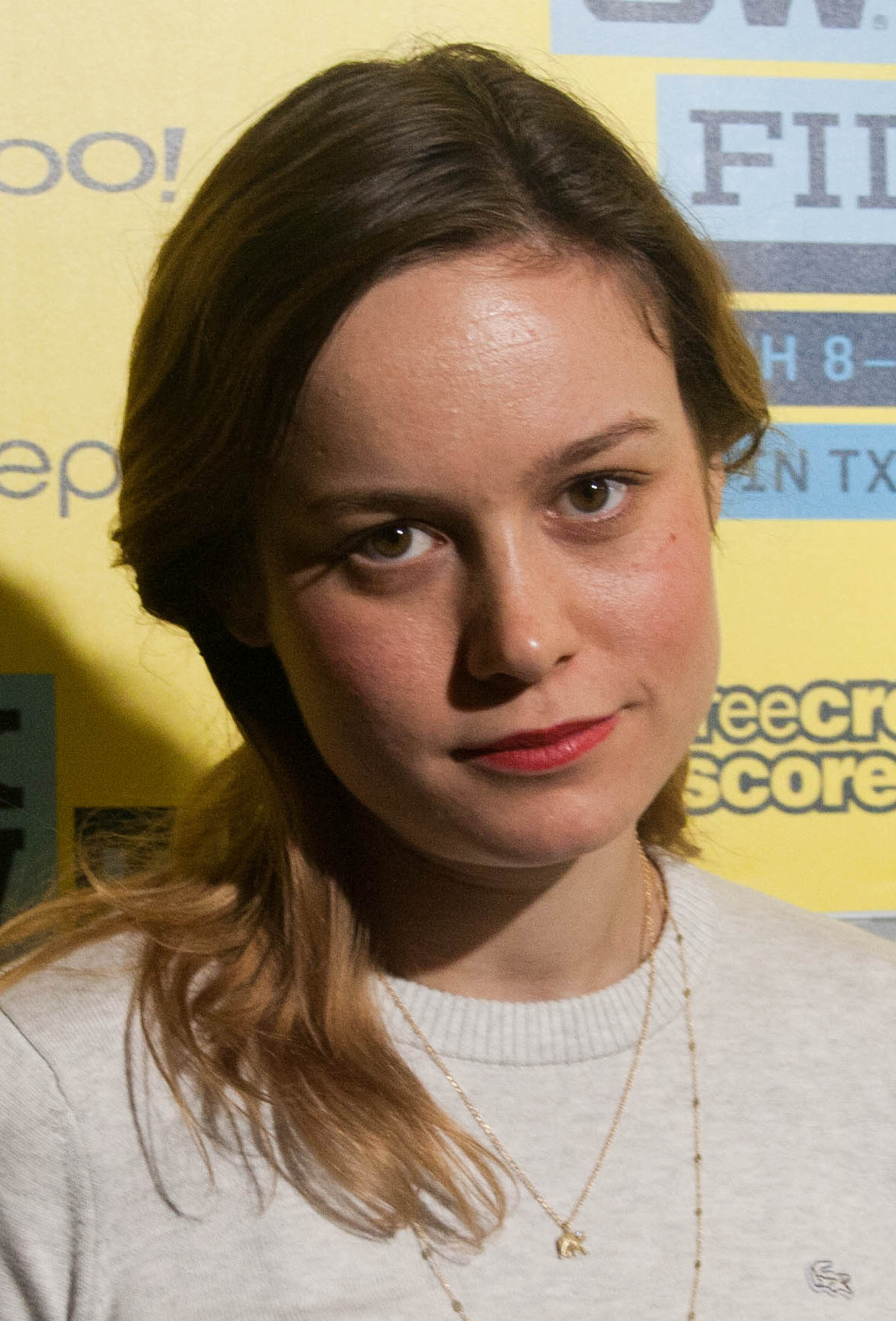
Brie Larson, Best Actress winner

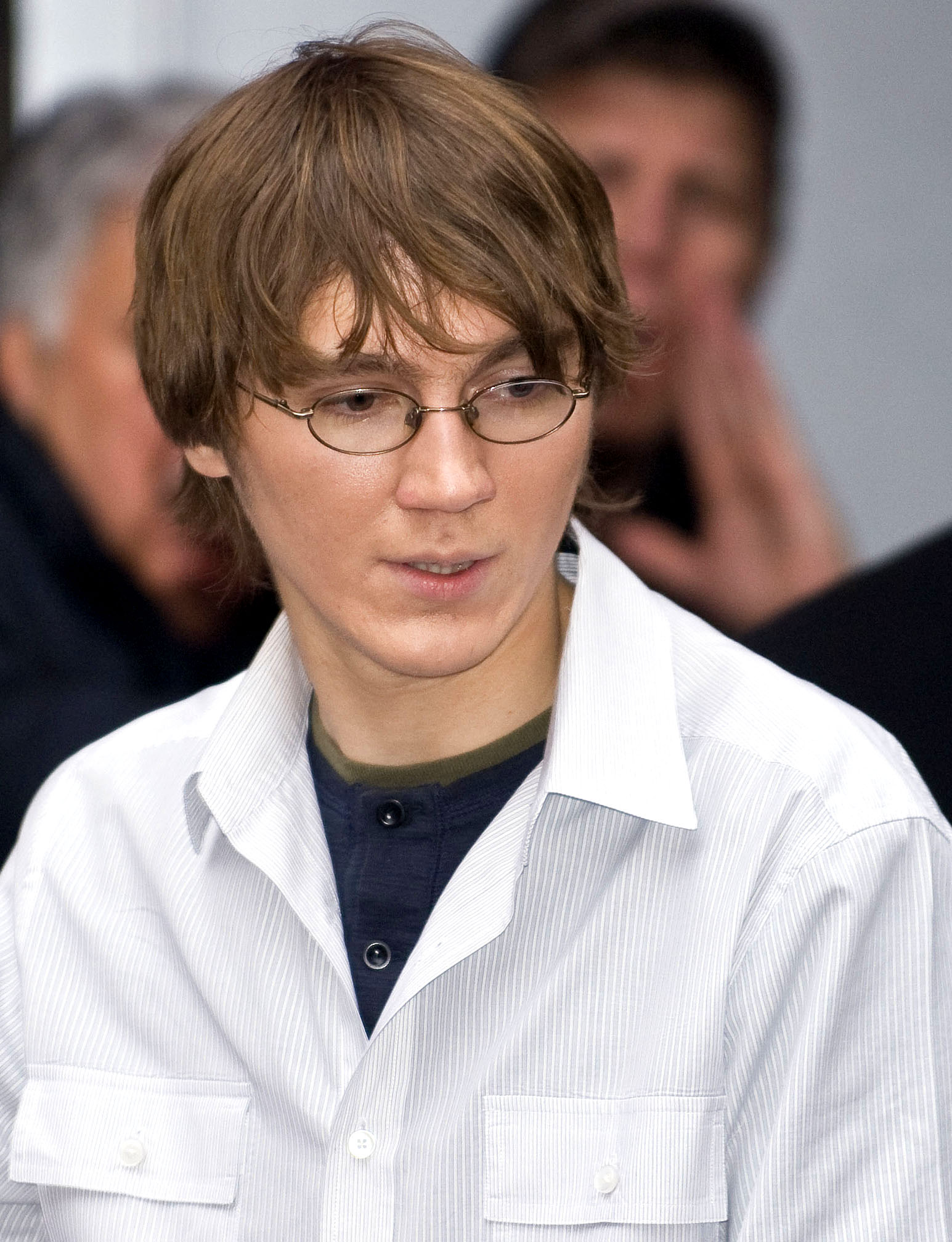
Paul Dano, Best Supporting Actor winner

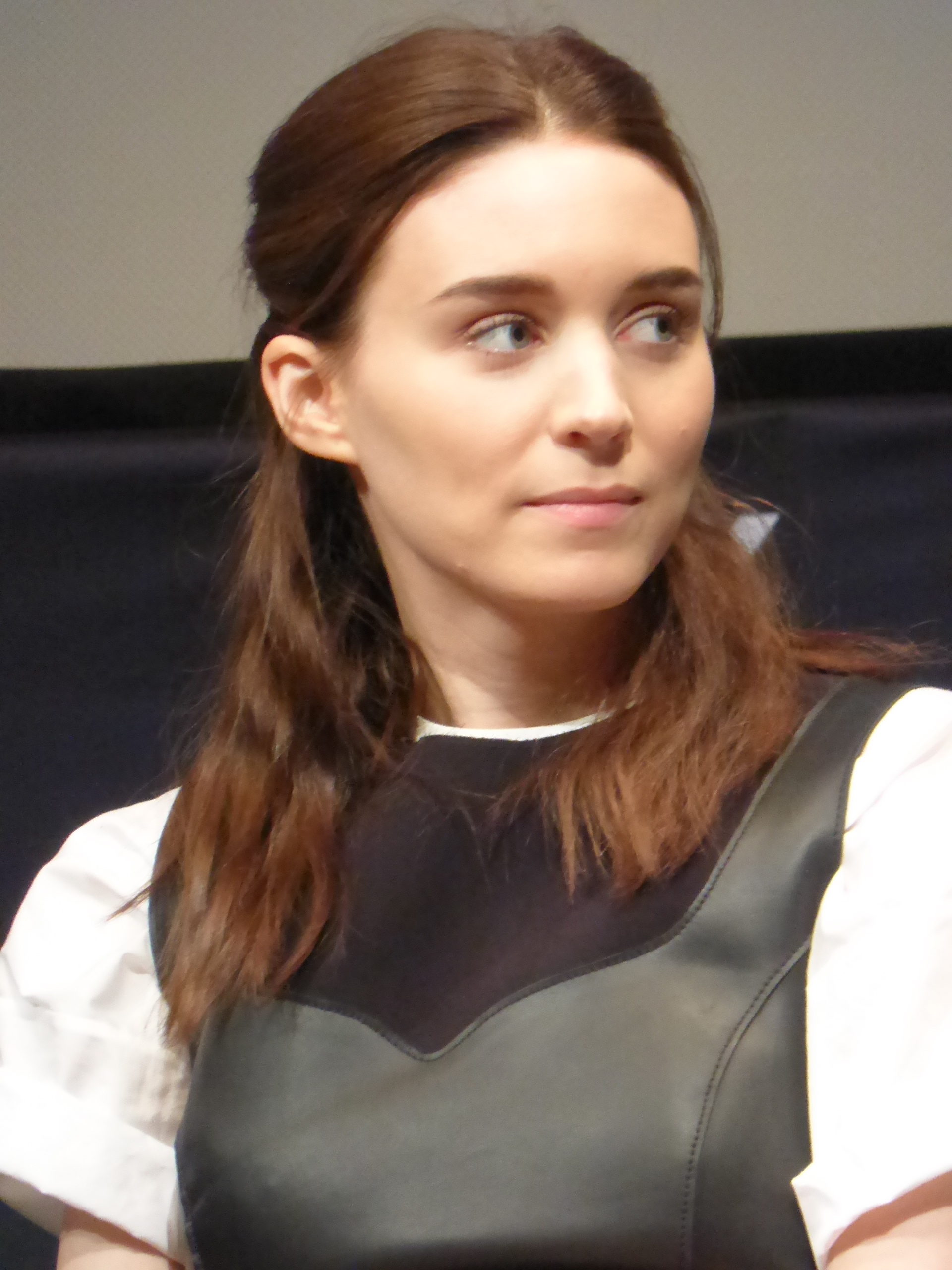
Rooney Mara, Best Supporting Actress winner

Best Picture	Best Foreign Language Film
1. **Spotlight**; 2. The Revenant; 3. Carol; 4. Sicario; 5. Mad Max: Fury Road; 6. The Big Short; 7. The Martian; 8. Room; 9. The Danish Girl; 10. Brooklyn	1. **Son of Saul** • Hungary; 2. The Assassin • Taiwan; 3. The Second Mother • Brazil; 4. Mustang • France; 5. Goodnight Mommy • Austria
Best Actor	Best Actress
1. **Leonardo DiCaprio** - The Revenant as Hugh Glass; 2. Michael Fassbender - Steve Jobs as Steve Jobs; 3. Eddie Redmayne - The Danish Girl as Lili Elbe / Einar Wegener; 4. Matt Damon - The Martian as Mark Watney; 5. Johnny Depp - Black Mass as James "Whitey" Bulger	1. **Brie Larson** - Room as Joy "Ma" Newsome; 2. Cate Blanchett - Carol as Carol Aird; 3. Saoirse Ronan - Brooklyn as Eilis Lacey; 4. Charlotte Rampling - 45 Years as Kate Mercer; 5. Carey Mulligan - Surragette as Maude Watts **(TIE)** Charlize Theron - Mad Max: Fury Road as Imperator Furiosa **(TIE)**
Best Supporting Actor	Best Supporting Actress
1. **Paul Dano** - Love & Mercy as Brian Wilson (Young); 2. Mark Rylance - Bridge of Spies as Rudolf Abel; 3. Tom Hardy - The Revenant as John Fitzgerald; 4. Idris Elba - Beasts of No Nation as Commandant; 5. Benicio del Toro - Sicario as Alejandro Gillick	1. **Rooney Mara** - Carol as Therese Belivet; 2. Alicia Vikander - Ex Machina as Ava; 3. Kate Winslet - Steve Jobs as Joanna Hoffman; 4. Alicia Vikander - The Danish Girl as Gerda Wegener; 5. Jennifer Jason Leigh - The Hateful Eight as Daisy Domergue
Best Director	Best Documentary Film
1. **Alejandro G. Iñárritu** - The Revenant; 2. Tom McCarthy - Spotlight; 3. George Miller - Mad Max: Fury Road; 4. Todd Haynes - Carol; 5. Denis Villeneuve - Sicario	1. **Amy**; 2. The Look of Silence; 3. The Wolfpack; 4. Going Clear: Scientology and the Prison of Belief; 5. The Hunting Ground
Best Animated Film	Best Cinematography
1. **Inside Out**; 2. Anomalisa	1. **Emmanuel Lubezki** - The Revenant; 2. Edward Lachman - Carol
Best Screenplay	Best Musical Score
1. **Tom McCarthy and Josh Singer** - Spotlight; 2. Emma Donoghue - Room	1. **Bryce Dessner, Ryuichi Sakamoto, and Alva Noto** - The Revenant; 2. Ennio Morricone - The Hateful Eight

=== Individual awards ===
==== Russell Smith Award ====
- Tangerine, for "best low-budget or cutting-edge independent film"
