= Inseparable =

Inseparable may refer to:

== Mathematics ==
- Inseparable differential equation, an ordinary differential equation that cannot be solved by using separation of variables
- Inseparable extension, a field extension by elements that do not all satisfy a separable polynomial
- Inseparable polynomial, a polynomial that does not have distinct roots in a splitting field

== Music ==
- Inseparable (album), by Natalie Cole, 1975
  - "Inseparable" (song), the title song
- Inseparable (EP), by Veridia, 2014
- "Inseparables" (song), by Yahritza y su Esencia and Iván Cornejo, 2022
- Les inséparables, an album by Corneille, 2011
- "Inseperable", a song by Jonas Brothers from Jonas Brothers, 2007
- "Inseperable", a song by Mariah Carey from Memoirs of an Imperfect Angel, 2009

== Other uses ==
- Inseparable (Donoghue book), a 2010 non-fiction book by Emma Donoghue
- Inseparable (Griffin and Griffin book), a 2019 sports autobiography by Shaquem Griffin and Shaquill Griffin with Mark Schlabach
- Inseparable (film), a 2011 Chinese film by Dayyan Eng
- The Inseparables, a 1929 British film by Adelqui Migliar and John Stafford
- Inseparability, in marketing, a quality of services as distinct from goods
