= Passions Between Women =

1993 book by Emma Donoghue

- Author: Emma Donoghue
- Publication date: 1993

Passions Between Women: British Lesbian Culture 1668-1801 is a scholarly monograph by Emma Donoghue, which collects written descriptions of lesbian relationships in early modern Britain. It was first published in the UK 1993 by Scarlet Press, and reprinted in the US in 1996 by Harper Perennial.

The book includes material from a range of literary genres (novels, plays, poetry, histories, and biographies) as well as non-literary sources like medical writing, criminal records, newspapers, letters, and diaries. The earliest work included is The Convent of Pleasure (1668) by Margaret Cavendish, and the latest is Belinda (1801) by Maria Edgeworth. Other examples include the relationship between Queen Anne and Sarah Churchill; the "female husband" Samuel Bundy/Sarah Paul; Sophia Baddeley's relationship with Elizabeth Steele; and Queen Catharine; or, The Ruines of Love (1698) by Mary Pix. Donoghue organizes her examples into four key themes: gender blurring, friendship, sex, and community.

Donoghue's book distinguishes itself from the earlier Surpassing the Love of Men (1981) by Lillian Faderman by emphasizing the possibility for sexual relationships between women, not just the more delicate "romantic friendships" described by Faderman. The book also argues against the idea that lesbians did not conceive of a shared sexual identity, and had rarely recorded their presence in writing, before the nineteenth century.
