= Nathan Nugent =

Irish film editor

- Occupation: Film editor
- Awards: Canadian Screen Award for Best Editing; Irish Film & Television Award for Best Editing

Nathan Nugent is an Irish film editor known for working with director Lenny Abrahamson.

For Abrahamson, Nugent edited What Richard Did (2012), Frank (2014), and Room (2015). At the 10th Irish Film & Television Awards in 2013, Nugent won Best Editing for What Richard Did.

While working on Frank, Nugent told Abrahamson he would be interested in editing Room based on having read the novel of the same name. Nugent also served as second-unit director. He described his editing of Room as simplistic, keeping the acting intact, while working in Dublin for five months. However, child actor Jacob Tremblay's part was filmed in numerous takes so Tremblay could give variations of his performances of specific lines, so Abrahamson and Nugent had to assemble and splice the different takes in the editing process.

For Room, a Canadian co-production, Nugent won the Canadian Screen Award for Best Editing in March 2016. In April, he won the Irish Film & Television Award for Best Editing.
