= The Wonder (novel) =

2016 novel by Emma Donoghue

- Author: Emma Donoghue
- Language: English
- Genre: Novel
- Publisher: Little, Brown and Company
- Publication date: 2016

The Wonder is a 2016 novel by Irish-Canadian novelist Emma Donoghue.

Set in post-famine Ireland, the novel follows English nurse Elizabeth Wright as she cares for a supposed miraculous girl, who has survived without sustenance for four months.

The novel received positive reviews upon release and was nominated for the 2016 Giller Prize. It was also adapted into a 2022 film of the same name directed by Sebastián Lelio.

== Summary ==
In the 1850s, Lib Wright, an English nurse trained by Florence Nightingale in the Crimean War, accepts a mysterious job in Ireland. Lib comes to realize that she and a nun have been hired to watch over an 11-year-old child, Anna O'Donnell, who stopped eating on her 11th birthday four months ago. Lib immediately assumes the child is a trickster, but is shocked by her deep faith and her insistence that she is existing on manna from Heaven.

Lib is unable to determine how Anna has been surviving, and slowly comes to believe she is not intentionally seeking fame or fortune. Lib befriends a journalist, William Byrne, who is writing a story on Anna and, no longer trusting her own judgement, introduces Byrne to Anna. She is shocked when Byrne, who has some experience with starvation because of his coverage of the Irish famine, informs Lib that Anna is dying.

From their discussions, Lib comes to realize that the manna Anna spoke of was chewed-up food, fed to her through her mouth by her mother in the evening and the morning under the guise of a kiss. However, since Lib's arrival, Anna has been refusing even this sustenance. Anna begins to quickly decline.

Lib comes to believe that the watch, set up by the local doctor, priest, and other local authorities, has only succeeded in starving Anna, and tries to persuade them to move to save her. However, they claim to have done everything possible for Anna.

Lib is shocked that her warning to Anna that she might die does not seem to disturb her. She realizes that Anna hopes to die in order to reunite with her older brother, Patrick, who had been molesting her for years, and whom Anna believes is now in Hell. Lib tries to warn Anna's mother and priest, but discovers both of these knew about the molestation, but blamed Anna for it.

In a final bid to save Anna, Lib offers her milk, telling her that it will kill Anna and allow her to be reborn as Nan, an eight-year-old girl absolved of sin. Anna consents to this death and drinks the milk. Lib then passes Anna, from now on known as Nan, on to William, who is waiting to take her away, and sets the O'Donnell home on fire, claiming that she accidentally set the house on fire in a panic after Anna died.

Lib goes to speak to the board who hired her about the accident, in order to tell them her version of events. Before she does, the nun she worked with tells Lib about a "vision" she had of William spiriting Anna away on a horse. When Lib reassures her Anna is in a better place, she resolves to say nothing and Lib's plot is not uncovered.

Sometime later, on a boat to Australia, William and Nan, posing as a widower and his daughter, meet up with Lib, posing as a widow, and plan to form a new family.

== Reception ==
The novel was widely praised upon its release. The Guardian called it "a thrilling domestic psychodrama".

NPR called it one of many "mediocre suspense novels about children in pain."
