= The Pull of the Stars =

2020 novel by Emma Donoghue

The Pull of The Stars
- First Edition (UK)
- Author: Emma Donoghue
- Language: English
- Genre: Historical Fiction
- Set in: Dublin, 1918
- Publication date: July 21, 2020
- ISBN: 9781529046151

The Pull of the Stars is a 2020 novel by Irish novelist Emma Donoghue first published by Little, Brown and by Picador in the UK. The novel was written in 2018–2019, and published earlier than originally planned because it was set in the 1918 influenza pandemic in Dublin, Ireland. All the characters were fictional except Dr Kathleen Lynn. The novel was longlisted for the Giller Prize in 2020.
