= Mary Kirkland =

Canadian set decorator

- Occupation: Set decorator
- Awards: Canadian Screen Award for Best Achievement in Art Direction/Production Design

Mary Kirkland is a Canadian set decorator. She has worked in both film and television.

Among her television work was Little Mosque on the Prairie. In 2014, she was nominated with Rupert Lazarus and Sean Breaugh for the Canadian Screen Award for Best Production Design or Art Direction in a Fiction Program or Series for Satisfaction.

In 2015, she served as set director for the Canadian-Irish film Room, and The VVitch. For Room, she and Ethan Tobman won the Canadian Screen Award for Best Achievement in Art Direction/Production Design. While some of the Canadian Screen Award-winners for Room were not Canadian, Kirkland was noted along with Jacob Tremblay, Tobman and Sid Armour as among the film's Canadian award recipients.
