= Kissing the Witch =

1997 collection of short stories by Emma Donoghue

Kissing the Witch: Old Tales in New Skins
- Author: Emma Donoghue
- Cover artist: Christine Kettner
- Language: English
- Genre: folklore, short story collection
- Publisher: Hamish Hamilton Ltd. (UK); HarperCollins Publishers Inc. (US)
- Publication date: February 27, 1999 (US Paperback)
- Publication place: United Kingdom
- Media type: Print (Paperback)
- Pages: 240
- ISBN: 0064407721 (ISBN 978-0064407724)

Kissing the Witch (or Kissing the Witch: Old Tales in New Skins) is a collection of interconnected fictional short stories written by Irish-Canadian Emma Donoghue. Each of the thirteen stories in the collection is an adaptation of a well-known European fairy tale, with several tales featuring feminist and queer themes. The stories are linked together by a narrative structure where the narrator of the previous story becomes the listener of the story that follows. None of the narrators or characters are named, instead being referred to via epithets and aliases. The book, originally published in 1997 by Hamish Hamilton Ltd., was Donoghue's third published fiction novel and first short story collection. Following its release, Kissing the Witch was translated into Dutch (1997), Catalan (2000), and Italian (2007).

The US paperback collection released in 1999 by HarperCollins Publishers Inc. features a cover designed by Christine Kettner. The cover features a simple black and white inverted design and a photograph by Eric Dinyer of a young woman with dark hair looking away from the camera. The publication features a short "Acknowledgments" section that pays respect to Emma Donoghue's agent and others who inspired her to complete the collection.

== Story summaries ==
=== The Tale of the Shoe ===
(Based on "Cinderella")

Emma Donoghue opens the collection with the story of a young woman who is grieving the loss of her mother. Unlike the fairytale this section is based on, the Cinderella-like character does not have a father who remarries and brings home a wicked stepmother and evil sisters. In this retelling, the narrator's own mind is the torturous force that drives her to completing monotonous tasks and berates her whenever she does not. One day, a woman who claims to be an old friend of the narrator's mother appears at her door and pulls her out of her despair with laughter and magic. The woman—presumably some kind of witch—lavishes the narrator with beautiful dresses and, when the narrator asks to attend a ball, the woman readily fulfills her wish. The narrator attends the ball three nights in a row, each time surprised by how easy it is to speak to the nobles and even the king and prince. At the end of each night, the woman asks her whether she has had enough fun, but the narrator keeps asking to go back until the night the prince proposes to her. It is during his proposal that she realizes she doesn't love him and has instead fallen in love with the witch. She runs away and back to the witch to confess her love, leaving behind both shoes so the prince will never find her.

As with every story in this collection, the tale ends with the narrator asking the woman who she was before their story took place. This is formatted as a short free verse poem, and it often offers clues to the "Happily Ever After" of the narrator.

=== The Tale of the Bird ===
(Based on "Thumbelina")

The witch from the previous tale becomes the narrator of "The Tale of the Bird." Instead of being small in stature like the original Thumbelina, she is metaphorically small and she feels insignificant in the eyes of those around her. One of her few joys in life is sitting amongst the grass and the little creatures that call it home. While out enjoying nature, she meets a man with whom she falls in love. He ends up asking her father for her hand, and the two are quickly married. They consummate their marriage, and the two live in wedded bliss for some time as the narrator adjusts to her new life of wealth and managing the estate. The happiness comes to an end when she discovers she is pregnant and her husband begins to bar her from leaving the house. As time goes on, it becomes clear to the narrator that her hopes for the marriage are much different from those of her husband, who seems to have married her to produce children. Later in her pregnancy, she finds an injured bird in their home and nurses it back to health. Once the bird has fully recovered, the narrator releases it, as she promises that she, too, will one day be free from her marital cage.

When the bird circles back to her, she asks it who it was before it was a bird.

=== The Tale of the Rose ===
(Based on "Beauty and the Beast")

Before the bird was a bird, it was a beautiful woman with a merchant father and two vain sisters. In this way, "The Tale of the Rose" closely follows the original fairytale of Beauty and the Beast: her father's ships are lost at sea, the family fortune is lost, and she and her sisters move to a cottage in the countryside with their father. When her father returns to the city after learning one of his ships survived, the narrator's sisters ask for fancy dresses and fur boots for the winter, and the narrator asks for a freshly bloomed rose. The father returns months later, during a harsh winter storm, shaking with nothing but the rose in his hand as the narrator runs to meet him. He explains that he traded the narrator's freedom for the rose, gold, and his life after upsetting a Beast in a nearby castle. The narrator agrees to go to the castle, and she is surprised to find a room with her name on it, endless books for her to read, and a strangely courteous Beast. Despite the Beast's gentle nature, she cannot see the Beast as anything more than a monster. When she learns from a magic mirror that her father is ill, she tells the Beast she is going to go back home to tend to him but she promises to return after eight days. As she leaves, the Beast tells her it is not a man, and the narrator assumes this means the Beast is some other kind of creature, but she leaves before learning the truth. Later, when her father has recovered and she has forgotten her promise to return, she sees a vision of the Beast dying and she hastily returns to the castle. There, she finds the Beast close to freezing but still alive, and she attempts to save it by taking off the mask it wears. This reveals that the Beast is actually a beautiful woman with dark hair, pale skin, and red lips. The Beast explains that she originally donned the mask to scare off undesirable suitors and setting the particularly plucky ones with impossible riddles.

As they sit together, the narrator asks the Beast who she was before she wore the mask and drove away all her suitors.

=== The Tale of the Apple ===
(Based on "Snow White")

The Beast becomes the narrator and takes us back to the beginning of her tale, when her sickly mother was pregnant with her. Like the original tale of Snow White, her mother shares a quasi-prophecy of a child born with ebony hair, snow white skin, and blood red lips. The narrator is born with all these qualities, but her mother dies soon after her birth and she is instead raised by her maid. While she is not close to her father, the narrator tells us he makes a point of always making sure she is the first to receive an apple from the castle's orchard, signifying her importance to him above all else. When the narrator has her first period, her father gets remarried to a woman not much older than herself. While the two originally get along, her father's treatment of her new stepmother begins to drive a wedge between them. Her stepmother grows weaker as her father prioritizes producing a male heir before her health, but in the end he becomes ill and dies before an heir is born. Realizing her position as queen is in jeopardy, the stepmother demands that the narrator declare her queen, but the narrator refuses. The stepmother threatens to have her killed if she refuses again, but the narrator escapes the castle before the stepmother can fulfill any of these threats.

The narrator does not make it far in the forest by herself, but she is saved by a group of woodsmen. She settles in with these men in a cabin in the forest and achieves a certain level of domesticity as she cooks and cleans for them. Eventually, her stepmother appears at the cabin and asks to be let in. Though the narrator refuses at first, she eventually lets her stepmother in and they spend some time together. When she leaves, the narrator is left in an unexplained stupor that the woodsmen blame on a curse left by the stepmother. It leaves her unable or unwilling to cook or clean for the woodsmen for a period of time. Just as she has recovered from this, her step mother returns. The same stupor follows, and the woodsmen tell the narrator not to let the stepmother in again if she returns. However, the narrator doesn't listen. During the step mother's final visit, she brings a half-ripe apple. She takes a bite of the green side and offers the red half to the narrator who readily takes it. The narrator chokes on the first bite and faints. When she awakes, she finds herself in a coffin being carried by the woodsmen. They are surprised to see her alive, but they tell her to continue to rest in the coffin and they will carry her to a different kingdom where she will be safe from her stepmother. She realizes that the apple was not poisoned, tells the woodsmen to put her down, and turns to walk back toward the castle where her stepmother awaits.

The stanza that follows the story seems to imply that she has returned safely, as she and her stepmother are walking through the apple orchard when she asks her stepmother about who she was before marrying the king.

=== The Tale of the Handkerchief ===
(Based on "The Goose Girl")

In this tale, the stepmother explains why she was ready to kill the narrator of the previous tale to keep her place as the queen. Now the narrator, the stepmother reveals that she was not born into nobility or royalty. Instead, she was the daughter of a queen's servant. This queen had a daughter who was opposite to the narrator in every way—joyful and fair—but the two were born in the same month and year. Eventually, the narrator became the princess' servant, and she was sent away with the princess when the queen arranged for the princess to be married to a distant prince. The queen sends the princess off with her prized white horse and a handkerchief stained with her blood. Along the journey, the narrator becomes disillusioned with her role as a maid and begins to disobey the princess' requests. This culminates in her demanding the princess strip, and she swaps clothes and threatens the princess into silence as she takes on the role of princess. The horse is the only one who protests.

When they reach the kingdom, the narrator insists that the princess be tasked with taking care of the geese on the castle grounds as to keep her away from the prince and in a position where she would be unable to tell anyone the truth about the narrator. For some time, this is enough, but the narrator soon becomes paranoid that the horse's refusal to cooperate with her will give her away. She lies to the prince, telling him that the horse hurt her, and the prince has the creature killed. The head of the horse is placed on the arch of the castle gates and left to rot. The paranoia builds further as the wedding date approaches, and the narrator fears that the queen will attend and discover what she has done. However, word comes of the queen's death in battle, and the narrator must pretend to grieve even as she feels relief. The relief does not last long, though, because she is convinced the princess is going to reveal her true identity during the wedding. When she goes to confront the princess about this—driven to near madness by guilt and asking her to end the charade sooner rather than later—the princess refuses. She tells the narrator that she has found peace in her new life—something she never had before as she never felt comfortable in her role as the princess and the narrator seems to fit the title with an ease and grace she never had. The narrator marries the prince with a new sense of relief and closure, but during their reception he coughs up blood and she realizes that her position as queen will not last long.

During a walk under the castle gate's arch, the narrator asks the decaying horse's head who it was before it was the queen's horse.

=== The Tale of the Hair ===
(Based on "Rapunzel")

In another life, the horse was a young blind woman living with another woman in a hut in the forest. Though the woman the narrator lives with never tells the same story about how she found the narrator, this does not seem to bother either of them, though it does leave a sense of distance between them. The narrator does not remember their life before coming to the cabin, but there is an implication that she was able to see once as she remembers certain things that the woman never told her about—babies, what a spinning wheel looks like, etc. When she asks the woman—a huntress who continually provides for the narrator—to build a tower to keep her safe from the wolves and men outside, the huntress agrees. Later, fearing that the wolves and hunters can still get in through the windows on lower floors, the narrator asks her to close up all the windows except for the topmost one. Though she is confused by the request, the huntress agrees.

Over time, the narrator's hair grows so long she can turn it into a woven rope. She begins to daydream and sing about a prince appearing to whisk her away. This bothers the huntress, though the narrator is not sure why. Later, when the narrator is singing by the tower's window, she hears a man's voice outside. She is too spooked by his call to answer at first, but she eventually speaks to him and hoists him into the tower. They end up kissing before the man leaves. In the morning, when the huntress asks why the narrator looks so happy, she says she may never share the reason with the huntress. This upsets the huntress, and she reveals that the "prince" who visited in the night was actually her using a lower and gruffer voice. The huntress storms out of the tower and bolts the door behind her. Fearing that the huntress locked her away never to return, the narrator cuts her long hair and fashions it into a rope so she can leave the tower. She is not gone for long before the huntress returns, realizes she is missing, and lets out an anguished cry. The narrator returns to console her only to find the huntress has injured her own eyes with thorns. The thorns are removed, but it is uncertain whether the huntress will ever see again; the narrator comforts her as they both weep and asks her who she was before she brought the narrator to the cabin in the forest.

=== The Tale of the Brother ===
(Based on "The Snow Queen")

Before she was a huntress, our new narrator was a young orphan girl who had no one aside from her brother. She loved her brother dearly, but she also wanted to take his place since he was able to sneak out of the orphanage and play with his friends. One day, she follows her brother out of the orphanage to watch him ice skate with his friends, and she witnesses him being abducted by a pale, fur-covered woman in a bell-adorned sleigh. No one believes her when she tells them about this, and her brother never returns. After some time, she decides to leave the orphanage to search for her brother. Several days pass as she braves the cold and relies on the kindness of strangers to keep her fed, but she eventually sees the pale woman in the sleigh again and latches on to the side of the vehicle in the hopes that it will take her to her brother. She is thrown off when the sleigh takes a sharp turn, and she is forced to walk the rest of the way through the snow until she reaches the end of the tracks left behind. These tracks lead her to a grand castle, and she climbs the stairs to bang on the door with her shoes. The pale woman answers with the young girl's brother passing behind her. Seeing him alive and well, the young girl cries and asks why she wasn't taken instead of her brother. The pale woman answers by opening her arms and inviting the girl in.

The transitioning stanza sees the young girl eating a meal with the pale woman and asking her who she was before she took young boys in her sleigh.

=== The Tale of the Spinster ===
(Based on "Rumpelstilskin")

The pale woman begins by sharing a glimpse into her life with her mother. When she was younger, she worked as a spinster, spinning flax and cotton into thread on her spinning wheel while her mother sat at their home's window and called to the potential customers passing by outside. The narrator was given little rest from her work, and her mother berated her for any small mistake. On her death bed, her mother tells her to never stop working because it will keep her occupied. While she listens to this advice, the narrator soon finds herself overwhelmed by orders and searches for an assistant. She finds a young woman who is not very intelligent and only asks to be given food and drink for her work. The woman is a talented spinner, and the narrator takes up her mother's old post at the window to call to customers while the woman—dubbed Little Sister by the narrator—works. When the last of the material has been spun and Little Sister claims she wants to go home, the narrator begs her to stay. This time, Little Sister asks to sleep in the narrator's bed. The narrator agrees and their situation continues. When the work is finished yet again, the narrator brings in even more to be done, but Little Sister insists that she must go home. After the narrator begs her to stay, Little Sister makes her final request: the narrator's firstborn. The narrator agrees quickly, and they fall back into their normal routine.

Not long after the deal is made, the narrator falls pregnant with a merchants child. She and Little Sister agree to conceal her bump and—since Little Sister will take the baby once it is born—tell everyone in town that Little Sister is the one who is about to give birth. When the baby is born, Little Sister takes the boy to be christened right away. The narrator hardly sees the baby, grows to dislike his constant crying, and piles up more and more flax in the house to drown out the noise. One day, she finds Little Sister sleeping at the spinning wheel while the baby drools into the flax. The narrator slaps him, and Little Sister wakes up. She says nothing to the narrator about this incident. However, when the narrator returns home shortly after this event, she finds all of the work done and Little Sister is nowhere to be found. She runs to the bridge leading out of town and finds Little Sister leaving with the baby. The narrator demands that Little Sister give back her baby, but Little Sister reminds them of their deal. Though the narrator continues to beg, Little Sister points out that the narrator never even asked what her real name was or what she had named the baby. Defeated and guilty, the narrator gives up her protests.

As Little Sister turns to leave, the narrator asks her who she is.

=== The Tale of the Cottage ===
(Based on "Hansel and Gretel")

The narrator for this section is Little Sister from "The Tale of the Spinster" and it is relayed in choppy sentences. It is unclear whether Little Sister has a developmental delay that causes this "speech" pattern or if the stylistic choice is a reflection of her lack of education as it is evident she grew up impoverished and withdrawn. In this tale, Little Sister states that she and her brother lived with their mother in a small cottage until their mother remarried a huntsman who abused her and made the children sleep in the coop with the chickens. While in the coop, Little Sister occasionally hears her mother's abuse as well as whispered and cryptic plans about how to solve the family's lack of resources. First, the huntsman leaves Little Sister alone in the woods with a piece of bread under the guise of playing a game, but her older brother finds her and brings her back to the house. Then, the huntsman leaves both she and her brother in the woods during the winter when the snow and darkness make it impossible to find their way back home. When they awake the next morning, they set out to try and find home but find a pleasant cottage made of gingerbread. Upon knocking on the door, a young woman answers and lets them inside. She tells them that they can stay in her cottage as long as they provide manual labor, and they will always be fed as the woman keeps a cage that always manages to catch rabbits.

Though they sleep in warm beds on their first night there, all other nights see the siblings sleeping on the floor in front of the oven. While Little Sister is sad, her brother is the only one who actively shows his discontent. As time passes and they grow older, the brother begins to make what appear to be sexual advances on the woman—asking for kisses, sneaking into the woman's bed, etc.—which culminates in him lifting her skirt. The woman holds a knife to his throat and locks him in the rabbit cage for this, and she tries to quiet Little Sister's distress about her brother by letting Little Sister join her in bed that night. Once the woman is asleep, Little Sister sneaks away to release her brother from the cage, but she does not follow him when he leaves the cottage and she tells him to never come back.

Later, as they are sitting together, Little Sister asks the woman who she was before she was "so angry."

=== The Tale of the Skin ===
(Based on "Donkeyskin")

Before the cottage, the woman was a princess in a far off land. At a very young age, she resembled her mother—with pale skin, blonde hair, and red lips. Her father, the king, loved her mother dearly, but he also had another love—a prized donkey. Upon her mother's death, the king is inconsolable and spends his days with the donkey lamenting her loss. Courtiers try to convince him to remarry, but he is unsatisfied with all of their suggestions because none of the women look enough like his deceased wife. One day, when the princess is older, she delivers food to her father's room. When he sees her he is immediately in awe of how much she looks like her mother and he kisses and tries to strip her. While she manages to get away, the desperate courtiers ask her to "play along" with her father's delusions until they can find a doctor capable of helping him. Devastated, she seeks the aid of a "flower woman" who gives her a plan. Later, when her father asks her to marry him, she tells him she needs a dress as gold as the sun before she can marry him. The flower woman is commissioned to make the dress and she takes her time in order to stall the wedding. This process repeats until the princess has three dresses, but doctors have yet to arrive and her father still insists on marrying her. Desperate, the princess tells him she will require the skin of his most beloved donkey before she marries him, and she believes this will finally save her as he would never kill the donkey. However, that night she is awoken by her father laying the donkey skin on her and telling her they will be married the next day.

Before the wedding can actually take place, the flower woman comes to the princess and helps her disguise her blonde hair and pale skin so she can escape the castle. The princess uses the donkey skin as a cloak and ventures into the wilderness. After many hardships, she is found in the woods by a hunting party and brought to a handsome prince who allows her to stay in the castle as long as she works in the kitchen. One night, when a ball is held, she cleans herself off and dons one of the beautiful dresses she brought with her and captivates the prince. However, when she goes back to the disguise and the donkey skin, the prince fails to see through the disguise when he comes to talk to her the next day. She leaves the kingdom and returns to her home, staying with the flower woman.

The transitioning stanza sees the princess and the flower woman laying the donkey skin on the dead king's grave as the princess asks the flower woman who she was before she learned to sew such beautiful dresses.

=== The Tale of the Needle ===
(Based on "Sleeping Beauty")

The flower woman was born to an older couple who lauded her as their perfect daughter after her birth followed years of infertility. When she was born, they placed golden mesh gloves on her hands and told all of the staff that if anyone made her cry they would be punished. While the narrator is provided almost everything she wants and never has to work, she finds herself desiring something more. Eventually, when she asks to leave the estate, her parents instead give her a kitten (despite denying her one in the past), but they end up taking it away again after it scratches the narrator. On a day when her parents are distracted, she finds her mother's keys and uses them to enter a tower on the estate she was never allowed to enter. She finds a woman sitting at a spinning wheel in the tower. The two have a conversation about how much the narrator is sheltered by her parents, and the narrator laments about how she never asked for a life free of work and pain. The woman at the wheel convinces her to use the spinning wheel. Though the narrator pricks her finger on the wheel's needle, cries out (thus alerting her parents who rush to find her), and kicks the spinning wheel, she does eventually lock herself and the woman in the room so she can sit at the wheel and continue the work.

As the woman shares her worldly knowledge with the narrator, the narrator asks her who she was before she was locked away in the tower, and thus the woman becomes the narrator of the next story.

=== The Tale of the Voice ===
(Based on "The Little Mermaid")

The woman grew up in a small fishing town where she helped her father, mother, and sisters run the family fishing business. She did not reflect much on whether or not she was happy with the dirt and grime of her life until she saw a handsome merchant's son in the village market one day. After waking up with an intense dissatisfaction with her life, she decides she must be in love, but she doesn't see herself as capable of winning the merchant son's affection. So, she goes to the "witch" who lives on the edge of town and asks for her help. While the witch tries to dissuade her, the narrator insists and ends up agreeing to give up her voice to become beautiful. The witch combs her hair and sends her on her way, and the narrator heads home to pack her things. Her family begs her not to leave, but she does not listen and ends up setting out for the city to find the man she loves. While the journey is long, she finds him quickly when she arrives and immediately catches his eyes. The merchant's son takes her as his lover and teaches her about sex as he takes her to balls and parties, and he doesn't seem to mind that she can't speak to him. As the days go on, the merchant's son never proposes to her like she hoped he would, and she eventually catches him with another woman. Feeling betrayed, the narrator leaves him and makes her journey back to the witch, spending some time as a sex worker to earn money on the way.

When she demands her voice back because she feels the witch tricked her by saying she would catch the man she wanted without including that she wouldn't keep him, the witch reveals that she never took the narrator's voice—that is wasn't hers to take—and the narrator simply needed to find it again. She also reveals that the narrator's sisters visited and gave up their hair to make the witch a shawl in exchange for the narrator's safe return. Voice restored, the narrator goes back to her family.

Later, she returns to the witch and asks about how she came to the village and who she was before the rumors about her spread.

=== The Tale of the Kiss ===
Unlike the other tales in the collection, "The Tale of the Kiss" does not draw from a particular fairy tale. Rather, the final chapter is an amalgamation of several tales and focuses on the theme of oracles and diviners.

The witch from the previous tale becomes the final narrator as she explains that she left her hometown after the death of her mother because she realized she was barren and she didn't want to face the stigma of being childless in a small village. After journeying for some time, she finds a small cave by a cliff that seems to have been occupied some time before her arrival, and she settles down there. Soon, offerings begin to show up at the mouth of the cave, and she realizes the townsfolk are leaving them as advanced payments for advice and magical solutions. She begins to talk to the people who come to her cave, though she never allows them to enter, and they seem to believe she has divination powers. Most of her "work" is simply listening to people and giving them the occasional "potion" of herbs that could help them fight off a sickness; the power is mostly an illusion fed by the superstitions of those who come to her.

One day, a mother and a father visit her—separately—and complain about their daughter. The mother claims she is worried the daughter won't stick around to take care of her in her old age, and the father is worried the daughter will never marry despite being old enough to. The witch tells them both to come back after several days for an answer to their problems as she tries to figure out how to make both of them happy without undermining the wishes of the other. During this time, the daughter wanders to her cave and the witch is taken off guard by her jovial attitude, love for all things, and want for nothing. When the parents come back, the witch lies to them and says the oracles told her their daughter was under a curse and misfortune would befall her if they tried to force their daughter to either stay with them forever or get married against her wishes. The daughter comes to the witch that night and thanks her for her parents' changed attitudes despite the daughter never asking for the witch's help, and she asks if the witch wants anything in return. The witch asks for a kiss, though she expects the daughter to refuse. She is surprised when the daughter kisses her, and she finds herself thinking about the kiss and the daughter in the days that follow, until she realizes she has fallen in love with the daughter. The narrator does not share what happens next, choosing to keep it a secret.

The tale closes without a stanza.

== Structure ==
Fictional short story collections often feature some level of connection between the parts of their whole. In Kissing the Witch, this connection is found in both the subject matter and the structure of the stories. Each tale is a retelling of a popular fairy or folktale, with some adhering more closely to the original plot than others. Between each story is a short stanza that contains some rendition of the story's narrator asking another character in their tale who they were before the events that took place. The other character then answers with a line that ends with "It is the tale of a..." with the final word indicating the next story in the series. This short verse is a message to the reader that the unnamed character of the tale is stepping into the role of the narrator, with the narrator of the previous tale acting as a pseudo-audience, much like the readers themselves.

The structure of how these short stories are connected has been a subject of discussion and debate amongst several scholars. Jennifer Orme is one such scholar, who—in her article "Mouth to Mouth: Queer Desires in Emma Donoghue's Kissing the Witch"—wrote, "These interstitial moments work as an internal structural-framing device that provides a formula for the passing on of the storytelling duty, continuity between the tales, and cohesion for the book as a whole." The inclusion of this stanza allows the first story to slip into the next, and it is one of few indications to the reader about who is speaking as none of the characters are introduced with their given name. Another scholar named Cristina Bacchilega points out that this structure changes the nature of the retold fairytale even further, as it steps away from the neatly packaged "happily ever after" that normally follows fairytales and instead leads into further growth and understanding on the side of both the narrator and the listener. The author of "The Magic Power of Telling and Re-telling in Kissing the Witch", Qiu Xiaoqing, further extends this idea by addressing the ending of "The Tale of the Kiss"—unlike the others, the final tale makes it clear in its direct address to the reader that the role of the narrator is passing beyond the story and stepping into the real world. Qiu Xiaoqing claims that this is a call to the reader to continue the story and "actively participate in story reading and interpretation."

== Themes ==
=== Feminism ===
Before the release of Kissing the Witch, Emma Donoghue regularly engaged with and produced scholarship and fiction which featured examinations of traditionally heteronormalized interpretations of historical accounts of female intimacy and sexuality. Like those who published similarly revised fairytales before her(such as Angela Carter's The Bloody Chamber), Donoghue's fluid representations of gender, gender roles, and sexuality in Kissing the Witch offers a critique of the power structures which exist in traditional fairytales and provides a sense of agency for both the narrator and the reader. A close reading of the text and how it both acknowledges the intersectional aspect of oppression and centers gender identity, sexuality, and political activism places it in line with third-wave feminist ideology. Examples of this include Donoghue's representation of relationships between women from different generations—whether those relationships be romantic, platonic, or that of a mentor and mentee. Almost every tale features a coupling of an older and younger woman, and the tale itself is a reflection of the younger woman bridging a gap of understanding left by the older woman's more solid sense of self and worldliness.

Donoghue's text also centers the voices of women both in its subject matter and the nature of how it employs its narrators, giving a platform to nameless women who may have otherwise been considered nothing more than a supporting character and therefore granting each woman a level of importance and insight that may not have been present in the original tales. Centering the female narrators also gives them a sense of agency in their own tales, one that is sometimes explicitly shown or discovered throughout the story—as is the case of "The Tale of the Skin" and "The Tale of the Voice"—where the narrators may be given help from another, older woman but ultimately find their agency on their own. In "The Tale of the Shoe", "The Tale of the Skin", and "The Tale of the Voice" this comes in the form of finding a fulfilling relationship within themselves rather than a male counterpart. In other stories—such as "The Tale of the Apple", "The Tale of the Hair", and "The Tale of the Cottage"—agency is discovered by breaking away from what was once considered home and deciding where to reside next.

=== Queer retellings ===
Emma Donoghue's collection engages with queerness in ways that stretch beyond the representation of lesbians and non-heterosexual characters in her retellings. The liminal nature of how the text passes from one narrator to the next as well as the portrayal of women choosing non-heteronormative paths for their lives (rejecting marriage or being displeased with their role as a homemaker or broodmare) also reflects an aspect of queerness. Emma Donoghue relays this queerness to the reader through a dissection of the heteronormative lens that blinds the narrator to their feelings for their older counterparts, as is the case in both "The Tale of the Shoe" and "The Tale of the Hair" when each narrator expects to find happiness in marriage to a prince and instead finds it with the witch and the huntswoman respectively. This pulls them from the normative ideas of gender roles and sexuality they were previously grounded in and forces them to inhabit an unfamiliar and sometimes—in the case of the first tale's pseudo-Cinderella—disorienting existence.

== Reception ==
=== Awards & Recognition ===
Kissing the Witch was recognized as a 1997 New York Times Book Review Notable Book of the Year. The collection was named as a Capitol Choices Noteworthy Book for Children and Teens in 1997 and an ALA Popular Paperback for Young Adults in 2000. In 1997, the collection was shortlisted for an Otherwise Award for science fiction or fantasy that discusses and transforms gender roles.

== Adaptations ==
=== Theatre ===
In June 2000, San Francisco's Magic Theatre commissioned a two-act stage version of Kissing the Witch to be directed by Kent Nicholson. The adaptation of the collection featured five out of the thirteen stories published in the original work. Act One comprised "The Tale of the Rose", "The Tale of the Skin", and "The Tale of the Handkerchief" while Act Two contained "The Tale of the Voice" and "The Tale of the Witch". The cast was made up of three actresses—Emily Ackerman, Margaret Schenck, and Cambron Williams—and one actor (Mark Phillips). The "Dramatis Personae" section of the play details the casting ages for each actor as well as which role the three women will play. The singular man plays every male character in the five sections; no specification is given for casting based on age or appearance.
