= Hood (novel) =

1995 novel by Emma Donoghue

- First edition (UK)
- Author: Emma Donoghue
- Language: English
- Genre: Novel
- Publisher: Hamish Hamilton (UK); HarperCollins (US)
- Publication date: 1995
- Publication place: Ireland
- Media type: Print (hardcover and paperback)
- Pages: 320 (hardback)
- ISBN: 1555834531

Hood is the second novel by Irish-Canadian author Emma Donoghue, published in 1995. The book was the recipient of the 1997 Stonewall Book Award and is heavily influenced by James Joyce's Ulysses.

== Publication history ==
Hood was first published in the United States in 1995 and most recently published by HarperCollins in 2011.

== Plot summary ==
Hood takes place in the seven days after Pen O'Grady's lover, Cara Wall, is killed in a car accident. The two had been together for thirteen years, after meeting as schoolgirls in a Catholic school in Dublin. The story combines flashbacks, giving the history of Pen and Cara's complex and tumultuous relationship, with details of the various ways Pen feels and responds to grief, the reactions of people who do or do not know the nature of the relationship, Pen's feelings about lesbians in Ireland, and several decisions to come out to those close to her.

== Awards ==
Hood received the Stonewall Book Award 1997.

== Reception ==
Shortly after release, Hood was reviewed in the The New York Times and The Boston Globe. The New York Times called it "charming" and said Donoghue "dip[s] into the ordinary with control and the occasional sustaining descriptive flashes of a born writer". Kirkus Reviews called it "profoundly moving", "an elegiac reconstruction of a long love affair", and a "spare, powerful narrative".

== Major themes ==
Hood is about a semi-closeted lesbian in Ireland. Scholarly writing about the novel has noted themes of Catholicism, closets, and the home.
