= Room (novel) =

2010 novel by Emma Donoghue

- First UK edition
- Author: Emma Donoghue
- Cover artist: Cassia Beck (photography)
- Language: English
- Genre: Novel
- Publisher: HarperCollins (Canada); Picador (UK); Little, Brown (US)
- Publication date: 6 August 2010
- Publication place: Canada; Ireland
- Media type: Print (hardcover and paperback)
- Pages: 336 pp (hardback)
- ISBN: 978-0-330-53397-3
- Preceded by: The Sealed Letter

Room is a 2010 novel by Irish-Canadian author Emma Donoghue. The story is told from the perspective of a five-year-old boy, Jack, who is being held captive in a small room along with his mother. Donoghue conceived the story after hearing about five-year-old Felix in the Fritzl case.

The novel was longlisted for the 2011 Orange Prize and won the 2011 Commonwealth Writers' Prize regional prize (Caribbean and Canada). It was shortlisted for the Booker Prize in 2010, and was shortlisted for the 2010 Rogers Writers' Trust Fiction Prize and the 2010 Governor General's Awards.

The film adaptation, also titled Room, was released in October 2015, starring Brie Larson and Jacob Tremblay. The film was a critical and commercial success; it received four nominations at the 88th Academy Awards including for Best Picture, and won Best Actress for Larson.

A stage adaptation opened in 2017 to positive reviews.

== Plot summary ==
Five-year old Jack lives with his 26-year old Ma in "Room," a secure single-room outbuilding containing a small kitchen, a basic bathroom, a wardrobe, a bed, and a TV set. Because it is all he has ever known, Jack believes that only Room and the things it contains (such as himself and Ma) are "real." Ma, unwilling to disappoint Jack with a life she cannot give him, allows Jack to believe that the rest of the world only exists on television. Ma tries her best to keep Jack healthy and happy via both physical and mental exercises, keeping a healthy diet, limiting TV-watching time, and adhering to strict body and oral hygiene. The only other person Jack has ever seen is "Old Nick," who visits Room at night and brings them food and necessities while Jack sleeps hidden in a wardrobe. Jack is unaware that Old Nick kidnapped Ma when she was 19 and has kept her imprisoned for the past seven years. Old Nick regularly rapes Ma; Jack is the product of one such encounter.

A week after Jack's fifth birthday, Ma learns that Old Nick has been unemployed for the past six months and is at risk of losing his home to foreclosure. Fearing that Old Nick will kill them both before freeing them, Ma comes up with a plan to convince Old Nick that Jack is deathly ill. Jack, initially unable to conceptualize being outside of Room or interacting with other people, eventually agrees. When Old Nick refuses to take Jack to a hospital, Ma wraps Jack in a rug and claims he has died. Old Nick falls for the ruse and takes Jack outside; Jack escapes and manages to reach a stranger, who contacts the police. In spite of his inability to communicate effectively, Jack describes the route to Room to an officer to free Ma.

The two are taken to a mental hospital, where they receive medical evaluations and a temporary home. Old Nick is found and faces numerous charges of abduction, rape, and child endangerment. While in the hospital, Ma is reunited with her family, learning that her parents have divorced and her brother now has a family of his own. Ma begins to relearn how to interact with the larger world, while an overwhelmed Jack yearns to return to the safety of Room. Ma's father refuses to accept Jack as his grandson. Jack also learns that before he was born, Ma gave birth to a stillborn daughter.

Meanwhile, Jack and Ma's case attracts significant mass media attention, making it harder for them to start leading a normal life. After a television interview ends badly, Ma suffers a mental breakdown and attempts suicide. While Ma is in the hospital, Jack goes to live with his grandmother and her new partner. Jack becomes increasingly frustrated with his extended family, who, while kind and loving, often fail to consider how his limited experience impacts his behavior.

After Ma recovers, she and Jack move into independent living. Jack asks to visit Room one final time. Upon returning, Jack finds that he no longer feels any emotional attachment toward it, and says his goodbyes to Room before leaving.

== Awards and honours ==
- New York Times bestseller (Fiction, 2010)
- Booker Prize, shortlist (2010)
- Rogers Writers' Trust Fiction Prize (2010)
- Indigo Books Heather's Pick (2010)
- New York Times Best Books of the Year (2010)
- New York Times Notable Book of the Year (Fiction & Poetry, 2010)
- Salon Book Award (Fiction, 2010)
- Governor General's Award shortlist (Fiction, 2010)
- Publishers Weekly Listen Up Award (Audio Book of the Year, 2010)
- Goodreads Choice Awards, Best Fiction (2010)
- Alex Award (2011)
- ALA Notable Book (2011)
- Hughes & Hughes Irish Novel of the Year, Irish Book Awards (2010)
- Commonwealth Writers' Prize (Canada and the Caribbean, 2011)
- Indies Choice Book Award (Adult Fiction, 2011)
- Orange Prize, shortlist (2011)
- WH Smith Paperback of the Year, Galaxy National Book Awards (2011)
- International Dublin Literary Award nomination (2012)

== Adaptations ==
A film adaptation, directed by Lenny Abrahamson and written by Donoghue, was made in 2015. The film stars Brie Larson, Joan Allen, William H. Macy, Sean Bridgers, and Jacob Tremblay. It was shown in the Special Presentations section of the 2015 Toronto International Film Festival, after premiering at the Telluride Film Festival. The film began a limited release on October 16, 2015, and was released nationwide on November 6, 2015, by A24 Films. The film received widespread critical acclaim and won numerous awards. It received four nominations at the 88th Academy Awards including Best Picture, Best Director, Best Adapted Screenplay and winning Best Actress for Larson. Donoghue herself received honours for her adaptation of her novel, including Best Adapted Screenplay at the 4th Canadian Screen Awards and Best Scriptwriter at the 13th Irish Film & Television Awards.

Donoghue also wrote a stage adaptation. The play with music premiered 10 May 2017 at the Theatre Royal Stratford East to largely positive reviews.

== See also ==
- Fiction about rape
