= Inseparable (Donoghue book) =

2010 non-fiction book by Emma Donoghue

Inseparable: Desire Between Women in Literature
- First edition cover
- Author: Emma Donoghue
- Language: English
- Subject: Western literature
- Publisher: Knopf
- Publication date: 2010
- Publication place: New York
- Pages: 304
- Awards: Israel Fishman Non-Fiction Award (2011)
- ISBN: 978-0-307-27094-8

Inseparable: Desire Between Women in Literature is a non-fiction book by Emma Donoghue. The book is a work of literary criticism that covers female same-sex relationships in Western literature. It was published in 2010 by Knopf and received positive reviews, winning the Israel Fishman Non-Fiction Award at the 2011 Stonewall Book Awards.
