= Emma Donoghue =

Irish-Canadian writer (born 1969)

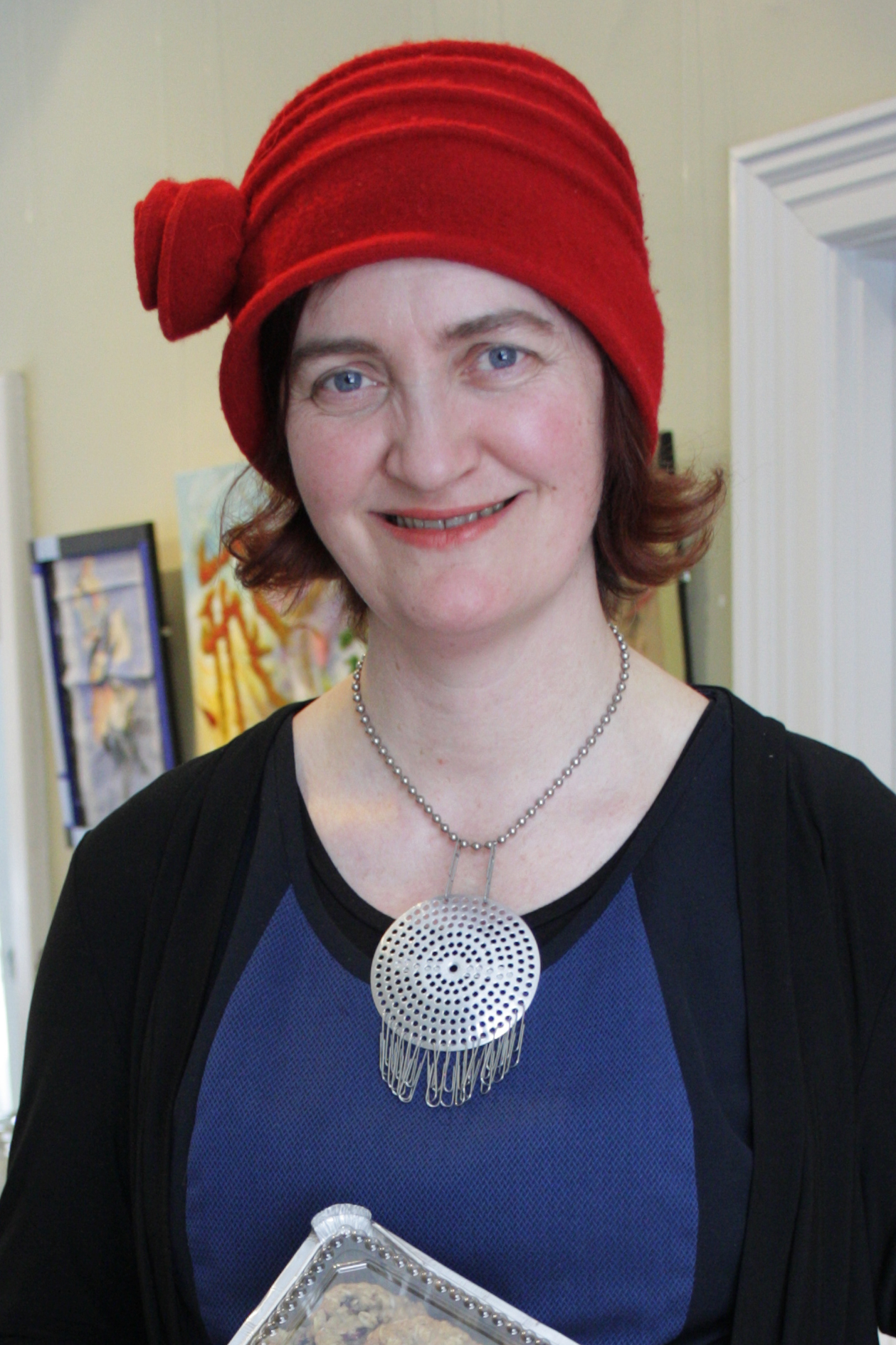
- Donoghue in Toronto on 18 February 2015
- Born: October 1969 (age 57); Dublin, Ireland
- Occupations: Novelist, short story writer, playwright, literary historian
- Partner: Christine Roulston
- Children: 2
- Website: www.emmadonoghue.com

Emma Donoghue (born October 1969) is an Irish Canadian novelist, screenwriter, playwright and literary historian. Her 2010 novel Room was a finalist for the Booker Prize and an international best-seller. Donoghue's 1995 novel Hood won the Stonewall Book Award and Slammerkin (2000) won the Ferro-Grumley Award for Lesbian Fiction. She is a 2011 recipient of the Alex Awards. Room was adapted by Donoghue into a film of the same name. For this, she was nominated for the Academy Award for Best Adapted Screenplay. In 2025, Donoghue won the Alice B Readers Award given annually to living writers of published works whose careers are distinguished by consistently well-written works about lesbians.

== Background ==
Donoghue was born in Dublin, Ireland, in 1969. The youngest of eight children, she is the daughter of Frances (née Rutledge) and academic and literary critic Denis Donoghue. She has a first-class honours Bachelor of Arts degree from University College Dublin (in English and French) and a PhD in English from Girton College, Cambridge. While at Cambridge she lived in a women's co-operative, an experience which inspired her short story "The Welcome". Her thesis was on friendship between men and women in 18th-century fiction.

At Cambridge, she met her future wife, Christine Roulston, a Canadian who is now professor of French and Women's Studies at the University of Western Ontario. They moved permanently to Canada in 1998 and Donoghue became a Canadian citizen in 2004. She lives in London, Ontario, with Roulston and their two children.

== Influences and approach to writing ==
Donoghue has spoken of the importance of the writing of Emily Dickinson, as well as Jeanette Winterson's novel The Passion and Alan Garner's Red Shift in the development of her work. She says that she aims to be "industrious and unpretentious" about the process of writing, and that her working life has changed since having children.

== Works ==
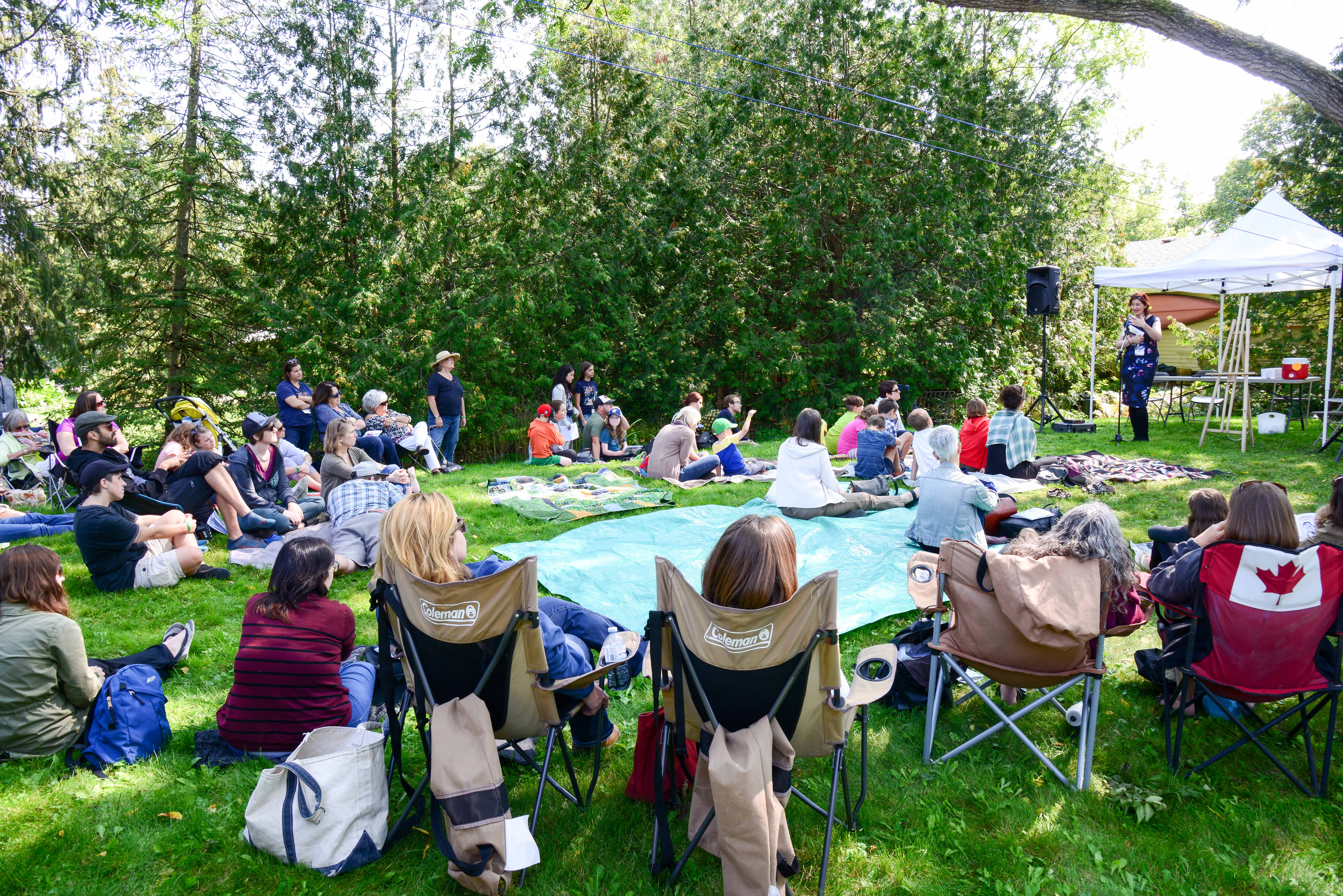
Donoghue reading at the Eden Mills Writers' Festival in 2017

=== Stir Fry and Hood ===
Donoghue's first novel was 1994's Stir Fry, a contemporary coming of age novel about a young Irish woman discovering her sexuality. It was a finalist for the Lambda Literary Award in 1994. This was followed in 1995 by Hood, another contemporary story, this time about an Irish woman coming to terms with the death of her girlfriend. Hood won the 1997 American Library Association's Gay, Lesbian and Bisexual Book Award for Literature (now known as the Stonewall Book Award for Literature).

=== Slammerkin ===
Slammerkin (2000) is a historical novel set in London and Wales. Inspired by an 18th-century newspaper story about a young servant who killed her employer and was executed, the protagonist is a prostitute who longs for fine clothes. It was a finalist for the 2001 Irish Literature Prize for Fiction and was awarded the 2002 Ferro-Grumley Award for Lesbian Fiction (despite a lack of lesbian content).

=== Landing ===
Her 2007 novel, Landing, portrays a long-distance relationship between a Canadian curator and an Irish flight attendant.

=== The Sealed Letter ===
The Sealed Letter (2008), another work of historical fiction, is based on the Codrington Affair, a scandalous divorce case that gripped Britain in 1864. The protagonist is Emily Faithfull. The Sealed Letter was longlisted for the Giller Prize and was joint winner with Chandra Mayor's All the Pretty Girls of the 2009 Lambda Literary Award for Lesbian Fiction.

=== Room ===
On 27 July 2010, Donoghue's novel Room was longlisted for the Man Booker Prize and on 7 September 2010 it made the shortlist. On 2 November 2010, it was announced that Room had been awarded the Rogers Writers' Trust Fiction Prize. Room was also shortlisted for the 2010 Governor General's Awards in Canada, and was the winner of the Irish Book Award 2010. It was short-listed for the Orange Prize for Fiction 2011, but lost out to Téa Obreht. Donoghue later wrote the screenplay for a film version of the book, Room (2015), for which she was nominated for an Academy Award, Golden Globe and BAFTA Award, and in 2017 adapted it into a play performed at the Abbey Theatre in Dublin.

=== Frog Music ===
Donoghue's novel Frog Music, a historical fiction book based on the true story of a murdered 19th-century cross-dressing frog catcher, was published in 2014.

=== The Wonder ===
Donoghue's 2016 novel The Wonder was shortlisted for the Scotiabank Giller Prize. It describes a case of Anorexia mirabilis in which an English nurse is brought in to observe a fasting girl in a devout Irish family; the after effects of the Crimean War, in which the protagonist served, and the Great Famine, in which the family suffered, cast their shadows.

A film of the novel was released in autumn 2022. Directed by Sebastián Lelio, the screenplay is by Donoghue and Alice Birch, with Florence Pugh in the leading role. David Ehrlich of IndieWire called it a "sumptuous but slightly undercooked tale", praising Lelio's direction, the performances, the cinematography, and the score. Peter Bruge praised the cast performances in his review for Variety but criticized the screenplay, summarizing it as an "evenhanded but ultimately preposterous adaptation". The Hollywood Reporter's Stephen Farber found it an "illuminating study of dark prejudices" and commended Pugh's performance, as well as Lelio's direction which he said represents perhaps his "finest achievement to date".

=== Akin ===
Akin (2019) is a contemporary novel, though with much discussion of events during the Second World War in France. Alex Preston in The Guardian called it "dispiriting".

=== The Pull of the Stars ===
Donoghue's novel The Pull of the Stars (2020), written in 2018–2019, was published earlier than originally planned because it was set in the 1918 influenza pandemic in Dublin, Ireland. All the characters were fictional except Dr Kathleen Lynn. The novel received strongly positive reviews from critics and was longlisted for the Giller Prize in 2020.

=== Haven ===
This novel, published in 2022, is set among monks in the seventh century on Skellig Michael. Hephzibah Anderson, in The Guardian, wrote that "While Haven certainly isn’t her most accessible novel, a flinty kind of hope brightens its satisfying ending. What the reader is likely to take away, however, is the image of a bleak place made still bleaker by human intervention". It was shortlisted for the 2024 International Dublin Literary Award.

=== Learned by Heart ===
This novel published in 2023 explores the relationship between Anne Lister and Eliza Raine during their time at Miss Hargrave's Manor school. The novel delves into their deep connection and Eliza's reflections from an asylum. While praised for its portrayal of first love, some critics found the detailed depiction of school life overshadowed the central narrative.

Learned by Heart was shortlisted for the 2023 Atwood Gibson Writers' Trust Fiction Prize.

=== The Paris Express ===
The Paris Express (2025) is inspired by the Montparnasse derailment of 1895 Paris.

The book was shortlisted for the 2025 Giller Prize.

== Bibliography ==
=== Novels ===
- Stir Fry (1994)
- Hood (1995)
- Slammerkin (2000)
- Life Mask (2004)
- Landing (2007)
- The Sealed Letter (2008)
- Room (2010) ISBN 978-0-316-12057-9
- Frog Music (2014)
- The Wonder (2016)
- The Lotterys series:
  1. The Lotterys Plus One (2017)
  2. The Lotterys More or Less (2018)
- Akin (2019)
- The Pull of the Stars (2020)
- Haven (2022)
- Learned by Heart (2023)
- The Paris Express (2025)

=== Short stories ===
Collections:

- Kissing the Witch: Old Tales in New Skins, AKA Kissing the Witch (1997), collection of 13 short stories:
  "The Tale of the Shoe", "The Tale of the Bird", "The Tale of the Rose", "The Tale of the Apple", "The Tale of the Handkerchief", "The Tale of the Hair", "The Tale of the Brother", "The Tale of the Spinster", "The Tale of the Cottage", "The Tale of the Skin", "The Tale of the Needle", "The Tale of the Voice", "The Tale of the Kiss"
- The Woman Who Gave Birth to Rabbits (2002), a collection of 17 short stories:
  "Acts of Union", "Account", "Ballad", "Come, Gentle Night", "Cured", "Dido", "The Last Rabbit", "The Necessity of Burning", "Revelations", "Salvage", "Night Vision", "Figures of Speech", "A Short Story", "The Fox on the Line", "How a Lady Dies", "Looking for Petronilla", "Words for Things"
- Touchy Subjects (2006), a collection of 19 short stories:
  "The Dormition of the Virgin", "Baggage", "WritOr", "Lavender's Blue", "Through the Night", "The Man Who Wrote on Beaches", "Do They Know It's Christmas", "Good Deed", "The Sanctuary of Hands", "Necessary Noise", "Pluck", "Team Men", "Enchantment", "The Welcome", "Oops", "The Cost of Things", "Speaking in Tongues", "Touchy Subjects", "Expecting"
- Three and a Half Deaths (2011), a collection of 4 short stories:
  "What the Driver Saw", "The Trap", "Sissy", "Fall"
- Astray (2012), a collection of 14 short stories:
  "The Lost Seed", "The Widow's Cruse", "The Hunt", "Vanitas", "Counting the Days", "Last Supper at Brown's", "Onward", "The Body Swap", "The Long Way Home", "Man and Boy", "Snowblind", "The Gift", "Daddy's Girl", "What Remains"

Uncollected short stories:

- "Going Back" (1993)
- "Seven Pictures Not Taken" (1996)
- "Error Messages" (1999)
- "Thicker Than Water" (2001)
- "Here and Now" (2006)
- "Dear Lang" (2009) in How Beautiful the Ordinary: Twelve Stories of Identity (ed. Michael Chart)
- "Tableau Vivant" (2010)
- "Visiting Hours" (2011), based on her radio play "The Modern Family"
- "Urban Myths" (2012), based on her homonymous radio play
- "Spelled Backward" (2012)
- "Since First I Saw Your Face" (2016)
- "The Big Cheese" (2017)
- "Halfway to Free" (2020)

=== Plays ===
Collections:

- Emma Donoghue: Selected Plays (2015), collection of 5 plays:
  "Kissing the Witch" (based on 5 short stories of her homonymous collection), "Don't Die Wondering" (based on her homonymous radio play), "Trespasses" (based on her homonymous radio play), "Ladies and Gentlemen", "I Know My Own Heart"

Uncollected plays:

- "Trespasses" (1996), radio play
- "Don't Die Wondering" (2000), radio play
- Exes series (2001), radio plays:
  - "Urban Myths"
  - "The Modern Family"
  - "The Conspiracy"
  - "The Mothers"
  - "The Estate Agent"
- "Humans and Other Animals" (2003), radio play
- "Mix" (2003), radio play
- "The Talk of the Town" (2012)
- "Signatories" (2016)
- "Room" (2017), based on her homonymous novel
- "The Wind Coming Over the Sea" (2025) a romantic musical based on letters between an Antrim couple struggling during the famine. Originally produced by Blyth Festival, in Blyth Ontario, and produced by Nova Scotian Professional Theatre Two Planks and a Passion Theatre in 2026.

=== Screenplays ===
- Pluck (2001)
- Room (2015)
- The Wonder (2022)
- H Is for Hawk (2025)

=== Non-fiction ===
Biographies

- We Are Michael Field (1998)

History

- Passions Between Women: British Lesbian Culture 1668–1801 (1993)
- Inseparable: Desire Between Women in Literature (2010)

Articles

- "Out of Order: Kate O'Brien's Lesbian Fictions" in Ordinary People Dancing, ed. by Eibhear Walsh (Cork: Cork University Press, 1993)
- "Noises from Woodsheds: The Muffled Voices of Irish Lesbian Fiction" in Volcanoes and Pearl Divers, ed. by Suzanne Raitt (London: Onlywomen Press, 1994)
- "Liberty in Chains: The Diaries of Anne Lister (1817-24)" in Breaking the Barriers to Desire (Nottingham: Five Leaves Press, 1995)
- "Divided Heart, Divided History: Eighteenth-Century Bisexual Heroines" in Bisexual Horizons: Politics, Histories, Lives, ed. by Sharon Rose, Cris Stevens et al. (London: Lawrence & Wishart, 1996)
- "How Could I Fear and Hold Thee by the Hand? The Poetry of Eva Gore-Booth" in Sex, Nation and Dissent in Irish Writing, ed. by Eibhear Walshe (Cork: Cork University Press, 1997)
- "A Tale of Two Annies" in Butch/Femme: Inside Lesbian Gender, ed. by Sally Munt (London: Cassell, 1998)
- Articles on Anne Lister, Ladies of Llangollen and Jane Pirie and Marianne Woods, in Lesbian Histories and Cultures: An Encyclopedia, ed. by Bonnie Zimmerman (New York and London: Garland, 2000)
- Introduction to Virago Modern Classics edition of Molly Keane, Time After Time (London: Virago, 2001)
- Introduction to Virago Modern Classics edition of Polly Devlin, All of Us There (London: Virago, 2003)
- Introduction to Isabel Miller, Patience and Sarah (Vancouver: Arsenal Pulp Press, 2005)
- "Doing Lesbian History, Then and Now" in Historical Reflections / Reflexions Historiques (Vol. 33, No. 1, Spring 2007)
- "Picking Up Broken Glass, or, Turning Lesbian History into Fiction" in Sapphists and Sexologists: Histories of Sexualities Volume 2, ed. Sonja Tiernan and Mary McAuliffe (Cambridge: Cambridge Scholars Press, 2009)
- "Embraces of Love" in Faithful Companions: Collected Essays Celebrating the 25th Anniversary of the Kate O'Brien Literary Weekend, ed. Mary Coll (Limerick: Mellick Press, 2009)
- "Random Shafts of Malice?: the Outings of Anne Damer" in Lesbian Dames: Sapphism in the Long Eighteenth Century, ed. by John C. Beynon and Caroline Gonda (Farnham, Surrey: Ashgate, 2010)

=== Works edited ===
- What Sappho Would Have Said (1997)
- The Mammoth Book of Lesbian Short Stories (1999)

== Adaptations ==
- Pluck (2001), short directed by Neasa Hardiman, based on short story "Pluck"
- Room (2015), film directed by Lenny Abrahamson, based on novel Room
- The Wonder (2022), Netflix movie directed by Sebastián Lelio, based on the 2016 novel Wonder
