= Ethan Tobman =

Canadian production designer

- Born: 30 May 1979 (age 47); Montreal, Canada
- Occupation: Production designer Director
- Awards: Canadian Screen Award for Best Art Direction/Production Design

Ethan Tobman (born May 30, 1979) is a Canadian film production designer and director.

== Biography ==
Tobman was born on May 30, 1979 in Montreal. He directed the short film Remote, which screened at the 2001 Cannes Film Festival. The Hollywood Reporter positively reviewed Tobman's production design for the 2014 film That Awkward Moment.

He served as production designer for the 2015 Canadian-Irish film Room, for which he and Mary Kirkland won the Canadian Screen Award for Best Achievement in Art Direction/Production Design. In designing the eponymous Room set at Pinewood Toronto Studios, he set out with the idea "that every square inch of Room needed to have a backstory." Tobman also proposed an "inverted Rubik's Cube" for a set, with removable parts. Tobman subsequently worked on Felix van Groeningen's 2018 Beautiful Boy. Using the house from the TV series Big Little Lies for a set, he made numerous alterations including to the counters.

Tobman has also served as a production designer for music videos, including "Formation" and "Lemonade" by Beyoncé. In 2014, for the music video "The Writing's on the Wall" by the U.S. band OK Go, he was tasked with helping create a number of perspective illusions. He served as creative director and production designer for Taylor Swift's The Eras Tour concert tour and its related concert film Taylor Swift: The Eras Tour.

Tobman has been the recipient of three Art Directors Guild Awards: "Black Is King," directed by Beyoncé (2020); "All Too Well: The Short Film," by Taylor Swift (2021); and "I Can See You," by Taylor Swift (2023). He has also been nominated for three MTV Music Video Awards for Art Direction: "Not Afraid," by Eminem (2010); "Willow," by Taylor Swift (2020); and "Fortnight," by Taylor Swift (2024).

Tobman won the Juno Award for Video of the Year at the Juno Awards of 2024, for his music video for Allison Russell's "Demons." In the same year, the Prism Prize named Tobman as the recipient of its Special Achievement Award.

== Filmography ==
=== Films ===
- The F Word (2013)
- That Awkward Moment (2014)
- Room (2015)
- Wilson (2017)
- Kin (2018)
- Beautiful Boy (2018)
- The Report (2019)
- Free Guy (2021)
- All Too Well: The Short Film (2021)
- The Menu (2022)
- Taylor Swift: The Eras Tour (2023)
- Madame Web (2024)

=== Documentaries ===
- Taylor Swift: The End of an Era (2025; creative producer and production designer)

=== Visual albums ===
- Beyoncé: Lemonade by Beyoncé (2016)
- Black Is King by Beyoncé (2020)

=== Music videos ===
- "The Writing's on the Wall" by OK Go (2014)
- "Formation" by Beyoncé (2016)
- "The Man" by Taylor Swift (2019)
- "Cardigan" by Taylor Swift (2020)
- "Anti-Hero" by Taylor Swift (2022)
- "Bejeweled" by Taylor Swift (2022)
- "Lavender Haze" by Taylor Swift (2022)
- "Karma" by Taylor Swift ft. Ice Spice (2022)
- "I Can See You" by Taylor Swift (2023)
- "Fortnight" by Taylor Swift (2024)
- "The Fate of Ophelia" by Taylor Swift (2025)
