= Charles Clover (environmental journalist) =

Environmental journalist, author

Charles Clover is an environmental journalist, author and charity executive. A proponent of marine rewilding, he is senior consultant to Blue Marine Foundation, a charity that he co-founded with the producers of The End of the Line, a documentary film based on his eponymous book.

== Education ==
Clover was educated at Westminster School, before reading English and Philosophy at the University of York.

== Career ==
=== Print journalist ===
Clover was an environmental journalist for The Daily Telegraph, including as Environment Editor for 22 years, before joining The Sunday Times.

He was voted national journalist of the year three times by the British Environment and Media Awards.

He is an occasional contributor to The Guardian.

=== Author and documentary maker ===
In 1993, Clover co-wrote Highgrove, Portrait of an Estate with Charles, Prince of Wales (later Charles III) regarding organic farming at the Highgrove House estate.

In 2004, Clover wrote The End of the Line: How Overfishing Is Changing the World and What We Eat, a non-fiction book about overfishing, for which Clover was awarded the Guild of Food Writers' Derek Cooper Award, André Simon Award and a Zoological Society of London Award. The book was made into a 2009 documentary film, The End of the Line, directed by Rupert Murray and narrated by Ted Danson, It was nominated for a Grand Jury Prize at the 2009 Sundance Film Festival and for a 2009 British Independent Film Award. The film holds a 78% score on review aggregator website, Rotten Tomatoes. To highlight the film's message on the overfishing of Bluefin Tuna, Clover co-wrote an op-ed in The Wall Street Journal with Albert II, Prince of Monaco.

In 2022, Clover wrote Rewilding the Sea - How to Save Our Oceans.

=== Charity executive ===
Clover co-founded the environmental charity Blue Marine Foundation with two of the producers of The End of the Line, Chris Gorell Barnes and George Duffield. He served as its executive chairman, executive director and is now its senior consultant.

== Honours ==
An honorary doctorate was conferred on Clover by the University of Essex in 2022 in recognition of his work on conservation. Clover was previously a visiting professor in the School of Life Sciences at the university.

== Bibliography ==
- Highgrove: an experiment in organic gardening and farming, 1993, Simon & Schuster, ISBN 9780671791773.
- Highgrove, Portrait of an Estate, 1993, Orion Publishing Group, ISBN 9781855926103.
- The End of the Line: How Overfishing Is Changing the World and What We Eat, 2009, Ebury Press, ISBN 9780091897802.
- Rewilding the Sea - How to Save Our Oceans, 2022, Ebury Press, ISBN 9781529144031

== Filmography ==
- The End of the Line, 2009.
