= Rodeo FX =

Visual effects company

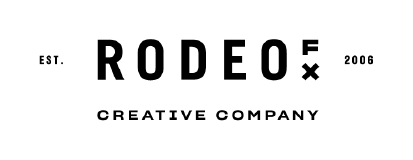
- Type: Private
- Industry: Visual effects, Advertising, Experience, CGI Animation
- Founded: 2006; 20 years ago, in Montreal, Canada
- Founder: Sébastien Moreau
- Headquarters: 99 Prince Street, Montreal, Quebec, Canada
- Number of locations: 6
- Key people: Sébastien Moreau (president & VFX supervisor)
- Products: Visual effects; Computer animation
- Number of employees: 900
- Subsidiaries: Mikros Animation
- Website: rodeofx.com

Rodeo FX is a Canadian visual effects, computer animation and creative company offering services in visual effects, advertising, animation, and experiential. The company currently has studios in Montreal, Quebec City, Toronto, Vancouver, Paris and Los Angeles.

== History ==
Rodeo FX was founded in 2006 in Montreal, Canada, by Sébastien Moreau and started producing visual effects for feature films in 2007. In 2013, the company started producing visual effects for television for the first time, creating over 150 visually altered shots for the fourth season of the HBO fantasy series Game of Thrones. In early 2014, it expanded outside of Montreal for the first time, opening an office in Quebec City, which now employs 35 animators and VFX-artists. In December 2014, following its acquisition of the VFX company Hatch FX, Rodeo FX opened an office in Los Angeles. According to Jordan Soles, Rodeo's vice president of technology and development, the step was taken to bring the company closer to the studios, directors and the film development process itself. In November 2017, the company announced the opening of a new office in Munich, Germany, to establish a hub for the visual effects market in Europe, but has since moved to their European office to Paris, France as of June 2023. On March 27, 2025, it was announced that Rodeo FX would acquire Mikros Animation, after Technicolor Group filed for bankruptcy.

The studio's VFX work has been rewarded on many occasions, including an Academy Award and BAFTA for their work on the Golden Compass as well as many Visual Effects Society Award for visual effects; these included two for the television series Game of Thrones and four for motion pictures. The company has also received three Emmy Award for Outstanding Special Effects for its participation in the TV series Game of Thrones as well as three HPA (Hollywood Professional Association) Awards for the same series.

== Filmography ==
=== Films ===
- 2007: Nitro
- 2007: Continental, un film sans fusil
- 2007: The Golden Compass
- 2008: La ligne brisée
- 2008: It's Not Me, I Swear! (C'est pas moi, je le jure!)
- 2008: Death Race
- 2008: Journey to the Center of the Earth
- 2008: Indiana Jones and the Kingdom of the Crystal Skull
- 2008: The Day the Earth Stood Still
- 2009: Cadavres
- 2009: Mr. Nobody
- 2009: Journey to Mecca
- 2009: Amelia
- 2009: Terminator Salvation
- 2010: 10½
- 2010: Incendies
- 2010: Repo Men
- 2010: Jonah Hex
- 2010: The Twilight Saga: Eclipse
- 2010: The Last Airbender
- 2010: Resident Evil: Afterlife
- 2010: Gulliver's Travels
- 2011: En terrains connus
- 2011: Le bonheur des autres
- 2011: Monsieur Lazhar
- 2011: Rango
- 2011: Source Code
- 2011: Immortals
- 2011: The Three Musketeers
- 2011: Mission: Impossible – Ghost Protocol
- 2012: Red Tails
- 2012: Underworld: Awakening
- 2012: Mirror Mirror
- 2012: Abraham Lincoln: Vampire Hunter
- 2012: The Amazing Spider-Man
- 2012: The Twilight Saga: Breaking Dawn – Part 2
- 2013: Jack the Giant Slayer
- 2013: The Host
- 2013: Percy Jackson: Sea of Monsters
- 2013: Pain & Gain
- 2013: Now You See Me
- 2013: Pacific Rim
- 2013: The Smurfs 2
- 2013: Jerusalem
- 2013: Enemy
- 2013: The Hunger Games: Catching Fire
- 2014: Beauty and the Beast
- 2014: Lucy
- 2014: Edge of Tomorrow
- 2014: Birdman
- 2014: Unbroken
- 2014: 22 Jump Street
- 2015: Jupiter Ascending
- 2015: Cinderella
- 2015: Furious 7
- 2015: Tomorrowland
- 2015: By the Sea
- 2015: Fantastic Four
- 2015: The Intern
- 2015: The Walk
- 2015: The Last Witch Hunter
- 2015: In the Heart of the Sea
- 2016: Deadpool
- 2016: Gods of Egypt
- 2016: The Divergent Series: Allegiant
- 2016: Two Lovers and a Bear
- 2016: Warcraft
- 2016: Central Intelligence
- 2016: The Legend of Tarzan
- 2016: Star Trek Beyond
- 2016: Nine Lives
- 2016: Arrival
- 2016: Wait Till Helen Comes
- 2016: Queen of Katwe
- 2016: The Promise
- 2016: Miss Peregrine's Home for Peculiar Children
- 2016: Fantastic Beasts and Where to Find Them
- 2016: Bad Santa 2
- 2016: Silence
- 2016: Assassin's Creed
- 2016: Resident Evil: The Final Chapter
- 2017: The Space Between Us
- 2017: Kong: Skull Island
- 2017: The Shack
- 2017: The Fate of the Furious
- 2017: The Promise
- 2017: Pirates of the Caribbean: Dead Men Tell No Tales
- 2017: Valérian and the City of a Thousand Planets
- 2017: The Gracefield Incident
- 2017: Downsizing
- 2017: It
- 2017: Home Again
- 2017: Blade Runner 2049
- 2017: Thor: Ragnarok
- 2017: Justice League
- 2017: Paddington 2
- 2017: Jumanji: Welcome to the Jungle
- 2017: Star Wars: The Last Jedi
- 2017: The Greatest Showman
- 2018: Black Panther
- 2018: Game Night
- 2018: A Wrinkle In Time
- 2018: Death Wish
- 2018: Paradox
- 2018: Sicario: Day of the Soldado
- 2018: Ant-Man and the Wasp
- 2018: Asura
- 2018: The Death and Life of John F. Donovan
- 2018: The House with a Clock in Its Walls
- 2018: Overlord
- 2018: The Nutcracker and the Four Realms
- 2018: Fantastic Beasts: The Crimes of Grindelwald
- 2018: Mowgli: Legend of the Jungle
- 2018: Aquaman
- 2018: Bumblebee
- 2019: The Kid Who Would Be King
- 2019: Dumbo
- 2019: Shazam!
- 2019: Pokémon Detective Pikachu
- 2019: Men in Black: International
- 2019: Godzilla: King of the Monsters
- 2019: Dark Phoenix
- 2019: Crawl
- 2019: It – Chapter Two
- 2019: Super Intelligence
- 2019: Child's Play
- 2019: Anna
- 2019: El Camino: A Breaking Bad Movie
- 2019: Extraction
- 2019: Jumanji: The Next Level
- 2019: Zombieland: Double Tap
- 2019: The Aeronauts
- 2020: Bloodshot
- 2020: Magic Camp
- 2020: Jingle Jangle: A Christmas Journey
- 2020: We Can Be Heroes
- 2021: Chaos Walking
- 2021: Zack Snyder's Justice League
- 2021: Those Who Wish Me Dead
- 2021: The Conjuring: The Devil Made Me Do It
- 2021: Jungle Cruise
- 2021: Shang-Chi and the Legend of the Ten Rings
- 2021: Dune
- 2021: The Tender Bar
- 2022: Fantastic Beasts: The Secrets of Dumbledore
- 2022: Slumberland
- 2022: Black Adam
- 2023: John Wick: Chapter 4
- 2023: The Little Mermaid
- 2023: Guardians of the Galaxy Vol. 3
- 2023: Heart of Stone
- 2023: Blue Beetle
- 2023: Mission: Impossible – Dead Reckoning Part One
- 2023: Aquaman and the Lost Kingdom
- 2023: Rebel Moon — Part One: A Child of Fire
- 2023: White Bird
- 2024: Argylle
- 2024: Dune: Part Two
- 2024: Venom: The Last Dance
- 2024: Kraven the Hunter
- 2024: Sonic the Hedgehog 3

=== Television ===
- 2014: Game of Thrones – Season 4
- 2015: Game of Thrones – Season 5
- 2015: Fear the Walking Dead
- 2018: Krypton
- 2018: Tom Clancy's Jack Ryan
- 2019: Stranger Things – Season 3
- 2019: The Boys
- 2019: Locke & Key
- 2019: Snowpiercer
- 2019: Watchmen
- 2019: Raising Dion
- 2020: Stranger Things - Season 4
- 2021: WandaVision
- 2021: The Falcon and the Winter Soldier
- 2022: The Lord of the Rings: The Rings of Power
- 2022: The Guardians of the Galaxy Holiday Special
- 2025: It: Welcome to Derry

== Awards and nominations ==
The following list of awards and nominations for Rodeo FX lists accolades that have been presented to a team containing at least one employee of Rodeo FX.

Year	Nominated work	Award	For	Result
2007	The Golden Compass	VES Award	Outstanding Visual Effects in a Visual Effects-Driven Motion Picture	Nominated
2007	The Golden Compass	Academy Award	Best Visual Effects	Won
2008	The Golden Compass	BAFTA Award	Best Special Visual Effects	Won
2009	Indiana Jones and the Kingdom of the Crystal Skull	VES Award	Best Single Visual Effect of the Year (For "Valley Destruction")	Nominated
2009	Indiana Jones and the Kingdom of the Crystal Skull	VES Award	Outstanding Matte Paintings in a Feature Motion Picture	Nominated
2009	The Day the Earth Stood Still	VES Award	Best Single Visual Effect of the Year (For "Newborn Klaatu")	Nominated
2011	Rango	CFCA Award	Best Animated Film	Won
2011	Rango	Hollywood Film Award	Best Animation	Won
2011	Rango	LAFCA Award	Best Animated Film	Won
2011	Rango	NBR Award	Best Animated Film	Won
2011	Rango	SFFCC Award	Best Animated Feature	Won
2011	Rango	WAFCA Award	Best Animated Feature	Won
2012	Rango	Academy Award	Best Animated Feature	Won
2012	Rango	Annie Award	Best Animated Feature	Won
2012	Rango	BAFTA Award	Best Animated Film	Won
2012	Rango	VES Award	Outstanding Animation in an Animated Feature Motion Picture	Won
2012	Rango	Critics' Choice Award	Best Animated Feature	Won
2012	Rango	OFCS Award	Best Animated Film	Won
2012	Source Code	VES Award	Outstanding Supporting Visual Effects in a Feature Motion Picture	Nominated
2013	The Amazing Spider-Man	VES Award	Outstanding Virtual Cinematography in a Live Action Feature Motion Picture	Nominated
2013	Pacific Rim	Hollywood Film Award	Best Visual Effects	Won
2014	On/Off	Maverick Movie Award	Best VFX	Won
2014	Pacific Rim	BAFTA Award	Best Special Visual Effects	Nominated
2014	Pacific Rim	VES Award	Outstanding Visual Effects in an Effects Driven Feature Motion Picture	Nominated
2014	Pacific Rim	Annie Award	Outstanding Achievement, Animated Effects in a Live Action Production	Won
2014	Enemy	Canadian Screen Award	Achievement in Visual Effects	Nominated
2014	Game of Thrones	Creative Arts Emmy Award	Outstanding Special Visual Effects (Episode "The Children")	Won
2015	Game of Thrones	VES Award	Outstanding Visual Effects in a Visual Effects-Driven Photoreal/Live Action Broadcast Program (Episode "The Children")	Won
2015	Birdman	VES Award	Outstanding Supporting Visual Effects in a Feature Motion Picture	Won
2016	The Walk	VES Award	Outstanding Supporting Visual Effects in a Photoreal Feature	Nominated
2018	Game of Thrones	VES Award	Outstanding Effects Simulations in an Episode, Commercial, or Real-Time Project (Episode "The Dragon and The Wolf")	Won
