= Daniel Ferguson =

Daniel Ferguson is a filmmaker whose credits include Wired to Win: Surviving the Tour de France, Journey to Mecca: In the Footsteps of Ibn Battuta and Last of the Elephant Men.

== Career ==
Ferguson was line producer and script writer for the 2009 IMAX dramatised documentary Journey to Mecca: In the Footsteps of Ibn Battuta, produced by Cosmic Picture and SK Films, which won the Houston International Film Festival award for best short documentary in 2010 and, a year earlier in Paris, Le Prix Du Public Most Popular Film at Le Géode Film Festival. It also won a prize at the Tribeca Film Festival in New York City. The film tells the story of Ibn Battuta as he travelled to Mecca in the fourteenth century. Ferguson was co-writer and first assistant director on Wired to Win: Surviving the Tour de France which followed two riders on the hundredth anniversary of the contest and explored how the cyclists’ brains coped with the rigours of the race.

Other film credits include line producer on Roads to Mecca and Lost Worlds: Life in the Balanc, associate producer and line producer on Seducing Maarya, and assistant director on Schmooze. Ferguson was also director, writer and producer for the 3D IMAX film Jerusalem with George Duffield, Taran Davies and the late Jake Eberts. It is narrated by Benedict Cumberbatch and was released in 2013.
