= Pasquale Calabrese =

Italian neuroscientist

- Born: 27 February 1961 (age 65); Naples
- Citizenship: Italian
- Known for: diagnosis of neuropsychological and behavioral disturbances in neuropsychiatric patients, focus on multiple sclerosis, Parkinson's disease and Alzheimer's disease
- Awards: Lundbeck-Institute Teaching Award in neuropsychology and neuropsychometry of Old-Age-Psychiatry (2004/2006), German Brain Research Award in geriatrics (2011)
- Scientific career
- Fields: Neurology, Clinical neurology, Neurophysiology, Clinical neurophysiology, Neuroscience, Clinical neuroscience, Neuropsychology
- Workplaces: University of Basel

Pasquale Calabrese born 27 February 1961 in Naples, Italy, is an Italian professor of clinical neurosciences at the University of Basel, Faculty of Psychology, Department of Molecular and Cognitive Neurosciences. He is a neuroscientist, experimental neurologist and medical neuropsychologist.

== Biography ==
Calabrese received his academic formation in psychology, medicine, biology and philosophy at the University of Konstanz, University of Zurich, Ruhr University Bochum and at Bielefeld University from 1983 to 1989. He received a diploma in psychology at the University of Konstanz in 1991. He received his PhD in his major clinical neuropsychology and in his minor clinical neurology in 1997. In 1999 he was appointed guest professor in neurosciences at the International Institute of Genetics and Biophysics (IIGB) of the Italian Research Association. In 2004 Calabrese received his habilitation from the Faculty of Medicine of the University of Bochum and received the Venia legendi in Experimental Neurology and Medical Neuropsychology. From 1991 to 2008 he was Head of the Department of Neuropsychology and Behavioral Neurology and Director of the Memory Clinic at the University Hospital Bochum-Langendreer (Germany). From 2010 he worked in the same position at the Neurocenter Southern Switzerland, Lugano (Switzerland). Since 2011 he is titular-professor of clinical neuroscience at the University of Basel, where he also heads the Neuropsychology and Behavioral Neurology Unit at the Department of Molecular and Cognitive Neuroscience and Head of Neuropsychology at the University Hospital's MS Center. He also serves as a clinical neuropsychological expert for the Swiss Insurance Medicine and consulting clinical neuropsychologist at the department of Neurosurgery of the University of Basel where he is a member of the awake-craniotomy team.

== Clinical-scientific contribution ==
Calabrese's clinical research focus is in the field of diagnosis of neuropsychological and behavioral disturbances in neuropsychiatric patients, with a focus on Multiple Sclerosis, Parkinson's disease and Alzheimer's disease. He is involved in the conceptualization of clinical trails in the field of behavioral neurology and psychiatry.

In his single-case studies and essays he pursues an idiographic-constructivist-neuro-evolutive approach. During his training and affiliation in the lab of Hans Markowitsch, he was mainly involved in some fundamental clinical studies to investigate the functional neuroanatomical and neuropsychological correlates of retrograde amnesia after brain damage.

In addition, his clinical research area relates to the study of neuropsychiatric dysfunctions and quality of life in multiple sclerosis and other neuropsychiatric disorders Stress-related dysfunctions and also in patients with Parkinson's disease. Calabrese is co-developer of neuropsychological screening procedures and neuropsychometric test batteries that have found manyfold applications in clinical practice. His neuropsychometric oeuvre includes the development of clinical screening tools, such as the DemTect for the investigation of patients with dementia, MUSIC, a screening test for the detection of cognitive deficits in multiple sclerosis and the PANDA, a cognitive test for the detection of cognitive disorders in Parkinson's disease. He is also co-author of the German-language translation and validation of the revised Wechsler Memory Scale (WMS-R) for the detection of memory disorders in brain-damaged subjects. The neurobehavioral monitoring of patients with brain tumors during awake craniotomy and the expert assessment and assessment of damage-related behavioral changes are also part of his clinical specialty.

== Honors and awards ==
- September 2004: Lundbeck-Institute Teaching Award in neuropsychology and neuropsychometry of Old-Age-Psychiatry
- July 2006: Lundbeck-Institute Teaching Award in neurology and psychiatry
- July 2011: German Brain Research Award in geriatrics (together with E. Kalbe and J. Kessler, MPI of neurological research, Cologne) for the development of neuropsychological diagnostics in Dementia“

== Memberships ==
- Since 2013: President of the Teaching-Committee ”Neuropsychology and Psychotherapy in Multiple Sclerosis” of the Swiss Multiple Sclerosis Society (SMSG)
- Member of the Scientific Advisory Board of the German Society of Anti Aging and Preventive Medicine (GSAAM)
- Executive member of the Communication Committee of the European Academy of Neurology (EAN)
- Since 2013: Member of the Scientific Advisory Board and Member of the Scientific Committee of the Swiss MS Registry
- Since 2012: Member of the senate (Regenz) of the University of Basel

== Publications ==
- Pasquale Calabrese publication list PubMed
- Pasquale Calabrese publication list and citations in Google Scholar
