= Greta Scacchi =

Italian-born actress (born 1960)

Greta Scacchi OMRI
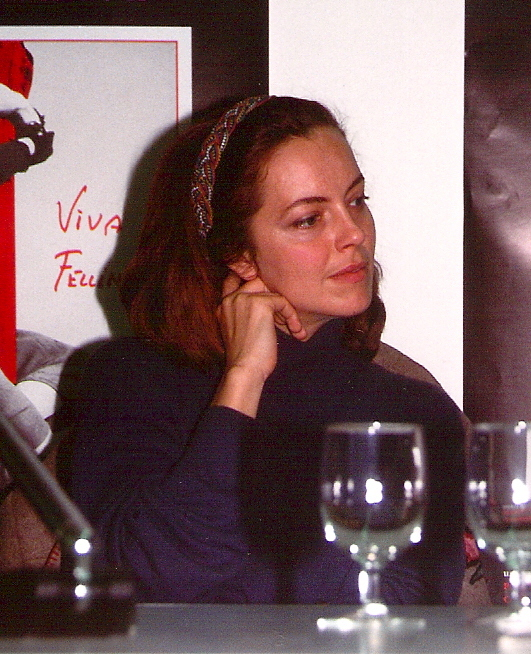
- Scacchi in 2008
- Born: 18 February 1960 (age 66); Milan, Lombardy, Italy
- Citizenship: Italy; Australia; United Kingdom
- Education: Bristol Old Vic Theatre School
- Occupation: Actress
- Years active: 1981–present
- Partners: Tim Finn (1983–1989); Vincent D'Onofrio (1989–1993); Carlo Mantegazza (1997–2010)
- Children: 2, including Leila George

Greta Scacchi (/ˈskæki/ SKAK-ee, Italian: [ˈɡrɛːta ˈskakki]; born 18 February 1960) is an actress. Born in Italy to a British-Italian couple, she was raised in Britain and finally settled in Australia, becoming a naturalized citizen in January 1995.

Scacchi had her first leading role in the romantic drama film Heat and Dust (1983), for which she received a BAFTA Award nomination. She subsequently played prominent roles in the films White Mischief (1987), Presumed Innocent (1990), The Player (1992), Emma (1996), and Looking for Alibrandi (2000).

== Early life and education ==
Greta Scacchi was born on 18 February 1960 in Milan, Italy, the daughter of an Italian father and English mother. Scacchi's parents divorced when she was four, and her mother returned to her native United Kingdom with Greta and her two older brothers, first to London, then to Haywards Heath, West Sussex.

In 1975, after Scacchi's mother's remarriage, the family moved to Perth, Western Australia, where her stepfather was a visiting professor at the University of Western Australia (UWA). While in Perth, Scacchi attended Hollywood Senior High School and joined UWA's University Dramatic Society, where she made her theatrical debut at the New Dolphin Theatre in Edward Bond's play Early Morning under director Arne Neeme.

In 1977, Scacchi returned to the United Kingdom to study at the Bristol Old Vic Theatre School.

== Career ==
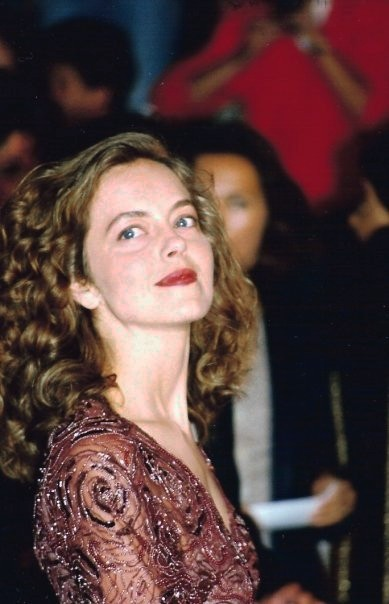
Scacchi at the 1994 Cannes Film Festival

Scacchi's first on-screen role was in the first season finale of Bergerac in 1981, when she played a model who was the girlfriend of an international criminal being pursued by the eponymous detective. The following year, she made her film debut in the German film Second Sight.

Scacchi's first leading role was in the British film Heat and Dust (1983), opposite Shashi Kapoor and Julie Christie; her performance earned a BAFTA nomination for Best Newcomer to Film. She went on to give performances in films such as The Ebony Tower (1984), The Coca-Cola Kid (1985), White Mischief (1987), Presumed Innocent (1990), The Player (1992) and Country Life (1994). She turned down the role of Catherine Trammell in Basic Instinct (1992). She later reflected on her early career: "It was very clear to me even then that I was always being invited to play a male fantasy. I had to work very hard to punch some integrity into the idea of being a woman when I was placed inside that male gaze."

In 1996, Scacchi won an Emmy Award for her portrayal of Alix of Hesse in the television film Rasputin: Dark Servant of Destiny, and was nominated for a Golden Globe and numerous other awards. In 1999, she had a role as an Italian-Australian single mother in the Australian film Looking for Alibrandi, a performance for which she won the 2000 AFI award for Best Supporting Actress.

In 2007, Scacchi received an Emmy Award nomination for Outstanding Supporting Actress in a Miniseries or a Movie for Broken Trail.

Scacchi is fluent in English, French, German, and Italian, which has made her a popular choice for European casting directors.

Scacchi has performed in a wide range of parts in theatre. She appeared In Times Like These (Bristol Old Vic) and Cider with Rosie (Phoenix Arts Theatre, Leicester) as her film career was taking off. After making four films in 15 months, in 1985 she appeared with Mark Rylance and Kevin McNally in Airbase (Oxford Playhouse and Arts Theatre). In Uncle Vanya at the Vaudeville Theatre, London, in 1987, she played opposite Michael Gambon and Jonathan Pryce. In 1991, she played Nora in Ibsen's A Doll's House in the Festival of Perth. A year later, she played the lead role in Strindberg's Miss Julie for the Sydney Theatre Company. She returned to Sydney in 1996 to play Cecilia in Sam Shepard's Simpatico. In 1999, she took the lead in Easy Virtue in Chichester, directed by actress Maria Aitken.

In 2001, Scacchi returned to Sydney for Harold Pinter's Old Times, directed by Aarne Neeme, playing Kate. In 2004, she toured Italy with an Italian production Vecchi Tempi of the same play, but this time playing Anne. In 2005, she performed at the Theatre Royal, Bath, in Thea Sharrock's production of Noël Coward's Private Lives. Back in Australia in 2008, she was nominated for a Sydney Theatre Best Actress Award for playing Queen Elizabeth in Schiller's Mary Stuart in Sydney. In that year, Scacchi also performed in Terence Rattigan's The Deep Blue Sea at the Theatre Royal, Bath, on tour and then in the West End back at the Vaudeville Theatre.

In 2010, Scacchi replaced an injured Kristin Scott Thomas in the Chatelet Theatre, Paris in the French premiere (37 years after it was written) of Stephen Sondheim's A Little Night Music. As Desiree she sang "Send In The Clowns".

In May 2011, Scacchi appeared alongside Anita Dobson in the play Bette and Joan at London's Arts Theatre, written by Anton Burge and directed by Bill Alexander, about the personal and professional relationship between Bette Davis and Joan Crawford. At the end of that year she appeared at the Ensemble Theatre, Sydney in David Williamson's new play, Nothing Personal.

In September 2013, Jonathan Miller directed a gala performance of William Shakespeare's King Lear at The Old Vic in London. Scacchi played Regan.

In 2014, Scacchi played Arkadina in Chekhov's The Seagull in Perth. In 2015, she joined the Headlong theatre company to star on a UK tour in Tennessee Williams' The Glass Menagerie as Amanda.

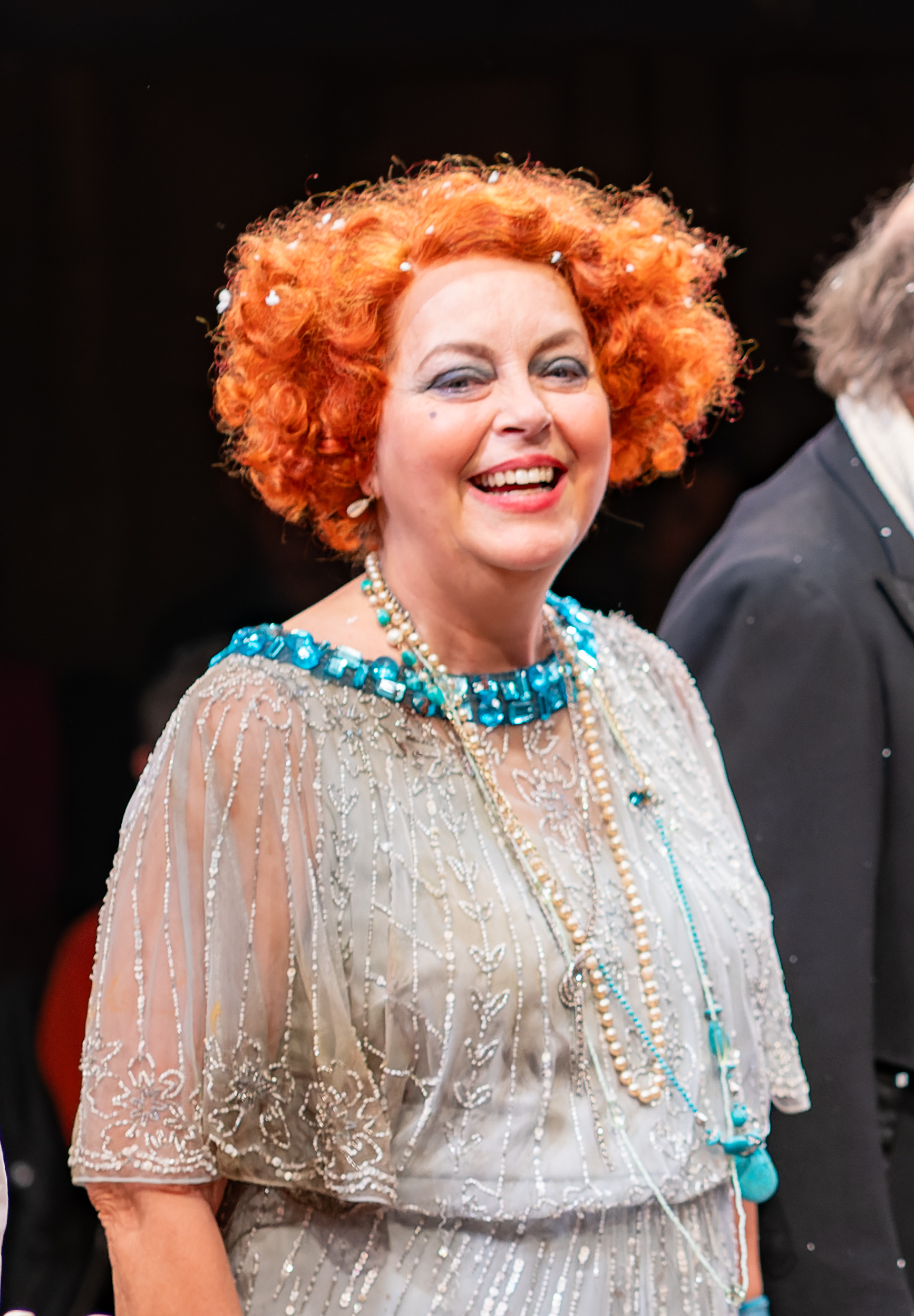
Scacchi as Mrs Hardcastle in a 2023 performance of She Stoops to Conquer

Between 20 August and 12 November 2016, Scacchi played Phoebe Rice opposite Kenneth Branagh's Archie Rice in a revival of John Osborne's The Entertainer at the Garrick Theatre in London's West End. The play received mixed reviews but hers were uniformly positive.

In June 2024, Scacchi returned to the role of Joan in Darby and Joan after the show was renewed for a second series.

== Recognition and honours ==
Scacchi was nominated for a BAFTA Award for Most Promising Newcomer to Leading Film Roles for Heat and Dust in 1983.

She won a Primetime Emmy Award for Outstanding Supporting Actress in a Limited or Anthology Series or Movie and was nominated for a Golden Globe Award for her portrayal of Alix of Hesse in the biographical television film Rasputin: Dark Servant of Destiny in 1996.

She received another Primetime Emmy Award nomination for her performance in the Western television film Broken Trail (2006).

In October 2013, Scacchi was awarded the Cavaliere Ordine al Merito della Repubblica Italiana (Knight in the Order of Merit of the Italian Republic) for her services to the arts.

== Personal life ==
Scacchi is an Italian citizen by birth. She applied for British citizenship after turning 18, but was refused, and again refused on appeal; she later applied again due to Brexit. In 1995, Scacchi became a Australian citizen. She is a citizen of Italy, Australia, and the United Kingdom.

From 1983 to 1989, Scacchi was in a relationship with New Zealand musician Tim Finn. She had a four-year relationship with American actor Vincent D'Onofrio, with whom she has a daughter, actress Leila George. She was previously the mother-in-law of actor Sean Penn, who was married to George from 2020 to 2022.

In 1997, Scacchi began a relationship with her first cousin, Carlo Mantegazza. They have a son.

Scacchi is an active supporter of campaigns and organisations that promote environmental causes. She has supported Greenpeace and Christian Aid's climate change campaign. In 2009, she posed nude with a codfish to promote the documentary The End of the Line, a film exposing the effects of overfishing. She continues to lead the linked Fishlove campaign, which has seen a host of well known actors pose for photographs with a variety of fish.

== Filmography ==
=== Film ===
Year	Title	Role	Notes
1982	Second Sight	Anna	
1983	Heat and Dust	Olivia Rivers	Nominated—BAFTA Award for Best Newcomer to Film
1983	Dead on Time	Pretty Girl	Short film
1984	The Ebony Tower	Diana / "The Mouse"	TV film
1984	Camille	Marguerite Gautier	TV film
1985	Defence of the Realm	Nina Beckman	Feature film
1985	Burke & Wills	Julia Matthews	Feature film
1985	Doctor Fischer of Geneva	Anna-Luise Fischer	TV film
1985	The Coca-Cola Kid	Terri	Feature film
1987	White Mischief	Lady Diana Broughton	Feature film
1987	Good Morning, Babylon	Edna Bonnano	Feature film
1987	A Man in Love	Jane Steiner	Feature film
1988	Young Distance (aka La Donna della Luna)	Angela	Feature film
1988	Love and Fear (aka Three Sisters, the original title is Paura e amore)	Maria	Feature film
1990	Presumed Innocent	Carolyn Polhemus	Feature film
1991	Shattered	Judith Merrick	Feature film
1992	Fires Within	Isabel	Feature film
1992	Salt on Our Skin	George McEwan	Feature film
1992	The Player	June Gudmundsdottir	Feature film
1992	Turtle Beach	Judith	Feature film
1994	Country Life	Deborah Voysey	Feature film
1994	The Browning Version	Laura Crocker-Harris	Feature film
1995	Jefferson in Paris	Maria Cosway	Feature film
1996	Emma	Anne Taylor Weston	Feature film
1996	Così	Mental Patient (uncredited)	Feature film
1996	Rasputin: Dark Servant of Destiny	Alexandra of Hesse	TV film Primetime Emmy Award for Outstanding Supporting Actress in a Miniseries or a Movie; Nominated—Golden Globe Award for Best Supporting Actress – Series, Miniseries or Television Film; Nominated—Satellite Award for Best Supporting Actress – Series, Miniseries or Television Film
1997	The Serpent's Kiss	Juliana	Feature film
1998	Love and Rage	Agnes MacDonnell	Feature film
1998	The Red Violin	Victoria Byrd	Feature film
1998	Macbeth	Lady Macbeth	TV film
1999	Ladies Room	Lucia	
1999	Cotton Mary	Lily MacIntosh	Feature film
1999	Tom's Midnight Garden	Aunt Gwen Kitson	Feature film
1999	The Manor	Mrs Ravenscroft	
1999	Looking for Alibrandi	Christina Alibrandi	Feature film Australian Film Institute Award for Best Actress in a Supporting Role; Film Critics Circle of Australia Award for Best Supporting Actress
2000	One of the Hollywood Ten	Gale Sondergaard	Biopic
2001	Festival in Cannes	Alice Palmer	
2002	Jeffrey Archer: The Truth	Margaret Thatcher	TV film
2003	Baltic Storm	Julia Reuter	Feature film
2004	Strange Crime	Nicoletta	Feature film
2004	Beyond the Sea	Mary Douvan	Feature film
2005	Flightplan	Dr Lisa, The Therapist	Feature film
2006	The Book of Revelation	Isabel	Feature film
2006	Icicle Melt		Short film
2006	The Handyman	Julia Parchant	Short film
2007	Hidden Love	Dr. Dubois	Feature film
2008	Brideshead Revisited	Cara	Feature film
2008	Shoot on Sight	Susan Ali	Feature film
2008	Miss Austen Regrets	Cassandra Austen	TV film
2010	Un altro mondo	Cristina	
2010	Way to Live Forever	Private Instructor	Feature film
2011	Hindenburg: The Last Flight	Helen Van Zandt	TV film
2014	The Falling	Miss Mantel	Feature film
2017	La Tenerezza	Aurora	Feature film
2017	The Girl in the Fog	Beatrice Lehman	Italian: La Ragazza Nella Nebbia
2018	Operation Finale	Vera Eichmann	Feature film
2018	Amanda	Alison	Feature film
2019	Palm Beach	Charlotte	Feature film
2019	Waiting for the Barbarians	Mai	Feature film
2021	Shepherd	Glenys Black	Feature film
2023	Run Rabbit Run	Joan	Feature film
2023	I Told You So (Te l’avevo detto)	Frances	

=== Television ===
Year	Title	Role	Notes
1981	Bergerac	Annie	TV series, season 1, episode 10: "The Hood and the Harlequin"
1983	The Mike Walsh Show	Guest - Herself	TV series, 1 episode
1984	Waterfront	Anna Cheri	TV miniseries, 3 episodes
1995	Good Morning Australia	Guest	TV series, 1 episode
1995	Denton	Guest	TV series, 1 episode
1995	Ernie and Denise	Guest	TV series, 1 episode
1995	Midday	Guest	TV series, 1 episode
1997	The Odyssey	Penelope	TV miniseries Nominated—Satellite Award for Best Actress – Miniseries or Television Film
2001	The Farm	Liz Cooper	TV miniseries, 4 episodes
2002	Daniel Deronda	Lydia Glasher	TV series
2005	Il Commissario Maigret		Italian TV production
2005	Two Twisted	Dr Adele Partridge	TV series, episode: Heart Attack
2006	Broken Trail	Nola Johns	TV miniseries Nominated—Primetime Emmy Award for Outstanding Supporting Actress in a Miniseries or a Movie; Nominated—Screen Actors Guild Award for Outstanding Performance by a Female Actor in a Miniseries or Television Movie
2006	Agatha Christie's Marple	Tuppence	TV series, episode: "By the Pricking of My Thumbs"
2006	Two Twisted	Adele Partridge	TV series
2006	Nightmares & Dreamscapes: From the Stories of Stephen King	Katie Arlen	TV miniseries, episode: "Autopsy Room Four"
2008	The Trojan Horse	Helen Madigan	TV miniseries, 2 episodes
2013	Agatha Christie's Poirot	Mrs Burton-Cox	TV series, episode: "Elephants Can Remember"
2013	Masterpieces Unveiled	Presenter	TV documentary series, 8 episodes
2015	A.D. The Bible Continues	Mother Mary	TV series, 4 episodes
2016	War & Peace	Countess Rostova	TV series, 6 episodes
2017	Versailles	Madeleine de Foix	TV series, season 2
2017	The Terror	Lady Jane Franklin	TV series (based on the Dan Simmons novel of the same name)
2022-2025	Darby & Joan	Joan Kirkhope	TV series
2023	Bodies	Polly Harker	TV limited series, 8 episodes

=== Radio ===
Year	Title	Role	Notes
1989	The Skull Beneath The Skin	Cordelia Grey	Radio play of P D James novel. Scacchi's radio debut.

== Theatre ==
Year	Title	Role	Notes
1976	Early Morning	Florence Nightingale	Edward Bond's play at Dolphin Theatre, Perth
1981	Cider With Rosie	Rosie & other parts	Phoenix, Leicester
1985	In Times Like These	Vivien Mercer	Bristol Old Vic, Bristol
1985	Airbase	Lt. Madeline Kohler	Oxford Playhouse and Arts Theatre, London
1987	Uncle Vanya	Yelena	Vaudeville Theatre, London
1991	A Doll's House	Nora	The Hole in the Wall Theatre Company, Perth
1992	Miss Julie	Miss Julie	Sydney Theatre Company
1996	Simpatico	Cecilia	Sydney Theatre Company
1999	Easy Virtue	Larita	Chichester, England
2001	Old Times	Kate	Sydney Theatre Company
2004	Vecchi Tempi	Anne	Italian tour of Harold Pinter play
2005	Private Lives	Amanda	Theatre Royal, Bath
2008	Mary Stuart	Queen Elizabeth	Sydney Theatre Company
2008	The Deep Blue Sea	Hester	Theatre Royal, Bath; Vaudeville, London
2010	A Little Night Music	Desiree	Théâtre du Châtelet, Paris. French premiere
2011	Bette and Joan	Bette Davis	Arts Theatre, London and tour
2013	King Lear	Regan	The Old Vic, London
2014	The Seagull	Madame Arkadina	Black Swan Theatre, Perth
2015	The Glass Menagerie	Amanda	Headlong/West Yorkshire Playhouse/Liverpool Playhouse co-production
2016	The Entertainer	Phoebe Rice	The Garrick Theatre, London
