= Unknown White Male =

- Promotional poster
- Directed by: Rupert Murray
- Produced by: Beadie Finzi; Jess Search (executive); Stephen Laughton (associate)
- Starring: Doug Bruce
- Cinematography: Lance Bangs; Orlando Stuart
- Music by: Mukul
- Distributed by: Wellspring Media
- Release dates: January 2005 (Sundance); February 24, 2006 (United States); April 7, 2006 (United Kingdom)
- Running time: 88 minutes
- Countries: United States; United Kingdom
- Language: English
- Budget: £1 million

Unknown White Male is a 2005 documentary film directed by Rupert Murray, covering the life of his childhood friend Doug Bruce, a British resident of New York who appeared to suffer from sudden amnesia, who woke up on a subway train in Coney Island in 2003, not knowing who or where he was.

The film premiered at the Sundance Film Festival 2005. It was nominated for a British Independent Film Award, a Grierson and a Directors Guild of America award. It was also shortlisted for a Grierson and an Academy Award. It was theatrically released in the US by Wellspring and shown on Court TV. In the UK it was released by Shooting People, the filmmakers community whose members made the film and shown on Channel 4 TV who had commissioned the film originally.

During the film, medical experts opine that Bruce is suffering from a syndrome called retrograde amnesia, a form of amnesia where the sufferer cannot recall events from before the onset of the amnesia, although it remains unclear how or whether Bruce suffered a trauma which caused the amnesia.

== Amnesia hoax theory ==
The authenticity of the film has been questioned by some critics, who allege that it is an elaborate fraud. The filmmakers have consistently denied this allegation. Roger Ebert, film critic for the Chicago Sun-Times, initially said he found the documentary "faintly fishy", but after meeting the filmmakers subsequently wrote that he was "convinced of its truthfulness".

Objections to Bruce's claims include:

- Although the documentary presents Bruce's condition as standard retrograde amnesia, this condition typically lasts a few hours or days at most, not years. The Washington Post consulted Hans Markowitsch, a neuropsychologist and professor at the Bielefeld University in Germany and a specialist on total retrograde amnesia. "To Markowitsch, the absence of any plausible trigger makes Bruce's story more than just suspicious. "Total retrograde amnesia doesn't happen out of nothing," he says. "I can't imagine that this story is true." The same article states, "A leading amnesia expert believes Bruce's story is without medical precedent."
- During an early interview, Bruce noted that it was raining the day he first walked into the police department to report his amnesia. "A couple days later, while sitting in his apartment and being interviewed, he says that he'd taken a walk a day earlier and seen a breathtaking summer storm. "It was the first time," he mutters, choking up, "that I had ever seen rain."" Retrograde amnesia would not account for this additional post-episode memory loss.
- Previous to Bruce waking up with amnesia and no identification, one of his best friends in Paris had an accident while playing soccer, sustained a head injury, and woke up with amnesia and no identification. The amnesia was caused by visible head trauma and lasted only a week. "Bruce says the friend set aside his hard-charging business career and moved to either Bali or Thailand, where he learned to give massages. "And now he heals people," Bruce whispers."

The film makers address the hoax theory with a six-minute-long DVD feature titled, "Questions With The Director & Producer." It opens with a written message responding to the allegations of a hoax with: "We, the film makers, Douglas, his friends and family categorically deny this claim." Director Rupert Murray states that he finds it shocking when people believe the film to be fake, because it raises the question "Is my life a fake?" Of Bruce, he admits, "He coincidentally happened to film himself [thus providing footage used in the documentary], which people find strange." Producer Beadie Finzi explains her belief in Bruce's amnesia with, "The bottom line is that anyone and everyone who has ever known Douglas, [his] friends and family, is completely convinced that this traumatic event did indeed happen to him. And indeed, every physician that has treated him is also convinced that this has happened to him."
