= Vivien Duffield =

English philanthropist

Dame Vivien Duffield DBE
- Born: Vivien Louise Clore; 26 March 1946 (age 80)
- Education: Lycée Français; Heathfield St Mary's School; Lady Margaret Hall, Oxford
- Occupation: Philanthropist
- Spouse: John Duffield (div. 1976)
- Children: 2, including George Duffield
- Parent(s): Sir Charles Clore; Francine Halphen
- Relatives: Natasha Wightman (daughter-in-law)

Dame Vivien Louise Duffield, DBE (née Clore; born 26 March 1946) is an English philanthropist.

== Life and career ==
Vivien Louise Clore was born to Jewish parents. Her father was millionaire businessman and philanthropist Sir Charles Clore and her mother was Francine Halphen, a heroine of the French resistance.

She was educated at the Lycée Français, Heathfield School and Lady Margaret Hall, Oxford University where she read modern languages. She has a brother, Alan Evelyn Clore. Her marriage to British financier John Duffield produced two children, Arabella and George. The marriage ended in divorce in 1976. From 1973 until 2005, she was in a relationship with Sir Jocelyn Stevens, who was managing director of Express Newspapers and Chairman of English Heritage.

== Philanthropy ==
After her father's death in 1979, Duffield assumed the Chairmanship of the Clore Foundations in the UK and in Israel. In the UK she also established her own Vivien Duffield Foundation in 1987, and the two foundations merged in 2000 to become the Clore Duffield Foundation. In addition to the Chairmanship of her Foundation, Dame Vivien was a member of the Board of the Royal Opera House from 1990 to 2001 and is currently Chairman of the Royal Opera House Endowment Fund. She founded Eureka! The National Children's Museum in Halifax, West Yorkshire in 1992, and is the life president.

She is a Director of the Southbank Centre board and a Governor of the Royal Ballet. From 2007 to 2010 she was Chair of The Campaign for Oxford, Oxford University. She is the founder of JW3, London's new Jewish Community Centre, which opened on the Finchley Road in October 2013. She is Chairman of the Clore Foundation in Israel.

A 2005 London Evening Standard article estimated that she and the Foundations she controls had donated in excess of £176 million. In March 2011, amid heavy Government cuts on the arts, she donated £8.2 million for educational purposes to 11 arts institutions. Following her departure from the board of the Royal Opera House, Covent Garden, Duffield subsequently donated £1M to the re-development of the London Coliseum.

== Honours ==
Dame Vivien Duffield's charitable work has been formally acknowledged by many institutions, both in the UK and in Israel. She was appointed a CBE in 1989, promoted to DBE in 2000 and in 2008 The Prince of Wales presented Dame Vivien with one of the first Medals for Arts Philanthropy. The Medal celebrates individuals who support the arts and recognises the contribution of the most inspiring philanthropists in the UK. In 2006, she was awarded the Beacon Fellowship Prize. In February 2013 she was assessed as one of the 100 most powerful women in the UK by Woman's Hour on BBC Radio 4. In 2017 she was appointed an Honorary Fellow of the Royal College of Art.
