= Bruce Douglas =

Bruce Douglas may refer to:

- Bruce Douglas (basketball) (born 1964), American basketball player
- Bruce Douglas (rugby union) (born 1980), Scottish rugby union player
- Bruce L. Douglas (1925–2025), American politician in the state of Illinois

== See also ==
- Bruce Douglas-Mann (1927–2000), British politician
- Douglas Bruce (disambiguation)
- Douglas (surname)
