= Fishlove =

Photographic campaign to end unsustainable fishing

- Formation: 1 June 2009; 17 years ago
- Founder: Greta Scacchi and Nicholas Röhl

Fishlove is a global photographic campaign that seeks to end unsustainable fishing. The campaign was established in 2009 by actress Greta Scacchi and Brighton restaurant-owner Nicholas Röhl, initially to launch the documentary adaption of The End of the Line.

The annual photographs feature celebrities modelling nude, posing with dead endangered sealife as censor bars, to highlight issues around the sourcing and consumption of sealife. The campaign raises awareness of illegal fishing and pollution, and the preservation of marine life through reforms addressing deep-sea bottom trawling or fishing. It also aims to reduce the pressure on popular fish such as cod, and instead encourage consumption of sprats, herring, mackerel and gurnard. The campaign's first photograph featured Scacchi covering her chest with an Icelandic cod, and the concept was inspired by an image of a naked woman holding a fish by the advertising agency Leo Burnett.

Co-founder Röhl's Brighton sushi restaurant, Moshimo, serves only sustainable fish, and was a contributing factor for the city of Brighton being shortlisted for Sustainable Fish City status. The restaurant funds the studio and make-up costs of the campaign through their paid membership scheme.

Röhl attributed the campaign's success to the depiction of fish as creatures needing love and protection, rather than as foodstuffs, and as a "...wake-up call to the world..." to end over-fishing and the reduction of fish stocks.

== Campaign impact ==
The Fishlove campaign has been considered a success as Rankin's photographs resulted in coverage of fish conservation across international news outlets.

Bonham Carter's photograph has been credited as contributing towards government policy, with chancellor George Osborne's agreement to create a marine-life reserve around the Pitcairn Islands.

It also influenced the reform of the Common Fisheries Policy.

=== Controversy and criticisms ===
In 2015, a seafood supermarket in Kyiv, Ukraine, misused some of the FishLove images in an advertising campaign.

The campaign has been compared as a 'piscine version' of PeTA's "I'd Rather Go Naked Than Wear Fur" campaign, and has been criticised as an attention-seeking use of nudity in a lazy and ubiquitous fashion and its effectiveness has been questioned.

== Featured models ==
Models have included journalists Mariella Frostrup and Eleanor Mills, actors Sean Mathias, Arthur Darvill, Lily Loveless, Felicity Dean, Nickolas Grace, Cordelia Bugeja, Wolf Kahler, Greta Bellamacina, Thekla Reuten, Allan Corduner, Eileen Atkins, Christopher Biggins, Mélanie Laurent, Freddie Fox, Jean-Marc Barr, Richard E. Grant, Emilia Fox, Ben Kingsley, Ben Lawson, Haydn Gwynne, Tom Bateman, Chipo Chung, Joseph Millson, Jeany Spark, Jerry Hall, Elizabeth Jagger, Josh Brolin, Helena Bonham Carter, Fiona Shaw, Vicky Krieps, Caroline Ducey, Mélanie Bernier, Barbara Cabrita, Julie Christie, Zoë Wanamaker, Judi Dench, Gillian Anderson, Tara Fitzgerald, Zoë Tapper, Michael Gambon, Tanja Jess, Pip Pellens, Simon Callow, Dakota Blue Richards, Asli Bayram, Miriam Margolyes, Emily Beecham, Olivia Williams, Leila George, Sean Pertwee, Mark Rylance, Dougray Scott, Alex Jennings, Hugh Bonneville, Tamla Kari, Trevor Laird, Jodhi May, Emma Thompson, Rula Lenska, Nicolas Bro, Iben Hjejle, Thure Lindhardt, Trine Dyrholm, Natalie Madueño, Lars Brygmann, Imelda Staunton, Eve Best, Jessie Buckley, Tom Wlaschiha, Jane Horrocks, Gina Bramhill, Maimie McCoy, Jai Courtney, Lincoln Younes, Benno Furmann, Nina Hoss, Rutger Hauer, Christiane Paul, Aure Atika, Cressida Bonas, Elizabeth McGovern, Sean Penn, Florence Keith-Roace, models Paris Jackson and Jade Parfitt, writer Kathy Lette, dart-player Bobby George, dancers Steven McRae, Edward Watson, Gary Avis, swimmer Mark Foster, chef Tom Aikens, directors Serge Hazanavicius and Steven Berkoff, fashion designers Kenzo Takada and Stephen Webster, musicians Thomas Dutronc, Steven Isserlis, Goldie, businessman Richard Branson and comedians Ade Edmundson and Lenny Henry.

The 60lb giant tuna from Bonham Carter's photoshoot was donated to Islington charity, Shelter From The Storm, to feed homeless people, and the fish from other photoshoots are generally not procured specifically for that purpose, and are also donated for consumption.

Dench posed with a lobster to highlight increasing ocean acidification, which results in the changing health of lobster populations.

=== Photographers ===
In 2012, Rankin's photographs were exhibited at Pertwee, Anderson & Gold gallery in Soho, London, coinciding with the OCEAN2012 campaign against over-fishing. The logo and poster for the campaign were designed by Studio Am of Brighton. Fishlove photographs were also displayed at the Baudoin Lebon gallery in 2013. Other photographers have included fashion photographer Alan Gelati, Denis Rouvre, royal portraitist John Swannell and Jillian Edelstein.

== See also ==
- Sustainable fishery
