= Natasha Wightman =

English actress

- Born: 1973 (age 52–53)
- Occupation: Actress
- Years active: 1999–2006, 2018–present
- Known for: Gosford Park; V for Vendetta

Natasha Wightman (born 1973) is an English actress who appeared in British and American films and British television productions from 1999 until 2005. Productions in which she has co-starred include Gosford Park (2001), Revelation (2001), Mouth to Mouth (2005), and V for Vendetta (2006). She also appeared in several episodes of the British TV serial State of Play.

== Career ==
In 1999, Wightman starred in the British films The Feather Room and Romeo Thinks Again, with the latter production featuring Wightman as Juliet. In 2001, Wightman co-starred in the mystery film Gosford Park directed by Robert Altman. She portrayed Lady Lavinia, the sister of Kristin Scott Thomas's character and the wife of Lt. Commander Anthony Meredith (played by Tom Hollander). That year, Wightman also appeared in Revelation alongside James D'Arcy and Terence Stamp. Directed and written by Stuart Urban, the British adventure film features a team searching for an ancient relic once possessed by the Knights Templar. Wightman plays Mira, an alchemist.

In 2003, Wightman acted in several episodes of the British TV serial State of Play. The 2005 British film Mouth to Mouth, directed by Alison Murray, includes Wightman as Rose, the incompetent mother of the protagonist Sherry (played by Elliot Page).

The following year, Wightman appeared in the dystopian political thriller V for Vendetta as Valerie Page. Her character is a lesbian who is imprisoned by the totalitarian regime due to her sexual orientation. The actress stated that during Valerie's incarceration, "She finds something, her integrity, which they can't take from her. She'd almost died and then come alive again through what she found in herself." Wightman shaved her head for the role, and felt this decision helped display prejudice faced by many lesbians. During this period, Wightman's neighbour called the police after assuming the actress was a man trying to break into her house. Slant Magazine praised Wightman's performance and voiceover work in the film, believing she "greatly helped" turn the prison scenes "into something poetic".

== Personal life ==
Wightman is married to film-maker George Duffield.

== Work ==
Film and television

- V for Vendetta (2006) .... Valerie
- The Rope (2005) .... Woman tied to man
- Mouth to Mouth (2005) .... Rose
- The Trouble with Love (2003) .... Rosamond Lehmann
- State of Play (2003) (TV) .... Sheena Gough (2 episodes)
- Shoreditch (2003) .... Masie Hickman
- Skydance, rendezvous à Paris (2002) .... Carole
- Mexicano (2002) .... Katherine
- Pas de Trois (2002) .... Sophie
- Gosford Park (2001) .... Lady Lavinia Meredith
- Revelation (2001) .... Mira
- Murder on the Orient Express (2001) (TV) .... Mary Debenham
- Romeo Thinks Again (1999) .... Juliet
- The Feather Room (1999).... Nina

Stage

- As You Like It (Soho Theatre Group) .... Rosalind
- Blithe Spirit (Tristan Bates Theatre) .... Ruth
- La Ronde (Southwark Playhouse) .... Young Miss
- Richard III (Rose Theatre) .... Lady Anne
