= Murder on the Orient Express (2001 film) =

2001 American television film

- Based on: Murder on the Orient Express by Agatha Christie
- Screenplay by: Stephen Harrigan
- Directed by: Carl Schenkel
- Starring: Alfred Molina; Meredith Baxter; Leslie Caron; Peter Strauss
- Composer: Christopher Franke
- Countries of origin: United States; United Kingdom; Germany
- Original language: English

Production
- Producer: Marion Rosenberg
- Cinematography: Rex Maidment
- Editor: Henk Van Eeghen
- Running time: 100 minutes
- Production companies: Agatha Christie Ltd. CBS

Original release
- Network: CBS; Sky Movies; ITV
- Release: April 22, 2001

Murder on the Orient Express is a 2001 made-for-television mystery film directed by Carl Schenkel based on the 1934 novel Murder on the Orient Express by Agatha Christie, featuring Hercule Poirot. This version is set in the present day and has a smaller cast than the novel. The screenplay was written by Stephen Harrigan and the original music score was composed by Christopher Franke.

== Plot ==
Hercule Poirot is travelling on the Orient Express. While on the journey, Poirot meets a very close friend, Wolfgang Bouc, who works for the Compagnie Internationale des Wagons-Lits. The train is stopped when a landslide blocks the line on the second night out from Istanbul, and American millionaire Samuel Edward Ratchett is found stabbed to death the next morning.

Since no footprints are visible around the train and the doors to the other cars were locked, it seems that the murderer must still be among the passengers in Ratchett's car. Poirot and Bouc work together to solve the case. They are aided by Pierre Michel, the middle-aged French conductor of the car.

A key to the solution is Ratchett's revealed involvement in the Armstrong tragedy in the United States several years earlier, in which a baby was kidnapped and then murdered. (The fictitious Armstrong case was inspired by the real-life kidnapping of Charles Lindbergh's baby boy.)

== Cast ==
- Alfred Molina as Hercule Poirot
- Meredith Baxter as Mrs. Caroline Hubbard
- Leslie Caron as Sra. Nina Alvarado
- Amira Casar as Helena von Strauss
- Nicolas Chagrin as Pierre Michel
- Tasha de Vasconcelos as Vera Rossakoff
- David Hunt as Bob Arbuthnot
- Adam James as William MacQueen
- Dylan Smith as Tony Foscarelli
- Peter Strauss as Mr. Samuel Ratchett
- Fritz Wepper as Wolfgang Bouc
- Kai Wiesinger as Philip von Strauss
- Natasha Wightman as Mary Debenham

== Background ==
Burt Reynolds, Judi Dench, Lauren Bacall, Claire Bloom, Charlotte Rampling, and Sophia Loren were all originally believed to have been cast in the film. At least a dozen members of Keighley Playhouse in Keighley were extras on the film, and provided their own costumes.

== Filming and production ==
Filming started on 6 February 2001 in Leeds. A replica of an Orient Express buffet car was built at Horsforth's newly opened Transformer Studios, where the majority of the filming took place. Filming also took place in Kingston upon Hull, Bury, and Istanbul.

== See also ==
- Murder on the Orient Express is a 1974 film with Albert Finney as Poirot.
- In December 2010, the series Agatha Christie's Poirot, featuring David Suchet as Poirot, aired "Murder on the Orient Express".
- In November 2017, a new film adaptation of Murder on the Orient Express starring Kenneth Branagh as Poirot was released.
