= Revelation (2001 film) =

2001 British film by Stuart Urban

- Directed by: Stuart Urban
- Written by: Stuart Urban
- Starring: Natasha Wightman; James D'Arcy; Udo Kier; Terence Stamp; Liam Cunningham
- Cinematography: Sam McCurdy
- Release date: 2001
- Running time: 111 minutes
- Country: United Kingdom
- Language: English

Revelation is a 2001 British supernatural thriller film directed by Stuart Urban and starring James D'Arcy, Natasha Wightman, Udo Kier and Terence Stamp. It tells the story of the final search for an ancient relic known as the Loculus, dating back to 50 AD, and the relic's effect on the Martel family and the world.

== Plot ==
In two flashbacks, a relic is created in 50 AD, then hidden by Jews from a Crusader mob in medieval Rennes-le-Château. In present-day Rennes-le-Château, an academic under instructions from Magnus Martel is seen with the relic—the Loculus—researching on the ground to find the right place to hide it. Magnus' son Jake, an ace cryptographer, is released from Wormwood Scrubs Prison and recruited by his father for research on the Loculus. Magnus reveals that the Loculus relates to the Knights Templar and its sinister successor organisation known as "the Order", and in secret receives calls from this organisation threatening him if he does not accelerate his research, in spite of this, Magnus realises the Loculus' massive power for good or evil and has hidden it to ensure it does not fall into the Order's hands. After breaking a code on the Loculus to reveal the word "palingenesis,” Jake hides whilst members of the organization kill and flay his father. Jake then flees with another researcher on the project, an occultist named Mira, and seeks help from the Roman Catholic priest Father Ray Connolly.

The trail takes the three characters to (among others) a Cambridge library to research Isaac Newton's involvement in attempting to unlock the Loculus and to Rennes-le-Château and its Tour Magdala. They discover that the Loculus is related to Christian eschatology and has been hidden on Patmos, writing-place of John's Book of Revelation. Father Connolly stays behind in London as backup while Mira and Jake go to Patmos and find the Loculus hidden in a crypt beneath a Greek Orthodox church and former temple to Mary Magdalene as Aphrodite. Using the reflective properties of a hermaphrodite symbol on the Loculus, they reveal a hexagram built into the floor, an occult symbol. Jake and Mira disrobe and make love within the symbol in an attempt to unlock it, experiencing a vision of themselves as Christ and Mary Magdalene before fleeing into the crypt when they hear a pursuer approaching.

The pursuer turns out to in fact be Father Connolly and together they finally work out the Loculus' meaning—its significance in fact lies in the four nails holding it together, which are those used to crucify Christ and retain organic matter with his DNA, preserved in a ceremony on Mount Hebron. The Templars and the Order have continually attempted to use the DNA on it to resurrect Christ (including one failed attempt by Newton), but have failed until the genetic advances of the present day. The three argue as to what to do with the discovery—Jake concurs with his dead father and wishes to destroy it to keep it out of the Order's hands, whilst Ray wishes to take it to a trustworthy African cardinal at the Vatican. Ray prevails and traps the other two, but on arrival in Rome the Order's Grand Master seizes the Loculus, puts Ray under torture and sends troops to kill Mira and Jake. The couple manage to flood the chambers with sand to kill the troops and the church's monks are alerted to the couple's plight by an emergency postcard sent by Connolly before his departure, but only Mira manages to escape—Jake is fatally buried. In the meantime the Grand Master has cloned Christ and had him not only proclaimed the Messiah by the Vatican but put under his own tutelage and control, so that he can brutalize him and rule the world through him. The film closes with Mira realising that she (Magdalene's descendant) has given birth to a child by a Martel (Christ's descendant via the Merovingian dynasty) and that she must keep him secret from the order (as predicted by Revelation 12.4) so as to oppose the Grand Master's puppet Christ.

== Cast ==
- Natasha Wightman as Mira
- Udo Kier as The Grand Master
- Diran Meghreblian as Craftsman
- David Urban as Child with Loculus
- Uri Roodner as Jewish Alchemist
- Coryse Borg as Jewish Alchemist's Daughter
- Manuel Cauchi as Mob Priest
- Anna Beck as Jewish Alchemist's Wife
- Heathcote Williams as New Age Man
- Terence Stamp as Magnus, Lord Martel
- Ben Feitelson as Tour Guide at Rennes le Chateau
- James D'Arcy as Jake Martel
- Joe Johnson as Young Jake Martel
- Alan Talbot as Limo Driver
- Celia Imrie as Harriet Martel, Jake's mother
- Derek Jacobi as Librarian
- Mark Dymond as Backpacker in Malta
- Pip Torrens as Prof. Claxton
- Nicolas Chagrin as Pompous Academic
- Ron Moody as Sir Isaac Newton
- Miles E. Gregius as Knight Commander
- Oliver Ford Davies as Prof. Casaubon
- Charlotte Weston as Lord Martel's PA
- Paul Birchard as General Demolay, NSA Director
- Chris Rogers as Newsreader
- Robert Hudson as Director, Serious Fraud Office
- Mark Heenehan as Gen. Demolay's Aide
- Liam Cunningham as Father Ray Connolly
- Jean-Marc Perret as Newton's Acolyte
- Vernon Dobtcheff as Curé at Rennes-le-Chateau
- Nicholas Murchie as Biotechnologist
- Earl Cameron as Cardinal Chisamba
- Joseph Long as Brigadiere
- Massimo Marinoni as Police Torturer
- Danica Bezanov as TV Reporter
- Andreas Markos as Abbot at Patmos Monastery
- Sidney Kean as Europolitician
- Lolly Susi as American Politician
- Vicky Paritoglou as Greek Orthodox Nun

== Locations ==
Much of the film is shot on location, including in Malta.

== Awards ==
Nominated for "Best Film" (2001) in the Sitges – Catalan International Film Festival.

== Reception ==
Overall reception was negative. The Guardian, for example, noted the film's "rag-bag of extraordinary cameos" but criticised the "vulgar heresies" on which it was based and likened the "significant, ritual sex with a beautiful alchemist" with the "clean-limbed young hero" to an Occult-based sketch in Not the Nine O'Clock News. The Observer wrote of the film as "ludicrous", a "farrago", "straight-faced" and "the fag end of a millennial cycle of apocalyptic pictures".
