= Taran Davies =

American film producer

Taran Davies is a film producer and director best known for his documentary film Afghan Stories (2002), and the IMAX feature documentary Journey to Mecca (2009).

== Life and education ==
Davies was born in New York City and raised in London and Hong Kong. He graduated from Harvard University in 1993 with a BA in English and American Literature, and studied documentary filmmaking with Richard Rogers, Director of the Film Study Center at the Department of Visual and Environmental Film Studies at Harvard.

== Career ==
Davies founded Wicklow Films in 1994 to produce, direct, and write a series of films about the Islamic world. Three - Afghan Stories, Mountain Men and Holy Wars, and The Land Beyond the River - were broadcast on the Sundance Channel in March 2003 with its FilmFest Portraits of Islam.

The Land Beyond the River (1998) documents his journey through Central Asia in 1995. It was broadcast by PBS in November 1997 and was shot entirely on Hi 8.

Davies travelled to the Caucasus in the summer of 1999 to film Mountain Men and Holy Wars.

The September 11 attacks marked a turning point for Davies. Having witnessed the collapse of the World Trade Center, he gave up his job in finance to set out to make Afghan Stories and commit to making films that might shed light on conflict and its causes and effects. Afghan Stories premiered at the Venice Film Festival in September 2002, and was described as “a brilliant portrait” by The Rough Guide to Cult Movies. The New York Times called it “invaluable”

Davies founded Cosmic Picture in 2004 with Dominic Cunningham-Reid to produce giant screen productions to enhance people's knowledge of history, religion, culture, and geography.

He conceived the IMAX film Journey to Mecca and developed it with Cunningham-Reid, Executive Producer Jake Eberts, and Director Bruce Neibaur. Journey to Mecca was released in January 2009 in Abu Dhabi on the world's largest outdoor screen, specifically constructed for the occasion. Produced by Cosmic Picture and SK Films and distributed by SK Films and National Geographic, Journey to Mecca tells the story of one of the greatest travelers in history, Ibn Battuta, and his journey to Mecca in the 14th century. Journey to Mecca contains the first IMAX material ever filmed of the Hajj, one of the longest running annual events in history

Davies also produced and directed, with Ghasem Ebrahimian, Roads to Mecca, the story of the making of Journey to Mecca.

In 2009 Davies started work on the IMAX film Jerusalem with Daniel Ferguson (writer, director, producer), George Duffield (producer) and Jake Eberts (executive producer). The film, narrated by Benedict Cumberbatch, focuses on the cultural, political and religious importance of Jerusalem and was released in 2013.

== Other ==
Davies is a member of the Explorers' Club. He directed and produced his first film, Around the Sacred Sea, in 1993; the film documents a five-month horseback expedition around Siberia's Lake Baikal, the world's largest freshwater lake.
