= Blue Marine Foundation =

Marine conservation organisation

- Formation: 2010; 16 years ago
- Founder: Chris Gorell Barnes and Charles Clover
- Headquarters: London
- Website: https://www.bluemarinefoundation.com/

Blue Marine Foundation (stylised as Blue Marine) is a marine conservation organisation. It was founded as a legacy project following the 2009 documentary film The End of the Line. It has been involved in establishing marine reserves in Lyme Bay, Turneffe Atoll and 4 million square kilometres of protection in the UK Overseas Territories.

== History ==
Chris Gorell Barnes, the executive producer of the documentary film The End of the Line, co-founded the Blue Marine Foundation with Charles Clover (the author of the book The End of the Line), and filmmaker George Duffield, as a legacy project of the film. It was formed with the aim of fixing environmental issues impacting the oceans.

Blue Marine Foundation secured funding to enforce the protection of the no-take marine reserve created by the UK government around the Chagos Archipelago in the Indian Ocean. At the time of its creation in 2010, it was the world's largest marine reserve. The Bertarelli Foundation funded the first five years, after which the government promised to internalise the costs and enforce the reserve. Henry Bellingham, a UK junior Foreign Office minister, described the initiative as a "great example" of government and the private sector working together and said the reserve would "double the global coverage of the world's oceans benefiting from full protection".

In July 2012, the charity helped start an alliance between fishermen and conservationists in the UK. This alliance was designed to protect Lyme Bay, a reef habitat on the southern coast of the UK. Scallopers and dredgers were banned from part of the bay, but overfishing continued. The deal brokered by Blue Marine and the Lyme Bay Working Group is designed to ensure fishing communities can continue to fish while the fragile ecosystem is protected and conserved.

The charity also played a central role in the creation of a marine reserve around the Turneffe Atoll, which is part of the Belize Barrier Reef. This project was completed in partnership with local fishermen and organizations and the Government of Belize. The Bertarelli Foundation also provided funding.

Blue Marine was a founder member of the Great Blue Ocean coalition, of six NGOs that in 2017 campaigned for the UK Government to establish the Blue Belt Programme widely recognised as one of the world's leading marine conservation initiatives. Ten of the 16 UK Overseas Territories today participate in the programme, in partnership with local communities, the UK Government and NGOs, protecting more than 4.3 million square kilometres of ocean, an area more than 20 times the size of Great Britain. The Programme is highly ecologically representative with protected areas in the Pacific, Atlantic, Southern and Indian oceans and the Caribbean.

Blue Belt Programme Marine Protected Areas (MPAs) are monitored using satellite technology including Global Fishing Watch and OceanMind, and enforced via coordination between the UK Marine Management Organisation, INTERPOL and other international agencies.

Duran Duran lead singer Simon Le Bon become an Ambassador for the Blue Marine Foundation in 2016 after his affinity for the sea.

In 2022, the organisation was part of a restoration project launched in the Solent, the Solent Seascape Project. In the same year, it partnered with Convex Insurance and University of Exeter to launch a global survey to assess carbon captured and stored in the seabed of the continental shelves, the Convex Seascape Survey.

In 2023 the charity declared its intention to take the UK government to court for enabling decades of overfishing in UK waters.
