= Coryse Borg =

Maltese actress, director and writer

Coryse Borg is a Maltese actress, director and SEO content writer, resident in Malta. She appeared in a range of productions, both in the theatre and in the movies. She currently works as an SEO content writer and also provides writing, voice over, proofreading and hosting services through her venture SayIt.

She appeared in Gladiator, Helen of Troy and Revelation. She also has played various parts both in comedies and straight theatrical productions, including Shakespeare and musicals. In 2007 she starred in the Malta Arts Festival production of A Midsummer Nights' Dream, produced by the Malta Council for Culture and the Arts. Other Maltese stage roles included: Sylvia in Life x 3, As You Like It, West Side Story and Jack and the Beanstalk.

She played "Sharon" in the TV series Dejjem Tiegħek Becky. She also took part in Malta George Cross, a film on which Borg worked with the assistance of students at the San Andrea School, won Best Screenplay by the Jury of the Documentary and Fiction Festival of Hollywood in 2007.

She has written for a number of productions and is a radio show host who has interviewed journalists and authors like Helen o'Hara and Ramona Depares.

Her directing credits include Glorious, the story of Florence Foster Jenkins, and a production of Audacity,
