= Mouth to Mouth (2005 British film) =

- Movie poster
- Directed by: Alison Murray
- Written by: Alison Murray
- Produced by: Anne Beresford; Judy Tossell
- Starring: Elliot Page (Note: Credited as Ellen Page)
- Cinematography: Barry Stone
- Edited by: Christian Lonk
- Music by: Rowan Oliver
- Production company: Hellhound Pictures
- Distributed by: Artistic License
- Release dates: June 2005 (Brooklyn International Film Festival); 11 November 2005 (Canada); 19 May 2008 (United Kingdom)
- Running time: 101 minutes
- Countries: United Kingdom; Portugal; Germany; Canada
- Language: English

Mouth to Mouth is a 2005 drama film starring Elliot Page. It is the first feature film written and directed by Canadian-born Alison Murray. It was shot on location in England, France, Germany and Portugal.

== Plot ==
Sherry, a disillusioned American teen living on the streets of Europe, happens across the street collective S*P*A*R*K (Street People Armed with Radical Knowledge), led by Harry and immediately follows suit, joining their caravan of orphans, runaways, deadbeats, and punks on a journey around Europe, recruiting new fragile souls. Along the way, a child member of the group, Manson, is accidentally killed when he jumps into a garbage dumpster and hits an artery and his friend Mad Ax becomes heavily depressed. While intoxicated, Sherry calls her mother, Rose, much to Harry's anger.

Later, at a bacchanal with a bonfire, Nancy takes drugs, triggering an asthma attack that's treated by her inhaler. Sherry mentally replaces an idyll lover's face with Harry's, which disturbs her and she departs. As Sherry hitchhikes away, Rose sees her and picks her up. Tensions arise between them on the drive and Sherry gets out of the car and returns on foot to the S*P*A*R*K group, where several of the female and male members have shaved their heads and have new rules such as no sex or drugs and alcohol.

Rose soon finds her and inexplicably wants to join S*P*A*R*K. She is initiated into the group after selling her house in Lisbon and donating the proceedings to S*P*A*R*K, and she too has her head shaved. After getting half her hair shaved off, Sherry feels that she's unwanted there by Harry and tells him about it. He then kisses her, they have sex, after which he abandons and then publicly shames her. The rest of her hair is shaved and Sherry begins to see that Harry is psychologically abusing the entire group.

S*P*A*R*K member Nancy propositions Sherry to leave the group and Sherry agrees. When Harry confronts Nancy, she says 'We only wanted to have some fun', accidentally implicating someone else. Harry thinks that Ax is the second person, but Sherry steps forward and tells everyone that it was her idea, because whatever good was once in S*P*A*R*K is now gone. Harry throws Sherry and Nancy into a well. Nancy begins to have a panic attack which triggers her asthma and Sherry screams for help, but everyone ignores them. Ax eventually reels Sherry and Nancy up from the well, but Nancy is already dead. Sherry and Ax (with a few others following them) escape the camp, hitchhiking once again.

== Cast ==
- Elliot Page as Sherry Green
- Natasha Wightman as Rose
- Beatrice Brown as Nancy
- Maxwell McCabe-Lokos as Mad Ax
- Eric Thal as Harry
- August Diehl as Tiger
- Diana Greenwood as Dog
- Jim Sturgess as Red

== Reception ==
On the review aggregator website Rotten Tomatoes, 54% of 28 critics' reviews are positive. The website's consensus reads: "Writer-director Alison Murray has a clear connection to the story, but Mouth to Mouth is too disjointed and thinly sketched to satisfy." Metacritic, which uses a weighted average, assigned the film a score of 47 out of 100, based on 10 critics, indicating "mixed or average" reviews.

=== Accolades ===
The film won the Grand Chameleon award at the 2005 Brooklyn International Film Festival, and three prizes at the 2007 Annonay International Festival of First Films: Grand Jury, Jury Lycéens (Highschool Students Jury) and Best Music.
