= George Duffield (film-maker) =

British photographer and filmmaker

George Duffield is a British marine conservationist, film producer and wildlife photographer. He is best known for the documentary film The End of the Line and is a co-founder of the marine charity, the Blue Marine Foundation and a co-founder of Ocean 14 Capital.

== Life and education ==
Duffield is the son of Dame Vivien Duffield (née Clore), the British-Jewish philanthropist, and the financier John Duffield. He graduated from Harvard University. He is married to actress Natasha Wightman.

He is the grandson of Sears plc founder Charles Clore

== Career ==
Duffield co-founded Arcane Films with Meg Thomson. Among the company's most successful films was the documentary The End of the Line which changed the attitudes of individuals and companies such as Pret a Manger and Marks & Spencer. The End of the Line was inspired by the book The End of the Line: How Overfishing Is Changing the World and What We Eat by Charles Clover, the journalist and columnist. The documentary followed him as he investigated how overfishing is having a dramatic effect on the number, quantity and types of fish in the seas. It was described by the Chicago Tribune as "an apocalyptic documentary that is as beautiful as it is damning".

In 2011 the low-budget film won the inaugural Puma Creative Impact for its success in changing consumer behaviour. A study by the Channel 4 Britdoc Foundation found that it had been seen by more than 1 million people and had created press and media attention worth more than £4 million. Among the places it has been screened are 10 Downing Street, the United Nations General Assembly, and the International Commission for the Conservation of Atlantic Tunas.

He produced the 3D IMAX film Jerusalem with Daniel Ferguson (Writer, director, Producer), Taran Davies (Producer) and Jake Eberts (Executive Producer). The film is narrated by Benedict Cumberbatch and focuses on the cultural, political and religious importance of Jerusalem. It was released in 2013.

Other films produced by Duffield include the 2009 documentary Wild Art: Olly & Suzi that was made for the BBC and is about two contemporary artists – Olly Williams and Suzi Winstanley – who travel the world to meet and paint predators in their natural environment, often at risk to themselves. He also produced Dot the i starring Gael García Bernal which was premiered at the 2003 Sundance Film Festival and won the 2003 Deauville Film Festival Audience Award.

Duffield is on the board of trustees of the Grierson Trust which promotes documentary film-making and celebrates the work of John Grierson.

Aside from documentary films, Duffield is a wildlife photographer. In 2005 he won the Underwater Worlds category of the Veolia Environnement Wildlife Photographer of the Year.

== Blue Marine Foundation ==
George Duffield and Chris Gorell Barnes, the executive producer of The End of the Line, co-founded the Blue Marine Foundation as a legacy project of the film. It was formed with the aim of fixing what it describes as "the largest solvable problem on the planet – the crisis in the oceans".

== Personal life ==
George Duffield is married to actress Natasha Wightman.
