= Douglas Bruce (disambiguation) =

Douglas Bruce (born 1949) is an American activist for limited government, lower taxes, fully informed jurists, amid other causes.

Douglas Bruce or Doug Bruce may also refer to:

- Doug Bruce (born 1967), English-American photographer, subject of the 2005 documentary Unknown White Male
- Doug Bruce (rugby union) (born 1947), New Zealand rugby union player

== See also ==
- Sir Douglas Bruce Bruce-Gardner, 2nd Baronet (1917–1997), of the Bruce-Gardner baronets
- Bruce (surname)
