= Doug Bruce =

English-American photographer (born 1967)

Doug Bruce (born 1967) is an English-American photographer. He is the subject of Rupert Murray's 2005 documentary film Unknown White Male.

Bruce claims to suffer from an extremely rare, and possibly purely psychological, form of retrograde amnesia. In the film, Bruce alleges that suddenly one day, the entire episodic memory bank of his entire life went missing. According to Bruce, he first became aware that he "didn't know who [he] was," when he had "awakened" on a New York City Subway train, with no recollection of who he was, including his name, life experiences, family, friends, home, and work. After the incident that led to the amnesia, he went to the police station but since they didn't know what to do with him, he was admitted to a hospital psychiatric ward, where, with no name to use, 'Unknown White Male' was written on his hospital medical charts and records.

== Hospital stay ==
After a few days in the hospital, a phone number was found hidden inside a Spanish phrase book in the bag he had been carrying. Little else was found on him other than some dog medicine; he had no wallet, bank cards, or other identifying documents. The phone number was that of the mother of a girl, Nadine Abramson, whom he had tried to court. Abramson went to the hospital and identified him as 'Doug Bruce', a prosperous Englishman who had formerly been a successful banker in Paris, and who was studying for a degree in photography at the School of Visual Arts in New York City.

== Hoax suspicions ==
Due to the extreme rarity of Bruce's form of amnesia, the length of it (Bruce has not regained his memory and therefore is a medical anomaly), as well as myriad inconsistencies in his story, there have been claims that the film is a hoax. The filmmakers and subject deny this. Various publications discussed the improbability of Bruce's story, which centers around being the only documented example of extended, full-blown amnesia in the world to date (aside from Benjaman Kyle). Others concentrate on dissecting the various incongruent statements Bruce has made regarding his alleged trauma. Bruce reveals in an interview that, before his own bout with amnesia, a close friend suffered from short-term amnesia after a sporting accident; this experience inspired the friend to change his life completely and move to Bali to become "a healer". It has been speculated that this friend's experience with amnesia inspired Bruce's malingering.

According to filmmaker Rupert Murray, his documentary Unknown White Male is about the phenomenon of amnesia from the perspective of an amnesiac, and it includes video film footage which Bruce filmed himself beginning within a week of the start of his amnesia.
