= Alison Murray (director) =

Canadian film director

Alison Fairweather Murray is a Canadian director of films, documentaries and music videos. She is well-known for writing and directing Mouth to Mouth (2005) starring Elliot Page, and documentaries such as Carny (2008) and Train on the Brain (2000).

== Early life ==
Murray was born in Nova Scotia, Canada and ran away to London when she was 15. She studied theatre writing, dance and choreography before completing a M.A. in Film Direction at the Royal College of Art (1995).

== Career ==
Murray has been making short films since Kissy Suzuki Suck (1992), with commissions for BBC television as well as European broadcasts and an international tour compiled by the Centre Georges Pompidou in Paris. Her work has been presented alongside that of Harmony Korine, Paul Thomas Anderson, Michel Gondry and Atom Egoyan (executive producer of Mouth to Mouth) in "RET. INEVITABLE" at Brooklyn Bridge Anchorage – an event billed as "screening today's most important visualists". The Institute of Contemporary Arts in London has presented a retrospective of her short films, also shown at the Tate Gallery and Toronto's Royal Cinema. Between 1996 and 2002, she directed over twenty music videos for British pop acts such as The Sugababes, Busted, and B*Witched, and was nominated for a CAD award for Best New Director in 1997, and for Best Pop Video in 2003.

Many of her films incorporate her approach to dance, and in 1995, she received a Paul Hamlyn Award for Choreography. She has choreographed and directed two films for the BBC's Dance for the Camera series.

In 2000, she completed Train on the Brain, an hour long documentary for Channel 4 and TVOntario in which she rode the rails across North America, armed with a DV and Super 8 camera. In 2003, Alison collaborated with London based rapper Jonzi D to make Aeroplane Man, a film adaptation of Jonzi D's hit theatre show of the same name. Mouth to Mouth is her first feature film as a writer and director, premiered at the San Francisco International Film Festival and went on to win Best Feature Prizes at the Brooklyn International Film Festival, Berlin's Britspotting Festival, and Festival D'Annonay, France.

She produced and directed a documentary about Carnys that was broadcast on the Sundance Channel, Channel 4 and TVOntario. It premiered at the Hot Docs Festival in Toronto and won Diane Seligman Award for Best Documentary in the Brooklyn International Film Festival in 2008. Her feature documentary Caprichosos de San Telmo (2011), which she shot on location in Buenos Aires, premiered at the Toronto International Film Festival.

As of 2020, Murray is working on a new fictional feature film called The Vegas, developed with The Film Farm and co-produced with JA Productions and Cepa Cine.

=== Themes ===
Murray's films show her interest in subcultures. In her dramatic feature Mouth to Mouth, a teenager who runs away from home and ends up in a European youth cult. Train on the Brain chronicles the lives of teenage hobos. Carny looks into the private lives of carnival workers.

== Personal life ==
Murray is a dancer and teacher of Argentine tango. She and her husband Carlos Boeri won First Place at the Campeonato Metropolitano de Baile de Tango de Buenos Aires in 2014.
