= Rupert Murray =

British film director

Rupert Murray (born 28 May 1969) is a film director working in London. Murray began by making television documentaries for Channel Four's Cutting Edge series including Playing For England and Seconds To Impact (cameraman and editor), and short films Outsiders and This Was My War, co-directed with Beadie Finzi.

In 2005 he directed British documentary film Unknown White Male, the story of an Englishman Doug Bruce living in New York who experienced retrograde amnesia. The film premiered at Sundance and was nominated for a Grierson award, a British Independent Film Award and a Directors Guild of America award.

The film was greeted with some scepticism from film critics in the USA on release, several of whom believed it was an elaborate hoax. The filmmakers have consistently rejected this allegation. Influential film critic Roger Ebert of the Chicago Sun-Times said that he was "convinced of its truthfulness".

In 2007 he directed Wild Art: Olly and Suzi for BBC Storyville.

Murray also directed The End of The Line, a documentary about the effects of overfishing. The film was shown at Sundance 2009 and has resulted in major retailers changing their fish sourcing policy.

He also worked on a film about climate change deniers for the BBC.
