= Jake Eberts =

Canadian film producer (1941-2012)

Jake Eberts OC
- Born: John David Eberts; July 10, 1941; Montreal, Quebec, Canada
- Died: September 6, 2012 (aged 71); Montreal, Quebec, Canada
- Spouse(s): Fiona (24 February 1968 – 6 September 2012; his death; 3 children)

Jake Eberts, OC (July 10, 1941 – September 6, 2012) was a Canadian film producer, executive and financier. He is known for his work on Academy Award-winning titles Chariots of Fire (1981, uncredited), Gandhi (1982), Dances with Wolves (1990), and the successful animated feature Chicken Run (2000). According to Filmink magazine "he was responsible for some of the greatest British films of all time."

== Life and career ==
Eberts was born John David Eberts in Montreal, Quebec, Canada, the son of Elizabeth (MacDougall), an interior decorator, and Edmond Eberts, who worked for an aluminum manufacturer. Eberts grew up in Montreal and Arvida. He attended Bishop's College School in Lennoxville, Quebec and graduated from McGill University (Bachelor of Chemical Engineering 1962) and Harvard Business School (MBA 1966). Eberts' working career began as a start-up engineer for L'Air Liquide in Spain, Italy, Germany and France. He then spent three years as a Wall Street investor, including working at Laird Incorporated. He moved to London, England in 1971, where he joined Oppenheimer & Co., rising to the position of managing director of the UK brokerage and investment company in 1976.

=== With Goldcrest Films ===
With no apparent prior interest in film, about 1977 he turned to film financing, and joined David Puttnam in founding Goldcrest Films, an independent film production company, for which he served as president and CEO. The company's venture was the animated movie Watership Down.

While with Goldcrest in 1979, he made a disastrous personal investment of US$750,000 in Zulu Dawn, which took him almost a decade to recover from. He learned a great deal from this setback, as the output of the company was for the most part exceptional and financially rewarding, with such other films to its credit as The Howling, Chariots of Fire, Local Hero, Gandhi, The Killing Fields and The Dresser. Chariots of Fire and Gandhi won back-to-back Oscars in 1981 and 1982 respectively, and in the period from 1977 to 1983 the company's films received 30 Oscar nominations and won 15. He developed a reputation as an astute and shrewd financier. Rather than seek new talent, he chose to support established directors such as Sir Richard Attenborough, Roland Joffé, Jean-Jacques Annaud, John Boorman, many of whom would work with him on other pictures.

He resigned from the company in 1984, but returned a year later to attempt to rescue it financially. From its early success of just a few years earlier, when it was seen as a possible saviour of the British film industry, the company had been brought to the brink of bankruptcy by the failure of three high-budget films – Revolution, The Mission and Absolute Beginners, all in 1985–1986.

Eberts continued on until 1987 when he resigned for the last time. The company continued under new ownership. Eberts detailed the disaster in his 1990 memoir, My Indecision Is Final: The Spectacular Rise and Fall of Goldcrest Films, co-authored with Terry Ilott.

=== As an independent ===
Meanwhile, in 1985 he founded Allied Filmmakers with Jean Gontier, and became an affiliate of Pathé. With this company, in 1986 he made his debut as executive producer for Annaud's The Name of the Rose, based on the best-selling novel by Umberto Eco. He later produced or executive produced John Boorman's Hope and Glory, his second pair of back-to-back Oscar winners Driving Miss Daisy and Dances with Wolves; Robert Redford's A River Runs Through It and Henry Selick's adaptation of Roald Dahl's James and the Giant Peach. During this period Eberts was also responsible as executive for the expensive flop, The Adventures of Baron Munchausen, which went on to some popular success in home videocassette and DVD rentals.

Eberts moved to Paris in 1991.

Dances with Wolves was an early picture of Eberts to feature a Native American theme. Later productions included (as producer or executive producer), Bruce Beresford's Black Robe (1991), The Education of Little Tree (1997), and Richard Attenborough's Grey Owl (1999). The latter three pictures were all produced in Canada.

He also served as a co-executive producer, with Jeffrey Katzenberg, of Chicken Run. Other animated films Eberts produced include The Nutcracker Prince (1990), The Princess and the Cobbler, James and the Giant Peach, Doogal and Renaissance, and The Illusionist.

=== National Geographic Feature Films ===
In 2002, Eberts became chairman of National Geographic Feature Films (NGFF) and executive produced such titles as the live-action animal feature, Two Brothers by Jean-Jacques Annaud. He also branched out into documentaries including Prisoner of Paradise, which was nominated for Best Picture in the feature documentary category at the 2003 Academy Awards, and America's Heart and Soul (2004). Under his direction, NGFF had an enormous success in 2005 by distributing the sleeper documentary March of the Penguins (original French title, La Marche de l'empereur) and worked again with the Chariots of Fire director Hugh Hudson on a nature epic to be shot in Canada.

His final project, Jerusalem, still in production at the time of his death, was an Imax 3D production released in 2013. Directed by Daniel Ferguson it chronicles a day in the life of three teenagers, a Jew, a Muslim and a Christian, in the Holy City. Eberts had also been developing The Last Empress, a $60 million joint Sino-American venture about the ruthless Empress Dowager Cixi, who effectively controlled the Qing dynasty in the late 19th century.

== Honours and other achievements ==
In 1992 Eberts was made an Officer of the Order of Canada. He was also awarded honorary doctorates by McGill University in 1998 and by Bishop's University in 1999. He served on the board of the Sundance Institute and the Sundance Channel. He was also co-founder and CEO of MPI International, which provides high-speed, two-way video transmission capabilities to telcos, cable companies, hotels, hospitals, and schools.

By 2005, Eberts had been associated with films garnering 66 Oscar nominations, including nine for Best Picture. In 2006, March of the Penguins won the Oscar for Best Documentary.

In Bishop's College School, the tennis court is named "Jake and Fiona Eberts Memorial Tennis Court".

== Death ==
Eberts was diagnosed in late 2010 with uveal melanoma, a rare cancer of the eye, which spread to his liver. He died at the age of 71 in Montreal on September 6, 2012.

== Filmography ==
He was a producer in all films unless otherwise noted.

=== Film ===
Year	Film	Credit	Notes
1978	Watership Down	Executive producer	Uncredited
1981	Chariots of Fire	Executive producer	Uncredited
1981	Escape from New York	Executive producer	Uncredited
1982	Pink Floyd – The Wall	Executive producer	Uncredited
1982	The Plague Dogs	Executive producer	Uncredited
1982	Gandhi	Executive producer	Uncredited
1984	This Is Spinal Tap	Executive producer	Uncredited
1984	Another Country	Executive producer	Uncredited
1984	The Killing Fields	Executive producer	Uncredited
1985	A Room with a View	Executive producer	Uncredited
1986	The Name of the Rose	Executive producer	
1987	Hope and Glory	Executive producer	
1988	Me and Him	Associate producer	
1988	The Adventures of Baron Munchausen	Executive producer	
1989	Last Exit to Brooklyn	Associate producer	
1989	Driving Miss Daisy	Co-executive producer	
1990	Texasville	Executive producer	
1990	Dances with Wolves	Executive producer	
1990	The Nutcracker Prince	Executive producer	
1991	Black Robe	Executive producer	
1992	City of Joy		
1992	A River Runs Through It	Executive producer	
1993	Super Mario Bros.		
1993	The Thief and the Cobbler	Executive producer	
1994	No Escape	Executive producer	
1996	James and the Giant Peach	Executive producer	
1996	The Wind in the Willows		
1997	The Education of Little Tree		
1999	Grey Owl		
2000	Chicken Run	Executive producer	
2000	The Legend of Bagger Vance		
2003	Open Range		
2004	Two Brothers		
2005	The Magic Roundabout	Executive producer	
2006	Renaissance	Executive producer	
2007	Whatever Lola Wants		
2009	Journey to Mecca	Executive producer	
2010	The Illusionist	Executive producer	
2010	The Way Back	Executive producer	Final film as a producer
2015	A Walk in the Woods	Executive producer	Posthumous release

Thanks

Year	Film	Role
1985	The Emerald Forest	Thanks
2002	K-19: The Widowmaker	The producers wish to thank
2011	Hugo	Thanks
2014	The Journey Home	In memory of
2015	A Walk in the Woods	In memory of
2015	The Little Prince	In memory of

=== Television ===
Year	Title	Credit	Notes	Other notes
1982	P'tang, Yang, Kipperbang	Executive producer	Uncredited	Television film
2001	Snow in August			Television film
2006	Skyland	Associate producer		
2011−12	Iron Man: Armored Adventures	Associate producer Executive producer		

Thanks

Year	Title	Role	Notes
2011	Kingdom of the Oceans	Special thanks	Documentary

== See also ==
- List of Bishop's College School alumni
