= Chris Gorell Barnes =

English digital entrepreneur and marine conservationist

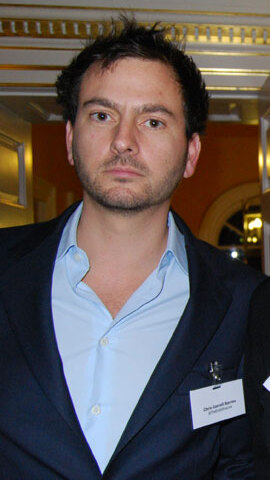
Barnes in 2009

Christopher Michael Jack Gorell Barnes (born May 1974) is an English digital entrepreneur and marine conservationist best known as executive producer of the documentary The End of the Line.

== Early life ==
Gorell Barnes was born to Henry Gorell Barnes (1939-1983), merchant banker and a director of Morgan Grenfell, and Gillian (née Carruthers), a family therapist at the Tavistock Clinic. His maternal grandmother was film editor Lito Carruthers. His paternal grandfather was Sir William Lethbridge Gorell Barnes (1909-1987), a War Cabinet official later of the Treasury and Colonial Office (where he was Deputy Under Secretary of State from 1959 to 1963), and who had been Personal Assistant to Prime Minister Clement Attlee from 1946 to 1948.

Gorell Barnes was raised in Maida Vale, and studied at Bedales and the European Business School at Regent's University London.

== Career ==
Gorell Barnes founded a digital content agency called Adjust Your Set in 2008. In 2009, Gorell Barnes was an executive producer for the documentary film The End of the Line.

He was named by the London Evening Standard newspaper in 2013 as one of the most powerful 'Tech Stars' in the UK. Gorell Barnes has sat on the board of Eagle Eye Solutions, a digital consumerism business, since 2007.

== Marine conservation ==
In 2009, Gorell Barnes and fellow producer George Duffield founded a marine conservation charity, the Blue Marine Foundation, which aims to create marine reserves. In 2010 it brokered a deal that created a huge marine reserve around the Chagos Islands and two years later one that protected the waters around Turneffe Atoll in the Caribbean.

== Personal life ==
Gorell Barnes lives in London with his long-term partner Martha Lane Fox, Baroness Lane-Fox of Soho. Their identical twin sons were born in 2016.
