= Jerusalem (2013 film) =

- Film poster
- Directed by: Daniel Ferguson
- Written by: Daniel Ferguson
- Produced by: Jake Eberts; Taran Davies; George Duffield; Daniel Ferguson
- Narrated by: Benedict Cumberbatch
- Cinematography: Reed Smoot
- Edited by: Jean-Marie Drot; Bob Eisenhardt; Doug O'Connor
- Music by: Michael Brook
- Production companies: Cosmic Picture; Arcane Pictures
- Distributed by: National Geographic Entertainment
- Release date: September 20, 2013
- Running time: 45 minutes
- Countries: United States; United Kingdom
- Language: English
- Box office: $8 million

Jerusalem is a 2013 documentary film about the ancient city of Jerusalem. It was produced by Cosmic Picture and Arcane Pictures and distributed by National Geographic Cinema Ventures in IMAX and giant screen theatres.

== Background and film synopsis ==
The film is narrated by Benedict Cumberbatch. It had a US$8 million production budget and some of the profits from the distribution of the film are to be given to projects in the city that promote co-existence.

A stated aim of the 45-minute film is to show the diversity of Jerusalem and to promote understanding of the different cultures in Jerusalem.

The film-makers were given special access to holy sites and several of the little-known parts of the city. They were permitted to film aerial shots of areas normally treated as no-fly zones. The filmmakers formed an advisory panel that includes academic and theological experts. Jerusalem presents the city through the eyes of three teenagers – a Jew, Christian and Muslim - and the archaeologist Dr Jodi Magness, of the University of North Carolina at Chapel Hill. The teenagers are Farah Ammouri, Nadia Tadros, and Revital Zacharie. The film shows how the teenagers live in Jerusalem, where they go and how the city is important to them. Dr Magness uses archaeology to understand the past in Jerusalem.

== Production ==
Jerusalem was a joint production between Cosmic Picture based in New York City, United States, and Arcane Pictures based in London, United Kingdom. Jake Eberts was the executive producer until his death in September 2012. He described the city of Jerusalem as, "The beating heart of our world today." Jerusalem was produced by Taran Davies and George Duffield. Daniel Ferguson was producer, writer and director. Dominic Cunningham Reid is also an executive producer. The Director of Photography was Reed Smoot.

== Reviews ==
The Washington Post described the panoramic photography as "at once awe-inspiring and intimate" and said watching the film "may be as close as a person can get to praying at the Church of the Holy Sepulchre, the Al-Aqsa Mosque and the Western Wall, without actually going there". It was described by NBC as "an eye-popping travelogue", and "sure to enthral and educate" in The Washington Times.
