= Hans Markowitsch =

Hans Joachim Markowitsch (born 26 March 1949 in Singen, Germany) is a physiological psychologist and neuropsychologist whose work centers on brain correlates of memory and memory disorders, stress, emotion, empathy, theory of mind, violent and anti-social behavior and consciousness.

Hans J. Markowitsch studied psychology and biology at the University of Konstanz, had professorships in biopsychology and physiological psychology at the Universities of Konstanz, Bochum, and Bielefeld, and was appointed professor of psychology and neuroscience at universities in Australia and Canada. In his research, he dealt with the neural and psychological foundations of memory and memory disorders and interactions between memory, emotion and consciousness. He is author, co-author or publisher of around 30 books and has written about 700 scientific articles and book chapters.

Hans J. Markowitsch was honored for "Best Contribution to Memory Research" by the International Neuropsychological Association, Dublin, in 2005 and with the Memory Award in 2000.

== Academia ==
For many years, he was co-director of the Center for Interdisciplinary Research (Zentrum für interdisziplinäre Forschung, ZiF)) at Bielefeld University and has cooperated with neurologists, psychiatrists, and psychologists at the national and international level. In cooperation with B. L. Miller, he is editor of the journal Neurocase and director of the university's memory clinic. He was a member of the German Research Foundation's senate committee for Collaborative Research Centers for more than eight years, and has worked as an expert with the courts.

== Research ==
- "Eyewitness Memory" (in cooperation with psychologists and jurists in Haifa, Rotterdam, and Aberdeen/London, EU, 2007–ongoing)
- "False memories und exekutive Funktionen" ["False memories and executive functions"] (DFG [German Research Foundation] 2001–2010)
- "Erinnerung und Gedächtnis: Interdisziplinäre Untersuchung zur emotionalen und kognitiven Erinnerung" [Recollection and Memory: an interdisciplinary study on emotional and cognitive memory] (in cooperation with H. Welzer, VW-Foundation, 2001–2004)
- "Emotionen als bio-kulturelle Prozesse" ["Emotions as biocultural processes"] (in cooperation with B. Röttger-Rössler, ZIF Bielefeld [Center for Interdisciplinary Research], 2004/2005)
- "Neurale Korrelate des Risiko-Entscheidungsverhaltens" [Neural correlates of risk decision-making conduct"] (in cooperation with J. Kessler and F. Wörmann, DFG [German Research Foundation], 2005–2007)
- "Cognitive Interaction Technology" (Cluster of Excellence Cognitive Interaction Technology, CITEC, at Bielefeld University, Principal Investigator, 2007-ongoing)
- "Stress, dissoziative Störungen, Immigration und Forensik" ["Stress, dissociative disorders, immigration, and forensic science"] (research funding of the University of Bielefeld, since 1996)
- "Integrity of the default network in posttraumatic stress disorder" (in cooperation with Canadian and Israeli researchers, EU, applied for).

== Selected publications ==
- 2006. "Implikationen neurowissenschaftlicher Erkenntnisse für die Jurisprudenz am Beispiel von Glaubwürdigkeitsfeststellungen" [Implications of neuroscientific knowledge for jurisprudence exemplified by credibility findings. Kriminalistik 10: 619–625.
- with W. Siefer. 2007. Tatort Gehirn. Auf der Suche nach dem Ursprung des Verbrechens. [The brain as scene of crime. Searching for the origins of crime] Frankfurt a. M.: Campus Verlag (paperback 2009. Munich: Piper).
- with E. Kalbe. 2007. "Neuroimaging and crime". In Offender's memory of violent crime, ed. S. Å. Christianson, 137–164. Chichester, UK: John Wiley & Sons.
- with B. Röttger-Rössler, eds. 2008. Emotions as biocultural processes. New York: Springer-Press.
- with S. Kühnel. 2008. Falsche Erinnerungen [Untrue memories]. Heidelberg: Spektrum.
- ed. 2008. Neuroscience and crime. Hove, UK: Psychology Press.
- with M. Brand, C. Eggers, N. Reinhold, E. Fujiwara, J. Kessler, W.-D. Heiss. 2009. "Functional brain imaging in fourteen patients with dissociative amnesia reveals right inferolateral prefrontal hypometabolism". Psychiatry Research: Neuroimaging Section 174: 32–39.
- with A. Staniloiu, and S. Borsutzky. 2010. "Dissociative memory disorders and immigration". In ASCS09: Proceedings of the 9th Conference of the Australasian Society for Cognitive Science, ed. W. Christensen, E. Schier, and J. Sutton, 316–324. Sydney: Macquarie Centre for Cognitive Science.
- with A. Staniloiu. 2010 (in press). "Neurowissenschaftliche Perspektiven zur Gewaltkriminalität". [Neuroscientific perspectives on violent crime] In Macht – Persönlichkeit – Gewalt [Power – personality – violence], ed. L. Greuel and A. Petermann. Lengerich: Pabst Verlag.
- with A. Staniloiu. (in revision). "Amnesia". Lancet.
- with M. M. Schreier. 2019 „Reframing der Bedürfnisse - Psychische Neuroimplantate“. Springer Verlag Heidelberg
