= Journey to Mecca =

- Promotional movie poster for the film
- Directed by: Bruce Neibaur
- Written by: Carl Knutson; Bruce Neibaur; Tahir Shah
- Produced by: Taran Davies; Dominic Cummingham-Reid; Jonathan Barker; Dounia Productions
- Starring: Chems-Eddine Zinoune; Hassam Ghancy; Nabil Elouahabi; Nadim Sawalha
- Narrated by: Ben Kingsley
- Cinematography: Matthew Williams; Afshin Javadi; Ghasem Ebrahimian; Rafey Mehmood
- Music by: Michael Brook (original)
- Production company: Cosmic Picture
- Distributed by: SK Films; National Geographic
- Release date: January 7, 2009
- Running time: 45 minutes
- Country: United States
- Languages: English; Arabic
- Budget: $13 million

Journey to Mecca: In the Footsteps of Ibn Battuta is an IMAX ("giant screen") dramatised documentary film charting the first real-life journey made by the Islamic scholar Ibn Battuta from his native Morocco to Mecca for the Hajj (Muslim pilgrimage), in 1325.

== Background ==
The 20-year-old Muslim religious law student Ibn Battuta (1304–1368), set out from Tangier, a city in northern Morocco, in 1325, on a pilgrimage to Mecca, some 3,000 miles (over 4,800 km) to the East. The journey took him 18 months to complete and along the way he met with misfortune and adversity, including attack by bandits, rescue by Bedouins, fierce sand storms and dehydration.

Ibn Battuta spent a total of 29 years travelling and covered 75,000 miles (117,000 kilometres) before he finally returned home. He travelled "further than any writer before him [...] covering most of the known world", through Africa, Spain, India, China and the Maldives.

On Ibn Battuta's return the Sultan of Morocco requested that he relate his experiences, and this was to become what the Saudi Gazette referred to as "one of the world's most famous travel books", The Rihla (Voyage).

== Film synopsis ==
With narration by Ben Kingsley, the film, which is "bookended" by scenes from the contemporary Muslim pilgrimage, chronicles the first 18-month-long leg of Ibn Battuta's journey, to Mecca. It was filmed in Morocco and Saudi Arabia in English and Arabic, with Berber in the background.

On the way to Mecca, riding alone on horseback, Ibn Battuta was held up by bandits, robbed and nearly killed, but when the leader of the bandits realized that he was a pilgrim, feeling ashamed, he offered to escort Ibn Battuta to Egypt (for a fee). It was a difficult journey by camel across the desert and they were faced with fierce sandstorms, before taking to boats to navigate the Nile. Reaching Egypt, he handed a letter given to him by a friend to a Sheikh, and based on a Hadith (an oral tradition) of the Prophet Muhammed, he was advised "to seek knowledge to China", hence his further extensive travels.

Ibn Battuta had intended to continue his journey to Mecca by sea, via the port of ‘Aydhab on the Red Sea, but war and the dangers that posed made him travel by land through Damascus instead, joining a 10,000-strong caravan of fellow pilgrims along the way, staying with them until they finally reach their destination, Mecca.

== Leading actor ==
According to The Jakarta Post, "The lead, Chems Eddine Zinoun, was born in 1980 in Casablanca [Morocco] and studied classical ballet and the piano. He died in a car accident on 11 November 2008 in Casablanca, where he lived. His portrayal of Ibn Battuta shows a depth of feeling that will remain with audiences long after watching Journey [to Mecca]."

== Reception ==
=== Genre ===
Big Movie Zone described the film's genre as docudrama, whilst a review at that site, remarking that it was the most unusual giant screen film the reviewer had yet seen, called it "a biopic guised as a documentary".

=== Reviews ===
According to a review on the National Post in Canada, the IMAX format is best suited to the vast landscapes which Ibn Battuta crossed and less so for the close-ups and market places. As for the Hajj itself, this has been described as "stunning footage". The reviewer writes that "Journey to Mecca succeeds best in capturing the wonder, pageantry and beauty that are the hallmarks of any religion's central celebration. Though it is arguably impossible to catch an image of the Almighty on film, this doc comes as close as any."

Ann Coates, reviewing the film at Big Movie Zone, stated that with very little narration, unlike other giant screen productions, this helps the dramatic portrayal of Ibn Battuta and "his dangerous trek". Ross Anthony, also reviewing at BMZ, is of the opinion that the early special effects are nice and moody, though the desert is barren and unappealing. However, "once in Mecca, the images shine." The reviewer finds the acting "very good for the format".

Bruce Kirkland of Sun Media in Canada described Journey to Mecca as a "beautifully wrought film ... meticulously researched ... everyone, no matter their faith, should see it". Trade Arabia in the UAE wrote: "A powerful, larger than life cinematic experience that has the power to educate both young and old. Its message of tolerance and respect will resonate strongly with audiences." The Detroit Free Press in the USA said: "...dramatic desert landscapes ... unprecedented access to the Great Mosque ... breathtaking aerial views ... a cosmic experience"; and Nick Meyer wrote in The Arab American News that the film was a "... Breathtaking ... Beautiful, inspiring (story) with many visual delights ... Highly recommended."

Martina Zainal of The Jakarta Post writes that "the photography is stunning and takes us to dizzying heights over grand scenes, and directors of photography Afshin Javadi, Ghasem Ebrahimian and Rafey Mahmood have helped show us a side of Islam that is rarely seen in today’s news. It is a film worth seeing by Muslims and non-Muslims alike."

The film has also received positive reviews in Jewish publications. Anthony Frosh and Rachel Sacks-Davis of the Jewish journal Galus Australis praised the "breathtaking" cinematography, also writing "Whilst Ibn Battuta’s 14th century Hajj was much closer in time to us than our biblical forefathers, his experience of travel was surely much closer to theirs. The isolation, danger and vulnerability that marked his journey surely also marked theirs. And the spiritual gifts that so explicitly mark the journeys of our forefathers are also implicit in Ibn Battuta’s Journey to Mecca."

=== Endorsement ===
The film was officially endorsed by Saudi Arabian Prince Turki bin Faisal Al Saud al-Faisal, the youngest son of the late King Faisal, former Director General of the kingdom's Al Mukhabarat Al A'amah (General Intelligence Presidency (G.I.P.)), former ambassador to the United Kingdom and Ireland, and former ambassador to the United States who wrote, "Not only does the film represent an accurate and respectful portrayal of Islam, it provides a wonderful opportunity for Muslims to celebrate a revered hero in Ibn Battuta and to honor our faith."

== Awards ==
Journey to Mecca won Le Prix Du Public Most Popular Film at Le Géode Film Festival, Paris, 2009, and a prize at the Tribeca Film Festival in New York City.

== See also ==
- List of Islamic films
- Hajj
- Ibn Battuta
- Le Grand Voyage ( French film )
