= List of awards and nominations received by Xavier Dolan =

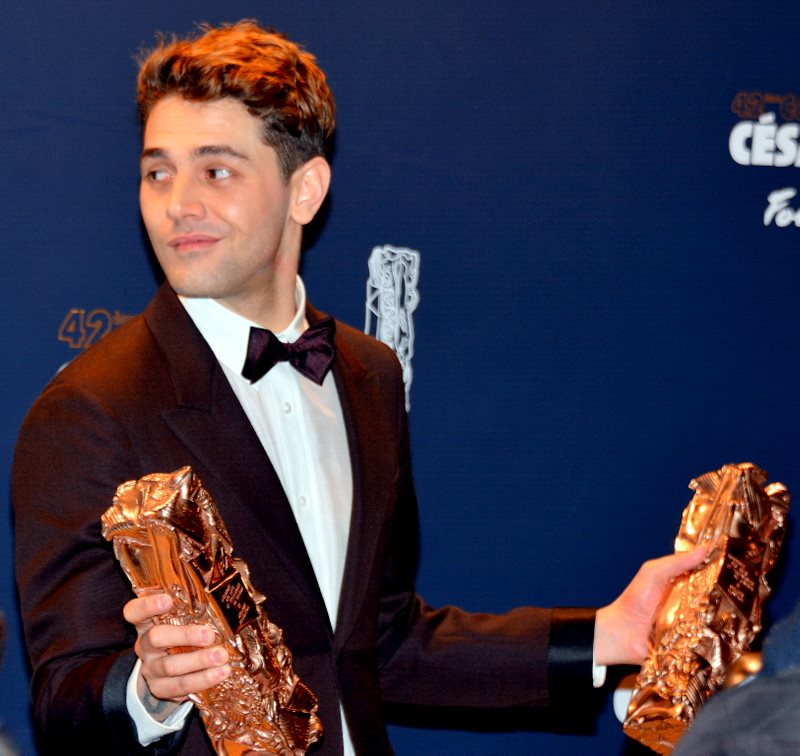
Dolan with two César Awards for Best Director and Best Editing for It's Only the End of the World.

This is a list of awards and nominations for French Canadian filmmaker Xavier Dolan. Dolan has been awarded as a director, screenwriter, actor, editor, producer and costume designer in his films. He has received honours at the Cannes Film Festival, Canadian Screen Awards, Prix Iris and César Awards, as well as in other forums.

Canada's committee for selecting submissions for the Academy Award for Best Foreign Language Film have also chosen Dolan's films I Killed My Mother for the 82nd Academy Awards and Mommy for the 87th Academy Awards; neither was nominated. It's Only the End of the World was submitted for the 89th Academy Awards and was shortlisted.

== Cannes Film Festival ==
Dolan’s films frequently premiere at the Cannes Film Festival.

Year	Category	Nominated work	Result	Ref.
2009	Caméra d'Or	I Killed My Mother	Nominated	
2009	Regards Jeunes Prize	I Killed My Mother	Won	
2009	C.I.C.A.E. Award	I Killed My Mother	Won	
2009	SACD Prize	I Killed My Mother	Won	
2010	Un Certain Regard	Heartbeats	Nominated	
2010	Regards Jeunes Prize	Heartbeats	Won	
2012	Un Certain Regard	Laurence Anyways	Nominated	
2012	Queer Palm	Laurence Anyways	Won	
2014	Palme d'Or	Mommy	Nominated	
2014	Jury Prize	Mommy	Won	
2014	Queer Palm	Mommy	Nominated	
2016	Palme d'Or	It's Only the End of the World	Nominated	
2016	Grand Prix	It's Only the End of the World	Won	
2016	Ecumenical Jury Prize	It's Only the End of the World	Won	
2019	Palme d'Or	Matthias & Maxime	Nominated	
2019	Queer Palm	Matthias & Maxime	Nominated	

== César Awards ==
Dolan's films have been nominated for Best Foreign Film at the César Awards, France's national awards; It's Only the End of the World was additionally nominated in multiple categories.

Year	Category	Nominated work	Result	Ref.
2010	Best Foreign Film	I Killed My Mother	Nominated	
2011	Best Foreign Film	Heartbeats	Nominated	
2013	Best Foreign Film	Laurence Anyways	Nominated	
2015	Best Foreign Film	Mommy	Won	
2017	Best Foreign Film	It's Only the End of the World	Nominated	
2017	Best Director	It's Only the End of the World	Won	
2017	Best Editing	It's Only the End of the World	Won	
2022	Best Supporting Actor	Lost Illusions	Nominated	
2026	Best Supporting Actor	The Great Arch	Nominated	

== Genie Awards and Canadian Screen Awards ==
The Genie Awards were Canada's national film awards; they were merged into the Canadian Screen Awards in 2012.

Year	Category	Nominated work	Result	Ref.
2010	Claude Jutra Award	I Killed My Mother	Won	
2011	Best Motion Picture	Heartbeats	Nominated	
2011	Best Direction	Heartbeats	Nominated	
2013	Best Direction	Laurence Anyways	Nominated	
2013	Best Original Screenplay	Laurence Anyways	Nominated	
2013	Best Costume Design	Laurence Anyways	Won (Note: Shared with François Barbeau)	
2014	Best Direction	Tom at the Farm	Nominated	
2014	Best Motion Picture	Tom at the Farm	Nominated (Note: Shared with Charles Gillibert and Nathanaël Karmitz)	
2014	Best Adapted Screenplay	Tom at the Farm	Nominated (Note: Shared with Michel Marc Bouchard)	
2015	Best Direction	Mommy	Won	
2015	Best Motion Picture	Mommy	Won (Note: Shared with Nancy Grant)	
2015	Best Costume Design	Mommy	Nominated	
2015	Best Editing	Mommy	Won	
2015	Best Original Screenplay	Mommy	Won	
2017	Best Direction	It's Only the End of the World	Won	
2017	Best Motion Picture	It's Only the End of the World	Won (Note: Shared with Sylvain Corbeil and Nancy Grant)	
2017	Best Adapted Screenplay	It's Only the End of the World	Won	

== Grammy Awards ==
Year	Category	Nominated work	Result	Ref.
2023	Best Music Video	"Easy on Me" by Adele	Nominated	

== Jutra Awards and Prix Iris ==
Quebec's film awards were formerly known as the Jutra Awards; the Prix Iris name was announced in October 2016.

Year	Category	Nominated work	Result	Ref.
2010	Best Film	I Killed My Mother	Won (Note: Shared with Carole Mondello and Daniel Morin)	
2010	Best Director	I Killed My Mother	Nominated	
2010	Best Screenplay	I Killed My Mother	Won	
2010	Best Actor	I Killed My Mother	Nominated	
2010	Most Successful Film Outside Québec	I Killed My Mother	Won	
2011	Best Film	Heartbeats	Nominated	
2011	Best Director	Heartbeats	Nominated	
2011	Best Editing	Heartbeats	Nominated	
2011	Most Successful Film Outside Québec	Heartbeats	Won	
2013	Best Director	Laurence Anyways	Nominated	
2013	Best Screenplay	Laurence Anyways	Nominated	
2013	Most Successful Film Outside Québec	Laurence Anyways	Nominated	
2014	Most Successful Film Outside Québec	Tom at the Farm	Nominated	
2015	Most Successful Film Outside Québec	Tom at the Farm		
2015	Most Successful Film Outside Québec	Tom at the Farm	Nominated	
2015	Best Film	Tom at the Farm	Nominated (Note: Shared with Lyse Lafontaine and Nancy Grant)	
2015	Best Director	Tom at the Farm	Nominated	
2015	Best Screenplay	Tom at the Farm	Nominated	
2015	Best Film	Mommy	Won	
2015	Best Director	Mommy	Won	
2015	Best Screenplay	Mommy	Won	
2015	Best Costume Design	Mommy	Nominated	
2015	Best Editing	Mommy	Won	
2015	Most Successful Film Outside Québec	Mommy	Won	
2015	Billet d'or	Mommy	Won	
2016	Best Actor	Elephant Song	Nominated	
2017	Best Film	It's Only the End of the World	Won	
2017	Best Director	It's Only the End of the World	Won	
2017	Best Casting	It's Only the End of the World	Won	
2017	Public Prize	It's Only the End of the World	Nominated	
2017	Most Successful Film Outside Québec	It's Only the End of the World	Won	
2020	Best Editing	Matthias & Maxime	Nominated	
2020	Most Successful Film Outside Québec	Matthias & Maxime	Won	

== Prix Gémeaux ==
The Prix Gémeaux honour achievements in Canadian television and digital media that is broadcast in French.

Year	Category	Nominated work	Result	Ref.
2023	Best Drama Series	The Night Logan Woke Up	Nominated	
2023	Best Direction - Drama Series	The Night Logan Woke Up	Won	
2023	Best Writing - Drama Series	The Night Logan Woke Up	Nominated	
2023	Best Editing - Fiction	The Night Logan Woke Up	Won (Note: Shared with Stéphane Lafleur)	
2023	Best Supporting Role in a Drama Series	The Night Logan Woke Up	Nominated	

== Other awards ==
Year	Nominated work	Award / Festival	Category	Result	Ref.
2009-2010	I Killed My Mother	Vancouver International Film Festival	Best Canadian Film	Won	
2009-2010	I Killed My Mother	Lumière Awards	Best French-Language Film	Won	
2009-2010	I Killed My Mother	Reykjavík International Film Festival	Golden Puffin	Won	
2009-2010	I Killed My Mother	Toronto Film Critics Association	Stella Artois Jay Scott Prize	Won	
2009-2010	I Killed My Mother	Vancouver Film Critics Circle	Best Canadian Film	Won	
2009-2010	I Killed My Mother	Vancouver Film Critics Circle	Best Director of a Canadian Film	Won	
2009-2010	I Killed My Mother	Vancouver Film Critics Circle	Best Actor in a Canadian Film	Won	
2010	Heartbeats	Sydney Film Festival	Sydney Film Prize	Won	
2012-2013	Laurence Anyways	Lumière Awards	Best French-Language Film	Nominated	
2012-2013	Laurence Anyways	Toronto International Film Festival	Best Canadian Feature Film	Won	
2012-2013	Laurence Anyways	Guldbagge Awards	Best Foreign Film	Nominated	
2014	Tom at the Farm	Venice International Film Festival	FIPRESCI Award	Won	
2014-2015	Mommy	Dorian Awards	Wilde Artist of the Year	Nominated	
2014-2015	Mommy	Lumière Awards	Best French-Language Film	Nominated	
2014-2015	Mommy	Tallinn Black Nights Film Festival	Best North American Independent Film	Won	
2014-2015	Mommy	Toronto Film Critics Association	Best Canadian Film	Nominated	
2016	"Hello" by Adele	Juno Award	Video of the Year	Won	
2016	"Hello" by Adele	MTV Video Music Awards	Best Direction	Nominated	
2016	"Hello" by Adele	MTV Video Music Awards	Best Editing	Nominated	
2016-2017	It's Only the End of the World	Filmfest Hamburg	Art Cinema Award	Won	
2016-2017	It's Only the End of the World	Globes de Cristal Award	Best Film	Nominated	
2016-2017	It's Only the End of the World	Lumière Awards	Best French-Language Film	Nominated	
2022	"Easy on Me" by Adele	Juno Awards	Music Video of the Year	Won	
