= 17th Jutra Awards =

2015 Canadian film awards ceremony

The 17th Jutra Awards were held on March 15, 2015 to honour films made with the participation of the Quebec film industry in 2014.

Xavier Dolan's Mommy and Tom at the Farm (Tom à la ferme) received eleven and nine nominations respectively and swept the ceremony, taking home ten awards and the Billet d'or, including every award in the major categories: Best Film, Best Director, Best Screenplay, Best Actor for Antoine Olivier Pilon, Best Actress for Anne Dorval and Best Supporting Actress for Suzanne Clément, all for Mommy, as well as Best Supporting Actor for Pierre-Yves Cardinal for Tom at the Farm (Tom à la ferme). Mommy became the second film after C.R.A.Z.Y. to win three acting awards. Tom at the Farm (Tom à la ferme) also received a nomination for Most Successful Film Outside Quebec during the previous ceremony, bringing its total to ten nominations.

Other winners included You're Sleeping Nicole (Tu dors Nicole) who took home two awards from nine nominations and 1987 who took home three awards from eight nominations.

Xavier Dolan received a record ten individual nominations, becoming the first director to be nominated twice for Best Director and Most Successful Film Outside Quebec in the same year and the first screenwriter to be nominated twice for Best Screenplay. He also received two nominations for Best Film as a producer and two nominations in technical categories, namely Best Editing and Best Costume Design. Dolan won five competitive awards as well as the Billet d'or award, setting the record for most awards won by an individual in a single ceremony.

They were the last awards to be presented under the Jutra name; in early 2016, Quebec Cinema renamed the awards after the publication of a biography of Claude Jutra, the award's former namesake, which contained allegations that he had sexually abused underage children during his lifetime.

== Winners and nominees ==
Best Film	Best Director
Mommy — Nancy Grant, Xavier Dolan; 1987 — Nicole Robert; 3 Indian Tales (3 histoires d'indiens) — Virginie Dubois, Robert Morin; Tom at the Farm (Tom à la ferme) — Xavier Dolan, Nancy Grant, Lyse Lafontaine, Charles Gillibert, Nathanaël Karmitz; You're Sleeping Nicole (Tu dors Nicole) — Luc Déry, Kim McCraw	Xavier Dolan, Mommy; Xavier Dolan Tom at the Farm (Tom à la ferme); Stéphane Lafleur, You're Sleeping Nicole (Tu dors Nicole); Robert Morin, 3 Indian Tales (3 histoires d'indiens); Denis Villeneuve, Enemy
Best Actor	Best Actress
Antoine Olivier Pilon, Mommy; Walter Borden, Gerontophilia; Jean-Carl Boucher, 1987; Guy Nadon, Guardian Angel (L'ange gardien); Patrice Robitaille, The Little Queen (La petite reine)	Anne Dorval, Mommy; Julianne Côté, You're Sleeping Nicole (Tu dors Nicole); Laurence Leboeuf, The Little Queen (La petite reine); Joëlle Paré-Beaulieu, What Are We Doing Here? (Qu'est-ce qu'on fait ici ?); Lise Roy, Tom at the Farm (Tom à la ferme)
Best Supporting Actor	Best Supporting Actress
Pierre-Yves Cardinal, Tom at the Farm (Tom à la ferme); Robin Aubert, Miraculum; Patrick Hivon, Guardian Angel (L'ange gardien); Francis La Haye, You're Sleeping Nicole (Tu dors Nicole); Stephen McHattie, Meetings with a Young Poet	Suzanne Clément, Mommy; Dalal Ata, Arwad; Sandrine Bisson, 1987; Evelyne Brochu, Tom at the Farm (Tom à la ferme); Catherine St-Laurent, You're Sleeping Nicole (Tu dors Nicole)
Best Screenplay	Best Cinematography
Xavier Dolan, Mommy; Xavier Dolan and Michel Marc Bouchard, Tom at the Farm (Tom à la ferme); Stéphane Lafleur, You're Sleeping Nicole (Tu dors Nicole); Robert Morin, 3 Indian Tales (3 histoires d'indiens); Ricardo Trogi, 1987	André Turpin, Mommy; Nicolas Bolduc, Enemy; Mathieu Laverdière, Henri Henri; Sara Mishara, You're Sleeping Nicole (Tu dors Nicole); André Turpin, Tom at the Farm (Tom à la ferme)
Best Art Direction	Best Sound
Patrice Vermette, 1987; Marie-Claude Gosselin, Henri Henri; Guy Lalande, The Grand Seduction; Colombe Raby, Mommy; Patrice Vermette, Enemy	Sylvain Bellemare, Pierre Bertrand and Bernard Gariépy Strobl, You're Sleeping Nicole (Tu dors Nicole); Mario Auclair, Stéphane Bergeron, Marcel Pothier and Christian Rivest, The Little Queen (La petite reine); Bruno Bélanger, Louis Collin, Bernard Gariépy Strobl and Robert Morin, 3 Indian Tales (3 histoires d'indiens); Olivier Calvert, Clovis Gouaillier and Sylvain Vary, Arwad; Eric Ladouceur, Luc Mandeville and Lynne Trépanier, Uvanga
Best Editing	Best Original Music
Xavier Dolan, Mommy; Glenn Berman, Uvanga; Michel Giroux, 3 Indian Tales (3 histoires d'indiens); Louis-Philippe Rathé, The Little Queen (La petite reine); Yvann Thibaudeau, 1987	Rémy Nadeau-Aubin and Christophe Lamarche-Ledoux, You're Sleeping Nicole (Tu dors Nicole); Alain Auger, Uvanga; Jeff Barnaby and Joe Barrucco, Rhymes for Young Ghouls; Michel Corriveau, Exile (Exil); Patrice Dubuc, Gaëtan Gravel, Meetings with a Young Poet
Best Costume Design	Best Makeup
Valérie Lévesque, 1987; Francesca Chamberland, Henri Henri; Xavier Dolan, Mommy; Véronique Marchessault, Maïna; Denis Sperdouklis, The Grand Seduction	Lizane Lasalle, Henri Henri; Brigitte Bilodeau, Maïna; Kathryn Casault and Annick Legout, Tom at the Farm (Tom à la ferme); Danielle Huard, La garde; Colleen Quinton, Meetings with a Young Poet
Best Hairstyling	Best Documentary
Daniel Jacob, 1987; Réjean Forget and Cynthia Patton, Maïna; Ann-Louise Landry, Miraculum; Martin Lapointe, Henri Henri; Ghislaine Sant, Love Project	Serge Giguère, Nicole Hubert, Colette Loumède, Sylvie Van Brabant, Finding Macpherson (Le mystère Macpherson); Danic Champoux, Colette Loumède, Self(less) Portrait (Autoportrait sans moi); Khoa Lê, Karine Dubois, Grandma (Bà nôi); Steve Patry, From Prisons to Prisons (De prisons en prisons); Jean-François Caissy, Johanne Bergeron, Colette Loumède, Guidelines (La marche à suivre)
Best Live Short	Best Animated Short
François Jaros, Life's a Bitch (Toutes des connes); Patrick Bossé, Anatomie; Sophie B. Jacques, Chaloupe; Matthew Rankin, Mynarski Death Plummet (Mynarski chute mortelle); Simon Laganière, Follow the Fox (Suivre la piste du renard)	Marie-Josée Saint-Pierre, Jutra; Davide Di Saro, Lucky and Finnegan; Mark Lomond and Johanne Ste-Marie, Migration; Nicola Lemay and Janice Nadeau, No Fish Where to Go (Nul poisson où aller); Michèle Cournoyer, Soif
Most Successful Film Outside Quebec	Billet d'or
Mommy — Xavier Dolan; Gerontophilia — Bruce LaBruce; The Grand Seduction — Don McKellar; Tom at the Farm (Tom à la ferme) — Xavier Dolan; You're Sleeping Nicole (Tu dors Nicole) — Stéphane Lafleur	Mommy

== Multiple wins and nominations ==
=== Films with multiple nominations ===
Nominations	Film
11	Mommy
10	You're Sleeping Nicole (Tu dors Nicole)
9	Tom at the Farm (Tom à la ferme)
8	1987
5	3 Indian Tales (3 histoires d'indiens)
5	Henri Henri
4	The Little Queen (La petite reine)
3	Enemy
3	The Grand Seduction
3	Maïna
3	Meetings with a Young Poet
3	Uvanga
2	Arwad
2	Gerontophilia
2	Guardian Angel (L'ange gardien)
2	Miraculum

=== Films with multiple wins ===
Wins	Film
10	Mommy
3	1987
2	You're Sleeping Nicole (Tu dors Nicole)
