= Tom at the Farm =

2013 film by Xavier Dolan

- Theatrical release poster
- French: Tom à la ferme
- Directed by: Xavier Dolan
- Screenplay by: Xavier Dolan; Michel Marc Bouchard
- Based on: Tom at the Farm by Michel Marc Bouchard
- Produced by: Nathanaël Karmitz; Charles Gillibert; Xavier Dolan
- Starring: Xavier Dolan; Pierre-Yves Cardinal; Lise Roy; Evelyne Brochu; Manuel Tadros; Jacques Lavallée; Anne Caron
- Cinematography: André Turpin
- Edited by: Xavier Dolan
- Music by: Gabriel Yared
- Production companies: MK2; Sons of Manual; Arte France Cinéma; Arte/Cofinova 9
- Distributed by: Les Films Séville (Canada); Diaphana Distribution (France)
- Release dates: 2 September 2013 (Venice); 28 March 2014 (Canada); 16 April 2014 (France)
- Running time: 95 minutes
- Countries: Canada; France
- Language: French
- Box office: $687,505

Tom at the Farm (French: Tom à la ferme) is a 2013 psychological thriller film directed by and starring Xavier Dolan. The film is based on the play of the same name by Michel Marc Bouchard, who co-wrote the screenplay with Dolan. It also stars Pierre-Yves Cardinal, Lise Roy, Evelyne Brochu, Manuel Tadros, Jacques Lavallée and Anne Caron. The plot follows Tom (Dolan), a young man from Montreal who travels to the Quebec countryside for his boyfriend's funeral. There, he meets his mother (Roy), who is unaware of her deceased son's sexual orientation, and his aggressive brother (Cardinal) who insists that Tom hide their relationship from his grieving mother.

A co-production between Canada and France, Tom at the Farm had its world premiere on 2 September 2013 in the main competition section of the 70th Venice International Film Festival, where it won the FIPRESCI Prize. The film was released theatrically in Canada on 28 March 2014 and in France on 16 April 2014. It was nominated for eight Canadian Screen Awards, including Best Motion Picture.

== Plot ==
When his boyfriend Guillaume dies at 25 in an unspecified accident, Tom, a young advertising agency editor from Montreal, visits Guillaume's rural community in Quebec to deliver a eulogy at the funeral. He meets Guillaume's widowed mother, Agathe Longchamp, who does not know Guillaume was gay and that Tom was his lover. When Tom agrees to stay at the farmhouse, he is surprised when Agathe tells him Guillaume has an elder brother, Francis. That night, Tom is awakened by Francis, who menacingly says he knew Tom would come, and tells him to give an agreeable eulogy and not to posthumously out Guillaume, to please Agathe.

At the funeral, Tom decides at the last minute not to speak, and music is played instead. Francis afterwards confronts Tom in a bathroom stall about the mishap. After begrudgingly returning to the farmhouse, Tom tells Agathe he made his decision because he was dissatisfied with his eulogy. Agathe knows Guillaume had a lover, but believes it was a young woman, Guillaume and Tom's co-worker Sarah. Tom reads his eulogy on the pretence that Sarah wrote it. While alone with Francis, Tom proclaims his intention to tell Agathe the truth and then leave. Francis chases Tom through a cornfield and physically attacks him, forcing him to stay, but later takes him to a doctor to treat his injuries.

Tom begins helping Francis with the chores at the farm, particularly milking and calving. After they deliver a calf, Francis tends to a wound on Tom's wrist, before coercing him into snorting cocaine. They then dance together in the barn, after Francis reveals he used to take tango lessons with Guillaume. When Francis tells Agathe they named a calf Bitch Ass, in Tom's honour, she berates Francis, prompting him to take his anger out on Tom and beat him. Tom tries to leave but finds that Francis has removed all of the tires from his car. That night, as they go out drinking, Francis chokes Tom, who asks him to choke him harder, but Francis stops after Tom tells him that he reminds him of Guillaume.

One evening, Francis arrives at the farmhouse and is surprised to find Sarah with Agathe. When alone with Sarah, Francis confronts her aggressively, and she admits she has come to pose as Guillaume's girlfriend at Tom's request, before Francis makes threatening sexual advances towards her. Sarah secretly tries to persuade Tom to return home, noticing his bruises and mentioning Francis assaulted her earlier, but he tells her he feels a part of the family. Sarah reveals that Guillaume had numerous affairs, including with her. The group gathers in the living room, where Agathe becomes overwhelmed asking questions about Sarah's apparent lack of grief, why Guillaume stopped visiting the family and who was with Guillaume when he died.

As he goes into town with Francis and Sarah that night, Tom visits a local bar alone, where he strikes up a conversation with the bartender. When Tom mentions he is staying at the Longchamp farm, the bartender reveals that Francis is banned from the establishment. Nine years earlier, Francis and Guillaume were at the bar with another man. When the young man dancing with Guillaume told Francis he had something to say about Guillaume, Francis viciously assaulted him, tearing into his face with his hands. The young man subsequently disappeared, rumoured to be living in another town. While sitting at the bar, Tom sees Sarah board a bus back to Montreal.

The next morning, Tom escapes the farm on foot. Soon afterwards, Francis chases Tom into the woods. As Tom hides, Francis begs him to stay and insists he is trying to be a better person, before he grows angry and starts making threats. Tom steals Francis's truck and drives away. That evening, Tom spots a young man at a service station with facial scars matching the bartender's described attack.

As the credits roll, Tom drives through Montreal and observes people on the streets. A stoplight turns green, but he does not move his car forward.

== Cast ==
- Xavier Dolan as Tom Podowski
- Pierre-Yves Cardinal as Francis Longchamp
- Lise Roy as Agathe Longchamp
- Evelyne Brochu as Sarah Thibault
- Manuel Tadros as the barman
- Jacques Lavallée as the priest
- Anne Caron as the doctor
- Caleb Landry Jones as Guillaume (uncredited)

== Production ==
=== Development ===
After completing his 2012 feature film Laurence Anyways, Dolan felt that "a change of direction was needed" since, in his own words, the previous three movies dealt with the "subject of impossible love". Having seen a production of the play a year earlier, he met Bouchard at the Théâtre d'Aujourd'hui after the performance and asked him if anyone else was directing a film adaptation, before saying he would. He was fascinated by the play's violence and brutality and felt it could be explored further on screen. Dolan also liked the role of the mother in the play, since "mothers and sons, ... exhausted mothers is always appealing" to him.

It was the first time Dolan attempted an adaptation of previously published material. Writing with Bouchard was rushed, as Dolan wished for filming to begin in October 2012.

=== Filming ===
Dolan remade his appearance for the part of Tom, based on the colour of the backdrop, particularly cornfields. Lise Roy played Agathe in stage performances of Tom at the Farm, with Dolan assuring her she would have the film role after seeing her in the play. Roy found it different to be on an actual farm and said she was challenged by what she found to be a lonely shoot. For one scene, Dolan ran through a cornfield. He was warned it could be dangerous, but because it had been raining, he did not suffer any cuts.

Dolan shot a scene where Francis masturbates Tom while choking him, but Dolan ultimately decided to edit this out. Originally, Dolan had the idea to not use music in the film. He thought that silence and sounds of "howling wind, creaking floorboards" would increase the tension. This idea was scrapped during the editing process, and he asked the Academy Award-winning composer Gabriel Yared to create the score for the film.

== Release ==
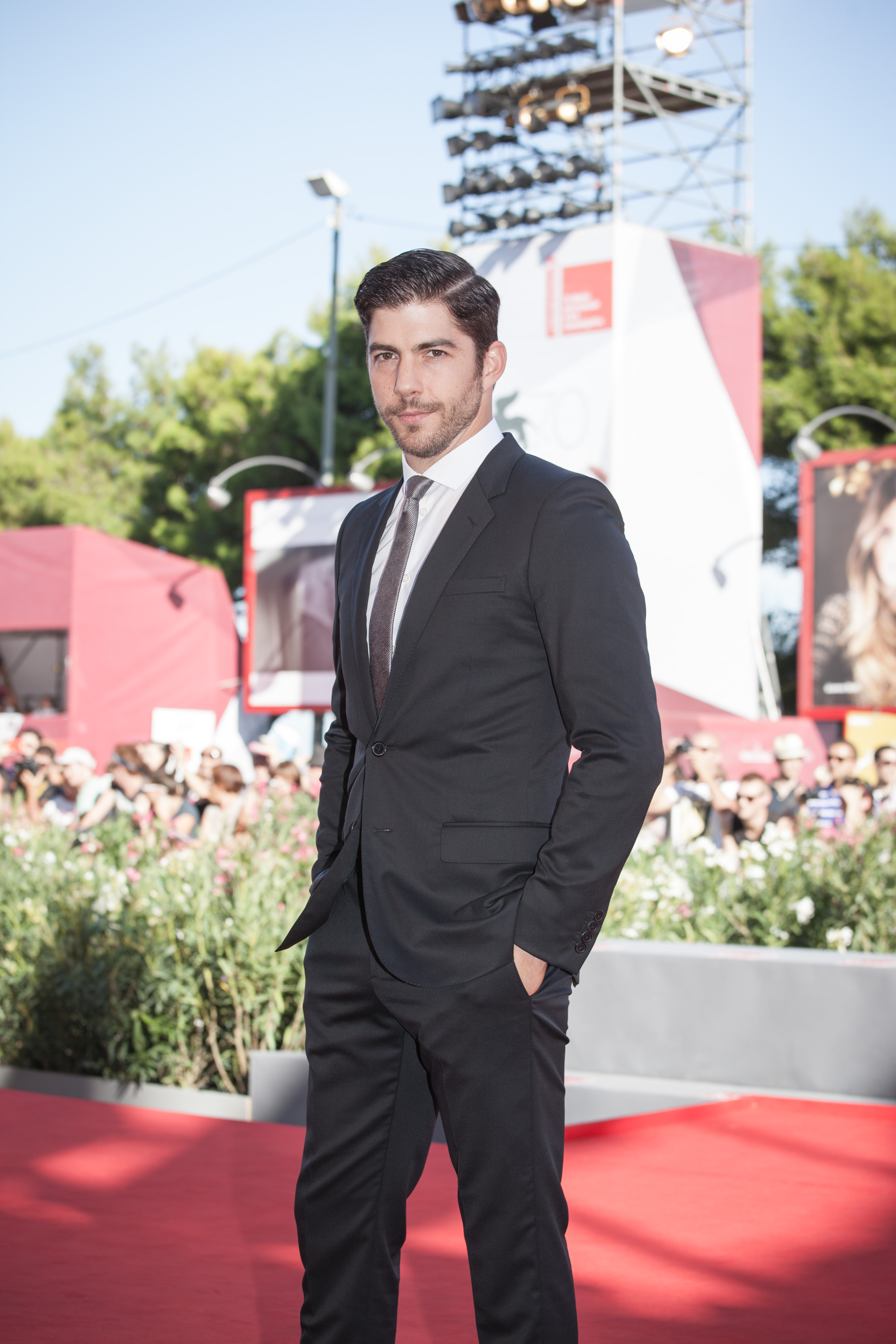
Star Pierre-Yves Cardinal at the 70th Venice International Film Festival

Tom at the Farm premiered at the 70th Venice International Film Festival on 2 September 2013, receiving a standing ovation. The film had its North American premiere in the Special Presentations section of the Toronto International Film Festival on 10 September 2013.

Distributed by Les Films Séville, Tom at the Farm was released theatrically in Quebec on 28 March 2024. The film opened on 30 May in Toronto and Vancouver, followed by screenings in Victoria, British Columbia, on 20 June. It was released in France on 16 April 2014 by Diaphana Distribution. In the United States, the film struggled to secure a distributor due to Dolan not being known to US audiences, and his films being released there by different distributors. After Dolan's 2014 film Mommy sparked interest, Tom at the Farm was eventually released in theaters and on video on demand in the US on 14 August 2015 by Amplify Releasing.

== Reception ==
=== Critical response ===
Tom at the Farm received generally favourable reviews. On the review aggregator website Rotten Tomatoes, the film holds an approval rating of 78% based on 72 reviews, with an average rating of 7.1/10. The website's critics consensus reads, "Taut, chilling, and overall engrossing, Tom at the Farm offers further confirmation that writer-director Xavier Dolan is a filmmaking talent to be reckoned with." Metacritic, which uses a weighted average, assigned the film a score of 67 out of 100, based on 27 critics, indicating "generally favorable" reviews.

In Canada, La Presse critic Marc-André Lussier gave it three-and-a-half stars, finding it distinct from Dolan's previous works, more Hitchcockian, and praising André Turpin's photography and how Yared's score complemented the story. Eric Moreault, also of La Presse, gave it three and a half stars, writing that with its psychology, the film owed as much to Ingmar Bergman as Alfred Hitchcock. In Voir, Manon Dumais praised Dolan for building on Turpin's photography and Yared's music and drawing on thriller and horror film elements to capture the repressed family and community. Kate Taylor wrote a negative review in The Globe and Mail, criticising Dolan for reusing similar shots and questioning why Francis would become a social pariah rather than go to prison.

Peter Bradshaw of The Guardian described it as an "intriguing [film] coiled with ardor and fear". Irish Times' Tara Brady gave it five out of five stars and hailed it as a "work of genius", in which Dolan "transforms Michel Marc Bouchard's source stage play into a unique, enigmatic thriller". Variety's Guy Lodge also wrote a positive review of the film, citing it as "Dolan's most accomplished and enjoyable work to date, ... also his most commercially viable". He praised the "glorious" score by Yared and the "gorgeous" cinematography of André Turpin. David Ehrlich in his review for Film.com gave the film a rating of 7.7, writing that Tom at the Farm is "seldom less than gripping as an exercise in suspense". Ehrlich also noted the score as "urgently bleating".

The Hollywood Reporter's critic David Rooney reviewed the film unfavorably and criticised Dolan for being self-obsessed. He wrote, "It's also hard to take the film seriously when scene after scene explores the director's face with such swooning intoxication. Shots of Tom are held and held and then held some more—at the wheel of his car, in the cornfields, running in slow motion with his blond locks dancing in the breeze, sitting pensively on a bed in his underwear, or looking out through a screen door as a single tear streaks his face, like Anne Hathaway in Les Miserables". Dolan replied to Rooney in a tweet: "You can kiss my narcissistic ass".

=== Accolades ===
In nominations, Tom at the Farm was a major contender at the 2nd Canadian Screen Awards, where it was competing for Best Motion Picture. Dolan was a favourite at the 17th Jutra Awards, where his films Tom at the Farm and Mommy were pitted against each other in several categories, including Best Film.

Award	Date of ceremony	Category	Recipient(s)	Result	Ref.
Canadian Screen Awards	9 March 2014	Best Motion Picture	Charles Gillibert, Nathanaël Karmitz, Xavier Dolan	Nominated	
Canadian Screen Awards	9 March 2014	Best Director	Xavier Dolan	Nominated	
Canadian Screen Awards	9 March 2014	Best Supporting Actress	Evelyne Brochu	Nominated	
Canadian Screen Awards	9 March 2014	Best Supporting Actor	Pierre-Yves Cardinal	Nominated	
Canadian Screen Awards	9 March 2014	Best Adapted Screenplay	Michel Marc Bouchard and Xavier Dolan	Nominated	
Canadian Screen Awards	9 March 2014	Best Overall Sound	François Grenon, Olivier Goinard, Sevan Koryan and Sylvain Brassard	Nominated	
Canadian Screen Awards	9 March 2014	Best Sound Editing	Guy Francoeur, Isabelle Favreau and Sylvain Brassard	Nominated	
Canadian Screen Awards	9 March 2014	Best Original Score	Gabriel Yared	Nominated	
Jutra Awards	23 March 2014	Most Successful Film Outside Quebec	Xavier Dolan	Nominated	
Jutra Awards	15 March 2015	Best Film	Xavier Dolan, Nancy Grant and Lyse Lafontaine	Nominated	
Jutra Awards	15 March 2015	Best Direction	Xavier Dolan	Nominated	
Jutra Awards	15 March 2015	Best Screenplay	Xavier Dolan, Michel Marc Bouchard	Nominated	
Jutra Awards	15 March 2015	Best Actress	Lise Roy	Nominated	
Jutra Awards	15 March 2015	Best Supporting Actor	Pierre-Yves Cardinal	Won	
Jutra Awards	15 March 2015	Best Supporting Actress	Evelyne Brochu	Nominated	
Jutra Awards	15 March 2015	Best Cinematography	André Turpin	Nominated	
Jutra Awards	15 March 2015	Best Makeup	Kathryn Casault, Annick Legout	Nominated	
Jutra Awards	15 March 2015	Most Successful Film Outside Quebec	Xavier Dolan	Nominated	
Prix collégial du cinéma québécois	2015	Best Film	Tom at the Farm	Nominated	
Vancouver Film Critics Circle	8 January 2014	Best Supporting Actress in a Canadian Film	Lise Roy	Won	
Venice International Film Festival	28 August – 7 September 2013	FIPRESCI Award	Xavier Dolan	Won	
