= Migration (2014 film) =

- Directed by: Mark Lomond; Johanne Ste-Marie
- Written by: Mark Lomond
- Produced by: Mark Lomond; Johanne Ste-Marie
- Music by: McKenzie Stubbert
- Production company: Fluorescent Hill
- Release date: 2014
- Running time: 7 minutes
- Country: Canada

Migration is a Canadian animated short film, directed by Mark Lomond and Johanne Ste-Marie and released in 2014. Animated in the style of an old Super 8 nature documentary, the film depicts the migration of a strange creature returning to be with the rest of his kind.

The film received a Canadian Screen Award nomination for Best Animated Short Film at the 3rd Canadian Screen Awards, and a Jutra Award nomination for Best Animated Short Film at the 17th Jutra Awards.
