= Lumière Award for Best French-Language Film =

Former annual French film award

- Awarded for: The best French-language film from outside France
- Country: France
- Presented by: Académie des Lumières
- First award: 2003
- Final award: 2019

The Lumière Award for Best French-Language Film (French: Prix Lumières du meilleur film francophone) is a discontinued award given by the Académie des Lumières from 2003 to 2019. It rewarded the best French-language film made outside France each year. It replaced the Lumière Award for Best Foreign Film (French: Prix Lumières du meilleur film étranger) that was awarded from 1996 to 2002. It was replaced in 2020 by the Lumière Award for Best International Co-Production.

== Winners and nominees ==
In the following lists, the titles and names with a blue background are the winners and recipients respectively; those not in bold are the nominees.

=== 2000s ===
Year	English title	Original title	Director (s)
2003 (8th)	The Son	Le Fils	Jean-Pierre Dardenne and Luc Dardenne
2004 (9th)	The Barbarian Invasions	Les Invasions barbares	Denys Arcand
2005 (10th)	Tomorrow We Move	Demain on déménage	Chantal Akerman
2006 (11th)	L'Enfant		Jean-Pierre Dardenne and Luc Dardenne
2007 (12th)	Bamako		Abderrahmane Sissako
2007 (12th)	The United States of Albert	Les États-Unis d'Albert	André Forcier
2007 (12th)	C.R.A.Z.Y.		Jean-Marc Vallée
2007 (12th)	Bunker Paradise		Stefan Liberski
2007 (12th)	Barakat!		Djamila Sahraoui
2008 (13th)	Délice Paloma		Nadir Moknèche
2008 (13th)	Cowboy		Benoît Mariage
2008 (13th)	Gone for a Dance	J'aurais voulu être un danseur	Alain Berliner
2008 (13th)	In the Arms of My Enemy	Voleurs de chevaux	Micha Wald
2008 (13th)	Days of Darkness	L'Age des ténèbres	Denys Arcand
2008 (13th)	Africa Paradis		Sylvestre Amoussou
2009 (14th)	Lorna's Silence	Le Silence de Lorna	Jean-Pierre Dardenne and Luc Dardenne
2009 (14th)	Johnny Mad Dog		Jean-Stéphane Sauvaire
2009 (14th)	Home		Ursula Meier
2009 (14th)	Rumba		Dominique Abel, Fiona Gordon, Bruno Romy
2009 (14th)	Faro: Goddess of the Waters	Faro, la reine des eaux	Salif Traore

=== 2010s ===
Year	English title	Original title	Director (s)
2010 (15th)	I Killed My Mother	J'ai tué ma mère	Xavier Dolan
2010 (15th)	Les Saignantes		Jean-Pierre Bekolo
2010 (15th)	That Day	1 journée	Jacob Berger
2010 (15th)	Hand of the Headless Man	Où est la main de l'homme sans tête	Guillaume Malandrin and Stéphane Malandrin
2010 (15th)	Private Lessons	Elève libre	Joachim Lafosse
2010 (15th)	Beyond the Ocean	Les Oiseaux du ciel	Eliane de Latour
2011 (16th)	A Screaming Man	Un Homme qui crie	Mahamat Saleh Haroun
2011 (16th)	Orly		Angela Schanelec
2011 (16th)	Amer		Hélène Cattet, Bruno Forzani
2011 (16th)	Illegal	Illégal	Olivier Masset-Depasse
2011 (16th)	Heartbeats	Les Amours Imaginaires	Xavier Dolan
2012 (17th)	Incendies		Denis Villeneuve
2012 (17th)	The Kid with a Bike	Le Gamin au vélo	Jean-Pierre Dardenne and Luc Dardenne
2012 (17th)	The Giants	Les Géants	Bouli Lanners
2012 (17th)	Curling		Denis Côté
2012 (17th)	Where Do We Go Now?	Et maintenant on va où ?	Nadine Labaki
2013 (18th)	The Pirogue	La Pirogue	Moussa Touré
2013 (18th)	Monsieur Lazhar		Philippe Falardeau
2013 (18th)	Laurence Anyways		Xavier Dolan
2013 (18th)	Sister	L'Enfant d'en Haut	Ursula Meier
2013 (18th)	Our Children	A perdre la raison	Joachim Lafosse
2014 (19th)	Horses of God	Les Chevaux de Dieu	Nabil Ayouch
2014 (19th)	Today	Aujourd'hui	Alain Gomis
2014 (19th)	The Repentant	El Taaib (Le Repenti)	Merzak Allouache
2014 (19th)	Dead Man Talking		Patrick Ridremont
2014 (19th)	Gabrielle		Louise Archambault
2014 (19th)	The Dismantling	Le Démantèlement	Sébastien Pilote
2015 (20th)	Two Days, One Night	Deux jours, une nuit	Jean-Pierre and Luc Dardenne
2015 (20th)	C'est eux les chiens...		Hisham Lasri
2015 (20th)	Fièvres		Hicham Ayouch
2015 (20th)	L'Oranais		Lyès Salem
2015 (20th)	Mommy		Xavier Dolan
2015 (20th)	Run		Philippe Lacôte
2016 (21st)
2016 (21st)	Much Loved		Nabil Ayouch
2016 (21st)	As I Open My Eyes	À peine j'ouvre les yeux	Leyla Bouzid
2016 (21st)	Next Year	L'Année prochaine	Vania Leturcq
2016 (21st)	The Rooftops	Les Terrasses	Merzak Allouache
2016 (21st)	The Brand New Testament	Le Tout Nouveau Testament	Jaco Van Dormael
2016 (21st)	La Vanité		Lionel Baier
2017 (22nd)
2017 (22nd)	Hedi		Mohammed Ben Attia
2017 (22nd)	Belgica		Felix Van Groeningen
2017 (22nd)	The Unknown Girl	La Fille inconnue	Jean-Pierre and Luc Dardenne
2017 (22nd)	It's Only the End of the World	Juste la fin du monde	Xavier Dolan
2017 (22nd)	Mimosas		Oliver Laxe
2017 (22nd)	The First, the Last	Les Premiers, les Derniers	Bouli Lanners
2018 (23rd)
2018 (23rd)	Insyriated	Une famille syrienne	Philippe Van Leeuw
2018 (23rd)	Before Summer Ends	Avant la fin de l’été	Maryam Goormaghtigh
2018 (23rd)	Beauty and the Dogs	La Belle et la Meute	Kaouther Ben Hania
2018 (23rd)	A Wedding	Noces	Stephan Streker
2018 (23rd)	Lost in Paris	Paris pieds nus	Dominique Abel and Fiona Gordon
2019 (24th)
2019 (24th)	Girl		Lukas Dhont
2019 (24th)	Capernaum		Nadine Labaki
2019 (24th)	Chris the Swiss		Anja Kofmel
2019 (24th)	The Insult	L'Insulte	Ziad Doueiri
2019 (24th)	Our Struggles	Nos batailles	Guillaume Senez

== See also ==
- César Award for Best Foreign Film
