= Miraculum =

- Film poster
- Directed by: Daniel Grou
- Screenplay by: Gabriel Sabourin
- Produced by: Pierre Even; Marie-Claude Poulin
- Starring: Marilyn Castonguay; Xavier Dolan; Anne Dorval; Julien Poulin
- Cinematography: Claudine Sauvé
- Edited by: Valérie Héroux
- Music by: Luc Boudrias
- Production company: Item 7
- Distributed by: Les Films Séville
- Release date: February 28, 2014 (RVCQ)
- Running time: 110 minutes
- Country: Canada
- Language: French

Miraculum is a Canadian drama film, directed by Daniel Grou and released on February 28, 2014.

== Synopsis ==
The film follows the development of different stories at the same time. Simon (played by Gabriel Sabourin) finally returns to his home country after spending years abroad. He does so illegally entering with drugs, that he believes will help him fix a mistake he committed a while ago. Raymond (played by Julien Poulin) plans a trip with his mistress, she however refuses to leave her husband. Martin (played by Robin Aubert) lies to his wife (played by Anne Dorval) on the eve of their trip and goes spend the night in a casino. Lastly, it depict the soul tearing dilemma Étienne (Xavier Dolan) faces as a Jéhovah's witness living with leukemia. His fiancée, who also shares his faith, deals with a similar situation went she needs to attend to a plane crash survivor.

== Cast ==
- Marilyn Castonguay : Julie
- Gabriel Sabourin : Simon
- Robin Aubert : Martin
- Xavier Dolan : Étienne
- Julien Poulin : Raymond
- Louise Turcot : Louise
- Anne Dorval : Évelyne
- Gilbert Sicotte : Louise's husband

== Accolades ==
The film received two Jutra Award nominations at the 17th Jutra Awards in 2015, for Best Supporting Actor (Aubert) and Best Hair (Ann-Louise Landry).

It was shortlisted for the Prix collégial du cinéma québécois in 2015.
