= The Death & Life of John F. Donovan =

2018 film by Xavier Dolan

- Theatrical release poster
- Directed by: Xavier Dolan
- Written by: Xavier Dolan; Jacob Tierney
- Based on: An original idea by Xavier Dolan
- Produced by: Lyse Lafontaine; Nancy Grant; Xavier Dolan; Michel Merkt
- Starring: Kit Harington; Natalie Portman; Jacob Tremblay; Susan Sarandon; Kathy Bates; Thandiwe Newton (Note: Credited as "Thandie Newton"); Ben Schnetzer; Amara Karan; Chris Zylka; Jared Keeso; Emily Hampshire; Sarah Gadon; Michael Gambon
- Cinematography: André Turpin
- Edited by: Xavier Dolan; Mathieu Denis
- Music by: Gabriel Yared
- Production companies: Lyla Films; Sons of Manual
- Distributed by: Les Films Séville (Canada)
- Release dates: September 10, 2018 (TIFF); August 23, 2019 (Canada)
- Running time: 123 minutes
- Countries: Canada; United Kingdom
- Language: English
- Box office: $3.3 million

The Death & Life of John F. Donovan is a 2018 drama film directed, co-written, produced, and edited by Xavier Dolan, in his English-language debut. The film stars Kit Harington, Jacob Tremblay, Natalie Portman, Susan Sarandon, Kathy Bates, Thandiwe Newton, Ben Schnetzer, Amara Karan, Chris Zylka, Jared Keeso, Emily Hampshire, Sarah Gadon, and Michael Gambon. It deals with themes of celebrity, tabloid media in Hollywood, mother-son relationships, and homosexuality.

It is presented as three different sequences of scenes interspersed during the film: a series set in 2017 showing a young actor who reminisces about the written correspondence he shared as a child with an American TV star who died since then, and two other series set in the mid-2000s depicting the lives of both characters at the time of the correspondence.

The Death & Life of John F. Donovan had its world premiere at the 2018 Toronto International Film Festival. The film received generally negative reviews, with many critics describing it as Dolan's worst directorial effort, despite some praise for its cast.

== Plot ==
In 2017, Times journalist Audrey Newhouse interviews popular actor Rupert Turner about his recently published book Letters to a Young Actor. The book collects letters he received from John F. Donovan, an actor he corresponded with as a child and who died from a drug overdose.

In a flashback to the mid-2000s, Turner is a child actor who is bullied by homophobic schoolmates and emotionally abused by his mother. Turner idolizes Donovan, who plays the lead character in the teen drama series Hellsome High. The tabloid press frequently speculates that Donovan is gay and closeted; when gossip regarding Donovan soliciting male prostitutes makes headlines, his correspondence with Turner is made public, sparking malicious speculation about the nature of Turner and Donovan's relationship. Donovan writes his final letter to Turner, and dies shortly after.

In the present, Turner says he does not know whether or not Donovan's death was related to the scandal. Newhouse muses that she initially dismissed Turner's book as "mishaps from the First World," but has reconsidered based on their meeting.

== Cast ==
- Kit Harington as John F. Donovan
- Natalie Portman as Sam Turner
- Ben Schnetzer as Rupert Turner
  - Jacob Tremblay as young Rupert Turner
- Susan Sarandon as Grace Donovan
- Kathy Bates as Barbara Haggermaker
- Thandiwe Newton as Audrey Newhouse (credited as Thandie Newton)
- Amara Karan as Miss Kureshi
- Jared Keeso as James Donovan
- Chris Zylka as Will Jefford Jr.
- Sarah Gadon as Liz Jones
- Emily Hampshire as Amy Bosworth
- Michael Gambon as Man in Diner
  - Gambon also voices the narrator
- Gijs Blom as Rupert's boyfriend

== Production ==
In December 2014, it was announced that Kit Harington and Jessica Chastain would star in the film, with Xavier Dolan directing the film from a screenplay he wrote with Jacob Tierney. Harington would portray the titular character while Chastain would portray a journalist. That same month, it was announced Susan Sarandon and Kathy Bates had joined the cast of the film. Sarandon would portray the role of Donovan's mother, while Bates would portray the role of his manager.

In November 2015, it was announced that Adele was in talks to appear in a cameo role. That same month, Michael Gambon, Bella Thorne, Chris Zylka, Emily Hampshire, and Jared Keeso joined the cast of the film. In February 2016, Natalie Portman, Nicholas Hoult and Thandiwe Newton joined the cast. In July 2016, it was announced Ben Schnetzer joined the cast of the film, replacing Hoult. In February 2017, it was announced Jacob Tremblay had been cast in the film. In June 2017, Amara Karan joined the cast of the film.

Gabriel Yared composed the film's score, which was recorded in July 2017.

=== Filming ===
Principal photography began on July 9, 2016, in Montreal. The first block of principal photography concluded on September 3, 2016. In February 2017, production resumed in Montreal, before being completed in the spring of 2017 in London and Prague.

=== Post-production ===
In February 2018, Dolan confirmed via Instagram that during post-production, Chastain's character had been cut from the film for timing and pacing reasons. In an interview in October 2018, Bella Thorne mentioned she had filmed some scenes, but they were with Chastain's character and thus were cut from the film.

== Release ==
The film was invited to premiere at the 2018 Cannes Film Festival in May, but (according to artistic director Thierry Fremaux), Dolan still was not happy with the film, and opted to continue editing. The film later had its world premiere at the Toronto International Film Festival on September 10, 2018. This was Dolan's first film to have a world premiere at TIFF.

The film was released in France on March 13, 2019, in Canada by Les Films Séville on August 23, and in the United States on December 13, 2019, by Momentum Pictures.

== Reception ==
On Rotten Tomatoes it has an approval rating of 19% based on 32 reviews, with an average rating of 3.7/10. The site's critical consensus reads, "The Death and Life of John F. Donovan finds writer-director Xavier Dolan flailing at profundity with a technically assured drama that never makes sense of its own ideas." On Metacritic, the film holds a score of 28 out of 100 based on reviews from 12 critics, indicating "generally unfavorable reviews".

IndieWire dubbed the film the "worst" of Dolan's career; they also called the screenplay "soapy" and "clumsy". The Guardian gave the film one out of five stars, deeming it a "dubious mess". NOW Magazine called the film "mediocre at best". RogerEbert.com criticized Dolan's music choices and wrote that the film has "major flaws", but praised Tremblay's performance. The Hollywood Reporter called the cast "impressive", but called the film a "half-baked, cumbersome, overlong psychodrama".

In a positive review, Screen International wrote that the film "may revisit a lot of familiar territory for Dolan but on this form it is good to welcome him home."
