= The Little Queen =

- Film poster
- La Petite Reine
- Directed by: Alexis Durand-Brault
- Written by: Sophie Lorain; Catherine Léger
- Produced by: Richard Lalonde
- Starring: Laurence Leboeuf; Patrice Robitaille
- Cinematography: Yves Bélanger
- Edited by: Louis-Philippe Rathé
- Music by: Sari Dajani; Pierre-Luc Rioux; Marc-André Sauvageau; Rudy Toussaint
- Production company: Forum Films
- Release date: June 13, 2014
- Running time: 108 minutes
- Country: Canada
- Language: French

The Little Queen (French: La Petite Reine) is a Canadian sports drama film, directed by Alexis Durand-Brault and released in 2014. Based on the true story of cyclist Geneviève Jeanson, whose career as a professional cyclist was derailed by a doping scandal, the film stars Laurence Leboeuf as Julie Arseneau, a cyclist who is caught doping just a few races short of the championship race, and Patrice Robitaille as her coach.

The film premiered theatrically in June 2014.

The film received four Prix Jutra nominations at the 17th Jutra Awards, for Best Actor (Robitaille), Best Actress (Leboeuf), Best Sound (Mario Auclair, Stéphane Bergeron, Marcel Pothier and Christian Rivest) and Best Editing (Louis-Philippe Rathé).
