= Anne Dorval =

Franco-Canadian actress

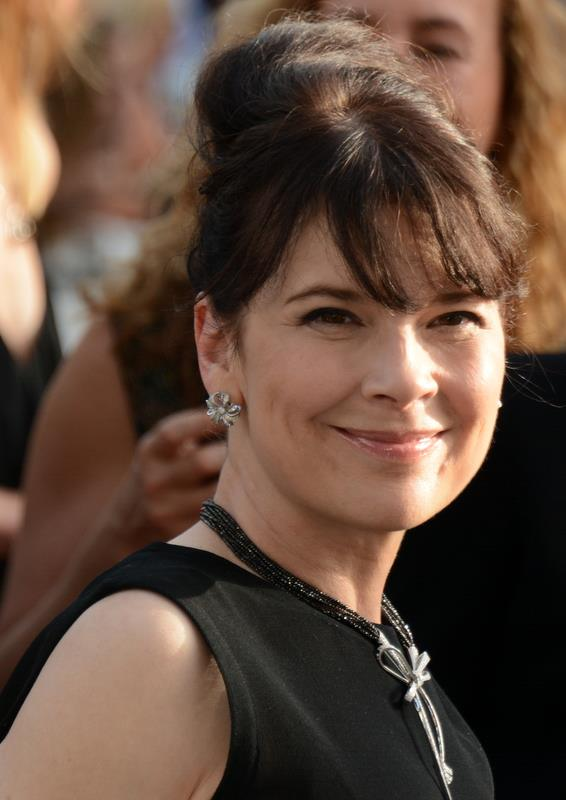
- Anne Dorval at the 2015 Cannes Film Festival
- Born: Noranda, Quebec, Canada
- Occupation: Actress
- Years active: 1989–present

Anne Dorval (French pronunciation: [an dɔʁval]) is a French Canadian television, stage, and film actress. She is known for her work with Xavier Dolan that includes appearing in five of his films, I Killed My Mother (2009), Heartbeats (2010), Laurence Anyways (2012), Mommy (2014) and Matthias & Maxime (2019).

== Early life and education ==
Anne Dorval was born in Noranda, Quebec, the daughter of Madeleine (Larouche) and Gaetan Dorval.

She received her education at Cégep de Trois-Rivières and the Drama Conservatory of Montreal, beginning her career on the stage in 1984.

== Career ==
Dorval is known in Canada for her appearance in the Quebec television series Le Coeur a ses raisons and Les Parent. She has also appeared in other Quebec series, such as Chambres en ville, Virginie, Paparazzi and Rumeurs, and in the films Montréal vu par... and I Killed My Mother (J'ai tué ma mère). She is also known as a premiere French Canadian voice actress for English films.

In 2010, at the Palm Springs International Film Festival, she won the FIPRESCI Award for Best Actress for her performance in I Killed My Mother (J'ai tué ma mère) directed by Xavier Dolan.

In 2024, she was announced as one of the judges on Quel talent!, the forthcoming Quebec version of the international Got Talent franchise.

== Filmography ==
| Year | Title | Role | Notes |
|---|---|---|---|
| 1989–96 | Chambres en ville | Lola Corbeil | TV series (172 episodes); Nominated - Gémeaux Award for Best Actress - Soap Opera (1992); Nominated - Gémeaux Award for Best Actress - Soap Opera (1993); Nominated - Gémeaux Award for Best Actress - Soap Opera (1996) |
| 1990 | Ding et Dong | Joëlle | |
| 1991 | Montreal Stories | Sarah | |
| 1992 | Montréal rétro | | |
| 1992 | L'or et le papier | Zoé Laflamme | TV series (13 episodes); Nominated - Gémeaux Award for Best Supporting Actress |
| 1996–2002 | Virginie | Lucie Chabot | TV series (215 episodes) |
| 1997 | L'enfant des Appalaches | Maïna | TV movie |
| 1997 | Paparazzi | Jocelyne Lamarre | TV series (11 episodes) |
| 2003–2004 | Rumeurs | Valérie | TV series (26 episodes) |
| 2004 | Grande ourse | Catherine Laplante | TV series (1 episode); Nominated - Gémeaux Award for Best Actress - Dramatic |
| 2005 | Détect inc. | Cynthia | TV series (8 episodes) |
| 2005–2007 | Le cœur a ses raisons | Criquette / Ashley Rockwell | TV series (39 episodes); Gémeaux Award for Best Actress - Comedy (2005); Gémeaux Award for Best Actress - Comedy (2006); Nominated - Gémeaux Award for Best Actress - Comedy (2008) |
| 2006 | The Secret Life of Happy People | Florence | |
| 2007 | Super Phoenix | The unemployed | Short |
| 2008 | Waitresses Wanted | Milagro's mother | |
| 2008 | Chez Jules | Diane | TV series (1 episode) |
| 2008–2016 | Les Parent | Natalie Rivard | TV series (169 episodes); Nominated - Gémeaux Award for Best Actress - Comedy (2009); Nominated - Monte-Carlo Television Festival - Outstanding Actress in a Comedy Series (2012); Nominated - Monte-Carlo Television Festival - Outstanding Actress in a Comedy Series (2013) |
| 2009 | I Killed My Mother | Chantale Lemming | Jutra Award for Best Actress; Festival International du Film Francophone de Namur - Golden Bayard for Best Actress; Palm Springs International Film Festival - FIPRESCI Prize for Best Actress; Nominated - Chlotrudis Award for Best Actress; Nominated - Vancouver Film Critics Circle Award for Best Actress in a Canadian Film |
| 2009 | Grande ourse - La clé des possibles | Catherine Laplante | |
| 2010 | Heartbeats | Désirée | |
| 2011 | A Sense of Humour | Stéphanie | |
| 2012 | Laurence Anyways | Marthe Delteuil | |
| 2012–2013 | Les Bobos | Sandrine Maxou | TV series (36 episodes) |
| 2013 | An Extraordinary Person | Guylaine | Short |
| 2014 | Mommy | Diane 'Die' Després | Canadian Screen Award for Best Actress; Chlotrudis Award for Best Actress; Film Club's The Lost Weekend - Best Actress; Italian Online Movie Award for Best Actress; Jutra Award for Best Actress; Palm Springs International Film Festival - FIPRESCI Prize for Best Actress; Nominated - Cinema Bloggers Award for Best Actress - International Competition; Nominated - Críticos de Cinema Online Portugueses Award for Best Actress; Nominated - Dorian Award for Film Performance of the Year - Actress; Nominated - IndieWire Critic's Poll - Best Lead Actress; Nominated - International Cinephile Society Award for Best Actress; Nominated - International Cinephile Society Award for Best Ensemble; Nominated - International Online Cinema Award for Best Actress; Nominated - Italian Online Movie Award for Best Cast; Nominated - Online Film Critics Society Award for Best Actress; Nominated - Satellite Award for Best Actress – Motion Picture; Nominated - Vancouver Film Critics Circle Award for Best Actress in a Canadian Film |
| 2014 | Miraculum | Evelyne | |
| 2014 | Le Coq de St-Victor | Florence | |
| 2016 | Heal the Living | Claire Méjean | |
| 2017 | Jalouse | Sophie | |
| 2018 | 14 Days, 12 Nights | Isabelle Brodeur | |
| 2019 | Matthias & Maxime | Manon | |
| 2022 | The Night Logan Woke Up | Madeleine Larouche | |
| 2023 | Through the Night | | |
