= Lyse Lafontaine =

Canadian film producer (born 1942)

- Born: 1942 (age 83–84)
- Education: Université de Montréal
- Occupation: Film producer
- Awards: Prix Iris Hommage

Lyse Lafontaine (born 1942) is a Canadian film producer known for working with directors Jean-Claude Lauzon and Xavier Dolan. She works at Lyla Films in Montreal, Quebec, Canada.

== Early life ==
Born to La Presse reporter Gaston Lafontaine, Lyse studied literature at the Université de Montréal and earned her degree. She married Stéphane Venne and managed the rock band Offenbach in 1972. She became a stage manager on the 1974 film The Apprenticeship of Duddy Kravitz, and married her second husband, moving to The Bahamas for two years before returning to Canada.

== Career ==
In 1976, Lafontaine served as location manager for the film The Little Girl Who Lives Down the Lane, starring Jodie Foster. Lafontaine met Lauzon when he was pitching his screenplay for Léolo (1992), which other producers had rejected. It became the first film she produced, with Aimée Danis, for which they were nominated for the Genie Award for Best Motion Picture. While in Italy during filming, Lauzon gave Lafontaine a letter thanking her for her ineptitude in business, which he considered necessary to make a film with feeling. She kept it as a cherished keepsake.

Working with Dolan, she produced Laurence Anyways (2012) and served as an associate producer for Mommy (2014). Dolan's Laurence Anyways was inspired by Lafontaine's ex-girlfriend Luce Baillairgé, the mother of her son Mikaël, who had a small part in Léolo. With Dolan, she personally traveled to London in 2017 to work on his The Death and Life of John F. Donovan.

In 2015, Lafontaine produced La Passion d’Augustine with François Tremblay, winning the Québec Cinéma Award for Best Film. On 1 June 2017 at the 19th Quebec Cinema Awards, she was awarded the Iris Hommage for 30 years of contributions to Quebec cinema.

== Filmography ==
Her films include:

- The Decline of the American Empire (1986)
- Jesus of Montreal (1989)
- Léolo (1992)
- A Sunday in Kigali (2006)
- Mommy Is at the Hairdresser's (2009)
- Barney's Version (2010)
- Laurence Anyways (2012)
- Mommy (2014)
- Love Project (2014)
- The Passion of Augustine (2015)
- A Bag of Marbles (2017)
- Worst Case, We Get Married (2017)
- The Death and Life of John F. Donovan (2018)
- Hotel Silence (2024)
