= Suzanne Clément =

Canadian actress

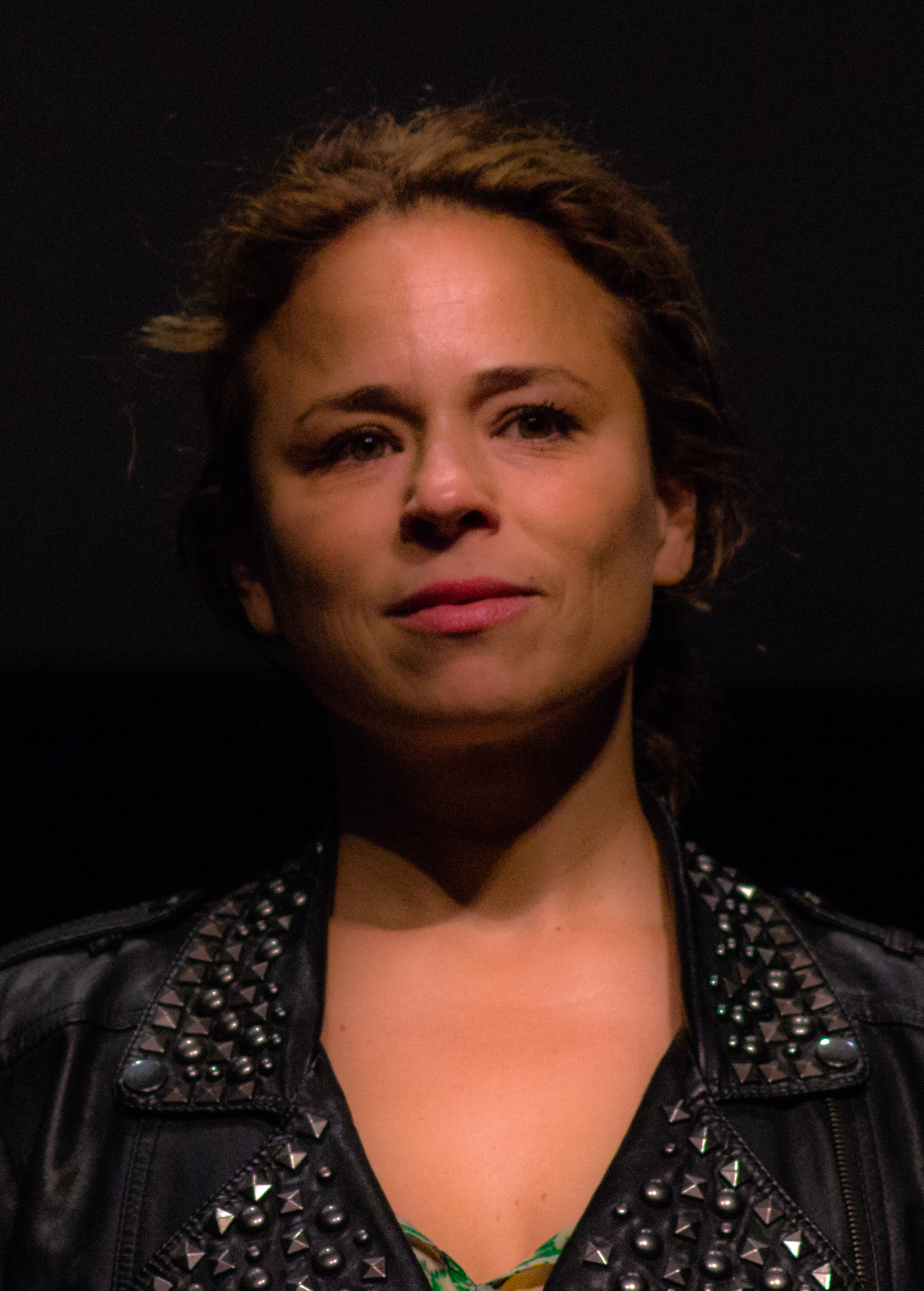
- Clément in 2012
- Born: 12 May 1969 (age 57); Montreal, Quebec, Canada
- Occupation: Actress
- Years active: 1992–present

Suzanne Clément (born 12 May 1969) is a Canadian actress. She is known for her work in Xavier Dolan's arthouse films I Killed My Mother (2009), Laurence Anyways (2012), and Mommy (2014).

== Career ==
She started her career in 1992, with a recurring part in the Canadian TV series Watatatow.

A couple of years later, she made her cinema debut with The Confessional, directed by Robert Lepage and starring Kristin Scott Thomas.

She's well known for her recurring roles on television. From 1995 to 2000, she played Geneviève Bordeleau in the TV series Les machos and from 1997 to 2001, she played Martine Julien on the show Sous le signe du lion.

She returned to the big screen in 1998, with the movie 2 Seconds, directed by Manon Briand.

With Émilie Dequenne, she shared the Un Certain Regard Award for Best Actress at the 2012 Cannes Film Festival for her starring role in Laurence Anyways. She was also nominated for Best Actress at the 1st Canadian Screen Awards for the same performance.

In 2019, she landed a role on the play L'Heureux Stratagème, written by Marivaux and directed by Ladislas Chollat, starring alongside Éric Elmosnino and Sylvie Testud.

== Filmography ==
Year	Title	Role	Notes
1992-96	Watatatow	Isabelle Bélanger	TV series
1995	The Confessional	Rachel	
1995	Scoop IV	Young graduate	TV series (1 episode)
1995-2000	Les machos	Geneviève Bordeleau	TV series (122 episodes)
1997-2001	Sous le signe du lion	Martine Julien	TV series (26 episodes)
1997	Cher Olivier	The cheerleader	TV series (1 episode)
1998	2 Seconds	La Bella	
1998	Viens dehors !	Marie	Short
1999	The Long Winter	Angèle Bouchard	
1999	Opération Tango	Nicou Langlois	
1999	Atomic Saké	Véronique	Short
1999-2000	Un gars, une fille	Suzanne	TV series (3 episodes)
2000	Le regard de Delphine	Annick	TV movie
2000	L'ombre de l'épervier II	Louise Beaupré	TV series (10 episodes)
2001	Side Orders	Hélène	Short
2001	La vie, la vie	Valérie	TV series (4 episodes)
2002	Jean Duceppe	Hélène Rowley	TV mini-series
2004	Smash	Natacha	TV mini-series
2004	Grande ourse	Hélène Marcoux	TV series (1 episode)
2005	Audition	Suzie	Nominated - Canadian Screen Award for Best Supporting Actress; Nominated - Prix Iris for Best Actress
2005	Trudeau II : Maverick in the Making	Mercédès	TV movie
2005	Cover Girl	Camille Langlois	TV series (6 episodes)
2006-09	Les Hauts et les bas de Sophie Paquin	Sophie Paquin	TV series (45 Episodes); Gémeaux Award for Best Actress - Comedy (2007); Gémeaux Award for Best Actress - Comedy (2008); Nominated - Gémeaux Award for Best Actress - Comedy (2009); Nominated - Gémeaux Award for Best Actress - Comedy (2010)
2007	Twilight	Zoé	Nominated - Prix Iris for Best Supporting Actress
2008	It's Not Me, I Swear!	Madeleine Doré	Vancouver Film Critics Circle Award for Best Supporting Actress in a Canadian Film; Nominated - Prix Iris for Best Actress
2008	Express	Louise Stevens	Short
2009	Women Interrupted	Lea	
2009	I Killed My Mother	Julie Cloutier	
2010	Silence Lies	Viviane	Nominated - Prix Iris for Best Actress
2010	Y'en aura pas de facile	Christine	
2010	Les Rescapés	Consuela	TV series (1 episode)
2012	Laurence Anyways	Frédérique Belair	Cannes Film Festival - Un Certain Regard - Best Actress; RiverRun International Film Festival - Best Actress; Nominated - Canadian Screen Award for Best Actress; Nominated - Dublin Film Critics' Circle - Best Actress; Nominated - Prix Iris for Best Actress; Nominated - Vancouver Film Critics Circle Award for Best Actress in a Canadian Film
2012-13	Unité 9	Shandy Galarneau	TV series (25 episodes)
2013	Amsterdam	Madeleine	
2014	Fall	Catherine Merchant	
2014	To Life	Rose	
2014	Mommy	Kyla	Canadian Screen Award for Best Supporting Actress; International Cinephile Society Award for Best Supporting Actress; Prix Iris for Best Supporting Actress; Vancouver Film Critics Circle Award for Best Supporting Actress in a Canadian Film; Nominated - Chlotrudis Award for Best Supporting Actress; Nominated - Online Film Critics Society Award for Best Supporting Actress
2014	Sitting on the Edge of Marlene	Marlene Bell	
2015	My Internship in Canada	Suzanne Guibord	Nominated - Vancouver Film Critics Circle Award for Best Supporting Actress in a Canadian Film
2016	Jailbirds	Anita Lopes	
2016	Early Winter	Maya	Nominated - Australian Film Critics Association Award for Best Actress
2016	The Other Half	Marie	
2016	The First, the Last	Clara	
2017	C'est la vie!	Josiane	
2017	Number One	Véra Jacob	
2017	Endangered Species	Edith Kaufman	
2017	Des plans sur la comète	Michèle	
2017	La Forêt	Virginie Musso	TV mini-series
2017	Versailles	Madame Agathe	TV series (9 episodes); Nominated - Canadian Screen Award for Best Supporting Actress in a Drama Program or Series
2018	Birthmarked	Dr. Julie Bouchard	
2018	Nothing to Hide	Charlotte	
2018	The Child Remains	Rae	
2018	Le rire de ma mère	Marie	
2019	Saul at Night	Amalur	
2019	Raoul Taburin	Madeleine	
2020	Inhuman Resources	Nicole Delambre	TV mini-series
2020	Vampires	Martha Radescu	TV series (6 episodes)
2021	Flashback	George Sand	
2021	Les fantasmes	Louise Lebrun	
2021	Death of a Ladies' Man	Geneviève Gagnon-O'Shea	
2021	The Rope	Agnès Mueller	TV mini-series
2021	Bulle	Jeanne	TV series (6 episodes)
2022	The Origin of Evil	Stéphane Marson	
2022-	STAT	Emmanuelle St-Cyr	TV series (260 episodes); Gémeaux Award for Best Leading Role in a Daily Drama Series
2023	Ailleurs si j'y suis	Catherine	
2024	Longing	Rachel	Post-Production
2024	Family Pack	Marie	
2024	The Sticky	Inspector Olivia Nadeau	TV series Post-Production
2026	Pauline (Pauline Julien: femme pays)	Pauline Julien	

== Theatre ==
Year	Title	Author	Director
1993	The Hunchback of Notre-Dame	Victor Hugo	Guy Freixe
1995	The Miser	Molière	Luc Durand
1998	La grande magia	Eduardo de Felipo	Serge Denoncourt
1998	C’était avant la guerre à l’anse-à-gilles	Marie Laberge	Monique Duceppe
1999	An Ideal Husband	Oscar Wilde	Serge Denoncourt
1999	Je suis une mouette (non ce n’est pas ça)	Anton Chekhov	Serge Denoncourt
2000	The Cherry Orchard	Anton Chekhov	Serge Denoncourt
2001	Three Sisters	Anton Chekhov	Luce Pelletier & Denis Bernard
2001	Steel Magnolias	Robert Harling	Monique Duceppe
2004	Elektra	Hugo von Hofmannsthal	Luce Pelletier
2004	La sirène et le harpon	Pierre-Yves Lemieux	Pierre-Yves Lemieux
2005	Jouliks	Marie-Christine Lê-Huu	Robert Bellefeuille
2019-20	L’Heureux Stratagème	Pierre de Marivaux	Ladislas Chollat
