= Michel Marc Bouchard =

Canadian playwright

Michel Marc Bouchard, OC CQ (born February 2, 1958) is a Canadian playwright. He has received the Prix Journal de Montreal, Prix du Cercle des critiques de l'Outaouais, the Dora Mavor Moore Award for Outstanding New Play, the Floyd S. Chalmers Canadian Play Award, and nine Jessie Richardson Theatre Awards for the Vancouver productions of Lilies and The Orphan Muses.

== Early life ==
Born in Saint-Cœur-de-Marie, Quebec, he studied theatre the University of Ottawa.

== Career ==
Bouchard made his professional playwriting debut in 1983 and since then has written more than 25 plays, including The Coronation Voyage (Le voyage du Couronnement), Down Dangerous Passes Road (Le chemin des Passes-dangereuses), and Written on Water (Les manuscrits du déluge). In 1993, Bouchard and his theatre company Les deux mondes were awarded the National Arts Centre Award, a companion award of the Governor General's Performing Arts Awards.

His best-known work, the play Lilies, was produced as the movie Lilies by John Greyson; the film won a Genie Award in 1996.

Bouchard's play The Orphan Muses (Les Muses orphelines), was adapted as a film in 2000 by Robert Favreau. His play The Madonna Painter (Le Peintre des madones) has been translated into English and in 2010 was being performed in Canadian venues and receiving favorable reviews. It premiered in Toronto at the Factory Theatre, November 19, 2009.

Bouchard's play Tom at the Farm (Tom à la ferme) premiered at the Théâtre d'Aujourd'hui in 2011. The play was adapted as a film in 2013 by Xavier Dolan.

In 2012, Bouchard was made a Knight of the National Order of Quebec. In 2021 he was named the recipient of Quebec's Prix Athanase-David for lifetime achievement in literature.

His 2019 play La nuit où Laurier Gaudreault s'est réveillé was adapted for television by Xavier Dolan as The Night Logan Woke Up.

Bouchard has also written the libretti for three operas.

- Les Feluettes is based on his play of the same name (Lilies in English). The music was composed by Kevin March, and the opera was a co-commission and co-production of Opéra de Montréal and Pacific Opera Victoria. The world première production was presented in Montreal in May 2016 and in Victoria in April 2017.
- La beauté du monde, produced by Opéra de Montréal, with music by Julien Bilodeau, premièred in November 2022.
- La Reine-garçon, based on Bouchard’s 2012 play Christine, la reine-garçon, was co-commissioned and co-produced by Opéra de Montréal and the Canadian Opera Company, with music composed by Julien Bilodeau. It was staged in Montreal in February 2024 and in Toronto a year later.

In 2023 he was named the recipient of the Blue Metropolis Violet Prize for LGBTQ writers.

We'll Find Happiness (On sera heureux), Bouchard's first original screenplay not adapted from one of his own theatrical plays, went into production in 2024 under the direction of Léa Pool, and is slated for release in 2025.
