= Laurence Anyways =

2012 film

- Official theatrical poster
- Directed by: Xavier Dolan
- Written by: Xavier Dolan
- Produced by: Charles Gillibert; Nathanaël Karmitz; Lyse Lafontaine
- Starring: Melvil Poupaud; Suzanne Clément
- Cinematography: Yves Bélanger
- Edited by: Xavier Dolan
- Music by: Noia
- Production companies: Lyla Films; MK2
- Distributed by: Alliance VivaFilm
- Release dates: 18 May 2012 (Cannes); 18 July 2012 (France); 13 September 2012 (TIFF)
- Running time: 168 minutes
- Country: Canada
- Language: French

Laurence Anyways is a 2012 Canadian epic romantic drama film written, directed and edited by Xavier Dolan. The film competed in the Un Certain Regard section at the 2012 Cannes Film Festival where Suzanne Clément won the Un Certain Regard Award for Best Actress. Laurence Anyways also won the Queer Palm Award at the festival.

At the 2012 Toronto International Film Festival, Laurence Anyways won the award for Best Canadian Feature Film. The film also received ten nominations at the 1st Canadian Screen Awards, including Best Motion Picture, Best Direction for Dolan, Best Actor in a Leading Role for Poupaud, Best Actress in a Leading Role for Clément, and Best Screenplay for Dolan.

== Plot ==
The film begins by introducing 35-year old Laurence Alia (Melvil Poupaud), an award-winning novelist and literature teacher in Montreal, Quebec. Laurence is very much in love with his girlfriend, the fiery and passionate Frédérique - "Fred" - Bellair (Suzanne Clément). On the day of Fred's birthday, Laurence reveals to Fred his biggest secret; he has felt his entire life that he was born in the wrong body and says that he has been living a lie for so many years. He wishes to rectify the situation and restart his life as a woman. Fred accuses him of being gay and takes the news very hard.

They separate for a short time, but Fred arrives at the conclusion, much to the chagrin of her mother and sister, that she must be there for Laurence. Their romance resumes and Fred becomes Laurence's biggest supporter. Fred teaches Laurence how to do her own makeup and buys her a wig. She urges Laurence to dress as her true self, in female clothing. Laurence shows up to work one day in a dress. All seemingly goes well until the school board fires her from her position at the school due to the negative reception of her transition. Fred, suffering from career disappointments and a surprise pregnancy that she quietly chooses to abort, falls into a state of depression and eventually leaves Laurence and moves away. Fred marries a man, Albert, and has a son named Leo.

Five years later, Laurence, although living with and romantically engaged with Charlotte, is still deeply in love with Fred. She stalks her regularly, often driving and parking outside of her house in Trois-Rivières. After publishing her book of poems, she sends a copy to Fred, who decodes the poems' secret message meant for her. She contacts Laurence, and the two meet and run away to the Isle of Black. However, the romantic getaway turns sour and the two argue. Fred reveals she was pregnant when Laurence revealed her gender identity, and Fred had an abortion. Fred's husband learns her whereabouts from Charlotte and Fred's relationship and life with him is shattered. Laurence leaves Fred in the night and the two do not speak for several years.

Whilst Laurence is being interviewed for her biography, the interviewer inquires about Fred, after having listened to the couple's story. Laurence admits that she recently reconnected with Fred, newly divorced, but their meeting did not go well. She tells the interviewer that she has chosen to age as a woman. The final scene shows the circumstances under which Fred and Laurence first met, on a commercial set, Laurence having been bet to talk to Fred.

== Cast ==
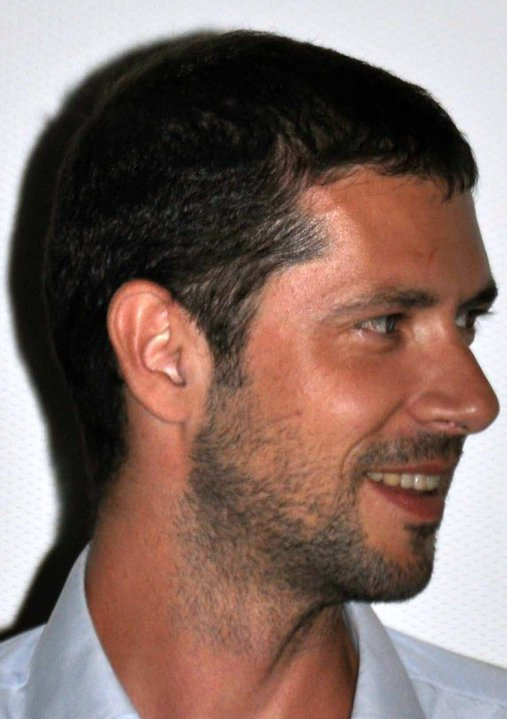
Melvil Poupaud stars as Laurence.

- Melvil Poupaud as Laurence Alia
- Suzanne Clément as Frédérique "Fred" Bellair
- Nathalie Baye as Julienne Alia
- Monia Chokri as Stéfie Bellair
- Susie Almgren as Journalist
- Yves Jacques as Michel Lafortune
- Anne-Élisabeth Bossé as Mélanie
- Anne Dorval as Marthe Delteuil
- Sophie Faucher as Andrée Bellair
- Magalie Lépine-Blondeau as Charlotte
- David Savard as Albert
- Catherine Bégin as Mama Rose
- Emmanuel Schwartz as Baby Rose
- Jacques Lavallée as Dada Rose
- Perette Souplex as Tatie Rose
- Patricia Tulasne as Shookie Rose
- Éric Bruneau as Mathieu

== Production ==
Director Xavier Dolan was inspired to write Laurence Anyways upon hearing of the story of Luce Baillairgé. At the time, Dolan was unaware his producer, Lyse Lafontaine, had been Baillairgé's girlfriend and that they had a son, Mikaël. Lafontaine sought the consent of Baillairgé and Baillairgé's children before making the film.

Melvil Poupaud took the role of Laurence. Despite not being familiar with Dolan's filmography, Poupaud found Dolan to be an interesting character, and said he was hoping for such a role in his acting career.

Baillairgé died of a heart attack before Laurence Anyways was completed and released. It is dedicated to her.

== Release and reception ==
Laurence Anyways was released in the United Kingdom by Network Releasing. It was theatrically released on 30 November 2012, and on DVD on 25 March 2013. The film was released theatrically in the United States on 28 June 2013 by Breaking Glass Pictures and was released on DVD and Blu-ray on 8 October 2013.

Laurence Anyways received mostly positive reviews from critics. It holds an approval rating of 84% percent based on 63 reviews in the film critics website Rotten Tomatoes, with the general consensus being "Passionate and powerfully acted, Laurence Anyways sometimes strains to achieve its narrative ambitions (and fill its three-hour running time), but ultimately succeeds." The average rating is 7/10.

== Accolades ==
Award	Category	Recipient(s)	Result	Ref(s)
Cannes Film Festival	Queer Palm	Xavier Dolan	Won	
Cannes Film Festival	Un Certain Regard - Best Actress	Suzanne Clément	Won	
Cannes Film Festival	Un Certain Regard Award	Xavier Dolan	Nominated	
César Awards	Best Foreign Film	Xavier Dolan	Nominated	
Canadian Screen Awards	Best Motion Picture	Lyse Lafontaine	Nominated	
Canadian Screen Awards	Best Director	Xavier Dolan	Nominated	
Canadian Screen Awards	Best Actor	Melvil Poupaud	Nominated	
Canadian Screen Awards	Best Actress	Suzanne Clément	Nominated	
Canadian Screen Awards	Best Screenplay	Xavier Dolan	Nominated	
Canadian Screen Awards	Best Original Score	Noia	Nominated	
Canadian Screen Awards	Best Costume Design	Xavier Dolan, François Barbeau	Won	
Canadian Screen Awards	Best Makeup	Colleen Quinton, Kathy Kelso, Michelle Côté, Martin Lapointe	Won	
Canadian Screen Awards	Best Sound Editing	Sylvain Brassard, Stéphane Cadotte, Isabelle Favreau and Philippe Racine	Nominated	
Canadian Screen Awards	Art Direction/Production Design	Anne Pritchard	Nominated	
Dorian Awards	Film of the Year	Laurence Anyways	Nominated	
Guldbagge Award	Best Foreign Film	Xavier Dolan	Nominated	
Jutra Award	Best Film	Charles Gillibert, Nathanaël Karmitz, Lyse Lafontaine	Nominated	
Jutra Award	Best Direction	Xavier Dolan	Nominated	
Jutra Award	Best Actress	Suzanne Clément	Nominated	
Jutra Award	Best Supporting Actress	Nathalie Baye	Nominated	
Jutra Award	Best Supporting Actress	Monia Chokri	Nominated	
Jutra Award	Best Screenplay	Xavier Dolan	Nominated	
Jutra Award	Best Cinematography	Yves Bélanger	Nominated	
Jutra Award	Best Art Direction	Anne Pritchard	Won	
Jutra Award	Best Hairstyling	Michelle Côté, Martin Lapointe	Won	
Jutra Award	Best Makeup	Kathy Kelso, Colleen Quinton	Won	
Jutra Award	Most Successful Film Outside Quebec	Xavier Dolan	Nominated	
Lumière Awards	Best French-Language Film	Xavier Dolan	Nominated	
RiverRun International Film Festival	Jury Prize - Best Actress	Suzanne Clément	Won	
Tallinn Black Nights Film Festival	Best North American Independent Film	Xavier Dolan	Nominated	
Toronto International Film Festival	Best Canadian Feature Film	Xavier Dolan	Won	
Vancouver Film Critics Circle	Best Actor in a Canadian Film	Melvil Poupaud	Nominated	
Vancouver Film Critics Circle	Best Actress in a Canadian Film	Suzanne Clément	Nominated	
Prix collégial du cinéma québécois	Film of the Year (2013)	Laurence Anyways	Won	
Prix collégial du cinéma québécois	Film of the Decade (2021)	Laurence Anyways	Won	
