= Xavier Dolan =

Canadian filmmaker (born 1989)

Xavier Dolan CM CQ
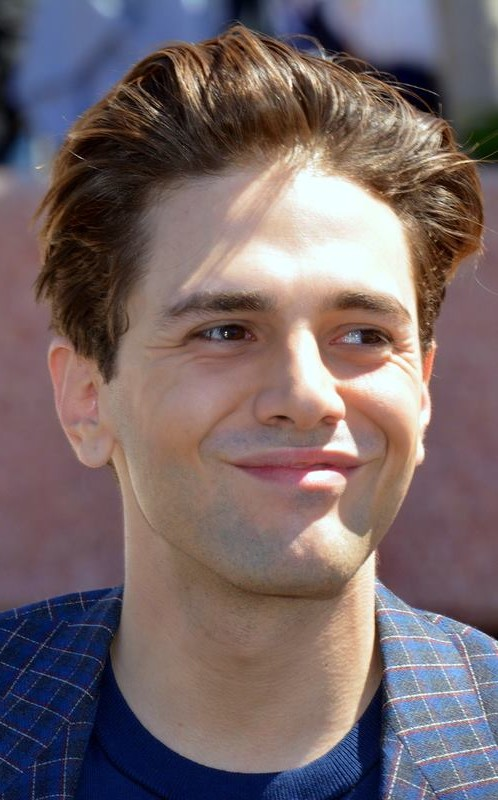
- Dolan at the 2016 Cannes Film Festival
- Born: Xavier Dolan-Tadros; 20 March 1989 (age 37); Montreal, Quebec, Canada
- Occupations: Film director; producer; screenwriter; editor; actor; costume designer
- Years active: 1994–present
- Parent: Manuel Tadros (father)
- Awards: Full list

Xavier Dolan-Tadros CM CQ (French: [ɡzavje dɔlan tadʁɔs]; born 20 March 1989) is a Canadian filmmaker and actor. He began his career as a child actor in commercials before directing several arthouse feature films. He first received international acclaim in 2009 for his feature film directorial debut, I Killed My Mother (J'ai tué ma mère), which he also starred in, wrote, and produced, and which premiered at the 62nd Cannes Film Festival in the Directors' Fortnight section and won three awards from the program.

Since 2009, he has written and directed eight feature films, all of which have premiered at Cannes, with the exception of Tom at the Farm—which premiered at the 70th Venice International Film Festival in 2013—and his first English-language film, The Death & Life of John F. Donovan, which premiered at the 2018 Toronto International Film Festival. Dolan has also directed music videos, notably with Adele for her singles "Hello" (2015), and "Easy on Me" (2021), for which he received a Grammy Award for Best Music Video nomination.

Dolan has won many accolades for his work, including the Jury Prize at the 2014 Cannes Film Festival for Mommy and the Grand Prix at the 2016 Cannes Film Festival for It's Only the End of the World. He has also won several Canadian Screen Awards and César Awards.

Outside of his own films, he has also starred in films from other directors, such as Elephant Song (2014), Boy Erased (2018), Bad Times at the El Royale (2018), It Chapter Two (2019), and Lost Illusions (2021). He has received two nominations for the César Award for Best Supporting Actor; for Lost Illusions in 2022 and The Great Arch (2025) in 2026.

== Early life ==
Dolan was born and raised in Montreal, Quebec. He is the son of Geneviève Dolan, a Québécois public college administrator with Irish roots, and Manuel Tadros, an Egyptian-Canadian actor and singer of Coptic and Lebanese descent. His parents divorced when he was 2 years old, leaving his mother to take care of him in suburban Montreal. He has an older half-brother from his father's previous relationship.

He began acting at the age of 4, after his aunt, a production manager, suggested he auditioned for a minor role in a TV drama. Most notably he starred in a series of 21 commercials for a Canadian drugstore chain, Jean Coutu. He kept working until he was 8, when his mother, unable to cope with such a hyperactive child, sent him to boarding school in rural Quebec for 5 years.

His extensive dubbing career also started to intensify at this time, as Dolan found it hard to audition and get acting jobs. At first it was because he was away for school and then, when he was back in Montreal, because he was "too small, too big, too young, too old for all kinds of roles", according to casting directors. Once he completed his high school education, he decided to enroll at the College de Maisonneuve studying literature, but he will only last two months, later describing the experience as "suffocating".

Remembering his early days as an actor preceding his filmmaking debut, Dolan said:

The director of a film I made when I was seven noticed I asked a lot of questions about everything. And he pointed at the director's chair and said: 'in 20 years, you're going to be sitting there.' But that wasn't clear to me at all. I wanted to be an actor. I became a director because I wanted to have the artistic authority to cast whoever I wanted in the lead role. I wrote my first film because I wanted to act again. I missed acting, I missed expressing things physically and emotionally.

== Career ==
=== I Killed My Mother ===
Dolan attracted international attention with his directorial debut—a film about the complicated relationship between a mother and her teenage son—which he wrote, directed, produced and starred in at the age of 19.

He reportedly began writing the script when he was 16 years old. Talking about the genesis of the film, actress Anne Dorval, who starred as the titular mother and would later work on numerous projects with him, stated Dolan was only 15 when he first came to see her at her dubbing studio. The first script he gave her, Pink Wings (Les Ailes Roses) was ultimately never filmed and it was described as "four films in one" by Dorval. As she turned him down, Dolan informed her he wasn't interested in that script anymore, and that he had decided to turn a short story he had written for French class, The Matricide (Le Matricide), into what would come to be known as I Killed My Mother (J'ai tué ma mère).

He said in an interview with Canadian newspaper Le Soleil that the film was partly autobiographical. When, years later, he was asked how his mother had received the film, he replied:

I think it was easier for my mom to think it was just about somebody else. She said the only thing that woman and her had in common was that they were both stuck in traffic on a bridge every morning. Years later, we talked about it and she said, "When I saw the film, the first thing I said to myself was, I didn't know he hated me that much." But making that film, for me, was such an effort of modesty in terms of accepting what a brash, hysterical, egotistical kid I could have been and embracing the fact that I needed to be honest so the movie wouldn't be one-dimensional. Making that movie was all about making that woman a hero and the moments mocking her are so largely outnumbered by the moments glorifying her, while demonizing him–me. So for me, it was all about saying, "Didn't you know I loved you that much?".

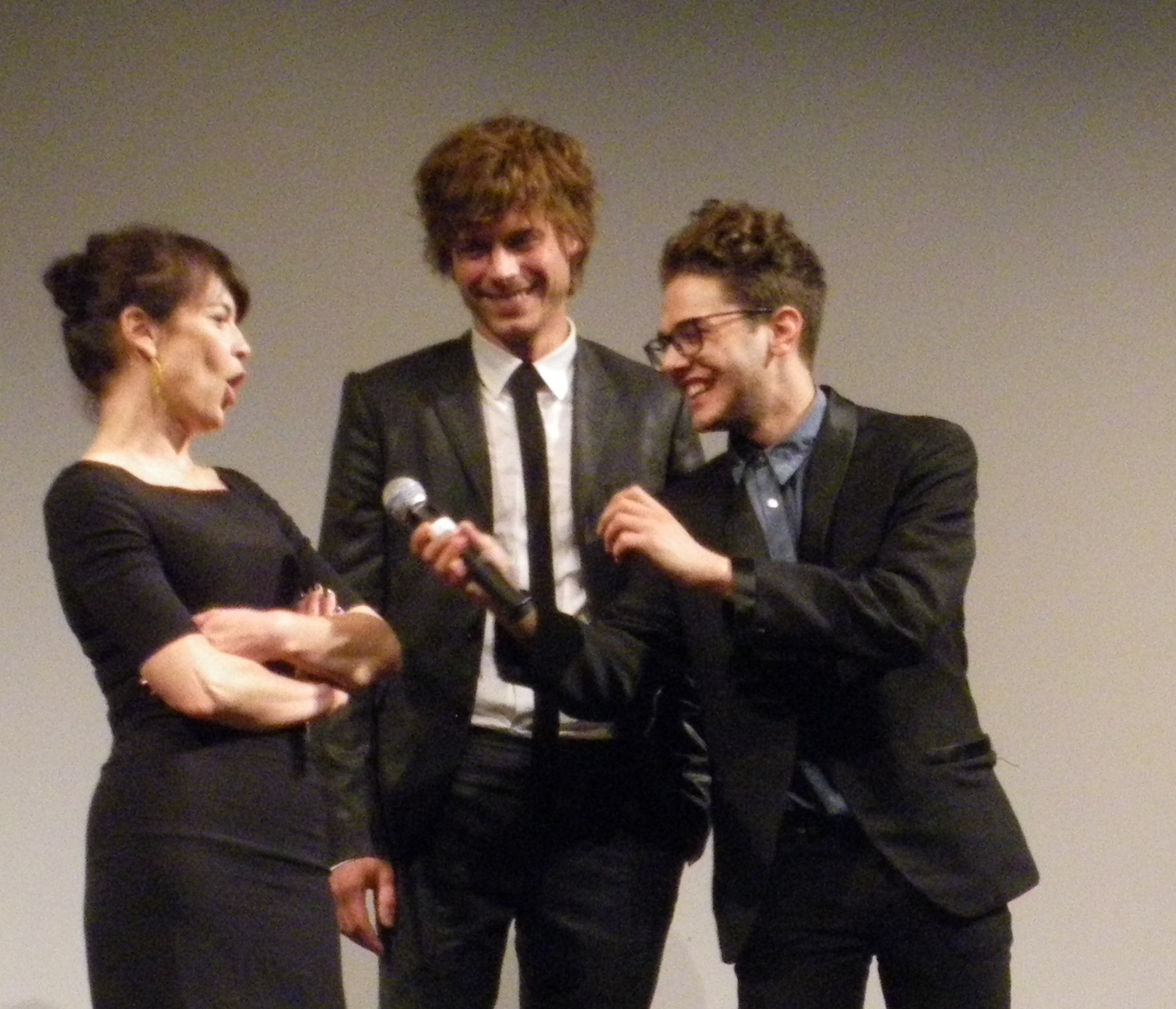
Dolan at the 2009 Toronto International Film Festival

The film premiered at the Director's Fortnight program of the 2009 Cannes Film Festival where it received an eight-minute standing ovation and won three awards: the Art Cinema Award, the SACD Prize for screenplay, and the Prix Regards Jeunes. It also won the Lumière Award for Best French-Language Film and four Jutra Awards, including Best Film, Best Screenplay, and Most Successful Film Outside Québec, beating out Denis Villeneuve's film Polytechnique (2009) in what was deemed an "upset".

Dolan later said that the film was "flawed" and Peter Brunette of The Hollywood Reporter called it "a somewhat uneven film that demonstrates a great deal of talent". Brunette also called the film "funny and audacious", while Allan Hunter of Screen International said that it possessed "the sting of shrewdly observed truth".

The film received the Claude Jutra Award (now known as the Canadian Screen Award for Best First Feature) at the Genies, and the Toronto Film Critics Association awarded Dolan the inaugural $5,000 Jay Scott Prize for emerging talent. I Killed My Mother was named one of Canada's Top Ten features of the year by the Toronto International Film Festival (TIFF) and chosen as Canada's official entry for Best Foreign Language Film for the 2010 Academy Awards, though it failed to receive a nomination from the academy. Distribution rights were later sold to more than 20 countries. Due to legal problems experienced by the film's U.S. distributor, Regent Entertainment, it was not released theatrically in the U.S. until 2013, and once released, it earned little at the box office.

=== Heartbeats ===
The second feature film Dolan directed, Heartbeats (Les Amours imaginaires), was financed privately. The film follows two friends who are infatuated with the same mysterious young man and their friendship suffers. It premiered in the Un Certain Regard category at the 63e Festival de Cannes in May 2010 where it received a standing ovation. It won the top prize of the Official Competition at the Sydney Film Festival in June and screened at several film festivals throughout 2011, but failed to find audiences in non-French-speaking countries. It received several Genie nominations and the AQCC (Québec association of film critics) award for Best Film.

=== Laurence Anyways ===
His third film, Laurence Anyways, was selected to compete in the Un Certain Regard section at the 2012 Cannes Film Festival. Suzanne Clément's performance in the film won the section's award for Best Actress. The film received praise or qualified praise from critics. A critic for MTV's The Out Take, which focuses on LGBT films, called the film "the best film of the year." Despite the praise, the film was not released commercially for a year. Upon release, the film struggled at the box office, and only grossed roughly $500,000 in Canada.

=== Tom at the Farm ===
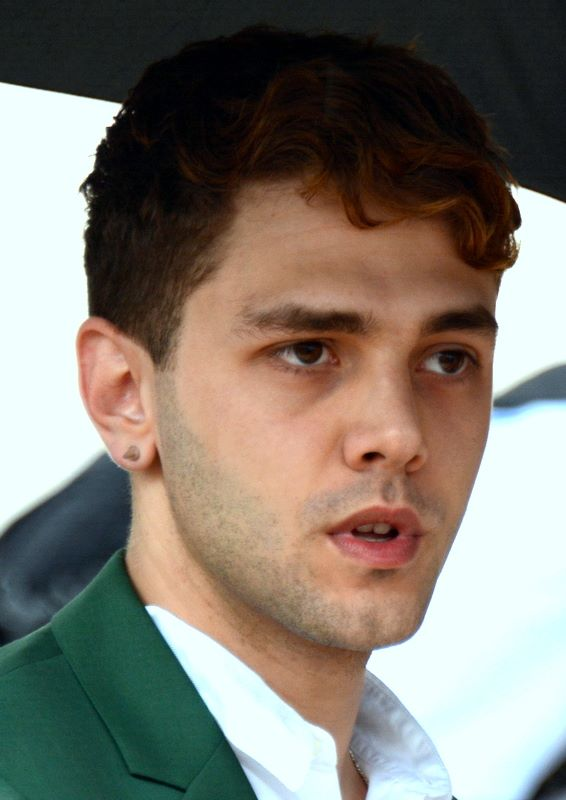
Dolan at the 2014 Cannes Film Festival

In May 2012, Dolan announced that his fourth film would be an adaptation of Michel Marc Bouchard's play Tom at the Farm (Tom à la ferme). It received its world premiere in the main competition section at the 70th Venice International Film Festival on 2 September 2013, and won the FIPRESCI award. Though Tom at the Farm played the festival circuits in 2013, it was not released in the U.S. until 2015. In an August 2015 interview, Dolan said: "No one knows me in the States, because the movies have been released in such an awkward, irregular fashion, all by different distributors... I don't want to sound pretentious, but it's puzzling."

=== Mommy ===
Dolan's 2014 film, Mommy, shared the Jury Prize in the main competition section at the 2014 Cannes Film Festival with Jean-Luc Godard's film Goodbye to Language (Adieu au langage). The jury president for the 2014 festival was Jane Campion and, upon receiving the award, Dolan stated:

The Piano [Campion's film] was the first film that I watched that truly defined who I am... It made me want to write films for beautiful women with soul and will and strength. To even stand on the same stage as you [Campion] is extraordinary.

The film was singled out by critics as Dolan's "most mature" film to date and proved to be a breakthrough in his career as a director. It was his first film to achieve significant success at the box office, grossing over $3.5 million domestically in 2014, becoming the highest-selling film in Quebec for 2014. According to the Montreal Gazette, over one million people watched it in France. Mommy won the César Award for Best Foreign Film in 2015.

=== It's Only the End of the World ===
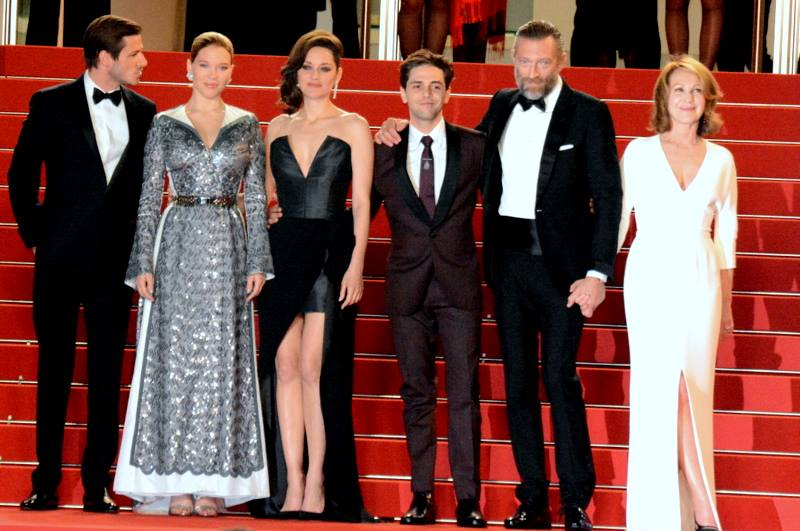
Dolan with the cast of It's Only the End of the World at the 2016 Cannes Film Festival

Dolan's next film was an adaptation of the play Juste la fin du monde by Jean-Luc Lagarce, titled It's Only the End of the World. The film stars Marion Cotillard, Gaspard Ulliel, Vincent Cassel, Léa Seydoux and Nathalie Baye. Filming started in late May 2015. The film was an official selection for the 2016 Cannes Film Festival, in competition for the Palme d'Or, and it won the festival's Grand Prix and the Ecumenical Jury Prize.

Dolan stated that It's Only the End of the World is his best film and the one he's the most proud of. The film premiered to polarized reactions from festival audiences and critics, with Vanity Fair calling it "the most disappointing film at Cannes." The Hollywood Reporter called it "a cold and deeply unsatisfying" film and Variety dubbed it "a frequently excruciating dramatic experience". During the festival, Dolan spoke out against the negative criticism in the media. The film also received positive reviews from critics, including The Guardian, which called it a "brilliant, stylised and hallucinatory evocation of family dysfunction".

It's Only the End of the World was a box office hit in France, where it debuted at number one and sold over 1 million tickets. For his work on the film, Dolan won the César Awards for Best Director and Best Editing at the 42nd ceremony on 24 February 2017. He also won 3 Canadian Screen Awards for Best Motion Picture, Best Achievement in Direction and Best Adapted Screenplay.

=== The Death & Life of John F. Donovan ===
In March 2013, Dolan was in pre-production for his first English-language film The Death & Life of John F. Donovan; he co-wrote the screenplay with Jacob Tierney. The film follows John F. Donovan (Kit Harington), a Hollywood film actor whose life and career are turned upside-down when a gossip columnist (Jessica Chastain) exposes his private correspondence with an 11-year-old fan. The film also stars Susan Sarandon as Donovan's mother and Kathy Bates as his manager. In February 2018, Dolan confirmed via Instagram that Chastain had been cut from the film, and that the story had been altered throughout post-production. Speaking to Telerama, he mentioned the many issues faced during and after filming:

For the first time, everything was painful and problematic from start to finish, from funding to post-production, and beyond. It would be inelegant to name precisely the people who were problematic, and I am finally proud of the end result, but we had to make very difficult choices. I lived all the disappointments that I could live, humanly and artistically. By switching to a large budget, a fragmented shooting, in English and on two continents, I had to face my own ignorance, inexperience, incompetence. Everything was new to me, I had the impression of coming out of my kitchen, that is to say, of my artisanal practice of cinema.

The film had its world premiere at the 2018 Toronto International Film Festival, making it Dolan's first film to premiere at the festival. Following its premiere at the festival, it received universally negative reviews from critics. IndieWire dubbed the film the "worst" of Dolan's career. The Guardian gave the film one out of five stars, deeming it a "dubious mess". Now magazine called the film "mediocre at best". In a more positive review, Screen International wrote that the film "may revisit a lot of familiar territory for Dolan but on this form it is good to welcome him home."

=== Matthias and Maxime ===
Dolan's eighth feature film, titled Matthias & Maxime, centers on the titular Matthias (played by Gabriel D'Almeida Freitas) and Maxime (played by Dolan himself), lifelong friends whose relationship is tested when they act in a short film whose script calls for them to kiss, leaving them both questioning their sexual identities when the experience awakens their long-dormant feelings for each other.

The film had its world premiere in the main competition section at the 2019 Cannes Film Festival on 22 May. It received mixed to generally positive reviews, with The Hollywood Reporter calling it a movie "miming an emotion that's never actually felt" while Variety noted that "it feels at once younger and older, sweeter and more seasoned, than Dolan's last few films". The film was nominated for seven awards at the 22nd Quebec Cinema Awards, including Best Supporting Actor for Funk and Best Editing for Dolan. It won for Best Supporting Actress for Bernard, Best Music for Jean-Michel Blais, and Most Successful Film Outside Quebec. It was also included in the Toronto International Film Festival's list of Canada's top 10 films of 2019.

=== Retirement plans ===
In November 2022, Dolan indicated to Le Journal de Montréal his desire to take a break from the film industry.

In July 2023, in two separate interviews with the Spanish newspapers El Paísand El Mundo, when asked about this break, Dolan explained that he intended to retire from cinema. He said: "I no longer have the desire or strength to commit myself to a project for two years that barely anyone sees. I put too much passion into it to have so many disappointments. It makes me wonder if my filmmaking is bad, and I know it's not." He also discussed his fears of a "civil war caused by intolerance" and went on to say, "I don't understand what is the point of telling stories when everything around us is falling apart. Art is useless and dedicating oneself to cinema, a waste of time." He concluded, "I want to take time to be with my friends and family. I want to shoot commercials and build myself a house in the country one day when I have enough money saved. I don't say that in a sad way at all. I just want to live something else, other experiences."

In a subsequent Instagram post on his personal page, following speculations and criticism, he clarified some of these statements offering a partial transcript of the conversation, writing:

When the journalist asked me why I wanted to stop making films, I said, over the course of a 34-minute long zoom: "I don't need to make any more films. I'm tired. I've made a lot of them, and it's enough. I don't want to go through the process of post-production again, press, traveling, answering questions, wondering if people are gonna watch my work, if it's gonna be sold in x or x territory, I don't want to deal with the anxiety of performing, being successful, being loved. I don't want to depend on other people's reaction. I want to be free. When I look at the world, it's making the work feel, suddenly, well... unimportant. And very, very small. Very, um.... I guess, a little bit, meaningless? It's a privileged thing to be making films in this industry and not realize that the world is burning while we're still making films about the world burning?! (...) I've done it. And I was privileged to. I've worked really hard, also. I gave it everything. And I'm happy with it. I had a very satisfying career. I've also expressed myself very freely. I've been lucky. I've never been told what to do or how to do it. I always kept my freedom." From all these words, El Mundo kept, "art is meaningless and cinema is a waste of time". The first part of that sentence is a vast generalization, and the second, a pure invention. (...) And I felt the need to make it clear that, I, for one, do not consider "art" to be meaningless, nor "cinema" to be a waste of time. (...) I just don't wish to be making films again, as they do not make me happy anymore.

=== Other work ===
Dolan co-owns the production company Sons of Manual along with producer Nancy Grant.

In 2015, Dolan was selected to serve on the jury for the main competition section of the 2015 Cannes Film Festival. Also that year, he directed the music video for "Hello", the lead single from the album 25 by Adele. The video broke the Vevo record for most views in 24 hours, over 27.7 million views. It was also notable for featuring footage shot in IMAX. Dolan received the Juno Award for Video of the Year for directing the video.

Dolan played supporting roles in two 2018 American films: Boy Erased, opposite Lucas Hedges and Troye Sivan, which premiered at the 2018 Toronto International Film Festival; and Bad Times at the El Royale, as British-accented music producer Buddy Sunday. He appeared in the horror follow-up It Chapter Two in 2019, after publicly praising its first installation. When asked how he got the part, he said he had met director Andy Muschietti and told him he'd play any role to be in the sequel, "the door knob, the curtain".

He has also starred in Lost Illusions, an adaption of Illusions perdues by Honoré de Balzac, directed by Xavier Giannoli. For this role, he obtained a nomination for Best Supporting Actor at the 2022 César Awards.

In December 2021, Dolan confirmed via Instagram the end of the shooting of his first TV Drama, The Night Logan Woke Up, based on Michel Marc Bouchard's play of the same name.

In 2025, Dolan starred in the French drama The Great Arch, directed by Stéphane Demoustier, for which he was nominated for the César Award for Best Supporting Actor.

== Influences and style ==
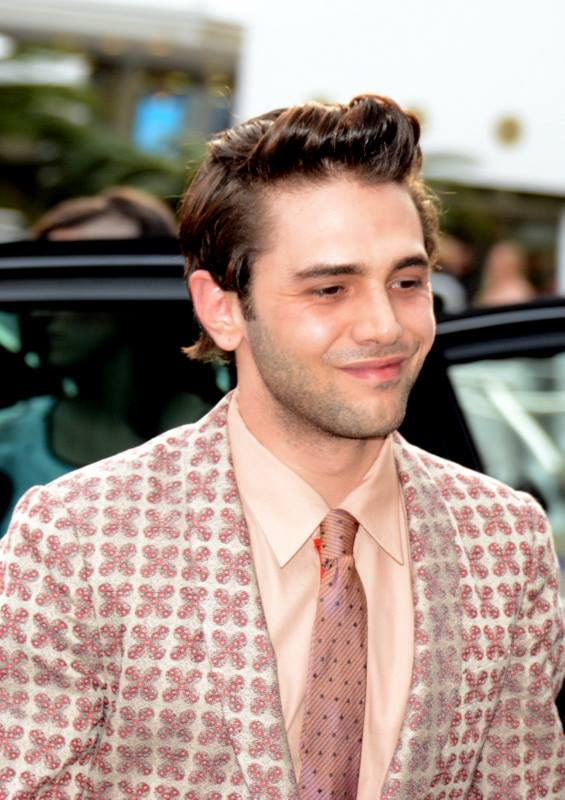
Dolan at the 2015 Cannes Film Festival

Dolan has said that he is not particularly influenced by any specific directors, though in 2009, he identified Michael Haneke as one of his favourite directors for his precise camerawork and strong writing, citing Haneke's Funny Games and The Piano Teacher as favourites.

At the 2014 Cannes Film Festival, he said that Jane Campion's The Piano was a major inspiration for him. He has also cited seeing the film Titanic as an early influence on his decision to enter the film industry. He has mentioned paying tribute to My Own Private Idaho with a sequence in I Killed My Mother, and that he was influenced by the frog rain scene at the end of Magnolia, but said in 2013,

What I'm trying to say is that I'm not that influenced by directors... I've read basically every review of my films because I'm crazy and I focus on what's negative and I want to know what people think—and why they think it. So many times I've been bullied into references and influences that were never mine by viewers that would project their opinions and associations and assumptions on me... But let's get real—ideas travel and everything's been done. It's all a matter of interpreting things again now.

His list of favorite films was published in September 2023 on LaCinetek. It includes several works from the 2000s, such as Million Dollar Baby and Mystic River by Clint Eastwood, There Will Be Blood by Paul Thomas Anderson, Catch Me If You Can by Steven Spielberg and The Departed by Martin Scorsese.

== Personal life ==
Dolan is gay and described his first film I Killed My Mother as semi-autobiographical. In a 2018 interview with The New York Times, Dolan said that due to an adolescence "consumed by work", he made his first friends in his late 20s, and added that he has not been in a long-term relationship with another man because he "tends to be attracted to unattainable heterosexual men", citing then Canadian Prime Minister Justin Trudeau as an example.

In May 2025, in the context of the Gaza war, Dolan signed an open letter, along other film acting figures, condemning the "silence" over the impact of Israeli military actions in Gaza and, in September, he joined other Québécois celebrities in demanding a boycott of the Israeli film industry.

== Filmography ==
=== Film ===
==== As filmmaker ====
Year	Title	Director	Screenwriter	Producer	Film Editor	Costume Designer	Notes
2009	I Killed My Mother (J'ai tué ma mère)	Yes	Yes	Yes	No	Yes	
2010	Heartbeats (Les Amours imaginaires)	Yes	Yes	Yes	Yes	No	Also art director, visual concept, still photographer, costume concepts and press kit
2012	Laurence Anyways	Yes	Yes	Executive	Yes	Yes	Also dubbing director
2013	Tom at the Farm (Tom à la ferme)	Yes	Yes	Yes	Yes	Yes	Also executive producer, dubbing director and English subtitles
2014	Mommy	Yes	Yes	Yes	Yes	Yes	Also English subtitles and French subtitles
2016	It's Only the End of the World (Juste la fin du monde)	Yes	Yes	Yes	Yes	No	Also costume concepts and English subtitles
2018	The Death & Life of John F. Donovan	Yes	Yes	Yes	Yes	No	Also dubbing director and voice actor counterpart for Kit Harington's character in the Canadian French dubbed version
2019	Matthias & Maxime	Yes	Yes	Yes	Yes	Yes	
2021	Charlotte	No	No	Executive	No	No	
2022	The Night Logan Woke Up (La nuit où Laurier Gaudreault s'est réveillé)	Yes	Yes	Yes	Yes	Yes	Limited series, 5x60' episodes
2023	The Beast	No	No	Yes	No	No	Co-producer

==== Acting roles ====
Title	Year	Role	Director(s)	Notes
Heads or Tails (J'en suis !)	1997	Edouard	Claude Fournier	
Le marchand de sable	1999	—	Nadine Fournelle	Short film
The Hidden Fortress (La Forteresse suspendue)	2001	Michaël	Roger Cantin	
Mirrors (Miroirs d'été)	2006	Julien	Étienne Desrosiers	Short film
Martyrs	2008	Antoine Belfond	Pascal Laugier	
Suzie	2009	Punk	Micheline Lanctôt	
I Killed My Mother (J'ai tué ma mère)	2009	Hubert Minel	Himself	Also producer and writer
Heartbeats (Les Amours imaginaires)	2010	Francis	Himself	Also producer, writer and editor
Good Neighbours	2010	Jean-Marc	Jacob Tierney	
Lipsett Diaries	2010	Narrator	Theodore Ushev	Short documentary film
Laurence Anyways	2012	Man at the party	Himself	Also executive producer, writer and editor
Tom at the Farm (Tom à la ferme)	2013	Tom	Himself	Also producer and writer
Miraculum	2014	Étienne	Daniel Grou	
Elephant Song	2014	Michael Aleen	Charles Binamé	
Boy Erased	2018	Jon	Joel Edgerton	Also does own dub-over voice in the European and Canadian French dubbed versions
Bad Times at the El Royale	2018	Buddy Sunday	Drew Goddard	Also does own dub-over voice in the European and Canadian French dubbed versions
Matthias & Maxime	2019	Max	Himself	
It Chapter Two	2019	Adrian Mellon	Andy Muschietti	Also does own dub-over voice in the European and Canadian French dubbed versions
Lost Illusions	2021	Raoul Nathan	Xavier Giannoli	
The Beast	2023	Artificial intelligence system (voice)	Bertrand Bonello	Also co-producer
The Great Arch (L'Inconnu du Grande Arche)	2025	Jean-Louis Subilon	Stéphane Demoustier	

Key
†	Denotes films that have not yet been released

=== As voice actor ===
Dolan is also a voice actor and has dubbed several films in Quebec French. Note: Many films that are dubbed in French are also dubbed in the French spoken in Québec or in one of the versions of French known as international French. DVDs may be labelled VQ for "version Québécoise", which uses a Québécois accent and terms unique to that variety of the French language, or VFQ for "version francophone québécoise", which presents a generally neutral accent but pronounces English words in a way found in North America rather than in France.

- Josh Hutcherson
  - 2009: Cirque du Freak: The Vampire's Assistant – Steve "Leopard" Leonard
  - 2010: The Kids Are All Right – Laser Allgood
  - 2012: Journey 2: The Mysterious Island – Sean Anderson
  - 2012: The Hunger Games – Peeta Mellark
  - 2012: Red Dawn – Robert Kitner
  - 2013: Epic – Nod
  - 2013: The Hunger Games: Catching Fire – Peeta Mellark
  - 2014: The Hunger Games: Mockingjay – Part 1 – Peeta Mellark
  - 2015: The Hunger Games: Mockingjay – Part 2 – Peeta Mellark
  - 2017: The Disaster Artist – Philip Haldiman
  - 2018: Elliot the Littlest Reindeer – Elliot
  - 2023: Five Nights at Freddy's - Mike Schmidt
  - 2025: Five Nights at Freddy's 2 - Mike Schmidt
- Taylor Lautner
  - 2005: The Adventures of Sharkboy and Lavagirl in 3-D – Sharkboy
  - 2008: Twilight – Jacob Black
  - 2009: The Twilight Saga: New Moon – Jacob Black
  - 2010: Valentine's Day – Willy
  - 2010: The Twilight Saga: Eclipse – Jacob Black
  - 2011: Abduction – Nathan Harper
  - 2011: The Twilight Saga: Breaking Dawn – Part 1 – Jacob Black
  - 2012: The Twilight Saga: Breaking Dawn – Part 2 – Jacob Black
  - 2013: Grown Ups 2 – Andy
  - 2015: Tracers – Cam
- Rupert Grint
  - 2001: Harry Potter and the Sorcerer's Stone – Ron Weasley
  - 2002: Harry Potter and the Chamber of Secrets – Ron Weasley
  - 2004: Harry Potter and the Prisoner of Azkaban – Ron Weasley
  - 2005: Harry Potter and the Goblet of Fire – Ron Weasley
  - 2007: Harry Potter and the Order of the Phoenix – Ron Weasley
  - 2009: Harry Potter and the Half-Blood Prince – Ron Weasley
  - 2010: Harry Potter and the Deathly Hallows – Part 1 – Ron Weasley
  - 2011: Harry Potter and the Deathly Hallows – Part 2 – Ron Weasley
  - 2023: Knock at the Cabin – Redmond
- Aaron Taylor-Johnson
  - 2010: Kick-Ass – Dave Lizewski / Kick-Ass
  - 2012: Savages – Ben Leonard
  - 2012: Anna Karenina – Count Alexei Kirillovich Vronsky
  - 2013: Kick-Ass 2 – Dave Lizewski / Kick-Ass
  - 2014: Godzilla – U.S. Navy EOD LT Ford Brody
  - 2020: Tenet – Ives
  - 2022: Bullet Train – Tangerine
- Dylan O'Brien
  - 2014: The Maze Runner – Thomas
  - 2015: Maze Runner: The Scorch Trials – Thomas
  - 2016: Deepwater Horizon – Caleb Holloway
  - 2017: American Assassin – Mitch Rapp
  - 2018: Maze Runner: The Death Cure – Thomas
  - 2020: Flashback – Fredrick Fitzell
  - 2022: The Outfit – Richie Boyle
- Nicholas Hoult
  - 2005: The Weather Man – Mike
  - 2013: Jack the Giant Slayer – Jack
  - 2015: Mad Max: Fury Road – Nux
  - 2015: Equals – Silas
  - 2016: Collide – Casey Stein
  - 2019: Dark Phoenix – Hank McCoy / Beast
- Eddie Redmayne
  - 2011: My Week with Marilyn – Colin Clark
  - 2014: The Theory of Everything – Stephen Hawking
  - 2015: The Danish Girl – Einar Wegener / Lili Elbe (Lili Elvenes)
  - 2016: Fantastic Beasts and Where to Find Them – Newt Scamander
  - 2018: Fantastic Beasts: The Crimes of Grindelwald – Newt Scamander
  - 2022: Fantastic Beasts: The Secrets of Dumbledore – Newt Scamander
- Daryl Sabara
  - 2001: Spy Kids – Juni Cortez
  - 2002: Spy Kids 2: The Island of Lost Dreams – Juni Cortez
  - 2003: Spy Kids 3-D: Game Over – Juni Cortez
  - 2007: Halloween – Wesley Rhoades
  - 2011: Spy Kids: All the Time in the World – Juni Cortez
  - 2012: John Carter – Ned
- Nat Wolff
  - 2013: Admission – Jeremiah Balakian
  - 2014: The Fault in Our Stars – Isaac
  - 2015: Paper Towns – Quentin "Q" Jacobsen
  - 2015: The Intern – Justin
  - 2017: Home Again – Teddy Dorsey
- Haley Joel Osment
  - 2000: Pay It Forward – Trevor
  - 2002: The Hunchback of Notre Dame II – Zephyr
  - 2002: The Country Bears – Beary Barrington
  - 2003: The Jungle Book 2 – Mowgli
  - 2003: Secondhand Lions – Walter

Live-action

- 2000: My Dog Skip – Spit
- 2005: Saw II – Daniel Matthews
- 2006: Alpha Dog – Keith Stratten
- 2007: Whistler – Quinn McKaye
- 2008: High School Musical 3: Senior Year – Donnie Dion
- 2012: Life of Pi – Pi Patel
- 2012: Chernobyl Diaries – Chris
- 2014: Maleficent – Prince Philip
- 2014: The Amazing Spider-Man 2 – Harry Osborn
- 2016: Everybody Wants Some!! – Jake
- 2019: Spider-Man: Far From Home – Brad Davis
- 2019: The Death & Life of John F. Donovan – John F. Donovan
- 2021: Dune – Paul Atreides
- 2023: Transformers: Rise of the Beasts – Noah Díaz
- 2024: Dune: Part Two – Paul Atreides
- 2026: Masters of the Universe - Adam Glenn / He-Man

Animation

- 2003: Finding Nemo – Tad
- 2006: Grossology – Ty
- 2007: Magi-Nation – Tony
- 2009: South Park – Stan Marsh
- 2009: Planet 51 – Skiff
- 2010: How to Train Your Dragon – Hiccup
- 2011: The Smurfs – Brainy Smurf
- 2015: Inside Out – Fear
- 2017: The Emoji Movie – Gene
- 2018: Anatane: Saving the Children of Okura – Anatane
- 2022: Lightyear - Buzz Lightyear
- 2023: Spider-Man: Across the Spider-Verse – The Spot/Dr. Jonathan Ohnn
- 2024: Inside Out 2 - Fear

=== As a music video director ===
Year	Title	Artist	Director	Producer	Editor
2013	"College Boy"	Indochine	Yes	No	No
2015	"Hello"	Adele	Yes	Yes	Yes
2021	"Easy on Me"	Adele	Yes	Yes	Yes

=== Frequent collaborators ===
Actors	I Killed My Mother	Heartbeats	Laurence Anyways	Tom at the Farm	Mommy	It's Only the End of the World	The Death & Life of John F. Donovan	Matthias & Maxime	The Night Logan Woke Up
Anne Dorval	X mark	X mark	X mark		X mark			X mark	X mark
Suzanne Clément	X mark		X mark		X mark				
Antoine Olivier Pilon			X mark		X mark				
Manuel Tadros	X mark		X mark	X mark					
Patricia Tulasne	X mark	X mark	X mark						
Jacques Lavallée			X mark	X mark				X mark	X mark
Emily Hampshire			X mark				X mark		
Pierre-Yves Cardinal				X mark	X mark				
Nathalie Baye			X mark			X mark			
Monia Chokri		X mark	X mark						
Magalie Lépine-Blondeau		X mark	X mark						X mark
Éric Bruneau		X mark	X mark						X mark
Niels Schneider	X mark	X mark							
Monique Spaziani	X mark		X mark					X mark	
Perrette Souplex		X mark	X mark						
Pierre Chagnon	X mark		X mark						

== Books on Xavier Dolan ==
- Fiaba Di Martino, Laura Delle Vedove, Xavier Dolan. Il sentimento dell'invisibile, Italy, Sovera Edizioni, 2016, 112 p.
- Patrick Delisle-Crevier, Raconte-moi Xavier Dolan, France, Éditions Petit Homme, 2017, 152 p.
- Pierre-Alexandre Fradet, Philosopher à travers le cinéma québécois. Xavier Dolan, Denis Côté, Stéphane Lafleur et autres cinéastes, France, Éditions Hermann, 2018, 274 p.
- Laurent Beurdeley, Xavier Dolan: l'indomptable, Canada, Éditions du CRAM, 2019, 455 p.
- Andrée Lafontaine, ReFocus: The Films of Xavier Dolan (ReFocus: The International Directors Series), Edinburgh University Press, 2021, 256 p.
- Flaminia Fiocco, À l'impossible je suis tenu. Per una disamina trasversale della figura e della cinematografia di Xavier Dolan, Italy, Edizioni Pendragon, 2021, 280 p.

== See also ==
- List of Canadian actors
- List of Canadian directors
- List of Canadian producers
