= Heartbeats (2010 film) =

2010 film

- Theatrical release poster
- French: Les amours imaginaires
- Directed by: Xavier Dolan
- Written by: Xavier Dolan
- Produced by: Xavier Dolan; Carole Mondello; Daniel Morin
- Starring: Monia Chokri; Niels Schneider; Xavier Dolan
- Cinematography: Stéphanie Weber Biron
- Edited by: Xavier Dolan
- Production company: Alliance Vivafilm
- Distributed by: Remstar Distribution
- Release dates: May 16, 2010 (Cannes); June 11, 2010 (Canada)
- Running time: 101 minutes
- Country: Canada
- Language: French
- Budget: CAD$600,000 (approx. USD$594,695)
- Box office: $843,423

Heartbeats (French: Les amours imaginaires, lit. 'Imaginary Lovers') is a 2010 Canadian romantic drama film written, directed and edited by Xavier Dolan. It follows the story of two friends who both fall in love with the same man. It premiered in the Un Certain Regard section of the 2010 Cannes Film Festival.

== Plot ==
Francis and Marie, two best friends in their 20s living in Montreal, first meet Nicolas at a dinner party. After meeting up with Nicolas at a coffee shop, Francis and Marie both feign lack of interest in him. Over the next couple of weeks, the three form a close friendship, meeting up regularly and even sleeping together in the same bed. However, it is clear that both Francis and Marie have an interest in Nicolas beyond friendship.

Francis is unhappy when Nicolas invites Marie to the theater. Marie is visibly disappointed when she arrives at a Vietnamese restaurant with Nicolas after the play, finds Francis dining with several friends, and watches Nicolas take a seat at the end of the table furthest from her. Both interpret Nicolas' actions as signs of intimacy and affection: Nicolas eats a cherry from Francis' hand; Nicolas tells Marie he loves her and also loves Francis. Their feelings lead to competition for Nicolas' affections, evidenced by their rivalry over the gifts they buy for his birthday.

The relationship culminates in a weekend trip to the country house of Nicolas' aunt. Marie becomes jealous when Nicolas feeds Francis a marshmallow, telling him to eat it slowly "like a striptease", and she goes to bed early. The next morning, she wakes up alone and observes the two frolicking together in the distance. She decides to leave, but Francis chases after her and the two end up wrestling on the ground. Nicolas is not impressed and decides to leave, saying they can love him or leave him.

On returning from the trip, neither sees Nicolas. Each leaves him a voicemail message and Marie writes him a love letter. Eventually, Francis meets Nicolas and confesses his feelings, telling him he loves him and wants to kiss him. Nicolas responds, "How could you think I was gay?", leaving Francis devastated. Later, Marie catches up with Nicolas in the street and first tells him the letter she sent was meant for a female friend accidentally switched with an academic essay she intended for him. Nicolas asks Marie if this female friend is her lover or her ex, which Marie confusedly denies. As Nicolas goes to leave, claiming to have left something on the stove, she asks how he would feel if she had intended the poem for him. He says he would still have something on the stove.

One year later, Francis and Marie have rekindled their friendship. At a house party, they scathingly rebuff an attempt by Nicolas to greet them. Later, they both catch the eye of another party guest and together head for him, mirroring the time they first met Nicholas.

== Cast ==
- Monia Chokri as Marie
- Niels Schneider as Nicolas
- Xavier Dolan as Francis
- Anne Dorval as Désirée
- Anne-Élisabeth Bossé as young woman 1
- Olivier Morin as young man 1
- Magalie Lépine-Blondeau as young woman 2
- Éric Bruneau as young man 2
- Gabriel Lessard as young man 3
- Bénédicte Décary as young woman 3
- François Bernier as sex partner 1
- Benoît McGinnis as sex partner 2
- François Xavier Dufour as sex partner 3
- Anthony Huneault as Antonin
- Patricia Tulasne as hairdresser
- Jody Hargreaves as Jody
- Clara Palardy as Clara
- Minou Petrowski as cashier
- Perrette Sounder as hairdresser
- Sophie Desmarais as "rockabilly"
- Marie-Christine Cormier as barmaid
- Louis Garrel as guest at last party

== Reception ==
On review aggregator Rotten Tomatoes, the film holds an approval rating of 73% based on 73 reviews, with an average rating of 6.89/10. The website's critics consensus reads: "An art film to the max, Heartbeats intriguing and appealing premise is sometimes buried by director Xavier Dolan's filmmaking flourishes." On Metacritic, the film has a weighted average score of 70 out of 100, based on 21 critics, indicating "generally favorable reviews". A New York Times critic wrote that compared to Dolan's first film Heartbeats "takes style even more seriously, both in its allusive execution–he draws giddily from things like the Nouvelle Vague and Wong Kar-wai–and its subject: self-fashioning and teasing, unfulfilled desire."

== Accolades ==
Year	Award	Category	Recipient(s)	Result
2010	Sydney Film Festival	Sydney Film Prize	Xavier Dolan	Won
2010	Cannes Film Festival	Regards Jeunes Prize	Xavier Dolan	Won
2010	Cannes Film Festival	Un Certain Regard	Xavier Dolan	Nominated
2011	César Awards	Best Foreign Film	Xavier Dolan	Nominated
2011	Genie Awards	Best Director	Xavier Dolan	Nominated
2011	Genie Awards	Best Motion Picture	Xavier Dolan, Carole Mondello and Daniel Morin	Nominated
2011	Genie Awards	Best Supporting Actress	Anne-Élisabeth Bossé	Nominated
2011	Genie Awards	Best Cinematography	Stéphanie Weber Biron	Nominated
