= Mommy (2014 film) =

2014 film by Xavier Dolan

- Film poster
- Directed by: Xavier Dolan
- Written by: Xavier Dolan
- Produced by: Xavier Dolan; Nancy Grant
- Starring: Anne Dorval; Suzanne Clément; Antoine Olivier Pilon; Patrick Huard; Alexandre Goyette; Michèle Lituac; Viviane Pacal; Natalie Hamel-Roy
- Cinematography: André Turpin
- Edited by: Xavier Dolan
- Music by: Noia
- Production companies: Metafilms; Société de développement des entreprises culturelles; Sons of Manual; Super Écran; Téléfilm Canada
- Distributed by: Les Films Séville
- Release dates: 22 May 2014 (Cannes); 19 September 2014 (Canada)
- Running time: 138 minutes
- Country: Canada
- Language: French
- Budget: $4.9 million
- Box office: $13.1 million

Mommy is a 2014 Canadian melodrama film written, directed and edited by Xavier Dolan and starring Anne Dorval, Antoine Olivier Pilon, and Suzanne Clément. The story concerns a mother with a sometimes-violent teenage son, struggling to control his behaviour in a desperate attempt to avoid seeing him being institutionalized.

The story focuses on mother–son relationships, a reoccurring theme in Dolan's work, and also marks his fourth collaboration with Dorval and his third with Clément. Inspiration for this particular story was drawn from Dolan's discovery of Pilon and the music of Ludovico Einaudi. It was shot in Quebec in an unconventional 1:1 aspect ratio.

The film debuted at the 2014 Cannes Film Festival, where it won the Jury Prize. It subsequently became a critical and financial success, grossing over $13 million worldwide. Mommy went on to win numerous other awards, among them nine Canadian Screen Awards, including Best Motion Picture. Mommy was announced as Canada's submission for the Academy Award for Best International Feature Film at the 87th Academy Awards, but it was not nominated.

== Plot ==
In a fictional outcome for the 2015 Canadian federal election, a political party comes to power and establishes a law called S-14. This legislation allows parents of troubled children with limited finances to place their children in hospitals, without regard for fundamental justice.

Diane "Die" Després, a widowed mother and 46-year-old advice columnist, picks up her son Steve from an institution. Steve, who has ADHD and an attachment disorder, was being discharged after starting a fire in which another youth was injured. Die brings Steve to their new home in Saint-Hubert and struggles to care for him under financial distress. When Steve gives her a cart full of groceries and a necklace reading "Mommy", Die suspects that he has stolen the items. Enraged by the accusation, Steve begins choking her, and she defends herself by hitting him with a glass frame. Whilst chaos ensues, Kyla, a neighbour and teacher on sabbatical, shows up to tend to Steve's wounds.

Kyla, who is dealing with a stuttering problem and recently moved into the area with her husband and daughter, begins to tutor Steve. After a disastrous tutoring session where Steve goads Kyla, she snaps and attacks him. After the confrontation, Steve mellows and indicates he is glad to know her and respects her boundaries and expectations. Kyla notes Steve reminds her of her late son. The three have bonded and their situation improves: Die has a cleaning job and translation work on the side, Kyla's speech problem is resolving, and Steve is receiving better marks on his school work. All is looking up, until Die is served papers by the parents of the injured boy, indicating she and Steve are being sued for the injuries caused by his fire.

Die finds a lawyer, a neighbour and a potential love interest, who is willing to help them with Steve's case. The three of them go out to a karaoke restaurant for the evening. Over the night, Steve is increasingly agitated by the atmosphere and what he sees as his mother's sexual interest in the lawyer. Steve decides to sing, but is taunted by the audience, leading to a fight. They are thrown out. Steve, Die and their lawyer argue, ending with Die slapping the lawyer in retaliation for him slapping Steve, driving the lawyer away. Die in turn shouts at Steve for continually being an issue in her life, whereupon Steve runs away. He returns the following morning.

Die continues to try to help her son and rebuild their lives, but while out shopping with Die and Kyla, Steve disappears. He is found by Kyla after slitting his wrists. Although he survives, Die comes to realise she is running out of options. One day Die and Kyla surprise Steve with a picnic, and on the drive Die finds herself reflecting on all the dreams she had for her son to live a fulfilled, happy life. The trio end up not at a picnic site as the faux ending implies, but at a hospital to commit Steve under S-14. Upon realising the deception by the two women, Steve angrily resists attempts to apprehend him by hospital staff. Die begins to regret the decision when she helplessly watches the officials use violence and tasers to subdue him.

Kyla announces she is moving to Toronto and Die encourages her. Kyla is relieved Die is not upset. While explaining how much she enjoyed her time with Die and Steve, she accidentally makes a faux-pas about 'abandoning her family'. Die responds that she holds on to hope that her life and the life she envisages for her son will come to fruition. Kyla returns home as Die privately breaks down in tears. While preparing dinner and doing translation work, Die misses a phone call from Steve.

Back at the hospital, Steve, restrained in a straitjacket, apologises to his mother in a voicemail. Immediately after the straps of his jacket are removed by two officials, Steve runs full speed towards a large, bright window.

== Cast ==
- Anne Dorval as Diane "Die" Després
- Antoine Olivier Pilon as Steve O'Connor Després
- Suzanne Clément as Kyla
- Alexandre Goyette as Patrick
- Patrick Huard as Paul

== Production ==
=== Development ===
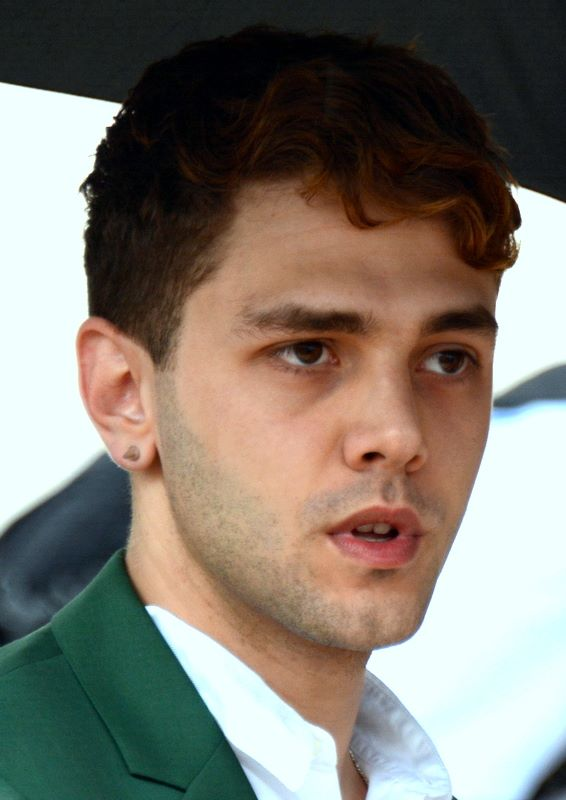
Dolan wrote the screenplay and chose an unconventional aspect ratio for the film.

Director Xavier Dolan wrote the screenplay, though he said at the time he had never known a person with attention deficit hyperactivity disorder or the same behavioural disorders that the character Steve exhibits. However, Dolan said his own mother is an inspiration for his writing.

With Dolan acknowledging mother-son relationships have always been an underlying theme in his work, the specific idea for Mommy came about after directing Antoine Olivier Pilon in the music video for "College Boy" by Indochine, finding him to be a great actor. Inspired by another song, "Experience" by Ludovico Einaudi, he wrote a scene about a mother fantasizing about a future with her son that will never come to be, and wrote a story around it. Dolan stated it was important to show how unpredictable mental illness can be in a home. The concept of the S-14 law was inspired by an article he had read about a mother who used a law to transfer custody of a child to the state, although in an interview with Le Devoir, Dolan could not recall which country this happened in.

=== Filming ===
Mommy was filmed in Longueuil, Quebec. Dolan said that when filming, the actors and crew were often rewriting their lines. In casting actresses Anne Dorval and Suzanne Clément, whom Dolan had worked with before, he assigned them roles that he felt were the opposite of what each had previously played.

The film was shot with a handheld camera, in a 1:1 aspect ratio, although most modern films are shot in 1.85:1 or 2.35:1 aspect ratios. On the unusual aspect ratio, Xavier Dolan said, "I know a lot of people are saying, 'Oh, 1:1, how pretentious.' But for me, it seems a more humble and private format, a little more fitting to these lives we're diving into. Cinemascope [2.35:1] would have been extremely pretentious and incompatible for Mommy. To try to get in that apartment and film these people in that aspect ratio would have been unseemly." He also said cinematographer André Turpin had long wanted to experiment with the format. Dolan denied the ratio was meant to invoke the website Instagram, emphasizing this is the original aspect ratio in film history.

== Release ==
The film premiered on 22 May 2014, at the Cannes Film Festival, concluding with a 13-minute standing ovation. The film opened in Montreal on 8 September, and in Toronto on 3 October. In France, the film was distributed by Diaphana Films, with associate company agnès b. selling Mommy necklaces to promote the film. The film's U.S. distributor Roadside Attractions waited until 2015 for its release.

The film became available on the U.K. Netflix in 2016, with Dolan publicly criticizing the company for altering the unconventional aspect ratio and demanding, "Take it as it is, or remove it." Netflix corrected the ratio hours later.

== Reception ==
=== Box office ===
On its opening weekend in Quebec, the film grossed $471,902. Mommy was Dolan's first film to achieve success at the box office, grossing over $3.5 million domestically in 2014, becoming the highest-selling film in Quebec for 2014. In Canada alone, it reached the $2 million gross on 16 October.

According to the Montreal Gazette, over one million people went to see the film in France. The film ended its run on 19 March 2015 after making $3.5 million in North America and $9.6 million in other territories, for a worldwide total of $13.1 million.

=== Critical response ===
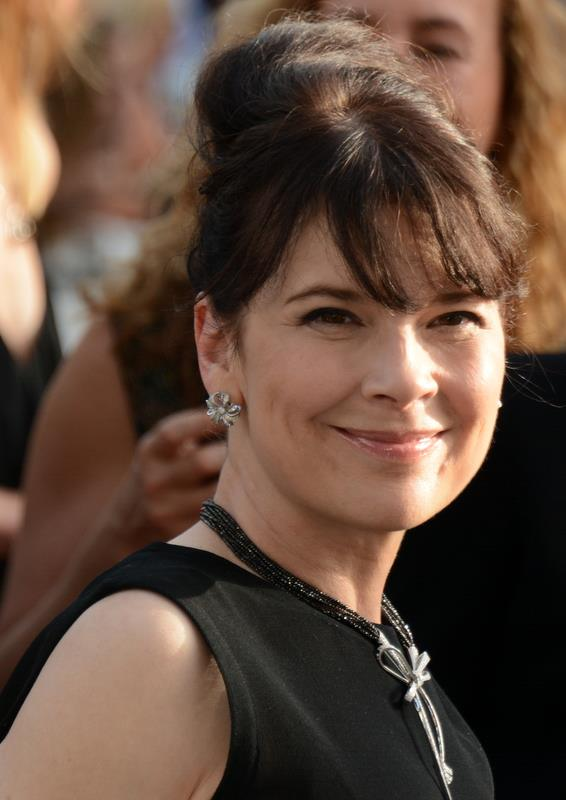
Anne Dorval received positive reviews for her performance and won the Canadian Screen Award for Best Actress.

On Rotten Tomatoes, the film received an approval rating of 89%, with an average score of 7.9/10 based on 130 reviews; the site's consensus states: "As challenging as it is rewarding, Mommy finds writer-director Xavier Dolan taking another impressive step forward". On Metacritic, the film holds an average score of 74, based on 34 critics, indicating "generally favorable reviews" in accordance with the website's standards.

In Canada, David Berry of the National Post gave the film four stars, writing, "As a movie, Mommy is a very similar thing to its namesake jewellery, a flashy, scary, gorgeous little piece of home, a shiny bauble that still manages to hang very close to the heart". Brendan Kelly of the Montreal Gazette gave it five out of five stars, calling it "the absurdly prolific young auteur's best film yet" and "an ode to the strength of tough working-class single mothers everywhere", and praising Anne Dorval as "extraordinary". Brian D. Johnson of Maclean's credited Dorval for an award-worthy "powerhouse performance". Johnson saw Mommy as more mature than Dolan's previous I Killed My Mother, writing "the tables are turned" in writing the film from the mother's perspective. Peter Howell of the Toronto Star gave the film four stars, saying its smartphone-style picture made it timely and concluding it was "one of the best movies of the year, period". Liam Lacey at The Globe and Mail gave the film three stars, calling the introductory information about S-14 "clumsy", but added "What makes the flaws forgivable is Dolan's love of his characters".

On 21 May 2014, Mommy received a four-star rating from The Guardian reviewer Peter Bradshaw, who described the film as "a splashy, transgressive treat, from trailer-trash chat to unexpected sex and surprising emotional depth". Following Dolan's receipt of the Jury Prize at the 2014 Cannes Film Festival, Guardian writer Xan Brooks introduced the film as "a boisterous Oedipal comedy". Peter Debruge of Variety called it "A funny, heartbreaking and, above all, original work". Mark Olsen of the Los Angeles Times wrote the film "feels like nothing less than Dolan's magnum opus, for the time being at least". Sandra Hall of the Sydney Morning Herald wrote that while she initially found there was "too much noise, too many emotional eruptions and too many tone-deaf subtitles", she found Pilon and Dorval's performances to be "remarkable". Peter Travers of Rolling Stone gave the film three and a half stars, calling it rattling. The Wall Street Journal's Joe Morgenstern, while finding the acting "powerful", found fault in the aspect ratio. Richard Brody of The New Yorker panned the film, saying the depiction of Steve "has no basis in psychology; rather, it appears as Dolan's own pseudo-transgressive artistic tantrum".

=== Accolades ===
The film was selected to compete for the Palme d'Or in the main competition section at the 2014 Cannes Film Festival, where it won the Jury Prize. The film also won nine awards at the 3rd Canadian Screen Awards in 2015, including Best Motion Picture and 10 awards at the 17th Jutra Awards, including Best Film. It was also Best Foreign Film at the 40th César Awards.

Mommy was selected as the Canadian entry for Best Foreign Language Film at the 87th Academy Awards, but was not nominated. The film was included in the list of "Canada's Top Ten" feature films of 2014, selected by a panel of filmmakers and industry professionals organized by TIFF.

In July 2025, it was one of the films voted for the "Readers' Choice" edition of The New York Times' list of "The 100 Best Movies of the 21st Century," finishing at number 274.

Award	Date of ceremony	Category	Recipient(s)	Result	Ref(s)
Camerimage	2014	Bronze Frog	André Turpin	Won	
Canadian Screen Awards	1 March 2015	Best Motion Picture	Xavier Dolan and Nancy Grant	Won	
Canadian Screen Awards	1 March 2015	Best Art Direction / Production Design	Colombe Raby	Nominated	
Canadian Screen Awards	1 March 2015	Best Costume Design	Xavier Dolan	Nominated	
Canadian Screen Awards	1 March 2015	Best Cinematography	André Turpin	Won	
Canadian Screen Awards	1 March 2015	Best Director	Xavier Dolan	Won	
Canadian Screen Awards	1 March 2015	Best Editing	Xavier Dolan	Won	
Canadian Screen Awards	1 March 2015	Best Makeup	Maïna Militza	Won	
Canadian Screen Awards	1 March 2015	Best Actor	Antoine Olivier Pilon	Won	
Canadian Screen Awards	1 March 2015	Best Actress	Anne Dorval	Won	
Canadian Screen Awards	1 March 2015	Best Supporting Actress	Suzanne Clément	Won	
Canadian Screen Awards	1 March 2015	Best Overall Sound	Sylvain Brassard, Jo Caron, François Grenon and Luc Landry	Nominated	
Canadian Screen Awards	1 March 2015	Best Sound Editing	Sylvain Brassard, Benoît Dame, Isabelle Favreau and Guy Francoeur	Nominated	
Canadian Screen Awards	1 March 2015	Best Original Screenplay	Xavier Dolan	Won	
Cannes Film Festival	14 – 25 May 2014	Prix du Jury	Xavier Dolan	Won	
César Awards	20 February 2015	Best Foreign Film	Xavier Dolan	Won	
Chicago Film Critics Association	15 December 2014	Best Foreign Language Film		Nominated	
David di Donatello Awards	12 June 2015	Best Foreign Film	Xavier Dolan	Nominated	
Dorian Awards	20 January 2015	Best Foreign Language Film		Won	
Dorian Awards	20 January 2015	Wilde Artist of the Year	Xavier Dolan	Nominated	
Festival International du Film Francophone de Namur	10 October 2014	Best Actor	Antoine Olivier Pilon	Won	
Festival International du Film Francophone de Namur	10 October 2014	Best Actress	Anne Dorval and Suzanne Clément	Won	
Festival International du Film Francophone de Namur	10 October 2014	Best Cinematography	André Turpin	Won	
Independent Spirit Awards	30 November 2014	Best Foreign Film		Nominated	
Jutra Awards	15 March 2015	Best Film	Metafilms – Nancy Grant	Won	
Jutra Awards	15 March 2015	Best Director	Xavier Dolan	Won	
Jutra Awards	15 March 2015	Best Actor	Antoine Olivier Pilon	Won	
Jutra Awards	15 March 2015	Best Actress	Anne Dorval	Won	
Jutra Awards	15 March 2015	Best Supporting Actress	Suzanne Clément	Won	
Jutra Awards	15 March 2015	Best Screenplay	Xavier Dolan	Won	
Jutra Awards	15 March 2015	Best Art Direction	Colombe Raby	Nominated	
Jutra Awards	15 March 2015	Best Costume Design	Xavier Dolan	Nominated	
Jutra Awards	15 March 2015	Best Cinematography	André Turpin	Won	
Jutra Awards	15 March 2015	Best Editing	Xavier Dolan	Won	
Jutra Awards	15 March 2015	Most Successful Film Outside Quebec		Won	
Jutra Awards	15 March 2015	Billet d'or		Won	
Lumière Awards	2 February 2015	Best French-Language Film	Xavier Dolan	Nominated	
Online Film Critics Society Awards	15 December 2014	Best Picture		Nominated	
Online Film Critics Society Awards	15 December 2014	Best Foreign Language Film		Nominated	
Online Film Critics Society Awards	15 December 2014	Best Actress	Anne Dorval	Nominated	
Online Film Critics Society Awards	15 December 2014	Best Supporting Actress	Suzanne Clément	Nominated	
Prix collégial du cinéma québécois	2015	Best Film		Nominated	
Robert Awards	7 February 2016	Robert Award for Best Non-American Film	Xavier Dolan	Won	
Satellite Awards	15 February 2015	Best Actress in a Motion Picture	Anne Dorval	Nominated	
Satellite Awards	15 February 2015	Best International Film		Nominated	
Satellite Awards	15 February 2015	Breakthrough Performance	Antoine Olivier Pilon	Won	
Tallinn Black Nights Film Festival	December 2014	Best North American Independent Film	Xavier Dolan	Won	
Toronto Film Critics Association	15 December 2014	Best Canadian Film	Xavier Dolan	Nominated	
Vancouver Film Critics Circle	5 January 2015	Best Canadian Film		Nominated	
Vancouver Film Critics Circle	5 January 2015	Best Director of a Canadian Film	Xavier Dolan	Nominated	
Vancouver Film Critics Circle	5 January 2015	Best Actor in a Canadian Film	Antoine Olivier Pilon	Won	
Vancouver Film Critics Circle	5 January 2015	Best Actress in a Canadian Film	Anne Dorval	Nominated	
Vancouver Film Critics Circle	5 January 2015	Best Supporting Actress in a Canadian Film	Suzanne Clément	Won	
Vancouver Film Critics Circle	5 January 2015	Best Screenplay for a Canadian Film	Xavier Dolan	Won	
Vilnius International Film Festival	2015	Audience Award		Won	
Washington D.C. Area Film Critics Association Awards	8 December 2014	Best Foreign Language Film		Nominated	

== See also ==
- List of submissions to the 87th Academy Awards for Best Foreign Language Film
- List of Canadian submissions for the Academy Award for Best Foreign Language Film
