= List of Canadian films of 2006 =

This is a list of Canadian films which were released in 2006:

Title	Director	Cast	Genre	Notes
533 Statements	Tori Foster		Documentary	
5ive Girls	Warren P. Sonoda	Ron Perlman, Jennifer Miller	Horror	
After All (Après tout)	Alexis Fortier Gauthier	Catherine De Léan, Rémi-Pierre Paquin	Short film	
Aruba	Hubert Davis	A.J. Saudin, Devon Bostick	Short film	Panavision Grand Jury Award at Palm Springs International ShortFest
Asiemut	Olivier Higgins, Mélanie Carrier	Olivier Higgins, Mélanie Carrier	Travel documentary	
Away From Her	Sarah Polley	Julie Christie, Gordon Pinsent, Olympia Dukakis, Michael Murphy, Kristen Thomson	Drama/romance about Alzheimer’s disease based on story by Alice Munro.	Sarah Polley's feature directorial debut. A Canada-U.K. co-production made with U.S. financing.
The Beautiful Beast (La Belle Bête)	Karim Hussain	Carole Laure, Caroline Dhavernas, Marc-André Grondin, David La Haye	Family drama	Based on the novel La Belle Bête by Marie-Claire Blais
Black Christmas	Glen Morgan	Katie Cassidy, Michelle Trachtenberg	Horror	A remake of the 1974 film made with U.S. financing.
Black Eyed Dog	Pierre Gang	Sonya Salomaa, James Hyndman, David Boutin, Brendan Fletcher, Nadia Litz, Fred Ewanuick	Drama	
Bombay Calling	Samir Mallal		National Film Board Documentary	Indian call centers
Bon Cop, Bad Cop	Érik Canuel	Colm Feore, Patrick Huard, Lucie Laurier, Sarah-Jeanne Labrosse	Comedy	Golden Reel Award, and at $12 million, Bon Cop, Bad Cop ranks as Canada's top-grossing film at the domestic box office.
Brand Upon the Brain!	Guy Maddin	Sullivan Brown	Experimental feature	
Brother Tongue/Langue fraternelle	Daniel Cockburn		Experimental short	
Cheech	Patrice Sauvé	Patrice Robitaille, Fanny Mallette	Comedy, crime drama	
Citizen Duane	Michael Mabbott	Douglas Smith, Alberta Watson, Vivica A. Fox, Rosemary Dunsmore, Donal Logue	Teen comedy	
Civic Duty	Jeff Renfroe	Peter Krause, Khaled Abol Naga, Kari Matchett, Richard Schiff	Drama	Made with U.S. financing
The Conclave	Christoph Schrewe	Manuel Fullola, Brian Blessed, James Faulkner	Historical drama	Co-produced with Germany
Congorama	Philippe Falardeau	Paul Ahmarani, Olivier Gourmet, Claudia Tagbo, Jean-Pierre Cassel, Gabriel Arcand	Drama	
The Danish Poet	Torill Kove	Liv Ullmann (narration)	Animated short produced with the National Film Board	Academy Award for Animated Short Film; Genie Award – Animated Short; Canada-Denmark co-production
The Dark Side of the White Lady	Patricio Henríquez		Documentary	
The Days (Les Jours)	Maxime Giroux	Gildor Roy	Short drama	
The Dead Water (Les Eaux mortes)	Guy Édoin	Monique Miller, Gabriel Gascon	Short	Prix Jutra – Short
Deliver Me (Délivrez-moi)	Denis Chouinard	Céline Bonnier, Geneviève Bujold, Patrice Robitaille, Pierre-Luc Brillant, Juliette Gosselin	Drama	Prix Jutra – Actress (Bonnier)
A Dog's Breakfast	David Hewlett	David Hewlett, Kate Hewlett	Black comedy	Direct to DVD
Driven by Dreams (À force de rêves)	Serge Giguère		Documentary	
Duo	Richard Ciupka	Anick Lemay, François Massicotte, Serge Postigo, Tim Rozon, Gildor Roy	Romantic comedy	
EMPz 4 Life	Allan King		Documentary	
Everything's Gone Green	Paul Fox	Paulo Costanzo, Steph Song, JR Borune, Tom Butler	Comedy, drama	Script by Douglas Coupland
Family History (Histoire de famille)	Michel Poulette	Luc Proulx, Danielle Proulx, Sébastien Huberdeau	Comedy drama	
A Family Secret (Le Secret de ma mère)	Ghyslaine Côté	Ginette Reno, Céline Bonnier	Family drama	
Fido	Andrew Currie	Dylan Baker, Billy Connolly, Carrie-Anne Moss	Zombie comedy	
Finding Dawn	Christine Welsh		National Film Board Documentary	
Flutter	Howie Shia		Animated short co-produced with the National Film Board	Open Entries Grand Prize at the Tokyo Anime Awards
From My Window, Without a Home… (De ma fenêtre, sans maison...)	Maryanne Zéhil		Drama	
The Genius of Crime (Le Génie du crime)	Louis Bélanger	Gilles Renaud, Patrick Drolet, Julie Le Breton, Anne-Marie Cadieux, François Papineau	Crime comedy	
Here and There (Ici par ici)	Diane Obomsawin		Animated short	
House Calls	Ian McLeod	Mark Nowaczynski	National Film Board Documentary	Donald Brittain Award, Gemini Awards; made for TV
Imitation	Federico Hidalgo	Vanessa Bauche, Jesse Aaron Dwyre, Conrad Pla	Comedy drama	
In the Cities (Dans les villes)	Catherine Martin		Drama	
It's a Boy Girl Thing	Nick Hurran	Samaire Armstrong, Kevin Zegers, Sherry Miller, Robert Joy, Sharon Osbourne, Maury Chaykin	Comedy	Canada-U.K co-production made with U.S. financing
Jack and Jacques (Jack et Jacques)	Marie-Hélène Copti	Pierre Lebeau, François Bernier, Guillermina Kerwin	Short drama	
The Journals of Knud Rasmussen	Zacharias Kunuk	Leah Angutimarik, Jens Jørn Spottag, Natar Ungalaaq	Historical Drama	Canada-Denmark-Greenland co-production; TFCA – Best Canadian Film
The Last Kiss	Tony Goldwyn	Zach Braff, Jacinda Barrett, Casey Affleck, Rachel Bilson, Michael Weston, Eric Christian Olsen, Marley Shelton, Harold Ramis, Blythe Danner, Tom Wilkinson	Romantic comedy-drama	
The Limb Salesman	Anais Granofsky	Peter Stebbings, Ingrid Veninger, Clark Johnson, Jackie Burroughs	Drama	
Martyr Street	Shelley Saywell		Documentary	
McLaren's Negatives	Marie-Josée Saint-Pierre		National Film Board Animated documentary	Explores the work of Norman McLaren
Manufactured Landscapes	Jennifer Baichwal	Edward Burtynsky	Documentary	Genie Award – Documentary; Best Canadian Film, Toronto International Film Festival
May God Bless America (Que Dieu bénisse l'Amérique)	Robert Morin	Gildor Roy, Sylvie Léonard, Sylvain Marcel, Normand D'Amour	Drama	
Mirrors (Miroirs d'été)	Étienne Desrosiers	Xavier Dolan, Stéphane Demers	Short drama	
Missing Victor Pellerin (Rechercher Victor Pellerin)	Sophie Deraspe		Mockumentary ""	
Monkey Warfare	Reginald Harkema	Don McKellar, Tracy Wright, Nadia Litz	Drama	
Mount Pleasant	Ross Weber	Benjamin Ratner, Camille Sullivan, Shawn Doyle, Kelly Rowan, Katie Boland, Tygh Runyan	Drama	
Mystic Ball	Greg Hamilton		Documentary	
On the Trail of Igor Rizzi (Sur la trace d'Igor Rizzi)	Noël Mitrani	Laurent Lucas, Pierre-Luc Brillant, Isabelle Blais	Drama	TIFF – Best Canadian First Feature
The Point	Joshua Dorsey	Julie Chauvin	Docufiction produced with the National Film Board	Filmed with area youth in Pointe-Saint-Charles
Queer Duck: The Movie	Xeth Feinberg	Jim J. Bullock, Jackie Hoffman, Kevin Michael Richardson, Billy West, Maurice LaMarche, Jeff Bennett, Tim Curry, Conan O'Brien, David Duchovny	Animated	
Radiant City	Gary Burns, Jim Brown	Mark Kingwell, James Howard Kunstler	Documentary/Fiction made with the National Film Board	Genie Award for Best Documentary
Regarding Sarah	Michelle Porter	Gina Stockdale, Joy Coghill, Tom McBeath	Short drama	
Remembering Arthur	Martin Lavut	Arthur Lipsett	National Film Board Documentary	See also 2010 film Lipsett Diaries
Rock Pockets	Trevor Anderson	Trevor Anderson, Nik Kozub	Short documentary	
Romeo and Juliet	Yves Desgagnés		Drama	
The Saddest Boy in the World	Jamie Travis	Benjamin Smith, Kirsten Robek, Babz Chula	Black comedy	
Screening	Anthony Green	Martha Burns	Short drama	
The Secret Life of Happy People (La vie secrète des gens heureux)	Stéphane Lapointe	Gilbert Sicotte, Marc Paquet, Catherine De Léan, Marie Gignac	Comedy, drama	
She's the Man	Andy Fickman	Amanda Bynes, Channing Tatum, Laura Ramsey, Vinnie Jones, Robert Hoffman, Alex Breckenridge, Julie Hagerty, David Cross	Romantic comedy teen sports	
Slaughtered Vomit Dolls	Lucifer Valentine	Ameara Lavey, Pig Lizzy, Maja Lee	surrealist exploitation psychological horror	
Snapshots for Henry	Teresa Hannigan	Molly Atkinson, Allan Hawco, Zoie Palmer, Dan Petronijevic	Short drama	
Snow Cake	Marc Evans	Alan Rickman, Sigourney Weaver, Carrie-Anne Moss, Emily Hampshire	Drama	Genie Award – Supporting Actress (Moss); Canada-U.K. co-production
The Sparky Book	Mary Lewis	Gordon Pinsent, Joel Thomas Hynes	Animated/live-action	Best Experimental Film, Golden Sheaf Awards
The Spirit of Places (L'Esprit des lieux)	Catherine Martin		Documentary	
Spymate	Robert Vince	Barry Bostwick, Jay Brazeau, Pat Morita, Chris Potter, Richard Kind, Emma Roberts	Comedy, family film	
Steel Toes	David Gow	David Strathairn, Andrew W. Walker	Drama	
A Stone's Throw	Camelia Frieberg	Kris Holden-Ried, Kathryn MacLellan, Aaron Webber	Drama	
A Sunday in Kigali (Un dimanche à Kigali)	Robert Favreau	Fatou N’Diaye, Luc Picard, Céline Bonnier, Maka Kotto	Drama about the Rwanda genocide	Prix Jutra – Editing, Cinematography, Art Direction, Musical Score, Costumes, Makeup
Tales of the Rat Fink	Ron Mann	voices John Goodman, Ann-Margret, Jay Leno	Documentary about Ed Roth	
The Tragic Story of Nling	Jeffrey St. Jules	Tom Barnett, John Neville, Steven McCarthy	Short drama	
Trailer Park Boys: The Movie	Mike Clattenburg	Robb Wells, John Paul Tremblay, Mike Smith, John Dunsworth, Hugh Dillon, Lucy DeCoutere	Comedy	Based on the cable TV series
The Toronto Rap Project	Richard Budman		Documentary about rap music, culture and violence in Toronto	
Unnatural & Accidental	Carl Bessai	Carmen Moore, Callum Keith Rennie, Tantoo Cardinal	Drama	Script and play by Marie Clements; Genie Award - Song
The Wake of Calum MacLeod (Faire Chaluim Mhic Leòid)	Marc Almon	Angus MacLeod	Short drama	
Who Loves the Sun	Matt Bissonnette	Lukas Haas, R.H. Thomson, Wendy Crewson, Adam Scott, Molly Parker	Drama	
The White Planet (La Planète Blanche)	Jean Lemire, Thierry Ragobert, Thierry Piantanida		Documentary	Canada-France coproduction
The Wild	Steve 'Spaz' Williams	voices Kiefer Sutherland, James Belushi	Animated feature	Made with U.S. financing
Without Her (Sans elle)	Jean Beaudin	Karine Vanasse, Marie-Thérèse Fortin, Maxim Gaudette	Thriller	
Young Triffie	Mary Walsh	Fred Ewanuick, Rémy Girard, Andrea Martin, Colin Mochrie, Mary Walsh, Andy Jones, Cathy Jones	Black comedy	

== See also ==
- 2006 in Canada
- 2006 in Canadian television
