= 27th Genie Awards =

2007 Canadian film awards ceremony

- Date: February 13, 2007
- Site: Carlu theatre, Toronto

Highlights
- Best Picture: Bon Cop, Bad Cop

The 27th Genie Awards were held on February 13, 2007 to honour films released in 2006. The ceremony was located at the Carlu theatre in Toronto.

The Rocket (Maurice Richard) was the most successful film at these awards, winning nine of its 13 nominated categories. Bon Cop, Bad Cop won just two of its 10 nominations, although it received the highest 2006 box office revenues in Canada to earn the Golden Reel Award.

== Nominees ==
Nominees were announced 9 January 2007.

Films with the most nominations:

- 13: The Rocket (Maurice Richard)
- 10: Bon Cop, Bad Cop
- 7: A Sunday in Kigali (Un dimanche à Kigali)
- 6: Tideland
- 5: Eve and the Fire Horse
- 5: The Secret Life of Happy People (La Vie secrète des gens heureux)
- 4: Cheech
- 4: The Little Book of Revenge (Guide de la petite vengeance)
- 4: Snow Cake

== Winners ==
Motion Picture	Direction
Bon Cop, Bad Cop — Kevin Tierney; The Little Book of Revenge (Guide de la petite vengeance) — Roger Frappier and Luc Vandal; The Rocket (Maurice Richard) — Denise Robert and Daniel Louis; Trailer Park Boys: The Movie — Barrie Dunn, Mike Clattenburg and Michael Volpe; A Sunday in Kigali (Un dimanche à Kigali) — Lyse Lafontaine and Michael Mosca	Charles Binamé. The Rocket (Maurice Richard); Érik Canuel, Bon Cop, Bad Cop; Robert Favreau, A Sunday in Kigali (Un dimanche à Kigali); Stéphane Lapointe, The Secret Life of Happy People (La Vie secrète des gens heureux); Jean-François Pouliot, The Little Book of Revenge (Guide de la petite vengeance)
Actor in a leading role	Actress in a leading role
Roy Dupuis, The Rocket (Maurice Richard); Colm Feore, Bon Cop, Bad Cop; Olivier Gourmet, Congorama; Patrick Huard, Bon Cop, Bad Cop; Luc Picard, A Sunday in Kigali (Un dimanche à Kigali)	Julie Le Breton, The Rocket (Maurice Richard); Jodelle Ferland, Tideland; Fatou N'Diaye, A Sunday in Kigali (Un dimanche à Kigali); Ginette Reno, A Family Secret (Le secret de ma mère); Sigourney Weaver, Snow Cake
Actor in a supporting role	Actress in a supporting role
Stephen McHattie, The Rocket (Maurice Richard); Hugh Dillon, Trailer Park Boys: The Movie; Robert Joy, Whole New Thing; Lester Chit-Man Chan, Eve and the Fire Horse; Michel Muller, The Little Book of Revenge (Guide de la petite vengeance)	Carrie-Anne Moss, Snow Cake; Caroline Dhavernas, Niagara Motel; Marie Gignac, The Secret Life of Happy People (La Vie secrète des gens heureux); Emily Hampshire, Snow Cake; Vivian Wu, Eve and the Fire Horse
Original Screenplay	Adapted Screenplay
Philippe Falardeau, Congorama; Martin Girard and Ghyslaine Côté, A Family Secret (Le secret de ma mère); Stéphane Lapointe, The Secret Life of Happy People (La Vie secrète des gens heureux); Ken Scott, The Little Book of Revenge (Guide de la petite vengeance); Ken Scott, The Rocket (Maurice Richard)	Robert Favreau and Gil Courtemanche, A Sunday in Kigali (Un dimanche à Kigali); Mike Clattenburg, Robb Wells, Trailer Park Boys: The Movie; François Létourneau, Cheech
Best Live Action Short Drama	Best Animated Short
Red (Le rouge au sol), Maxime Giroux, Paul Barbeau; Big Girl, Renuka Jeyapalan, Anneli Ekborn, Michael Gelfand; Hiro, Matthew Swanson, Oliver-Barnet Lindsay; Jack and Jacques (Jack et Jacques), Marie-Hélène Copti; Snapshots for Henry, Teresa Hannigan, Charlotte Disher	The Danish Poet, Torill Kove, Lise Fearnley and Marcy Page; Tragic Story with Happy Ending (Histoire tragique avec fin heureuse), Regina Pessoa, Patrick Eveno, Abi Feijò, Jacques-Rémy Girerd and Marcel Jean
Art Direction/Production Design	Cinematography
Michel Proulx, The Rocket (Maurice Richard); Jean Bécotte, Bon Cop, Bad Cop; Mary-Ann Liu, Athena Wong, Eve and the Fire Horse; François Séguin, Angel's Rage (La Rage de l'ange); Jasna Stefanovic, Tideland	Pierre Gill, The Rocket (Maurice Richard); Bruce Chun, Bon Cop, Bad Cop; Steve Cosens, Snow Cake; Jan Kiesser, Beowulf & Grendel; Nicola Pecorini, Tideland
Costume Design	Editing
Francesca Chamberland, The Rocket (Maurice Richard); Michelline Amaaq, The Journals of Knud Rasmussen; Sandy Buck, Eve and the Fire Horse; Mario Davignon, Tideland; Annie Dufort, The Secret Life of Happy People (La Vie secrète des gens heureux)	Michel Arcand, The Rocket (Maurice Richard); Jean-François Bergeron, Bon Cop, Bad Cop; Frédérique Broos, Congorama; Michel Grou, Cheech; Lesley Walker, Tideland
Overall Sound	Sound Editing
Dominique Chartrand, Gavin Fernandes, Nathalie Morin and Pierre Paquet, Bon Cop, Bad Cop; Marie-Claude Gagné, Claude La Haye, Bernard Gariépy Strobl and Hans Peter Strobl, A Sunday in Kigali (Un dimanche à Kigali); Claude Hazanavicius, Claude Beaugrand, Luc Boudrias and Bernard Gariépy Strobl, The Rocket (Maurice Richard); David Lee, Douglas Cooper and Robert Farr, Tideland; Daniel Pellerin, Gashtaseb Ariana and Jeff Carter, Eve and the Fire Horse	Claude Beaugrand, Olivier Calvert, Jérôme Décarie, Natalie Fleurant, Francine Poirier, The Rocket (Maurice Richard); Pierre-Jules Audet, Guy Francoeur, Guy Pelletier, Cheech; Marie-Claude Gagné, A Sunday in Kigali (Un dimanche à Kigali); Christian Rivest, Valéry Dufort-Boucher, Tchae Measroch, Bon Cop, Bad Cop; Jane Tattersall, Barry Gilmore, David McCallum, Donna Powell, Dave Rose, Beowulf & Grendel
Achievement in Music: Original Score	Achievement in Music: Original Song
Jean Robitaille, Without Her (Sans elle); Normand Corbeil, Cheech; Michel Cusson, The Rocket (Maurice Richard); Pierre Desrochers, The Secret Life of Happy People (La Vie secrète des gens heureux); Hilmar Orn Hilmarsson, Beowulf & Grendel	Jennifer Kreisberg, "Have Hope" — Unnatural & Accidental; Dan Bigras, "L'Astronaute" — Angel's Rage (La Rage de l'ange); Bramwell Tovey and Richard Bell, "In a Heartbeat" — Eighteen; Éric Lapointe, Stéphane Dufour and Jamil, "Tattoo" — Bon Cop, Bad Cop; Patrick Watson and Caroline Dhavernas, "Trace-Moi" — The Beautiful Beast (La belle bête)
Documentary	Special awards
Manufactured Landscapes, Jennifer Baichwal, Nicholas de Pencier, Gerry Flahive, Daniel Iron and Peter Starr; The White Planet (La Planète Blanche), Jean Lemire, Thierry Piantanida, Thierry Ragobert	Achievement in Make-Up: Nick Dudman, Beowulf & Grendel; Claude Jutra Award: Julia Kwan, Eve and the Fire Horse and Stéphane Lapointe, The Secret Life of Happy People (La Vie secrète des gens heureux); Golden Reel Award: Bon Cop, Bad Cop
