= 9th Jutra Awards =

Awards show for Quebecois cinema

The 9th Jutra Awards were held on February 18, 2007 to honour films made with the participation of the Quebec film industry in 2006.

Bon Cop, Bad Cop received a leading thirteen nominations, but ended up only winning the award for Best Editing and the Billet d'or award.

A Sunday in Kigali (Un dimanche à Kigali) received twelve nominations and won six awards, but the night's big winner was Congorama, who won five awards from seven nominations, including Best Film, Best Director and Best Screenplay. The film also won two acting awards: both Paul Ahmarani and Olivier Gourmet were jointly awarded Best Actor, while Gabriel Arcand won Best Supporting Actor. This was both Ahmarani's and Arcand's second acting award as they both had previously won Best Actor for The Left-Hand Side of the Fridge (La moitié gauche du frigo) and Post Mortem respectively.

Céline Bonnier became the first actress to be nominated for both Best Actress and Best Supporting Actress during the same ceremony twice, having previously achieved this feat two years earlier. She ended up winning Best Actress for Deliver Me (Délivrez-moi).

C.R.A.Z.Y., who had won fifteen awards the year before, extended its record by winning Most Successful Film Outside Quebec for the second year in a row.

== Winners and nominees ==
Best Film	Best Director
Congorama — Luc Déry, Kim McCraw; Bon Cop, Bad Cop — Kevin Tierney; The Secret Life of Happy People (La vie secrète des gens heureux) — Roger Frappier, Luc Vandal; A Sunday in Kigali (Un dimanche à Kigali) — Lyse Lafontaine, Michael Mosca	Philippe Falardeau, Congorama; Érik Canuel, Bon Cop, Bad Cop; Robert Favreau, A Sunday in Kigali (Un dimanche à Kigali); Claude Gagnon, Kamataki
Best Actor	Best Actress
Paul Ahmarani, Congorama; Olivier Gourmet, Congorama; Marc Béland, The Little Book of Revenge (Guide de la petite vengeance); Colm Feore, Bon Cop, Bad Cop; Patrick Huard, Bon Cop, Bad Cop; Luc Picard, A Sunday in Kigali (Un dimanche à Kigali)	Céline Bonnier, Deliver Me (Délivrez-moi); Fatou N'Diaye, A Sunday in Kigali (Un dimanche à Kigali); Danielle Proulx, Family History (Histoire de famille); Ginette Reno, A Family Secret (Le secret de ma mère)
Best Supporting Actor	Best Supporting Actress
Gabriel Arcand, Congorama; Gabriel Gascon, The Little Book of Revenge (Guide de la petite vengeance); Pierre Lebeau, Bon Cop, Bad Cop; Gilles Renaud, The Secret Life of Happy People (La vie secrète des gens heureux)	Fanny Mallette, Cheech; Céline Bonnier, A Sunday in Kigali (Un dimanche à Kigali); Anne Dorval, The Secret Life of Happy People (La vie secrète des gens heureux); Lucie Laurier, Bon Cop, Bad Cop
Best Screenplay	Best Documentary
Philippe Falardeau, Congorama; Leila Basen, Alex Epstein, Patrick Huard and Kevin Tierney, Bon Cop, Bad Cop; Stéphane Lapointe, The Secret Life of Happy People (La vie secrète des gens heureux); Robert Morin, May God Bless America (Que Dieu bénisse l’Amérique)	Driven by Dreams (À force de rêves) — Serge Giguère; The Dark Side of the White Lady (Le côté obscur de la Dame Blanche) — Patricio Henríquez; Notre Père — Marie-Julie Dallaire; The River Where We Live (Un fleuve humain) — Sylvain L'Espérance
Best Live Short	Best Animated Short
The Dead Water (Les eaux mortes) — Guy Édoin; À L'ombre — Simon Lavoie; The Days (Les jours) — Maxime Giroux; Sunday (Petit dimanche) — Nicolas Roy	McLaren's Negatives — Marie-Josée Saint-Pierre; Here and There (Ici par ici) — Diane Obomsawin; Jaime Lo, Small and Shy (Jaime Lo, petite et timide) — Lillian Chan; The Man Who Waited (L'Homme qui atttendait) — Theodore Ushev
Best Art Direction	Best Cinematography
André-Line Beauparlant, A Sunday in Kigali (Un dimanche à Kigali); Jean Bécotte, Bon Cop, Bad Cop; Patrice Bengle, Deliver Me (Délivrez-moi); François Laplante, Black Eyed Dog	Pierre Mignot, A Sunday in Kigali (Un dimanche à Kigali); Yves Bélanger, Cheech; Allen Smith, The Little Book of Revenge (Guide de la petite vengeance); André Turpin, Congorama
Best Costume Design	Best Editing
Michèle Hamel, A Sunday in Kigali (Un dimanche à Kigali); Anne Duceppe, The Genius of Crime (Le génie du crime); François Laplante, Black Eyed Dog; Ginette Magny, A Family Secret (Le secret de ma mère)	Jean-François Bergeron, Bon Cop, Bad Cop; Hélène Girard, A Sunday in Kigali (Un dimanche à Kigali); Denis Papillon, Family History (Histoire de famille); Arthur Tarnowski, Duo
Best Hair	Best Makeup
Ginette Cérat-Lajeunesse, A Family Secret (Le secret de ma mère); Johanne Paiement, Bon Cop, Bad Cop; Denis Parent, Without Her (Sans elle); Martin Rivest, The Genius of Crime (Le génie du crime)	Marie-Angèle Breitner, A Sunday in Kigali (Un dimanche à Kigali); Claudette Beaudoin-Casavant, Bon Cop, Bad Cop; Marie-Angèle Breitner, A Family Secret (Le secret de ma mère); Nicole Lapierre, Angel's Rage (La rage de l'ange)
Best Original Music	Best Sound
Jorane, A Sunday in Kigali (Un dimanche à Kigali); Benoît Charest, The Little Book of Revenge (Guide de la petite vengeance); Michel Corriveau, Bon Cop, Bad Cop; Jorane, Kamataki	Claude La Haye, Hans Peter Strobl and Marie-Claude Gagné, A Sunday in Kigali (Un dimanche à Kigali); Dominique Chartrand, Christian Rivest, Gavin Fernandes and Pierre Paquet, Bon Cop, Bad Cop; Mario Auclair, Pierre-Jules Audet and Stéphane Bergeron, Cheech; Normand Mercier, Michel B. Bordeleau and Geoffrey Mitchell, Family History (Histoire de famille); Michel Charron, Louis Dupire, Jean-François Sauvé, Hans Peter Strobl and Bernard Gariépy Strobl, Without Her (Sans elle)
Special Awards
Jutra Hommage: Pierre Curzi; Most Successful Film Outside Quebec: C.R.A.Z.Y.; Billet d'or: Bon Cop, Bad Cop

== Multiple wins and nominations ==
=== Films with multiple nominations ===
Nominations	Film
13	Bon Cop, Bad Cop
12	A Sunday in Kigali (Un dimanche à Kigali)
7	Congorama
4	A Family Secret (Le secret de ma mère)
4	The Little Book of Revenge (Guide de la petite vengeance)
4	The Secret Life of Happy People (La vie secrète des gens heureux)
3	Cheech
3	Family History (Histoire de famille)
2	Black Eyed Dog
2	Deliver Me (Délivrez-moi)
2	The Genius of Crime (Le génie du crime)
2	Kamataki
2	Without Her (Sans elle)

=== Films with multiple wins ===
Wins	Film
6	A Sunday in Kigali (Un dimanche à Kigali)
5	Congorama
2	Bon Cop, Bad Cop
