= Gilles Renaud =

Canadian actor (born 1944)

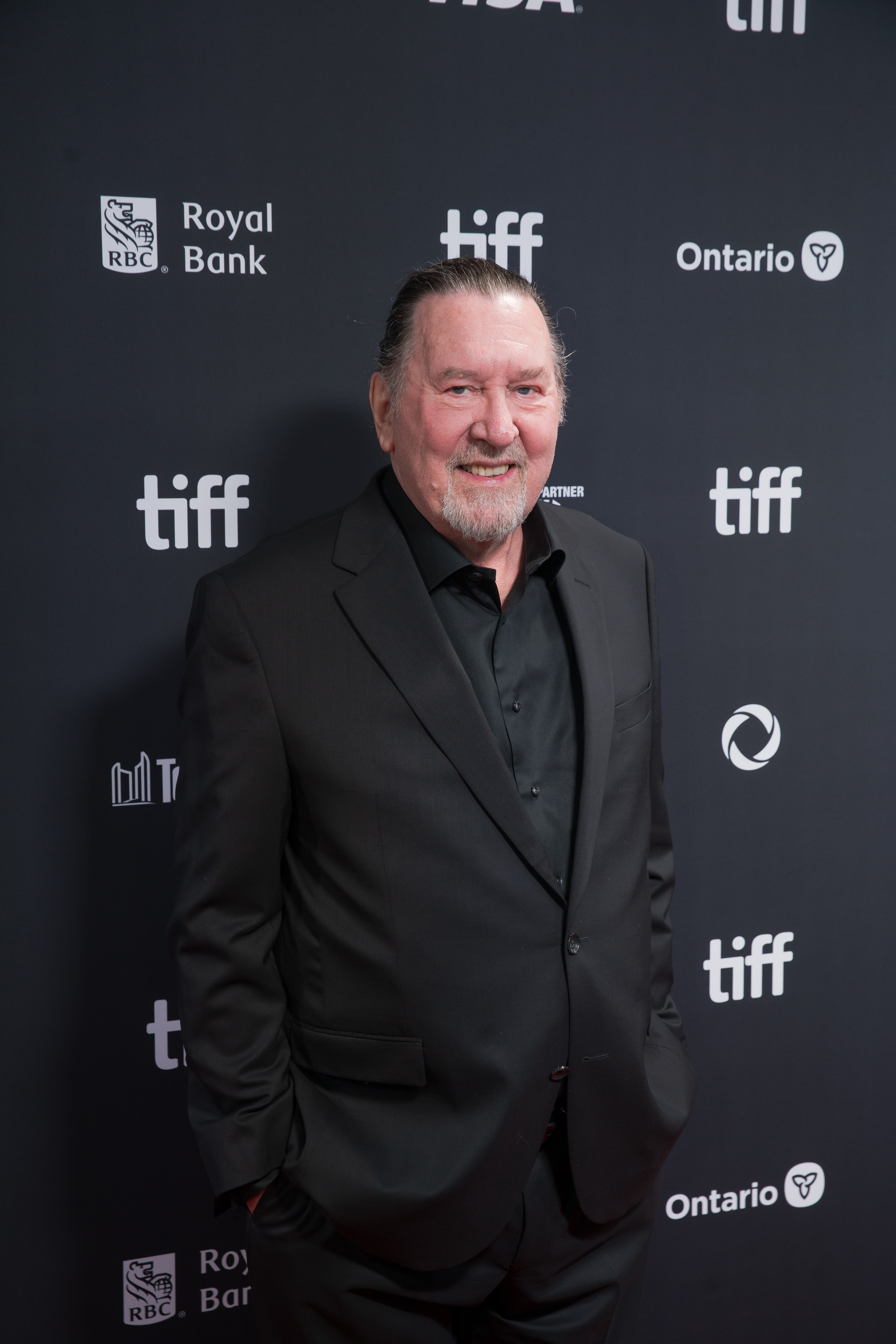
- Gilles Renaud 2025
- Born: 25 September 1944 (age 82); Montreal, Quebec
- Occupation: Actor

Gilles Renaud (born 25 September 1944) is a Canadian actor who has starred in cinema and television in Quebec.

In 1983, he received a Genie Award nomination for Best Actor for the film A Day in a Taxi (Une journée en taxi). He is also a two-time Jutra Award nominee for Best Supporting Actor, receiving nods at the 9th Jutra Awards in 2007 for The Secret Life of Happy People (La Vie secrète des gens heureux) and at the 16th Jutra Awards in 2014 for The Dismantling (Le Démantèlement).

In 2016, he appeared in the film Bad Seeds. While heavily involved in that production, he filmed a death scene for his character in his TV series Mémoires Vives, which began airing in 2013. In 2017, he starred in François Girard's film Hochelaga, Land of Souls, as a Montreal archaeologist in search of Hochelaga.

== Filmography ==
=== Film ===
Year	Title	Role	Notes
1972	Exile (L'Exil)		
1972	Ô ou l'invisible enfant		
1973	The Conquest (La Conquête)	Laurent	
1974	Once Upon a Time in the East (Il était une fois dans l'est)	Cuirette	
1975	The Mob (La Gammick)	Police officer	
1976	La Piastre	Philippe Tremblay	
1976	Far from You Sweetheart (Je suis loin de toi mignonne)	Méo	
1977	The Late Blossom (Le soleil se lève en retard)	Yvon Thériault	
1977	One Man	Second Hood	
1979	To Be Sixteen (Avoir 16 ans)	Psychiatrist	
1980	The Handyman (L'Homme à tout faire)	Armand St-Amant	
1980	Fantastica		
1980	The Red Kitchen (La cuisine rouge)	Le père	
1981	De jour en jour	Colbert	
1981	The Plouffe Family (Les Plouffe)	Phil Talbot	
1982	A Day in a Taxi (Une journée en taxi)	Johnny	
1984	A Woman in Transit (La femme de l'hôtel)		
1985	The Dame in Colour (La Dame en couleurs)		
1986	The Heart Exposed (Le Cœur découvert)	Jean-Marc	
1987	Brother André (Le Frère André)	Dr. Charette	
1989	Sous les draps, les étoiles		
1991	Love Crazy (Amoureux fou)	Rick	
1993	The Sex of the Stars (Le Sexe des étoiles)	Jacob	
2001	The Woman Who Drinks (La Femme qui boit)	Brunelle	
2003	Gaz Bar Blues	Gaston Savard	
2004	Tideline (Littoral)	Le père	
2005	The Outlander (Le Survenant)		
2006	Bon Cop, Bad Cop	Michel Grossbut	
2006	The Secret Life of Happy People (La Vie secrète des gens heureux)	Jean-Pierre	
2006	Cheech	Paluchi	
2006	Romeo and Juliet (Roméo et Juliette)	Réal Rex Lamontagne	
2006	The Genius of Crime (Le Génie du crime)	Rolly	
2008	The Deserter (Le Déserteur)	Gordon Coutu	
2009	Cadavres	Ronald Maisonneuve	
2010	Mourning for Anna (Trois temps après la mort d'Anna)	Enquêteur	
2010	The Comeback (Cabotins)	Roger Boucher	
2010	Route 132	Curé de Saint-André	
2010	Tough Luck (Y'en aura pas de facile)		
2010	The Hair of the Beast (Le poil de la bête)	Seigneur de Beauport	
2012	Laurence Anyways	Council President	
2013	The Dismantling (Le Démantèlement)		
2016	Bad Seeds (Les Mauvaises herbes)	Simon Boulerice	
2017	Hochelaga, Land of Souls (Hochelaga, terre des âmes)	Antoine Morin	
2019	Vu pas vue	Father	
2021	The Guide to the Perfect Family (Le Guide de la famille parfaite)		
2021	La Contemplation du mystère		
2025	Peak Everything (Amour Apocalypse)		

=== Television ===
Year	Title	Role	Notes
