= Eugene Rivers =

American activist

Eugene F. Rivers
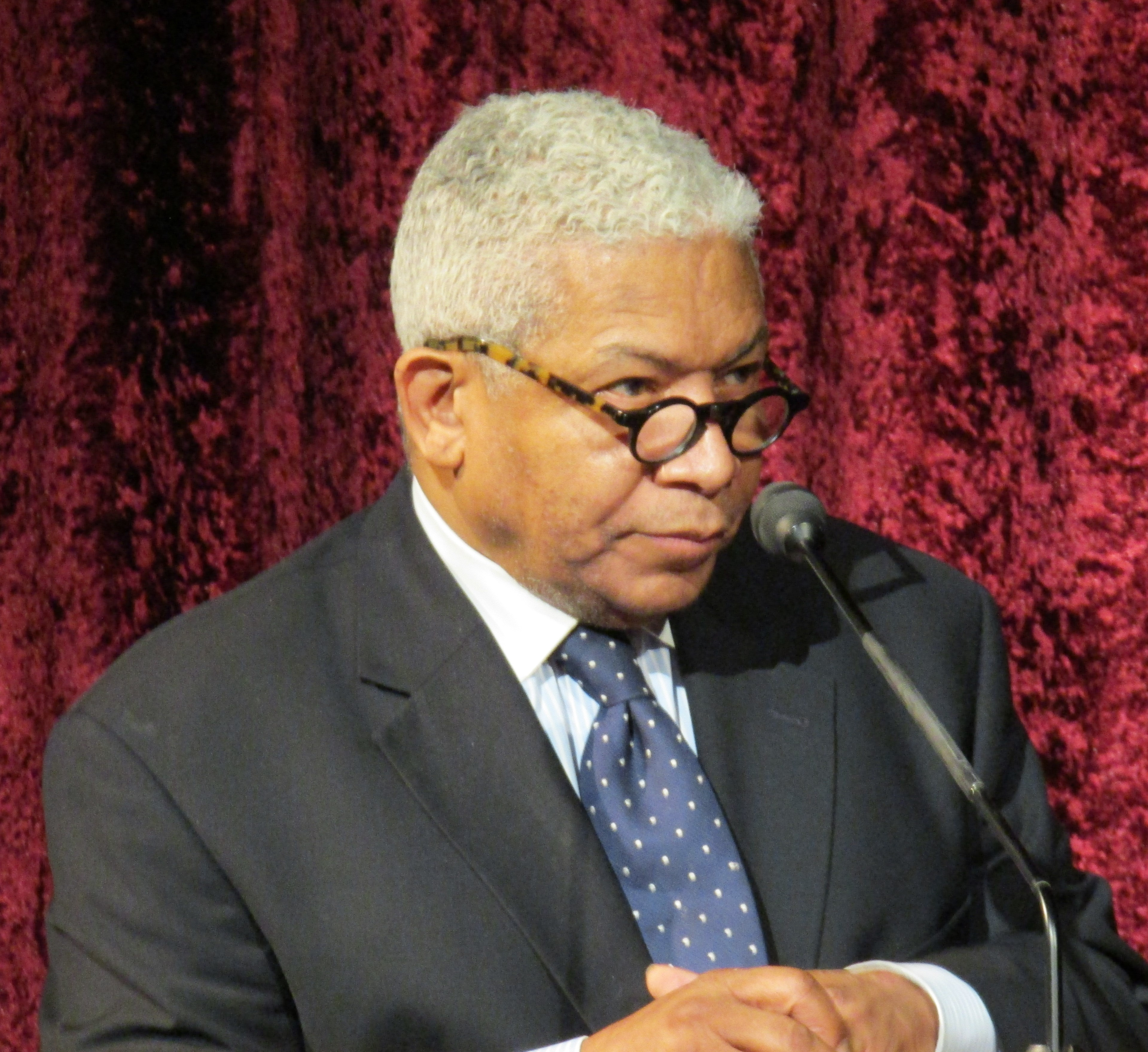

Personal details
- Born: April 9, 1950 (age 76)
- Denomination: Pentecostal
- Spouse: Jacqueline Rivers
- Profession: Azusa Christian Community
- Education: Murrell Dobbins Vocational High School

Eugene "Rib" F. Rivers III (born April 9, 1950) is a conservative American activist, and Pentecostal minister based in Boston, Massachusetts.

Rivers is known for his work developing programs that reduce urban violence. He has also been both an activist and a thought leader in the areas of Black economic empowerment and urban renewal.

== Biography ==
Eugene Franklin Rivers, III, was born in Boston, Massachusetts, on April 9, 1950. His parents were Eugene F. Rivers II and Mildred Bell Rivers. He grew up in Chicago, Illinois, and Philadelphia, Pennsylvania. Rivers attended the Murrell Dobbins Vocational High School, where he was on the gymnastics team and studied commercial art. His classmates nicknamed him "Rib." He graduated in 1968. He claims he was a gang member in Philadelphia, but left the gang, after being mentored by Reverend Benjamin Smith, the pastor of Deliverance Evangelistic Temple. After high school, Rivers began his involvement in activism in Philadelphia. He joined Black Church-affiliated movements working on economic empowerment and urban redevelopment. He was connected with the Black Economic Development Conference, and supported James Forman's efforts to obtain reparations from churches and synagogues in the United States.

In 1974, Rivers was ironically the subject of a vérité styled documentary, Black at Yale: A Film Diary. The film traces Rivers travails as a classroom crasher, and a dorm squatter, in his attempts to gain admittance to Old Blue. His efforts, unsurprisingly, ended in failure as he was never a student, faculty, or staff at Yale University.

While living in New Haven from 1973 to 1976, Rivers sustained himself by "hustling welfare checks in three states" and "selling reefer." According to him:

"Oh, I had a bunch of little hustles. I would sell nickel bags for thirty-five dollars, make up stupid names, hustle welfare checks, and run back and forth between Philly and New York and New Haven and collect checks; you know, street hustler."

Rivers moved to Boston in 1978, intent on attending Harvard University as an older/non-traditional student (he was twenty-eight years old at the time). He was encouraged to apply, but as with Yale, he also never graduated from Harvard University. In 1984, he founded the Azusa Christian Community in Dorchester, serving as pastor. He also founded the Ella J. Baker House, in Dorchester, as a community youth center. Concerned about gang violence, and the number of youth being killed by gun violence, he joined with other Black clergy to found the Boston TenPoint Coalition in 1992. The Coalition's efforts worked on reducing violence in Boston's neighborhoods. This time period became known at the "Boston Miracle." Rivers became co-chair of the National TenPoint Leadership Foundation, and was widely seen as an expert on strategies for reducing urban violence that impacts African Americans.

Rivers met with George H.W. Bush in a gathering discussing urban issues. He has appeared on national television shows, including Hardball with Chris Matthews with Michael Rogers defending Rick Warren. He was featured on the cover of Newsweek magazine in 1998, and he was written about in Commonwealth Magazine 1999.

Rivers' essay The Responsibility of Black Intellectuals in the Age of Crack published under the new editorship of Joshua Cohen in the Boston Review led to debate in circles in New England.

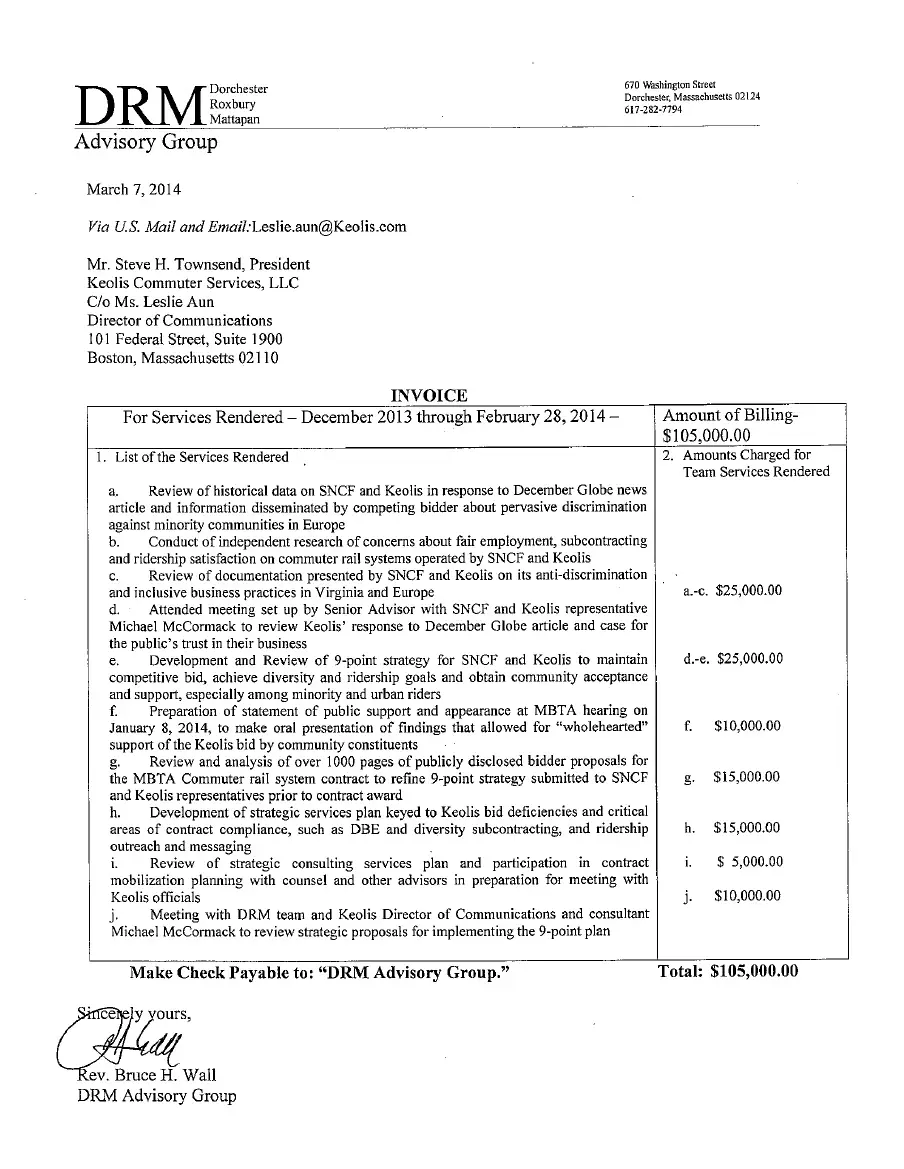
The "shakedown" invoice sent by Rev Eugene Rivers to Keolis demanding $105,000.

== Keolis Contract ==
In the early spring of 2014, the Massachusetts Bay Transportation Authority (MBTA) awarded a contract to Keolis, a transportation company, to operate commuter rail services in the commonwealth. This decision sparked significant scrutiny and concern from various community leaders, including Eugene Rivers and Jeffrey Wall, who raised alarms about the potential impacts of the contract, particularly regarding issues of equity, access, and service quality.

As part of their advocacy efforts, Rivers and Wall were the leaders of the newly created DRM Group (the letters standing for Dorchester, Roxbury, and Mattapan). The DRM Group, purported to play a role in advocating for accountability from Keolis.

Rivers and Wall then issued an invoice demanding $105,000 from Keolis. WGBH journalist, Callie Crossley said of the incident at the time:

All of this craziness surrounding them [Wall and Rivers] makes it looks like this was just some greed/quid pro quo thing. And not this is a serious issue. You know to look at who's going to be hired and, you know, how ... what positions they're going to hold in a city that is majority minority.

In its reporting on the incident, WGBH dubbed the incident "Keolisgate".

Amid the controversy surrounding the financial demands made by the group, Wall resigned from the short-lived DRM Group.

== Apology to the Cape Verdean Community ==
Rivers angered many Cape Verdeans last month when he partially blamed violence involving Cape Verdeans on a lack of male leadership. Appearing on the WGBH television show "Greater Boston," on May 13, 2003 Rivers said:

"You got a bunch of young dudes who are out of control because the community is largely... leaderless in terms of male leadership."

"The women are doing what every good mom does, trying to keep Pedro or Julio or whatever the hell his name is out of trouble..."

"Where are the men? You got all these guys up-and-down Dudley street (in the Roxbury Neighborhood of Boston) where these guys hanging out sipping beer. Ya know? Telling lies. Ya know. Talking about the women they run around with. Right? These guys need to be challenged."

Rivers later issued something of an apology to the Cape Verdean community stating, that his comments "on the very delicate subjects of race, crime, and nationality were, I understand, a source of pain, anger and misunderstanding."

== The Ella Baker House Allegations ==
Rivers founded and lead the Ella J. Baker House, a nonprofit organization that works with at-risk youth and former offenders. In this role he and the organization have faced numerous allegations of using intimidation and even violence against communities of color.

Gerald Jones alleged that he had been assaulted and claimed the attack was ordered by Rivers as retaliation for a discrimination complaint Jones had filed against the Ella Baker House. Jones, a formerly incarcerated person who was living in a halfway house run by the organization, alleged in his complaint that Rivers had kicked him out of the program because he was a Muslim. While Rivers denied any official connection to the halfway house, Jones believed the assault was "for Eugene" as a form of revenge.

Rivers has also been accused of orchestrating an assault on a 15-year-old child named Kuron Cox. Kuron's stepfather said the teen was "assaulted so badly, he spent four days in the Boston Medical Center intensive care unit." Kuron now accuses Rivers of "doing evil in the name of God."

Beyond physical violence, Rivers has been accused of using intimidation tactics against other clergy members. A former gang member who worked at the Baker House confronted Reverend Jeffery Brown and told him not to "fuck with the women at the Baker House."

The most serious allegations against Rivers involve a 2017 incident in which a 17-year-old client of the Baker House was allegedly raped by a staff member on the premises. According to reports, Rivers tried to dissuade the victim from reporting the assault to the Boston Police. While the alleged rapist was charged, a grand jury investigation considered whether Rivers had broken the law by attempting to cover up the incident.

The fallout from the rape allegation has been significant for Rivers and the Baker House. Funding sources, including the state government and the Boston Police Department, have cut ties with the organization. Rivers is now reportedly planning to step down from his leadership role.

Despite his controversial reputation, Rivers has maintained significant political influence over the years, with politicians "lining up Rivers's support" and "showering the Pentecostal minister and his causes with faith-based partnership grants." However, his alleged misconduct has increasingly led some of his powerful supporters to distance themselves from him.

== Views ==
Rivers is a political conservative. He is pro-life; and against gay, lesbian, and trans marriage. Rivers spoke at the National Organization for Marriage's Marriage March in 2014 to oppose marriage equality in advance of the United States Supreme Court hearing arguments in Obergefell v. Hodges.

Rivers has long described himself as a "secret ops" player in Boston-area politics.

He has unique views on the state of the Black community in the US compared to their enslaved ancestors. In an essay penned in 1992 has stated:

"Unlike many of our ancestors, who came out of slavery and entered this century with strong backs, discipline, a thirst for literacy, deep religious faith, and hope in the face of monumental adversity, we have produced 'a generation who [do] not know the ways of the Lord'—a 'new jack' generation, ill-equipped to secure gainful employment even as productive slaves."

Rivers is a strong advocate for the Black community being civilly responsible and is quick to chastise the community for not being politically engaged. However, Rivers himself spent the eighties, nineties, aughts, and beyond not voting. This even applied to candidates he endorsed and campaigned for. Linda Dorcena Forry, a Haitian-American woman who ran for mayor of Boston in 2013, said of Rivers:

“The hypocrisy is disgraceful, particularly when we consider the blood, sweat, and tears that have gone into securing the right to vote for all, especially for African-Americans and women.”

== Family ==
Rivers is married to Jacqueline Olga Cooke-Rivers, who earned her PhD at Harvard University under the tutelage of Orlando Patterson.

Rivers' parents, Mildred Bell Rivers and Eugene F. Rivers, Jr., were members of the Nation of Islam. They met as students at the Colored Normal Industrial Agricultural and Mechanical College of South Carolina. Both of his parents served in the U.S. military during World War II.

Mose Rivers, the paternal great-grandfather of Eugene, was born a slave.

== See also ==
- GTA Faith Alliance
- The Toronto Rap Project
