= Meanwhile (1998 film) =

1998 Canadian short film

- French: Pendant ce temps...
- Directed by: Ghyslaine Côté
- Written by: Martin Girard; Ghyslaine Côté
- Story by: Martin Girard
- Produced by: Robert Lacerte
- Starring: Carmen Ferlan; Gérard Poirier; Ghyslaine Côté; Catherine Pépin; Jocelyne Zucco; Ronald Houle; Huguette Oligny; David Boutin; Rachel Fontaine
- Cinematography: Bruno Philip
- Edited by: Richard Comeau
- Music by: Rudy Toussain
- Production company: Les Films Lacerte
- Distributed by: France Films; Antenna
- Release date: November 1998 (Abitibi-Témiscamingue)
- Running time: 13 minutes
- Country: Canada
- Language: French

Meanwhile (French: Pendant ce temps...) is a 1998 Canadian short suspense film directed and co-written by Ghyslaine Côté, who also acts in the short. The story jumps around a greasy spoon's several patrons and two waitresses, oblivious to a bomb under one of the tables, the timer set for five minutes.

== Plot ==
In a Montréal restaurant, two waitresses (Carmen Ferland and Jocelyne Zucco) serve dishes, chatting between themselves about a love interest, and with the customers.

A portly man (Ronald Houle) orders a second dish which he does not eat, enjoying the smell and his sense of victory for avoiding fat and cholesterol. A mother and her young daughter (Ghyslaine Côté and Catherine Pépin) wait for a man to arrive. An elegant older woman (Huguette Oligny) catches the eye of another older diner (Gérard Poirier). Outside the café a lovers' quarrel is going on between a young man and woman (David Boutin and Rachel Fontaine).

A man in a jacket (Frank Schorpion) sits at a reserved table, and sticks a dynamite time bomb underneath it. Told the table is reserved, he rises and makes a phone call using the restaurant's phone, just as two English-speaking mafiosi (Bruno Di Quenzio and Manuel Tadros) enter and sit at the same table. The bomber takes out a pack of cigarettes in which he has hidden an instrument for setting the timer remotely, and sets it for five minutes. A sequence of images follows of everyone else lit up with white light.

The bomber goes outside and rights a trash bin which had been knocked over during the lovers' quarrel. He dumps the remote and departs. Inside, a mafioso receives a phone call, swears in frustration, and both men leave without ordering. The little girl notices something under the reserved table. The quarrellers enter and sit at the table. The older man makes his way towards the older lady but stops short and sits in the booth of the portly man.

The couple continue their quarrel, the older lady looking at them sympathetically. The little girl, called Josée-Marguerite, watches the bomb, whose timer now reads 3:15. Her mother chides her for staring at other people and she responds that there is something flashing under the table. Her mother looks, but sees only the young man's knee, and asks why the girl is making things up. Josée-Marguerite shrugs.

As the timer reaches 2:55, the portly man observes the older lady in the reflection of the older man's pocket watch. He notices a flashing red light as well, but is distracted as the older man says "That woman's dynamite!" He explains that he is taking his time, not wanting to scare her off, and compares her to Bambi. He needs to make a move quickly after all when she asks for the bill. She only ate a bit of everything in her role as a food critic. The first waitress declares the meal free, takes the plate, trips as the older man tries to go past her, and finds herself sitting in the booth with the portly man, the dish now in front of him.

The timer reaches 2:35. The mother leaves the booth to check if her boyfriend is arriving. The portly man decides it is his fate to eat the cholesterol-heavy meal. Despite her mother telling her to sit quietly, Josée-Marguerite leaves their booth to get a closer look at the bomb. She points at it and asks "What is that?" — but just then her mother arrives and admonishes her. The young woman places her hands on the table with some force and the bomb is half dislodged underneath. She says she is going to the washroom and her boyfriend had better have changed his attitude by the time she gets back.

The portly man orders coffee and cigarettes. The timer counts down to 0:59, and the older lady rises and whispers advice to the young man on her way out. She pauses and smiles at the older man and he gets up to follow her while the timer counts down to 0:42. He is delayed by a new patron coming through the door — the mother's awaited boyfriend (Luc Senay). She asks Josée-Marguerite what it was she had wanted to say earlier, but the frustrated girl says it is "too late" as the timer counts down to 0:28.

The young couple are reconciled, which pleases the older lady looking through the window. The older man continues to struggle with the door. The timer counts down from 0:10 to 0:03 — and stops. The older lady has found the remote in the bin outside. She flips a switch and the timer continues down to 0:01. She flips it again and holds it to her ear and shakes it, finally giving up and throwing it into the bin. She is followed by the older man as she leaves. Inside, the portly man enjoys the older lady's leftovers, Josée-Marguerite meets her mother's boyfriend, the waitresses finally have time to catch up on each other's news, and the young couple kiss passionately. The bomb remains half-dislodged, the timer still showing 0:01.

== Cast ==
Main

- Carmen Ferland • 1st waitress
- Gérard Poirier • Old man (Vieux monsieur)
- Ghyslaine Côté • Mother
- Catherine Pépin • Little girl
- Jocelyne Zucco • 2nd waitress
- Ronald Houle • Portly man (Gros monsieur)
- Huguette Oligny • Elegant old lady (Belle dame)
- David Boutin • Man in love
- Rachel Fontaine • Woman in love

Supporting

- Luc Senay • Mother's boyfriend
- Frank Schorpion • Man with the bomb
- Bruno Di Quenzio • Smiling mafioso
- Manuel Tadros • Severe mafioso

Extras who appear in the film include Jonathan Ward, Anick Pélisson, Pierre Lalonde, Catherine Bigacoett, Silvain D'Auteuil, Melissa Dion, Esther Hardy, Virginie Lajeunesse, and Marilou Nadeau.

== Themes ==
Huguette Roberge points out that the main characters in Meanwhile are involved in one kind of love story or another, whether young, old, or in the midst of a crisis.

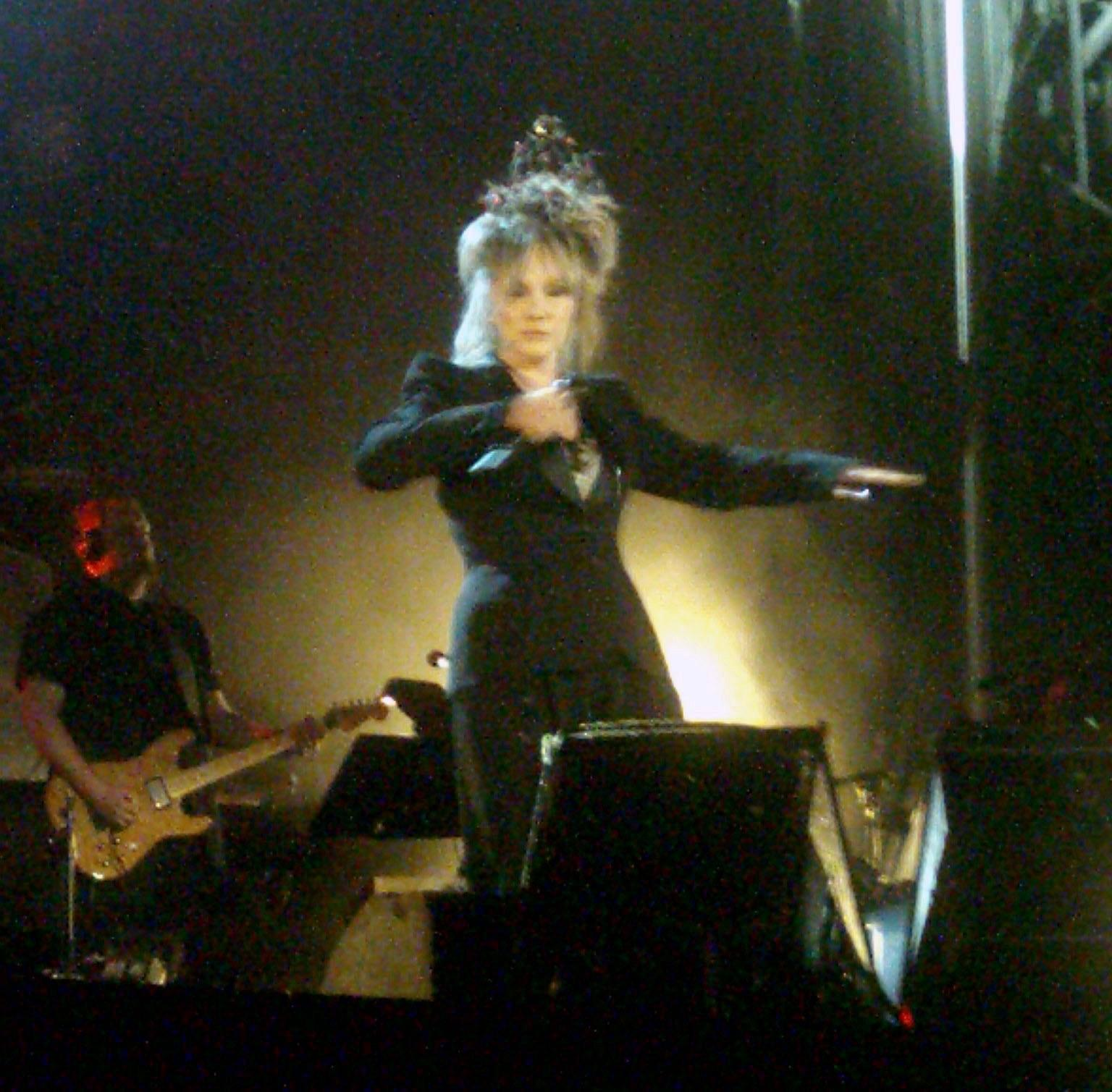
Diane Dufresne in 2010

== Production ==
=== Financing ===
Meanwhile received funding from federal and provincial government bodies including the National Film Board of Canada, the Conseil des arts et des lettres du Québec, and SODEC.

=== Filming and music ===
Meanwhile was shot in Montréal at the Chez Thérèse restaurant, on 35 mm movie film.

In addition to Rudy Toussain's incidental music, there is a song that plays with the end credits, Diane Dufresne's "J'ai rencontré l'homme de ma vie" (composed by François Cousineau with lyrics by Luc Plamondon), from Dufresne's second studio album Tiens-toé ben j'arrive!'

== Release and reception ==
Très applaudi à Rouyn-Noranda, et bientôt servi également en salle à Montréal et Laval en complément de programme de Paparazzi d'Alain Berberian, Pendant ce temps... de la réalisatrice et actrice Ghyslaine Côté, est un palpitant « suspense humoristique », qui garde le spectateur en haleine durant 13 minutes. Dans un casse-croûte, se croisent plusieurs histoires d'amour débutantes, en crise, ou tardives, alors qu'un compte a rebours a commencé et que tout risque de sauter d'un moment à l'autre... Surprise et sourire garantis. Avec des acteurs attachants...

— Huguette Roberge

Meanwhile premiered in November 1998 at the 17th Abitibi-Témiscamingue International Film Festival in Rouyn-Noranda. In addition to festivals, Meanwhile was shown in commercial theatres in cities like Montreal and Laval, Quebec accompanying a main feature (Alain Berbérian's Paparazzi), and was broadcast on Canadian television (TV Quatre Saisons and TV5 in 1999).

=== Critical response ===
André Lavoie called Meanwhile a hard-hitting film. Huguette Roberge described it as a funny suspense film (suspense humoristique) that keeps the viewer on the edge of their seat through thirteen minutes, with appealing actors, guaranteeing both surprises and smiles. According to Manon Dumais, it was compared to the films of Martin Scorsese and Brian De Palma.

=== Audience response ===
According to Huguette Roberge, Meanwhile was very well received at Rouyn-Noranda, Montréal, and Laval.

=== Accolades ===
Awards

- Stony Brook Film Festival • First Prize
- Cabbagetown Short Film Festival (Toronto) • First Prize

Nominations

In 1998, the short was nominated for a Prix Jutra and a Genie Award in the Best Short Film category.
