= Jacqueline Rivers =

American sociologist

- Born: Jamaica
- Spouse: Eugene F. Rivers, III

Academic background
- Education: Harvard University (PhD); Harvard Radcliffe College (BA, MA)
- Thesis: On the Nature of Cultural Capital: The Reinforcing Action of Non-Elite Forms and Racial Differences in Student Achievement in the Middle Class (2014)

Academic work
- Discipline: Sociology

Jacqueline Olga Cooke-Rivers is an American sociologist and a Senior Fellow at The King's College in New York City.

== Career ==
She has taught as a lecturer in sociology at Harvard University. She is the Director of the Seymour Institute for Black Church and Policy Studies and a former member of the Commission on Unalienable Rights.

Rivers was born in Jamaica. She attended Harvard Radcliffe College, from which she earned a Bachelor of Arts and Master of Arts in psychology. She then earned a Doctor of Philosophy from Harvard University in 2014.

She is married to Eugene F. Rivers, III and lives in Dorchester, Boston.
