= GTA Faith Alliance =

Multi-faith charitable organisation

The GTA Faith Alliance is a multi-faith charitable organization which works to create educational and employment opportunities to divert at-risk youth from gangs and crime. The alliance was founded in February 2003 as a joint effort of approximately 40 religious leaders focussing on the issue of youth violence, particularly involving gangs and guns. It received charitable status from the Canada Revenue Agency in 2009.

The Alliance has formed its activities on the work of Reverend Eugene Rivers of Boston who has utilized a corps of pastors. These pastors have worked to create alternatives to street gangs for disadvantaged Black youths. The Alliance brought Rivers to Toronto in early 2006 to meet with police and community leaders in an attempt to replicate the "Boston Miracle" in Toronto. As a result, the Alliance launched a program to recruit 400 mentors who would lead 70 youth oriented after-school programs in churches across the city in an attempt to divert at-risk youth from gangs and crime.
