= Un Ange =

2018 Belgian film

Un ange
- Film poster
- Directed by: Koen Mortier
- Written by: Koen Mortier
- Produced by: Eurydice Gysel; Koen Mortier
- Starring: Vincent Rottiers
- Cinematography: Nicolas Karakatsanis
- Edited by: Nico Leunen
- Production companies: CZAR Film & TV; Anonymes Films; Graniet Film
- Release date: 10 September 2018 (TIFF)
- Running time: 105 minutes
- Country: Belgium
- Language: French

Un ange ('Angel') is a 2018 Belgian drama film written and directed by Koen Mortier, and stars Vincent Rottiers and Fatou N'Diaye. It was screened in the Contemporary World Cinema section at the 2018 Toronto International Film Festival. The movie was based on the fictional novel, Monologue of Someone Who Got Used to Talking to Herself, by Flemish writer Dimitri Verhulst. In January 2019, it was nominated for the Magritte Award for Best Flemish Film.

== Plot ==
The film follows the encounter between Fae, a prostitute, and Thierry, a Belgian disgraced star bicycle racer. During his holiday in Senegal, where Thierry has taken some time off after a racing mishap, he meets Fae and it is love at first sight. They find dignity and hope in each other as they strive to overcome their troubles. But more important than these mutual desires, they find love.

== Cast ==
- Vincent Rottiers as Thierry
- Paul Bartel as Serge
- Fatou N'Diaye as Fae
- Aïcha Cissé as Binta
