= Vincent Rottiers =

French actor (born 1986)

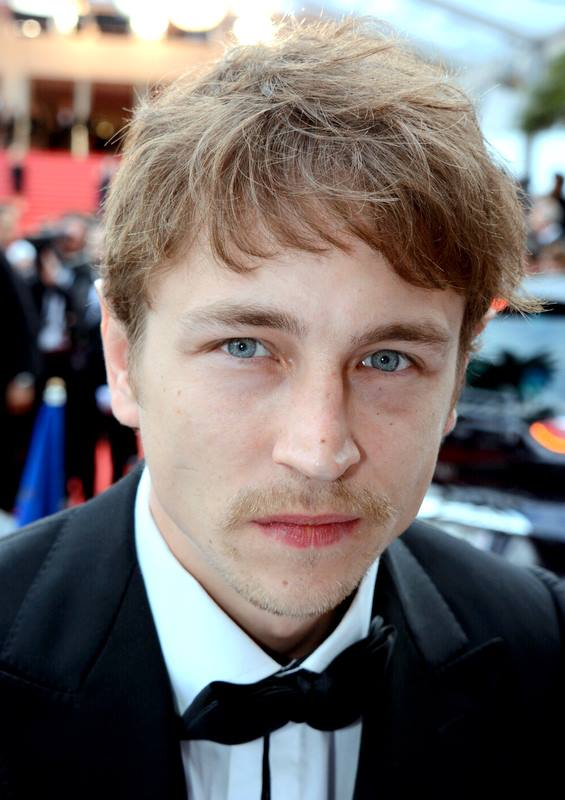
- Rottiers at the 2015 Cannes Film Festival.
- Born: 17 June 1986 (age 39); Évry, Essonne, France
- Occupation: Actor
- Years active: 2002–present

Vincent Rottiers (born 17 June 1986) is a French actor. He has appeared in more than thirty films since 2002.

He is the older brother of actor Kévin Azaïs.

== Filmography ==
| Year | Title | Role | Notes |
|---|---|---|---|
| 2002 | Les Diables | Joseph | |
| 2004 | La classe du brevet | Rémi | TV movie |
| 2004 | Narco | Kevin | |
| 2004 | My Angel | Billy | |
| 2005 | Mille soleils | Yann | short |
| 2005 | Nina's House | Gabriel | |
| 2005 | The Passenger | Lucas | Nominated—César Award for Most Promising Actor |
| 2006 | Les deux viens de serpent | Pierre | |
| 2006 | Novice | Enzo | short |
| 2007 | Treasured Island | Jim Hawkins | |
| 2007 | L'affaire Sacha Guitry | Jean | TV movie |
| 2007 | Intimate Enemies | Lefranc | |
| 2008 | 664 km | David | short |
| 2008 | Female Agents | Eddy | |
| 2009 | Instinctif | Jérôme | short |
| 2009 | In the Beginning | Nicolas | |
| 2009 | Silent Voice | Alexandre | Cabourg Film Festival Award for Male Revelation |
| 2009 | I'm Glad My Mother Is Alive | Thomas Jouvet | Nominated—César Award for Most Promising Actor |
| 2010 | Gardiens de l'ordre | Jean - le fils de député | |
| 2010 | Histoires de viens | Yann Rousseau | TV series |
| 2011 | The Night Clerk | Frédéric Boissier | |
| 2011 | Love and Bruises | Eric | |
| 2011 | Last Winter | Johann | |
| 2011 | Dans la tourmente | Le gardien au berger allemand | |
| 2011 | On the Touchline | Unknown | short |
| 2012 | Renoir | Jean Renoir | |
| 2012 | Chroniques d'une cour de récré | Moustache | |
| 2012 | Le monde nous appartient | Arnaud | |
| 2012 | L'homme à la cervelle d'or | Stanley | short |
| 2013 | Mood Indigo | Le religieux | |
| 2013 | The Marchers | Sylvain | |
| 2014 | Bodybuilder | Antoine Morel | |
| 2015 | Valentin Valentin | Valentin Fontaine | |
| 2015 | Dheepan | Brahim | Nominated—César Award for Best Supporting Actor |
| 2016 | Nocturama | Greg | |
| 2017 | The Faithful Son | Ben | |
| 2017 | Endangered Species | Tomasz | |
| 2018 | Angel | | |
| 2019 | Pompei | Toxou | |
| 2019 | Sympathy for the Devil (Sympathie pour le diable) | Vincent | |
