= Hiro Kanagawa =

Canadian actor

- 金川 弘敦
- Born: Hironobu Kanagawa; October 13, 1963 (age 62); Sapporo, Hokkaido, Japan
- Education: Middlebury College (BA); Simon Fraser University (MA)
- Occupations: Actor; playwright; screenwriter
- Years active: 1979–present

Japanese name
- Kanji: 金川 弘敦
Transcriptions
- Romanization: Kanagawa Hironobu
- Website: www.hirokanagawa.com

Hironobu Kanagawa (金川 弘敦, Kanagawa Hironobu; born October 13, 1963) is a Canadian actor and playwright based in Vancouver, British Columbia.

He has appeared in numerous high-profile films and television series shot in the Vancouver area, including The X-Files, Smallville, Caprica, Godzilla, The Man in the High Castle, Altered Carbon, iZombie, Legends of Tomorrow, Heroes Reborn, Kim's Convenience, and Shōgun, and was a writer on Da Vinci's City Hall. As a voice-over artist, he was the original English-language voice of Gihren Zabi in the Mobile Suit Gundam franchise and played Reed Richards in Fantastic Four: World's Greatest Heroes.

Kanagawa's play Indian Arm won the 2015 Jessie Richardson Theatre Award and the 2017 Governor General's Literary Award for English-language Drama. He is also a four-time Leo Award nominee.

== Early life and education ==
Kanagawa was born in Sapporo, Hokkaido, Japan and grew up in Guelph, Ontario, Sterling Heights, Michigan, and Tokyo. He graduated from International Christian University High School. Prior to his acting career, he worked in Tokyo as a sculptor and rock musician.

Kanagawa conducted his undergraduate studies in sculpting at Middlebury College, where he graduated in 1986. He also attended Skowhegan School of Painting and Sculpture. After dropping out of his initial graduate program, he re-enrolled at Simon Fraser University, where he completed his first play and completed his MFA in 1994.

== Career ==
Kanagawa played Principal Kwan in the television series Smallville. He also voiced Gihren Zabi from Mobile Suit Gundam. He was also the voice of Mister Fantastic on Fantastic Four: World's Greatest Heroes. Kanagawa has the distinction of having played three different characters in the television series The X-Files, appearing independently in seasons 2, 4, and 10. From 2015 to 2016, he played Yakuza boss Tashi in the alternate history series The Man in the High Castle.

Besides acting, Kanagawa is also a playwright and screenwriter and teaches creative writing in the English department at Capilano University. He is an Associate Member of the Playwrights' Theatre Centre.

In 2015, he won the Jessie Richardson Theatre Award for Outstanding Script for his play Indian Arm, an adaptation of Henrik Ibsen's Little Eyolf. In 2017, Indian Arm won the Governor General's Award for English-language drama.

== Personal life ==
Kanagawa has lived in British Columbia since 1990. He resides in Port Moody, British Columbia, with his wife, artist Tasha Faye Evans. They have two children together.

== Filmography ==
=== Film ===
Year	Title	Role	Notes
1993	Born Too Soon	Resident	
1994	My Name is Kate	Doctor	
1994	Voices from Within	Medical Examiner	
1995	A Child Is Missing	Agent Kurosaka	
1995	Cyberjack	Kenji	
1997	Bliss	Emergency Doctor	
1997	Excess Baggage	Jon	
1998	Futuresport	Otomo Akira	
1999	Turbulence 2: Fear of Flying	Controller	
1999	Resurrection	Tech #2	
2000	The Guilty	Police Detective	
2000	Protection	Don	
2000	Best in Show	Pet Shop Owner	
2001	Josie and the Pussycats	Japanese Delegate	
2005	Hiro	Hiro	
2005	Best Friends	Detective Miyashiro	
2005	Elektra	Meizumi	
2006	Family in Hiding	Kanagawa	
2007	War	Yoshido	
2008	The Day the Earth Stood Still	Dr. Ikegawa	
2008	Sword of the Stranger	Shoan	Voice; English-language dub
2009	Hardwired	Dr. Steckler	
2009	Girlfriend Experience	John	
2010	The King of Fighters	Saisyu Kusanagi	
2011	Doomsday Prophecy	Dr. Yates	
2011	Earth's Final Hours	Tech	
2013	Down River	Aki's Father	
2013	Grave Halloween	Jin	
2014	Godzilla	Hayato	
2015	The Age of Adaline	Kenneth	
2018	Fifty Shades Freed	Detective Clark	
2019	Midway	Commander Isamu Fujita	
2020	Deeper I Go		Short film
2021	Crisis	Dr. Ishiyama	
2021	iDorothy	Sal	Short film
2021	Hiro and the Emerald Lady	Hiro	Short film
2021	Needle in a Timestack	Tattersal	
2021	Every Breath You Take	Dr. Toth	
2022	Orphan: First Kill	Detective Donnan	
2025	Akashi	Cab Driver	
2025	Playdate	Colonel Kurtz	

=== Television ===
Year	Title	Role	Notes
1994	Madison	Teacher	
1994	Highlander: The Series	Akira Yoshida	Episode: "The Samurai"
1994	M.A.N.T.I.S.	Yakuza Translator	
1994, 1997, 2016	The X-Files	Dr. Yonechi, Peter Tanaka, Garner	3 episodes
1998, 2000	The Outer Limits	Ron Hikida / Tali	2 episodes
1996	Sliders	Henry	Episode: "Obsession"
1998	Cold Squad		
1998	The Inspectors	Polygraph Tech	Television film
1999	The Net	Frank	Episode: "Y2K – Total System Failure"
2000	Seven Days	Mr. Kim / Dr. Oshima	2 episodes
2000	Dark Angel	Theo	Episode: "Pilot"
2000	The Linda McCartney Story	Senior Narcotics Officer	Television film
2001–02	Smallville	Principal James Kwan	5 episodes
2002	Damaged Care	Dr. Kitano	
2002	Living with the Dead	Frank the Business Consultant	
2003	Betrayed	Dr. Tanaka	Television film
2005	The 4400	Agent Park	2 episodes
2005	Criminal Minds	Seattle ASAC	Episode: "Extreme Aggressor"
2005	Steklo	Akira	
2005	Andromeda	Burma	2 episodes
2005	Stargate SG-1	Mr Wayne	Episode: "Full Alert"
2005	Da Vinci's City Hall	Fire Captain Roy Komori	9 episodes
2006	Blade: The Series	Taka	Episode: "The Sacrifice"
2007	Intelligence	Detective Ogawa	7 episodes
2008	Heroes and Villains	Mitsunari Ishida	Episode: "Shogun"
2008	What Color Is Love?	Henry Wong	Episode:
2008	The Story of Saiunkoku	Kaku	Episode: "It's the Company That Makes Travel Unpleasant"
2009	Supernatural	Game Show Host	Episode: "Changing Channels"
2009	Reaper	Morris	3 episodes
2009	Sanctuary	Ark-Fong Li	Episode: "Eulogy"
2010	Caprica	Cyrus Xander	13 episodes
2010	Human Target	Lt. Peale	Episode: "Pilot"
2010	Fringe	Lawyer	Episode: "The Box"
2011–12	The Secret Circle	Calvin Wilson	2 episodes
2012	Continuum	Dr. Ted Gibson	1 episode
2012–14	Blackstone	Harold	4 episodes
2013	The Tomorrow People	Corbin	Episode: "All Tomorrow's Parties"
2013	Bates Motel	Dr. Kurata	2 episodes
2013–14	Almost Human	Recollectionist	3 episodes
2014	The 100	Council Member #3	3 episodes
2015	The Returned	Dr. Hiromoto	3 episodes
2015	The Magicians	Professor March	2 episodes
2015	The Whispers	Team Member 1 Brent	3 episodes
2015	Dark Matter	Emperor Ishida Tetsuda	2 episodes
2015–16	The Man in the High Castle	Taishi Okamura	5 episodes
2015–16	Heroes Reborn	Hachiro Otomo/Red Samurai	8 episodes
2015, 2018	iZombie	Lieutenant Suzuki	Recurring season 1; guest season 4
2016	Timeless	Agent Kondo	Episode: "Pilot"
2016	Zoo	Curtis	Episode: "The Moon and the Star"
2016	Kim's Convenience	Pastor Choi	2 episodes
2017–18	Legends of Tomorrow	Director Wilbur Bennett	4 episodes
2018	Altered Carbon	Captain Tanaka	7 episodes
2018	Salvation	Chief Justice Martin Cheng	4 episodes
2018	Designated Survivor	NASA Liaison to the President Richard Kim	Episode: "The Final Frontier"
2019	The Order	Detective Hayashi	Episode: "Hell Week, Part One"
2019	Warigami	James Ohata	6 episodes
2019	The Terror	Dr. Kitamura	2 episodes
2019	Limetown	R.B. Villard	2 episodes
2019	See	Lord Unoa	4 episodes
2020	Zoey's Extraordinary Playlist	Dr. Hamara	3 episodes
2020	Charmed	Dr. Tanaka	Episode: "Unsafe Space"
2020	Helstrom	Father Sean Okamoto	Episode: "Viaticum"
2021	Age of Samurai: Battle for Japan	Narrator (voice)	6 episodes
2021	The Good Doctor	Dr. Paul Nakano	Episode: "Letting Go"
2022	Star Trek: Discovery	Dr. Hirai	4 episodes
2022	Pachinko	Goto-San	Episode: "Chapter One"
2022–23	Upload	Sato	4 episodes
2022–23	So Help Me Todd	Alistair Song	2 episodes
2023	The Night Agent	FBI Director Willet	3 episodes
2023–24	Percy Jackson and the Olympians	Headmaster / Kronos	2 episodes
2024	Avatar: The Last Airbender	Fire Lord Sozin	Episode: "Aang"
2024	Shōgun	Igarashi Yoshitomo	3 episodes
2024	Family Law		1 episode
2025	The Last of Us	Carlisle	Episode: "The Path"

=== Voice acting ===
==== Animation ====
Year	Title	Role	Notes
2001	Mobile Suit Gundam	Gihren Zabi	English-language dub
2001	Sagwa, the Chinese Siamese Cat	The Foolish Magistrate	
2003	Master Keaton	Fumio Hisayama	English-language dub
2004	InuYasha	Saint Hakushin	English-language dub
2005	Hikaru no Go	Rinshin Li	English-language dub
2006–07	Fantastic Four: World's Greatest Heroes	Mister Fantastic	
2007	Black Lagoon	Col. Matsuto	English-language dub
2007	The Story of Saiunkoku	Kaku	English-language dub
2020	Monster Beach	Stress Leave	
2020	Dragon Quest: The Adventure of Dai	Matoriv, Sigma	English-language dub
2021	Future Boy Conan	Dr. Briac Lao	English-language dub
2022	Team Zenko Go	Mr. Tanaka	
2024	Dead Dead Demon's Dededede Destruction	Katsuaki Ognio, Tokushima	English-language dub

==== Video games ====
Year	Title	Role	Notes
2001	Mobile Suit Gundam: Zeonic Front	Gihren Zabi	English version
2001	Mobile Suit Gundam: Federation vs. Zeon	Gihren Zabi	English version
2003	Mobile Suit Gundam: Encounters in Space	Gihren Zabi	English version
2023	Infinity Strash: Dragon Quest – The Adventures of Dai	Matoriv	English version
2025	Assassin's Creed Shadows	Oda Nobunaga	English version

== Awards and nominations ==
Year	Award	Category	Nominated work	Result	Notes
2006	Leo Awards	Best Performance by a Male in a Short Drama	Hiro	Nominated	
2021	Leo Awards	Best Performance by a Male in a Short Drama	The Tailor	Nominated	
2021	Leo Awards	Best Performance by a Male in a Short Drama	Deeper I Go	Nominated	
2021	Vancouver Short Film Festival	Best Performance by a Man	Deeper I Go	Won	
2021	UBCP/ACTRA Awards	Best Supporting Performance, Male	Deeper I Go	Won	
2022	Leo Awards	Best Performance by a Male in a Short Drama	iDorothy	Nominated	
