= Matthew Swanson =

Canadian filmmaker and director

- Born: Vancouver, British Columbia, Canada
- Occupation: Filmmaker

Matthew Swanson is a Canadian filmmaker and commercial director from Vancouver, British Columbia. He is most noted for his 2005 short film Hiro, which was a Genie Award nominee for Best Live Action Short Drama at the 27th Genie Awards in 2007.

He is a graduate of the Mel Hoppenheim School of Cinema at Concordia University.

His other short films have included Tic Tac Toe (2007) and Seven Stars (2016).
