= Hiro (film) =

- Movie screenshot
- Directed by: Matthew Swanson
- Written by: Matthew Swanson
- Produced by: Oliver Lindsay
- Starring: Hiro Kanagawa; Vicky Huang
- Music by: Don MacDonald
- Distributed by: Paper Cut Films
- Release date: September 11, 2005 (TIFF)
- Running time: 20 minutes
- Country: Canada
- Languages: Japanese; English subtitles

Hiro is a Canadian short film, written and directed by Matthew Swanson and released in 2005. It centers on Hiro (Hiro Kanagawa), a shy Japanese insect collector who finds himself thrust into a wild chase to recover a stolen beetle after a chance encounter with a young girl (Vicky Huang).

The film's dialogue is in Japanese, although Swanson does not personally speak the language. Swanson described it as "liberating" to direct in a language he did not understand.

The film premiered at the 2005 Toronto International Film Festival.

== Awards ==
The film was nominated for a Genie Award for Best Live Action Short Drama at the 27th Genie Awards in 2007.

It also won the award for Best Short Film at the 2006 SXSW Film Festival, and was the first Canadian film to win the "Spirit of Slamdance" Audience Award at the Slamdance Film Festival.
