= Denis Chouinard =

Canadian film director and screenwriter

- Born: 1964 (age 61–62); Montreal, Quebec, Canada
- Occupations: Film director Screenwriter
- Years active: 1985 - present

Denis Chouinard (born 1964 in Montreal, Quebec) is a Canadian film director and screenwriter. He has a degree in Filmmaking from Cégep de Saint-Laurent and a degree in Communications from UQAM. He is a close friend and collaborator of filmmaker Louis Bélanger; both men created several short films together before branching off into their own careers with feature films. His film L'ange de goudron won best Canadian feature at the Montreal World Film Festival and earned him a nomination for the Genie Award for Best Achievement in Direction.

== Selected filmography ==
=== Feature films ===
- Stowaways (Clandestins) (Co-directed with Nicolas Wadimoff, 1997)
- Tar Angel (L'ange de goudron) (2001)
- Deliver Me (Délivrez-moi) (2006)

=== Short films and documentaries ===
- On parlait pas allemand (Documentary co-directed with Jean-Antoine Charest, 1985)
- Dogmatisme ou Le songe d'Adrien (Short film co-directed with Louis Bélanger, 1988)
- Le soleil et ses traces (Short film co-directed with Louis Bélanger, 1990)
- Les 14 définitions de la pluie (Short film co-directed with Louis Bélanger, 1993)
- Le feu (Short film, 1995)
- Parade (Documentary, 1996)
- Le verbe incendié (Documentary, 1998)
- Voir Gilles Groulx (Documentary, 2002)
