= The Toronto Rap Project =

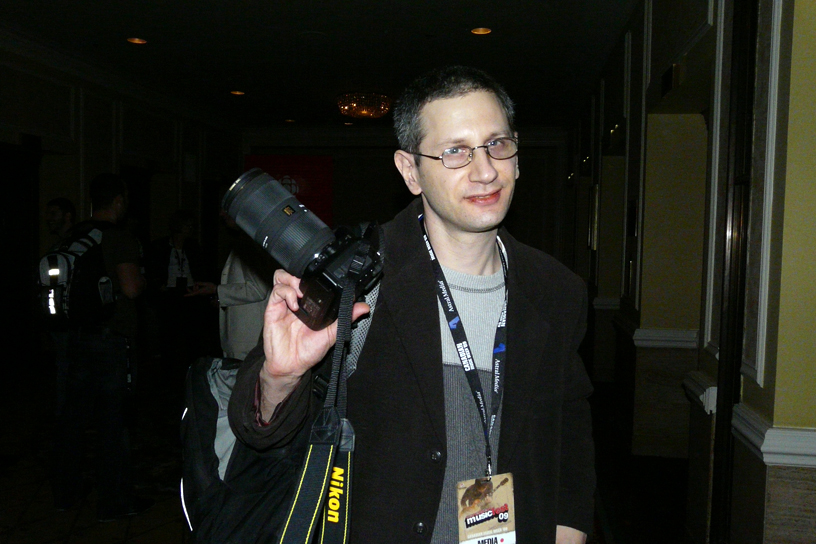
- director Richard Budman
- Directed by: Richard Budman
- Produced by: John Bortolotti
- Music by: Jeru the Damaja, Maestro Fresh Wes, Kardinal Offishall, The Dope Poet Society
- Release date: 2006
- Country: Canada

The Toronto Rap Project is a 2006 documentary directed by Richard Budman, about rap music culture and violence in Toronto, Ontario, Canada. It was produced by John Bortolotti for D.C.R. Productions and premiered April 20, 2006 at the ReelWorld Film Festival in 2006.

== Overview ==
On November 22, 2005, MP Dan McTeague asked Immigration Minister Joe Volpe to restrict rapper 50 Cent from entering Canada, citing the death of a constituent at the performer's previous concert in Toronto in 2004. 50 Cent's tour went on as scheduled but McTeague's intervention succeeded in seeing at least half of the accompanying members of the rapper's troupe, the G-Unit, banned in Canada as a result of the objections.

The documentary travels to diverse neighbourhoods including Jane-Finch, Cataraqui Park in Scarborough, and ends up at the 50 Cent concert in Toronto. It features commentary and interviews from both aspiring rappers and established music stars Kardinal Offishall and Wes “Maestro” Williams, Reverend Eugene Rivers, BBC documentary filmmaker Don Letts, journalists, politicians, and the everyday person on the streets of Toronto also weigh in on the debate.

== Soundtrack ==
The Toronto Rap Project Soundtrack was released in April, 2006, produced by John Bortolotti and distributed by D.C.R. Productions. The soundtrack featured songs inspired by and used in the documentary, including music by such prominent rap artists such as Jeru the Damaja, Maestro Fresh Wes, Kardinal Offishall and The Dope Poet Society, along with many underground rappers from areas that the documentary covered. The Canadian urban magazine Urbanology called the soundtrack "the hottest movie soundtrack since The Show", and the soundtrack was called "a remarkable soundtrack" by the Brock Press.

== Reception ==
The Toronto Rap Project won the StarTV audience choice award for best film and the best director award at the festival, while selling out both of the screenings of the film. The film was also awarded a four-star review by Now Magazine and received positive reviews in The Toronto Star and National Post. It was also a feature story on CBC News and MTV Canada.

The Toronto Rap Project also played several other film festivals, receiving rave reviews at both its Brunswick House Screening and at the 2006 Commfest Gala with Harold Stoute. The Rap Project also hosted a Jane and Finch community screening at Driftwood Community Center with Rap Project Star Blacus Ninjah.

The Toronto Rap Project was eventually distributed on-line through the Rap Project website and through social networking sites such as YouTube, Myspace, and Facebook. The success of The Toronto Rap Project led D.C.R. Productions to continue the premise of the documentary as a running on-line show, called RAPproject TV. RAPproject TV has featured interviews with such hip-hop heavyweights as Russell Simmons, Chuck D and RZA.
