= Serge Giguère =

Canadian documentary filmmaker

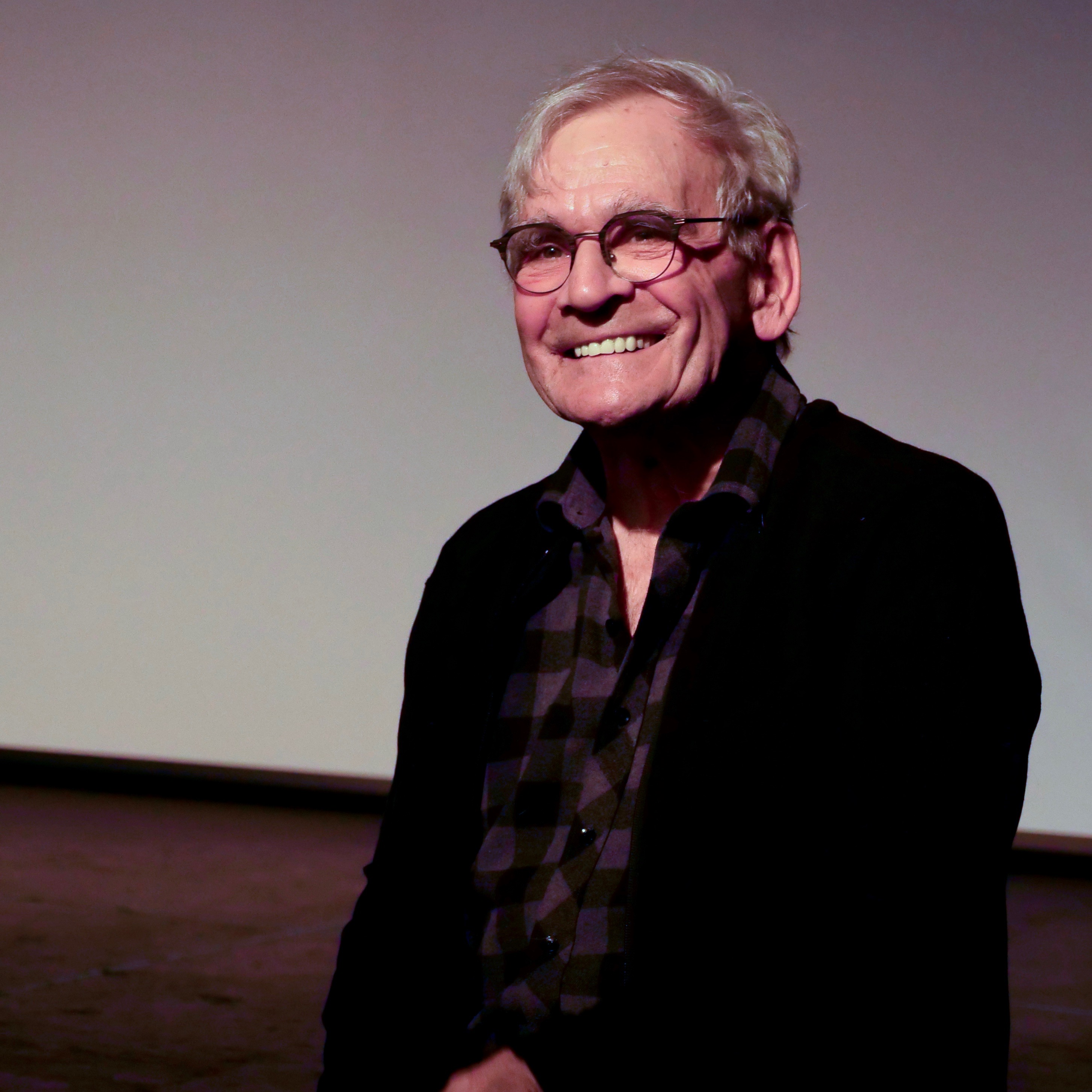
- Born: 1946 (age 79–80); Arthabaska Quebec, Canada
- Occupation: Documentary filmmaker
- Years active: 2000–present
- Known for: Driven by Dreams
- Awards: Prix Iris for Best Documentary Film (2007, 2015)

Serge Giguère (born 1946) is a Canadian documentary filmmaker. He is most noted as a two-time winner of the Prix Jutra/Iris for Best Documentary Film, winning at the 9th Jutra Awards in 2007 for Driven by Dreams (À force de rêves) and at the 17th Jutra Awards in 2015 for Finding Macpherson (Le mystère Macpherson).

He was previously nominated, but did not win, in the same category at the 2nd Jutra Awards in 2000 for The Megaphone Reel (Le Réel du mégaphone), and was a nominee for Best Sound in a Documentary at the 21st Quebec Cinema Awards in 2019 for My Mother's Letters (Les lettres de ma mère).

In addition to his own films, he has been a cinematographer on work by other filmmakers, including the films 24 heures ou plus, Thunder Drum (Mémoire battante) and Jacques and November (Jacques et novembre).

He was a recipient of the Governor General's Award in Visual and Media Arts in 2008. In 2021, he was the recipient of the Prix Albert-Tessier from the Prix du Québec.

His newest film, Maurice, premiered at the 2025 Rendez-vous Québec Cinéma.

He was previously married to producer Sylvie Van Brabant, who remains a frequent collaborator as producer of many of Giguère's films despite the end of their marriage. Their daughter, Katerine Giguère, works as a cinematographer.
