= The White Planet =

The White Planet (La Planète Blanche)
- Directed by: Jean Lemire; Thierry Ragobert; Thierry Piantanida
- Edited by: Catherine Mabilat; Nadine Verdier; Thierry Ragobert
- Production companies: Gedeon Programmes; BAC Films; France 2 Cinéma; Glacialis Productions; National Film Board of Canada
- Release date: 2006
- Running time: 80 minutes
- Country: Canada
- Language: French

The White Planet or in French, La Planète Blanche, is a 2006 documentary about the wildlife of the Arctic.

It shows interactions between marine animals, birds and land animals, especially the polar bear, over a one-year period. The fragility of the Arctic is hinted at as a reason to prevent climate change. It was nominated for the Documentary category in the 27th Genie Awards in 2007.
