= Juliette Gosselin =

Canadian actress (born 1991)

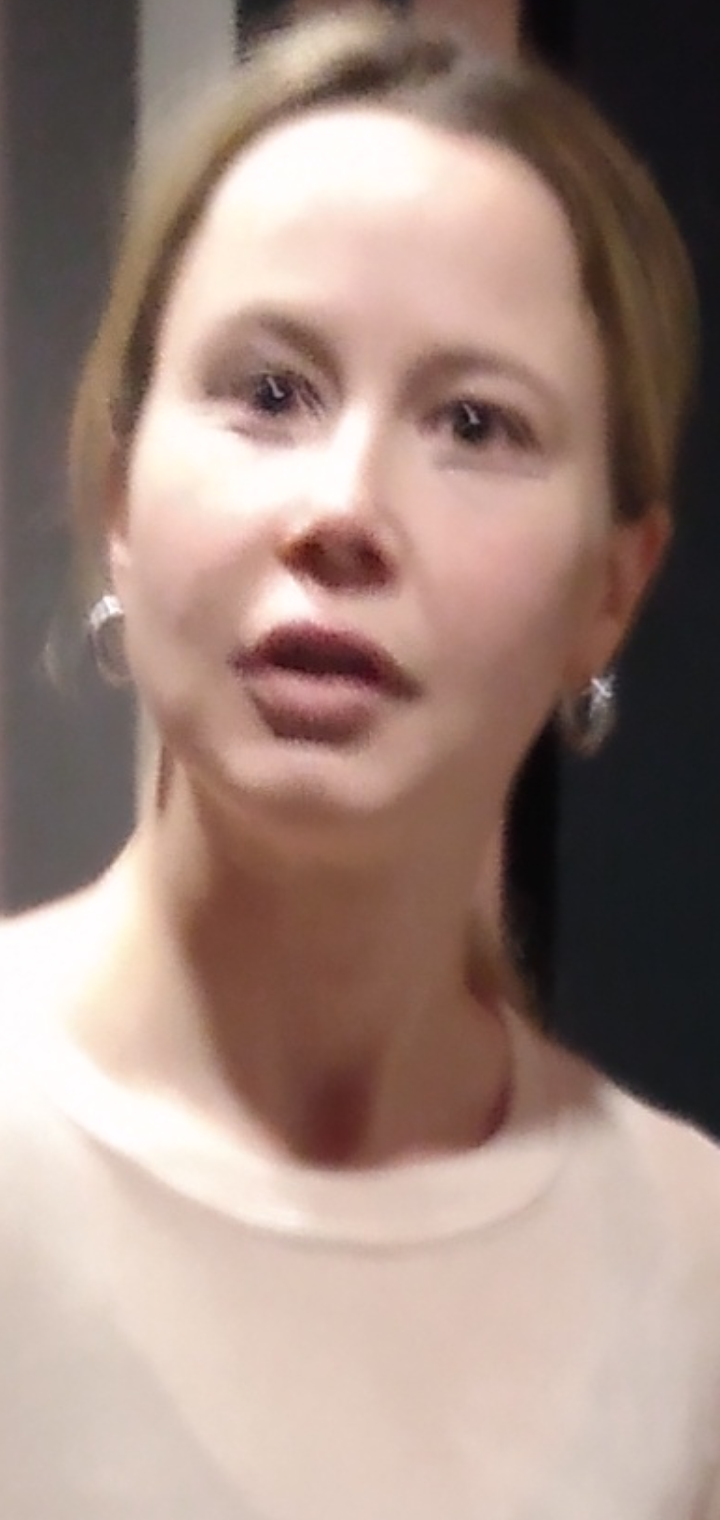
- Born: June 15, 1991 (age 35); Beaconsfield, Quebec, Canada
- Occupation: Actress
- Years active: 2004–present

Juliette Gosselin (born June 15, 1991) is a Canadian actress.

== Career ==
She made her film debut in the 2004 film Battle of the Brave. In 2005, at the 25th Genie Awards, she was nominated for the Genie Award for Best Performance by an Actress in a Supporting Role for her role in this film.

Gosselin has played characters in films of various genres, including the drama films Familia (2005), You're Sleeping Nicole (2014), Kiss Me Like a Lover (2016) and Boost (2017), the horror films Martyrs (2008), The Gracefield Incident (2017) and the thriller films The Fall of the American Empire (2018) and The Hummingbird Project (2018).

In 2016 and 2017, she played the role of Martine in the crime drama television series 19-2.

She also played the character of young Yeesha in the 2004 video game Myst IV: Revelation.

== Filmography ==
- 2004: Battle of the Brave (Nouvelle-France), Young France Carignan
- 2005: Familia, Gabrielle
- 2006: Family History (Histoire de famille), Monique Gagné, age 12
- 2006: Deliver Me (Délivrez-moi), Sophie
- 2008: Martyrs, Marie
- 2011: La vérité, Lydia
- 2014: You're Sleeping Nicole (Tu dors Nicole), Maude Cloutier
- 2015: Switch & Bitch, Fanny
- 2015: Darwin, Dara
- 2016: Kiss Me Like a Lover (Embrasse-moi comme tu m'aimes), Berthe Sauvageau
- 2017: Boost, Anna
- 2017: Tadoussac, Laurie
- 2017: The Gracefield Incident, Julia Gilbert
- 2018: 1991, Marie-Ève Bernard
- 2018: The Fall of the American Empire, Resident female doctor
- 2018: The Hummingbird Project, Young Amish Woman
- 2019: Forgotten Flowers (Les fleurs oubliées), Lili de la Rosbil
- 2019: Fabulous (Fabuleuses), Clara Diamond
- 2021: Virage, Fanny
- 2025: The Furies (Les Furies), Roxanne
