= The Genius of Crime =

- French: Le Génie du crime
- Directed by: Louis Bélanger
- Written by: Thérèse Bérubé
- Based on: Criminal Genius by George F. Walker
- Produced by: André Gagnon; Colette Loumède
- Starring: Gilles Renaud; Patrick Drolet; Julie Le Breton; Anne-Marie Cadieux
- Cinematography: Jean-Pierre St-Louis
- Edited by: Claude Palardy
- Music by: Michel Cusson
- Production company: Lycaon Pictus
- Distributed by: K Films Amérique
- Release date: October 28, 2006 (FCIAT)
- Running time: 84 minutes
- Country: Canada
- Language: French

The Genius of Crime (French: Le Génie du crime) is a 2006 Canadian comedy-drama film directed by Louis Bélanger and written by Thérèse Bérubé. An adaptation of George F. Walker's stage play Criminal Genius, the film stars Gilles Renaud as Rolly and Patrick Drolet as Stevie, two criminal hoodlums who are hired by Shirley (Anne-Marie Cadieux) to burn down the restaurant of her rival Mike (Robert Morin), only to instead end up kidnapping Amanda (Julie Le Breton), the restaurant's chef and Mike's daughter.

The film's cast also includes François Papineau as Phillie, the manager of the motel where they are hiding out.

The film premiered at the Abitibi-Témiscamingue International Film Festival on October 28, 2006.

The film received two Jutra Award nominations at the 9th Jutra Awards in 2007, for Best Costume Design (Anne Duceppe) and Best Hair (Martin Rivest).
