= Fatou N'Diaye (actress) =

Senegalese actress

- Born: 1980 (age 45–46); Saint-Louis du Sénégal
- Occupation: actress
- Notable work: Asterix & Obelix: Mission Cleopatra

Fatou N'Diaye is an actress, originally from Senegal, born 1980 in Saint-Louis du Sénégal.

== Biography ==
At 8 years old, she left Senegal with her mother, and moved to Paris.

In 1997, aged 16/17, she was discovered by Oliviero Toscani, commercial photographer for the Benetton brand, which, subsequently, led to modelling assignments.

Fatou learned Guinea-Bissau Creole for her leading role as Vita in the 2002 film Nha fala.

== Filmography ==
- 2001: Fatou la Malienne TV film by Daniel Vigne: Fatou
- 2002: Asterix & Obelix: Mission Cleopatra by Alain Chabat: Exlibris
- 2002: Angelina (TV): Angelina
- 2002: Nha fala (My Voice) by Flora Gomes: Vita
- 2003: Spirit of the Mask (TV series episode Aventure et associés): Celia
- 2003: Fatou, l'espoir (TV): Fatou
- 2004: Une autre vie (TV): Djenaba
- 2004: Souli: Abi
- 2006: Un dimanche à Kigali by Robert Favreau: Gentille
- 2006: Guet-apens (TV series episode Alex Santana, négociateur): Julia
- 2006 - Tropique amers
- 2006: The Front Line by David Gleeson: Kala
- 2007: Tropiques amers (TV series): Adèle
- 2008: Aide-toi, le ciel t'aidera by François Dupeyron: Liz
- 2008: Marianne (TV) by Philippe Guez from the series Scénarios contre les discriminations: Marianne
- 2010: Victor Sauvage (TV) by Patrick Grandperret
- 2010: Merci papa, merci maman (TV) by Vincent Giovanni: Audrey
- 2011: Passage du désir (TV) by Jérôme Foulon: Ingrid Diesel
- 2014: Engrenages (TV): Carole Mendy
- 2018: Angel
- 2019: Scappo a casa
- 2021: OSS 117: Alerte Rouge en Afrique Noire
