= Deliver Me (film) =

- French: Délivrez-moi
- Directed by: Denis Chouinard
- Written by: Denis Chouinard; Monique Proulx
- Produced by: Réal Chabot
- Starring: Céline Bonnier; Juliette Gosselin; Geneviève Bujold
- Cinematography: Steve Asselin
- Edited by: Michel Arcand
- Music by: Claude Fradette
- Production companies: Coop Vidéo de Montréal; Les Productions 23 Inc.
- Release date: May 12, 2006
- Running time: 100 minutes
- Country: Canada
- Language: French

Deliver Me (French: Délivrez-moi) is a Canadian drama film, directed by Denis Chouinard and released in 2006. The film stars Céline Bonnier as Annie, a woman who has just been released from prison after serving a 10-year sentence for killing her former partner, and is attempting to make amends and reconcile with her daughter Sophie (Juliette Gosselin) over the objections of Irène (Geneviève Bujold), Sophie's paternal grandmother who has been raising the girl since her son's death.

The cast also includes Patrice Robitaille, Pierre-Luc Brillant, Gregory Hlady, Danielle Fichaud, Pierre Collin and Sandrine Bisson.

In preparation for the film, Chouinard and Bonnier met with a woman who had been incarcerated at the Joliette Institution for Women for murdering her husband. Chouinard cowrote the screenplay with novelist Monique Proulx.

Bonnier won the Prix Jutra for Best Actress at the 9th Jutra Awards in 2007. Bonnier also won the award for Best Actress, and Chouinard and Proulx won for Best Screenplay, at the 2007 Brussels Independent Film Festival.

== Cast ==
- Celine Bonnier as Annie
- Genevieve Bujold as Irene
- Juliette Gosselin as Sophie
- Patrice Robitaille as Ghislain
- Pierre-Luc Brillant as Marco
- Danielle Fichaud as Martine
- Gregory Hlady as Milan
- Pierre Collin as Monsieur Dery
- Nicole Leblanc as Madame Bissonnette
- Lise Roy as Madame La Juga
- Zoran Krzisnik as Miklav
