= The Days (2006 film) =

2006 Canadian film directed by Maxime Giroux

- French: Les Jours
- Directed by: Maxime Giroux
- Written by: Maxime Giroux; Alexandre Laferrière
- Produced by: Paul Barbeau; Maxime Giroux
- Starring: Gildor Roy
- Cinematography: Sara Mishara
- Edited by: Mathieu Bouchard-Malo
- Production company: NuFilms
- Release date: September 2006
- Running time: 26 minutes
- Country: Canada
- Language: French

The Days (French: Les Jours) is a Canadian short drama film, directed by Maxime Giroux and released in 2006. The film stars Gildor Roy as a grieving father going through a rapid cycle of emotions after his daughter is found dead in the forest.

The film's cast also includes Martin Dubreuil, Denise Charest and Clément Sasseville.

The film premiered at the 2006 Toronto International Film Festival, where it won the award for Best Canadian Short Film. It was subsequently a Jutra Award nominee for Best Live Action Short Film at the 9th Jutra Awards in 2007.
