= Yves Bélanger (cinematographer) =

Canadian cinematographer

- Born: July 7, 1960 (age 66); Saint-Jean-d'Iberville, Quebec, Canada
- Education: Concordia University
- Occupation: Cinematographer
- Years active: 1989–present

Yves Bélanger (born July 7, 1960) is a Canadian cinematographer. He has worked on films by directors such as Alain DesRochers, Xavier Dolan and Clint Eastwood, and he was a frequent collaborator of Jean-Marc Vallée. In 2016, he received a Canadian Screen Award for Best Cinematography for his work in Brooklyn.

== Life and career ==
Bélanger grew up in Sainte-Foy, Quebec. He first became interested in film at eight years old when his father showed him 2001: A Space Odyssey, and he began making short films when he was 13. He studied film at Concordia University, where he contemplated becoming a director or cinematographer, ultimately deciding on the latter. He graduated with a BFA in 1984.

Bélanger began working as a cinematographer in 1989, working initially on music videos before moving to advertising. He started working on films and television series in 1995, alongside directors including Alain DesRochers, Jean-Claude Lord and Alan Metter. He first became recognized in 2001 with the short film Killing Time, for which he received a Canadian Society of Cinematographers award nomination. He worked on another short film, Wildflowers, which won a CSC award in 2003, and he received a third nomination for the 2006 film Cheech. He filmed Laurence Anyways (2012) with the arthouse director Xavier Dolan. Bélanger later said about Dolan's style, "it's not my cup of tea. It's very colorful, very crazy ... I'm more like a naturalist." His work on Laurence Anyways garnered a Camerimage award nomination.

After finishing Laurence Anyways, Bélanger was contacted by director Jean-Marc Vallée, who asked him to work on his upcoming film Dallas Buyers Club (2013). Bélanger and Vallée had known each other for around 20 years but had never worked together before. Dallas Buyers Club marked Bélanger's breakout in the mainstream film industry; he was 53 years old at the time and two decades into his career. A year later, he and Vallée collaborated a second time, on Wild (2014). The film, which is about a woman who hikes the Pacific Crest Trail, was filmed on a small budget with a minimal crew and mostly handheld camerawork. His cinematography on Wild received a Camerimage nomination.

Bélanger then shot the period drama film Brooklyn (2015), directed by John Crowley. He became involved after Bruna Papandrea, one of the producers of Wild, introduced Bélanger to Crowley. For Brooklyn, he received a Canadian Screen Award for Best Cinematography. His third collaboration with Vallée was Demolition, released in 2016, and their fourth was the HBO miniseries Big Little Lies (2017).

== Filmography ==
=== Film ===
Key
†	Denotes films that have not yet been released

Year	Title	Director	Notes
1989	Justine's Film (Le film de Justine)	Jeanne Crépeau	
1991	Letters of Transit (Les Sauf-conduits)	Manon Briand	
1997	The Caretaker's Lodge (La Conciergerie)	Michel Poulette	
2000	The Bottle (La Bouteille)	Alain DesRochers	
2006	Cheech	Patrice Sauvé	
2007	My Daughter, My Angel (Ma fille, mon ange)	Alexis Durand-Brault	
2010	The Comeback (Cabotins)	Alain DesRochers	
2011	Gerry	Alain DesRochers	
2011	Thrill of the Hills (Frisson des collines)	Richard Roy	
2012	Laurence Anyways	Xavier Dolan	
2013	Dallas Buyers Club	Jean-Marc Vallée	
2014	Wild	Jean-Marc Vallée	
2014	The Little Queen (La Petite Reine)	Alexis Durand-Brault	
2015	Brooklyn	John Crowley	Nominated – San Diego Film Critics Society Award for Best Cinematography; Nominated – Washington D.C. Area Film Critics Association Award for Best Cinematography
2015	Demolition	Jean-Marc Vallée	
2016	Shut In	Farren Blackburn	
2016	9 (9, le film)	Marc Labrèche	Segment "Le lecteur"
2017	Indian Horse	Stephen Campanelli	
2018	The Mule	Clint Eastwood	
2019	Long Shot	Jonathan Levine	
2019	Richard Jewell	Clint Eastwood	
2019	Thanks for Everything (Merci pour tout)	Louise Archambault	
2023	My Mother's Wedding	Kristin Scott Thomas	
2024	Sisters and Neighbors! (Nos belles-sœurs)	René Richard Cyr	
2024	Juror No. 2	Clint Eastwood	
2025	We'll Find Happiness (On sera heureux)	Léa Pool	
2026	Closing Night	Cody Fern	

=== Television ===
- 2017 - Big Little Lies - 7 episodes
- 2018 - Sharp Objects - 7 episodes
- 2021 - Nine Perfect Strangers - 8 episodes
