= Driven by Dreams =

2006 Canadian documentary film

- French: À force de rêves
- Directed by: Serge Giguère
- Written by: Serge Giguère
- Produced by: Nicole Hubert; Sylvie Van Brabant
- Cinematography: Serge Giguère
- Edited by: Louise Tougas
- Music by: René Lussier
- Production companies: Production du Rapide Blanc; National Film Board of Canada
- Release date: November 9, 2006 (RIDM)
- Running time: 83 minutes
- Country: Canada
- Language: French

Driven by Dreams (French: À force de rêves) is a Canadian documentary film, directed by Serge Giguère and released in 2006. The film profiles five senior citizens who are still driven by the passion to pursue hobbies and aspirations, including painting, singing and flying miniature airplanes.

The film premiered on November 9, 2006, at the Montreal International Documentary Festival. It was later screened at the 2007 Hot Docs Canadian International Documentary Festival, where it received a Special Jury Prize from the Best Canadian Feature Documentary jury.

The film won the Jutra Award for Best Documentary Film at the 9th Jutra Awards in 2007.
