= Regarding Sarah =

2006 Canadian short film

- Directed by: Michelle Porter
- Written by: Michelle Porter
- Produced by: Amy Belling
- Starring: Gina Stockdale; Joy Coghill; Tom McBeath
- Cinematography: Shannon Kohli
- Edited by: Lauren Mainland
- Production company: Compact Films
- Release date: August 24, 2006 (MWFF)
- Running time: 14 minutes
- Country: Canada
- Language: English

Regarding Sarah is a Canadian short drama film, directed by Michelle Porter and released in 2006. The film stars Gina Stockdale as Sarah, an elderly woman in the early stages of dementia who begins obsessively filming her daily life so that she will not forget it.

The cast also includes Joy Coghill, Stephen E. Miller and Tom McBeath.

The film was inspired in part by Porter's father's own failing health in his final years of life. It was shot in 2005, and premiered at the Montreal World Film Festival in 2006.

The film received a Genie Award nomination for Best Live Action Short Drama at the 28th Genie Awards in 2008. It was subsequently broadcast by CBC Television on the Canadian Reflections series in 2008.
