= Here and There (2006 film) =

- French: Ici par ici
- Directed by: Diane Obomsawin
- Written by: Diane Obomsawin
- Produced by: Marc Bertrand
- Narrated by: Diane Obomsawin
- Edited by: Natacha Dufaux
- Music by: Jean Derome
- Animation by: Diane Obomsawin
- Production company: National Film Board of Canada
- Release date: 2006
- Running time: 9 minutes
- Country: Canada

Here and There (French: Ici par ici) is a Canadian animated short film, directed by Diane Obomsawin and released in 2006. The film is a portrait of Obomsawin's own childhood experiences growing up in both Canada and France.

The film was a Genie Award nominee for Best Animated Short at the 28th Genie Awards, and a Jutra Award nominee for Best Animated Short at the 9th Jutra Awards.
