= Snapshots for Henry =

2006 Canadian short film

- Directed by: Teresa Hannigan
- Written by: Teresa Hannigan
- Based on: "Scarlet Runners" by Collette Yvonne
- Produced by: Charlotte Disher
- Starring: Molly Atkinson; Allan Hawco; Zoie Palmer; Dan Petronijevic
- Cinematography: Paul Van der Linden
- Edited by: Teresa Hannigan
- Music by: Ron Sures
- Production company: Lone Cone Films
- Release date: April 29, 2006 (WorldFest Houston)
- Running time: 16 minutes
- Country: Canada
- Language: English

Snapshots for Henry is a Canadian short drama film, directed by Teresa Hannigan and released in 2006. Based on the short story "Scarlet Runners" by Collette Yvonne, the film centres on a conflict between two couples who live next door to each other in the two halves of a duplex: Pent (Allan Hawco) and Angie (Zoie Palmer), a couple who live a wild party lifestyle, and Tim (Dan Petronijevic) and Joanne (Molly Atkinson), a more straight-laced professional couple with a new baby.

Prior to its production, the film's screenplay won the Screenplay Giveaway Prize at the 2004 CFC Worldwide Short Film Festival.

The film premiered at WorldFest Houston in April 2006, and was later screened at CFC Worldwide, the Female Eye Film Festival, and the 2006 Vancouver International Film Festival.

The film received a Genie Award nomination for Best Live Action Short Drama at the 27th Genie Awards in 2007.
