= Family History (2006 film) =

2006 film

- French: Histoire de famille
- Directed by: Michel Poulette
- Written by: Normand Canac-Marquis; Guy Fournier; Alain Wieder
- Produced by: Louis Laverdière
- Starring: Luc Proulx; Danielle Proulx
- Cinematography: Serge Desrosiers
- Edited by: Denis Papillon
- Music by: Jean-Marie Benoît
- Production company: Cité-Amérique
- Distributed by: Christal Films
- Release date: January 27, 2006
- Running time: 165 minutes
- Country: Canada
- Language: French

Family History (French: Histoire de famille) is a Canadian comedy-drama film, directed by Michel Poulette and released in 2006. The film is a family drama, tracing the complex story of the Gagné family through a period of change both in their family and in the wider society of Quebec, from the dawn of the Quiet Revolution in 1960 through to the election of the Parti Québécois in the 1976 Quebec general election; the events are wrapped in a frame story in which Julie Gagné (Maxim Roy) finds and reads a book that seems strangely close to her own family history, and attempts to track down its author Jean Calixa (Serge Theriault).

The cast includes Luc Proulx and Danielle Proulx as Robert and May Gagné, Juliette Gosselin as their daughter Monique in her pre-teen years, Évelyne Rompré as Monique when she reaches young adulthood, Louis-Philippe Dandenault as their son Pierre Gagné, Sébastien Huberdeau as their son Michel, Catherine Allard as their daughter Isabelle, and Catherine Trudeau as Pierre's wife Manon.

Poulette indicated that his original concept had been to make a dramatic television series dramatizing Quebec history throughout the entire period from World War II to the 21st century, although he was later convinced to narrow his focus to the Quiet Revolution era. The film was still envisioned as the first half of a five-hour miniseries to air on Télé-Québec.

The film opened in theatres on January 27, 2006.

The film received three Jutra Award nominations at the 9th Jutra Awards in 2007, for Best Actress (Danielle Proulx), Best Editing (Denis Papillon) and Best Sound (Normand Mercier, Michel B. Bordeleau, Geoffrey Mitchell).
