= Romeo and Juliet (2006 film) =

2006 film by Yves Desgagnés

- French: Roméo et Juliette
- Directed by: Yves Desgagnés
- Starring: Thomas Lalonde; Charlotte Aubin; Jeanne Moreau
- Release date: 2006
- Country: Canada
- Language: French

Romeo and Juliet (French: Roméo et Juliette) is a 2006 Canadian film made in Quebec, directed by Yves Desgagnés. It stars Thomas Lalonde as Roméo, Charlotte Aubin as Juliette, and Jeanne Moreau as Laurence. The movie has altered and modernized the Shakespeare play except for the last line.

== Cast ==
- Jeanne Moreau as Laurence
- Thomas Lalonde as Roméo Lamontagne
- Charlotte Aubin as Juliette Véronneau
- Pierre Curzi as Paul Véronneau
- Gilles Renaud as Réal Rex Lamontagne
- Danny Gagné as Étienne Véronneau
- Hubert Lemire as François Paré
- Patrice Bélanger as Benoît
- David Michael as Louki
- Maude Guérin as Natacha Lamontagne
- Liliana Komorowska as Mère de Juliette

== Production ==
Charlotte Aubin was 14 at the time of the auditions and she had never kissed a boy. "I discovered things at the same time as my character," she said. She has some nudity in the shower, in a lake and in a love scene. "I'm not super modest. And there was respect on the set," said Charlotte.
