= Tom McBeath =

Canadian actor (born 1946)

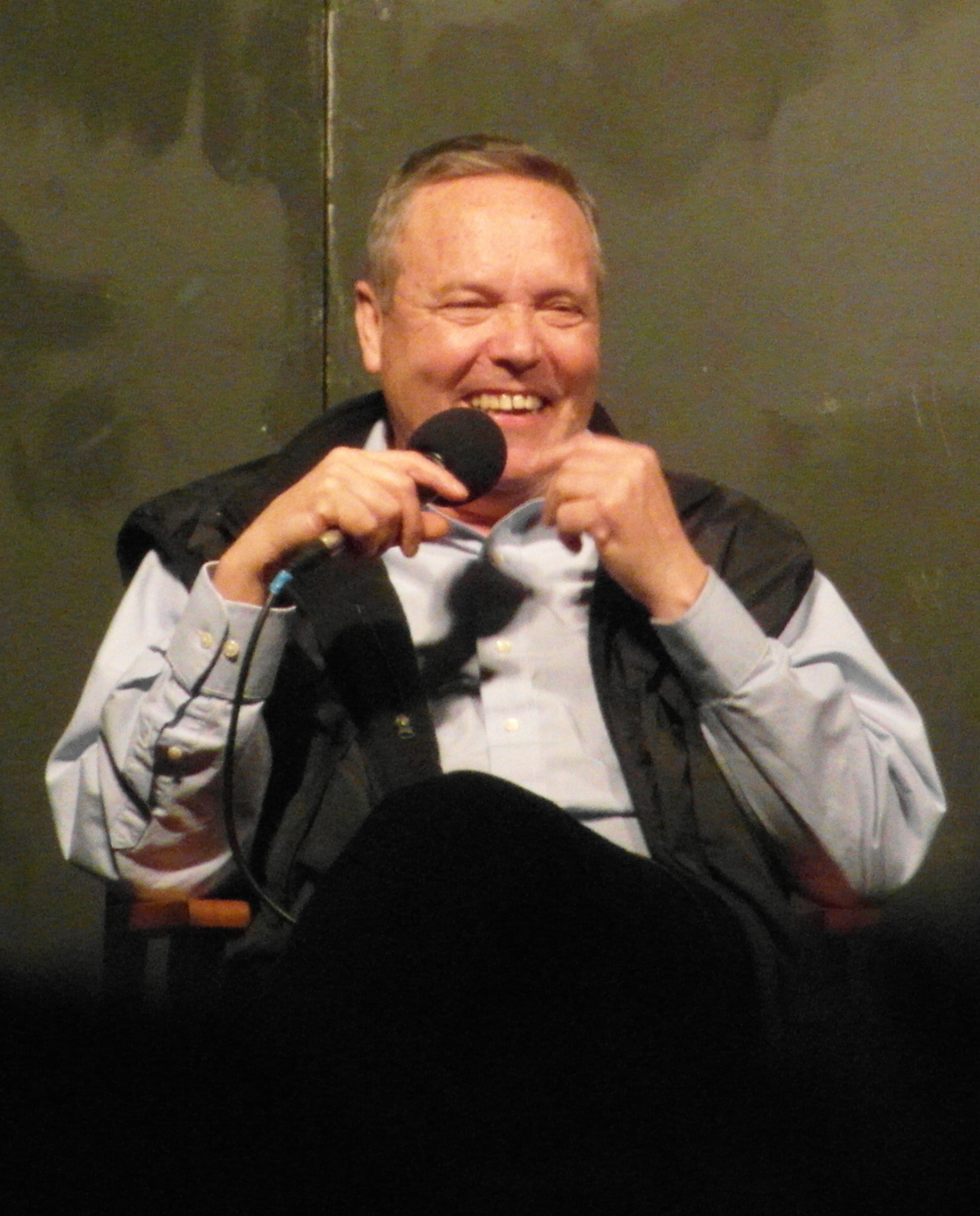
- Tom McBeath at Chevron 7.8
- Born: May 2, 1946 (age 80); Vancouver, British Columbia, Canada
- Years active: 1984–present

Tom McBeath (born May 2, 1946) is a Canadian actor. He is the winner of three Jessie Awards best known for playing Col. Harold Maybourne on Stargate SG-1. In 2017, he started playing Smithers on Riverdale.

== Biography ==
He appeared in an episode of Street Justice and later, a second season episode and a fifth season episode of Highlander. He is best known for playing Harry Maybourne on Stargate SG-1, a role for which he was nominated for a Gemini Award in 1998 and a Leo Award in 2005. He is also a stage actor known to take a diverse set of roles.

== Selected filmography ==
- The Glitter Dome (1984, TV Movie) as Farrell
- Certain Fury (1985) as Policeman
- Love, Mary (1985, TV Movie) as Dr. Pearl
- Into Thin Air (1985, TV Movie) as Bank Account Manager
- Red Serge (1986, TV Series) as Constable Murphy
- Malone (1987) as 'Stringbean'
- Backfire (1988) as Man In Bar
- Christmas Comes to Willow Creek (1987, TV Movie) as Sergeant
- The Accused (1988) as Defendant Stu Holloway
- Cousins (1989) as Mr. Dionne
- Quarantine (1989) as Lieutenant Beck
- Sky High (1990, TV Movie) as Auctioneer
- Burning Bridges (1990, TV Movie) as Al
- Cadence (1990) as Principal
- Narrow Margin (1990) as Conductor #2
- Run (1991) as 'Smithy'
- My Son Johnny (1991, TV Movie) as Detective Morgan
- Yes Virginia, There is a Santa Claus (1991, TV Movie) as Sergeant Flynn
- Miles from Nowhere (1992, TV Movie) as Father Harney
- The Man Upstairs (1992, TV Movie) as Priest
- Relentless: Mind of a Killer (1993, TV Movie) as Edmond Price
- Without a Kiss Goodbye (1993, TV Movie)
- The Sea Wolf (1993, TV Movie) as Latimer
- Whose Child Is This? The War for Baby Jessica (1993, TV Movie) as John Monroe
- The X-Files (1993-1996 TV Series) as Dr. Lewton / Detective Gwynn / Scientist
- Timecop (1994) as T.E.C. Technician
- A Christmas Romance (1994, TV Movie) as Mr. Macklin
- Hideaway (1995) as Morton Redlow
- Deadlocked: Escape from Zone 14 (1995, TV Movie) as Senator Don Boyd
- She Stood Still: The Tailhook Scandal (1995, TV Movie) as Tailhook Spokesman
- Black Fox: Good Men and Bad (1995, TV Movie)
- The Omen (1995, TV Movie) as Felt Hat Man
- Ebbie (1995, TV Movie) as Van Munsen
- Trust in Me (1996) as Dutch Schultz
- The Limbic Region (1996, TV Movie) as Fredricks
- In Cold Blood (1996, TV Mini-Series) as Alfred Stoecklein
- Kitchen (1997) as Rick
- Final Descent (1997, TV Movie) as Pilot of Private Plane N9478C
- Tricks (1997, TV Movie) as Mike
- Dog's Best Friend (1997, TV Movie) as Bob Handel
- True Heart (1997) as Quint
- Firestorm (1998) as Loomis
- Goldrush: A Real Life Alaskan Adventure (1998)
- Nick Fury: Agent of Shield (1998, TV Movie) as Director General Jack Pincer
- Stargate SG-1 as Harry Maybourne (1998-2005)
- Atomic Train (1999, TV Mini-Series) as Hank
- A Murder on Shadow Mountain (1999, TV Movie) as District Attorney Arthur DiMarco
- Double Jeopardy (1999) as Coast Guard Officer
- In a Class of His Own (1999, TV Movie) as Skip Jordan
- Aftershock: Earthquake in New York (1999, TV Mini-Series) as George
- Skullduggery (2000, TV Series) as Muldoon
- They Nest (2000, TV Movie) as Eamon Wald
- High Noon (2000, TV Movie) as Rudy
- Along Came a Spider (2001) as Chief Cabell
- Off Season (2001, TV Movie) as Mel Breskin
- Sins of the Father (2002, TV Movie) as J. Edgar Hoover
- Cable Beach (2004, TV Movie) as John 'Luther' Croat
- Supervolcano (2005, TV Movie) as Michael Eldridge
- The Deal (2005) as Board Member #1
- Regarding Sarah (2006) as Obsessive Lawyer
- Eight Days to Live (2006, TV Movie) as Expert
- My Baby is Missing (2007, TV Movie) as Don Walters
- Luna: Spirit of the Whale (2007, TV Movie) as Ernie Ivers
- The Bad Son (2007, TV Movie) as Mark Petrocelli
- Enemy Within (2007, TV Movie) as Sheriff Gene
- Beneath (2007) as Mr. Wells
- Aliens vs. Predator: Requiem (2007) as Karl
- The Andromeda Strain (2008) as Kyle Tobler
- Alien Trespass (2009) as Wilson
- Watchmen (2009) as News Analyst
- Living Out Loud (2009, TV Movie) as Ultrasound Technician
- Christmas in Canaan (2009, TV Movie) as Carl
- The Search for Santa Paws (2010) as Cabbie
- Recoil (2011) as Sheriff Cole
- Gaku (2012, TV Movie) as Moss
- The Woodcarver (2012) as Principal Stark
- The Philadelphia Experiment (2012, TV Movie) as Broadmore
- Camera Shy (2012) as Detective Oslo
- Down River (2013) as Bob
- No Men Beyond This Point (2015) as Jim
- Patterson's Wager (2015) as Dr. Collins
- Travelers (2016, TV Series) as Ellis
- Prodigals (2017) as Judge
- Riverdale (2017–2023, TV Series) as Smithers
- Time for Me to Come Home for Christmas (2018, TV film) as Henry Roamer
- A Godwink Christmas: Meant for Love (2019, TV film) as Charlie
- A Million Little Things (2020, TV series) as Flannel Shirt Man
