= Marie Gignac =

Canadian actress

Marie Gignac CM is a two-time Genie Award–nominated actress. Gignac has been nominated twice in the category of Best Supporting Actress each for The Confessional (Le Confessionnal) and The Secret Life of Happy People (La Vie secrète des gens heureux).

In 2011, she was made a Member of the Order of Canada "for her contributions to the performing arts as an actress, director, playwright and artistic director of Québec’s Carrefour international de théâtre."
