= A Family Secret (film) =

2006 film by Ghyslaine Côté

- Canadian Poster
- French: Le Secret de ma mère
- Directed by: Ghyslaine Côté
- Written by: Ghyslaine Côté; Martin Girard
- Produced by: Julien Remillard (executive producer); Maxime Rémillard; André Rouleau (producer)
- Starring: David Boutin; Ginette Reno; Céline Bonnier; Clémence DesRochers; Marie-Chantal Perron
- Cinematography: Pierre Mignot
- Edited by: Richard Comeau
- Music by: Normand Corbeil
- Distributed by: Remstar Distribution
- Release date: July 7, 2006
- Running time: 86 minutes
- Country: Canada
- Language: French
- Budget: $ 5,450,000 (estimated)

A Family Secret (French: Le Secret de ma mère) is a 2006 Canadian comedy-drama film.

== Plot ==
Set on New Year's Day, Jos' (David Boutin) family and friends gather together at a funeral parlour where chaos ensues.

== Awards and nominations ==
A Family Secret earned two Genie Award nominations (Genie Award for Best Performance by an Actress in a Leading Role for Ginette Reno and Genie Award for Best Original Screenplay) and won a Stony Brook Film Festival award for Best Feature.
