= Stéphane Lapointe =

- Born: February 20, 1971 (age 54); Canada
- Occupation(s): Director, screenwriter

Stéphane Lapointe (born February 20, 1971) is a Canadian film and television director and screenwriter, who won the Claude Jutra Award at the 27th Genie Awards in 2006 for his debut film The Secret Life of Happy People (La Vie secrète des gens heureux). He was also a nominee for Best Director and Best Original Screenplay.

He was previously a nominee for Best Live Action Short Drama at the 22nd Genie Awards in 2002, for his short film Side Orders (Foie de canard et cœur de femme).

Lapointe was born in Quebec City, Quebec. He has also directed The Masters of Suspense (Les Maîtres du suspense), and episodes of the Quebec TV series Hommes en quarantaine, Roxy, Bye Bye and Tout sur moi.
