= Congorama =

- Christal Films theatrical poster for Congorama
- Directed by: Philippe Falardeau
- Written by: Philippe Falardeau
- Produced by: Joseph Rouschop; Éric Tavitian
- Starring: Olivier Gourmet; Paul Ahmarani; Jean-Pierre Cassel; Gabriel Arcand; Lorraine Pintal; Claudia Tagbo; Arnaud Mouithys; Jean-Luc Couchard
- Cinematography: André Turpin
- Edited by: Frédérique Broos
- Music by: Jarby Mc Coy
- Distributed by: Les Films Christal (Canada); Benelux Film Distributors (Benelux); UGC PH (France)
- Release dates: May 25, 2006 (Cannes Film Festival); January 17, 2007 (Belgium)
- Running time: 105 minutes
- Countries: Canada; Belgium; France
- Language: French
- Budget: $30 million

Congorama is a French-Belgian-Canadian film directed by Philippe Falardeau, released in 2006.

== Plot ==
Michel is a Belgian inventor. He cares for his father, a paralysed writer, is married to a Congolese woman and is the father of an interracial child whom he reassures as to his parentage. He discovers at the age of 41 that he was adopted, actually having been born in Sainte-Cécile, Quebec. In the summer of 2000, he travels to Quebec, supposedly to sell some of his inventions. While on a near-impossible quest to find his birth family in the town where he was born, he crosses paths with Louis Legros, son of another inventor, in a meeting which will change their lives.

== Premiere ==
Congorama received its world premiere at the Directors' Fortnight series held alongside the 2006 Cannes Film Festival.

== Awards ==
Genie Award – Screenplay; Prix Jutra – Picture, Director, Screenplay, Actor (Ahmarani, Gourmet), Supporting Actor (Arcand)
