= Ghyslaine Côté =

Canadian actress

Ghyslaine Côté (born September 6, 1955) is a Canadian director, screenwriter and actor. She is best known for directing The Five of Us (French: Elles étaient cinq), which won the Prize for most popular Canadian film and the prize for best artistic contribution at the 2004 Montreal World Film Festival.

== Filmography ==
- Effusion - 1985
- Femmes sans frontières - 1985
- Jeanne & Jeanne - 1985
- Coup de chance - 1992
- Aux voleurs! - 1993
- Meanwhile (Pendant ce temps...) - short, 1998
- Pin-Pon: The Film (Pin-Pon, le film) - 1999
- Bliss - 2002
- The Five of Us (Elles étaient cinq) - 2004
