= A Sunday in Kigali =

- Poster
- Directed by: Robert Favreau
- Written by: Robert Favreau (screenplay); Gil Courtemanche (original novel)
- Produced by: Lyse Lafontaine and Michael Mosca
- Starring: Luc Picard; Fatou N'Diaye
- Cinematography: Pierre Mignot
- Edited by: Hélène Girard
- Music by: Jorane
- Release date: April 2006
- Running time: 118 minutes
- Country: Canada
- Language: French
- Budget: CAN $7,000,000

A Sunday in Kigali (original French title: Un dimanche à Kigali) is a 2006 Canadian feature film set during the Rwandan genocide. It is directed by Robert Favreau and based on the novel A Sunday at the Pool in Kigali by Gil Courtemanche.

== Plot ==
Bernard Valcourt, a documentary filmmaker and journalist, sets off to Kigali to film a documentary about AIDS. He gets caught up in the turmoil of horrific events involving Hutus and Tutsis that tragically leads to genocide. During his stay at the Hôtel des Mille Collines, Valcourt falls in love with a beautiful, shy waitress named Gentille. Gentille serves drinks to the diplomats, officials, and Rwandan bourgeoisie who surround the hotel swimming pool every Sunday. While Valcourt's longing for Gentille increases, the country moves towards civil war, and the brutal violence of the Rwandan genocide separates them. A few months go by and Bernard returns to Rwanda, frantically seeking Gentille in the midst of the chaos. Most of the narrative unfolds in retrospect.

== Release ==
A Sunday in Kigali grossed $1.1 million Canadian in Quebec in the fall of 2006, and was set for a 2006 September 23 release in English-speaking Canada.

=== Cast ===
- Luc Picard as Bernard Valcourt
- Fatou N'Diaye as Gentille
- Vincent Bilodeau as Father Cardinal
- Céline Bonnier as Élise
- Geneviève Brouillette as Consule
- Alice Isimbi
- Fayolle Jean as Victor
- Maka Kotto as Manu
- Louise Laparé as Manu's Wife
- Alexis Martin as Lamarre
- Luck Mervil as Raphaël
- Mireille Métellus as Agathe
- Luc Proulx as Father Louis
- Guy Thauvette as Lt. Roméo Dallaire
- Erwin Weche as D.J. Rock
- Léonce Ngabo as Maurice
- Jean-Chris Banange as Odeste
- Natacha Muziramakenga as Emerita
- Eric Kabanda as Cyprien
- Amélie Chérubin Soulières as Mathilde
- Jean de la Paix Hategekimana as Cyprien's cousin
- Valentin Utaruhijimana as Célestin
- Johanna Ingabiré as Désirée
- Aline Muhora as Georgina
- Jean Mutsari as Jean Damascène
- Diane Nyiraparasi as Berthe

== Reception ==
=== Box office ===
Eight weeks into its release, Robert Favreau's Rwandan genocide drama is the first Quebecois film of 2006 to pass the CAN $1m benchmark at the local box office.

=== Critical response ===
On Rotten Tomatoes, the film has an approval rate of 88% based on 59 reviews.

The sites' critical consensus reads, "A strident, well-meaning film that makes the mistake of doing all our thinking and feeling for us." Geoff Pevere give the film a 2 out of 4 rating, stating "here's something about the idea of weeping over a single love affair ... while hundreds of thousands are being slaughtered that verges on its own form of myopic irresponsibility." Writer for Variety Robert Koehler also gave it 2 out of 4 stars and said: "Pic is truly undone by a bizarre structure that constantly cuts between the timeframe before the 100-day massacre and the aftermath."

=== Accolades ===
Since its release, the film has been nominated for 42 festivals and awards.

Won
2006 Marrakech International Film Festival – Best Actress (Fatou N'Diaye)
2007 Genie Awards – Best Screenplay, Adapted (Robert Favreau, Gil Courtemanche)
2007 Jutra Awards 2007 – Best Sound (Claude La Haye, Hans Peter Strobl & Marie-Claude Gagné)

Nominated
2006 Marrakech International Film Festival - Golden Star (Robert Favreau)
2007 Genie Awards – Best Motion Picture (Lyse Lafontaine & Michael Mosca)
2007 Genie Awards – Best Achievement in Costume Design (Michèle Hamel)
2007 Genie Awards – Best Achievement in Direction (Robert Favreau)
2007 Genie Awards – Best Performance by an Actor in a Leading Role (Luc Picard)
2007 Genie Awards – Best Performance by an Actress in a Leading Role (Fatou N'Diaye)
2007 Genie Awards – Best Achievement in Overall Sound (Hans Peter Strobl, Jo Caron, Claude La Haye, Benoit Leduc, Bernard Gariépy Strobl)
2007 Genie Awards – Best Achievement in Sound Editing (Marie-Claude Gagné, Guy Francoeur, Claire Pochon, Jean-Philippe Savard)
2007 Jutra Awards 2007 – Best Film (Lyse Lafontaine & Michael Mosca)

More Festivals and Awards

- Toronto International Film Festival (Canada): September 2006
- Atlantic Film Festival (Canada): September 2006
- Cinéfest Sudbury International Film Festival (Canada): September 2006
- Vancouver International Film Festival (Canada): October 2006
- Busan International Film Festival (South Korea): October 2006
- Franzoesiche Filmtage, Tuebingen (Germany): November 2006
- Festival des Films Francophone du Manitoba – Cinémental (Canada): November 2006
- Festival International du Film Francophone de Tuebingen-Stuttgart (Germany): November 2006
- Windsor International Film Festival (Canada): November 2006
- Cape Town World Cinema Festival (South Africa): November 2006
- Johannesburg Film Festival South Africa (South Africa): November 2006
- Semaine du Cinéma Canadien (Senegal): November 2006
- Festival du Québec à Paris (France): November 2006
- Pan African Film Festival (USA): February 2007
- Brazzaville Film Festival (Congo): 2007
- Fédération des Francophones du Saskatoon (Canada): February 2007
- Kalamazoo Francophone Film Festival (USA): March 2007
- Maputo Film Festival (Mozambique): September 2007
- Lusaka Film Festival (Zambia): November 2007
- Alger Film Festival (Algeria): December 2007
- Seattle Film Festival (USA): June/July 2007
- Stony Brook Film Festival (USA): July 2007
- Festival El Cine in Lima (Peru): August 2007
- Les 25e Rendez-vous du Cinéma Québécois (Canada): February 2007
- Bermuda International Film Festival (Bermuda): March 2007 – The 10th edition of the Bermuda International Film Festival came to a close when the French Canadian film "A Sunday in Kigali" won the Bacardi Limited Audience Choice Award.
- Tiburon International Film Festival (USA): March 2007
- Semaine de la Francophonie 2007, Boston Mars 2007 / Athènes Mars 2007 / New York Avril 2007
- Phoenix Film Festival (USA): April 2007 – Peoples Choice & Best Feature Film
- Kinshasa Film Festival (Congo): June 2007
- FÉMI Festival International du Cinéma de la Guadeloupe (Guadeloupe): January 2007
