= Cheech (film) =

- Directed by: Patrice Sauvé
- Written by: François Létourneau
- Based on: Cheech by François Létourneau
- Produced by: Nicole Robert
- Cinematography: Yves Bélanger
- Edited by: Michel Grou
- Music by: Normand Corbeil
- Production company: Go Films
- Distributed by: Alliance Atlantis Vivafilm (Canada); Seville Pictures (International)
- Release date: September 2006 (TIFF)
- Running time: 105 minutes
- Country: Canada
- Language: French

Cheech is a 2006 Canadian comedy-drama film directed by Patrice Sauvé (his feature film directorial debut) and written by François Létourneau, based on his own prior stage play Cheech, ou Les hommes de Chrysler sont en ville. The film premiered at the 2006 Toronto International Film Festival.

== Plot ==
Ron runs an escort service in a rundown part of Montreal. His murder leads to suspicion of a number of suspects. They include Cheech, the rival escort agency owner, and Stephanie, a prostitute who wants to leave the business. The film captures a day in the life of six people whose lives intersect in unexpected ways. Their quest for happiness reveals each of them to one another in unexpected ways.

== Recognition ==
- 2007 – Nominated – Genie Award for Best Adapted Screenplay (François Létourneau)
- 2007 – Nominated – Genie Award for Best Achievement in Editing (Michel Grou)
- 2007 – Nominated – Genie Award for Best Achievement in Music - Original Score (Normand Corbeil)
- 2007 – Nominated – Genie Award for Best Achievement in Sound Editing (Pierre-Jules Audet, Guy Francoeur, Guy Pelletier)
- 2007 – Nominated – Canadian Society of Cinematographers award for Best Cinematography in Theatrical Feature (Yves Bélanger)
