= Robert Favreau =

Canadian film director and film editor

- Born: July 9, 1948 (age 76); Montreal, Quebec
- Occupation(s): Film director Screenwriter
- Years active: 1975 - Present

Robert Favreau (born July 9, 1948) is a Canadian film director and film editor.

His film Les muses orphelines earned him Genie Award and Jutra Award nominations for Best Director. His follow-up feature, Un dimanche à Kigali earned him another Genie Award nomination for Best Director as well as a nomination for Best Motion Picture.

== Filmography ==
Film

| Year | Title | Director | Writer | Editor |
|---|---|---|---|---|
| 1975 | Le soleil a pas d'chance | Yes | No | Yes |
| 1980 | Corridors | Yes | No | Yes |
| 1980 | Pris au piège | Yes | No | Yes |
| 1989 | Looking for Eternity (Portion d'éternité) | Yes | No | No |
| 1991 | Nelligan | Yes | Yes | No |
| 2000 | The Orphan Muses (Les Muses orphelines) | Yes | No | No |
| 2005 | Pied-de-biche | Yes | No | No |
| 2006 | A Sunday in Kigali (Un dimanche à Kigali) | Yes | Yes | No |

Television

- L'ombre de l'épervier (1998)
- L'ombre de l'épervier II (2000)
