= The Secret Life of Happy People =

- French: La vie secrète des gens heureux
- Directed by: Stéphane Lapointe
- Written by: Stéphane Lapointe
- Produced by: Roger Frappier; Luc Vandal
- Starring: Gilbert Sicotte; Marc Paquet; Catherine De Léan; Anne Dorval
- Music by: Nathalie Boileau
- Distributed by: Christal Films (Canada) (theatrical)
- Release date: September 5, 2006
- Running time: 101 minutes
- Country: Canada
- Language: French

The Secret Life of Happy People (French: La vie secrète des gens heureux) is a 2006 Canadian comedy-drama film.

== Plot ==
Thomas Dufresne (Marc Paquet) is the black sheep of his bourgeois family. One day, he meets a free-spirited waitress named Audrey (Catherine De Léan) who changes his life. Thomas eventually finds out the truth behind their seemingly innocent encounter, which may change his family forever.

== Recognition ==
- 2006 Borsos Competition for Best Canadian Film - Won
- 2007 Claude Jutra Award - Stéphane Lapointe - Won (tied with Julia Kwan for Eve and the Fire Horse)
- 2007 Jutra Award for Best Film - Roger Frappier
  Luc Vandal - Nominated
- 2007 Genie Award for Best Achievement in Direction - Stéphane Lapointe - Nominated
- 2007 Genie Award for Best Achievement in Music - Original Score - Pierre Desrochers - Nominated
- 2007 Genie Award for Best Performance by an Actress in a Supporting Role - Marie Gignac - Nominated
- 2007 Genie Award for Best Original Screenplay - Stéphane Lapointe - Nominated
