= The Nature of Love =

2023 Canadian film

- Release poster
- French: Simple comme Sylvain
- Directed by: Monia Chokri
- Written by: Monia Chokri
- Produced by: Nancy Grant; Sylvain Corbeil
- Starring: Magalie Lépine-Blondeau; Pierre-Yves Cardinal
- Cinematography: André Turpin
- Edited by: Pauline Gaillard
- Music by: Émile Sornin
- Production company: Metafilms
- Distributed by: MK2 Films
- Release date: May 18, 2023 (Cannes)
- Running time: 112 minutes
- Country: Canada
- Language: French
- Box office: $2.4 million

The Nature of Love (French: Simple comme Sylvain) is a 2023 Canadian romantic comedy-drama film directed by Monia Chokri.

The film had its world premiere in the Un Certain Regard section at the 2023 Cannes Film Festival on 18 May 2023.

== Plot ==
University professor Sophia has a comfortable life and a stable but unexciting marriage to Xavier. That is upended when she meets and is attracted to Sylvain, a blue-collar construction contractor whom the couple hires to renovate their summer home.

== Cast ==
- Magalie Lépine-Blondeau as Sophie
- Pierre-Yves Cardinal as Sylvain
- Monia Chokri as Françoise
- Francis-William Rhéaume as Xavier
- Steve Laplante as Philippe
- Marie-Ginette Guay as Sylvie
- Micheline Lanctôt as Madeleine
- Guillaume Laurin as Olivier
- Linda Sorgini as Guylaine
- Mathieu Baron as Kevin
- Christine Beaulieu as Karine
- Lubna Playoust as Joséphine
- Guy Thauvette as Pierre
- Karelle Tremblay as Camélia

== Production ==
Production on the film was first announced in fall 2022.

== Release ==
The film premiered in the Un Certain Regard section at the 2023 Cannes Film Festival on 18 May 2023.

== Critical response ==
Catherine Bray of Variety praised the film, writing that "The film is impeccably cast. As Sophia, Magalie Lépine Blondeau (whom Chokri first directed ten years ago in her hugely successful short An Extraordinary Person) is wonderful, gifted with great comic timing and a particular knack for telegraphing that sense of someone who knows they’re making a huge mistake, but are compelled to go ahead and make it anyway. That’s handy, since it is perhaps the character’s defining trait. But it’s hard to imagine Blondeau’s role working as well as it does without the right actor as Sylvain, the kind of guy whose compulsive sexual charm is enough, by itself, to swamp every other more cautious instinct. Luckily, Cardinal has form here, having previously sizzled in Xavier Dolan’s Tom at the Farm, as the burly agricultural man’s man to Dolan’s fashionable city boy. Call it screen presence, magnetism, charisma — Cardinal has it."

Savina Petkova of Cineuropa wrote that "Even if The Nature of Love can’t shake off the pessimistic thought that all instances of a heterosexual, monogamous love life are doomed to repeat the same cycle of infatuation/marriage/depletion of desire, it offers a special, nuanced take on love and what love can be. It even suggests a canon of studies on romance – a topic equally neglected in philosophy and ethics – with quotes by the likes of Plato, bell hooks and Vladimir Jankélévitch, but without being didactic in any way. Overall, Chokri’s new film is as confident as its protagonist, a woman who knows how to articulate her desires, to surrender and to leave them behind, when it feels right.”

Maxance Vincent of InSession Film wrote that the movie is "one of the funniest and most heartbreaking movies you’ll see all year, and it cements Chokri as one to watch as a daring auteur who never made the same film twice and will seemingly continue pushing the boundaries of what modern Québec cinema can – and should – be."

== Accolades ==
Award / Film Festival	Date of ceremony	Category	Recipient(s)	Result	Ref.
Cannes Film Festival	May 26, 2023	Un Certain Regard	Monia Chokri	Nominated	
Cannes Film Festival	May 26, 2023	Queer Palm	Monia Chokri	Nominated	
Whistler Film Festival	December 3, 2023	Best Cinematography in a Borsos Competition Film	André Turpin	Won	
Prix collégial du cinéma québécois	April 5, 2024	Best Film	Monia Chokri	Nominated	
César Awards	23 February 2024	Best Foreign Film	The Nature of Love	Won	
Canadian Screen Awards	May 2024	Best Lead Performance in a Comedy Film	Magalie Lépine-Blondeau	Nominated	
Canadian Screen Awards	May 2024	Best Original Screenplay	Monia Chokri	Nominated	
Canadian Screen Awards	May 2024	Best Cinematography	André Turpin	Nominated	
Canadian Screen Awards	May 2024	Best Editing	Pauline Gaillard	Nominated	
Prix Iris	December 8, 2024	Best Film	Sylvain Corbeil, Nancy Grant, Elisha Karmitz, Nathanaël Karmitz	Nominated	
Prix Iris	December 8, 2024	Best Director	Monia Chokri	Won	
Prix Iris	December 8, 2024	Best Actor	Pierre-Yves Cardinal	Nominated	
Prix Iris	December 8, 2024	Best Actress	Magalie Lépine-Blondeau	Nominated	
Prix Iris	December 8, 2024	Best Supporting Actor	Steve Laplante	Nominated	
Prix Iris	December 8, 2024	Best Supporting Actor	Francis-William Rhéaume	Nominated	
Prix Iris	December 8, 2024	Best Screenplay	Monia Chokri	Nominated	
Prix Iris	December 8, 2024	Best Art Direction	Colombe Raby	Nominated	
Prix Iris	December 8, 2024	Best Cinematography	André Turpin	Won	
Prix Iris	December 8, 2024	Best Editing	Pauline Gaillard	Nominated	
Prix Iris	December 8, 2024	Best Sound	François Grenon, Julien Roig, Olivier Guillaume	Nominated	
Prix Iris	December 8, 2024	Best Casting	Annie St-Pierre	Nominated	
Prix Iris	December 8, 2024	Most Successful Film Outside Quebec	Monia Chokri, Sylvain Corbeil, Nancy Grant, Elisha Karmitz, Nathanaël Karmitz	Won	
Prix Iris	December 8, 2024	Prix Michel-Côté	Patrick Roy, Monia Chokri, Sylvain Corbeil, Nancy Grant, Elisha Karmitz, Nathanaël Karmitz	Nominated	
