= Anne Dixon =

Anne Dixon may refer to:

- Anne Dixon (costume designer), Canadian film and television costume designer
- Anne Dixon, Miss Illinois Teen USA
- Anne Dixon, character in Cuckoo (TV series)

== See also ==
- Ann Dixon (disambiguation)
- Anne Dickson, Northern Ireland politician
