= Heather Hedley =

Heather Hedley may refer to:

- Heather Hedley (costume designer), Canadian Screen Award-winning Canadian costume designer
- Heather Headley, Trinidadian-American rhythm and blues singer
