= Lucah Rosenberg-Lee =

Canadian filmmaker

Lucah Rosenberg-Lee is a Canadian filmmaker, most noted as co-director with Michael Mabbott of the 2024 documentary film Any Other Way: The Jackie Shane Story. The film was awarded the DGC Ontario Special Jury Prize from the Best Canadian Feature Documentary award jury at the 2024 Hot Docs Canadian International Documentary Festival, and was named as a finalist for the Rogers Best Canadian Documentary Award at the Toronto Film Critics Association Awards 2024.

Rosenberg-Lee previously directed the short documentary film Passing, and was a producer of Luis De Filippis's short film For Nonna Anna.
