= Melinda Dempster =

Canadian costume designer

Melinda Dempster is a Canadian costume designer. She is most noted for her work on the film Honey Bunch, for which she, Madeleine Sims-Fewer and Heather Hedley won the Canadian Screen Award for Best Costume Design at the 14th Canadian Screen Awards in 2026.

She previously won an award from the Canadian Alliance of Film and Television Costume Arts and Design in 2020, as part of the design team for Baroness von Sketch Show.
