= Morgan Simon =

French director and screenwriter (born 1987)

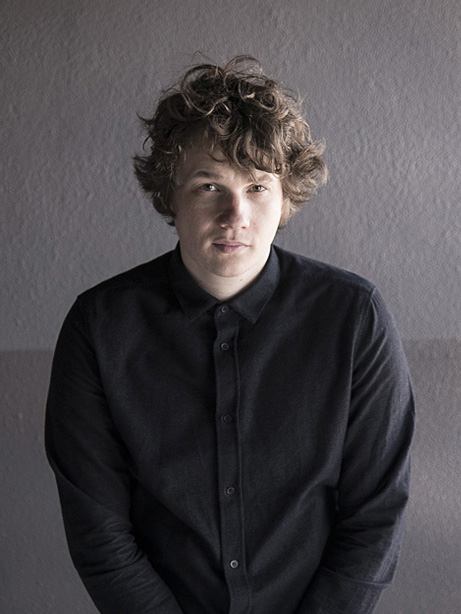
Morgan Simon, French Institute of Athens, 2017

Morgan Simon (born 1987) is a French director, screenwriter and photographer born in the Paris suburbs.

== Life and career ==
Morgan Simon studied screenwriting at La Fémis in Paris. In 2016, his short film Try To Die Young was a César Award nominee.

A Taste of Ink, his first feature film, was developed at L’Atelier de la Cinéfondation during the 2015 Cannes Film Festival^{,} as well as The Jerusalem International Film Lab, rubbing shoulders with László Nemes’s Son of Saul. A Taste of Ink premiered at the 64th San Sebastián Film Festival in the New Directors section and was awarded by a special mention of the jury. It received fifteen awards and was selected by more than fifty festivals, such as Rotterdam, Shanghai, Stockholm, Los Angeles, Zurich, Jerusalem. A Taste of Ink was released in France on January 25, 2017, with Kévin Azaïs, Monia Chokri and Nathan Willcocks as main actors.

In 2018, Simon took part in the Queer Palm jury at the 71st Cannes Film Festival rewarding Girl directed by Lukas Dhont. In 2019, his 35mm short film Ghost Pleasure was selected at the Directors' Fortnight during the 72nd Cannes Film Festival. In 2021, he directed We Shall Meet Again, a short film dealing with migration and narrated by the French writer Édouard Louis.

In 2024, Somewhere In Love, Simon's second feature film is released in France and Belgium. The movie depicts a fusional mother and son story with Valeria Bruni Tedeschi, Félix Lefebvre and Lubna Azabal as main cast. Somewhere In Love was awarded the Fondation Barrière Cinema Prize 2024. For her performance in Somewhere In Love, Valeria Bruni Tedeschi was awarded a special mention of the jury Rampa at the 21st Seville European Film Festival. In 2025, Somewhere In Love received the Best European Union Feature Film Prize at Queer Screen's Mardi Gras Film Festival of Sydney.

== Filmography ==
=== Feature films ===
- 2017: A Taste of Ink (Compte tes blessures)
- 2024: Somewhere In Love (Une vie rêvée)

=== Short films ===
- 2011: A Long Sadness (Une longue tristesse)
- 2011: Goose
- 2012: American Football
- 2014: Try To Die Young (Essaie de mourir jeune)
- 2015: Wake The Dead (Réveiller les morts)
- 2019: Ghost Pleasure (Plaisir Fantôme)
- 2021: We Shall Meet Again (Nous nous reverrons)

=== Music videos ===
- 2017: This Loneliness Won’t Be The Death Of Me - Being As An Ocean
- 2018: Ces garçons-là - Radio Elvis
- 2022: Ma vie - Liv del Estal

=== Video games ===
- 2013: Beyond: Two Souls by David Cage - script editor

== Main awards and nominations ==
- 2014: Screenplay Grand Jury Junior Prize for A Taste of Ink
- 2015: UniFrance Prize nomination for Try To Die Young
- 2016: César Award nomination of the best short film for Try To Die Young
- 2016: Special mention of the jury for A Taste of Ink at San Sebastián Film Festival
- 2024: Fondation Barrière Cinema Prize for Somewhere in Love
- 2025: Best EU Feature Film Prize at Queer Screen's Mardi Gras Film Festival of Sydney for Somewhere in Love
