= Canadian Screen Award for Best Costume Design =

Annual Canadian film award

- Country: Canada
- Presented by: Academy of Canadian Cinema & Television
- First award: 1980
- Currently held by: Melinda Dempster, Madeleine Sims-Fewer & Heather Hedley for Honey Bunch (2025)
- Website: academy.ca/awards

The Canadian Screen Award for Best Costume Design is awarded by the Academy of Canadian Cinema and Television to the best Canadian costume designer. It was formerly called the Genie Award for Best Achievement in Costume Design before the Genies were merged into the Canadian Screen Awards.

== 1980s ==
Year	Nominee	Film	Ref
1980; 1st Genie Awards
1980; 1st Genie Awards	Louise Jobin	Cordélia	
1980; 1st Genie Awards	François Barbeau	Chocolate Eclair (Éclair au chocolat)	
1980; 1st Genie Awards	Linda Matheson	Fish Hawk	
1980; 1st Genie Awards	Patti Unger	Jack London's Klondike Fever	
1980; 1st Genie Awards	Julie Whitfield	Something's Rotten	
1980; 1st Genie Awards	Julie Whitfield	Tanya's Island	
1981; 2nd Genie Awards
1981; 2nd Genie Awards	Anne Pritchard	Fantastica	
1981; 2nd Genie Awards	François Barbeau	Atlantic City, U.S.A.	
1981; 2nd Genie Awards	Louise Jobin	Suzanne	
1981; 2nd Genie Awards	Linda Matheson	Middle Age Crazy	
1981; 2nd Genie Awards	Diane Paquet	Good Riddance (Les bons débarras)	
1982; 3rd Genie Awards
1982; 3rd Genie Awards	Nicole Pelletier	The Plouffe Family (Les Plouffe)	
1982; 3rd Genie Awards	Olga Dimitrov	Silence of the North	
1982; 3rd Genie Awards	Huguette Gagné	Happy Birthday to Me	
1982; 3rd Genie Awards	Julie Ganton	Heartaches	
1982; 3rd Genie Awards	Delphine White	Scanners	
1983; 4th Genie Awards
1983; 4th Genie Awards	John Hay	Quest for Fire	
1983; 4th Genie Awards	Huguette Gagné	Beyond Forty (La Quarantaine)	
1983; 4th Genie Awards	Julie Ganton	Melanie	
1983; 4th Genie Awards	Wendy Partridge	Latitude 55°	
1983; 4th Genie Awards	Christopher Ryan	The Grey Fox	
1984; 5th Genie Awards
1984; 5th Genie Awards	Michèle Hamel	Maria Chapdelaine	
1984; 5th Genie Awards	Michèle Hamel	Lucien Brouillard	
1984; 5th Genie Awards	François Laplante	Au clair de la lune	
1984; 5th Genie Awards	Mary E. McLeod	A Christmas Story	
1984; 5th Genie Awards	Nicole Pelletier	Bonheur d'occasion	
1985; 6th Genie Awards
1985; 6th Genie Awards	Renée April	The Bay Boy	
1985; 6th Genie Awards	Wendy Partridge	Isaac Littlefeathers	
1985; 6th Genie Awards	Huguette Gagné	The Dog Who Stopped the War (La Guerre des tuques)	
1985; 6th Genie Awards	Hélène Schneider	Sonatine	
1985; 6th Genie Awards	Nicole Pelletier	The Crime of Ovide Plouffe (Le crime d'Ovide Plouffe)	
1986; 7th Genie Awards
1986; 7th Genie Awards	Louise Jobin	Joshua Then and Now	
1986; 7th Genie Awards	Sheila Bingham, Phillip Clarkson	My American Cousin	
1986; 7th Genie Awards	Olga Dimitrov	One Magic Christmas	
1986; 7th Genie Awards	Olga Dimitrov	Samuel Lount	
1987; 8th Genie Awards
1987; 8th Genie Awards	Wendy Partridge	Loyalties	
1987; 8th Genie Awards	Michèle Hamel	Exit	
1987; 8th Genie Awards	Nicole Pelletier	In the Shadow of the Wind (Les Fous de Bassan)	
1987; 8th Genie Awards	Louise Jobin	Intimate Power (Pouvoir intime)	
1988; 9th Genie Awards
1988; 9th Genie Awards	Andrée Morin	Night Zoo (Un Zoo la nuit)	
1988; 9th Genie Awards	Alexandra Z, Martine Matthew	I've Heard the Mermaids Singing	
1988; 9th Genie Awards	Denis Sperdouklis	Brother André (Le Frère André)	
1988; 9th Genie Awards	Nicole Pelletier	Marie in the City (Marie s'en va-t-en ville)	
1988; 9th Genie Awards	Michèle Hamel	The Great Land of Small	
1989; 10th Genie Awards
1989; 10th Genie Awards	François Barbeau	The Revolving Doors (Les Portes tournantes)	
1989; 10th Genie Awards	Denise Cronenberg	Dead Ringers	
1989; 10th Genie Awards	Christine Cost, Michèle Hamel	The Mills of Power (Les Tisserands du pouvoir)	
1989; 10th Genie Awards	Maya Mani	Shadow Dancing	
1989; 10th Genie Awards	Renée April	The Kiss	
1989; 10th Genie Awards	Charlotte Penner	The Outside Chance of Maximilian Glick	

== 1990s ==
Year	Nominee	Film	Ref
1990; 11th Genie Awards
1990; 11th Genie Awards	Louise Jobin	Jesus of Montreal (Jésus de Montréal)	
1990; 11th Genie Awards	Maureen Hiscox	Bye Bye Blues	
1990; 11th Genie Awards	Louise Labrecque	Cruising Bar	
1990; 11th Genie Awards	Olga Dimitrov	Millennium	
1990; 11th Genie Awards	Katherine Vieira	Palais Royale	
1990; 11th Genie Awards	Martha Wynne Snetsinger	The Last Winter	
1991; 12th Genie Awards
1991; 12th Genie Awards	Olga Dimitrov	Bethune: The Making of a Hero	
1991; 12th Genie Awards	Ruth Secord	Beautiful Dreamers	
1991; 12th Genie Awards	John Hay, Renée April	Black Robe	
1991; 12th Genie Awards	Andrée Morin	The Party (Le Party)	
1991; 12th Genie Awards	François Laplante	Nelligan	
1992; 13th Genie Awards
1992; 13th Genie Awards	François Barbeau	Léolo	
1992; 13th Genie Awards	François Barbeau	The Saracen Woman (La Sarrasine)	
1992; 13th Genie Awards	Michèle Hamel	Phantom Life (La vie fantôme)	
1992; 13th Genie Awards	Denise Cronenberg	Naked Lunch	
1992; 13th Genie Awards	Alisa Alexander	True Confections	
1993; 14th Genie Awards
1993; 14th Genie Awards	Olga Dimitrov	Shadow of the Wolf	
1993; 14th Genie Awards	Sharon Fedoruk	Harmony Cats	
1993; 14th Genie Awards	Christiane Tessier, Gaudeline Sauriol	The Sex of the Stars (Le Sexe des étoiles)	
1993; 14th Genie Awards	Dolly Ahluwalia, Aline Gilmore	The Burning Season	
1993; 14th Genie Awards	Sheila Bingham	The Lotus Eaters	
1994; 15th Genie Awards
1994; 15th Genie Awards	Linda Muir	Exotica	
1994; 15th Genie Awards	Jacinthe Demers	Jerome's Secret (Le secret de Jérôme)	
1994; 15th Genie Awards	Gaétanne Lévesque	Les pots cassés	
1994; 15th Genie Awards	Francesca Chamberland	Matusalem	
1994; 15th Genie Awards	Sabina Haag	Desire in Motion (Mouvements du désir)	
1995; 16th Genie Awards
1995; 16th Genie Awards	Nicoletta Massone	Margaret's Museum	
1995; 16th Genie Awards	Michele Hamel	Eldorado	
1995; 16th Genie Awards	Barbara Kidd	The Confessional (Le Confessionnal)	
1995; 16th Genie Awards	Crystine Booth	Once in a Blue Moon	
1995; 16th Genie Awards	Linda Muir	When Night Is Falling	
1996; 17th Genie Awards
1996; 17th Genie Awards	Linda Muir	Lilies	
1996; 17th Genie Awards	Emma England	Blood and Donuts	
1996; 17th Genie Awards	Delphine White	The Kids in the Hall: Brain Candy	
1996; 17th Genie Awards	Denis Sperdouklis	Poor Man's Pudding (Pudding chômeur)	
1996; 17th Genie Awards	Elisabetta Beraldo	Swann	
1997; 18th Genie Awards
1997; 18th Genie Awards	Denis Sperdouklis	Karmina	
1997; 18th Genie Awards	Suzanne Harel	The Countess of Baton Rouge (La Comtesse de Bâton Rouge)	
1997; 18th Genie Awards	Francesca Chamberland	The Revenge of the Woman in Black (La vengeance de la femme en noir)	
1997; 18th Genie Awards	Yveline Bonjean, Liz Vandal	Night of the Flood (La nuit du déluge)	
1997; 18th Genie Awards	James A. Worthen	The Hanging Garden	
1997; 18th Genie Awards	Beth Pasternak	The Sweet Hereafter	
1998; 19th Genie Awards
1998; 19th Genie Awards	Renée April	The Red Violin	
1998; 19th Genie Awards	Lovleen Bains	Such a Long Journey	
1998; 19th Genie Awards	Kate Carin	Regeneration	
1998; 19th Genie Awards	Daniel Lalande	Streetheart (Le Cœur au poing)	
1998; 19th Genie Awards	Marie-Chantale Vaillancourt	Nô	
1998; 19th Genie Awards	Tamara Winston	Pale Saints	
1999; 20th Genie Awards
1999; 20th Genie Awards	Renée April	Grey Owl	
1999; 20th Genie Awards	Dominique Lemieux	Alegria	
1999; 20th Genie Awards	Sandy Powell	Felicia's Journey	
1999; 20th Genie Awards	Linda Muir	Jacob Two Two Meets the Hooded Fang	
1999; 20th Genie Awards	Györgyi Szakacs	Sunshine	

== 2000s ==
Year	Nominee	Film	Ref
2000; 21st Genie Awards
2000; 21st Genie Awards	Michel Robidas	Stardom	
2000; 21st Genie Awards	Patricia Hargreaves	Here's to Life!	
2000; 21st Genie Awards	Denis Sperdouklis	Life After Love (La Vie après l'amour)	
2000; 21st Genie Awards	Suzanne Harel	Laura Cadieux II (Laura Cadieux...la suite)	
2000; 21st Genie Awards	Debra Hanson	New Waterford Girl	
2001; 22nd Genie Awards
2001; 22nd Genie Awards	Howard Burden	The War Bride	
2001; 22nd Genie Awards	Atuat Akkitirq	Atanarjuat: The Fast Runner	
2001; 22nd Genie Awards	Sophie Lefebvre	The Woman Who Drinks (La Femme qui boit)	
2001; 22nd Genie Awards	Joanne Hansen	The Claim	
2001; 22nd Genie Awards	Nicoletta Massone	Varian's War	
2002; 23rd Genie Awards
2002; 23rd Genie Awards	Beth Pasternak	Ararat	
2002; 23rd Genie Awards	Wendy Partridge	Almost America	
2002; 23rd Genie Awards	Sophie Lefebvre	The Negro (Le nèg')	
2002; 23rd Genie Awards	Mario Davignon	Savage Messiah	
2002; 23rd Genie Awards	Denise Cronenberg	Spider	
2003; 24th Genie Awards
2003; 24th Genie Awards	Meg McMillan	The Saddest Music in the World	
2003; 24th Genie Awards	Abram Waterhouse	Blizzard	
2003; 24th Genie Awards	Louise Gagné	Seducing Doctor Lewis	
2003; 24th Genie Awards	Michèle Hamel	Séraphin: Heart of Stone (Séraphin: un homme et son péché)	
2003; 24th Genie Awards	Debra Hanson	The Gospel of John	
2004; 25th Genie Awards
2004; 25th Genie Awards	Mario Davignon	Head in the Clouds	
2004; 25th Genie Awards	Sophia Lefebvre	Happy Camper (Camping sauvage)	
2004; 25th Genie Awards	Denis Sperdouklis	Bittersweet Memories (Ma vie en cinémascope)	
2004; 25th Genie Awards	Michèle Hamel	Machine Gun Molly (Monica la mitraille)	
2004; 25th Genie Awards	François Barbeau	Battle of the Brave (Nouvelle-France)	
2005; 26th Genie Awards
2005; 26th Genie Awards	Ginette Magny	C.R.A.Z.Y.	
2005; 26th Genie Awards	Francesca Chamberland	Aurore	
2005; 26th Genie Awards	Francesca Chamberland	The Outlander (Le Survenant)	
2005; 26th Genie Awards	Anne Dixon	Saint Ralph	
2005; 26th Genie Awards	Dolly Ahluwalia	Water	
2006; 27th Genie Awards
2006; 27th Genie Awards	Francesca Chamberland	The Rocket (Maurice Richard)	
2006; 27th Genie Awards	Sandy Buck	Eve and the Fire Horse	
2006; 27th Genie Awards	Michelline Amaaq	The Journals of Knud Rasmussen	
2006; 27th Genie Awards	Mario Davignon, Delphine White	Tideland	
2006; 27th Genie Awards	Michèle Hamel	A Sunday in Kigali	
2007; 28th Genie Awards
2007; 28th Genie Awards	Carlo Poggioli, Kazuko Kurosawa	Silk	
2007; 28th Genie Awards	Denise Cronenberg	Eastern Promises	
2007; 28th Genie Awards	Mary E. McLeod	Fido	
2007; 28th Genie Awards	Dolly Ahluwalia	Partition	
2007; 28th Genie Awards	Joyce Schure	Shake Hands With the Devil	
2008; 29th Genie Awards
2008; 29th Genie Awards	Wendy Partridge	Passchendaele	
2008; 29th Genie Awards	Francesca Chamberland	The Necessities of Life (Ce qu'il faut pour vivre)	
2008; 29th Genie Awards	Marie-Geneviève Cyr	Who Is KK Downey?	
2008; 29th Genie Awards	Michèle Hamel	Mommy Is at the Hairdresser's (Maman est chez le coiffeur)	
2008; 29th Genie Awards	Michèle Hamel	The American Trap (Le Piège américain)	
2009; 30th Genie Awards
2009; 30th Genie Awards	Atuat Akkitirq	Before Tomorrow (Le Jour avant le lendemain)	
2009; 30th Genie Awards	Carmen Alie	Grande Ourse: La Clé des possibles	
2009; 30th Genie Awards	Sarah Armstrong	Nurse.Fighter.Boy	
2009; 30th Genie Awards	Brenda Broer	Cairo Time	
2009; 30th Genie Awards	Anne-Karine Gauthier	1981	

== 2010s ==
Year	Nominee	Film	Ref
2010; 31st Genie Awards
2010; 31st Genie Awards	Nicoletta Massone	Barney's Version	
2010; 31st Genie Awards	Denise Cronenberg	Resident Evil: Afterlife	
2010; 31st Genie Awards	Mario Davignon	The Trotsky	
2010; 31st Genie Awards	Patricia McNeil	The Wild Hunt	
2010; 31st Genie Awards	Beverly Wowchuk	Gunless	
2011; 32nd Genie Awards
2011; 32nd Genie Awards	Marie-Chantale Vaillancourt	Funkytown	
2011; 32nd Genie Awards	Denise Cronenberg	A Dangerous Method	
2011; 32nd Genie Awards	Farnaz Khaki-Sadigh	Afghan Luke	
2011; 32nd Genie Awards	Ginette Magny, Emmanuelle Youchnovski	Café de Flore	
2011; 32nd Genie Awards	Heather Neale	Keyhole	
2012; 1st Canadian Screen Awards
2012; 1st Canadian Screen Awards	Xavier Dolan, François Barbeau	Laurence Anyways	
2012; 1st Canadian Screen Awards	Patricia Henderson	Mad Ship	
2012; 1st Canadian Screen Awards	Wendy Partridge	Resident Evil: Retribution	
2012; 1st Canadian Screen Awards	Wendy Partridge	Silent Hill: Revelation 3D	
2012; 1st Canadian Screen Awards	Éric Poirier	War Witch (Rebelle)	
2013; 2nd Canadian Screen Awards
2013; 2nd Canadian Screen Awards	Carmen Alie	Louis Cyr	
2013; 2nd Canadian Screen Awards	Lea Carlson	The Colony	
2013; 2nd Canadian Screen Awards	Véronique Marchessault	Maïna	
2013; 2nd Canadian Screen Awards	Sarah Millman	Molly Maxwell	
2013; 2nd Canadian Screen Awards	Gersha Phillips	The Mortal Instruments: City of Bones	
2014; 3rd Canadian Screen Awards
2014; 3rd Canadian Screen Awards	Wendy Partridge	Pompeii	
2014; 3rd Canadian Screen Awards	Francesca Chamberland	Henri Henri	
2014; 3rd Canadian Screen Awards	Xavier Dolan	Mommy	
2014; 3rd Canadian Screen Awards	Sarah Dunsworth	Trailer Park Boys: Don't Legalize It	
2014; 3rd Canadian Screen Awards	Valérie Levesque	1987	
2015; 4th Canadian Screen Awards
2015; 4th Canadian Screen Awards	Joanne Hansen	Beeba Boys	
2015; 4th Canadian Screen Awards	Arabella Bushnell	Songs She Wrote About People She Knows	
2015; 4th Canadian Screen Awards	Christopher Hargadon	Forsaken	
2015; 4th Canadian Screen Awards	Katelynd Johnston	Hyena Road	
2015; 4th Canadian Screen Awards	Judy Jonker	Corbo	
2016; 5th Canadian Screen Awards
2016; 5th Canadian Screen Awards	Patricia McNeil	Nelly	
2016; 5th Canadian Screen Awards	Bethana Briffett	Weirdos	
2016; 5th Canadian Screen Awards	Mario Davignon	Race	
2016; 5th Canadian Screen Awards	Marjatta Nissinen	The Girl King	
2016; 5th Canadian Screen Awards	Megan Oppenheimer	Operation Avalanche	
2017; 6th Canadian Screen Awards
2017; 6th Canadian Screen Awards	Trysha Bakker	Maudie	
2017; 6th Canadian Screen Awards	Julie Bécotte	We Are the Others (Nous sommes les autres)	
2017; 6th Canadian Screen Awards	Mario Davignon	Hochelaga, Land of Souls (Hochelaga, terre des âmes)	
2017; 6th Canadian Screen Awards	Brigitte Desroches	Cross My Heart (Les Rois mongols)	
2017; 6th Canadian Screen Awards	Gabrielle Tougas-Fréchette	All You Can Eat Buddha	
2018; 7th Canadian Screen Awards
2018; 7th Canadian Screen Awards	Patricia McNeil	The Great Darkened Days (La grande noirceur)	
2018; 7th Canadian Screen Awards	Lea Carlson	Stockholm	
2018; 7th Canadian Screen Awards	Eugénie Clermont	A Colony (Une colonie)	
2018; 7th Canadian Screen Awards	Hanna Puley	Octavio Is Dead!	
2018; 7th Canadian Screen Awards	Mara Zigler	Firecrackers	
2019; 8th Canadian Screen Awards
2019; 8th Canadian Screen Awards	Patricia McNeil	The Twentieth Century	
2019; 8th Canadian Screen Awards	Anne Dixon	The Song of Names	
2019; 8th Canadian Screen Awards	Patricia McNeil	A Brother's Love (La femme de mon frère)	
2019; 8th Canadian Screen Awards	Caroline Poirier	And the Birds Rained Down (Il pleuvait des oiseaux)	
2019; 8th Canadian Screen Awards	Marissa Schwartz, Mara Zigler	American Woman	

== 2020s ==
Year	Nominee	Film	Ref
2020; 9th Canadian Screen Awards
2020; 9th Canadian Screen Awards	Noémi Poulin	Blood Quantum	
2020; 9th Canadian Screen Awards	Bernadette Croft	Happy Place	
2020; 9th Canadian Screen Awards	Anne Dixon	Falling	
2020; 9th Canadian Screen Awards	Marie Grogan Hales	The Marijuana Conspiracy	
2020; 9th Canadian Screen Awards	Patricia McNeil, Ann Roth	My Salinger Year	
2021; 10th Canadian Screen Awards
2021; 10th Canadian Screen Awards	Kendra Terpenning	Night Raiders	
2021; 10th Canadian Screen Awards	Lea Carlson	The Exchange	
2021; 10th Canadian Screen Awards	Josée Castonguay	The Time Thief (L'Arracheuse de temps)	
2021; 10th Canadian Screen Awards	Francesca Chamberland	Maria Chapdelaine	
2021; 10th Canadian Screen Awards	Francesca Chamberland	The Vinland Club (Le Club Vinland)	
2022; 11th Canadian Screen Awards
2022; 11th Canadian Screen Awards	Hanna Puley	Brother	
2022; 11th Canadian Screen Awards	Sig Burwash, Kathleen Darling	Queens of the Qing Dynasty	
2022; 11th Canadian Screen Awards	Carrie Cathrae-Keeling	Cult Hero	
2022; 11th Canadian Screen Awards	Sophie Lefebvre	Viking	
2022; 11th Canadian Screen Awards	Mayou Trikerioti	Crimes of the Future	
2022; 11th Canadian Screen Awards	Mara Zigler	Tenzin	
2023; 12th Canadian Screen Awards
2023; 12th Canadian Screen Awards	Hanna Puley	BlackBerry	
2023; 12th Canadian Screen Awards	Kelly-Anne Bonieux	Humanist Vampire Seeking Consenting Suicidal Person (Vampire humaniste cherche suicidaire consentant)	
2023; 12th Canadian Screen Awards	Rosalie Clermont	Ru	
2023; 12th Canadian Screen Awards	Athena Theny	Seagrass	
2023; 12th Canadian Screen Awards	Mara Zigler	Something You Said Last Night	
2024; 13th Canadian Screen Awards
2024; 13th Canadian Screen Awards	Negar Nemati	Universal Language (Une langue universelle)	
2024; 13th Canadian Screen Awards	Anne Dixon	The Shrouds	
2024; 13th Canadian Screen Awards	Debra Hanson	Seven Veils	
2024; 13th Canadian Screen Awards	Hanna Puley	Humane	
2024; 13th Canadian Screen Awards	Mara Zigler	Matt and Mara	
2025; 14th Canadian Screen Awards
2025; 14th Canadian Screen Awards	Melinda Dempster, Madeleine Sims-Fewer, Heather Hedley	Honey Bunch	
2025; 14th Canadian Screen Awards	Chelsea Graham	Deathstalker	
2025; 14th Canadian Screen Awards	Leslie Kavanagh	Whistle	
2025; 14th Canadian Screen Awards	Crystal Silden	All the Lost Ones	
2025; 14th Canadian Screen Awards	Mara Zigler	Measures for a Funeral	

== See also ==
- Prix Iris for Best Costume Design
