= Monia Chokri =

Canadian actress and filmmaker

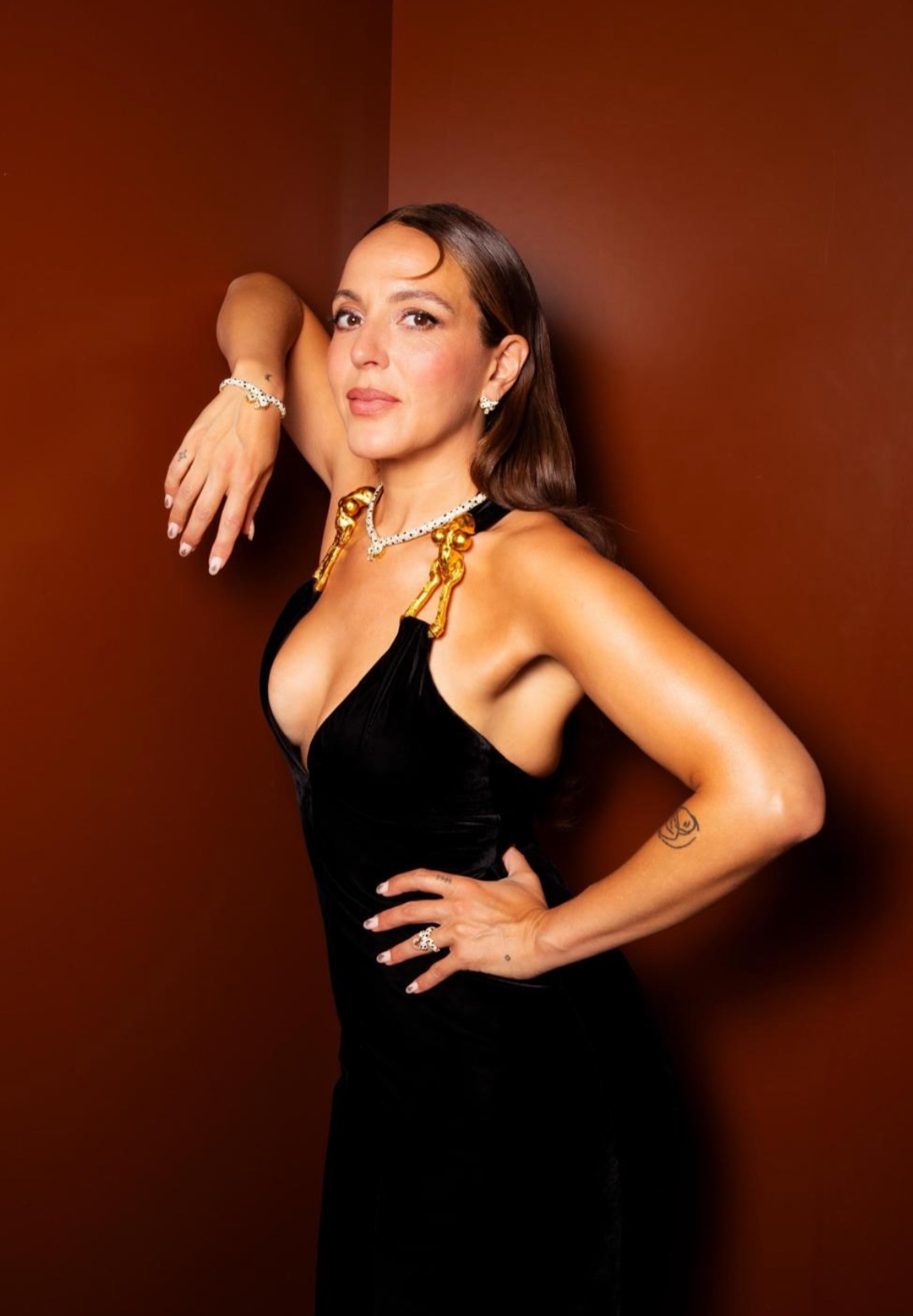
- Chokri in 2026
- Born: 27 June 1982 (age 44); Quebec City, Quebec
- Occupations: Actress, filmmaker

Monia Chokri (born 27 June 1982) is a Canadian actress and filmmaker.

== Life and career ==
Born in Quebec City in 1982, Chokri began her acting career after she completed her studies at Conservatoire d'art dramatique de Montréal in 2005. Her mother is of Scottish descent, while her father is Tunisian with Berber roots.

In addition to having played in several theatre productions in Montreal, Chokri has received notable roles in films presented at the Cannes Film Festival directed by Québécois filmmakers who are better known outside of Canada, namely Denys Arcand and Xavier Dolan. In Heartbeats, she played Marie, a young woman who falls in love with the same man as her gay male best friend Francis, played by Dolan, who also directed. The quality of her acting has been noted by critics, notably in Les Inrockuptibles and Le Monde.

At the end of 2010, the readers of Les Inrockuptibles named Chokri #4 on their list of the top actresses of the year for her performance in Heartbeats.

Her debut as a director, the short film An Extraordinary Person (Quelqu'un d'extraordinaire), was released in 2013 and won the Prix Jutra for Best Live Action Short Film at the 16th Jutra Awards. Her feature debut, A Brother's Love (La femme de mon frère), premiered at the 2019 Cannes Film Festival.

Babysitter, in which she was both the director and an actress, was released in 2022. She received a Canadian Screen Award nomination for Best Lead Performance in a Film at the 11th Canadian Screen Awards in 2023.

== Filmography ==
- Days of Darkness (L'Âge des ténèbres), 2007 – Aziza
- Frédérique au centre, 2008 – Frédérique
- Hier, demain, hier, 2009 – Maya
- Heartbeats (Les Amours imaginaires), 2010 – Marie
- Laurence Anyways, 2012 – Stéfanie Belair
- Clémenceau, 2012 – Charlotte Beauséjour
- Gare du Nord, 2013 – Joan
- Nouvelle adresse, 2014–2015
- All Yours (Je suis à toi), 2014
- Endorphine, 2015
- The Saver, 2015
- Heal the Living, 2016
- A Taste of Ink, 2017 – Julia
- Ravenous (Les Affamés), 2017 – Tania
- Emma Peeters, 2018 – Emma
- A Brother's Love (La femme de mon frère), 2019 – director, screenwriter
- We Are Gold (Nous sommes Gold), 2019 – Marianne
- Before We Explode (Avant qu'on explose), 2019
- Babysitter, 2022 – Nadia, also director
- Falcon Lake, 2022 – Violette
- The Nature of Love (Simple comme Sylvain), 2023 – director, screenwriter
- Love Me Tender, 2025 - Sarah
- Out of Love, 2025 - Nicole, It will competing for Crystal Globe at the KVIFF.
- Where Souls Go (Où vont les âmes?), 2025 - Ève
- Love Letters, 2025 - Nadia

== Awards and nominations ==
Award	Year	Category	Work	Result	Ref.
Canadian Film Festival	2023	Best Feature	Babysitter	Won	
Canadian Screen Awards	2023	Best Performance in a Leading Role	Babysitter	Nominated	
Canadian Screen Awards	2024	Best Original Screenplay	The Nature of Love	Nominated	
Cannes Film Festival	2019	Prix Un Certain Regard	A Brother's Love	Nominated	
Cannes Film Festival	2019	Un Certain Regard – Coup de cœur du Jury	A Brother's Love	Won	
Cannes Film Festival	2019	Caméra d'Or	A Brother's Love	Nominated	
Cannes Film Festival	2023	Prix Un Certain Regard	The Nature of Love	Nominated	
Cannes Film Festival	2023	Queer Palm	The Nature of Love	Nominated	
César Awards	2024	Best Foreign Film	The Nature of Love	Won	
Festival du nouveau cinéma	2013	Best Canadian or Québécois Short Film	An Extraordinary Person	Won	
Locarno Film Festival	2013	Pardi di Domani	An Extraordinary Person	Nominated	
Locarno Film Festival	2013	Junior Jury Award	An Extraordinary Person	Won	
Prix Iris	2013	Best Supporting Actress	Laurence Anyways	Nominated	
Prix Iris	2014	Best Live Action Short Film	An Extraordinary Person	Won	
Prix Iris	2020	Best Director	A Brother's Love	Nominated	
Prix Iris	2023	Best Director	Babysitter	Nominated	
Prix Iris	2024	Best Director	The Nature of Love	Won	
Prix Iris	2024	Best Screenplay	The Nature of Love	Nominated	
Prix Iris	2024	Most Successful Film Outside Quebec	The Nature of Love	Won (Note: Shared with Sylvain Corbeil, Nancy Grant, Elisha Karmitz and Nathanaël Karmitz.)	
Prix Iris	2024	Prix Michel-Côté	The Nature of Love	Nominated (Note: Shared with Patrick Roy, Sylvain Corbeil, Nancy Grant, Elisha Karmitz and Nathanaël Karmitz.)	
South by Southwest	2014	Jury Award – Narrative Short	An Extraordinary Person	Won	
Tampere Film Festival	2014	Best Fiction	An Extraordinary Person	Won	
Windsor International Film Festival	2023	WIFF Prize in Canadian Film	The Nature of Love	Nominated	
