= It's Only the End of the World (play) =

- Book cover
- Original language: French
- Written by: Jean-Luc Lagarce

Premiere
- Date: 1990

It's Only the End of the World (French: Juste la fin du monde) is a 1990 French play by Jean-Luc Lagarce. It is about a character named Louis who returns to his family to announce his terminal illness. Lagarce wrote the play in 1990, when he was considering his own death. In 2008, the Comédie-Française added the play to its repertoire. It won the 2008 Molière Award for Best Show in a National Theatre. In 2016, it was adapted into a film of the same name by Xavier Dolan.

== Analysis ==
Louis returns home surprisingly and suddenly leaves after family members give monologues of varying lengths in which they sometimes repeat themselves or violate proper grammar. The characters' struggle to communicate in which they sometimes attempt to restate what they meant is a theme in the play and is illustrated by a scene in which Suzanne criticizes two family members for shaking hands like strangers. Contradictory stage directions state that the play is set on "a Sunday" but also that it covers almost one year.

== Film adaptation ==
The Canadian director Xavier Dolan said that when he originally read the play, he felt lost and cited its style and the aggressive nature of the characters. He later reread it and said, "One day, I don't know what it was, I pulled it off my shelf and suddenly understood and appreciated this weird and verbose writing style."

Dolan described the extensive work required to adapt the stage play for film:

I tried to keep the idiosyncrasies and the singularity of Lagarce's vernacular as much as I could.... The play is verbose, the language nervous, and prolix. The characters correct their own grammar constantly, beating themselves up, rewording their own sentences. I kept all that as is, basically - but evidently had to cut down many monologues in size, and some episodes were of course dropped. What was really reshaped is the structure. The second half of the play is almost entirely abstract. Characters talk to everyone and no one, all on stage, yet in different places.... It was very theatrical, I guess, and didn’t provide us with a proper build-up. The climax in the play is only between the lead role and his brother, and is 8 pages long.... So I had to recycle bits and pieces from earlier scenes, omitted scenes and scenes I invented from scratch in order to write a second half, and the end.

Dolan's film won the Grand Prix at the 2016 Cannes Film Festival and other honours.
