= Beth Pasternak =

Canadian costume designer

- Occupation: Costume designer
- Awards: Genie Award for Best Costume Design

Beth Pasternak is a Canadian costume designer. She has worked on films with director Atom Egoyan, such as The Sweet Hereafter (1997), Ararat (2002) and Where the Truth Lies, as well as Kevin Smith's 2011 horror film Red State.

Pasternak was nominated for the Genie Award for Best Costume Design for The Sweet Hereafter. For Ararat, she had to have historically modeled costumes made by hand, and won the Genie Award for Best Costume Design.
