= Renée April =

Canadian costume designer

- Occupation: Costume designer

Renée April CM is a Canadian costume designer.

April is from Rivière-du-Loup, Quebec, and her workshop is in Montreal. She designed costumes for approximately 40 productions in Canadian television and film by 2012. She won the Genie Award for Best Costume Design for Grey Owl (1999), a Gemini Award for Million Dollar Babies and was nominated for the Satellite Award for Best Costume Design for The Red Violin (1998).

In her work, she cites influences in paintings and the environment, as well as books and catalogs for stories set in the past. She ran costume design for The Neverending Story at Muse Entertainment in Montreal.

She was featured in Musée de l'Amérique francophone in the exhibit De film en aiguille in 2012. April also contributed costumes for a Cirque du Soleil performance in Tokyo. For Blade Runner 2049 (2017), she designed costumes featuring inauthentic fur, painted cotton disguised as shearling, and breathing masks. She became a Member of the Order of Canada in 2019.
