= Louise Jobin =

Canadian costume designer and art director

- Born: 29 September 1944 (age 80); Montreal, Quebec, Canada
- Occupation(s): Costume designer, art director
- Awards: Genie Award for Best Costume Design

Louise Jobin (born 29 September 1944) is a Canadian costume designer and art director who has worked in both film and television.

Born in Montreal, she was mentored by costume designer François Barbeau. She went on to design the costumes for the film Cordélia, winning the Genie Award for Best Costume Design at the 1st Genie Awards. She won for Costume Design again in 1986 for Joshua Then and Now and Jesus of Montreal (1989). In 1995, she wrote a Heritage Minutes TV short, where she also served as art director.

She was later also a producer, most notably of the film Black Eyed Dog.
