= Inflo Films =

Canadian film production company

Inflo Films is a Toronto-based independent film production company, founded in 2004 by Dusty Mancinelli and Harry Cherniak.

In 2006, Inflo Films produced the short comedy Death to Charlie! In 2007, it released the quirky satire P.U.R.E., which has won several awards and has played at more than a dozen film festivals across the U.S. and Canada including the Cinéfest Sudbury International Film Festival, the Whistler Film Festival and the Washington DC Independent Film Festival. In 2009, its most recent short film, Soap, premiered at the Toronto International Film Festival and was sold to the Canadian Broadcasting Corporation.
