= Ann Dixon =

Ann Dixon may refer to:

- Ann Dixon, character in The Road to Ruin (1934 film)
- Ann Dixon; see National Outdoor Book Award

== See also ==
- Anne Dixon (disambiguation)
