= Matt and Mara =

2024 film by Kazik Radwanski

- Film poster
- Directed by: Kazik Radwanski
- Written by: Kazik Radwanski
- Produced by: Daniel Montgomery; Candice Napoleone
- Starring: Deragh Campbell; Matt Johnson; Mounir Al Shami
- Cinematography: Nikolay Michaylov
- Edited by: Ajla Odobašić
- Production company: MDFF Films
- Distributed by: The Cinema Guild
- Release date: February 20, 2024 (Berlin)
- Running time: 80 minutes
- Country: Canada
- Language: English

Matt and Mara is a 2024 Canadian drama film, written and directed by Kazik Radwanski. The film stars Deragh Campbell as Mara, a university professor in a troubled marriage to Samir (Mounir Al Shami), who unexpectedly reconnects with Matt (Matt Johnson), a man from her past.

The cast also includes Simon Reynolds, Kinshuk Dhingra, Georgia Tannis, Jack Nguyen, Frances Howlett, and Linda Theresa Young.

== Plot ==
Mara, a writing professor in Toronto, reconnects with her former best friend Matt, who is in town to care for his sick dad. He has been living in New York City after publishing a successful book, in contrast to Mara, once a passionate writer, who has spent her time after graduation teaching and has not written anything in years. Despite being married, Mara agrees to spend time with Matt: visiting cafes and going on walks through the city. As the two begin to reconnect, Mara finds herself challenged by Matt's artistic notions.

Matt accompanies Mara on a trip to Ithaca for a conference where the tension culminates and the two share a kiss by Niagara Falls. Unable to allow herself to engage in an affair, but unable to communicate properly, Mara and Matt fight on the drive home.

One night, Mara receives a phone call from Matt that his dad has passed. Mara helps him to figure out funeral arrangements. Matt returns home to New York. Mara listens to a song her husband, a musician, has been working on. Afterwards, Mara flips through her copy of Matt's book and reads over a note he has written for her on the first page. She slips in a dry cleaning receipt addressed to "Matt and Mara," and puts it back on her shelf.

== Cast ==
- Deragh Campbell as Mara
- Matt Johnson as Matt
- Mounir Al Shami as Samir
- Emma Healey as Emma
- Avery Nayman as Avery
- Marlowe Granados as Maeve

== Production ==
The casting for the film was announced late 2020, and the film went into production in 2022.

== Release ==
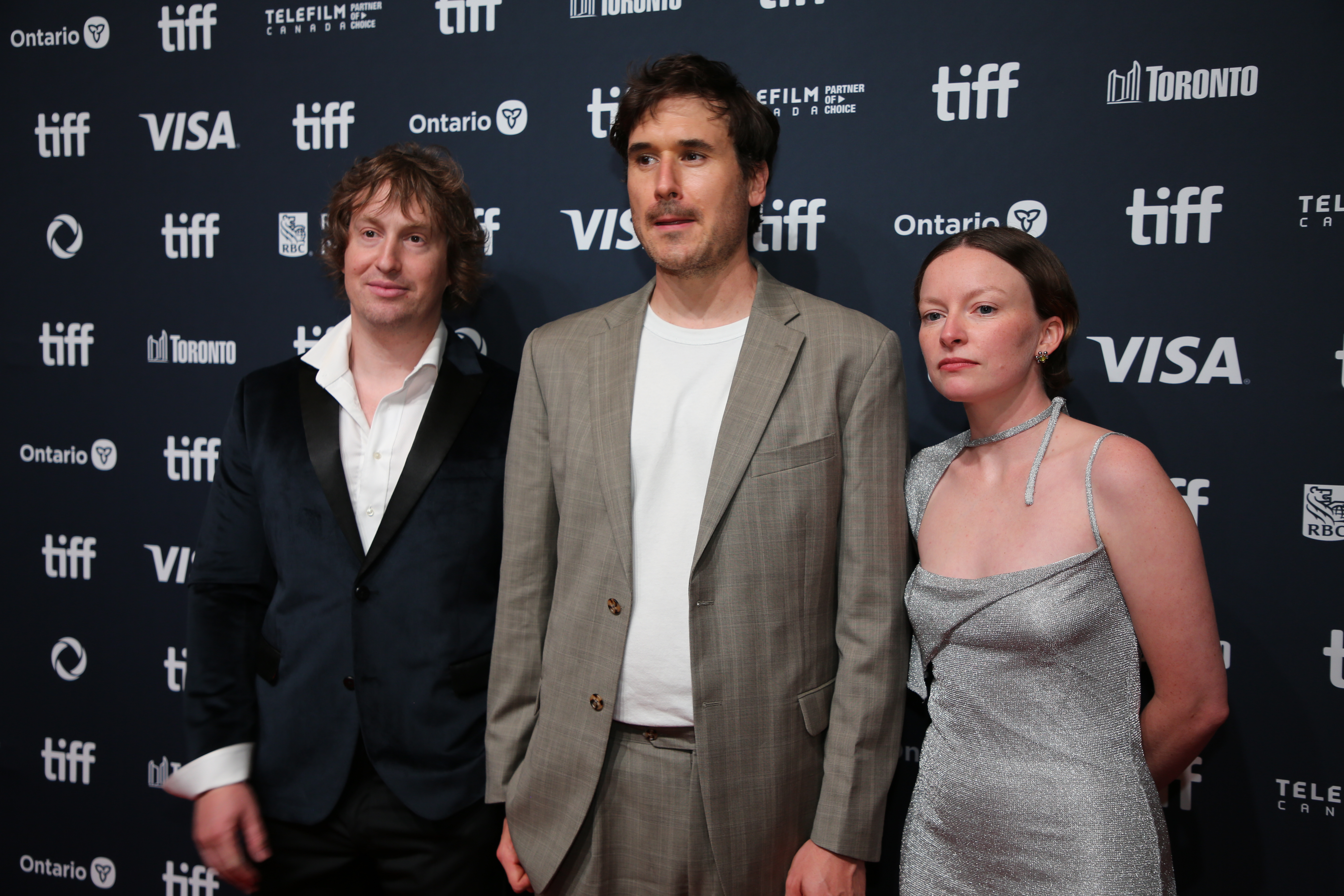
From left: Matt Johnson, Kazik Radwanski, and Deragh Campbell at the 2024 Toronto International Film Festival

It premiered in the Encounters program at the 74th Berlin International Film Festival, and had its Canadian premiere at the 2024 Toronto International Film Festival.

== Reception ==
On the review aggregator website Rotten Tomatoes, 85% of 27 critics' reviews are positive, with an average rating of 7.3/10. Metacritic, which uses a weighted average, assigned the film a score of 68 out of 100, based on 5 critics, indicating "generally favorable" reviews.

Wendy Ide of Screen Daily wrote that "Matt and Mara is one of those films in which very little concrete happens, but the tingling possibility that something might makes it compelling. The appeal is largely due to the casting – Cambell [sic] and Johnson have an undeniable chemistry that is magnified by the improvisational freedom of the picture’s approach. And the agile camerawork deftly captures not just the finely-honed details of both performances, but also the increasingly charged space between the characters."

In a negative review, Sarah Manvel of Critic's Notebook noted, "[the film] could have been delicious. But in this form we are not even being served the cookie dough. All that's here is some raw ingredients with the hope we'll mix them ourselves."

Guy Lodge for Variety wrote that "The fourth feature from Canadian writer-director Kazik Radwanski is an itchy, unsettled and often poignant relationship drama, consistent with his previous works not just in shared personnel — notably lead actors Deragh Campbell and Matt Johnson, who also headlined Radwanski’s 2019 breakout “Anne at 13,000 Ft.” — but in a tingly, seasick storytelling sensibility that makes something volatile and cinematic out of ostensibly static material."

The film was named to TIFF's annual Canada's Top Ten list for 2024.

== Awards ==
Award	Date of ceremony	Category	Recipient(s)	Result	Ref(s)
Canadian Screen Awards	2025	Best Costume Design	Mara Zigler	Nominated	
Canadian Screen Awards	2025	Best Sound Editing	Gabe Knox, Lucas Prokaziuk, Stefan Fraticelli, Justin Helle	Nominated	
Canadian Screen Awards	2025	Best Sound Mixing	Gabe Knox, Ian Reynolds, Paul Lynch, Ron Mellegers	Nominated	
