= It's Only the End of the World =

2016 film by Xavier Dolan

- Film poster
- French: Juste la fin du monde
- Directed by: Xavier Dolan
- Written by: Xavier Dolan
- Based on: Juste la fin du monde by Jean-Luc Lagarce
- Produced by: Sylvain Corbeil; Xavier Dolan; Nancy Grant; Nathanaël Karmitz; Elisha Karmitz; Michel Merkt
- Starring: Nathalie Baye; Vincent Cassel; Marion Cotillard; Léa Seydoux; Gaspard Ulliel
- Cinematography: André Turpin
- Edited by: Xavier Dolan
- Music by: Gabriel Yared
- Production companies: Sons of Manual; MK2 Productions
- Distributed by: Entertainment One; Les Films Séville; Diaphana Films
- Release dates: 19 May 2016 (Cannes); 21 September 2016 (Quebec & France)
- Running time: 99 minutes
- Countries: Canada; France
- Language: French
- Budget: €6.9 million (US$7.4 million)
- Box office: $9.2 million

It's Only the End of the World (French: Juste la fin du monde) is a 2016 drama film written, directed and edited by Xavier Dolan. The film is based on the 1990 play by Jean-Luc Lagarce and stars Gaspard Ulliel, Nathalie Baye, Marion Cotillard, Léa Seydoux, and Vincent Cassel. It is about a young playwright who reunites with his family after a 12-year absence to inform them he is going to die.

A co-production of Canada and France, it was shot in Montreal and Laval, Quebec, beginning in 2015. The small core of actors were selected against typecasting, with Ulliel and Cotillard challenged by the awkwardness in dialogue inherent in Lagarce's work.

The film made its world premiere at the 2016 Cannes Film Festival, where it competed for the Palme d'Or and received mixed reactions from critics. The film won the Cannes Grand Prix - making Dolan the second Canadian director to receive this award, and the Ecumenical Jury Prize at Cannes. It also won six Canadian Screen Awards, including Best Motion Picture, and three César Awards: Best Director, Best Actor and Best Editing. It's Only the End of the World was shortlisted for the Academy Award for Best Foreign Language Film.

== Plot ==
In a place identified only as "Somewhere," Louis, a 34-year-old playwright dealing with a terminal illness, takes a short flight to his home to reunite with his family, whom he has not seen in 12 years. His younger sister, Suzanne, has little memory of him. Upon arriving at the house, Louis' mother, Martine, is surprised to realize Louis has never met the wife of his brother Antoine, Catherine, as Louis was not present at their wedding. Catherine begins telling Louis about her and Antoine's children and nervously stammers to explain why they named one of their boys Louis, after Louis and Antoine's father. Antoine creates tension and snaps that Louis is uninterested in hearing about their children. Louis talks on the telephone to someone and says that he plans to tell his family about his impending death and then leave, and he expresses uncertainty as to how they will react.

Louis and Catherine awkwardly meet in the hallway and attempt to apologize to each other for the tense conversations. Louis remarks that he assumes Antoine has attempted to give her a negative opinion of Louis. Catherine replies Antoine actually speaks little of Louis, and Antoine feels that Louis has little to no interest in their lives, and she openly suspects that belief may have some truth in it. She questions Louis if he knows what Antoine does for a living and explains that he makes tools in a nearby location. Martine also lectures Louis about taking responsibility in the family and says that his status, success, and courage give him some authority. She learns that he has moved from the address where she had been sending his mail, and he had not told her where he currently lives.

Louis expresses interest in seeing the family's former house and cites nostalgia, which bewilders the others, who regard it as a ruin. The family argument that follows puts an end to his wish. He rides with Antoine to the shops for cigarettes and makes small talk, which angers Antoine, who is sick of all the secrecy surrounding Louis's life and the reason that he has returned. He later tells Louis that his former lover Pierre died about a week ago from cancer.

During a meal, Louis promises to visit home more and tells Suzanne she is welcome to visit him. However, it soon becomes apparent Louis is about to leave. Seizing upon this, Antoine tries to remove him from the house and insists on driving him to the airport, and the family shouts back at Antoine for his brutality. Antoine lashes back by saying that he is tired of being treated as the family's freak. After a pause, Louis leaves without having told his family of his prognosis.

== Production ==
=== Development ===
Canadian director Xavier Dolan said that when he originally read Jean-Luc Lagarce's play Juste la fin du monde, he felt "lost," citing its style and the aggressive nature of the characters. He later reread it and said, "One day, I don't know what it was, I pulled it off my shelf and suddenly understood and appreciated this weird and verbose writing style."

Dolan described the extensive work required to adapt the stage play for film:

I tried to keep the idiosyncrasies and the singularity of Lagarce's vernacular as much as I could... The play is verbose, the language nervous, and prolix. The characters correct their own grammar constantly, beating themselves up, rewording their own sentences. I kept all that as is, basically - but evidently had to cut down many monologues in size, and some episodes were of course dropped. What was really reshaped is the structure. The second half of the play is almost entirely abstract. Characters talk to everyone and no one, all on stage, yet in different places... It was very theatrical, I guess, and didn’t provide us with a proper build-up. The climax in the play is only between the lead role and his brother, and is 8 pages long... So I had to recycle bits and pieces from earlier scenes, omitted scenes and scenes I invented from scratch in order to write a second half, and the end.

Dolan denied the film was semi-autobiographical and asserted "I'm not dying. I'm not misunderstood by my family." Star Nathalie Baye said Dolan wrote not only the French dialogue but the English subtitles.

Plans for Dolan to direct a film, titled Juste la fin du monde, with Ulliel, Baye, Cotillard, Léa Seydoux and Vincent Cassel starring, were announced in April 2015. Through support from Telefilm Canada, the film was produced by Sons of Manual's Nancy Grant and Dolan and MK2 Productions's Nathanaël Karmitz along with Sylvain Corbeil. Seville International handled the international sales of the film.

=== Casting ===
Actor	Role
Gaspard Ulliel	Louis
Nathalie Baye	Martine
Vincent Cassel	Antoine
Marion Cotillard	Catherine
Léa Seydoux	Suzanne

In casting the film, Dolan claimed he did not contemplate personally playing Louis, citing the older age of French actor Gaspard Ulliel as possibly giving Louis more dimensions. Ulliel was interested in working with Dolan and attempted to meet with him several times to discuss making a film together. Other choices for actors defied typecasting, as Marion Cotillard was selected to play a shy character.

Baye took the role of Martine, citing Dolan's typical portrayal of mother figures in his films, which she regarded as remarkable. Baye had previously collaborated with Dolan on his 2012 film Laurence Anyways.

=== Filming ===
Principal photography began on 26 May 2015 in Montreal. Scenes were shot in Laval, Quebec, where a set was established in a small and inconspicuous house in the suburbs. Dolan explained that he believed that the story is set in Europe, but he gave it a small Canadian veneer. In the bungalow, the crew set up in the basement, with the Mexican director Guillermo del Toro inspecting the equipment. Cassel reported that sets and lighting were prepared one year before the cast arrived for filming.

Seydoux described her experience working with Dolan as a loving one and said, "It is always a romance. I was very excited when I met Xavier for the first time. For me, he is a real artist. I can say, I am kind of fascinated." Cotillard described her part as challenging and xiredo her character's "flood of incoherences," which was made up of "mostly aborted sentences and redundancies. At first I was terrified by my text and then I understood that her monologues were like the sound of silence." Baye was initially taken aback by the heavy makeup applied to her for her character and took time to adjust. After only five days of filming, shooting was delayed in August 2015 while Seydoux departed to work on the film Spectre.

In selecting his soundtrack, Dolan sought "this sort of happy, sad, nostalgia-filled texture." Hence, he chose "I Miss You" by Blink-182 and "Natural Blues" by Moby. The film was dedicated to the deceased Canadian costume designer François Barbeau.

== Release ==
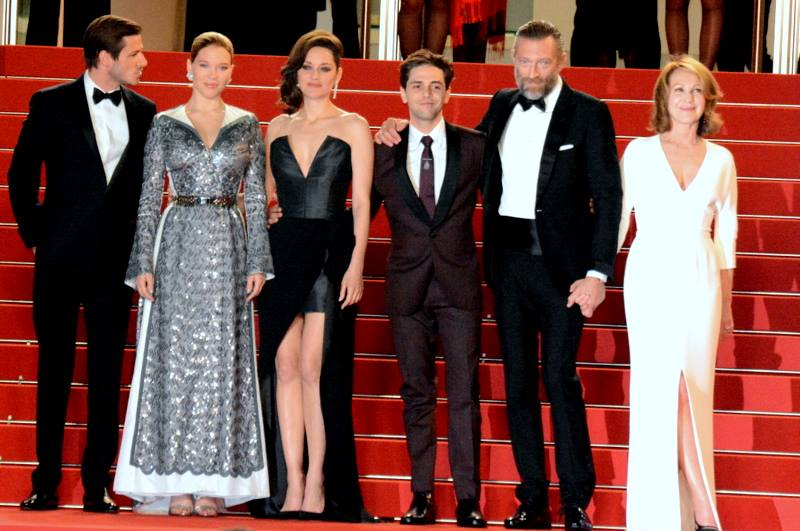
Director and stars at the 2016 Cannes Film Festival.

Plans for Diaphana/MK2 to release the film in France, while Entertainment One and Les Films Seville would distribute the film in Canada, were announced in April 2015. The first image from the film, featuring Cotillard, was released on 13 June 2015. The film had its world premiere at the Cannes Film Festival on 19 May 2016.

It was featured in competition at the Sydney Film Festival in June 2016. The film was also screened at the 2016 Toronto International Film Festival. The film was released in Quebec and France on 21 September 2016, with its Toronto release following on 23 September. In 2017, the film was in competition for the Grand Jury Prize at Italy's Riviera International Film Festival.

In Canada, it was released on DVD and Blu-ray on 7 February 2017. It was released in the United States on 30 June 2017, by Netflix.

== Reception ==
=== Critical response ===
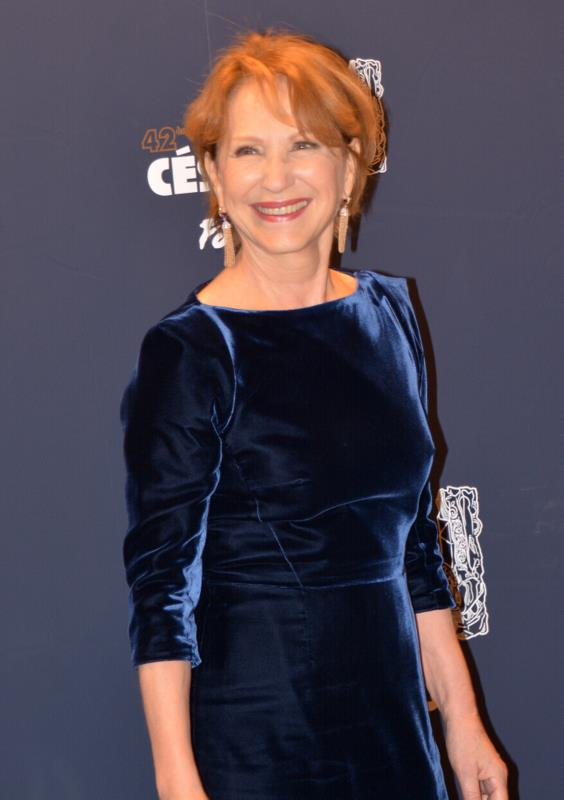
Nathalie Baye at the 42nd César Awards, where she was nominated for Best Supporting Actress.

The film premiered to polarized reactions from festival audiences and critics AlloCiné, a French cinema website, gave the film an average of 3.2/5, based on a survey of 44 French reviews. On review aggregator Rotten Tomatoes, the film holds a 44% approval rating based on 86 reviews, with an average score of 5.5/10. The site's critical consensus reads, "It's Only the End of the World is stocked with talent and boasts a story steeped in conflict, but the end result proves a disappointing misfire from writer-director Xavier Dolan." At Metacritic, which assigns a rating out of 100 to reviews from mainstream critics, the film received a score of 48, based on 11 reviews, indicating "mixed or average reviews".

Vanity Fair calling it "the most disappointing film at Cannes". The Hollywood Reporter called it "a cold and deeply unsatisfying" film and Variety dubbed it "a frequently excruciating dramatic experience". Despite this, the film received positive reviews from critics, including The Guardian calling it a "brilliant, stylised and hallucinatory evocation of family dysfunction". Peter Howell of the Toronto Star wrote the film "deserves more applause than boos" and commended Dolan on his calm response to negative reviews. Cassel also argued the melodrama that some critics derided was appropriate to convey the family's collapse.

In Canada, Marc-André Lussier of La Presse gave the film three and a half stars, commending Gaspard Ulliel for giving one of his best performances and cinematographer André Turpin for superb visuals. T'cha Dunlevy of the Montreal Gazette awarded it four stars, praising Turpin and "Dolan's daring cinematic approach to the subject matter", noting the number of close-ups. On 7 December 2016, the film was named to the Toronto International Film Festival's annual Canada's Top 10 list. In France, Isabelle Regnier wrote in Le Monde that the film far exceeded low expectations, and was one of Dolan's strongest works. Thierry Chèze of L'Express found the ambition admirable, and the film's contrasts to mirror Dolan's. Télérama's Louis Guichard wrote Dolan kept his style with his first all-French cast and a darker story.

=== Box office ===
In France, It's Only the End of the World was released to 391 screens, where it debuted at number one at the box office and sold 1,034,477 tickets. The only three prior Quebec films to surpass one million admissions in France were The Decline of the American Empire (1986), The Barbarian Invasions (2003) and Dolan's 2014 film Mommy. In Quebec, the film grossed $445,132 by 3 October 2016, a respectable performance in Quebec cinema, though not as strong as Mommy.

By 31 October, Les Films Séville reported the film grossed $747,386 in Quebec. By 12 February 2017, Box Office Mojo reported a worldwide gross of $9 million.

=== Accolades ===
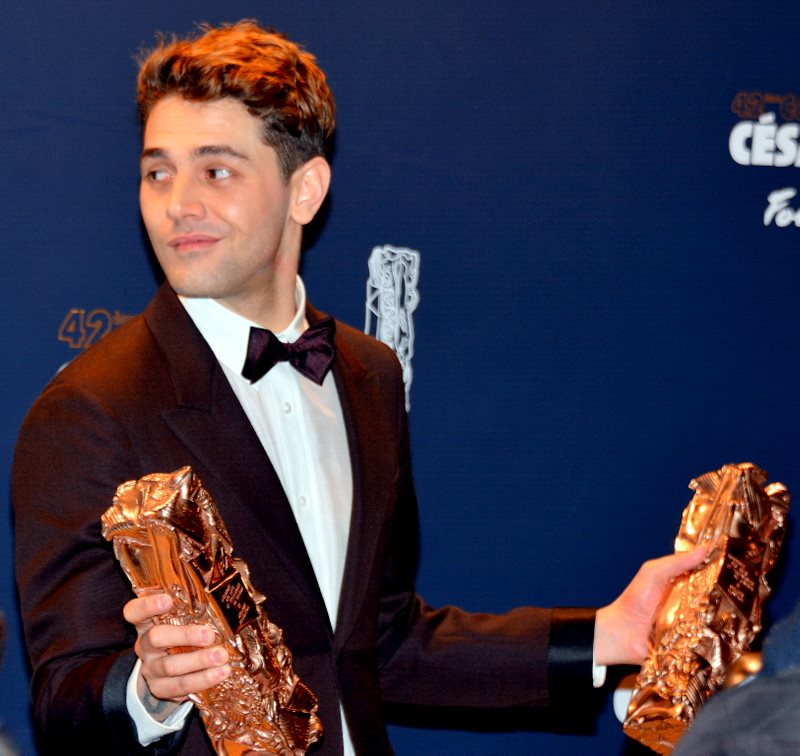
Xavier Dolan collected two César Awards for Best Director and Best Editing.

The film was selected to compete for the Palme d'Or at the 2016 Cannes Film Festival where it won the Grand Prix and the Ecumenical Jury Prize. It became the second Canadian film to win the Grand Prix, after Atom Egoyan's The Sweet Hereafter, and Dolan became the first Quebec filmmaker to win the Grand Prix. The announcement of the awards drew boos from the press, with Dolan emotionally quoting French poet Anatole France in saying, "I prefer the madness of passion to the wisdom of indifference". Canadian Prime Minister Justin Trudeau congratulated Dolan on Twitter, writing "You’ve made us proud again, Xavier".

It's Only the End of the World was selected as the Canadian entry for the Best Foreign Language Film at the 89th Academy Awards. In December 2016, it made the shortlist of nine films to be considered for a nomination, though it was not ultimately nominated. The film received nine nominations for the Canadian Screen Awards and six nominations for France's César Awards. At the César Awards, the three wins tied with Divines for the most honours of the night. It's Only the End of the World was also the major film winner at the Canadian Screen Awards, where producer Sylvain Corbeil read statements by Dolan, who was unable to attend while working on a film in Paris.

Award	Date of ceremony	Category	Recipient(s)	Result	Ref(s)
Canadian Screen Awards	12 March 2017	Best Motion Picture	Nancy Grant, Sylvain Corbeil and Xavier Dolan	Won	
Canadian Screen Awards	12 March 2017	Best Direction	Xavier Dolan	Won	
Canadian Screen Awards	12 March 2017	Best Adapted Screenplay	Xavier Dolan	Won	
Canadian Screen Awards	12 March 2017	Best Supporting Actor	Vincent Cassel	Won	
Canadian Screen Awards	12 March 2017	Best Supporting Actress	Nathalie Baye	Nominated	
Canadian Screen Awards	12 March 2017	Best Cinematography	André Turpin	Won	
Canadian Screen Awards	12 March 2017	Best Make-Up	Maïna Militza and Denis Vidal	Won	
Canadian Screen Awards	12 March 2017	Best Overall Sound	François Grenon	Nominated	
Canadian Screen Awards	12 March 2017	Best Sound Editing	Sylvain Brassard, Guy Francoeur, Benoît Dame and Guy Pelletier	Nominated	
Cannes Film Festival	22 May 2016	Palme d'Or	Xavier Dolan	Nominated	
Cannes Film Festival	22 May 2016	Grand Prix	Xavier Dolan	Won	
Cannes Film Festival	22 May 2016	Ecumenical Jury Prize	Xavier Dolan	Won	
César Awards	24 February 2017	Best Director	Xavier Dolan	Won	
César Awards	24 February 2017	Best Actor	Gaspard Ulliel	Won	
César Awards	24 February 2017	Best Supporting Actor	Vincent Cassel	Nominated	
César Awards	24 February 2017	Best Supporting Actress	Nathalie Baye	Nominated	
César Awards	24 February 2017	Best Editing	Xavier Dolan	Won	
César Awards	24 February 2017	Best Foreign Film	Xavier Dolan	Nominated	
Filmfest Hamburg	29 September – 8 October 2016	Art Cinema Award	Xavier Dolan	Won	
Globes de Cristal Award	30 January 2017	Best Film	Xavier Dolan	Nominated	
Globes de Cristal Award	30 January 2017	Best Actor	Vincent Cassel	Nominated	
Globes de Cristal Award	30 January 2017	Best Actor	Gaspard Ulliel	Nominated	
Globes de Cristal Award	30 January 2017	Best Actress	Marion Cotillard	Nominated	
Lumière Awards	30 January 2017	Best Actor	Gaspard Ulliel	Nominated	
Lumière Awards	30 January 2017	Best Music	Gabriel Yared	Nominated	
Lumière Awards	30 January 2017	Best French-Language Film	Xavier Dolan	Nominated	
Prix collégial du cinéma québécois	2017	Best Film	It's Only the End of the World	Nominated	
Prix Iris	4 June 2017	Best Film	Nancy Grant, Sylvain Corbeil and Xavier Dolan	Won	
Prix Iris	4 June 2017	Best Director	Xavier Dolan	Won	
Prix Iris	4 June 2017	Best Actress	Nathalie Baye	Nominated	
Prix Iris	4 June 2017	Best Actor	Gaspard Ulliel	Nominated	
Prix Iris	4 June 2017	Best Supporting Actress	Marion Cotillard	Nominated	
Prix Iris	4 June 2017	Best Supporting Actress	Léa Seydoux	Nominated	
Prix Iris	4 June 2017	Best Casting	Xavier Dolan	Won	
Prix Iris	4 June 2017	Best Cinematography	André Turpin	Won	
Prix Iris	4 June 2017	Best Makeup	Maïna Militza	Nominated	
Prix Iris	4 June 2017	Best Hairdressing	Denis Vidal	Nominated	
Prix Iris	4 June 2017	Most Successful Film Outside Quebec	Nancy Grant, Sylvain Corbeil and Xavier Dolan	Won	
Prix Iris	4 June 2017	Public Prize	Nancy Grant, Sylvain Corbeil and Xavier Dolan	Nominated	

== See also ==
- List of submissions to the 89th Academy Awards for Best Foreign Language Film
- List of Canadian submissions for the Academy Award for Best Foreign Language Film
