= Mara Zigler =

Mara Zigler is a Canadian costume designer based in Toronto, Ontario, most noted as a five-time Canadian Screen Award nominee for Best Costume Design.

After studying theatre and touring with a puppet theatre company, Zigler worked as a buyer for vintage clothing stores in Toronto's Kensington Market before entering the film industry when a friend invited her to help style a music video. She is known principally for her work on independent film projects by new and emerging directors.

== Filmography ==
- It's No Real Pleasure in Life - 2016
- A Man's Story - 2016
- Sadie's Last Days on Earth - 2016
- The Definites - 2017
- The Neddeaus of Duqesne Island - 2017
- How to Buy a Baby - 2017
- Emmy - 2018
- Mouthpiece - 2018
- Firecrackers - 2018
- American Woman - 2019
- The Afterlifetime of Colm Feore - 2019
- Flood - 2019
- Maggot - 2019
- Succor - 2019
- Sugar Daddy - 2020
- The Boathouse - 2021
- Tenzin - 2021
- Soft - 2022
- So Much Tenderness - 2022
- Something You Said Last Night - 2022
- Others - 2022
- Motherland - 2023
- Measures for a Funeral - 2024
- A Fermenting Woman - 2024
- Matt and Mara - 2024

== Awards ==
Award	Year	Category	Work	Result	Ref.
Canadian Screen Awards	2019	Best Costume Design	Firecrackers	Nominated	
Canadian Screen Awards	2020	Best Costume Design	American Woman	Nominated	
Canadian Screen Awards	2023	Best Costume Design	Tenzin	Nominated	
Canadian Screen Awards	2024	Best Costume Design	Something You Said Last Night	Nominated	
Canadian Screen Awards	2025	Best Costume Design	Matt and Mara	Nominated	
