= Honey Bunch (film) =

2025 film by Madeleine Sims-Fewer and Dusty Mancinelli

- Canadian theatrical release poster
- Directed by: Madeleine Sims-Fewer; Dusty Mancinelli
- Written by: Madeleine Sims-Fewer; Dusty Mancinelli
- Produced by: Becky Yeboah; Madeleine Sims-Fewer; Dusty Mancinelli
- Starring: Grace Glowicki; Ben Petrie; Jason Isaacs; Kate Dickie; India Brown; Patricia Tulasne; Julian Richings
- Cinematography: Adam Crosby
- Edited by: Lev Lewis
- Music by: Andrea Boccadoro
- Production companies: Cat People Films; Rhombus Media; XYZ Films
- Distributed by: Elevation Pictures (Canada); Shudder (United States)
- Release dates: February 18, 2025 (Berlinale); February 13, 2026 (United States)
- Running time: 114 minutes
- Countries: Canada; United States
- Languages: English; French

Honey Bunch is a 2025 horror-thriller film directed and written by Madeleine Sims-Fewer and Dusty Mancinelli. The film stars Grace Glowicki, Ben Petrie, Jason Isaacs, Kate Dickie and India Brown. The film premiered at the 75th Berlin International Film Festival on 18 February 2025 as part of Berlinale Special program.

== Premise ==
The film follows Diana, who wakes from a coma with fragmented memories. Her husband takes her to an experimental trauma centre hidden in the remote wilderness, yet the reason eludes her. As fragments of her memory start to return, so do disturbing and sinister revelations about her marriage.

== Cast ==
- Grace Glowicki as Diana, Homer’s wife
- Ben Petrie as Homer, Diana's husband
- Jason Isaacs as Joseph
- Kate Dickie as Farah
- India Brown as Josephina
- Patricia Tulasne as Dr. Trephine
- Julian Richings as Delwyn

== Production ==
The film is written, directed and produced by Madeleine Sims-Fewer and Dusty Mancinelli and produced by Becky Yeboah in association with Rhombus Media, in participation of Telefilm Canada and Ontario Creates.

The film was wrapped up in August 2024 at the locations of Owen Sound, Ontario, Canada. On August 26, 2024 Rhombus Media announced that the film is in post-production and slated for release next year.

== Release ==
Honey Bunch had its world premiere in the Berlinale Special section of the 75th Berlin International Film Festival on 18 February 2025. It screened in the Centrepiece section of the 2025 Toronto International Film Festival on 10 September 2025. It was part of Late Night Visions at the 2025 Atlantic International Film Festival and screened on September 11, 2025. It was also presented in 'Special Presentations' section at the 2025 Cinéfest Sudbury International Film Festival on 18 September 2025.

It was invited to compete in the International fantastic film competition section of the Strasbourg European Fantastic Film Festival. It screened on 3 October 2025.

On October 5, 2025, it was presented in Altered States section of 2025 Vancouver International Film Festival, and in 'Strands: Cult' section of the 2025 BFI London Film Festival on 10 October 2025. On 13 October, it also competed in the 58th Sitges Film Festival in the 'Oficial Fantàstic Competició' section, vying for the various awards given in the section.

It screened in the Twilight Zone section of the 2025 Stockholm International Film Festival on November 8, 2025, and in the 'Midnight Shivers' at the 29th Tallinn Black Nights Film Festival on the same date. The film was released in the United States on February 13, 2026.

== Reception ==
=== Critical response ===
On the review aggregator website Rotten Tomatoes, 93% of 56 critics' reviews are positive, with an average rating of 7/10. The website's consensus reads: "An inventive horror flick with provocative ideas about fidelity to go along with its unnerving frights, Honey Bunch remains thrillingly unpredictable to the very end." Metacritic, which uses a weighted average, assigned the film a score of 71 out of 100, based on seven critics, indicating "generally favorable" reviews.

Bradley Gibson of Film Threat gave the film a score of 8 out of 10, writing, "We connect with each character and dread what their fate might be, right up to the end credits."

=== Accolades ===
Award / Festival	Date of ceremony	Category	Recipient(s)	Result	Ref.
Strasbourg European Fantastic Film Festival	5 October 2025	Golden Octopus	Honey Bunch	Nominated	
Sitges Film Festival	18 October 2025	Best Feature Film	Honey Bunch	Nominated	
Sitges Film Festival	18 October 2025	Best Special, Visual or Makeup Effects	Tenille Shockey & François Dagenais	Won	
Canadian Screen Awards	2026	Best Lead Performance in a Drama Film	Grace Glowicki	Won	
Canadian Screen Awards	2026	Best Art Direction/Production Design	Joshua Turpin	Nominated	
Canadian Screen Awards	2026	Best Costume Design	Melinda Dempster, Madeleine Sims-Fewer, Heather Hedley	Won	
Canadian Screen Awards	2026	Best Sound Editing	Matthew Chan, Bret Killoran, Gabriella Wallace	Nominated	
Canadian Screen Awards	2026	Best Sound Mixing	Matthew Chan	Nominated	
Canadian Screen Awards	2026	Best Makeup	Niamh McCann, Tenille Shockey, François Dagenais	Nominated	
Canadian Screen Awards	2026	Best Hair	Sava Zeranska	Won	
Canadian Screen Awards	2026	Best Stunt Coordination	Chris Mark, Carl Fortin	Nominated	
