= Jean-Luc Lagarce =

French actor, theatre director and playwright

- Born: 14 February 1957; Héricourt, Haute-Saône, France
- Died: 30 September 1995 (aged 38); 14th arrondissement, Paris
- Occupations: playwright, theatre director
- Writing career
- Period: 1970s-1990s
- Notable work: Juste la fin du monde

Jean-Luc Lagarce (French pronunciation: [ʒɑ̃ lyk laɡaʁs]; 14 February 1957 – 30 September 1995) was a French actor, theatre director and playwright. Although only moderately successful during his lifetime, since his death he has become one of the most widely-produced contemporary French playwrights.

Born in Héricourt, Haute-Saône, he was educated at the Université de Besançon. He was a cofounder of the Théâtre de La Roulotte in 1978, directing productions of playwrights such as Pierre de Marivaux, Eugène Marin Labiche and Eugène Ionesco before beginning to stage his own plays. Some of his early plays were criticized as derivative of Ionesco or Samuel Beckett. Although some of his plays were published by Théâtre Ouvert or recorded as radio dramas, only a few of them were ever staged during his lifetime.

Publishing 25 plays during his lifetime, he died of AIDS in 1995. He also published a volume of short stories, wrote an opera libretto and a film screenplay, and cofounded the publishing company Les Solitaires intempestifs. He was rediscovered by critics after his death, becoming more widely recognized as one of the most important modern French playwrights. This led to many productions overseas, such as the Brazilian version of Music-Hall by Luiz Päetow, which won the Theatre Shell Award in 2010.

In 2015, film director Xavier Dolan adapted Lagarce's Juste la fin du monde into the film It's Only the End of the World, which won the Grand Prix and the Ecumenical Jury Prize at the 2016 Cannes Film Festival. Le pays lointain was produced at theatre Odeon, Paris in 2019.

== Works ==
=== Plays ===
- La bonne de chez Ducatel, 1977
- Erreur de construction, 1977
- Carthage, encore, 1978
- La Place de l'autre , 1979
- Voyage de Madame Knipper vers la Prusse Orientale, 1980
- Ici ou ailleurs, 1981
- Les Serviteurs, 1981
- Noce, 1982
- Vagues souvenirs de l'année de la peste, 1982
- Hollywood, 1983
- Histoire d'amour (repérages), 1983
- Retour à la citadelle, 1984
- Les Orphelins, 1984
- De Saxe, roman, 1985
- La Photographie, 1986
- Derniers remords avant l'oubli, 1987
- Les Solitaires intempestifs, 1987
- Music-hall, 1988
- Les Prétendants, 1989
- Juste la fin du monde, 1990
- Histoire d'amour (derniers chapitres), 1990
- Les règles du savoir-vivre dans la société moderne, 1993
- Nous, les héros, 1993
- Nous, les héros (version sans le père), 1993
- J'étais dans ma maison et j'attendais que la pluie vienne, 1994
- Le Pays lointain, 1995

=== Prose ===
- Trois récits, 1994, a collection of three short stories

=== Other fiction ===
- Quichotte, 1989, libretto for a jazz opera by Mike Westbrook
- Retour à l'automne, screenplay cowritten with Gérard Bouysse

=== Non-fiction ===
- Théâtre et Pouvoir en Occident, a study of how dramatists have contended with political power, from Ancient Greece to the middle of the twentieth century
- Journal, volume 1: 1977–1990, volume 2: 1990–1995
