= For Nonna Anna =

- Film poster
- Directed by: Luis De Filippis
- Written by: Luis De Filippis
- Produced by: Luis De Filippis; Nava Rastegar; Lucah Rosenberg-Lee
- Starring: Maya Henry; Jacqueline Tarne
- Cinematography: Kelly Jeffrey
- Edited by: Kristy Neville
- Release date: September 9, 2017 (TIFF)
- Running time: 13 minutes
- Country: Canada
- Languages: English; Italian

For Nonna Anna is a Canadian short drama film, directed by Luis De Filippis and released in 2017. The film stars Maya Henry as Chris, a young transgender woman caring for her ailing Italian grandmother Anna (Jacqueline Tarne).

According to De Filippis, the film was inspired by a desire to avoid the sensationalized aspects of many transgender-themed media representations, by writing a film in which the process of gender transition was not the driving narrative conflict.

The film premiered at the 2017 Toronto International Film Festival. It was subsequently screened at the 2018 Sundance Film Festival, where it won a Special Jury Award, and at the 2018 Inside Out Film and Video Festival, where De Filippis won the Emerging Canadian Artist award.

At the 7th Canadian Screen Awards in 2019, the film was shortlisted for Best Live Action Short Drama.
