= Heather Hedley (costume designer) =

Canadian costume designer

Heather Hedley is a Canadian costume designer. She is most noted for her work on the film Honey Bunch, for which she, Madeleine Sims-Fewer and Melinda Dempster won the Canadian Screen Award for Best Costume Design at the 14th Canadian Screen Awards in 2026.
