= Dusty Mancinelli =

Canadian film director

Dusty Mancinelli is a Canadian independent filmmaker from Toronto, Ontario, Canada. Several of his films have been shown at the Toronto International Film Festival (TIFF) and other notable film festivals worldwide, winning numerous awards. Since 2017, he has collaborated with Madeleine Sims-Fewer. Their debut feature film Violation was shown at the 2020 Toronto International Film Festival and 2021 Sundance Film Festival.

== Career ==
Mancinelli is a graduate of York University in Toronto. After graduating, Mancinelli worked for five years with Canadian filmmaker Deepa Mehta from 2007 to 2011. Mancinelli worked on Mehta's Heaven on Earth and Midnight's Children feature films. In 2016, Mehta named Mancinelli as an up and coming Canadian director to watch.

Mancinelli and partner Harry Cherniak founded the film company Inflo Films in Toronto while at York. Their first short Death to Charlie premiered in 2006. In 2007, they produced their second short P.U.R.E., a sci-fi fantasy about "Particularly Uncommon Rain Events" which won several awards and played at several film festivals, including Cinéfest Sudbury, Whistler and the Washington DC Independent Film Festival. In 2009, Mancinelli directed the short film Soap, which was selected for TIFF. Soap, about a cheating spouse's cover-up of the sudden death of her "boy toy" after a slip on a bar of soap, was reviewed as "formulaic" and its 80s setting as only "a gimmick." His next short, Pathways. was also shown at TIFF, in 2011. About a boy who has a life-changing experience when he discovers an unconscious man with a gun and briefcase in the forest, Mancinelli revealed in interview, that he identified with the boy, sharing experiences with having been bullied as a child. His next short film, Broken Heart Syndrome, a drama/comedy, was premiered at TIFF in 2012. After a traumatic break-up, a man is diagnosed with the rare and potentially fatal Broken Heart Syndrome and has to find a cure desperately. Its inspiration came after Mancinelli has a breakup and learned about the actual condition. His next short, Winter Hymns, premiered at the Vancouver Film Festival, won the Golden Egg directing award at the 2015 Reykjavik International Film Festival. It was selected by the Slamdance Film Festival, where it won the Jury Award for Narrative Short, qualifying for Academy Award consideration. In 2016, Mancinelli and Cherniak produced The Big Crunch about a youth's existential crisis, partially funded by the BravoFACT film subsidy program. The film, described as a "mixture of music, special effects, voiceover and on-screen performance" made its debut at the 2016 Atlantic Film Festival in Halifax, followed by showings at the Edmonton International Film Festival. Mancinelli also wrote the screenplay for Little Kings, produced by Cherniak.

=== Mancinelli and Sims-Fewer collaborations ===
In 2015, Mancinelli met Madeleine Sims-Fewer at the 2015 TIFF Talent Lab. Since 2017, the pair has co-directed several films in their DM Films joint venture. Their films have been shown at TIFF, BFI London Film Festival, Vancouver International Film Festival, the Moscow International Film Festival, Telluride Film Festival and Slamdance Film Festival, among others. Their first collaboration, Slap Happy, about a tempestuous relationship, was an official selection at the BFI London Film Festival, Vancouver and Slamdance. Reviewer Ben Robins named it one of the best short films at the BFI Festival, describing it as "like a little less touched-up Blue Valentine, with a much more twisted sense of humour." Their second collaboration was Woman in Stall, a "claustrophobic thriller" about an encounter in a public restroom between a man and a woman trapped in a cubicle. It won the Short Film Grand Jury Prize at the Slamdance festival. Chubby, their third collaboration, was shown at the 2019 Telluride Film Festival and 2020 Slamdance festival. A study of a 10-year-old's experience with sexual abuse, it was described as "harrowing" and would "stay with you long after its credits roll".

==== Violation ====
A teaser of their debut feature Violation was shown at the Cannes Marché du Film Online in June 2020. Violation, which is described as "decidedly dark, potentially dangerous and probably deranged" and "flips the revenge genre on its head", was selected for the "Fantastic 7" genre festival initiative to highlight genre films at seven international film festivals. Violation premiered at the 2020 Toronto International Film Festival in the "Midnight Madness" program. Critic Mike Crisolago has named it one of 30 films he is already "excited to see.". Now Toronto critic Norman Wilner called it "a major levelling up of their signature combination of rage and intensity". According to Variety reviewer Tomris Laffley, "Despite some heavy-handed choices, Madeleine Sims-Fewer and Dusty Mancinelli pack a profound gut-punch with their debut feature."

Mancinelli received a Canadian Screen Award nomination at the 9th Canadian Screen Awards in 2021, for the John Dunning Best First Feature Award.

=== Other ===
Mancinelli is also a faculty member of the Toronto Film School. Mancinelli received his BFA in film production from York University and is an alumnus of the National Screen Institute's Features First program.

== Filmography ==
Year	Film	Genre
2006	Death to Charlie	narrative short
2007	P.U.R.E.	narrative short
2009	Soap	narrative short
2011	Pathways	narrative short
2012	Broken Heart Syndrome	narrative short
2015	Winter Hymns	narrative short
2016	The Big Crunch	narrative short
2017	Slap Happy	narrative short
2017	Detroit Blood	documentary short
2018	Woman in Stall	narrative short
2019	Chubby	narrative short
2020	Violation	horror feature
2025	Honey Bunch	thriller feature

== Recognition ==
- Winter Hymns - world premiere at the Vancouver International Film Festival, screened at more than 25 film festivals
  - Golden Egg Award at the Reykjavík International Film Festival
  - Grand Jury Award for Narrative Shorts at the Slamdance Film Festival
  - Best Short, Best Director and Best Cast at Canadian Film Festival
- Slap Happy - official selection at 12 film festivals, premiered at Montreal World Film Festival
- Woman in Stall - official selection of 14 film festivals world-wide
  - Winner, Narrative Shorts Grand Jury Prize, Slamdance Film Festival, 2019
  - Nominee, Golden Sheaf, Best Student Film, Yorkton Film Festival, 2019
  - Winner, Narrative Student Short Jury Award, Austin Film Festival, 2018
- Chubby - official selection at nine festivals, premiered at Telluride Film Festival
  - Winner, Silver Dragon Award for Best Director, Fiction Film Kraków Film Festival 2019
