= Nicoletta Massone =

Canadian film and television costume designer

Nicoletta Massone is a Canadian film and television costume designer.

She is a two-time Genie Award winner for Best Costume Design, winning at the 16th Genie Awards in 1996 for Margaret's Museum and at the 31st Genie Awards in 2011 for Barney's Version, and was a nominee at the 22nd Genie Awards in 2002 for Varian's War. In television, she won an Emmy Award in 1994 for Zelda, and a Gemini Award in 1999 for Big Bear.

She received a lifetime achievement award from the Prix Gémeaux in 2012.
