= François Barbeau =

- Born: 27 July 1935
- Died: 28 January 2016 (aged 80)
- Occupation: Costume designer
- Awards: Order of Canada

François Barbeau (July 27, 1935 – January 28, 2016) was a Canadian costume designer. He was a professor at the National Theatre School of Canada and the Université du Québec à Montréal who worked on over 700 productions in Quebec and around the world. Barbeau was considered a pioneer in Canadian theatrical costume design, helping to establish distinctly Canadian aesthetic approaches in theatre and film costume work during the Quiet Revolution era.

After taking sewing in high school, he began his career in the 1950s at the theatre The Caravan of Paul Buissonneau. He afterwards worked as a designer at the Théâtre du Rideau Vert. Among the films he worked on are Léolo (1992), for which he won the Genie Award for Best Costume Design, and Laurence Anyways (2012), sharing the Genie with Xavier Dolan. In film, Barbeau mentored fellow-costume designer and Genie winner Louise Jobin.

In 1996, he received the Governor General's Award, and in 2000 he joined the Order of Canada. He died on January 28, 2016. Dolan's 2016 film It's Only the End of the World is dedicated to him.
