= Mary E. McLeod =

Costume designer

Mary E. McLeod is a costume designer. She is known for her costume work on the films Fido (2006), A Christmas Story (1983) and The Boondock Saints (1999). She was nominated for a Genie Award for Best Achievement in Costume Design at the 5th and 28th Genie Awards.

== Early life and education ==
McLeod attended George Brown college and the Ontario College of Art, where she studied drawing and visual communication. While in school, she received a grant to write and produce an educational film on the subject of teenage sexuality.

== Career ==
After graduating, McLeod drew upon her background in figure skating and was hired as head writer for the Canadian television variety show Stars on Ice.

She began her film costume design career with 1982 Porky's, followed shortly by Porky's II: The Next Day.

In 1984, McLeod was nominated for the Genie Award for Best Achievement in Costume Design for her work on A Christmas Story. In 1994, she designed costumes for the film Trapped in Paradise starring Nicholas Cage and the 1995 TV movie adaptation of Bye Bye Birdie.

Her costume design work on the 2006 film Fido earned praise for its retro style. She was nominated for the Genie Award for Best Achievement in Costume Design, though the award ultimately went to Carlo Poggioli and Kazuko Kurosawa for Silk.

She worked on Resident Evil: Apocalypse (2004), Drive Angry (2011), and Chris Brinker's 2014 film Bad Country. In 2017, she won the Leo Award for Best Costume Design of a Television Movie for her work on Toni Braxton: Unbreak My Heart.

In television, she was costume designer on Palace Guard, Deadly Matrimony, Guilty Hearts, and He's Fired, She's Hired.

== Awards ==
Year	Award	Work	Result	Ref
1984	Genie Award for Best Achievement in Costume Design	A Christmas Story	Nominated	
2007	Genie Award for Best Achievement in Costume Design	Fido	Nominated	
2017	Leo Award for Best Costume Design of a Television Movie	Toni Braxton: Unbreak My Heart	Won	
