= Francis-William Rhéaume =

Canadian actor and artist

Francis-William Rhéaume is a Canadian actor and artist from Quebec. He is most noted for his performance as Xavier in the film The Nature of Love (Simple comme Sylvain), for which he received a Prix Iris nomination for Best Supporting Actor at the 26th Quebec Cinema Awards in 2024.

He has also appeared in the films The Mirage (Le Mirage), The Guide to the Perfect Family (La Guide de la famille parfaite) and 1995, and in supporting or guest roles in the television series 19-2, Au secours de Béatrice, Lâcher prise and Mégantic.
