= A Taste of Ink =

- Compte tes blessures
- Directed by: Morgan Simon
- Written by: Morgan Simon
- Produced by: Jean-Christophe Reymond; Amaury Ovise
- Starring: Kévin Azaïs; Monia Chokri; Nathan Willcocks
- Cinematography: Julien Poupard
- Edited by: Marie Loustalot
- Music by: Julien Krug; Selim Aymard
- Production company: Kazak Productions
- Distributed by: Rezo Films
- Release dates: September 12, 2016 (San Sebastián); January 25, 2017 (France)
- Running time: 80 minutes
- Country: France
- Language: French

A Taste of Ink is a 2016 French drama film and the directorial debut of Morgan Simon. The film stars Kévin Azaïs, Monia Chokri and Nathan Willcocks. It premiered in the New Directors section at the 2016 San Sebastián International Film Festival and was awarded by a special mention of the jury.

== Plot ==
Vincent, 24, is the charismatic singer of a hardcore band and has already tattooed over half his body. With his angelic features and piercing gaze, he's got the world in his hands. But when a new woman enters his father's life, old tensions are inflamed. Vincent can no longer keep his anger and desire in check.

== Cast ==
- Kévin Azaïs as Vincent
- Monia Chokri as Julia
- Nathan Willcocks as Hervé
- Julien Krug as Matthew
- Selim Aymard as Zachary
- Cédric Laban as Ruddy

== Festivals ==
A Taste of Ink has been selected to fifty festivals, including San Sebastián, Toronto, Rotterdam, Shanghai, Stockholm, Los Angeles, Zurich, Zagreb, Jerusalem, Bordeaux, and Guadalajara. It received fifteen awards.

== Awards ==
- 2014 : Special mention of the jury at Grand prix Sopadin best screenwriter junior prize
- 2016 : Special mention of the jury at San Sebastián International Film Festival, New Directors section
- 2016 : Best actor award for Kévin Azaïs at Stockholm International Film Festival
- 2016 : Best actor award for Kévin Azaïs and Youth award at Saint-Jean-de-Luz Film Festival
- 2016 : Best director award and Youth award at Tofifest Film Festival
- 2016 : Franco-German Youth award at Internationales Filmfest Braunschweig
- 2017 : CCAS Award at Angers Film Festival Premiers Plans
- 2017 : Best actor award for Kévin Azaïs at Aubagne International Film Festival international
- 2017 : Special jury award and Youth award at Lecce European Film Festival
- 2017 : Best film award at Fiuggi Film Festival
- 2017 : Audience award at Katowice Film festival
- 2017 : TV5 Monde audience award at French Film Festival of Romania

== Nomination ==
- 2017 : nominated by the French critics to the Louis Delluc Prize of the best first feature film.

== Production ==
A Taste of Ink was developed at L'Atelier de la Cinéfondation during Cannes Film Festival 2015 and The Jerusalem International Film Lab.

A music video for the American post-hardcore band Being As An Ocean includes unused footage from the movie. It was shot ten days after November 2015 Paris attacks and is dedicated to all the victims. It is a live music video for the song This Loneliness Won't Be The Death Of Me.

The French title "Compte tes blessures" is inspired by the first album of the British band Bring Me The Horizon, Count Your Blessings. In the movie, the main character wears a black Chicago Bulls Michael Jordan jersey which is Oliver Sykes' emblematic outfit. The character who is also a post-hardcore singer has these words tattooed on his chest as a tribute to the band.
