= Something You Said Last Night =

2022 Canadian film directed by Luis De Filippis

- Film poster
- Directed by: Luis De Filippis
- Written by: Luis De Filippis
- Produced by: Jessica Adams; Harry Cherniak; Luis De Filippis; Michael Graf; Michela Pini; Rhea Plangg
- Starring: Carmen Madonia; Ramona Milano; Paige Evans; Joe Parro
- Cinematography: Norm Li
- Edited by: Noemi Katharina Preiswerk
- Music by: Ella Van Der Woude
- Production companies: JA Productions; Cinédokké
- Distributed by: Elevation Pictures
- Release date: September 10, 2022 (TIFF)
- Running time: 96 minutes
- Countries: Canada; Switzerland
- Languages: English; Italian

Something You Said Last Night is a 2022 Canadian-Swiss drama film, written and directed by Luis De Filippis. The films stars Carmen Madonia as Ren, a young transgender woman in her mid 20s who accompanies her family on a vacation, during which she is torn between her desire to establish her independence and the comfort of retreating back into being taken care of by other people.

The film's cast also includes Ramona Milano, Paige Evans, Joe Parro, Xxavier Woon-A-Tai, Augustus Oicle, Drew Catherine, Mark Winnick, Mark Soltermann and Nate Colitto.

The film had its world premiere in the Discovery section at the 2022 Toronto International Film Festival on September 10, 2022. It was also selected for the 70th San Sebastián International Film Festival's 'New Directors' competitive slate. It entered commercial release in July 2023.

== Critical response ==
Barbara Goslawski of That Shelf positively reviewed the film, praising De Filippis for writing a film about a transgender character whose story centred on normal human relationships instead of trauma over her gender identity, and writing that Madonia's performance as Ren is "a marvel".

Mel Woods of Xtra Magazine praised the film as a major breakthrough for transgender representation in film, writing that "What’s so revolutionary about Something You Said Last Night is its absence. It is absent of trauma, of coming-outs, or of any of the clichés found in so many depictions of trans people on screen. Instead, it is a quietly small film about a family, their dynamic relationships with each other and what it means to care for one another."

The film was rated an A− on Indiewire and subsequently highlighted as a Critic’s Choice by Jude Dry.

The film was named to TIFF's annual year-end Canada's Top Ten list for 2022.

== Awards ==
At TIFF, the film was the winner of the Changemaker Award.

The film also received the Sebastiane award at the San Sebastián Film Festival, the Youth Jury Prize at IFFR, and the Outfest Grand Jury Prize.

The film was shortlisted for the Directors Guild of Canada's 2022 Jean-Marc Vallée DGC Discovery Award. It received two Canadian Screen Award nominations at the 12th Canadian Screen Awards in 2024, for Best Costume Design (Mara Zigler) and the John Dunning Best First Feature Award (De Filippis).
