= Hanna Puley =

Canadian production and costume designer

Hanna Puley is a Canadian production and costume designer for theatre and film, most noted as winner of the Canadian Screen Award for Best Costume Design at the 11th Canadian Screen Awards in 2023 for her work on the film Brother, the 12th Canadian Screen Awards in 2024 for BlackBerry, and as a Best Television Costume Design nominee at the 14th Canadian Screen Awards for the Crave original television series Heated Rivalry.

She was previously nominated in the same category at the 7th Canadian Screen Awards in 2019 for Octavio Is Dead!.

Her other credits have included the films She Stoops to Conquer, Run This Town, and The Swearing Jar, the television series Nirvanna the Band the Show and Heated Rivalry, and the web series Space Riders: Division Earth and Ghost BFF.
