= Magalie Lépine-Blondeau =

Canadian actress and television host (born 1982)

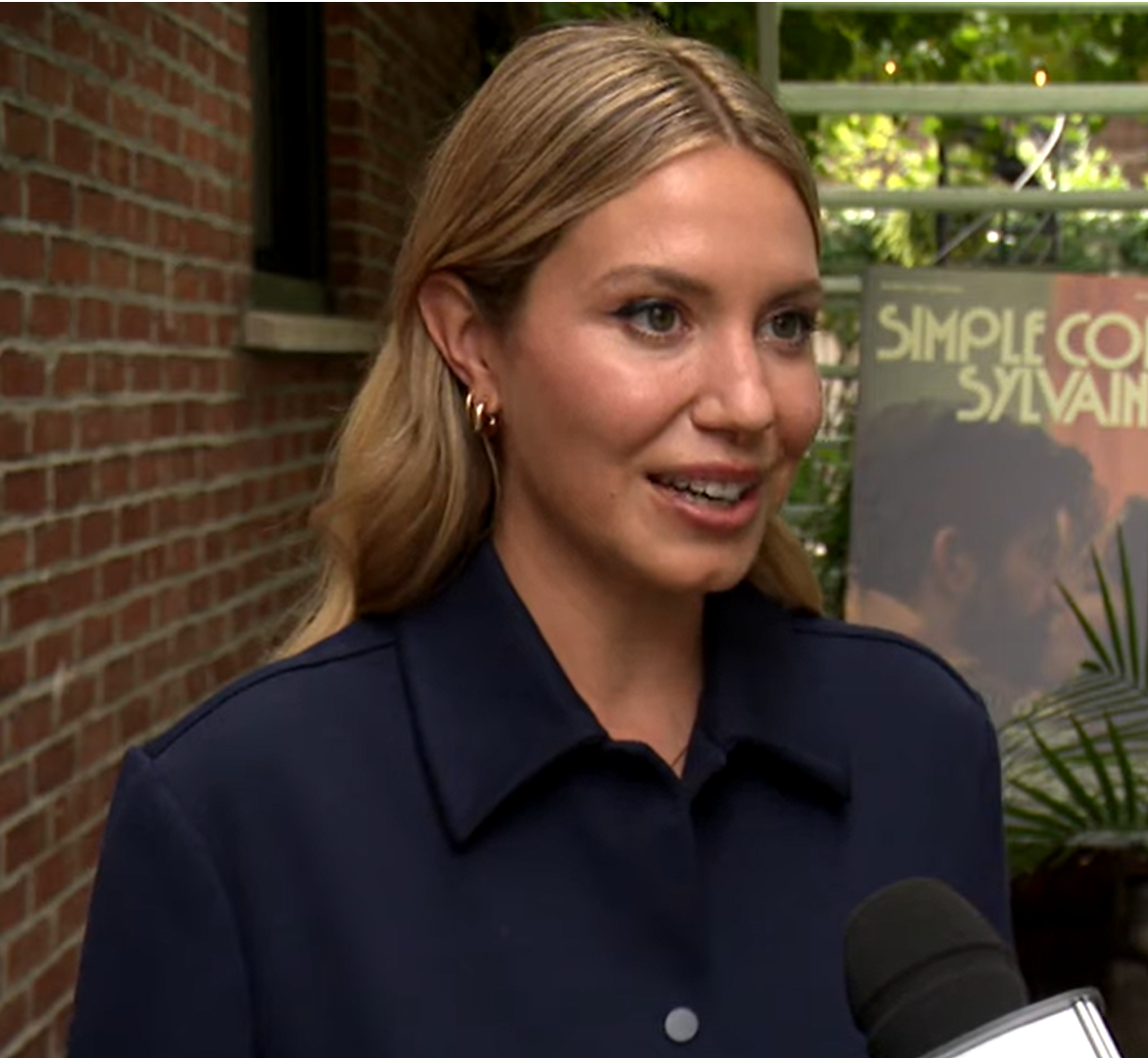
- Born: August 19, 1982 (age 43); Quebec, Canada
- Notable work: Laurence Anyways, 19-2, District 31, Plan B, Boomerang
- Title: Actress, animator, television host

Magalie Lépine-Blondeau (born August 18, 1982) is a Canadian actress and television host.

== Biography ==
Magalie Lépine-Blondeau studied theater at Cégep de Saint-Laurent, then at The National Theater School of Canada. After she obtained her degree, she made many appearances on television, cinema, and theater. She dubs characters in hundreds of films and series. She also lends her voice to Tamara Hope.

In theater, she regularly works with the director Serge Denoncourt. Under his direction, she has notably acted as Madame de Tourvel in Les Liaisons dangereuses and Roxane in Cyrano de Bergerac. She also participated in the creation of Christine, la reine-garçon, by Michel Marc Bouchard.

Since September 2015, she has hosted the show Partir autrement on TV5.

She achieved great success in 2016 in District 31 when she acted as the lieutenant detective, Nadine Legrand. However, her character died in a motorcycle accident in only the second season of the series.

On October 7, 2015, the site Hollywood PQ announced that she was in a relationship with the comedian Louis-José Houde. They separated in 2019. She remains very secretive about her relationships and does not appear in public with her partners.

In 2018, she appeared in the Canadian TV series Letterkenny as recurring character Marie-Frédérique. She was a love interest to the main character Wayne for two seasons.

In 2024 she received a Canadian Screen Award nomination for Best Lead Performance in a Comedy Film at the 12th Canadian Screen Awards, for her role in the film The Nature of Love (Simple comme Sylvain).

== Theater ==
- 2003: Antiviol: The girl
- 2004: Orphée aux enfers: Eurydice
- 2005: Quelques États américains: Multiple Roles
- 2005: L'Amour médecin: Lisette
- 2006: Une année sans été: Mademoiselle Point
- 2007: Dom Juan: Mathurine
- 2007: Les Fourberies de Scapin: Hyacinte and musician
- 2007–2008: Comment j'ai appris à conduire: Greek and teenage choir
- 2010–2011: Il Campiello: Lucietta
- 2011: Ostiguy et fils: Louise
- 2011–2012: Ana: Ana
- 2012: Christine, la reine garçon: Ebba Spare
- 2013: Le Diable rouge: Marie Mancini
- 2014: Les Liaisons dangereuses: Mme de Tourvel
- 2014: Cyrano de Bergerac: Roxane
- 2015: Un show nommé Désir, d'après Un tramway nommé Désir de Tennessee Williams: Stella
- 2019: Électre: Électre
- 2019: La nuit où Laurier-Gaudreault s’est réveillé: Chantal

== Filmography ==
=== Cinema ===
- 2005: A Family Secret (Le Secret de ma mère): Fleurette
- 2006: My Aunt Aline (Ma tante Aline): Stéphanie
- 2009: Heartbeats (Les Amours imaginaires): Unknown young woman
- 2011: The Bossé Empire (L'Empire Bo$$é): Simone
- 2011: Laurence Anyways: Charlotte
- 2013: An Extraordinary Person (Quelqu'un d'extraordinaire): Sarah
- 2014: An Eye for Beauty (Le Règne de la beauté): Karine
- 2014: Love Project (Love Projet): Louise
- 2016: 9 (9, le film): Viviane
- 2019: A Brother's Love (La Femme de mon frère): Annabelle Lajoie
- 2019: Thanks for Everything (Merci pour tout)
- 2019: Restless River (La rivière sans repos)
- 2023: The Nature of Love (Simple comme Sylvain)
- 2025: Fanny

=== Television ===
- 2005: Providence: Sabrina Major
- 2005: Smash 2: Assistant of journalist
- 2006–2007: R-Force: Animator
- 2007–2008: Les Étoiles filantes: Annie Brière
- 2008: C.A.: Mylène
- 2008–2009: Soirée pyjama pour estime de soi Dove: Host
- 2008–2010: Dieu merci!: House comedian
- 2008–2010: Fan Club: Host
- 2009: Colocs.tv: Mélanie
- 2010–2015: 19-2: Amélie de Granpré
- 2012: Tu m'aimes-tu ?: Mélanie
- 2013: Ces gars-là: Mélanie
- 2014: Mensonges: Julia Loman
- Depuis 2015: Boomerang: Stéphanie Bernier
- 2015: Partir autrement: Host
- 2016–2017: District 31: Nadine Legrand, lieutenant-detective (133 episodes)
- 2017: Plan B: Évelyne Lalonde (6 episodes)
- 2018: En audition avec Simon: Herself
- 2018: Letterkenny: Marie-Frédérique aka Marie-Fred
- 2019: Appelle-moi si tu meurs: Crystel Simard
- 2021-present: Sans rendez-vous: Sarah Lenoir
- 2022: The Night Logan Woke Up (La nuit où Laurier Gaudreault s'est réveillé): Chantal Gladu

=== Web ===
- Fourchette: Juliette

== Distinctions ==
=== Awards ===
- Prix Gémeaux 2018 : Best female lead drama series for Plan B
- Prix Artis 2018 : Female Personality of the Year
- Prix Artis 2018 : Best female role in an annual drama series for Nadine Legrand in District 31
- Prix Gémeaux 2011 : Best Youth Animation for Fan Club with Yan England

=== Nominations ===
- Prix Gémeaux 2007 : Best youth animation for R-Force
- Prix Gémeaux 2008 : Best youth animation for R-Force with Marianne Moisan and Antoine Mongrain
- Prix Gémeaux 2009 : Best youth animation for Fan Club with Yan England
- Prix Artis 2010 : Youth Broadcasting Artist for Fan Club with Yan England
- Prix Gémeaux 2017 : Best female support role comedy for Boomerang
- Prix Gémeaux 2018 : Best Female Role in Annual Drama Series for District 31
- Prix Gémeaux 2018 : Best comedy performance for The SNL of Magalie Lépine-Blondeau
- Prix Gémeaux 2018 : Best animation for The SNL of Magalie Lépine-Blondeau
- Prix Gémeaux 2018 : Best Female Role in Seasonal Drama Series for Plan B
- Prix Gémeaux 2018: Best female support role: comedy for Boomerang
