= Mégantic (TV series) =

2023 Canadian television series

Mégantic is a Canadian television drama limited series, which premiered February 9, 2023, on Club Illico. Directed by Alexis Durand-Brault and written by Sylvain Guy, the eight-episode series centres on the Lac-Mégantic rail disaster of 2013, exploring the impact of the disaster with each episode centred principally around the story of an individual person or family. The series was based on personal testimonies from residents of Lac-Mégantic about the impact of the disaster, with some characters based closely on a real individual while others are composites of multiple stories; according to Durand-Brault, the creators actually used only about 10 to 15 percent of what they had learned from talking to the residents.

The cast includes Lauren Hartley, Olivier Gervais-Courchesne, Catherine Paquin-Béchard, Joakim Robillard, Bruno Marcil, Éric Robidoux, Fred Eric Salvail, Isabelle Guérard, Julie Trépanier, Jean-Philippe Perras, Karl Farah, Simon Lacroix, Duane Murray, Julie Ringuette, Luc Senay, Francis-William Rhéaume and Carla Turcotte.

Key stories in the series include those of Gabrielle (Hartley), a young singer-songwriter performing a show at the Musi-Café; Vincent (Marcil) and Daniel (Robidoux) Lamarre, brothers who rush into action with equipment from their construction company to help prevent the disaster from becoming even worse despite already knowing that some of their own family are likely among the dead; Bryan (Robillard), a volunteer firefighter who struggles to cope with his emotional trauma after the incident; Rémi (Lacroix), a priest whom many residents of the community turn to for spiritual guidance following the disaster; and Tim Richards (Murray), the engineer who parked the train at Nantes before its brakes released and it began to roll downhill toward Lac-Mégantic.

In advance of its premiere, the series received a special public screening for residents of Lac-Mégantic. Opinion in the community was mixed, with some residents praising its sensitive handling of the material, while others felt it was still too soon to depict the community's ongoing grief on screen. The local public health authority had counsellors on site at the screening in case attendees had extreme emotional reactions.
