= Marin Karmitz =

Romanian-French businessman

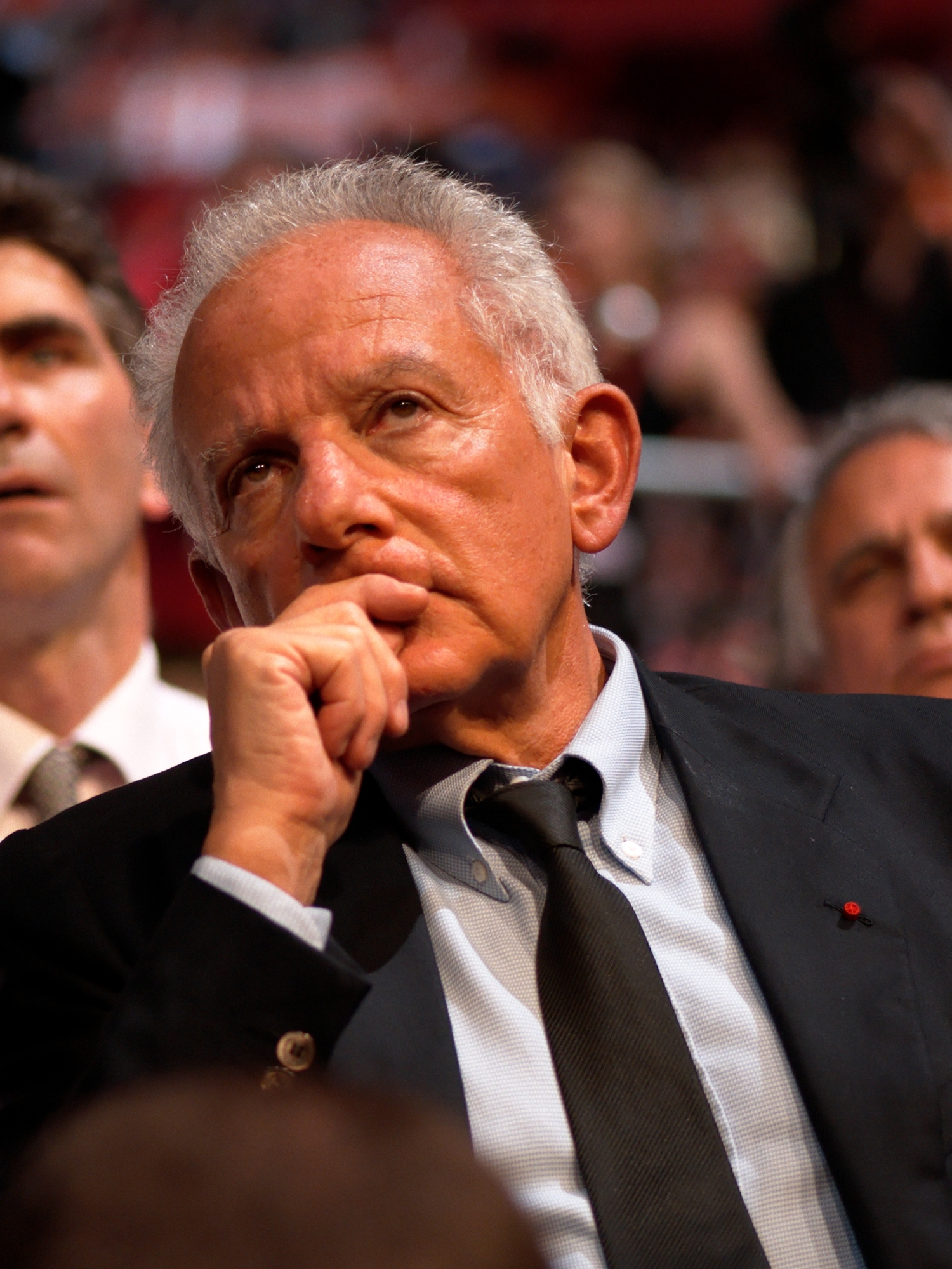
- Karmitz in 2007.
- Born: Bucharest, Romania
- Education: Institut des hautes études cinématographiques
- Occupations: Film producer, film distributor, film exhibitor, director
- Children: Elisha Karmitz; Nathanaël Karmitz

Marin Karmitz is a Romanian-French businessman whose career has spanned the French film industry, including director, producer, film distributor, and operator of a chain of cinemas.

He has worked as a producer for prominent filmmakers such as Krzysztof Kieślowski, Abbas Kiarostami, Michael Haneke, Arturo Ripstein, Agnès Varda, Jean-Luc Godard, Claire Denis, among others.

He comes from a Jewish-Romanian family and emigrated to France in 1948. Karmitz attended film school at IDHEC (renamed La Fémis) and worked as a director of photography after graduating.

Karmitz founded MK2, a production company and movie theater chain, which has specialized in creating, distributing, and screening independent or "auteurist" cinema, including short films.

In 2005, he turned over leadership of the MK2 company and its theaters to his sons Nathanaël (chairman/CEO) and Elisha (general manager).

== Exhibitions ==
- 2010: "Un parcours dans la collection de Marin Karmitz", exhibited at Rencontres d'Arles festival, France.
