= Marlowe Granados =

Canadian writer and filmmaker

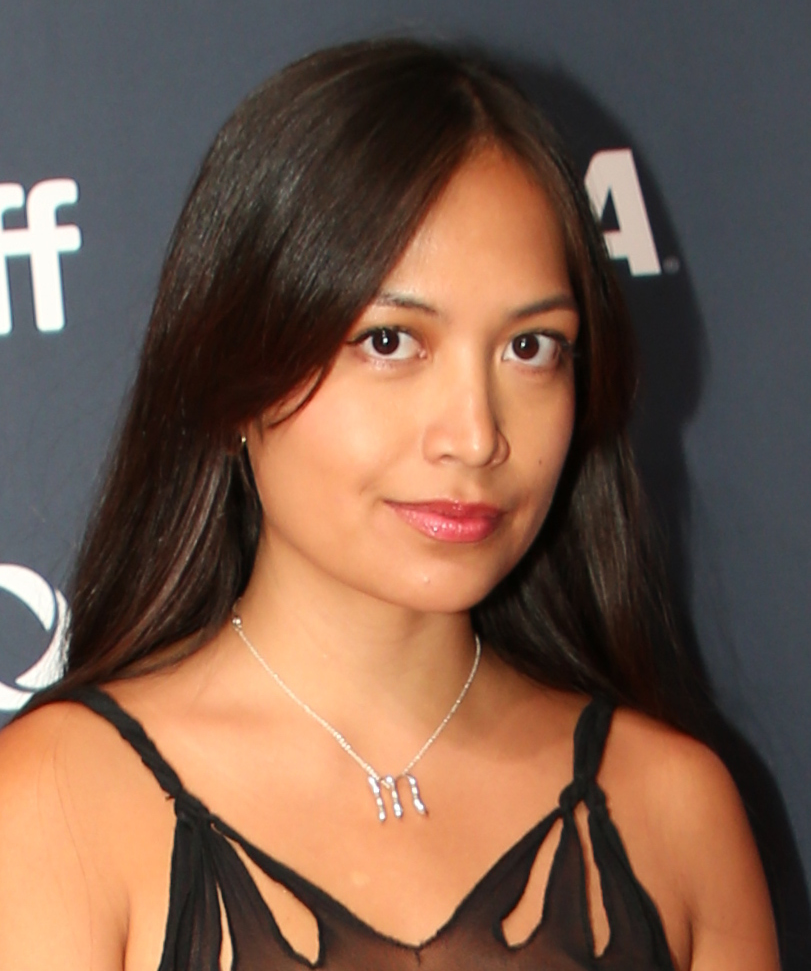
Granados in 2024

Marlowe Granados is a Canadian writer and filmmaker from Toronto, Ontario. Her debut novel Happy Hour was published in 2020, and was a shortlisted finalist for the Amazon.ca First Novel Award in 2021.

She has also co-hosted The Mean Reds, a podcast about movies, with Ivana Lovric, and has written an advice column for the online magazine The Baffler.

The Leaving Party, her debut short film as a filmmaker, premiered in 2019. In 2024 she had a supporting acting role in the film Matt and Mara.
