= Luis De Filippis =

Canadian-Italian trans-femme filmmaker

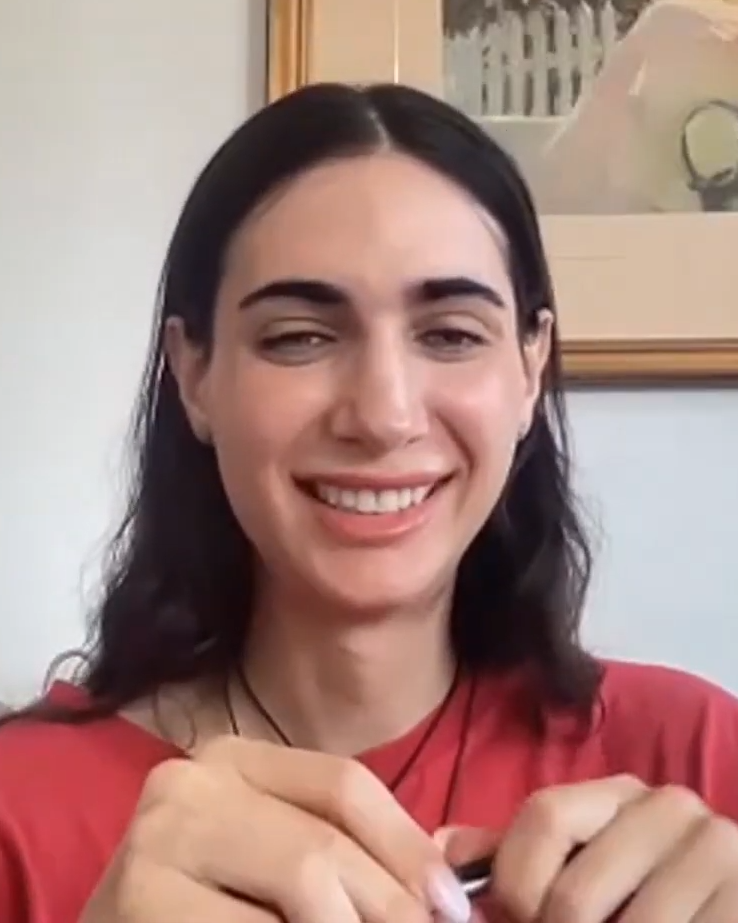
De Filippis from an interview

Luis De Filippis is an Italian Canadian film director and screenwriter from Toronto, Ontario, Canada. Her work includes the award-winning short film For Nonna Anna (2017) and her feature-length directorial debut Something You Said Last Night (2022). As a trans femme filmmaker, De Filippis has become known for challenging and redefining trans representation within contemporary cinema.

== Early life and education ==
De Filippis was raised in Vaughan, Ontario, Canada, by an Italian Canadian family. Before going to film school, she trained in ballet at Canada's National Ballet School in Toronto, Ontario, Canada. After ballet, she pursued Image Arts: Film at Toronto Metropolitan University (previously known as Ryerson University), graduating in 2012. De Filippis has cited her family and Italian Canadian heritage as her inspiration for her films.

== Career ==
Before pursuing a film career, De Filippis worked as a movie theater usher at the Toronto International Film Festival (TIFF) for six years. She began her filmmaking career in the 2010s, directing a few short films before her breakout short film, For Nonna Anna (2017).

=== For Nonna Anna (2017) ===
De Filippis first attracted acclaim for her 2017 short film For Nonna Anna, which was a Canadian Screen Award nominee for Best Live Action Short Drama at the 7th Canadian Screen Awards in 2019. For Nonna Anna, is the story of Chris (played by Maya Henry), a young transgender woman, and her relationship with her elderly grandmother. It is considered her breakout work in the film industry.

The short film premiered at the Toronto Film Festival in 2017, later receiving a Special Jury Prize at the Sundance Film Festival. De Filippis was also the winner of the Emerging Canadian Artist award at the 2018 Inside Out Film and Video Festival for her work on For Nonna Anna.

=== Something You Said Last Night (2022) ===
Her debut feature, Something You Said Last Night (2022), is a comedy-drama about a young trans woman named Ren (played by Carmen Madonia) on a family vacation. It explores family dynamics within a Canadian Italian family. Her film premiered at the Toronto International Film Festival in September 2022. The film went on to win several awards, such as the Shawn Mendes Foundation Changemaker Award, the Sebastiáne Award, and the Rotterdam Youth Jury Award. The film also screened at several international film festivals such as the San Sebastián International Film Festival and the Rotterdam Film Festival. Following the film's festival success, the film received endorsement by American actress and media personality Julia Fox, who joined as executive producer.

De Filippis has been a participant of Chanel's Women Writers' Network, TIFF Talent Lab, and the TIFF Writers' Studio.

== Style ==
According to Indie Wire, De Filippis's style of filmmaking uses a "fierce female gaze". In film critical studies, the male and female gaze were first popularized by Laura Mulvey and Jill Soloway, respectively. De Filippis's style involves the avoidance of sensationalizing trans identity. She does not focus on transitioning or trans struggle for her stories. Instead, she chooses to focus on family dynamics and everyday ordinary trans representation.

== Legacy ==
De Filippis is an advocate for trans representation within contemporary cinema. Her work has been cited in emerging queer filmmakers' news media.

In 2022, De Filippis organized the first Trans Filmmakers Summit at the Toronto International Film Festival. The summit emphasizes community building, networking, and professional development for trans, non-binary, and gender-diverse filmmakers. It is an annual event meant to support and celebrate emerging filmmakers.

De Filippis also founded a mentorship program called the Trans Film Mentorship (TFM). TFM is a program that provides training, job opportunities, and work experience for trans filmmakers. This program allows trans youth to participate in different phases of film creation. The mentorship program has offered job opportunities in fields such as production, management, costume design, makeup, and cinematography.
