= Nathanaël Karmitz =

French film producer

Nathanaël Karmitz is a French film producer. Since 2005 he has been the chairman and CEO of MK2, the French film studio founded by his father Marin Karmitz, alongside his brother Elisha Karmitz serving as general manager.

== Awards ==
Award	Date of ceremony	Category	Work	Result	Ref(s)
Canadian Screen Awards	2013	Best Motion Picture	Laurence Anyways (with Lyse Lafontaine)	Nominated	
Canadian Screen Awards	2014	Best Motion Picture	Tom at the Farm (Tom à la ferme) (with Charles Gillibert, Xavier Dolan)	Nominated	
Chlotrudis Awards	2017	Best Movie	Mountains May Depart	Nominated	
Prix Iris	2013	Best Film	Laurence Anyways (with Lyse Lafontaine, Charles Gillibert)	Nominated	
Prix Iris	2014	Most Successful Film Outside Quebec	Tom at the Farm (with Xavier Dolan, Nancy Grant, Lyse Lafontaine, Charles Gillibert)	Nominated	
Prix Iris	2015	Most Successful Film Outside Quebec	Tom at the Farm (with Xavier Dolan, Nancy Grant, Lyse Lafontaine, Charles Gillibert)	Nominated	
Prix Iris	2015	Best Film	Tom at the Farm (with Xavier Dolan, Nancy Grant, Lyse Lafontaine, Charles Gillibert)	Nominated	
Prix Iris	2017	Best Film	It's Only the End of the World (Juste la fin du monde) (with Sylvain Corbeil, Nancy Grant, Xavier Dolan, Elisha Karmitz, Michel Merkt)	Won	
Prix Iris	2017	Most Successful Film Outside Quebec	It's Only the End of the World (Juste la fin du monde) (with Sylvain Corbeil, Nancy Grant, Xavier Dolan, Elisha Karmitz, Michel Merkt)	Won	
Prix Iris	2017	Public Prize	It's Only the End of the World (Juste la fin du monde) (with Sylvain Corbeil, Nancy Grant, Xavier Dolan, Elisha Karmitz, Michel Merkt)	Nominated	
Prix Iris	2024	Best Film	The Nature of Love (Simple comme Sylvain) (with Sylvain Corbeil, Nancy Grant, Elisha Karmitz + Patrick Roy for Prix Michel-Côté only)	Nominated	
Prix Iris	2024	Most Successful Film Outside Quebec	The Nature of Love (Simple comme Sylvain) (with Sylvain Corbeil, Nancy Grant, Elisha Karmitz + Patrick Roy for Prix Michel-Côté only)	Won	
Prix Iris	2024	Prix Michel-Côté	The Nature of Love (Simple comme Sylvain) (with Sylvain Corbeil, Nancy Grant, Elisha Karmitz + Patrick Roy for Prix Michel-Côté only)	Nominated	
