= An Extraordinary Person =

- Film poster
- French: Quelqu'un d'extraordinaire
- Directed by: Monia Chokri
- Written by: Monia Chokri
- Produced by: Nancy Grant
- Starring: Magalie Lépine-Blondeau
- Cinematography: Josée Deshaies
- Edited by: Xavier Dolan
- Production company: Metafilms
- Distributed by: La Distributrice des films
- Release date: August 13, 2013 (Locarno)
- Running time: 19 minutes
- Country: Canada
- Language: French

An Extraordinary Person (French: Quelqu'un d'extraordinaire) is a Canadian short drama film, directed by Monia Chokri and released in 2013. The film stars Magalie Lépine-Blondeau as Sarah, a brilliant academic who suffers from severe social anxiety but must cope with seeing many old friends at her colleague's engagement party. The film's cast also includes Anne Dorval, Sophie Cadieux, Evelyne Brochu, Anne-Élisabeth Bossé, Laurence Leboeuf, Marilyn Castonguay and Anne-Marie Cadieux.

The film premiered at the 2013 Locarno Festival, and was named in the Toronto International Film Festival's annual year-end Canada's Top Ten list as one of the ten best Canadian short films of 2013. It won the Prix Jutra for Best Short Film at the 16th Jutra Awards.
