= Elisha Karmitz =

French film producer

Elisha Karmitz is a French film producer. Since 2005 he has been the general manager of MK2, the French film studio founded by his father Marin Karmitz, alongside his brother Nathanaël Karmitz serving as chairman and CEO.

== Awards ==
Award	Date of ceremony	Category	Work	Result	Ref(s)
Prix Iris	2017	Best Film	It's Only the End of the World (Juste la fin du monde) (with Sylvain Corbeil, Nancy Grant, Xavier Dolan, Nathanaël Karmitz, Michel Merkt)	Won	
Prix Iris	2017	Most Successful Film Outside Quebec	It's Only the End of the World (Juste la fin du monde) (with Sylvain Corbeil, Nancy Grant, Xavier Dolan, Nathanaël Karmitz, Michel Merkt)	Won	
Prix Iris	2017	Public Prize	It's Only the End of the World (Juste la fin du monde) (with Sylvain Corbeil, Nancy Grant, Xavier Dolan, Nathanaël Karmitz, Michel Merkt)	Nominated	
Prix Iris	2024	Best Film	The Nature of Love (Simple comme Sylvain) (with Sylvain Corbeil, Nancy Grant, Nathanaël Karmitz + Patrick Roy for Prix Michel-Côté only)	Nominated	
Prix Iris	2024	Most Successful Film Outside Quebec	The Nature of Love (Simple comme Sylvain) (with Sylvain Corbeil, Nancy Grant, Nathanaël Karmitz + Patrick Roy for Prix Michel-Côté only)	Won	
Prix Iris	2024	Prix Michel-Côté	The Nature of Love (Simple comme Sylvain) (with Sylvain Corbeil, Nancy Grant, Nathanaël Karmitz + Patrick Roy for Prix Michel-Côté only)	Nominated	
