= Anne Dixon (costume designer) =

Canadian costume designer

Anne Dixon is a Canadian film, television and theatrical costume designer.

== Awards ==
Award	Year	Category	Work	Result	Ref.
Canadian Alliance of Film and Television Costume Arts and Design	2020	Best Costume Design in International Feature	The Song of Names	Won	
Canadian Alliance of Film and Television Costume Arts and Design	2021	Best Costume Design in Television	The Comey Rule	Nominated	
Canadian Alliance of Film and Television Costume Arts and Design	2025	Best Costume Design in Film	The Shrouds	Nominated	
Genie Awards/Canadian Screen Awards	2006	Best Costume Design (Film)	Saint Ralph	Nominated	
Genie Awards/Canadian Screen Awards	2018	Best Costume Design (Television)	Anne with an E: "Your Will Shall Decide Your Destiny"	Nominated	
Genie Awards/Canadian Screen Awards	2020	Best Costume Design (Film)	The Song of Names	Nominated	
Genie Awards/Canadian Screen Awards	2021	Best Costume Design (Film)	Falling	Nominated	
Genie Awards/Canadian Screen Awards	2025	Best Costume Design (Film)	The Shrouds	Nominated	
