= Madeleine Sims-Fewer =

Canadian independent filmmaker and actress

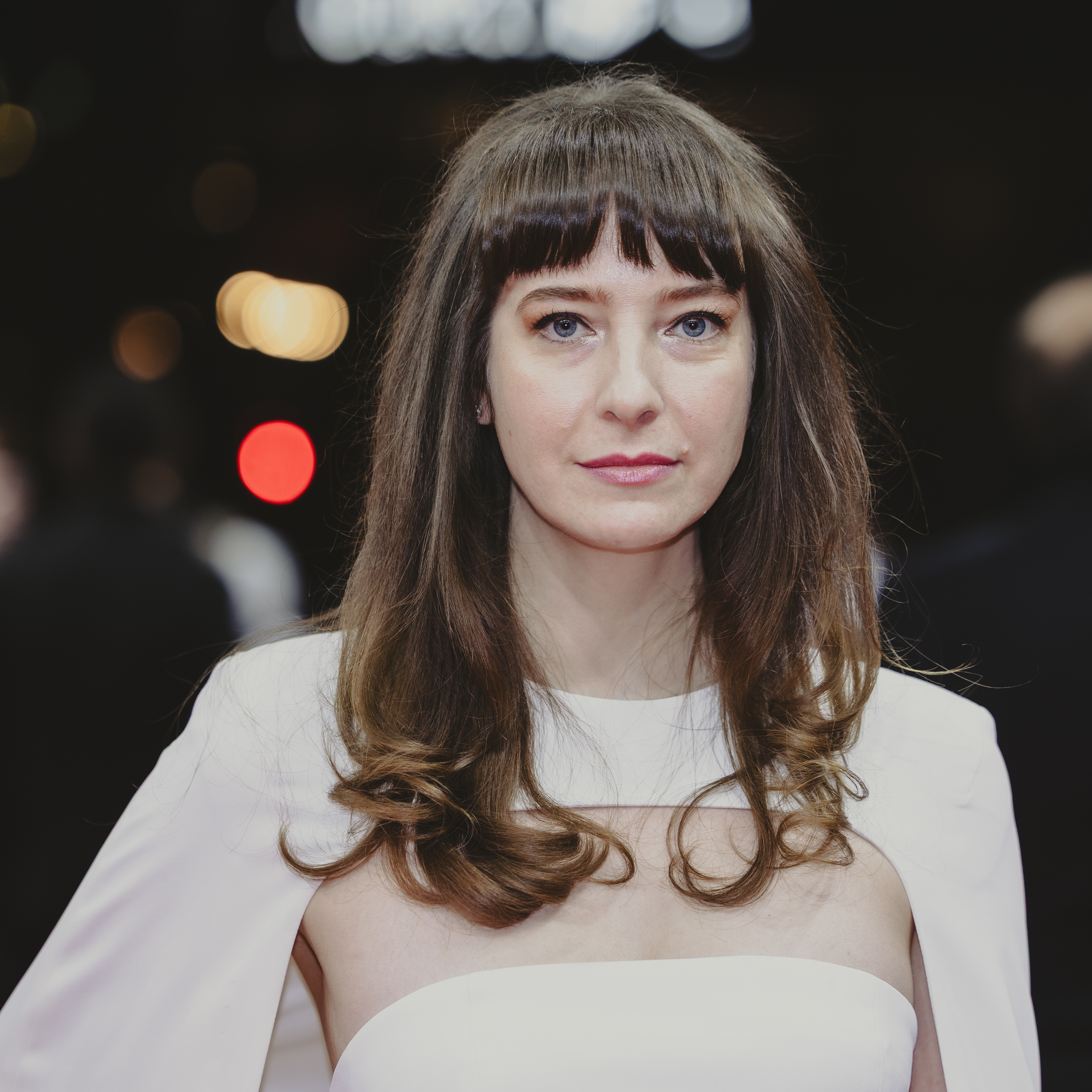
- Sims-Fewer at the Berlinale 2025
- Born: Kawartha Lakes, Ontario, Canada
- Occupations: Filmmaker, actress

Madeleine Sims-Fewer is a British-Canadian independent filmmaker and actress.

== Personal life ==
Sims-Fewer was born in Kawartha Lakes, Ontario, Canada. Her family moved to Bath, England when she was two years old. She attended Kingswood School, Bath where her father was head of Drama. Sims-Fewer studied filmmaking at York University in Toronto. She returned to England to study acting at the Drama Centre London.

== Career ==
=== Acting roles ===
After several shorts, Sims-Fewer made her feature film debut in Operation Avalanche in 2016.

=== Mancinelli and Sims-Fewer collaborations ===
In 2015, Sims-Fewer met Dusty Mancinelli at the 2015 TIFF Talent Lab. Since 2017, the pair has co-directed several short films in their DM Films joint venture. Their films have been shown at Sundance, TIFF, Telluride, BFI London Film Festival, Vancouver International Film Festival, the Moscow International Film Festival and the Slamdance Film Festival, among others. Their first collaboration, Slap Happy, about a tempestuous relationship, was an official selection at the BFI London Film Festival, Vancouver and Slamdance. Reviewer Ben Robins named it one of the best short films at the BFI Festival, describing it as "like a little less touched-up Blue Valentine, with a much more twisted sense of humour." Their second collaboration was Woman in Stall, a "claustrophobic thriller" about an encounter in a public restroom between a man and a woman trapped in a cubicle. It won the Short Film Grand Jury Prize at the Slamdance festival. Chubby, their third collaboration, was shown at the 2019 Telluride festival. A study of a 10-year-old's experience with sexual abuse, it was described as "harrowing" and would "stay with you long after its credits roll".

==== Violation ====
A teaser of their debut feature Violation was shown at the Cannes Marché du Film Online in June 2020. Violation, which is described as "decidedly dark, potentially dangerous and probably deranged" and "flips the revenge genre on its head", was selected for the "Fantastic 7" genre festival initiative to highlight genre films at seven international film festivals. Violation premiered at the 2020 Toronto International Film Festival in the "Midnight Madness" program. Critic Mike Crisolago has named it one of 30 films he is already "excited to see." Now Toronto critic Norman Wilner called it "a major levelling up of their signature combination of rage and intensity". The Guardian called it "a brutal and brilliant debut." According to Variety reviewer Tomris Laffley, "Despite some heavy-handed choices, Madeleine Sims-Fewer and Dusty Mancinelli pack a profound gut-punch with their debut feature." Violation was a NY Times Critic's Pick, with critic Lena Wilson writing, 'Sims-Fewer is the standout, a quadruple threat whose fearlessness renders a protagonist devolving from a doe-eyed wisecrack to a woman on the verge. She is at her best opposite Maguire, their sisterly dynamic constantly wavering between devotion and competition.'

Sims-Fewer won two Vancouver Film Critics Circle Awards for Best Actress and Best Film. She also received two Canadian Screen Award nominations at the 9th Canadian Screen Awards in 2021, for Best Actress and the John Dunning Best First Feature Award.

== Filmography ==
Film/Series	Year	Actor	Director	Writer	Notes
The Adventures of Ratman	2007	Ellen			short
Souvenirs from Asia	2007	Art Student			short
A Stir in the Forest	2008	Miss Simmons	✓	✓	short
Fix Me	2011	Claire		✓	short
Blood In	2012	Nikki		✓	short
Jess & Maria	2012	Maria		✓	short
Rip-Off	2012	Madeleine		✓	short; co-writer
Inked	2013			✓	short; story
Red Reflections	2014	Amelia			short
The Storm at Yellow Creek Farm	2014	Ada		✓	short
The Substitute	2015	Miss Byrd		✓	short
Foxes	2016	Receptionist			short
Operation Avalanche	2016	Madeleine			feature
Emma	2016	Dermatologist			short
Off-piste	2017	Bernadette			feature
The Expanse	2017	Refugee woman			episode of TV series
Cut	2017			✓	short; co-writer
Slap Happy	2017	Joanna	✓		short
Rape Card	2018	Frances	✓	✓	short
Woman In Stall	2018	Woman	✓		short
The Roots of Men	2018	Dee			short
Chubby	2019		✓	✓	short
Violation	2020	Miriam	✓	✓	feature
Honey Bunch	2025		✓	✓	feature; BIFF Berlinale Special 2025
