= List of Canadian films of 1999 =

This is a list of Canadian films which were released in 1999:

Title	Director	Cast	Genre	Notes
Atomic Saké	Louise Archambault	Audrey Benoît, Suzanne Clément	Short	Prix Jutra – Short
Babar: King of the Elephants	Raymond Jafelice	voices Dan Lett, Janet-Laine Green, Wayne Robson, Chris Wiggins, Kristin Fairlie	Animated feature	Canada-France-German co-production
Babel	Gérard Pullicino	Mitchell David Rothpan, Maria de Medeiros, Michel Jonasz, Tchéky Karyo	Fantasy, adventure	
Beefcake	Thom Fitzgerald	Daniel MacIvor, Jonathan Torrens, Jack LaLanne	Docudrama	Canada-UK-France co-production
Below the Belt	Dominique Cardona, Laurie Colbert	Nathalie Toriel, Cara Pifko, Tanja Jacobs	Short drama	
Better Than Chocolate	Anne Wheeler	Wendy Crewson, Karyn Dwyer, Christina Cox, Peter Outerbridge	Comedy drama	
The Big Snake of the World (Le Grand Serpent du monde)	Yves Dion	Murray Head, Gabriel Arcand, Louise Portal	Drama	
Boozecan	Nicholas Campbell	Justin Louis, Eugene Lipinski, Kenneth Welsh, Jan Rubeš	Crime drama	
Cuckoo, Mr. Edgar! (Coucou Monsieur Edgar!)	Pierre M. Trudeau		National Film Board animated short	
Deep Inside Clint Star	Clint Alberta		Documentary	
Dinner at Fred's	Shawn Thompson	Gil Bellows, Parker Posey, Kevin McDonald, John Neville, Christopher Lloyd	Black comedy	
The Divine Ryans	Stephen Reynolds	Jordan Harvey, Robert Joy, Pete Postlethwaite, Mary Walsh	Drama	
Elvis Gratton II: Miracle à Memphis	Pierre Falardeau	Julien Poulin	Satire	
Doctor Virtuous	Daniel Cockburn	Daniel Cockburn	Short experimental film	Made for the On The Fly Festival
eXistenZ	David Cronenberg	Jennifer Jason Leigh, Jude Law, Ian Holm, Willem Dafoe, Christopher Eccleston, Don McKellar	Body horror/Science fiction	Genie Award – Editing; Berlin Film Festival – Silver Bear; Canada-UK co-production
Eye of the Beholder	Stephan Elliott	Ashley Judd, Ewan McGregor, Patrick Bergin, Geneviève Bujold, k.d. lang, Jason Priestley	Thriller	Canada-UK-Australia co-production
Felicia's Journey	Atom Egoyan	Bob Hoskins, Elaine Cassidy, Arsinée Khanjian	Drama based on the novel by William Trevor	Genie Awards – Adapted Screenplay, Actor (Hoskins), Cinematography, Musical Score; Canada-UK co-production
The Five Senses	Jeremy Podeswa	Mary-Louise Parker, Gabrielle Rose, Molly Parker, Daniel MacIvor, Philippe Volter, Nadia Litz, Brendan Fletcher, Marco Leonardi, Pascale Bussières, Paul Soles, Richard Clarkin	Drama	
Forest Alert (L'Erreur boréale)	Richard Desjardins & Robert Monderie		A powerful, point-to-view documentary that created controversy in Quebec and amendments to the Provinces’ Forest Act in 2005.	Prix Jutra – Documentary
Four Days	Curtis Wehrfritz	Kevin Zegers, Colm Meaney, Lolita Davidovich, William Forsythe, Anne-Marie Cadieux	Crime drama	
Full Blast	Rodrigue Jean	David La Haye, Louise Portal, Marie-Jo Thério	Drama	Prix Jutra – Supporting Actress (Thério)
Grey Owl	Richard Attenborough	Pierce Brosnan, Nathaniel Arcand, David Fox, Graham Greene	Biopic based on the life of Grey Owl	Genie Award - Costumes; Canada-UK co-production
Grizzly Falls	Stewart Raffill	Daniel Clark, Bryan Brown, Tom Jackson, Richard Harris	Family film	Canada-UK co-production
The Hat (Le Chapeau)	Michèle Cournoyer		National Film Board animated short	Prix Jutra – Animated Short; TIFF – Best Canadian Short; Annecy International Animation Film Festival – International Critics Prize
Hemingway: A Portrait	Érik Canuel		Documentary	
I Know a Place	Roy Mitchell	Bob Goderre	Short documentary	
Images of a Dictatorship	Patricio Henríquez		Feature documentary	Documentary on Chilean dictator General Augusto Pinochet; Prix Jutra - Documentary
Jacob Two Two Meets the Hooded Fang	George Bloomfield	Gary Busey, Mark McKinney, Miranda Richardson, Max Morrow, Ice-T	Family film based on the short story by Mordecai Richler	Genie Award - Song
Jesus' Son	Alison Maclean	Billy Crudup, Samantha Morton, Denis Leary	Drama	
Johnny	Carl Bessai	Chris Martin, Gema Zamprogna, Kris Lemche	Drama	
Just Watch Me: Trudeau and the '70s Generation	Catherine Annau		Documentary	Genie for Best Feature Doc explores the Trudeau legacy
Kuproquo	Jean-François Rivard	Alain Zouvi, Maude Guérin	Short comedy drama	Several international awards
The Last Breath (Le Dernier souffle)	Richard Ciupka	Luc Picard, Serge Houde, Michel Goyette	Drama	
Laugh in the Dark	Justine Pimlott	Gary Colwell, Don Morden, Doris Mehegan	Documentary	
Laura Cadieux II (Laura Cadieux...la suite)	Denise Filiatrault	Ginette Reno, Pierrette Robitaille, Dominique Michel	Comedy	
The Life Before This	Jerry Ciccoritti	Catherine O'Hara, Joe Pantoliano, Sarah Polley, Stephen Rea	Drama	Genie Award – Supporting Actress (O’Hara)
The Little Varius (Le P'tit Varius)	Alain Jacques	Samuel Robichaud, Paul Buissonneau, Pierre Mailloux	Short drama	
Loyalties	Lesley Ann Patten		Documentary	Canada Award-winner
Matroni and Me (Matroni et moi)	Jean-Philippe Duval		Crime comedy	
Memories Unlocked (Souvenirs intimes)	Jean Beaudin	James Hyndman, Pascale Bussières	Drama	
My Father's Angel	Davor Marjanovic	Tony Nardi, Timothy Webber	Drama	
My Gentleman Friends	Moze Mossanen	Aron Tager, David Gardner, François Klanfer, Christina Collins	Docudrama	
My Grandmother Ironed the King's Shirts	Torill Kove	Mag Ruffman (narration)	Animated short co-produced with National Film Board	Academy Award nominee; Canada-Norway co-production
La Petite Histoire d'un homme sans histoire	Jean-François Asselin		Drama short	
New Waterford Girl	Allan Moyle	Liane Balaban, Nicholas Campbell, Tara Spencer-Nairn, Mary Walsh	Drama	
The Old Man and the Sea	Aleksandr Petrov		Animated short	Prix Jutra – Animation; Academy Award – Animated Short; first animated IMAX short; Canada-Russia-Japan co-production
Pin-Pon: The Film (Pin-Pon, le film)	Ghyslaine Côté	Yves Soutière, Thomas Graton, Philippe Lambert	Children's comedy	
The Pinco Triangle	Patrick Crowe, Tristan R. Whiston	Michael Fitzgerald, Lorraine Segato	Documentary	
Post Mortem	Louis Bélanger	Gabriel Arcand, Sylvie Moreau, Hélène Loiselle	Drama	Prix Jutra – Picture, Director, Screenplay, Actor (Arcand), Editing
Rollercoaster	Scott Smith	Brendan Fletcher, Kett Turton	Drama	
Sable Island (L'Île de Sable)	Johanne Prégent	Caroline Dhavernas, Sébastien Huberdeau, Anick Lemay	Drama	
Set Me Free (Emporte-moi)	Léa Pool	Karine Vanasse, Pascale Bussières, Karine Vanasse, Miki Manojlović	Coming-of-age drama	Entered into the 49th Berlin International Film Festival; Canada-France-Switzerland co-production
Shoes Off!	Mark Sawers	Deanna Milligan, David Lewis	Comedy	International Critic's Week – Canal+ Best Short Film Award
Soul Cages	Phillip Barker	Susanna Hood, Srinivas Krishna	Short drama	
Sunshine	István Szabó	Ralph Fiennes, Rosemary Harris, Rachel Weisz, Jennifer Ehle, Deborah Kara Unger, Molly Parker	Drama	Genie Award – Picture, Sound; Canada-Austria-German-Hungary co-production
Top of the Food Chain	John Paizs	Campbell Scott, Fiona Loewi, Tom Everett Scott, Nigel Bennett	Off-beat sci-fi comedy, drama	
Tops & Bottoms: Sex, Power and Sadomasochism	Cristine Richey	Robert Dante, Mary Dante	Documentary	
Touched	Mort Ransen	Lynn Redgrave, Tygh Runyan, Maury Chaykin, Lolita Davidovich	Drama	
To Walk with Lions	Carl Schultz	Richard Harris, Ian Bannen, Kerry Fox, Honor Blackman, Geraldine Chaplin	Drama	Biopic of wildlife conservationist George Adamson; Canada-UK-Kenya co-production
Village of Idiots	Eugene Fedorenko & Rose Newlove		National Film Board animated short	Genie Award – Animated Short
When Justice Fails	Allan A. Goldstein	Jeff Fahey, Marlee Matlin, Carl Marotte	Crime drama	Made with US financing
When the Day Breaks	Wendy Tilby and Amanda Forbis	Martha Wainwright (song)	National Film Board animated short	
Where Lies the Homo?	Jean-François Monette		Documentary	
Who Gets the House?	Timothy J. Nelson	Ricky Mabe, Elisha Cuthbert, Sophie Lorain	Comedy drama family	

== See also ==
- 1999 in Canada
- 1999 in Canadian television
