= Colette Loumède =

Canadian film producer

Colette Loumède is a Canadian film producer, most noted for her longtime association with the National Film Board of Canada. A producer and executive producer with the studio's French-language documentary unit in the 2000s and 2010s, she stepped down from that role in 2018, and has more recently been associated with the commercial studio Bravo Charlie.

She was also founding director of the documentary filmmaking program at the Institut national de l'image et du son.

== Filmography ==
- Le prix de la vie - 1998
- Nothing Sacred (Y'a rien de sacré) - 2003
- Les héritiers du mouton noir - 2003
- Édith et Michel - 2004
- Tintamarre: La piste Acadie en Amérique - 2004
- The Peacekeepers - 2005
- 538x la vie - 2005
- Marron: On the Trail of Creoles in North America (Marron: la piste créole en Amérique) - 2005
- The Fight for True Farming (Pas de pays, sans paysans) - 2005
- Bonne Chance - 2005
- À part des autres - 2006
- 120 Seconds to Get Elected - 2006
- The Dark Side of the White Lady (El lado obscuro de la dama blanca) - 2006
- The Genius of Crime (Le Génie du crime) - 2006
- Driven by Dreams (À force de rêves) - 2006
- La peau et les os, après... - 2006
- The Mystical Brain (Le Cerveau mystique) - 2006
- Le blues de l'Orient - 2007
- The Invisible Nation (Le Peuple invisible) - 2007
- Northern Greetings (Des nouvelles du Nord) - 2007
- Is My Story Hurting You? - 2007
- Shorts in Motion: The Art of Seduction - 2007
- Under the Hood: A Voyage Into the World of Torture (Sous la cagoule, un voyage au bout de la torture) - 2008
- The Memories of Angels (La Mémoire des anges) - 2008
- Has God Forsaken Africa? (Dieu a-t-il quitté l’Afrique?) - 2008
- Grace, Milly, Lucy... Child Soldiers - 2010
- The Hole Story (Trou story) - 2011
- À St-Henri, le 26 août - 2011
- In Pieces (Trente tableaux) - 2011
- Exile: A Myth Unearthed - 2011
- Yvon Deschamps - 2011
- United States of Africa (Les États-Unis d'Afrique) - 2012
- Wavemakers (Le Chant des ondes) - 2012
- Alphée of the Stars (Alphée des étoiles) - 2012
- Silence Is Gold (Le Prix des mots) - 2012
- Absences - 2013
- Guidelines (La marche à suivre) - 2014
- Finding Macpherson (Le mystère Macpherson) - 2014
- Where I'm From (D'où je viens) - 2014
- Uyghurs: Prisoners of the Absurd (Ouïghours, prisonniers de l'absurde) - 2014
- Self(less) Portrait (Autoportrait sans moi) - 2014
- Il ventait devant ma porte - 2014
- The Wanted 18 - 2014
- Remembering Maria Chapdelaine (Sur les traces de Maria Chapdelaine) - 2015
- Hell Runs on Gasoline! (L'Enfer marche au gaz!) - 2015
- Interview with a Free Man (Entrevue avec un homme libre) - 2015
- Une nuit - 2015
- À la plage - 2015
- World of Passage (Ces hommes de passage) - 2015
- The Amina Profile (Le profil Amina) - 2015
- Waseskun - 2016
- A Good Harvest (Une bonne récolte) - 2016
- Stone Makers (Carrière) - 2016
- Gulîstan, Land of Roses (Gulîstan, terre des roses) - 2016
- The Devil's Share (La Part du diable) - 2017
- Red Path (Le Chemin rouge) - 2017
- For the Love of the Fight: Jean Beaudin (Pour l'amour du combat: Jean Beaudin) - 2017
- Labrecque, une caméra pour la mémoire - 2017
- 24 Davids - 2017
- First Stripes (Premières armes) - 2018
- My War - 2018
- The Apollo of Gaza (L'Apollon de Gaza) - 2018
- Pauline Julien, Intimate and Political (Pauline Julien, intime et politique) - 2018
- Daughter of the Crater (La fille du cratère) - 2019
- Where the Land Ends (La Fin des terres) - 2019
- White Noise (Le Fond de l'air) - 2019
- Kenbe la, Until We Win (Kenbe la, jusqu'à la victoire) - 2019
- Far from Bashar (Loin de Bachar) - 2020
- The Rose Family (Les Rose) - 2020
- Into the Light - 2020
- Gatherings (Ramaillages) - 2020
- Waiting for Raif (En attendant Raif) - 2022
- Ninan Auassat: We, the Children (Ninan Auassat: Nous, les enfants) - 2024
- Imane's Promise (La Promesse d'Imane) - 2024

== Awards ==
Award	Date of ceremony	Category	Work	Result	Ref(s)
Canadian Screen Awards	2013	Best Feature Length Documentary	Alphée of the Stars (Alphée des étoiles) with Eric De Gheldere, Hugo Latulippe	Nominated	
Canadian Screen Awards	2015	Best Feature Length Documentary	Guidelines (La marche à suivre) with Jean-François Caissy, Johanne Bergeron	Nominated	
Canadian Screen Awards	2016	Best Feature Length Documentary	The Amina Profile (Le profil Amina) with Isabelle Couture, Nathalie Cloutier, Hugo Latulippe, Michel St-Cyr, Guy Villeneuve	Nominated	
Canadian Screen Awards	2017	Best Feature Length Documentary	Waseskun with Steve Patry, Nathalie Cloutier, Denis McCready	Nominated	
Canadian Screen Awards	2017	Best Short Documentary	Stone Makers (Carrière) with Jean-Marc E. Roy, Denis McCready, Claudia Chabot	Nominated	
Canadian Screen Awards	2019	Best Feature Length Documentary	The Devil's Share (La Part du diable) with Luc Bourdon	Nominated	
Prix Iris	2015	Best Documentary Film	Finding Macpherson (Le mystère Macpherson) with Serge Giguère, Nicole Hubert, Sylvie Van Brabant	Won	
Prix Iris	2015	Best Documentary Film	Guidelines (La marche à suivre) with Jean-François Caissy, Johanne Bergeron	Nominated	
Prix Iris	2015	Best Documentary Film	Self(less) Portrait (Autoportrait sans moi) with Danic Champoux	Nominated	
Prix Iris	2018	Best Documentary Film	The Devil's Share (La part du diable) with Luc Bourdon	Nominated	
Prix Iris	2021	Prix Public	The Rose Family (Les Rose) with Félix Rose, Marco Frascarelli, Philippe-A. Allard, Eric Piccoli	Won	
