= Where I'm From (film) =

- French: D'où je viens
- Directed by: Claude Demers
- Written by: Claude Demers
- Produced by: Colette Loumède
- Narrated by: Claude Demers
- Cinematography: Nicolas Canniccioni; Jean-Pierre St-Louis
- Edited by: Alexandre Leblanc
- Music by: Alexandre Corbeil; Gabriel Dharmoo
- Production company: National Film Board of Canada
- Release date: 2013
- Running time: 78 minutes
- Country: Canada
- Language: French

Where I'm From (French: D'où je viens) is a 2013 National Film Board of Canada documentary by Claude Demers, exploring his childhood in the working class city of Verdun, Quebec and contrasting his experiences with life today in Verdun, now a multi-cultural borough of Montreal.

Where I'm From focuses on two neighbourhood boys who serve as stand-ins for Demers as a child, as well as a variety of local characters. The film explores the changing face of Verdun as well as the filmmaker's anger and unhappiness as a child, due in part to his being adopted. The film also explores the powerful role that the Saint Lawrence River, which borders Verdun, has played in his own imaginative life growing up, as well as the lives of the children in his film.

Demers has stated that it also represented a creative risk to make a documentary film not based on interviews, as he had previously done, but rather a personal film that attempts to see life through the eyes of child.

Demers, who now lives in Mile End, Montreal, rented an apartment in his old neighbourhood for three months to regain a feel for the neighbourhood as he planned his shoot. During that process, five key themes emerged that became central to the film, according to the director: "Childhood. The relationship with nature. Faith. The words. And struggle. That was my guideline."

== Trilogy ==
The film has been billed at times as part of two different trilogies. It followed on two films that he was inspired to make after finally meeting his biological mother, which were inspired by the broader cultural contexts in which his birth parents lived but were not as directly personal, and preceded two much more personal essay films about his birth parents as individuals.

Barbers: A Men's Story (Barbiers – Une histoire d'hommes), the first of the cultural films, was inspired by his birth father's Italian Canadian heritage and centred on the culture of Italian barbers in Montreal. Demers' follow up film, Ladies in Blue (Les dames en bleu), was about Quebec singer Michel Louvain and his legion of mostly female fans from his mother's generation.

Demers subsequently also directed A Woman, My Mother (Une femme, ma mère), an essay film about his efforts to learn more about his birth mother after her death, and Diary of a Father (Journal d'un père), which explored his own relationship with the concept of fatherhood through the lens of both his birth and adoptive fathers, as well as his own relationship with his young daughter.

== Release ==
The film had its world premiere at International Film Festival Rotterdam, followed by the Canadian documentary film festivals RIDM and Hot Docs. It had its theatrical premiere at Excentris in Montreal and Cinema Le Clap in Quebec City on December 26, 2014.

The film received a Canadian Screen Award nomination for Best Cinematography in a Documentary at the 3rd Canadian Screen Awards.
