= Hivon =

Hivon is a surname. Notable people with the surname include:

- Julie Hivon, Canadian film and television director
- Patrick Hivon (born 1975), Canadian actor
- Véronique Hivon (born 1970), Canadian politician in Québec
