= Silence Lies =

- Film poster
- French: Tromper le silence
- Directed by: Julie Hivon
- Written by: Julie Hivon
- Produced by: Sylvain Corbeil; Nancy Grant; Julie Hivon
- Starring: Suzanne Clément; Maxime Dumontier; Sébastien Huberdeau
- Cinematography: Claudine Sauvé
- Edited by: Natalie Lamoureux
- Music by: Alexandre Désilets; Sei Nakauchi Pelletier
- Production company: Les Films de L'Autre
- Distributed by: Christal Films; Les Films Séville
- Release date: August 30, 2010 (MWFF)
- Running time: 109 minutes
- Country: Canada
- Language: French

Silence Lies (French: Tromper le silence) is a Canadian drama film, directed by Julie Hivon and released in 2010. The film stars Suzanne Clément as Viviane Langevin, a photographer who is starved for creative inspiration ever since being disowned by her brother Frédéric (Sébastien Huberdeau) following a family dispute, when she meets Guillaume (Maxime Dumontier), a troubled young man who reminds her strongly of her brother.

The cast also includes Sophie Cadieux, Benoît Gouin, Claude Prégent and Pascale Montpetit.

The film was shot in 2009, primarily in Anjou, and premiered in August 2010 at the Montreal World Film Festival.

The film received two Jutra Award nominations at the 13th Jutra Awards in 2011, for Best Actress (Clément) and Best Cinematography (Claudine Sauvé).
