= From Prisons to Prisons =

- French: De prisons en prisons
- Directed by: Steve Patry
- Written by: Steve Patry
- Produced by: Steve Patry
- Cinematography: Steve Patry
- Edited by: Diego Briceno
- Music by: Sei Nakauchi Pelletier
- Production company: Les Films de l'Autre
- Distributed by: Les Films du 3 mars
- Release date: November 14, 2014 (RIDM)
- Running time: 85 minutes
- Country: Canada
- Language: French

From Prisons to Prisons (French: De prisons en prisons) is a Canadian documentary film, directed by Steve Patry and released in 2014. The film profiles three ex-convicts who are adapting to life on the outside after being released from prison, depicting the ways in which their situation, with the challenges and stereotypes that they're forced to confront in rebuilding their lives, constitutes its own ongoing form of prison.

The film premiered at the 2014 Montreal International Documentary Festival, before going into commercial release in December.

The film received a Prix Iris nomination for Best Documentary Film at the 17th Jutra Awards in 2015.
