= Uyghurs: Prisoners of the Absurd =

2014 Canadian documentary film

- French: Ouïghours, prisonniers de l'absurde
- Directed by: Patricio Henríquez
- Written by: Patricio Henríquez
- Produced by: Patricio Henríquez; Colette Loumède
- Cinematography: Sylvestre Guidi; Patricio Henríquez
- Edited by: Andrea Henríquez
- Music by: Robert Marcel Lepage; Nicolas Borycki
- Production company: National Film Board of Canada
- Release date: October 10, 2014 (FNC)
- Running time: 98 minutes
- Country: Canada
- Languages: English; Uyghur

Uyghurs: Prisoners of the Absurd (French: Ouïghours, prisonniers de l'absurde) is a Canadian documentary film, directed by Patricio Henríquez and released in 2014. Following up on his 2011 film You Don't Like the Truth, the film documents the story of 22 Uyghur men who were captured as prisoners during the War in Afghanistan, and incarcerated at Guantanamo Bay for over a decade despite the lack of evidence that they had committed any crimes.

The film premiered at the 2014 Festival du nouveau cinéma, before going into wider release in winter 2015.

The film won the Prix Iris for Best Documentary Film at the 18th Quebec Cinema Awards in 2016.
