= What Are We Doing Here? =

What Are We Doing Here? may refer to:

- "What Are We Doing Here?", a song on John Entwistle's 1971 album Smash Your Head Against the Wall
- What Are We Doing Here? (film) (Qu'est-ce qu'on fait ici?), a 2014 film directed by Julie Hivon

== See also ==
- What Are We Doing (disambiguation)
