= 1999 in Canada =

- Decades: 1970s; 1980s; 1990s; 2000s; 2010s
- See also: History of Canada; Timeline of Canadian history; List of years in Canada

Events from the year 1999 in Canada.

== Incumbents ==
=== Crown ===
- Monarch – Elizabeth II

=== Federal government ===
- Governor General – Roméo LeBlanc (until October 7) then Adrienne Clarkson
- Prime Minister – Jean Chrétien
- Chief Justice of Canada – Antonio Lamer (Quebec)
- Parliament – 36th

=== Provincial governments ===
==== Lieutenant governors ====
- Lieutenant Governor of Alberta – Bud Olson
- Lieutenant Governor of British Columbia – Garde Gardom
- Lieutenant Governor of Manitoba – Yvon Dumont (until March 2) then Peter Liba
- Lieutenant Governor of New Brunswick – Marilyn Trenholme Counsell
- Lieutenant Governor of Newfoundland – Arthur Maxwell House
- Lieutenant Governor of Nova Scotia – James Kinley
- Lieutenant Governor of Ontario – Hillary Weston
- Lieutenant Governor of Prince Edward Island – Gilbert Clements
- Lieutenant Governor of Quebec – Lise Thibault
- Lieutenant Governor of Saskatchewan – Jack Wiebe

==== Premiers ====
- Premier of Alberta – Ralph Klein
- Premier of British Columbia – Glen Clark (until August 25) then Dan Miller
- Premier of Manitoba – Gary Filmon (until October 5) then Gary Doer
- Premier of New Brunswick – Camille Thériault (until June 21) then Bernard Lord
- Premier of Newfoundland – Brian Tobin
- Premier of Nova Scotia – Russell MacLellan (until August 16) then John Hamm
- Premier of Ontario – Mike Harris
- Premier of Prince Edward Island – Pat Binns
- Premier of Quebec – Lucien Bouchard
- Premier of Saskatchewan – Roy Romanow

=== Territorial governments ===
==== Commissioners ====
- Commissioner of Yukon – Judy Gingell
- Commissioner of Northwest Territories – Helen Maksagak (until March 26) then Daniel Joseph Marion
- Commissioner of Nunavut – Helen Maksagak (from April 1)

==== Premiers ====
- Premier of the Northwest Territories – Jim Antoine
- Premier of Nunavut – Paul Okalik (from April 1)
- Premier of Yukon – Piers McDonald

== Events ==
=== January to June ===
- January 1 – An avalanche destroys a school gymnasium during New Year's celebrations in Kangguspoo in far northern Quebec, killing 9.
- February 9 – Brian Tobin's Liberals are re-elected in Newfoundland.
- April 1 – Nunavut becomes the newest territory. Paul Okalik becomes the first premier.
- April 6 – A disgruntled employee kills four people, then killed himself in OC Transpo of Ottawa.
- April 28 – W. R. Myers High School shooting: in Taber, Alberta, a 15-year-old boy, who had recently been withdrawn from public school to escape bullying, walks into W.R. Myers High School and shoots two students with a .22 rifle, killing one (Jason Lang) and injuring the other.
- May 1 – Sponsorship scandal: The federal government issues a $615,000 contract for a report from Groupaction into its own activities.
- May 11 – Chevron announces a major natural gas find in the Northwest Territories.
- May 17 – The Saskatchewan government awards David Milgaard after he was jailed for 23 years for a murder he did not commit.
- May 20 – The Supreme Court expands gay spousal rights.
- May 27 – Julie Payette becomes the first Canadian to board the International Space Station.
- May 29 – 20-year-old Ojibwe woman Tammy Lamondin-Gagnon disappears from a public park in Newmarket, Ontario, initiating a still-unsolved missing persons case.
- June 3 – Ontario election: Mike Harris's PCs win a second consecutive majority.
- June 3 – Canada and the United States sign a treaty to divide the Pacific salmon fishery.
- June 4 – An agreement on split-run magazines prevents looming trade war with the United States.
- June 7 – Bernard Lord's Conservatives win a surprise election victory in New Brunswick.
- June 10 – The Reform Party of Canada votes to become the Canadian Alliance.
- June 17 – Canadian citizen Stanley Faulder is executed in Texas, despite diplomatic complaints by the Canadian government.
- June 21 – Bernard Lord becomes premier of New Brunswick, replacing Camille Thériault.
- June 30 – A British Columbia court strikes down Canada's child pornography laws.

=== July to December ===
- July 27 – Nova Scotia election: The Conservatives win a majority government in Nova Scotia.
- August 16 – John Hamm becomes premier of Nova Scotia, replacing Russell MacLellan.
- August 20 – The Supreme Court rules that Quebec cannot secede unilaterally, but that Canada is obliged to recognize a clear "yes" vote.
- August 20 – Eaton's files for bankruptcy.
- August 24 – Onex announces a plan to buy and merge Air Canada and Canadian Airlines.
- August 25 – Dan Miller, as interim leader of the NDP, becomes premier of British Columbia, replacing Glen Clark who resigned on the 21st.
- September 15 – Louise Arbour appointed to the Supreme Court replacing Antonio Lamer.
- September 19 – Saskatchewan election: Roy Romanow's NDP wins only a minority but forms a coalition with the Liberals to maintain control of the Legislative Assembly.
- September 25 – The federal government refuses requests for aid by the six remaining Canadian NHL franchises.
- October 5 – Gary Doer of the NDP becomes premier of Manitoba, replacing Gary Filmon of the Conservatives.
- October 7 – Adrienne Clarkson becomes Governor General.
- October 8 – Bill Clinton dedicates the new Embassy of the United States in Ottawa.
- October 15 – Robert Mundell wins the Nobel Prize for economics.
- October 19 – Air Canada, backed by other airlines, announces a takeover bid for Canadian Airlines.
- November 3 – Beverley McLachlin becomes the first female chief justice of the Supreme Court.
- November 5 – A Quebec court decides that Onex's bid for Air Canada is illegal.
- November 5 – Quebec sign law is overturned.
- November 21 – Nimiq 1 Canada's first direct broadcast digital TV satellite launched by a Proton-K Blok DM-3 rocket from the Tyuratam launch centre in Kazakhstan.
- December 8 – Air Canada takes over Canadian Airlines.
- December 11 – The verdict in the Just Desserts shooting case is handed down. Two of the accused are found guilty, the third is acquitted.
- December 14 – Montreal resident Ahmed Ressam is arrested in Seattle and found with large quantities of explosives.

== Arts and literature ==
=== New works ===
- Bonnie Burnard: A Good House
- Wayson Choy: Paper Shadows: A Chinatown Childhood
- Matt Cohen: Elizabeth and After
- Antonine Maillet: Chronique d'une sorcière de vent
- Russell Smith: Young Men
- Lola MacLaughlin: "Four Cities/Four Solos"

=== Awards ===
- Giller Prize for Canadian Fiction: Bonnie Burnard, A Good House
- See 1999 Governor General's Awards for a complete list of winners and finalists for those awards.
- Books in Canada First Novel Award: Andre Alexis, Childhood
- Gerald Lampert Award: Stephanie Bolster, White Stone: The Alice Poems
- Geoffrey Bilson Award: Iain Lawrence, The Wreckers
- Marian Engel Award: Janice Kulyk Keeger
- Norma Fleck Award: Andy Turnbull and Debora Pearson, By Truck to the North: My Winter Adventure
- Pat Lowther Award: Hilary Clark, More Light
- Stephen Leacock Award: Stuart McLean, Home from the Vinyl Cafe
- Trillium Book Award English: Alistair MacLeod, No Great Mischief
- Trillium Book Award French: Andrée Christensen and Jacques Flamand, Lithochronos ou le premier vol de la pierre
- Vicky Metcalf Award: Joan Clark

=== Music ===
- Céline Dion, Alanis Morissette, and Shania Twain win major Grammy Awards

=== Television ===
- September 13 – The first episode of the children's series Mona the Vampire is broadcast on YTV

== Sport ==
- February 13 – The last hockey game is played at Maple Leaf Gardens as the team moves to the new Air Canada Centre.
- April 16 – Wayne Gretzky retires from ice hockey.
- May 23 – Ottawa 67's win their second (and latest as of 2023) Memorial Cup by defeating the Calgary Hitmen. The tournament was played at Ottawa Civic Centre in Ottawa.
- June 19 – Oshawa, Ontario's Joe Nieuwendyk of the Dallas Stars is awarded the Conn Smythe Trophy.
- July 23 – August 8 – The Pan American Games are held in Winnipeg.
- November 13 – Lennox Lewis defeats Evander Holyfield to become the Heavyweight Champion of the World.
- November 28 – Hamilton Tiger-Cats win their eighth (and latest as of 2023) Grey Cup by defeating the Calgary Stampeders 32 to 21 in the 87th Grey Cup played at BC Place Stadium in Vancouver. Hamilton, Ontario's Mike Morreale was awarded the game's Most Valuable Canadian.

== Births ==
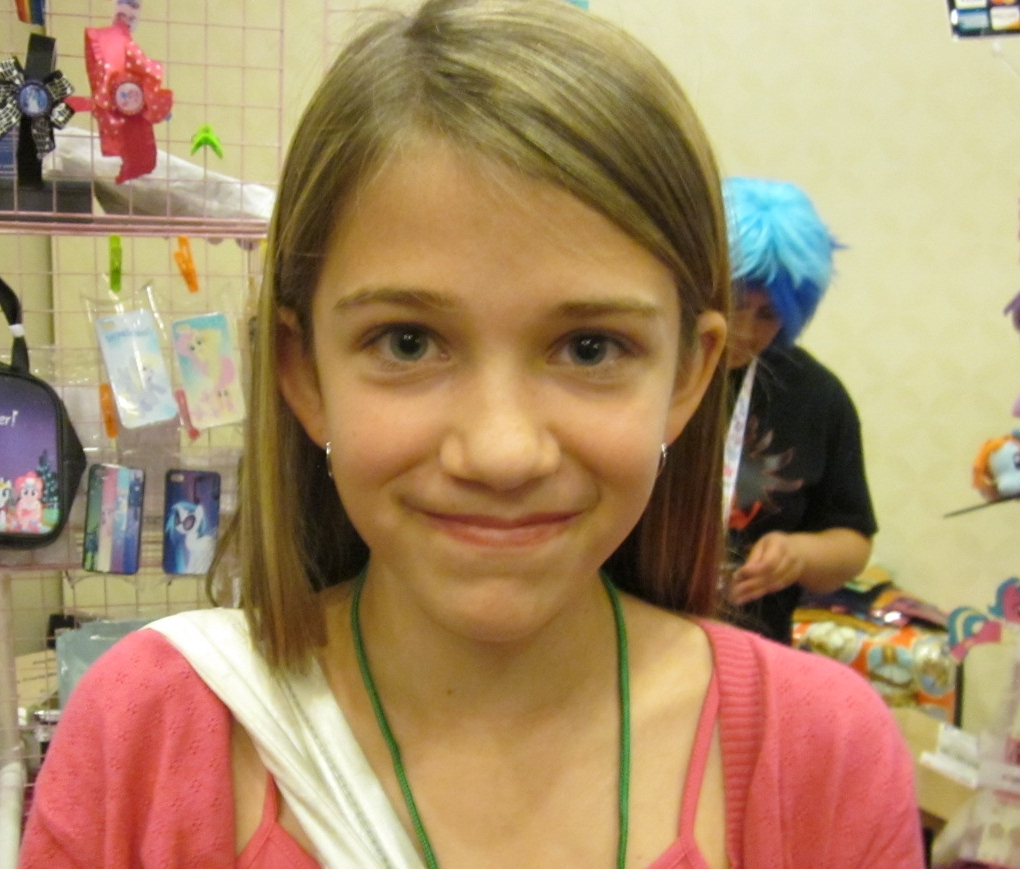
Claire Corlett

- January 4 – Gage Munroe, actor
- February 4 – Olivia Lunny, singer
- February 12 – Maggie Coles-Lyster, cyclist
- February 19 – Quinn Lord, actor
- April 8 – Jacob Guay, singer
- April 27 – Brooklynn Proulx, actress
- May 5 – Jonny Gray, actor
- July 9 – Claire Corlett, actress
- July 14 – Dawson Dunbar, actor
- August 2 – Mark Lee, rapper and member of South Korean boy group NCT
- August 17 – Akintoye, rapper
- August 22 – Dakota Goyo, actor
- September 7
  - Michelle Creber, actress
  - Laurie Jussaume, cyclist
- September 22 – Erin Pitt, actress
- November 8 – Katherine Uchida, rhythmic gymnast
- November 26 – King Ambers, football player
- November 30 – Gage Munroe, actor

=== Full date unknown ===
- Natasha Calis, actress
- Veronica Penny

== Deaths ==
=== January to March ===
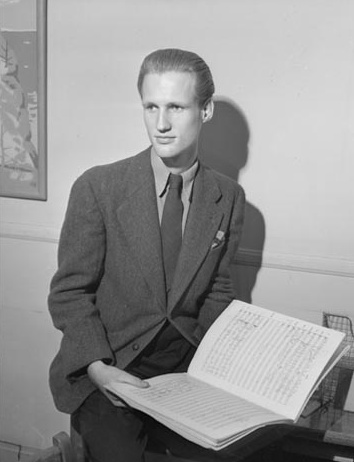
Harry Somers, 1947

- January 8 – James William Baskin, politician and businessman (born 1920)
- January 10 – Walter Harris, politician and lawyer (born 1904)
- February 8 – Denise Leblanc-Bantey, politician (born 1949)
- February 18 – Neil Gaudry, politician (born 1937)
- February 22 – Isidore Goresky, farm labourer, teacher and provincial politician (born 1902)
- March 3 – Gerhard Herzberg, physicist and physical chemist (born 1904)
- March 9 – Harry Somers, composer (born 1925)
- March 15 – Guy D'Artois, army officer (born 1917)
- March 23 – Osmond Borradaile, cameraman, cinematographer and veteran of First and Second World War (born 1898)
- March 24 – Edmund Tobin Asselin, politician (born 1920)

=== April to June ===
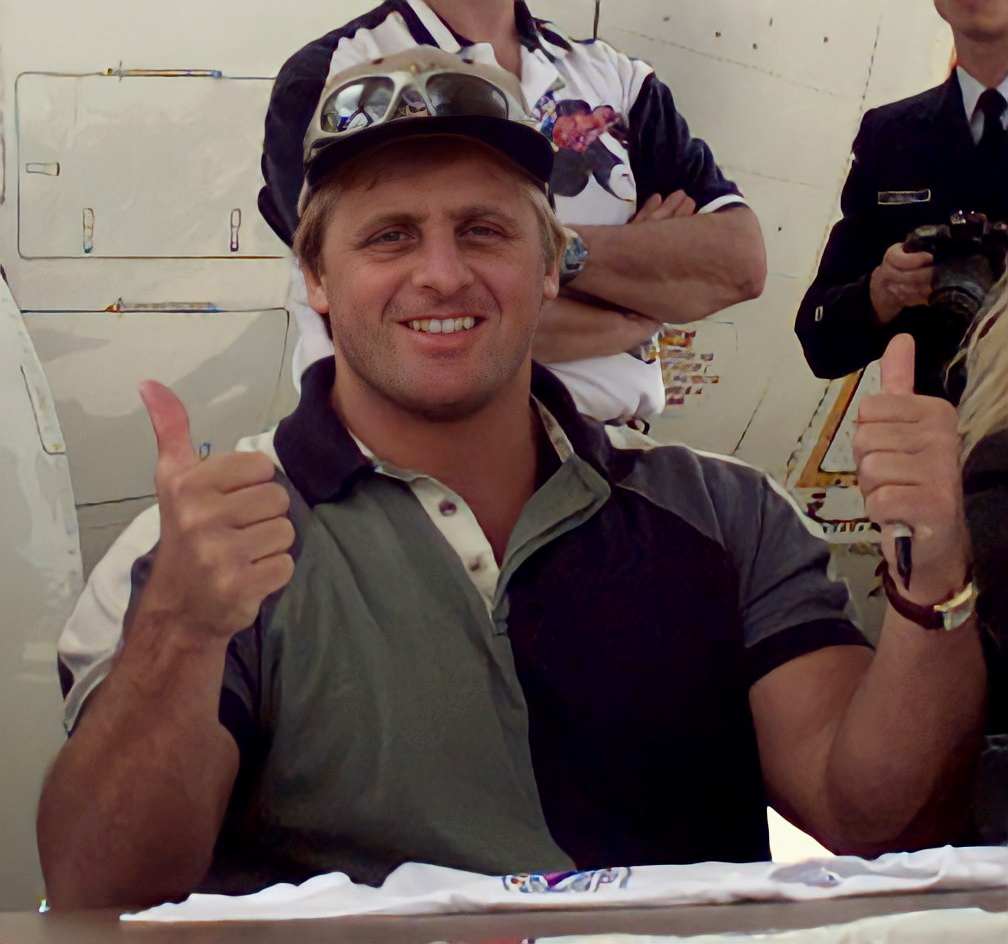
Owen Hart

- April 4 – Greg McConnell, indie rock musician (born 1964)
- April 5 – Paul David, cardiologist and founder of the Montreal Heart Institute (born 1919)
- May 2 – Douglas Harkness, politician, teacher, farmer and former Lieutenant-Colonel in the Royal Canadian Artillery. (born 1903)
- May 23 – Owen Hart, wrestler (born 1965)
- June 8 – Gordon Towers, politician and Lieutenant-Governor of Alberta (born 1919)
- June 17 – Stanley Faulder, murderer and first Canadian citizen to be executed in the United States since 1952 (born 1937)

=== July to December ===
- July 1 – Edward Dmytryk, Canadian-born American film director (born 1908)
- July 16 – Alan Macnaughton, politician (born 1903)
- August 12 – Jean Drapeau, lawyer, politician and Mayor of Montreal (born 1916)
- September 24 – Robert Bend, politician (born 1914)
- October 14 – Ian Wahn, politician and lawyer (born 1916)
- October 31 – Greg Moore, racecar driver (born 1975)
- December 2 – Matt Cohen, writer (born 1942)
- December 4 – Bert Hoffmeister, army officer (born 1907)
- December 10 – Rick Danko, musician and singer (born 1943)
- December 20 – Hank Snow, country music artist (born 1914)
- December 23 – Wallace Diestelmeyer, figure skater (born 1926)

== See also ==
- 1999 in Canadian television
- List of Canadian films of 1999
