= 1999 in Canadian television =

This is a list of Canadian television related events from 1999.

== Events ==
Date	Event
February 4	19th Genie Awards
March 7	Juno Awards of 1999
March 26	The renowned children's educational animated series Caillou premieres in Ireland for the very first time on RTÉ with the series airing on its second television station Network 2 as part of The Den.
March 29	Vidéotron launches digital cable in Montreal.
September 1	Launch of Canadian Learning Television and Report on Business Television.
October 1	After four months of airing on TVOntario, Shining Time Station begins airing in Saskatchewan for the very first time on SCN. The Canadian English- language cable television channel in the province of Saskatchewan will air the show once a day at noon from Monday to Friday. Only 44 episodes would be shown. The show will also continue airing on TVOntario until September 3, 2000.
November 7	1999 Gemini Awards
December 31	2000 Today appears to show the start of the new millennium.

=== Debuts ===
Show	Station	Premiere Date
Little Men	CTV	January 1
Total Recall 2070	CHCH-TV	January 5
Pit Pony	CBC Television	February 5
Dooley Gardens	CBC Television	March 3
CBC News: Morning	CBC Television	March 9
System Crash	YTV	March 14
Fibi's Funny Bones	Global	July 5
Twice in a Lifetime	CTV	August 25
Rainbow Fish	TVOntario	September 4
Cybersix	Teletoon	September 6
Redwall	Teletoon	September 8
Mona the Vampire	YTV	September 13
BeastMaster	Syndication	October 1
Toad Patrol	Teletoon	October 2
Hoze Houndz	Family Channel	October 4
Archibald the Koala	YTV	October 12
The City	CTV	Unknown

=== Ending this year ===
Show	Station	Cancelled
SketchCom	CBC Television	February 1
Black Harbour	CBC Television	February 5
Due South	CTV	March 14
Fibi's Funny Bones	Global	October 1
Ned's Newt	Teletoon	December 31
Adrienne Clarkson Presents	CBC Television	Unknown
Comics!	CBC Television	Unknown
La Course destination monde	Télévision de Radio-Canada	Unknown

=== Changes of network affiliation ===
Show	Moved From	Moved To
Timbuctoo	TFOU	TVOntario
Shining Time Station	YTV	TVOntario
Shining Time Station	TVOntario	SCN

== Television shows ==
=== 1950s ===
- Country Canada (1954–2007)
- Hockey Night in Canada (1952–present)
- The National (1954–present).

=== 1960s ===
- CTV National News (1961–present)
- Land and Sea (1964–present)
- Man Alive (1967–2000)
- The Nature of Things (1960–present, scientific documentary series)
- Question Period (1967–present, news program)
- W-FIVE (1966–present, newsmagazine program)

=== 1970s ===
- Canada AM (1972–present, news program)
- the fifth estate (1975–present, newsmagazine program)
- Marketplace (1972–present, newsmagazine program)
- 100 Huntley Street (1977–present, religious program)

=== 1980s ===
- CityLine (1987–present, news program)
- Fashion File (1989–2009)
- Just For Laughs (1988–present)
- Midday (1985–2000)
- On the Road Again (1987–2007)
- Venture (1985–2007)

=== 1990s ===
- Bob and Margaret (1998–2001)
- Cold Squad (1998–2005)
- Da Vinci's Inquest (1998–2005)
- Daily Planet (1995–present)
- eTalk (1995–present, entertainment newsmagazine program
- Emily of New Moon (1998–2000)
- La Femme Nikita (1997–2001)
- Life and Times (1996–2007)
- Made in Canada (1998–2003)
- Nothing Too Good for a Cowboy (1998-2000)
- The Passionate Eye (1993–present)
- Power Play (1998–2000)
- Riverdale (1997–2000)
- Royal Canadian Air Farce (1993–2008)
- The Red Green Show (1991–2006)
- This Hour Has 22 Minutes (1993–present)
- Traders (1996–2000)
- Twitch City (1998–2000)
- Wind at My Back (1996–2000)
- Witness (1992–2004)

== TV movies ==
- Milgaard
- My Gentleman Friends
- Win, Again!

== Births ==
Name	Notability
Gage Munroe	Actor (PAW Patrol)

== See also ==
- 1999 in Canada
- List of Canadian films of 1999
