= Under the Hood: A Voyage Into the World of Torture =

2008 Canadian documentary film

- French: Sous la cagoule, un voyage au bout de la torture
- Directed by: Patricio Henríquez
- Written by: Patricio Henríquez
- Produced by: Yves Bisaillon; Robert Cornellier; Patricio Henríquez; Colette Loumède; Raymonde Provencher
- Edited by: Andrea Henríquez
- Production companies: Macumba International; National Film Board of Canada
- Release date: March 2008
- Running time: 107 minutes
- Country: Canada
- Languages: English; French

Under the Hood: A Voyage Into the World of Torture (French: Sous la cagoule, un voyage au bout de la torture) is a Canadian documentary film, directed by Patricio Henríquez and released in 2008. Marking a transition between the focus on Chilean history in his earlier films and the more international focus of his later career, the film documents the use of torture as a tool of political and social oppression, both in historical contexts such as the military dictatorships in Chile, Argentina and Guatemala, and in the then-contemporary context of the Abu Ghraib and Guantanamo Bay detention camps during the early 2000s war on terror.

The film premiered at the 2008 Thessaloniki Documentary Festival, and had its Canadian premiere at the 2008 Vancouver International Film Festival.

The film won the Jutra Award for Best Documentary Film at the 11th Jutra Awards in 2009.
