= War Babies (2002 film) =

2002 Canadian documentary film

- French: War Babies, nés de la haine
- Directed by: Raymonde Provencher
- Written by: Raymonde Provencher
- Produced by: Robert Cornellier; Patricio Henríquez
- Cinematography: Robert Vanherweghem
- Edited by: Aube Foglia
- Music by: Robert Marcel Lepage
- Production company: Macumba International
- Distributed by: CinéFête
- Release date: November 2002 (RIDM)
- Running time: 92 minutes
- Country: Canada
- Languages: English; French

War Babies (French: War Babies, nés de la haine) is a Canadian documentary film, directed by Raymonde Provencher and released in 2002. Centred on the prevalence of rape as a tool of war, the film focuses in large part on Ryan, an adopted Canadian man who is travelling back to his birthplace in Bangladesh to learn more about his history as the product of a Pakistani soldier raping a Bangladeshi woman during the Bangladesh Liberation War.

The film also highlights the stories of Savera, a mother of seven children who were all murdered during the Rwandan genocide, who was then raped repeatedly when she tried to find safety; Nusreta, a Bosnian woman who was raped during the Yugoslav Wars in the 1990s; Mrs. Chung, a Korean woman who became pregnant when the Japanese army forced her into serving as a comfort woman during World War II. She had a son, who recently discovered his father's true Japanese identity; and Hailing, a young woman who was the product of her mother being raped by guerrillas during the Nicaraguan Revolution.

The film premiered in November 2002 at the Montreal International Documentary Festival, and had a brief theatrical run in Montreal in December, before being broadcast by Télé-Québec in February 2003 as an episode of the documentary series L'Œil ouvert.

== Awards ==
It was subsequently screened at the 2003 Hot Docs Canadian International Documentary Festival, where it was named the winner of the Hot Docs Audience Award.

It won four Gémeaux Awards in 2003, for Best Documentary, Best Research, Best Editing and Best Sound.

== Legacy ==
The film was slated to be screened in a retrospective of Provencher's films at Hot Docs in 2020. When the event was cancelled due to the COVID-19 pandemic, the retrospective was postponed instead of taking place as part of the online program, and instead was staged at the 2022 festival.
