= François Champoux =

Canadian neuroscientist

François Champoux (born 1977) is a Canadian audiologist, neuroscientist, and professor. He is a full professor at the School of Speech-Language Pathology and Audiology in the Faculty of Medicine at the University of Montreal, and co-holder of the Caroline Durand Foundation Chair in Hearing and Aging. His research has been reported in national and international media outlets, including Radio-Canada, Le Devoir, The Telegraph, the BBC, and NBC News, in relation to studies on auditory perception, deafness, brain plasticity, and multisensory integration. He has published more than 100 articles in peer-reviewed journals, indexed on PubMed.

== Media coverage and research themes ==
His work on deafness, sign language, and cochlear implantation has shown that introducing sign language to deaf children before and after cochlear implantation can support communication, cognition, and language development. He has also studied the role of hearing aids in reducing fall risk among adults with profound hearing loss, and the influence of visual input on auditory perception in cochlear implant users.

Another area of his research concerns brain plasticity and multisensory integration. He has examined the relationship between auditory processing and body representation, the contribution of multisensory training to body representation, as well as the effects of musical training on reaction times and multisensory performance. His studies on sensory substitution and neuroplasticity have also reported that blindness may enhance other sensory modalities.

== Personal life ==
Originally from Sorel-Tracy, François Champoux is the brother of documentary filmmaker Danic Champoux. Their familial connection has been noted in the media, and François Champoux appears in some of his brother's films.

== Selected publications ==
=== Articles ===
- Delcenserie A, Genesee F, Champoux F (2024). Delayed auditory experience results in past tense production difficulties and working memory deficits in children with cochlear implants: A comparison with children with developmental language disorder. Neuropsychologia, 196:108817. https://doi.org/10.1016/j.neuropsychologia.2024.108817
- Paromov D, Moïn-Darbari K*, Cedras AM*, Maheu M, Bacon BA, Champoux F (2024). Body representation drives auditory spatial perception. iScience – Cell Press, 27(3):109196. https://doi.org/10.1016/j.isci.2024.109196
- Delcenserie A, Genesee F, Champoux F (2024). Exposure to a sign language prior and after cochlear implantation increases language and cognitive skills in deaf children. Developmental Science, 27(4):e13481. https://doi.org/10.1111/desc.13481
- Behtani L, Paromov D*, Moïn-Darbari K*, Houde MS*, Bacon BA, Maheu M, Leroux T, Champoux F (2024). Hearing aid amplification improves postural control for older adults with hearing loss when other sensory cues are impoverished. Trends in Hearing, 28:23312165241232219. https://doi.org/10.1177/23312165241232219
- Delcenserie A, Genesee F, Champoux F (2021). The impact of early auditory experience for the acquisition of specific grammatical features and working memory. Cortex, 145:273-284. https://doi.org/10.1016/j.cortex.2021.09.014
- Landry SP, Champoux F (2017). Musicians react faster and are better multisensory integrators. Brain & Cognition, 111:156-162. https://doi.org/10.1016/j.bandc.2016.12.001
- Landry SP, Shiller DM, Champoux F (2013). Short-term visual deprivation improves the perception of harmonicity. Journal of Experimental Psychology: Human Perception and Performance, 39: 1503–1507. https://doi.org/10.1037/a0034015
- Landry SP, Guillemot JP, Champoux F (2013). Temporary deafness can impair multisensory integration: a study of cochlear implant users. Psychological Science, 24:1260-1268. https://doi.org/10.1177/0956797612471142
- Champoux F, Collignon O, Bacon BA, Lepore F, Zatorre RJ, Théoret H. (2011). Early-and late-onset blindness both curb audiotactile integration on the parchment-skin illusory task. Psychological Science, 22: 19–25. https://doi.org/10.1177/0956797610391099
- Champoux F, Lepore F, Gagné JP, Théoret H (2009). Visual stimuli can impair auditory processing in cochlear implant users. Neuropsychologia, 47: 17–22. https://doi.org/10.1016/j.neuropsychologia.2008.08.028

=== Books ===
- Champoux F (2025). Audition : Du son à la parole, des mécanismes sensoriels à la cognition. Éditions Champ de l’ours. ISBN 978-2-9823860-0-6
