= Images of a Dictatorship =

1998 Canadian documentary film

- Spanish: Imageries de una dictatur
- Directed by: Patricio Henríquez
- Written by: Patricio Henríquez
- Produced by: Robert Cornellier; Raymonde Provencher; Patricio Henríquez
- Cinematography: Raul Cuevas
- Edited by: Jean-Marie Drot
- Music by: Robert Marcel Lepage
- Production company: Macumba International
- Release date: August 28, 1999 (MWFF)
- Running time: 56 minutes
- Country: Canada
- Language: Spanish

Images of a Dictatorship (Spanish: Imageries de una dictatur) is a Canadian documentary film, directed by Patricio Henríquez and released in 1999. Culled from the archives of Chilean news videographer Raul Cuevas, the film is a portrait of life in Chile during the military dictatorship of Augusto Pinochet.

The film premiered at the 1999 Montreal World Film Festival. It was subsequently screened at the 2000 Hot Docs Canadian International Documentary Festival, where it won the award for Best Political Documentary.

The film won the Jutra Award for Best Documentary Film at the 2nd Jutra Awards in 2000, as well as that year's M. Joan Chalmers Documentarian Award for Film and Video.
