= The Invisible Nation =

- French: Le Peuple invisible
- Directed by: Richard Desjardins; Robert Monderie
- Written by: Richard Desjardins; Robert Monderie
- Produced by: Colette Loumède
- Cinematography: Alain Dupras
- Edited by: Dominic Rioual
- Music by: Claude Fradette
- Production company: National Film Board of Canada
- Release date: October 27, 2007 (FCIAT)
- Running time: 93 minutes
- Country: Canada
- Languages: French; English; Algonquian

The Invisible Nation (French: Le Peuple invisible) is a Canadian documentary film, directed by Richard Desjardins and Robert Monderie, and released in 2007. The film profiles the cultural and social challenges facing the Algonquin First Nations of Ontario.

The film premiered as the opening film of the 2007 Abitibi-Témiscamingue International Film Festival.

It was the winner of the Jutra Award for Best Documentary Film at the 10th Jutra Awards in 2008.
