= Has God Forsaken Africa? =

- Directed by: Musa Dieng Kala
- Screenplay by: Musa Dieng Kala
- Produced by: Colette Loumède; Christian Medawar
- Cinematography: Alex Margineanu
- Edited by: Marie Hamelin
- Music by: Musa Dieng Kala
- Production company: National Film Board of Canada
- Distributed by: National Film Board of Canada
- Release date: 2008
- Running time: 52 minutes
- Country: Canada

Has God Forsaken Africa? (original French title: Dieu a-t-il quitté l’Afrique?) is a Canadian 2008 documentary film.

== Synopsis ==
Brussels, August 1999. Two teenagers from Guinea are found dead in the landing gear of a plane arriving from Conakry. Each year, thousands of young Africans risk their lives to flee the African continent. Shocked by this phenomenon, the Senegalese-born director Musa Dieng Kala returns to Dakar to try to understand why they do it. He films five young adults seeking to immigrate to the West at any cost reflecting the international indifference, the indifference of the African leaders and a society with no resources.

== Awards ==
- SCIC Global Issues Award, Yorkton Film Festival, 2009
- Bank of Africa Special Prize, Panafrican Film and Television Festival of Ouagadougou, Burkina Faso, 2009
- AQCC Award for the Best Short or Medium Length Documentary, Rendez-vous du cinéma québécois, 2009
