= Louis-Philippe Dury =

Canadian actor (born 1992)

Louis-Philippe Dury (born June 23, 1992) is a film and television actor from Quebec.

== Filmography ==
=== Film ===
- 2001 : Ice Cream, Chocolate and Other Consolations (Crème glacée, chocolat et autres consolations) as Jérémi
- 2003 : Seducing Doctor Lewis (La Grande Séduction) as Jules Auger
- 2004 : Machine Gun Molly (Monica la mitraille) as Maurice
- 2006 : The Rip-Off as a child
- 2006 : La Belle Empoisonneuse as Homère

=== Television ===
- 2002-2003 : My best enemy (Mon meilleur ennemi) as Simon, son of Claire
- 2006 : Providence as a schoolboy
- 2007 : Our summers (Nos étés) as Bengamin Forget
