= A Woman, My Mother =

2019 Canadian documentary film

- Film poster
- French: Une femme, ma mère
- Directed by: Claude Demers
- Written by: Claude Demers
- Produced by: Claude Demers
- Cinematography: Olivier Tétreault; Stéphanie Weber Biron
- Edited by: Natalie Lamoureux
- Music by: Sei Nakauchi Pelletier
- Production company: Les Films de L'Autre
- Distributed by: K Films Amérique
- Release date: November 21, 2019 (RIDM)
- Running time: 100 minutes
- Country: Canada
- Language: French

A Woman, My Mother (French: Une femme, ma mère) is a Canadian documentary film, directed by Claude Demers and released in 2019. The film documents Demers's efforts to learn more about his birth mother, who gave him up for adoption; although they did meet in adulthood, she subsequently died before being able to tell him very much about her own life, leaving him with many gaps in his understanding that he could fill in only with imaginative speculation.

The film premiered in November 2019 at the Montreal International Documentary Festival, where it won the award for Best Canadian Feature. It went into theatrical release in Quebec in early 2020, and was screened as part of the 2020 Hot Docs Canadian International Documentary Festival.

The film received two Prix Iris nominations at the 22nd Quebec Cinema Awards in 2020, for Best Editing in a Documentary (Natalie Lamoureux) and Best Sound in a Documentary (Luc Boudrias and Patrice LeBlanc). At the 9th Canadian Screen Awards in 2021, it was nominated for Best Documentary and Best Editing in a Documentary (Lamoureux), and Lamoureux won the award for editing.
