= Natalie Lamoureux =

Canadian film editor

Natalie Lamoureux is a Canadian film editor. She is most noted for her work on the film A Woman, My Mother (Une femme, ma mère), for which she won the Canadian Screen Award for Best Editing in a Documentary at the 9th Canadian Screen Awards in 2021, and was a Prix Iris nominee for Best Editing in a Documentary at the 22nd Quebec Cinema Awards in 2020.

Her other credits have included the films Ice Cream, Chocolate and Other Consolations (Crème glacée, chocolat et autres consolations), Mourning for Anna (Trois temps après la mort d'Anna), Silence Lies (Tromper le silence), Waiting for Spring (En attendant le printemps), What Are We Doing Here? (Qu’est-ce qu’on fait ici ?), Waseskun, Those Who Come, Will Hear (Ceux qui viendront, entendront), Far from Bashar (Loin de Bachar), Kenbe la, Until We Win (Kenbe la, jusqu'à la victoire), I Might Be Dead by Tomorrow (Tant que j'ai du respir dans le corps), Beneath the Surface (Le Lac des hommes), Diary of a Father (Journal d'un père), These Wild Cats (Des chats sauvages) and Seeing Through the Darkness (Les yeux ne font pas le regard).

She received another Canadian Screen Award nomination for Best Editing in a Documentary at the 10th Canadian Screen Awards in 2022, for I Might Be Dead by Tomorrow.
