= Seeing Through the Darkness =

- French: Les yeux ne font pas le regard
- Directed by: Simon Plouffe
- Written by: Simon Plouffe
- Produced by: Simon Plouffe
- Cinematography: Simon Plouffe
- Edited by: Natalie Lamoureux
- Production company: Les Films de l'autre
- Distributed by: Les Films du 3 mars
- Release date: November 22, 2024 (RIDM)
- Running time: 93 minutes
- Country: Canada
- Languages: Spanish; Russian; Japanese; German; Serbo-Croatian; Ukrainian

Seeing Through the Darkness (French: Les yeux ne font pas le regard) is a Canadian documentary film, directed by Simon Plouffe and released in 2024. The film profiles several people from around the world who have been left visually impaired or blind in armed conflict, documenting their reflections on their experiences of losing their sight and having to adapt to a new way of living.

It additionally conveys the experience of becoming visually impaired by using various cinematographic techniques, such as blurring, ghosting, doubling and mirroring, to disrupt and distort the film's visuals and heighten the impact of its sound design.

Plouffe first announced production on the film in 2021.

The film premiered at the Montreal International Documentary Festival in 2024, before going into commercial release in 2025.

== Accolades ==
Award	Date of ceremony	Category	Recipient	Result	Ref.
Canadian Screen Awards	2026	Best Sound Design in a Documentary	Simon Plouffe	Nominated	
