= Beneath the Surface (2021 film) =

2021 Canadian documentary film

- French: Le Lac des hommes
- Directed by: Marie-Geneviève Chabot
- Written by: Marie-Geneviève Chabot
- Produced by: Marie-Geneviève Chabot
- Starring: Laurent Sirois; Jean-Pierre Sirois; Stéphane Sirois; Jérôme Sirois
- Cinematography: Karine van Ameringen
- Edited by: Natalie Lamoureux
- Production company: Les Films de l'autre
- Distributed by: Les Films du 3 mars
- Release date: April 30, 2021 (RVQC)
- Running time: 75 minutes
- Country: Canada
- Language: French

Beneath the Surface (French: Le Lac des hommes, lit. 'The Lake of Men') is a Canadian documentary film, directed by Marie-Geneviève Chabot and released in 2021. An exploration of modern masculinity, the film centres on Laurent Sirois, a man who is on a fishing trip with his sons Jean-Pierre, Stéphane and Jérôme, who are all dealing with their complicated relationship after his separation and divorce from their mother largely removed him from their childhood.

The film premiered at the 2021 Rendez-vous Québec Cinéma. It was later screened at the 2022 Canadian Film Festival, where Chabot won the DGC Ontario award for best director, and at the 2022 Festival de films d’auteurs de Val-Morin.

It went into commercial release in June 2022.

== Critical response ==
André Lavoie of Le Devoir compared the film to The Shimmering Beast (La Bête lumineuse), Pierre Perrault's influential 1982 documentary about male friendship on a hunting trip.
