= The Hole Story =

2011 documentary film and web documentary

- French: Trou Story
- Directed by: Richard Desjardins; Robert Monderie
- Written by: Richard Desjardins
- Produced by: Colette Loumède
- Narrated by: Richard Desjardins
- Cinematography: Alain Dupras; Marc Gadoury
- Edited by: Hélène Girard
- Music by: René Lussier
- Production company: National Film Board of Canada
- Release date: November 4, 2011
- Running time: 79 minutes
- Country: Canada
- Language: French

The Hole Story (French: Trou story) is a 2011 documentary film and web documentary directed by Richard Desjardins and Robert Monderie about mining in Canada and its impact on the environment and workers' health. The film focuses primarily on the mining communities of the Northeastern Ontario and Abitibi-Témiscamingue regions, including Sudbury, Timmins, Cobalt, Rouyn-Noranda, Val-d'Or and Malartic.

The film includes interviews with figures such as federal Member of Parliament Charlie Angus, former Ontario MPP Elie Martel, former Sudbury mayor John Rodriguez, Rouyn-Noranda mayor Mario Provencher and former Val-d'Or mayor and Quebec MNA André Pelletier.

Produced by the National Film Board of Canada, the film had its world premiere in October 2011 at the Abitibi-Témiscamingue International Film Festival, before opening in Quebec theatres.
