= The Dark Side of the White Lady =

2006 Canadian documentary film

- Spanish: El lado obscuro de la dama blanca
- Directed by: Patricio Henríquez
- Written by: Patricio Henríquez
- Produced by: Colette Loumède
- Cinematography: Raul Cuevas; Rénald Bellemare; Sylvestre Guidi; Ricardo Correa; Patricio Henríquez
- Edited by: Michel Grou
- Music by: Robert Marcel Lepage
- Production company: National Film Board of Canada
- Release date: May 2, 2006 (Hot Docs)
- Running time: 52 minutes
- Country: Canada
- Language: Spanish

The Dark Side of the White Lady (Spanish: El lado obscuro de la dama blanca) is a Canadian documentary film, directed by Patricio Henríquez and released in 2006. The film centres on the Esmeralda, a tall ship of the Chilean Navy which is seen as an important national symbol of Chile, but has a darker history of having been used as a prison ship for political prisoners during the dictatorship of Augusto Pinochet.

The film premiered at the 2006 Hot Docs Canadian International Documentary Festival, before going into wider commercial distribution in late 2006 and early 2007. When the Esmeralda made a visit to Quebec City in 2009, the film received a special television broadcast on Télé-Québec.

The film was shortlisted for the Jutra Award for Best Documentary Film at the 9th Jutra Awards in 2007.
