= Canadian Screen Award for Best Sound Design in a Documentary =

Annual Canadian film award

- Country: Canada
- Presented by: Academy of Canadian Cinema & Television
- First award: 2023
- Currently held by: Andrew Zukerman for Endless Cookie (2025)
- Website: academy.ca/awards

The Canadian Screen Award for Best Sound Design in a Documentary is an annual award, presented by the Academy of Canadian Cinema and Television. It is presented as part of the Canadian Screen Awards program, to honour the best sound in a feature documentary film. Unlike the awards for narrative feature films, which are separated into two distinct categories for Best Sound Editing and Best Sound Mixing, there is only a single category for documentary films considering all aspects of sound design.

The award was presented for the first time at the 12th Canadian Screen Awards in 2024.

== 2020s ==
Year	Nominees	Film	Ref
2023; 12th Canadian Screen Awards
2023; 12th Canadian Screen Awards	Sam Rodgers, James Lazarenko, Claire Dobson, Krystin Hunter, Graham Rogers, Jane Tattersall, Stefana Fratila, Paul Germann, Steve Medeiros, Marilee Yorston, Steve Hammond, David Yonson, Steve Copley	Swan Song	
2023; 12th Canadian Screen Awards	Sylvain Bellemare, Isabelle Lussier	Days (Les jours)	
2023; 12th Canadian Screen Awards	Brian Eimer	Jane Goodall: Reasons for Hope	
2023; 12th Canadian Screen Awards	Hans Laitres, Sylvain Bellemare, Daniel Capeille	The White Guard (La Garde blanche)	
2023; 12th Canadian Screen Awards	Catherine Van Der Donckt, Stéphane Cadotte, Jean Paul Vialard, Geoffrey Mitchell	Beyond Paper (Au-delà du papier)	
2024; 13th Canadian Screen Awards
2024; 13th Canadian Screen Awards	Marie-Pierre Grenier, Camille Demers-Lambert, Nataq Huault, Olivier Germain, Alexis Farand	Okurimono	
2024; 13th Canadian Screen Awards	Benoît Dame, Catherine Van Der Donckt	Yintah	
2024; 13th Canadian Screen Awards	Alex Lane	Intercepted	
2024; 13th Canadian Screen Awards	Patrice LeBlanc, Luc Boudrias	Diary of a Father (Journal d'un père)	
2024; 13th Canadian Screen Awards	David Rose	Wilfred Buck	
2025; 14th Canadian Screen Awards
2025; 14th Canadian Screen Awards	Andrew Zukerman	Endless Cookie	
2025; 14th Canadian Screen Awards	Sylvain Brassard	Spare My Bones, Coyote! (Mais où va-t-on, coyote?)	
2025; 14th Canadian Screen Awards	Eli Haligua, Blair Moog, Fatih Ragbet, Gulay Acar	Fairy Creek	
2025; 14th Canadian Screen Awards	Gregor Phillips, D'wayne Murray, Ramsay Bourquin, May Guimarães, Alex Macia, Devon Quelch, Jake Kerr, Peter Robinson	Saints and Warriors	
2025; 14th Canadian Screen Awards	Simon Plouffe	Seeing Through the Darkness (Les yeux ne font pas le regard)	

== See also ==
- Prix Iris for Best Sound in a Documentary
