= What Are We Doing =

What Are We Doing may refer to:

- "What Are We Doing", a song by The Kinks from UK Jive (1989)
- "What Are We Doing", a song by B.o.B. from Strange Clouds (2012)
- "What Are We Doing", a song by Danielle Bradbery from I Don't Believe We've Met (2017)

== See also ==
- What Are We Doing Here? (disambiguation)
