= Claudine Sauvé =

Canadian cinematographer

Claudine Sauvé is a Canadian cinematographer. She is most noted for her work on the films The Wild Hunt, for which she was a Genie Award nominee for Best Cinematography at the 31st Genie Awards, and Silence Lies (Tromper le silence), for which she was a Jutra Award nominee for Best Cinematography at the 11th Jutra Awards.

Her other credits have included the films Ice Cream, Chocolate and Other Consolations (Crème glacée, chocolat et autres consolations), Posers, The High Cost of Living, The Year Dolly Parton Was My Mom, Liverpool, Miraculum, What Are We Doing Here? (Qu’est-ce qu’on fait ici ?), 1:54, 9, Happy Face, Best Sellers, You Will Be Free (Ma fille tu seras libre) and 111 Echoes from Halifax.
