= Luc Côté =

Montreal-based film-maker

- Occupation: film-maker

Luc Côté is a Montreal-based film-maker. You Don't Like the Truth, a film he co-directed with frequent collaborator Patricio Henríquez won the best documentary about society award at the first Gémeaux Awards in 2011.
