= Those Who Come, Will Hear =

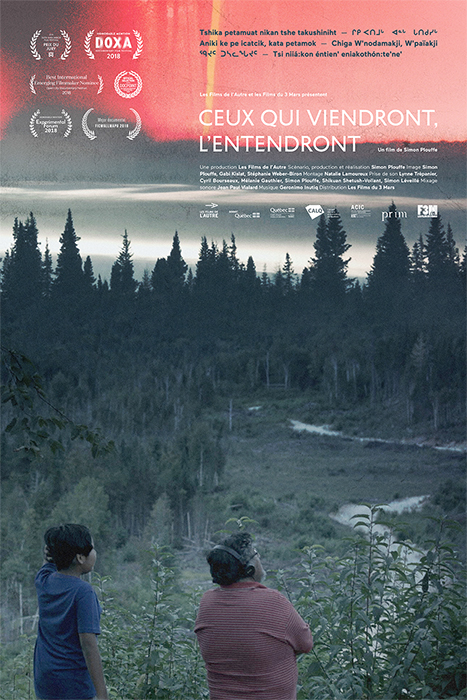
- Film poster
- French: Ceux qui viendront, l'entendront
- Directed by: Simon Plouffe
- Written by: Joséphine Bacon; Simon Plouffe
- Produced by: Simon Plouffe
- Cinematography: Gabi Kislat; Simon Plouffe; Stéphanie Weber Biron
- Edited by: Natalie Lamoureux
- Music by: Geronimo Inutiq
- Production company: Les Films de l'Autre
- Distributed by: Les Films du 3 mars
- Release date: March 23, 2018 (Ann Arbor)
- Running time: 77 minutes
- Country: Canada
- Languages: English; French; Abenaki; Atikamekw; Innu; Inuttitut; Kanienkehaka; Naskapi

Those Who Come, Will Hear (French: Ceux qui viendront, l'entendront) is a Canadian documentary film, directed by Simon Plouffe and released in 2018. A meditation on the importance of language in the maintenance of Indigenous Canadian culture and tradition, the film documents the day-to-day life of various First Nations and Inuit communities in Quebec where indigenous languages are spoken, sometimes fluently and sometimes in code switching to English or French.

The film premiered at the 2018 Ann Arbor Film Festival. It had its Canadian premiere at the DOXA Documentary Film Festival, where it received an honorable mention from the Colin Low Award jury.

The film's sound team (Cyril Bourseaux, Mélanie Gauthier, Simon Léveillé, Simon Plouffe, Lynne Trépanier, Jean Paul Vialard and Shikuan Shetush Vollant) won the Prix Iris for Best Sound in a Documentary at the 21st Quebec Cinema Awards in 2019.
