= Stefana Fratila =

Canadian sound effects editor

Stefana Fratila is a Romanian-Canadian artist, composer, and sound effects editor, who was a winner of the Canadian Screen Award for Best Sound Editing at the 10th Canadian Screen Awards in 2022 for Scarborough and the Canadian Screen Award for Best Sound Design in a Documentary at the 12th Canadian Screen Awards for Swan Song (2023 film).
