= Claude Demers =

Canadian filmmaker

Claude Demers (born March 10, 1962) is a Canadian filmmaker from Montreal, Quebec. He is most noted for his series of documentary films that were indirectly inspired by, or directly about, his experiences as an adoptee.

The birth son of an Italian Canadian father and a québécois mother, he was placed for adoption in infancy.This biographical element is the main source of inspiration for much of his cinema.

In addition to directing his films, he is also the screenwriter.

He directed a number of short films before releasing his feature debut, The Invention of Love (L'Invention de l'amour), in 2000. He began his foray into documentary films inspired by his birth heritage in 2006 with Barbers: A Men's Story (Barbiers, Une histoire d'hommes), a film about the culture of Italian Canadian barbers in Montreal; he followed up in 2009 with Ladies in Blue (Les dames en bleu), a film about women of his birth mother's generation who idolized pop chansonnier Michel Louvain.

Where I'm From (D'ou je viens), released in 2014, began a series of much more personal films that more directly confronted his own experiences as an adoptee. This series continued in 2019 with A Woman, My Mother (Une femme, ma mère), which addressed some of the unanswered questions he still had about his birth mother's life, and in 2024 with Diary of a Father (Journal d'un père), which addressed the impact of both his birth and adoptive fathers on his own sense of fatherhood as parent to a daughter he cannot see as often as he would like, as she lives in another country with her mother.

== Filmography ==
- The Invention of Love (L'Invention de l'amour) - 2000
- Barbers: A Men's Story (Barbiers, Une histoire d'hommes) - 2006
- Ladies in Blue (Les dames en bleu) - 2009
- Where I'm From (D'ou je viens) - 2014
- My Last Summer (Mon dernier été) - 2016
- A Woman, My Mother (Une femme, ma mère) - 2019
- Diary of a Father (Journal d'un père) - 2023

== Awards ==
Award	Year	Category	Work	Result	Ref(s)
Genie Awards/Canadian Screen Awards	2010	Best Feature Length Documentary	Ladies in Blue (Les dames en bleu)	Nominated	
Genie Awards/Canadian Screen Awards	2021	Best Feature Length Documentary	A Woman, My Mother (Une femme, ma mère)	Nominated	
Genie Awards/Canadian Screen Awards	2025	Best Cinematography in a Documentary	Diary of a Father (Journal d'un père) with Olivier Tétreault, François Messier-Rheault	Nominated	
Festival international du cinéma francophone en Acadie	2016	Best Canadian Short Film	My Last Summer (Mon dernier été)	Won	
Montreal International Documentary Festival	2019	Grand Prize, National Feature	A Woman, My Mother (Une femme, ma mère)	Won	
