= These Wild Cats =

- French: Des chats sauvages
- Directed by: Steve Patry
- Written by: Steve Patry
- Produced by: Steve Patry
- Cinematography: Steve Patry
- Edited by: Natalie Lamoureux
- Music by: Bertrand Blessing
- Production company: Les Films de l'autre
- Distributed by: Les Films du 3 mars
- Release date: November 24, 2024 (RIDM)
- Running time: 77 minutes
- Country: Canada
- Language: French

These Wild Cats (French: Des chats sauvages) is a Canadian documentary film, directed by Steve Patry and released in 2024. The film profiles Martin, a hermit in the Abitibi-Témiscamingue region of Quebec who lives an isolated existence in a forest cabin with a large pack of cats, but whose life of predictable routine is upset when one of the cats goes missing.

The film premiered at the Montreal International Documentary Festival in 2024, and went into commercial release in September 2025.

The film was shortlisted for the Prix collégial du cinéma québécois in 2026.
