= Simon Plouffe (filmmaker) =

Canadian filmmaker

Simon Plouffe is a Canadian documentary filmmaker and sound editor from Rouyn-Noranda, Quebec, most noted for his films Those Who Come, Will Hear (Ceux qui viendront, l'entendront) and Seeing Through the Darkness (Les yeux ne font pas le regard).

As a documentarian, he concentrates principally on films where sound design is central to the production, with Those Who Come, Will Hear focusing on the spoken languages of Indigenous Canadian communities, and Seeing Through the Darkness centred on the role of sound in the lives of people who are visually impaired. He has also had numerous sound design and editing credits on both narrative and documentary films by other filmmakers.

== Filmography ==
- L'analphabète aveuglé - 2006
- Le goût des plumes - 2007
- Others' Gold (L'Or des autres) - 2011
- Those Who Come, Will Hear (Ceux qui viendront, l'entendront) - 2018
- Forests (Forêts) - 2022
- Seeing Through the Darkness (Les yeux ne font pas le regard) - 2024

== Awards ==
| Award | Date of ceremony | Category | Work | Result | Ref. |
|---|---|---|---|---|---|
| DOXA Documentary Film Festival | 2018 | Colin Low Award | Those Who Come, Will Hear (Ceux qui vont, l'entendront) | Honored | |
| Prix Iris | 2019 | Best Sound in a Documentary | Those Who Come, Will Hear (Ceux qui vont, l'entendront) with Cyril Bourseaux, Mélanie Gauthier, Simon Léveillé, Lynne Trépanier, Jean Paul Vialard and Shikuan Shetush Vollant | Won | |
| Canadian Screen Awards | 2026 | Best Sound Design in a Documentary | Seeing Through the Darkness (Les yeux ne font pas le regard) | Nominated | |
