= Far from Bashar =

2020 Canadian documentary film

- French: Loin de Bachar
- Directed by: Pascal Sanchez
- Written by: Pascal Sanchez
- Produced by: Nathalie Cloutier
- Starring: Adnan al-Mahamied; Basmah Issa
- Cinematography: Pascal Sanchez
- Edited by: Natalie Lamoureux
- Music by: Sei Nakauchi Pelletier
- Production company: National Film Board of Canada
- Release date: September 25, 2020
- Running time: 73 minutes
- Country: Canada
- Languages: Arabic; French; English

Far from Bashar (French: Loin de Bachar) is a Canadian documentary film, directed by Pascal Sanchez and released in 2020. The film profiles Adnan al-Mahamied and Basmah Issa, a married couple from Syria who have been living in Montreal since moving to Canada as refugees after participating in the uprisings against Syrian president Bashar al-Assad.

The film premiered on September 25, 2020, at the Cinémathèque québécoise.
