= I Might Be Dead by Tomorrow =

- French: Tant que j'ai du respir dans le corps
- Directed by: Steve Patry
- Written by: Steve Patry
- Produced by: Steve Patry
- Cinematography: Steve Patry
- Edited by: Natalie Lamoureux
- Music by: Bertrand Blessing
- Production company: Les Films de l'Autre
- Distributed by: Les Films du 3 mars
- Release date: September 19, 2020 (FCVQ)
- Running time: 75 minutes
- Country: Canada
- Languages: English; French

I Might Be Dead by Tomorrow (French: Tant que j'ai du respir dans le corps, lit. "As Long As I Have Breath in My Body") is a Canadian documentary film, directed by Steve Patry and released in 2020. The film is a portrait of homelessness in Montreal, profiling both homeless people and the front-line workers who try to help them.

The film premiered on September 19, 2020 at the Quebec City Film Festival.

The film received a Prix Iris nomination for Best Documentary Film at the 23rd Quebec Cinema Awards in 2021.

Natalie Lamoureux received a Canadian Screen Award nomination for Best Editing in a Documentary at the 10th Canadian Screen Awards in 2022.
