= Ice Cream, Chocolate and Other Consolations =

- French: Crème glacée, chocolat et autres consolations
- Directed by: Julie Hivon
- Written by: Julie Hivon
- Produced by: Marcel Giroux; Julie Hivon
- Starring: Isabelle Brouillette; Danny Gilmore; Louis-Philippe Dury
- Cinematography: Claudine Sauvé
- Edited by: Natalie Lamoureux
- Music by: Martin Allard; Stéphane Bergeron
- Production companies: GPA Films; Les Films de L'Autre
- Distributed by: Cinéma Libre
- Release date: August 23, 2001 (MWFF)
- Running time: 97 minutes
- Country: Canada
- Language: French

Ice Cream, Chocolate and Other Consolations (French: Crème glacée, chocolat et autres consolations) is a Canadian romantic comedy-drama film, directed by Julie Hivon and released in 2001. The film centres on Suzie (Isabelle Brouillette), an aimless woman in her mid-20s with a dead-end job and little success in her love life, whose efforts to help her apparently abused young neighbour Jérémi (Louis-Philippe Dury) lead her to confront what she wants out of life, including the real reasons why she is always comparing her boyfriends to her childhood friend Samuel (Danny Gilmore).

The film's cast also includes Jacynthe René as Suzie and Samuel's friend Judith, France Castel and Serge Thériault as Suzie's parents Nicole and Renaud, and Dorothée Berryman as Samuel's mother Micheline, as well as Normand D'Amour, Martin Desgagné, Geneviève Bilodeau and Pierre Lebeau in supporting roles.

The film premiered on August 24, 2001 at the Montreal World Film Festival, before opening commercially on August 31.

Castel received a Jutra Award nomination for Best Supporting Actress at the 4th Jutra Awards in 2002.
