= The Last Nataq =

- French: Le dernier Nataq
- Directed by: Lisette Marcotte
- Written by: Lisette Marcotte
- Produced by: Lisette Marcotte
- Starring: Richard Desjardins
- Cinematography: Virgil Héroux-Laferté
- Edited by: Lisette Marcotte
- Music by: Richard Desjardins
- Production company: Les Productions La vie devant sol
- Release date: October 30, 2019 (FCIAT)
- Running time: 75 minutes
- Country: Canada
- Language: French

The Last Nataq (French: Le dernier Nataq) is a Canadian documentary film, directed by Lisette Marcotte and released in 2019. The film is a portrait of Québécois singer-songwriter Richard Desjardins, exploring both his life and the impact of his upbringing in Rouyn-Noranda on the themes and values expressed in his work.

The film premiered at the Abitibi-Témiscamingue International Film Festival in 2019, and was screened at the 2020 edition of the Rendez-Vous French Film Festival in Vancouver, British Columbia. Due to the COVID-19 pandemic in Quebec, its planned theatrical release in 2020 was delayed, with the film having its commercial opening on April 21, 2021.
