= Ladies in Blue =

2009 Canadian documentary film

- French: Les dames en bleu
- Directed by: Claude Demers
- Written by: Claude Demers
- Produced by: Claude Demers
- Starring: Michel Louvain
- Cinematography: Michel La Veaux; Jean-Pierre St-Louis
- Edited by: Claude Palardy
- Production company: CDFilms
- Distributed by: Christal Films
- Release date: October 7, 2009 (FNC)
- Running time: 88 minutes
- Country: Canada
- Language: French

Ladies in Blue (French: Les dames en bleu) is a Canadian documentary film, directed by Claude Demers and released in 2009. The film is a portrait of five women of varying ages who are passionate fans of Quebec singer Michel Louvain.

The film received a Genie Award nomination for Best Feature Length Documentary at the 30th Genie Awards in 2010.
