= Julie Hivon =

Canadian film and television director

Julie Hivon is a Canadian film and television director and screenwriter from Granby, Quebec.

A graduate of the Université du Québec à Montréal, she directed a number of short films before releasing her full-length debut film, Ice Cream, Chocolate and Other Consolations (Crème glacée, chocolat et autres consolations), in 2001. She followed up with the films Silence Lies (Tromper le silence) in 2010, and What Are We Doing Here? (Qu’est-ce qu’on fait ici ?) in 2014.

She subsequently wrote for several television series before creating the drama series Nuit blanche in 2021.

== Filmography ==
- Baiser d'enfant - 1995
- Dans le parc avec toi - 1997
- Ice Cream, Chocolate and Other Consolations (Crème glacée, chocolat et autres consolations) - 2001
- Silence Lies (Tromper le silence) - 2010
- La Chambre no 13 - 2006, television series
- What Are We Doing Here? (Qu’est-ce qu’on fait ici ?) - 2014
- Au secours de Béatrice - 2015-16, television series (five episodes)
- Alertes - 2021, television series (one episode)
- Nuit blanche - 2021
