= Self(less) Portrait =

- French: Autoportrait sans moi
- Directed by: Danic Champoux
- Produced by: Virginie Léger
- Cinematography: Jean-Pierre St-Louis
- Edited by: René Roberge
- Production company: National Film Board of Canada
- Release date: January 14, 2014
- Running time: 98 minutes
- Country: Canada
- Language: French

Self(less) Portrait (French: Autoportrait sans moi) is a Canadian documentary film, directed by Danic Champoux and released in 2014. The film features 50 people talking about various aspects of their lives, both positive and negative.

Kevin Scott of Exclaim! reviewed the film negatively, writing that "just because we all have stories doesn't mean they're all necessarily worth committing to film."

The film was a Jutra Award nominee for Best Documentary Film at the 17th Jutra Awards in 2015.
