= Aron Tager =

American actor and poet (1934–2019)

- Born: June 30, 1934
- Died: February 28, 2019 (aged 84); Toronto, Ontario, Canada
- Occupations: Actor; poet; artist; sculptor
- Years active: 1950–2019
- Spouse: Ann Page
- Website: arontagerart.wix.com/arontager

Aron Tager (June 30, 1934 – February 28, 2019) was an American actor, poet, artist and sculptor, he is best known for voicing Cranky Kong in the animated television series, Donkey Kong Country and for portraying Dr. Vink on the children's television show Are You Afraid of the Dark?.

== Career ==
As an artist, Tager had numerous exhibitions of his work and has sculptures installed at the following locations: Mount Anthony Union High School (Bennington, Vermont); Shaftsbury Elementary School (Shaftsbury, Vermont); Delaware County Community College, (Media, Pennsylvania); and the Indianapolis Jewish Center, Battery Park (Burlington, Vermont).

He has earned a number of accolades for his work, including the Gold Key at the National Scholastic Art Competition in 1950, the 1975 Award and Medal at the Norwich University Art Show for "Best Sculpture" and "Most Popular Work in Show", and the Award and Medal, Boston Festival of the Arts, 1985.

Trained as an actor, Tager took a 25-year hiatus to focus solely on art, particularly painting and sculpture, before returning to acting in the early 1990s. He appeared in a variety of theatrical, television and film productions, and has had parts in the movies X-Men, Rocky Marciano, Serendipity, Murder at 1600, 10,000 Black Men Named George, A Holiday Romance, and The Salem Witch Trials.

A member of the repertory cast of the A&E TV series A Nero Wolfe Mystery (2001–2002), he has also appeared on the television shows At the Hotel, Kojak, Puppets Who Kill, Are You Afraid of the Dark?, Monk, Goosebumps, Wild Card, Sirens, Earth: Final Conflict, Lil' Bush, Psi Factor: Chronicles of the Paranormal, Due South, Wonderfalls, Blue Murder, Relic Hunter, The Zack Files and Billable Hours. He played Max Coleman in the 2002 made-for-TV movie Martin and Lewis.

A long-time resident of Toronto, Ontario, Canada, he appeared in television commercials and occasionally performed voices for characters in animated films, children's and adult shows such as Donkey Kong Country, Blazing Dragons, Adventures of the Little Mermaid, The Busy World of Richard Scarry, Monster Force, David Copperfield, Stickin' Around, The Adventures of Sam & Max: Freelance Police, Silver Surfer, Tommy and the Wildcat, George Shrinks, Adventures in Animation 3D, Jane and the Dragon, The Dating Guy, The Adventures of Chuck and Friends.

== Personal life ==
Tager was married to Ann Page, who was also an actress. They remained married until his death.

== Death ==
Tager died on February 28, 2019, at the age of 84 in Toronto, Ontario, Canada. His wife Ann died on October 6, 2020, at the age of 86. He had four stepchildren, seven grandchildren, and nephews at the time of his death.

== Filmography ==
=== Film ===
- Moïse (1990) - Unknown role
- Twin Sisters (1992) - Butler
- Léolo (1992) - Fishmonger
- Canvas (1992) - Jimmy
- Requiem for a Handsome Bastard (1992) - Emission télé
- Mothers and Daughters (1992) - McEwan
- Armen and Bullik (1993) - Charnac
- Sweet Killing (1993) - Officer Lipsky
- Because Why (1993) - Bert
- Divine Fate (1993) - (voice)
- David Copperfield (1993) - Additional voices
- Warriors (1994) - General Moorhead
- Highlander: The Final Dimension (1994) - Stosh
- Dr. Jekyll and Mrs. Hyde (1995) - Lawyer
- Curtis's Charm (1995) - Park Worker
- Murder at 1600 (1997) - Treasury Guard #2
- PSI Factor: Chronicles of the Paranormal (1997) - County Coroner Louis Arnold
- Blind Faith (1998) - Judge Aker
- Tommy and the Wildcat (1998) - Kalle Pokka (English, voice)
- The Third Miracle (1999) - Cardinal Humes
- X-Men (2000) - Emcee
- Century Hotel (2001) - Older Salvatore
- Serendipity (2001) - Janitor
- Protection (2001) - Lujak
- Touch (2002) - Trick #1
- Fancy Dancing (2002) - Zero
- Boys Briefs 2 (2002) - Trick #1
- The Fur Store (2003) - Unknown role
- Name of the Rose (2003) - Professor Wiseman
- The Absence of Emily (2003) - Mr. Brewster
- Adventures in Animation 3D (2004) - Fats, Phil Johnson (voices)
- A Lobster Tale (2006) - Morty Thorpe
- Boys Briefs 4 (2006) - Calvin
- You Kill Me (2007) - Walter Fitzgerald
- The Echo (2008) - Old Man
- Green (2008) - Stanley
- You Might as Well Live (2009) - Rabbi Kirshenblat
- The Way It Used to Be (2009) - Alfred
- The Untitled Work of Paul Shepard (2010) - Dr. Max Henreid
- American Wife (2010) - Elderly Man
- Searching for Wonder (2011) - Professor
- Stag (2013) - Old Man
- 88 (2015) - Dale
- He Never Died (2015) - Announcer

=== Television ===
- Are You Afraid of the Dark? (1992–1994) - Dr. Vink, Zeebo, Carney, other various roles.
- Samurai Pizza Cats (1991) - Additional voices (uncredited)
- Adventures of the Little Mermaid (1991) - Anselm (voice)
- Heritage Minutes (1991) - McFarlane
- Urban Angel (1991) - The Printer
- Urikupen Kyūjotai dub Jungle Tales (1992) - Kong Leo (English, voice)
- Huckleberry Finn (1993) - Pap Finn (English, voice)
- The Maharaja's Daughter (1994) - Police Captain
- Monster Force (1994) - Additional voices
- The Busy World of Richard Scarry (1993–1997) - Additional voices
- Scoop III (1994) - Caissier smoked-meat
- The Real Story of Baa Baa Black Sheep (1994) - Master Wolf (voice)
- The Real Story of Frère Jacques (1994) - Father Abbot (voice)
- The Real Story of Sur le Pont d'Avignon (1994) - King (voice)
- The Real Story of Au Clair de la Lune (1994) - Pierrot (voice)
- Tales of the Wild (1995) - McCready
- Due South (1995–1997) - Tom, Bert Block, Nelson
- Sirens (1995) - Tommy Flint, Gideon Wylie
- TekWar (1995) - Alonzo Del Amo
- The Hardy Boys (1995) - Jimmy
- Where's the Money, Noreen? (1995) - Manager
- Goosebumps (1995) - Dr. Shreek
- Captive Heart: The James Mink Story (1996) - Conductor
- Trilogy of Terror II (1996) - Steve
- Blazing Dragons (1996–1998) - King Allfire (voice)
- Stickin' Around (1996–1998) - Additional voices
- Wind at My Back (1997) - Joe Willis
- Jack Higgins's the Windsor Protocol (1997) - Uncle Misha
- Donkey Kong Country (1997–2000) - Cranky Kong (voice)
- The Adventures of Sam & Max: Freelance Police (1997–1998) - Additional voices
- Peacekeepers (1997) - Mondolo
- Silver Surfer (1998) - Master of Zenn-la (voice)
- The Long Island Incident (1998) - Gun Salesman
- His Bodyguard (1998) - Dr. Frank
- Universal Soldier II: Brothers in Arms (1998) - John Devreaux
- Universal Soldier III: Unfinished Business (1998) - John Devreaux
- Earth: Final Conflict (1998) - Smackovich
- Scandalous Me: The Jacqueline Susan Story (1998) - Producer One
- Blaster's Universe (1999) - Unknown role
- The Devil's Arithmetic (1999) - Uncle Abe
- My Gentleman Friends (1999) - Victor
- Rocky Marciano (1999) - Charley Goldman
- Relic Hunter (1999) - Lawrence Zale
- Mr. Rock 'n' Roll: The Alan Freed Story (1999) - J. Edgar Hoover
- A Holiday Romance (1999) - Joseph
- Common Ground (2000) - Mr. Manos
- George Shrinks (2000) - Kongo
- Santa Who? (2000) - Grandpa (television movie)
- The Zack Files (2000) - Old Man
- Chasing Cain (2000) - Rad
- The Associates (2001) -
- A Nero Wolfe Mystery (2001) - Commissioner Skinner, Mr. Carlisle, Commissioner Bernard Fromm
- Life with Judy Garland: Me and My Shadows (2001) - George Jessel
- Gahan Wilson's the Kid (2001) - Guard, Mr. Camiso (voices)
- Screech Owls (2001) - Grandfather
- Thieves (2001) - Sid
- Keep the Faith, Baby (2002) - Chairman Emanuel Celler
- 10,000 Black Men Named George (2002) - Governor Morrow
- Monk (2002) - Leo Otterman
- The Rats (2002) - Janitor
- The Pact (2002) - Judge H. Rossiter
- Martin and Lewis - Max Coleman
- Second String (2002) - Charley Tuck
- Salem Witch Trials (2002) - Giles Corey
- Blue Murder (2003) - Motel Manager
- Good Fences (2003) - Belcher
- The One - Ace the Baker
- Homeless to Harvard: The Liz Murray Story (2003) - Pops
- Puppets Who Kill (2004) - Deprogrammer
- Wonderfalls (2004) - Gwen
- Lives of the Saints (2004) - Lawyer
- Cool Money (2005) - Judge Raymond Ziff
- Kojak (2005) - Grant Cleveland
- Jane and the Dragon (2001) - Sir Theodore Boarmaster (voice)
- Gold (2005) - Calvin
- The Buck Calder Experience (2006) - Lou Blatts
- At the Hotel (2006) - Norman
- The Shakespeare Comedy Show (2006) - Lear
- Jane and the Dragon (2006) - Sir Theodore Boarmaster (voice)
- Dogasaur (2006) - Alfred lippe'
- Billable Hours (2006–2008) - Mortie Fagen
- Master of Horror (2007) - George Graham
- The Jon Dore Television Show (2009) - Mr. Pansky
- The Dating Guy (2009) - Captain Steiner (voice)
- Lost Girl (2010) - Mayer
- Babar and the Adventures of Badou (2010-2015) - General Huc (voice)
- The Adventures of Chuck and Friends (2011) - Grandpa Treadwell, Salty Saul (voices)
- Cybergeddon (2012) - Arthur Hastings
- Billable Hours (2006–2008) - Mortie Fagen
- The Day My Butt Went Psycho! (2013–2015) - Additional voices
- The Stanley Dynamic (2014–2016) - Walter Floggins
- Hard Rock Medical (2015) - Fred
- Vox (2015) - Fernando Moroso
- Heroes Reborn (2015) - Old Angry Guy
- You Got Trumped: The First 100 Days (2016) - Klaus
- Ransom (2017) - Grandfather

=== Web ===
- My 90-Year-Old Roommate (2018) - Harry

=== Video games ===
- Suikoden Tierkreis (2008) - Macoute
