= Robert Monderie =

Canadian documentary filmmaker (born 1948)

Robert Monderie (born 1948) is a Canadian documentary filmmaker from Rouyn-Noranda, Quebec. He is most noted for several films he co-directed with Richard Desjardins, including Forest Alert (L'Erreur boréale), The Invisible Nation (Le Peuple invisible) and The Hole Story (Trou story).

Both Forest Alert and The Invisible Nation were winners of the Jutra Award for Best Documentary Film.

== Filmography ==
- 1977 - A Raging Disaster (Comme des chiens en pacage), with Richard Desjardins
- 1978 - Firefly (Mouche à feu), with Richard Desjardins
- 1980 - Noranda, with Daniel Corvec
- 1982 - Les Chercheurs d'emplois
- 1983 - Le Métal de Satan
- 1983 - L'Homme photographié
- 1987 - Montréal
- 1993 - On vous met dehors
- 1999 - Forest Alert (L'erreur boréale), with Richard Desjardins
- 2002 - La Loi de l'eau
- 2007 - The Invisible Nation (Le peuple invisible), with Richard Desjardins
- 2011 - The Hole Story (Trou story), with Richard Desjardins
