= You Don't Like the Truth =

You Don't Like the Truth: Four Days Inside Guantanamo
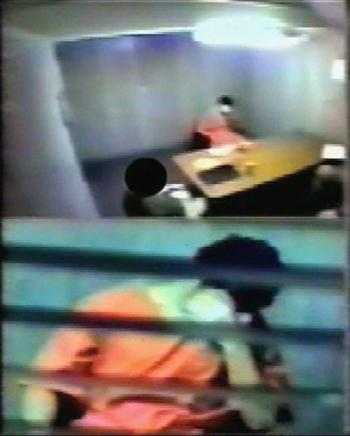
- Surveillance footage, that show how Canadian agents interrogated 15-year-old Omar Khadr
- Directed by: Luc Côté; Patricio Henríquez
- Release date: 2010

You Don't Like The Truth: Four Days Inside Guantanamo is a 2010 documentary. The film focuses on the recorded interrogations of Canadian child soldier Omar Khadr, by Canadian intelligence personnel that took place over four days from February 13–16, 2003 while he was held at Guantanamo. It presents these with observations by his lawyers and former cell mates from the Bagram Theater Internment Facility and Guantanamo Bay detention camps.

The film premiered at the Festival du nouveau cinéma in Montreal in October 2010. The film was shown to Canadian parliamentarians in October 2010. Khadr's defence attorney's planned to show the film during their summation if Khadr's trial went forward. According to the Montreal Gazette the film-makers Luc Côté and Patricio Henríquez also produced a series of short YouTube videos as a companion to the feature-length documentary.

== Summary ==
Omar Khadr was taken captive in Pakistan at the age of 15 and ultimately imprisoned at Guantanamo, charged with killing a US soldier.

Khadr was finally transferred into Canadian custody in late 2012. He was held in a maximum security prison and transferred in 2014 to a medium-security one. He was released in 2015.

== Reception ==
Peter Bradshaw wrote in The Guardian,

His unseen interrogator here is a Canadian intelligence officer, evidently the lead officer in a team, permitted by the Americans to question the prisoner on the understanding that a friendly seeming fellow countryman might cause Khadr to open up and give the US valuable intelligence. So far from being a respite from torture, this insincere friendly chat is a hideous refinement of cruelty: a horrifying turn of the screw.

Andrew O'Hehir wrote in Salon, "Khadr became a sort of ritual sacrifice by the Canadian government, an offering to its American allies and/or overlords."

Sam Kressner wrote in Filmcritic.com:

The question posed in You Don't Like the Truth: 4 Days Inside Guantanamo is not that of Omar's innocence. We will never know what truly happened. Rather, the crux of the film lies in the legal "black-hole" that Guantanamo detainees find themselves in. Is it possible to hold a man, let alone a child, accountable to the status of Prison of War, illegal under United Nations law since the days of the Nuremberg Trials?

== Awards ==
The film won the Special Jury Award at the International Documentary Film Festival Amsterdam.

The film won an award for "best documentary about society" at the Prix Gémeaux on September 13, 2011.

The film was nominated in the best documentary category for the 2010 Genie awards. According to a September 27, 2011 review in the Film Journal, the film did not yet have a distributor in the United States, but was eligible for an Oscar nomination opening in New York City in September 2011. It did not receive a nomination.

== Politics ==
Shortly before the film's premiere, Canada lost its bid for one of the rotating seats on the United Nations Security Council. According to Rhéal Séguin, writing in The Globe and Mail, the filmmakers "are convinced one reason Canada failed to get a seat on the United Nations Security Council was because the federal government has been condemned by many countries for failing to respect Mr. Khadr's human rights and the provisions of the international convention on child soldiers."
