= Diary of a Father =

2023 Canadian documentary film

- French: Journal d'un père
- Directed by: Claude Demers
- Written by: Claude Demers
- Produced by: Claude Demers
- Starring: Claude Demers
- Cinematography: Olivier Tétreault; Claude Demers; François Messier-Rheault
- Edited by: Natalie Lamoureux
- Music by: Sei Nakauchi Pelletier
- Production company: Les Films de l'autre
- Distributed by: Maison 4:3
- Release date: November 20, 2023 (RIDM)
- Running time: 96 minutes
- Country: Canada
- Language: French

Diary of a Father (French: Journal d'un père) is a Canadian documentary film, directed by Claude Demers and released in 2024. The film is a personal essay about fatherhood, reflecting on how his childhood as an adoptee who never knew his biological father has impacted his contemporary experience as father to a daughter he cannot see as often as he might wish because she lives with her mother in another country.

The film premiered at the 2023 Montreal International Documentary Festival, before going into commercial release in 2024.

== Awards ==
| Award | Date of ceremony | Category | Recipient(s) | Result | Ref. |
|---|---|---|---|---|---|
| Canadian Screen Awards | June 1, 2025 | Best Cinematography in a Documentary | Olivier Tétreault, Claude Demers, François Messier-Rheault | Nominated | |
| Canadian Screen Awards | June 1, 2025 | Best Original Music in a Documentary | Sei Nakauchi Pelletier | Nominated | |
| Canadian Screen Awards | June 1, 2025 | Best Sound Design in a Documentary | Patrice LeBlanc, Luc Boudrias | Nominated | |
