= Just Desserts shooting =

1994 Canadian crime

Coordinates: 43°40′28″N 79°24′00″W

The Just Desserts shooting was a notable crime that occurred in Toronto on the evening of Tuesday, April 5, 1994. Just after 11:00 PM, a group of three men barged into the Just Desserts Café, a popular café on Davenport Road in Toronto's Yorkville neighbourhood. One of the men was armed with a shotgun. The armed robbers ordered the thirty staff and patrons to the back of the store and took their valuables.

One of the patrons that evening was 23-year-old hairdresser Georgina Leimonis (a.k.a. Vivi Leimonis) who was there with her boyfriend. A dispute broke out when two male patrons refused to hand over their wallets; they were punched by one of the robbers. Soon after, the man with the shotgun fired and hit Leimonis in the chest. The robbers fled the restaurant. Leimonis was rushed to hospital; after surgery she died at 2:45 on Wednesday morning.

== Investigation ==
A security camera in the restaurant filmed the entire scene, but its low quality and lack of audio made it difficult to make out events and hard to identify the murderers. The police began a search for four men, the three who had been involved in the robbery and another who had helped them case the restaurant earlier. The police were criticized when the descriptions released of the four men was that they were 6-foot-tall black men. Many felt that such a vague description would do nothing to help capture the perpetrators and would merely enhance stereotypes of black men being criminals.

A week after the shooting Lawrence Augustus Brown was identified as a suspect and he turned himself in to police. Another of the three, O'Neil Rohan Grant, was arrested soon after. That fall, Gary George Francis and Emile Mark Jones were arrested. Grant, Francis, and Jones were charged with manslaughter and robbery. Brown, who had fired the shotgun, was charged with first-degree murder. The charges against Jones, who was not involved in the robbery itself, were later dropped.

== Consequences ==
The shooting caused an unprecedented uproar in Toronto and Canada in general. While Canada had 596 murders in 1994, the crime occurred "within minutes of virtually every national media outlet in the country," and the cold-blooded murder of a woman is rare. As a result, more than 3,000 people attended her funeral. The outcry led to a call for many political changes. Some called for a return of capital punishment, others for increased gun control.

When it was discovered that the attackers were Jamaican citizens, though they had arrived in Canada as children, editorials in the Toronto Sun and in other media outlets called for tougher immigration laws. New rules were brought in making it easier to deport non-citizens who committed crimes.

== Trial ==
The already famous crime also became notable for being extensively mishandled. The move to trial was extremely slow, as the men sat in jail for years, being denied bail, but not being brought to trial. The case was marred by errors by police and prosecutors, but it was mainly lengthened by defence lawyers who were later accused of unprofessional conduct. While the new defence team argued the charges should be thrown out due to the long delay, this motion was rejected. By the time it came to trial, 40,000 pages of files related to the case had accumulated.

The trials finally got underway in May 1999, with Brown now acting as his own defence counsel. The trial itself became one of Canada's longest, with Brown extensively cross-examining each witness, often for up to two days.

Allegations of racism and discrimination were levelled from the very beginning. One of the lawyers — there were dozens hired, fired and removed — likened the preferred indictment to "the modern-day equivalent of a lynching." Moreover, in a letter written in 1995 to Ian Scott, then chief counsel for special investigations at the Crown Law Office, lawyers for the accused alleged that "this case has drawn a tremendous amount of publicity . . . not because of the nature of the crime itself, but because the defendants are all black, Ms. Leimonis is white and the incident occurred in an upper-middle-class restaurant frequented primarily by white people."

A scathing 60-page summary ruling on the case by Mr. Justice Brian Trafford, puts the police and the justice system in an unenviable light. The selective use of leg irons, belly chains and handcuffs on the three suspects displayed "cultural insensitivity towards black people," stated Judge Trafford. He also found that to this day Toronto police have "never comprehensively investigated allegations of abuse." Activists, angry at the use of shackles, have brought up the spectre of the slave trade. They have pointed out that Paul Bernardo was never shackled in court.

=== Verdict ===
The case continued to attract widespread public interest. On the day after the trial closed on December 6, 1999, The Globe and Mail published an unprecedented six-page section devoted to the murder and trial. The verdict was finally released on December 11: Brown and Francis were found guilty, and Grant was acquitted. Brown was given a life sentence with no chance of parole for twenty-five years. Francis was given fifteen years, and seven were knocked off for the years in jail during the trial. He was thus eligible for parole only three years later, but his 2002 application was rejected. He was released on parole in 2005. On February 24, 2008, Francis was found in possession of 33 grams of crack cocaine and in May 2008 sentenced to 7½ months in jail for several drug related offences. Grant was deported from Canada to his native Jamaica where he was shot to death on October 29, 2007.

== Current tenants ==
The infamous location at 306 Davenport Road was occupied by a Subway Restaurant franchise and is currently empty, with a proposal by Cityzen Development Group to build a condominium. Developers demolished the building in Spring 2022.

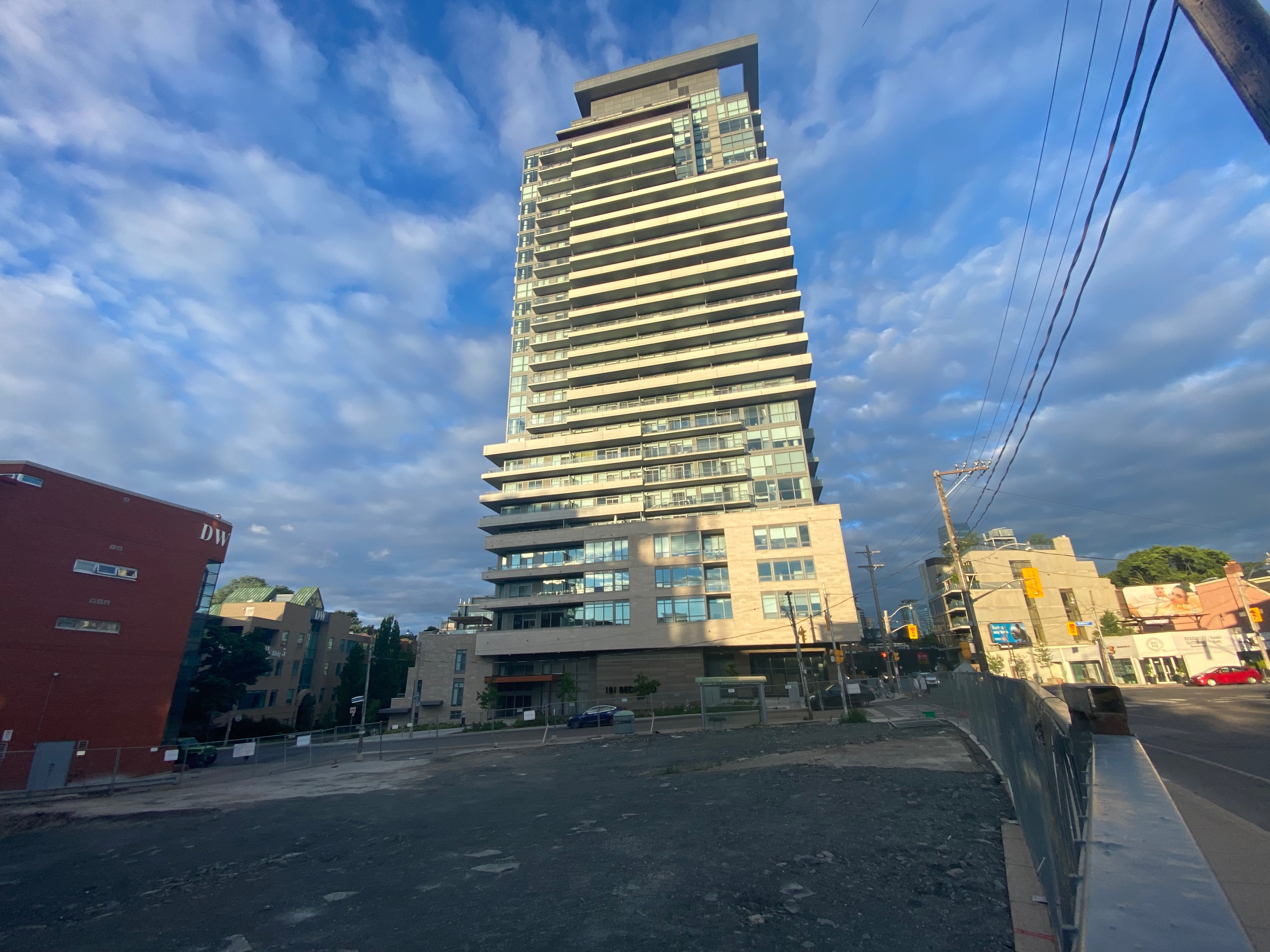
Former Just Desserts Building site as seen on 27 June 2022.

== Cultural impact ==
The shooting inspired both Jerry Ciccoritti's 1999 film The Life Before This, and the pilot episode of the Canadian television drama series The City.
