= The Life Before This =

- Directed by: Jerry Ciccoritti
- Written by: Semi Chellas
- Produced by: Ilana Frank
- Starring: Catherine O'Hara; Joe Pantoliano; Sarah Polley; Stephen Rea
- Cinematography: Norayr Kasper
- Edited by: Nick Rotundo; George Roulston
- Music by: Ron Sures
- Distributed by: Alliance Atlantis
- Release date: September 15, 1999 (TIFF)
- Running time: 92 minutes
- Country: Canada
- Language: English

The Life Before This is a 1999 Canadian drama film directed by Jerry Ciccoritti. It begins with a massacre perpetrated in a coffee shop by two gunmen, and then uses flashbacks to show how each of the people present found themselves in the shop on that day.

The film was inspired by the Just Desserts shooting of 1994.

The film premiered at the 1999 Toronto International Film Festival.

== Cast ==
- Catherine O'Hara as Sheena
- Joe Pantoliano as Jake MacLean
- Sarah Polley as Connie
- Stephen Rea as Brian
- Bernard Behrens as Monsieur Farrin
- Martha Burns as Gwen MacLean
- Fab Filippo as Michael
- Emily Hampshire as Margaret
- David Hewlett as Nick
- Leslie Hope as Alice
- Joel Keller as Kevin
- Dan Lett as Sam
- Jennifer Dale as Laura Lorrie

== Response ==
The film received mixed reviews from critics. Peter Howell of the Toronto Star wrote that the film had a solid cast, but that "in seeking to make an Altmanesque story about the perfidy of fate surrounding the events leading to a cafe massacre, the movie follows dull characters too far and interesting ones not far enough."

Deirdre Dolan of the National Post wrote that the initial shooting scene was stiffly acted and meaningfully paced, leading her to fear that she was about to watch "another self-important, amateur film", but opined that the film became more engaging once it shifted to explore the various decisions and choices that had led everybody to the café: "That we know their fates from the beginning only adds a layer of tension and meaning, an effect reminiscent of Robert Altman and good television." Conversely, Marc Horton of the Edmonton Journal wrote that beginning the film with the shooting scene robbed it of any suspense.

Catherine O'Hara won the Genie Award for Best Supporting Actress at the 20th Genie Awards.
