= Waseskun =

- Directed by: Steve Patry
- Written by: Steve Patry
- Produced by: Nathalie Cloutier; Denis McCready
- Edited by: Natalie Lamoureux
- Release date: 2016
- Running time: 1h 20m
- Country: Canada
- Language: English

Waseskun is a 2016 documentary film written and directed by Steve Patry about the Waseskun Healing Centre, a Correctional Service of Canada healing lodge run by Canadian Indigenous people for Indigenous inmates, situated in Quebec's Lanaudière region.

The title of the film and the facility, waseskun, is a Cree word describing the moment when clouds part after a storm and sunshine breaks through. The director lived with inmates three to four days a week over the course of an entire year, to record their experiences as well as build trust. The film shows how the facility combines traditional healing practices with crafts, sport as well as personal confessions. Inmates are shown recounting experiences of childhood abuse, and working to break the cycle of abuse and addiction.

The film was produced by the National Film Board of Canada. It received two Canadian Screen Award nominations, for Best Feature Length Documentary and Best Editing in a Documentary, at the 5th Canadian Screen Awards.
