= What Are We Doing Here? (film) =

- Film poster
- French: Qu’est-ce qu’on fait ici ?
- Directed by: Julie Hivon
- Written by: Julie Hivon
- Produced by: François Delisle; Maxime Bernard
- Starring: Charles-Alexandre Dubé; Joëlle Paré Beaulieu; Sophie Desmarais
- Cinematography: Claudine Sauvé
- Edited by: Natalie Lamoureux
- Production company: Films 53/12
- Distributed by: K Films Amérique
- Release date: September 15, 2014 (Cinéfest)
- Running time: 98 minutes
- Country: Canada
- Language: French

What Are We Doing Here? (French: Qu’est-ce qu’on fait ici ?) is a Canadian drama film, directed by Julie Hivon and released in 2014. The film centres on a group of friends in their 20s whose lives are shattered when one of them, Yan (Frédéric Millaire-Zouvi), dies in a car accident.

The film stars Charles-Alexandre Dubé as Simon, Joëlle Paré Beaulieu as Roxanne, Maxime Dumontier as Max, Sophie Desmarais as Lily, Marie-Soleil Dion as Rosalie, and Guylaine Tremblay as Roxanne's mother Nicole.

The film was shot in 2013, primarily in Saint-Amable and Granby, Quebec.

Paré-Beaulieu received a Jutra Award nomination for Best Actress at the 17th Jutra Awards.
