= Forest Alert =

1999 Canadian film directed by Richard Desjardins and Robert Monderie

- French: L'Erreur boréale
- Directed by: Richard Desjardins; Robert Monderie
- Written by: Richard Desjardins
- Produced by: Éric Michel; Bernadette Payeur
- Cinematography: Jacques Leduc
- Edited by: Alain Belhumeur
- Music by: Benoît Groulx; Jean-François Groulx
- Production companies: National Film Board of Canada; ACPAV
- Release date: 1999
- Running time: 68 minutes
- Country: Canada
- Language: French

Forest Alert (French: L'Erreur boréale) is a Canadian documentary film directed by Richard Desjardins and Robert Monderie, released in 1999. The film is a portrait of the forestry industry in Quebec, centred on its reliance on the environmentally unfriendly practice of clearcutting.

The film's original French title, which literally means "Northern Error" and refers to the boreal forest, is also a pun on l'aurore boréale, the French name for the aurora borealis.

The film won the Jutra Award for Best Documentary Film at the 1st Jutra Awards.
