= Richard Desjardins =

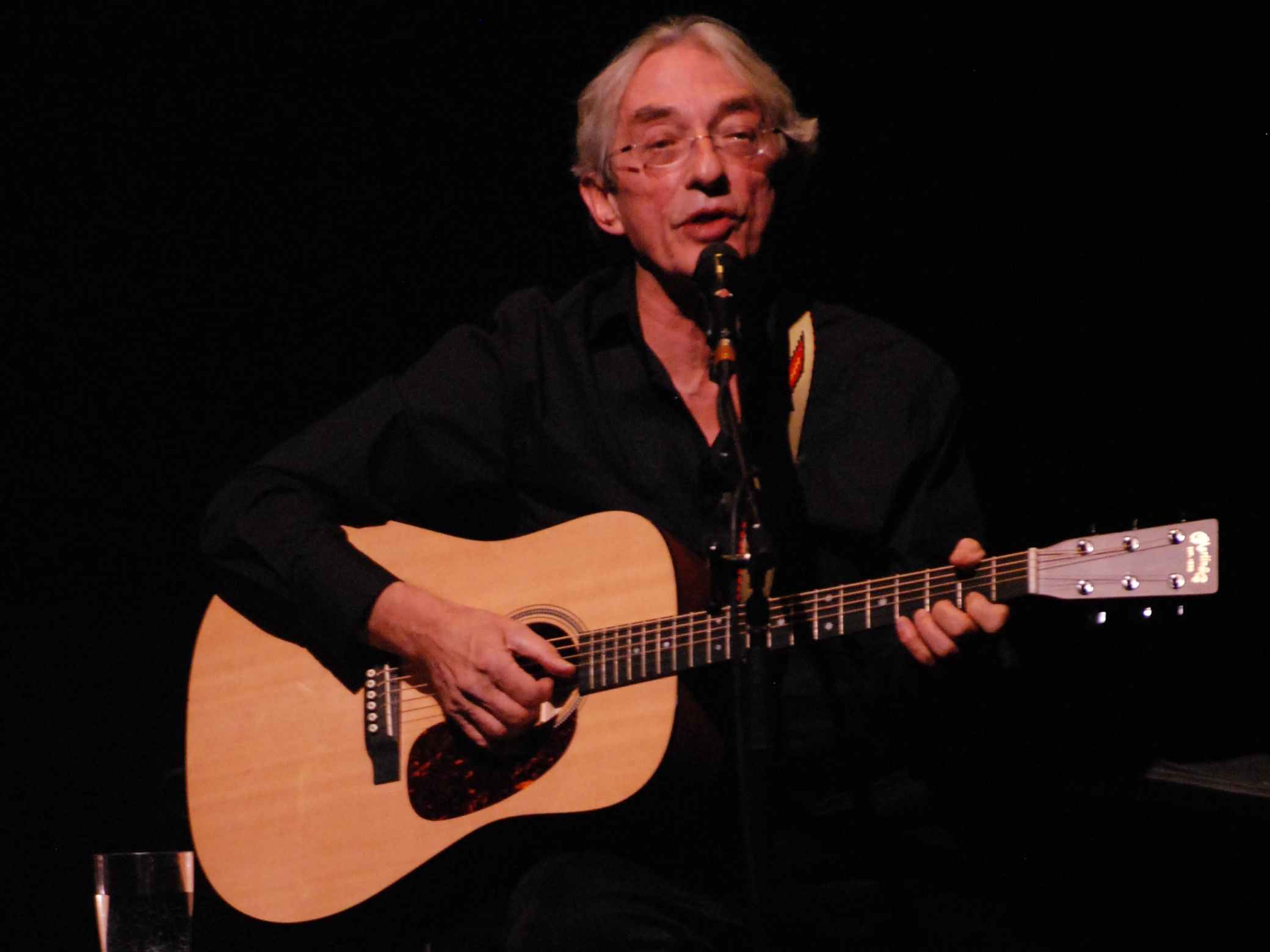

Background information
- Born: March 16, 1948 (age 78); Rouyn, Quebec
- Genres: Folk
- Occupations: Singer, film director
- Years active: 1981–present
- Website: www.richarddesjardins.qc.ca

Richard Desjardins (born March 16, 1948) is a Québécois folk singer and film director.

== Career ==
Desjardins and his friends formed the country rock ensemble Abbitibbi in the 1970s; Desjardins played piano, guitar, and sang. When the group disbanded in 1982, Desjardins pursued a solo career. He released a number of solo albums, including Tu m'aimes-tu in 1990 and Boom Boom, which appeared on the RPM 100 Top Albums list in 1998.

Desjardins also found work scoring films, especially documentaries. This involvement in the Quebec film industry even led him to co-direct a number of feature-length documentaries. He was known for his environmental activism, especially with regards to protecting forests from over-exploitation, and to promote this he and Robert Monderie created the documentary film Forest Alert (L'erreur boréale) in 1999. In 2007 Desjardins, again with Monderie, created The Invisible Nation (Le Peuple invisible), a documentary about the Algonquin nation in Quebec.

Desjardins went on tour in 2013, promoting his album L'existoire; after that he made occasional live appearances, including the 2018 Festival guitares du monde in Abitibi.

In 2017 a group of singers came together at Steve Jolin's Rouyn-Noranda record company to record Chanter Richard Desjardins, a tribute album of Desjardins' songs.

He was profiled in Lisette Marcotte's 2019 documentary film The Last Nataq (Le dernier Nataq).

== Discography ==
Albums

- 1981-Boom Town Café (with Abbittibbi)
- 1988-Les derniers humains
- 1989-Le trésor de la langue (with René Lussier)
- 1990-Tu m'aimes-tu
- 1992-Les derniers humains (new recording)
- 1994-Chaude était la nuit (with Abbittibbi)
- 1998-Boom Boom
- 2003-Kanasuta
- 2011-L'existoire

Live albums

- 1993-Richard Desjardins au Club Soda
- 1996-Desjardins Abbittibbi Live (with Abbittibbi)

Soundtrack

- 1990-Le Party

DVD

- Kanasuta - Là où les diables vont danser (2005)

== Filmography ==
- 1977 - A Raging Disaster (Comme des chiens en pacage) by Desjardins and Robert Monderie
- 1978 - Firefly (Mouche à feu), by Desjardins and Robert Monderie
- 1999 - Forest Alert (L'erreur boréale) by Desjardins and Robert Monderie
- 2007 - The Invisible Nation (Le peuple invisible) by Desjardins and Robert Monderie
- 2011 - The Hole Story (Trou story) by Desjardins and Robert Monderie

== Music for films and theater ==
- À double tour (English title: Twice Convicted), by Marie Cadieux, 1994
- The Party (Le Party) by Pierre Falardeau, 1990
- La Nuit avec Hortense (The night with Hortense), by Jean Chabot, 1988
- Noranda, by Robert Monderie and Daniel Corvec, 1984
- Le doux partage (Soft Sharing) by Sylvie van Brabant, 1983
- Depuis que le monde est monde (Since the world is world) by Sylvie van Brabant, 1981
- Blue Winter (L'hiver bleu) by André Blanchard, 1978
- Beat by André Blanchard, 1976 (Desjardins and Abbittibbi as well as other musicians)
- Composed music for and was musical director of ”Têtes rondes et têtes pointues“ ("The Roundheads and the Peakheads") by Bertold Brecht, at the 1986 Brecht International Festival in Toronto.
- Malartic, 2024

== Bibliography ==
- Carole Couture, "la parole est mine d’or", Éditions Tryptique, Montréal, 1999.
