= Michel Louvain =

Canadian singer (1937–2021)

Michel Louvain CM
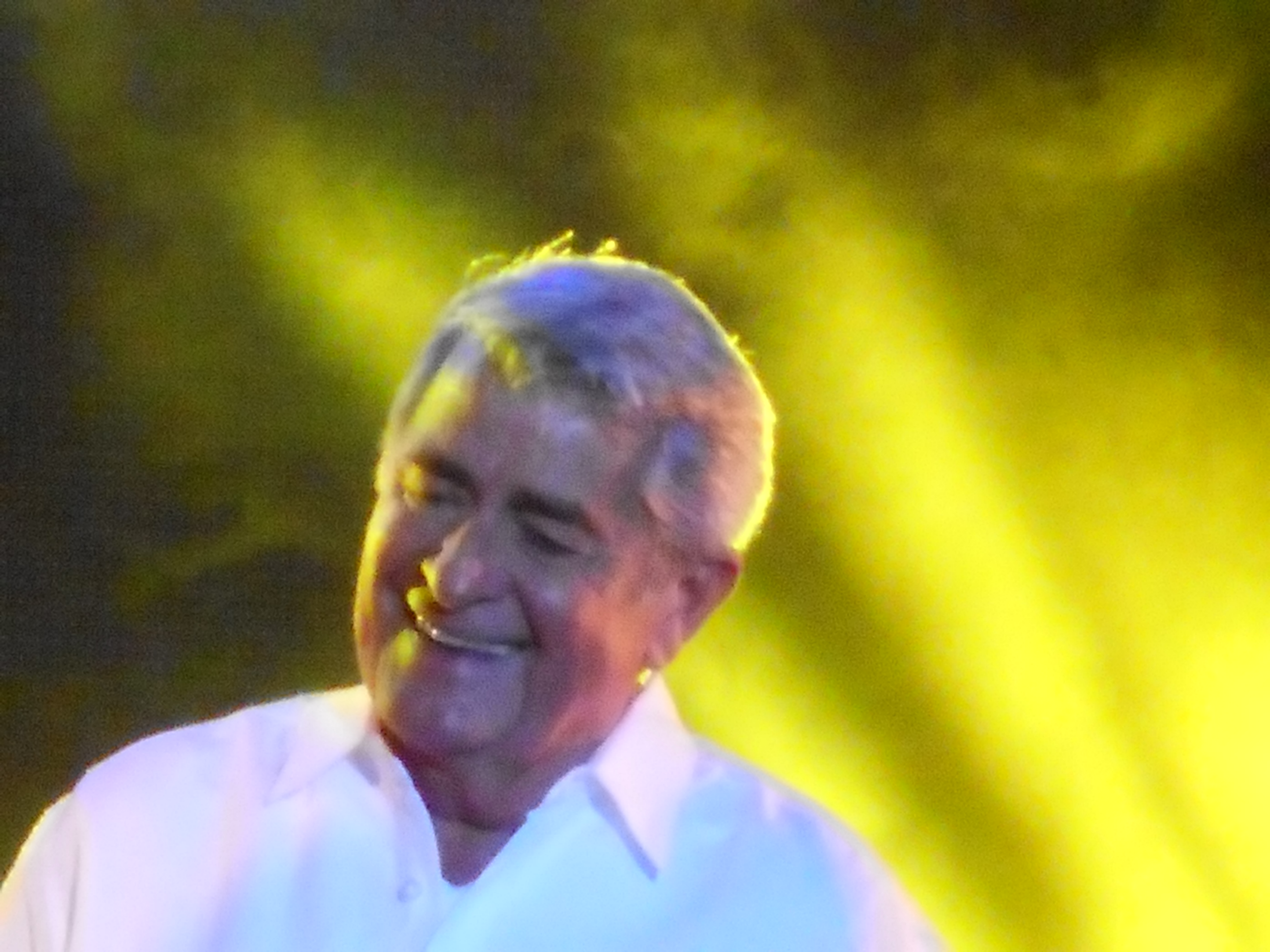
- Louvain in 2015

Background information
- Born: Michel Poulin; July 12, 1937; Thetford Mines, Quebec, Canada
- Origin: Canadian
- Died: April 14, 2021 (aged 83) Montreal, Quebec, Canada
- Occupations: Singer, television presenter
- Years active: 1956–2021
- Website: michel-louvain.com

Michel Louvain, CM (July 12, 1937 – April 14, 2021) was a Canadian singer most popular in the 1960s and 1970s. He recorded many hit songs, and also worked as a host for a variety of shows on television and radio. In 1965 he was voted 'Mr. Radio–TV', Radio Canada's top show business personality, at the Gala des Artistes.

== Early life ==
Louvain was born Michel Poulin in Thetford Mines, Quebec, on July 12, 1937. His father worked as a miner. Louvain first sang as a child in the choir at his local church. He was employed as a hardware store decorator during his adolescence. He consequently moved out of his hometown to pursue a full-time career in singing. He first relocated to Sherbrooke, before settling down in Montreal.

== Career ==
Louvain began working as a master of ceremonies at a hotel in Laval when he was 20 years old. He was later signed to Apex Records in the 1960s. His first hit was "Buenas Noches Mi Amor". Over the next 20 years, Louvain made many recordings, including the hit songs "La Dame en bleu" and "Je déclare l'amour au monde entier". His recordings in French were sold internationally in Belgium. His song "C'est Un Secret" reached #14 in the Canadian RPM Magazine Top 40, November 29, 1965.

Louvain was the host of a succession of CFTM-TV (Montreal) and Radio-Canada TV variety shows. His performances attracted mostly young female fans. He first performed in nightclubs, and, when his following grew more mature, in entertainment theatres. In the 1980s, he staged grandiose music-hall shows, with female dancers and scenery, at the Place des Arts and across Quebec, including Autour du monde in 1984.

Louvain was the subject of a documentary film by Claude Demers, entitled Ladies in Blue (Les dames en bleu).

== Later life ==
Louvain was appointed Knight of the National Order of Quebec in 2010. Five years later, he was named a Member of the Order of Canada. In 2017, as a celebration of his 80th birthday, Louvain set out on a concert tour. One of the concerts was at the Festival d'Été de Québec in Quebec City. He released his 32nd album, La belle vie, in 2019. He was scheduled to tour throughout Quebec from September 2021, beginning in his hometown Thetford Mines.

Louvain died in his sleep on the night of April 14, 2021, at the Hôpital de Verdun in Montreal. He was 83, and suffered from esophageal cancer, which he had been diagnosed with earlier that month. Condolences included the Premier of Quebec François Legault, saying "the people of Quebec have lost an idol", and Canadian Prime Minister Justin Trudeau who described Louvain as "one of Quebec's greatest singers".

Louvain was gay, but rarely spoke about his private life on the record to the media. He was in a 25-year relationship with Mario Théberge, although the couple did not officially marry until just a few days before Louvain's death in 2021.

== Discography ==
- 1958: Michel Louvain
- 1959: Ici Michel Louvain
- 1961: Après minuit
- 1962: Michel Louvain chante ses succès
- 1962: Toi et moi
- 1964: Michel
- 1965: Aloha
- 1965: Cœur à chœur
- 1966: Un peu plus de chanson
- 1967: Formi... formidable
- 1968: Souvenirs exotiques
- 1969: Michel Louvain chante Marie
- 1973: Ma vie, c'est l'amour
- 1974: La Grande kermesse western
- 1974: La Dame en bleu
- 1978: En spectacle au Grand Théâtre de Québec
- 1979: En harmonie
- 1979: Message d'amour et de paix
- 1980: Michel Louvain 1980
- 1982: Michel Louvain: 1957–1982
- 1984: Michel Louvain
- 1986: Il faut s'aimer
- 1988: Noël avec vous
- 1988: L'Amour sera toujours l'amour
- 1989: Romantique
- 1993: Je déclare l'amour
- 1997: La collection Michel Louvain – Les grands succès
- 2002: Les Grands Succès
- 2007: Chante Noël
- 2015: Gentleman Crooner
