= Steve Patry =

Canadian documentary filmmaker

Steve Patry is a Canadian documentary filmmaker from Quebec.

He has been a two-time Jutra/Iris nominee for Best Documentary Film, receiving nods at the 17th Jutra Awards in 2015 for From Prisons to Prisons (De prisons en prisons) and at the 23rd Quebec Cinema Awards in 2021 for I Might Be Dead by Tomorrow (Tant que j'ai du respir dans le corps), and a Canadian Screen Award nominee for Best Feature Length Documentary, receiving a nomination at the 5th Canadian Screen Awards in 2017 for Waseskun.

== Filmography ==
- From Prisons to Prisons (De prisons en prisons) - 2014
- Waseskun - 2016
- I Might Be Dead by Tomorrow (Tant que j'ai du respir dans le corps) - 2020
- These Wild Cats (Des chats sauvages) - 2024
