= Patricio Henríquez =

Patricio Henriquez
- Occupation: filmmaker

Patricio Henriquez is a Quebec based filmmaker, who is a partner with Robert Cornellier and Raymonde Provencher in the Macumba Films documentary studio.

Henriquez grew up and trained in filmmaking in Chile, leaving the country after Augusto Pinochet overthrew the democratically elected government of Salvador Allende.

In 1999, The Last Stand of Salvador Allende won the award for Best History Documentary at the 1999 Hot Docs Canadian International Documentary Festival. In 2000, he won the award for Best Political Documentary for Images of a Dictatorship, which was also the winner of the 2000 M. Joan Chalmers Documentarian Award for Film and Video.

You Don't Like the Truth, a film he co-directed with frequent collaborator Luc Côté, won the award for Best Documentary About Society at the Gémeaux Awards in 2011.

Henriquez's film Uyghurs: Prisoners of the Absurd had its world premiere on October 10, 2014, at the Festival du nouveau cinema. The film, about the 22 Uyghur captives in Guantanamo, is his third related to controversial US policies on holding civilians, for years, in extrajudicial detention. Rushan Abbas, a refugee herself, who had become a US citizen and successful in business, and had agreed to go to Guantanamo to serve as a translator, was one of the experts interviewed in the film told the Montreal Gazette why she agreed to be in Henriquez's film when she had declined other invitations.

“When I met Patricio, I saw that not only is he very passionate and a great director, but when I heard about his background, where he came from, I just had an immediate connection with him. He was a refugee himself. He came from another country because he was looking for a better life … a safe life actually. Why am I in America? Why were these people out of China? It just clicked right away. So I wanted to support this all the way.”

He is a three-time winner of the Jutra/Iris Award for Best Documentary Film, winning at the 2nd Jutra Awards in 2000 for Images of a Dictatorship, the 11th Jutra Awards in 2009 for Under the Hood: A Voyage Into the World of Torture, and the 18th Quebec Cinema Awards in 2016 for Uyghurs: Prisoners of the Absurd.

== Filmography ==
- CSN: Cinq temps d'un mouvement - 1996
- The Last Stand of Salvador Allende (11 de septiembre de 1973. El último combate de Salvador Allende) - 1998
- Images of a Dictatorship (Imageries de una dictatur) - 1999
- Juchitan, Queer Paradise (Juchitán de las locas) - 2002
- Desobediencia - 2005
- The Dark Side of the White Lady (El lado obscuro de la dama blanca) - 2006
- Under the Hood: A Voyage Into the World of Torture - 2008
- You Don't Like the Truth - 2011
- Uyghurs: Prisoners of the Absurd (Ouïghours, prisonniers de l'absurde) - 2014
- Waiting for Raif (En attendant Raif) - 2022
