= Raymonde Provencher =

Canadian documentary filmmaker

Raymonde Provencher is a Canadian documentary filmmaker, most noted for her films War Babies (War Babies, nés de la haine) and Grace, Milly, Lucy...Child Soldiers (Grace, Milly, Lucy ... Des fillettes soldates).

Formerly a television journalist associated most prominently with Télé-Québec's documentary series Nord-Sud, she cofounded the Macumba Films documentary studio with Robert Cornellier and Patricio Henríquez in 1995. In addition to her own work as a director, she is often credited as a producer on films directed by Cornellier or Henríquez.

War Babies was the winner of the Hot Docs Audience Award at the 2003 Hot Docs Canadian International Documentary Festival, and won four Gémeaux Awards in 2003.

A retrospective program of Provencher's films War Babies, Grace, Milly, Lucy, Crimes Without Honour and Café Désirs was scheduled to take place at Hot Docs in 2020. When the event was cancelled due to the COVID-19 pandemic, the retrospective was postponed instead of taking place as part of the online program, and instead was staged at the 2022 festival.

== Filmography ==
- L'Enfance assassinée - 2000
- La Planète ravagée - 2001
- War Babies (War Babies, nés de la haine) - 2002
- Partir ou mourir - 2005
- Une nouvelle vie pour Ramon Mercedes - 2007
- Le déshonneur des Casques bleus - 2007
- Une mort insensée - 2008
- Grace, Milly, Lucy...Child Soldiers (Grace, Milly, Lucy ... Des fillettes soldates) - 2009
- Crimes Without Honour (Ces crimes sans honneur ) - 2012
- Café Désirs - 2015
- Déchirements - 2017
