= Danic Champoux =

Canadian filmmaker (1976–2022)

Danic Champoux (1976 – February 18, 2022) was a Canadian documentary filmmaker. He was most noted for his 2014 film Self(less) Portrait (Autoportrait sans moi), which was a Jutra Award nominee for Best Documentary Film at the 17th Jutra Awards in 2015.

A native of Sorel-Tracy, Quebec, he participated in the filmmaking series La Course destination monde in 1996, before releasing his first short theatrical documentary film, My Father (Mon père), in 2000. The film was the winner of the Prix Pierre et Yolande Perrault at the 2001 Rendez-vous Québec Cinéma.

He released numerous short and feature documentaries for both film and television throughout his career, with the Gémeaux Award-nominated CHSLD mon amour (2020) being his final film before his death.

== Filmography ==
- My Father (Mon père) - 2000
- Big Gazelle - 2004
- Caporal Mark - 2006
- Cardinal Cowboy - 2007
- La couleur du temps - 2008
- Baklava Blues - 2009
- Mom and Me (Mom et moi) - 2011
- Sessions (Séances) - 2012
- Self(less) Portrait (Autoportrait sans moi) - 2014
- Ça fait 20 ans - 2015
- A Centre-Sud Tale (Conte du Centre-Sud) - 2016
- Cris sur le bayou - 2016
- Arbitres - 2017
- Mon amour, ma prison - 2018
- Mal élevés - 2018
- Daughter of the Crater (La fille du cratère) - 2019
- CHSLD mon amour - 2020
