= My Gentleman Friends =

- Written by: Moze Mossanen
- Directed by: Moze Mossanen
- Starring: Aron Tager; David Gardner; François Klanfer; Christina Collins
- Country of origin: Canada
- Original language: English

Production
- Producers: Moze Mossanen; Anna Newallo
- Cinematography: John Marsonet
- Editors: John Marsonet; Moze Mossanen
- Running time: 75 minutes

Original release
- Network: Bravo
- Release: April 7, 1999

My Gentleman Friends is a Canadian docudrama television film, directed by Moze Mossanen and released in 1999. The film centres on Victor (Aron Tager), Gordon (David Gardner) and Luigi (François Klanfer), three older gay men who were all once dancers with a ballet company, and are being interviewed about their lives by documentary filmmaker Margaret (Christina Collins).

The cast also includes David Dunbar, Greg Spottiswood and Brigitte Gall as production staff assisting Margaret.

Although the main trio of actors was not literally playing themselves, many of their characters' reminiscences in the film were true stories gathered by Mossanen from interviews with real older gay men who had worked in performing arts as actors, musicians, or dancers.

The film premiered on Bravo on April 7, 1999. Mossanen received a Gemini Award nomination for Best Writing in a Dramatic Program or Mini-Series at the 14th Gemini Awards.

The film was subsequently rebroadcast on Bravo in 2004 as part of a retrospective series of Mossanen's works, alongside The Rings of Saturn, The Year of the Lion and his new From Time to Time.
