= TEKE::TEKE =

Canadian psychedelic rock band

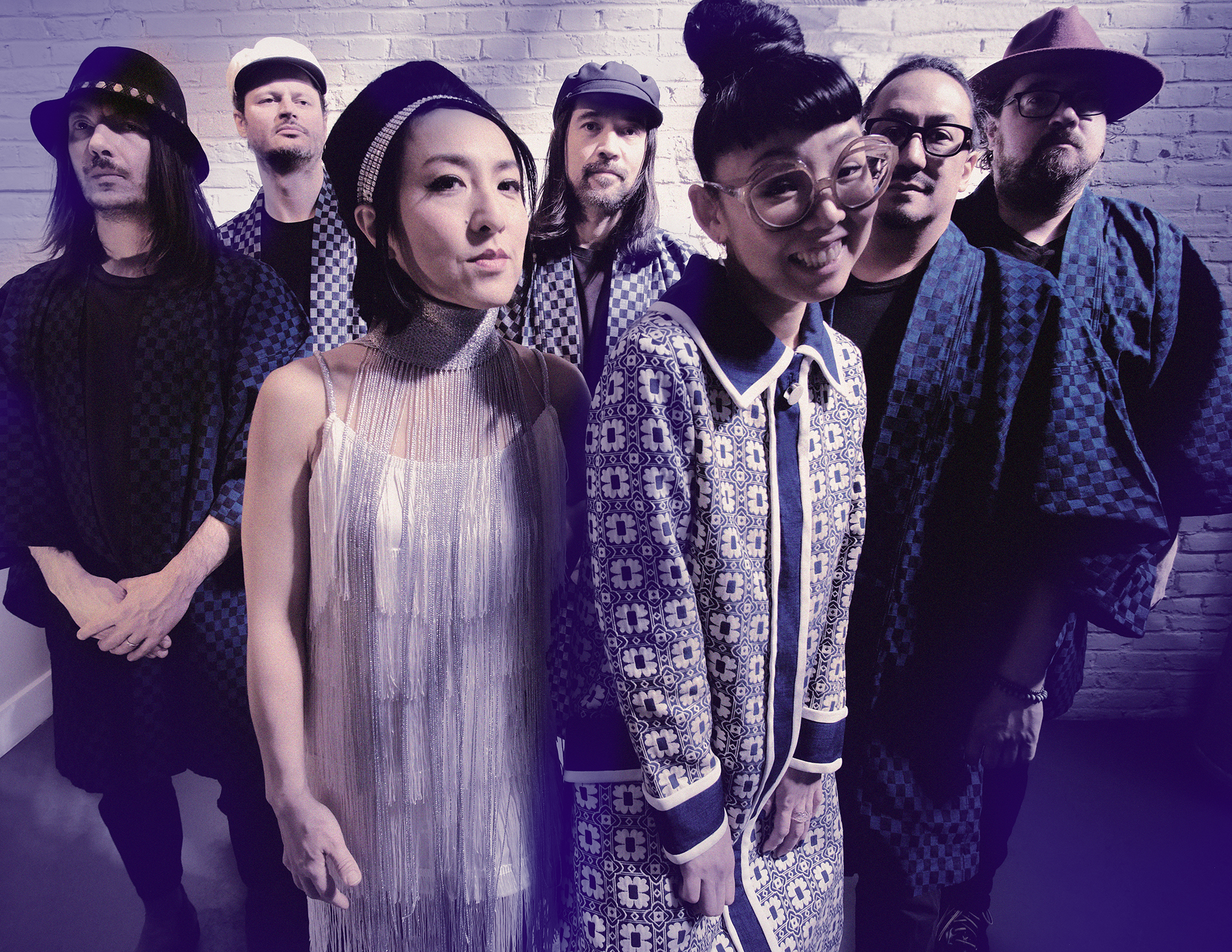

Background information
- Born: Montreal, Quebec, Canada
- Genres: Eleki, experimental rock, psychedelic rock, enka, noise, punk, art-rock, avant-garde, hip hop, film soundtracks, Bulgarian music, Brazilian music,
- Instruments: Guitars, bass, drums, trombone, flute, shinobue, keyboard, gaïda, vocals, percussion
- Years active: 2017–present
- Labels: Kill Rock Stars; SUB POP
- Members: Sei Nakauchi Pelletier; Hidetaka Yoneyama; Mishka Stein; Yuki Isami; Etienne Lebel; Ian Lettre; Maya Kuroki
- Website: https://www.teketekeband.com

TEKE::TEKE is a Japanese-Canadian psychedelic rock band, whose music blends Japanese rock and surf rock influences. Their album Shirushi, was a longlisted nominee for the 2021 Polaris Music Prize, as was their follow up, 2023's Hagata.

The band was formed by guitarist Serge (Sei) Nakauchi Pelletier, trombonist Étienne Lebel and drummer Ian Lettre, originally as a Takeshi Terauchi tribute band, after they discovered Terauchi's music while on tour with rapper Boogat. They added guitarist Hidetaka Yoneyama, bassist Mishka Stein and flautist Yuki Isami and made their live debut in a 2017 show at the Distorsion Festival in Montreal; by the time of the band's second show at the Pop Montreal festival, they had added vocalist Maya Kuroki and evolved from a straight Terauchi cover band to performing original material inspired by Japanese eleki music.

Their debut EP Jikaku was released in 2018, and Shirushi, their full-length debut album, was released in May 2021 on Kill Rock Stars.

They followed up in 2023 with Hagata, which was longlisted for the 2024 Polaris Music Prize.

In 2024 it was announced they were commissioned to create an original album soundtrack for Ubisoft's Assassin's Creed: Shadows. Sei Nakauchi Pelletier has also had credits as a film composer, and received a Canadian Screen Award nomination for Best Original Music in a Documentary at the 13th Canadian Screen Awards in 2025 for his work on Diary of a Father (Journal d'un père).
