= 28th Genie Awards =

2008 Canadian film awards ceremony

- Date: March 3, 2008
- Site: Metro Toronto Convention Centre, Toronto, Ontario
- Hosted by: Sandra Oh

Highlights
- Best Picture: Away from Her
- Most awards: Away from Her, Eastern Promises
- Most nominations: Eastern Promises, Shake Hands with the Devil

Television coverage
- Network: E!

The 28th Genie Awards were held on March 3, 2008 to honour films released in 2007. The ceremony was held at the Metro Toronto Convention Centre in Toronto, Ontario, Canada. The show was broadcast on E! and Independent Film Channel and hosted by Sandra Oh.

== Controversy ==
The nominations for 2008 faced some controversy when director Jason Reitman issued a statement expressing his disappointment that the hit film Juno, which had a Canadian director, Canadian stars (Elliot Page (Note: Credited as Ellen Page) and Michael Cera) and a Canadian crew, and was filmed in Canada, did not qualify for a nomination. Sara Morton, the head of the Academy of Canadian Cinema and Television, issued a statement indicating that the film — which was produced by an American film studio — had not been submitted for Genie Award consideration.

== Top nominations ==
- Eastern Promises and Shake Hands with the Devil - 12
- Away from Her - 7
- The Tracey Fragments - 6
- Continental, A Film without Guns and Silk - 5
- Days of Darkness - 4

== Nominees ==
Motion Picture	Direction
Away From Her — Daniel Iron, Simone Urdl and Jennifer Weiss; Days of Darkness (L'Âge des ténèbres) — Denise Robert, Daniel Louis; Continental, a Film Without Guns (Continental, un film sans fusil) — Luc Déry, Kim McCraw; Eastern Promises — Robert Lantos, Paul Webster; Shake Hands With the Devil — Laszlo Barna, Michael Donovan	Sarah Polley, Away From Her; David Cronenberg, Eastern Promises; Denys Arcand, Days of Darkness (L'Âge des ténèbres); Roger Spottiswoode, Shake Hands With the Devil; Bruce McDonald, The Tracey Fragments
Actor in a leading role	Actress in a leading role
Gordon Pinsent, Away From Her; Viggo Mortensen, Eastern Promises; Marc Labrèche, Days of Darkness (L'Âge des ténèbres); Claude Legault, The 3 L'il Pigs (Les 3 p'tits cochons); Roy Dupuis, Shake Hands With the Devil	Julie Christie, Away From Her; Anne-Marie Cadieux, You (Toi); Elliot Page, The Tracey Fragments; Molly Parker, Who Loves the Sun; Béatrice Picard, My Aunt Aline (Ma tante Aline)
Actor in a supporting role	Actress in a supporting role
Armin Mueller-Stahl, Eastern Promises; Gilbert Sicotte, Continental, a Film Without Guns (Continental, un film sans fusil); Guillaume Lemay-Thivierge, The 3 L'il Pigs (Les 3 p'tits cochons); Danny Glover, Poor Boy's Game; Michel-Ange Nzojibwami, Shake Hands With the Devil	Kristen Thomson, Away From Her; Fanny Mallette, Continental, a Film Without Guns (Continental, un film sans fusil); Marie-Ginette Guay, Continental, a Film Without Guns (Continental, un film sans fusil); Laurence Leboeuf, My Daughter, My Angel (Ma fille mon ange); Véronique Le Flaguais, Surviving My Mother
Original Screenplay	Adapted Screenplay
Steve Knight, Eastern Promises; Marc-André Lavoie, Simon Olivier Fecteau, David Gauthier, Bluff; Douglas Coupland, Everything's Gone Green; Denys Arcand, Days of Darkness (L'Âge des ténèbres); Pierre Lamothe, Claude Lalonde, The 3 L'il Pigs (Les 3 p'tits cochons)	Sarah Polley, Away From Her; Michael Donovan, Shake Hands With the Devil; Maureen Medved, The Tracey Fragments
Best Live Action Short Drama	Best Animated Short
Alexis Fortier Gauthier and Élaine Hébert, After All (Après tout); Marc Almon and Nona MacDermid, The Wake of Calum MacLeod (Faire Chaluim Mhic Leòid); Michelle Porter and Amy Belling, Regarding Sarah; Anthony Green and Philip Svoboda, Screening; Jeffrey St. Jules and Larissa Giroux, The Tragic Story of Nling	Madame Tutli-Putli — Maciek Szczerbowski, Chris Lavis, Marcy Page; Here and There (Ici par ici) — Marc Bertrand, Diane Obomsawin; Jeu — Marcel Jean, Michèle Bélanger, Georges Schwizgebel
Art Direction/Production Design	Cinematography
Rob Gray, James Willcock, Fido; André-Line Beauparlant, Continental, a Film Without Guns (Continental, un film sans fusil); Carol Spier, Eastern Promises; Lindsey Hermer-Bell, Justin Craig, Shake Hands With the Devil; François Séguin, Silk	Peter Suschitzky, Eastern Promises; Bruce Chun, Nitro; Vic Sarin, Partition; Miroslaw Baszak, Shake Hands With the Devil; Alain Dostie, Silk
Costume Design	Editing
Carlo Poggioli, Kazuko Kurosawa, Silk; Denise Cronenberg, Eastern Promises; Mary E. McLeod, Fido; Dolly Ahluwalia, Partition; Joyce Schure, Shake Hands With the Devil	Ronald Sanders, Eastern Promises; David Wharnsby, Away From Her; Jean-François Bergeron, The 3 L'il Pigs (Les 3 p'tits cochons); Susan Maggi, Poor Boy's Game; Jeremiah Munce, Gareth C. Scales, The Tracey Fragments
Overall Sound	Sound Editing
Stuart Wilson, Christian Cooke, Orest Sushko, Mark Zsifkovits, Eastern Promises; John J. Thomson, Stephan Carrier, Martin Lee, Citizen Duane; Eric Fitz, Jo Caron, Gavin Fernandes, Benoît Leduc, Shake Hands With the Devil; Claude La Haye, Olivier Calvert, Bernard Gariépy Strobl, Hans Peter Strobl, Silk; John Hazen, Matt Chan, Brad Dawe, The Tracey Fragments	Wayne Griffin, Rob Bertola, Tony Currie, Goro Koyama and Michael O'Farrell, Eastern Promises; Martin Pinsonnault, Pierre-Jules Audet, Michelle Cloutier, Simon Meilleur and Louis Molinas, Nitro; Marie-Claude Gagné, Diane Boucher, Guy Francoeur, Claire Pochon and Jean-Philippe Savard, Gounod's Roméo et Juliette; Marcel Pothier, Guy Francoeur, Antoine Morin, Guy Pelletier and François B. Senneville, Shake Hands With the Devil; Steve Munro, Paul Shikata, John Sievert and David Drainie Taylor, The Tracey Fragments
Achievement in Music: Original Score	Achievement in Music: Original Song
Howard Shore, Eastern Promises; Don MacDonald, Fido; David Hirschfelder, Shake Hands With the Devil; Ryûichi Sakamoto, Silk; Steve London, That Beautiful Somewhere	Valanga Khoza and David Hirschfelder, "Kaya" (Shake Hands With the Devil); Byron Wong and Luke Nicholson, "Breathe" (Poor Boy's Game); Alan Doyle, "Young Triffie's Been Made Away With" (Young Triffie)
Documentary	Special awards
Gary Burns, Jim Brown, Bonnie Thompson and Shirley Vercruysse, Radiant City; André-Line Beauparlant and Danielle Leblanc, Antlers (Panache); Rob Stewart, Sharkwater	Achievement in Make-Up: Stéphan Dupuis, Eastern Promises; Claude Jutra Award: Sarah Polley, Away from Her; Golden Reel Award: The 3 L'il Pigs (Les 3 p'tits cochons); Special Award: Harry Gulkin
