= Canadian Screen Award for Best Sound Mixing =

Annual Canadian film award

- Country: Canada
- Presented by: Academy of Canadian Cinema & Television
- First award: 1968
- Currently held by: Rudy Michael, Lucas Roveda, Dave Mercel & Adam Clark for Nirvanna the Band the Show the Movie (2025)
- Website: academy.ca/awards

The Canadian Screen Award for Best Achievement in Sound Mixing is awarded by the Academy of Canadian Cinema and Television to the best work by a sound designer in a Canadian film. Formerly known as Best Overall Sound, it was renamed to Best Sound Mixing at the 9th Canadian Screen Awards in 2021.

== 1960s ==
Year	Nominee	Film	Ref
1968; 20th Canadian Film Awards
1968; 20th Canadian Film Awards	Serge Beauchemin, Alain Dostie	The Times That Are (Le règne du jour)	
1969; 21st Canadian Film Awards
1969; 21st Canadian Film Awards	No award presented this year		

== 1970s ==
Year	Nominee	Film	Ref
1970; 22nd Canadian Film Awards
1970; 22nd Canadian Film Awards	David Howells, Ron Alexander, Roger Lamoureux	The Act of the Heart	
1971; 23rd Canadian Film Awards
1971; 23rd Canadian Film Awards	Roger Lamoureux	Mon oncle Antoine	
1972; 24th Canadian Film Awards
1972; 24th Canadian Film Awards	Claude Hazanavicius	The Time of the Hunt (Le Temps d'une chasse)	
1972; 24th Canadian Film Awards	Paul Coombe, Ian Jacobson	Face-Off	
1973; 25th Canadian Film Awards
1973; 25th Canadian Film Awards	Jean Rival	Unfinished Infonie (L'Infonie inachevée...)	
1973; 25th Canadian Film Awards	Joe Grimaldi	Paperback Hero	
1974
1974	No award presented		
1975; 26th Canadian Film Awards
1975; 26th Canadian Film Awards	Patrick Rousseau, Stephen Dalby	The Apprenticeship of Duddy Kravitz	
1975; 26th Canadian Film Awards	Stephen Dalby	Eliza's Horoscope	
1976; 27th Canadian Film Awards
1976; 27th Canadian Film Awards	Henri Blondeau, Richard Voriser, Stephen Dalby	Lies My Father Told Me	
1977; 28th Canadian Film Awards
1977; 28th Canadian Film Awards	Claude Hazanavicius	One Man	
1977; 28th Canadian Film Awards	Jean-Pierre Joutel	J.A. Martin Photographer (J.A. Martin, photographe)	
1978; 29th Canadian Film Awards
1978; 29th Canadian Film Awards	David Lee	The Silent Partner	
1978; 29th Canadian Film Awards	Tony van den Akker, Paul Coombe	Three Card Monte	

== 1980s ==
Year	Nominee	Film	Ref
1980; 1st Genie Awards
1980; 1st Genie Awards	Karl Scherer, Austin Grimaldi, Dino Pigat, Joe Grimaldi	The Changeling	
1980; 1st Genie Awards	Gary Bourgeois, Richard Lightstone	Meatballs	
1980; 1st Genie Awards	Bryan Day, Joe Grimaldi	The Brood	
1980; 1st Genie Awards	Joe Grimaldi, David Appleby	Murder by Decree	
1980; 1st Genie Awards	Owen Langevin, Joe Grimaldi, David Appleby	Running	
1981; 2nd Genie Awards
1981; 2nd Genie Awards	Michel Descombes, Henri Blondeau	Good Riddance (Les bons débarras)	
1981; 2nd Genie Awards	Austin Grimaldi, Dino Pigat, David Appleby, Bo Harwood	Terror Train	
1981; 2nd Genie Awards	Joe Grimaldi, Austin Grimaldi, Dino Pigat, David Lee	Tribute	
1981; 2nd Genie Awards	Mike Hoogenboom, Nolan Roberts, Doug Ganton	The Kidnapping of the President	
1981; 2nd Genie Awards	Patrick Rousseau, Michel Descombes	The Lucky Star	
1981; 2nd Genie Awards	Larry Sutton, Paul Coombe, Mike Hoogenboom	The Hounds of Notre Dame	
1982; 3rd Genie Awards
1982; 3rd Genie Awards	Dan Goldberg, Joe Grimaldi, Gordon Thompson, Austin Grimaldi	Heavy Metal	
1982; 3rd Genie Awards	Peter Burgess	Scanners	
1982; 3rd Genie Awards	Marc Chiasson, Bruce Carwardine, Glen Gauthier	Ticket to Heaven	
1982; 3rd Genie Awards	Claude Langlois, Paul Dion, Marcel Pothier, Robin Leigh	Heartaches	
1982; 3rd Genie Awards	Michael O'Farrell, Wayne Griffin, Dennis Drummond	The Amateur	
1983; 4th Genie Awards
1983; 4th Genie Awards	Kenneth Heeley-Ray, Claude Hazanavicius, Austin Grimaldi, Don White, Joe Grimaldi	Quest for Fire	
1983; 4th Genie Awards	Paul Coombe, Jack Heeren, Al Ormerod, Bryan Day	Threshold	
1983; 4th Genie Awards	Dino Pigat, Terry Burke, David Appleby, Serge Beauchemin	A Day in a Taxi (Un Journée en taxi)	
1983; 4th Genie Awards	Don White, David Appleby, Rod Haykin	Harry Tracy, Desperado	
1983; 4th Genie Awards	Rob Young, Austin Grimaldi, Joe Grimaldi	The Grey Fox	
1984; 5th Genie Awards
1984; 5th Genie Awards	Austin Grimaldi, Bruce Carwardine, Glen Gauthier, Joe Grimaldi, Jim Hopkins	The Terry Fox Story	
1984; 5th Genie Awards	David Appleby, Dino Pigat, Lars Ekstrom	Ups and Downs	
1984; 5th Genie Awards	Austin Grimaldi, Dino Pigat, Joe Grimaldi, Patrick Rousseau	Maria Chapdelaine	
1984; 5th Genie Awards	Dino Pigat, David Appleby, Kenneth Heeley-Ray	A Christmas Story	
1984; 5th Genie Awards	Hans Peter Strobl	The Wars	
1985; 6th Genie Awards
1985; 6th Genie Awards	Bruce Nyznik, Hans Peter Strobl, Richard Besse	Mario	
1985; 6th Genie Awards	Austin Grimaldi, Don White, Serge Beauchemin	The Dog Who Stopped the War (La Guerre des tuques)	
1985; 6th Genie Awards	Joe Grimaldi, Dino Pigat, Austin Grimaldi, Richard Lightstone	Draw!	
1985; 6th Genie Awards	Christopher Tate, David Appleby, Don White, Garrell Clark	Isaac Littlefeathers	
1985; 6th Genie Awards	Don White, Patrick Rousseau, David Appleby	The Bay Boy	
1986; 7th Genie Awards
1986; 7th Genie Awards	Glen Gauthier, Bruce Carwardine, Joe Grimaldi, David Appleby, Bruce Nyznik, Don White	One Magic Christmas	
1986; 7th Genie Awards	Austin Grimaldi, Don Cohen, Joe Grimaldi, Dino Pigat	Joshua Then and Now	
1986; 7th Genie Awards	Paul Sharpe, Garrell Clark	My American Cousin	
1987; 8th Genie Awards
1987; 8th Genie Awards	Adrian Croll, Jean-Pierre Joutel, Richard Besse	The Decline of the American Empire (Le Déclin de l'empire américain)	
1987; 8th Genie Awards	Peter Clements, David Appleby, Don White	Abducted	
1987; 8th Genie Awards	Michael O'Farrell, Gordon Thompson, Don White, David Appleby	The Pink Chiquitas	
1987; 8th Genie Awards	Hans Oomes, Richard Nichol, Shelley Craig, Jean-Pierre Joutel	Sitting in Limbo	
1988; 9th Genie Awards
1988; 9th Genie Awards	Adrian Croll, Hans Peter Strobl, Yvon Benoit	Night Zoo (Un Zoo la nuit)	
1988; 9th Genie Awards	David Appleby, Daniel Latour	Too Outrageous	
1988; 9th Genie Awards	Marvin Bearns, Lars Ekstrom, Tony Van Den Akker	Hello Mary Lou: Prom Night II	
1988; 9th Genie Awards	Andre Gagnon, Michel Charron, Jo Caron, Michel Descombes	The Young Magician	
1988; 9th Genie Awards	Michelle Moses, Egidio Coccimiglio, Gordon Thompson	I've Heard the Mermaids Singing	
1989; 10th Genie Awards
1989; 10th Genie Awards	Bryan Day, Andy Nelson, Don White	Dead Ringers	
1989; 10th Genie Awards	Keith Elliott, Austin Grimaldi, Dino Pigat, Don Cohen	The Kiss	
1989; 10th Genie Awards	Michael Liotta, Don White, Gabor Vadnay, Joe Grimaldi	Obsessed	
1989; 10th Genie Awards	Michael Liotta, Don White, Aerlyn Weissman	A Winter Tan	
1989; 10th Genie Awards	Eli Yarkoni, Dino Pigat, Joe Grimaldi, Michael Liotta	Iron Eagle II	

== 1990s ==
Year	Nominee	Film	Ref
1990; 11th Genie Awards
1990; 11th Genie Awards	Jo Caron, Hans Peter Strobl, Adrian Croll, Patrick Rousseau	Jesus of Montreal (Jésus de Montréal)	
1990; 11th Genie Awards	Garrell Clark, Peter Kelly, Paul Massey	Bye Bye Blues	
1990; 11th Genie Awards	Douglas Ganton, Don White, Paul Coombe, Marvin Berns	Millennium	
1990; 11th Genie Awards	Joe Grimaldi, Peter Shewchuk, Sal Grimaldi, Dino Pigat	Termini Station	
1991; 12th Genie Awards
1991; 12th Genie Awards	Garrell Clark, Paul A. Sharpe	Angel Square	
1991; 12th Genie Awards	Jo Caron, Yvon Benoît, Michel Descombes	Love Me (Love-moi)	
1991; 12th Genie Awards	Michel Descombes, Luc Boudrias, Jo Caron, Richard Besse	Moody Beach	
1991; 12th Genie Awards	Jean-Pierre Joutel, John P. Megill, Adrian Croll	Beautiful Dreamers	
1991; 12th Genie Awards	Larry Sutton, Bill Sheppard, Paul A. Sharpe	The Legend of Kootenai Brown	
1992; 13th Genie Awards
1992; 13th Genie Awards	Peter Maxwell, Bryan Day, David Appleby and Don White	Naked Lunch	
1992; 13th Genie Awards	Yvon Benoît, Jo Caron, Jack Jullian, Hans Peter Strobl	Léolo	
1992; 13th Genie Awards	Jo Caron, Michel Descombes, Michel Charron, Luc Boudrias	Being at Home with Claude	
1992; 13th Genie Awards	Dean Giammarco, Patrick Ramsay, Paul A. Sharpe, Bill Sheppard	North of Pittsburgh	
1992; 13th Genie Awards	John Martin, Don White, Lou Solakofski, David Appleby	South of Wawa	
1993; 14th Genie Awards
1993; 14th Genie Awards	Jo Caron, Hans Peter Strobl, Richard Besse	The Sex of the Stars (Le Sexe des étoiles)	
1993; 14th Genie Awards	Jessica Cassavant, Bryan Day, Ao Loo, Joe Grimaldi	I Love a Man in Uniform	
1993; 14th Genie Awards	Dean Giammarco, Daryl Powell, Paul Sharpe, Bill Sheppard	Harmony Cats	
1993; 14th Genie Awards	Dino Pigat, Lou Solakofski, Douglas Ganton, David Appleby	La Florida	
1993; 14th Genie Awards	Bill Sheppard, Michael McGee, Dean Giammarco, Paul Sharpe	The Lotus Eaters	
1994; 15th Genie Awards
1994; 15th Genie Awards	Paul Sharpe, Bill Sheppard, Daryl Powell, Dean Giammarco	Whale Music	
1994; 15th Genie Awards	Jo Caron, Hans Kuenzi, Florian Eidenbenz, Francois Musy	Desire in Motion (Mouvements du désir)	
1994; 15th Genie Awards	Keith Elliott, Daniel Pellerin, Peter Kelly, Ross Redfern	Exotica	
1994; 15th Genie Awards	Dean Giammarco, Paul Sharpe, Garrell Clark, Bill Sheppard	Road to Saddle River	
1994; 15th Genie Awards	Réjean Juteau, Luc Boudrias, Richard Besse, Michel Descombes	A Hero's Life (La Vie d'un héros)	
1994; 15th Genie Awards	Hans Peter Strobl, Louis Hone, Dominique Chartrand, Jacques Drouin	Matusalem	
1995; 16th Genie Awards
1995; 16th Genie Awards	Michael McGee, Paul A. Sharpe, Kelly Cole, Dean Giammarco	Magic in the Water	
1995; 16th Genie Awards	Keith Elliott, Peter Kelly, Daniel Pellerin, Ross Redfern	Dance Me Outside	
1995; 16th Genie Awards	Gavin Fernandes, Luc Boudrias, Daniel Masse, Michel Descombes	Black List (Liste noire)	
1995; 16th Genie Awards	Jean-Claude Laureux, Jo Caron, Hans Peter Strobl	The Confessional (Le Confessionnal)	
1995; 16th Genie Awards	Don White, Douglas Ganton, Leslie Shatz, Scott Purdy	Johnny Mnemonic	
1996; 17th Genie Awards
1996; 17th Genie Awards	Don Cohen, Keith Elliot, Scott Purdy, Scott Shepherd, Don White	Lilies	
1996; 17th Genie Awards	David Appleby, Bruce Carwardine, Tim O'Connell, Don White	Kids in the Hall: Brain Candy	
1996; 17th Genie Awards	Jo Caron, Claude Hazanavicius, John Netsorwich, Hans Peter Strobl	Polygraph (Le Polygraphe)	
1996; 17th Genie Awards	Kelly Cole, Dean Giammarco, Jochen Schlissler, Paul Sharpe	Hard Core Logo	
1996; 17th Genie Awards	Christian Cooke, David Lee, Dino Pigat, Lou Solakofski, Orest Sushko	Crash	
1997; 18th Genie Awards
1997; 18th Genie Awards	Daniel Pellerin, Keith Elliott, Peter Kelly, Ross Redfern	The Sweet Hereafter	
1997; 18th Genie Awards	Luc Boudrias, Don Cohen, Jo Caron, Bruno Ruffolo	Karmina	
1997; 18th Genie Awards	Dominique Chartrand, Jo Caron, Hans Peter Strobl	The Countess of Baton Rouge (La Comtesse de Bâton Rouge)	
1997; 18th Genie Awards	Peter Harper, Philippe Espantoso, Georges Hannan	The Hanging Garden	
1997; 18th Genie Awards	Hans Peter Strobl, Daniel Bisson, Jo Caron, Marcel Chouinard	The Seat of the Soul (Le siège de l'âme)	
1998; 19th Genie Awards
1998; 19th Genie Awards	Claude La Haye, Jo Caron, Bernard Gariépy Strobl, Hans Peter Strobl	The Red Violin	
1998; 19th Genie Awards	Henry Embry, Steph Carrier, Lou Solakofski, Orest Sushko	Such a Long Journey	
1998; 19th Genie Awards	Darcy Kite, Peter Kelly, Steve McNamee, Todd Warren	Cube	
1998; 19th Genie Awards	Louis Kramer, Todd Beckett, Tim O'Connell, Scott Purdy	Regeneration	
1998; 19th Genie Awards	John J. Thomson, Dean Giammarco, Miguel Nunes, Paul A. Sharpe	Last Night	
1999; 20th Genie Awards
1999; 20th Genie Awards	Daniel Pellerin, Keith Elliott, Glen Gauthier, Peter Kelly	Sunshine	
1999; 20th Genie Awards	Serge Beauchemin, Bernard Gariépy Strobl, Hans Peter Strobl	Memories Unlocked (Souvenirs intimes)	
1999; 20th Genie Awards	Michel Descombes, Jo Caron, Michel Charron, Gavin Fernandes	The Last Breath	
1999; 20th Genie Awards	Daniel Pellerin, Keith Elliott, Peter Kelly, Brian Simmons	Felicia's Journey	
1999; 20th Genie Awards	Philip Norman Stall, Martin Lee, Lou Solakofski	The Five Senses	

== 2000s ==
Year	Nominee	Film	Ref
2000; 21st Genie Awards
2000; 21st Genie Awards	Daniel Pellerin, Paul Adlaf, Peter Kelly, Brad Thornton, Brad Zoern	Love Come Down	
2000; 21st Genie Awards	Gilles Corbeil, Luc Boudrias, Louis Gignac	Maelström	
2000; 21st Genie Awards	Tom Ronan, Daniel Pellerin, Brad Thornton, Brad Zoern	Violet	
2000; 21st Genie Awards	Bill Sheppard, Mark Berger, Ruth Huddleston	Here's to Life!	
2000; 21st Genie Awards	Hans Peter Strobl, Jo Caron, Don Cohen, Bernard Gariépy Strobl	The Art of War	
2001; 22nd Genie Awards
2001; 22nd Genie Awards	Todd Beckett, Christian Carruthers, Herwig Gayer, Bissa Scekic, Todd Warren	Treed Murray	
2001; 22nd Genie Awards	Pierre Blain, Michel Descombes, Réjean Juteau	The Hidden Fortress	
2001; 22nd Genie Awards	Luc Boudrias, Yvon Benoît, Jo Caron, Benoit Leduc	Karmina 2	
2001; 22nd Genie Awards	Dominique Chartrand, Luc Boudrias, Bernard Gariépy Strobl, Hans Peter Strobl	A Girl at the Window (Une jeune fille à la fenêtre)	
2001; 22nd Genie Awards	Richard Lavoie, Serge Boivin, Jean Paul Vialard	Atanarjuat: The Fast Runner	
2002; 23rd Genie Awards
2002; 23rd Genie Awards	Thomas Hidderley, Todd Beckett, Keith Elliott, Mark Zsifkovits	Between Strangers	
2002; 23rd Genie Awards	Serge Beauchemin, Bruno Ruffolo, Bernard Gariépy Strobl, Hans Peter Strobl	Les Boys III	
2002; 23rd Genie Awards	Serge Beauchemin, Bernard Gariépy Strobl, Hans Peter Strobl	The Collector (Le Collectionneur)	
2002; 23rd Genie Awards	Gavin Fernandes, Bobby O'Malley, Philippe Pelletier	Inside (Histoire de pen)	
2002; 23rd Genie Awards	Glen Gauthier, Christian Cooke, Orest Sushko, Don White	Spider	
2002; 23rd Genie Awards	Lou Solakofski, Steph Carrier	Max	
2003; 24th Genie Awards
2003; 24th Genie Awards	Bruce Carwardine, Todd Beckett, Michael O'Farrell, Don White	The Statement	
2003; 24th Genie Awards	Michel Descombes, Gavin Fernandes, Patrick Rousseau	The Barbarian Invasions (Les Invasions barbares)	
2003; 24th Genie Awards	Chris Duesterdiek, Mark Berger, Dean Giammarco, Bill Sheppard	The Snow Walker	
2003; 24th Genie Awards	Claude Hazanavicius, Michel Descombes	Seducing Doctor Lewis (La Grande séduction)	
2003; 24th Genie Awards	Warren St. Onge, Steph Carrier, Lou Solakofski	Falling Angels	
2004; 25th Genie Awards
2004; 25th Genie Awards	Dominique Chartrand, Gavin Fernandes and Pierre Paquet	The Last Tunnel (Le Dernier tunnel)	
2004; 25th Genie Awards	Pierre Blain, Jo Caron, Michel Descombes, Gavin Fernandes	Head in the Clouds	
2004; 25th Genie Awards	Christian Bouchard, Luc Boudrias, Jo Caron, Clovis Gouaillier, Benoît Leduc	Looking for Alexander (Mémoires affectives)	
2004; 25th Genie Awards	Dean Humphreys, Todd Beckett, David Lee	Resident Evil: Apocalypse	
2004; 25th Genie Awards	Nicole Thompson, Jeff Carter, Brad Hillman, Miguel Nunes	Émile	
2005; 26th Genie Awards
2005; 26th Genie Awards	Yvon Benoît, Daniel Bisson, Luc Boudrias, Bernard Gariépy Strobl	C.R.A.Z.Y.	
2005; 26th Genie Awards	Leon Johnson, Bruce Little, Howard Rissin	Seven Times Lucky	
2005; 26th Genie Awards	Chris Munro, John Hazen, Daniel Pellerin, Jan Rudy	Where the Truth Lies	
2005; 26th Genie Awards	Daniel Pellerin, John Hazen, Jan Rudy, Bisa Skecic	Lie With Me	
2005; 26th Genie Awards	Greg Stewart, Michael McCann, Michael Thomas	It's All Gone Pete Tong	
2006; 27th Genie Awards
2006; 27th Genie Awards	Dominique Chartrand, Gavin Fernandes, Nathalie Morin, Pierre Paquet	Bon Cop, Bad Cop	
2006; 27th Genie Awards	Claude Hazanavicius, Claude Beaugrand, Luc Boudrias, Bernard Gariépy Strobl	The Rocket (Maurice Richard)	
2006; 27th Genie Awards	David Lee, Douglas Cooper, Robert Farr	Tideland	
2006; 27th Genie Awards	Daniel Pellerin, Gashtaseb Ariana, Jeff Carter	Eve and the Fire Horse	
2006; 27th Genie Awards	Hans Peter Strobl, Jo Caron, Claude La Haye, Benoît Leduc, Bernard Gariépy Strobl	A Sunday in Kigali	
2007; 28th Genie Awards
2007; 28th Genie Awards	Stuart Wilson, Christian Cooke, Orest Sushko, Mark Zsifkovits	Eastern Promises	
2007; 28th Genie Awards	Eric Fitz, Jo Caron, Gavin Fernandes, Benoît Leduc	Shake Hands With the Devil	
2007; 28th Genie Awards	John Hazen, Matt Chan, Brad Dawe	The Tracey Fragments	
2007; 28th Genie Awards	Claude La Haye, Olivier Calvert, Bernard Gariépy Strobl, Hans Peter Strobl	Silk	
2007; 28th Genie Awards	John J. Thomson, Stephan Carrier, Martin Lee	Citizen Duane	
2008; 29th Genie Awards
2008; 29th Genie Awards	Lou Solakofski, Garrell Clark, Steve Foster	Passchendaele	
2008; 29th Genie Awards	Mario Auclair, Luc Boudrias, François Senneville	Le Banquet	
2008; 29th Genie Awards	Claude La Haye, Daniel Bisson, Luc Boudrias, Patrick Lalonde	The American Trap (Le Piège américain)	
2008; 29th Genie Awards	Sanjay Mehta, Stephan Carrier, Kirk Lynds	Amal	
2008; 29th Genie Awards	David Ottier, Daniel Prado Villar	This Beautiful City	
2009; 30th Genie Awards
2009; 30th Genie Awards	Stéphane Bergeron, Pierre Blain, Jo Caron, Benoît Leduc	Polytechnique	
2009; 30th Genie Awards	Mario Auclair, Daniel Bisson, Luc Boudrias, Jean-Charles Desjardins	The Master Key (Grande Ourse: La Clé des possibles)	
2009; 30th Genie Awards	Simon Goulet, Bernard Gariépy Strobl	5150 Elm's Way (5150, rue des Ormes)	
2009; 30th Genie Awards	Claude Hazanavicius, Daniel Bisson, Jean-Charles Desjardins, Bernard Gariépy Strobl	Love and Savagery	
2009; 30th Genie Awards	Richard Lavoie, Arnaud Derimay, Jean-Charles Desjardins, Bernard Gariépy Strobl	Before Tomorrow (Le Jour avant le lendemain)	

== 2010s ==
Year	Nominee	Film	Ref
2010; 31st Genie Awards
2010; 31st Genie Awards	Jean Umansky, Jo Caron, Jean-Pierre Laforce, Benoit Leduc	Incendies	
2010; 31st Genie Awards	Christian Cooke, Greg Chapman, Steve Moore	Defendor	
2010; 31st Genie Awards	Leon Johnson, Stephan Carrier, Kirk Lynds	High Life	
2010; 31st Genie Awards	Michel Lecoufle, Daniel Bisson, Luc Boudrias, Jean-Charles Desjardins	7 Days (Les 7 jours du Talion)	
2010; 31st Genie Awards	John Thomson, Andrew Stirk, Andrew Tay, Mark Zsifkovits	Resident Evil: Afterlife	
2011; 32nd Genie Awards
2011; 32nd Genie Awards	Orest Sushko, Christian Cooke	A Dangerous Method	
2011; 32nd Genie Awards	Stéphane Bergeron, Yann Cleary, Lise Wedlock	Wetlands (Marécages)	
2011; 32nd Genie Awards	Pierre Bertrand, Shaun Nicholas Gallagher, Bernard Gariépy Strobl	Monsieur Lazhar	
2011; 32nd Genie Awards	Jean Minondo, Jo Caron, Gavin Fernandes, Louis Gignac	Café de Flore	
2011; 32nd Genie Awards	Lou Solakofski, Stephan Carrier, Kirk Lynds	The Bang Bang Club	
2012; 1st Canadian Screen Awards
2012; 1st Canadian Screen Awards	Claude La Haye, Daniel Bisson, Bernard Gariépy Strobl	War Witch (Rebelle)	
2012; 1st Canadian Screen Awards	Sylvain Arseneault, Steph Carrier, Lou Solakofski, Don White	Midnight's Children	
2012; 1st Canadian Screen Awards	Olivier Calvert, Pascal Beaudin, Luc Boudrias	Mars and April (Mars et Avril)	
2012; 1st Canadian Screen Awards	Zander Rosborough, Allan Scarth	The Disappeared	
2012; 1st Canadian Screen Awards	Philip Stall, Ian Rankin, Lou Solakofski	Antiviral	
2013; 2nd Canadian Screen Awards
2013; 2nd Canadian Screen Awards	Andrew Tay, David Drage, David Giammarco, Greg Chapman, Matt McKenzie, Peter Persaud	The Mortal Instruments: City of Bones	
2013; 2nd Canadian Screen Awards	Arnaud Derimay, Benoît Leduc, Stéphane Bergeron	Amsterdam	
2013; 2nd Canadian Screen Awards	Bernard Gariépy Strobl, Pierre Bertrand	Gabrielle	
2013; 2nd Canadian Screen Awards	François Grenon, Olivier Goinard, Sevan Koryan, Sylvain Brassard	Tom at the Farm (Tom à la ferme)	
2013; 2nd Canadian Screen Awards	Joe Morrow, Lalit Malik, Lou Solakofski	Siddharth	
2014; 3rd Canadian Screen Awards
2014; 3rd Canadian Screen Awards	Greg Chapman, Peter Persaud, Andrew Stirk, Andrew Tay, Mark Zsifkovits	Pompeii	
2014; 3rd Canadian Screen Awards	Daniel Bisson, Gilles Corbeil, Bernard Gariépy Strobl	Meetings with a Young Poet	
2014; 3rd Canadian Screen Awards	Sylvain Brassard, Jo Caron, François Grenon, Luc Landry	Mommy	
2014; 3rd Canadian Screen Awards	Christian Cooke, Michael O'Farrell, Orest Sushko	Maps to the Stars	
2014; 3rd Canadian Screen Awards	Christopher Guglick, Dave Mercel, Steve Moore, Justin Sawyer, Alex Turner	Bang Bang Baby	
2015; 4th Canadian Screen Awards
2015; 4th Canadian Screen Awards	Lou Solakofski, Ian Rankin, Joe Morrow, Russ Dyck, Graham Rogers, James Bastable, André Azoubel, Don White, Jack Heeren	Hyena Road	
2015; 4th Canadian Screen Awards	Sylvain Brassard, Arnaud Têtu, Pascal Van Strydonck, Olivier Léger	Adrien (Le Garagiste)	
2015; 4th Canadian Screen Awards	Bernard Gariépy Strobl, Daniel Bisson, Jean-Charles Desjardins, François Grenon	Endorphine	
2015; 4th Canadian Screen Awards	Bernard Gariépy Strobl, Daniel Bisson, Claude La Haye, Benoît Leduc	My Internship in Canada (Guibord s'en va-t'en guerre)	
2015; 4th Canadian Screen Awards	Lou Solakofski, Kirk Lynds, Kristian Bailey, Don White, Jack Heeren, Rob Coxford, Peter Caristedt	Into the Forest	
2016; 5th Canadian Screen Awards
2016; 5th Canadian Screen Awards	Claude La Haye, Luc Boudrias, Pierre-Jules Audet	Race	
2016; 5th Canadian Screen Awards	Sylvain Brassard, Michel Lecoufle, Stephen De Oliveira, Nicholas Gagnon	King Dave	
2016; 5th Canadian Screen Awards	Matt Chan	Operation Avalanche	
2016; 5th Canadian Screen Awards	Marcel Chouinard, Philippe Lavigne, Stéphane Bergeron, Shaun-Nicholas Gallagher, Louis Collin	Bad Seeds (Les mauvaises herbes)	
2016; 5th Canadian Screen Awards	François Grenon	It's Only the End of the World (Juste la fin du monde)	
2017; 6th Canadian Screen Awards
2017; 6th Canadian Screen Awards	Claude La Haye, Bernard Gariépy Strobl	Hochelaga, Land of Souls (Hochelaga terre des âmes)	
2017; 6th Canadian Screen Awards	Philippe Attié	Boost	
2017; 6th Canadian Screen Awards	Sylvain Bellemare	All You Can Eat Buddha	
2017; 6th Canadian Screen Awards	Pierre Bertrand, Stéphane Bergeron, Shaun-Nicholas Gallagher, Maxime Potvin	Cross My Heart (Les Rois mongols)	
2017; 6th Canadian Screen Awards	Matt Drake, Nate Evans, Christopher O'Brien	Never Steady, Never Still	
2018; 7th Canadian Screen Awards
2018; 7th Canadian Screen Awards	Pierre Mertens, Thomas Gauder, Alexis Oscari	The Hummingbird Project	
2018; 7th Canadian Screen Awards	Stéphane Barsalou, Bernard Gariépy Strobl	With Love (L'Amour)	
2018; 7th Canadian Screen Awards	Gilles Corbeil, Stéphane Bergeron	The Fireflies Are Gone (La disparition des lucioles)	
2018; 7th Canadian Screen Awards	Bernard Gariépy Strobl	Just a Breath Away (Dans la brume)	
2018; 7th Canadian Screen Awards	Michel Lecoufle	1991	
2019; 8th Canadian Screen Awards
2019; 8th Canadian Screen Awards	Claude La Haye, Bernard Gariépy Strobl, Mark Appleby, Daniel Bisson	The Song of Names	
2019; 8th Canadian Screen Awards	Stéphane Bergeron	Antigone	
2019; 8th Canadian Screen Awards	Jean Camden, Sylvain Bellemare, Bernard Gariépy Strobl, Stéphane Larivière	And the Birds Rained Down (Il pleuvait des oiseaux)	
2019; 8th Canadian Screen Awards	Gavin Fernandes, Normand Lapierre	Jouliks	
2019; 8th Canadian Screen Awards	David Ottier, Matt Chan, Graham Rogers	Goalie	

== 2020s ==
Year	Nominee	Film	Ref
2020; 9th Canadian Screen Awards
2020; 9th Canadian Screen Awards	Graham Rogers, James Bastable, Brad Dawe, Daniel Moctezuma	Akilla's Escape	
2020; 9th Canadian Screen Awards	Stephane Bergeron, Yann Cleary	Beans	
2020; 9th Canadian Screen Awards	Matthew Chan	Violation	
2020; 9th Canadian Screen Awards	Colin McLellan, Mark Zsifkovits, Devin Doucette, Daniel Moctezuma, Rachelle Audet, Bertrand Duranleau, Thomas Holroyd, Jeffrey Roy	Random Acts of Violence	
2020; 9th Canadian Screen Awards	Lou Solakofski, Joe Morrow, Randy Wilson, Ron Melgers	Funny Boy	
2021; 10th Canadian Screen Awards
2021; 10th Canadian Screen Awards	Lou Solakofski, Graham Rogers, Stephen Marian, Alexis Feodoroff, Tim Chaproniere	Night Raiders	
2021; 10th Canadian Screen Awards	Joe Morrow, Lou Solakofski, Jonathan St. Clair, Thomas Dube	All My Puny Sorrows	
2021; 10th Canadian Screen Awards	Gavin Fernandes, Pierre Bertrand, Jocelyn Caron, Giuseppe Petrella	Brain Freeze	
2021; 10th Canadian Screen Awards	Bernard Gariépy Strobl, J. R. Fountain and Erik Culp	PAW Patrol: The Movie	
2021; 10th Canadian Screen Awards	Eric Taylor, Miles Roberts, Matt Chan	Scarborough	
2022; 11th Canadian Screen Awards
2022; 11th Canadian Screen Awards	Richard Penn, Joe Morrow, James Bastable	Brother	
2022; 11th Canadian Screen Awards	Pierre Bertrand, Bernard Gariépy Strobl	Viking	
2022; 11th Canadian Screen Awards	Matthew Chan	Stay the Night	
2022; 11th Canadian Screen Awards	Ron Mellegers, Justin Helle, Christian Cooke, Mark Zsifkovits	Crimes of the Future	
2022; 11th Canadian Screen Awards	Martin M. Messier	The Inhuman (L'Inhumain)	
2023; 12th Canadian Screen Awards
2023; 12th Canadian Screen Awards	Matthew Chan, Bret Killoran, Nathan Street, Paul Lynch, Randy Wilson, Ron Mellegers, Justin Helle	BlackBerry	
2023; 12th Canadian Screen Awards	Tyler Bogaert, Ian Rankin, Will Stephens	The Young Arsonists	
2023; 12th Canadian Screen Awards	Bernard Gariépy Strobl, J.R. Fountain	PAW Patrol: The Mighty Movie	
2023; 12th Canadian Screen Awards	Hans Laitres, Guillaume Daoust, Maxime Vermette, Daniel Bisson, Mathieu Maillé	Ru	
2023; 12th Canadian Screen Awards	Brent Planiden, Chris Ferguson	Cold Road	
2024; 13th Canadian Screen Awards
2024; 13th Canadian Screen Awards	Christian Cooke, Mark Zsifkovits, Trevor Goulet, Peter Persaud, Daniel Moctezuma	The Shrouds	
2024; 13th Canadian Screen Awards	Julian Ardila, Chris Russell, Brianna Todd, Bret Killoran, Jon Lawless, Dallas Boyes, Diego Colombo	Backspot	
2024; 13th Canadian Screen Awards	Tyler Bogaert, Oliver Wickham	In a Violent Nature	
2024; 13th Canadian Screen Awards	Matthew Chan, Graham Rogers, Trevor Goulet, Randy Wilson, Ron Mellegers, Paul Lynch	Code 8: Part II	
2024; 13th Canadian Screen Awards	Gabe Knox, Ian Reynolds, Paul Lynch, Ron Mellegers	Matt and Mara	
2025; 14th Canadian Screen Awards
2025; 14th Canadian Screen Awards	Rudy Michael, Lucas Roveda, Dave Mercel, Adam Clark	Nirvanna the Band the Show the Movie	
2025; 14th Canadian Screen Awards	Matthew Chan	Honey Bunch	
2025; 14th Canadian Screen Awards	Michelle Irving, Jeremy Fong, Pablo Villegas	Mile End Kicks	
2025; 14th Canadian Screen Awards	Lou Solakofski, Maryan P’yatnochka	Nika and Madison	
2025; 14th Canadian Screen Awards	Brianna Todd, Carter Buckman	Sway	

== See also ==
- Prix Iris for Best Sound
