= 31st Genie Awards =

2011 Canadian film awards ceremony

- Date: March 10, 2011
- Site: National Arts Centre, Ottawa
- Hosted by: William Shatner

Highlights
- Best Picture: Incendies
- Most awards: Incendies (8)
- Most nominations: Barney's Version (11)

Television coverage
- Network: Independent Film Channel, CBC.ca, The Movie Network (delayed broadcast) and Movie Central (delayed broadcast)

The 31st Genie Awards ceremony was held on March 10, 2011 to honour films released in 2010. Nominations were announced on February 2, 2011.

William Shatner was announced as the ceremony's host on February 16.

== Winners and nominees ==
Motion Picture	Direction
Incendies — Luc Déry and Kim McCraw; 10½ — Pierre Gendron; Heartbeats (Les Amours imaginaires) — Xavier Dolan, Carole Mondello and Daniel Morin; Barney's Version — Robert Lantos; Splice — Steven Hoban	Denis Villeneuve, Incendies; Xavier Dolan, Heartbeats (Les Amours imaginaires); Richard J. Lewis, Barney's Version; Vincenzo Natali, Splice; Podz, 10½
Actor in a leading role	Actress in a leading role
Paul Giamatti, Barney's Version; Jay Baruchel, The Trotsky; Robert Naylor, 10½; Timothy Olyphant, High Life; François Papineau, Route 132	Lubna Azabal, Incendies; Tatiana Maslany, Grown Up Movie Star; Molly Parker, Trigger; Rosamund Pike, Barney's Version; Tracy Wright, Trigger
Actor in a supporting role	Actress in a supporting role
Dustin Hoffman, Barney's Version; Martin Dubreuil, 10½; Alexis Martin, Route 132; Callum Keith Rennie, Gunless; Rossif Sutherland, High Life	Minnie Driver, Barney's Version; Sonja Bennett, Cole; Anne-Élisabeth Bossé, Heartbeats (Les Amours imaginaires); Terra Hazelton, FUBAR 2; Mary Walsh, Crackie
Original Screenplay	Adapted Screenplay
Jacob Tierney, The Trotsky; Louis Bélanger and Alexis Martin, Route 132; Claude Lalonde, 10½; Adriana Maggs, Grown Up Movie Star; Peter Stebbings, Defendor	Denis Villeneuve, Incendies; Michael Konyves, Barney's Version; Lee MacDougall, High Life; Vic Sarin, Dennis Foon and Catherine Spear, A Shine of Rainbows; Patrick Senécal, 7 Days (Les 7 jours du Talion)
Best Live Action Short Drama	Best Animated Short
Lisa Jackson, Lauren Grant and Lori Lozinski, Savage; John Christou and Jeff Barnaby, File Under Miscellaneous; Emanuel Hoss-Desmarais and Vincent Hoss-Desmarais, Marius Borodine; Kazik Radwanski and Daniel Montgomery, Out in That Deep Blue Sea; Kaveh Nabatian, Cédric Bourdeau and Stéphane Tanguay, Vapor	Theodore Ushev and Marc Bertrand, Lipsett Diaries; Claude Cloutier and Marc Bertrand, The Trenches (La Tranchée)
Art Direction/Production Design	Cinematography
Claude Paré and Élise de Blois, Barney's Version; Gilles Aird, 10½; André-Line Beauparlant, Incendies; Arvinder Grewal, Resident Evil: Afterlife; Myron Hyrak, FUBAR 2	André Turpin, Incendies; Bernard Couture, 10½; Ronald Plante, Piché: The Landing of a Man (Piché: entre ciel et terre); Claudine Sauvé, The Wild Hunt; Stéphanie Weber Biron, Heartbeats (Les Amours imaginaires)
Costume Design	Editing
Nicoletta Massone, Barney's Version; Denise Cronenberg, Resident Evil: Afterlife; Mario Davignon, The Trotsky; Patricia McNeil, The Wild Hunt; Beverly Wowchuk, Gunless	Monique Dartonne, Incendies; Michele Conroy, Splice; Matthew Hannam, Trigger; Valérie Héroux, 10½; Yvann Thibaudeau, Piché: The Landing of a Man (Piché: entre ciel et terre)
Overall Sound	Sound Editing
Jean Umansky and Jean-Pierre Laforce, Incendies; Christian Cooke and Steve Moore, Defendor; Leon Johnson, Stephan Carrier and Kirk Lynds, High Life; Michel Lecoufle, Daniel Bisson, Luc Boudrias and Jean-Charles Desjardins, 7 Days (Les 7 jours du Talion); John Thomson, Andrew Stirk, Andrew Tay and Mark Zsifkovits, Resident Evil: Afterlife	Sylvain Bellemare, Simon Meilleur and Claire Pochon, Incendies; Pierre-Jules Audet, Michelle Cloutier, Natalie Fleurant and Nicolas Gagnon, 7 Days (Les 7 jours du Talion); Stephen Barden, Steve Baine, Kevin Banks, Alex Bullick and Jill Purdy, Resident Evil: Afterlife; Mark Gingras, Tom Bjelic, Katrijn Halliday, Dale Lennon and John Smith, Defendor; Dave Rose and David McCallum, Splice
Achievement in Music: Original Score	Achievement in Music: Original Song
Pasquale Catalano, Barney's Version; Brendan Canning, Trigger; Jonathan Goldsmith, High Life; Keegan Jessamy and Bryce Mitchell, At Home by Myself...With You; Sook-Yin Lee, Buck 65 and Adam Litovitz, Year of the Carnivore	Mary Milne, "Already Gone" (The Trotsky); Buck 65, "What's Wrong with That?" (Year of the Carnivore); Cherie Pyne, "Tender Steps" (Crackie); Mark Sasso, Casey Laforet and Stephen Pitkin, "West End Sky" (Grown Up Movie Star); Paul Spence, "There's No Place Like Christmas" (FUBAR 2)
Best Documentary	Achievement in Make-Up
Last Train Home — Lixin Fan, Mila Aung-Thwin and Daniel Cross; In the Name of the Family — Shelley Saywell and Deborah Parks; Journey's End (La Belle Visite) — Jean-François Caissy; Leave Them Laughing — John Zaritsky and Montana Berg; You Don't Like the Truth: Four Days Inside Guantanamo — Luc Côté and Patricio Henríquez	Adrien Morot and Micheline Trépanier, Barney's Version; Kathryn Casault, Incendies; Paul Jones, Leslie Sebert and Vincent Sullivan, Resident Evil: Afterlife; Hélène-Manon Poudrette, The Wild Hunt; Marlène Rouleau and C.J. Goldman, 7 Days (Les 7 jours du Talion)
Claude Jutra Award	Golden Reel Award
Jephté Bastien, Exit 67 (Sortie 67)	Resident Evil: Afterlife
