= Orest Sushko =

Canadian sound engineer

Orest Sushko is a Canadian re-recording mixer working in the fields of film, television, and music. He holds a Bachelor's Degree from McMaster University in Hamilton, Ontario and an M.A. degree in media production from Ryerson University in Toronto.

Orest won the Emmy award for Best Sound Mixing for the TV miniseries Nuremberg and was nominated for an Emmy for the TV miniseries Joan of Arc. He is the recipient of 9 MPSE nominations, @MPSE awards, 2 International Monitor Awards Finalist Citations, 12 Gemini nominations, 3 Genie nominations, 4 CSA (Canadian Screen Awards) nominations and a Golden Sheaf Award. Orest has mixed seven films for David Cronenberg, including Crash, Spider, A History of Violence, Eastern Promises, A Dangerous Method, Cosmopolis, and Maps to the Stars. He has also mixed films and TV pilots for Barry Sonnenfeld and Guillermo del Toro. He won the 2007 Genie Award for Best Achievement in Overall Sound for David Cronenberg's 'Eastern Promises' and the 2011 Genie Award for Best Achievement in Overall Sound for Cronenberg's 'A Dangerous Method'.

In 2014, after more than a decade of work, he completed Music of Survival: The Story of the Ukrainian Bandurist Chorus, a documentary tracing the history of the musical instrument known as the bandura, a traditional musical instrument from his Ukrainian heritage.

== Recognition ==
- 2008 Genie Award for Best Achievement in Overall Sound - Eastern Promises - Won (shared with Stuart Wilson, Christian Cooke, Mark Zsifkovits)
- 2003 Genie Award for Best Achievement in Overall Sound - Spider - Nominated (shared with Glen Gauthier, Christian T. Cooke, Don White)
- 2001 Emmy Award for Outstanding Single Camera Sound Mixing for a Miniseries or a Movie - Nuremberg part II - Won (shared with Lou Solakofski (re-recording mixer), Ian Rankin (re-recording mixer))
- 2001 Gemini Award for Best Overall Sound in a Dramatic Program or Series - Nuremberg - Nominated (shared with Ian Rankin, Lou Solakofski, Claude La Haye)
- 2000 Gemini Award for Best Overall Sound in a Dramatic Program or Series - Dead Aviators - Nominated (shared with Richard Penn, Lou Solakofski)
- 2000 Gemini Award for Best Overall Sound in a Dramatic Program or Series - One Heart Broken Into Song - Nominated (shared with Alex Salter, Lou Solakofski, Jim Rillie)
- 2000 Gemini Award for Best Overall Sound in a Dramatic Program or Series - The Sheldon Kennedy Story - Nominated (shared with Shane Connelly, Dino Pigat)
- 2000 Cinema Audio Society Award for Outstanding Achievement in Sound Mixing for a Television Movie-of-the-Week, Mini-Series or Special - Joan of Arc part I - Won (shared with Lou Solakofski (re-recording mixer), Urmas Rosin (production mixer))
- 1999 Emmy Award for Outstanding Sound Mixing for a Miniseries or a Movie - Joan of Arc part I - Nominated (shared with Lou Solakofski (re-recording mixer), Urmas Rosin (location mixer))
- 1999 Genie Award for Best Overall Sound - Such a Long Journey - Nominated (shared with Henry Embry, Steph Carrier, Lou Solakofski)
- Fall 1998 Gemini Award for Best Sound in a Dramatic Program or Series - Earth: Final Conflict episode Truth - Nominated (shared with Eric Apps, David Rose, Steve Baine, John Douglas Smith, Tom Bjelic, David Yonson)
- Spring 1998 Gemini Award for Best Sound in a Dramatic Program or Series - Dead Silence - Nominated (shared with David Evans, Lou Solakofski, Dan Latour, Tony Currie, David Rose, Steve Baine, David Yonson, John Douglas Smith, Clive Turner
- 1997 Gemini Award for Best Sound in a Dramatic Program or Series - Captive Heart: The James Mink Story - Nominated (shared with Dale Sheldrake, Tom Bjelic, Ao Loo, Lou Solakofski)
- 1997 Gemini Award for Best Sound in a Dramatic Program or Series - Heck's Way Home - Nominated (shared with John Douglas Smith, John Sievert, David Evans, Mark Gingras, Lou Solakofski, Leon Johnson)
- 1996 Gemini Award for Best Sound in a Dramatic Program or Series - Harrison Bergeron - Nominated (shared with Mark Gingras, Wayne Griffin, Lou Solakofski, David Lee)
- 1996 Genie Award for Best Achievement in Overall Sound - Crash - Nominated (shared with Tony Van den Akker, David Lee, Dino Pigat, Lou Solakofski, Christian T. Cooke)
- 1994 Gemini Award for Best Sound in a Dramatic Program or Series - Lifeline to Victory - Nominated (shared with Jim Rillie, Rick Ellis, Anthony Lancett, Gary Daprato)
