= Justin Craig =

Canadian actor and art director

Justin Craig is a production designer, set decorator, art director and actor. He is nominated for a Genie Award for Best Achievement in Art Direction/Production Design for Shake Hands with the Devil (with Lindsey Hermer-Bell).

== Recognition ==
- 2007 Genie Award for Best Achievement in Art Direction/Production Design - Shake Hands with the Devil
