= Dead Silence (1997 film) =

1997 television film directed by Daniel Petrie Jr.

- Genre: Crime; Thriller
- Based on: A Maiden's Grave by Jeffery Deaver
- Written by: Donald E. Stewart
- Directed by: Daniel Petrie Jr.
- Starring: James Garner; Kim Coates; Marlee Matlin; Lolita Davidovich
- Composer: Jonathan Goldsmith
- Countries of origin: Canada; United States
- Original languages: English; American Sign Language

Production
- Executive producers: John Fremes; Scott Kroopf; Adam Leipzig
- Producer: John Kemeny
- Cinematography: Thomas Burstyn
- Editor: Ronald Sanders
- Running time: 99 minutes
- Production companies: Alliance Communications; Interscope Communications

Original release
- Network: HBO
- Release: January 11, 1997

Dead Silence is a 1997 Canadian-American crime thriller television film directed by Daniel Petrie Jr. and written by Donald E. Stewart, based on the 1995 novel A Maiden's Grave by Jeffery Deaver. The film stars James Garner, Kim Coates, Marlee Matlin, and Lolita Davidovich.

== Premise ==
A veteran FBI agent negotiates the release of a bus load of hard of hearing school children taken hostage by three desperate escaped convicts. After an auto accident that attracted police attention, the criminals hijacked the bus and took refuge in an abandoned slaughterhouse. Agent Potter's last assignment resulted in partial failure and a Congressional hearing that stained his reputation. Potter has trouble keeping local authorities from taking the trigger-happy approach.

Background checks reveal one of the criminals was involved in a robbery where over two million dollars has yet to be recovered. Another is a suspected child rapist who his fellow criminals have trouble keeping under control. Leader Ted Handy eventually shoots him and leaves him to bleed to death. He also executes the female bus driver to prove he is "serious". Melaine Charro, the deaf teacher of the children, finds a broken window where she is occasionally able to sign-language information to the authorities. Handy has doused the main floor in gasoline and threatens to set the building on fire just for "fun".

A basement tunnel opens up onto river bank and Charro manages to sneak herself and the children to this exit point; and authorities are waiting in small rubber boats. The criminals recapture Charro and one other child, but five children escape after a dangerous water ride. The FBI has been a "success" as far as the public is concerned; but the criminals demand a helicopter that Potter is adamant they shouldn't get. He stalls them by saying there is no place a copter could safely land.

With the siege approaching the 24 hour mark, detective Sharon Foster, who has had previous experience with Handy, arrives to lend assistance. She talks Handy and his accomplice into surrendering and all seems well. She offers to ride with the prison van taking Handy back to maximum security. But a dead body is discovered in a washroom at the Niagara Falls airport, the real detective Foster. The imposter was an accomplice of Handy in the two million dollar robbery. By the time authorities arrive, the two prison van guards are dead and Handy is free again. One of the guards did manage to shoot the second criminal dead.

Potter suddenly realizes that the slaughterhouse may not have been a casual choice. Doubling back there, he discovers Handy and the girl taking the two million dollars out of the duct pipes aided by a crooked local politician who had planned the job. In a blaze of gunfire and double-crossing, everyone ends up dead except agent Potter. Charro, who had insisted on coming along, trapped Handy by setting off the gasoline.

== Release ==
Dead Silence premiered on HBO during January 1997. That year the film was also released on VHS in Australia, the UK and several other countries.

A few months after its HBO premiere, the film was screened at the 1997 edition of the Cannes Film Festival, despite being a made for TV production. It also received a theatrical release in Japan.

It was released on DVD in the USA in 2005, and in 2007 in Australia.

== Reception ==
In their June 1997 review, Variety labelled it "strictly for undemanding thriller fans", and commented that, "For most of its length, Dead Silence is a routine hostage drama, though a couple of plot twists in the final reel, while implausible, enliven the hitherto mundane fodder."

== Cast ==
- James Garner as FBI Special Agent John Potter
- Kim Coates as Ted Handy (Note: The character is a reference to serial killer Ted Bundy)
- Marlee Matlin as Melanie Charrol
- Lolita Davidovich as Priss Gunder / Detective Sharon Foster
- Charles Martin Smith as Roland W. Marks
- Kenneth Welsh as Sheriff Lenny Budd
- James Villemaire as Ray "Sonny" Bonner
- Gary Basaraba as Shephard "Shep" Wilcox
- Barclay Hope as Sheriff Gene Stillwell
- Vanessa Vaughan as Susan
- Blu Mankuma as FBI Special Agent Henry Lebow
- Mimi Kuzyk as Donna Harkstrawn
- Scott Speedman as Officer Stevie Cardy
- John Bourgeois as Major Daniel Tremaine
- Neil Crone as Airport Security Officer
- Sharon Dunn as TV News Narrator
- Craig Eldridge as Roger Elb
- Adrian Hough as FBI Agent Pete Henderson
- Ted Whittall as Toby Geller
- Justin Dressler as Sam
- Kristin Dressler as Annie
- Lisa Dressler as Jocelyn
- Christy Elliott as Beverly
- Trista Langford as Emily
- Vance Youngs as Kevin

== Awards and nominations ==
| Year | Award | Category | Nominee(s) | Result |
|---|---|---|---|---|
| 1998 | 12th Gemini Awards | Best Performance by an Actor in a Dramatic Program or Mini-Series | Kim Coates | Nominated |
| 1998 | 12th Gemini Awards | Best Picture Editing in a Dramatic Program or Series | Ronald Sanders | Nominated |
| 1998 | 12th Gemini Awards | Best Sound in a Dramatic Program or Series | David Evans; Lou Solakofski; Orest Sushko; Dan Latour; Tony Currie; David Rose; Steve Baine; David Yonson; John Douglas Smith; Clive Turner | Nominated |
| 1998 | 12th Gemini Awards | Best Original Music Score for a Program or Mini-Series | Jonathan Goldsmith | Won |

== See also ==
- List of films featuring the deaf and hard of hearing
