= Joyce Schure =

Canadian costume designer

Joyce Schure is a Canadian costume designer. She was nominated in the 28th Genie Awards for Best Achievement in Costume Design for her work on the film Shake Hands with the Devil (2007). She is also known for her costume design work on films such as Zero Patience (1993), and television series such as The New Addams Family and Titans.

== Career ==
=== Awards & recognition ===
- 2008 Genie Award for Best Achievement in Costume Design - Shake Hands with the Devil - Nominated
- 1992 Gemini Award for Best Costume Design - Battle of the Bulge - Nominated
- 2023 CAFTCAD Awards for Best Costume Design in TV Sci-Fi/ Fantasy - Titans - Nominated

== Selected filmography ==
=== Television ===
- Beacon 23 (2023—2024)
- Titans (2018—2021)
- The Boys (2019)
- 12 Monkeys (2016—2018)
- Incorporated (2016—2017)
- Almost Heroes (2011)
- G-Spot (2006—2009)
- MVP: The Secret Lives of Hockey Wives (2008)
- Billable Hours (2006—2008)
- Caitlin's Way (2000—2002)
- The New Addams Family (1998—1999)
- Goosebumps (1995—1998)
- Breaker High (1997—1998)

=== Film ===
- Corner Gas: The Movie (2014)
- Magic Flute Diaries (2008)
- Shake Hands with the Devil (2007)
- The Road to Christmas (2006; TV movie)
- Cake (2005)
- Snow (2004; TV movie)
- Cavedweller (2004)
- Crown Heights (2004; TV movie)
- Touch of Pink (2004)
- Thoughtcrimes (2003; TV movie)
- Spinning Boris (2003; TV movie)
- Ice Bound (2003; TV movie)
- Jasper, Texas (2003; TV movie)
- 10,000 Black Men Named George (2002; TV movie)
- The Other Me (2000; TV movie)
- Salt Water Moose (1996)
- Iron Eagle on the Attack (1995)
- No Contest (1995)
- Zero Patience (1993)
- The Swordsman (1992)
