= Mark Zsifkovits =

Production sound mixer

Mark Zsifkovits is a production sound mixer. He is a joint winner of a Genie Award for Best Achievement in Overall Sound for his work in the 2007 David Cronenberg gangster film Eastern Promises.

== Recognition ==
- 2008 Genie Award for Best Achievement in Overall Sound – Eastern Promises – Nominee (shared with Stuart Wilson, Christian Cooke, Orest Sushko).
- 2005 Gemini Award for Best Sound in a Dramatic Program – Lives of the Saints – Won (shared with John Laing, Todd Beckett, Rob Bertola, Keith Elliott, Mark Gingras, Tim O'Connell, Jill Purdy, John J. Thomson)
- 2003 Genie Award for Best Achievement in Overall Sound – Between Strangers – Won (shared with Thomas Hidderley, Todd Beckett, Keith Elliott)
