= Resident Evil: Afterlife =

2010 film by Paul W. S. Anderson

- Theatrical release poster
- Directed by: Paul W. S. Anderson
- Written by: Paul W. S. Anderson
- Based on: Resident Evil by Capcom
- Produced by: Jeremy Bolt; Paul W. S. Anderson; Robert Kulzer; Don Carmody; Bernd Eichinger; Samuel Hadida
- Starring: Milla Jovovich; Ali Larter; Kim Coates; Shawn Roberts; Sergio Peris-Mencheta; Spencer Locke; Boris Kodjoe; Wentworth Miller
- Cinematography: Glen MacPherson
- Edited by: Niven Howie
- Music by: Tomandandy
- Production companies: Constantin Film; Davis Films; Impact Pictures
- Distributed by: Screen Gems (United States, Canada and United Kingdom; through Sony Pictures Releasing); Constantin Film Verleih (Germany); Metropolitan Filmexport (France)
- Release dates: September 2, 2010 (Tokyo); September 10, 2010 (United States)
- Running time: 97 minutes
- Countries: United States; Germany; Canada; France; United Kingdom
- Language: English
- Budget: $60 million
- Box office: $300.2 million

Resident Evil: Afterlife is a 2010 action horror film written and directed by Paul W. S. Anderson. It is the second film in the series that he directed, after the first film. A direct sequel to Resident Evil: Extinction (2007), it is the fourth installment in the Resident Evil film series, which is loosely based on the video game series of the same name, and the first to be shot in 3D. It stars Milla Jovovich, Ali Larter, Kim Coates, Shawn Roberts, Spencer Locke, Boris Kodjoe and Wentworth Miller.

The film follows Alice (Jovovich), a superpowered human who battles her former employer, the sinister Umbrella Corporation, following the outbreak of a T-virus, which has turned most of the Earth's inhabitants into zombies. After attacking Albert Wesker (Roberts), the head of Umbrella, Alice is robbed of her superhuman abilities and must ally herself with other survivors in order to find a rumored sanctuary.

In May 2005, producers mentioned the possibility of following Extinction with a sequel titled Afterlife. Extinction was released in 2007 and was a box office success, prompting Afterlife to begin development in June 2008, with the script being written by Anderson that December. Chris Redfield, a primary character from the video games, was featured for the first time in the film franchise, alongside returning characters Claire Redfield, Wesker, and Jill Valentine. Elements from the video game Resident Evil 5 (2009), including mind-controlling P30 devices, Chris's confrontation with Wesker, and a brainwashed Valentine were adapted for the film. Filming took place in Toronto from September to December 2009 using the 3D Fusion Camera System.

The film was released on September 10, 2010, to generally negative reviews. The film grossed $60 million in the United States and Canada on an estimated $60 million budget, and made $240 million in other markets surpassing the previous film's overseas total in the second week of release. Grossing a worldwide total of $300 million, Resident Evil: Afterlife became the second-highest-grossing entry of the series. Resident Evil: Afterlife was released to DVD, Blu-ray and Blu-ray 3D on December 28, 2010, in the United States. A fifth film, Resident Evil: Retribution, was released in 2012.

== Plot ==
Alice and her clones infiltrate Umbrella HQ in Tokyo, (Note: As foreshadowed at the end of Resident Evil: Extinction.) slaying the entire branch except for Albert Wesker, who escapes in a tiltrotor plane and detonates a bomb that leaves a massive sinkhole. The real Alice, having boarded beforehand, attempts to execute Wesker, only for him to inject her with an anti-virus, removing her superhuman powers. Wesker reveals that he used the T-virus to gain his own abilities. He prepares to kill Alice, but the plane crashes into the mountains. Alice survives and flees.

Six months later, Alice travels to Alaska in an airplane, tracking broadcasts from a safe haven called Arcadia; she only finds a field of abandoned planes where she is attacked by a feral Claire Redfield. Alice destroys a scarab-like device on Claire's chest, giving her amnesia and pacifying her. They fly to Los Angeles and discover survivors living in a prison surrounded by thousands of undead. Luther West leads the group, consisting of Wendell, Crystal, Bennett, Yong, and Angel. With their help, Alice and Claire land on the prison's roof. Luther explains that Arcadia is actually a cargo tanker traveling along the coast. However, the ship has ceased movement and its crew is unresponsive to the group's rescue flares. Luther takes Alice to a caged man, Chris, who he believes is the prison's last inmate. Chris protests his innocence and promises to reveal an escape route if released. Alice goes to shower and catches Wendell peeping. They are attacked by a group of zombies who have tunneled into the prison. The infected kill Wendell; Alice wards them off.

Desperate, the survivors free Chris, who jogs Claire's memory by revealing they are siblings. Chris tells the group about an armored car in the prison, hoping to escape in it. However, a giant axe-wielding monster dubbed "the Axeman" begins attacking the front gate. Alice, Chris, and Crystal go to the basement armory to retrieve firearms, but zombies kill Crystal. Inspecting the armored car, Angel finds its engine is missing, rendering it useless. A hysterical Bennett shoots Angel, steals Alice's plane, and heads for Arcadia. The Axeman breaks down the gate and zombies swarm the prison. Attacking the group, the Axeman bisects Yong and incapacitates Alice. Claire successfully defends Alice and disorients the Axeman; Alice kills it. The survivors use the zombie-dug tunnels to escape into the sewers. However, Luther is dragged into the tunnels by a zombie.

Alice and the Redfields commandeer a boat and board the Arcadia, discovering it functional but abandoned. Claire then remembers Arcadia is an Umbrella trap to obtain test subjects; after her convoy escaped to Alaska, (Note: As depicted in Resident Evil: Extinction.) they were captured by its crew and incapacitated using scarab devices. Claire managed to escape, but was still affected by the device. They discover the imprisoned, comatose survivors, including K-Mart, and free them. Alice follows a trail of blood deeper into the ship, where she finds Wesker. The T-virus revived him after their crash but now constantly battles Wesker for control, something he believes fresh human DNA can pacify; the Umbrella staff fled when he began eating test subjects. Wesker believes consuming Alice will help him regain control of his body, as she bonded with the T-virus on a cellular level and still retained control.

The Redfields fight Wesker while Alice battles Bennett, now Wesker's employee. Wesker easily overpowers Chris and Claire, but Alice successfully subdues both Bennett and Wesker with help from K-Mart. They lock Bennett in with Wesker, who devours him. Wesker escapes in an aircraft, activating a bomb on the Arcadia; his plane explodes instead, as Alice stowed the bomb aboard it beforehand. Wesker parachutes away from the explosion, while Luther emerges from the sewers, battered but alive. Alice, unaware of Wesker's survival, resolves to turn Arcadia into a real haven and broadcasts a new message for remaining survivors, but her victory is short-lived. As Alice, Claire, and Chris watch from Arcadia, a vast squadron of Umbrella aircraft approaches. Jill Valentine, who went missing after the destruction of Raccoon City, (Note: As depicted in Resident Evil: Apocalypse.) is dictating the attack from one of the aircraft. A scarab device is attached to her chest.

== Cast ==
- Milla Jovovich as Alice, a former Umbrella Corporation security officer turned rogue fighter
- Ali Larter as Claire Redfield, one of Alice's former allies who escaped to Alaska
- Kim Coates as Bennett, a former film producer and one of the Los Angeles survivors
- Shawn Roberts as Albert Wesker, the Chairman of the Umbrella Corporation who possesses superhuman strength, speed, and regenerative capabilities
- Sergio Peris-Mencheta as Angel, a survivor and mechanic in Los Angeles
- Spencer Locke as K-Mart, a young girl named after the department store where she was discovered hiding
- Boris Kodjoe as Luther, a former professional basketball player who leads the band of Los Angeles survivors
- Wentworth Miller as Chris Redfield, a United States military elite soldier and Claire’s older brother
- Sienna Guillory as Jill Valentine, a former S.T.A.R.S. member and Raccoon City police officer
- Kacey Barnfield as Crystal Waters, a junior swimming champion in her high school days
- Norman Yeung as Kim Yong, Bennett's intern before the virus outbreak
- Fulvio Cecere as Wendell, a survivor in Los Angeles
- Ray Olubowale as Axeman, an axe-wielding creature
- Mika Nakashima as J-Pop Girl, Japan's patient zero

== Production ==
=== Development ===
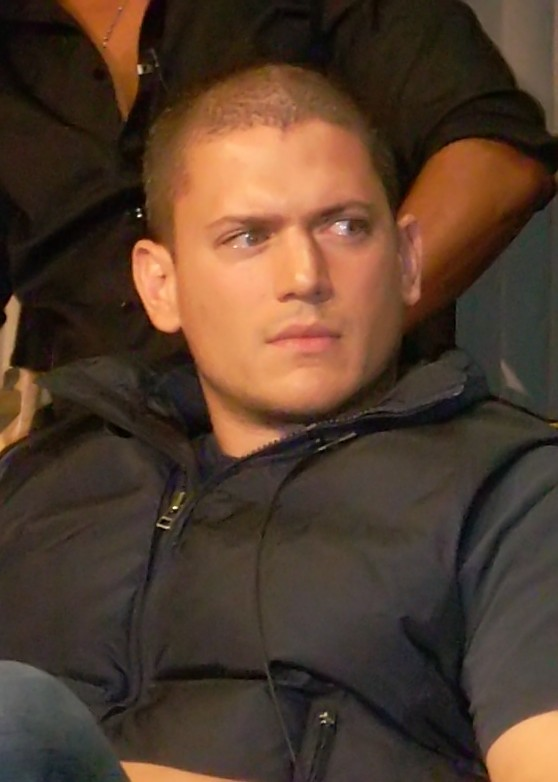
When Miller first read the script he thought the association to Prison Break was a practical joke with his imprisonment and his first line being, "I know a way out of here."

In May 2005, producers mentioned the possibility of following Extinction with a sequel entitled Afterlife, to be shot and set in Tokyo, Japan and Alaska. Despite Resident Evil: Extinction being billed on the official website and elsewhere as the final installment of the Resident Evil film series; on September 23, 2007, Rory Bruer, Sony's head of distribution explained, "It absolutely would not surprise me considering the success of the franchise that they find a way to come up with another. It's a real possibility." Producer Jeremy Bolt also stated that while there was no intention of making a fourth film, that the third had been particularly well done and that Paul Anderson was talking with Sony about the possibility. In June 2008, Anderson noted that negotiations were underway with Sony for creating the film. In December 2008, Anderson stated that he was working on the script. The following year, it was announced that Sony was aiming to release Resident Evil: Afterlife by August 27, 2010.

=== Casting ===
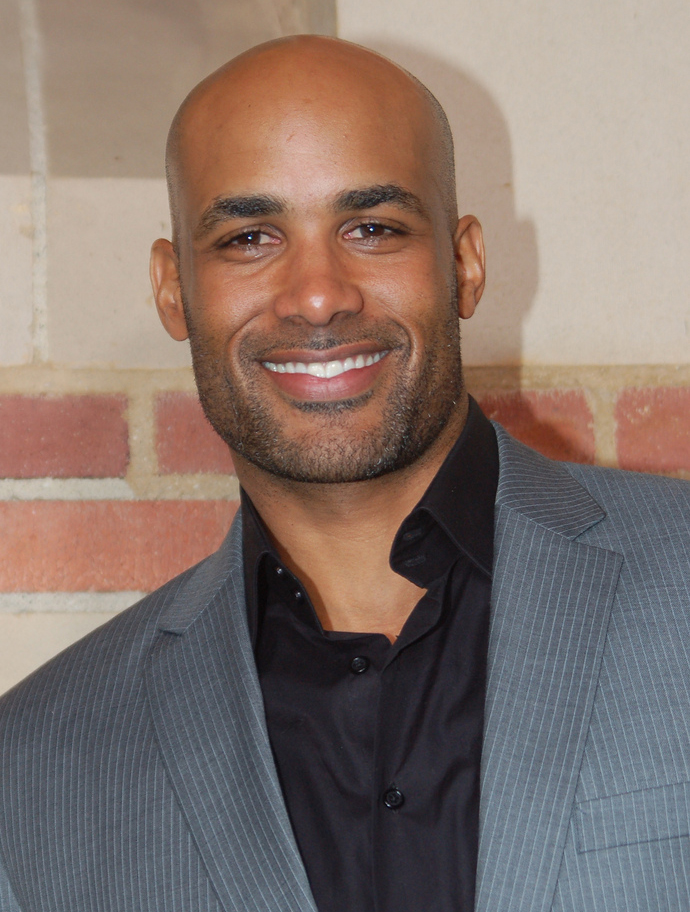
Boris Kodjoe trained for six weeks to perform his own stunts. He dislocated his knee in the course of filming while trying to kick in a gate.

In September 2006, reports indicated that casting for the fourth film had begun, with Jensen Ackles being considered for the role of Leon S. Kennedy. Ali Larter missed seven episodes of filming the television show Heroes in order to appear in the film. Before Wentworth Miller was cast as Chris Redfield, actor Johnny Messner auditioned for the role. Having never played the Resident Evil video games, Miller began preparing for the role by searching the internet for images of Chris Redfield. Much to his surprise, he noticed how muscular the character was; with only three weeks to prep before shooting, he knew it was impossible to increase his muscle mass to that extent. He was shown video footage of the games and saw how he was visually different, especially in the first game. He did cardio to build up endurance. Miller described his interpretation on the character from the video game as: "He's definitely capable and heroic, but there's also something quite innocent. He was still freshly scrubbed, in a way, at the beginning of this horrifying journey." He described his take as the character in the film: "My Chris has been walking down this particular road for quite some time. The edges are sharper, and they're way more jagged."

Shawn Roberts was originally going to audition for Chris Redfield before Miller accepted the role. He went to audition for the role of Albert Wesker, a role previously played by Jason O'Mara. Describing the character Roberts said: "[He's the] Chairman of the Umbrella Corporation. He is in a position of power. He pretty much runs the world, and Alice is an annoyance. It's a whole process: I get to set and wardrobe gives me this big, long black jacket, and props comes over and gives me the dark glasses and the gloves. By the time you are all dressed you stand a little straighter, you walk a little differently. He's got everything going for him—he's super fast, super strong, has the ability to regenerate—it's all the elements from the game. That was one thing we all agreed on from the start: this character has to be for the fans." Sienna Guillory reprises her role as Jill Valentine, who was last seen in Resident Evil: Apocalypse. She is featured briefly in a scene shown during the credits, setting up the sequel.

=== Cinematography and set design ===
Anderson was shown footage of James Cameron's Avatar, which sold him on the idea to shoot Resident Evil: Afterlife in digital 3D. He shot in high-definition with an aspect ratio of 2.35:1, using Cameron's Fusion Camera System, or more specifically a Sony F35 camera. The crew spent two weeks in pre-production learning the 3D camera system. With a budget of about $60 million, principal photography took place for 55 days, from September 29 to December 2009. Filming in 3D added 20% to the budget. Roberts began filming his scenes on October 10, 2009. The final showdown scene was filmed for about six days. During production, Jovovich accidentally shot out a $100,000 camera.

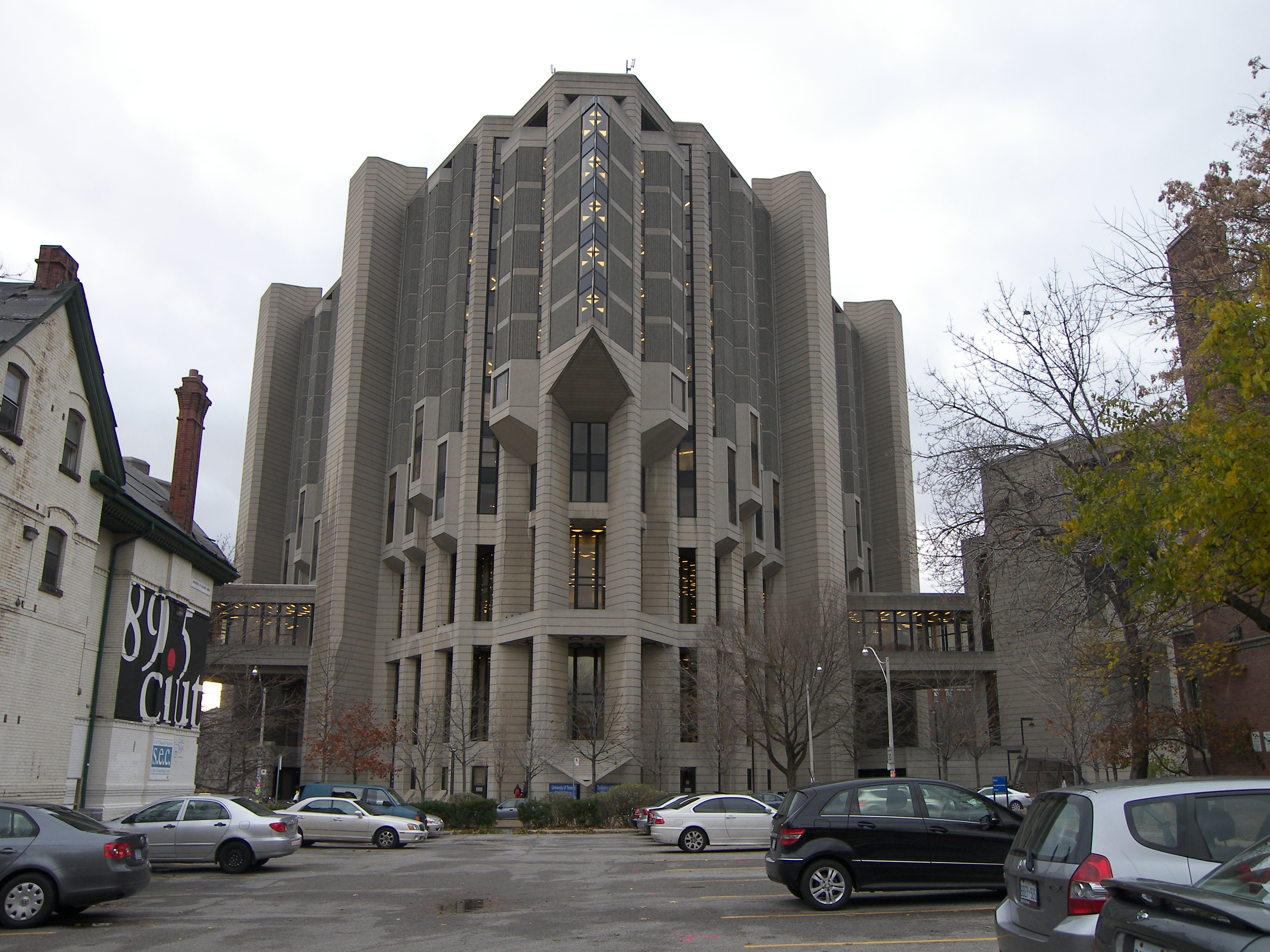
Robarts Library's exterior was used to portray the prison.

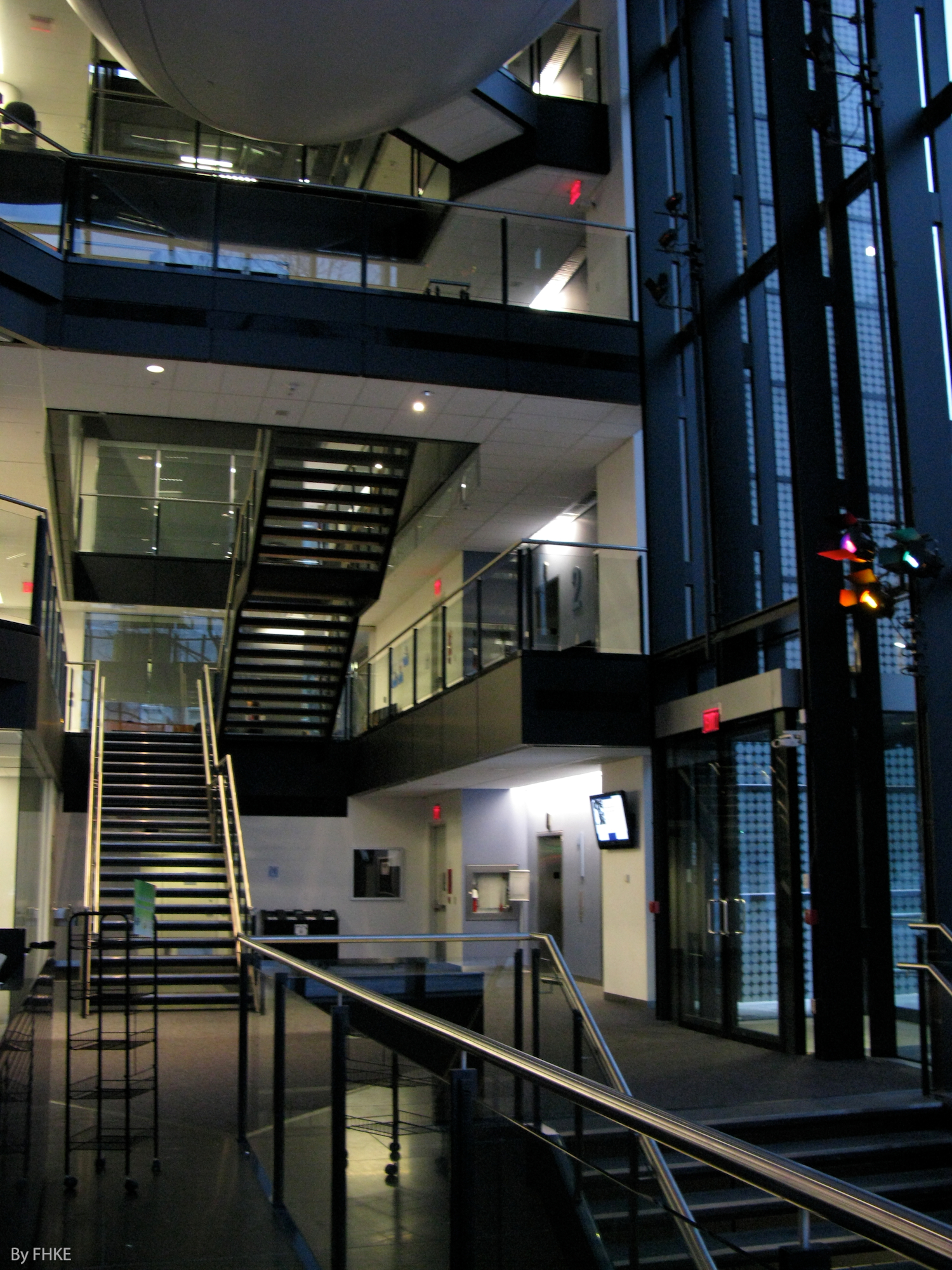
Leslie Dan Faculty of Pharmacy was used to portray Umbrella Corporation's underground Tokyo headquarters. Anderson said: "It had a fantastic atrium that had these huge floating pill shapes in it. Inside the pills were conference rooms. We shot at night so there was no ambient light coming into the glass, and then with visual effects replaced the glass with concrete walls".

For slow motion scenes with bullets and drops of water, twin Phantom high-speed cameras were used which filmed 200 frames per second. A fight scene with Wesker and Chris in the Resident Evil 5 game was recreated shot-by-shot for the film, and the Phantom cameras were used to create Wesker's superhuman speed which took about two days to film. The added size and weight of the 3D cameras meant the filmmakers were not able to use existing equipment such as Steadicam rigs. Instead, the camera operator worked on a Segway to achieve the look of a Steadicam shot. Much of the action scenes were shot in front of a green screen. A 1983 Yak-52 was used throughout the film by Jovovich and Larter. Stunt pilot Martin Mattes was dressed like Jovovich and flew the plane for the camera.

The 3D cameras were unable to pick up anything shiny, such as stainless steel, due to a flare. Set decorator Cal Loucks said that most items that looked metal were actually painted silver with special paint to remove its reflective quality. The saturation of colors also had to be changed to accustom the 3D cameras, which are "slow to pick up information". Loucks said: "It's a very restrictive color palette. For example, in this warehouse scene, we saturated the floors in a dark, dark charcoal, and we thought that was enough, but then the cameras showed them as still being too light. So we had to add more and more black. The reason I say it's too light is because we are putting more light onto these sets than we ever have before."

=== Filming locations ===
Principal photography was done mostly at Cinespace Film Studios in Toronto, Ontario. Toronto police received hundreds of calls from concerned neighbors after a scene involving a burning plane crashed. For the underwater scenes, cargo shipping containers were cut and welded to make a giant tank on stage. The opening scene was filmed at Cinespace Film Studios. Interior scenes of Umbrella Corporation's subterranean lair were filmed at the Leslie Dan Faculty of Pharmacy. Robarts Library was used to portray exterior shots of a Los Angeles prison, due to its resemblance to a prison, and other scenes were shot at University of Toronto Scarborough. Scenes portraying an Alaskan aircraft boneyard were filmed at Oshawa Airport. A location depicting an Alaskan beach was filmed at Sandbanks Provincial Park. Second unit was sent to Alaska to capture establishing shots of the scenery.

=== Visual and special effects ===
Visual effects were done by Rocket Science VFX and Mr. X Inc. Paul Jones served as the special effects creator, who previously designed the Nemesis character in Resident Evil: Apocalypse. The production team planned to use extras to portray 300 zombies at once, but time restraints prevented that. Around 150 zombies were eventually used, and Mr. X Inc's visual effects supervisor, Dennis Berardi, added more in post-production. For Alice's clones, they shot motion control photography for multiple passes of Jovovich. For the wide shots, they took digital photo doubles. Visual effects production manager Eric Robertson described the look of the film: "interesting contrasts, pure whites, which is a staggering look. It's so clean and tight along with some real darkness too that may evoke a bit of a feel of Silent Hill. So we've got the extremes, but it's definitely a unique look for this incarnation and it's been fun to see those looks." A burned cityscape with ash and smoke in the sky was created to depict a postapocalyptic Los Angeles, in which most of the film is set. Bolt described this approach as: "In a world that has gone to hell in a handbasket, there's no control and no fire service, so clearly, what's going to happen to LA is it's going to get burned."

The infected Dobermans from the games and previous films return, but are more advanced. The dogs wore a costume with prosthetics. Anderson wanted to make the dogs in this film look "absolutely terrible". Computer effects were used to make the dog's jaw flare open, with tentacles coming out of their mouths, similar to the dogs from the fourth and fifth video games. Other creatures borrowed from the fifth video game are the "Majini", who are more intelligent and have mandibles and tentacles coming out of their mouths, and "The Executioner" (named the Axeman in the film).

== Release ==
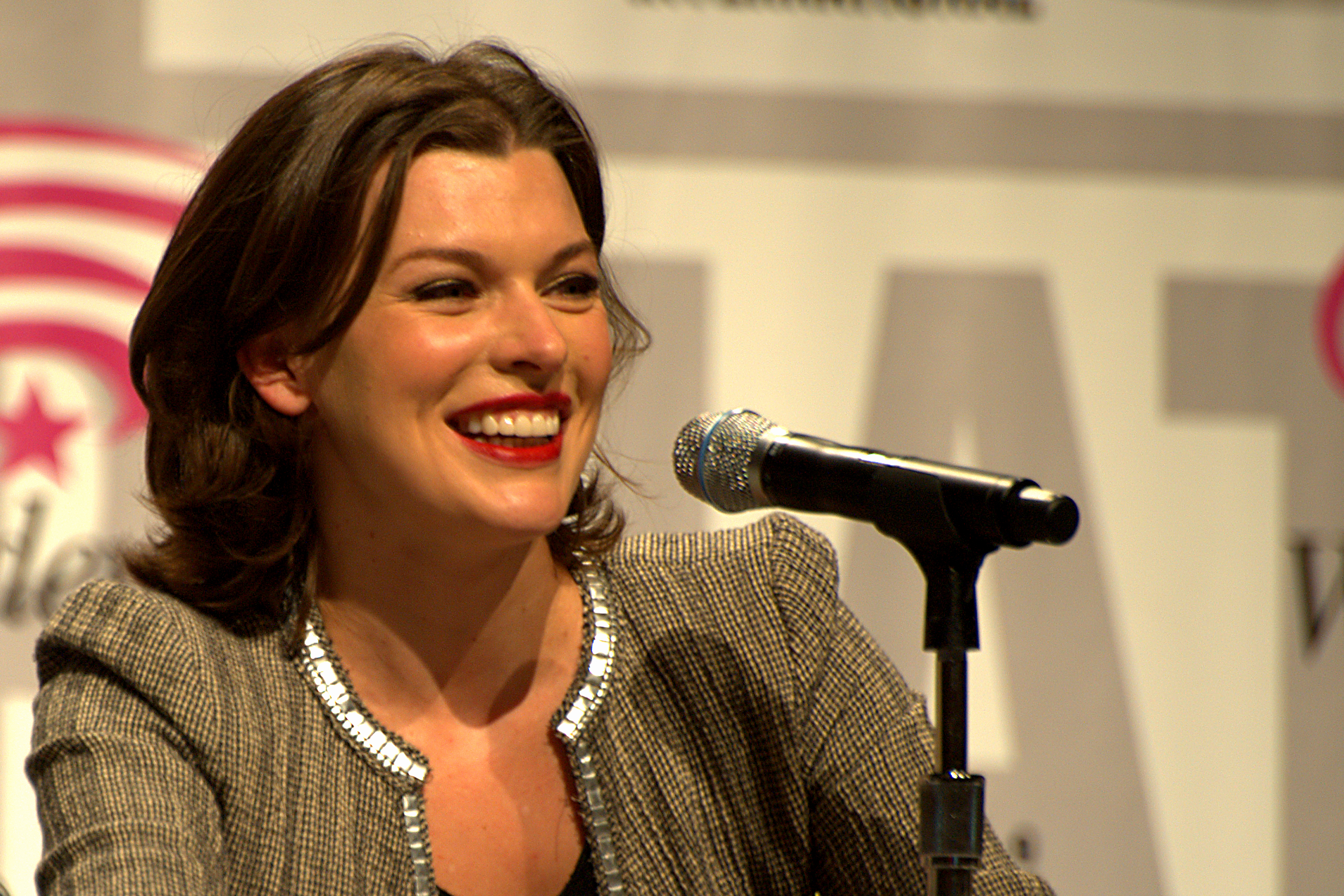
Milla Jovovich speaking at WonderCon 2010 about the film

In August 2009, it was announced that the film would be released on August 27, 2010, but that December it was set back to January 14, 2011. In January 2010, it was announced that the release date was moved to September 10, 2010. Screen Gems paid Constantin Film, Davis Films and Impact Pictures $52 million for the rights to distribute the film in North American and "most key foreign markets".

On April 3, 2010, Anderson, Jovovich and Larter attended WonderCon for a Resident Evil: Afterlife, panel answering fan questions. On July 24, 2010, they attended San Diego Comic-Con to promote the film.

=== Soundtrack ===
The Resident Evil: Afterlife: Music from the Motion Picture was composed by Tomandandy and released on September 28, 2010, by Milan Records.

No.	Title	Length
1.	"Tokyo"	4:32
2.	"Umbrella"	1:20
3.	"Damage"	1:02
4.	"Cutting"	1:12
5.	"Twins"	1:47
6.	"Exit"	0:47
7.	"Far"	1:07
8.	"Flying"	1:58
9.	"Memory"	3:17
10.	"Los Angeles"	2:09
11.	"Binoculars"	2:53
12.	"Prison"	1:58
13.	"Discovery"	1:10
14.	"Hatchet"	1:23
15.	"AxeMan"	3:07
16.	"Arcadia"	4:21
17.	"Up"	1:39
18.	"Party"	0:54
19.	"Promise"	2:12
20.	"Resident Evil Suite"	4:33
21.	"Rooftop" (deluxe edition exclusive)	1:58
22.	"Tokyo (CruciA Remix)" (deluxe edition exclusive)	3:12
23.	"Tokyo (Phil Jelley Remix)" (deluxe edition exclusive)	3:17
24.	"AxeMan (Hani Remix)" (deluxe edition exclusive)	3:12
25.	"AxeMan (Poll a Rock Remix)" (deluxe edition exclusive)	4:31
Total length:		43:21

In addition to the original soundtrack, "The Outsider" (Apocalypse Remix) by alternative rock group A Perfect Circle was used for the marketing of the film, along with a short segment of it being played during the confrontation between Alice and Wesker, as well as playing over the end credits.

=== Home media ===
Resident Evil: Afterlife was released to DVD, Blu-ray and Blu-ray 3D on December 28, 2010 in the United States. Special features on the DVD includes a filmmaker commentary and two featurettes. The Blu-ray releases includes the same and also with deleted and extended scenes, additional featurettes and outtakes. An Ultra HD Blu-ray edition was released on January 17, 2017.

In 2013, Sony Pictures Home Entertainment released a two-disc set containing the first four films in the series. It was called 'The 4 Movie Resident Evil Collection'.

== Box office ==
=== United States and Canada ===
Resident Evil: Afterlife opened on approximately 4,700 screens in 3,203 locations, with 2,062 of the locations showing on 3D-equipped screens and 141 in IMAX 3D, ranking as one of the widest 3D releases at the time. In Canada, the film opened in an additional 250 theaters through Alliance Films. The film opened at number one and took in $10.7 million on its opening day and $26.6 million on its opening weekend. By its second weekend, the film had dropped to fourth place, with the newly released The Town taking its first place spot. It grossed $10 million, a 63% decrease in ticket sales from its opening weekend. It fell to seventh place by its third weekend, grossing $4.9 million and was removed from 567 theaters. On its fourth weekend, Resident Evil: Afterlife moved to eleventh place, with the newly released Case 39 at number one, while grossing $2.7 million and being dropped from 735 theaters. For the film's fifth weekend, it made $1.2 million, a 54% decrease from the previous weekend, and was removed from an additional 895 theaters. For its sixth, seventh and eight weekends, it had dropped to $347,264, $137,502 and $70,474, respectively, and was playing in 140 theaters by its eight and final weekend. The film left theaters on November 4, 2010, after 56 days of release.

=== Other countries ===
On September 15, Resident Evil: Afterlife opened in 30 countries, bumping Inception from first place and grossing $42.3 million from 3,559 screens with 3D screenings accounting for 81% of total earnings, thereby becoming the most successful overseas debut of the entire series. More than one-third of the total came from a $15.5 million three-day launch in Japan. Additionally, the film grossed $6.4 million in Russia, $3.3 million in Spain, $2.95 million in Taiwan and $2.6 million in the UK. By September 19, it had passed Resident Evil: Extinction's $97.1 million overseas total. The following day, it had surpassed Extinction's total of $103.2 million overseas, 148.8 million worldwide, to become the highest-grossing entry of the series.

During its second week, the film grossed $40 million, with $5.3 million of it in Germany, $3.2 million in Mexico, $3.1 million in South Korea and $2.9 million in Brazil. Japanese ticket sales grossed $5.1 million, with Russia adding another $4.2 million. By its third weekend, it was still at number one, grossing $24.3 million, with an opening in France adding $3.5 million. Hong Kong added another $768,324. The film remained at #1 for its fourth weekend, grossing $15.6 million. On its fifth weekend, it grossed $8 million, dropping to fifth place, being replaced by Eat Pray Love at number one. By its eleventh weekend, ticket sales had dropped to $9.1 million gross, with a full $9 million of that coming from its opening in China. Overall, Resident Evil: Afterlife only missed by about $1.5 million the total the three previous films in the series had made combined.

=== Worldwide overview ===
The film grossed $60 million in the US and Canada with $240 million in other markets, for a worldwide total of $300 million. In the United States, the high box-office gross was attributed to the ticket price inflation of the 3D presentation, but the film had the lowest opening-weekend attendance of the film series. On November 23, 2010, Resident Evil: Afterlife became the most successful production in Canadian feature film history, as well as the highest-grossing zombie film. It is also the highest-grossing film to be released by Screen Gems. Worldwide, it is the fourth-highest-grossing video game film of all time, behind Warcraft ($433.5 million), The Angry Birds Movie ($347.1 million) and Prince of Persia: The Sands of Time ($336.4 million).

== Reception ==
=== Critical response ===
Resident Evil: Afterlife was not screened in advance for critics. Review aggregator Rotten Tomatoes gives the film a score of 21% based on reviews from 107 critics, with an average rating of 4.1/10. The site's consensus states: "As dim-witted and lifeless as its undead antagonists, Resident Evil: Afterlife is a wholly unnecessary addition to the franchise." On Metacritic, which assigns a weighted average score out of 100 to reviews from mainstream critics, the film received an average score of 37 based on 14 reviews, indicating "generally unfavorable reviews". CinemaScore polls reported that the average grade moviegoers gave the film was a "B−" on an A+ to F scale.

Michael Ordoña of the Los Angeles Times gave it a positive review, noting the slower cut of the film and saying: "the action is easier to read than in most films of the genre, and therefore more enjoyable. Anderson makes particular use of sets and locations to wring out more bang for the stereoscopic buck". Phelim O'Neill of The Guardian gave the film two stars out of five praising the use of 3D, while stating that the Resident Evil films "always look good and have well-staged action, but they don't have one iota of originality or imagination". Chicago Reader's Andrea Gronvall described the plot as "nearly indiscernible", but did call the film the "sleekest so far, thanks to 3D and star Milla Jovovich's body-hugging catsuit".

Jeannette Catsoulis of The New York Times gave the film a negative review, saying: "Cannibalizing John Carpenter's Thing and much of the sci-fi-horror canon, Afterlife is more moribund than its thronging undead". David Edwards of the Daily Mirror compared it to Resident Evil: Extinction, stating that the "results are even less impressive, which is saying quite something" and "only fans of the series will care with the film looking suspiciously like a series of barely connected action scenes and unimpressive 3D welded to a who-the-hell-cares? plot". Spill.com critics Korey Coleman and Co-Host 3000 gave the film a "Some Ol' Bullshit", the second-lowest rating on the site. They criticized the overuse of slow motion, lack of explanation of certain plot elements and long lapses in between action, but gave the film points for its cinematography, small bits of action, 3D and the special effects of the Axeman. Andrew Barker of Variety compared the film to the previous installment as "equally moribund, and perhaps even more shamelessly derivative". He compared Roberts' Wesker to Hugo Weaving's Agent Smith from The Matrix, calling it a "slipshod impression". A particularly scathing review came from Brian Orndorf of Dark Horizons, who commented: "Perhaps the first 3D motion picture to simulate the experience of watching paint dry, Resident Evil: Afterlife is a dreadful bore that only occasionally comes to life."

=== Accolades ===
List of Awards
Award	Category	Recipients	Result
People's Choice Awards	Favorite Horror Movie	Resident Evil: Afterlife	Nominated
Genie Awards	Best Achievement in Art Direction/Production Design	Resident Evil: Afterlife; Arv Greywal	Nominated
Genie Awards	Best Achievement in Costume Design	Resident Evil: Afterlife; Denise Cronenberg	Nominated
Genie Awards	Best Achievement in Make-Up	Resident Evil: Afterlife; Paul Jones, Leslie Sebert, Vincent Sullivan	Nominated
Genie Awards	Best Achievement in Overall Sound	Resident Evil: Afterlife; Mark Zsifkovits	Nominated
Genie Awards	Best Achievement in Sound Editing	Resident Evil: Afterlife; Stephen Barden, Steve Baine, Kevin Banks, Alex Bullick, Jill Purdy	Nominated
Genie Awards	Golden Reel Award	Resident Evil: Afterlife	Won
Scream Awards	Best Science Fiction Actress	Milla Jovovich	Won

== See also ==
- List of films based on video games
