= Citizen Duane =

- Directed by: Michael Mabbott
- Written by: Robert DeLeskie; Jonathan Sobol
- Produced by: Carolynne Bell; Susan Cavan
- Starring: Douglas Smith; Vivica A. Fox; Nicholas Carella; Alberta Watson; Jessica Holmes; Donal Logue
- Cinematography: Adam Swica
- Edited by: Mike Munn; James Bredin
- Music by: Mike Shields
- Distributed by: THINKFilm (Canada); Shoreline Entertainment (worldwide)
- Release date: November 2, 2006
- Running time: 85 minutes
- Country: Canada
- Language: English

Citizen Duane is a 2006 Canadian comedy film.

== Plot ==
Duane Balfour was born into a family of misfortune, in the prairie town of Ridgeburg. After losing a high school election against his enemy Chad, he decides to run for mayor against Chad's grandmother—Ridgeburg's Mayor Milton, who has been the incumbent for a ridiculously long time. Duane and a homeless man are the only two competing with Mayor Milton.

Duane has a long-standing resentment against Milton because she approved his father's shooting by the police. His father had become violent while trying, without success, to warn Milton and the townsfolk that the town's namesake ridge would soon collapse due to heavy mining and insect tunneling.

With the support of his brother Maurie, Duane tries, and fails, to win the election. After withdrawing from the race he and his uncle drive back to Duane's house from Ridgeburg's ridge. The camera pans down underground, showing an insect removing a rock from a tunnel under the ridge. This triggers a landslide, leading to the implosion of the ridge, which Duane and his uncle see from the back of their truck. The next morning, prior to the election results being announced, it is revealed Mayor Milton has had a heart attack after seeing the ridge collapse, presumably since she realized that Duane's father was right all along.

Later in the day it is announced that the homeless man has become mayor with three votes, Milton's votes being deemed invalid and Duane having dropped out of the election.

== Cast ==
- Douglas Smith as Duane Balfour
- Devon Bostick as Maurie Balfour
- Jane McGregor as Molly Buckley
- Donal Logue as Uncle Bingo
- Alberta Watson as Bonnie Balfour
- Rosemary Dunsmore as Mayor Kelly Milton
- Vivica A. Fox as Miss Houston
- Kevin Jubinville as Mort McQuillan
- Nicholas Carella as Chad Milton
- Scott Wickware as Mr. McNeil
- Alex Woods as Todd Rico
- Andrew Corry as Cosmo
- Lisa Ng as Julie the Intern
- Daveed Louza as Techie
- Joe Pingue as Vince Vaserelli
- Peter Stebbings as Minister
- Tyler Hynes as Rebel Stoner
- Eric Weinthal as City Clerk
- Richard Waugh as Jim Clapperton
- Jessica Holmes as Kim Vegas

== Recognition ==
- 2008 Genie Award for Best Achievement in Overall Sound - John J. Thomson, Steph Carrier, Martin Lee - Nominee
