= Ronald Sanders (film editor) =

Canadian film editor and television producer

Ronald Sanders is a Canadian film editor and television producer.

== Career ==
Sanders won Genie Awards for his work on Eastern Promises (2007), eXistenZ (2000), Crash (1996), and Dead Ringers (1989). He has collaborated extensively with director David Cronenberg; since 1979, he has edited most of Cronenberg's films.

Ronald Sanders is a member of the Canadian Cinema Editors.

== Filmography ==
=== As editor ===
Year	Title
1979	Fast Company
1979	Title Shot
1981	Scanners
1983	Videodrome
1983	The Dead Zone
1986	The Fly
1988	Dead Ringers
1989	Age-Old Friends
1990	Perfectly Normal
1991	Naked Lunch
1993	M. Butterfly
1995	Johnny Mnemonic
1996	Crash
1997	Keeping the Promise
1997	Dead Silence
1997	Joe Torre: Curveballs Along the Way
1999	eXistenZ
2000	The Golden Spiders: A Nero Wolfe Mystery
2001	Dinner with Friends
2002	Spider
2004	Zeyda and the Hitman
2005	A History of Violence
2007	Eastern Promises
2009	Coraline
2010	The Bang Bang Club
2011	Beat the World
2011	A Dangerous Method
2012	Cosmopolis
2014	Maps to the Stars
2016	Mean Dreams
2018	The Grizzlies
2020	Falling

== Awards and nominations ==
Year	Award	Film	Result	Ref(s)
1982	Genie Award for Best Achievement in Film Editing	Scanners	Nominated	
1984	Genie Award for Best Achievement in Film Editing	Videodrome	Nominated	
1989	Genie Award for Best Achievement in Film Editing	Dead Ringers	Won	
1991	Genie Award for Best Achievement in Film Editing	Perfectly Normal	Nominated	
1996	Genie Award for Best Achievement in Editing	Crash	Won	
1998 (spring)	Gemini Award for Best Picture Editing in a Dramatic Program or Series	Dead Silence	Nominated	
2000	Genie Award for Best Achievement in Editing	eXistenZ	Won	
2003	Directors Guild of Canada DGC Craft Award for Outstanding Achievement in Picture Editing - Long Form	Spider	Nominated	
2003	Directors Guild of Canada DGC Team Award for Outstanding Achievement in a Feature Film	Spider	Won	
2005	San Diego Film Critics Society Awards SDFCS Award for Best Editing	A History of Violence	Won	
2006	Online Film Critics Society Awards OFCS Award for Best Editing	A History of Violence	Nominated	
2006	Directors Guild of Canada DGC Craft Award for Outstanding Picture Editing - Feature Film	A History of Violence	Won	
2007	Satellite Award for Best Film Editing	Eastern Promises	Nominated	
2008	Genie Award for Best Achievement in Editing	Eastern Promises	Won	

== See also ==
- List of film director and editor collaborations
