= Stephan Carrier =

Re-recording mixer

Stephan Carrier is a re-recording mixer. He has worked on a number of films and television series.

In 2005 he created sound mixes for the film Beowulf and Grendel, and in 2008 for the series Flashpoint. In 2012 he was nominated for a Genie Award for excellence in overall sound for the film "The Big Bang Club".

== Recognition ==
- 1999 Genie Award for Best Overall Sound - Such a Long Journey - Nominated (shared with Henry Embry, Lou Solakofski, Orest Sushko)
- 2000 Gemini Award for Best Overall Sound in a Dramatic Program or Series - Amazon - Nominated (shared with Dan Daniels, Jack Heeren)
- 2000 Gemini Award for Best Overall Sound in a Dramatic Program or Series - Amazon - Nominated (shared with Dan Daniels, Jack Heeren)
- 2000 Motion Picture Sound Editors Golden Reel Award for Best Sound Editing - Television Mini-Series - Dialogue and ADR - Joan of Arc - Won (shared with John Douglas Smith (supervising sound editor/supervising dialogue and adr editor), Tom Bjelic (supervising sound editor), Richard Cadger (editor), Tony Currie (sound editor), John Laing (editor), Dale Sheldrake (editor), Phong Tran (editor), Joe Lafontaine (editor), James Robb (assistant adr editor), Allan Fung (assistant adr editor), Jean Claude Fortier (assistant adr editor), Mike Palmer (assistant adr editor), Urmas Rosin (production mixer), Lou Solakofski (re-recording mixer), Martin Lee (adr mixer), Paul J. Zydel (adr mixer), David Yonson (adr recordist))
- 2003 Genie Award for Best Achievement in Overall Sound - Max - Nominated (shared with Lou Solakofski)
- 2003 Gemini Award for Best Sound in a Dramatic Program - Aka Albert Walker - Won (shared with Brandon Walker, Grant Bone, Douglas Ganton, Steve Hammond, Martin Lee)
- 2004 Genie Award for Best Achievement in Overall Sound - Falling Angels - Nominated (shared with Warren St. Onge, Lou Solakofski)
- 2005 Gemini Award for Best Sound in a Dramatic Program - Sex Traffic part 1 - Nominated (shared with Jane Tattersall, Kathy Choi, Roderick Deogrades, Barry Gilmore, Steve Hammond, Ronayne Higginson, Janice Ierulli, Garrett Kerr, David McCallum, Simon Okin, Jane Porter, Mark Shnuriwsky, Lou Solakofski, Robert Warchol)
- 2007 Gemini Award for Best Sound in a Dramatic Program - Above and Beyond - Nominated (with Henry Embry, Ronayne Higginson, Dino Pigat, David Rose, Jane Tattersall)
- 2008 Genie Award for Best Achievement in Overall Sound - Citizen Duane - Nominee (with John J. Thomson, Martin Lee)
