= David Lee (Canadian sound engineer) =

Canadian sound engineer

- Born: 1938; Scotland
- Died: October 16, 2008 (aged 69–70); Panama City, Panama
- Occupation: Sound engineer
- Years active: 1973–2008

David Lee (1938 – October 16, 2008) was a Canadian sound engineer. He won an Oscar for Best Sound Mixing for the film Chicago. He worked on more than 60 films between 1973 and 2008.

== Selected filmography ==
- Chicago (2002)
