= Shake Hands with the Devil (2007 film) =

2007 Canadian biographical war drama film

- Theatrical release poster
- Directed by: Roger Spottiswoode
- Written by: Roméo Dallaire (book); Michael Donovan
- Produced by: Laszlo Barna; Michael Donovan
- Starring: Roy Dupuis; Deborah Unger; James Gallanders; Michel-Ange Nzojibwami; Owen Lebakeng Sejake; Jean-Hugues Anglade; Michel Mongeau; Tom McCamus
- Cinematography: Miroslaw Baszak
- Edited by: Michel Arcand; Louis-Martin Paradis
- Music by: David Hirschfelder
- Production companies: DHX Media/Halifax Film; Barna-Alper Productions; Head Gear Films; Seville Productions
- Distributed by: Seville Pictures
- Release date: September 28, 2007
- Running time: 113 minutes
- Country: Canada
- Languages: English; French

Shake Hands with the Devil is a 2007 Canadian biographical war drama film starring Roy Dupuis as Roméo Dallaire, which premiered at the Toronto International Film Festival in August 2007. Based on Dallaire's autobiographical book Shake Hands with the Devil: The Failure of Humanity in Rwanda, the film recounts Dallaire's harrowing personal journey during the 1994 Rwandan genocide and how the United Nations did not heed Dallaire's urgent pleas for further assistance to halt the massacre.

The film received 12 nominations at the 28th Genie Awards and tied with the film Eastern Promises for most nominations.

== Film production and planned release ==
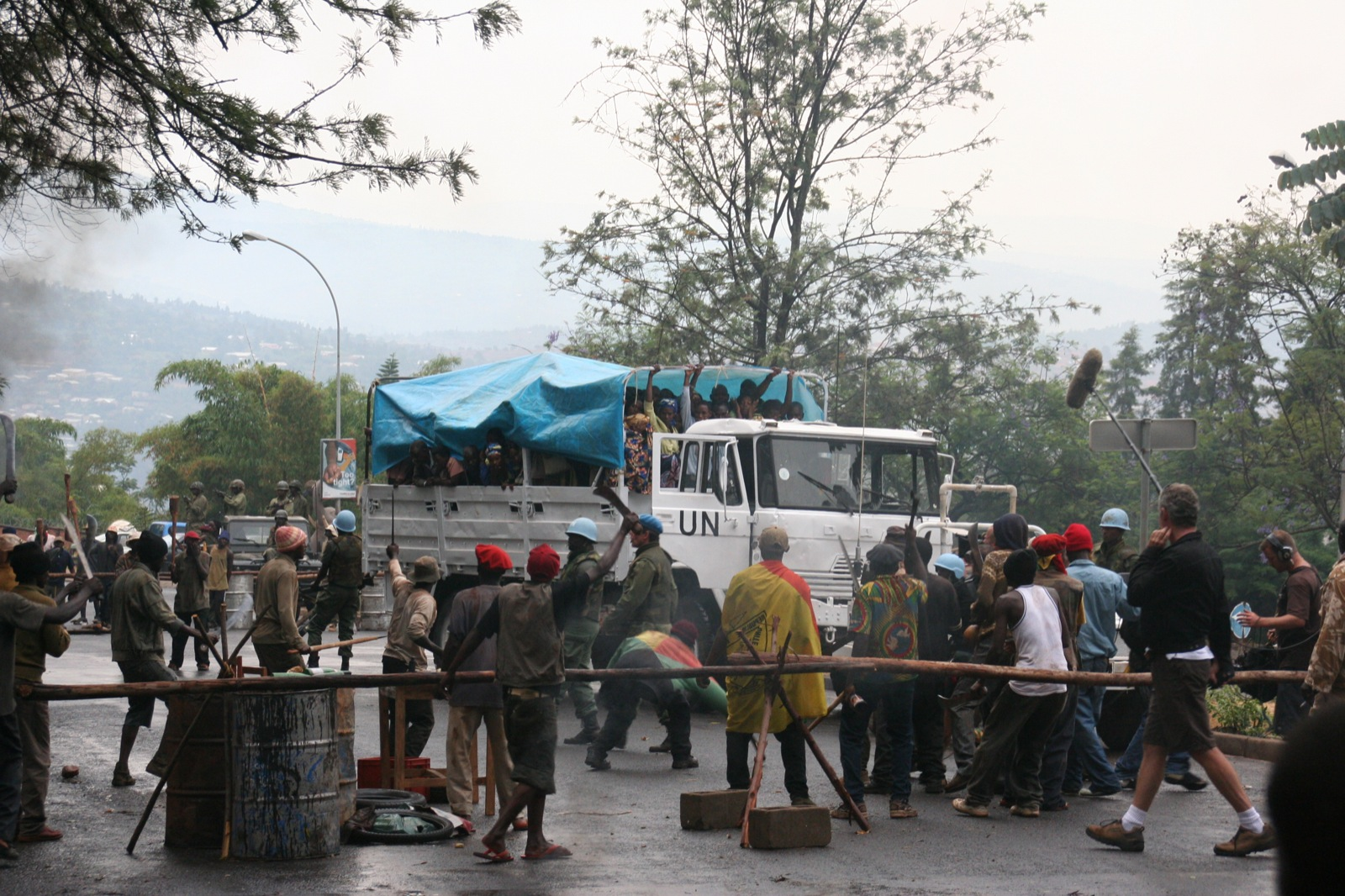
Shake Hands being filmed in Kigali, July 2006

A co-production of Barna-Alper Productions, of Toronto, and Halifax Film Company, of Nova Scotia, the movie was directed by Roger Spottiswoode (Tomorrow Never Dies, And the Band Played On) and filmed in part on location in Kigali, Rwanda, from mid-June to early August 2006 before returning to Halifax for its "final shoot".

A press conference concerning the film, with Dallaire, Dupuis, Spottiswoode, the producers Laszlo Barna (Barna-Alper) and Michael Donovan (Halifax), as well as Wayne Clarkson of Telefilm Canada, occurred in Montréal on June 2, 2006.

In a special account of the filming published in the Toronto Star on 22 July 2006, David Thompson observes that the actor Roy Dupuis "looks eerily like Dallaire, sporting a carefully groomed moustache, summer tan uniform and authentic blue beret":

Indeed, Dupuis is even wearing Dallaire's original army nametag and decorations from 1994. Dallaire is collaborating on this project – right down to a line-by-line review of the script – and insisted on giving Dupuis the decorations to add authenticity. He also gave Dupuis something of himself. "I feel a real connection with this man. He opened up to me", Dupuis says during an interview on the set, the first time he has spoken with media since the gruelling shoot began in Rwanda a month ago. "I'm here because of him." ("One Last Dance with the Devil")

In "New Rwanda Genocide Movie Criticizes U.N. Role", first posted on Reuters on August 9, 2006, Arthur Asiimwe quotes from his interview in Kigali with the film's director Roger Spottiswoode:

"Our film is about a man who was aware genocide was coming and tried to get the U.N. to allow him to do something about it, but ... instead it turned him down ... It is really about the bigger issue of what the U.N. role is in situations like these", he told Reuters at the capital's Amahoro stadium, which sheltered thousands of terrified residents in 1994 as the killers roamed the streets outside.

Spottiswoode said the film was particularly timely given the calls on the United Nations to intervene to end the war in Lebanon, and the ongoing efforts to send a U.N. force to stop rampant murders and rapes in Sudan's troubled Darfur region. The United States has called the Darfur conflict genocide.

On August 13, 2006, Halifax's The Chronicle Herald issued a call for extras, reporting "After filming several months in Kigali, Rwanda, crews return to Halifax to begin the final shoot ... It will be released in Canada [in September 2007] by Seville Pictures. Pay channels The Movie Network, Movie Central, and Super Écran have signed on for broadcast rights, along with the CBC and its French-language network Radio-Canada." According to Marie-Chantal Fiset, in her interview with Jean-Guy Plante published on August 27, 2006, "J'ai serré la main du diable, en version française, devrait sortir en salle en octobre 2007." (The French version of the film, entitled J'ai serré la main du diable, will open in movie theaters in October 2007.)

== Cast ==
- Roy Dupuis as Major-General Roméo Dallaire
- Owen Sejake as Ghanaian General Henry Kwami Anyidoho
- James Gallanders as Major Brent Beardsley
- Michel-Ange Nzojibwami as Colonel Bagosora
- Michel Mongeau as Colonel Luc Marchal
- Robert Lalonde as General Maurice Baril
- John Sibi-Okumu as Jacques-Roger Booh-Booh, head of UNAMIR
- Akin Omotoso as Paul Kagame
- Tom McCamus as Phil Lancaster
- John Matshikiza as President Juvénal Habyarimana
- Jean-Hugues Anglade as Dr. Bernard Kouchner
- Odile Katesi Gakire as Agathe
- Strini Pillai as Bangladeshi Commander
- Craig Hourqueble as Willem
- Kenneth Khambula as Major Kamenzi
- Patrice Faye as Colonel Poncet
- Chris Thorne as Ambassador Carson
- Lena Slachmuijlder as Prime Minister of Rwanda Madame Agathe
- Philip Akin as Boutros Boutros-Ghali
- Amanda Alden as CNN Reporter
- Sarah Ashimwe as Angry Woman
- Mark Antony Krupa as Stefan Stec, Polish victim-saver

== Reception ==
The film received mixed reviews from critics. On Rotten Tomatoes it has an approval rating of 55% based on reviews from 11 critics. On Metacritic the film had an average score of 57 out of 100, based on 8 reviews.

== Festivals ==
Shake Hands with the Devil debuted at the 2007 Toronto International Film Festival, with "Visa" public screenings on September 9 and September 11, 2007. The film opened the 27th Atlantic Film Festival, with the NBC Universal Canada Opening Night Gala screening on September 13, 2007.

== Accolades ==
- 28th Genie Awards
  - Best Motion Picture
  - Achievement in Art Direction/Production Design (Lindsey Hermer-Bell, Justin S.B. Craig)
  - Achievement in Costume Design (Joyce Schure)
  - Achievement in Cinematography (Miroslaw Baszak)
  - Achievement in Direction (Roger Spottiswoode)
  - Achievement in Music – Original Score (David Hirschfelder)
  - Achievement in Music – Original Song ("Kaya" – Valanga Khoza, David Hirschfelder)
  - Performance by an Actor in a Leading Role (Roy Dupuis)
  - Performance by an Actor in a Supporting Role (Michel Ange Nzojibwami)
  - Achievement in Overall Sound (Eric Fitz, Jo Caron, Gavin Fernandes, Benoit Leduc)
  - Achievement in Sound Editing (Marcel Pothier, Guy Francoeur, Antoine Morin, Guy Pelletier, Francois Senneville)
  - Adapted Screenplay (Michael Donovan)

== See also ==
- Shake Hands with the Devil (book)
- Roméo Dallaire
- Rwandan genocide
- List of Canadian films
- Hotel Rwanda, a 2004 film dealing with the genocide that centres on the Hôtel des Mille Collines, a location also seen in Sometimes in April
- Shooting Dogs, a 2005 film centred on the École Technique Officielle in Kigali
