= Lindsey Hermer-Bell =

Canadian production designer

Lindsey Hermer-Bell is a Canadian production designer based in Toronto, Ontario.

== Designer career ==
Born in Johannesburg, South Africa, Lindsey Hermer-Bell moved to Canada in 1977. She received a bachelor's degree in architecture from the University of Toronto.

She began her career as designer on the 1983 HBO drama Between Friends. Her production design credits include the feature film Shake Hands with the Devil (2007), for which she received nominations for both a Genie Award and a Directors Guild of Canada award. Her credits for television include the meticulous construction of the brownstone house of Nero Wolfe for the A&E original film The Golden Spiders: A Nero Wolfe Mystery (2000) and the subsequent series, A Nero Wolfe Mystery (2001–2002). Her production design for the TV series Murdoch Mysteries was nominated for a DGC Craft Award in 2009.

== Squash career ==
Hermer-Bell was a member of Team Canada in squash at the 1993 Maccabiah Games. She won the Canadian Women's Doubles Championships in 2006 and 2007 with Leslie Freeman.

== Filmography ==
Year	Title	Notes
1996	Losing Chase (TV)	
1996	Critical Choices (TV)	
1997	When Secrets Kill (TV)	
1997	When Husbands Cheat (TV)	
1998	Down in the Delta	
1998	The Defenders: Taking the First (TV)	
1999	The Passion of Ayn Rand (TV)	
1999	The City (TV series)	
1999	Rocky Marciano (TV)	
1999	Ricky Nelson: Original Screen Idol (TV)	
1999	In the Company of Spies (TV)	
2000	The Crossing (TV)	
2000	The Golden Spiders: A Nero Wolfe Mystery (TV)	
2000	Thin Air (TV)	
2000	Hendrix (TV)	
2000	The Miracle Worker (TV)	
2000	Leap Years (TV series)	
2001–2002	A Nero Wolfe Mystery (TV series)	
2003	America's Prince: The John F. Kennedy Jr. Story (TV)	
2003	Soldier's Girl (TV)	
2003	Ice Bound: A Woman's Survival at the South Pole (TV)	
2003	Word of Honor (TV)	
2004	Celeste in the City (TV)	
2004	Anonymous Rex (TV)	
2005	Confessions of an American Bride (TV)	
2005	Our Fathers (TV)	
2005	Ambulance Girl (TV)	
2007	Shake Hands with the Devil	Genie Award nominee DGC Craft Award nominee
2007	The Dresden Files (TV series)	
2007–2009	Da Kink in My Hair (TV series)	
2009	Murdoch Mysteries (TV series)	DGC Craft Award nominee
2009–2014	The Listener (TV series)	
2009	Being Erica (TV series)	
2010	When Love Is Not Enough: The Lois Wilson Story (TV)	
2011	Good Dog (TV series)	

== Awards ==
- 2007, Nominee, Genie Award
  Best Achievement in Art Direction/Production Design
  Shake Hands with the Devil
  (shared with Justin Craig)
  Academy of Canadian Cinema and Television
- 2007, Nominee, DGA Craft Award
  Production Design – Feature Film
  Shake Hands with the Devil
  Directors Guild of Canada
- 2009, Nominee, DGA Craft Award
  Production Design – Television Series
  Murdoch Mysteries, "Shades of Grey"
  Directors Guild of Canada
