= John J. Thomson =

Canadian sound mixer

John J. Thomson is a production sound mixer. He was nominated in the 28th Genie Awards for a Genie Award for Best Achievement in Overall Sound (with Steph Carrier and Martin Lee).

== Awards ==
=== Nominated ===
- 2017 Cinema Audio Society (CAS) Award nominee for a one-hour television series, The Handmaid's Tale, episode 1
- 2008 Genie Award nominee for Best Achievement in Overall Sound (with Steph Carrier and Martin Lee)
- 2003 CAS Award nominee for Outstanding Sound Mixing for Television - MOWs and Mini-Series - Martin and Lewis (with colleagues)
- 2001 CAS Award nominee for Outstanding Sound Mixing for Television - MOWs and Mini-Series - Dirty Pictures (with colleagues)
- 2000 Emmy Award nominee for Outstanding Sound Mixing for a Miniseries or a Movie - Dirty Pictures (with colleagues)

=== Won ===
- 2006 Gemini Award for Best Sound in a Comedy, Variety, or Performing Arts Program or Series - Black Widow (with Steve Hammond, Ronayne Higginson, Kirk Lynds, David McCallum, David Rose, Lou Solakofski)
- 2005 Gemini Award for Best Sound in a Dramatic Program - Lives of the Saints
- 1999 Genie Award for Best Overall Sound - Last Night (with Dean Giammarco, Miguel Nunes, Paul A. Sharpe)
- 1999 Gemini Award for Best Overall Sound in a Dramatic Program or Series - Total Recall 2070 episode "Machine Dreams" Part 1 (with Allen Ormerod, Steve Baine, Scott Shepherd)
- Fall 1998 Gemini Award for Best Sound in an Information/Documentary Program or Series - Yo-Yo Ma Inspired by Bach episode The Music Garden (with David McCallum, Lou Solakofski, Robert Fletcher)
