= Douglas Ganton =

Canadian sound engineer

- Occupation: Sound engineer
- Years active: 1975-2009

Douglas Ganton is an American sound engineer. He was nominated for an Academy Award in the category Best Sound. for the film Legends of the Fall. He worked on 75 films from 1975 to 2009.

== Selected filmography ==
- Legends of the Fall (1994)
