= Stuart Wilson (sound engineer) =

Scottish sound engineer

- Occupation: Sound engineer
- Years active: 1992-present

Stuart Wilson is a Scottish sound engineer working in feature films.

He has been nominated for 7 Academy Awards, for the films War Horse in 2012, Skyfall in 2013, Star Wars: The Force Awakens in 2016, Rogue One in 2017, Star Wars: The Last Jedi in 2018, 1917 in 2020 and The Batman, winning the award for 1917. He was nominated for a British Academy Film Award for The Constant Gardener in 2006, Harry Potter and the Deathly Hallows – Part 2 and War Horse in 2012, Skyfall in 2013, Star Wars: The Force Awakens in 2016, Star Wars: The Last Jedi in 2018 and Star Wars: The Rise of Skywalker and 1917 in 2020. He won the award for the later.

== Awards and nominations ==
Year	Association	Category	Work	Result
2012	Academy Awards	Best Sound Mixing	War Horse	Nominated
2013	Academy Awards	Best Sound Mixing	Skyfall	Nominated
2016	Academy Awards	Best Sound Mixing	Star Wars: The Force Awakens	Nominated
2017	Academy Awards	Best Sound Mixing	Rogue One	Nominated
2018	Academy Awards	Best Sound Mixing	Star Wars: The Last Jedi	Nominated
2020	Academy Awards	Best Sound Mixing	1917	Won
2023	Academy Awards	Best Sound	The Batman	Nominated
2006	BAFTA Awards	BAFTA Award for Best Sound	The Constant Gardener	Nominated
2012	BAFTA Awards	BAFTA Award for Best Sound	War Horse	Nominated
2012	BAFTA Awards	BAFTA Award for Best Sound	Harry Potter and the Deathly Hallows – Part 2	Nominated
2013	BAFTA Awards	BAFTA Award for Best Sound	Skyfall	Nominated
2016	BAFTA Awards	BAFTA Award for Best Sound	Star Wars: The Force Awakens	Nominated
2018	BAFTA Awards	BAFTA Award for Best Sound	Star Wars: The Last Jedi	Nominated
2020	BAFTA Awards	BAFTA Award for Best Sound	Star Wars: The Rise of Skywalker	Nominated
2020	BAFTA Awards	BAFTA Award for Best Sound	1917	Won
2016	Association of Motion Picture Sound (AMPS)	Excellence in Sound for a Feature Film	Spectre	Nominated
2016	Association of Motion Picture Sound (AMPS)	Excellence in Sound for a Feature Film	Star Wars: The Force Awakens	Nominated
2020	Association of Motion Picture Sound (AMPS)	Excellence in Sound for a Feature Film	1917	Won
2016	Awards Circuit Community Awards	Best Achievement in Sound	Rogue One	Nominated
2017	Awards Circuit Community Awards	Best Achievement in Sound	Star Wars: The Last Jedi	Nominated
2020	Awards Circuit Community Awards	Best Sound	1917	Won
2003	British Independent Film Awards	Best Technical Achievement	In This World	Nominated
2013	Cinema Audio Society Awards	Outstanding Achievement in Sound Mixing for a Motion Picture – Live Action	Skyfall	Nominated
2016	Cinema Audio Society Awards	Outstanding Achievement in Sound Mixing for a Motion Picture – Live Action	Star Wars: The Force Awakens	Nominated
2017	Cinema Audio Society Awards	Outstanding Achievement in Sound Mixing for a Motion Picture – Live Action	Rogue One	Nominated
2018	Cinema Audio Society Awards	Outstanding Achievement in Sound Mixing for a Motion Picture – Live Action	Star Wars: The Last Jedi	Nominated
2021	CinEuphoria Awards	Best Sound/Sound Effects - International Competition	1917	Won
2008	Genie Awards	Best Sound Mixing	Eastern Promises	Won
2012	Golden Derby Awards	Sound	Harry Potter and the Deathly Hallows - Part 2	Nominated
2013	Golden Derby Awards	Sound	Skyfall	Nominated
2016	Golden Derby Awards	Sound	Star Wars: The Force Awakens	Nominated
2017	Golden Derby Awards	Sound	Rogue One	Nominated
2018	Golden Derby Awards	Sound	Star Wars: The Last Jedi	Nominated
2020	Golden Derby Awards	Sound	1917	Won
2020	Golden Derby Awards	Sound of the Decade	1917	Nominated
2023	Hollywood Critics Association	Best Sound	The Batman	Nominated
2020	International Cinephile Society	Best Sound Design	1917	Nominated
2013	International Online Cinema Awards	Best Sound Mixing	Skyfall	Nominated
2016	International Online Cinema Awards	Best Sound Mixing	Star Wars: The Force Awakens	Nominated
2020	International Online Cinema Awards	Best Sound Mixing	1917	Nominated
2020	Latino Entertainment Journalists Association	Best Sound	1917 (2019 film)	Won
2012	Online Film & Television Association	Best Sound Mixing	War Horse	Nominated
2012	Online Film & Television Association	Best Sound Mixing	Harry Potter and the Deathly Hallows - Part 2	Nominated
2013	Online Film & Television Association	Best Sound Mixing	Skyfall	Nominated
2016	Online Film & Television Association	Best Sound Mixing	Star Wars: The Force Awakens	Nominated
2017	Online Film & Television Association	Best Sound Mixing	Rogue One	Nominated
2018	Online Film & Television Association	Best Sound Mixing	Star Wars: The Last Jedi	Nominated
2020	Online Film & Television Association	Best Sound Mixing	Star Wars: The Rise of Skywalker	Nominated
2020	Online Film & Television Association	Best Sound Mixing	1917	Won
2011	Satellite Awards	Best Sound	Harry Potter and the Deathly Hallows - Part 2	Nominated
2011	Satellite Awards	Best Sound	War Horse	Nominated
2016	Satellite Awards	Best Sound	Spectre (2015 film)	Nominated
2019	Satellite Awards	Best Sound	1917	Nominated
2016	Seattle Film Critics Society	Best Sound Design	Star Wars: The Force Awakens	Nominated
