= John Douglas Smith =

Canadian sound editor (born 1966)

John Douglas Smith (born 4 August 1966 in Hamilton, Ontario) is a Canadian sound editor.

In 1988, he graduated with a degree in Media Arts from Sheridan College. He was a sound designer for the 1993 Genie Award winning film Thirty Two Short Films About Glenn Gould. Smith has twice won the Genie Award for "Best Achievement in Sound Editing". At the 17th Genie Awards in Toronto in 1996, he won the award for the film Crash. In 2003, he won at the 24th Genie Awards for his sound editing work in The Statement.

Smith won the 2003 Emmy Award in the category "Outstanding Sound Editing For A Miniseries, Movie Or A Special" for his work as Supervising Sound Editor in the CBS special, Hitler: The Rise of Evil. He was also nominated for an Emmy in 2012 in the category "Outstanding Sound Editing For A Miniseries, Movie Or A Special" as sound editor for the History Channel miniseries Hatfields & McCoys. He was also won a Daytime Emmy in 2020 in the category "Outstanding Sound Editing For Outstanding Sound Editing for a Live Action Program" as sound editor for the PBS series Odd Squad.
