= Christian Cooke (sound engineer) =

Canadian audio engineer

Christian T. Cooke (born January 23, 1959) is a Canadian audio engineer, best known for his work in 2017 film The Shape of Water for which he was co-nominated with Brad Zoern and Glen Gauthier for Sound Mixing at 90th Academy Awards. He was born in Toronto.
