= Eastern Promises =

2007 crime film by David Cronenberg

- Theatrical release poster
- Directed by: David Cronenberg
- Screenplay by: Steven Knight
- Produced by: Paul Webster; Robert Lantos
- Starring: Viggo Mortensen; Naomi Watts; Vincent Cassel; Armin Mueller-Stahl
- Cinematography: Peter Suschitzky
- Edited by: Ronald Sanders
- Music by: Howard Shore
- Production companies: BBC Films; Kudos Pictures; Serendipity Point Films; Scion Films
- Distributed by: Pathé Distribution (United Kingdom); Alliance Atlantis (Canada)
- Release dates: September 8, 2007 (Toronto); September 14, 2007 (United States); October 26, 2007 (United Kingdom)
- Running time: 101 minutes
- Countries: United Kingdom; Canada
- Languages: English; Russian; Ukrainian
- Budget: $27 million
- Box office: $56.1 million

Eastern Promises is a 2007 gangster crime thriller film directed by David Cronenberg and written by Steven Knight. Starring Viggo Mortensen, Naomi Watts, Vincent Cassel, and Armin Mueller-Stahl, the film follows Anna Khitrova (Watts), a Russian-British midwife who delivers the baby daughter of a drug-addicted 14-year-old Russian prostitute named Tatiana. After Tatiana dies in childbirth, Anna reads the girl's diary and discovers that she was trafficked by the Russian Mafia in London. When Semyon (Mueller-Stahl), the leader of the mobsters and the owner of the Trans-Siberian Restaurant, threatens the baby's life, Anna is warned off by both his immature son, Kirill (Cassel), and his menacing bodyguard and driver, Nikolai Luzhin (Mortensen).

Principal photography began in London on November 19, 2006, and concluded on February 16, 2007. The film has been noted for its treatment of the subject of sex trafficking, and for its violence and realistic depiction of Russian career criminals, which includes the detailed portrayal of the tattoos which indicate their crimes and criminal status.

Eastern Promises premiered at the Toronto International Film Festival on September 8, 2007, where it won the People's Choice Award. The film was theatrically released in the United States and Canada on September 14, 2007, to critical acclaim, with particular praise for the performances of the cast. It was also a modest success at the box office, grossing $56.1 million against its $27 million production budget. Mortensen received numerous accolades for his performance, winning the Satellite Award for Best Actor in a Motion Picture, and was nominated for the Academy Award for Best Actor, the Golden Globe Award for Best Actor in a Motion Picture – Drama, the BAFTA Award for Best Actor in a Leading Role, the Critics' Choice Movie Award for Best Actor, and the Saturn Award for Best Actor.

== Plot ==
Anna Khitrova, a Russian-British midwife who works at Trafalgar Hospital in London, finds a Russian language diary belonging to Tatiana, a 14-year-old drug-addicted prostitute who is pregnant. When Tatiana suffers a placental abruption, Anna performs a caesarian section and delivers a baby girl, but Tatiana dies in childbirth. Not wanting the baby to end up in foster care, Anna sets out to track down Tatiana's family. Though Anna's British mother, Helen, is open to the idea, Anna's Russian uncle, Stepan, a former KGB officer, urges caution. While reading Tatiana's diary, Anna finds a business card for the Trans-Siberian Restaurant and decides to meet with the owner, Semyon, who gives her a tour of the restaurant. Semyon is a seemingly kind older gentleman, but unbeknownst to Anna, he is a vor in the Russian mafia. When Anna tells Semyon about the diary, he offers to translate it, but she gives him a photocopy of the diary instead.

Semyon's driver, Nikolai Luzhin, serves as the family "cleaner" and bodyguard of Kirill, Semyon's son. Kirill, a hedonistic drunk who repeatedly disappoints Semyon, authorizes a hit on Soyka, a rival Chechen leader with the help of a Kurdish associate, Azim, without Semyon's approval. Upon finding Soyka's body stored in a freezer, Kirill spits on him, calling him a pederast, but Nikolai later tells Semyon that Soyka had been spreading rumours that Kirill is gay. Nikolai removes Soyka's wallet from his body and amputates his fingers to impede identification, which is then dumped in the Thames by Nikolai and Kirill. At a whorehouse, Kirill pressures Nikolai into having sex with one of the trafficked girls in order to prove that he's not gay. Nikolai chooses a Ukrainian girl referred to as Kirilenko, and the two have sex as Kirill watches. After Kirill leaves the room, Nikolai's personality subtly changes and he questions Kirilenko to reveal her full name and that she is from Irpin. Nikolai then gives her all of his cash and a religious icon card, telling her to live a little longer. Later, the UK police come and take her into custody.

When Anna learns from Helen that Stepan had translated the diary without her knowledge, they tell her that Semyon raped Tatiana after Kirill failed to do so, explaining that he would show Kirill how to "break" her. The diary also states that Semyon gave her pills to induce an abortion, and Anna realizes that the baby was fathered by Semyon. When Semyon realizes that Anna knows the truth, he makes a disconcerting appearance in her hospital ward, which is off limits to visitors. Frightened, Anna agrees to hand over the diary in exchange for the location of Tatiana's family. Anna, Stepan, and Helen meet with Nikolai at a fast-food restaurant, where he takes the diary but denies knowing about revealing the family's address. As Nikolai is leaving, Anna confronts him and accuses the mafia of murdering Tatiana. After Stepan spits in Nikolai's face, Semyon burns the diary and orders Nikolai to kill Stepan, who goes missing.

Semyon sponsors Nikolai as a full member due to his protection of Kirill and arranges a meeting with high-ranking members of the mafia. During the meeting, Nikolai, with his tattoos on display, reveals that he has no mother or father, was arrested at fifteen for stealing autoparts, and was sent to solitary confinement numerous times, earning the nickname "The Stump." Impressed, the mobsters promote Nikolai and he gets stars tattooed on his knees and chest. Meanwhile, Soyka's vengeful brothers arrive and kill Ekrem, Azim's mentally disabled nephew whom Azim had forced to kill Soyka. Azim confesses his role in the hit to Semyon, whom he forgives in exchange for participating in a plan to save Kirill. After Azim lures Nikolai into a meeting at a public baths, the brothers, who are deceived into believing he is Kirill, ambush Nikolai. A fight ensues and the brothers stab Nikolai multiple times, but he manages to kill both of them before losing consciousness.

Nikolai is rushed to Trafalgar for emergency surgery and survives as Anna waits for him to recover. Anna confronts Nikolai about Stepan's disappearance, threatening to go to the police if he refuses to speak. He tells her that Stepan is staying at the Caledonia, a five-star hotel in Edinburgh, for his protection. Yuri, a Scotland Yard officer investigating the Russian mafia, arrives at Trafalgar and asks the receptionist for Nikolai. It is revealed that Nikolai is actually an undercover FSB agent working under license from the British government. When Yuri tells Nikolai that the Russian embassy has requested to terminate the undercover operation, Nikolai shows Yuri his newly acquired star tattoos. Nikolai tells Yuri to have Semyon arrested and charged with statutory rape, using a paternity test of Tatiana's baby as evidence. With Semyon in prison, this will allow Nikolai to support Kirill's ascension to head of the organization.

As Anna finishes her shift, she spots Kirill entering an elevator with a large suitcase and finds that the baby is gone, replaced with a bouquet of roses. Assuming that Nikolai is involved, Anna confronts him and demands the baby's whereabouts, but he denies having knowledge about the kidnapping. The two rush to the spot on the Thames where Nikolai and Kirill had previously disposed of Soyka's body and find a tearful Kirill sitting by the river, having been ordered by his father to kill his baby sister. Nikolai and Anna persuade him to give the baby back and Nikolai embraces and consoles Kirill, telling him that Semyon is finished and that they will be taking control of the mafia. Anna and Nikolai share a kiss before he departs with Kirill to celebrate New Year's Day. Sometime later, Nikolai succeeds Semyon as head of the organization and Anna adopts Tatiana's baby, whom she names Christine.

== Cast ==
- Viggo Mortensen as Nikolai Luzhin
- Naomi Watts as Anna "Anya" Ivanovna Khitrova
- Armin Mueller-Stahl as Semyon
- Vincent Cassel as Kirill Semyonovich
- Sinéad Cusack as Helen
- Mina E. Mina as Azim
- Jerzy Skolimowski as Stepan Khitrov
- Donald Sumpter as Yuri
- Raza Jaffrey as Dr. Aziz
- Josef Altin as Ekrem
- Sarah-Jeanne Labrosse as Tatiana
  - Tatiana Maslany as Tatiana’s voice
- Tereza Srbova as Kirilenko
- Mike Sarne as Valery
- Elisa Lasowski as Alma
- Boris Isarov as Vadim
- Yuri Klimov as Boyan
- Mia Soteriou as Azim’s wife
- Aleksandar Mikic as Soyka
- Tamer Hassan & David Papava as Chechen assassins
- Olegar Fedoro as the tattooist
- Igor Outkine as Singer/Accordion player

== Production ==
=== Filming ===
Shooting began in November 2006, and various scenes were filmed in St John Street, Farringdon, London. Filming also took place in Broadway Market, Hackney and in Brompton Cemetery in the London Borough of Kensington & Chelsea. The "Trans-Siberian Restaurant" is located in The Farmiloe Building, 34 St John Street, next to Smithfield Market. This is the 6th most popular film and TV location in London, having also been used for Spooks, Penelope and Batman Begins. When Anna, her mother Helen, and her uncle Stepan meet Nikolai at a fast food restaurant, this was filmed in Bermondsey, south-east London at a Wimpy bar.

The entrance to the "Ankara Social Club" of the film is actually the front door of a residential flat. The Broadway Market hair dresser known as "Broadway Gents Hairstylist" was changed to "Azim's Hair Salon", where in the film one of the Russians is murdered. The owner Mr. Ismail Yesiloglu decided to keep most of the shop front after filming. In the original script, the name was "Ozim's Hair Salon", but it was later changed to "Azim's" as there is no such name as Ozim in Turkish. The "Trafalgar Hospital" is actually the Middlesex Hospital, a hospital in the Fitzrovia area of London, which closed to patients in December 2005. The building in central London, which was knocked down in 2008, had the inscription 'Trafalgar Hospital', matching the style and apparent age of the old Middlesex Hospital, inserted into the legend above the main door. The fight scene in the Turkish Baths was filmed on a custom set based on the Ironmonger Row Baths in Islington.

Eastern Promises was David Cronenberg's first film to be shot entirely outside Canada.

=== Tattoos ===
Viggo Mortensen studied Russian gangsters and their tattoos. Mortensen spent a lot of time with a Russian Mafia specialist, Gilly McKenzie (organised crime specialist for the UN) and also consulted a documentary on the subject called The Mark of Cain (2000). The tattoos that he wore, according to the New York Daily News, were so realistic that diners in a Russian restaurant in London fell silent out of fear, until Mortensen revealed his identity and admitted the tattoos were for a film. From that day on he washed off his tattoos whenever he went off the set. Mortensen said of the significance of the tattoos:

I talked to them [authentic gangsters and Gilly McKenzie] about what they meant and where they were on the body, what that said about where they'd been, what their specialties were, what their ethnic and geographical affiliations were. Basically their history, their calling card, is their body.

=== Violence ===
Consistent with the trademark violence in much of Cronenberg's work, Eastern Promises features a graphically violent fight scene in a steam bath where the combatants wield linoleum knives. When asked in an interview about the difference between "gun violence" and "knife violence," Cronenberg replied, "We have no guns in this movie. There were no guns in the script. The choice of those curved knives we use in the steam bath was mine. They're not some kind of exotic Turkish knives, they're linoleum knives. I felt that these guys could walk around in the streets with these knives, and if they were ever caught, they could say 'we're linoleum cutters'."

== Director's commentary ==
Adam Nayman of Eye Weekly reported that director Cronenberg said "just don't give the plot away" and Nayman wrote "his request is understandable." Nayman said "there is one scene – the in-depth discussion of which prompted the director's anti-spoiler request referenced at the top of this story – that should rank not only in his personal pantheon of spectacularly deployed gore but among the most exhilaratingly visceral patches of cinema, period, full stop." Chicago Sun-Times critic Roger Ebert noted Cronenberg's quote and agreed, saying: "He is correct that it would be fatal, because this is not a movie of what or how, but of why. And for a long time you don't see the why coming."

== Release ==
The film premiered on September 8, 2007, at the 2007 Toronto International Film Festival where it won the Audience Prize for best film on September 15, 2007. Eastern Promises opened in limited release in Russia on September 13, 2007.

In the United States and Canada, the film opened in limited release in 15 theatres on September 14, 2007, and grossed $547,092 — averaging $36,472 per theater. The film opened in wide release in the United States and Canada on September 21, 2007, (expanding to 1,404 theaters) and ranked #5 at the box office, grossing $5,659,133 — an average of $4,030 per theater. The film has grossed $56,106,607 worldwide as of March 17, 2019 — $17,266,000 in the United States and Canada and $38,840,607 in other territories.

The film took part in competition at the San Sebastian Film Festival September 20, 2007. The film was shown at the London Film Festival on October 17, 2007, and was released in the United Kingdom on October 26, 2007.

== Reception ==
The review aggregator Rotten Tomatoes reported that 89% based on 198 reviews, with an average rating 7.70/10. The website's critical consensus reads, "David Cronenberg triumphs again, showcasing the Viggo Mortensen's onscreen prowess in a daring performance. Bearing the trademarks of psychological drama and gritty violence, Eastern Promises is a very compelling crime story." On Metacritic, the film has a weighted average score of 83 out of 100, based on 35 critics, indicating "universal acclaim".

Todd McCarthy of Variety, David Elliott of The San Diego Union-Tribune, and film critic Tony Medley noted the twists in the film. Roger Ebert of the Chicago Sun-Times gave the film four out of four stars and wrote "Eastern Promises is no ordinary crime thriller, just as Cronenberg is no ordinary director", and said that "Cronenberg has moved film by film into the top rank of directors, and here he wisely reunites with Mortensen" who "digs so deeply into the role you may not recognize him at first." Ebert said the film has a fight scene that "sets the same kind of standard that The French Connection set for chases. Years from now, it will be referred to as a benchmark."

J. Hoberman of The Village Voice said "I've said it before and hope to again: David Cronenberg is the most provocative, original, and consistently excellent North American director of his generation." Hoberman said the film is "directed with considerable formal intelligence and brooding power" and continues the trend of "murderous family dramas" seen in Spider and A History of Violence. Hoberman called the film "graphic but never gratuitous in its violence", "garish yet restrained", "a masterful mood piece", "deceptively generic" and said the film "suggests a naturalized version of the recent Russian horror flick Night Watch." When describing the cast, Hoberman said "Mueller-Stahl may be perfunctory ... but Vincent Cassel literally flings himself into [his role]" and "Mortensen is even more electrifying as Nikolai than in A History of Violence".

Chris Vognar of The Dallas Morning News gave the film a "B+" and said "The film's genius performance belongs to the venerable Armin Mueller-Stahl, who plays the family head with a twinkling eye and an air of avuncular, Old World charm." Vognar wrote "Where some may see melodrama, Mr. Cronenberg locates timeless, elemental struggles between good and evil, right and wrong. But he makes sure to place a mysterious gray area front and center, personified here by Mr. Mortensen's Nikolai", writing "Nikolai Luzhin is ... like Ray Bradbury's Illustrated Man ... only more dangerous" and "scarily enigmatic." Vognar wrote that Eastern Promises shares themes of "ambiguous identity and rage-soaked duality" with A History of Violence and said both films "have a lock-step precision and both take a sly kind of joy in subverting genre expectations." Vognar said Eastern Promises "is a little too mechanical for its own good ... but the mechanics also produce an admirable crispness and sense of purpose, a sense that the man behind the camera knows exactly what he's doing at all times."

Film Journal International critic Doris Toumarkine said the film is a "highly entertaining but sometimes revolting look at a particularly venal branch of the Russian mob." Toumarkine wrote that Mortensen and Watts "are intriguing moral counterpoints. They are also the key ingredients that make Eastern Promises a highly delectable and cinematically rich borsht that upscale film fans will devour." She described Mortensen's performance as "startling," called Watts "touching," Cassel "particularly delicious," but said "Mueller-Stahl, Cusack, and Skolimowski don't have as much to chew on." She said the film "is also blessed by Howard Shore's restrained score, which lets the film's other estimable elements breathe through." Toumarkine also said the film is "essentially a character-driven crime thriller but is also a bloody tour de force laced with considerable nudity and sexually bold content that will rattle the squeamish."

Bruce Westbrook of the Houston Chronicle gave the film one star out of four and said it had a "contrived plot" and wrote "what it's really about, more than sensitivity for displaced people or social analyses, is violence — hideous, gruesome, over-the-top violence." Westbrook said "For Cronenberg, such cheap sensationalism is business as usual, and this far into his career, that business has slipped into artistic bankruptcy." Westbrook wrote the film "isn't about Russian gangs so much as Cronenberg's own dark passions not just for violence but excruciating carnage, which he brandishes mercilessly" and that the film was "a stifling descent into grim shock and disturbing awe."

== Accolades ==
Eastern Promises won the Audience Prize for best film on September 15, 2007, at the 2007 Toronto International Film Festival. The film received three Golden Globe nominations for the 65th Golden Globe Awards, being nominated for Best Motion Picture - Drama, Best Original Score and a Best Actor – Motion Picture Drama nomination for Mortensen, but the film failed to win any. The film was nominated in five different categories in the British Independent Film Awards for 2007, and won in one category: Best Performance by an Actor in a British Independent Film (for Mortensen).

Mortensen was also nominated for Academy Award for Best Actor at the 80th Academy Awards, but told the Associated Press: "If there's a strike I will not go." — a reference to the ongoing Writers Guild of America strike. On February 12, 2008, the strike ended, and he attended the ceremony, although he lost the award to Daniel Day-Lewis for There Will Be Blood. Eastern Promises received twelve nominations at the 28th Genie Awards, tying with the film Shake Hands with the Devil for most nominations, and won seven, Best Supporting Actor (Mueller-Stahl), Screenplay, Cinematography, Editing, Musical Score, Overall Sound, Sound Editing. It was also the last TIFF People's Choice Award winner to not win any of its Oscar nominations until Steven Spielberg's The Fabelmans in 2022.

=== Top ten lists ===
The film appeared on many critics' top ten lists of the best films of 2007.

- 1st — Marc Doyle, Metacritic.com
- 2nd — J. Hoberman, The Village Voice
- 4th — Manohla Dargis, The New York Times (tied with Colossal Youth)
- 4th — Peter Travers, Rolling Stone
- 4th — Steven Rea, The Philadelphia Inquirer
- 5th — Frank Scheck, The Hollywood Reporter
- 7th — Liam Lacey & Rick Groen, The Globe and Mail
- 7th — Scott Foundas, LA Weekly (tied with Before the Devil Knows You're Dead)
- 8th — Desson Thomson, The Washington Post
- 9th — Nathan Lee, The Village Voice
- 9th — Shawn Levy, The Oregonian
- 10th — Jack Mathews, New York Daily News
- 10th — Marjorie Baumgarten, The Austin Chronicle

== Cancelled sequel ==
Speaking in August 2010, Cassel said that a sequel was discussed with Cronenberg whilst they were filming A Dangerous Method. Cassel suggested that the sequel will be filmed in Russia with Cassel and Mortensen reprising their roles. In April 2012, producer Paul Webster told Screen International that a sequel was in the works, which would reunite director Cronenberg, writer Knight, and actor Mortensen. The film was said to be made by Webster's new production company Shoebox Films in collaboration with Focus Features and was to begin production in early 2013. That August, however, Cronenberg stated that Eastern Promises 2 was "dead": "We were supposed to start shooting 'Eastern Promises 2' in October ... [But] It's done. If you don't like it talk to James Schamus at Focus. It was his decision." On December 2, 2020, Knight revealed that the sequel became the upcoming separate Martin Zandvliet film Small Dark Look starring Jason Statham.
