= Luc Boudrias =

Canadian sound engineer (born 1960)

Luc Boudrias (born March 9, 1960) is a Canadian sound re-recording mixer, most noted as a Genie Award, Canadian Screen Award and Prix Iris winner for his work in film.

== Awards ==
Award	Date of ceremony	Category	Film	Result	Ref.
Genie Awards	1991	Best Overall Sound	Moody Beach with Michel Descombes, Jo Caron, Richard Besse	Nominated	
Genie Awards	1992	Best Overall Sound	Being at Home with Claude with Jo Caron, Michel Descombes, Michel Charron	Nominated	
Genie Awards	1994	Best Overall Sound	A Hero's Life (La Vie d'un héros) with Réjean Juteau, Richard Besse, Michel Descombes	Nominated	
Genie Awards	1995	Best Overall Sound	Black List (Liste noire) with Gavin Fernandes, Daniel Masse, Michel Descombes	Nominated	
Genie Awards	1997	Best Overall Sound	Karmina with Don Cohen, Jo Caron, Bruno Ruffolo	Nominated	
Genie Awards	2001	Best Overall Sound	Maelström with Gilles Corbeil, Luc Boudrias, Louis Gignac	Nominated	
Genie Awards	2002	Best Overall Sound	Karmina 2 with Yvon Benoît, Jo Caron, Benoit Leduc	Nominated	
Genie Awards	2002	Best Overall Sound	A Girl at the Window (Une jeune fille à la fenêtre) with Dominique Chartrand, Bernard Gariépy Strobl, Hans Peter Strobl	Nominated	
Genie Awards	2005	Best Overall Sound	Looking for Alexander (Mémoires affectives) with Christian Bouchard, Jo Caron, Clovis Gouaillier, Benoît Leduc	Nominated	
Genie Awards	2006	Best Overall Sound	C.R.A.Z.Y. with Yvon Benoît, Daniel Bisson, Bernard Gariépy Strobl	Won	
Genie Awards	2007	Best Overall Sound	The Rocket (Maurice Richard) with Claude Hazanavicius, Claude Beaugrand, Bernard Gariépy Strobl	Nominated	
Genie Awards	2009	Best Overall Sound	Le Banquet with Mario Auclair, François Senneville	Nominated	
Genie Awards	2009	Best Overall Sound	The American Trap (Le Piège américain) with Claude La Haye, Daniel Bisson, Patrick Lalonde	Nominated	
Genie Awards	2010	Best Overall Sound	The Master Key (Grande Ourse: La Clé des possibles) with Mario Auclair, Daniel Bisson, Jean-Charles Desjardins	Nominated	
Genie Awards	2011	Best Overall Sound	7 Days (Les 7 jours du Talion)	Nominated	
Canadian Screen Awards	2013	Best Overall Sound	Mars and April (Mars et Avril) with Olivier Calvert, Pascal Beaudin	Nominated	
Canadian Screen Awards	2017	Best Overall Sound	Race with Claude La Haye, Pierre-Jules Audet	Won	
Prix Jutra/Iris	2002	Best Sound	A Girl at the Window (Une jeune fille à la fenêtre) with Dominique Chartrand, Marcel Pothier	Nominated	
Prix Jutra/Iris	2006	Best Sound	C.R.A.Z.Y. with Yvon Benoît, Daniel Bisson, Bernard Gariépy Strobl, Mira Mailhot, Simon Meilleur, Mireille Morin, Martin Pinsonnault, Jean-François Sauvé	Won	
Prix Jutra/Iris	2006	Best Sound	The Rocket (Maurice Richard)	Nominated	
Prix Jutra/Iris	2010	Best Sound	The Master Key (Grande Ourse, la clé des possibles) with Mario Auclair, Pierre-Jules Audet, Louis Gignac	Nominated	
Prix Jutra/Iris	2011	Best Sound	7 Days (Les 7 Jours du Talion) with Michel Lecoufle, Pierre-Jules Audet	Nominated	
Prix Jutra/Iris	2012	Best Sound	Fear of Water (La Peur de l'eau) with Mario Auclair, Pierre-Jules Audet	Nominated	
Prix Jutra/Iris	2013	Best Sound	L'Affaire Dumont with Pierre-Jules Audet, Michel Lecoufle	Nominated	
Prix Jutra/Iris	2013	Best Sound	Mars and April (Mars et Avril) with Pascal Beaudin, Olivier Calvert	Nominated	
Prix Jutra/Iris	2013	Best Sound	The Torrent (Le Torrent) with Marcel Chouinard, Patrice Leblanc	Nominated	
Prix Jutra/Iris	2016	Best Sound	Elephant Song with Claude La Haye, Claude Beaugrand, Patrick Lalonde	Nominated	
Prix Jutra/Iris	2016	Best Sound	The Sound of Trees (Le bruit des arbres) with François Grenon, Sylvain Bellemare	Nominated	
Prix Jutra/Iris	2017	Best Sound	Race with Pierre-Jules Audet, Claude La Haye	Nominated	
Prix Jutra/Iris	2019	Best Sound	La Bolduc with Claude Beaugrand, Michel B. Bordeleau, Gilles Corbeil	Won	
Prix Jutra/Iris	2019	Best Sound	The Great Darkened Days (La grande noirceur) with Frédéric Cloutier, Stephen De Oliveira	Nominated	
Prix Jutra/Iris	2019	Best Sound in a Documentary	My Mother's Letters (Les lettres de ma mère) with Claude Beaugrand, Serge Giguère	Nominated	
Prix Jutra/Iris	2020	Best Sound	Mafia Inc. with Sylvain Brassard, Jean Camden	Nominated	
Prix Jutra/Iris	2020	Best Sound in a Documentary	A Woman, My Mother (Une femme, ma mère) with Patrice LeBlanc	Nominated	
Prix Jutra/Iris	2021	Best Sound	Underground (Souterrain) with Frédéric Cloutier, Patrice LeBlanc	Won	
Prix Jutra/Iris	2021	Best Sound in a Documentary	Wandering: A Rohingya Story (Errance sans retour) with Pierre-Jules Audet, Olivier Higgins, Kala Miya	Nominated	
Prix Jutra/Iris	2022	Best Sound	The Time Thief (L'arracheuse de temps) with Olivier Calvert, Yann Cleary	Nominated	
Prix Jutra/Iris	2023	Best Sound	The Dishwasher (Le Plongeur) with Olivier Calvert, Yann Cleary	Nominated	
Prix Jutra/Iris	2023	Best Sound	Family Game (Arseneault et fils) with Daniel Fontaine-Bégin, Henry Godding Jr.	Nominated	
Prix Jutra/Iris	2024	Best Sound	Days of Happiness (Les Jours heureux) with Sylvain Bellemare, François Goupil, Stephen De Oliveira	Nominated	
Prix Jutra/Iris	2024	Best Sound	Hunting Daze (Jour de chasse) with Samuel Gagnon-Thibodeau, Laurent Ouellette	Nominated	
Prix Jutra/Iris	2024	Best Sound	Humanist Vampire Seeking Consenting Suicidal Person (Vampire humaniste cherche suicidaire consentant) with Marie-Pierre Grenier, Simon Gervais, Thierry Bourgault D'Amico	Won	
Prix Jutra/Iris	2024	Best Sound	Solo with Patrice LeBlanc, Jean Camden	Nominated	
