= 19th Genie Awards =

1999 Canadian film awards ceremony

- Date: February 4, 1999
- Site: Living Arts Centre; Mississauga, Ontario
- Hosted by: Albert Schultz

Highlights
- Best Picture: The Red Violin
- Most nominations: Last Night, Such a Long Journey (12)

Television coverage
- Network: CBC Television

The 19th Genie Awards were held, by the Academy of Canadian Cinema & Television, on February 4, 1999 to honour Canadian films released in 1998. It marked only the second time in the 1990s, after the 16th Genie Awards in January 1996, that the awards were held in the winter of the year following the year in which eligible films were released, rather than the late fall of the same year; the awards have since retained the winter scheduling. The ceremony was once again aired on CBC Television, and a post-event highlights show aired on Radio Canada.

When the nominees were announced, many were surprised that four of the five nominees for Best Motion Picture were international co-productions, and there was discussion about whether the films were Canadian. Many people didn't realize that co-production was now a key component of film production in Canada, and that Canada had co-production treaties with 52 countries.

This year's ceremony, which was hosted by actor Albert Schultz, was dominated by Last Night and Such a Long Journey, which both received 12 nominations. However, The Red Violin won the most awards, with eight wins including Best Picture.

== Award winners and nominees ==
Motion Picture	Direction
The Red Violin — Niv Fichman; Last Night — Daniel Iron and Niv Fichman; Regeneration — Allan Scott and Peter Simpson; Rupert's Land — Bill Thumm and Scott Kennedy; Such a Long Journey — Paul Stephens and Simon MacCorkindale	François Girard, The Red Violin; Don McKellar, Last Night; J. H. Wyman, Pale Saints; Gillies MacKinnon, Regeneration; Jonathan Tammuz, Rupert's Land; Sturla Gunnarsson, Such a Long Journey
Actor in a leading role	Actress in a leading role
Roshan Seth, Such a Long Journey; Rémy Girard, Les Boys; Tony Nardi, Mr. Aiello (La Déroute); Jonathan Pryce, Regeneration; Samuel West, Rupert's Land	Sandra Oh, Last Night; Anne-Marie Cadieux, Nô; Pascale Montpetit, Streetheart (Le Cœur au poing); Ginette Reno, It's Your Turn, Laura Cadieux (C't'à ton tour, Laura Cadieux); Pierrette Robitaille, It's Your Turn, Laura Cadieux (C't'à ton tour, Laura Cadieux)
Actor in a supporting role	Actress in a supporting role
Callum Keith Rennie, Last Night; Kurush Deboo, Such a Long Journey; Michael Riley, Pale Saints; Saul Rubinek, Pale Saints; George Wendt, Rupert's Land	Monique Mercure, Conquest; Geneviève Bujold, Last Night; Rachael Crawford, Pale Saints; Anna Henry, The Fishing Trip; Roberta Maxwell, Last Night
Best Feature Length Documentary	Best Short Documentary
Betsy Carson, Kirk Tougas and Nettie Wild, A Place Called Chiapas; Jennifer Baichwal and Nicholas de Pencier, Let It Come Down: The Life of Paul Bowles; Peter Lynch and Peter Starr, The Herd	Anita Herczeg and Brenda Longfellow, Shadow Maker: Gwendolyn MacEwen, Poet; Brian Nash and Elizabeth Yake, bp: pushing the boundaries; Elizabeth Yake and Lara Fitzgerald, Remembering Memory
Best Live Action Short Drama	Best Animated Short
Mary Lewis, When Ponds Freeze Over; Leah Mallen and Mark Sawers, Shoes Off!; Bruce McDonald, Sandy Kaplansky, Don McKellar and Michael Ondaatje, Elimination Dance; Sylvie Rosenthal, The Chocolate Bomb (La bombe au chocolat); Julie Trimingham and Ric Kokotovich, Claire	Andy Jones, Chris Landreth and Kevin Tureski, Bingo; John Weldon and Marcy Page, Frank the Wrabbit
Art Direction/Production Design	Cinematography
François Séguin, The Red Violin; Nitin Chandrakant Desai, Such a Long Journey; John Dondertman and Patricia Cuccia, Last Night; Andy Harris, Regeneration; Jasna Stefanovic, Cube	Alain Dostie, The Red Violin; Jan Kiesser, Such a Long Journey; Douglas Koch, Last Night; Glen MacPherson, Regeneration; Gregory Middleton, The Falling
Costume Design	Editing
Renée April, The Red Violin; Lovleen Bains, Such a Long Journey; Kate Carin, Regeneration; Daniel Lalande, Streetheart (Le Cœur au poing); Marie-Chantale Vaillancourt, Nô; Tamara Winston, Pale Saints	Jeff Warren, Such a Long Journey; Pia Di Ciaula, Regeneration; Reginald Harkema, Last Night; Gaétan Huot, The Red Violin; John Sanders, Cube
Overall Sound	Sound Editing
Claude La Haye, Jo Caron, Bernard Gariépy Strobl and Hans Peter Strobl, The Red Violin; Henry Embry, Steph Carrier, Lou Solakofski and Orest Sushko, Such a Long Journey; Darcy Kite, Peter Kelly, Steve McNamee and Todd Warren, Cube; Louis Kramer, Todd Beckett, Tim O'Connell and Scott Purdy, Regeneration; John J. Thomson, Dean Giammarco, Miguel Nunes and Paul A. Sharpe, Last Night	David Evans, Richard Cadger, Donna Powell, Paul Shikata, Phong Tran and Clive Turner, Such a Long Journey; Sue Conley, Stephen Barden, Craig Henighan, John Laing, Jill Purdy and John Sievert, Cube; Jacqueline Cristianini, James Fonnyadt, Adam Gejdos, James Genn, Kirby Jinnah and Cam Wagner, Rupert's Land; Tony Currie, Paula Fairfield, Alastair Gray and John Sievert, Regeneration; Marcel Pothier, Jérôme Décarie, Carole Gagnon, Antoine Morin and Jacques Plante, The Red Violin
Achievement in Music: Original Score	Achievement in Music: Original Song
John Corigliano, The Red Violin; Mychael Danna, Regeneration; Jonathan Goldsmith, Such a Long Journey; Mark Korven, Cube; Alex Pauk and Alexina Louie, Last Night	Suzie Ungerleider, "River Blue" — The Fishing Trip; François Dompierre and Michel Tremblay, "Laura la Belle" — It's Your Turn, Laura Cadieux (C't'à ton tour, Laura Cadieux); Claude Gauthier and Daniel Lavoie, "Est-ce si loin Québec" — Now or Never (Aujourd'hui ou jamais)
Screenplay	Special awards
Don McKellar and François Girard, The Red Violin; Don McKellar, Last Night; André Morency and Robert Lepage, Nô; Allan Scott, Regeneration; Sooni Taraporevala, Such a Long Journey	Claude Jutra Award: Don McKellar, Last Night; Golden Reel Award: Les Boys
