= Prix Iris for Best Sound =

Annual Canadian film award

The Prix Iris for Best Sound (French: Prix Iris du meilleur son) is an annual film award presented by Québec Cinéma as part of the Prix Iris awards program, to honour the year's best sound in feature films made within the Cinema of Quebec. Unlike some film awards, Québec Cinéma does not present separate awards for overall sound and sound editing, but instead honours the full sound team in a single category; however it does also present a distinct category for Best Sound in a Documentary.

Until 2016, it was known as the Jutra Award for Best Sound in memory of influential Quebec film director Claude Jutra. Following the withdrawal of Jutra's name from the award, the 2016 award was presented under the name Québec Cinéma. The Prix Iris name was announced in October 2016.

Re-recording mixer Bernard Gariépy Strobl received the most nominations, twenty-eight, while sound mixer Luc Boudrias and sound editor Sylvain Bellemare were nominated twenty-three and twenty times respectively, making them the only three persons to receive twenty nominations or more in a single category.

When combining his nominations for Best Sound in a Documentary, Bernard Gariépy Strobl reaches thirty nominations, making him the second most nominated person at the Prix Iris behind Xavier Dolan who received thirty-one nominations. Gariépy Strobl is the only person to win ten awards in a single category and is also only second to Dolan in total wins, with Dolan scoring fifteen awards across multiple categories.

== 1990s ==
Year	Sound team	Film	Ref
1999; 1st Jutra Awards
1999; 1st Jutra Awards	Claude La Haye, Marcel Pothier, Hans Peter Strobl, Guy Pelletier	The Red Violin (Le Violon rouge)	
1999; 1st Jutra Awards	Yvon Benoît, Martin Pinsonnault, Hans Peter Strobl, Louis Hone	2 Seconds (2 secondes)	
1999; 1st Jutra Awards	Serge Beauchemin, Viateur Paiement, Louis Gignac	It's Your Turn, Laura Cadieux (C't'à ton tour, Laura Cadieux)	
1999; 1st Jutra Awards	Michel Charron, Claude Beaugrand, Hans Peter Strobl	Streetheart (Le Cœur au poing)	

== 2000s ==
Year	Sound team	Film	Ref
2000; 2nd Jutra Awards
2000; 2nd Jutra Awards	Normand Mercier, Claude Beaugrand, Hans Peter Strobl, Louis Hone	Winter Stories (Histoires d'hiver)	
2000; 2nd Jutra Awards	Serge Beauchemin, Louis Dupire, Hans Peter Strobl, Jo Caron	Memories Unlocked (Souvenirs intimes)	
2000; 2nd Jutra Awards	Michel Charron, Jo Caron, Bruno Ruffolo, Louis Dupire, Michel Descombes, Gavin Fernandes	The Last Breath (Le Dernier Souffle)	
2000; 2nd Jutra Awards	Bobby O'Malley, Dominique Delguste, Réjean Juteau	Four Days	
2001; 3rd Jutra Awards
2001; 3rd Jutra Awards	Gilles Corbeil, Mathieu Beaudin, Louis Gignac	Maelström	
2001; 3rd Jutra Awards	Dominik Pagacz	The Orphan Muses (Les Muses orphelines)	
2001; 3rd Jutra Awards	Dominique Delguste	Hochelaga	
2001; 3rd Jutra Awards	Claude La Haye, Michel Pothier	Stardom	
2002; 4th Jutra Awards
2002; 4th Jutra Awards	Mathieu Beaudin, Serge Beauchemin, Hans Peter Strobl, Louis Gignac	February 15, 1839 (15 février 1839)	
2002; 4th Jutra Awards	Dominique Chartrand, Marcel Pothier, Luc Boudrias	A Girl at the Window (Une jeune fille à la fenêtre)	
2002; 4th Jutra Awards	Gilles Corbeil, Sylvain Bellemare, Louis Gignac	Soft Shell Man (Un crabe dans la tête)	
2002; 4th Jutra Awards	Claude La Haye, Marie-Claude Gagné, Gavin Fernandes	Wedding Night (Nuit de noces)	
2003; 5th Jutra Awards
2003; 5th Jutra Awards	Patrick Rousseau, Claude Beaugrand, Hans Peter Strobl, Bernard Gariépy Strobl	Séraphin: Heart of Stone (Séraphin: un homme et son péché)	
2003; 5th Jutra Awards	Serge Beauchemin, Louis Dupire, Hans Peter Strobl, Bernard Gariépy Strobl	The Collector (Le collectionneur)	
2003; 5th Jutra Awards	Yvon Benoît, Marie-Claude Gagné, Gavin Fernandes	Alice's Odyssey (L'Odyssée d'Alice Tremblay)	
2003; 5th Jutra Awards	Bobby O'Malley, Denis Saindon, Gavin Fernandes. Philippe Pelletier	Inside (Histoire de pen)	
2004; 6th Jutra Awards
2004; 6th Jutra Awards	Claude Hazanavicius, Marcel Pothier, Michel Descombes	Seducing Doctor Lewis (La Grande séduction)	
2004; 6th Jutra Awards	Gilles Corbeil, Hans Peter Strobl, Louis Collin	Gaz Bar Blues	
2004; 6th Jutra Awards	Louis Hone	Evil Words (Sur le seuil)	
2004; 6th Jutra Awards	Patrick Rousseau, Michel Descombes, Gavin Fernandes, Marie-Claude Gagné	The Barbarian Invasions (Les Invasions barbares)	
2005; 7th Jutra Awards
2005; 7th Jutra Awards	Don Cohen, Marie-Claude Gagné, Michel Descombes	Bittersweet Memories (Ma vie en cinémascope)	
2005; 7th Jutra Awards	Serge Bouvier, Simon Brien, Martin Pinsonnault, Clovis Gouaillier	White Skin (La Peau blanche)	
2005; 7th Jutra Awards	Dominique Chartrand, Christian Rivest, Gavin Fernandes, Pierre Paquet	The Last Tunnel (Le Dernier tunnel)	
2005; 7th Jutra Awards	Claude La Haye, Colin Miller, Adrian Rhodes	Battle of the Brave (Nouvelle-France)	
2006; 8th Jutra Awards
2006; 8th Jutra Awards	Yvon Benoît, Daniel Bisson, Luc Boudrias, Bernard Gariépy Strobl, Mira Mailhot, Simon Meilleur, Mireille Morin, Martin Pinsonnault, Jean-François Sauvé	C.R.A.Z.Y.	
2006; 8th Jutra Awards	Pierre Bertrand, Sylvain Bellemare, Louis Gignac	Familia	
2006; 8th Jutra Awards	Dominique Chartrand, Olivier Calvert, Hans Peter Strobl	Audition (L'Audition)	
2006; 8th Jutra Awards	Claude Hazanavicius, Claude Beaugrand, Luc Boudrias, Bernard Gariépy Strobl	The Rocket (Maurice Richard)	
2007; 9th Jutra Awards
2007; 9th Jutra Awards	Claude La Haye, Hans Peter Strobl, Marie-Claude Gagné	A Sunday in Kigali (Un dimanche à Kigali)	
2007; 9th Jutra Awards	Mario Auclair, Pierre-Jules Audet, Stéphane Bergeron	Cheech	
2007; 9th Jutra Awards	Michel Charron, Louis Dupire, Jean-François Sauvé, Hans Peter Strobl, Bernard Gariépy Strobl	Without Her (Sans elle)	
2007; 9th Jutra Awards	Dominique Chartrand, Christian Rivest, Gavin Fernandes, Pierre Paquet	Bon Cop, Bad Cop	
2007; 9th Jutra Awards	Normand Mercier, Michel B. Bordeleau, Geoffrey Mitchell	Family History (Histoire de famille)	
2008; 10th Jutra Awards
2008; 10th Jutra Awards	Claude La Haye, Claude Beaugrand, Hans Peter Strobl, Bernard Gariepy Strobl	Silk	
2008; 10th Jutra Awards	Pierre Bertrand, Sylvain Bellemare, Bernard Gariépy Strobl	Continental, a Film Without Guns (Continental, un film sans fusil)	
2008; 10th Jutra Awards	Simon Poudrette	Taking the Plunge (À vos marques... party!)	
2008; 10th Jutra Awards	Patrick Rousseau, Marcel Pothier, Gavin Fernandes, Stéphane Bergeron	My Daughter, My Angel (Ma fille, mon ange)	
2009; 11th Jutra Awards
2009; 11th Jutra Awards	Dominique Chartrand, Olivier Calvert, Louis Gignac, Gavin Fernandes	Babine	
2009; 11th Jutra Awards	Michel Lecoufle, Olivier Calvert, Stéphane Bergeron	Everything Is Fine (Tout est parfait)	
2009; 11th Jutra Awards	Patrick Rousseau, Marie-Claude Gagne, Louis Gignac	Honey, I'm in Love (Le Grand Départ)	
2009; 11th Jutra Awards	Tod Vandyk, Peter Lopata, Jean-Philippe Espantoso	Who Is KK Downey?	

== 2010s ==
Year	Sound team	Film	Ref
2010; 12th Jutra Awards
2010; 12th Jutra Awards	Pierre Blain, Claude Beaugrand, Stéphane Bergeron	Polytechnique	
2010; 12th Jutra Awards	Mario Auclair, Christian Rivest, Sylvain Lefebvre, Michel Gauvin	Cadavres	
2010; 12th Jutra Awards	Mario Auclair, Pierre-Jules Audet, Luc Boudrias, Louis Gignac	The Master Key (Grande Ourse, la clé des possibles)	
2010; 12th Jutra Awards	Marcel Chouinard, Richard Lavoie, Dean Giammarco, Bill Sheppard	The Timekeeper (L'Heure de vérité)	
2010; 12th Jutra Awards	Dominik Pagacz, Gavin Fernandes	Angel at Sea (Un ange à la mer)	
2011; 13th Jutra Awards
2011; 13th Jutra Awards	Sylvain Bellemare, Jean Umansky, Jean Pierre Laforce	Incendies	
2011; 13th Jutra Awards	Martin Desmarais, Luc Mandeville, Dominique Delguste	The Comeback (Cabotins)	
2011; 13th Jutra Awards	Marie-Claude Gagné, Louis Gignac, Patrick Rousseau	Oscar and the Lady in Pink (Oscar et la dame rose)	
2011; 13th Jutra Awards	Michel Lecoufle, Pierre-Jules Audet, Luc Boudrias	7 Days (Les 7 Jours du Talion)	
2011; 13th Jutra Awards	Simon Poudrette, Christian Rivest, Stéphane Bergeron, Isabelle Lussier	File 13 (Filière 13)	
2012; 14th Jutra Awards
2012; 14th Jutra Awards	Pierre Bertrand, Mathieu Beaudin, Sylvain Bellemare, Bernard Gariepy Strobl	Monsieur Lazhar	
2012; 14th Jutra Awards	Mario Auclair, Pierre-Jules Audet, Luc Boudrias	Fear of Water (La Peur de l'eau)	
2012; 14th Jutra Awards	Pierre-Jules Audet, Arnaud Derimay, Bernard Gariépy Strobl	Starbuck	
2012; 14th Jutra Awards	Sylvain Bellemare, Pierre Bertrand, Bernard Gariépy Strobl	Familiar Grounds (En terrains connus)	
2012; 14th Jutra Awards	Yann Cleary, Claude Beaugrand, Stéphane Bergeron	Wetlands (Marécages)	
2013; 15th Jutra Awards
2013; 15th Jutra Awards	Claude La Haye, Martin Pinsonnault, Bernard Gariépy Strobl	War Witch (Rebelle)	
2013; 15th Jutra Awards	Pierre-Jules Audet, Luc Boudrias, Michel Lecoufle	L'Affaire Dumont	
2013; 15th Jutra Awards	Pascal Beaudin, Luc Boudrias, Olivier Calvert	Mars and April (Mars et Avril)	
2013; 15th Jutra Awards	Sylvain Bellemare, Jean-Paul Hurier, Jean Umansky	Inch'Allah	
2013; 15th Jutra Awards	Luc Boudrias, Marcel Chouinard, Patrice Leblanc	The Torrent (Le Torrent)	
2014; 16th Jutra Awards
2014; 16th Jutra Awards	Stéphane Bergeron, Martin Pinsonnault, Simon Poudrette	Louis Cyr	
2014; 16th Jutra Awards	Sylvain Bellemare, Pierre Bertrand, Bernard Gariépy Strobl	Gabrielle	
2014; 16th Jutra Awards	Jérôme Boiteau	The Legend of Sarila (La Légende de Sarila)	
2014; 16th Jutra Awards	Michel B. Bordeleau, Frédéric de Ravignan, Gavin Fernandes	Jappeloup (Jappeloup, l'étoffe d'un champion)	
2014; 16th Jutra Awards	Yann Cleary, Martin Rouillard	Hunting the Northern Godard (La Chasse au Godard d'Abbittibbi)	
2015; 17th Jutra Awards
2015; 17th Jutra Awards	Sylvain Bellemare, Pierre Bertrand, Bernard Gariépy Strobl	You're Sleeping Nicole (Tu dors Nicole)	
2015; 17th Jutra Awards	Mario Auclair, Stéphane Bergeron, Marcel Pothier, Christian Rivest	The Little Queen (La petite reine)	
2015; 17th Jutra Awards	Bruno Bélanger, Louis Collin, Bernard Gariépy Strobl, Robert Morin	3 Indian Tales (3 histoires d'Indiens)	
2015; 17th Jutra Awards	Olivier Calvert, Clovis Gouaillier, Sylvain Vary	Arwad	
2015; 17th Jutra Awards	Eric Ladouceur, Luc Mandeville, Lynne Trépanier	Uvanga	
2016; 18th Quebec Cinema Awards
2016; 18th Quebec Cinema Awards	Raymond Vermette, Christian Rivest, Stéphane Bergeron, Julie Dufour, Guy Pelletier	Snowtime! (La guerre des tuques 3D)	
2016; 18th Quebec Cinema Awards	François Grenon, Sylvain Bellemare, Luc Boudrias	The Sound of Trees (Le bruit des arbres)	
2016; 18th Quebec Cinema Awards	Claude La Haye, Patrice Leblanc, Bernard Gariépy Strobl	Corbo	
2016; 18th Quebec Cinema Awards	Claude La Haye, Claude Beaugrand, Luc Boudrias, Patrick Lalonde	Elephant Song	
2016; 18th Quebec Cinema Awards	Claude La Haye, Sylvain Bellemare, Bernard Gariépy Strobl	My Internship in Canada (Guibord s'en va-t-en guerre)	
2017; 19th Quebec Cinema Awards
2017; 19th Quebec Cinema Awards	Claude Beaugrand, Bernard Gariépy Strobl, Claude La Haye	Two Lovers and a Bear	
2017; 19th Quebec Cinema Awards	Pierre-Jules Audet, Luc Boudrias, Claude La Haye	Race	
2017; 19th Quebec Cinema Awards	Sylvain Bellemare, Stéphane Bergeron, Martyne Morin	Before the Streets (Avant les rues)	
2017; 19th Quebec Cinema Awards	Stéphane Bergeron, Martin Desmarais, Marie-Claude Gagné	Nitro Rush	
2017; 19th Quebec Cinema Awards	Olivier Calvert, Stephen De Oliveira, Hans Laitres	Shambles (Maudite poutine)	
2018; 20th Quebec Cinema Awards
2018; 20th Quebec Cinema Awards	Jean-Sébastien Beaudoin Gagnon, Stéphane Bergeron, Olivier Calvert	Ravenous (Les Affamés)	
2018; 20th Quebec Cinema Awards	Jean-Sébastien Beaudoin Gagnon, Sylvain Bellemare, Hans Laitres	All You Can Eat Buddha	
2018; 20th Quebec Cinema Awards	Claude Beaugrand, Bernard Gariépy Strobl, Claude La Haye	Hochelaga, Land of Souls (Hochelaga, terre des âmes)	
2018; 20th Quebec Cinema Awards	Martin C. Desmarais, Gavin Fernandes, Marie-Claude Gagné, Louis Gignac	Bon Cop, Bad Cop 2	
2018; 20th Quebec Cinema Awards	Clovis Gouaillier, Philippe Lavigne, Patrice LeBlanc	The Little Girl Who Was Too Fond of Matches (La petite fille qui aimait trop les allumettes)	
2019; 21st Quebec Cinema Awards
2019; 21st Quebec Cinema Awards	Claude Beaugrand, Michel B. Bordeleau, Luc Boudrias, Gilles Corbeil	La Bolduc	
2019; 21st Quebec Cinema Awards	Mimi Allard, Sylvain Bellemare, Bernard Gariépy Strobl, Claude La Haye	Allure	
2019; 21st Quebec Cinema Awards	Stéphane Bergeron, Olivier Calvert, Gilles Corbeil	The Fireflies Are Gone (La disparition des lucioles)	
2019; 21st Quebec Cinema Awards	Luc Boudrias, Frédéric Cloutier, Stephen De Oliveira	The Great Darkened Days (La grande noirceur)	
2019; 21st Quebec Cinema Awards	Sylvain Brassard, Michel Lecoufle	1991	

== 2020s ==
Year	Sound team	Film	Ref
2020; 22nd Quebec Cinema Awards
2020; 22nd Quebec Cinema Awards	Sylvain Bellemare, Jo Caron, Dominique Lacour, Bernard Gariépy Strobl	Sympathy for the Devil (Sympathie pour le diable)	
2020; 22nd Quebec Cinema Awards	Claude Beaugrand, Michel B. Bordeleau, Bernard Gariépy Strobl, Claude La Haye, Raymond Legault	The Song of Names	
2020; 22nd Quebec Cinema Awards	Serge Boivin, Olivier Calvert, Samuel Gagnon-Thibodeau, Roger Guérin	Ville Neuve	
2020; 22nd Quebec Cinema Awards	Luc Boudrias, Sylvain Brassard, Jean Camden	Mafia Inc.	
2020; 22nd Quebec Cinema Awards	Bernard Gariépy Strobl, Sacha Ratcliffe, Lynne Trépanier	The Twentieth Century	
2021; 23rd Quebec Cinema Awards
2021; 23rd Quebec Cinema Awards	Luc Boudrias, Frédéric Cloutier, Patrice LeBlanc	Underground (Souterrain)	
2021; 23rd Quebec Cinema Awards	Pierre-Jules Audet, Emmanuel Croset, Michel Tsagli	Night of the Kings (La nuit des rois)	
2021; 23rd Quebec Cinema Awards	Sylvain Bellemare, Bernard Gariépy Strobl, François Grenon	The Decline (Jusqu'au déclin)	
2021; 23rd Quebec Cinema Awards	Sylvain Bellemare, Paul Col, Bernard Gariépy Strobl, Martyne Morin	Goddess of the Fireflies (La déesse des mouches à feu)	
2021; 23rd Quebec Cinema Awards	Stéphane Bergeron, Olivier Calvert, Martyne Morin	Nadia, Butterfly	
2022; 24th Quebec Cinema Awards
2022; 24th Quebec Cinema Awards	Olivier Calvert, Stephen de Oliveira, Bernard Gariépy Strobl	Drunken Birds (Les oiseaux ivres)	
2022; 24th Quebec Cinema Awards	Stéphane Barsalou, Guillaume Daoust, Jean-François B. Sauvé, Bernard Gariépy Strobl	Bootlegger	
2022; 24th Quebec Cinema Awards	Sylvain Bellemare, Laurent Ouellette, Hans Laitres	Without Havana (Sin La Habana)	
2022; 24th Quebec Cinema Awards	Olivier Calvert, Yann Cleary, Luc Boudrias	The Time Thief (L'arracheuse de temps)	
2022; 24th Quebec Cinema Awards	Gilles Corbeil, Olivier Calvert, Stéphane Bergeron, Bernard Gariépy Strobl	Maria Chapdelaine	
2023; 25th Quebec Cinema Awards
2023; 25th Quebec Cinema Awards	Sylvain Bellemare, Bernard Gariépy Strobl, Pierre Bertrand	Viking	
2023; 25th Quebec Cinema Awards	Olivier Calvert, Luc Boudrias, Yann Cleary	The Dishwasher (Le Plongeur)	
2023; 25th Quebec Cinema Awards	Olivier Calvert, Stéphane Bergeron, Martyne Morin	Red Rooms (Les Chambres rouges)	
2023; 25th Quebec Cinema Awards	Stephen De Oliveira, Séverin Favriau, Stéphane Thiébaut	Falcon Lake	
2023; 25th Quebec Cinema Awards	Daniel Fontaine-Bégin, Luc Boudrias, Henry Godding Jr.	Family Game (Arseneault et fils)	
2024; 26th Quebec Cinema Awards
2024; 26th Quebec Cinema Awards	Marie-Pierre Grenier, Simon Gervais, Luc Boudrias, Thierry Bourgault D'Amico	Humanist Vampire Seeking Consenting Suicidal Person (Vampire humaniste cherche suicidaire consentant)	
2024; 26th Quebec Cinema Awards	Sylvain Bellemare, Luc Boudrias, François Goupil, Stephen De Oliveira	Days of Happiness (Les Jours heureux)	
2024; 26th Quebec Cinema Awards	Samuel Gagnon-Thibodeau, Luc Boudrias, Laurent Ouellette	Hunting Daze (Jour de chasse)	
2024; 26th Quebec Cinema Awards	François Grenon, Julien Roig, Olivier Guillaume	The Nature of Love (Simple comme Sylvain)	
2024; 26th Quebec Cinema Awards	Patrice LeBlanc, Luc Boudrias, Jean Camden	Solo	
2025; 27th Quebec Cinema Awards
2025; 27th Quebec Cinema Awards	Olivier Calvert, Stephen De Oliveira, Hans Laitres	Shepherds (Bergers)	
2025; 27th Quebec Cinema Awards	Jean-Sébastien Beaudoin-Gagnon, Simon Gervais, Bernard Gariépy Strobl	Vile & Miserable (Vil & Misérable)	
2025; 27th Quebec Cinema Awards	Sylvain Bellemare, Stephen De Oliveira, Luc Boudrias	Two Women (Deux femmes en or)	
2025; 27th Quebec Cinema Awards	Sylvain Brassard, Stephen De Oliveira	Peak Everything (Amour apocalypse)	
2025; 27th Quebec Cinema Awards	Pablo Villegas, Sacha Ratcliffe, Bernard Gariépy Strobl	Universal Language (Une langue universelle)	

== Multiple wins and nominations ==
=== Multiple wins ===
Wins	Technician
10	Bernard Gariépy Strobl
6	Claude Beaugrand
6	Hans Peter Strobl
5	Sylvain Bellemare
5	Claude La Haye
4	Stéphane Bergeron
4	Luc Boudrias
4	Olivier Calvert
3	Mathieu Beaudin
3	Pierre Bertrand
3	Louis Gignac
3	Martin Pinsonnault
2	Gilles Corbeil
2	Stephen De Oliveira
2	Michel Descombes
2	Marie-Claude Gagné
2	Guy Pelletier
2	Marcel Pothier

=== Three or more nominations ===
Nominations	Technician
30	Bernard Gariépy Strobl
24	Luc Boudrias
21	Sylvain Bellemare
16	Stéphane Bergeron
16	Olivier Calvert
15	Claude La Haye
13	Hans Peter Strobl
12	Claude Beaugrand
12	Gavin Fernandes
10	Louis Gignac
9	Marie-Claude Gagné
8	Pierre-Jules Audet
8	Stephen de Oliveira
7	Pierre Bertrand
6	Gilles Corbeil
6	Christian Rivest
5	Mario Auclair
5	Dominique Chartrand
5	Patrice Leblanc
5	Martin Pinsonnault
5	Marcel Pothier
5	Patrick Rousseau
4	Serge Beauchemin
4	Michel B. Bordeleau
4	Yann Cleary
4	Michel Descombes
4	Louis Dupire
4	Hans Laitres
4	Michel Lecoufle
4	Martyne Morin
3	Mathieu Beaudin
3	Jean-Sébastien Beaudoin-Gagnon
3	Yvon Benoît
3	Sylvain Brassard
3	Jo Caron
3	Michel Charron
3	Dominique Delguste
3	Clovis Gouaillier
3	Patrice Leblanc
3	Louis Hone
3	Simon Poudrette
3	Jean-François Sauvé

== Combined totals for Best Sound and Best Sound in a Documentary ==
=== Multiple wins ===
Wins	Technician
10	Bernard Gariépy Strobl
6	Sylvain Bellemare
6	Claude Beaugrand
6	Hans Peter Strobl
5	Claude La Haye
4	Stéphane Bergeron
4	Luc Boudrias
4	Olivier Calvert
3	Mathieu Beaudin
3	Pierre Bertrand
3	Louis Gignac
3	Martin Pinsonnault
2	Gilles Corbeil
2	Stephen De Oliveira
2	Michel Descombes
2	Marie-Claude Gagné
2	Marie-Pierre Grenier
2	Hans Laitres
2	Guy Pelletier
2	Marcel Pothier
2	Jean Paul Vialard

=== Three or more nominations ===
Nominations	Technician
32	Bernard Gariépy Strobl
27	Luc Boudrias
23	Sylvain Bellemare
19	Olivier Calvert
16	Stéphane Bergeron
15	Claude La Haye
14	Claude Beaugrand
13	Hans Peter Strobl
12	Gavin Fernandes
10	Louis Gignac
9	Pierre-Jules Audet
9	Marie-Claude Gagné
8	Stephen de Oliveira
7	Pierre Bertrand
6	Gilles Corbeil
6	Marie-Pierre Grenier
6	Hans Laitres
6	Patrice Leblanc
6	Christian Rivest
6	Jean Paul Vialard
5	Mario Auclair
5	Bruno Bélanger
5	Dominique Chartrand
5	Martin Pinsonnault
5	Marcel Pothier
5	Patrick Rousseau
4	Serge Beauchemin
4	Michel B. Bordeleau
4	Sylvain Brassard
4	Yann Cleary
4	Michel Descombes
4	Louis Dupire
4	Samuel Gagnon-Thibodeau
4	Simon Gervais
4	François Grenon
4	Michel Lecoufle
4	Martyne Morin
4	Jean-François Sauvé
4	Catherine Van Der Donckt
3	Mathieu Beaudin
3	Jean-Sébastien Beaudoin-Gagnon
3	Yvon Benoît
3	Jo Caron
3	Michel Charron
3	Dominique Delguste
3	Olivier Germain
3	Clovis Gouaillier
3	Louis Hone
3	Isabelle Lussier
3	Guy Pelletier
3	Simon Poudrette
3	Sacha Ratcliffe
3	Lynne Trépanier

== See also ==
- Canadian Screen Award for Best Overall Sound
- Canadian Screen Award for Best Sound Editing
