= Hochelaga, Land of Souls =

2017 film by François Girard

- Film poster
- Directed by: François Girard
- Written by: François Girard
- Produced by: Roger Frappier
- Starring: Raoul Max Trujillo
- Cinematography: Nicolas Bolduc
- Edited by: Gaétan Huot
- Music by: Terry Riley; Gyan Riley
- Distributed by: Seville International
- Release date: 6 September 2017
- Running time: 100 minutes
- Country: Canada
- Language: French; English; Mohawk; Algonquin
- Budget: $15 million

Hochelaga, Land of Souls (French: Hochelaga, Terre des âmes) is a 2017 Canadian historical drama film directed and written by François Girard and starring Gilles Renaud, Samian and Tanaya Beatty. Dramatizing several centuries of Quebec history and the local history of Montreal in particular, the story depicts Quebec archaeology revealing the past of indigenous peoples, explorers and 1837 rebels.

Girard had previously used an anthology approach in his films such as The Red Violin, and was interested in another project that would depict Montreal. It was shot in Montreal, with performances in numerous languages. The film was screened in the Gala Presentations section at the 2017 Toronto International Film Festival. It won four Canadian Screen Awards, including Best Cinematography for Nicolas Bolduc, and was Canada's submission for the Academy Award for Best Foreign Language Film, but it was not nominated.

== Plot ==
In the aftermath of a hard-fought battle between Indigenous warriors in 1267, when many Iroquoians were killed on the "Isle of Death", an Iroquois prophet gives the massacre's lone survivor the name Asigny. Centuries later, Asigny's descendant Baptiste Asigny is a graduate student studying Mohawk history. Baptiste struggles to pay rent and obtain research grants while studying under the Université de Montréal archaeology professor Antoine Morin. One night, a rainstorm opens a sinkhole in the field during a game at McGill University's Percival Molson Memorial Stadium, killing one player. Observing the development, Morin theorizes that the sinkhole may lead to evidence of Hochelaga, where French explorer Jacques Cartier contacted Indigenous peoples in Quebec in 1535. Morin obtains an order from the Ministry of Culture to be allowed to dig and hires Baptiste to lead an archaeological excavation of the field.

The archaeologists dig over several days, finding that the "Isle of Death" was the site of a "purple fever" outbreak in 1687. French settler Étienne Maltais is involved in a sexual affair with a native woman named Akwi. He promises her that, next year, he will marry her not before God, but the Great Spirit. She notices sores on his body, which he dismisses as injuries caused by a fall during a hunt. Maltais falls gravely ill of purple fever and is committed to a hospital, where the Catholic chaplain accuses him of sin over fornicating with a "savage". He resolutely orders the priest to stop haranguing him, and later dies.

Baptiste finds that the sinkhole is located over a stream and finds the weapons which he believed could have belonged to Patriote rebels during the Lower Canada Rebellion in 1837. The two Patriotes had fled British loyalist forces led by Colonel Philip Thomas. They came upon the Walker property, though archaeologists note that Mr. Walker had been firmly loyalist. However, the widowed Sarah Walker gives the Patriotes sanctuary. The Patriotes are discovered and killed by the loyalists. Mrs. Walker tells Thomas that due to her advanced age, she does not believe that she will ever go to trial.

At the end of the dig, Baptiste finds the cross of explorer Jacques Cartier, who arrived to Hochelaga in 1535, claiming the land for the Kingdom of France. Cartier met with the chief Tennawake and presented him with the cross. The meeting is peaceful, though Tennawake and his people consider that more Europeans will come to Hochelaga. Cartier names the land Mont Réal (royal mountain). The football team returns to the field, and six years after the sinkhole opened Morin congratulates Baptiste on his research.

== Cast ==
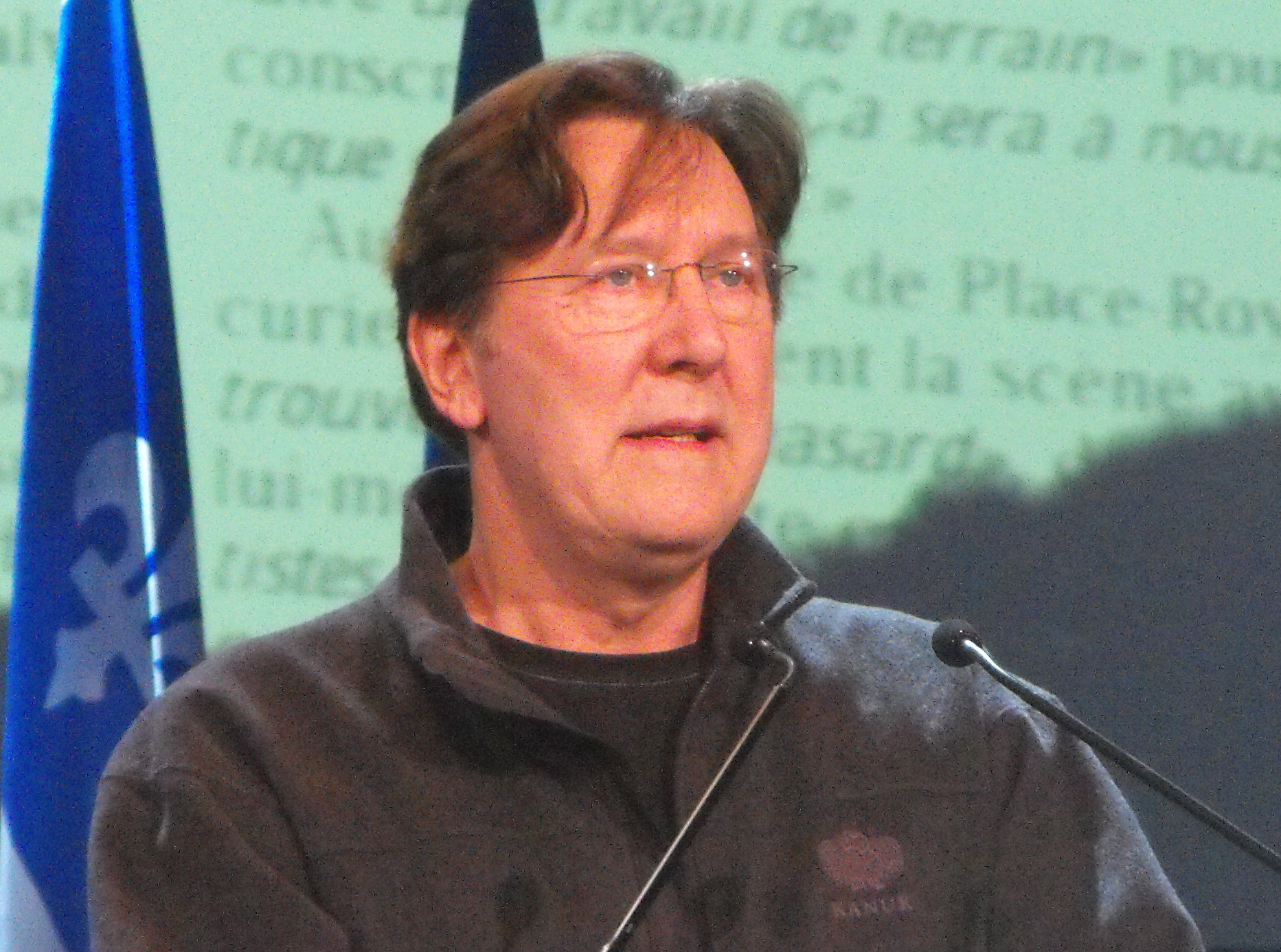
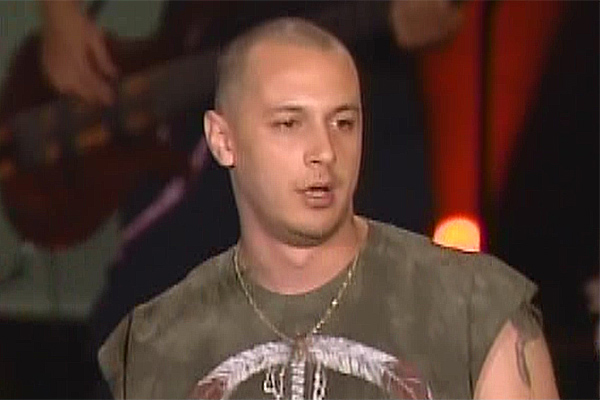
Gilles Renaud and rapper Samian appear in the film.
- Raoul Max Trujillo as Le Prophète
- Tanaya Beatty as Akwi
- David La Haye as Alexis Leblanc
- André Simoneau as Marcus Walker
- Gilles Renaud as Antoine Morin
- Vincent Perez as Jacques Cartier
- Linus Roache as Colonel Philip Thomas
- Roman Blomme as Elie Campeau
- Samuel Tremblay as Baptiste
- Emmanuel Schwartz as Étienne Maltais
- Sian Phillips as Sarah Walker
- Martin Pelletier Jr as Charles Leblanc

== Production ==
=== Development ===
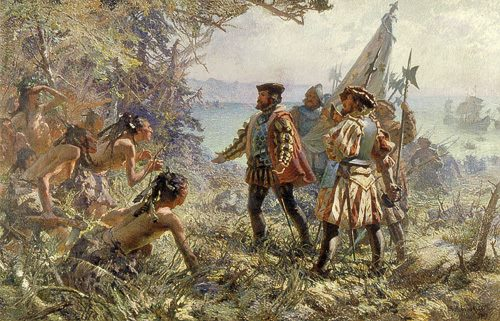
The film portrays Jacques Cartier's 1535 travels, with Vincent Perez as Cartier.

Director François Girard said that the project grew out of his "tremendous affection for Montreal" and a desire to portray it in greater depth than in his 1998 feature The Red Violin. Girard remarked "I grew more and more interested in showing where I live, and pay (sic) tribute to the ancestors who lived there before us". Girard conceived of the story as "spatially extremely limited", and about "waves of immigration", beginning with depictions of Iroquois and Algonquins, and later the French, English and Irish. He stated:

It’s a fantasy most of us have. You’re on a street corner in London, wondering who was standing there 1,000 years before. From my loft in Montreal, I can see Mount Royal. I sometimes have the fantasy that 1,000, 2,000 or 3,000 years ago, somebody was in the same place, looking at the same mountain, the same sky, feeling the same winter. We have that connection by the land. That’s what the film talks about, looking at whoever has occupied that land, and then the connection between them.

Historic episodes that inspired the story included the explorations of Jacques Cartier in 1535, the 1837 Lower Canada Rebellion and 1944 operations in the Montreal Neurological Institute and Hospital. Other incidents, such as the 1267 battle and the Iroquois prophet played by Trujillo, were invented. The project required performances in French, English, Mohawk, Algonquin, Latin and Arabic. Native leader Dominique Rankin served as a consultant. Other historical research required included a study on the evolution of the French language.

Producer Roger Frappier supported the project with a budget of $15 million, calling it his most complicated. Frappier cited the project as important, and as Girard's return to the form of The Red Violin and Thirty Two Short Films About Glenn Gould, but more locally based. While beginning to work on the screenplay, Girard was collaborating with composer Terry Riley and Terry's son Gyan Riley, also a musician, on developing a score, to assist the spiritual aspects of the story. On 26 April 2016, Telefilm Canada announced $17 million in grants for 17 projects, including Girard's film, announced as a historical drama and starring Emmanuel Schwartz and Yvan Attal.

=== Casting ===
In casting, artistic director André Dudemaine claimed that the Quebec film industry was skeptical of the project finding Indigenous actors, saying there were not enough in Montreal. The 1990 Oka Crisis also left lasting distrust between communities. George Wahiakeron Gilbert helped the actors learn Mohawk lines, and also performed a chief in the Cartier scene. Trujillo embraced the project for its authenticity.

Swiss actor Vincent Perez assumed the role of Jacques Cartier in October 2016, citing his interest in the 16th century and in visiting Quebec. The Algonquin rapper Samian (Samuel Tremblay) was cast in his first prominent performance in a film. Karelle Tremblay also had a role as Soeur Beatrice.

=== Filming ===
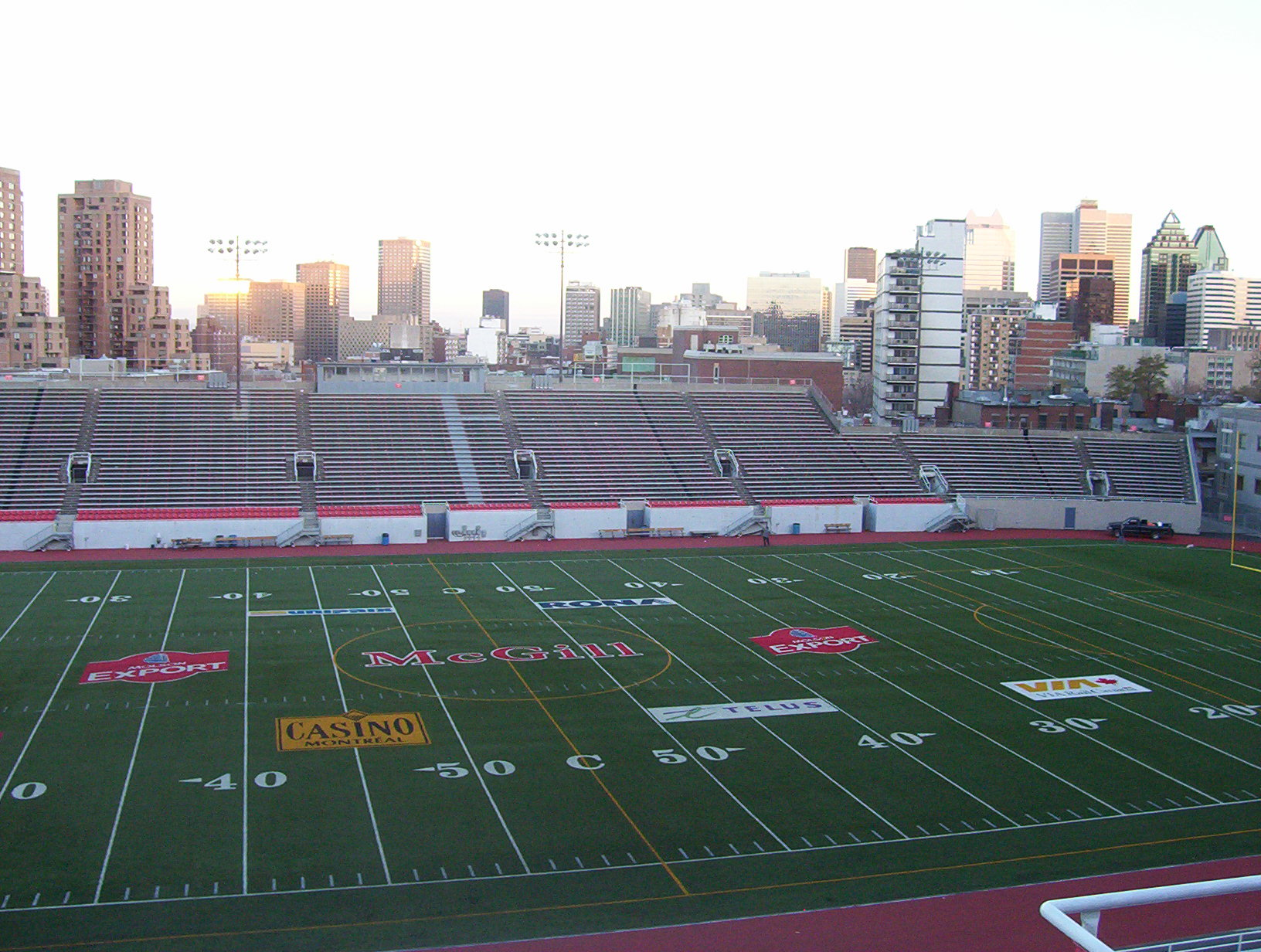
Scenes were shot at Percival Molson Memorial Stadium.

Principal photography began on 15 September 2016 and was expected to last 42 days, employing thousands of extras. All 300 extras playing Indigenous characters were portrayed by Indigenous people. Filming continued in Montreal in October 2016 to February 2017. The initial football scenes were shot at Percival Molson Memorial Stadium. Rainstorms delayed some production.

== Release ==
In February 2017, Seville International adopted the film for distribution. It was also selected for the Gala Presentations section at the 2017 Toronto International Film Festival. Festival organizers chose it for screening at the 22nd Busan International Film Festival in October 2017. At Camerimage in October 2017, Nicolas Bolduc competed for the Golden Frog Award.

Hochelaga, Land of Souls premiered in Montreal at the Place des Arts on 6 September 2017, before TIFF. The event marked Montreal's 375th anniversary and commemorations of the 150th anniversary of Canada. A second screening that night at the Imperial theatre was attended by prominent Quebecois cultural figures Denis Villeneuve, Gilles Vigneault and Luc Plamondon, along with a speech by Ghislain Picard, the Assembly of First Nations of Quebec leader. While TIFF organizers would ordinarily wish to ensure a gala screening would be the premiere, Girard said president Piers Handling was sympathetic to Montreal seeing it first, given the subject matter.

Before 25 September, the film was screening in Medicine Hat, Alberta in order for it to be eligible for the Academy Award for Best Foreign Language Film. A full theatrical release was planned for later in fall 2017.

== Reception ==
=== Critical response ===
In La Presse, Mario Girard hailed Hochelaga, Land of Souls as powerful and a meaningful way to mark Montreal's 375th anniversary. Girard especially cited its depiction of Indigenous peoples in Quebec. For Le Devoir, Odile Tremblay praised the film as beautiful and a story of reconciliation, giving fair weight to different sociological nations. Franco Nuovo of Radio-Canada described being overwhelmed by Hochelaga, comparing the cinematography to paintings and finding the abundant symbolism erased any dullness that the historic subject matter could have threatened.

Dennis Harvey wrote in Variety that the film was "a worthy return to the strengths and ambitions of Thirty Two Short Films About Glenn Gould and The Red Violin". The Hollywood Reporter's John DeFore called the screenplay episodic and found hints the film suggests a vision of "all the region's inhabitants as a single human population".

=== Accolades ===
Hochelaga, Land of Souls was selected as the Canadian entry for the Best Foreign Language Film at the 90th Academy Awards. Despite showings in Los Angeles for the Academy, it was not shortlisted or nominated. It was also submitted to the Hollywood Foreign Press Association for consideration of a Golden Globe for Best Foreign Language Film nomination.

Award	Date of ceremony	Category	Recipient(s)	Result	Ref(s)
Canadian Screen Awards	11 March 2018	Best Art Direction / Production Design	François Séguin	Won	
Canadian Screen Awards	11 March 2018	Best Cinematography	Nicolas Bolduc	Won	
Canadian Screen Awards	11 March 2018	Best Costume Design	Mario Davignon	Nominated	
Canadian Screen Awards	11 March 2018	Best Score	Terry Riley and Gyan Riley	Nominated	
Canadian Screen Awards	11 March 2018	Best Sound	Claude La Haye and Bernard Gariépy Strobl	Won	
Canadian Screen Awards	11 March 2018	Best Sound Editing	Claude Beaugrand	Nominated	
Canadian Screen Awards	11 March 2018	Best Make-Up	Kathryn Casault	Nominated	
Canadian Screen Awards	11 March 2018	Best Visual Effects	Alain Lachance, Yann Jouannic, Hugo Léveillé, Nadège Bozetti, Antonin Messier-Turcotte, Thibault Deloof and Francis Bernard	Won	
Canadian Society of Cinematographers	14 April 2018	Theatrical Feature Cinematography	Nicolas Bolduc	Won	
Prix Iris	3 June 2018	Best Supporting Actor	Emmanuel Schwartz	Won	
Prix Iris	3 June 2018	Best Cinematography	Nicolas Bolduc	Won	
Prix Iris	3 June 2018	Best Art Direction	François Séguin	Won	
Prix Iris	3 June 2018	Best Costume Design	Mario Davignon	Won	
Prix Iris	3 June 2018	Best Score	Terry Riley and Gyan Riley	Nominated	
Prix Iris	3 June 2018	Best Sound	Claude Beaugrand, Raymond Legault, Jean-Philippe Savard, Claude La Haye and Bernard Gariépy Strobl	Nominated	
Prix Iris	3 June 2018	Best Hair	Réjean Forget, Ann-Louise Landr	Won	
Prix Iris	3 June 2018	Best Make-Up	Kathryn Casault	Nominated	
Prix Iris	3 June 2018	Most Successful Film Outside Quebec	François Girard	Nominated	
Whistler Film Festival	3 December 2017	Best Cinematography Honourable Mention	Nicolas Bolduc	Won	

== See also ==
- List of submissions to the 90th Academy Awards for Best Foreign Language Film
- List of Canadian submissions for the Academy Award for Best Foreign Language Film
