= Jo Caron =

Canadian sound mixer

Jocelyn "Jo" Caron is a Canadian production sound mixer. In 2008, was nominated in the 28th Genie Awards for a Genie Award for Best Achievement in Overall Sound for Shake Hands with the Devil (shared with Eric Fitz, Gavin Fernandes, Benoit Leduc).

== Recognition ==
- 1988 Genie Award for Best Achievement in Sound Editing - Brother André (Le Frère André) - Nominated (shared with Diane Boucher, Viateur Paiement, Marcel Pothier, Antoine Morin)
- 1988 Genie Award for Best Achievement in Overall Sound - The Young Magician - Nominated (shared with Michel Charron, André Gagnon, Michel Descombes)
- 1990 Genie Award for Best Achievement in Overall Sound - Jesus of Montreal (Jésus de Montréal) - Won (shared with Patrick Rousseau, Adrian Croll, Hans Peter Strobl)
- 1991 Genie Award for Best Overall Sound - Moody Beach - Nominated (shared with Michel Descombes, Luc Boudrias, Richard Besse)
- 1991 Genie Award for Best Overall Sound - Love Me (Love-moi) - Nominated (shared with Yvon Benoît, Michel Descombes)
- 1992 Gémeaux Award for Best Overall Sound - Dramatic (Meilleur son d'ensemble: Toutes catégories dramatiques) - Agantuk - Nominated (shared with Michel Descombes, Michel Hinton, Jérôme Décarie, Viateur Paiement)
- 1992 Genie Award for Best Overall Sound - Léolo - Nominated (shared with Yvon Benoît, Jack Jullian, Hans Peter Strobl)
- 1992 Genie Award for Best Overall Sound - Being at Home with Claude - Nominated (shared with Michel Descombes, Michel Charron, Luc Boudrias)
- 1993 Gémeaux Award for Best Overall Sound - Dramatic (Meilleur son d'ensemble: Toutes catégories dramatiques) - Scoop - Nominated (shared with Serge Lacroix, Viateur Paiement, Antoine Morin, Gabor Vadnay)
- 1993 Genie Award for Best Achievement in Overall Sound - The Sex of the Stars (Le Sexe des étoiles) - Won (shared with Hans Peter Strobl, Richard Besse)
- 1994 Gémeaux Award for Best Overall Sound - Dramatic (Meilleur son d'ensemble: Toutes catégories dramatiques) - Les Marchands du silence - Nominated (shared with Martin Pinsonnault, Louis Dupire, Ismael Cordeiro)
- 1994 Gémeaux Award for Best Overall Sound - Dramatic (Meilleur son d'ensemble: Toutes catégories dramatiques) - Scoop III - Nominated (shared with Guy Pelletier, Antoine Morin, Viateur Paiement, Jérôme Décarie)
- 1994 Genie Award for Best Achievement in Overall Sound - Desire in Motion (Mouvements du désir) - Nominated (shared with Hans Künzi, François Musy, Florian Eidenbenz)
- 1996 Genie Award for Best Achievement in Overall Sound - The Confessional (Le Confessionnal) - Nominated (shared with Jean-Claude Laureux, Hans Peter Strobl)
- 1996 Genie Award for Best Achievement in Overall Sound - Polygraph (Le Polygraphe) - Nominated (shared with Claude Hazanavicius, Hans Peter Strobl, John Nestorowich)
- 1997 Genie Award for Best Overall Sound - The Seat of the Soul (Le siège de l'âme) - Nominated (shared with Hans Peter Strobl, Daniel Bisson, Marcel Chouinard)
- 1997 Genie Award for Best Overall Sound - Karmina - Nominated (shared with Luc Boudrias, Don Cohen, Bruno Ruffolo)
- 1997 Genie Award for Best Overall Sound - The Countess of Baton Rouge (La Comtesse de Bâton Rouge) - Nominated (shared with Dominique Chartrand, Hans Peter Strobl)
- Spring 1998 Gemini Award for Best Sound in a Dramatic Program or Series - Hiroshima - Nominated (shared with Viateur Paiement, Mathieu Beaudin, Daniel Bisson, Luc Boudrias, Louis Collin, Jérôme Décarie, Michel Descombes, Carole Gagnon, Antoine Morin, Guy Pelletier, Jacques Plante, Claire Pochon, Myriam Poirier, François B. Senneville)
- 1999 Genie Award for Best Overall Sound - Le Violon Rouge - Won (shared with Claude La Haye, Bernard Gariépy Strobl, Hans Peter Strobl)
- 2000 Genie Award for Best Overall Sound - The Last Breath (Le Dernier souffle) - Nominated (shared with Michel Descombes, Michel Charron, Gavin Fernandes)
- 2001 Genie Award for Best Achievement in Overall Sound - The Art of War - Nominated (Hans Peter Strobl, Don Cohen, Bernard Gariépy Strobl)
- 2002 Genie Award for Best Achievement in Overall Sound - Karmina 2 - Nominated (shared with Luc Boudrias, Yvon Benoît, Benoit Leduc)
- 2005 Genie Award for Best Achievement in Overall Sound - Looking for Alexander (Mémoires affectives) - Nominated (shared with Christian Bouchard, Luc Boudrias, Clovis Gouaillier, Benoit Leduc)
- 2005 Genie Award for Best Achievement in Overall Sound - Head in the Clouds - Nominated (shared with Pierre Blain, Michel Descombes, Gavin Fernandes)
- 2007 Genie Award for Best Achievement in Overall Sound - A Sunday in Kigali - Nominated (shared with Hans Peter Strobl, Claude La Haye, Benoit Leduc, Bernard Gariépy Strobl)
- 2008 Genie Award for Best Achievement in Overall Sound - Shake Hands with the Devil - Nominee (shared with Eric Fitz, Gavin Fernandes, Benoit Leduc)
