= Bernard Gariépy Strobl =

Canadian re-recording sound mixer

Bernard Gariépy Strobl is a Canadian re-recording sound mixer, best known internationally as the supervising re-recording mixer of Arrival (2016), for which he won the BAFTA Award for Best Sound (shared with Claude La Haye and Sylvain Bellemare) and was nominated for the Academy Award for Best Sound Mixing (shared with La Haye). He has been a re-recording mixer on many prominent Quebec films of the last two decades, including The Red Violin (1998), C.R.A.Z.Y. (2005), Monsieur Lazhar (2011), War Witch (2012), Gabrielle (2013), and Endorphine (2015).

His father, Hans Peter Strobl, was also a rerecording mixer in film.

== Awards ==
=== Academy Awards ===
The Academy Awards are a set of awards given by the Academy of Motion Picture Arts and Sciences annually for excellence of cinematic achievements.

| Year | Film | Award | Result | Ref(s) |
|---|---|---|---|---|
| 2017 | Arrival | Best Sound Mixing | Nominated | |

=== British Academy Film Awards ===
The British Academy Film Award is an annual award show presented by the British Academy of Film and Television Arts.

| Year | Film | Award | Result | Ref(s) |
|---|---|---|---|---|
| 2017 | Arrival | Best Sound | Won | |

=== Prix Gémaux ===
The Prix Gémeaux are awards given by the Academy of Canadian Cinema & Television since 1986 to recognize the achievements of Canada's French-language television industry.

| Year | Film | Award | Result | Ref(s) |
|---|---|---|---|---|
| 2002 | Lauzon/Lauzone | Best Overall Sound in an Information/Documentary Program or Series | Won | |
| 2006 | Cirque du Soleil: LoveSick | Best Overall Sound in Documentary/Public Affair/Journalistic/Biography Program or Series | Won | |

=== Gemini Awards ===
The Gemini Awards were awards given by the Academy of Canadian Cinema & Television between 1986 and 2011 to recognize the achievements of Canada's English-language television industry.

| Year | Film | Award | Result | Ref(s) |
|---|---|---|---|---|
| 2006 | Be the Creature | Best Sound in an Information/Documentary Program or Series | Nominated | |
| 2007 | Hunt for Justice | Best Sound in a Dramatic Program | Nominated | |

=== Genie Awards and Canadian Screen Awards ===
The Canadian Screen Awards (French: Les prix Écrans canadiens) are awards given annually by the Academy of Canadian Cinema & Television recognizing excellence in Canadian film, English-language television, and digital media productions. Before 2013, the Academy awarded the Genie Awards.

| Year | Film | Award | Result | Ref(s) |
|---|---|---|---|---|
| 1999 | The Red Violin | Best Overall Sound | Won | |
| 2000 | Memories Unlocked (Souvenirs intimes) | Best Overall Sound | Nominated | |
| 2001 | The Art of War | Best Overall Sound | Nominated | |
| 2002 | A Girl at the Window (Une jeune fille à la fenêtre) | Best Overall Sound | Nominated | |
| 2003 | Les Boys III | Best Overall Sound | Nominated | |
| 2003 | The Collector (Le collectionneur) | Best Overall Sound | Nominated | |
| 2006 | C.R.A.Z.Y. | Best Overall Sound | Won | |
| 2007 | The Rocket (Maurice Richard) | Best Overall Sound | Nominated | |
| 2007 | A Sunday in Kigali (Un dimanche à Kigali) | Best Overall Sound | Nominated | |
| 2008 | Silk | Best Overall Sound | Nominated | |
| 2010 | 5150 Elm's Way (5150, rue des Ormes) | Best Overall Sound | Nominated | |
| 2010 | Love and Savagery | Best Overall Sound | Nominated | |
| 2010 | Before Tomorrow (Le jour avant le lendemain) | Best Overall Sound | Nominated | |
| 2012 | Monsieur Lazhar | Best Overall Sound | Nominated | |
| 2013 | War Witch (Rebelle) | Best Overall Sound | Won | |
| 2014 | Gabrielle | Best Overall Sound | Nominated | |
| 2015 | Meetings with a Young Poet | Best Overall Sound | Nominated | |
| 2016 | Endorphine | Best Overall Sound | Nominated | |
| 2016 | My Internship in Canada (Guibord s'en va-t'en guerre) | Best Overall Sound | Nominated | |
| 2016 | Sol | Best Sound in a non-fiction program or series | Nominated | |
| 2017 | Hochelaga, Land of Souls (Hochelaga terre des âmes) | Best Overall Sound | Won | |
| 2019 | Just a Breath Away (Dans la brume) | Best Overall Sound | Nominated | |
| 2019 | With Love (L'Amour) | Best Overall Sound | Nominated | |
| 2020 | And the Birds Rained Down (Il pleuvait des oiseaux) | Best Overall Sound | Nominated | |
| 2020 | The Song of Names | Best Overall Sound | Won | |
| 2022 | PAW Patrol: The Movie | Best Overall Sound | Nominated | |
| 2023 | Viking | Best Overall Sound | Nominated | |

=== Jutra Awards and Prix Iris ===
Quebec's film awards were formerly known as the Jutra Awards; the Prix Iris name was announced in October 2016.

| Year | Film | Award | Result | Ref(s) |
|---|---|---|---|---|
| 2003 | The Collector (Le collectionneur) | Best Sound | Nominated | |
| 2003 | Séraphin: Heart of Stone (Séraphin : Un homme et son péché) | Best Sound | Won | |
| 2006 | The Rocket (Maurice Richard) | Best Sound | Nominated | |
| 2006 | C.R.A.Z.Y. | Best Sound | Won | |
| 2007 | Without Her (Sans elle) | Best Sound | Nominated | |
| 2008 | Continental, a Film Without Guns (Continental, un film sans fusil) | Best Sound | Nominated | |
| 2008 | Silk (Soie) | Best Sound | Won | |
| 2012 | Starbuck | Best Sound | Nominated | |
| 2012 | Familiar Grounds (En terrains connus) | Best Sound | Nominated | |
| 2012 | Monsieur Lazhar | Best Sound | Won | |
| 2013 | War Witch (Rebelle) | Best Sound | Won | |
| 2014 | Gabrielle | Best Sound | Nominated | |
| 2015 | 3 Indian Tales (3 histoires d'Indiens) | Best Sound | Nominated | |
| 2015 | You're Sleeping Nicole (Tu dors Nicole) | Best Sound | Won | |
| 2016 | My Internship in Canada (Guibord s'en va-t-en guerre) | Best Sound | Nominated | |
| 2016 | Corbo | Best Sound | Nominated | |
| 2017 | Two Lovers and a Bear | Best Sound | Won | |
| 2018 | Hochelaga, Land of Souls (Hochelaga, terre des âmes) | Best Sound | Nominated | |
| 2018 | Far Away Lands (Les terres lointaines) | Best Sound in a Documentary | Nominated | |
| 2019 | Allure | Best Sound | Nominated | |
| 2020 | The Twentieth Century | Best Sound | Nominated | |
| 2020 | The Song of Names | Best Sound | Nominated | |
| 2020 | Sympathy for the Devil (Sympathie pour le diable) | Best Sound | Won | |
| 2021 | Goddess of the Fireflies (La déesse des mouches à feu) | Best Sound | Nominated | |
| 2021 | The Decline (Jusqu'au déclin) | Best Sound | Nominated | |
| 2022 | Bootlegger | Best Sound | Nominated | |
| 2022 | Drunken Birds (Les oiseaux ivres) | Best Sound | Won | |
| 2022 | Maria Chapdelaine | Best Sound | Nominated | |
| 2022 | Big Giant Wave (Comme une vague) | Best Sound in a Documentary | Nominated | |
| 2023 | Viking | Best Sound | Won | |
