= The Red Violin (soundtrack) =

Soundtrack album by John Corigliano
- Released: 1999
- Genre: Classical
- Length: 65:33
- Label: Sony Classical
- Producer: John Corigliano

John Corigliano chronology
Revolution (1985)	The Red Violin (1999)

Professional ratings
Review scores
Source	Rating
Filmtracks.com	4/5 stars
SoundtrackNet	4.5/5 stars
AllMusic	4.5/5 stars

The Red Violin is the original soundtrack album on the Sony Classical label of the 1999 film The Red Violin (original title: Le violon rouge), starring Carlo Cecchi, Sandra Oh and Samuel L. Jackson. The original score and songs were composed by John Corigliano and performed by Philharmonia Orchestra with Esa-Pekka Salonen conducting.

The album won the Academy Award for Best Original Score and was nominated for a Grammy Award for Best Instrumental Composition Written for a Motion Picture, Television or Other Visual Media, but lost to the score of A Bug's Life.

== Composition ==
Film director François Girard stated violinist Joshua Bell and Corigliano were involved from the outset and reviewed every version of the screenplay as it was in development.

Much of the score had to be written before principal photography, which is rare in film. After shooting completed, Corigliano finished "Anna's Theme".

== Track listing ==
No.	Title	Length
1.	"Anna's Theme"	2:50
2.	"Main Title"	2:42
3.	"Death of Anna"	1:44
4.	"Birth of the Red Violin"	3:05
5.	"The Red Violin"	1:34
6.	"The Monastery"	1:06
7.	"Kaspar's Audition; Journey to Vienna"	2:38
8.	"Etudes; Death of Kaspar"	2:38
9.	"The Gypsies; Journey Across Europe"	2:07
10.	"Pope's Gypsy Cadenza"	1:37
11.	"Coitus Musicalis; Victoria's Departure"	4:40
12.	"Pope's Concert"	1:22
13.	"Pope's Betrayal"	3:00
14.	"Journey to China"	4:10
15.	"People's Revolution; Death of Chou Yuan"	3:15
16.	"Morritz Discovers the Red Violin"	3:38
17.	"Morritz's Theme"	1:54
18.	"The Theft"	2:10
19.	"End Titles"	1:46
20.	""The Red Violin" - Chaconne for Violin and Orchestra"	17:37
Total length:		1:05:33
