= Familiar Grounds =

2011 film

- Film poster
- French: En terrains connus
- Directed by: Stéphane Lafleur
- Written by: Stéphane Lafleur
- Produced by: Luc Déry; Kim McCraw
- Starring: Francis La Haye
- Cinematography: Sara Mishara
- Edited by: Sophie Leblond
- Release date: 18 February 2011
- Running time: 90 minutes
- Country: Canada
- Language: French

Familiar Grounds (French: En terrains connus) is a 2011 Canadian drama film directed by Stéphane Lafleur. The film centres on Benoit (Francis La Haye) and Maryse (Fanny Mallette), a brother and sister who embark on a road trip to their family cottage to retrieve a trailer, only to find their lives impacted by the strange prophecies of a salesman (Denis Houle) who claims to be a time-traveller from the future.

== Cast ==
- Francis La Haye as Benoit
- Fanny Mallette as Maryse
- Michel Daigle as André
- Sylvain Marcel as Alain
- Denis Houle as L'Homme du futur
- Suzanne Lemoine as Nathalie

== Critical response ==
Robert Bell of Exclaim! wrote that "even though very little happens, there is something consistently and strangely compelling about Lafleur's sophomore effort. It has to do, in part, with his understanding and perspective of the simple life, as well as his slyly comic framing and intriguing directorial style, which speaks of great things to come."

== Awards ==
The film was the winner of the inaugural Prix collégial du cinéma québécois in 2012.

Sylvain Bellemare, Pierre Bertrand and Bernard Gariépy Strobl received a Jutra Award nomination for Best Sound at the 14th Jutra Awards in 2012.
