= Hans Peter Strobl =

Hans Peter Strobl (January 22, 1942 - July 21, 2007) was an Austrian-Canadian sound engineer in film and television. He was most noted as a five-time Genie Award winner for Best Overall Sound, and a six-time Jutra Award winner for Best Sound.

A native of Vienna, Austria, he began his career as chief recording engineer for the Vienna Symphony. Moving to Canada in 1972 after meeting Louise Gariépy, he began working in film, first with Cinelume and later joining the National Film Board of Canada in 1979. He remained with the NFB until 1991, when his greater interest in working on theatrical features led him to launch his own film recording and production facility, Marko Film, with Jean-Charles Tremblay in 1991.

In 1994, he became the first Canadian recording engineer ever to win all three of Canada's major film and television sound awards in the same year, winning a Genie for The Sex of the Stars (Le Sexe des étoiles), a Gemini Award for the English-language television miniseries The Boys of St. Vincent and a Gémeaux Award for the French-language television miniseries Shehaweh.

He died in 2007, having worked on over 400 films over the course of his career. He had two sons, re-recording sound mixer Bernard Gariépy Strobl and Cirque du Soleil engineer Olivier Gariépy.

== Awards ==
Award	Year	Category	Film	Result	Ref(s)
Genie Awards	5th Genie Awards	Best Overall Sound	The Wars	Nominated	
Genie Awards	6th Genie Awards	Best Overall Sound	Mario	Won	
Genie Awards	9th Genie Awards	Best Overall Sound	Night Zoo (Un zoo la nuit)	Won	
Genie Awards	11th Genie Awards	Best Overall Sound	Jesus of Montreal (Jésus de Montréal)	Won	
Genie Awards	13th Genie Awards	Best Overall Sound	Léolo	Nominated	
Genie Awards	14th Genie Awards	Best Overall Sound	The Sex of the Stars (Le Sexe des étoiles)	Won	
Genie Awards	15th Genie Awards	Best Overall Sound	Matusalem	Nominated	
Genie Awards	16th Genie Awards	Best Overall Sound	The Confessional (Le Confessionnal)	Nominated	
Genie Awards	17th Genie Awards	Best Overall Sound	Polygraph (Polygraphe)	Nominated	
Genie Awards	18th Genie Awards	Best Overall Sound	The Countess of Baton Rouge (La Comtesse de Bâton Rouge)	Nominated	
Genie Awards	18th Genie Awards	Best Overall Sound	The Seat of the Soul (Le siège de l'âme)	Nominated	
Genie Awards	19th Genie Awards	Best Overall Sound	The Red Violin	Won	
Genie Awards	20th Genie Awards	Best Overall Sound	Memories Unlocked (Souvenirs intimes)	Nominated	
Genie Awards	21st Genie Awards	Best Overall Sound	The Art of War	Nominated	
Genie Awards	22nd Genie Awards	Best Overall Sound	A Girl at the Window (Une jeune fille à la fenêtre)	Nominated	
Genie Awards	23rd Genie Awards	Best Overall Sound	Les Boys III	Nominated	
Genie Awards	23rd Genie Awards	Best Overall Sound	The Collector (Le Collectionneur)	Nominated	
Genie Awards	27th Genie Awards	Best Overall Sound	A Sunday in Kigali (Un dimanche à Kigali)	Nominated	
Genie Awards	28th Genie Awards	Best Overall Sound	Silk	Nominated	
Jutra Awards	1st Jutra Awards	Best Sound	The Red Violin	Won	
Jutra Awards	1st Jutra Awards	Best Sound	2 Seconds (2 secondes)	Nominated	
Jutra Awards	1st Jutra Awards	Best Sound	Streetheart (Le Cœur au poing)	Nominated	
Jutra Awards	2nd Jutra Awards	Best Sound	Winter Stories (Histoires d'hiver)	Won	
Jutra Awards	2nd Jutra Awards	Best Sound	Memories Unlocked (Souvenirs intimes)	Nominated	
Jutra Awards	4th Jutra Awards	Best Sound	February 15, 1839 (15 février 1839)	Won	
Jutra Awards	5th Jutra Awards	Best Sound	Séraphin: Heart of Stone (Séraphin: un homme et son péché)	Won	
Jutra Awards	5th Jutra Awards	Best Sound	The Collector (Le Collectionneur)	Nominated	
Jutra Awards	6th Jutra Awards	Best Sound	Gaz Bar Blues	Nominated	
Jutra Awards	8th Jutra Awards	Best Sound	Audition (L'Audition)	Nominated	
Jutra Awards	9th Jutra Awards	Best Sound	A Sunday in Kigali (Un dimanche à Kigali)	Won	
Jutra Awards	9th Jutra Awards	Best Sound	Without Her (Sans elle)	Nominated	
Jutra Awards	10th Jutra Awards	Best Sound	Silk	Won	
Gemini Awards	1st Gemini Awards	Best Sound in a Comedy/Variety/Entertainment/Performing Arts Program/Series	Magnificat	Won	
Gemini Awards	4th Gemini Awards	Best Sound in a Comedy/Variety/Entertainment/Performing Arts Program/Series	Eternal Earth	Nominated	
Gemini Awards	6th Gemini Awards	Best Sound in a Dramatic Program or Series	Princes in Exile	Nominated	
Gemini Awards	8th Gemini Awards	Best Sound in a Dramatic Program or Series	The Boys of St. Vincent	Won	
Gemini Awards	13th Gemini Awards	Best Sound in a Comedy, Variety or Performing Arts Program or Series	Yo-Yo Ma: Inspired by Bach	Nominated	
Gemini Awards	21st Gemini Awards	Best Sound in a Dramatic Program	Human Trafficking	Nominated	
Prix Gémeaux	8th Prix Gémeaux	Best Overall Sound in a Dramatic Program or Series	Shehaweh	Won	
Prix Gémeaux	10th Prix Gémeaux	Best Overall Sound in a Dramatic Program or Series	Miséricorde	Won	
Prix Gémeaux	13th Prix Gémeaux	Best Overall Sound in a Dramatic Program or Series	Marguerite Vollant «La Proclamation»	Won	
Prix Gémeaux	18th Gemini Awards	Best Overall Sound in a Documentaries or Information	Lauzon/Lauzone	Won	
