= The Song of Names =

2019 drama film

- Film poster
- Directed by: François Girard
- Screenplay by: Jeffrey Caine
- Based on: The Song of Names by Norman Lebrecht
- Produced by: Nick Hirschkorn; Lyse Lafontaine; Robert Lantos
- Starring: Tim Roth; Clive Owen
- Cinematography: David Franco
- Edited by: Michel Arcand
- Music by: Howard Shore
- Production companies: Serendipity Point Films; Lyla Films; Feel Films; Ingenious Media; Telefilm Canada; CBC Films; HanWay Films
- Distributed by: Elevation Pictures (Canada); Kinostar Filmverleih (Germany and Austria); Big Bang Media (Hungary); Netflix (United Kingdom); HanWay Films (Worldwide)
- Release date: September 8, 2019 (TIFF)
- Running time: 114 minutes
- Countries: Canada; Germany; Hungary; United Kingdom
- Language: English
- Box office: $1,138,700

The Song of Names is a 2019 drama film directed by François Girard. An adaptation of the novel of the same name by Norman Lebrecht, it stars Tim Roth and Clive Owen as childhood friends from London whose lives have been changed by World War II. The film was nominated for nine Canadian Screen Awards, winning five.

== Plot ==
Dovidl Rapoport, a 9-year-old from Poland and a prodigy at the violin is taken by his father to England in order to take violin lessons. The Simmonds family take him in to provide him with a home since his father must return to Warsaw. Their son Martin starts bonding with his new friend, whom he considers his brother, as he likes Dovidl (anglicized to David) playing the violin.

David continues practising the violin while still remembering his family. Years pass, and David and Martin are now 21 years old. There is just one day left for a concert featuring David, when he mysteriously disappears with his violin.

It is revealed that David has fallen asleep on a bus and visited a Polish Jewish community in Stoke Newington, asking them about whether his family is still alive. He is then taken to a synagogue, where a list of people with the surname Rapoport who died during World War II is announced (in the form of a song, to make it easier to remember). After finding out that none of his family has survived, David breaks down.

Years later, in about 1986, Martin is depicted at age 56 and married. He learns about a violinist, who he notices plays in the same pattern as his brother David, who disappeared about 35 years ago. Martin then sets off to Poland to find his brother.

After meeting David's former love, who says that David left on a plane probably to New York, Martin arrives in New York, where he finds David, married with children. Martin is furious with David and tries to persuade him to perform at a concert. David at first refuses but then accepts on two conditions, which as mentioned later by Martin are: not to reveal his program and not to be seen rehearsing.

Two months later, Martin and his wife attend the concert, where David first plays with an orchestra, and then has a solo performance, in which he plays the 'Song of Names', remembering his family. Martin then receives a letter from David stating the former must think of the latter as dead and they must never meet again. The film ends with Martin reading the Kaddish, having reluctantly accepted that David is now dead to him.

== Cast ==
- Tim Roth as Martin Simmonds
  - Gerran Howell as Martin Simmonds aged 17–23
    - Misha Handley as Martin Simmonds aged 9–13
- Clive Owen as Dovidl Rapoport
  - Jonah Hauer-King as Dovidl Rapoport aged 17–21
    - Luke Doyle as Dovidl Rapoport aged 9–13
- Stanley Townsend as Gilbert Simmonds
- Catherine McCormack as Helen Simmonds
  - Marina Hambro as young Helen
- Magdalena Cielecka as Anna Wozniak (Warsaw)
- Saul Rubinek as Mr. Feinman (New York)
- Eddie Izzard as BBC Radio Announcer
- Jakum Kotynski as Zygmunt Rapoport
- Tamás Puskás as Professor Carl Flesch

== Release ==
The film premiered at the 2019 Toronto International Film Festival.

== Reception ==
The Song of Names received mixed to negative reviews. As of October 2021, 39% of the 56 reviews compiled on review aggregator website Rotten Tomatoes are positive, with an average rating of 5.3/10. The website's critics consensus states, "The Song of Names is made from intriguing ingredients, but they never quite coalesce into a drama that satisfies the way it should."

=== Accolades ===
At the 8th Canadian Screen Awards The Song of Names tied with Antigone for most wins, with five.

Award	Date of ceremony	Category	Recipient(s)	Result	Ref(s)
Canadian Screen Awards	28 May 2020	Best Art Direction / Production Design	François Séguin and Pierre Perrault	Nominated	
Canadian Screen Awards	28 May 2020	Best Costume Design	Anne Dixon	Nominated	
Canadian Screen Awards	28 May 2020	Best Hair	Michelle Coté, Péter Gyongyosi and Erzsébet Racz	Nominated	
Canadian Screen Awards	28 May 2020	Best Makeup	Fanny Vachon	Won	
Canadian Screen Awards	28 May 2020	Best Original Score	Howard Shore	Won	
Canadian Screen Awards	28 May 2020	Best Original Song	Howard Shore, "The Song of Names (Cantor Prayer)"	Won	
Canadian Screen Awards	28 May 2020	Best Overall Sound	Claude La Haye, Bernard Gariépy Strobl, Mark Appleby and Daniel Bisson	Won	
Canadian Screen Awards	28 May 2020	Best Sound Editing	Francine Poirier, Claude Beaugrand, Michel B. Bordeleau, Raymond Legault, Lise Wedlock and Natalie Fleurant	Won	
Canadian Screen Awards	28 May 2020	Best Visual Effects	Marc-Antoine Rousseau	Nominated	
Canadian Society of Cinematographers	16 July 2020	Best Theatrical Feature Cinematography	David Franco	Won	
Directors Guild of Canada	27 October 2020	Best Production Design – Feature Film	François Séguin	Nominated	
Prix Iris	10 June 2020	Best Sound	Claude Beaugrand, Michel B. Bordeleau, Bernard Gariépy Strobl, Claude La Haye, Raymond Legault	Nominated	
Prix Iris	10 June 2020	Best Original Music	Howard Shore	Nominated	
Prix Iris	10 June 2020	Best Hairstyling	Michelle Coté	Nominated	
Prix Iris	10 June 2020	Best Visual Effects	Alain Lachance, Jean-Pierre Riverin	Nominated	
Prix Iris	3 June 2021	Most Successful Film Outside Quebec		Won	
