= Race (2016 film) =

2016 film about Jesse Owens

- Theatrical release poster
- Directed by: Stephen Hopkins
- Written by: Joe Shrapnel; Anna Waterhouse
- Produced by: Karsten Brünig; Luc Dayan; Kate Garwood; Stephen Hopkins; Jean-Charles Levy; Nicolas Manuel; Louis-Philippe Rochon; Dominique Séguin
- Starring: Stephan James; Jason Sudeikis; Jeremy Irons; Carice van Houten; William Hurt
- Cinematography: Peter Levy
- Edited by: John Smith
- Music by: Rachel Portman
- Production companies: Forecast Pictures; Solofilms; Trinica; Trinity Race; Totally Commercial Films; Mister Smith Entertainment
- Distributed by: Entertainment One Films (Canada); LFR Films (France); SquareOne Entertainment (Germany); Luv Films (India)
- Release dates: February 11, 2016 (Toronto); February 19, 2016 (Canada); July 27, 2016 (France); July 28, 2016 (Germany); August 19, 2016 (India)
- Running time: 135 minutes
- Countries: Canada; France; Germany
- Languages: English; German
- Budget: $5 million
- Box office: $25.1 million

Race is a 2016 biographical sports drama film about African-American athlete Jesse Owens, who won a record-breaking four gold medals at the 1936 Berlin Olympic Games. Directed by Stephen Hopkins and written by Joe Shrapnel and Anna Waterhouse, the film stars Stephan James as Owens, and co-stars Jason Sudeikis, Jeremy Irons, William Hurt and Carice van Houten. It is a co-production of Canada, Germany and France.

Principal photography began on 24 July 2014, in Montreal, Canada. Forecast Pictures, Solofilms and Trinity Race produced the film, supported by the Owens family, the Jesse Owens Foundation, the Jesse Owens Trust and the Luminary Group. The film was a commercial success and received mixed to positive reviews, winning four Canadian Screen Awards, including Best Actor for James.

== Plot ==
In 1933, Jesse Owens, urged by his high school coach, attends Ohio State University; the first in his family to attend college. He faces racial discrimination from some white athletes. Coach Larry Snyder, a former Olympic-level athlete, believes Owens has enormous potential but needs work on his form and technique. When Snyder suggests he is good enough to compete at the 1936 Olympic Games in Berlin, Owens is interested, but hesitant because of racial propaganda in Nazi Germany. The U.S. Olympic Committee is already considering boycotting the Olympics over Germany's discriminatory policies, agreeing to participate only when Nazi official Joseph Goebbels gives assurances that athletes of any race will be allowed to compete, as well as promising to rein in their propaganda.

As Owens struggles to support his girlfriend Ruth and young daughter, he takes a job at a service station, upsetting Snyder when his job conflicts with his commitment to training. When Snyder learns Owens has a family to support, he gets him a no-show job, allowing him to focus on running. Owens goes on to break several records, including some of Snyder's and begins a relationship with a flashy woman whose attention he attracts with his newfound fame. When Ruth threatens him with a lawsuit, Owens becomes distracted and loses a race to runner Eulace Peacock. Owens decides to return to Ruth to reconcile, convincing her to marry him, they do. As the Olympics draw closer, the NAACP asks him not to go to Berlin for political reasons. Owens is conflicted, but Peacock, now injured, urges him to compete to defy Nazi racial ideology.

In Berlin, Owens sets a new record and wins his first gold medal in the 100-meter dash. When he is brought by International Olympic Committee member Avery Brundage to receive congratulations from Adolf Hitler, he is told that Hitler has left the stadium early to avoid traffic. Brundage tells Goebbels that Hitler must congratulate all winners, which Goebbels rebuffs.

Owens qualifies for the long jump after the German record holder Luz Long unexpectedly gives him guidance. Owens sets yet another record and wins the gold medal; Luz publicly shakes his hand and joins him for a victory lap, later privately expressing concern about the current state of Germany. Owens wins his fourth and final gold medal in the 4 × 100-meter relay, filling in for two Jewish American athletes cut by Brundage who is convinced by Goebbels to do so to avoid a scandal over a business arrangement Brundage entered with the Nazis before the games. Film director Leni Riefenstahl records Owens' victories despite Goebbels' orders; she asks Owens to repeat his medal-winning long jump to get a few more shots for her next film, Olympia.

Back in America, Owens and Snyder attend a banquet in honor of Owens, but the doorman regretfully tells Owens he must enter through the service entrance. Owens does so despite Snyder's protests, recognized by various awed observers. The elevator operator, a young white male, asks for Owens' autograph before taking him and Ruth up to the banquet.

== Cast ==
- Stephan James as Jesse Owens
- Jason Sudeikis as Larry Snyder
- Jeremy Irons as Avery Brundage
- Carice van Houten as Leni Riefenstahl
- William Hurt as Jeremiah Mahoney
- Shanice Banton as Ruth Solomon-Owens
- Amanda Crew as Peggy
- Jeremy Ferdman as Marty Glickman
- Barnaby Metschurat as Joseph Goebbels
- Chantel Riley as Quincella
- David Kross as Carl "Luz" Long
- Glynn Turman as Harry Davis
- Jonathan Aris as Arthur Lill
- Shamier Anderson as Eulace Peacock
- Tony Curran as Lawson Robertson
- Nicholas Woodeson as Fred Rubien
- Giacomo Gianniotti as Sam Stoller
- Eli Goree as Dave Albritton
- Anthony Sherwood as Rev. Ernest Hall
- Jon McLaren as Trent
- Tim McInnerny as General Charles
- Vlasta Vrána as St. John
- Adrian Zwicker as Adolf Hitler
- Karl Graboshas as Adolf Dassler
- Arthur Holden as Rudolf Dassler
- Jonathan Higgins as Dean Cromwell
- Anian Zollner as Hans von Tschammer

== Production ==
=== Development ===
John Boyega was initially set to star as Owens; however, he eventually dropped out to star in Star Wars: The Force Awakens. and was subsequently replaced by Stephan James. German and Canadian distribution was handled by Squareone Entertainment and Entertainment One with Focus Features handling the distribution in the United States.

=== Filming ===
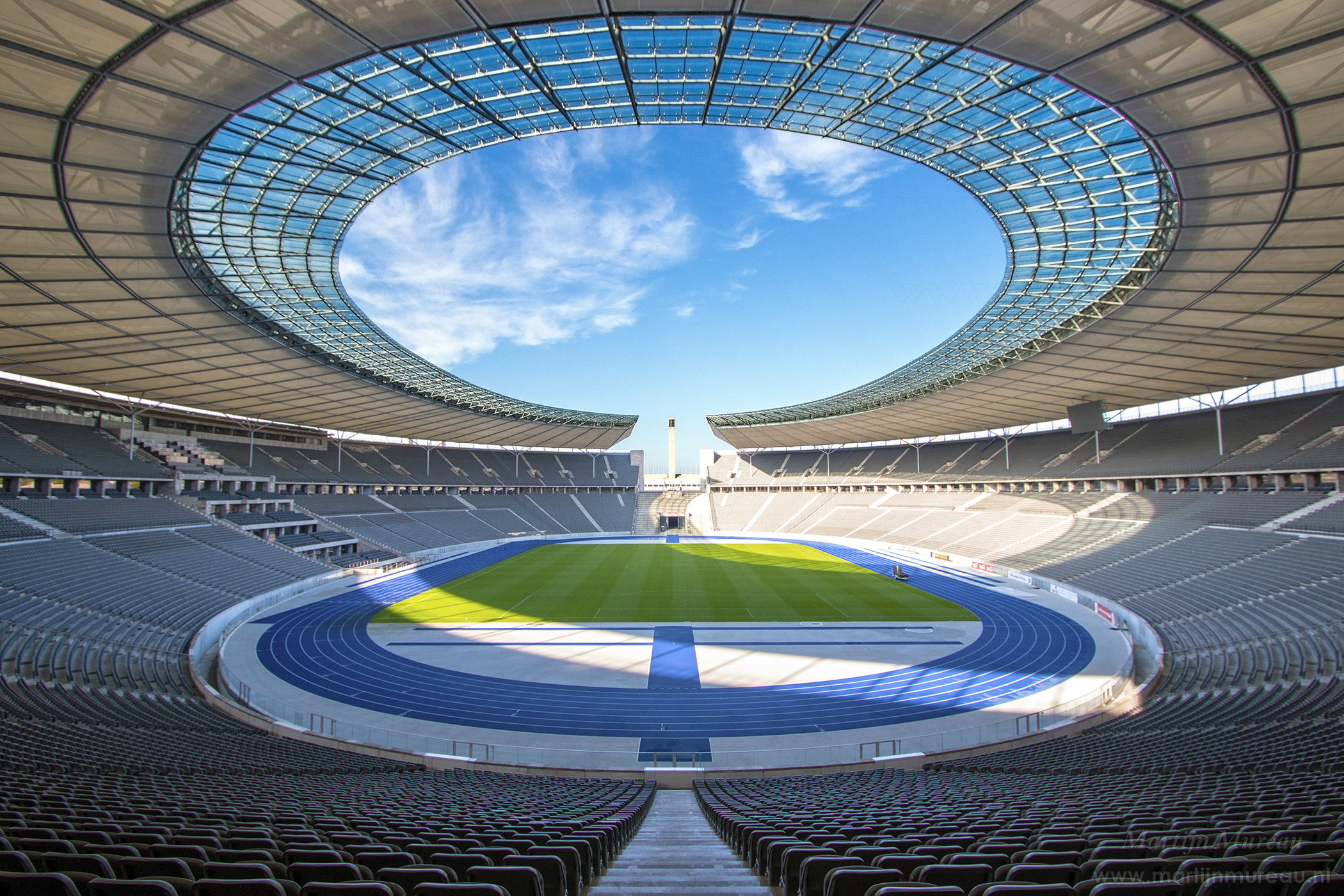
The film was shot on location at Olympic Stadium in Berlin.

Principal photography started on 24 July 2014, in Montreal, and on location at Olympic Stadium in Berlin.

== Release ==
On October 1, 2014, Focus Features originally set a release date of April 8, 2016. However, in August 2015, the release date was pushed up to February 19, 2016.

On February 15, an advance screening was shown at Mershon Auditorium at Ohio State University, Owens' alma mater. Jesse Owens' two daughters and Stephan James were in attendance and addressed the crowd. The President of Ohio State, Michael V. Drake, also addressed the crowd and spoke briefly about Owens' global impact and life at Ohio State. It was released by Entertainment One in Canada, Focus Features in the United States on 19 February 2016, Eagle Pictures in Italy on 31 March 2016, and SquareOne Entertainment in Germany on 5 May 2016.

== Reception ==
=== Box office ===
Race grossed $19.2 million in North America and $5.9 million in other territories for a worldwide total of $25.1 million.

In the United States and Canada, pre-release tracking suggested the film would gross $4–7 million from 2,369 theaters in its opening weekend, trailing fellow newcomer Risen ($7–12 million projection) but similar to The Witch ($5–7 million projection). It ended up grossing $7.4 million in its opening weekend, finishing in sixth at the box office.

=== Critical response ===
On the review aggregator website Rotten Tomatoes, 64% of 158 critics' reviews are positive. The website's consensus reads: "Race is nowhere near as thrillingly fleet or agile as its subject, but the story—and a winning central performance from Stephan James—are enough to carry it over the finish line." As of August 2020, Metacritic assigned the film a weighted average score of 56 out of 100, based on 35 critics, indicating "mixed or average reviews". Audiences polled by CinemaScore gave the film an average grade of "A" on an A+ to F scale.

=== Accolades ===
Race received eight nominations, including Best Motion Picture, at the 5th Canadian Screen Awards.

Award	Date of ceremony	Category	Recipient(s)	Result	Ref(s)
Canadian Screen Awards	12 March 2017	Best Motion Picture	Louis-Philippe Rochon, Dominique Séguin, Jean-Charles Lévy, Luc Dayan	Nominated	
Canadian Screen Awards	12 March 2017	Best Actor	Stephan James	Won	
Canadian Screen Awards	12 March 2017	Best Art Direction / Production Design	David Brisbin, Isabelle Guay, Jean-Pierre Paquet	Nominated	
Canadian Screen Awards	12 March 2017	Best Overall Sound	Claude La Haye, Luc Boudrias, Pierre-Jules Audet	Won	
Canadian Screen Awards	12 March 2017	Best Sound Editing	Pierre-Jules Audet, Jérôme Décarie, Michelle Cloutier, Stan Sakell, Jean-François Sauvé, Mathieu Beaudin, François Senneville, Luc Raymond, Jean-Philippe Saint-Laurent	Won	
Canadian Screen Awards	12 March 2017	Best Costume Design	Mario Davignon	Nominated	
Canadian Screen Awards	12 March 2017	Best Make-Up	Natalie Trépanier, Réjean Goderre	Nominated	
Canadian Screen Awards	12 March 2017	Best Visual Effects	Martin Lipmann, Cynthia Mourou, Benoît Touchette, Jonathan Piché-Delorme, Frédéric Breault	Won	
Golden Trailer Awards	4 May 2016	Best Independent TV Spot	Focus Features	Nominated	
Image Awards	11 February 2017	Outstanding Actor in a Motion Picture	Stephan James	Nominated	
Leo Awards	2017	Best Supporting Performance by a Male in a Motion Picture	Eli Goree	Won	
Prix Iris	4 June 2017	Best Art Direction	David Brisbin, Isabelle Guay, Jean-Pierre Paquet	Nominated	
Prix Iris	4 June 2017	Best Sound	Pierre-Jules Audet, Luc Boudrias, Claude La Haye	Nominated	
Prix Iris	4 June 2017	Best Visual Effects	Martin Lipmann, Cynthia Mourou, Benoît Touchette	Nominated	
Prix Iris	4 June 2017	Best Costumes	Mario Davignon	Nominated	
Prix Iris	4 June 2017	Best Hairdressing	Réjean Goderre	Nominated	

== See also ==
- List of films about the sport of athletics
