= Archaeology of Quebec =

Location of Quebec

Located in east-central Canada, the province of Quebec, in 1972, adopted the Loi sur la Recherche Archéologique or the Archaeological Research Law. This law stated that all artefacts found in archaeological sites were to be protected as cultural goods.

== Permissions ==
Under the Archaeological Research Law, no person can conduct a dig to unearth any goods without having first obtained an archaeological research permit from the minister, regardless of ownership of the land. This permit which is valid for a year from the date it was delivered, if granted, grants the holder permissions to conduct digs and unearth any artefacts uncovered. Even though the permit is good for a full year, the minister at any point in time has the right and power to revoke it if it is felt that the owner has not conforming to the conditions stated by the law and regulations. In the case where the archaeological excavation has to be conducted by someone other than the holder of the permit, the owner of the permit must give the government written consent.

== Reporting ==
If during construction or excavation, for something other than archaeology, artefacts are uncovered, the person who found them must report them immediately to the Government. The government, along with the recommendation of the minister, can:

1. Order the continued suspension of work until the expiration of thirty days from the date of suspension;
2. Allow the searches necessary to release the property or site discovered;
3. Order an amendment he or she considers necessary to the plans of excavation or construction to ensure the integrity and development of property or site discovered.

== Government Action ==
Under the general provisions provided by the Quebec Government, the Minister, after having obtained the advice of the Commission, can:

1. Acquire by agreement or expropriation any cultural property recognized or classified, or any property necessary to isolate, identify, clean or otherwise enhance a historic monument or historic or archaeological site listed, or any property located in a historic district or natural or in a protected area;
2. In the case of historic buildings, archaeological and historic sites, the lease, mortgage, restore, transform, demolish, reconstruct or carry them to another location;
3. Administer to himself or assign to others, the conditions it considers appropriate, the custody and management of cultural property that was acquired;
4. Contribute to the maintenance, restoration, processing or transportation of classified cultural property recognized or city or property located in a historic or natural district, in a historic or archaeological site listed in a heritage site or in a protected area, and the restoration of a building on a listed building, and hold the property subject to a contribution, charge, mortgage or real right that deems appropriate;
5. Grants in order to preserve and highlight cultural property or property in a historic or natural district, in a classified historic site into a heritage site or a protected area;
6. Finally, according to law, agreements with any government on cultural property;
7. Enter into agreements for the implementation of this Act with any person, including a local municipality, a regional county municipality or metropolitan community.

== Additional Laws ==
The Quebec government also passed both the Cultural Property Act and the Environmental Quality Act. Both of these acts pushed for strengthening the recognition and practice of archaeology while emphasizing the need for protecting and safeguarding Quebec's archaeological heritage.
