= Sylvain Bellemare =

Canadian sound editor and sound designer

- Born: February 20, 1968 (age 58); Montreal, Quebec, Canada
- Occupation: sound editor
- Years active: 1993-present

Sylvain Bellemare (born February 20, 1968) is a Canadian sound editor and sound designer, best known internationally as the supervising sound editor of Arrival (2016), for which he won the BAFTA Award for Best Sound (shared with Claude La Haye and Bernard Gariépy Strobl) and the Academy Award for Best Sound Editing. He is also known for Soft Shell Man (2001), It's Not Me, I Swear! (2008), Incendies (2010), Monsieur Lazhar (2011), Gabrielle (2013) and Endorphine (2015). He frequently works with Quebec filmmakers Philippe Falardeau or Denis Villeneuve.

== Awards and nominations ==
Film	Year	Award	Result	Ref(s)
Incendies	2011	Genie Award for Best Sound Editing	Won	
Incendies	2011	Jutra Award for Best Sound	Won	
Inch'Allah	2013	Jutra Award for Best Sound	Nominated	
Monsieur Lazhar	2013	Jutra Award for Best Sound	Won	
Gabrielle	2014	Canadian Screen Award for Best Sound Editing	Nominated	
Amsterdam	2014	Canadian Screen Award for Best Sound Editing	Nominated	
Endorphine	2016	Canadian Screen Award for Best Sound Editing	Nominated	
Arrival	2017	Academy Award for Best Sound Editing	Won	
Arrival	2017	BAFTA Award for Best Sound	Won	
Arrival	2017	Golden Reel Award for Outstanding Achievement in Sound Editing – Dialogue and ADR for Feature Film	Nominated	
Arrival	2017	Golden Reel Award for Outstanding Achievement in Sound Editing – Sound Effects and Foley for Feature Film	Nominated	
Before the Streets	2017	Prix Iris for Best Sound	Nominated	
All You Can Eat Buddha	2018	Canadian Screen Award for Best Sound Editing	Nominated	
All You Can Eat Buddha	2018	Prix Iris for Best Sound	Nominated	
And the Birds Rained Down	2020	Canadian Screen Award for Best Sound Editing	Nominated	
Sympathy for the Devil	2020	Prix Iris for Best Sound	Won	
Goddess of the Fireflies	2021	Prix Iris for Best Sound	Nominated	
The Decline	2021	Prix Iris for Best Sound	Nominated	
