= The Red Violin =

1998 Canadian drama film directed by François Girard

- Theatrical release poster
- Directed by: François Girard
- Written by: Don McKellar; François Girard
- Produced by: Niv Fichman
- Starring: Carlo Cecchi; Irene Grazioli; Jean-Luc Bideau; Greta Scacchi; Jason Flemyng; Sylvia Chang; Colm Feore; Don McKellar; Samuel L. Jackson
- Cinematography: Alain Dostie
- Edited by: Gaétan Huot
- Music by: John Corigliano
- Production companies: New Line International; Channel 4 Films; Mikado Film; Rhombus Media; Sidecar Films & TV; Telefilm Canada; CITY-TV
- Distributed by: Odeon Films (Canada); Mikado Film (Italy); FilmFour Distributors (United Kingdom); New Line Cinema (Overseas)
- Release dates: September 2, 1998 (Venice); November 13, 1998 (Canada); April 9, 1999 (United Kingdom)
- Running time: 131 minutes
- Countries: Canada; Italy; United Kingdom
- Language: English; French; German; Italian; Mandarin
- Budget: $10–18 million
- Box office: $10 million

The Red Violin (French: Le Violon Rouge) is a 1998 anthology drama film directed by François Girard and starring Samuel L. Jackson, Carlo Cecchi and Sylvia Chang. It spans four centuries and five countries telling the story of a mysterious red-coloured violin and its many owners. The instrument, made in Cremona in 1681 with a future forecast by tarot cards, makes its way to Montreal in 1997, where an appraiser identifies it and it goes to auction. The film was an international co-production among companies in Canada, Italy, and the United Kingdom.

The screenplay, inspired by a historic 1720 Stradivarius violin nicknamed the "Red Mendelssohn", was written by Don McKellar and Girard. The film was shot in Austria, Canada, China, England and Italy. It features a soundtrack by John Corigliano, with solos performed by violinist Joshua Bell.

After premiering at the Venice Film Festival, it received some positive reviews from critics and grossed $10 million at the U.S. box office. It received numerous honours, including the Academy Award for Best Original Score and eight Genie Awards, including Best Motion Picture. The film was also nominated for a Golden Globe for Best Foreign Language Film, but lost to All About My Mother.

== Plot ==
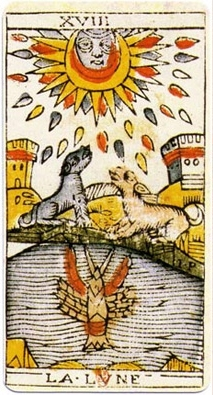
The Moon tarot card

Cremona, 1681 (Language: Italian)

Nicolò Bussotti is a violin-maker whose wife, Anna Rudolfi, is pregnant. Anna asks her servant Cesca to foretell her unborn child's future. Cesca cannot determine the future of someone who was not born, but she does offer to read Anna's future using tarot cards. The first, The Moon, signifies that Anna will live a long life.

In the meantime, Nicolò has fashioned a new violin. He is about to varnish it when he finds that both Anna and the child have died. Distraught, Nicolò returns to his shop and varnishes the violin with a red color. The violin, the last one that Nicolò ever made, then makes its way to an orphanage in Austria.

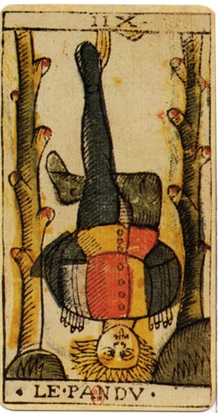
The Hanged Man tarot card

Vienna, 1793 (Language: German and French)

Cesca turns over the second card, The Hanged Man, which means disease and suffering for those around Anna.

At the orphanage, the violin comes into the possession of Kaspar Weiss, a brilliant violin prodigy. The monks at the orphanage ask a violin instructor, Poussin, to adopt the boy to further his development. Poussin brings Weiss and the violin to Vienna. They learn that Prince Mannsfeld is visiting Vienna and is looking for a prodigy to accompany him back to Prussia, promising a generous reward. Poussin puts Weiss through a strict practice regimen. However, the regimen and the "Poussin Meter" (a primitive metronome) take a toll on Weiss' heart defect. On the day of the recital, just before starting to play, Weiss's heart gives out from the stress, and he collapses, dead.

Weiss is buried at the orphanage where he grew up. When Poussin inquires about the violin, the monks explain that they buried it with Weiss. The violin is later stolen by grave robbers travelling in a Romani procession, who take it to England.

Oxford, the late 1890s (Language: English and Romani)

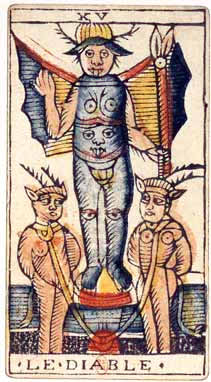
The Devil tarot card

Cesca's third card is The Devil, and she explains that Anna will meet a handsome and intelligent man who will seduce her.

Lord Frederick Pope comes across the Romani procession setting up camp on his estate, as a Romani woman plays the violin. He offers his hospitality in exchange for the violin. Frederick finds great praise in his public concerts with the violin and his compositions, with his lover Victoria Byrd serving as his carnal muse. Victoria, a writer, announces to Frederick that she needs to travel to Russia to research a novel she is working on.

While Victoria is absent, Frederick loses his inspiration to compose and degenerates. When Victoria does not receive his letters for a full week, she resolves to return immediately. But when she arrives, she finds him in the arms of a new muse, the Romani violinist woman. In a moment of rage, Victoria shoots the violin, grazing its neck and detaching its strings and tailpiece, before storming out.

Frederick's final letter to Victoria states that he will be committing suicide and that he is leaving his entire estate to her. The violin ends up in the hands of Frederick's Chinese servant, who returns to Shanghai and sells it to an antiques dealer, who repairs the damage. The instrument was sold to a young woman and her daughter during the 1930s.

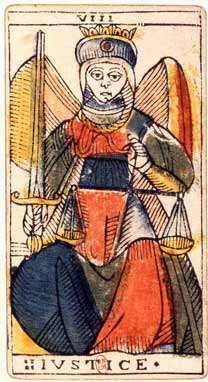
Justice tarot card

Shanghai, late 1960s (Language: Mandarin)

Cesca predicts the fourth card, Justice, means tough times ahead, featuring a trial and persecution, where Anna shall be guilty.

In the chaos of China's Cultural Revolution, any ideas or items deemed "bourgeois" are denounced and should be destroyed. One target for public denunciation and self-criticism is a music teacher named Zhou Yuan, who is berated for his fondness for Western classical music. A political officer, Xiang Pei, successfully defends Zhou. Xiang then returns to her residence and retrieves the Red Violin, given as a gift from her mother. Several Red Guards raid Xiang's apartment after learning of its existence, finding nothing.

Xiang arrives at Zhou's house and pleads with him to take the violin to keep it safe. He relents and vows to keep it hidden, while Xiang leaves to face possible prosecution from Communist Party officials. Years later, Chinese police enter Zhou's home to find his dead body amid a "sanctuary" of dozens of musical instruments. Upon this discovery, the present-day Chinese government ships these items to Montreal for appraisal and sale at auction.

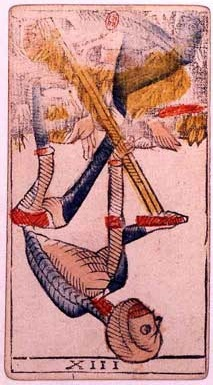
The upside-down Death tarot card

Montréal, 1997 (Language: English and French)

The final card, Death, Cesca sees not as predicting death, but, due to its upside-down positioning, as rebirth.

Charles Morritz arrives in Montreal as an appraiser for the violins sent by the Chinese government. Almost immediately, he notices the Red Violin and believes it may be the legendary last violin of Nicolò Bussotti. He has restorer Evan Williams perform some work on it, while sending samples of the varnish to a lab at the University of Montreal. At the same time, he purchases a copy of the Red Violin from a private collection in London, the closest copy to the original available.

When the results of the varnish tests arrive, Morritz is shocked to learn that the violin's varnish contains human blood. Nicolò had carried his wife's body to his shop after her death and slit her wrist to collect blood for making the red varnish. He admits to the auction manager, Leroux, that it is the Red Violin.

As he prepares to fly home, Morritz stops by the auction house "Duval's", with the London copy in hand. As the auction for the previous lot ends, Morritz switches the Red Violin for the London copy, which is sold for $2.4 million. Morritz calls his wife at home in New York City and asks to speak to his daughter, telling her he has a special present for her upon his return.

== Cast ==
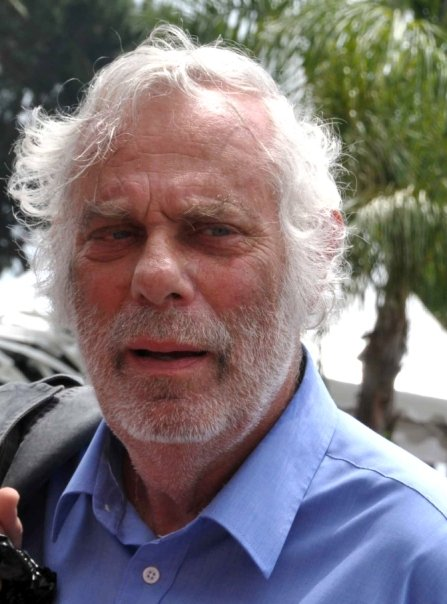
Jean-Luc Bideau has a prominent role in the Vienna scenes.

Cremona

- Carlo Cecchi as Nicolò Bussotti
- Irene Grazioli as Anna Rudolfi Bussotti
- Anita Laurenzi as Cesca
- Samuele Amighetti as Boy

Vienna

- Christoph Koncz as Kaspar Weiss
- Jean-Luc Bideau as Georges Poussin
- Clotilde Mollet as Antoinette Poussin
- Arthur Denberg as Prince Mannsfeld

Oxford

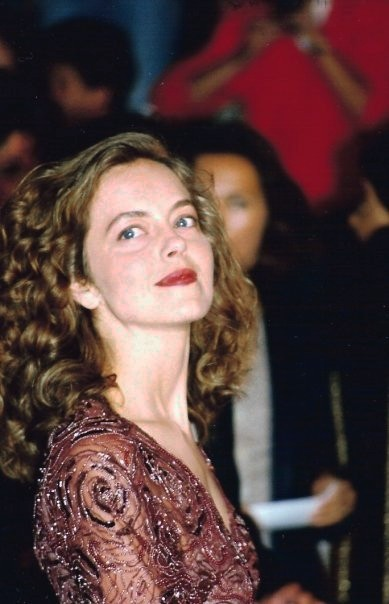
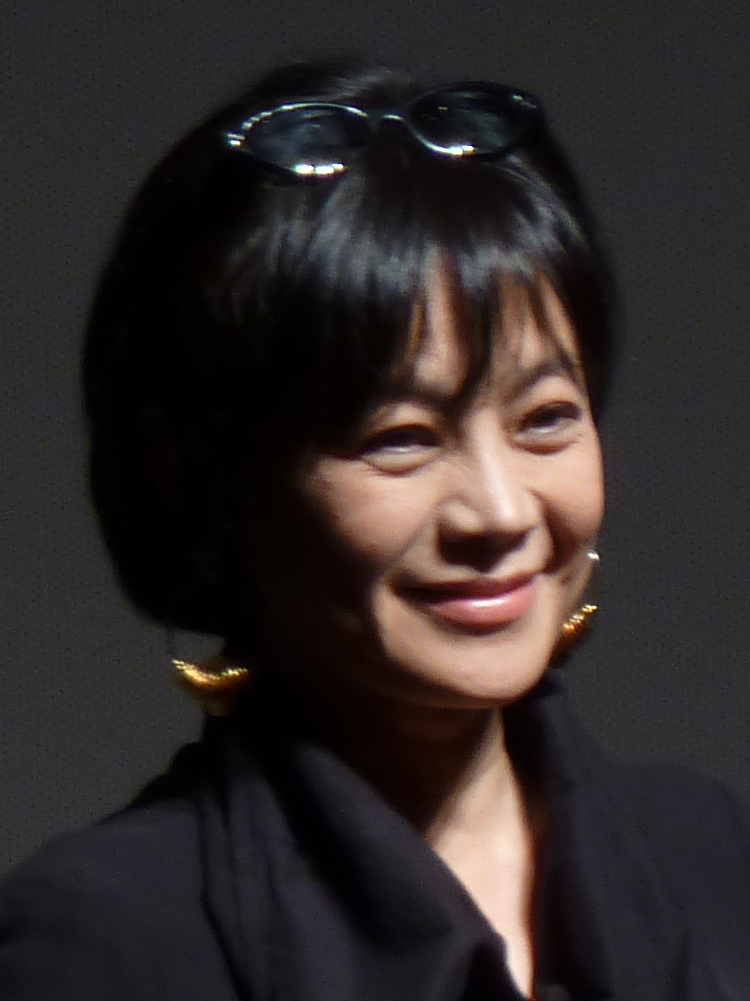
Greta Scacchi and Sylvia Chang star in the Oxford and Shanghai segments, respectively.
- Jason Flemyng as Frederick Pope
- Greta Scacchi as Victoria Byrd
- Eva Marie Bryer as Sara
- Joshua Bell as Orchestra member: First violin (cameo)

Shanghai

- Sylvia Chang as Xiang Pei, & Xiang Pei's Mother
- Tao Hong as Chen Gang
- Liu Zifeng as Zhou Yuan
- Han Xiaofei as Ming
- Wang Xiaoshuai as One of The Four Police Officers (cameo)

Montreal

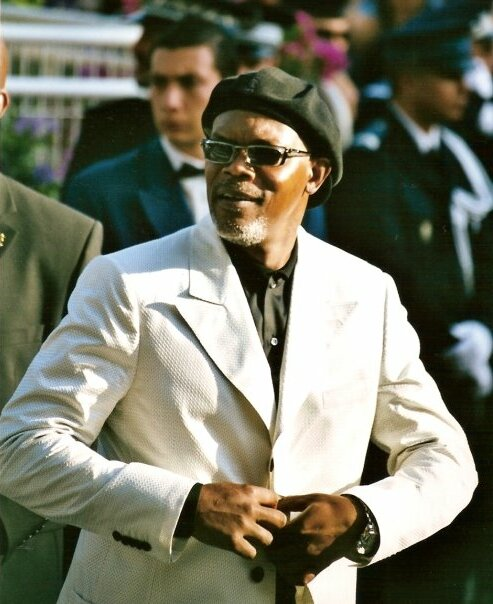
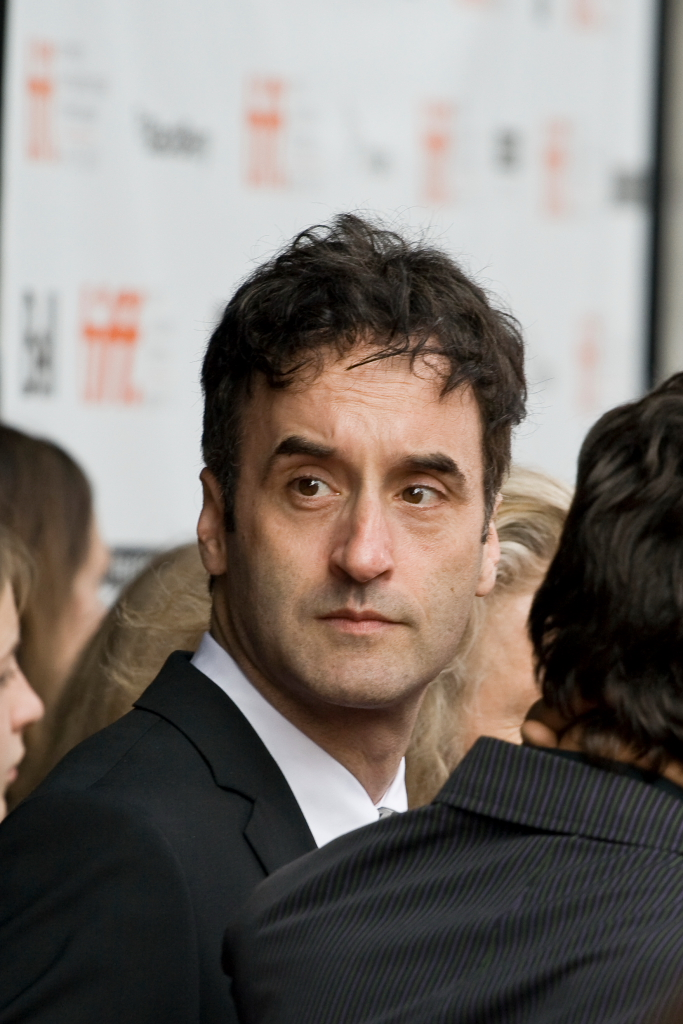
Samuel L. Jackson and screenwriter Don McKellar play major roles in the Montreal scenes.
- Samuel L. Jackson as Charles Morritz
- Colm Feore as Auctioneer
- Monique Mercure as Madame Leroux
- Don McKellar as Evan Williams
- Ireneusz Bogajewicz as Ruselsky
- Julian Richings as Nicolas Olsberg, representing the Pope Foundation
- Marvin Mill as Limousine Driver
- Russell Yuen as Older Ming, son of Xiang Pei
- Sandra Oh as Madame Ming
- Rémy Girard as Customs Agent

== Production ==
=== Development ===
The film was inspired by one of the violins of Antonio Stradivari, the 1720 "Red Mendelssohn", which features a unique red stripe on its top right side. By the time the film was made, the "Red Mendelssohn" was owned by Elizabeth Pitcairn, heiress to the PPG fortune, whose grandfather purchased it for her 16th birthday for $1.7 million at auction at Christie's London. The violin's name refers to one of its notable former owners, the German violinist Lilli Bohnke (née von Mendelssohn, 1897–1928), who played the instrument in the 1920s.

Despite rumours and the film, the "Red Mendelssohn" is varnished with burgundy rather than blood. Stradivarius used red varnish on numerous other violins from 1704 to 1720, the so-called "golden period", and other red-coloured violins besides the Red Mendelssohn survive.

Director François Girard opted to make a film about a violin due to his belief that "Making film is making music". The concept of a history of a violin was the starting point, with Girard not initially realizing the project would call for five languages or an unusually large budget. His screenplay, written with Don McKellar, sees the eponymous instrument travel over greater distances, while the years separating each segment become shorter. This suggests a musical structure, though Girard said this was not planned and only developed as he and McKellar continued to write.

Girard and McKellar proposed their story and project to various Hollywood companies, but were unwilling to give up creative control, or to limit the number of languages spoken in the film, as U.S. companies requested. As a result, they produced the film with Rhombus Media.

=== Filming ===
The film is an international co-production, allowing for a larger budget to be accumulated from various sources, making The Red Violin one of the most costly Canadian films produced to date. Its final budget was $15 million. Girard and McKellar employed a few crew members from their previous film, Thirty Two Short Films About Glenn Gould (1993), including cinematographer Alain Dostie, editor Gaétan Huot and actor Colm Feore.

The co-production also allowed for shooting in Canada, China, and around Europe, including Montreal, Shanghai and Vienna. Girard, McKellar and producer Niv Fichman went location scouting at the beginning of production, visiting Prague and Hong Kong and meeting writers who helped correct foreign-language dialogue. Ultimately, they decided they needed to film in Vienna and Shanghai to depict those cities properly. Lord Frederick Pope's estate was Chicheley Hall while his concerts were filmed at the Sheldonian Theatre at Oxford University. In Cremona, Italy, Girard visited violin-making schools and met some people who made the instruments, recruiting some as extras.

The most challenging part was securing permission from the government of China to simulate the Cultural Revolution in Shanghai, with Fichman travelling to China seven times before the government allowed shooting, which took place only five days later. Shooting in Shanghai took place on Hong Zhen Old Street in the Hongkou District. Hundreds of Chinese police, with guns, closed the streets where shooting took place, due to the 450 extras loudly calling for revolution. Fichman claimed "there was the possibility that we were going to cause a riot". The action in the Montreal segments was the most complex, which Girard said put the greatest strain on himself and the cast. Filming completed after six months, with shooting on 60 of those days.

=== Music ===
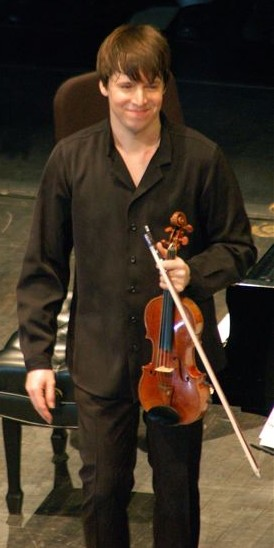
Joshua Bell performed the violin for the film score.

Girard had no formal musical background; his main experience working with music was as a film director. The film score was written by composer John Corigliano, with every violin solo in the film performed by violinist Joshua Bell. The conductor was Esa-Pekka Salonen. The score is mainly of the Chaconne genre, while the ostensibly Romani music was also actually written by Corigliano. Bell said he was eager to join the film crew, citing his enthusiasm for Corigliano's work and his use of form. Corigliano, looking for a romantic musical performance, also referred to Bell as the ideal choice for a musician, calling him "an aristocrat as a violinist". Girard stated Bell and Corigliano were involved from the outset, and reviewed every version of the screenplay as it was in development.

Much of the score had to be written before principal photography, which is rare in film. Since the violin movements seen in the film had to match Corigliano's music, real-life child prodigy Christoph Koncz was cast. However, Girard tied up two musicians to actor Jason Flemyng to help him give his performance as a violinist, the "Octopus" method. After shooting completed, Corigliano finished "Anna's theme".

== Release ==
The Red Violin premiered at the Venice Film Festival on September 2, 1998, where it received standing applause. It opened in the Toronto International Film Festival in September 1998. It was also screened in international film festivals in London and Tokyo.

Odeon Films gave The Red Violin a wider release in Canada on 13 November 1998. A limited release followed in the United Kingdom on 9 April 1999. and the film opened in the United States on 11 June 1999, distributed by Lions Gate Entertainment.

== Reception ==
=== Box office ===
By February 1999, The Red Violin had grossed $2 million in Canada, surpassing the previous year's winner of the Genie Award for Best Motion Picture, The Sweet Hereafter. By August 1999, the film grossed $6 million in the United States, which Lions Gate Entertainment declared "a huge success for a specialty film". It was the distributor's most successful Canadian film of the year.

The film finished its run having made US$10 million in the United States. In Canada, it finished with a gross of $3,378,800, making it one of the most seen English Canadian films in national box-office history. It was not a major hit overseas.

=== Critical reception ===
On the review aggregator website Rotten Tomatoes, the film holds an approval rating of 73% based on 41 reviews, and an average rating of 7.2/10. The site's consensus states: "A symphony of storytelling whose lulls lead to satisfying crescendos, The Red Violin weaves a centuries-long saga with the journey of a single instrument." On Metacritic, the film has a weighted average score of 57 out of 100, based on 22 critics, indicating "mixed or average reviews".

Canadian Maclean's critic Brian D. Johnson, referencing Thirty Two Short Films About Glenn Gould, wrote "The Red Violin amounts to more than Five Short Films About a Fiddle", crediting Corigliano's music for supplying intensity and the story for making the eponymous violin into its own interesting character. Roger Ebert called the film "heedlessly ambitious", possessing "the kind of sweep and vision that we identify with elegant features from decades ago". For The Guardian, Jonathan Romney wrote that "as flawed movies go, it's elegant, entertaining and quite breathtakingly ambitious". Stephen Holden wrote in The New York Times that the film did not live up to its score. Entertainment Weekly gave the film a B, with Lisa Schwarzbaum writing the fictional violin surpassed all real fiddles in colourful pedigree, and finding the storytelling interesting.

The Washington Post critic Stephen Hunter assessed the score to be the strongest element of the film, and the story to be intriguing and occasionally "macabre". Xan Brooks' The Independent review compared the production design unfavourably to a BBC work for students. Laura Kelly of the Sun-Sentinel called the film "praise-worthy". In The San Francisco Gate, Bob Graham accepted the film's ambition and judged Samuel L. Jackson to be cool in the role, in a very different way than in Pulp Fiction (1994). In National Review, Jay Nordlinger praised Corigliano's soundtrack but criticized Girard's direction and film.

In Queen's Quarterly, Maurice Yacowar analyzed the film as presenting the characters of Kaspar, Xian, Peng and Morritz as manifestations of different aspects of Bussotti's passions, while the characters of Poussin and bidder Ruselsky wanted to use the instrument to further their own interests. Yacowar concluded the film "explores passions directed outwards". In the Canadian Journal of Film Studies, Brenda Longfellow criticized the film for materialism and depicting "the sacrifice of a woman on the altar of art". In 2002, readers of Playback voted The Red Violin the third best Canadian film ever.

In 2001, an industry poll conducted by Playback named it the fourth best Canadian film of the preceding 15 years.

=== Accolades ===
Composer John Corigliano was previously nominated for the Academy Award for Best Original Score for the 1980 film Altered States before winning for The Red Violin. He won over American Beauty, which he had considered the front-runner before the ceremony.

At the Genie Awards, Don McKellar was effectively competing against himself as a screenwriter of both Last Night and The Red Violin. The Red Violin dominated the awards, with eight wins. The film also competed in the 1st Jutra Awards, launched to honour the Cinema of Quebec. Due to the international production and amount of English, numerous English Canadians accepted awards.

The Red Violin was also nominated for Chicago Film Critics Association Award for Best Original Score, but lost to South Park: Bigger, Longer & Uncut.

Award	Date of ceremony	Category	Recipient(s)	Result	Ref(s)
Academy Awards	26 March 2000	Best Original Score	John Corigliano	Won	
Chicago Film Critics Association	13 March 2000	Best Original Score	John Corigliano	Nominated	
Genie Awards	4 February 1999	Best Motion Picture	Niv Fichman	Won	
Genie Awards	4 February 1999	Best Direction	François Girard	Won	
Genie Awards	4 February 1999	Best Screenplay	Don McKellar and François Girard	Won	
Genie Awards	4 February 1999	Best Cinematography	Alain Dostie	Won	
Genie Awards	4 February 1999	Best Art Direction	Francois Seguin	Won	
Genie Awards	4 February 1999	Best Editing	Gaétan Huot	Nominated	
Genie Awards	4 February 1999	Best Music	John Corigliano	Won	
Genie Awards	4 February 1999	Best Sound	Claude La Haye, Jo Caron, Bernard Gariepy Strobl and Hans Peter Strobl	Won	
Genie Awards	4 February 1999	Best Sound Editing	Marcel Pothier, Jérôme Décarie, Carole Gagnon, Antoine Morin and Jacques Plante	Nominated	
Genie Awards	4 February 1999	Best Costume Design	Renée April	Won	
Golden Globes	23 January 2000	Best Foreign Language Film		Nominated	
Jutra Awards	7 March 1999	Best Film	Niv Fichman and Daniel Iron	Won	
Jutra Awards	7 March 1999	Best Direction	François Girard	Won	
Jutra Awards	7 March 1999	Best Screenplay	François Girard and Don McKellar	Won	
Jutra Awards	7 March 1999	Best Actress	Sylvia Chang	Nominated	
Jutra Awards	7 March 1999	Best Supporting Actor	Colm Feore	Won	
Jutra Awards	7 March 1999	Best Supporting Actress	Monique Mercure	Nominated	
Jutra Awards	7 March 1999	Best Art Direction	François Séguin and Renée April	Won	
Jutra Awards	7 March 1999	Cinematography	Alain Dostie	Won	
Jutra Awards	7 March 1999	Best Editing	Gaétan Huot	Won	
Jutra Awards	7 March 1999	Best Sound	Claude La Haye, Marcel Pothier, Hans Peter Strobl and Guy Pelletier	Won	
Jutra Awards	7 March 1999	Best Original Music	John Corigliano	Won	
Online Film Critics Society	2000	Best Foreign Language Film		Nominated	
Satellite Awards	16 January 2000	Best Costume Design	Renée April	Nominated	
Tokyo International Film Festival	1998	Best Artistic Contribution	François Girard	Won	
Toronto Film Critics Association	16 December 1998	Best Canadian Film		Runner-up	

== Legacy ==
Corigliano adapted his score into a Concerto for Violin and Orchestra (The Red Violin), performed in Baltimore, Dallas and Atlanta from 2003 to 2004. In 2005, it was performed at the San Francisco Ballet. He later wrote another adaptation, The Red Violin: Chaconne for Violin and Orchestra.

After the film's release, the Red Mendelssohn owner Elizabeth Pitcairn also learned its Chaconne, which she called "spooky", adding "that's when the violin can tell its own story; that's when it can actually speak". Pitcairn brought the "Red Violin" to the Prince George Symphony Orchestra in 2012.
