= François Girard =

French Canadian director and screenwriter

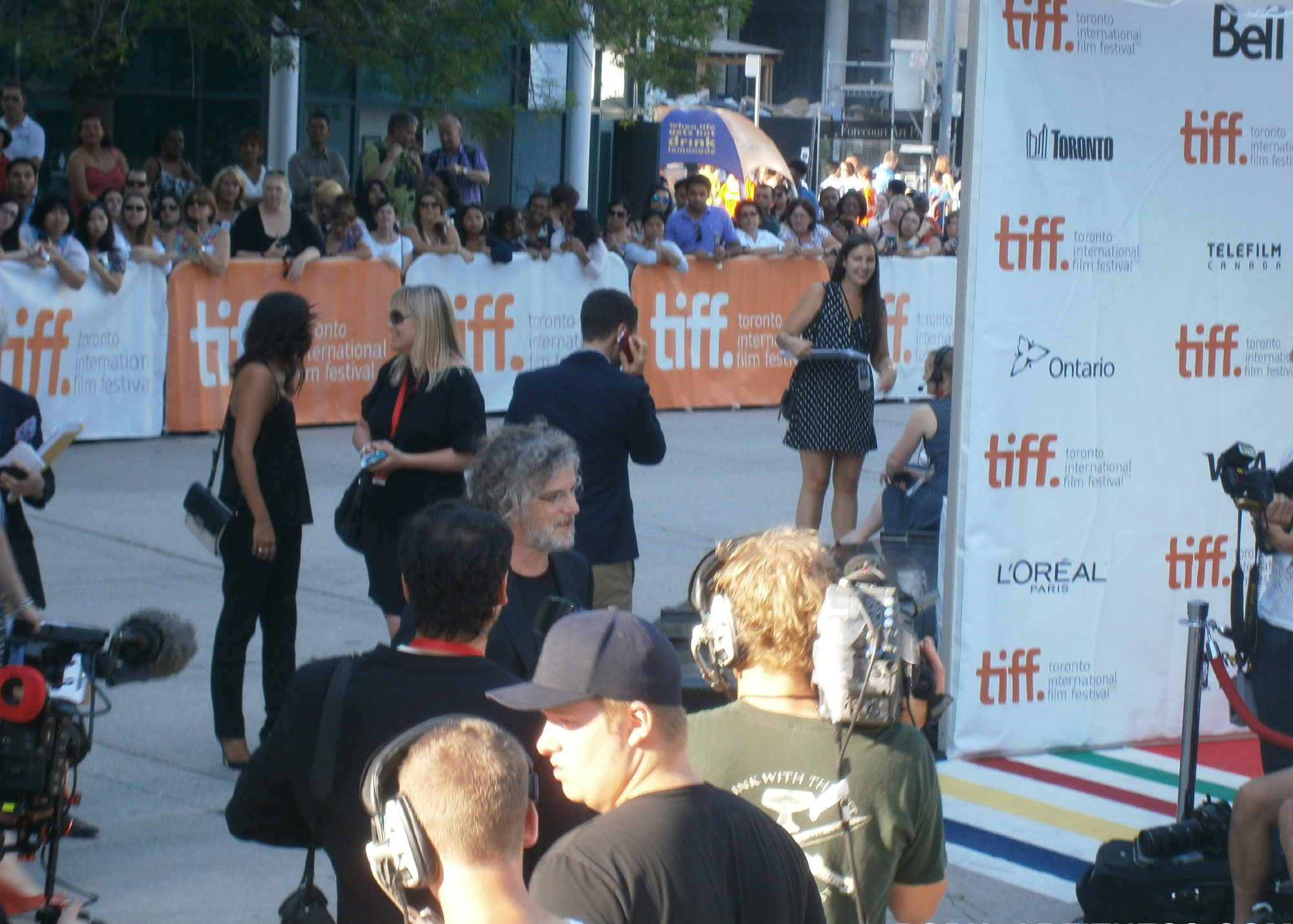
- Born: January 12, 1963 (age 63); Saint-Félicien, Quebec, Canada
- Occupations: Film director Screenwriter
- Years active: 1990–present

François Girard OC (French pronunciation: [fʁɑ̃swa ʒiʁaʁ]; born January 12, 1963) is a French Canadian director and screenwriter from Montreal. Born in Saint-Félicien, Quebec, Girard's career began on the Montreal art video circuit. In 1990, he produced his first feature film, Cargo; he attained international recognition following his 1993 Thirty Two Short Films About Glenn Gould, a series of vignettes about the life of piano prodigy Glenn Gould. In 1998, he co-wrote and directed The Red Violin, which follows the ownership of a red violin over several centuries. The Red Violin won an Academy Award for Best Original Score, thirteen Genie Awards and nine Jutra Awards.

He has also directed various works for the stage, including Stravinsky's Symphony of Psalms, Oedipus Rex, and Alessandro Baricco's Novecento at the Edinburgh International Festival; Kafka's The Trial, adapted for the stage by Serge Lamothe at the National Arts Centre, Ottawa; the oratorio Lost Objects at the Brooklyn Academy of Music; Siegfried in Toronto; and The Lindbergh Flight and The Seven Deadly Sins, first in Lyon and then in Edinburgh. Girard has also produced a residency show for Cirque du Soleil, Zed, in Tokyo and Zarkana, which opened at Radio City Music Hall in New York in the summer of 2011.

In 2013, the Metropolitan Opera in New York opened a new production of Richard Wagner's Parsifal directed by Girard. The production received near universal acclaim from critics and audiences alike.

His television credits include Le dortoir, Peter Gabriel's Secret World and The Sound of the Carceri, one of the six episodes of Yo Yo Ma Inspired by Bach.

== Filmography ==
- Cargo (1990)
- Thirty Two Short Films About Glenn Gould (1993)
- The Red Violin (1998)
- Silk (2007)
- Boychoir (2014)
- Hochelaga, Land of Souls (2017)
- The Song of Names (2019)
