= Endorphine (film) =

2015 film

- French-language poster
- Directed by: André Turpin
- Written by: Robert Morin
- Produced by: Luc Déry; Kim McCraw
- Starring: Sophie Nélisse; Mylène Mackay
- Cinematography: Josée Deshaies
- Edited by: Sophie Leblond
- Music by: François Lafontaine
- Distributed by: Les Films Séville (Canada); Les Films Christal (Worldwide)
- Release dates: 11 September 2015 (TIFF); 22 January 2016 (Fr. Can.)
- Running time: 84 minutes
- Country: Canada
- Language: French

Endorphine is a 2015 Canadian drama film directed by André Turpin. It was shown in the Vanguard section of the 2015 Toronto International Film Festival. It had a limited release in a few French-Canadian theaters on 22 January 2016, and was made available for retail purchase on 3 May 2016.

== Cast ==
- Sophie Nélisse as Simone de Koninck (13 years old)
  - Mylène Mackay as Simone (25 years old)
  - Lise Roy as Simone (60 years old)
- Monia Chokri as Simone's mother
- Stéphane Crête as Simone's father
- Anne-Marie Cadieux as the hypnotherapist
- Guy Thauvette as Mr. Porter

== Reception ==
The film's technical cinematography was praised, but the confusing structure was described as cold and emotionless. According to the Toronto International Film Festival, the film "is an intoxicating cinematic puzzle that intertwines the lives of three seemingly unconnected characters."
