= Silk (2007 film) =

- A French poster for the film
- Directed by: Francois Girard
- Written by: François Girard; Michael Golding
- Starring: Michael Pitt; Keira Knightley; Alfred Molina; Miki Nakatani; Kōji Yakusho; Callum Keith Rennie; Sei Ashina
- Cinematography: Alain Dostie
- Edited by: Pia Di Ciaula
- Music by: Ryûichi Sakamoto
- Production companies: Rhombus Media (Canada); Fandango (Italy); Bee Vine Pictures (Japan)
- Distributed by: Alliance Atlantis (Canada); Picturehouse (US); Fandango (Italy); Asmik Ace (Japan)
- Release dates: September 11, 2007 (Toronto); September 14, 2007 (Canada)
- Running time: 107 minutes
- Countries: Canada; Italy; Japan
- Language: English
- Budget: $22 million
- Box office: $8 million

Silk is a 2007 drama film directed by François Girard. An international co-production of Canada, Italy, and Japan, Silk is an adaptation of Italian author Alessandro Baricco's 1996 novel of the same name. It had its world premiere at the 2007 Toronto International Film Festival on September 11, 2007.

American actor Michael Pitt stars in the lead role of the French silkworm smuggler Hervé Joncour, with English actress Keira Knightley as his wife, Hélène, a teacher and keen gardener. Japanese actors Miki Nakatani and Kōji Yakusho are also featured. Exterior Japanese scenes were filmed in the city of Sakata. Knightley's scenes were filmed in Sermoneta, Italy, a small medieval village near Latina. Hélène's garden was filmed at Villa Lina, near Ronciglione.

== Plot ==
The film opens with Hervé narrating his observations of an unidentified Asian woman bathing in a hot spring, then stating that his story actually begins earlier, when he returned to his hometown in 19th century France while on leave from the army. He meets Hélène, a teacher, who wants nothing more than a garden and Hervé, who wants nothing more than to marry her.

Local businessman Baldabiou, who runs three silk mills that support the town economy, is at risk from a European-wide silkworm disease. He convinces Hervé's father, the mayor, to let Hervé leave the army and marry Hélène, and in 1862 Hervé travels to Egypt to purchase silkworm eggs. Since the African silkworms are affected too, Baldabiou next sends Hervé to Japan, even though it is dangerously closed to foreigners. The journey takes months, across thousands of miles of Europe and Asia. Once there, Hervé is blindfolded and taken to a Japanese village where he can buy eggs from a local baron, Hara Jubei. During his stay in the village, he becomes obsessed with Jubei's unnamed concubine (the Girl).

Hervé returns home with an ample supply of eggs. His compensation from Baldabiou makes him rich, and he purchases a large house and garden space for Hélène.

On his second journey to Japan, the Girl gives Hervé a note in Japanese, and he has sex with another girl handed to him by her. Having traded more eggs than on his first trip, Hervé delays his departure by two days in the failed hope of seeing the Girl again.

Back home, Hervé seeks out a Japanese brothel owner in Lyon, Madame Blanche, known for giving the small blue flowers that she wears to her clients. He only wants her to translate the note for him, which reads: "Come back or I shall die." Madame Blanche advises Hervé to "forget about her, she won't die, and you know it."

Baldabiou intends to send Hervé to China, since Japan is no longer safe, but Hervé insists on Japan. When he arrives, war has broken out and the village is abandoned. Jubei's servant boy shows Hervé where Jubei and his household have gone. Jubei becomes hostile and tells Hervé to go home, refuses to show him the Girl, and hangs the servant boy. Hervé buys some eggs in Sakata, but his delays result in the eggs hatching, and all the worms dying, before he reaches France. The town's economy is ruined, though Hervé hires many townspeople to expand Hélène's garden.

Months later, Hervé receives a long letter from the Girl. He again takes the letter to Madame Blanche for translation, who agrees, providing Hervé never comes to see her again. The letter is a deeply moving declaration of love, asking him to be happy in his life, as they will never be together again.

A few years later, Hélène becomes ill, then dies in 1875, in her mid-30s. After her death, Hervé finds a tribute of small, blue flowers on her grave. He seeks out Madame Blanche once more, believing her to have written the letter, but she reveals that Hélène had written the letter and asked Madame Blanche to translate it. Hélène knew that Hervé was in love with a Japanese woman, and wanted him to be happy. Madame Blanche tells Hervé that, more than anything, his wife wanted to be that woman. Hervé finally realizes that it was Hélène who was his true love after all.

Hervé's narration is revealed to be him recounting his story to Ludovic – the son of a friend, the closest thing to a child that Hervé and Hélène have had through the years. Ludovic, now a young man and Hélène's permanent gardener, has a greater appreciation for the love behind the garden.

== Cast ==
- Michael Pitt as Hervé Joncour
- Keira Knightley as Hélène Joncour
- Kōji Yakusho as Hara Jubei
- Miki Nakatani as Madame Blanche
- Alfred Molina as Baldabiou
- Mark Rendall as Ludovic Berbek
  - various as brief appearances of newborn, 2, 4 and 10-year-old Ludovic
- Sei Ashina as The Girl
- Kenneth Welsh as Mayor Joncour
- Jun Kunimura as Umon
- Toni Bertorelli as Verdun
- Callum Keith Rennie as Schuyler
- Carlo Cecchi as Priest
- Marc Fiorini as Mr Chabert

== Reception ==
Silk received mainly negative reviews from critics. On Rotten Tomatoes, the film holds an approval rating of 7% based on 56 reviews, with an average rating of 3.8/10. The website's consensus reads, "Silk contains a simple love triangle story but director Francois Gerard goes to painstaking lengths to turn it into a protracted and wearisome art film." According to Metacritic, which assigned a weighted average score of 39 out of 100 based on 15 critics, the film received "generally unfavorable reviews". It won the Genie Award for Costumes and Prix Jutra for Sound, Cinematography, Art Direction and Costumes.
