= Claude La Haye =

Canadian production sound mixer

- Occupation: Production sound mixer

Claude La Haye is a Canadian production sound mixer, best known internationally as the sound mixer of Arrival (2016), for which he won the BAFTA Award for Best Sound (shared with Bernard Gariépy Strobl and Sylvain Bellemare) and was nominated for the Academy Award for Best Sound Mixing (shared with Strobl). He has been sound mixer/recordist/engineer on many prominent films shot in the province of Quebec including The Red Violin (1998), The Human Stain (2003), Taking Lives (2004), My Internship in Canada (2015), Brooklyn (2015), and Race (2016).

== Awards and nominations ==
Film	Year	Award	Result	Ref(s)
The Red Violin	1999	Genie Award for Best Overall Sound	Won	
Nuremberg	2000	Gemini Award for Best Overall Sound in a Dramatic Program or Series	Nominated	
The Wool Cap	2005	Primetime Emmy Award for Outstanding Sound Mixing for a Limited Series or Movie	Nominated	
War Witch	2013	Canadian Screen Award for Best Overall Sound	Won	
War Witch	2013	Jutra Award for Best Sound	Won	
Race	2017	Canadian Screen Award for Best Overall Sound	Won	
Race	2017	Prix Iris for Best Sound	Nominated	
Two Lovers and a Bear	2017	Prix Iris for Best Sound	Won	
Arrival	2017	BAFTA Award for Best Sound	Won	
Arrival	2017	Academy Award for Best Sound Mixing	Nominated	
Hochelaga, Land of Souls	2018	Canadian Screen Award for Best Overall Sound	Won	
Hochelaga, Land of Souls	2018	Prix Iris for Best Sound	Nominated	
The Song of Names	2020	Canadian Screen Award for Best Overall Sound	Won	
The Song of Names	2020	Prix Iris for Best Sound	Nominated	
