= The Collector (2002 film) =

2002 Canadian film

- French: Le Collectionneur
- Directed by: Jean Beaudin
- Written by: Jean Beaudin; Chantal Cadieux
- Based on: Le Collectionneur by Chrystine Brouillet
- Produced by: Jean Beaudin; Christian Larouche; André Dupuy; Ginette Petit
- Starring: Maude Guérin; Luc Picard; Lawrence Arcouette
- Cinematography: Daniel Jobin
- Edited by: Michel Arcand
- Music by: Michel Cusson
- Distributed by: Christal Films
- Release date: February 22, 2002
- Running time: 125 minutes
- Country: Canada
- Language: French
- Box office: $588,890

The Collector (French: Le Collectionneur) is a Canadian thriller film, released in 2002. Written and directed by Jean Beaudin based on the crime novel of the same name by Chrystine Brouillet, the film stars Maude Guérin as Maude Graham, a police detective trying to track down a serial killer (Luc Picard) while simultaneously sheltering two homeless teenagers, a 16 year old hustler (Lawrence Arcouette) and a 12 year old runaway (Charles-André Bourassa).

The film garnered several Genie Award and Jutra Award nominations in 2003. Picard won the Jutra for Best Supporting Actor.

== Synopsis ==
In Quebec City, Detective Maud Graham is conducting a delicate investigation into several mutilated corpses of young women, leading her to the trail of a methodical, organized, and intelligent serial killer. To catch him, she devises a clever scheme to lure him to her.
