= Kevin Banks =

Canadian sound editor

Kevin Banks is a Canadian sound editor in film and television.

== Awards ==
Award	Year	Category	Work	Result	Ref(s)
Genie Awards	22nd Genie Awards	Best Sound Editing	Treed Murray with John Sievert, Stephen Barden, Joe Bracciale, Virginia Storey	Won	
Genie Awards	29th Genie Awards	Best Sound Editing	Passchendaele with Jane Tattersall, Kevin Banks, Barry Gilmore, Andy Malcolm, David Rose	Won	
Genie Awards	31st Genie Awards	Best Sound Editing	Resident Evil: Afterlife with Stephen Barden, Steve Baine, Alex Bullick, Jill Purdy	Nominated	
Canadian Screen Awards	1st Canadian Screen Awards	Best Sound Editing	Resident Evil: Retribution with Stephen Barden, Steve Baine, Alex Bullick, Jill Purdy	Nominated	
Canadian Screen Awards	2nd Canadian Screen Awards	Best Sound Editing	The Mortal Instruments: City of Bones with Alex Bullick, Christian Schaaning, J.R. Fountain, Jill Purdy, Nathan Robitaille, Nelson Ferreira, Stephen Barden, Steve Baine	Won	
Canadian Screen Awards	3rd Canadian Screen Awards	Best Sound Editing	Pompeii with Steve Baine, Stephen Barden, Fred Brennan, Alex Bullick, J.R. Fountain, Kevin Howard, Jill Purdy	Nominated	
Canadian Screen Awards	4th Canadian Screen Awards	Best Sound Editing	Hyena Road with Jane Tattersall, David McCallum, Martin Gwynn Jones, Barry Gilmore, David Evans, David Rose, Brennan Mercer, Ed Douglas, Goro Koyama, Andy Malcolm	Won	
Canadian Screen Awards	11th Canadian Screen Awards	Best Sound Editing	Brother with Jane Tattersall, David McCallum, Paul Germann, Krystin Hunter	Won	
Canadian Screen Awards	13th Canadian Screen Awards	Best Sound Editing	Code 8: Part II with Tyler Whitham, Joseph Fraioli, Dashen Naidoo, Davi Aquino, Claire Dobson, Krystin Hunter, Dustin Harris, Stefan Fraticelli, Jason Charbonneau, William Kellerman	Nominated	
