= David McCallum (sound editor) =

Canadian sound designer and sound editor

David McCallum is a Canadian sound designer and sound editor.

== Awards ==
Award	Year	Category	Work	Result	Ref(s)
Genie Awards	17th Genie Awards	Best Sound Editing	The Kids in the Hall: Brain Candy with Andy Malcolm, Yuri Gorbachow, Jane Tattersall, Fred Brennan, Sue Conley	Nominated	
Genie Awards	20th Genie Awards	Best Sound Editing	Sunshine with Jane Tattersall, Andy Malcolm, Fred Brennan, Dina Eaton	Won	
Genie Awards	21st Genie Awards	Best Sound Editing	Love Come Down with Fred Brennan, Jane Tattersall, Susan Conley, Robert Warchol, Garrett Kerr, Steven Hammond	Won	
Genie Awards	22nd Genie Awards	Best Sound Editing	Ginger Snaps with Donna Powell, Mishann Lau, Robert Warchol, Jane Tattersall, Fred Brennan, Garrett Kerr	Nominated	
Genie Awards	23rd Genie Awards	Best Sound Editing	Max with Andy Malcolm, Fred Brennan, Barry Gilmore, Goro Koyama, Roderick Deogrades, Jane Tattersall	Won	
Genie Awards	24th Genie Awards	Best Sound Editing	Falling Angels with Graham Jones, Jane Tattersall, Ronayne Higginson, Steven Hammond, Dave Rose	Nominated	
Genie Awards	27th Genie Awards	Best Sound Editing	Beowulf & Grendel with Jane Tattersall, Barry Gilmore, Donna Powell, Dave Rose	Nominated	
Genie Awards	31st Genie Awards	Best Sound Editing	Splice with Dave Rose	Nominated	
Canadian Screen Awards	4th Canadian Screen Awards	Best Sound Editing	Hyena Road with Jane Tattersall, Martin Gwynn Jones, Barry Gilmore, David Evans, David Rose, Brennan Mercer, Ed Douglas, Kevin Banks, Goro Koyama, Andy Malcolm	Won	
Canadian Screen Awards	9th Canadian Screen Awards	Best Sound Editing	Akilla's Escape with David Rose, Krystin Hunter, William Kellerman	Won	
Canadian Screen Awards	9th Canadian Screen Awards	Best Sound Editing	Funny Boy with James Sizemore, Jane Tattersall, Steve Medeiros, Krystin Hunter, Stefan Fraticelli, Jason Charbonneau	Nominated	
Canadian Screen Awards	11th Canadian Screen Awards	Best Sound Editing	Brother with Jane Tattersall, Paul Germann, Krystin Hunter, Kevin Banks	Won	
