= Golden Reel Award for Outstanding Achievement in Sound Editing – Series 1 Hour – Dialogue/ADR =

American television award

- Country: United States
- Presented by: Motion Picture Sound Editors
- Currently held by: Nicholas Renbeck, Michael Feuser, Angela Organ – Succession (2021)

The Golden Reel Award for Outstanding Achievement in Sound Editing – Series 1 Hour – Dialogue/ADR is an annual award given by the Motion Picture Sound Editors. It honors sound editors whose work has warranted merit in the field of television; in this case, their work in the field of automated dialogue replacement, or ADR in long form broadcast media. The "long form" of the title refers to television episodes that have a runtime of more than one hour. It was first awarded in 2002, for episodes premiering the previous year, under the title Best Sound Editing in Television – Dialogue & ADR, Long Form. The term "long form" was added to the category in 2002, as long form television had been award under the category titled Best Sound Editing – Television Movies and Specials – Dialogue & ADR, or some moniker of it, since 1997. The award has been given with its current title since 2022.

== Winners and nominees ==
=== 1990s ===
Year	Program	Nominees	Network
1996	Television Movies of the Week, Pilots and Specials: ADR Editing		
1996	Rebound: The Legend of Earl "The Goat" Manigault	Keith Burhans (dialog editor)	HBO
1997	Best Sound Editing – Television Movies of the Week – Dialogue & ADR		
1997	The Ripper	Peter Austin (supervising dialogue/adr editor); Ron Evans (dialogue/adr editor); Dennis Gray, Barbara Issak, Gary Lewis, Ralph Osborn (dialogue editors); James Hebenstreit, Paul Longstaffe (adr editors); Tami Treadwell (adr recordist)	Starz
1997	Don King: Only in America		HBO
1997	Elvis Meets Nixon		Showtime
1997	Five Desperate Hours	Ray Spiess (adr editor)	NBC
1997	The Hunchback		TNT
1997	Steel Chariots		Fox
1997	Vanishing Point		Fox
1998	A Soldier's Sweetheart	Rick Hinson (supervising sound editor); William H. Angarola (supervising dialogue/adr editor); Robert Guastini, Jason Lezama, Anna MacKenzie, Ray Spiess (dialogue/adr editors); Tami Treadwell (adr recordist)	Showtime
1998	Always Outnumbered		HBO
1998	When Trumpets Fade		HBO
1998	Escape: Human Cargo		Showtime
1998	The Fixer		Showtime
1998	The Planet of Junior Brown		Showtime
1998	Max Q	Ray Spiess (adr editor)	ABC
1998	My Own Country	Robert Jackson (supervising adr editor), Michael Hertlein (dialogue editor)	
1999	Best Sound Editing – Television Movies and Specials – Dialogue & ADR		
1999	Introducing Dorothy Dandridge	David Hankins, Doug Kent (supervising sound/adr/dialogue editors); David Beadle, Larry Goeb, Helen Luttrell (dialogue/adr editors); Erik Aadahl, Patrick Hogan (assistant adr editors); David MacMillan (production mixer); Larry Stensvold (re-recording mixer); Stacey Michaels (adr mixer)	HBO
1999	The Devil's Arithmetic	William H. Angarola (supervising sound/adr editor); Rick Hinson (supervising sound editor); Anna MacKenzie (supervising dialogue editor); Robert Guastini, Mike Marchain, Warren Smith (editors); Tami Treadwell (adr recordist)	Showtime
1999	Having Our Say: The Delany Sisters' First 100 Years	Albert Edmund Lord III (supervising sound/dialogue editor); Lee Lemont (supervising sound editor/adr editor); David M. Cowan, Devin Joseph, Kirsten Reed (dialogue editor); Denise Brady (adr editor)	CBS
1999	Lansky	Stephen Grubbs (supervising sound/adr editor); Dennis Gray, Barbara Issak, Gary Lewis, Ralph Osborn, Warren Smith (dialogue editors); David Melhase, James A. Williams (adr editors)	HBO
1999	Witness Protection	Peter Austin (supervising sound/adr editor); Dennis Gray, Paul Longstaffe (dialogue editors); David Melhase, James A. Williams (adr editors)	HBO
1999	Purgatory	Mark Friedgen (supervising sound/dialogue editor); G. Michael Graham (supervising sound editor); Suzanne Angel (supervising adr editor); Anton Holden, Mark Steele (dialogue editors); Michael Lyle, Tim Terusa (dialogue editors); William C. Carruth (adr editor)	TNT
1999	The Simple Life of Noah Dearborn	Mark Linden (supervising sound/adr editor); Al Decker (supervising sound editor); David Bondelevitch (supervising dialogue editor); Michael Marion (dialogue editor); Jay Keiser, Tara A. Paul, Kerri Wilson (adr editors)	CBS
1999	Tuesdays with Morrie	Bob Newlan (supervising sound/dialogue/adr editor); David Hankins (supervising sound editor); John Green, Sonya Henry (dialogue editors); Larry Goeb (adr editor)	ABC

=== 2000s ===
Year	Program	Episode(s)	Nominees	Network
2000	Noriega: God's Favorite		William H. Angarola (supervising sound/adr editor); Anna MacKenzie (supervising sound/dialogue editor); Rick Hinson, Maciek Malish, Mike Marchain, Ray Spiess (sound editors); Barbara Issak (dialogue editor); Tami Treadwell (adr recordist)	Showtime
2000	Dark Angel	"Pilot"	Jerry Edemann (supervising sound/dialogue/adr editor); Tiffany S. Griffith, Barbara Issak, David Melhase, Ray Spiess, Marty Stein (sound editors)	Fox
2000	The Darkling		Kyle Wright (supervising sound/dialogue/adr editor), Steve Burger (sound editor), Tom Jaeger (adr editor)	USA
2000	The Huntress	"Pilot"	Kyle Wright (supervising sound/dialogue/adr editor); Peter Myles, Stacey Nakasone, Robb Navrides (sound editors)	USA
2000	Frankie & Hazel		Tony Gort (supervising sound/dialogue editor)	Hallmark
2000	The Miracle Worker		John Benson (supervising sound/adr editor), Sonya Henry (supervising dialogue editor), John Green (sound editor)	ABC
2000	The Ultimate Christmas Present		Stephen Grubbs (supervising sound/dialogue/adr editor); John Green, Sonya Henry, Patrick Hogan (sound editors)	Disney
2000	The Virginian		William H. Angarola (supervising sound/dialogue/adr editor), Anna MacKenzie (sound editor)	TNT
2000	Witchblade		Michael E. Lawshe (supervising sound/adr editor), Jennifer Mertens (supervising sound editor), Virginia Cook-McGowan (supervising dialogue editor), Jessica Goodwin (adr editor), Bruce M. Honda (dialogue editor)	TNT
2001	Best Sound Editing in Television – Dialogue & ADR, Long Form			
2001	Uprising		G. Michael Graham (supervising sound/dialogue editor); Devon Heffley Curry (supervising adr editor); Troy Allen, Anton Holden, Mark Steele, Tim Terusa, Randal S. Thomas, Scott A. Tinsley, Rusty Tinsley (sound editors); Bob Goold (adr editor)	NBC
2001	Attila		Mark Friedgen, Joe Melody (supervising sound editors); Kristi Johns (supervising adr editor); Rick Crampton, Joy Ealy, David C. Eichhorn, Anton Holden, Michael Lyle, Mark Steele, Tim Terusa, Randal S. Thomas, Rusty Tinsley (sound editors)	USA
2001	Jane Doe		Bernard Weiser (supervising sound editor); Lee Lemont (supervising adr editor); Frank A. Fuller Jr., Kevin Hamilton, Nancy Nugent, Lance Wiseman (sound editors)	USA
2001	Bojangles		Doug Kent, Anthony Mazzei (supervising sound editors); Ian Morgan (supervising adr editor); David Beadle, Sonya Henry, Ralph Osborn (sound editors)	HBO
2001	Life with Judy Garland: Me and My Shadows		Brandon Walker (supervising sound/dialogue/supervising adr editor); Janice Ierulli, Angie Pajek, Phong Tran (sound editors)	ABC
2001	When Billie Beat Bobby		Brandon Walker (supervising sound/dialogue editor), Angie Pajek (supervising adr editor)	ABC
2001	The Lost Battalion		David C. Eichhorn (supervising sound/dialogue editor); William C. Carruth (supervising adr editor); Rick Crampton, Joy Ealy, Michael Lyle, Tim Terusa, Rusty Tinsley (dialogue editors)	A&E
2001	Ruby's Bucket of Blood		Doug Kent, Anthony Mazzei (supervising sound editors); Ian Morgan (supervising adr editor); Jane Boegel, John Green, Todd Niesen (sound editors)	Showtime
2001	They Call Me Sirr		Brandon Walker (supervising sound/dialogue editor); Fred Brennan (supervising sound editor); Michele Cook (supervising adr editor); Sue Conley (sound editor)	
2001	The Wandering Soul Murders		Jonas Kuhnemann (supervising dialogue editor), Danielle McBride (sound editor)	Lifetime
2002	Best Sound Editing in Television Long Form – Dialogue & ADR			
2002	Monk	"Mr. Monk and the Candidate"	Peter Austin (supervising sound/adr editor), David Melhase (dialogue/adr editor)	USA
2002	Convicted		Mace Matiosian (supervising sound/dialogue editor); Mark Allen (supervising sound editor); Ruth Adelman (supervising adr editor); Edmund J. Lachmann, Christopher B. Reeves (dialogue/adr editors)	Showtime
2002	Gleason		Mark Linden (supervising sound/adr editor); David Bondelevitch (supervising dialogue editor); Al Decker, Bruce Greenspan, Michael Marion, Tara A. Paul, Carlos Ramirez (dialogue/adr editors)	CBS
2002	The Junction Boys		G. Michael Graham (supervising sound/dialogue editor); Devon Heffley Curry (supervising adr editor); Rick Crampton, Anton Holden, Charlie Kolander, Michael Lyle, Scott A. Tinsley, Rusty Tinsley (dialogue/adr editors)	ESPN
2002	The Pennsylvania Miners' Story		John Benson (supervising sound/dialogue/adr editor); Sonya Henry, Barbara Issak, Ralph Osborn (dialogue/adr editors)	ABC
2002	The Stork Derby		Katherine Fitzgerald (supervising dialogue editor)	Lifetime
2002	Too Young to Be a Dad		Brandon Walker (supervising sound/dialogue editor), Dale Sheldrake (supervising adr editor)	Lifetime
2002	Torso: The Evelyn Dick Story		Marvyn Dennis (supervising dialogue editor)	Lifetime
2002	Taken		David B. Cohn (supervising sound editor); Eileen Horta (supervising adr/dialogue editor); Benjamin Beardwood, Patrick Hogan, Jason Lezama, Ralph Osborn (dialogue editors)	Sci Fi
2003	And Starring Pancho Villa as Himself		Zack Davis (supervising sound/dialogue/adr editor); Geoffrey G. Rubay (supervising sound editor); Lou Kleinman, David Williams (dialogue/adr editors)	HBO
2003	Going for Broke		Brandon Walker (supervising sound editor), Danielle McBride (dialogue/adr editor)	Lifetime
2003	Hitler: The Rise of Evil		Mark Friedgen (supervising sound/dialogue editor); Suzanne Angel (supervising adr editor); Joy Ealy, Kristi Johns, Kathryn Madsen (dialogue/adr editors)	CBS
2003	Salem Witch Trials		David McCallum (supervising sound editor); Janice Ierulli (supervising dialogue/adr editor); Ronayne Higginson (dialogue editor); Fred Brennan, Barry Gilmore, Garrett Kerr, Angie Pajek (adr editors)	CBS
2003	Twelve Mile Road		Mark Friedgen (supervising sound editor); Devon Heffley Curry (supervising adr editor); Anton Holden, Charlie KolandeR, Mark Steele, Tim Terusa (dialogue/adr editorS)	CBS
2003	Julius Caesar		Mark Friedgen (supervising sound/dialogue editor); Suzanne Angel (supervising adr editor); Joy Ealy, Kristi Johns, Kathryn Madsen (dialogue/adr editors)	TNT
2003	The Music Man		Mark Allen, Kelly Oxford (supervising sound editors); Craig S. Jaeger, Tim Kimmel (dialogue/adr editors)	ABC
2003	Saving Jessica Lynch		Robert Webber (supervising sound editor); Suzanne Angel (supervising adr editor); William C. Carruth, Rick Crampton, Devon Heffley Curry, Joy Ealy, Anton Holden, Kathryn Madsen, Tim Terusa, Randal S. Thomas, Rusty Tinsley (dialogue/adr editors)	NBC
2003	Unspeakable		Jeremy Hoenack (supervising sound editor), Steven Erickson (supervising dialogue/adr editor)	
2004	The Life and Death of Peter Sellers		Tim Hands (supervising sound editor), Victoria Brazier (supervising dialogue/adr editor), Zack Davis (dialogue editor/adr editor), Laura Lovejoy (dialogue editor), Anna MacKenzie (adr editor)	HBO
2004	Frankenstein		Trevor Jolly (supervising sound/adr editor), Christopher B. Reeves (supervising dialogue editor), Debby Ruby-Winsberg (adr editor)	USA
2004	Spartacus	"Part 2"	Mark Friedgen (supervising sound editor); Joy Ealy (supervising dialogue editor); Kathryn Madsen (supervising adr editor); William C. Carruth, Rick Crampton, Anton Holden, Mark Steele, Tim Terusa, Randal S. Thomas (dialogue/adr editors)	USA
2004	The Grid	"Part One", "Part Two"	Mark Friedgen (supervising sound editor); Devon Heffley Curry (supervising adr editor); William C. Carruth, Joy Ealy, Charlie Kolander, Mark Steele, Burton Weinstein (dialogue/adr editors)	TNT
2004	The Winning Season		Stephen Grubbs (supervising sound/dialogue/adr editor); Joy Ealy (supervising adr editor); William C. Carruth, Rick Crampton, Anton Holden, Mark Steele, Tim Terusa, Charlie Kolander, Rusty Tinsley (dialogue editors)	TNT
2005	Best Sound Editing in Television: Long Form – Dialogue and Automated Dialogue Replacement			
2005	Lackawanna Blues		Jon Mete (supervising sound editor); Michael Hertlein, Paul Longstaffe (sound editors)	HBO
2005	Category 7: The End of the World		Joe Melody (supervising sound editor); Devon Heffley Curry (supervising adr editor); Mark Steele, Tim Terusa (dialogue editors); J. Michael Hooser, Burton Weinstein (adr editors)	CBS
2005	Into the West	"Manifest Destiny"	G. Michael Graham (supervising sound editor); Kristi Johns (supervising adr editor); William C. Carruth, Anton Holden, Charlie Kolander, Tim Terusa, Rusty Tinsley, Burton Weinstein (dialogue editors)	TNT
2005	Reefer Madness: The Movie Musical		Glenn T. Morgan (supervising sound editor); Dave McMoyler, Margit Pfeiffer (sound editors)	Showtime
2005	Terry		Jonas Kuhnemann (supervising sound editor), Joe Mancuso (dialogue editor), Richard Calistan (adr editor)	CTV
2006	The Path to 9/11		G. Michael Graham (supervising sound editor); J. Michael Hooser (supervising adr editor); Devon Heffley Curry, Joy Ealy, Anton Holden, Adriane Marfiak, Mark Steele (dialogue/adr editors)	ABC
2006	Broken Trail		Kevin Howard (supervising sound editor), Rob Hegedus (supervising dialogue editor), Richard Calistan (supervising adr editor)	AMC
2006	Eight Days to Live		Alastair Gray (supervising sound editor), Richard Calistan (supervising adr editor)	Lifetime
2006	Fallen		David C. Eichhorn (supervising sound editor), Vic Radulich (dialogue/adr editor)	ABC Family
2006	The Year Without a Santa Claus		Gregory M. Gerlich (supervising sound editor); David M. Cowan (supervising dialogue/adr editor); Ginny Cook, Jeremy J. Gordon (dialogue editors)	NBC
2007	Best Sound Editing – Dialogue and ADR for Long Form Television			
2007	Bury My Heart at Wounded Knee		Stephen Hunter Flick, Avram D. Gold (supervising sound editors); Steffan Falesitch, Eric Hertsguaard, Patricio A. Libenson (dialogue editors)	HBO
2007	Big Shots	"Pilot"	Peter Austin (supervising sound editor); Vanessa Lapato (supervising dialogue editor); Mark Allen, Virginia Cook-McGowan, Eric Erickson, Karyn Foster, Hector C. Gika, Sonya Henry, Marc Meyer, Brian Risner, Beth Wiehe (dialogue/adr editors)	ABC
2007	Lost	"Through the Looking Glass"	Thomas DeGorter (supervising sound editor); Maciek Malish (supervising dialogue editor); Jay Keiser (supervising adr editor); Thomas A. Harris, Christopher B. Reeves, Gabrielle Gilbert Reeves (dialogue/adr editors); Scott Weber (sound effects editor)	ABC
2007	Mitch Albom's For One More Day		Scott Hecker, Miguel Rivera (supervising sound editors); Terry Garcia (assistant sound editor)	ABC
2007	Booky and the Secret Santa		Janice Ierulli (supervising sound editor), Richard Calistan (supervising adr editor), Rob Hegedus (dialogue/adr editor)	CTV
2008	Best Sound Editing – Long Form Dialogue and ADR in Television			
2008	Generation Kill	"Get Some"	Stefan Henrix (supervising sound editor); Becki Ponting, Will Ralston (supervising adr editors); Iain Eyre (supervising dialogue editor)	HBO
2008	The Andromeda Strain	"Part 1"	G. Michael Graham (supervising sound/dialogue editor); Devon Heffley Curry (supervising adr editor); Anton Holden, Tim Terusa, Daniel Tripoli (sound editors)	A&E
2008	Fringe	"Pilot"	Bruce M. Honda (supervising sound/dialogue editor); Bob Redpath (supervising sound/adr editor); Christopher B. Reeves (dialogue editor); Virginia Cook-McGowan, David M. Cowan, Mitchell Gettleman, Thomas A. Harris (adr editors)	Fox
2008	The Good Witch		Sue Conley (supervising adr editor)	Hallmark
2008	The Librarian: Curse of the Judas Chalice		Noah Blough (supervising sound/dialogue/adr editor), Chris Winter (dialogue editor)	TNT
2009	Battlestar Galactica	"Daybreak, Part 2"	Daniel Colman, Jack Levy (supervising sound editors); Vince Balunas (supervising dialogue/adr editor)	Sci Fi
2009	An American Girl: Chrissa Stands Strong		Joe Dzuban (supervising sound editor, dialogue editor), Glenn T. Morgan (supervising sound editor), Justin Dzuban (dialogue editor)	HBO
2009	Damages	"Trust Me"	Tim Kimmel (supervising sound editor), Todd Niesen (supervising dialogue editor), Ruth Adelman (supervising adr editor)	FX
2009	House	"Broken"	Brad North (supervising sound/adr editor), Jackie Rodman (supervising dialogue editor)	Fox
2009	Scooby-Doo! The Mystery Begins		Trip Brock (supervising sound editor), Brian S.M. Wroth (dialogue/adr editor), Bryon Speller (dialogue editor)	Cartoon Network

=== 2010s ===
Year	Program	Episode(s)	Nominees	Network
2010	The Pacific	"Basilone"	Tom Bellfort (supervising sound editor); Daniel S. Irwin (supervising dialogue/adr editor); John C. Stuver (dialogue editor); Michael Hertlein, Michelle Pazer, David Williams (adr editors)	HBO
2010	The Walking Dead	"Days Gone Bye"	Walter Newman, Kenneth Young (supervising sound editors); Darleen Stoker (supervising dialogue editor); Lou Thomas (supervising adr editor); Bruce M. Honda (dialogue editor); Skip Schoolnik (adr editor)	AMC
2010	Temple Grandin		Bryan Bowen (supervising sound editor); Vanessa Lapato (supervising dialogue/adr editor); Petra Bach, Paul Curtis (dialogue editors)	HBO
2011	Homeland	"Marine One"	Craig A. Dellinger (supervising sound editor); Jonathan Golodner (sound designer); Jeff Clark, Larry Goeb, Chato Hill, Devin Joseph (dialogue editors)	Showtime
2011	Big Love	"When Men and Mountains Meet"	Susan Cahill (supervising sound editor); Michael Hertlein, Jivan Tahmizian (dialogue editors)	HBO
2011	Cinema Verite		Douglas Murray (supervising sound editor), Susan Dudeck (supervising adr editor), Kim Foscato (dialogue/adr editor)	HBO
2011	Terra Nova	"Occupation/Resistance"	Christopher Harvengt (supervising sound editor), Frank Smathers (supervising dialogue/adr editor)	Fox
2011	The Walking Dead	"What Lies Ahead"	Jerry Ross (supervising sound editor); Lou Thomas (supervising dialogue editor); Steffan Falesitch, Karyn Foster (dialogue editors)	AMC
2012	Game of Thrones	"Valar Morghulis"	Peter Brown (supervising sound editor), Vanessa Lapato (supervising dialogue editor), Kira Roessler (supervising adr editor), Tim Hands (sound editor)	HBO
2012	Coma		David B. Cohn, Bernard Weiser (supervising sound editors); Jon Wakeham (sound editor)	A&E
2012	The Newsroom	"We Just Decided To"	Mark Relyea (supervising sound/adr editor), Robert Guastini (dialogue editor), Ruth Adelman (adr editor)	HBO
2012	Steel Magnolias		Robert Getty (supervising sound editor); Pembrooke Andrews, Chato Hill, Pembrooke Andrews (dialogue editors)	Lifetime
2012	Titanic	"Episode 4"	Jane Tattersall (supervising sound editor), David McCallum (supervising dialogue editor), Tony Currie (supervising adr editor), Sue Conley (sound editor)	ABC
2013	The Bridge	"Pilot"	Mike Marchain (supervising sound/dialogue/adr editor); Robert Guastini, Charlie Kolander, Paul Longstaffe (dialogue editors)	FX
2013	Bonnie & Clyde	"Part 2"	Robert L. Sephton (supervising sound editor); Pembrooke Andrews (supervising dialogue/adr editor); Robert Guastini, Matthew Thomas Hall (dialogue editors)	A&E, History, Lifetime
2013	Dancing on the Edge		Ian Wilkinson (supervising sound/dialogue/adr editor)	PBS
2013	Mob City	"Red Light", "His Banana Majesty"	Matthew E. Taylor (supervising sound editor), Lou Thomas (supervising dialogue editor), Gregg Baxter (dialogue editor)	TNT
2013	Sons of Anarchy	"The Mad King"	Erich Gann (supervising sound/dialogue editor), Joy Ealy (supervising adr editor)	FX
2014	Klondike	"Part 1"	Lee Walpole (supervising sound editor), Jason Lawrence (supervising dialogue editor), Iain Eyre (supervising adr editor)	Discovery
2014	Deliverance Creek		Christopher S. Aud, Gregory M. Gerlich (supervising sound editors); Stephanie Brown (supervising dialogue/adr editor); David M. Cowan (supervising dialogue editor)	Lifetime
2014	Lizzie Borden Took an Ax		Bernard Weiser (supervising sound/dialogue/adr editor), Robert Getty (dialogue/adr editor)	Lifetime
2014	Petals on the Wind		Erich Gann (supervising sound/adr editor), Joe Melody (supervising sound editor)	Lifetime
2014	The Normal Heart		Gary Megregian (supervising sound editor), Jason Krane (dialogue/adr editor)	HBO
2015	Bessie		Damian Volpe (supervising sound editor); Tony Martinez (supervising dialogue/adr editor); Brian Bowles, Mary Ellen Porto (dialogue/adr editors)	HBO
2015	The Book of Negroes	"Episode 1"	David Rose (supervising sound editor); David McCallum (supervising dialogue/adr editor); Martin Gwynn Jones (supervising adr editor); Sue Conley, Brent Pickett (dialogue/adr editors)	BET
2015	Saints & Strangers	"Part 1"	Victor Ray Ennis, Kenneth L. Johnson (supervising sound editors); Brian Armstrong, David Grant (dialogue/adr editors); Scott Ferrara, Lauren E. Price (dialogue editors)	NatGeo
2015	Scream Queens	"Pilot", "Hell Week"	Gary Megregian (supervising sound editor); Jason Krane, Lance Wiseman (dialogue editors)	Fox
2015	Sons of Liberty	"Independence"	Louis Bertini (supervising sound/dialogue/adr editor); Ruy García (supervising sound editor); Nicholas Renbeck, Alexa Zimmerman (dialogue/adr editors)	History
2015	Texas Rising	"Vengeance is Mine"	Tom Bjelic, John Laing (supervising sound editors); Petra Bach (supervising adr editor); Mark Dejczak, Dermain Finlayson, Mark Gingras, Dale Lennon, Jill Purdy (dialogue/adr editors)	History
2015	Tut	"Part One: Power"	Michael J. Benavente (supervising sound/dialogue editor), Craig Mann (supervising sound editor), Chase Keehn (dialogue/adr editor)	Spike
2016	The Night Of	"The Beach"	Nicholas Renbeck (supervising sound editor); Odin Benitez, Sara Stern, Luciano Vignola (dialogue editors); Marissa Littlefield (adr editor)	HBO
2016	Harley and the Davidsons	"Race to the Top"	Jamie Caple (supervising sound editor); Dan Green, Michael Wabro (dialogue editors); Tim Hands (adr editor)	History
2016	Roots	"Part 2"	Gary Megregian (supervising sound editor); Stuart Martin (supervising adr editor); Christian Buenaventura, Steven Stuhr (dialogue editors); Jason Krane (adr editor)	History
2016	Sherlock	"The Abominable Bride"	Doug Sinclair (supervising sound editor, adr editor), Paul McFadden (dialogue editor)	PBS
2016	Westworld	"The Bicameral Mind"	Thomas DeGorter (supervising sound editor); Matt Sawelson (supervising adr editor); Brian Armstrong, Fred Paragano (dialogue editors)	HBO
2017	Outstanding Achievement in Sound Editing – Dialogue and ADR for Episodic Long Form Broadcast Media			
2017	Black Mirror	"USS Callister"	Kenny Clark (supervising sound editor); Michael Maroussas, Matthew Skelding (dialogue editors)	Netflix
2017	The Deuce	"Pilot"	Will Ralston (supervising sound editor), Alexa Zimmerman (dialogue editor), Mary Ellen Porto (adr editor)	HBO
2017	Godless	"Homecoming"	Eric Hoehn, Wylie Stateman (supervising sound editors); Harry Cohen, Hector C. Gika, Sylvain Lasseur, Gregg Swiatlowski (dialogue editors); Leo Marcil, Jackie Zhou (adr editor)	Netflix
2017	Ozark	"The Toll"	Stephen Grubbs (supervising sound/adr editor), Kurt Nicholas Forshager (supervising sound editor), Todd Niesen (dialogue editor)	Netflix
2017	The Long Road Home	"Black Sunday, Part 1"	G.W. Brown, Gregory King (supervising sound editors); Jeffrey Dyal (dialogue editor); James Matheny (adr editor)	NatGeo
2018	Westworld	"The Riddle of the Sphinx"	Thomas DeGorter (supervising sound editor); Brett Hinton (supervising adr editor); Brian Armstrong, Fred Paragano (dialogue editors)	HBO
2018	Better Call Saul	"Winner"	Kurt Nicholas Forshager (supervising sound editor), Kathryn Madsen (supervising adr editor), Jane Boegel (dialogue editor)	AMC
2018	Altered Carbon	"Out of the Past"	Brett Hinton (supervising sound editor), Brian Armstrong (dialogue editor)	Netflix
2018	Bodyguard	"Episode 2"	Dan Johnson (dialogue editor), James Gregory (adr editor)	Netflix
2018	House of Cards	"Chapter 73"	Jeremy Molod (supervising sound editor), Chris Gridley (dialogue editor)	Netflix
2018	Narcos: Mexico	"Just Say No"	Randle Akerson (supervising sound editor), Thomas Whiting (supervising adr editor), David Padilla (dialogue editor)	Netflix
2018	Ozark	"The Gold Coast"	Kurt Nicholas Forshager, Stephen Grubbs (supervising sound editors); Todd Niesen (dialogue editor)	Netflix
2018	Daredevil	"Blindsided"	Lauren Stephens (supervising sound editor), Christian Buenaventura (supervising dialogue/adr editor), Lance Wiseman (dialogue editor) (dialogue editor)	Netflix
2018	The Handmaid's Tale	"The Last Ceremony"	Jane Tattersall (supervising sound editor), David McCallum (supervising dialogue editor), Krystin Hunter (adr editor)	Hulu
2019	Chernobyl	"Please Remain Calm"	Stefan Henrix (supervising sound editor), Harry Barnes (supervising adr editor)	HBO
2019	The Crown	"Aberfan"	Lee Walpole (supervising sound editor), Tom Williams (dialogue editor), Steve Little (adr editor)	Netflix
2019	Peaky Blinders	"Mr. Jones"	Nigel Heath (supervising sound editor), Adele Fletcher (dialogue/adr editor)	Netflix
2019	The Handmaid's Tale	"Mayday"	David McCallum, Jane Tattersall (supervising sound editors); Brent Pickett (dialogue editor); Krystin Hunter (adr editor)	Hulu
2019	The Marvelous Mrs. Maisel	"A Jewish Girl Walks Into the Apollo…"	Ron Bochar (supervising sound editor), Sara Stern (dialogue editor), Ruth Hernandez (adr editor)	Amazon
2019	Succession	"This Is Not for Tears"	Nicholas Renbeck (supervising sound editor); Angela Organ (supervising adr editor); Marlena Grzaslewicz, Bill Orrico (dialogue editors); Lidia Tamplenizza (adr editor)	HBO
2019	True Detective	"The Great War and Modern Memory"	David Esparza, Mandell Winter (supervising sound editors); Micah Loken, Bernard Weiser (dialogue editors)	HBO
2019	Game of Thrones	"The Bells"	Tim Kimmel (supervising sound editor); Tim Hands (supervising adr editor); Paul Bercovitch, John Matter (dialogue editors)	HBO

=== 2020s ===
Year	Program	Episode(s)	Nominees	Network
2020	The Queen's Gambit	"End Game"	Gregg Swiatlowski (supervising sound editor); Eric Hirsch (dialogue editor); Eric Hoehn, Leo Marcel, Wylie Stateman (adr editors)	Netflix
2020	Better Call Saul	"Something Unforgivable"	Nick Forshager (supervising sound editor), Kathryn Madsen (supervising adr editor), Jane Boegel (dialogue editor)	AMC
2020	The Crown	"Fairytale"	Lee Walpole (supervising sound editor); Jeff Richardson (dialogue editor); Steve Little, Tom Williams (adr editors)	Netflix
2020	Dark	"Life and Death"	Alexander Wuertz (supervising sound editor), Thomas Kalbér (supervising dialogue editor), Benjamin Hörbe (supervising adr editor), Gaston Ibarroule (dialogue editor), Clemens Nürnberger (adr editor)	Netflix
2020	Ozark	"All In"	Nick Forshager (supervising sound editor), Todd Niesen (dialogue editor), Stephen Grubbs (adr editor)	Netflix
2020	Fargo	"The Pretend War"	Nick Forshager (supervising sound editor), Todd Niesen (supervising dialogue editor), Tim Boggs (supervising adr editor)	FX
2020	Star Trek: Picard	"The Impossible Box"	Matthew E. Taylor (supervising sound editor), Sean Heissinger (dialogue editor)	CBS All Access
2020	Westworld	"The Mother of Exiles"	Sue Gamsaragan Cahill (supervising sound editor); Jane Boegel-Koch, Tim Tuchrello (dialogue editors)	HBO
2021	Outstanding Achievement in Sound Editing – Series 1 Hour – Comedy or Drama – Dialogue and ADR			
2021	Succession	"Secession"	Nicholas Renbeck (supervising sound editor), Michael Feuser (dialogue editor), Angela Organ (adr editor)	HBO
2021	For All Mankind	"And Here’s to You"	Vince Balunas (supervising sound editor, dialogue/adr editor)	Apple TV+
2021	The Morning Show	"My Least Favorite Year"	Mark Relyea (supervising sound editor), Pernell Salinas (supervising dialogue editor), Julie Altus (supervising adr editor), Robert Guastini (dialogue editor)	Apple TV+
2021	Ted Lasso	"Rainbow"	Brent Findley (supervising sound editor), Bernard Weiser (dialogue editor), Kip Smedley (crowd editor)	Apple TV+
2021	The Handmaid's Tale	"Vows"	David McCallum (supervising sound editor), Krystin Hunter (dialogue editor)	Hulu
2021	The Nevers	"Pilot"	Tim Kimmel (supervising sound editor), John Matter (supervising dialogue editor), Tim Hands (supervising adr editor)	HBO
2021	Squid Game	"VIPS"	Tae-Young Choi, Hye-Young Kang (supervising sound editors); Eun-Ji Ye (supervising dialogue editor); Byung-In Kim (supervising adr editor)	Netflix
2021	Star Trek: Discovery	"Kobayashi Maru"	Matthew E. Taylor (supervising sound editor), Cormac Fudge (supervising dialogue editor, adr editor), Sean Heissinger (supervising sound editor)	Paramount+
2022	Outstanding Achievement in Sound Editing – Broadcast Long Form Dialogue and ADR			
2022	The Crown	"Gunpowder"	Lee Walpole (supervising sound editor); Iain Eyre (supervising dialogue editor); Matt Mewett (supervising ADR editing)	Netflix
2022	Better Call Saul	"Saul Gone"	Nick Forshager, Kathryn Madsen (supervising sound editors); Jane Boegel (dialogue editor)	AMC
2022	Stranger Things	"Chapter Seven: The Massacre at Hawkins Lab"	William Files, Craig Henighan (supervising sound editor); Ryan Cole (dialogue/ADR editor); Korey Pereira, Jill Purdy, David Butler, Polly McKinnon, Rob Chen (dialogue editors)	Netflix
2022	The Lord of the Rings: The Rings of Power	"Udûn"	Robby Stambler, Damian Del Borrello (supervising sound editors); Stefanie Ng (dialogue/ADR supervisor); Ailene Roberts, Ray Beentjes (dialogue editors); Gareth Van Niekirk (ADR group editor)	Prime Video
2022	Severance	"The We We Are"	Jacob Ribicoff (supervising sound editor); David Briggs (ADR editor); Gregg Swiatlowski (dialogue editor)	Apple TV+

== Programs with multiple nominations ==
3 nominations

- The Handmaid's Tale (Hulu)
- Ozark (Netflix)
- Westworld (HBO)

2 nominations

- Better Call Saul (AMC)
- The Crown (Netflix)
- Game of Thrones (HBO)
- Succession (HBO)
- The Walking Dead (AMC)

== See also ==
- List of American television awards
