= Ed Douglas (sound editor) =

Canadian film and television sound editor

Ed Douglas is a Canadian film and television sound editor. He is most noted as a two-time winner of the Canadian Screen Award for Best Sound Editing, winning at the 4th Canadian Screen Awards for Hyena Road, and at the 14th Canadian Screen Awards in 2026 for 40 Acres.

== Awards ==
Award	Date of ceremony	Category	Work	Result	Ref.
Canadian Screen Awards	2016	Best Sound Editing	Hyena Road with Jane Tattersall, David McCallum, Martin Gwynn Jones, Barry Gilmore, David Evans, David Rose, Brennan Mercer, Kevin Banks, Goro Koyama, Andy Malcolm	Won	
Canadian Screen Awards	2023	Best Sound, Fiction	The Porter with David McCallum, Marvyn Dennis, Peter Thillaye, Stefan Fraticelli, Jason Charbonneau, Martin Lee, Graham Rogers, Russ Dyck	Nominated	
Canadian Screen Awards	2026	Best Sound Editing	40 Acres with Dermain Finlayson	Won	
Canadian Screen Awards	2026	Best Sound, Fiction	North of North with Brent Pickett, Peter Murphy, Mark Dejczak, Virginia Storey, Mike Woroniuk, Rob Hegedus, John Dykstra, Gabe Knox	Nominated	
Genie Awards	2000	Best Sound Editing	The Five Senses with Janice Ierulli, Terry Burke, Garrett Kerr, Angie Pajek	Nominated	
