= Canadian Screen Award for Best Sound Editing =

Annual Canadian film award

- Country: Canada
- Presented by: Academy of Canadian Cinema & Television
- First award: 1970
- Currently held by: Ed Douglas & Dermain Finlayson for 40 Acres (2025)
- Website: academy.ca/awards

The Canadian Screen Award for Best Achievement in Sound Editing is awarded by the Academy of Canadian Cinema and Television to the best sound editor on a Canadian film. The award was first presented in 1970 as part of the Canadian Film Awards, before being transitioned to the new Genie Awards in 1980; since 2013 it has been presented as part of the Canadian Screen Awards.

== 1970s ==
Year	Nominees	Film	Ref
1970; 22nd Canadian Film Awards
1970; 22nd Canadian Film Awards	Jean-Pierre Joutel, John Knight	The Act of the Heart	
1971; 23rd Canadian Film Awards
1971; 23rd Canadian Film Awards	No award presented		
1972; 24th Canadian Film Awards
1972; 24th Canadian Film Awards	Honor Griffith, John Kelly	Journey	
1973; 25th Canadian Film Awards
1973; 25th Canadian Film Awards	Alan Lloyd	Slipstream	
1974
1974	No award presented		
1975; 26th Canadian Film Awards
1975; 26th Canadian Film Awards	Kenneth Heeley-Ray	Black Christmas	
1976; 27th Canadian Film Awards
1976; 27th Canadian Film Awards	Maurice Schell	Lies My Father Told Me	
1977; 28th Canadian Film Awards
1977; 28th Canadian Film Awards	Les Halman, Ken Page	One Man	
1978; 29th Canadian Film Awards
1978; 29th Canadian Film Awards	Bruce Nyznik	The Silent Partner	

== 1980s ==
Year	Nominees	Film	Ref
1980; 1st Genie Awards
1980; 1st Genie Awards	Patrick Drummond, Dennis Drummond, Robert Grieve	The Changeling	
1980; 1st Genie Awards	Michael Clark, Brian French	Wild Horse Hank	
1980; 1st Genie Awards	Kenneth Heeley-Ray	Agency	
1980; 1st Genie Awards	Kenneth Heeley-Ray	Murder by Decree	
1980; 1st Genie Awards	Marcel Pothier	Chocolate Eclair (Éclair au chocolat)	
1981; 2nd Genie Awards
1981; 2nd Genie Awards	Jean-Guy Montpetit	The Lucky Star	
1981; 2nd Genie Awards	Kenneth Heeley-Ray, Wayne Griffin, Patrick Drummond	Tribute	
1981; 2nd Genie Awards	Jim Hopkins	The Hounds of Notre Dame	
1981; 2nd Genie Awards	Bruce Nyznik	Final Assignment	
1982; 3rd Genie Awards
1982; 3rd Genie Awards	Peter Thilaye, Andy Malcolm, Peter Jermyn	Heavy Metal	
1982; 3rd Genie Awards	Austin Grimaldi, Joe Grimaldi, Peter Shewchuk, Dino Pigat	The Amateur	
1982; 3rd Genie Awards	Joe Grimaldi, David Appleby, Gary C. Bourgeois, Austin Grimaldi, Ian Hendry, Andy Herman	Funeral Home	
1982; 3rd Genie Awards	Don Cohen, Michel Descombes	Heartaches	
1982; 3rd Genie Awards	Michel Descombes, Patrick Rousseau	The Plouffe Family (Les Plouffe)	
1982; 3rd Genie Awards	Marc Chiasson, Glen Gauthier, Don White, David Appleby, Bruce Carwardine	Ticket to Heaven	
1983; 4th Genie Awards
1983; 4th Genie Awards	Martin Ashbee, Kenneth Heeley-Ray, Kevin Ward, David Evans	Quest for Fire	
1983; 4th Genie Awards	Rod Crawley, Tony Currie, Peter Thilaye, Bruce Nyznik	The Grey Fox	
1983; 4th Genie Awards	Bruce Carwardine, Brian French, Glen Gauthier, Tim Roberts, Brian Rosen	Harry Tracy, Desperado	
1983; 4th Genie Awards	Wayne Griffin, Dennis Drummond	Melanie	
1983; 4th Genie Awards	Bruce Nyznik, Sharon Lackie, Tony Currie	Threshold	
1984; 5th Genie Awards
1984; 5th Genie Awards	Joe Grimaldi, Bruce Carwardine, Austin Grimaldi, Glen Gauthier	The Terry Fox Story	
1984; 5th Genie Awards	Sharon Lackie, Bruce Nyznik, Bernard Bordeleau	The Wars	
1984; 5th Genie Awards	David Evans, Steven Cole, Wayne Griffin, Kenneth Heeley-Ray	A Christmas Story	
1984; 5th Genie Awards	Claude Langlois, Patrick Dodd, Jean-Guy Montpetit	Maria Chapdelaine	
1984; 5th Genie Awards	Marcel Pothier	Just a Game (Rien qu'un jeu)	
1984; 5th Genie Awards	John Kelly, David Evans, Wayne Griffin	Ups and Downs	
1985; 6th Genie Awards
1985; 6th Genie Awards	Charles Bowers, Peter Burgess	The Bay Boy	
1985; 6th Genie Awards	Jim Hopkins	Draw!	
1985; 6th Genie Awards	Claude Langlois, Louise Coté	The Dog Who Stopped the War (La Guerre des tuques)	
1985; 6th Genie Awards	Michael O'Farrell, Peter Thilaye	Isaac Littlefeathers	
1985; 6th Genie Awards	David Evans, Wayne Griffin	Mario	
1985; 6th Genie Awards	Michel B. Bordeleau	That's My Baby!	
1986; 7th Genie Awards
1986; 7th Genie Awards	Robin Leigh, Richard Cadger, Glen Gauthier, Michael O'Farrell, Alan Geldart, Alison Clark, Peter Thilaye	One Magic Christmas	
1986; 7th Genie Awards	Don White, David Appleby, Dan Latour	The Boy in Blue	
1986; 7th Genie Awards	Adrian Croll, Jean-Pierre Joutel, Richard Besse	The Dame in Colour (La Dame en couleurs)	
1986; 7th Genie Awards	Robin Leigh, David Evans, Fred Brennan, Richard Cadger, Penny Hozy, Wayne Griffin	Joshua Then and Now	
1986; 7th Genie Awards	Serge Viau, Paul Dion	The Alley Cat (Le Matou)	
1986; 7th Genie Awards	Jacqueline Cristianini, Alison Clark, Tony Currie, Gordon Thompson	My American Cousin	
1986; 7th Genie Awards	Michael O'Farrell	Samuel Lount	
1987; 8th Genie Awards
1987; 8th Genie Awards	Paul Dion, Diane Boucher, Andy Malcolm	The Decline of the American Empire (Le Déclin de l'empire américain)	
1987; 8th Genie Awards	Sharon Lackie, Peter McBurnie, Peter Thilaye	Loyalties	
1987; 8th Genie Awards	Peter McBurnie, Alison Grace, Sharon Lackie, Michael O'Farrell, Alison Clark	The Pink Chiquitas	
1987; 8th Genie Awards	Andy Malcolm, Paul Dion, Jules Le Noir	Intimate Power (Pouvoir intime)	
1988; 9th Genie Awards
1988; 9th Genie Awards	Viateur Paiement, Marcel Pothier, Diane Boucher	Night Zoo (Un zoo la nuit)	
1988; 9th Genie Awards	Diane Boucher, Marcel Pothier, Viateur Paiement, Jo Caron, Antoine Morin	Brother André (Le Frère André)	
1988; 9th Genie Awards	Robin Leigh, Richard Cadger, Jane Tattersall, Penny Hozy, Peter McBurnie	The Climb	
1988; 9th Genie Awards	Viateur Paiement, Serge Viau, Alain Clavier, Claude Langlois, Louise Coté	The Young Magician (Le jeune magicien)	
1988; 9th Genie Awards	Peter McBurnie, Marta Nielsen Sternberg, Peter Thilaye, Nick Rotundo, Peter Jermyn	Hello Mary Lou: Prom Night II	
1989; 10th Genie Awards
1989; 10th Genie Awards	Terry Burke, Richard Cadger, David Giammarco, Wayne Griffin, David Evans	Dead Ringers	
1989; 10th Genie Awards	Jane Tattersall, Tony Currie, Terry Burke, Marta Nielsen Sternberg, Wayne Griffin	Buying Time	
1989; 10th Genie Awards	David Evans, Kenneth Heeley-Ray, Richard Cadger, Robin Leigh, Drew King	Iron Eagle II	
1989; 10th Genie Awards	Andy Malcolm, Alison Grace, Michael O'Farrell, Peter Thilaye, Penny Hozy	The Kiss	
1989; 10th Genie Awards	Alison Clark, Greg Glynn, Alison Grace, Andy Malcolm, Denise McCormick	A Winter Tan	

== 1990s ==
Year	Nominees	Film	Ref
1990; 11th Genie Awards
1990; 11th Genie Awards	Marcel Pothier, Laurent Lévy, Antoine Morin, Diane Boucher	Jesus of Montreal (Jésus de Montréal)	
1990; 11th Genie Awards	Alan Hardiman, Terry Burke, Barry Backus, Jim Hopkins, Ingrid Rosen	American Boyfriends	
1990; 11th Genie Awards	Alison Fisher, Penny Hozy, Bruno DeGazio, Peter Thilaye, Alison Grace	Bye Bye Blues	
1990; 11th Genie Awards	Paul Dion	In the Belly of the Dragon (Dans le ventre du dragon)	
1990; 11th Genie Awards	Alan Hardiman, Robin Leigh, Jim Hopkins, Penny Hozy, Terry Burke	Millennium	
1990; 11th Genie Awards	Terry Burke, David Templeton, Ralph Brunjes, Brian Ravok	Termini Station	
1991; 12th Genie Awards
1991; 12th Genie Awards	Alison Grace, Gael MacLean, Anne Bakker, Debra Rurak, Cal Shumiatcher	Angel Square	
1991; 12th Genie Awards	Terry Burke, Jim Hopkins, Tony Currie, Charles Bowers, Ellen Adams	Beautiful Dreamers	
1991; 12th Genie Awards	Gudrun Christian, Andy Malcolm, Michelle Cooke, Abby Jack Neidik, Diane Le Floch	Falling Over Backwards	
1991; 12th Genie Awards	Jérôme Décarie, Marcel Pothier, Antoine Morin, Diane Boucher	Moody Beach	
1991; 12th Genie Awards	Gael MacLean, Alison Grace, Mike Keeping, Ingrid Rosen, Anke Bakker	The Legend of Kootenai Brown	
1992; 13th Genie Awards
1992; 13th Genie Awards	Richard Cadger, Wayne Griffin, David Evans, Jane Tattersall, Andy Malcolm, Tony Currie	Naked Lunch	
1992; 13th Genie Awards	Jérôme Décarie, Mathieu Beaudin, Carole Gagnon, Marcel Pothier	Being at Home with Claude	
1992; 13th Genie Awards	Marcel Pothier, Jean-Pierre Lelong, Richard Grégoire, Mathieu Beaudin, Carole Gagnon, Jacques Plante	Léolo	
1992; 13th Genie Awards	Charles O'Shea, Shane Shemko, Cal Shumiatcher, Alison Grace, Marti Richa	North of Pittsburgh	
1992; 13th Genie Awards	Jane Tattersall, Drew King, Wayne Griffin, Tony Currie, Andy Malcolm	South of Wawa	
1992; 13th Genie Awards	Jérôme Décarie, Diane Boucher, Michel Bordeleau, Francine Poirier, Claude Beaugrand	Phantom Life (La Vie fantôme)	
1993; 14th Genie Awards
1993; 14th Genie Awards	Anne Bakker, Gael MacLean, Alison Grace, Maureen Wetteland, Ellen Gram	The Lotus Eaters	
1993; 14th Genie Awards	Shane Shemko, Anke Bakker, Alison Grace, Cam Wagner	Harmony Cats	
1993; 14th Genie Awards	Andy Malcolm, Jane Tattersall, Dale Sheldrake, Penny Hozy, Sean Kelly	I Love a Man in Uniform	
1993; 14th Genie Awards	Marc Chiasson, Terry Burke, Jane Tattersall, Sean Kelly, Drew King, Tony Currie, Diane Boucher	La Florida	
1993; 14th Genie Awards	Jacques Plante, Viateur Paiement, Myriam Poirier, Jérôme Décarie, Antoine Morin	The Sex of the Stars (Le Sexe des étoiles)	
1994; 15th Genie Awards
1994; 15th Genie Awards	Cal Shumiatcher, Eric Hill, Marti Richa, Issac Strozberg, Shane Shemko	Whale Music	
1994; 15th Genie Awards	Sue Conley, Andy Malcolm, Paul Shikata, Peter Winninger, Steve Munro	Exotica	
1994; 15th Genie Awards	Michel B. Bordeleau, Diane Boucher, Natalie Fleurant, Jérôme Décarie	Matusalem	
1994; 15th Genie Awards	Jacques Plante, Antoine Morin, Jérôme Décarie, Michel Arcand	Desire in Motion (Mouvements du désir)	
1994; 15th Genie Awards	Marti Richa, Eric Hill, Shane Shemko, Cal Shumiatcher, Jacqueline Cristianini	Road to Saddle River	
1995; 16th Genie Awards
1995; 16th Genie Awards	Michael Pacek, Michael Werth, Andy Malcolm, Steven Munro, Peter Winniger	Dance Me Outside	
1995; 16th Genie Awards	Jacques Plante, Antoine Morin, Nick Berry, Jérôme Décarie, Diane Boucher	The Confessional (Le Confessionnal)	
1995; 16th Genie Awards	Martin Pinsonnault, Alice Wright, Diane Boucher, Louis Dupire, François Dupire	Black List (Liste noire)	
1995; 16th Genie Awards	Jacqueline Christianini, Sheena Macrae, Anke Bakker, Sean Kelly, Marc Chiasson, Irving Mulch	Magic in the Water	
1995; 16th Genie Awards	Paul Shikata, Tim Roberts, Andy Malcolm, Paul Germann, Steven Munro	The Michelle Apartments	
1996; 17th Genie Awards
1996; 17th Genie Awards	John Douglas Smith, John Laing, Wayne Griffin, Tom Bjelic, Dale Sheldrake, Andy Malcolm, David Evans	Crash	
1996; 17th Genie Awards	Fred Brennan, Daniel Pellerin, Virginia Storey, Paula Fairfield, Yann Delpuech	House	
1996; 17th Genie Awards	Andy Malcolm, David McCallum, Yuri Gorbachow, Jane Tattersall, Fred Brennan, Sue Conley	The Kids in the Hall: Brain Candy	
1996; 17th Genie Awards	Jean-Pierre Pinard, Jérôme Décarie, Serge Fortin, Raymond Vermette, Mario Rodrigue, Jacques Plante	Polygraph (Le Polygraphe)	
1996; 17th Genie Awards	Donna Powell, Janice Ierulli, Rich Harkness, Jane Tattersall, Diane Boucher, Tony Currie	Lilies	
1997; 18th Genie Awards
1997; 18th Genie Awards	Steve Munro, David Drainie Taylor, Sue Conley, Andy Malcolm, Goro Koyama	The Sweet Hereafter	
1997; 18th Genie Awards	Martin Pinsonnault, Alice Wright, Diane Boucher, Louis Dupire, Monique Vézina	Karmina	
1997; 18th Genie Awards	Guy Francoeur, Marcel Pothier, Viateur Paiement, Antoine Morin, Myriam Poirier	The Caretaker's Lodge (La Conciergerie)	
1997; 18th Genie Awards	Marcel Pothier, Guy Pelletier, Myriam Poirier, Mathieu Beaudin, Jérôme Décarie	The Countess of Baton Rouge (La Comtesse de Bâton Rouge)	
1997; 18th Genie Awards	Jérôme Décarie, Mathieu Beaudin, Jacques Plante, Myriam Poirier	The Seat of the Soul (Le siège de l'âme)	
1998; 19th Genie Awards
1998; 19th Genie Awards	Phong Tran, Paul Shikata, Clive Turner, Donna Powell, David Evans, Rick Cadger	Such a Long Journey	
1998; 19th Genie Awards	Jill Purdy, Stephen Barden, Craig Henighan, John Sievert, Sue Conley, John Laing	Cube	
1998; 19th Genie Awards	Paula Fairfield, John Sievert, Tony Currie, Alastair Gray	Regeneration	
1998; 19th Genie Awards	James Genn, Adam Gejdos, James Fonnyadt, Jacqueline Cristianini, Kirby Jinnah, Cam Wagner	Rupert's Land	
1998; 19th Genie Awards	Jacques Plante, Jérôme Décarie, Antoine Morin, Carole Gagnon, Marcel Pothier, Guy Pelletier	The Red Violin	
1999; 20th Genie Awards
1999; 20th Genie Awards	Jane Tattersall, Andy Malcolm, Fred Brennan, David McCallum, Dina Eaton	Sunshine	
1999; 20th Genie Awards	Sue Conley, Steve Munro, Tim Roberts, David Drainie Taylor, Andy Malcolm	Felicia's Journey	
1999; 20th Genie Awards	Louis Dupire, Christian Rivest, Diane Boucher, Jérôme Décarie, Alice Wright	The Last Breath (Le Dernier souffle)	
1999; 20th Genie Awards	Donna Powell, Rick Cadger, Alastair Gray, Clive Turner	The Divine Ryans	
1999; 20th Genie Awards	Ed Douglas, Garrett Kerr, Janice Ierulli, E. Angie Pajek, Terry Burke	The Five Senses	

== 2000s ==
Year	Nominees	Film	Ref
2000; 21st Genie Awards
2000; 21st Genie Awards	Fred Brennan, Jane Tattersall, Susan Conley, Robert Warchol, Garrett Kerr, Steven Hammond, David McCallum	Love Come Down	
2000; 21st Genie Awards	Maija Burnett, Brendan Ostrander, Kris Fenske, John Ludgate, Dean Giammarco	Here's to Life!	
2000; 21st Genie Awards	Carole Gagnon, Mathieu Beaudin, Antoine Morin, Francois Senneville, Jérôme Décarie	Maelström	
2000; 21st Genie Awards	Michel Bordeleau, Pierre-Jules Audet, Marc Gagnon, Jérôme Décarie, Natalie Fleurant	The Art of War	
2000; 21st Genie Awards	Paul Hubert, Steven Gurman, Richard Betanzos, Glenn Tussman, Vincent Regaudie, Michael Gurman	To Walk with Lions	
2001; 22nd Genie Awards
2001; 22nd Genie Awards	John Sievert, Stephen Barden, Joe Bracciale, Kevin Banks, Virginia Storey	Treed Murray	
2001; 22nd Genie Awards	Donna Powell, Mishann Lau, Robert Warchol, David McCallum, Jane Tattersall, Fred Brennan, Garrett Kerr	Ginger Snaps	
2001; 22nd Genie Awards	Marcel Pothier, Mathieu Beaudin, Jacques Plante, Jérôme Décarie, Claire Pochon	Karmina 2	
2001; 22nd Genie Awards	Gina Mueller, Michael P. Keeping, Patrick Haskill, Gael MacLean, Jim Harrington	Marine Life	
2001; 22nd Genie Awards	Dominik Pagacz, Marcel Pothier, Carole Gagnon, Jacques Plante, Guy Francoeur	A Girl at the Window (Une jeune fille à la fenêtre)	
2002; 23rd Genie Awards
2002; 23rd Genie Awards	Andy Malcolm, Fred Brennan, Barry Gilmore, David McCallum, Goro Koyama, Roderick Deogrades, Jane Tattersall	Max	
2002; 23rd Genie Awards	Louis Collin, Denis Saindon, Natalie Fleurant	Inside (Histoire de pen)	
2002; 23rd Genie Awards	Tchae Measroch, Diane Boucher, Louis Dupire, Christian Rivest, Alice Wright	The Collector (Le Collectionneur)	
2002; 23rd Genie Awards	Donna Powell, David Evans, Paul Steffler, Harvey Hyslop	Rare Birds	
2002; 23rd Genie Awards	Goro Koyama, David Evans, Wayne Griffin, Andy Malcolm, Tony Currie	Spider	
2003; 24th Genie Awards
2003; 24th Genie Awards	John Laing, Jill Purdy, Andy Malcolm, Paul Intson, Goro Koyama, Michael O'Farrell, John Douglas Smith, Mark Gingras	The Statement	
2003; 24th Genie Awards	Graham Jones, Jane Tattersall, Ronayne Higginson, Steven Hammond, David McCallum, David Rose	Falling Angels	
2003; 24th Genie Awards	Guy Francoeur, Marcel Pothier, Carole Gagnon, Jacques Plante, Antoine Morin	Seducing Doctor Lewis (La Grande séduction)	
2003; 24th Genie Awards	Marie-Claude Gagné, Jérôme Décarie, Mireille Morin, Claire Pochon, Diane Boucher, Jean-Philippe Savard	The Barbarian Invasions (Les Invasions barbares)	
2003; 24th Genie Awards	Maureen Murphy, Dean Giammarco, Robert Hunter, Johnny Ludgate, Christine McLeod	The Snow Walker	
2004; 25th Genie Awards
2004; 25th Genie Awards	Steve Baine, Craig Henighan, Jill Purdy, Tony Lewis, Stephen Barden, Nathan Robitaille	Resident Evil: Apocalypse	
2004; 25th Genie Awards	Guy Pelletier, Claire Pochon, Marie-Claude Gagné, Jean-Philippe Savard, Guy Francoeur	Happy Camper (Camping sauvage)	
2004; 25th Genie Awards	Guy Pelletier, Marcel Pothier, Guy Francoeur, Antoine Morin, Natalie Fleurant	Head in the Clouds	
2004; 25th Genie Awards	Hélène Verreau, Valéry Dufort-Boucher, Christian Rivest, Alice Wright, Tchae Measroch	The Last Tunnel (Le Dernier tunnel)	
2004; 25th Genie Awards	Marcel Pothier, Carole Gagnon, Natalie Fleurant, Guy Francoeur, Antoine Morin	Machine Gun Molly (Monica la mitraille)	
2005; 26th Genie Awards
2005; 26th Genie Awards	Mira Mailhot, Martin Pinsonnault, Mireille Morin, Jean-François Sauvé, Simon Meilleur	C.R.A.Z.Y.	
2005; 26th Genie Awards	Michael McCann, Chester Bialowas, Tony Gort, Roger Morris, Michael Thomas	It's All Gone Pete Tong	
2005; 26th Genie Awards	Jean-François Sauvé, Simon Meilleur, Diane Boucher, Francine Poirier, Olivier Calvert	Audition (L'Audition)	
2005; 26th Genie Awards	Bruce Little, Russ Dyck	Seven Times Lucky	
2005; 26th Genie Awards	Alice Wright, Valéry Dufort-Boucher, Alexis Farand, Jacques Plante, Christian Rivest	The Outlander (Le Survenant)	
2006; 27th Genie Awards
2006; 27th Genie Awards	Claude Beaugrand, Olivier Calvert, Jérôme Décarie, Natalie Fleurant, Francine Poirier	The Rocket	
2006; 27th Genie Awards	Jane Tattersall, Barry Gilmore, David McCallum, Donna Powell, David Rose	Beowulf & Grendel	
2006; 27th Genie Awards	Christian Rivest, Valéry Dufort-Boucher, Tchae Measroch, Louis Molinas, Hélène Verreau	Bon Cop, Bad Cop	
2006; 27th Genie Awards	Pierre-Jules Audet, Guy Francoeur, Guy Pelletier	Cheech	
2006; 27th Genie Awards	Marie-Claude Gagné, Guy Francoeur, Claire Pochon, Jean-Philippe Savard	A Sunday in Kigali (Un dimanche à Kigali)	
2007; 28th Genie Awards
2007; 28th Genie Awards	Wayne Griffin, Rob Bertola, Tony Currie, Goro Koyama, Michael O'Farrell	Eastern Promises	
2007; 28th Genie Awards	Martin Pinsonnault, Pierre-Jules Audet, Michelle Cloutier, Simon Meilleur, Louis Molinas	Nitro	
2007; 28th Genie Awards	Marie-Claude Gagné, Diane Boucher, Guy Francoeur, Claire Pochon, Jean-Philippe Savard	Gounod's Roméo et Juliette	
2007; 28th Genie Awards	Marcel Pothier, Guy Francoeur, Antoine Morin, Guy Pelletier, François B. Senneville	Shake Hands with the Devil	
2007; 28th Genie Awards	Steve Munro, Paul Shikata, John Sievert, David Drainie Taylor	The Tracey Fragments	
2008; 29th Genie Awards
2008; 29th Genie Awards	Jane Tattersall, Kevin Banks, Barry Gilmore, Andy Malcolm, David Rose	Passchendaele	
2008; 29th Genie Awards	Robert LaBrosse, France Lévesque, Guy Francoeur, Lucie Fortier, Lori Paquet	The Broken Line (La ligne brisée)	
2008; 29th Genie Awards	François B. Senneville, Antoine Morin, Carole Gagnon	Le Banquet	
2008; 29th Genie Awards	Jean-François Sauvé, Natalie Fleurant, Jérôme Décarie, Claude Beaugrand	The American Trap (Le Piège américain)	
2008; 29th Genie Awards	Nelson Ferreira, Lee de Lang, Nathan Robitaille	This Beautiful City	
2009; 30th Genie Awards
2009; 30th Genie Awards	Claude Beaugrand, Guy Francoeur, Carole Gagnon, Christian Rivest	Polytechnique	
2009; 30th Genie Awards	Pierre-Jules Audet, Michelle Cloutier, Jacques Plante, Jean-François Sauvé, Nicolas Gagnon	The Master Key (Grande Ourse: La Clé des possibles)	
2009; 30th Genie Awards	Mathieu Beaudin, Jérôme Décarie, Jacques Plante	5150 Elm's Way (5150, rue des Ormes)	
2009; 30th Genie Awards	Garrett Kerr, Fred Brennan, Paul Germann, Steve Hammond, Mishann Lau	Nurse.Fighter.Boy	
2009; 30th Genie Awards	Olivier Calvert, Natalie Fleurant, Francine Poirier, Lise Wedlock	Babine	

== 2010s ==
Year	Nominees	Film	Ref
2010; 31st Genie Awards
2010; 31st Genie Awards	Sylvain Bellemare, Simon Meilleur, Claire Pochon	Incendies	
2010; 31st Genie Awards	Pierre-Jules Audet, Michelle Cloutier, Natalie Fleurant, Nicolas Gagnon	7 Days (Les 7 jours du Talion)	
2010; 31st Genie Awards	Stephen Barden, Steve Baine, Kevin Banks, Alex Bullick, Jill Purdy	Resident Evil: Afterlife	
2010; 31st Genie Awards	Mark Gingras, Tom Bjelic, Katrijn Halliday, Dale Lennon, John Smith	Defendor	
2010; 31st Genie Awards	David Rose, David McCallum	Splice	
2011; 32nd Genie Awards
2011; 32nd Genie Awards	Wayne Griffin, Rob Bertola, Tony Currie, Andy Malcolm, Michael O'Farrell	A Dangerous Method	
2011; 32nd Genie Awards	Fred Brennan, James Bastable, Gabe Knox, John Sievert	You Are Here	
2011; 32nd Genie Awards	Claude Beaugrand, Olivier Calvert, Natalie Fleurant, Francine Poirier	Wetlands (Marécages)	
2011; 32nd Genie Awards	Martin Pinsonnault, Blaise Blanchier, Simon Meilleur, Mireille Morin, Luc Raymond	Café de Flore	
2011; 32nd Genie Awards	Jeremy MacLaverty, Daniel Pellerin, Geoff Raffan, Jan Rudy, John Sievert, James Mark Stewart	In Darkness	
2012; 1st Canadian Screen Awards
2012; 1st Canadian Screen Awards	Martin Pinsonnault, Jean-François Sauvé, Simon Meilleur, Claire Pochon	War Witch (Rebelle)	
2012; 1st Canadian Screen Awards	Pierre-Jules Audet, Michelle Cloutier, Thierry Bourgault D'Amico, Nathalie Fleurant, Cédrick Marin	L'Affaire Dumont	
2012; 1st Canadian Screen Awards	Stephen Barden, Steve Baine, Kevin Banks, Alex Bullick, Jill Purdy	Resident Evil: Retribution	
2012; 1st Canadian Screen Awards	Sylvain Brassard, Stéphane Cadotte, Isabelle Favreau, Philippe Racine	Laurence Anyways	
2012; 1st Canadian Screen Awards	Allan Scarth, Bob Melanson, Zander Rosborough, Cory Tetford	The Disappeared	
2013; 2nd Canadian Screen Awards
2013; 2nd Canadian Screen Awards	Alex Bullick, Christian Schaaning, J.R. Fountain, Jill Purdy, Kevin Banks, Nathan Robitaille, Nelson Ferreira, Stephen Barden, Steve Baine	The Mortal Instruments: City of Bones	
2013; 2nd Canadian Screen Awards	Sylvain Bellemare	Gabrielle	
2013; 2nd Canadian Screen Awards	Guy Francoeur, Isabelle Favreau, Sylvain Brassard	Tom at the Farm (Tom à la ferme)	
2013; 2nd Canadian Screen Awards	Antoine Morin, Christian Rivest, Guy Pelletier, Martin Pinsonnault, Mireille Morin, Paul Col	Louis Cyr	
2014; 3rd Canadian Screen Awards
2014; 3rd Canadian Screen Awards	Steve Baine, Kevin Banks, Stephen Barden, Fred Brennan, Alex Bullick, J.R. Fountain, Kevin Howard, Jill Purdy	Pompeii	
2014; 3rd Canadian Screen Awards	Elma Bello	Fall	
2014; 3rd Canadian Screen Awards	Christian Rivest	Henri Henri	
2014; 3rd Canadian Screen Awards	Raymond Legault, Simon Meilleur, Martin Pinsonnault, Claire Pochon	Meetings with a Young Poet	
2014; 3rd Canadian Screen Awards	Sylvain Brassard, Benoît Dame, Isabelle Favreau, Guy Francoeur	Mommy	
2015; 4th Canadian Screen Awards
2015; 4th Canadian Screen Awards	Jane Tattersall, David McCallum, Martin Gwynn Jones, Barry Gilmore, David Evans, David Rose, Brennan Mercer, Ed Douglas, Kevin Banks, Goro Koyama, Andy Malcolm	Hyena Road	
2015; 4th Canadian Screen Awards	Benoît Dame	Adrien (Le Garagiste)	
2015; 4th Canadian Screen Awards	Sylvain Bellemare, Claire Pochon, Jérôme Décarie, François Senneville	Endorphine	
2015; 4th Canadian Screen Awards	Mark Gingras, Jill Purdy	Forsaken	
2015; 4th Canadian Screen Awards	John Gurdebeke, David Rose	The Forbidden Room	
2016; 5th Canadian Screen Awards
2016; 5th Canadian Screen Awards	Pierre-Jules Audet, Jérôme Décarie, Michelle Cloutier, Stan Sakell, Jean-François Sauvé, Mathieu Beaudin, François Senneville, Luc Raymond, Jean-Philippe Saint-Laurent	Race	
2016; 5th Canadian Screen Awards	Sylvain Brassard, Guy Francoeur, Benoît Dame, Guy Pelletier	It's Only the End of the World (Juste la fin du monde)	
2016; 5th Canadian Screen Awards	Sylvain Brassard, Guy Pelletier, Christian Rivest	King Dave	
2016; 5th Canadian Screen Awards	Matt Chan, James Patrick, Frieda Bay	Operation Avalanche	
2016; 5th Canadian Screen Awards	Miguel Nunes, Ryan Thompson, Gina Mueller, Maureen Murphy	The Unseen	
2017; 6th Canadian Screen Awards
2017; 6th Canadian Screen Awards	Nelson Ferreira, John Elliot, J. R. Fountain, Dashen Naidoo, Tyler Whitham	The Breadwinner	
2017; 6th Canadian Screen Awards	Claude Beaugrand	Hochelaga, Land of Souls (Hochelaga, terre des âmes)	
2017; 6th Canadian Screen Awards	Sylvain Bellemare	All You Can Eat Buddha	
2017; 6th Canadian Screen Awards	Marie-Claude Gagné	Bon Cop, Bad Cop 2	
2017; 6th Canadian Screen Awards	Christian Rivest, Antoine Morin, Thibaud Quinchon, Guy Pelletier, Guy Francœur	Goon: Last of the Enforcers	
2018; 7th Canadian Screen Awards
2018; 7th Canadian Screen Awards	Frédéric Cloutier	The Great Darkened Days (La grande noirceur)	
2018; 7th Canadian Screen Awards	Louis Desparois	The Nest (Le nid)	
2018; 7th Canadian Screen Awards	Martin Pinsonnault	Just a Breath Away (Dans la brume)	
2018; 7th Canadian Screen Awards	Christian Rivest, Stéphane Bergeron, Guy Pelletier	Racetime (La Course des tuques)	
2018; 7th Canadian Screen Awards	Lee Walpole, Thomas Huhn	Stockholm	
2019; 8th Canadian Screen Awards
2019; 8th Canadian Screen Awards	Francine Poirier, Claude Beaugrand, Michel B. Bordeleau, Raymond Legault, Lise Wedlock, Natalie Fleurant	The Song of Names	
2019; 8th Canadian Screen Awards	Paul Germann, Claire Dobson, John Sievert, Jason Charbonneau, Randy Wilson	Disappearance at Clifton Hill	
2019; 8th Canadian Screen Awards	Krystin Hunter, Brent Pickett, Paul Germann, Goro Koyama, Sandra Fox	Goalie	
2019; 8th Canadian Screen Awards	Dashen Naidoo, Tyler Whitham, Stephen Barden, Scott Donald, Nelson Ferreira	Lucky Day	
2019; 8th Canadian Screen Awards	Nelson Ferreira, Dashen Naidoo, J.R. Fountain, Dustin Harris	Run This Town	

== 2020s ==
Year	Nominee	Film	Ref
2020; 9th Canadian Screen Awards
2020; 9th Canadian Screen Awards	David McCallum, David Rose, Krystin Hunter, William Kellerman	Akilla's Escape	
2020; 9th Canadian Screen Awards	Matthew Chan, Ida Marci	Violation	
2020; 9th Canadian Screen Awards	Paul Germann, Brennan Mercer, Martin Gwynn Jones	The Nest	
2020; 9th Canadian Screen Awards	James Sizemore, Jane Tattersall, David McCallum, Steve Medeiros, Krystin Hunter, Stefan Fraticelli, Jason Charbonneau	Funny Boy	
2020; 9th Canadian Screen Awards	Clive Turner, Mark Shniruwsky, Marvyn Dennis	Random Acts of Violence	
2021; 10th Canadian Screen Awards
2021; 10th Canadian Screen Awards	Krystin Hunter, Paul Germann, Stefana Fratila	Scarborough	
2021; 10th Canadian Screen Awards	J. R. Fountain, Nelson Ferreira, Mark Dejczak, Robert Hegedus, Steve Hammond	PAW Patrol: The Movie	
2021; 10th Canadian Screen Awards	Martin Gwynn Jones, Brent Pickett, Jane Tattersall, Brennan Mercer	All My Puny Sorrows	
2021; 10th Canadian Screen Awards	Sean Karp, Blag Ahilov, Will Preventis, Noah Siegel, Jakob Thiesen, Igor Bezuglov	Dino Dana: The Movie	
2021; 10th Canadian Screen Awards	Daniel Pellerin, Jeremy Fong, Kristi McIntyre	Kicking Blood	
2022; 11th Canadian Screen Awards
2022; 11th Canadian Screen Awards	Jane Tattersall, David McCallum, Paul Germann, Krystin Hunter, Kevin Banks	Brother	
2022; 11th Canadian Screen Awards	Sylvain Bellemare, Simon Meilleur, Frédéric Lavigne, Francis Gauthier, Claire Pochon	Viking	
2022; 11th Canadian Screen Awards	Elma Bello, Davi Aquino	Stay the Night	
2022; 11th Canadian Screen Awards	Robert Bertola, Tom Bjelic, Jill Purdy	Crimes of the Future	
2022; 11th Canadian Screen Awards	Martin Gwynn Jones	Dawn, Her Dad and the Tractor	
2023; 12th Canadian Screen Awards
2023; 12th Canadian Screen Awards	Matthew Chan, Gabe Knox, Michelle Irving, Lucas Prokaziuk, Stefan Fraticelli, Jason Charbonneau	BlackBerry	
2023; 12th Canadian Screen Awards	Pierre-Jules Audet, Marie-Miel Lacasse Hévey, Monique Vézina, Natalie Fleurant	Ru	
2023; 12th Canadian Screen Awards	John Blerot	Hands That Bind	
2023; 12th Canadian Screen Awards	Alex Bullick, Jill Purdy, Rob Bertola, Craig MacLellan	Infinity Pool	
2023; 12th Canadian Screen Awards	J.R. Fountain	PAW Patrol: The Mighty Movie	
2024; 13th Canadian Screen Awards
2024; 13th Canadian Screen Awards	Robert Bertola, Jill Purdy, David Rose, Paul Germann, Steve Baine, Fraser Gee	The Shrouds	
2024; 13th Canadian Screen Awards	Tim Atkins, Michelle Hwu	In a Violent Nature	
2024; 13th Canadian Screen Awards	Elma Bello, Bret Killoran, Chris Russell	Darkest Miriam	
2024; 13th Canadian Screen Awards	Gabe Knox, Lucas Prokaziuk, Stefan Fraticelli, Justin Helle	Matt and Mara	
2024; 13th Canadian Screen Awards	Tyler Whitham, Joseph Fraioli, Kevin Banks, Dashen Naidoo, Davi Aquino, Claire Dobson, Krystin Hunter, Dustin Harris, Stefan Fraticelli, Jason Charbonneau, William Kellerman	Code 8: Part II	
2025; 14th Canadian Screen Awards
2025; 14th Canadian Screen Awards	Ed Douglas, Dermain Finlayson	40 Acres	
2025; 14th Canadian Screen Awards	Elma Bello, Gabe Knox, James Bastable, Michelle Irving	Mile End Kicks	
2025; 14th Canadian Screen Awards	Matthew Chan, Bret Killoran, Gabriella Wallace	Honey Bunch	
2025; 14th Canadian Screen Awards	Christopher Russell, Joe Scandella, Josh Fagen, Louis Duranleau	The Well	
2025; 14th Canadian Screen Awards	Jane Tattersall, Sue Conley, David Evans	Out Standing	

== See also ==
- Prix Iris for Best Sound
