= Dermain Finlayson =

Canadian film and television sound editor

Dermain Finlayson is a Canadian film and television sound editor. He is most noted for his work on the 2024 film 40 Acres, for which he and Ed Douglas won the Canadian Screen Award for Best Sound Editing at the 14th Canadian Screen Awards in 2026.

== Awards ==
Award	Date of ceremony	Category	Work	Result	Ref.
Canadian Screen Awards	2016	Best Sound in a Variety or Animated Program or Series	Pirate's Passage with Mark Gingras, Adam Stein, John Laing, Keith Elliot, Rudy Michael	Nominated	
Canadian Screen Awards	2026	Best Sound Editing	40 Acres with Ed Douglas	Won	
Directors Guild of Canada	2012	DGC Team Award, Short Film	Patch Town with Catherine Gourdier, David Sparkes, Barbara McCullam, Diana Young, Michael Doherty, Dale Lennon, Matt Middleton, Robert Nowacki, Joel Richardson	Won	
Directors Guild of Canada	2012	Best Sound Editing, Television Movie or Miniseries	Committed with Tom Bjelic, John Douglas Smith, James Robb	Nominated	
Directors Guild of Canada	2013	DGC Team Award, Short Film	Frost with Bob Munroe, Patrick Hagarty, Jesse Katzev, Orlee Buium, Michael Torelli, Adam Stein, James McAteer, Jason McQuarrie, Guy Dube, Rosalie Mackintosh	Nominated	
Directors Guild of Canada	2014	DGC Team Award, Comedy Television Series	Satisfaction with Keith Samples, Mark Reid, Michael J. Bowman, Stephen Bélanger, Elliott Ell, Jordan Roy, Sam Mantini, Rupert Lazarus, Sean Breaugh, Andra Fay Butler, John MacNeil, Matt Middleton, Beau Turner, Joyce McPherson, Jeff Smith, Yim Hung Kung, Malcolm McCulloch, Keith Park, Craig Webster, Majda Drinnan, John Laing, Tom Bjelic, Adam Stein, James Robb, Andrea H. Greaney, Dawn Howat, Will Taylor, Heather Schmitt	Nominated	
Directors Guild of Canada	2014	Sound Editing in a Television Series	Satisfaction with Tom Bjelic, James Robb, Adam Stein	Nominated	
Directors Guild of Canada	2015	Best Sound Editing in a Television Movie or Miniseries	The Hazing Secret with Mark Gingras, Katie Halliday, John Laing, Mark Dejczak, James Robb	Nominated	
Directors Guild of Canada	2015	Best Sound Editing in a Television Movie or Miniseries	Best Christmas Party Ever with Mark Gingras, Katie Halliday, John Laing, Dale Lennon, James Robb	Nominated	
Directors Guild of Canada	2017	Best Sound Editing in a Television Movie or Miniseries	Surviving Compton: Dre, Suge & Michel'le with Tom Bjelic, John Laing, Dale Lennon, Michael Mancuso, James Robb, Kevin Banks	Nominated	
Directors Guild of Canada	2023	Outstanding Sound Editing, Comedy or Family Series	Home Sweet Rome! with Ryan Birnberg, Mark Gingras	Nominated	
Directors Guild of Canada	2025	Best Sound Editing in a Feature Film	40 Acres with Ed Douglas	Won	
Golden Reel Awards	2015	Outstanding Achievement in Sound Editing – Series 1 Hour – Dialogue/ADR	Texas Rising	Nominated	
Primetime Emmy Awards	2012	Outstanding Sound Editing for a Limited or Anthology Series, Movie or Special	Hatfields & McCoys with Tom Bjelic, John Laing, John Douglas Smith, Mark Dejczak, Michael Mancuso, Kevin Banks, Darrell Hall, Alex Bullick, Nathan Robitaille, Dan Kiener, Emilie Boucek, Steve Baine	Nominated	
Primetime Emmy Awards	2015	Outstanding Sound Editing for a Limited or Anthology Series, Movie or Special	Texas Rising with John Laing, Tom Bjelic, Alex Bullick, Tyler Whitham, Michael Mancuso, Adam Stein, Petra Bach, Jill Purdy, Mark Dejczak, Mark Gingras, Dale Lennon, Kevin Banks, Jim Harrison, Steve Baine, Simon Meilleur	Nominated	
