= Akilla's Escape =

2020 Canadian drama film

- Film poster
- Directed by: Charles Officer
- Written by: Charles Officer; Wendy Motion Brathwaite
- Produced by: Jake Yanowski
- Starring: Saul Williams; Thamela Mpumlwana; Donisha Prendergast; Vic Mensa
- Cinematography: Maya Bankovic
- Edited by: Andres Landau
- Music by: Robert Del Naja; Saul Williams
- Production company: Canesugar Filmworks
- Distributed by: Vertical Entertainment; Level Film
- Release date: September 12, 2020 (TIFF)
- Running time: 90 minutes
- Countries: Canada; United States
- Language: English

Akilla's Escape is a 2020 drama film, directed by Charles Officer, his final feature prior to his death in 2023. The film stars Saul Williams as Akilla, a marijuana dealer retiring from the business following legalization, who tries to rescue a young boy (Thamela Mpumlwana) from being drawn into a life of crime.

The film, which Officer began writing in 2010, was inspired by the police crackdown on the Toronto chapter of the Shower Posse crime gang. Its cast also includes Vic Mensa, Oluniké Adeliyi, Donisha Prendergast, Ronnie Rowe, Theresa Tova, Brandon Oakes, Sagine Sémajuste and Colm Feore. The film's original score is produced by Saul Williams with Robert Del Naja of Massive Attack.

The film premiered at the 2020 Toronto International Film Festival, with further screenings at the Vancouver International Film Festival, the Atlanta International Film Festival, the Santa Barbara International Film Festival, The Trinidad & Tobago Film Festival, and Hof International Film Festival. The film was nominated for 8 Canadian Screen Awards and won 5 Canadian Screen Awards in total.

== Reception ==
On the review aggregator website Rotten Tomatoes, 79% of 48 critics' reviews are positive, with an average rating of 6.8/10. The website's consensus reads: "Akilla's Escape occasionally loses sight of its strongest assets, but solid acting and a smart story make this a neo-noir worth watching."

Writing for Now and The Georgia Straight, Norman Wilner wrote that "Officer does something else with Akilla’s Escape that I’m hesitant to discuss, but when you see it you’ll hopefully be as stunned and impressed as I was. It’s not a plot twist, but rather a creative decision that pays off absolutely brilliantly over the course of the movie, giving flesh to its central metaphor and making the story play on at least two different levels above and beyond what happens in the narrative."

The Los Angeles Times wrote "The film remains firmly rooted in Williams' quietly powerful and laser focused performance."

The Film Stage included it in their list of "The Best Films from Venice, TIFF, and NYFF 2020", and the Toronto Star named it as one of the ten best films at the festival.

=== Awards and nominations ===
Award	Date of ceremony	Category	Nominees	Result	Reference
Victoria Film Festival	February 14, 2021	Best Canadian Feature	Akilla's Escape	Won	
Directors Guild of Canada Awards		Achievement in Production Design	Akilla's Escape	Won	
Canadian Screen Awards	May 20, 2021	Best Actor	Saul Williams	Nominated	
Canadian Screen Awards	May 20, 2021	Best Supporting Actor	Thamela Mpumlwana	Nominated	
Canadian Screen Awards	May 20, 2021	Best Supporting Actor	Ronnie Rowe Jr.	Nominated	
Canadian Screen Awards	May 20, 2021	Best Original Screenplay	Charles Officer, Wendy Motion Brathwaite	Won	
Canadian Screen Awards	May 20, 2021	Best Cinematography	Maya Bankovic	Won	
Canadian Screen Awards	May 20, 2021	Best Sound Editing	Dave Rose, David McCallum, Krystin Hunter, William Kellerman	Won	
Canadian Screen Awards	May 20, 2021	Best Sound Mixing	Brad Dawe, James Bastable, Graham Rogers, Daniel Moctezuma	Won	
Canadian Screen Awards	May 20, 2021	Best Casting	Nicole Hilliard-Forde	Won	
