= Hyena Road =

2015 Canadian war drama film by Paul Gross

- Film poster
- Directed by: Paul Gross
- Written by: Paul Gross
- Produced by: Niv Fichman; Paul Gross
- Starring: Rossif Sutherland; Paul Gross; Christine Horne; Nabil Elouahabi; Neamat Arghandabi; Allan Hawco; Clark Johnson
- Cinematography: Karim Hussain
- Edited by: David Wharnsby
- Music by: Asher Lenz
- Production companies: Rhombus Media; Buffalo Gal Pictures; Bron Creative; WT Films; Triple 7 Films
- Distributed by: Elevation Pictures
- Release dates: 14 September 2015 (TIFF); 9 October 2015 (Canada)
- Running time: 120 minutes
- Country: Canada
- Language: English

Hyena Road is a 2015 Canadian war drama film directed, written and produced by Paul Gross, starring Gross and Rossif Sutherland. It was shown in the Gala Presentations section of the 2015 Toronto International Film Festival. The film was shown on 24 September 2015, at the Calgary Film Festival, before a general release on 9 October. It won three Canadian Screen Awards.

The film is based on the true story of "Route Hyena" (formerly named Route Fosters) which was built by Task Force Kandahar between 2008 and 2011 during the War in Afghanistan, which over various rotations involved many units across the Canadian Armed Forces. For this English-language film, the units are shown to be from Western Canada, based on Princess Patricia's Canadian Light Infantry, an English-language regiment stationed in Western Canada.

== Plot ==
In Kandahar Province, Afghanistan, Canadian Army troops are encountering resistance from insurgents as they construct "Hyena Road" deep into Taliban territory.

Warrant Officer Ryan Sanders, the leader of a sniper section, finds himself under heavy fire while on sentry duty on the road. After their assigned evacuation vehicles are unable to reach their location, the section moves on foot and reaches a Pashtun village. They are harboured by a tribal elder (who has eyes of two different colours, one brown and the other blue) in his home, who sends the Taliban away after they attack the village while searching for the Canadians.

Sanders and his section evacuate the area and return to base, where his secret lover Captain Jennifer Bowman, an officer in the Princess Patricia's Canadian Light Infantry (PPCLI), is also stationed.

Meanwhile, Captain Pete Mitchell, an Intelligence Branch officer, carries out normal duties as the road is constructed, with little help from the Afghan National Army (ANA). When he hears Sanders' story of the Afghan elder, he decides to search for the man as a potential ally. He is helped in his search by a local asset assisting against the Taliban, called "The Cleaner".

While a search of the village yields nothing, Mitchell believes the man to be "the Ghost", a former militant who fought against the Soviets in the Soviet-Afghan War who gained his nickname for disappearing every time he was wounded, as his comrades would take him across the mountains into Pakistan to recover, out of the range of the Soviet military.

Mitchell eventually arranges a meeting with the Ghost, but the Ghost refuses to accept money as a deal for his help, wisely stating, "Only a fool accepts a gift without knowing what it's worth". During this conversation, Mitchell confirms his suspicion that they are talking with the Ghost.

Meanwhile, the Canadians' Afghan ally, Bashir Daoud Khan (BDK), and his son, Karim, are double-crossing them and are working with the Taliban. Sanders' section sees this firsthand while observing the Ghost visit his son's home and granddaughters. The home was situated on land owned by BDK, while the crops had been destroyed by a Coalition airstrike some time in the past, leaving the Ghost's son with nothing to give BDK as his tithe for protection.

Soon after the Ghost leaves, BDK arrives with Taliban protection and instructs the Ghost's son to pay up his money. When the son doesn't give the money owed, BDK kidnaps the Ghost's granddaughters. Sanders' fireteam observes the whole scene, but Mitchell repeatedly instructs them to hold their fire as they do not fully understand local politics. While everyone in the Canadian intelligence group knows their Afghan allies are crooked, there is no alternative in the province, and they need all the help they can get.

Meanwhile, Bowman reveals to Sanders that she is pregnant with his child, conceived while both were on leave in Cyprus. Sanders rejoices in this, despite its being a serious problem given military regulations prohibiting fraternization. Before leaving for his next mission, Sanders proposes to Bowman and she happily accepts.

The Canadians follow the Ghost, who has declared a personal war against BDK in revenge for the kidnapping of the girls. With assistance from his tribe, the Ghost abducts BDK's son Karim and beheads him. Following this, the Ghost arranges a meeting with BDK in an isolated house, at the same time that BDK is supposed to be with the Canadians as they commemorate the opening of Hyena Road.

When BDK arrives with his bodyguards in a convoy, he demands to know the location of his son. The Ghost responds by opening a sack he has brought and holding up Karim's severed head, at which point BDK pulls out his pistol and threatens to kill the Ghost.

Sanders and his section, who have been observing the incident, shoot and kill BDK as they see his positive intent of violence. They do not, however, know that the Ghost desired to die having nothing else to live for and only wanted to avenge his grandchildren who he assumed were lost forever.

As the section pulls out, dozens of Taliban insurgents arrive, and the section is trapped with the Ghost around the house. Although they fight off the insurgents, there is no support available, and the Canadians are pinned down. After Travis, a member of Sanders' section, is shot in the head by a sniper, the section decides to relocate into the house under heavy enemy fire.

As they move, they run into an IED, incapacitating the section, and only Sanders and the Ghost survive. Recognizing there is no escape, Sanders calls for an artillery strike on his location to eliminate the insurgents. After apologizing for the last time to Bowman, who desperately tries to countermand the order, Sanders tells the Ghost that he was going to be a father, something the Ghost appears to understand despite his not speaking English. Moments later, the artillery rounds hit the house obliterating Sanders, the Ghost, and many of the Taliban insurgents around them.

Later, Canadian troops rescue numerous Afghan children, including the Ghost's granddaughters, having acted on the Cleaner's information and other assets. The film ends with the ramp ceremony for Sanders and his section as Mitchell talks about how things will eventually get better, in the long term.

== Cast ==
- Paul Gross as Captain Pete Mitchell
- Rossif Sutherland as Warrant Officer Ryan Sanders
- Clark Johnson as Brigadier General Rilman
- Allan Hawco as Master Corporal Travis Davidson
- Christine Horne as Captain Jennifer Bowman
- David Richmond-Peck as Hickie
- Jennifer Pudavick as Mary
- Aqqalu Meekis as Wolf
- Neamat Arghandabi as the Ghost
- Nabil Elouahabi as The Cleaner

== Production ==
The making of the film was documented in the unconventional experimental short Bring Me the Head of Tim Horton by Guy Maddin, Evan Johnson, and Galen Johnson.

== Reception ==
Hyena Road received average reviews from critics, scoring 57% on Rotten Tomatoes, based on 23 reviews. Metacritic, which uses a weighted average, assigned the film a score of 44 out of 100, based on 9 critics, indicating "mixed or average" reviews. In Canada, Kate Taylor gave the film three stars in The Globe and Mail, complimenting director Paul Gross for combining gripping war depictions with realistic performances. Peter Howell of The Toronto Star awarded it three stars, judging it to have "a questioning tone" and a realistic portrayal of the Canadian Forces.

In the United States, Daniel M. Gold of The New York Times found the film lacked emotional involvement but carried a message about why Afghanistan is known as a "graveyard of empires." In Variety, Geoff Berkshire dismissed it as "hardly The Bridge on the River Kwai."

Concurrently with the release of Hyena Road, filmmakers Guy Maddin, Evan Johnson, and Galen Johnson released Bring Me the Head of Tim Horton, an experimental short film nominally billed as a "behind the scenes" look at the making of Hyena Road.

=== Accolades ===
Award	Date of ceremony	Category	Recipient(s)	Result	Ref(s)
ACTRA Awards	20 February 2016	Outstanding Performance - Male	Rossif Sutherland	Nominated	
ACTRA Awards	20 February 2016	Outstanding Performance - Female	Christine Horne	Nominated	
Canadian Screen Awards	13 March 2016	Best Art Direction / Production Design	Arv Greywal, Steve Shewchuk and Larry Spittle	Nominated	
Canadian Screen Awards	13 March 2016	Best Cinematography	Karim Hussain	Nominated	
Canadian Screen Awards	13 March 2016	Best Editing	David Wharnsby	Nominated	
Canadian Screen Awards	13 March 2016	Best Overall Sound	Lou Solakofski, Ian Rankin, Joe Morrow, Russ Dyck, Graham Rogers, James Bastable, André Azoubel, Don White and Jack Hereen	Won	
Canadian Screen Awards	13 March 2016	Best Sound Editing	Jane Tattersall, David McCallum, Martin Gwynn Jones, Barry Gilmore, David Evans, David Rose, Brennan Mercer, Ed Douglas, Kevin Banks, Goro Koyama and Andy Malcolm	Won	
Canadian Screen Awards	13 March 2016	Best Costume Design	Katelynd Johnston	Nominated	
Canadian Screen Awards	13 March 2016	Best Make-up	Jayne Dancose, Debra Johnson and Charles Porlier	Nominated	
Canadian Screen Awards	13 March 2016	Best Visual Effects	Phil Jones, Sarah Wormsbecher, Eric Doiron, Anthony DeChellis, Lon Molnar, Geoff D.E. Scott, Nathan Larouche and Mark Fordham	Won	
Directors Guild of Canada	22 October 2016	Best Director of a Feature Film	Paul Gross	Won	
Directors Guild of Canada	22 October 2016	Best Production Design	Arvinder Grewal	Nominated	
Directors Guild of Canada	22 October 2016	Best Editing	David Wharnsby	Nominated	
Directors Guild of Canada	22 October 2016	Best Sound Editing	Jane Tattersall, Kevin Banks, Ed Douglas, David Evans, Barry Gilmore, Martin Gwynn Jones, Dave Rose, David McCallum, Brennan Mercer, Claire Dobson, Krystin Hunter	Nominated	
