= Quest for Fire (film) =

1981 adventure film by Jean-Jacques Annaud

- Theatrical release poster by Carl Ramsey
- Directed by: Jean-Jacques Annaud
- Screenplay by: Gérard Brach
- Based on: The Quest for Fire by J.-H. Rosny
- Produced by: Denis Héroux; John Kemeny
- Starring: Everett McGill; Rae Dawn Chong; Ron Perlman; Nameer El-Kadi
- Cinematography: Claude Agostini
- Edited by: Yves Langlois
- Music by: Philippe Sarde
- Production companies: International Cinema Corporation; Ciné Trail; Belstar Productions; Stéphan Films; Gruskoff Film; Famous Players Ltd.
- Distributed by: AMLF (France); 20th Century-Fox (Canada and United States)
- Release date: 16 December 1981
- Running time: 100 minutes
- Countries: Canada; France
- Language: Invented language
- Budget: $12 million
- Box office: $21 million domestic $55 million total global

Quest for Fire (French: La Guerre du feu) is a 1981 science fantasy adventure film set in the Paleolithic era, directed by Jean-Jacques Annaud, written by Gérard Brach and starring Everett McGill, Ron Perlman, Nameer El-Kadi and Rae Dawn Chong. The Canadian-French co-production is a film adaptation of the 1911 Belgian novel The Quest for Fire by J.-H. Rosny. The story is set "80,000 years ago", with a plot concerning the struggle for control of fire by early humans and their encounters with different hominid species.

The film was critically acclaimed. It won the Academy Award and BAFTA Award for Best Makeup, and the César Awards for Best Film and Best Director. At the 4th Genie Awards, the film was nominated in seven categories and won in five (Best Actress, Best Costume Design, Best Editing, Best Sound Editing, Best Overall Sound).

== Plot ==
The Ulam are a tribe of cavemen who carefully guard a small flame, which they use to start larger fires for cooking and protection. After being forced out of their cave during a raid by the ape-like Wagabu, the Ulam become despondent for their future when the seed flame is accidentally extinguished while seeking refuge in a marsh. Since the tribe does not know how to create fire themselves, the tribal elder decides to send three men, Naoh, Amoukar, and Gaw, on a quest to find fire.

During their journey, the trio encounters several dangers, including the Kzamm, a tribe of more primitive-looking cannibals who have a roaring cooking fire. Gaw and Amoukar lure most of the Kzamm away from their encampment, while Naoh kills the remaining warriors, though not before being bitten on the genitals, causing him agony. The trio discovers a man and women, their bodies painted with ash, bound to a tree by the Kzamm. They free the captives, but one succumbs to his injuries. The lone survivor, a woman named Ika, begins to follow the men. The three Ulam take a burning stick and prepare to return home. Ika makes a plant-based poultice to help Naoh recover from his genital injury. Later that night, the group makes a large bonfire, unaware that a Kzamm has spotted it from a distance. In the morning, the group wakes up to an ambush by a large group of Kzamm. Just as the Kzamm are about to attack, they suddenly back down as a herd of woolly mammoth appear. Naoh approaches the herd, offering a tuft of grass to the patriarch. The mammoth accepts the offering and allows Naoh and his companions to approach the herd. The herd then stampede towards the cowering Kzamm, driving them away. Later that night, Amoukar attempts to mount Ika, but she hides near Naoh, who then asserts his claim by raping her in front of the other two males.

Ika realizes they are passing near her home village and tries to persuade the Ulam to go back with her. When they refuse, it appears that Ika and the Ulam will be going their separate ways, until Naoh, looking depressed, turns around— followed by the somewhat more reluctant Gaw and Amoukar— and the group reunites. After Naoh leaves the others to scout a village, he becomes trapped in quicksand, nearly sinking to his death. He is discovered and captured by the Ivaka, Ika's tribe. In the village, Naoh is physically inspected by the chief and deemed a good specimen, after which he is made to understand that he is required to mate with certain fat women of the tribe. The petite Ika is excluded, and when she attempts to lie near him later that night, she is chased away. The Ivaka demonstrate for Naoh their advanced knowledge of fire-making with a hand drill, causing him to weep with joy.

Gaw and Amoukar eventually find Naoh among the Ivaka and make a rescue attempt, but Naoh appears unwilling to leave. At night, they knock Naoh unconscious and with Ika's guidance escape the camp. The next day, Naoh washes off the Ivaka body paint he had been wearing. He tries to mount Ika again, but she teaches him the more intimate missionary position. Not long before they reach the marsh where they started the journey, the three are ambushed by rivals from within the Ulam, who want to steal the fire and claim the prize themselves. However, Naoh and his group defeat them using the Ivakan atlatls, which are superior to Ulam weapons.

Upon rejoining the Ulam, the group presents the fire to the delight of all. But during the ensuing celebration, the fire is accidentally extinguished again when the firekeeper falls into the marsh. Naoh attempts to create a new fire as he had seen in the Ivaka camp, but after several failed attempts, Ika takes over. Once the spark is lit, the tribe rejoices.

Months later, Naoh and Ika prepare to have an interspecies child.

== Cast ==
- Everett McGill as Naoh, a caveman sent on a quest to obtain fire
- Ron Perlman as Amoukar, a caveman who becomes Naoh's travel companion
- Nameer El-Kadi as Gaw, a caveman who becomes Naoh's travel companion
- Rae Dawn Chong as Ika, a naked woman in gray and black body paint who is a member of the Ivaka tribe
- Gary Schwartz as Rouka
- Naseer El-Kadi as Nam
- Franck-Olivier Bonnet as Aghu
- Jean-Michel Kindt as Lakar
- Kurt Schiegl as Faum
- Brian Gill as Modoc
- Terry Fitt as Hourk
- Bibi Caspari as Gammla
- Peter Elliott as Mikr
- Michelle Leduc as Matr
- Robert Lavoie as Tsor
- Matt Birman as Morah
- Joy Boushel as Sura
- Christian Benard as Umbre
- Tarlok Sing Seva as Tavawa
- Lolamal Kapisisi as Firemaker
- George Buza, Antonio Barichievich, Adrian Street and Luke McMasters as Kzamm tribesmen

== Production ==
=== Writing and characterization ===
Special language forms were created by novelist Anthony Burgess, while patterns of movement and gesture were developed by anthropologist Desmond Morris. The more advanced language of the Ivaka was largely based on the languages of the Cree and Inuit native peoples of northern Canada, which caused some amusement among those in these communities who saw the film, since the words have little to do with the plot. The Ulam are portrayed as stereotypical, Neanderthal-style cavemen, in an intermediate stage of development compared to the ape-like Wagabu, on one hand, and the culturally more advanced Ivaka on the other. The Ulam and Ivaka are depicted as light pigmented, the Kzamm as red-haired. The Ivaka are depicted as using body ornamentation (jewelry, body paint, masks, headgear), fully developed language and simple technology such as gourds as vessels and the atlatl.

=== Filming ===
The movie was filmed on location in the Scottish Highlands, and in Kenya at Tsavo National Park and Lake Magadi. The opening sequence was filmed at Cathedral Grove on Vancouver Island, British Columbia, Canada for the forest scenes, whereas the cave home was filmed at Greig's Caves on the Bruce Peninsula along the Niagara Escarpment near Lion's Head, Ontario.

Some scenes involving mammoths were scheduled to be filmed in Iceland, but had to be canceled. Michael D. Moore, the associate producer in charge of action and animal scenes, was training circus elephants for six months to behave like mammoths. When it came time to film in Iceland, strict laws about transporting four-legged animals into the country delayed their arrival. Then a volcano erupted nearby the ranch where they would have been staying. Had they been there, the elephants would have been killed.

== Reception ==
=== Box office ===
The film sold almost five million tickets in France.

=== Critical response ===
Quest for Fire holds a score of 88% on review aggregator Rotten Tomatoes based on 25 reviews for an average rating of 7.4/10. The website's critics consensus states, "Its characters can't do much more than grunt, but that doesn't keep Quest for Fire from offering a deeply resonant— and surprisingly funny— look at the beginning of the human race." On Metacritic, the film holds a weighted average score of 79 out of 100, based on 11 reviews, indicating "generally favorable reviews".

Roger Ebert gave the film three and a half stars out of four, writing that he saw it as a "borderline comedy" in the opening scenes, but "then these characters and their quest began to grow on me, and by the time the movie was over I cared very much about how their lives would turn out." Gene Siskel of the Chicago Tribune awarded three stars out of four, stating that "you may be tempted, as I was, to shout wisecracks at the screen. But then the basic appeal of the story begins to work, and every so often we find ourselves asking ourselves, 'I wonder if that's the way it did happen?' And when that happens, 'Quest for Fire' has you hooked." Janet Maslin of The New York Times wrote that the film was "more than just a hugely entertaining science lesson, although it certainly is that. It's also a touching, funny and suspenseful drama about prehumans." Sheila Benson of the Los Angeles Times wrote that she did not know how historically accurate the movie was, "But this is film making, not carbon dating, and it seems that every piece of magic and the skill of every craft has been used to free our imagination, to let it soar with the film to see what life may have been like 80,000 years ago." Pauline Kael of The New Yorker wrote, "It's almost impossible to guess what the tone of this ape-man love story (based on a French novel, by J. H. Rosny, Sr.) is intended to be. Are we meant to laugh at the gaminess? At the men's werewolf foreheads? (Thick hair sprouts about an inch above their eyebrows.) The director, Jean-Jacques Annaud, seems to be willing for us to laugh but not sure about how to tell us when."

С. J. Henderson reviewed Quest for Fire for Pegasus magazine and stated that "Quest for Fire is, possibly, the best science-fact film ever made. Although it may draw considerable flack from blind and fearful organizations such as the Moral Majority or the Catholic Church, it should be able to weather any attack. Simplistic and yet brilliant, it is the most optimistic film released so far in the '80s. Considering the way things are, it wasn't a bad decade during which to release it."

=== Academic response ===
The film was not intended to be a documentary of a specific point in pre-history. Academic critics panned the film's accuracy, with the most common criticism being that so many important discoveries were made in a short period of time by a few actors. Director Annaud countered that the film "doesn't try to be true, only plausible. It is a symbolic approach to man's development. In a few days these people make progress that really might have taken several generations." Academics noted that control of fire may have occurred as long as 500,000 years ago, long preceding the film's 80,000 year BP setting. Annaud countered that control of fire was probably discovered and lost many times over the course of deep time. Anthropologist Helen E. Fisher notes that human species have been having face to face sex (missionary position) as far back as four million years ago. Anthropoligist Gloria Levitas took exception to the film's overt depiction of violence between groups, "People were violent then, but it is incorrect to give the impression of utter mayhem between tribes of people. They were as likely to engage in avoidance as [dangerous] confrontation." In an essay for the journal American Anthropologist, Brown University linguistics professor Philip Lieberman described as "absurd" the mixture of different levels of advancement among different tribes living in close proximity. Lieberman pointed out that it "would be most unlikely 80,000 years ago" for humans to still be exhibiting apelike characteristics; at the same time, he noted that the Ivaka tribe was depicted as having "a village culture that would have been likely 10,000 years ago."

== Accolades ==
The film was nominated for six César Awards in 1981, including Best Screenplay, Dialogue or Adaptation for Gérard Brach, Best Music Written for a Movie for Philippe Sarde, Best Cinematography for Claude Agostini, and Best Sets for Brian Morris, winning those for Best Film and Best Director. In 1983 it won the Academy Award for Best Makeup. Also in 1983, it won in five categories in the Genie Awards.

| Award | Category | Name | Outcome |
|---|---|---|---|
| 55th Academy Awards | Best Makeup | Sarah Monzani; Michèle Burke | Won |
| 36th British Academy Film Awards | Best Make Up Artist | Sarah Monzani; Christopher Tucker; Michèle Burke | Won |
| 40th Golden Globe Awards | Best Foreign Film | —N/a | Nominated |
| 7th César Awards | Best Film | Jean-Jacques Annaud | Won |
| 7th César Awards | Best Director | Jean-Jacques Annaud | Won |
| 7th César Awards | Best Screenplay, Dialogue or Adaptation | Gérard Brach | Nominated |
| 7th César Awards | Best Music Written for a Film | Philippe Sarde | Nominated |
| 7th César Awards | Best Cinematography | Claude Agostini | Nominated |
| 7th César Awards | Best Production Design | Brian Morris | Nominated |
| 4th Genie Awards | Best Motion Picture | Denis Héroux; John Kemeny | Nominated |
| 4th Genie Awards | Best Performance by an Actress in a Leading Role | Rae Dawn Chong | Won |
| 4th Genie Awards | Best Performance by a Foreign Actor | Ron Perlman | Nominated |
| 4th Genie Awards | Best Achievement in Film Editing | Yves Langlois | Won |
| 4th Genie Awards | Best Achievement in Sound Editing | Martin Ashbee; Kenneth Heeley-Ray; Kevin Ward; David Evans | Won |
| 4th Genie Awards | Best Achievement in Overall Sound | Don White; Kenneth Heeley-Ray; Joe Grimaldi; Claude Hazanavicius; Austin Grimaldi | Won |
| 4th Genie Awards | Best Achievement in Costume Design | John Hay | Won |
| 9th Saturn Awards | Best International Film | —N/a | Won |
| 9th Saturn Awards | Outstanding Film Award | —N/a | Won |

== Legacy ==
After the surprise box office hit of Quest for Fire, several film productions followed to mimic its documentary style approach to prehistory. These included some Italian B-movies that tried to capitalize on the barbarian/prehistoric trend like Lucio Fulci's Conquest (1983) and Umberto Lenzi's Ironmaster (1983), though these films had a strong fantasy orientation. Iceman (1984) focused on scientific realism though set in the modern era. The Clan of the Cave Bear (1986) replicated the documentary tone and focus on inter-species interactions, in this case Neanderthal and Cro-Magnon. Ao: The Last Hunter (2010) is a French film focusing on the last Neanderthal. Alpha (2018) is a survival journey in the Paleolithic era concerning the domestication of the dog which uses a similar invented language approach.

== See also ==
- The Clan of the Cave Bear
- Dance of the Tiger
- The Inheritors (Golding novel)
- Interbreeding between archaic and modern humans, which is depicted in this film
- List of historical period drama films and series
- Shaman (novel)
- Survival film, about the film genre, with a list of related films

== Works cited ==
- Marshall, Bill (2001). Quebec National Cinema. McGill–Queen's University Press. ISBN 0-7735-2103-8.
