= Thamela Mpumlwana =

Canadian actor

Thamela Mpumlwana is a Canadian actor of South African heritage. He is most noted for his performance as Sheppard in the 2020 film Akilla's Escape, for which he received a Canadian Screen Award nomination for Best Supporting Actor at the 9th Canadian Screen Awards.

He previously voiced the role of Ramone in the first season of Peg + Cat, and played Tyson Parker in the first season of In the Dark. In 2023 he played the leading role in the drama thriller film The Wall Street Boy (Kipkemboi). In 2025 he played Pearson (#8) in The Long Walk.
