= Nicholas Kadi =

Iraqi-American actor (born 1952)

- Born: Nameer El-Kadi; September 22, 1952 (age 73); Istanbul, Turkey

Nicholas Kadi (born Nameer El-Kadi; September 22, 1952) is an Iraqi–American actor.

== Early life, family and education ==
Kadi was born in Istanbul, Turkey. with a twin brother, Naseer El-Kadi. Their father, Nizar el Kadi, was an Iraqi ambassador.

== Career ==
Kadi co-starred in the Academy Award-winning movie Quest for Fire (1981).

He has appeared in numerous television series, such as JAG, Sleeper Cell, Alias, 24, ER, The Young and the Restless, including the sitcom The Wayans Bros.

== Personal life ==
Kadi is fluent in Arabic and French.

According to the commentary by Rae Dawn Chong and Ron Perlman on the La Guerre du Feu DVD, Kadi met his wife on the set of the film. She was an on-set nurse in Scotland. Perlman is the godfather to their daughter.

== Filmography ==
- La Guerre du Feu (Quest for Fire) (1981)
- Navy SEALS (1990)
- Me, Myself and I (1992)
- Congo (1995)
- George of the Jungle (1997)
- Ballad of the Nightingale (1998)
- Freedom Strike (1998)
- Muhammad: The Last Prophet (2002)
- Cold Winter (2005)
- Soldier of God (2005)
- Clear Cut, Simple (2007)
- Oranges (2008)
- Glee (appearance) (2014)
