= Kenneth Heeley-Ray =

British-Canadian film sound editor

Kenneth Heeley-Ray (October 26, 1916 - January 19, 2006) was a British-Canadian film sound editor, most noted as a Canadian Film Award and Genie Award winner for Best Overall Sound and Best Sound Editing.

Born and raised in Macclesfield, Cheshire, he began his career in British film before moving to Canada in 1952 to work for the National Film Board of Canada; initially a short-term contract, he remained with the agency for 12 years before beginning to work for commercial film studios in the 1960s. He was also an occasional producer, winning a CFA in 1966 as coproducer with his wife Ann of the short educational film The Scribe.

After his retirement from the film industry in the early 1990s, his colleagues began to organize a campaign to have the Genie Awards honour him with a lifetime achievement award. Their efforts quickly garnered enthusiastic support from Canadian and international industry figures including Oliver Stone, Jean-Jacques Annaud, Daniel Petrie, Christopher Chapman, Bob Clark, Harold Greenberg and Garth Drabinsky, all of whom wrote letters of tribute praising Heeley-Ray's dedication, professionalism and willingness to mentor younger colleagues entering the industry, to the point that even Genie publicist Maria Topalovich was moved to tears reading them. He received the lifetime achievement award at the 14th Genie Awards in 1993.

He died in 2006 on Saltspring Island, British Columbia.

== Awards ==
Award	Year	Category	Work	Result	Ref(s)
Canadian Film Awards	1966	Best Training and Instruction Film	The Scribe with Ann Heeley-Ray, John Sebert	Won	
Canadian Film Awards	1968	Best Sound Editing, Non-Feature	A Place to Stand	Won	
Canadian Film Awards	1975	Best Sound Editing	Black Christmas	Won	
Genie Awards	1980	Best Sound Editing	Agency	Nominated	
Genie Awards	1980	Best Sound Editing	Murder by Decree	Nominated	
Genie Awards	1981	Best Sound Editing	Tribute with Wayne Griffin, Patrick Drummond	Nominated	
Genie Awards	1983	Best Sound Editing	Quest for Fire with Martin Ashbee,Kevin Ward, David Evans	Won	
Genie Awards	1983	Best Overall Sound	Quest for Fire with Claude Hazanavicius, Austin Grimaldi, Don White, Joe Grimaldi	Won	
Genie Awards	1984	Best Sound Editing	A Christmas Story with David Evans, Steven Cole, Wayne Griffin	Nominated	
Genie Awards	1984	Best Overall Sound	A Christmas Story with Dino Pigat, David Appleby	Nominated	
Genie Awards	1989	Best Sound Editing	Iron Eagle II with David Evans, Richard Cadger, Robin Leigh, Drew King	Nominated	
Genie Awards	1993	Lifetime Achievement		Won	
