= Kendra Terpenning =

Canadian costume designer

Kendra Terpenning is a Canadian costume designer in film and television, who won the Canadian Screen Award for Best Costume Design at the 10th Canadian Screen Awards in 2022 for her work on the film Night Raiders.

She was a CAFTCAD Award nominee in 2021 for her work on the film Goalie.
