= Falling Angels (film) =

- Film Poster
- Directed by: Scott Smith
- Screenplay by: Esta Spalding
- Based on: Falling Angels by Barbara Gowdy
- Produced by: Robin Cass
- Starring: Callum Keith Rennie; Miranda Richardson; Katharine Isabelle; Kristin Adams; Monté Gagné
- Cinematography: Gregory Middleton
- Edited by: Reginald Harkema
- Music by: Ken Whiteley
- Production companies: Minds Eye Pictures; Triptych Media Inc. Wild Bunch
- Distributed by: Film Movement (United States)
- Release dates: September 8, 2003 (Toronto Film Festival); April 15, 2005 (United States)
- Running time: 109 minutes
- Country: Canada
- Language: English
- Budget: $4.3 million

Falling Angels is a 2003 independent film by Scott Smith, based on the novel of the same name by Barbara Gowdy and adapted for the screen by poet and author Esta Spalding. It is the second feature film by Scott Smith, writer, producer and director of Rollercoaster (1999). Set in the late 1960s, the film is a dark comedy focusing on the coming of age of three sisters and their struggle for independence in a dysfunctional family. It is also a story about the destructive effects of secrecy between parents and children.

== Plot ==
The first few days of 1970, in an Ontario suburb, and the Field family's fragile domestic peace has come to an end with the death of mother Mary. The story is told in loops and flashbacks over 10 years, opening and closing with the water flowing over Niagara Falls, while the bulk of the film depicts the fall and winter of 1969 leading to Mary's funeral. In the background looms the tragedy of the suspicious death years ago of the first-born child, three-month-old Jimmy; a pervasive and never spoken of subject, Jimmy's existence is only revealed through a single newspaper clipping the (then adolescent) girls find in Mary's purse.

The household is ruled by father Jim Field, modeled on his experiences in the military, as is illustrated by a flashback sequence to the two weeks he forced his family to spend trapped in his self-built backyard bomb shelter, for "practice". Jim works as a used-car salesman and he is keen on keeping up appearances in front of the neighbors. He is psychologically unstable, drinks heavily and cheats on his wife (which she accepts) although he is also oddly protective of her, insisting that his daughters watch her all the time. His depressed wife Mary, a onetime dancer, has escaped into apathy and alcoholism a long time ago. She lives a catatonic life on the living room couch, staring absently at the television, her ever-present coffee cup full of whiskey impassively filled by one family member or another.

Each of the three teenaged daughters has her own way to cope with the deleterious family atmosphere. They try to find their own experiences while struggling with weight of their family duties and concern for their mother. Norma is the eldest daughter and the most responsible element of the family; quiet, subdued and selfless, she overburdens herself with domestic tasks and responsibilities, and patiently puts up with her father's antics. She is also the only one intent on keeping the memory of her brother and on uncovering the secret around his death (the news article suggests that Mary slipped and dropped Jimmy over the falls, though the police suspected it wasn't an accident). After unexpectedly becoming friends with a neighbour girl, she lets some pleasure into her dreary life. As the opposite of Norma, middle child Lou fights for her independence, standing up to her father and loving her mother but despising her weakness. She assuages her fantasies of rebellion, experimenting with boys and drugs. Not as involved as Norma in the housekeeping, nor as rebellious as Lou, sweet-looking Sandy devotes herself to becoming a perfect woman, with her own naive sense of femininity and sexuality. She engages in an affair with an older, married shoe salesman which ends up an awkward threesome scene with the man's twin brother, and Sandy learning that she is pregnant.

The story builds from one small event to another. Things climax during one long New Year's Eve night, as a dramatic event and the final admission of the secret definitively put an end to the Fields' "pretend normal" family life. The ending is left open, leaving the viewer to guess whether or not the characters will be able to start a new and more honest life and reconstruct family bonds.

== Cast ==
- Miranda Richardson as Mary Field, the mother
- Callum Keith Rennie as Jim Field, the father
- Katharine Isabelle as Lou Field, highschooler, middle daughter
- Monté Gagné as Norma Field, highschooler, oldest daughter
- Kristin Adams as Sandy Field, highschooler, youngest daughter
- Mark McKinney as Reg and Ron, 38-year-old twins
- Kett Turton as Tom, Lou's highschooler American crush
- Ingrid Nilson as Stella, Norma's highschooler friend
- Carman Fielding as Young Lou
- Melissa Brown as Young Norma
- Courtney Goodison as Young Sandy

== Production ==
=== Development ===
Falling Angels was in development for seven years. Since reading Barbara Gowdy's novel in 1991, producer Robin Cass meant to put it to film but the rights to a film adaptation were already tied up and it took five years to acquire them. Lynne Stopkewich was signed as writer/director in 1997 and produced a first draft but she desisted in 2000 to work on other films after the financial issues had delayed the project, recommending Scott Smith as director. Esta Spalding was hired for scriptwriting. Budget was eventually secured in October 2002.

=== Casting ===
Hiring two-time Golden Globe winner Miranda Richardson for the role of the mother was crucial to secure the involvement of production companies. More than 1,000 women were auditioned for the key roles of the sisters before settling on Katharine Isabelle, Kristin Adams and Monté Gagné. Callum Keith Rennie signed on to play the father in October 2002, one month before filming started.

=== Filming ===
While the story takes place in Ontario, Falling Angels was shot on location mostly in Saskatchewan. Principal filming lasted from 19 November 2002 to 17 December 2002, with the final scene shot at the edge of Niagara Falls in February 2003.

Falling Angels was the first feature film to utilize the Canada Saskatchewan Production Studios in Regina.

Director of photography Gregory Middleton reported that the short shooting schedule was challenging, as was the one-day shooting in Niagara Falls in winter weather and filming in Moose Jaw with the Canadian Forces Snowbirds practising overhead.

=== Design ===
Middleton took inspiration from Barbara Gowdy's family photos to re-create the atmosphere of the late 1960s while "combining realism with a slightly bent reality to emphasize certain psychological aspects of the story."

== Reception ==
On the review aggregator website Rotten Tomatoes, 63% of 8 critics' reviews are positive, with an average rating of 5.4/10.

== Awards ==
Falling Angels premiered at the 2003 Toronto International Film Festival where it was named one of "Canada's Top Ten Films this year" by the Toronto Film Festival Group. It won the award for Best Ontario Film at Cinéfest Sudbury 2003.

Director Scott Smith won the Nanaimo inFEST Short Film and Awards Festival Silvie Award (2003) and was nominated for Outstanding Achievement in Direction by the Directors Guild of Canada (2004) while production designer and art director Rob Gray was nominated for Outstanding Achievement in Production Design.

The film received two Genie Awards at the 24th Genie Awards in 2004: Best Art Direction/Production Design (Rob Gray and Christina Kuhnigk) and Best Original Song (Ken Whiteley for the song "Tell Me"), and was nominated four times: Best Cinematography (Gregory Middleton), Best Overall Sound (Warren St. Onge, Steph Carrier and Lou Solakofski), Best Sound Editing (David McCallum, Steven Hammond, Ronayne Higginson, David Rose and Jane Tattersall) and Best Adapted Screenplay (Esta Spalding).

Callum Keith Rennie was nominated at the 2004 Leo Award for Best Male Lead Performance in a Feature Length Drama and at the 2003 Vancouver Film Critics Circle Award for Best Actor in a Canadian Film.
