= Nelson Ferreira (sound editor) =

Canadian sound editor

- Occupation: sound editor
- Years active: 1990-present

Nelson Ferreira is a sound editor. He is known for his work on the films The Shape of Water for which he was nominated with Nathan Robitaille for Academy Award for Best Sound Editing at the 90th Academy Awards, and The Breadwinner, for which he won the Canadian Screen Award for Best Sound Editing at the 6th Canadian Screen Awards.
