= Paul Germann =

Canadian sound effects editor

- Occupations: Sound designer, Sound Editor
- Website: https://paulgermann.com/

Paul Germann is a Canadian sound effects editor, who was a winner of the Canadian Screen Award for Best Sound Editing at the 10th Canadian Screen Awards in 2022 for Scarborough, and at the 11th Canadian Screen Awards in 2023 for Brother.

He was nominated in the category on five prior occasions, receiving nods at the 16th Genie Awards in 1996 for The Michelle Apartments, the 30th Genie Awards in 2009 for Nurse.Fighter.Boy, the 8th Canadian Screen Awards in 2020 for both Disappearance at Clifton Hill and Goalie, and the 9th Canadian Screen Awards in 2021 for The Nest.
