= Goalie (film) =

2019 Canadian sports film

- Poster
- Directed by: Adriana Maggs
- Written by: Adriana Maggs; Jane Maggs
- Produced by: Daniel Iron
- Starring: Mark O'Brien; Kevin Pollak; Georgina Reilly
- Cinematography: Jason Tan
- Edited by: Simone Smith
- Distributed by: Mongrel Media
- Release date: March 1, 2019
- Running time: 111 minutes
- Country: Canada
- Language: English

Goalie is a 2019 Canadian biographical sports film about the hockey goaltender Terry Sawchuk. The film was directed and co-written by Adriana Maggs. Sawchuk is played by Mark O'Brien. The film was given a limited release on March 1, 2019.

The film does not use official NHL jerseys for legal reasons. This is also Sean McCann's final film before his death three months later in June 2019.

== Plot ==
The early life of Terry Sawchuk in Winnipeg, Manitoba is portrayed as lower middle class. He follows in his older brothers footsteps in becoming a pond hockey goalie. Meeting success, he is drafted by Trader Jack Adams to replace a winning but injured goalie for the Detroit Red Wings. In the age of maskless goalies, Terry is shown receiving pucks to his face, and helping to lead his team to victory.

Caught up in his intense and sometimes glamorous new world, Sawchuk marries a Detroit woman and they start a family. They move to Boston when he is traded to the Bruins. After he becomes alcoholic, abusive and a philanderer, they divorce.

As Sawchuk moves around the league, goaltenders begin wearing masks and teams hire more than one goalie per team. Sawchuk visits with his mentor Trader Jack, who recommends Sawchuk retire to enjoy life and teases him for having been gullible, as Jack had leveraged belonging for heroics.

Battered by a career on the ice, Sawchuk dies from an otherwise insignificant injury, sustained in a drunken argument. He was employed as a goalie by the New York Rangers at that time.

== Cast ==
- Mark O'Brien as Terry Sawchuk
- Kevin Pollak as Jack Adams
- Georgina Reilly as Pat (Morey/Sawchuk)
- Éric Bruneau as Marcel (Pronovost)
- Steve Byers as Gordie (Howe)
- Ted Atherton as Louis Sawchuk
- Janine Theriault as Anne Sawchuk
- Matt Gordon as Tommy Ivan
- Jonny Harris as Phil Sullivan
- Sean McCann as (70-year-old) Red Storey

The roles of married couple Terry and Pat are played by real life married couple O'Brien and Reilly.

== Cinematography ==
The cinematography by Jason Tan, "which has a fittingly vintage edge that does make one feel as though one is watching archival footage from the mid-twentieth century NHL" was commended. It is characterized by a sepia tone.

== Awards ==
Year	Award	Category	Recipient(s)	Result	Ref.
2020	8th Canadian Screen Awards	Best Actor	Mark O'Brien	Won	
2020	8th Canadian Screen Awards	Best Editing	Simone Smith	Nominated	
2020	8th Canadian Screen Awards	Best Overall Sound	David Ottier, Matt Chan, Graham Rogers	Nominated	
2020	8th Canadian Screen Awards	Best Sound Editing	Krystin Hunter, Brent Pickett, Paul Germann, Goro Koyama, Sandra Fox	Nominated	
2020	8th Canadian Screen Awards	Best Makeup	Randy Daudlin	Nominated	
2021	CAFTCAD Awards	Best Costume Design in Film, Period	Kendra Terpenning	Nominated	

== See also ==
- List of films about ice hockey
