= Yuri Gorbachow =

Canadian music and sound editor

- Occupations: Sound editor; music editor
- Television: Vikings; The Handmaid's Tale
- Awards: Canadian Screen Awards; Golden Reel Awards; Directors Guild of Canada Awards
- Website: Official website

Yuri Gorbachow is a sound and music editor whose television credits include Vikings and The Handmaid's Tale. He has shared Canadian Screen Awards, Golden Reel Awards and Directors Guild of Canada Awards for sound and music editing. He received two Primetime Emmy Award nominations for his work as a music editor on Vikings, in 2013 and 2016.

== Career ==
Gorbachow has worked in music editing since the early 1990s. In a 2023 interview, he described beginning his career as an assistant engineer at a recording studio, taking on music-editing work as the studio expanded into audio post-production, and becoming self-employed in 1992.

In 2004, Gorbachow received Golden Reel nominations for music editing on Hitler: The Rise of Evil and Queer as Folk.

In the 2023 interview, he described a collaboration with composer Trevor Morris that began in 2006 and included The Tudors, The Borgias, Vikings and Vikings: Valhalla. He also discussed working with Adam Taylor on The Handmaid's Tale. His work included preparing initial mixes of the composers' scores for review and handling revisions at the dubbing stage.

Gorbachow worked on the television adaptation of Halo. In a 2022 interview published by DGC Ontario, he described discussions with composer Sean Callery about combining new music for the series with themes from the games.

He received Primetime Emmy nominations for Outstanding Sound Editing for a Series for the Vikings episodes "Trial" in 2013 and "The Last Ship" in 2016. He was nominated for a Gemini Award for Best Sound in a Dramatic Series for The Tudors episode "410" in 2011.

Gorbachow shared Canadian Screen Awards for sound on The Borgias for "The Borgia Bull" in 2013 and "The Face of Death" in 2014.

His work on Vikings contributed to sound teams that received Canadian Screen Awards for "The Reckoning" in 2018, "Moments of Vision" in 2019, "What Happens in the Cave" in 2020, "The Best Laid Plans" in 2021 and "The Last Act" in 2022.

In 2019, Gorbachow and Lise Beauchesne won a Golden Reel Award for music editing on the Vikings episode "Moments of Vision", in a tie with American Horror Story: Apocalypse. The pair also won a Motion Picture Sound Editors Golden Reel Award for music editing on the Vikings episode "The Best Laid Plans" in 2021.

Gorbachow shared a Directors Guild of Canada Award for Best Sound Editing – Television Series for the Vikings episode "The Last Ship" in 2017. He was also part of the team that won Best Sound Editing – Dramatic Series for The Handmaid's Tale episode "Heroic" in 2020. He shared further awards in the latter category for the episodes "Safe" in 2023 and "Execution" in 2025.

== Awards and nominations ==
The following awards and nominations include honours shared with other members of the sound and music-editing teams.

Year	Award	Category	Work	Result	References
2025	Directors Guild of Canada Awards	Best Sound Editing – Dramatic Series	The Handmaid's Tale, “Execution”	Won	
2023	Directors Guild of Canada Awards	Best Sound Editing – Dramatic Series	The Handmaid's Tale, “Safe”	Won	
2022	Canadian Screen Awards	Best Sound, Fiction	Vikings, “The Last Act”	Won	
2021	Canadian Screen Awards	Best Sound, Fiction	Vikings, “The Best Laid Plans”	Won	
2021	Golden Reel Awards	Outstanding Achievement in Sound Editing – Episodic Short Form – Music	Vikings, “The Best Laid Plans”	Won	
2020	Canadian Screen Awards	Best Sound, Fiction	Vikings, “What Happens in the Cave”	Won	
2020	Directors Guild of Canada Awards	Best Sound Editing – Dramatic Series	The Handmaid's Tale, “Heroic”	Won	
2019	Canadian Screen Awards	Best Sound, Fiction	Vikings, “Moments of Vision”	Won	
2019	Golden Reel Awards	Outstanding Achievement in Sound Editing – Episodic Short Form – Music / Musical	Vikings, “Moments of Vision”	Won (tied)	
2018	Canadian Screen Awards	Best Sound, Fiction	Vikings, “The Reckoning”	Won	
2018	Golden Reel Awards	Outstanding Achievement in Sound Editing – Episodic Long Form – Music / Musical	Vikings, “The Departed”	Nominated	
2018	Golden Reel Awards	Outstanding Achievement in Sound Editing – Episodic Short Form – Music / Musical	The Handmaid's Tale, “Offred”	Nominated	
2017	Canadian Screen Awards	Best Sound in a Comedy or Dramatic Program or Series	Vikings, “The Last Ship”	Won	
2017	Directors Guild of Canada Awards	Best Sound Editing – Television Series	Vikings, “The Last Ship”	Won	
2016	Primetime Emmy Awards	Outstanding Sound Editing for a Series	Vikings, “The Last Ship”	Nominated	
2015	Canadian Screen Awards	Best Sound in a Dramatic Program or Series	Vikings, “The Choice”	Won	
2014	Canadian Screen Awards	Best Sound in a Dramatic Program or Series	The Borgias, “The Face of Death”	Won	
2013	Primetime Emmy Awards	Outstanding Sound Editing for a Series	Vikings, “Trial”	Nominated	
2013	Canadian Screen Awards	Best Sound in a Dramatic Program or Series	The Borgias, “The Borgia Bull”	Won	
2011	Gemini Awards	Best Sound in a Dramatic Series	The Tudors, “Episode 410”	Nominated	
