= Krystin Hunter =

Canadian sound editor

- Citizenship: Canada
- Education: Bachelor's degree Ryerson University
- Occupation: Sound editor
- Employer: Directors Guild of Canada
- Awards: Canadian Screen Award, 2021-2023

Krystin Hunter is a Canadian sound editor at the Directors Guild of Canada. She is a three-time winner of the Canadian Screen Award for Best Sound Editing, winning at the 9th Canadian Screen Awards in 2021 for Akilla's Escape, at the 10th Canadian Screen Awards in 2022 for Scarborough, and at the 11th Canadian Screen Awards in 2023 for Brother.

She was also a nominee in 2021 for Funny Boy, and was previously nominated at the 8th Canadian Screen Awards in 2020 for Goalie.

== Early life and education ==
Hunter graduated with a B.A. degree in Radio and Television Arts with a minor in English from Ryerson University.
