= Jane Tattersall =

Canadian sound editor

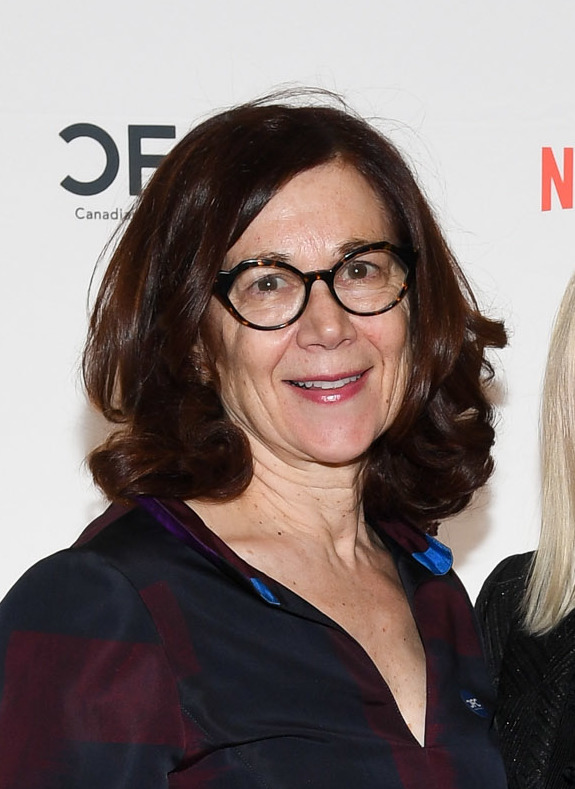
Jane Tattersall at the 2020 Canadian Film Centre Annual Gala & Auction

Jane Tattersall is a Canadian sound editor, most noted as a six-time Genie Award and Canadian Screen Award winner for Best Sound Editing.

Born in England, Tattersall moved with her family to Canada in childhood, and was educated at Queen's University. She worked as a researcher for TVOntario documentaries before apprenticing as a sound editor, and formed her own company, Tattersall Sound, in 1992. In 2000 the company merged with Casablanca Sound & Picture, a division of Alliance Atlantis, to form Tattersall Casablanca. She left her position as president of TC in 2003, returning to freelance sound editing work.

Her first Genie win was for Naked Lunch, a film for which she notably had to stick her hand into a jar of cockroaches to achieve the desired hissing sound.

== Awards ==
=== Genie Awards ===
Year	Award	Work	Result	Ref(s)
9th Genie Awards (1988)	Best Sound Editing	The Climb	Nominated	
10th Genie Awards (1989)	Best Sound Editing	Buying Time	Nominated	
13th Genie Awards (1992)	Best Sound Editing	Naked Lunch	Won	
13th Genie Awards (1992)	Best Sound Editing	South of Wawa	Nominated	
14th Genie Awards (1993)	Best Sound Editing	I Love a Man in Uniform	Nominated	
14th Genie Awards (1993)	Best Sound Editing	La Florida	Nominated	
17th Genie Awards (1996)	Best Sound Editing	The Kids in the Hall: Brain Candy	Nominated	
17th Genie Awards (1996)	Best Sound Editing	Lilies	Nominated	
20th Genie Awards (1999)	Best Sound Editing	Sunshine	Won	
21st Genie Awards (2000)	Best Sound Editing	Love Come Down	Won	
22nd Genie Awards (2002)	Best Sound Editing	Ginger Snaps	Nominated	
23rd Genie Awards (2003)	Best Sound Editing	Max	Won	
24th Genie Awards (2004)	Best Sound Editing	Falling Angels	Nominated	
27th Genie Awards (2007)	Best Sound Editing	Beowulf & Grendel	Nominated	
29th Genie Awards (2009)	Best Sound Editing	Passchendaele	Won	

=== Gemini Awards ===
Year	Award	Work	Result	Ref(s)
5th Gemini Awards (1990)	Best Sound in a Comedy, Variety or Performing Arts Program or Series	Carnival of Shadows	Won	
11th Gemini Awards (1996)	Best Sound in an Information Documentary Program or Series	Solidarity Song: The Hanns Eisler Story	Won	
12th Gemini Awards (1997)	Best Sound in a Comedy, Variety or Performing Arts Program or Series	A Tale of Tanglewood: Peter Grimes Reborn	Won	
13th Gemini Awards (1998)	Best Sound in a Dramatic Program	Straight Up: "Raw"	Nominated	
14th Gemini Awards (1999)	Best Sound Editing in a Dramatic Program or Series	Da Vinci's Inquest: "The Hunt"	Nominated	
15th Gemini Awards (2000)	Best Sound Editing in a Dramatic Program or Series	Restless Spirits	Won	
17th Gemini Awards (2002)	Best Sound in a Comedy, Variety or Performing Arts Program or Series	Ravel's Brain	Won	
18th Gemini Awards (2003)	Best Sound in a Comedy, Variety or Performing Arts Program or Series	Stormy Weather: The Music of Harold Arlen	Nominated	
20th Gemini Awards (2005)	Best Sound in a Comedy, Variety or Performing Arts Program or Series	Beethoven's Hair	Won	
20th Gemini Awards (2005)	Best Sound in a Dramatic Program	H_{2}O	Nominated	
20th Gemini Awards (2005)	Best Sound in a Dramatic Program	Sex Traffic	Nominated	
21st Gemini Awards (2006)	Best Sound in an Information/Documentary Program or Series	Five Days in September: The Rebirth of an Orchestra	Nominated	
22nd Gemini Awards (2007)	Best Sound in a Dramatic Program	Above and Beyond	Nominated	
24th Gemini Awards (2009)	Best Sound in a Dramatic Series	The Tudors	Won	
26th Gemini Awards (2011)	Best Sound in a Dramatic Series	The Tudors	Nominated	
26th Gemini Awards (2011)	Best Sound in a Dramatic Program	The Nativity	Nominated	

=== Canadian Screen Awards ===
Year	Award	Work	Result	Ref(s)
1st Canadian Screen Awards (2013)	Best Sound in a Dramatic Program or Series	The Borgias: "The Borgia Bull"	Won	
1st Canadian Screen Awards (2013)	Best Sound in a Dramatic Program or Series	Camelot: "Reckoning"	Nominated	
1st Canadian Screen Awards (2013)	Best Sound in a Comedy, Variety, or Performing Arts Program or Series	Michael: Tuesdays and Thursdays: "Bridges"	Nominated	
2nd Canadian Screen Awards (2014)	Best Sound in a Dramatic Program or Series	The Borgias: "The Face of Death"	Won	
2nd Canadian Screen Awards (2014)	Best Sound in a Dramatic Program or Series	World Without End: "King"	Nominated	
3rd Canadian Screen Awards (2014)	Best Sound in a Dramatic Program or Series	Vikings: "The Choice"	Won	
3rd Canadian Screen Awards (2014)	Best Sound in a Documentary, Factual or Lifestyle Program or Series	Our Man in Tehran	Won	
4th Canadian Screen Awards (2016)	Best Sound Editing	Hyena Road	Won	
4th Canadian Screen Awards (2016)	Best Sound in a Non-Fiction Program or Series	Songs of Freedom	Won	
4th Canadian Screen Awards (2016)	Best Sound in a Comedy or Dramatic Program or Series	Vikings	Nominated	
5th Canadian Screen Awards (2017)	Best Sound in a Comedy or Dramatic Program or Series	Vikings	Nominated	
6th Canadian Screen Awards (2018)	Best Sound in a Comedy or Dramatic Program or Series	Vikings	Won	
6th Canadian Screen Awards (2018)	Best Sound in a Comedy or Dramatic Program or Series	Cardinal	Nominated	
7th Canadian Screen Awards (2019)	Best Sound in a Dramatic Program or Series	Cardinal	Nominated	
8th Canadian Screen Awards (2020)	Best Sound, Fiction Program or Series	Vikings	Won	
8th Canadian Screen Awards (2020)	Best Sound, Fiction Program or Series	Cardinal	Nominated	
8th Canadian Screen Awards (2020)	Best Sound, Fiction Program or Series	Schitt's Creek: "Life Is a Cabaret"	Nominated	
8th Canadian Screen Awards (2020)	Best Sound, Non-Fiction Program or Series	The Nature of Things: "Remarkable Rabbits"	Won	
9th Canadian Screen Awards (2021)	Best Sound Editing	Funny Boy	Nominated	
9th Canadian Screen Awards (2021)	Best Sound, Fiction Program or Series	Vikings	Won	
10th Canadian Screen Awards (2022)	Best Sound Editing	All My Puny Sorrows	Nominated	
10th Canadian Screen Awards (2022)	Best Sound, Fiction Program or Series	The North Water	Nominated	
10th Canadian Screen Awards (2022)	Best Sound, Fiction Program or Series	Vikings	Won	
11th Canadian Screen Awards (2023)	Best Sound Editing	Brother	Won	

=== Primetime Emmy Awards ===
Year	Award	Work	Result	Ref(s)
65th Primetime Creative Arts Emmy Awards	Outstanding Sound Editing for a Limited or Anthology Series, Movie or Special	World Without End	Nominated	
65th Primetime Creative Arts Emmy Awards	Outstanding Sound Editing for a Comedy or Drama Series (One-Hour)	Vikings: "Trial"	Nominated	
68th Primetime Creative Arts Emmy Awards	Outstanding Sound Editing for a Comedy or Drama Series (One-Hour)	Vikings: "The Last Ship"	Nominated	
