= List of Canadian films of 1992 =

This is a list of Canadian films which were released in 1992:

Title	Director	Cast	Genre	Notes
Being at Home with Claude	Jean Beaudin	Roy Dupuis, Jacques Godin	Drama based on the play by René-Daniel Dubois	Genie Award – Musical Score
The Black Sheep (Le Mouton noir)	Jacques Godbout		National Film Board documentary	Aftermath of Meech Lake
Blue	Don McKellar	David Cronenberg, Tracy Wright, Brad Armstrong, Elizabeth Zorn	Short	
The Boys of St. Vincent	John N. Smith	Henry Czerny, Sebastian Spence, Philip Dinn, Brian Dooley, Greg Thomey	Docudrama produced by the National Film Board and CBC-TV	Banff Television Festival – Grand Prize
Breaking a Leg: Robert Lepage and the Echo Project	Donald Winkler	Robert Lepage	Documentary	
Buried on Sunday	Paul Donovan	Paul Gross, Maury Chaykin, Louis del Grande, Tommy Sexton	Comedy, drama	
Café Romeo	Rex Bromfield	Jonathan Crombie, Catherine Mary Stewart	Drama	
Careful	Guy Maddin	Kyle McCulloch, Gosia Dobrowolska	Drama film	Best Canadian Film at the 1992 Cinéfest
Colours of My Father: A Portrait of Sam Borenstein	Joyce Borenstein		National Film Board documentary	Genie Award – Short Documentary; Academy Award nomination – Short Documentary
The Date	Nikos Theodosakis	Scott Anderson, Michelle Bardeaux, Jay Brazeau, Babz Chula	Short comedy-drama	
The Fairy Who Didn't Want to Be a Fairy Anymore	Laurie Lynd	Daniel MacIvor, Holly Cole, Micah Barnes	Comedy-drama short	Genie Award winner for Best Live Action Short
Forbidden Love: The Unashamed Stories of Lesbian Lives	Lynne Fernie, Aerlyn Weissman		National Film Board Documentary	Genie Award for best feature documentary
Impolite	David Hauka	Christopher Plummer, Robert Wisden	Mystery	
A Kind of Family	Andrew Koster	Glen Murray	National Film Board documentary	
Léolo	Jean-Claude Lauzon	Maxime Collin, Ginette Reno, Pierre Bourgault, Germain Houde	Drama	Genie Award – Screenplay, Editing, Costumes; Canada-France co-production; entered into the Cannes; one of Time's 100 best films
Manufacturing Consent: Noam Chomsky and the Media	Peter Wintonick & Mark Achbar	Noam Chomsky	Documentary	The film profiles the ideas of M.I.T. professor Noam Chomsky; one of Canada's top-grossing documentaries.
The Measure of Your Passage (Le singe bleu)	Esther Valiquette		Documentary	
Momentum	Colin Low & Tony Ianzelo		National Film Board short	First film in IMAX HD
Moose Jaw: There's a Future in Our Past	Rick Hancox		Documentary	
No Problem	Craig Welch		Animated short	
North of Pittsburgh	Richard Martin	Viveca Lindfors, Jeff Schultz, Byron Lucas, Timothy Webber	Drama	
Phantom Life (La Vie fantôme)	Jacques Leduc			
Requiem for a Handsome Bastard (Requiem pour un beau sans-coeur)	Robert Morin	Gildor Roy, Jean-Guy Bouchard	Crime drama	
The Saracen Woman (La Sarrasine)	Paul Tana	Tony Nardi, Enrica Maria Modugno	Drama	Genie Award – Actor (Nardi)
Secret Nation	Michael Jones	Cathy Jones, Michael Wade, Rick Mercer, Ron Hynes, Andy Jones	Drama	Conspiracy drama about how and why the former British colony of Newfoundland became Canada's 10th province; Genie Award -Song
The Shower	Gail Harvey	Kate Lynch, Janet-Laine Green, Krista Bridges	Comedy-drama	
Speak It! From the Heart of Black Nova Scotia	Sylvia Hamilton		National Film Board documentary	Canada Award winner
The Steak (Le Steak)	Pierre Falardeau, Manon Leriche	Gaétan Hart	Documentary	
Stepping Razor: Red X	Nicholas Campbell	Peter Tosh	Documentary	
Tectonic Plates	Peter Mettler	Michael Benson, Normand Bissonnette, Robert Lepage, Marie Gignac		Based on a theatrical piece by Robert Lepage
Titanica	Stephen Low	Narrated by Leonard Nimoy	IMAX documentary	Feature-length documentary about a crew who descended to the depths of the North Atlantic in 1991 to film the Titanic's remains. Made with U.S. financing.
The Twist	Ron Mann	Archival footage includes Frankie Avalon, Little Richard, DeeDee Sharp and others involved with Dick Clark's American Bandstand.	Documentary	

== See also ==
- 1992 in Canada
- 1992 in Canadian television
