= 14th Genie Awards =

1993 Canadian film awards ceremony

- Date: December 12, 1993
- Site: Montreal
- Hosted by: Marc Labrèche

Highlights
- Best Picture: Thirty Two Short Films About Glenn Gould
- Most nominations: The Lotus Eaters

Television coverage
- Network: Radio-Canada; CBC Television

The 14th Genie Awards were held on December 12, 1993 to honour Canadian films released that year. This year's event was dominated by two Vancouver productions: Paul Shapiro's The Lotus Eaters, and Sandy Wilson's Harmony Cats.

In a bid to increase the visibility of the Genie Awards in the francophone market in Quebec, the ceremony was held in Montreal and conducted in French for the first time. It was hosted by Marc Labrèche, one of Quebec's most popular comedians. As it had in 1992, the academy produced a special that aired immediately after the main broadcast and presented viewers with film clips and winner and nominee interviews. This year, it included satellite hookups between the gala in Montreal, Toronto and Vancouver, and the languages had changed places: the main broadcast was in French, and the post-ceremony show, Genies Tonight Wrap Party, was in English.

Also new this year was the introduction of the Claude Jutra Award, which recognized outstanding achievement for a first-time director. This award is still presented at the contemporary Canadian Screen Awards as the John Dunning Best First Feature Award.

== Award winners and nominees ==
Best Motion Picture	Best Director
Thirty Two Short Films About Glenn Gould — Niv Fichman; La Florida — Pierre Sarrazin and Claude Bonin; Harmony Cats — Richard Davis and Alan Morinis; The Lotus Eaters — Sharon McGowan; The Sex of the Stars (Le Sexe des étoiles) — Pierre Gendron and Jean-Roch Marcotte	François Girard, Thirty Two Short Films About Glenn Gould; Paule Baillargeon, The Sex of the Stars (Le Sexe des étoiles); Atom Egoyan, Calendar; George Mihalka, La Florida; Sandy Wilson, Harmony Cats
Best Actor	Best Actress
Tom McCamus, I Love a Man in Uniform; Roy Dupuis, Cap Tourmente; Rémy Girard, La Florida; Gilbert Sicotte, Cap Tourmente; R. H. Thomson, The Lotus Eaters	Sheila McCarthy, The Lotus Eaters; Élise Guilbault, Cap Tourmente; Andrée Lachapelle, Cap Tourmente; Pauline Lapointe, La Florida; Aloka McLean, The Lotus Eaters
Best Supporting Actor	Best Supporting Actress
Kevin Tighe, I Love a Man in Uniform; Jim Byrnes, Harmony Cats; Yvan Canuel, La Florida; Tobie Pelletier, The Sex of the Stars (Le Sexe des étoiles); Christopher Plummer, Impolite	Nicola Cavendish, The Grocer's Wife; Brigitte Bako, I Love a Man in Uniform; Charlene Fernetz, Harmony Cats; Sylvie Drapeau, The Sex of the Stars (Le Sexe des étoiles); Kate Hennig, Thirty Two Short Films About Glenn Gould
Best Feature Length Documentary	Best Short Documentary
Forbidden Love: The Unashamed Stories of Lesbian Lives — Lynne Fernie, Aerlyn Weissman; A Childhood in Natashquan (Une enfance à Natashquan) — Yvon Provost; Stepping Razor: Red X — Edgar Egger, Nicholas Campbell; Titanica — Stephen Low; The Twist — Ron Mann	The Measure of Your Passage (Le Singe bleu) — Esther Valiquette; Breaking a Leg: Robert Lepage and the Echo Project — Donald Winkler
Best Live Action Short Drama	Best Animated Short
The Fairy Who Didn't Want to Be a Fairy Anymore — Laurie Lynd; The Date — Linda Theodosakis and Nikos Theodosakis; Hate Mail — Chris Kelly and Mark Sawers; Stereotypes (Stéréotypes) — Marcel Giroux and Jean-Marc Vallée; Your Country, My Country (Dans ton pays) — Marquise Lepage	Pearl's Diner — Lynn Smith; No Problem — Craig Welch
Best Art Direction/Production Design	Best Cinematography
Wolf Kroeger, Shadow of the Wolf; Mark S. Freeborn, Digger; David Roberts, The Lotus Eaters; Lynne Stopkewich, Harmony Cats; Curtis Wehrfritz, Tectonic Plates	Alain Dostie, Thirty Two Short Films About Glenn Gould; Thomas Burstyn, The Lotus Eaters; Philip Linzey, Harmony Cats; Barry Stone, Paris, France; Billy Williams, Shadow of the Wolf
Best Costume Design	Best Editing
Olga Dimitrov, Shadow of the Wolf; Dolly Ahluwalia and Aline Gilmore, The Burning Season; Sheila Bingham, The Lotus Eaters; Sharon Fedoruk, Harmony Cats; Christiane Tessler and Gaudeline Sauriol, The Sex of the Stars (Le Sexe des étoiles)	Gaétan Huot, Thirty Two Short Films About Glenn Gould; Roushell Goldstein, Paris, France; Debra Rurak, Harmony Cats; Susan Shipton, I Love a Man in Uniform; Susan Shipton, The Lotus Eaters
Best Overall Sound	Best Sound Editing
Hans Peter Strobl, Richard Besse and Jo Caron, The Sex of the Stars (Le Sexe des étoiles); Dean Giammarco, Paul A. Sharpe, Bill Sheppard and Daryl Powell, Harmony Cats; Jessica Casavant, Ao Loo, Bryan Day and Joe Grimaldi, I Love a Man in Uniform; David Appleby, Douglas Ganton, Dino Pigat and Lou Solakofski, La Florida; Dean Giammarco, Bill Sheppard, Paul A. Sharpe and Michael McGee, The Lotus Eaters	Anne Bakker, Gael MacLean, Alison Grace, Maureen Wetteland and Ellen Gram, The Lotus Eaters; Shane Shemko, Anke Bakker, Alison Grace and Cam Wagner, Harmony Cats; Andy Malcolm, Jane Tattersall, Dale Sheldrake, Penny Hozy and Sean Kelly, I Love a Man in Uniform; Marc Chiasson, Terry Burke, Jane Tattersall, Sean Kelly, Drew King, Tony Currie and Diane Boucher, La Florida; Jacques Plante, Viateur Paiement, Myriam Poirier, Jérôme Décarie and Antoine Morin, The Sex of the Stars (Le Sexe des étoiles)
Best Original Score	Best Screenplay
Simon Kendall, Cadillac Girls; Todd Boekelheide, Digger; Pierre Desrochers, Women in Love (Les Amoureuses); Mark Korven, The Grocer's Wife; Yves Laferrière, The Sex of the Stars (Le Sexe des étoiles)	Peggy Thompson, The Lotus Eaters; Suzette Couture, Pierre Sarrazin, La Florida; Atom Egoyan, Calendar; François Girard, Don McKellar, Thirty Two Short Films About Glenn Gould; David King, Harmony Cats
Special awards	
Claude Jutra Award: John Pozer, The Grocer's Wife; Golden Reel Award: La Florida; Outstanding Contributions to the Canadian Film Industry: André Link and John Dunning; Lifetime Achievement Award: Kenneth Heeley-Ray	
