= The Lotus Eaters (film) =

1993 Canadian film by Paul Shapiro

- Directed by: Paul Shapiro
- Written by: Peggy Thompson
- Starring: Sheila McCarthy; R. H. Thomson; Frances Hyland; Paul Soles; Frances Hyland; Michèle-Barbara Pelletier; Aloka McLean
- Cinematography: Thomas Burstyn
- Release date: 12 September 1993 (TIFF)
- Running time: 101 minutes
- Country: Canada
- Language: English

The Lotus Eaters is a 1993 Canadian drama film, written by Peggy Thompson and directed by Paul Shapiro. The film stars R. H. Thomson and Sheila McCarthy as Hal and Diana Kingswood, a married couple living on Galiano Island in British Columbia in the 1960s with their two daughters, Cleo (Tara Frederick) and Zoe (Aloka McLean).

== Plot ==
The story is told mostly through the eyes of Zoe, the younger Kingswood daughter. The Kingswoods seem to live a happy life, though teenage Cleo is frustrated with an inability to do things, like travel to Vancouver to see the Beatles. A catalyst for change for their somewhat stagnant lives arrives in the form of Anne-Marie, Zoe's new teacher at the school where Hal Kingswood is principal.

Anne-Marie arrives late on her first day of work with all of her belongings packed into her Volkswagen bus and takes up residence in a local cottage. The new teacher's progressive ideas shake up the little school, much to the irritation of Hal, the staid and stodgy principal.

Zoe and most of her class are immediately delighted with the lovely and vivacious young Anne-Marie, who teaches them through song and art. One evening, Anne-Marie invites Zoe over to her cottage. As Anne-Marie bathes in her wood-fired, outdoor bathtub, she gives Zoe a book of spells, which is ostensibly the mechanism through which change comes to the sleepy little island. Change is relatively mild at first - Cleo gets her first boyfriend, Dwayne Spittle, and Zoe learns how to make the wind gust.

Real change comes to Galiano Island when Hal discovers (thanks to Zoe) that his father hasn't been dead for decades, as previously presumed, and has only recently died (his ashes were shipped to Hal's mother). Hal's father abandoned Hal and his mother, Flora, when Hal was a child. Hal is rocked by the revelation of his father's abandonment, the fact that his father was alive, and his mother's lies. The combination of the shock of Hal's father's death and Hal's anger leads Flora to suffer a stroke.

Hal is in a tailspin. When he chances upon Anne-Marie crying in her bus, he takes a moment to learn more about her, discovering that she abandoned her fiancé at the altar and that her mother calls her every morning to remind her that she is a disappointment. As Anne-Marie talks of wanting to sail away to Mexico, Hal joins in and the two of them share a kiss, which scares both of them.

As fall sets in, Hal gets closer to Anne-Marie while Cleo gets closer to her new boyfriend, Dwayne. After Halloween, Zoe and her friend, Jo, see Hal's car parked in front of Anne-Marie's cottage and decide to take a closer peek. They discover the two lovers kissing passionately and quietly sneak away. Zoe attempts to curse her teacher with limited success. In the meantime, Cleo and Dwayne break the news to Cleo's parents that Cleo is pregnant and they are not getting married, leaving Hal and Diana reeling.

When Diana Kingswood discovers that Anne-Marie has no plans for Christmas, she immediately insists she have Christmas dinner with them. It's all too much for Zoe and she bolts from the dinner table. When Hal follows her up to her room, Zoe confronts him about his affair with Anne-Marie. Soon, everyone at the table knows. Diana kicks out Hal and burns his boat to the ground.

Unexpectedly, Hal's mother, Flora, passes away. Diana and Hal embrace at the funeral. Anne-Marie is confronted by her students about her affair with Hal and soon resigns. Anne-Marie leaves town and is replaced by a young male teacher.

== Cast ==
- Tara Frederick as Cleo Kingswood
- Aloka McLean as Zoe Kingswood
- R.H. Thomson as Hal Kingswood
- Sheila McCarthy as Diana Kingswood
- Andrea Libman as Jo Spittle
- Tony Dakota as Geoffrey
- Frances Hyland as Flora Kingswood
- Gabe Khouth as Dwayne Spittle
- Michéle-Barbara Pelletier as Anne-Marie Andrews

== Production ==
The film received $350,000 from BC Film. The film was slated to be directed by Sandy Wilson, but Shapiro stepped in after Wilson dropped the project in favour of Harmony Cats. It was the only theatrical feature film released by Shapiro, who is primarily known as a television director.

== Awards and nominations ==
The film garnered 11 Genie Award nominations at the 14th Genie Awards. It won three:

- Best Picture
- Best Actor (R.H. Thomson)
- Best Actress (Sheila McCarthy)
- Best Actress (Aloka McLean)
- Best Art Direction/Production Design (David Roberts)
- Best Cinematography (Thomas Burstyn)
- Best Costume Design (Sheila Bingham)
- Best Editing (Susan Shipton)
- Best Screenplay (Thompson)
- Best Sound (Dean Giammarco, Bill Sheppard, Paul A. Sharpe and Michael McGee)
- Best Sound Editing (Anne Bakker, Gael MacLean, Alison Grace, Maureen Wetteland and Ellen Gram)

== Availability ==
As of 2018, the film is streaming online for free on Canada Media Fund's Encore+ YouTube channel.

== Works cited ==
- Gasher, Mike (2002). Hollywood North: The Feature Film Industry in British Columbia. University of British Columbia Press.
