= 1992 Toronto International Film Festival =

Annual Canadian film festival

- Festival poster
- Opening film: Léolo
- Closing film: The Twist
- Location: Toronto, Ontario, Canada
- Hosted by: Toronto International Film Festival Group
- Festival date: September 10, 1992–September 19, 1992
- Language: English
- Website: tiff.net
- 1993 1991

The 17th Toronto International Film Festival (TIFF) took place in Toronto, Ontario, Canada between September 10 and September 19, 1992. Léolo was selected as the opening film.

Quentin Tarantino's debut film Reservoir Dogs premiered at the festival and won FIPRESCI International Critics' Award.

== Awards ==
Award	Film	Director
People's Choice Award	Strictly Ballroom	Baz Luhrmann
Metro Media Award	Man Bites Dog	Benoît Poelvoorde, Rémy Belvaux & André Bonzel
Best Canadian Feature Film	Requiem for a Handsome Bastard (Requiem pour un beau sans-coeur)	Robert Morin
Best Canadian Feature Film - Special Jury Citation	Léolo	Jean-Claude Lauzon
Best Canadian Feature Film - Special Jury Citation	Manufacturing Consent: Noam Chomsky and the Media	Peter Wintonick & Mark Achbar
Best Canadian Short Film	Letters of Transit (Les sauf-conduits)	Manon Briand
Best Canadian Short Film - Special Jury Citation	Blue	Don McKellar
Best Canadian Short Film - Special Jury Citation	The Fairy Who Didn't Want to Be a Fairy Anymore	Laurie Lynd
Best Canadian Short Film - Special Jury Citation	Moose Jaw: There's a Future in Our Past	Rick Hancox
Best Canadian Short Film - Special Jury Citation	My Niagara	Helen Lee
FIPRESCI International Critics' Award	Reservoir Dogs	Quentin Tarantino

== Programme ==
=== Gala Presentation ===
- Bad Lieutenant by Abel Ferrara
- Bob Roberts by Tim Robbins
- The Crying Game by Neil Jordan
- The Dark Side of the Heart by Eliseo Subiela
- Glengarry Glen Ross by James Foley
- Hard Boiled by John Woo
- Husbands and Wives by Woody Allen
- Laws of Gravity by Nick Gomez
- Léolo by Jean-Claude Lauzon
- Like Water for Chocolate by Alfonso Aráu
- El mariachi by Robert Rodriguez
- Mr. Saturday Night by Billy Crystal
- Of Mice and Men by Gary Sinise
- Passion Fish by John Sayles
- Peter's Friends by Kenneth Branagh
- The Public Eye by Howard Franklin
- Reservoir Dogs by Quentin Tarantino
- A River Runs Through It by Robert Redford
- Sarafina! by Darrell Roodt
- Simple Men by Hal Hartley
- Strictly Ballroom by Baz Luhrmann
- Zebrahead by Anthony Drazan

=== Canadian Perspective ===
- Being at Home with Claude by Jean Beaudin
- Blue by Don McKellar
- Buried on Sunday by Paul Donovan
- Careful by Guy Maddin
- Coleslaw Warehouse by Bruce McCulloch
- The Fairy Who Didn't Want to Be a Fairy Anymore by Laurie Lynd
- Forbidden Love: The Unashamed Stories of Lesbian Lives by Lynne Fernie and Aerlyn Weissman
- Gerda by Brenda Longfellow
- Giant Steps by Richard Rose
- Hurt Penguins by Robert Bergman and Myra Fried
- Impolite by David Hauka
- Letters of Transit (Les sauf-conduits) by Manon Briand
- Montreal Stories (Montréal vu par...) by Denys Arcand, Michel Brault, Atom Egoyan, Jacques Leduc, Léa Pool and Patricia Rozema
- Manufacturing Consent by Mark Achbar and Peter Wintonick
- Moose Jaw: There's a Future in Our Past by Rick Hancox
- My Niagara by Helen Lee
- Requiem for a Handsome Bastard (Requiem pour un beau sans-coeur) by Robert Morin
- The Saracen Woman (La Sarrasine) by Paul Tana
- Stepping Razor: Red X by Nicholas Campbell
- Tectonic Plates by Peter Mettler
- The Twist by Ron Mann

=== Midnight Madness ===
- Back to the USSR - takaisin Ryssiin by Jari Halonen
- Braindead by Peter Jackson
- Candyman by Bernard Rose
- Man Bites Dog by Benoît Poelvoorde, Rémy Belvaux and André Bonzel
- Romper Stomper by Geoffrey Wright
- Swordsman II by Ching Siu-tung
- Tetsuo II: Body Hammer by Shinya Tsukamoto
- Tokyo Decadence by Ryu Murakami

=== Documentaries ===
- Baraka by Ron Fricke
- Female Misbehavior by Monika Treut
- Manufacturing Consent: Noam Chomsky and the Media by Peter Wintonick and Mark Achbar
