= Bachman–Turner Overdrive discography =

- Studio albums: 10
- Live albums: 4
- Compilation albums: 14
- Singles: 28

This article is the discography of Canadian rock band Bachman–Turner Overdrive.

== Albums ==
=== Studio albums ===
Title	Details	Peak chart positions										Certifications
Title	Details	CAN	AUS	AUT	GER	NL	NOR	NZ	SWE	UK	US	Certifications
Bachman–Turner Overdrive	Released: May 17, 1973; Label: Mercury; Formats: LP, MC, 8-track	9	—	—	—	—	—	—	—	—	70	CAN: Platinum; RIAA: Gold
Bachman–Turner Overdrive II	Released: December 1973; Label: Mercury; Formats: LP, MC, 8-track	6	55	—	34	—	—	—	—	—	4	CAN: Platinum; RIAA: Gold
Not Fragile	Released: September 1974; Label: Mercury; Formats: LP, MC, 8-track	1	2	8	6	15	17	5	2	12	1	CAN: Platinum; RIAA: Gold; UK: Silver
Four Wheel Drive	Released: May 1975; Label: Mercury; Formats: LP, MC, 8-track	1	10	—	19	—	10	5	2	—	5	CAN: Platinum; RIAA: Gold
Head On	Released: December 1975; Label: Mercury; Formats: LP, MC, 8-track	3	54	—	—	—	—	7	8	—	23	CAN: Platinum; RIAA: Gold
Freeways	Released: February 1977; Label: Mercury; Formats: LP, MC, 8-track	34	—	—	—	—	—	—	41	—	70	CAN: Gold
Street Action	Released: February 1978; Label: Mercury; Formats: LP, MC, 8-track	62	—	—	—	—	—	—	—	—	130	
Rock n' Roll Nights	Released: March 1979; Label: Mercury; Formats: LP, MC, 8-track	—	—	—	—	—	—	—	—	—	165	
BTO	Released: September 1984; Label: Compleat; Formats: LP, MC	85	—	—	—	—	—	—	—	—	191	
Trial by Fire: Greatest & Latest	Released: 1996; Label: CMC; Formats: CD	—	—	—	—	—	—	—	—	—	—	
"—" denotes releases that did not chart or were not released

=== Live albums ===
Title	Details
B.T.O. Japan Tour Live	Released: 1977; Label: Mercury; Formats: LP; Recorded at Nippon Budokan in Tokyo on November 4, 1976
Live! Live! Live!	Released: July 1986; Label: Curb; Formats: CD, LP, MC; Recorded at The Moon in Tallahassee on August 1, 1985; Reissued in 1990 as All Time Greatest Hits Live
Best of Bachman–Turner Overdrive Live	Released: January 24, 1994; Label: Curb; Formats: CD, MC; More recordings from Tallahassee in 1985
King Biscuit Flower Hour: Bachman–Turner Overdrive	Released: April 7, 1998; Label: King Biscuit Flower Hour; Formats: CD; Recorded at Aragon Ballroom in Chicago on March 8, 1974

=== Compilation albums ===
Title	Details	Peak chart positions					Certifications
Title	Details	CAN	AUS	NZ	SWE	US	Certifications
Rock Is Our Life and These Are Our Songs	Released: 1975; Label: Mercury; Formats: LP	—	—	—	42	—	
Best of B.T.O. (So Far)	Released: July 1976; Label: Mercury; Formats: LP, MC, 8-track; Remastered and reissued in 1998 as Best of B.T.O. (Remastered Hits) with several additional tracks	7	84	21	—	19	CAN: Platinum; RIAA: Platinum
BTO's Greatest	Released: 1979; Label: Mercury; Formats: LP, MC; Released in the US and Canada in 1986	—	—	—	—	—	
You Ain't Seen Nothing Yet	Released: October 1983; Label: Mercury; Formats: LP, MC, 8-track; Released in the US in 1992	—	—	—	—	—	
The Anthology	Released: July 20, 1993; Label: Mercury; Formats: 2xCD	—	—	—	—	—	
Takin' Care of Business	Released: April 1998; Label: Spectrum Music, PolyGram; Formats: CD, MC	—	—	—	—	—	
20th Century Masters – The Millennium Collection: The Best of Bachman–Turner Overdrive	Released: September 26, 2000; Label: Mercury; Formats: CD	—	—	—	—	—	
The Collection	Released: March 2001; Label: Spectrum Music; Formats: CD	—	—	—	—	—	
Gold	Released: October 11, 2005; Label: Mercury; Formats: 2xCD, digital download	—	—	—	—	—	
The Definitive Collection	Released: February 5, 2008; Label: Mercury; Formats: CD, digital download	—	—	—	—	—	
Icon	Released: November 2, 2010; Label: Mercury; Formats: CD	—	—	—	—	—	
Bachman Turner Overdrive: 40th Anniversary	Released: September 4, 2012; Label: Universal, Ranbach Music; Formats: CD, digital download	—	—	—	—	—	
You Ain't Seen Nothing Yet: The Collection	Released: March 11, 2013; Label: Spectrum Music; Formats: CD, digital download	—	—	—	—	—	
Classic Album Set	Released: April 8, 2016; Label: Caroline; Formats: 8xCD box set	—	—	—	—	—	
"—" denotes releases that did not chart or were not released

== Singles ==
Single	Year	Peak chart positions										Certifications	Album
Single	Year	CAN	AUS	AUT	BEL (FL)	GER	NL	NZ	SA	UK	US	Certifications	Album
"Gimme Your Money Please"/"Little Gandy Dancer"	1973	45	—	—	—	—	—	—	—	—	—		Bachman–Turner Overdrive
"Blue Collar"	1973	21	—	—	—	—	—	—	—	—	68		Bachman–Turner Overdrive
"Stayed Awake All Night" (UK-only release)	1973	—	—	—	—	—	—	—	—	—	—		Bachman–Turner Overdrive
"Down and Out Man" (Japan-only release)	1973	—	—	—	—	—	—	—	—	—	—		Bachman–Turner Overdrive
"Let It Ride"	1974	3	—	—	—	—	—	—	—	—	23		Bachman–Turner Overdrive II
"Give It Time" (France-only release)	1974	—	—	—	—	—	—	—	—	—	—		Bachman–Turner Overdrive II
"Takin' Care of Business"	1974	3	14	—	—	—	—	—	—	—	12		Bachman–Turner Overdrive II
"You Ain't Seen Nothing Yet"	1974	1	4	3	6	1	3	1	1	2	1	RIAA: Gold	Not Fragile
"Not Fragile" (France-only release)	1974	—	—	—	—	—	—	—	—	—	—		Not Fragile
"Roll On Down the Highway"	1975	4	80	—	—	18	25	20	—	22	14		Not Fragile
"Hey You"	1975	1	80	14	—	9	—	10	2	—	21		Four Wheel Drive
"Quick Change Artist"	1975	13	—	—	—	—	—	—	—	—	—		Four Wheel Drive
"Down to the Line"	1975	13	—	—	—	—	—	—	—	—	43		Non-album single
"Take It Like a Man"	1976	24	—	—	—	—	—	—	—	—	33		Head On
"Away from Home" (UK-only release)	1976	—	—	—	—	—	—	—	—	—	—		Head On
"Lookin' Out for #1"	1976	40	—	—	—	—	14	—	—	—	65 (Note: "Lookin' Out for Number 1" also reached number 15 on the Adult Contemporary Singles Chart.)		Head On
"Gimme Your Money Please" (reissue)	1976	47	—	—	—	—	—	—	—	—	70		Best of B.T.O. (So Far)
"My Wheels Won't Turn"	1977	54	—	—	—	—	—	—	—	—	— (Note: "My Wheels Won't Turn" didn't enter the Billboard Hot 100, but did peak at number 84 on the Cash Box Singles Chart.)		Freeways
"Life Still Goes On (I'm Lonely)"	1977	77	—	—	—	—	—	—	—	—	—		Freeways
"Shotgun Rider"	1977	—	—	—	—	—	—	—	—	—	—		Freeways
"Down, Down" (Germany-only release)	1977	—	—	—	—	—	—	—	—	—	—		Freeways
"Down the Road"	1978	91	—	—	—	—	—	—	—	—	— (Note: "Down the Road" didn't enter the Billboard Hot 100, but did peak at number 92 on the Cash Box Singles Chart.)		Street Action
"Jamaica"	1979	—	—	—	—	—	—	—	—	—	—		Rock n' Roll Nights
"Heartaches"	1979	32	—	—	—	—	—	—	—	—	60		Rock n' Roll Nights
"Service with a Smile"	1984	—	—	—	—	—	—	—	—	—	—		BTO
"For the Weekend"	1984	—	—	—	—	—	—	—	—	—	83		BTO
"My Sugaree"	1985	—	—	—	—	—	—	—	—	—	—		BTO
"Wooly Bully"	1989	80	—	—	—	—	—	—	—	—	—		American Boyfriends soundtrack
"The House of the Rising Sun" (Europe-only release)	1996	—	—	—	—	—	—	—	—	—	—		Trial by Fire: Greatest & Latest
"—" denotes releases that did not chart or were not released in that territory.
