= Terreur 404 =

French-Canadian horror webseries

- Genre: Horror
- Written by: Samuel Archibald; William S. Messier
- Directed by: Sébastien Diaz
- Composer: Sébastien Diaz
- No. of seasons: 2
- No. of episodes: 15 (list of episodes)

Production
- Production company: Productions Casablanca

Original release
- Network: Tou.tv
- Release: March 30, 2017 – October 31, 2018

Terreur 404 is a French-Canadian horror anthology webseries directed by Sébastien Diaz and written by Samuel Archibald and William S. Messier. The series is exclusively available via Tou.tv.

== Series overview ==
Season	Episodes	Originally released
1	8	March 31, 2017
2	7	November 1, 2018

== Episodes ==
=== Season 1 (2017) ===
No. in season	Title	Directed by	Written by	Original release date
1	"Ma première morte (My first dead)"	Sébastien Diaz	Samuel Archibald & William S. Messier	March 31, 2017
2	"Course de nuit (Night ride)"	Sébastien Diaz	Samuel Archibald & William S. Messier	March 31, 2017
3	"Une demande d'amitié (A friendship request)"	Sébastien Diaz	Samuel Archibald & William S. Messier	March 31, 2017
4	"La maison des amants (Lovers' house)"	Sébastien Diaz	Samuel Archibald & William S. Messier	May 17, 2017
5	"Le virus (The virus)"	Sébastien Diaz	Samuel Archibald & William S. Messier	May 17, 2017
6	"Monsieur Parfait (Mister Perfect)"	Sébastien Diaz	Samuel Archibald & William S. Messier	May 17, 2017
7	"Chirurgie d'un jour (One day surgery)"	Sébastien Diaz	Samuel Archibald & William S. Messier	May 17, 2017
8	"Maman j'ai peur (Mommy I'm afraid)"	Sébastien Diaz	Samuel Archibald & William S. Messier	May 17, 2017

=== Season 2 (2018) ===
No. in season	Title	Directed by	Written by	Original release date
1	"Marie Noire (Black Mary)"	Sébastien Diaz	Samuel Archibald & William S. Messier	October 31, 2018
2	"Le monde des morts (World of the dead)"	Sébastien Diaz	Samuel Archibald & William S. Messier	October 31, 2018
3	"Krystelle"	Sébastien Diaz	Samuel Archibald & William S. Messier	October 31, 2018
4	"Le cinquième passager (The fifth passenger)"	Sébastien Diaz	Samuel Archibald & William S. Messier	October 31, 2018
5	"Le Nahual (The Nahual)"	Sébastien Diaz	Samuel Archibald & William S. Messier	October 31, 2018
6	"Le trajet (The run)"	Sébastien Diaz	Samuel Archibald & William S. Messier	October 31, 2018
7	"Place des frênes (Ash trees square)"	Sébastien Diaz	Samuel Archibald & William S. Messier	October 31, 2018

== Reception ==
The series was widely praised as a French-Canadian project garnering international recognition. It has been called a "Canadian Black Mirror".

=== Awards ===
Year	Organisation	Award	Result
2017	Seoul Webfest	Best Horror Series	Won
2017	Russia Realist Web Fest	Best webseries	Won
2017	Webfest Berlin	Best action/suspense/thriller series Grand Jury Prize	Won
2018	Toronto T.O Webfest	Best Canadian Series	Won
2018	Prix Gémeaux	Best original series for digital media Best writing for an original series for digital media	Won
