= It's a Party =

It's a Party may refer to:

== Film and television ==
- It's a Party!, a 1986 short film directed by Peg Campbell
- "It's a Party" (Project Runway), a 2010 TV episode

== Music ==
- It's a Party, a 2000 album by Hi-5

=== Songs ===
- "It's a Party" (Busta Rhymes song), 1996
- "It's a Party", by Buckcherry from All Night Long, 2010
- "It's a Party", by the Subways from Money and Celebrity, 2011
- "It's a Party", by Tamia from More (non-album track), 2004
- "It's a Party", by Vanilla Ice from To the Extreme, 1990
- "It's a Party", by OsamaSon from Psykotic, 2025
