= Giuditta del Vecchio =

Italian actress

- Born: 1 July 1967
- Occupation: Actress
- Years active: 1988–2006

Giuditta del Vecchio is an Italian actress, known for her roles in the 1992 Canadian film Léolo and the 1996 Italian film The Nymph. Del Vecchio is featured prominently on the cover of the 1996 re-release of the album Tiger Bay by the English band Saint Etienne.

== Filmography ==
- Snack Bar Budapest (1988)
- Disperatamente Giulia (1989)
- Quiet Days in Clichy (1990)
- La bocca (1991)
- Léolo (1992)
- La famiglia Ricordi (1995)
- RDF - Rumori di fondo (1996)
- The Nymph (1996)
- The Sweet Sounds of Life (1999)
