= Aloka McLean =

Canadian actress (born 1981)

Aloka Chandra McLean (born December 21, 1981, in Halifax, Nova Scotia) is a Canadian actress. She is most noted for her role in the film The Lotus Eaters, for which she received a Genie Award nomination for Best Actress at the 14th Genie Awards in 1993. The Lotus Eaters was her first film role; around the same time, she had her first stage role playing Helen Keller in a Vancouver production of The Miracle Worker.

McLean also made guest appearances in the television series Neon Rider, The X-Files and Are You Afraid of the Dark?, and the television films Justice for Annie: A Moment of Truth Movie and Songs in Ordinary Time.

== Awards and nominations ==
Year	Award	Category	Title of work	Result
1993	Genie Award	Best Performance by an Actress in a Leading Role	The Lotus Eaters	Nominated
