= Thirty Two Short Films About Glenn Gould =

- Original Canadian theatrical release poster
- Directed by: François Girard
- Written by: François Girard; Don McKellar
- Produced by: Michael Allder; Niv Fichman; Barbara Willis Sweete; Larry Weinstein
- Starring: Colm Feore; Derek Keurvorst; Katya Ladan
- Cinematography: Alain Dostie
- Edited by: Gaétan Huot
- Music by: Glenn Gould
- Distributed by: Rhombus Media; The Samuel Goldwyn Company
- Release dates: September 7, 1993 (Venice); September 14, 1993 (Toronto)
- Running time: 98 minutes
- Country: Canada
- Languages: English; French
- Box office: $1.3 million (U.S.)

Thirty Two Short Films About Glenn Gould is a 1993 Canadian biographical anthology film about the pianist Glenn Gould, played by Colm Feore. It was directed by François Girard, with a screenplay by Girard and Don McKellar.

The film is presented as a series of 31 short films rather than as one narrative. Segments include documentaries, consisting of interviews with individuals who knew the real Gould, and reenactments of episodes in Gould's life. "Gould Meets McLaren" employs animated spheres from Norman McLaren's filmography. The film received positive reviews and won four Genie Awards, including Best Motion Picture.

== Plot ==
With memories revolving around the family's cottage near Lake Simcoe, Glenn Gould recalls how in his childhood, he had ostensibly made the decision to become a concert pianist at age five. In fact, he believes his mother had already chosen that career for him. He recalls being able to read music before he could read books, and learned the music of Johann Sebastian Bach from his mother. Gould later imagines interviewing himself, in which he confronts himself about why he chose to quit giving concerts at the age of 32, preferring to communicate to his audience through media instead. Gould reminds himself that the musician is inescapably an autocrat, no matter how benign.

In crafting radio documentaries, Gould works on a piece called The Idea of North, which touches on the effects the environment has on the solitude and isolation of the people of Northern Canada. In a media interview, Gould reveals that The Idea of North is one of only five of his documentaries about isolation, and that he intends to make a comedy next because he is tired of serious expression. Interviewers also push him to explain how he could achieve his level of musical perfection without interest in being overly technical in his piano playing. They ask why he insists on being interviewed only over the telephone. Others question if Gould's supposed obsession in technology is merely a smokescreen to keep his distance from real people.

As the markets plummet, Gould picks up word from the bodyguard of the visiting Sheik Yamani to invest in an obscure company called Sotex Resources, which is set to benefit from an exploration contract. Gould becomes the only client to profit in the wake of financial meltdown. However, Margaret Pacsu, a friend, notices Gould's bathroom is stocked heavily with various pills, including Valium, Trifluoperazine and Librax. Gould laughs off the idea that he is taking all of the pills simultaneously, and Pacsu does not notice any effects on his personality. As his birthday approaches, Gould becomes concerned that no one will attend his funeral, despite being aware of strong record sales in Central Europe and Japan. Gould dies at age 50 of a stroke. His cousin, Jessie Greig, says Gould was wrong and his funeral was heavily attended. He had noted that Voyager I and Voyager II, space probes launched for possible contact with extraterrestrial intelligence, contain Bach's music as played by Gould.

=== Segments ===
1. Aria
2. Lake Simcoe
3. Forty-Five Seconds and a Chair
4. Bruno Monsaingeon: musician and collaborator
5. Gould Meets Gould: text by Glenn Gould
6. Hamburg
7. Variation in C minor
8. Practice
9. The L.A. Concert
10. CD318
11. Yehudi Menuhin: violinist
12. Passion According to Gould
13. Opus 1: a composition by Glenn Gould
14. Crossed Paths
15. Truck Stop
16. The Idea of North: a radio documentary by Glenn Gould
17. Solitude
18. Questions with No Answers
19. A Letter
20. Gould Meets McLaren: animation by Norman McLaren
21. The Tip
22. Personal Ad
23. Pills
24. Margaret Pacsu: friend
25. Diary of One Day
26. Motel Wawa
27. Forty-Nine
28. Jessie Greig: cousin
29. Leaving
30. Voyager
31. Aria
32. Credits

== Production ==
=== Development ===
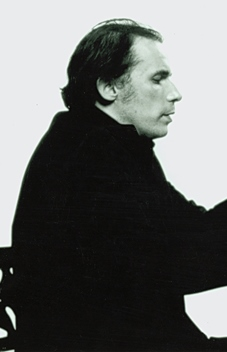
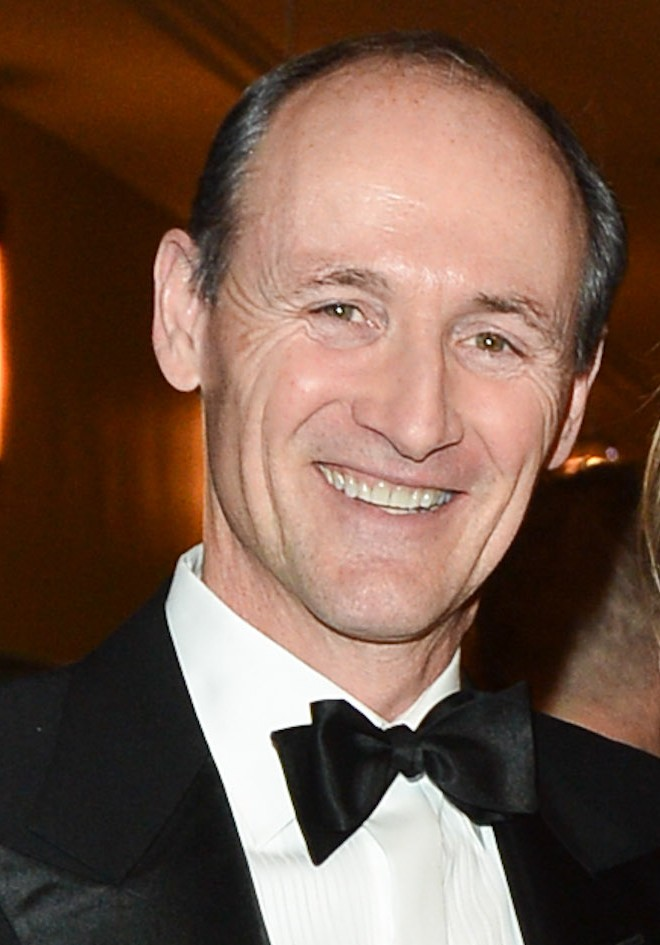
Glenn Gould is played by Colm Feore.

Rhombus Media was established in 1979 with the goal to make a film about pianist Glenn Gould, who was still alive at the time. Producer Niv Fichman explained, "He was our greatest hero. So we thought we would have to make a few short films before we approached Gould to make one about him". After Gould died in 1982, director François Girard mentioned the idea of making a biopic of the pianist in 1990, reviving Fichman's plans.

Wishing to have an English Canadian screenwriter, Fichman and Girard proposed the idea to Don McKellar, who had a musical education. McKellar was initially opposed to the idea of adapting Gould's life into a film, calling it "an undramatic life". However, Girard's concept of 32 "short films" intrigued him. McKellar claimed to write the humorous aspects of the screenplay, while Girard was responsible for the trivia. Girard opted to model the screenplay after Bach's Goldberg Variations, which Gould had performed.

Girard found writing challenging, saying, "As Gould was such a complex character, the biggest problem was to find a way to look at his work and deal with his visions. The film is built of fragments, each one trying to capture an aspect of Gould. There is no way of putting Gould in one box. The film gives the viewer 32 impressions of him. I didn't want to reduce him to one dimension." The fact that the concept allowed for 32 segments led to the combination of documentary, fictional and "abstract" scenes, with Girard saying "I allowed myself to play the game to its limits". The budget was $1.8 million.

Actor Colm Feore watched available video and listened to sound recordings of Gould in order to develop his performance. He also read through 6,000 of Gould's letters.

=== Filming ===
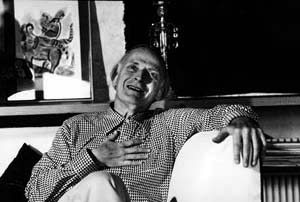
Violinist Yehudi Menuhin was interviewed for the film.

Girard took the first shots in Hamburg in August 1992, while Gould's genuine Steinway grand piano was moved to a church in Toronto for principal photography. Most filming took place in Toronto and Montreal. Feore and the filmmakers also shot scenes in Lake Saint Pierre in December 1992, for the scenes set in Northern Canada.

The animation in the "Gould Meets McLaren" segment is clipped from Norman McLaren's film Spheres, published in 1969. Violinist Yehudi Menuhin was among those interviewed for the film.

=== Music ===
The soundtrack consists almost entirely of piano recordings by Gould. It includes pieces famously linked with him, such as Bach: The Goldberg Variations, and the Well-Tempered Clavier. It also features the prelude to Richard Wagner's Tristan und Isolde in the "Lake Simcoe" segment.

Sony Classical released a soundtrack album on CD in 1994. This was part of a strategy to obtain video rights for certain films, with the CD release timed to match the U.S. cinematic release in April.

== Release ==
Thirty Two Short Films About Glenn Gould debuted at the Venice Film Festival in September 1993, where it received positive reviews. It also played at the Toronto International Film Festival in September 1993. In 1994, it was one of 26 films featured in the Miami International Film Festival.

Rhombus Media and Max Films was the Canadian distributor, and after the Toronto festival, made plans for an initial release in Montreal and Toronto. In the U.S., it was distributed by The Samuel Goldwyn Company, and opened in New York City on 14 April 1994.

The Canadian Film Institute restored the film, and in co-operation with TIFF, it was played at Library and Archives Canada in January 2009. A DVD was released in Region 1 in 2012.

== Reception ==
=== Critical reception ===
Roger Ebert awarded the film four out of four stars, praising it for parting with the customary biopic format and challenging viewers to imagine themselves as Gould. Janet Maslin of The New York Times assessed it as smart and highly interesting. The Washington Post critic Desson Howe described the segments as exciting and revealing. In Variety, Leonard Klady cited it as a rare film for achieving a picture of both an artist and the artist's work. For Newsweek, David Ansen called it an "elegant, coolly funny movie". The New Republic critic Stanley Kauffmann said it offered "teasing yet satisfactory glimpses- vivid, funny, cranky, passionate, eremitic, humane".

In 2012, The New Yorker's Richard Brody wrote the film used unique methods to find Gould's brilliance. In his 2015 Movie Guide, Leonard Maltin gave it two and a half stars, criticizing it as "too fragmented". The film has a 93% rating on Rotten Tomatoes, based on 27 reviews with the consensus: "Befitting its singularly brilliant subject, Thirty Two Short Films About Glenn Gould captures the essence of a life and legacy while flouting biopic conventions."

=== Year-end lists ===
- 4th – Gene Siskel, The Chicago Tribune
- 4th – Kenneth Turan, Los Angeles Times
- 4th – Janet Maslin, The New York Times
- 6th – Steve Persall, St. Petersburg Times
- 7th – Scott Schuldt, The Oklahoman
- 9th – Yardena Arar, Los Angeles Daily News
- Top 10 (not ranked) – Howie Movshovitz, The Denver Post
- Honorable mention – Betsy Pickle, Knoxville News-Sentinel
- Honorable mention – David Elliott, The San Diego Union-Tribune
- Honorable mention – Robert Denerstein, Rocky Mountain News

=== Accolades ===
Award	Date of ceremony	Category	Recipient(s)	Result	Ref(s)
Genie Awards	12 December 1993	Best Motion Picture	Niv Fichman	Won	
Genie Awards	12 December 1993	Best Direction	François Girard	Won	
Genie Awards	12 December 1993	Best Screenplay	Don McKellar and François Girard	Nominated	
Genie Awards	12 December 1993	Best Supporting Actress	Kate Hennig	Nominated	
Genie Awards	12 December 1993	Best Cinematography	Alain Dostie	Won	
Genie Awards	12 December 1993	Best Editing	Gaétan Huot	Won	
Independent Spirit Awards	25 March 1995	Best Foreign Film	François Girard	Nominated	
Prix Italia	1995	Special Prize for Fiction	Thirty Two Short Films About Glenn Gould	Won	
São Paulo International Film Festival	21 October – 4 November 1993	Jury Prize	François Girard	Won	

== Legacy ==
Girard and McKellar employed a few crew members from Thirty Two Short Films About Glenn Gould for their next film, The Red Violin (1998). Cinematographer Alain Dostie, editor Gaétan Huot and Feore were among those who reunited for the project.

The TV series The Simpsons paid homage to the film with the title of the seventh season episode "22 Short Films About Springfield", which aired on 14 April 1996. The A.V. Club asserted many viewers in 1996 would have understood the title, noting the series Animaniacs also produced a 1996 short entitled "Ten Short Films About Wakko Warner".
