= The Mighty Jungle (American TV series) =

- Genre: Comedy
- Starring: Francis Guinan; Charlene Fernetz; Molly Atkinson; Noah Shebib; Sylvie Loeillet; Patrick McKenna
- Voices of: Tony Danza; Delta Burke; David Fowler; Clara Duverne; P.J. Heslin
- Countries of origin: Canada; United States
- Original language: English
- No. of seasons: 1
- No. of episodes: 26

Production
- Running time: 30 minutes
- Production companies: Le Sabre; Goodman/Rosen Productions; Alliance Communications; TriStar Television

Original release
- Network: The Family Channel
- Release: January 2 – November 13, 1994

The Mighty Jungle is a sitcom that ran on The Family Channel from January 2 to November 13, 1994. It starred Francis Guinan as Dan Winfield, a family man who is the only one who knows that the animals in his backyard zoo can speak. Voices included Tony Danza and Delta Burke.

== Cast ==
=== Main ===
- Francis Guinan as Dan Winfield
- Charlene Fernetz as Susan Winfield
- Molly Atkinson as Alison Winfield
- Noah Shebib as Andrew Winfield
- Sylvie Loeillet as Sylvia
- Patrick McKenna as Kenneth Crisp

=== Recurring ===
- Tony Danza as the voice of Vinnie the alligator
- Delta Burke as the voice of Viola the toucan
- David Fowler as the voice of Winston the orangutan
- Clara Duverne as the puppeteer of Winston
- P.J. Heslin as the voice of Jack the sea lion
