= My American Cousin =

- Directed by: Sandy Wilson
- Written by: Sandy Wilson
- Produced by: Peter O'Brian
- Starring: Margaret Langrick
- Cinematography: Richard Leiterman
- Edited by: Haida Paul
- Distributed by: Spectrafilm
- Release dates: 5 September 1985 (Premiere); 1 November 1985 (Toronto)
- Running time: 90 minutes
- Country: Canada
- Language: English
- Budget: C$1.3 million

My American Cousin is a Canadian drama film, released in 1985. Written and directed by Sandy Wilson based on her own childhood, the film stars Margaret Langrick as Sandy Wilcox, a preteen girl growing up on a ranch in rural Penticton, British Columbia in the late 1950s. Sandy's longing to be treated as an adult is roused even further when her older American cousin Butch Walker (John Wildman) comes for a visit. The cast also includes Richard Donat, Jane Mortifee, Babz Chula and Camille Henderson.

A 2006 On Screen! documentary about the film featured interviews with director Sandy Wilson and leading actress Margaret Langrick.

The sequel to this film, American Boyfriends, was released in 1989.

== Production ==
The film was originally budgeted at C$700,000 to C$800,000 but after involvement (and funding) from Telefilm Canada, they suggested that the budget be increased, and it eventually cost C$1.3 million. Telefilm Canada's Broadcast Fund invested C$450,000 in return for licensing the film to CBC Television.

== Release ==
The film was first shown at the Toronto Festival of Festivals. It was due to be aired on CBC Television on October 8, 1985 but due to its good reception, its television debut was pushed back and the film opened in one theatre in Toronto on November 1, 1985 and grossed C$13,500 in its first week.

== Reception ==
Nina Darnton in The New York Times called the film "an amazing job of evoking through specific detail, costumes, props and attitudes a period many of us still blush to remember".

== Awards ==
My American Cousin won six awards at the 7th Genie Awards, including Best Picture, Best Director (Wilson), Best Original Screenplay (Wilson), Best Actor (Wildman), Best Actress (Langrick) and Best Film Editing (Haida Paul).

The film was also nominated for Best Supporting Actor (Donat), Best Sound, Best Sound Editing, Best Art Direction and Best Costume Design, but did not win those awards.
