= Pearl's Diner =

- Directed by: Lynn Smith
- Produced by: Lynn Smith
- Music by: Zander Ary
- Release date: 1992
- Running time: 15 minutes
- Country: Canada

Pearl's Diner is a Canadian animated short film, directed by Lynn Smith and released in 1992. Using cutout animation, the film depicts the interactions of Pearl, a waitress in a diner, with her customers.

The film won the Genie Award for Best Animated Short Film at the 14th Genie Awards.
