= Peg Campbell =

Canadian filmmaker

Peg Campbell is a Canadian filmmaker. She is most noted for her short films It's a Party!, which was a Genie Award nominee for Best Live Action Short Drama at the 8th Genie Awards, and In Search of the Last Good Man, which won the same award at the 11th Genie Awards.

Her other films have included Street Kids (1985), a documentary about youth homelessness; Too Close for Comfort (1990), a short docudrama about an HIV-positive teenager; and Your Mother Should Know (2008), a documentary film about mother-daughter relationships.

She is a professor of film and video at Emily Carr University of Art and Design.
