= Nadine Bismuth =

Canadian writer

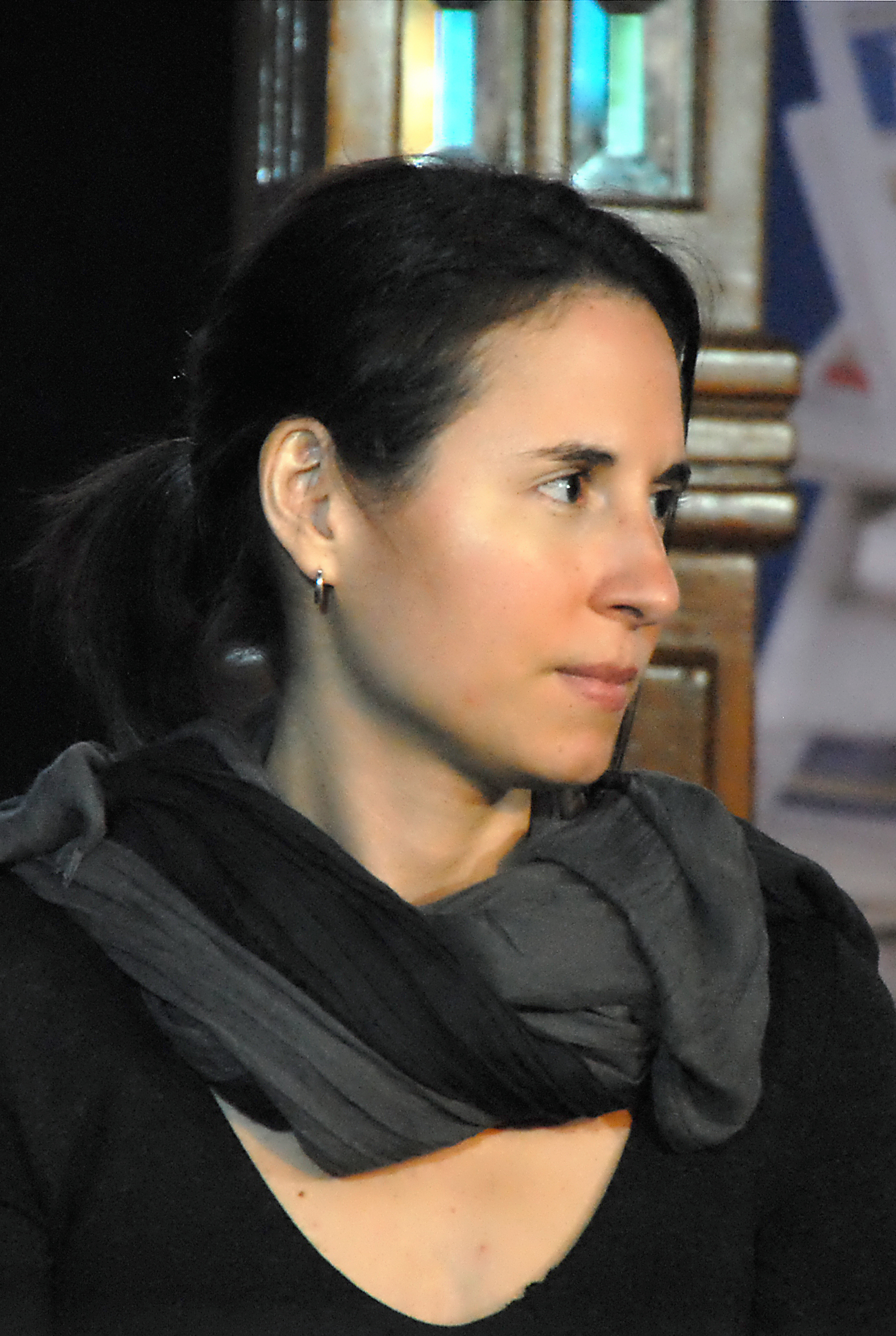
- Born: July 15, 1975; Montreal, Quebec, Canada
- Education: McGill University
- Writing career
- Notable works: Êtes-vous mariée à un psychopathe ?, Un lien familial

Nadine Bismuth (born July 15, 1975) is a Canadian writer from Montreal, Quebec. She is most noted for her short story collection Êtes-vous mariée à un psychopathe?, which was a shortlisted finalist for the Governor General's Award for French-language fiction at the 2009 Governor General's Awards, and her novel Un lien familial, which won the 2020 edition of Le Combat des livres.

The novel was defended in Le Combat des livres by singer France D'Amour.

She is a graduate of McGill University.

== Works ==
=== Novels ===
- Scrapbook, 2004

English translation by Susan Ouriou, 2009

- Un lien familial, 2018

English translation A Family Affair by Russell Smith, 2020

=== Short story collections ===
- Les gens fidèles ne font pas les nouvelles, 1999

English translation Fidelity Doesn't Make the News by Susan Ouriou, 2008

- Sédentaires, 2004
- Êtes-vous mariée à un psychopathe ?, 2009

English translation Are You Married to a Psychopath by Donald Winkler, 2010
