= Thomas Burstyn =

Canadian cinematographer

Thomas Burstyn (born 1954 in Montreal, Quebec), sometimes credited as Tom Burstyn, is a Canadian cinematographer and documentary filmmaker. He is most noted for his work on the 1995 film Magic in the Water, for which he won the Genie Award for Best Cinematography at the 16th Genie Awards. He was nominated in the same category on two other occasions, at the 10th Genie Awards in 1989 for The Tadpole and the Whale (La Grenouille et la baleine), and at the 14th Genie Awards in 1993 for The Lotus Eaters.

As a filmmaker he directed the documentary film Some Kind of Love, for which he received a Canadian Screen Award nomination for Best Cinematography in a Documentary at the 4th Canadian Screen Awards in 2016.

He moved to New Zealand in the 2000s after marrying New Zealand filmmaker Barbara Sumner, with whom he cofounded the production company Cloud South Films.
