= Too Close for Comfort (film) =

1990 Canadian short film

- Directed by: Peg Campbell
- Written by: Gay Hawley; Cindy Leaney
- Produced by: Gay Hawley
- Starring: Stephen Fanning; Peter Stebbings
- Edited by: Bill Campbell
- Production company: Wild Ginger Productions
- Distributed by: Canadian Filmmakers Distribution Centre
- Release date: December 1, 1990 (Vancouver)
- Running time: 25 minutes
- Country: Canada
- Language: English

Too Close for Comfort is a Canadian docudrama short film, directed by Peg Campbell and released in 1990. Created as an educational film about HIV/AIDS, the film explores the effects on a group of high school students when one of them is involuntarily outed as HIV-positive.

== Synopsis ==
The film stars Stephen Fanning as Nick, a high school basketball player who is fired from his after-school job at a video store when his boss is informed of his HIV status. As the information spreads, some of Nick's friends immediately reject him because they incorrectly assume that he is gay.

However, some of his other friends rally around him and start to work on an educational video about HIV and homophobia, inserting the film's educational component as they interview real people living with HIV about the disease. The film also simultaneously follows the progression of David (Peter Stebbings) from being the person who first tipped off their friends about what happened at the video store, through joining the filmmaking project, to revealing that he has himself been struggling with internalized homophobia around his own sexuality.

== Background ==
Director Peg Campbell says that when she shared the film's story plot with grade 11 students in various Canadian schools, she was shocked to learn that the students all stated they would automatically assume the guy was gay, and they would shun him as a friend, and trash talk him. She further said that it was unfortunate that all these young people "felt AIDS is a homosexual disease", and they were not obligated to do anything about it because "they're not needle users or gays."

== Release ==
The film premiered at the Pacific Cinémathèque on 1 December 1990. It was subsequently distributed for use in schools, along with a study guide on HIV and anti-homophobia education. An extended version of the film's documentary component was also separately released in 1991 under the title Eric's Video.

== Reception ==
Stan Persky wrote in The Vancouver Sun that "the film is a thoroughly engrossing, poignant, politically intelligent and genuinely educational piece of local moviemaking." He also notes that the "point of Campbell's deftly crafted work is to explore the attitudes of Nick's circle of suddenly uneasy teen friends towards sexual preferences and life-threatening diseases."

The film won the TVOntario Prize for Best Youth Documentary at the 1992 Banff Television Festival.
