= It's a Party! =

1986 Canadian short film

- Directed by: Peg Campbell
- Written by: Peggy Thompson; Peg Campbell
- Produced by: Peggy Thompson; Peg Campbell
- Distributed by: Canadian Filmmakers Distribution Centre
- Release date: 1986
- Running time: 12 minutes
- Country: Canada
- Language: English

It's a Party! is a Canadian comedy-drama short film, directed by Peg Campbell and released in 1986. Set in the apartment of a woman who is having a party, the film uses a stationary camera facing her hallway and living room, with actors moving in and out of the frame as the party's events evolve and change, while the film's dialogue was improvised by the filmmakers and actors based on strange or odd things they had personally heard at parties.

The film was a Genie Award nominee for Best Live Action Short Drama at the 8th Genie Awards.

Campbell and cowriter Peggy Thompson followed up in 1989 with In Search of the Last Good Man, which reversed the formula by using a rapidly moving camera to film a story with limited in-film movement.
