= Harmony Cats =

- Directed by: Sandy Wilson
- Written by: David King
- Produced by: Richard Davis, George Johnson, Alan Morinis
- Starring: Kim Coates, Jim Byrnes, Lisa Brokop, Charlene Fernetz, Hoyt Axton
- Cinematography: Philip Linzey
- Edited by: Debra Rurak
- Music by: Bill Buckingham, Graeme Coleman
- Distributed by: C/FP Distribution
- Release date: April 27, 1992
- Running time: 104 minutes
- Country: Canada
- Language: English

Harmony Cats is a 1992 Canadian comedy film, directed by Sandy Wilson.

== Plot ==
Harmony Cats is about a violinist named Graham Braithwaite (Kim Coates) who plays with a British Columbia symphony. One day, the symphony stops playing permanently and Graham is left to find work elsewhere. He joins a country music band as a bassist and becomes caught between members of the new band.

== Production ==
The film received $333,140 from BC Film.

== Recognition ==
Award	Date of ceremony	Category	Nominees	Result	Reference
Genie Awards	December 12, 1993	Best Picture	Richard Davis, Alan Morinis	Nominated	
Genie Awards	December 12, 1993	Best Director	Sandy Wilson	Nominated	
Genie Awards	December 12, 1993	Best Supporting Actor	Jim Byrnes	Nominated	
Genie Awards	December 12, 1993	Best Supporting Actress	Charlene Fernetz	Nominated	
Genie Awards	December 12, 1993	Best Screenplay	David King	Nominated	
Genie Awards	December 12, 1993	Best Art Direction/Production Design	Lynne Stopkewich	Nominated	
Genie Awards	December 12, 1993	Best Cinematography	Philip Linzey	Nominated	
Genie Awards	December 12, 1993	Best Costume Design	Sharon Fedoruk	Nominated	
Genie Awards	December 12, 1993	Best Editing	Debra Rurak	Nominated	
Genie Awards	December 12, 1993	Best Overall Sound	Dean Giammarco, Paul A. Sharpe, Bill Sheppard, Daryl Powell	Nominated	
Genie Awards	December 12, 1993	Best Sound Editing	Shane Shemko, Anke Bakker, Alison Grace, Cam Wagner	Nominated	

== Works cited ==
- Gasher, Mike (2002). Hollywood North: The Feature Film Industry in British Columbia. University of British Columbia Press.
