= In Search of the Last Good Man =

1989 Canadian short film

- Directed by: Peg Campbell
- Written by: Peggy Thompson; Peg Campbell
- Produced by: Peggy Thompson; Peg Campbell
- Distributed by: Canadian Filmmakers Distribution Centre
- Release date: 1989
- Running time: 10 minutes
- Country: Canada
- Language: English

In Search of the Last Good Man is a Canadian comedy-drama short film, directed by Peg Campbell and released in 1989. Cowritten with Peggy Thompson as a follow-up to their 1986 short film It's a Party!, the film blends live action and animation to depict a group of women in a coffee shop talking about their relationships with men.

Campbell described the film as "an experiment in camera movement, using a dolly to create a constant sense of swooping movement."

The film won the Genie Award for Best Live Action Short Drama at the 11th Genie Awards.
