= Esther Valiquette =

Canadian artist and documentary film director (1962–1994)

Esther Valiquette (November 1962 – September 8, 1994) was a Canadian documentary film director. She is most noted for her 1992 documentary film The Measure of Your Passage (Le singe bleu), which won the award for Best Short Film at the 1993 Rendez-vous Québec Cinéma, and the Genie Award for Best Short Documentary at the 14th Genie Awards in 1993.

Originally from Arthabaska, Quebec, she studied arts the Université de Montréal. Following her graduation she joined the National Film Board of Canada as a trainee in its Studio D unit for women, and worked in a variety of technical roles on productions for the company. After being diagnosed with HIV/AIDS in 1989, she directed the AIDS-themed documentary film The Story of A (Le Récit d'A), which was released in 1990. The film recounted the struggles of an HIV-positive man named Andrew. In 1992, she released The Measure of Your Passage, an essay film which presented her own philosophical explorations of mortality through the prism of a reflection on the collapse of the ancient Minoan civilization.

Valiquette died of AIDS on September 8, 1994.

== See also ==
- List of female film and television directors
