= Samuel Archibald (writer) =

Canadian writer

- Born: 1978 (age 47–48); Arvida, Quebec, Canada
- Occupation: writer
- Writing career
- Period: 2010s-present
- Notable work: Arvida

Samuel Archibald (born 1978) is a Canadian writer. He is best known for his short story collection Arvida, which won the Prix Coup de cœur Renaud-Bray in 2012, and was defended by Bernard Landry in the 2013 edition of Le Combat des livres. Its English translation by Donald Winkler was a shortlisted nominee for the 2015 Scotiabank Giller Prize.

Born in Arvida, Quebec, Archibald is a professor of film and literature at the Université du Québec à Montréal. He was formerly married to writer Geneviève Pettersen.

== Works ==
- Arvida (2011)
- Quinze pour cent (2013)
