= Breaking a Leg: Robert Lepage and the Echo Project =

1992 Canadian documentary film

- Directed by: Donald Winkler
- Written by: William Brind
- Produced by: Donald Winkler
- Starring: Robert Lepage
- Narrated by: Marion McCormick
- Cinematography: André-Luc Dupont
- Edited by: Judith Merritt
- Production company: National Film Board of Canada
- Release date: 1992
- Running time: 43 minutes
- Country: Canada
- Language: English

Breaking a Leg: Robert Lepage and the Echo Project is a Canadian short documentary film, directed by Donald Winkler and released in 1992. An examination of the creative process, the film follows theatre director Robert Lepage as he works on Echo, the 1989 theatre production which would become Lepage's first significant popular and critical failure as a theatre director.

The film was a Genie Award nominee for Best Short Documentary at the 14th Genie Awards in 1993.
