= Rick Hancox =

Canadian filmmaker

Rick Hancox (born January 1, 1946) is a Canadian filmmaker and film studies academic. He is most noted for his mid-length documentary film Moose Jaw: There's a Future in Our Past, which received a special jury citation for the Toronto International Film Festival Award for Best Canadian Short Film at the 1992 Toronto International Film Festival.

He spent much of his childhood in Moose Jaw, Saskatchewan, the son of former Moose Jaw Times-Herald publisher William Hancox, before the family moved to Prince Edward Island in his teens. The film was an essay on the ways the city had changed by the time he returned to visit as an adult.

A graduate of Ohio University and New York University's Tisch School of the Arts, he taught film studies at Sheridan College from 1973 to 1985, and joined Concordia University in 1986. His other films have included Rose (1968), Cab 16 (1969), I, a Dog (1970), Tall Dark Stranger (1970), Next to Me (1971), Rooftops (1971), House Movie (1972), Wild Sync (1973), Home for Christmas (1978), Zum Ditter (1979), Reunion in Dunnville (1981), Waterworx (A Clear Day and No Memories) (1982), Landfall (1983), Beach Events (1984) and All That Is Solid (2003).

== Filmography ==
- Rose (1968)
- Cab 16 (1969)
- I, a Dog (1970)
- Tall Dark Stranger (1970)
- Next to Me (1971)
- Rooftops (1971)
- House Movie (1972)
- Wild Sync (1973)
- Home for Christmas (1978)
- This is the Title of My Film (1979)
- Zum Ditter (1979)
- Reunion in Dunnville (1981)
- Waterworx (A Clear Day and No Memories) (1982)
- Landfall (1983)
- Beach Events (1984)
- Moose Jaw: There's a Future in Our Past (1992)
