= Stepping Razor: Red X =

1992 Canadian documentary film

- Directed by: Nicholas Campbell
- Produced by: Edgar Egger
- Cinematography: Edgar Egger
- Edited by: Trevor Ambrose
- Production company: Bush Doctor Films
- Distributed by: Malofilm
- Release date: September 1992 (TIFF)
- Running time: 103 minutes
- Country: Canada
- Language: English

Stepping Razor: Red X is a Canadian documentary film, directed by Nicholas Campbell and released in 1992. The film is a portrait of reggae musician Peter Tosh, drawn both from Tosh's "Red X" series of autobiographical tapes that he was recording at the time of his murder and from interviews with other figures about Tosh's cultural impact.

The film premiered at the 1992 Festival of Festivals.

The film received a Genie Award nomination for Best Feature Length Documentary at the 14th Genie Awards. Peter Goddard of the Toronto Star called it "one of the best musical documentaries about any star, in any genre, ever."

On October 17, 2018, the film received a special screening at the TIFF Bell Lightbox to mark the official legalization of cannabis in Canada.
