= Kate Hennig =

Canadian actress and playwright

- Born: 1961 or 1962 (age 63–64); Harlow, Ontario, Canada
- Education: Royal Central School of Speech and Drama
- Occupations: Playwright and actress
- Spouse: Ian Prinsloo (divorced)
- Website: www.katehennig.com

Kate Hennig is a Canadian actress and playwright, currently the associate artistic director of the Shaw Festival.

== Early life and education ==
Hennig was born in Harlow, Ontario near London. Her father was a Lutheran minister. She and her family moved to Edmonton when Hennig was 7. Hennig attended York University briefly before dropping out.

In 2002, Hennig was awarded a master's degree from the Central School of Speech and Drama in London.

== Career ==
She was a shortlisted Dora Mavor Moore Award nominee for Best Actress in a Play (Large Theatre) in 2003 for The Danish Play, and won the Dora for Best Actress in a Musical in 2011 for Billy Elliot. Although predominantly a stage actress, she also received a Genie Award nomination for Best Supporting Actress in 1993 for her performance in Thirty Two Short Films About Glenn Gould, and has appeared in the films Mrs. Winterbourne and The Claim, and the television series Bomb Girls, Saving Hope and L.M. Montgomery's Anne of Green Gables.

As a playwright, she has written the plays The Last Wife, The Virgin Trial, and Mother's Daughter. She was nominated for Outstanding New Play at the 2017 Dora Mavor Moore Awards and shortlisted for the Governor General's Award for English-language drama at the 2017 Governor General's Awards for The Virgin Trial.

In 2019, Hennig directed Holiday Inn at the Shaw Festival.

== Personal life ==
Hennig married and later divorced Ian Prinsloo. She moved back Toronto from Calgary in 2001, after her run as Sally Bowles in Cabaret ended.

== Filmography ==
=== Film ===
Year	Title	Role	Notes
1993	Thirty Two Short Films About Glenn Gould	Chambermaid	
1996	Mrs. Winterbourne	Sophie	
2000	The Claim	Vauneen	

=== Television ===
Year	Title	Role	Notes
1988	The Taming of the Shrew	Widow	TV film
1989	The Comedy of Errors	Luce	TV film
1994	The Babymaker: The Dr. Cecil Jacobson Story	Nurse	TV film
1995	Heritage Minutes	Mrs. Chmiliar	Episode: "Myrnam Hospital"
1996	Lives of Girls & Women	Fern Doherty	TV film
1996	Losing Chase	Katherine	TV film
1996	Talk to Me	Stacy	TV film
1997	When Secrets Kill	Mary Martin	TV film
1998	Goosebumps	Crystal's Mom	Episodes: "Cry of the Cat: Parts 1 & 2"
1999	Murder in a Small Town	Mary	TV film
2000	A Taste of Shakespeare	Puck	Episode: "A Midsummer Night's Dream"
2003	Jasper, Texas	White Mother	TV film
2009	Flashpoint	Brenda	Episode: "Remote Control"
2012–2013	Bomb Girls	Adele Witham	Recurring role
2015	Saving Hope	Margot Kay	Episode: "All Down the Line"
2016	L.M. Montgomery's Anne of Green Gables	Rachel Lynde	TV film
2017	L.M. Montgomery's Anne of Green Gables: The Good Stars	Rachel Lynde	TV film
2017	L.M. Montgomery's Anne of Green Gables: Fire & Dew	Rachel Lynde	TV film

=== Theatre ===
Year	Title	Role(s)	Company/Theatre	Notes	Ref.
1988	Taming of the Shrew	Widow	Stratford Festival		
1991	Carousel	Mrs. Mullins	Stratford Festival		
1991	Hamlet	Player Queen	Stratford Festival		
1993	Ratbag		Stratford Festival	Dora Award-winning performance	
2001	Cabaret	Sally Bowles	Theatre Calgary		
2003	The Danish Play	Agnete Ottosen	Nightwood Theatre	Dora Award-winning performance	
2003	Last Romantics		Necessary Angel		
2003	The Good Life		Necessary Angel	Staged reading	
2007	The Penelopiad		National Arts Centre		
2007	White Christmas	Martha Watson	Sony Centre		
2008	Anyone Can Whistle				
2008	Blue Note		Nightswimming		
2009	Billy Elliot	Mrs. Wilkinson	Broadway		
2011	Billy Elliot	Mrs. Wilkinson	Mirvish Productions	Dora Award-winning performance	
2012	A Man and Some Women	Rose	Shaw Festival		
2013	Romeo and Juliet	Nurse	Stratford Festival		
2013	Fiddler on the Roof	Golde	Stratford Festival		
2014	A Lovely Sunday for Creve Coeur	Bodey	Shaw Festival		
2014	Rifles	Señora Carrar	Praxis/Next Stage		
2015	Little Death	Claire	Koffler Centre/Why Not Theatre/Riser Project		
2016	Breath of Kings	Mistress Quickly and Gower	Stratford Festival		
2016	Hedda Gabler	Julia			
2017	The Audience	Margaret Thatcher	Mirvish/Royal Manitoba Theatre Centre		
2019	A Doll's House, Part 2	Anne-Marie	Royal Manitoba Theatre Centre		
2022	The Importance of Being Ernest	Lady Bracknell	Shaw Festival		
2022	Gaslight (adapted from Angel Street)	Elizabeth	Shaw Festival		
2023	Gypsy	Momma Rose	Shaw Festival		

== Plays ==
- The Eleventh David
- More
- Waterworks, later titled Drowning Out of Water
- The Queenmaker Trilogy:
  - The Last Wife
  - The Virgin Trial
  - Mother’s Daughter
- Cyrano de Bergerac (translation and adaptation)
- Wilde Tales
