= Impolite (film) =

- Directed by: David Hauka
- Written by: Michael McKinley
- Produced by: Raymond Massey
- Starring: Robert Wisden; Suzy Joachim; Kevin McNulty; Christopher Plummer
- Cinematography: Robert McLachlan
- Edited by: Lara Mazur
- Music by: Braun Farnon; Robert Smart
- Production company: Well Mannered Films Inc.
- Distributed by: Vanguard Cinema
- Release date: September 16, 1992 (TIFF)
- Running time: 98 minutes
- Country: Canada
- Language: English

Impolite is a Canadian mystery film, directed by David Hauka and released in 1992. The film stars Robert Wisden as Jack Yeats, a burned-out journalist who is investigating the death of wealthy businessman Naples O'Rorke (Christopher Plummer).

The cast also includes Suzy Joachim, Kevin McNulty, Stuart Margolin, Jill Teed, Susan Hogan, Timothy Webber and Katherine Banwell.

The film premiered at the 1992 Toronto International Film Festival.

== Reception ==
The film received mixed reviews from critics. Rick Groen of The Globe and Mail called it more a work in progress than an accomplished film, writing that "At best, the references form an organic part of the plot, and give the deathly puzzle an epistemological kick ("Truth is a matter of opinion," someone mutters). At worst, they're a bit show-offy and sophomoric, like listening to a bunch of sherry-sippers in an undergraduate common room. The same highs and lows can be seen in McKinley's working out of the mystery itself - the resolution is opaque, with a lot of loose ends, some of which seem deliberate and provocatively murky, others of which seem accidental and confusingly shoddy." Katherine Monk of the Vancouver Sun wrote that "At times Impolite is so well-read, it can lose you in its quickness - like a Stoppard play that thrives on inside intelligentsia jokes. (Here, at least all the inside jokes are Canadian.) At other times, it can have you scratching your head in search of a linear through-line the way Lynch is apt to do, and other times, heck, it feels as down home as an episode of the Beachcombers."

Plummer received a Genie Award nomination for Best Supporting Actor at the 14th Genie Awards in 1993.
