= The Twist (1992 film) =

- Directed by: Ron Mann
- Written by: Ron Mann
- Produced by: Don Haig; Ron Mann
- Cinematography: Robert Fresco
- Edited by: Robert Kennedy
- Music by: Keith Elliott; Nicholas Stirling
- Production company: Alliance Entertainment
- Distributed by: Films We Like
- Release date: September 19, 1992 (TIFF)
- Running time: 74 minutes
- Country: Canada

The Twist is a 1992 Canadian documentary film, directed by Ron Mann.

== Summary ==
The film is a history of the twist dance craze of the early 1960s, exploring the creative, social and political contexts in which it was created and embraced by the public.

== Release and reception ==
The film premiered at the 1992 Festival of Festivals, as the closing night gala.

The film was a Genie Award nominee for Best Feature Length Documentary at the 14th Genie Awards in 1993.
