= American Boyfriends =

- Theatrical release poster
- Directed by: Sandy Wilson
- Written by: Sandy Wilson
- Produced by: Sandy Wilson; Steven DeNure
- Starring: Margaret Langrick; John Wildman; Jason Blicker; Liisa Repo-Martell; Delia Breit
- Cinematography: Brenton Spencer
- Edited by: Lara Mazur
- Music by: Terry Frewer; Paul Hyde
- Production company: Alliance Entertainment
- Distributed by: CBS Films
- Release date: September 11, 1989
- Running time: 90 minutes
- Country: Canada
- Language: English
- Budget: Can$3 million

American Boyfriends is a 1989 Canadian comedy-drama film written and directed by Sandy Wilson and starring Margaret Langrick, John Wildman, Jason Blicker, Liisa Repo-Martell, and Delia Breit. It is the sequel to My American Cousin (1985). Langrick and Wildman reprise their roles as Sandy Wilcox and Butch Walker respectively.

The soundtrack for this film contains songs by a number of popular Canadian music groups of the era including Barney Bentall and the Legendary Hearts, Colin James, Sass Jordan, Spirit of the West, and BTO. The soundtrack was released on CD by Penta Records.

== Awards ==
The film was nominated for "Best Original Song" ("Restless Dreamer" by Barney Bentall and the Legendary Hearts) and "Best Sound Editing" (as was the first film) at the 11th Genie Awards.

The single "Wooly Bully" (BTO) reached #80 on the Canadian charts.

"Back in My Arms Again" (Colin James) also reached #80 on the Canadian charts.
