= The Fairy Who Didn't Want to Be a Fairy Anymore =

- Film poster
- Directed by: Laurie Lynd
- Written by: Daniel MacIvor
- Produced by: Karen Lee Hall
- Starring: Daniel MacIvor; Holly Cole; Micah Barnes; John Turner; Michael Kennard
- Cinematography: Miroslaw Baszak
- Edited by: Miume Jan
- Music by: John Alcorn
- Release date: 1992 (TIFF)
- Running time: 16 minutes
- Country: Canada
- Language: English

The Fairy Who Didn't Want to Be a Fairy Anymore is a Canadian musical comedy-drama short film directed by Laurie Lynd, which premiered at the 1992 Toronto International Film Festival before going into wider release in 1993. Made as an academic project while Lynd was studying at the Canadian Film Centre, it won the Genie Award for Best Live Action Short Drama at the 14th Genie Awards.

== Plot ==
An allegory for gender stereotypes and internalized homophobia, the film stars Daniel MacIvor as a fairy who approaches a surgical team (Holly Cole as the doctor and Micah Barnes as the nurse) to have his wings removed so that he can become a normal human being, after facing anti-fairy discrimination. Following a musical debate between the three, the doctor agrees to perform the surgery. As he leaves the clinic, the now-wingless fairy is initially happy to be just like everyone else around him, but soon comes to regret his decision as he belatedly realizes the unique qualities and gifts, such as the ability to fly, that he has given up by pushing his identity into the closet.

== Production ==
Michael Kennard and John Turner, in character as the clown duo Mump and Smoot, also appear in the film, depicted as reading the story in the form of a book that they have found on the sidewalk. MacIvor also wrote the film's screenplay.

== Release and reception ==
In addition to its Genie Award win, the film received an honorable mention from the Best Canadian Short Film jury at TIFF, and won the award for Best Short Film at the Seattle International Film Festival in 1993.

Several years after its original release, the film received a follow-up screening at the 1998 Toronto International Film Festival as part of a special program commemorating the 10th anniversary of the Canadian Film Centre. In 2007, Toronto's Inside Out Film and Video Festival screened both The Fairy and Lynd's earlier film RSVP, along with an excerpt from his highly anticipated but not yet completed feature film Breakfast with Scot.
