= Peggy Thompson (screenwriter) =

Canadian screenwriter, producer, playwright, and professor (born 1952)

- Born: 1952 (age 73–74)
- Citizenship: Canadian
- Occupations: Screenwriter and professor
- Writing career
- Notable works: In Search of the Last Good Man; The Lotus Eaters; Better Than Chocolate; Da Vinci's Inquest; Big Sound
- Website: www.peggythompson.ca

Peggy Thompson is a Canadian screenwriter, producer, playwright, and professor. She is known for her films The Lotus Eaters and Better Than Chocolate.

== Career ==
Thompson's 1989 short film In Search of the Last Good Man won the Genie Award for Best Live Action Short Drama at the 11th Genie Awards in 1990. She won the award for Best Screenplay at the 14th Genie Awards in 1993 for The Lotus Eaters.

Thompson wrote the screenplay and co-produced the 2000 film, Better Than Chocolate. She began conceiving the film in 1993, shortly after finishing The Lotus Eaters, while on a retreat with Better Than Chocolate's other producer, Sharon McGowan.The two dared each other to create a lesbian coming out comedy. Thompson was committed to not having Better Than Chocolate be in "the tradition of the celluloid closet" and thus gave the lesbian characters in the film a happy ending.

Her other credits include the films Saint Monica and Bearded Ladies: The Photography of Rosamond Norbury, the television series The Beachcombers, Da Vinci's Inquest and Big Sound, and stage plays including Brides in Space and The Last Will and Testament of Lolita. She was also coauthor, with Saeko Usukawa, of two coffee table books on film history, Hard Boiled: Great Lines from Film Noir and Tall in the Saddle: Great Lines from Classic Westerns.

Thompson is currently an associate professor of screenwriting at the University of British Columbia.

== Personal life ==
Saeko Usukawa, an art book writer and editor with Douglas & McIntyre, was Thompson's partner from 1978 until her death in 2009.
