= Charlene Fernetz =

Canadian former actress

- Born: March 23, 1960 (age 66); Saskatchewan, Canada
- Occupation: Actress
- Years active: 1991–2008
- Spouse: Peter Mora
- Parent(s): Ken and Carmelita Fernetz
- Awards: Best Actress; 2005 Seeking Fear

Charlene Fernetz (born March 23, 1960) is a Canadian former actress. She is known for her role as Malloy on Street Justice (1991–1993).

== Life and career ==
Fernetz was born on a large farm in the middle of Saskatchewan, Canada and studied journalism at the British Columbia Institute of Technology. In 1990 it was while doing regional theater in Portland, Oregon, that she caught the eye of a Manager from Los Angeles, and within months she was a guest on the Showtime series, Kurt Vonnegut's Monkey House.

== Filmography ==
Year	Title	Role	Notes
1991–1993	Street Justice	Malloy	44 episodes
1992	Mann & Machine	Yvonne Stepka	1 episode
1992	The Hat Squad	1 episode	
1993	Harmony Cats	Jane Pitkeithly	
1993	Woman on the Ledge	Carol	TV movie
1993	Made in America	Paula	
1994	The Mighty Jungle	Susan Winfield	
1994	Heads	Betty Jo	
1994	Paris or Somewhere	Gwen	
1995	Hawkeye	Hester	
1995	Kung Fu: The Legend Continues		
1996	Sabrina the Teenage Witch	Aunt Zelda	TV movie
1997	Two	Jill O'Hara	1 episode
1997	The Outer Limits	Corinne Virgil	1 episode
1997	Alibi	Laura Hill	TV movie
1997	Sabrina, the Teenage Witch	Gail Kippling	1 episode
1997	Diagnosis Murder	Susan Huckaby	
2000	Beyond Belief: Fact or Fiction	Mrs. Baker	
2000	Ricky 6	Ann Cowen	
2001	Just Ask My Children	Reporter Terry	TV movie
2005	Murder on the Yellow Brick Road	Rachel Dowd	
2005	Seeking Fear	Trudy McCormick	
2008	Keyeye the Movie	Rachel Burk	
