= Maxime Collin =

Canadian actor

- Born: 6 December 1979 (age 46)
- Occupation: Actor
- Years active: 1990–1997

Maxime Collin (born December 6, 1979) is a Canadian actor and business owner best known for playing the title character in the 1992 film Léolo and Benoit in Matusalem (1993).

Collin was 11 when he was cast for Léolo. He had many roles over the next few years and decided to take less work by age 17, after which he described himself as forgotten. After taking insurance broker training, he went into business as the owner of a car cleaning store.
