= Donald Winkler =

Canadian documentary filmmaker and literary translator (born 1940)

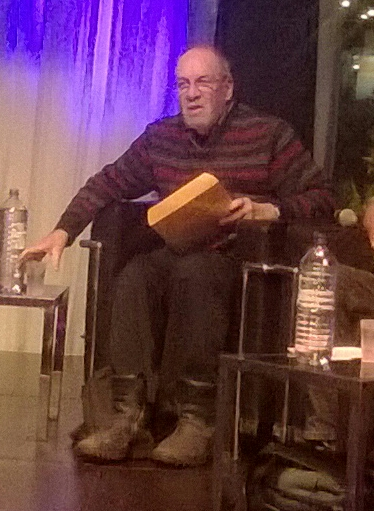
- Donald Winkler in 2018
- Born: Donald Winkler; 1940 (age 85–86); Winnipeg, Manitoba, Canada
- Education: University of Manitoba; Yale School of Drama
- Occupations: Filmmaker, Translator
- Spouse: Sheila Fischman
- Awards: Governor General's Award
- Website: www.donaldwinkler.com

Donald Winkler (born 1940) is a Canadian documentary filmmaker and French-to-English literary translator. He lives in Montreal with his wife Sheila Fischman.

== Life and career ==
=== Early life ===
Winkler was born in Winnipeg, Manitoba and grew up loving theatre. He was introduced to French through his mother who studied the language in Romania before coming to Canada when she was fifteen years old. As a student, he took French courses alongside his literary studies at the University of Manitoba where he graduated in 1961. He also went on to do graduate studies at the Yale School of Drama. In his early twenties, he spent a year and a half in Paris teaching English where he enjoyed watching films at the Cinématheque and the little Latin Quarter art houses. When he returned to Canada, he was drawn to Montreal because, for him, it was "the only city in the country at that time cosmopolitan enough". The city was also the headquarters for the National Film Board of Canada, where Winkler first began making films. He applied for an apprenticeship position that did not require film experience and was hired in 1967 when one of the three initial applicants declined the offer. He learned the trade on the job and within a couple of years, began working on his first film.

=== Film career ===
Winkler has been an independent filmmaker since leaving the National Film Board where he worked as a documentary film director and writer from 1967 to 1995. His films primarily deal with the arts and culture in Canada. He wrote and directed a number of films that look into the lives of Canadian playwrights, writers and musicians such as Irving Layton, F. R. Scott, P. K. Page, Al Purdy, Earle Birney, Ralph Gustafson and Tomson Highway. In the year 2005, he entered his three films: Moshe Safdie: The Power of Architecture, The Pines of Emily Carr and The Colour of Memory: Conversations with Guido Molinari into the International Festival of Films on Art in Montreal.

In 1993, his documentary film Breaking a Leg: Robert Lepage and the Echo Project was a Genie Award nominee for Best Short Documentary at the 14th Genie Awards.

=== Translation ===
Winkler first began translating Quebec literature in the late 1980s. Although he never studied translation, he has since translated over 25 works including novels, poetry and essays. He is a member of the Literary Translators' Association of Canada. Carmine Starnino describes Winkler as "one of [Canada's] most gifted and highly decorated practitioners." Winkler describes the process of translation as "a constant quest for perfect pitch" and a "sophisticated word game". A successful translation, in his words, gives readers "some sense of what it's like to be in another culture's skin". His translations have been described as "seamless" and "wonderful". Sheila Fischman, his spouse, is also an award-winning translator. He describes her as the "doyenne of Canadian literary translation".

==== Awards and nominations ====
Donald Winker has won the Governor General's Award for Translation three times:

- in 1994, for The Lyric Generation: The Life and Times of the Baby-Boomers by François Ricard,
- in 2011, for Partitia for Glenn Gould by Georges Leroux,
- and in 2013, for The Major Verbs by Pierre Nepveu.

His work was also nominated for the Governor General's Award on three separate occasions.

Donald Winkler was nominated for the Giller Prize twice:

- in 2007, for A Secret Between Us by Daniel Poliquin,
- and in 2015, for Arvida by Samuel Archibald

In addition, he won the Quebec Writers' Federation's Cole Foundation Translation Prize for his translation of The Major Verbs by Pierre Nepveu, and in 1987, he received an honorable mention at the Literary Translators' Association of Canada's John Glassco Prize for Literary Translation for his translation entitled Rose and Thorn: The Selected Poetry by Roland Giguère. Winkler's translation of Arvida by Samuel Archibald was also short-listed for the 2016 Best Translated Book Awards.

==== List of Translations ====
Title	Author	Year
And God Created the French	Louis-Bernard Robitaille	1997
Are You Married to a Psychopath?	Nadine Bismuth	2010
Arvida	Samuel Archibald	2015
A Secret Between Us	Daniel Poliquin	2007
Conversations with Jean-Paul Riopelle	Gilbert Erouart and Jean-Paul Riopelle	1995
Crac	Paul Savoie	2016
Eucalyptus	Mauricio Segura	2013
Exile	Gilles Vigneault	2010
Forty-Seven Stations for a Ravaged Town	Jacques Rancourt	2015
In the Name of the Father	Daniel Poliquin	2001
Jeanniot: Taking Aviation to New Heights	Jacqueline Cardinal and Laurent Lapierre	2013
Latest News from the Cosmos	Hubert Reeves	1997
Malicorne	Hubert Reeves	1993
Montcalm & Wolfe: Two Men Who Forever Changed the Course of Canadian History	Roch Carrier	2014
Of Jesuits and Bohemians	Jean-Claude Germain	2014
Partitia for Glenn Gould	Georges Leroux	2010
Pluriel: An Anthology of Diverse Voices	Various authors	2008
Romans Fleuves	Pierre Nepveu	1998
Rose and Thorn: The Selected Poetry by Roland Giguère	Roland Giguère	1988
Rue Fabre: Centre of the Universe	Jean-Claude Germain	2012
Terracide	Hubert Reeves	2009
The Bad Mother	Marguerite Andersen	2016
The Lyric Generation: The Life and Times of the Baby-Boomers	François Ricard	1994
The Major Verbs	Pierre Nepveu	2012
The Storm	Léon Courville	1995
The Universe Explained to my Grandchildren	Hubert Reeves	2012
The World of the Gift	Jacques T. Godbout	1998
To the Spring, by Night	Seyhmus Dagtekin	2013
You Will Love What You Have Killed	Kevin Lambert	2020
