= Micah Barnes =

Canadian pop singer-songwriter

- Born: Vienna, Austria
- Origin: Canada
- Genres: Pop
- Occupations: Singer, songwriter
- Years active: 1980–present
- Website: www.micahbarnes.com

Micah Barnes is a Canadian singer and songwriter. He has performed both as a solo artist and with the band the Nylons.

Born in Vienna, Barnes is the son of composer, conductor and jazz drummer Milton Barnes, and author, television and CBC Radio writer Lilly Barnes (who wrote for the television show Mr. Dressup). He is the brother of drummer Daniel Barnes and cellist Ariel Barnes. He attended Oakwood Collegiate Institute in Toronto, and then studied voice with José Hernandez and Bill Vincent, and sang in Toronto cabarets and nightclubs during the 1980s while appearing in theatre, film, television and radio productions as an actor. He was subsequently a member of the Nylons from 1990 to 1996, and later moved to Los Angeles.

In 2003, he collaborated with the house music duo Thunderpuss on the hit dance track "Welcome to My Head", which reached number one on the Billboard club charts.

He has also had some roles in film and television, including guest acting roles in the television series Katts and Dog and E.N.G. and a supporting role in the short film The Fairy Who Didn't Want to Be a Fairy Anymore, and as a vocal coach in the Canadian edition of How Do You Solve a Problem Like Maria?.

In 2019, Barnes and Thom Allison collaborated on Knishes 'n Grits, a stage show in which they explored the links between Jewish music and African-American music.
