= Blue (1992 film) =

1992 Canadian short film directed by Don McKellar

- Directed by: Don McKellar
- Written by: Don McKellar
- Produced by: Bruce McDonald
- Starring: David Cronenberg; Tracy Wright; Brad Armstrong; Elizabeth Zorn
- Cinematography: Miroslaw Baszak
- Edited by: Michael Pacek
- Production company: Canadian Film Centre
- Release date: September 11, 1992 (TIFF)
- Running time: 22 minutes
- Country: Canada
- Language: English

Blue is a Canadian short drama film, written and directed by Don McKellar and released in 1992. An exploration of culture's ambivalent relationship with pornography, the film stars David Cronenberg as a carpet salesman with a passion for erotic literature, intercut with scenes of explicit sexuality.

The cast also includes Tracy Wright, Brad Armstrong and Elizabeth Zorn.

The film premiered in the Canadian Perspective program at the 1992 Toronto International Film Festival, where it received an honorable mention from the Best Canadian Short Film award jury.
