= Léolo =

1992 film by Jean-Claude Lauzon

- Directed by: Jean-Claude Lauzon
- Written by: Jean-Claude Lauzon
- Produced by: Aimée Danis; Lyse Lafontaine
- Starring: Gilbert Sicotte; Maxime Collin; Ginette Reno; Giuditta del Vecchio; Julien Guiomar
- Distributed by: Alliance Communications Corporation
- Release date: May 17, 1992
- Running time: 107 minutes
- Country: Canada
- Language: French
- Budget: $5 million

Léolo is a 1992 Canadian coming-of-age fantasy comedy-drama written and directed by Jean-Claude Lauzon. The film tells the story of a young boy named Léo "Léolo" Lauzon, played by Maxime Collin, who engages in an active fantasy life while growing up with his Montreal family, and begins to have sexual fantasies about his neighbour Bianca, played by Giuditta del Vecchio. The film also stars Ginette Reno, Pierre Bourgault, Andrée Lachapelle, Denys Arcand, Julien Guiomar, and Germain Houde. Gilbert Sicotte narrates the film as the adult Léolo.

With a story developed by Lauzon as a semi-autobiographical work, the project was supported by producer Lyse Lafontaine as a co-production with France. Filming took place in Montreal and Sicily in 1991. It was Lauzon's second and final film, as he died in a plane crash in 1997 while working on his next project.

Initially released in the 1992 Cannes Film Festival, Léolo won three Genie Awards, including Best Original Screenplay for Lauzon, losing Best Motion Picture to Naked Lunch. It later benefited from a resurgence of interest, leading to critics and filmmakers adding it to the Top 10 Canadian Films of All Time in 2015. The film also influenced the naming of the movie review aggregator website Rotten Tomatoes, when site co-creator Senh Duong decided upon the site name while viewing the film.

The film was selected as the Canadian entry for the Best Foreign Language Film at the 65th Academy Awards, but was not accepted as a nominee.

== Plot ==
In Mile End, Montreal, Léo Lauzon is a young boy living in a tenement with his dysfunctional family, serving as the unreliable narrator. He uses his active fantasy life and the book L'avalée des avalés by Québécois novelist Réjean Ducharme to escape the reality of his life. He feels his father is insane and denies being his son. After having a dream revealing his mother was impregnated after falling into a cart of tomatoes contaminated by an Italian man's semen, Léo identifies as Italian rather than French Canadian and adopts the name Léolo Lozone.

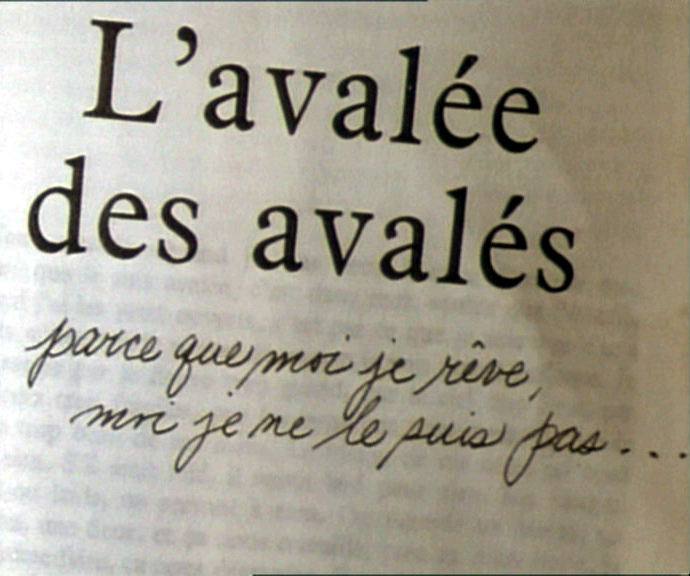
Léolo reads L'avalée des avalés by Réjean Ducharme.

Growing up in an apartment with a rat in the bathtub, a turkey and a family obsessed with regular bowel movements, Léolo continues to write. His writings are discovered by the Word Tamer, a reincarnation of Don Quixote, who searches through trash for letters and photographs. Léolo observes a neighbouring young woman named Bianca and imagines her singing to him from a closet, emitting a white light. His grandfather, who Léolo believes attempted to murder him by holding him under a pool, helps her financially and extorts her for sexual favours, revealing her breasts and putting his feet in her mouth. Léolo begins to fantasize about Bianca sexually and discovers masturbation. Meanwhile, his brother Fernand, after being beaten by a bully and having failed a special education class, builds up muscles. Word Tamer, continuously monitoring Léolo's thoughts, reads the boy's hopes about how Fernand's muscles will make them invincible. However, upon being confronted by the bully for the second time, Fernand is overwhelmed with fear and is beaten again while Léolo watches in shock.

Finally convinced his grandfather is responsible for all of the family's troubles, Léolo attempts to lower a noose and hang his grandfather while he is in the bath. His grandfather sees Léolo doing it and is choked, before finally being freed, with Léolo injured in the process. Léolo subsequently goes to the hospital, where he is told his actions could constitute attempted murder, though he is not charged. Reacting with horror to the ways other boys are pursuing sex, he seeks out the services of a prostitute named Regina. Upon later becoming ill, he ends up in the same institution where many other members of his family have been treated.

== Cast ==
- Gilbert Sicotte – Narrator (voice)
- Maxime Collin – Leolo
- Ginette Reno – Mother
- Julien Guiomar – Grandfather
- Pierre Bourgault – Word Tamer
- Giuditta Del Vecchio – Bianca
- Andrée Lachapelle – Psychiatrist
- Denys Arcand – Councillor
- Germain Houde – Teacher
- Yves Montmarquette – Fernand
- Lorne Brass – Fernand's Enemy
- Roland Blouin – Father
- Geneviève Samson – Rita
- Marie-Hélène Montpetit – Nanette
- Francis St-Onge – Leolo, age 6

== Themes and interpretations ==
New York remarked on the classical allusions in the story:

Léolo dreams of Sicily, of sunlight and Greek ruins, and of a slender Italian girl, Bianca, a neighbor, whom he imagines standing on a hill in Taormina singing to him. Léolo is meant to be a modern Dante sitting in one of the dark circles of his hell, and Bianca is his Beatrice.

The story is also related with a "dreamlike environment", with "choral music" that evokes "the possibility of spiritual transcendence". Part of the way the narrative shifts from natural to fantasy elements is through the Word Tamer character, who becomes "an omniscient god-like observer". Author Bill Marshall assessed the Word Tamer as one of the benign elders, as opposed to the bad ones, and hypothesized that the Word Tamer's abode, Federico Fellini's Cinecittà property, symbolizes the film's "exaggerated, grotesque realism".

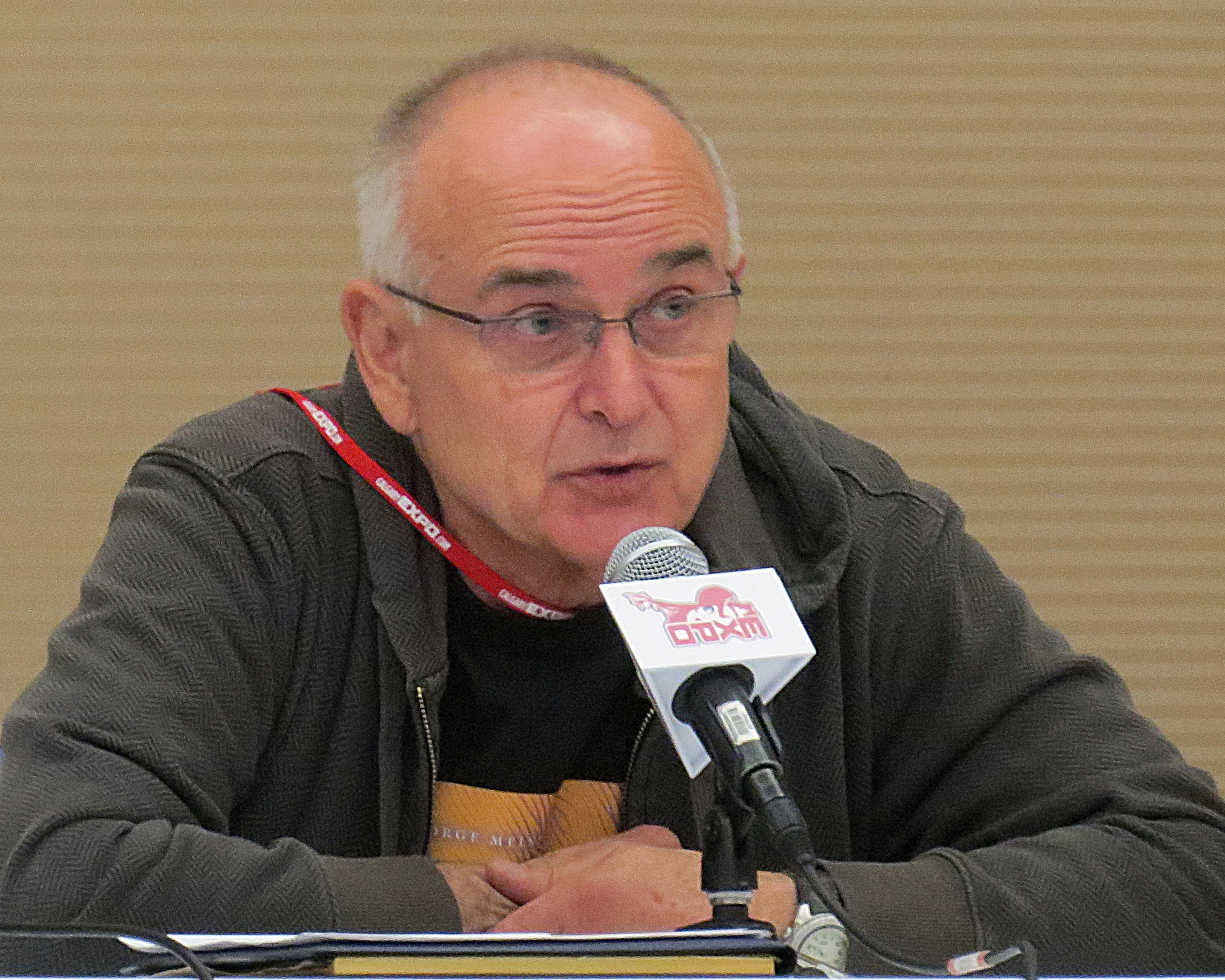
Canadian historian George Melnyk discussed the film's possible statements on Quebec's "national identity crisis".

Some Canadian analysis of Léolo has related to possible political symbolism and Quebec's national identity. In 1992 at the Toronto International Film Festival, programming director Piers Handling called the film an "epitaph for Quebec", in which the title character rejects his Quebecois identity and joins another world by fantasy. Canadian historian George Melnyk remarked that Pierre Bourgault is a prominent Quebec separatist, but is not allowed to say much in the film, which also features the muscular Fernand intimidated by a smaller English Canadian, and non-Quebecois music, concluding the film represented a "national identity crisis". Among the cosmopolitan music uses is Tibetan-style chanting, and songs by The Rolling Stones and Tom Waits. Film scholar Jim Leach wrote that in real life, Lauzon would call himself a Canadian director, despite contemporary belief Quebec cinema was distinct. In the narration, the setting "Mile End, Montreal, Canada" does not mention Quebec, and Léolo's supposed Italian father refers to the tomatoes as destined for "America" rather than Quebec, though they are sold in Montreal. It is also thought the film is set in the late 1950s, in the "old Quebec" before the Quiet Revolution.

However, Lauzon denied the film had any political meaning, saying he was not an intellectual, and his film "does not have the flag draped all over it". He also said he had an admiration for the Italian people. Leach questioned if the film is set before the Quiet Revolution, saying if Léolo was born in the 1950s, the 12-year-old character lived in 1965, and Ducharme's book seen in the film was published in 1967. Marshall noted the Ducharme novel would place the story in the 1960s, but argued "otherwise the feel is 1950s".

== Production ==
=== Development ===
Director Jean-Claude Lauzon wrote the screenplay, starting it in Sicily while shooting his first film Night Zoo. It served in part as an autobiography, with Lauzon stating he wrote it "almost in a state of trance" and was initially unsure how the storyline would develop or end. Before completing high school and going on to study film in university, Lauzon stated he had lived on "the criminal fringes" of Montreal streets, and his dark perspective is found in Léolo. André Petrowski, a friend of Lauzon, also claimed the film depicted the "gross pathology" of the Lauzon family in a "very, very personal way".

Although Lauzon had offers to shoot Hollywood action films after Night Zoo (1987), he instead presented the Léolo script to producer Lyse Lafontaine. Lafontaine stated the screenplay had been rejected by other producers and was difficult to read, but she found it "magic" and produced it with Aimée Danis. The film had a $5 million budget.

=== Casting ===
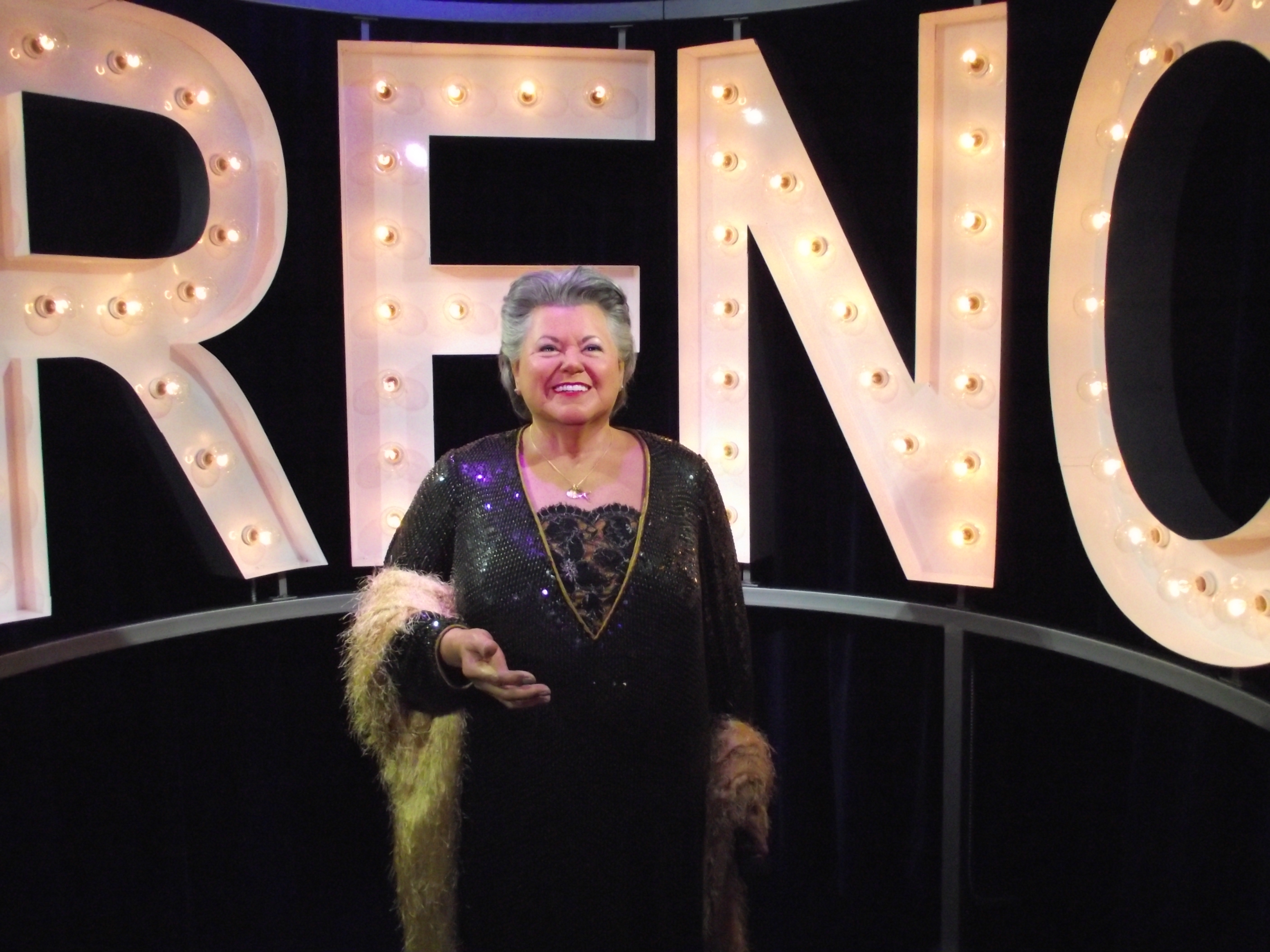
Ginette Reno, commemorated by wax sculpture at Musée Grévin Montreal, played the mother after initially rejecting the part for the dark subject matter.

Singer Ginette Reno was cast as the mother after initially rejecting the role, finding the subject matter was "too violent and rough". She was persuaded to star in the film, believing it might win her new fans, even if others were shocked by it. For the title role, Maxime Collin was cast at age 11.

For the part of the Word Tamer, who reads Léolo's writings, Lauzon cast his mentor, university professor Pierre Bourgault. Although in reality Bourgault is a strong proponent of the Quebec sovereignty movement, Lauzon denied he was cast for political reasons. A bodybuilder, Yves Montmarquette, portrayed Fernand for the scenes after the character builds up his muscles.

Lafontaine's son Mikaël had a small part as a swimmer. The film's French producers asked Lauzon to use actor Pierre Richard in the film, which he did not.

=== Filming ===
The film was shot over 58 days beginning in the fall of 1991, originally in Montreal. In one scene, Léolo is seen sitting in front of a house, which was where Jean-Claude Lauzon was born. Reno spent three months filming Léolo over the fall of 1991. A second stage of filming took place briefly in Sicily.

Lafontaine found shooting the film difficult because of Lauzon's emotional swings, although Reno found him affectionate. Lauzon asserted those who found him too temperamental to work with did not know him well, and he had a history of good relations with film departments. When Lafontaine traveled to Italy with Lauzon, he gave her a letter thanking her for her ineptitude in business, which he considered necessary to make a film with feeling. She kept it as a cherished keepsake.

In one scene, a boy commits an act of bestiality with a tied-down cat. Lauzon initially intended to use a puppet for the cat in a rehearsal, but the actor objected that it would be ridiculous, insisting on a real cat.

== Release ==
The film was entered into the Cannes Film Festival and screened on 17 May 1992, where it received a standing ovation. At Cannes, Lauzon supposedly told juror Jamie Lee Curtis he wanted to have sex with her, which Los Angeles Times writer Kenneth Turan believed compromised the film's prospects of winning the Palme d'Or. It was screened at the 1992 Toronto International Film Festival and the New York Film Festival in September 1992, distributed by Fine Line Features. The film opened in Quebec in June, and in the U.S. in February 1993. It had a release in 70 countries in total.

After Lauzon was killed in the northern Quebec plane crash in 1997, CBC Television, Télé-Québec and Showcase aired Night Zoo and Léolo in August, and Serge Losique announced an outdoor screening for Léolo at the Montreal World Film Festival in September. In 2014, Léolo was selected for a 2K digital restoration for a screening in the Cannes Classics selection of the 2014 Cannes Film Festival. The restoration was carried out by the Elephant project and Cinémathèque québécoise, and it was the first Canadian film screened for Cannes Classics.

== Reception ==
=== Box office ===
After opening at Place des Arts in Montreal on June 4, 1992, the film made $100,000 after its first week. The film had a total of 110,000 admissions in Quebec theatres. In its first weekend in two New York theatres, it made $31,009, which was considered a successful launch.

According to Box Office Mojo, the film finished its run grossing $611,703 domestically. It was the highest-grossing film in Canada for 1992. It was one of the highest-grossing films worldwide for distributor Alliance Films. It did particularly well in Germany and Spain, while it did not perform well in the U.S.

=== Critical response ===
Léolo has an approval rating of 90% on review aggregator website Rotten Tomatoes, based on 10 reviews, and an average rating of 8.3/10.

Canadian critic Brian D. Johnson, writing for Maclean's, said the film "elevates Canadian cinema to new heights of creative ambition and achievement". Roger Ebert gave the film four stars, writing "Léolo is an enchanting, disgusting, romantic, depressing, hilarious, tragic movie, and it is quite original- one of the year's best. I have never seen one like it before". Janet Maslin of The New York Times called Léolo "daring, bracingly original" and initially "whimsical". Kenneth Turan of The Los Angeles Times praised it as "extraordinary". Peter Brunette of The New York Times wrote "It's a bizarre, occasionally upsetting film, but its underlying portrait-of-the-artist-as-a-young-man theme couldn't be more classic". David Denby of New York magazine panned the film as "the most maladroit film I've seen in ages".

In 2005, Time magazine named Léolo one of Time's All-TIME 100 Movies. That year, Ebert added it to his Great Movies list, writing on "the deep amusement and even love that Lauzon conveys in his material". Ebert also said "The technical brilliance of the film is astonishing". In 2014, Peter Howell of The Toronto Star, writing on Léolo's screening in Cannes Classics, called the film "masterful", while Bruce Kirkland of The Toronto Sun called it "brilliantly deranged" and speculated Lauzon would have enjoyed seeing the film's revival. Also in 2014, Turan included Léolo in his book, Not to Be Missed: Fifty-Four Favorites From a Lifetime of Film, citing it as an example of one of the films among the 54 with "a more limited following". The next year, the Toronto International Film Festival placed it fifth in the Top 10 Canadian Films of All Time, regarded as a "noteworthy" change in the overall Top 10, which had been compiled once per decade since 1984. The Cannes restoration likely led to the resurgence of interest in the film, resulting in the Top 10 addition.

In 2001, an industry poll conducted by Playback named it the 12th best Canadian film of the preceding 15 years.

=== Accolades ===
The film was selected as the Canadian entry for the Best Foreign Language Film at the 65th Academy Awards, but was not accepted as a nominee. The film was selected for competition for the Palme d'Or at Cannes, and its loss caused critics to accuse the jury of conservative choices.

At the 13th Genie Awards, Léolo received nine nominations and was perceived as being in an unusually tight competition with David Cronenberg's Naked Lunch. Naked Lunch was considered to have triumphed over Leolo on awards night.

Award	Date of ceremony	Category	Recipient(s)	Result	Ref(s)
Genie Awards	22 November 1992	Best Motion Picture	Aimée Danis and Lyse Lafontaine	Nominated	
Genie Awards	22 November 1992	Best Direction	Jean-Claude Lauzon	Nominated	
Genie Awards	22 November 1992	Best Original Screenplay	Jean-Claude Lauzon	Won	
Genie Awards	22 November 1992	Best Art Direction	François Séguin	Nominated	
Genie Awards	22 November 1992	Best Cinematography	Guy Dufaux	Nominated	
Genie Awards	22 November 1992	Best Costume Design	François Barbeau	Won	
Genie Awards	22 November 1992	Best Editing	Michel Arcand	Won	
Genie Awards	22 November 1992	Best Sound	Yvon Benoît, Jo Caron, Jack Jullian and Hans Peter Strobl	Nominated	
Genie Awards	22 November 1992	Best Sound Editing	Marcel Pothier, Jean-Pierre Lelong, Richard Grégoire, Mathieu Beaudin, Carole Gagnon and Jacques Plante	Nominated	
Toronto International Film Festival	10 – 19 September 1992	Best Canadian Feature Film Special Jury Citation	Jean-Claude Lauzon	Won	
Valladolid International Film Festival	October 1992	Golden Spike	Jean-Claude Lauzon	Won	
Vancouver International Film Festival	1992	Best Canadian Screenplay	Jean-Claude Lauzon	Won	

== See also ==
- List of submissions to the 65th Academy Awards for Best Foreign Language Film
- List of Canadian submissions for the Academy Award for Best Foreign Language Film
