= Moose Jaw: There's a Future in Our Past =

1992 Canadian short film directed by Rick Hancox

- Directed by: Rick Hancox
- Written by: Rick Hancox
- Produced by: Rick Hancox
- Cinematography: Chris Gallagher; Rick Hancox; Geoffrey Yates
- Edited by: Rick Hancox
- Production company: Rick Hancox Productions
- Release date: September 1992 (TIFF)
- Running time: 57 minutes
- Country: Canada
- Language: English

Moose Jaw: There's a Future in Our Past is a Canadian mid-length documentary film, written and directed by Rick Hancox and released in 1992.

A personal essay film, it details his reflections on his childhood in Moose Jaw, Saskatchewan, and the ways that the changing Canadian economy of the 1980s and early 1990s had greatly damaged the city by the time he returned for a visit in adulthood, including his own childhood house having been abandoned and boarded up, the city's train station having been closed due to the decline of rail travel, and the city having "museumified" itself by erecting the Mac the Moose statue as a tourist attraction.

The film premiered in the Canadian Perspective program at the 1992 Toronto International Film Festival, where it received an honorable mention from the Best Canadian Short Film award jury.
