= The Measure of Your Passage =

1992 Canadian documentary film

- French: Le singe bleu
- Directed by: Esther Valiquette
- Written by: Esther Valiquette
- Produced by: Esther Valiquette; Jacques Vallée
- Narrated by: Esther Valiquette (French); Lynne Adams (English)
- Cinematography: Martin Leclerc
- Edited by: René Roberge
- Music by: Ginette Bellavance; Daniel Toussaint
- Production company: National Film Board of Canada
- Release date: 1992
- Running time: 30 minutes
- Country: Canada
- Language: French

The Measure of Your Passage (French: Le singe bleu) is a Canadian documentary film, directed by Esther Valiquette and released in 1992. Inspired by her own diagnosis with HIV/AIDS a few years earlier, the essay film presents her thoughts on the meaning of life, and the traces we leave behind after death, through the prism of the collapse of ancient Minoan civilization.

Valiquette narrated the French version of the film herself, while the English version was narrated by actress Lynne Adams.

The film won the award for Best Short Film at the 1993 Rendez-vous Québec Cinéma, and the Genie Award for Best Short Documentary at the 14th Genie Awards in 1993.

Valiquette died of AIDS on September 8, 1994.
