= Nicholas Campbell =

Canadian actor and filmmaker (born 1952)

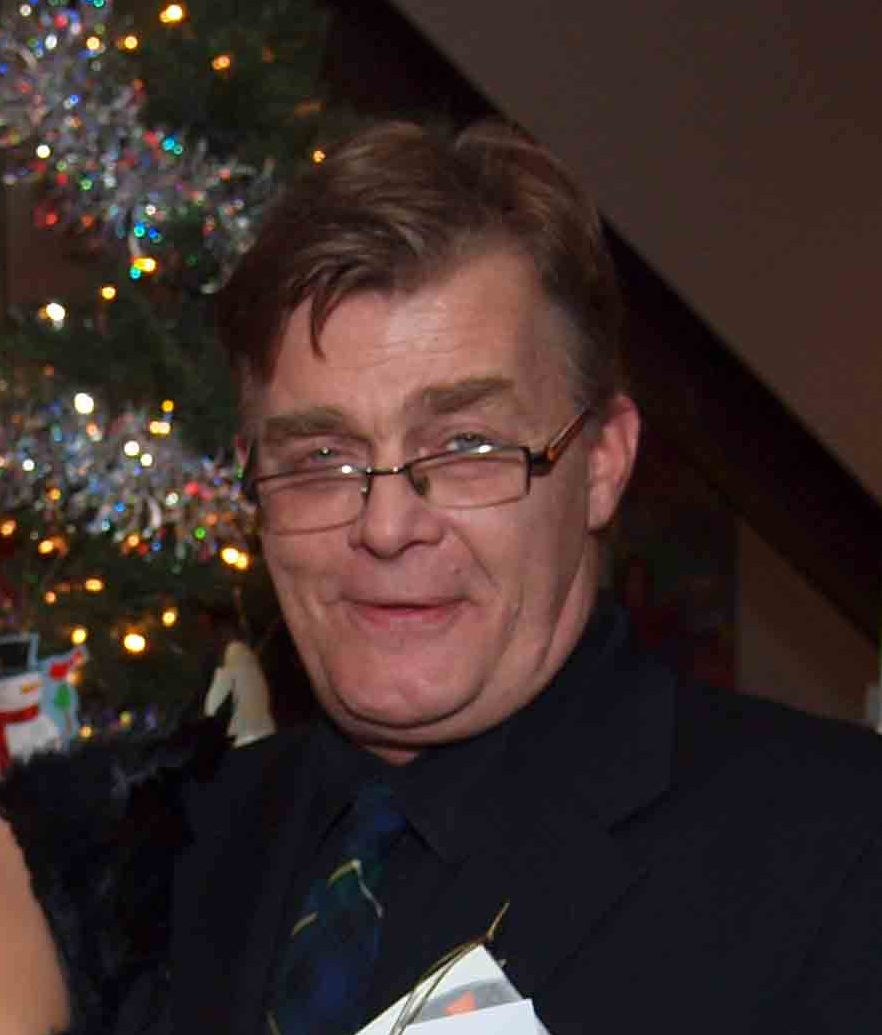
- Campbell in November 2010
- Born: 24 March 1952 (age 74); Toronto, Ontario, Canada
- Other name: Nick Campbell
- Education: Queen's University at Kingston; Drama Studio London; Royal Academy of Dramatic Art
- Occupations: Actor; director; producer; screenwriter
- Years active: 1970–present

Nicholas Campbell (born 24 March 1952) is a Canadian actor and filmmaker. He is a four-time Gemini Award winner, a three-time Genie Award nominee, and a Canadian Screen Award nominee. He is known for his portrayal of coroner Dominic Da Vinci on the crime drama television series Da Vinci's Inquest (1998-2005) and its spin-off Da Vinci's City Hall (2005-2006).

In film, Campbell is known for his collaborations with director David Cronenberg, starring in Fast Company (1979), The Brood (1979), The Dead Zone (1983), and Naked Lunch (1991). He has also notably appeared in A Bridge Too Far (1977), The Boys Club (1996), New Waterford Girl (1999), Prozac Nation (2001), Turning Paige (also 2001), Cinderella Man (2005), and Goon (2011). As a director, he made the acclaimed music documentary Stepping Razor: Red X.

== Early life ==
Campbell was born in Toronto and raised in Montreal. He went to Toronto's Upper Canada College and Kingston's Queen's University where he originally studied Political Studies but later switched to English and Drama. He continued his studies in England studying five years at Drama Studio London and at the Royal Academy of Dramatic Art (RADA).

== Career ==
Campbell started his acting career in the United Kingdom. He spent 40 weeks touring the country with the York Theatre Royal Repertory Company.

His debut film role was in The Omen, released in 1976. He subsequently played small roles in The Eagle Has Landed (1976), the James Bond movie The Spy Who Loved Me (1977), and the World War II epic A Bridge Too Far (1977). His co-starred in the 1977 ITV televised play Come Back, Little Sheba, opposite Laurence Olivier, Joanne Woodward and Carrie Fisher. He returned to Canada in 1979.

His starring film and television credits include series leads on Diamonds and The Hitchhiker. Campbell was third-billed in the 1985 movie Certain Fury. Playing Billy Quinn in CBC's Major Crime (1997) he won a Gemini Award for best actor for his work. His television credits also include the role of Bobby Kennedy in Hoover vs. The Kennedys (Gemini nominee for best actor in a miniseries), Going Home (nominated for BAFTA Award), and The Valour and the Horror. Other works include The Sleep Room, Diana Kilmury: Teamster (Gemini nomination for best supporting actor in a drama) and The Diary of Evelyn Lau.

Campbell has also worked extensively with David Cronenberg, appearing in such films as Naked Lunch, The Dead Zone, Fast Company, and The Brood. Campbell has made guest appearances on TV shows including Space: 1999, Airwolf, Blue Murder, (Gemini Award for Best Performance by an Actor in a Guest Role Dramatic Series in 2001) A Nero Wolfe Mystery, Street Legal, Republic of Doyle, and Highlander: The Series.

In addition to his acting career, Campbell is also an accomplished filmmaker. He wrote and directed the 1992 documentary film Stepping Razor: Red X, which received a Genie Award nomination for Best Feature Length Documentary at the 14th Genie Awards.

=== Da Vinci's Inquest ===
Campbell's role as coroner Dominic Da Vinci in Da Vinci's Inquest brought him critical acclaim. Da Vinci's Inquest was nominated for many Gemini Awards. Of the 11 Geminis the show won, it received three for best writing in a dramatic series and three for best dramatic series. Campbell received the Gemini Award for best performance in a continuing leading dramatic role for his work on the series. Campbell also directed a number of episodes of Da Vinci’s Inquest, being nominated in 2003, for the Directors Guild of Canada team drama award.

== Personal life ==
=== Controversy ===
In October 2022, Campbell was suspended from the CBC television series Coroner, after an incident where he referred to a Black grip technician as a "nigger" on a different production. The grip, Andre Mike, stated he was clearing stones for Campbell's path, he heard the actor say, "You winter niggers are used to this kind of weather." When the director of photography asked for clarification, Campbell said, "Well, you know, you northern niggers are used to it."

Campbell apologized in a statement to CBC News, but claimed he did not say any slurs, and was repeating a story secondhand. "That word should never be spoken aloud, certainly not by the likes of me, a white guy who is old enough to know better. It doesn't matter the context in which it was said. It doesn't matter that I was retelling a story, or that I was actually quoting someone else's usage of that word. That horrible and divisive word should never come out of my mouth. And it never will again." Mike stated he didn't accept Campbell's apology. After Mike complained to the producers, CBC announced they would suspend Campbell from the show.

== Filmography ==
=== Films ===
Year	Title	Role	Notes
1976	The Omen	Embassy Guard	
1977	A Bridge Too Far	Captain Glass	
1977	The Spy Who Loved Me	USS Wayne Crewman	
1979	Fast Company	Billy "The Kid" Brooker	
1979	H. G. Wells' The Shape of Things to Come	Jason Caball	
1979	The Brood	Chris	
1980	Day of Resurrection	Radio Operator - Palmer Station	
1981	Yesterday	Tony	
1981	Dirty Tricks	Bill Darcy	
1981	The Amateur	Schraeger	
1982	Trapped	Roger Michaels	
1982	Killing 'em Softly	Clifford	
1982	Love	Danny	segment: "For Life"
1983	The Dead Zone	Deputy Frank Dodd	
1985	Certain Fury	"Sniffer"	
1985	Terminal Choice	Henderson	
1986	Knights of the City	Joey	
1987	The Pink Chiquitas	Cast Member of Zombie Beach Party III	
1987	Rampage	Albert Morse	
1991	The Big Slice	Nick Papadopoulos	
1991	Naked Lunch	Hank	
1991	Shadow of the Wolf	Scott	
1992	Bordertown Café	Don	
1992	Stepping Razor: Red X		Documentary; as director
1993	Champagne For Two	Vincent	
1994	Boozecan		As director
1995	Butterbox Babies	Clayton Oliver	
1995	No Contest	Victor "Vic"	
1995	Jungleground	Robert Neilson	
1996	The Boys Club	Kyle's Dad	
1998	The Sleep Room	Lucas	
1998	A Cool, Dry Place	Frankie Gooland	
1999	New Waterford Girl	Frances Pottie	
2000	New Year's Day	Ollie	
2000	Saint Jude	Dad	
2000	We All Fall Down	Bruce	
2001	Prozac Nation	Donald Wurtzel	
2001	Turning Paige	Ross Fleming	
2004	Siblings	Dad	
2005	Cinderella Man	"Sporty" Lewis	
2007	14 Days in Paradise	Al Johnson	
2008	Inconceivable	Jonathan Banks	
2009	The Cry of the Owl	Jed Wyncoop	
2009	Love and Savagery	Senior Tinker	
2009	A Wake	Gabor Zazlov	
2010	Unrivaled	Raphael	
2011	Goon	Rollie Hortense	
2011	I'm Yours	Father	
2012	Antiviral	Dorian Lucas	
2013	Algonquin	Leif Roulette	
2013	Cubicle Warriors	Howard Ramsey	
2014	Backcountry	The Ranger	
2015	The Rainbow Kid	Bill	
2015	Unearthing	Sid Smith	
2016	The Addition	Max Wrathburn	
2016	Unless	The Stranger	
2017	Awakening the Zodiac	Ray	
2017	Never Steady, Never Still	Ed	
2017	The Sound	Taxi Driver #1	
2018	Rabbit	Bobby	
2020	The Oak Room	Gordon	
2020	Books of Blood	Sam Austin	
2020	Sugar Daddy	Jim	
2021	Defining Moments	Foddy	
2021	Hands That Bind	Mac Longridge	
2023	The Performance	Harold	
2023	Last County	Sheriff Bill McLean	

=== Television ===
Year	Title	Role	Notes
1976	Space: 1999	Eddie Collins	Episode: "A Matter of Balance"
1977	Come Back, Little Sheba	"Turk"	TV movie
1980	A Population of One	Mike	Television film
1983	The Hitchhiker	The Hitchhiker	Season 1
1986	The Insiders	Nick Fox	
1987	Airwolf	Jason "Doc" Gifford	Episodes: "Inn at the End of the Road", "Prisoner of Yesterday"
1987	Diamonds	Mike Devitt	
1987	Hoover vs. The Kennedys	Robert F. Kennedy	Miniseries
1990	Counterstrike	Westic	Episode: "Power Play"
1991	Counterstrike	Ron Smith	Episode: "Native Warriors"
1995	Highlander: The Series	Kit O'Brady	Episode: "Double Eagle"
1995	Kung Fu: The Legend Continues	Graham Corrigan	Episode: "Eye Witness"
1995	Dancing in the Dark	Mark Forbes	TV movie
1995	Due South	Nigel Ellis	Episode: "The Deal"
1998–2005	Da Vinci's Inquest	Dominic Da Vinci	Lead role
1999	Happy Face Murders	Rusty Zuvic	TV movie
2003	Human Cargo	Jerry Fischer	
2005	Da Vinci's City Hall	Dominic Da Vinci	Lead role
2008	The Quality of Life	Dominic Da Vinci	TV movie
2008	The Englishman's Boy	"Shorty" McAdoo	
2008	Flashpoint	George Orsten	
2008	The Border	Dougie Jackson	
2009	Murdoch Mysteries	Buffalo Bill	
2010–2014	Republic of Doyle	Martin Poole	Recurring role
2010	Haven	Garland Wournos	
2012	Less Than Kind	Jim Sheridan	Recurring role
2014	Rookie Blue	Jay Swarek	
2016	Shoot the Messenger	Henry Channing	
2016	Heartland	Will Vernon	Episode: "Here and Now"
2017	Black Mirror	Russ Sambrell	Episode: "Arkangel"
2017	Bad Blood	Lonnie Gardiner	Episode: "You Can Never Hold Back Spring"
2017	Tin Star	Wallace Lyle	Episodes: "Fun and (S)Laughter", "Jack"
2018	Private Eyes	Frank Garrison	Episode: "The Devil's Playground"
2019–2022	Coroner	Gordon Cooper	Recurring role
