= Sandy Wilson (director) =

Canadian film director

- Born: Sandra Wilson; 1947 (age 78–79); Penticton, British Columbia, Canada
- Occupations: Film director Screenwriter; Film editor
- Years active: 1969–present

Sandra "Sandy" Wilson (born 1947) is a Canadian film director and screenwriter, based in Vancouver, British Columbia. She is best known for her films My American Cousin (1985) and Harmony Cats (1992). Most of her films take place in the same areas she grew up: Penticton and the Okanagan.

Wilson has received critical acclaim for her films. At the 1986 Genie Awards, My American Cousin won six awards including Best Achievement in Direction, Best Original Screenplay and Best Motion Picture. Harmony Cats was nominated for Genie Awards in 1993.

== Early life and education ==
Sandra "Sandy" Wilson was born in 1947 in Penticton, British Columbia, and is of English descent. She grew up in Paradise Ranch just outside of Penticton.

She has a brother named Brian, who has a physical disability. He was the subject and inspiration for Wilson's 1972 documentary He's Not the Walking Kind.

Wilson studied English and History at Simon Fraser University. She never intended to become a filmmaker but when she signed up for a Film Workshop at the university, Wilson discovered her passion for moving images.

== Career ==
Wilson started her career in filmmaking in 1969. She began writing, producing and directing films in Vancouver. Much of Wilson's early work consists of short personal documentaries. For The Bridal Shower (1972), Growing Up in Paradise (1977) and He's Not the Walking Kind Wilson incorporated home video footage that her father shot on 16mm film.

The success of her early personal documentaries inspired Wilson to begin work on her first feature film. In 1972, during work on He's Not the Walking Kind, she began an outline of My American Cousin.

=== My American Cousin ===
My American Cousin is Wilson's first feature film. It is a semi-autobiographical film, inspired by her childhood memories. It follows a twelve-year-old girl's coming-of-age during a summer in the late 1950s in Okanagan, British Columbia.

The film was further inspired by the Johnny Horton song "The Battle of New Orleans." When she was working on the film, Wilson heard it on the radio and thought it reminded her of her American cousin, which became the inspiration for the film's title.

The budget for the film was $1.5 million and was fund raised over a two-year period. Wilson started the project by traveling to Toronto and pitching the film to "anyone with money." Wilson's childhood friend, Phil Borsos, also helped during the early days of My American Cousin. Borsos father, Peter O'Brien, was Sandy Wilson's high school art teacher. Borsos showed his father the script, and O'Brien eventually agreed to produce the film.

Much of the film was shot in the community where Wilson grew up: Paradise Ranch. Despite other executives on the film advising against it, Wilson cast her 13-year-old neighbour, Margaret Langrick, in the lead role of Sandy Wilcox.

My American Cousin won six Genie Awards at the 1986 ceremony, including Best Achievement in Direction and Best Original Screenplay for Wilson. Shortly after, My American Cousin opened in New York. There was debate on whether to label the film as Canadian for its American premiere. They settled on "winner of six Canadian Academy Awards."

=== American Boyfriends–present ===
After the success of My American Cousin there was pressure on Wilson to relocate to Los Angeles, but she chose to stay in Vancouver. As a single mom, with two young boys she wanted to focus on raising them in their home city.

Four years later, Wilson directed the sequel to My American Cousin, American Boyfriends (1989). The film follows Sandy Wilcox on a trip to Santa Cruz to see her cousin get married. During production in California, the local union limited the number of Canadian crew members to seven. They were given the label "privileged aliens" while working in the United States. The American crew members working on the film were all familiar with the original film, and happy to be working on its sequel.

American Boyfriends flopped and didn't receive the same success as My American Cousin. After American Boyfriends, Wilson worked in the television industry for four years.

In 1992, Wilson premiered Harmony Cats, which was different from all her films that came before. After American Boyfriends, Wilson didn't want to direct any more semi-autobiographical pieces.

== Filmography ==
| Year | Title | Type of film | Notes |
|---|---|---|---|
| 1969 | Garbage | Short | |
| 1970 | Penticton Profile | Short | |
| 1971 | Madeleine Is... | | assistant director |
| 1971 | Proxyhawks | | assistant director |
| 1972 | The Bridal Shower | Short | |
| 1972 | He's Not the Walking Kind | Short documentary | |
| 1975 | Pen High Grad | Short documentary | |
| 1976 | Raising the Gilhast Pole | Short | |
| 1976 | Going All the Way | Short | |
| 1977 | Growing Up in Paradise | Short | |
| 1977 | Teenage Money | Short | |
| 1979 | Coming Down | Short | |
| 1980 | Mount Chopaka Easter Sunday Jackpot Rodeo | TV movie | |
| 1985 | My American Cousin | feature film | |
| 1986 | Moving Day | TV movie | |
| 1988 | Mama's Going to Buy You a Mockingbird | TV movie | |
| 1989 | American Boyfriends | feature film | |
| 1992 | Harmony Cats | feature film | |
| 2000 | My Life in A Few Minutes | | also known as My Life in 8 Minutes, made for Crazy8s |

== Awards and nominations ==
| Year | Film | Award | Won |
|---|---|---|---|
| 1986 | My American Cousin | Genie Award for Best Achievement in Direction | Won |
| 1986 | My American Cousin | Genie Award for Best Original Screenplay | Won |
| 1986 | My American Cousin | Genie Award for Best Motion Picture | Won |
| 1993 | Harmony Cats | Genie Award for Best Achievement in Direction | Nominated |
| 1993 | Harmony Cats | Genie Award for Best Motion Picture | Nominated |
