= Alan Morinis =

Canadian author

- Born: December 8, 1949 (age 76); Toronto, Ontario, Canada
- Notable work: Everyday Holiness
- Spouse: Dr. Beverly Spring
- Children: Dr. Julia Orkin, Dr. Leora Morinis
- Theological work
- Language: English
- Tradition or movement: Musar Movement

Alan Morinis (born December 8, 1949) is a Canadian anthropologist, filmmaker, and writer who has been a leading figure in the contemporary revival of the Musar movement, a Jewish ethical movement.

== Early life and secular education ==
Morinis was born into a left-wing secular Jewish home in Toronto, Ontario, Canada. He completed his Ph.D. in Social Anthropology at Oxford University, which he attended on a Rhodes Scholarship (Ontario 1972). Morinis studied religious pilgrimages, especially in Hinduism, and authored the book Pilgrimage in the Hindu Tradition: A Case Study of West Bengal as well as edited Sacred Journeys: the anthropology of pilgrimage.

== Mussar education ==
After pioneering work in academia, and a successful career in television production, Morinis experienced a major professional failure that sent him reeling. He began to search Jewish tradition for spiritual guidance and came across the Mussar Movement. He began to study mussar under the tutelage of Rabbi Yechiel Yitzchok Perr. Morinis has described his early Mussar education in his book Climbing Jacob's Ladder.

== Revival of the Mussar movement ==
In 2004, Morinis founded the Mussar Institute, based in Vancouver, British Columbia. He sought to revive the Musar movement, which he saw as having largely died off after the Holocaust.

Morinis has been credited as being, along with Rabbi Ira F. Stone, the leading figure in the contemporary revival of the Musar movement among non-Orthodox Jews.

Frederic and Mary Ann Brussat of the web site Spirituality & Practice have described Morinis's teachings as offering "a treasure trove of spiritual practices," "explications of the practical spiritual tradition of Mussar," and "insights into how to change your behavior and bring out your soul." Geoffrey Claussen of Elon University has described Morinis as emphasizing "the honesty, humility, patience, and discipline that doing Musar requires" but as giving less attention to the importance of "traditional liturgy and community."

== Books ==
Morinis's books include:

- Climbing Jacob's Ladder: One Man's Journey to Rediscover a Jewish Spiritual Tradition (2007)
- Everyday Holiness: The Jewish Spiritual Path of Mussar (2008)
- Every Day, Holy Day: 365 Days of Teachings and Practices from the Jewish Tradition of Mussar (2010)
- With Heart in Mind: Mussar Teachings to Transform Your Life (2014)
- The Shabbat Effect: Jewish Wisdom for Growth and Transformation (2025)
