= List of Canadian producers =

This is a list of Canadian producers.

== A ==
- Alistair Abell
- David Acomba
- Alfons Adetuyi
- Robert Adetuyi
- Stacey Aglok Macdonald
- Marc Almon
- Paul Apak Angilirq
- Denys Arcand
- Paul Arcand
- Fraser Ash
- Shawn Ashmore
- Melissa Auf der Maur
- Gerald Auger
- Matt Austin
- Roger Avary
- Barry Avrich

== B ==
- Julie Baldassi (film)
- Enrique Miguel Baniqued (film)
- Paul Barbeau (film)
- Roman Bittman (film, television)
- Roger Blais
- Ryan Bobkin (film)
- William J. Bruce III (music, television)
- Colin Brunton (film)
- John Brunton (television, film)
- Howard Busgang (television)

== C ==
- Samuel Caron (film)
- Andrew Cividino (film)
- Norman Cohn (film)
- Samuel Cohn-Cousineau (film)
- David Cormican (film, television)
- Pierre Cossette
- Marie-Hélène Cousineau (film)

== D ==
- Bryan Demore (film)
- Miranda de Pencier (film, television)
- Nicholas de Pencier (film, television)
- Luc Déry (film)
- Sonya Di Rienzo (film)
- Damon D'Oliveira (film, television)
- Trish Dolman (film, television)
- Mike Downie (documentary)
- Fanny Drew (film)
- Dominique Dussault (film)

== E ==
- Line Sander Egede (film)
- Pierre Even (film)

== F ==
- Doug Falconer (film, television)
- Sandra Faire (television)
- Ina Fichman (documentary)
- Niv Fichman (film)
- Jonathan Frantz (film)
- Camelia Frieberg (film)

== G ==
- Jean-Martin Gagnon (film)
- Pierre Gendron (film)
- Sam Grana (film, television)
- Evan Goldberg
- Geneviève Gosselin-G. (film)
- Harold Greenberg
- Matt Greyson (film, television)

== H ==
- Tyler Hagan (film)
- Étienne Hansez (film)
- Karen Harnisch (film, television)
- Denis Héroux (film)
- Justine Héroux (film, television)

== J ==
- Dominic James (film)

== K ==
- Martin Katz (film)
- Anthony Kramreither (film)
- Kevin Krikst (film)
- Peter Kuplowsky (film)

== L ==
- John Labow (television)
- Robert Lantos (film)
- Christian Larouche (film, television)
- Yanick Létourneau (film)
- Arvi Liimatainen (film, television)
- Colette Loumède (film)
- Lori Lozinski (film, television)

== M ==
- Jenna MacMillan (film)
- Sarah Mannering (film)
- Bill Marshall (film)
- Trevor Matthews
- Louis B. Mayer (film)
- Kim McCraw (film)
- Michael McNamara (film, television)
- Susan Millican (news)
- Leena Minifie (film, television)

== N ==
- Aubrey Nealon (television)
- Debbie Nightingale (film, television)

== O ==
- Hany Ouichou (film)

== P ==
- Gharrett Patrick Paon (film)
- Lew Parry (film)
- Martin Paul-Hus (film)
- Patricia Phillips (documentary)
- Noah Pink (television)
- Christina Piovesan (film, television)
- Laurie Pominville (film)
- Jeanne-Marie Poulain (film)
- Marie-Claude Poulin (film)
- Aeschylus Poulos (film)

== R ==
- Odessa Rae (documentary)
- Ménaïc Raoul (film)
- Denise Robert (film)
- Nicole Robert (film)
- Brian Robertson (film)
- Jason Ryle (film)

== S ==
- Phil Savath (film, television)
- Mary Sexton (film, television)
- Zev Shalev (television)
- Michael Spencer (film)
- Greg Spottiswood (film, television)
- Rebecca Steele (film, television)
- David Studer (television news)

== T ==
- Kevin Tierney (film)
- Todd Thicke (television)
- Gabrielle Tougas-Fréchette (film)

== V ==
- Henk Van der Kolk (film)
- Clement Virgo (film)

== W ==
- Andrea Werhun (film)
- Ron Weyman (television)
- Stefan Wodoslawsky (film, television)
- Tara Woodbury (film, television)
- Sara Wylie (film)

== Z ==
- Moses Znaimer (television)
