= List of writers from the Canadian territories =

The Canadian territories of Nunavut, Yukon, and the Northwest Territories have produced writers across a variety of genres. This list includes notable writers who were born in the Canadian territories or spent a significant portion of their writing career living in the Canadian territories.

== Northwest Territories ==
- Robert Arthur Alexie (1957–2014), novelist
- George Calef (living), nature writer
- Kirsten Carthew (living), screenwriter
- Alice Masak French (1930–2013), autobiographer
- Jessa Gamble (born 1979), science writer, journalist
- Shane Koyczan (born 1976), poet
- Margaret Pokiak-Fenton (1969–2021), children's writer
- Richard Van Camp (born 1971), novelist

== Nunavut ==
- Siku Allooloo (born 1986), non-fiction writer, poet
- Paul Apak Angilirq (1954–1998), screenwriter
- Alethea Arnaquq-Baril (born 1978), screenwriter
- Larry Audlaluk (born 1953), memoirist
- Susan Avingaq (1942–2024), screenwriter
- Norman Cohn (born 1946), screenwriter
- Tommy Enuaraq (living), children's writer
- Ann Meekitjuk Hanson (born 1946), journalist
- Kenn Harper (living), historian
- Nyla Innuksuk (living), screenwriter
- Alootook Ipellie (1951–2007), poet, non-fiction writer
- Piita Irniq (born 1947)
- Madeline Ivalu (living), screenwriter
- Aviaq Johnston (born 1992), novelist, children's writer
- Celina Kalluk (living), children's writer
- Carol Kunnuk (living), screenwriter
- Zacharias Kunuk (born 1957), screenwriter
- Michael Kusugak (born 1948), novelist, children's writer
- Stacey Aglok MacDonald (living), screenwriter
- Stephen Osborne (born 1947), non-fiction writer, essayist
- Peter Pitseolak (1902–1973), historian
- Tanya Tagaq (born 1975), novelist
- Ningiukulu Teevee (born 1963), children's writer
- Rachel Qitsualik-Tinsley (living), novelist
- Sean Qitsualik-Tinsley (living), novelist
- Sheila Watt-Cloutier (born 1953), non-fiction writer, memoirist

== Yukon ==
- Robbie Benoit (died 2007), poet
- Pierre Berton (1920–2004), historian, journalist
- Cassandra Blanchard (living), poet
- Ivan Coyote (living), poet
- Joyce Hayden (1931–2009), historian
- Candice Hopkins (born 1977), non-fiction writer
- Edith Josie (1921–2010), journalist
- Dawn Macdonald (living), poet
- Gurdeep Pandher (living), poet
- Cole Pauls (living), comic book writer
- Edward Peghin (living)
- Louise Profeit-LeBlanc (born 1951)
- Robert W. Service (1874–1958), poet, novelist, non-fiction writer
- Angela Sidney (1902–1991)
- Melanie Siebert (living), poet

== See also ==
- Lists of Canadian writers
