= Tautuktavuk (What We See) =

2023 Canadian drama film

- Theatrical release poster
- Directed by: Carol Kunnuk; Lucy Tulugarjuk
- Written by: Lucy Tulugarjuk; Carol Kunnuk; Gillian Robinson; Samuel Cohn-Cousineau; Norman Cohn
- Produced by: Lucy Tulugarjuk; Jonathan Frantz
- Starring: Carol Kunnuk; Mark Taqqaugaq; Lucy Tulugarjuk; Benjamin Kunuk
- Cinematography: Jonathan Frantz
- Edited by: Jeremiah Hayes
- Music by: Beatrice Deer; Lucy Tulugarjuk; Mark Wheaton
- Production company: Kingulliit Productions
- Distributed by: Isuma
- Release date: September 10, 2023 (TIFF)
- Running time: 82 minutes
- Country: Canada
- Language: Inuktitut

Tautuktavuk (What We See) is a Canadian drama film directed by Carol Kunnuk and Lucy Tulugarjuk.

The film had its world premiere in the Discovery program at the 2023 Toronto International Film Festival. It had its commercial premiere in Igloolik. It was later named to TIFF's annual Canada's Top Ten list for 2023.

The film centres on Saqpinak (Kunnuk) and Uyarak (Tulugarjuk), two Inuit sisters whose lives have significantly diverged as Uyarak lives in Montreal while Saqpinak has remained in Igloolik, Nunavut, who are reconnecting through regular video chats during the COVID-19 pandemic.

The cast also includes Susan Avingaq, Leah Panimera, Beatrice Deer and Madeline Ivalu in supporting roles.

== Distribution ==
The film had its world premiere in the Discovery program at the 2023 Toronto International Film Festival.

It premiered commercially in a screening at the Igloolik High School in Igloolik in January 2024, in advance of several further film festival screenings in southern Canada and a spring tour of other communities in the Arctic.

== Response ==
The film was named to TIFF's annual Canada's Top Ten list for 2023.

Johanna Schneller of The Globe and Mail praised the film, writing that "It doesn’t matter which parts of the verité-style film Tautuktavuk (What We See) are scripted and which aren’t. Co-directors Lucy Tulugarjuk and Carol Kunnuk have woven their experiences and those of friends and family into a documentary/fiction hybrid that doesn’t have to worry about what’s real, because it’s about what’s true: The persistence of trauma in Inuit communities. The ubiquity of abuse – sexual and physical, domestic and institutional. The grave lack of support systems in the North. The solace of community. The effort of healing."

When interviewing Tulugaruk about the film, Liam Lacey of Original Cin speculated that the film's principal promotional image, depicting Uyarak running away from her abusive spouse through the streets of Igloolik in her bare feet, was an allusion to the climactic scene in the influential 2001 film Atanarjuat: The Fast Runner; Tulugarjuk stated that while she had expected that question to be raised, it was not intended as such.

== Awards ==
At TIFF, the film won the Amplify Voices Award for Best First Film.
