= Lucy Tulugarjuk =

Inuk actress, throat singer and director

- Born: February 28, 1975 (age 51); Igloolik, Nunavut, Canada
- Occupations: Actress; Throat singer Director
- Children: Nuvvija Mikili Tulugarjuk
- Relatives: Madeline Ivalu (aunt)

Lucy Tulugarjuk (born February 28, 1975) is an Inuk Canadian actress, throat singer, and director. She is executive director for the Nunavut Independent Television Network. She is best known to international audiences for appearing in Mission: Impossible – The Final Reckoning (2025).

== Early life ==
Tulugarjuk is from Igloolik, Nunavut.

== Career ==
Tulugarjuk is known for starring in the 2001 film Atanarjuat: The Fast Runner, for which she won the award for Best Actress at the American Indian Film Festival. In 2015, she acted in the film Maliglutit.

In 2017 she directed her first feature-length film Tia and Piujuq (Inuktitut: ᑏᐊ ᐊᒻᒪᓗ ᐱᐅᔪᖅ). The film featured Marie-Hélène Cousineau as producer, and Tulugarjuk's daughter in the lead role as Piujuq.

With Carol Kunnuk she was co-director, co-writer and co-star of Tautuktavuk (What We See), which premiered at the Toronto International Film Festival in 2023 and won the Amplify Voices Award for Best First Film.

She performs as a throat singer, but in 2014 declined to perform for Nunavut MP Leona Aglukkaq in protest of the government's seismic testing. That year, she wore seal skin at the Gone Wild show in Fort Smith, Northwest Territories to support Inuit culture. In 2016, she also called for the resignation of Aglukkaq's successor as MP, Hunter Tootoo.

She is executive director for Nunavut Independent Television Network, a service of Isuma based in Igloolik. In 2021, Isuma launched Uvagut TV, a 24/7 online channel devoted to Inuktitut language programming, for which Tulugarjuk is managing director. Tulugarjuk reported that she sees the channel as "a tool for preserving and revitalizing the Inuit people's language and culture."

== Filmography ==
=== As actress ===
Year	Title	Role	Notes
2001	Atanarjuat: The Fast Runner	Puja	
2005	L'iceberg	Nattikuttuk	
2006	The Journals of Knud Rasmussen	Nuvvija	
2007	Issaittuq		Title translated as 'waterproof'
2013	Maïna	Aasivak	
2016	Searchers		'Maliglutit' in Ikutitut.
2018	Tia and Piujuq	Tarriagsuk Ansaana	
2020	Angakusajaujuq: The Shaman's Apprentice	Young Shaman	
2023	Tautuktavuk (What We See)	Uyarak	
2025	Mission: Impossible – The Final Reckoning	Tapeesa	

=== As filmmaker ===
Year	Title	Role	Notes
2006	The Journals of Knud Rasmussen	Writer, casting director, makeup artist	Credited with writing the Inuktitut dialogue
2018	Tia and Piujuq	Director, writer	
2019	Restless River	Co-producer	
2023	Tautuktavuk (What We See)	Co-director, co-writer, actor	with Carol Kunnuk

== Accolades ==
Year	Award	Category	Nominated work	Result
2001	American Indian Film Festival	Best Actress	Atanarjuat: The Fast Runner	Won
2023	Toronto International Film Festival	Amplify Voices BIPOC Canadian First Feature Award	Tautuktavuk (What We See)	Won
