= Carol Kunnuk =

Inuk actress and filmmaker

Saqpinaq Carol Kunnuk is an Inuk actress and filmmaker from Canada, noted for her work with both Arnait Video Productions and Isuma Studios.

== Career ==
She had acting roles in the films The Journals of Knud Rasmussen, Waterproof (Issaittuq), and Uvanga, and was interviewed in the 2015 documentary film Igloolik, a Real Tale.

As a filmmaker, she was an assistant director on Knud Rasmussen and Before Tomorrow before releasing her debut documentary film, Queen of the Quest, in 2010.

In 2017, she and Zacharias Kunuk co-directed the mid-length documentary film Bowhead Whale Hunting with My Ancestors, which won the award for Best Indigenous Language Production at the 2017 ImagineNATIVE Film and Media Arts Festival. In 2019, she directed the short documentary film Ataguttaaluk: A Life to Live For.

In November 2021, her short documentary film Being Prepared, which centred on how her home community of Igloolik coped with the COVID-19 pandemic, was broadcast by Uvagut TV.

Tautuktavuk (What We See), a film co-directed by and co-starring Kunnuk and Lucy Tulugarjuk, premiered in the Discovery program at the 2023 Toronto International Film Festival, and won the Amplify Voices Award for Best First Film.
