= Nunavut: Our Land =

1994 Canadian documentary television series

- Genre: Docudrama
- Created by: Zacharias Kunuk; Norman Cohn
- Country of origin: Canada
- Original language: English
- No. of seasons: 1
- No. of episodes: 13

Production
- Production company: Isuma

Original release
- Network: Knowledge Network; TVOntario; TFO
- Release: 1994 – 1995

Nunavut: Our Land is a Canadian docudrama series, which aired in 1994 and 1995. Created by Zacharias Kunuk and Norman Cohn through their Isuma studio to mark the 1993 passage of the Nunavut Act that authorized the creation of the territory of Nunavut, the 13-episode series featured short films of contemporary Inuit recreating historical scenes of Inuit culture and society.

The series was aired by Knowledge Network, TVOntario and TFO in the 1990s, but did not attract significant notice at the time. It began to receive more widespread attention in the early 2000s following the breakout success of Kunuk's 2001 film Atanarjuat: The Fast Runner, including a screening in Germany as part of the Documenta11 art exhibition in 2002, and a full national rebroadcast in Canada by Bravo in 2003.

In 2004, the series was released on DVD by Vtape as part of Isuma's eight-disc Inuit Culture Kit box set, which was later replaced by the expanded Inuit Classic Collection set in 2007.

In 2017, it was included in Canada On Screen, a special screening series of significant film and video works from throughout the history of Canadian cinema, which was staged by the Toronto International Film Festival to mark Canada 150.

== Episodes ==
No.	Title
1	"Qimuksik (Dog Team)"
2	"Avaja"
3	"Qarmaq (Stone House)"
4	"Tugaliaq (Ice Blocks)"
5	"Angiraq (Home)"
6	"Auriaq (Stalking)"
7	"Qulangisi (Seal Pups)"
8	"Avamuktulik (Fish Swimming Back and Forth)"
9	"Aiviaq (Walrus Hunt)"
10	"Qaisut"
11	"Tuktuliaq (Caribou Hunt)"
12	"Unaaq (Harpoon)"
13	"Quviasukvik (Happy Day)"
