= Jonathan Frantz =

Canadian cinematographer

- Born: London, Ontario, Canada
- Education: University of British Columbia (MA)
- Occupations: Cinematographer, film producer
- Years active: 2012–present
- Organization: Isuma
- Known for: Indigenous filmmaking in Nunavut
- Awards: Canadian Screen Award for Best Animated Short (2022)

Jonathan Frantz is a Canadian cinematographer and film producer, associated with the Isuma filmmaking collective in Nunavut.

He is most noted as a producer of Zacharias Kunuk's films Angakusajaujuq: The Shaman's Apprentice, which won the Canadian Screen Award for Best Animated Short at the 10th Canadian Screen Awards in 2022, and Wrong Husband (Uiksaringitara), which was a nominee for Best Picture at the 14th Canadian Screen Awards in 2026.

Raised in London, Ontario, he studied economics in university and worked as a banker before losing interest in the industry and returning to the University of British Columbia to do a master's degree in community planning, graduating in 2004. After doing some video production in his community planning work, in 2012 he moved to Igloolik to work with Kunuk, working in all aspects of the film business for a number of years with Kunuk and Isuma. His first full film credit as a cinematographer and producer was on Kunuk's 2016 film Searchers (Maliglutut).

In 2018 he was producer and cinematographer on Edge of the Knife (SG̲aawaay Ḵ'uuna), the first Haida language feature film.

== Credits ==
- Searchers (Maliglutut) - 2016, cinematographer and producer
- Tia and Piujuq - 2018, cinematographer
- Edge of the Knife (SG̲aawaay Ḵ'uuna) - 2018, cinematographer and producer
- One Day in the Life of Noah Piugattuk - 2019, cinematographer and producer
- The Shadow Trap - 2019, executive producer
- Angakusajaujuq: The Shaman's Apprentice - 2021, producer and co-writer
- Tautuktavuk (What We See) - 2023, cinematographer and producer
- Wrong Husband (Uiksaringitara) - 2025, cinematographer and producer

== Awards ==
Award	Date of ceremony	Category	Work	Result	Ref.
American Indian Film Festival	2019	Best Film	Edge of the Knife (SG̲aawaay Ḵ'uuna)	Won	
Canadian Screen Awards	2022	Best Animated Short	Angakusajaujuq: The Shaman's Apprentice	Won	
Canadian Screen Awards	2026	Best Picture	Wrong Husband (Uiksaringitara)	Nominated	
Leo Awards	2019	Best Motion Picture	Edge of the Knife (SG̲aawaay Ḵ'uuna)	Won	
Leo Awards	2019	Best Cinematography	Edge of the Knife (SG̲aawaay Ḵ'uuna)	Nominated	
