= One Day in the Life of Noah Piugattuk =

- Directed by: Zacharias Kunuk
- Written by: Zacharias Kunuk; Norman Cohn
- Produced by: Zacharias Kunuk; Jonathan Frantz
- Starring: Apayata Kotierk; Kim Bodnia; Benjamin Kunuk
- Cinematography: Norman Cohn; Jonathan Frantz
- Edited by: Norman Cohn; Jonathan Frantz
- Production company: Isuma
- Release date: May 11, 2019 (Venice)
- Running time: 111 minutes
- Country: Canada
- Language: English

One Day in the Life of Noah Piugattuk is a Canadian drama film, directed by Zacharias Kunuk and released in 2019. The film dramatizes the true story of Noah Piugattuk (Apayata Kotierk), an Inuk hunter, over the day in 1961 when he was fatefully approached by a Canadian government agent (Kim Bodnia) who encouraged him to give up the traditional Inuit lifestyle and assimilate into a conventionally modern settlement.

The film premiered on May 11, 2019 at the Canadian pavilion in the 58th Venice Biennale. It received its Canadian premiere at the 2019 Toronto International Film Festival.

At the 2019 Vancouver International Film Festival, the film received the award for Best Canadian Film. In December 2019, the film was named to the Toronto International Film Festival's annual year-end Canada's Top Ten list.
