= Angakusajaujuq: The Shaman's Apprentice =

2021 Canadian film

- Film poster
- Directed by: Zacharias Kunuk
- Written by: Zacharias Kunuk; Jonathan Frantz
- Produced by: Neil Christopher; Jonathan Frantz; Zacharias Kunuk; Nadia Mike
- Starring: Madeline Ivalu; Jacky Qrunnut; Lucy Tulugarjuk
- Cinematography: Evan Derushie
- Edited by: Evan Derushie; Daniel Dietzel; Maia Iotzova
- Music by: Beatrice Deer; Sylvia Ipirautaq Cloutier
- Production companies: Kingulliit Productions; Taqqut Productions
- Distributed by: Isuma
- Release date: June 14, 2021 (Annecy)
- Running time: 20 minutes
- Country: Canada
- Languages: English; Inuktitut

Angakusajaujuq: The Shaman's Apprentice is a 2021 Canadian animated short film, directed by Zacharias Kunuk.

== Summary ==
A story about the traditional Inuit role of the shaman, the film centres on a grandmother (Madeline Ivalu) and granddaughter (Lucy Tulugarjuk) who travel to the underworld in an effort to heal an ill young hunter (Jacky Qrunnut).

== Release ==
The film was released alongside a children's picture book of the story, written by Kunuk and illustrated by Megan Kyak-Monteith. The book was published in both English and Inuktitut; the latter edition won the 2021 Indigenous Voices Award for work published in an indigenous language.

The film premiered at the 2021 Annecy International Animation Film Festival, where it won the FIPRESCI Award. It had its Canadian premiere at the 2021 Toronto International Film Festival, where it won the award for Best Canadian Short Film.

== Reception ==
The film was named to TIFF's annual year-end Canada's Top Ten list for 2021. It was on a shortlist for the Academy Award for Best Animated Short Film for the 94th Academy Awards but ultimately was not nominated, and won the Canadian Screen Award for Best Animated Short at the 10th Canadian Screen Awards in 2022.

It also won Best Independent Short Film at the Festival Stop Montreal.
