= Leah Panimera =

Leah Angutimarik Panimera is a Canadian actress. She is most noted for her performance in the 2025 film Wrong Husband (Uiksaringitara), for which she received a Canadian Screen Award nomination for Best Supporting Performance in a Drama Film at the 14th Canadian Screen Awards in 2026.

She previously had supporting roles in the films The Journals of Knud Rasmussen and Tautuktavuk (What We See).
