= Theresia Kappianaq =

Theresia Kappianaq is a Canadian actress. She is most noted for her performance in the 2025 film Wrong Husband (Uiksaringitara), for which she received a Canadian Screen Award nomination for Best Lead Performance in a Drama Film at the 14th Canadian Screen Awards in 2026.
