= Kivitoo: What They Thought of Us =

2018 film directed by Zacharias Kunuk

- Directed by: Zacharias Kunuk
- Production company: Isuma
- Release date: October 21, 2018 (imagineNATIVE)
- Running time: 43 minutes
- Country: Canada
- Language: Inuktitut

Kivitoo: What They Thought of Us is a Canadian documentary film, directed by Zacharias Kunuk and released in 2018. The film explores the history of Kivitoo, an Inuit community on Baffin Island whose residents were evacuated in 1963 due to a temporary safety concern, but who were never able to return to the community following the incident because it was fully demolished by authorities for reasons that have never been publicly confirmed.

The film premiered at the imagineNATIVE Film + Media Arts Festival in 2018.
