= Toronto International Film Festival Award for Best Canadian Film =

Annual Canadian film award

The Toronto International Film Festival Award for Best Canadian Film is an annual juried film award, presented by the Toronto International Film Festival to a film judged to be the best Canadian feature film.

As with TIFF's other juried awards, the jury has the discretion to name one or more honorable mentions in addition to the overall winner, but are normally expected to name a single winner. On only one occasion to date, in 1997, were two full winners of the award named in the same year.

From 2020 to 2022, the award was presented as one of three Amplify Voices awards rather than as a standalone category. The Amplify Voices awards were presented to three films overall, with one award open to all feature films made by Canadian directors and designated as the Amplify Voices Award for Best Canadian Film, while the other two awards were open to any feature films, regardless of nationality, directed by BIPOC filmmakers; however, all three awards were selected and presented by the same jury. In 2023, this ceased and the award reverted to being presented separately from the Amplify Voices awards, although the same jury remained in charge of presenting both awards.

In 2024, concurrently with the reintroduction of the Best Canadian Discovery Award, TIFF announced a slight change to the award rules, whereby it will now only be open to films which are their filmmakers' third or later titles, while first or second films will be eligible only for the Discovery award.

== Winners ==
Films whose titles are highlighted in yellow were the winners of the award; non-highlighted films were given honorable mentions.

Year	Film	Director	ACCT honours	Reference
1984	A Woman in Transit (La Femme de l'hôtel)	Léa Pool	Best Picture nominee (6th Genie Awards)	
1985	Canada's Sweetheart: The Saga of Hal C. Banks	Donald Brittain		
1986	The Decline of the American Empire (Le déclin de l'empire américain)	Denys Arcand	Best Picture winner (8th Genie Awards)	
1986	Sitting in Limbo	John N. Smith		
1987	Family Viewing	Atom Egoyan	Best Picture nominee (9th Genie Awards)	
1987	Artist on Fire	Kay Armatage		
1988	The Outside Chance of Maximilian Glick	Allan A. Goldstein	Best Picture nominee (10th Genie Awards)	
1989	Roadkill	Bruce McDonald		
1990	H	Darrell Wasyk		
1991	The Adjuster	Atom Egoyan		
1991	The Grocer's Wife	John Pozer	Claude Jutra Award winner (14th Genie Awards)	
1992	Requiem for a Handsome Bastard (Requiem pour un beau sans-coeur)	Robert Morin	Best Picture nominee (13th Genie Awards)	
1992	Léolo	Jean-Claude Lauzon	Best Picture nominee (13th Genie Awards)	
1992	Manufacturing Consent	Mark Achbar and Peter Wintonick		
1993	Kanehsatake: 270 Years of Resistance	Alanis Obomsawin	Best Documentary nominee (15th Genie Awards)	
1993	Thirty Two Short Films About Glenn Gould	François Girard	Best Picture winner (14th Genie Awards)	
1993	Zero Patience	John Greyson		
1994	Exotica	Atom Egoyan	Best Picture winner (15th Genie Awards)	
1994	Double Happiness	Mina Shum	Best Picture nominee (15th Genie Awards)	
1994	Windigo	Robert Morin		
1995	Live Bait	Bruce Sweeney		
1995	Curtis's Charm	John L'Ecuyer		
1995	Rude	Clement Virgo	Best Picture nominee (16th Genie Awards)	
1996	Long Day's Journey into Night	David Wellington	Best Picture nominee (17th Genie Awards)	
1996	Kissed	Lynne Stopkewich		
1997	The Hanging Garden	Thom Fitzgerald	Best Picture nominee (18th Genie Awards)	
1997	The Sweet Hereafter	Atom Egoyan	Best Picture winner (18th Genie Awards)	
1998	Nô	Robert Lepage		
1999	The Five Senses	Jeremy Podeswa	Best Picture nominee (20th Genie Awards)	
1999	Set Me Free (Emporte-moi)	Léa Pool		
2000	waydowntown	Gary Burns		
2000	Maelström	Denis Villeneuve	Best Picture winner (21st Genie Awards)	
2001	Atanarjuat: The Fast Runner	Zacharias Kunuk	Best Picture winner (22nd Genie Awards)	
2002	Spider	David Cronenberg		
2003	The Barbarian Invasions (Les Invasions barbares)	Denys Arcand	Best Picture winner (24th Genie Awards)	
2004	It's All Gone Pete Tong	Michael Dowse	Best Picture nominee (25th Genie Awards)	
2004	Scared Sacred	Velcrow Ripper	Best Documentary winner (26th Genie Awards)	
2005	C.R.A.Z.Y.	Jean-Marc Vallée	Best Picture winner (26th Genie Awards)	
2006	Manufactured Landscapes	Jennifer Baichwal	Best Documentary winner (27th Genie Awards)	
2006	Monkey Warfare	Reginald Harkema		
2007	My Winnipeg	Guy Maddin	Best Documentary nominee (29th Genie Awards)	
2008	Lost Song	Rodrigue Jean		
2008	Adoration	Atom Egoyan		
2009	Cairo Time	Ruba Nadda		
2009	The Legacy (La Donation)	Bernard Émond		
2010	Incendies	Denis Villeneuve	Best Picture winner (31st Genie Awards)	
2011	Monsieur Lazhar	Philippe Falardeau	Best Picture winner (32nd Genie Awards)	
2012	Laurence Anyways	Xavier Dolan	Best Picture nominee (1st Canadian Screen Awards)	
2013	When Jews Were Funny	Alan Zweig		
2014	Felix and Meira (Félix et Meira)	Maxime Giroux	Best Picture nominee (3rd Canadian Screen Awards)	
2015	Closet Monster	Stephen Dunn		
2015	My Internship in Canada (Guibord s'en va-t-en guerre)	Philippe Falardeau	Best Picture nominee (4th Canadian Screen Awards)	
2016	Those Who Make Revolution Halfway Only Dig Their Own Graves (Ceux qui font les révolutions à moitié n'ont fait que se creuser un tombeau)	Mathieu Denis and Simon Lavoie	Best Picture nominee (5th Canadian Screen Awards)	
2017	Ravenous (Les Affamés)	Robin Aubert	Best Picture nominee (6th Canadian Screen Awards)	
2017	The Little Girl Who Was Too Fond of Matches (La petite fille qui aimait trop les allumettes)	Simon Lavoie	Best Picture nominee (6th Canadian Screen Awards)	
2018	The Fireflies Are Gone (La disparition des lucioles)	Sébastien Pilote		
2019	Antigone	Sophie Deraspe	Best Picture winner (8th Canadian Screen Awards)	
2019	The Body Remembers When the World Broke Open	Elle-Máijá Tailfeathers and Kathleen Hepburn	Best Picture nominee (8th Canadian Screen Awards)	
2020	Inconvenient Indian	Michelle Latimer		
2020	Fauna	Nicolás Pereda		
2021	Ste. Anne	Rhayne Vermette		
2021	Scarborough	Shasha Nakhai, Rich Williamson	Best Picture winner (10th Canadian Screen Awards)	
2022	To Kill a Tiger	Nisha Pahuja	Best Documentary winner (11th Canadian Screen Awards)	
2022	Viking	Stéphane Lafleur	Best Picture nominee (11th Canadian Screen Awards)	
2023	Solo	Sophie Dupuis	Best Picture nominee (12th Canadian Screen Awards)	
2023	Kanaval	Henri Pardo	John Dunning Best First Feature nominee (12th Canadian Screen Awards)	
2024	Shepherds (Berger)	Sophie Deraspe		
2025	Wrong Husband (Uiksaringitara)	Zacharias Kunuk	Best Picture nominee (14th Canadian Screen Awards)	
2025	There Are No Words	Min Sook Lee		
2026	Sunburn	Serville Poblete		
2026	Man in Motion: The Rick Hansen Story	Adrian Buitenhuis		

== See also ==
- Vancouver International Film Festival Award for Best Canadian Film
