= Samuel Cohn-Cousineau =

Canadian screenwriter and film producer

Samuel Cohn-Cousineau is a Canadian screenwriter and film producer who works in both Quebec and Nunavut. He is most noted as a producer of Zacharias Kunuk's 2025 film Wrong Husband (Uiksaringitara), which was a Canadian Screen Award nominee for Best Motion Picture at the 14th Canadian Screen Awards in 2026.

The son of filmmakers Norman Cohn and Marie-Hélène Cousineau, he was a co-writer of the films Tia and Piujuq and Tautuktavuk (What We See).
