= Chris Crilly =

Canadian musician and composer

Chris Crilly is a Canadian musician and composer, who has won the Genie Award for Best Original Score at the 22nd Genie Awards in 2002 for Atanarjuat: The Fast Runner.

He was born in Bangor, County Down, Northern Ireland in 1948 and educated in England and Canada, with choral training in the Schola Cantorum tradition under Geoffrey Tristram at St. Peter's School and Christchurch Priory, Dorset UK. He also studied the piano with Audrey King.

Crilly was exposed to West African music while his family was stationed in Ghana during the 1950s and 60's. Moving to Canada in 1967, he was trained in filmmaking at Loyola College Université de Montréal. It was after an extended stay in Ghana in 1970 to 1971 that Crilly began his searched for collaborators in a new approach to Celtic music; one that would step outside the traditional constraints. He felt a need to combine his classical choral training and the percussion possibilities he experienced in West Africa.

In 1973, in Montreal, Crilly teamed up with fellow Irishman Toby Kinsella, guitarist Richard Chapman, fiddler Elliot Selick, singer and guitarist Pierre Guérin, and percussionist Ed Moore to form Na Baird, the Montreal Celtic band which was to become Barde. Crilly toured with Barde throughout Canada and the eastern U.S. until 1980. During that time the band released two albums: "BARDE" 1977 and "IMAGES" 1978. In January 1980 Crilly left the band, which would release one further album, "VOYAGES" 1982, before disbanding.

Chris Crilly's rhapsody for violin and piano, The Eagle and the Loon (1997), was commissioned by Mohawk violinist Tara-Louise Montour. In 2001 Crilly composed the score for Zacharias Kunuk's Inuit feature film Atanarjuat: The Fast Runner. He has also composed music for television series, animation, and documentary films, including: Strings/Cordes, The Boys of St. Vincent, Frank the Wrabbit, Short Infinity, and Eckhart. In 2016 Crilly collaborated with singer/composer Tanya Tagaq on the score for Kunuk's feature film Maliglutit/Searchers.

From 1990 to 1995 Crilly was a music and sound editor at the National Film Board of Canada. From 1990 to 2018 he taught in the Concordia University departments of Cinema and Communication. Chris Crilly lives in Havelock, Québec, with his wife, artist Catherine Farish.
