= Igloolik Airport =

Airport in Nunavut, Canada

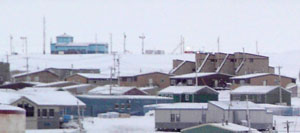
- The airport in Igloolik is located above the town. It is the blue building at the upper left of this photo. November 2005.
- IATA: YGT; ICAO: CYGT

Summary
- Airport type: Public
- Operator: Government of Nunavut
- Location: Igloolik, Nunavut
- Time zone: EST (UTC−05:00)
  - Summer (DST): EDT (UTC−04:00)
- Elevation AMSL: 173 ft / 53 m
- Coordinates: 69°21′53″N 081°48′59″W

Map
- Location in Nunavut CYGT (Canada)

Runways
Direction	Length		Surface
Direction	ft	m	Surface
15/33	4,095	1,248	Gravel

Statistics (2010)
- Aircraft movements: 1,323
- Source: Canada Flight Supplement; Movements from Statistics Canada

Igloolik Airport (Inuktitut: ᐃᒡᓗᓕᒃ ᒥᑦᑕᕐᕕᐊ Iglulik Mittarvia) (IATA: YGT, ICAO: CYGT) is located at Igloolik, Nunavut, Canada, and is operated by the government of Nunavut.

== Airlines and destinations ==
Airlines	Destinations
Canadian North	Iqaluit, Sanirajak

== Accidents and incidents ==
- On 29 November 1975, a Douglas C-47A C-FOOX of Kenting Atlas Aviation was damaged beyond economic repair at Igloolik Airport.

== Gallery ==
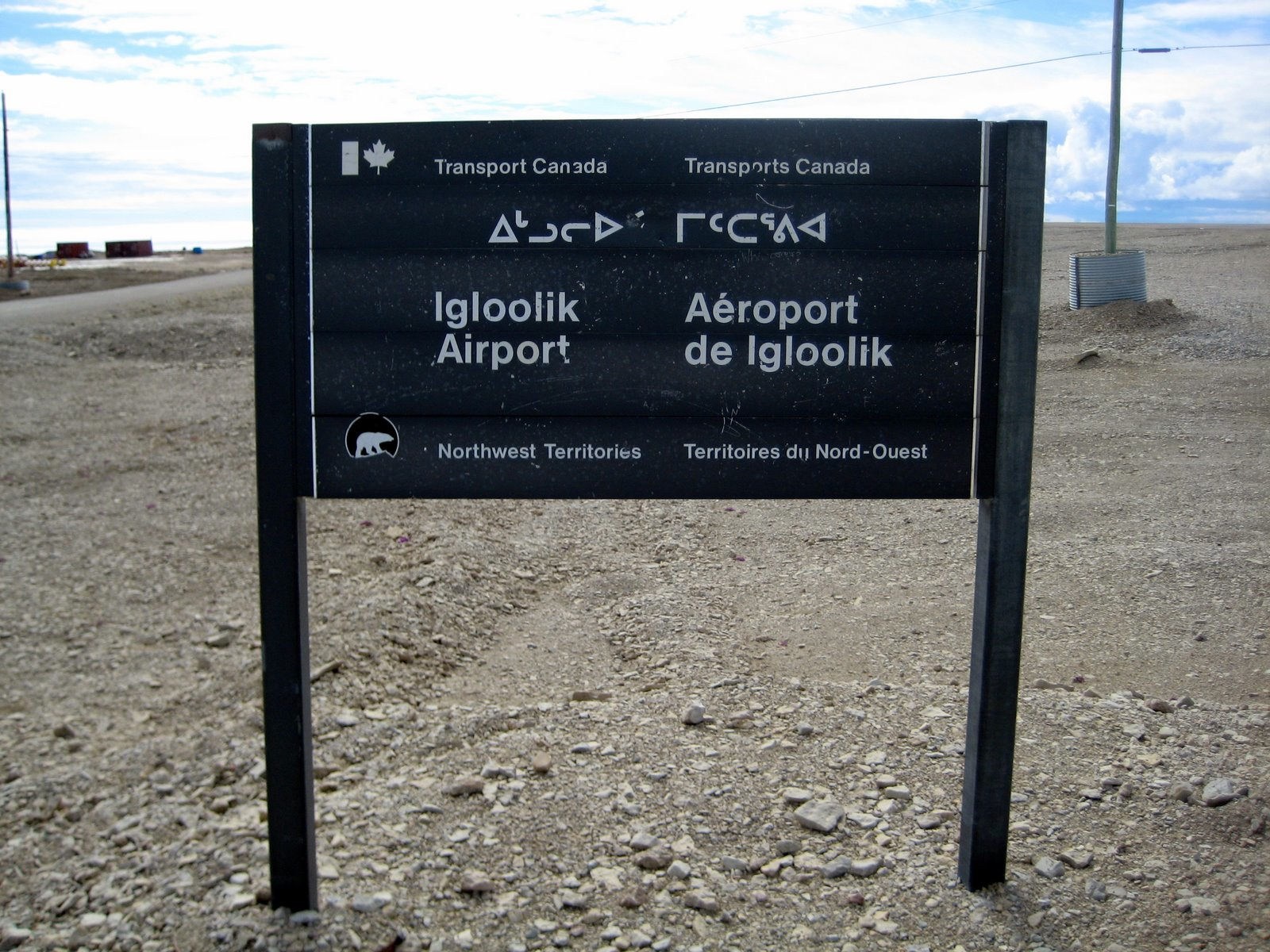
Currently displayed sign. Labelled as an airport of the Northwest Territories as sign predates creation of Nunavut in 1999.

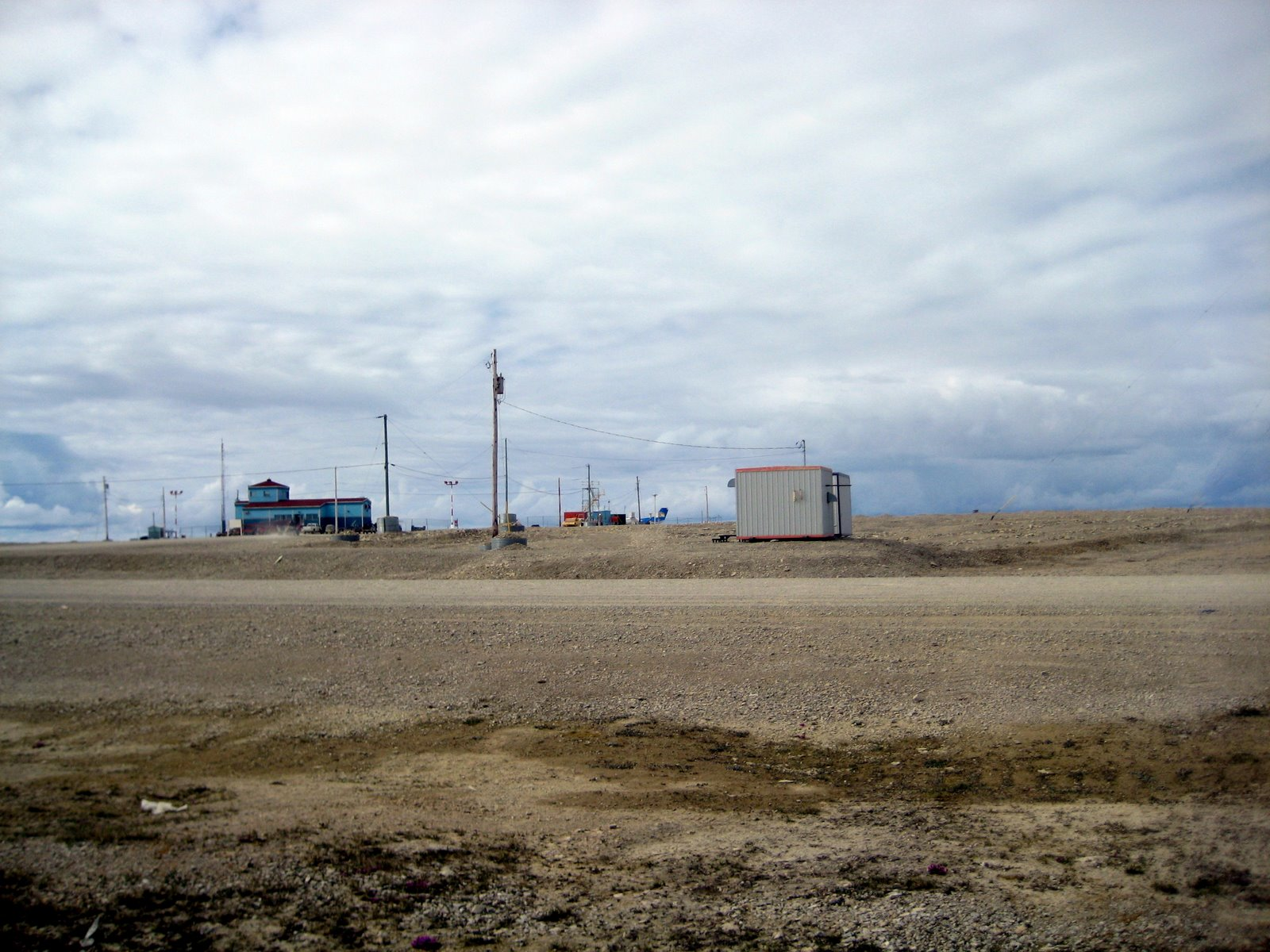
Igloolik Airport at a distance (blue building). A Canadian North airplane arrives, as All-terrain vehicles and trucks drive up to the airport.
