= Alfred Tremblay =

Canadian prospector

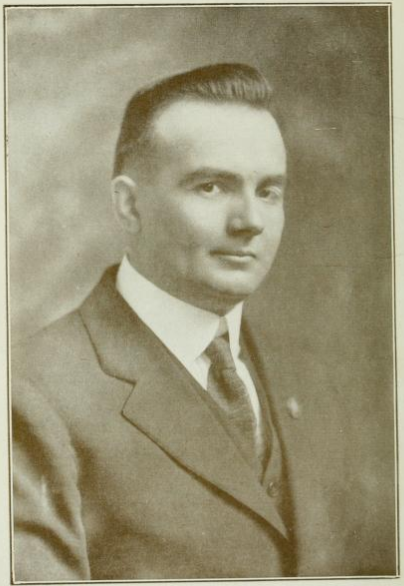
- Died: 1975 (aged 87–88)

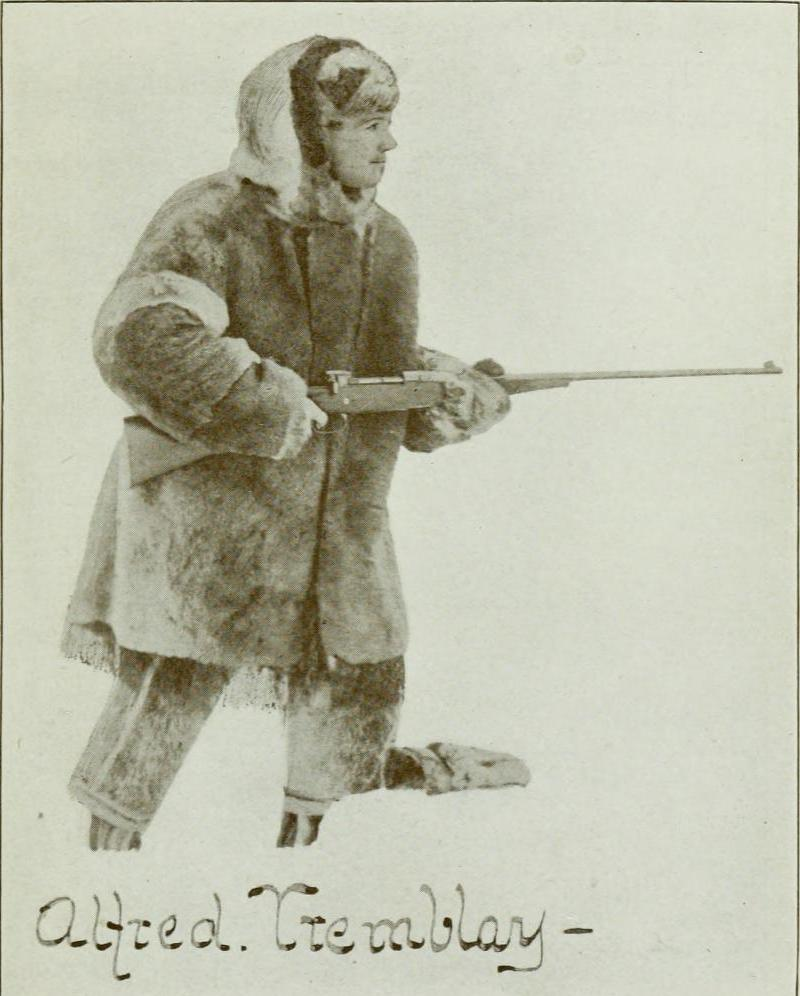
Alfred Tremblay in Arctic gear.

Alfred Tremblay (1887─1975) was a Canadian prospector, explorer and an officer of the Order of Canada.

In 1912 Tremblay was working as a prospector, when he joined an expedition led by J.E. Bernier to Pond Inlet, seeking gold. In 1913 his guides lead him south, to Igloolik. Tremblay published an account of this expedition in 1921. Tremblay would eventually walk a circuit of Baffin Island, a distance of more than 6,400 kilometres (4,000 mi).
