= Germaine Arnaktauyok =

Canadian artist

- Born: 1946 (age 79–80); Maniitsoq, Greenland

The Power of Tunniq, 2006, etching and aquatint. This print illustrates the supposed incredible strength of the Dorset People, who lived in the Canadian arctic before the arrival of the Inuit.

Germaine Arnaktauyok (born in Maniitsoq, Greenland in 1946) is an Inuk printmaker, painter, and drawer originating from the Igloolik area of Nunavut, then the Northwest Territories. Arnaktauyok drew at an early age with any source of paper she could find.

The media she works with consists of lithographs, etchings, and serigraphs that illustrate Inuit myths and traditional ways of life from her past experiences and ancestral culture. Her designs are two-dimensional revealing expressive line work illustrations that indicate personal stories incorporated in the subject of past Inuit tales.

== Family ==
Until the mid 1960s, she lived with her family in a camp inland from the town where seals and caribou were plentiful for hunting. Therese Nattok and Isidore Iytok, the mother and father of Germaine Arnaktauyok, are talented carvers that contributed to the Inuit style of art. Arnaktauyok was the third of eight children. She was the oldest daughter in the family.

== Religion ==
Roman Catholicism and Anglicanism were the two religions that were practised in the Igloolik region. Priests were available in the towns and occasionally visited the camps in order to listen to the community's confessions and provide spiritual support. Arnaktauyok was baptised into the Catholic faith as an infant. In Chesterfield Inlet, she attended a Catholic school when she was nine years old. She stayed here for seven years, only to return to her family each summer, which became lonesome for her in the school season. A nun, who was skilled at painting, recognized her talent and provided lessons for her. Arnaktauyok's painting skills developed and her first artwork was sold at the age of eleven.

== Education ==
Arnaktauyok continued her schooling at a school in Churchill, Manitoba, where she was further encouraged to pursue the art field by George Swinton. In 1967, she took art courses on the weekends in Winnipeg, and a year later she attended the Fine Arts program at the University of Manitoba School of Art. Arnaktauyok then moved to Ottawa to study at the Pembroke Campus of Algonquin College for commercial art in 1969. This particular field was not what she wanted to pursue; however, she did gain experience for creating illustrations in books at the Department of Indian and Northern Affairs. In the same year, she moved to Iqaluit, then called Frobisher Bay, to work for the Frobisher Bay Arts and Crafts Centre, which lasted five years. While working in Iqaluit, Algonquin College in Pembroke offered her a year-long course in the crafts field involving historical and cultural techniques of crafting.

== Career ==
After her education was completed for the time being, Arnaktauyok moved to Yellowknife to work for the Government of the Northwest Territories (GNWT); this was from 1971 to 1976. She was given many commissioned projects for the Department of Education, GNWT.

Her artwork is held in a variety of museums, including the University of Michigan Museum of Art, the Pennsylvania Academy of the Fine Arts, the National Gallery of Canada, the British Museum, the McMaster Museum of Art, and the Peabody Essex Museum. The Winnipeg Art Gallery purchased her prints in 2024.

She created some animations for the 2018 drama film Tia and Piujuq, which also featured a book of her art as a plot point within the story.

== Personal life ==
Arnaktauyok married in 1976, and had her daughter, Amber. The family lived in Langley, British Columbia, and for ten years Arnaktauyok was not actively producing art. She split up with her husband in 1989, and moved back to Yellowknife where she focused on making art. In 1992, she moved back to Iqaluit to study printmaking with Kyra Fischer at Arctic College for a year. Since then, Germaine Arnaktauyok has been actively engaged in creating drawings and etchings that reflect her personal life in historical Inuit narratives.

== Honours and exhibits ==
- Designed the reverse of the two dollar coin issued by the Royal Canadian Mint in 1999 to commemorate the inception of the province of Nunavut.
- Designed a two hundred dollar special edition gold piece issued by the mint in 2000 as part of the Native Cultures and Tradition Series.
- Governor General's Award in Visual and Media Arts (2021)

== Books ==
Germaine is the co-author and illustrator of My Name is Arnaktauyok: The Life and Art of Germaine Arnaktauyok.

She also illustrated the short comic Kiviuq Vs Big Bee. Written by Jose Kusugak and published by Renegade Arts Entertainment in the Arctic Comics anthology in 2016.

Germaine has also illustrated many books including:

- Inuit Spirit: A Colouring Book by Germaine Arnaktauyok
- Those That Cause Fear
- Way Back Then
- Kiviuq's Journey.
