= Toronto International Film Festival Amplify Voices Award =

Film award in Toronto, Canada

The Amplify Voices Award is an annual film award presented by the Toronto International Film Festival. First presented at the 2020 Toronto International Film Festival, the award was originally presented to three films annually, with one award open to all Canadian feature films and designated as the Amplify Voices Award for Best Canadian Film, and two awards presented to films from anywhere in the world directed by filmmakers who are Black, Indigenous or People of Colour. The winners in both the Canadian and BIPOC categories are selected and presented by the same jury.

In 2023, the award's criteria were changed, with the eligibility restricted to Canadian films; one award was presented for Best Film, one award was presented for Best First Film, and a new Trailblazer Award was presented to honour a Canadian BIPOC filmmaker for their overall career. The overall Best Canadian Film award was also split back off from Amplify Voices, returning to its own category.

The award was not presented at the 2024 Toronto International Film Festival, which instead saw a return of the Best Canadian Discovery Award.

As with all of TIFF's juried awards, the jury also have the discretion to name one or more honorable mentions in addition to the overall winners.

== Winners ==
As the award for Best Canadian Film was simply a renaming of TIFF's existing Best Canadian Film award, winners in the Canadian film category are listed in that article; only winners of the BIPOC categories are listed below.

| Year | Film | Director | Ref |
|---|---|---|---|
| 2020 | The Disciple | Chaitanya Tamhane | |
| 2020 | Night of the Kings (La Nuit des Rois) | Philippe Lacôte | |
| 2020 | Downstream to Kinshasa (En route pour le milliard) | Dieudo Hamadi | |
| 2021 | The Gravedigger's Wife | Khadar Ayderus Ahmed | |
| 2021 | A Night of Knowing Nothing | Payal Kapadia | |
| 2022 | Leonor Will Never Die | Martika Ramirez Escobar | |
| 2022 | While We Watched | Vinay Shukla | |
| 2022 | Buffy Sainte-Marie: Carry It On | Madison Thomas | |
| 2023 | Kanaval | Henri Pardo | |
| 2023 | Tautuktavuk (What We See) | Carol Kunnuk, Lucy Tulugarjuk | |

== Trailblazer ==
- 2023 - Damon D'Oliveira
