= Tia and Piujuq =

2018 Canadian drama film

- Inuktitut: ᑏᐊ ᐊᒻᒪᓗ ᐱᐅᔪᖅ
- Directed by: Lucy Tulugarjuk
- Written by: Samuel Cohn-Cousineau; Marie-Hélène Cousineau; Lucy Tulugarjuk
- Produced by: Marie-Hélène Cousineau
- Starring: Tia Bshara; Nuvvija Tulugarjuk
- Cinematography: Edith Labbé; Jonathan Frantz
- Edited by: Jeremiah Hayes
- Music by: Chris Coleman; Celina Kalluk
- Production companies: Sivumu Northern Productions; Arnait Video Productions
- Distributed by: Isuma
- Release date: September 30, 2018
- Running time: 79 minutes
- Country: Canada
- Languages: English; French; Arabic; Inuktitut

Tia and Piujuq (Inuktitut: ᑏᐊ ᐊᒻᒪᓗ ᐱᐅᔪᖅ) is a Canadian family drama film, directed by Lucy Tulugarjuk and released in 2018.

The film stars Tia Bshara as Tia, a young girl who has moved with her family to Montreal as refugees from the Syrian civil war; struggling to adapt or fit in within her new environment, one day she discovers a magic portal which transports her to an Inuit community in the Canadian Arctic, where she meets and befriends Piujuq (Nuvvija Tulugarjuk), an Inuk girl her own age who is also lonely and unhappy as she is spending the summer at an isolated hunting camp with her grandmother (Madeline Ivalu), with their interactions proving healing and transformative for both girls.

The cast also includes Eiman Aljaber, Ghaiss Gharibet, Khaldoun Abdoulmajeed, Nicolas Abrile, Anjo B. Arson, Jacky Qrunnut, Alexandre Apak Cousineau, Kayla Tulugarjuk, Damon Klengenberg, Cham Elhamoud, Jozafin Hazari, Charlotte Cortez-Robitaille, Laurence Guy, Elliott Jenny and Adam Elhamoud.

== Production ==
The film was inspired in part by the art of Germaine Arnaktauyok, both using a book of her art as Tia's key to opening the portal and directly featuring animated sequences created by Arnaktauyok.

Nuvvija Tulugarjuk, who played Piujuq, is Lucy Tulugarjuk's real-life daughter.

The film began production in 2017, with shooting in both Montreal and Igloolik. Lucy Tulugarjuk noted that she saw commonalities between Inuit and Syrian cultures, including the importance of family and the fact that both groups have faced oppression and are commonly misunderstood in the media.

The film features dialogue in English, French, Arabic and Inuktitut.

== Distribution ==
The film premiered on September 30, 2018, at the Carrousel international du film de Rimouski, and was screened at the 2018 ImagineNATIVE Film and Media Arts Festival, before going into limited commercial release in December.

It was screened in 2019 at the Festival du film canadien in Dieppe, France, where it won the award for Best Children's Film.

== Critical response ==
Priscilla Naungagiaq Hensley of Inuit Art Quarterly praised the film's positioning of Inuit culture as a tool of healing and connection, instead of its more typical media depiction as a community marked by damage and pain.

Louise-Maude Rioux Soucy of Le Devoir rated the film three stars, writing that it was uneven and awkward in places, but that it featured moments of poetic beauty in its portrayals of both the multicultural urban streetscape of Montreal and the natural environment of Nunavut.
