= Wrong Husband =

2025 Canadian drama film by Zacharias Kunuk

- Inuktitut: Uiksaringitara
- Directed by: Zacharias Kunuk
- Written by: Zacharias Kunuk; Carol Kunnuk
- Produced by: Jonathan Frantz; Samuel Cohn-Cousineau; Carol Kunnuk
- Starring: Theresia Kappianaq; Haiden Angutimarik; Leah Panimera; Mark Taqqaugaq; Emma Quassa
- Production company: Kingulliit Productions
- Release date: February 16, 2025 (Berlin)
- Running time: 100 minutes
- Country: Canada
- Language: Inuktitut

Wrong Husband (Inuktitut: Uiksaringitara) is a Canadian drama film, directed by Zacharias Kunuk and released in 2025. The film is a historical drama centred on Kaujak (Theresia Kappianaq) and Sapa (Haiden Angutimarik), two young Inuit lovers in Igloolik kept apart by tragic circumstances, who turn to a shaman to help them be together.

Its cast also includes Leah Panimera, Mark Taqqaugaq and Emma Quassa.

The film received funding from Telefilm Canada in 2023, and was shot in Igloolik over the summer and fall that year.

It premiered in the Generation 14+ program at the 75th Berlin International Film Festival. It had its Canadian premiere at the 2025 Toronto International Film Festival, where it won the award for Best Canadian Film.

It was also screened in the Borsos Competition program at the 2025 Whistler Film Festival.

The film was named to TIFF's annual year-end Canada's Top Ten list for 2025.

== Awards ==
Award	Date of ceremony	Category	Recipient	Result	Ref.
Toronto International Film Festival	2025	Best Canadian Film	Zacharias Kunuk	Won	
Whistler Film Festival	2025	Best Direction in a Borsos Competition Film	Zacharias Kunuk	Won	
Vancouver Film Critics Circle	2025	Best Canadian Film	Wrong Husband	Nominated	
Vancouver Film Critics Circle	2025	Best Director of a Canadian Film	Zacharias Kunuk	Nominated	
Canadian Screen Awards	2026	Best Picture	Samuel Cohn-Cousineau, Jonathan Frantz	Nominated	
Canadian Screen Awards	2026	Best Direction	Zacharias Kunuk	Nominated	
Canadian Screen Awards	2026	Best Lead Performance in a Drama Film	Theresia Kappianaq	Nominated	
Canadian Screen Awards	2026	Best Supporting Performance in a Drama Film	Leah Panimera	Nominated	
