= Paul Apak Angilirq =

Canadian screenwriter and film producer

Paul Apak Angilirq (1954–1998) was a Canadian film producer and screenwriter. A cofounder and vice-president of Isuma, Canada's first Inuit media production firm, he was producer and writer of the company's 2001 feature film Atanarjuat: The Fast Runner. Prior to co-founding Isuma with Norman Cohn and Zacharias Kunuk, he was an employee of the Inuit Broadcasting Corporation. During his career with Isuma, he made the short films The Qidlarsuaaq Expedition and Through Eskimo Country.

He wrote the screenplay for Atanarjuat, but died of cancer in 1998 before the film was completed. After the film was released in 2001, he posthumously won the Genie Award for Best Screenplay at the 22nd Genie Awards, and the film was named Best Picture.
