= The Journals of Knud Rasmussen =

- DVD cover
- Directed by: Zacharias Kunuk; Norman Cohn
- Written by: Eugene Ipkarnak; Madeline Ivalu; Herve Paniaq; Pauloosie Qulitalik; Lucy Tulugarjuk; Abraham Ulayuruluk; Louis Uttak
- Produced by: Lucius Barre; Norman Cohn; Zacharias Kunuk; Elise Lund Larsen; Stéphane Rituit; Vibeke Vogel
- Starring: Natar Ungalaaq; Pierre Lebeau; Leah Angutimarik; Jens Jørn Spottag; Neeve Irngaut
- Cinematography: Norman Cohn
- Edited by: Cathrine Ambus; Norman Cohn; Félix Lajeunesse
- Music by: Richard Lavoie
- Distributed by: Alliance Atlantis; SF Film
- Release dates: March 11, 2006 (Igloolik); September 7, 2006 (TIFF); October 8, 2006 (U.S.); November 10, 2006 (Denmark)
- Running time: 112 minutes
- Countries: Canada; Denmark
- Languages: Inuktitut; Danish; English
- Budget: $6,300,000 (estimated)

The Journals of Knud Rasmussen is a 2006 Canadian-Danish film directed by Zacharias Kunuk and Norman Cohn. The film is about the pressures on traditional Inuit shamanistic beliefs as documented by Knud Rasmussen during his travels across the Canadian Arctic in the 1920s.

Produced by Isuma, the film premiered on September 7, 2006 as the opening film of the Toronto International Film Festival, after pre-release screenings in Inuit communities in Canada and Greenland.

== Synopsis ==
Set primarily in and around Igloolik in 1922, the film depicts the encounter between a group of Inuit in Arctic Canada led by one of the last shamans of the Canadian Inuit, Aua, and three Danish ethnographers and explorers, Knud Rasmussen, Therkel Mathiassen and Peter Freuchen during the latter's "Great Sled Journey" of 1922. The film is shot from the perspective of the Inuit, showing their traditional beliefs and lifestyle. The shaman and his entourage must ultimately decide whether to join the ranks of another group of Inuit who have converted to Christianity.

== Awards ==
Michelline Amaaq received a Genie Award nomination for Best Costume Design at the 27th Genie Awards in 2007.

The film was a nominee for the Rogers Best Canadian Film Award at the Toronto Film Critics Association Awards 2006, and was named to TIFF's annual year-end Canada's Top Ten list for 2006.
