= Uvagut TV =

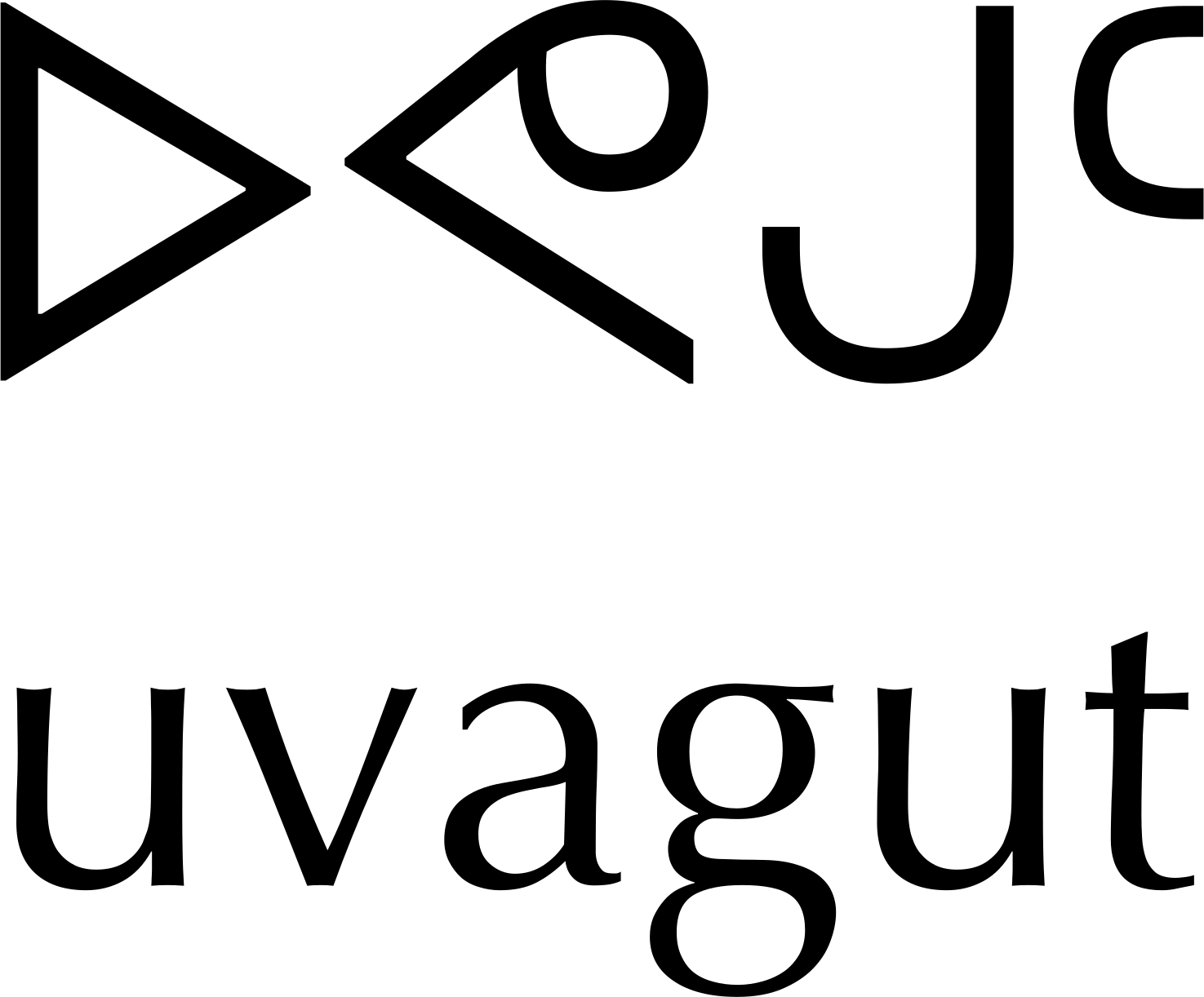
- Uvagut TV logo
- Country: Canada
- Broadcast area: National

Ownership
- Owner: Nunavut Independent Television Network

History
- Launched: January 18, 2021

Links
- Website: uvagut.tv

Uvagut TV (Inuktitut: ᐅᕙᒍᑦ, lit. 'our TV') is a Canadian Inuktitut-language specialty channel. Owned by the Nunavut Independent Television Network, the channel primarily carries cultural, public affairs, and entertainment programming highlighting Inuit communities.

== History ==
The channel launched on January 18, 2021 as a licence-exempt service, initially on Arctic Co-op Cable in Nunavut and the Northwest Territories, as well as nationally by Shaw Direct, and streaming online. Its owner, the Nunavut Independent Television Network (NITN), had previously distributed programming via community television.

NITN executive director Lucy Tulugarjuk explained that the channel was meant as a means to preserve the culture and languages of Inuit for future generations (including, in particular, the endangered dialects of Inuinnaqtun and Inuvialuktun). Uvagut TV was promoted as being the first specialty channel in Canada to broadcast programming exclusively in Indigenous languages; the Aboriginal Peoples Television Network (APTN) has carried programming in Indigenous languages—including Inuktut—but it was initially mixed with English- and French-language Indigenous programming on its schedule until 2024.

On October 22, 2024, the Canadian Radio-television and Telecommunications Commission (CRTC) approved NITN's application for a discretionary service license for Uvagut TV. The Commission also approved the channel's request for a 9.1 (1)(h) must-carry order, mandating that it be carried by the lowest tier of service by all Canadian television providers effective January 20, 2025 for a five-year term. The channel is charging a per-subscriber fee of 9¢ per month.

== Programming ==
The channel primarily carries programming highlighting Inuit communities, including cultural, historical, and public affairs programs, and entertainment such as Inuktitut-language films and children's programming. At launch, Uvagut TV partnered with the Inuit Broadcasting Corporation, Isuma, and Taqqut Productions to produce or provide programming for the service, with IBC's content drawing primarily from its library and archives.

In 2023, Uvagut TV partnered with The Weather Network to produce weather forecasts for the Inuit Nunangat regions, which are carried throughout the day by the channel. The three-minute forecasts are tailored for Nunavut, Nunavik, the Inuvialuit Settlement Region, and Nunatsiavut, and presented in their local dialects; efforts were taken to adapt the forecasts to the needs of these communities, and to adapt weather terminology for their respective dialects.
