= Atanarjuat: The Fast Runner =

2001 film by Zacharias Kunuk

- Inuktitut: ᐊᑕᓈᕐᔪᐊᑦ
- Directed by: Zacharias Kunuk
- Written by: Paul Apak Angilirq
- Produced by: Paul Apak Angilirq; Norman Cohn; Zacharias Kunuk; Germaine Wong
- Starring: Natar Ungalaaq; Sylvia Ivalu; Peter-Henry Arnatsiaq; Lucy Tulugarjuk
- Cinematography: Norman Cohn
- Edited by: Norman Cohn; Zacharias Kunuk; Marie-Christine Sarda
- Music by: Chris Crilly
- Distributed by: Odeon Films
- Release dates: 13 May 2001 (Cannes premiere); 12 April 2002 (Canada)
- Running time: 172 minutes
- Country: Canada
- Language: Inuktitut
- Budget: CA$1.9 million
- Box office: $5.9 million

Atanarjuat: The Fast Runner (Inuktitut: ᐊᑕᓈᕐᔪᐊᑦ) is a 2001 Canadian epic film directed by Inuk filmmaker Zacharias Kunuk and produced by his company Isuma Igloolik Productions. It was the first feature film ever to be written, directed and acted entirely in the Inuktitut language.

Set in the ancient past, the film retells an Inuit legend passed down through centuries of oral tradition. It revolves around the title character, whose marriage with his two wives earns him the animosity of the son of the band leader, who kills Atanarjuat's brother and forces Atanarjuat to flee by foot.

The film premiered at the 54th Cannes Film Festival in May 2001, and was released in Canada on 12 April 2002. A major critical success, Atanarjuat won the Caméra d'Or (Golden Camera) at Cannes, and six Genie Awards, including Best Motion Picture. Atanarjuat was also a commercial success, becoming Canada's top-grossing release of 2002, outperforming the mainstream comedy Men with Brooms. It grossed more than US$5 million worldwide. In 2015, a poll of filmmakers and critics in the Toronto International Film Festival named it the greatest Canadian film of all time. It also topped the CBC's 2023 list of The 50 Greatest Films Directed by Canadians. The film was selected as the Canadian entry for the Best Foreign Language Film at the 74th Academy Awards, but was not accepted as a nominee.

== Plot ==
At Igloolik ("place of houses") in the Eastern Arctic wilderness at the dawn of the first millennium, Qulitalik bids goodbye to his sister Panikpak, wife of Kumaglak, promising to come if she calls for help in her heart. She gives him her husband's rabbit's foot for spiritual power.

In a flashback, the community is visited by the strange shaman Tungajuaq. During a spiritual duel with the visitor, the camp leader Kumaglak dies. The visitor removes the walrus-tooth necklace from Kumaglak's body, and puts the necklace around the neck of Kumaglak's son Sauri, who thus becomes camp leader. Much later, the shaman's magic has poisoned the community with hatred. Tulimaq, the laughing stock of the camp, is having bad luck hunting and can barely feed his family. However, Panikpak brings meat for Tulimaq's children, Atanarjuat and Amaqjuaq, hoping that one day they will make things right.

Atanarjuat grows up to be a fast runner, Amaqjuaq is strong, and they are rivals with Sauri and his son Oki. During a game of "wolf tag", Atanarjuat pursues the beautiful Atuat, provoking jealousy in Oki, to whom she was betrothed. Oki's sister Puja also shows interest in Atanarjuat. In a punching duel with Oki, Atanarjuat wins the right to marry Atuat. Later, Atanarjuat leaves his wife Atuat at a camp to hunt caribou. However, he stops at Sauri's camp, where he is persuaded to take Puja on the hunt. Camping by a lake, Atanarjuat and Puja sing, flirt, and have sex.

Later, Atanarjuat is in an unhappy marriage with Atuat and Puja. He catches his brother having sex with Puja and strikes Puja. She runs to Sauri's camp and tells them that Atanarjuat tried to kill her, so Sauri and Oki decide to kill Atanarjuat; Panikpak, however, remains skeptical of Puja's accusations. Puja returns to Atanarjuat's camp apologizing, and is accepted back. One day the women decide to go find eggs, but first Puja places a boot outside the tent where the men are resting. Oki and two henchmen sneak up and plunge their spears through the tent wall. Amaqjuaq is killed, but Oki is startled by a vision of his grandfather Kumaglak, and Atanarjuat, naked and barefoot, bursts out of the tent and runs for miles across the ice, pursued by Oki's gang. Atanarjuat escapes by following a vision of Qulitalik and jumping a wide open crack in the ice. Eventually he collapses in exhaustion with bloody feet. He is rescued by Qulitalik and his family, who conceal him when Oki arrives in pursuit.

Back at Igloolik, Sauri refuses to let Oki have Atuat, but Oki rapes Atuat, who is comforted by Panikpak. During a hunt, Oki stabs Sauri and claims it was an accident, and takes over as camp leader. In her heart, Panikpak summons her brother Qulitalik to come, as they agreed years ago. Qulitalik feels her call and makes magic with the rabbit foot: at Igloolik Oki catches a rabbit with his bare hands, eats it, and falls under a spell that makes him forget his grievances. Qulitalik and the family make the long sled journey back to Igloolik with Atanarjuat, who has healed. Atanarjuat is joyfully reunited with Atuat but rejects Puja. The spell-happy Oki just wants to have a feast. But Atanarjuat prepares an ice floor in an igloo and invites Oki and his brothers inside. He slips antlers on his feet to grip the ice and subdues them, declaring that the killing is over. It is now time to confront the evil that has plagued the community for so long. With everyone gathered together, Qulitalik calls forth the spirits, and the evil shaman Tungajuaq appears, grunting like a polar bear. Qulitalik confronts the shaman with the powerful spirit of the walrus and magic soil, Panikpak shakes the walrus tooth necklace, and the shaman is destroyed and vanishes. Panikpak tells the group it is time for forgiveness: Oki, Puja and their friends are forgiven for their evil deeds, but are exiled from Igloolik forever.

== Cast ==
=== Atanarjuat's family ===
- Natar Ungalaaq as Atanarjuat, "the fast runner"
- Pakak Innuksuk as Amaqjuaq, "the strong one", Atanarjuat's older brother
- Neeve Irngaut as Uluriaq, wife of Amaqjuaq
- Felix Alaralak as Tulimaq, Atanarjuat's father
  - Stephen Qrunnut as Young Tulimaq
- Kumaglaq, the young son of Atanarjuat and Atuat; namesake of the old camp leader.

=== Oki's family ===
- Peter-Henry Arnatsiaq as Oki, Atanarjuat's rival
- Lucy Tulugarjuk as Puja, Oki's spoiled sister
- Apayata Kotierk as Kumaglak, the old camp leader
- Madeline Ivalu as Panikpak, wife of Kumaglak, mother of Sauri, grandmother of Oki and Puja, and sister of Qulitalik
  - Mary Angutautuk as Young Panikpak
- Pauloosie Qulitalik as Qulitalik, brother of Panikpak
  - Charlie Qulitalik as Young Qulitalik
- Mary Qulitalik as Niriuniq, wife of Qulitalik
- Eugene Ipkarnak as Sauri, camp leader
  - Eric Nutarariaq as Young Sauri

=== Others ===
- Sylvia Ivalu as Atuat, sought as a wife by Atanarjuat and Oki
- Abraham Ulayuruluk as Tungajuaq, the evil shaman
- Luke Taqqaugaq as Pittiulak, Oki's sidekick
- Alex Uttak as Pakak, Oki's sidekick

== Production ==
=== Development ===
The film is set in Igloolik ("place of houses") in the Eastern Arctic wilderness at the dawn of the first millennium. The names of Atanarjuat and his brother first appeared in writing in the journals of the explorer Captain George Lyon, who took part in a British expedition to search for the Northwest Passage in 1821–23. The Inuit believe the story of Atanarjuat to be more than five centuries old. This agrees with geomorphological estimates that Qikiqtaarjuk (Herschel Island), Inuktitut for little island and now a peninsula of Igloolik Island, on which much of the action occurs, became a peninsula about 500 years ago due to isostatic rebound. The main elements of the original story are that two brothers are betrayed by their wives and help set up a sneak attack. Rivals plunge their spears through the walls of the brothers' tent, but the fast runner makes an escape across the ice, naked and barefoot. After being rescued and healing, the fast runner sets up his own ambush and succeeds in killing his rivals. It was the first Inuktitut-language screenplay, and the project became the first feature film in Inuktitut.

Writer Paul Apak Angilirq, director Zacharias Kunuk, and many others on the production team had heard the Atanarjuat legend when they were young. Over the course of five years, Angilirq interviewed seven elders for their versions of the story and combined them into one treatment. The final script was developed by the team of Angilirq, Norman Cohn (producer and cinematographer), Kunuk, Herve Paniaq (tribal elder), and Pauloosie Qulitalik. Angilirq died due to cancer during film production in 1998.

Despite the emphasis on accuracy, the film takes liberties with the original Inuit myth: "At the film's core is a crucial lie", wrote Justin Shubow in The American Prospect, which is that the original legend ended in a revenge killing, whereas in the film Atanarjuat stops short of shedding blood. Kunuk felt this was "A message more fitting for our times", and agreed that it "probably" reflected the influence of Christianity and its concept of forgiveness on contemporary Inuit.

After Isuma applied to Telefilm Canada in spring 1998 for financial support, plans were made to begin filming in Igloolik, Nunavut in April. The month was important because April is typically the only time of year in Northern Canada when camera equipment could film winter scenes without malfunctioning due to cold. Kunuk found there was a lack of funding available from Telefilm and the Canadian government, which prioritized English and French-language productions over the languages of Aboriginal Peoples in Canada, and would not provide more than $100,000 for a film in an Aboriginal language, which would make Atanarjuat impossible. Kunuk regarded this as racial discrimination.

Due to difficulty with funding, Isuma instead successfully appealed for support of the National Film Board of Canada. Although the NFB had abandoned fiction, Isuma argued that in documenting Inuit mythology, Atanarjuat was similar to a documentary film. The budget was approved at $1.96 million.

=== Filming ===
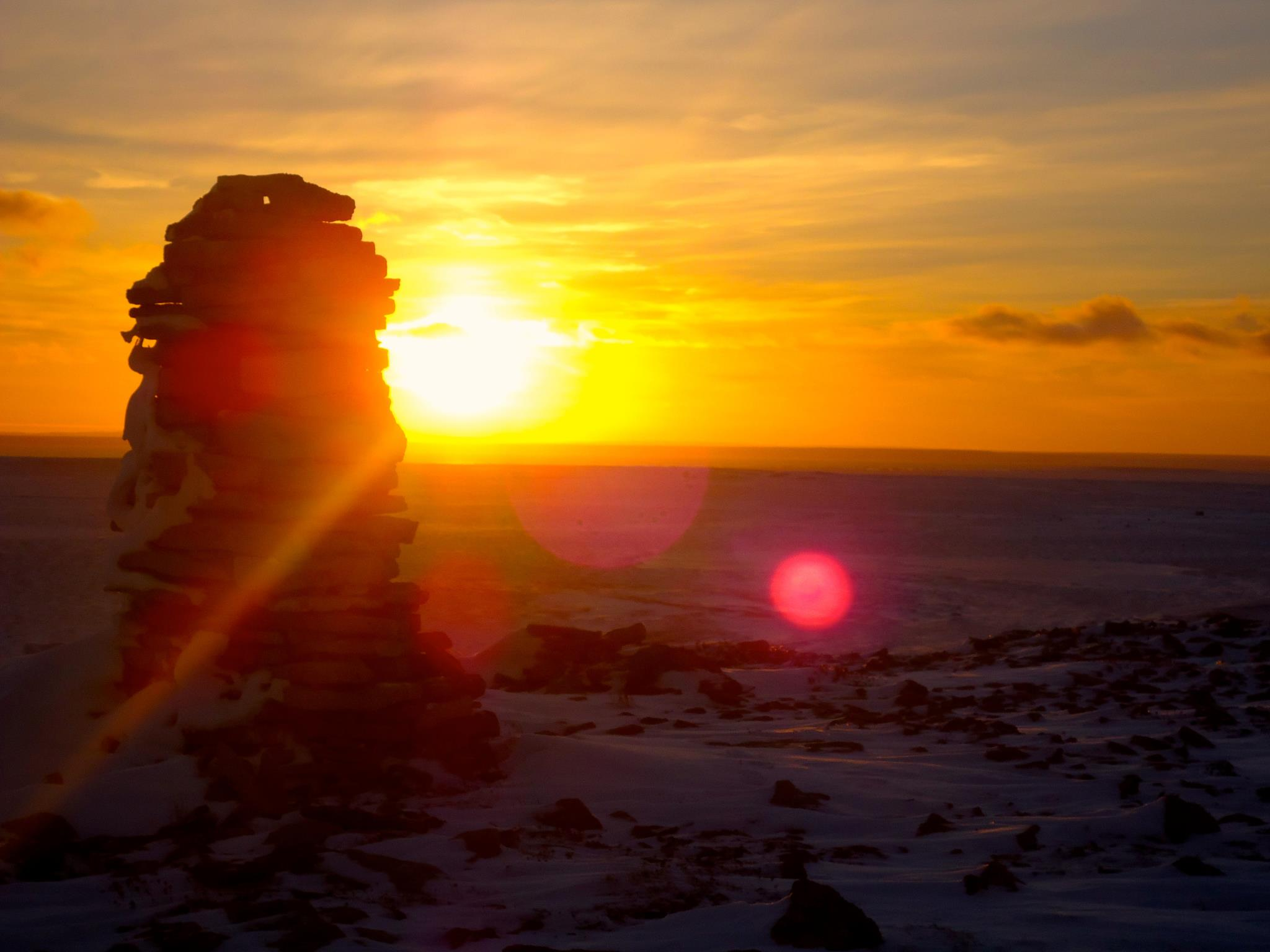
Filming took place in Igloolik, Nunavut.

Achieving historical accuracy was paramount to the production. According to anthropologist Bernard Saladin d'Anglure the biggest challenge was resurrecting the beliefs and practice of shamanism, "the major frame of reference for Inuit life". Research into historical sources—often the journals of European explorers—provided the basis for the reconstruction of clothes and customs. Elders were consulted. In an interview, Paul Apak Angilirq said:

We go to the elders and ask information about the old ways, about religion, about things that a lot of people have no remembrance of now... They are helping us write down what people would have said and acted in the past, and what the dialogue would have been like ... We speak 'baby talk' compared to the elders. But for Atanarjuat, we want people speaking real Inuktitut ... When we are writing the script, they might jump in and say, 'Oh, we wouldn't say such a word to our in-law! We wouldn't say anything to our brother's wives! It was against the law!'"

The filming crew was 90% Inuit. Filming began in 1999, stretching from 3 p.m. to 3 a.m., given the sun was always up. Cohn used natural light in shooting with his Sony DVW 700 digital camera, avoiding switches from the automatic camera settings. The film production pumped more than $1.5 million into the local economy of Igloolik and employed about 60 people. Given the small population, everyone in Igloolik knew at least one crew member.

Kunuk explained how the crew set out:

Everything was different—the way we traveled, the way we camped. It was just like when we go out today, spring camping, putting up canvas tents and moving from here to there. We would go fifty miles out into the country where there were no roads, nothing. Like the land was from the time it was created. There would be fifteen tents and eighty people, all the kids running around, just waiting for a perfect day. When we had a perfect day, the actors put on their make-up and costumes, and we went onto the site where we wanted to shoot.

The crew would costume the actors and apply make-up, only for the production to stall for four hours for ideal weather, which Kunuk said required the patience found in Inuit hunting.

== Release ==
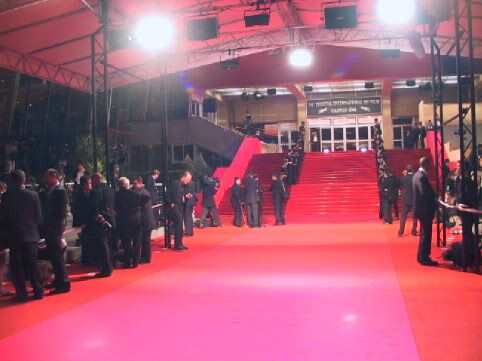
The Cannes Film Festival in May 2001.

The film premiered at the Cannes Film Festival in May 2001. It was also screened at the Toronto International Film Festival in September 2001.

Its commercial release in Canada came on 12 April 2002, with the only bidder for distribution rights being Alliance Atlantis and its affiliate, Odeon Films. It had already been playing in France for seven weeks, and was on 83 screens. The film opened in New York City on 7 June 2002.

== Reception and legacy ==
=== Box office ===
In the Greater Toronto Area, the film competed with the Canadian comedy Men with Brooms, which set box office records among English Canadian cinema. Atanarjuat became more enduring in the box office and became one of the highest-grossing Canadian films to date.

By 7 November 2002, Atanarjuat grossed $1.1 million in Canada, with Odeon Films spokesman Mark Slone declaring this "an unqualified hit". In the U.S., it grossed $1.75 million by 11 July 2002. In France, it drew 200,000 admissions before the commercial Canadian release in April 2002. Its gross was higher than any Canadian film of 2002. The film finished its run on 30 January 2003 having grossed $3,789,952 in North America and $1,398,337 in other territories, for a worldwide total of $5,188,289.

=== Critical reception ===
Atanarjuat: The Fast Runner was praised by critics. On Rotten Tomatoes, the film has a positive 93% rating based on 133 reviews, with an average rating of 8.1/10. The site's consensus reads, "Compelling human drama and stunning cinematography make The Fast Runner an absorbing experience". On Metacritic the film has a score of 91 out of 100 based on 29 critics.

Brian D. Johnson of Maclean's hailed it as a masterpiece and a landmark in international film, writing, "This movie doesn't just transport you to another world; it creates its own sense of time and space." In the Toronto Star, Peter Howell wrote the film overcame the stereotypes of the 1922 film Nanook of the North and "defines an epic in every way".

Roger Ebert from Chicago Sun-Times awarded it four out of four, praising the film's acting, fleshed out characters, and direction, calling it "passion, filtered through ritual and memory". Peter Bradshaw from The Guardian praised the performances and cinematography, calling it "a remarkable world first". Tom Dawson from BBC called the film "an impressively vivid and detailed depiction of a particular way of life", hailing the cinematography as "extraordinary". A. O. Scott from The New York Times praised the film, stating "Mr. Kunuk has accomplished the remarkable feat of endowing characters from an old folk tale with complicated psychological motives and responses. The combination of dramatic realism and archaic grandeur is irresistibly powerful". Marjorie Baumgarten from The Austin Chronicle complimented the film's script, cinematography, and visual style as being unique and refreshing. Leonard Maltin awarded the film four stars, calling it "A privileged peek into Inuit culture and a stirring, deeply personal drama".

The goals of the film were first to show how for thousands of years Inuit communities had survived and thrived in the Arctic, and second to introduce the new storytelling medium of film to help Inuit communities survive long into the future. Doug Alexander wrote in the Canadian historical magazine The Beaver that Atanarjuat "is an important step for an indigenous people who have, until recently, seen their culture recorded by outsiders". Jennifer L. Gauthier of CineAction wrote "Atanarjuat was made primarily for Inuit audiences so that they could see positive and accurate images of themselves on the screen". Director Kunuk put it a little more bluntly: "Four thousand years of oral history silenced by fifty years of priests, schools, and cable TV". He explained, "I first heard the story of Atanarjuat from my mother". "Kids all over Nunavut are playing Atanarjuat in the streets," said producer Norman Cohn in a 2002 interview. At one point the production company was considering making Atanarjuat action figures.

In 2004, critics and filmmakers in the Toronto International Film Festival named the film fifth in the Top 10 Canadian Films of All Time. In the next update in 2015, it was placed first, prompting Steve Gravestock to comment, "This is likely the first time that a film by an indigenous filmmaker has topped a poll of national cinema." The Nunatsiaq News heralded the choice as a sign Atanarjuat: The Fast Runner "has stood the test of time". However, Eric Moreault, writing for La Presse, dismissed Atanarjuat's first-place finish as nonsensical, noting Mon oncle Antoine topped all previous versions.

=== Accolades ===
The film won the Caméra d'Or at Cannes, the first time a Canadian film won the honour. Canadian historian George Melnyk interpreted this as a sign that "Canadian cinema has come of global age", also pointing to The Barbarian Invasions winning the Academy Award for Best Foreign Language Film. At the 22nd Genie Awards, Krista Uttak accepted the Award for Best Screenplay on behalf of her deceased father Paul Apak Angilirq.

Canada submitted Atanarjuat for consideration for the Academy Award for Best Foreign Language Film. It was one of the rare Canadian films not in French submitted for consideration, with The Necessities of Life in 2008 also containing a substantial amount of Inuktitut. Atanarjuat was not nominated.

| Award | Date of ceremony | Category | Recipient(s) | Result | Ref(s) |
|---|---|---|---|---|---|
| American Indian Film Festival | 2002 | Best Film | Zacharias Kunuk | Won | |
| American Indian Film Festival | 2002 | Best Director | Zacharias Kunuk | Won | |
| American Indian Film Festival | 2002 | Best Actor | Natar Ungalaaq | Won | |
| American Indian Film Festival | 2002 | Best Actress | Lucy Tulugarjuk | Won | |
| Banff Mountain Film Festival | 2002 | Best Feature Film | Zacharias Kunuk | Won | |
| Cannes Film Festival | 14–25 May 2001 | Caméra d'Or | Zacharias Kunuk | Won | |
| Chicago Film Critics Association | 8 January 2003 | Best Foreign Language Film | Zacharias Kunuk | Nominated | |
| Chicago Film Critics Association | 8 January 2003 | Most Promising Director | Zacharias Kunuk | Nominated | |
| Edinburgh International Film Festival | 2001 | New Director's Award | Zacharias Kunuk | Won (Note: Shared with L.I.E.) | |
| Festival International de Films de Montréal | 2001 | Prix du Public | Zacharias Kunuk | Won | |
| Festival International de Films de Montréal | 2002 | Special Jury Prize | Zacharias Kunuk | Won | |
| Film Fest Gent | 2001 | Grand Prix | Zacharias Kunuk | Won | |
| Film Fest Gent | 2001 | FIPRESCI Prize - Special Mention | Zacharias Kunuk | Won | |
| Genie Awards | 7 February 2002 | Best Motion Picture | Norman Cohn, Paul Apak Angilirq, Zacharias Kunuk and Germaine Wong | Won | |
| Genie Awards | 7 February 2002 | Best Direction | Zacharias Kunuk | Won | |
| Genie Awards | 7 February 2002 | Best Screenplay | Paul Apak Angilirq | Won | |
| Genie Awards | 7 February 2002 | Best Editing | Norman Cohn, Zacharias Kunuk and Marie-Christine Sarda | Won | |
| Genie Awards | 7 February 2002 | Best Original Score | Chris Crilly | Won | |
| Genie Awards | 7 February 2002 | Best Sound | Richard Lavoie, Serge Boivin and Jean Paul Vialard | Nominated | |
| Genie Awards | 7 February 2002 | Best Costume Design | Atuat Akkitirq | Nominated | |
| Genie Awards | 7 February 2002 | Claude Jutra Award | Zacharias Kunuk | Won | |
| Independent Spirit Awards | 22 March 2003 | Best Foreign Film | Zacharias Kunuk | Nominated | |
| San Diego Film Festival | 2002 | Best Feature Film | Zacharias Kunuk | Won | |
| Santa Fe Film Festival | 2002 | Best Feature | Zacharias Kunuk | Won | |
| Toronto Film Critics Association | 18 December 2002 | Best Canadian Film | Zacharias Kunuk | Won | |
| Toronto Film Critics Association | 18 December 2002 | Best First Feature | Zacharias Kunuk | Won | |
| Toronto International Film Festival | 6–15 September 2001 | Best Canadian Film | Zacharias Kunuk | Won | |

== See also ==
- Indigenous peoples in Northern Canada
- List of submissions to the 74th Academy Awards for Best Foreign Language Film
- List of Canadian submissions for the Academy Award for Best Foreign Language Film
