= Norman Cohn (film producer) =

Norman Cohn (born October 6, 1946) is a U.S.-born Canadian film director, producer, cinematographer and editor best known for his work on films Atanarjuat: The Fast Runner and The Journals of Knud Rasmussen.

Born in New York City, New York, United States, Cohn has lived most of his life in Igloolik, Nunavut and Montreal, Quebec, Canada.

Along with director Zacharias Kunuk, he co-founded the first Inuit owned (75%) production company, Isuma and is the secretary-treasurer. In filming Atanarjuat in Igloolik, Cohn used natural light in shooting with his Sony DVW 700 digital camera, avoiding switches from the automatic camera settings. He also edited the film with Kunuk and Marie-Christine Sarda, sharing the Genie Award for Best Editing. With Kunuk and director Natar Ungalaaq, Cohn also helped develop the screenplay for the 2016 film Searchers.

Samuel Cohn-Cousineau, his son with Marie-Hélène Cousineau, is also a screenwriter and film producer, whose work has included collaborations with his mother on Tia and Piujuq and with Kunuk on Wrong Husband (Uiksaringitara).
