= Isuma =

Production company

Igloolik Isuma Productions
- Industry: Production company
- Founded: 1990
- Founder: Zacharias Kunuk, Norman Cohn, Paul Apak Angilirq, Pauloosie Qulitalik
- Headquarters: Igloolik, Igloolik, Nunavut, Canada
- Number of locations: Montreal, Quebec, Canada
- Key people: Zacharias Kunuk (president), Norman Cohn (secretary-treasurer)
- Products: Films
- Website: www.isuma.tv

Isuma (Inuktitut syllabics, ᐃᓱᒪ; Inuktituk for 'to think') is a Canadian film production company and artist collective based in Igloolik, Nunavut. Co-founded by Zacharias Kunuk, Norman Cohn, Paul Apak Angilirq, and Pauloosie Qulitalik in Igloolik in 1990, it is the first Inuit-owned (75%) production company in Canada. Known internationally for its award-winning film, Atanarjuat: The Fast Runner, the first feature film ever to be written, directed and acted entirely in the Inuktitut language, Isuma was selected to represent Canada at the 2019 Venice Biennale where they screened the film One Day in the Life of Noah Piugattuk, the first presentation of art by Inuit creators in the Canada Pavilion.

Isuma focuses on bringing people of multiple age ranges, cultural backgrounds, and belief systems together to support and promote Canada's indigenous community through television, the Internet and film. Isuma's mission is to produce independent, community-based media aimed to preserve and enhance Inuit culture and language; to create jobs and economic development in Igloolik and Nunavut; and to tell authentic Inuit stories to Inuit and non-Inuit audiences worldwide. Isuma is connected to Arnait Video Productions.

== History ==
In 1999, the company filmed and produced the historical epic Atanarjuat: The Fast Runner. It was a box-office success around the world, and won the Caméra d'Or for Best First Feature Film at the 2001 Cannes Film Festival, five Genie Awards (including Best Picture), and several other international film awards. The film had its Canadian premiere at the Toronto International Film Festival in 2001.

The massive critical success of Atanarjuat led to funding from Telefilm Canada, enabling Isuma to begin development on multiple scripts. One of these, The Journals of Knud Rasmussen, about the switch from shamanism to Christianity in Igloolik in the early 1920s, opened the Toronto International Film Festival in 2006.

In 2011, Igloolik Isuma Productions filed for receivership, citing $750,000 in debts, including $500,000 to Atuqtuarvik Corp. of Rankin Inlet. A Montreal-based receiver, RSM Richter, put the company’s assets—most notably its film library—up for sale. The company reformed as Kingulliit Productions.

Isuma aims to increase awareness and focus about and for indigenous peoples of all cultures, not just Northern Canada, through encouraging multimedia approaches. Their goal is to ensure that these rights are not compartmentalized, but rather include the awareness of human rights in a larger cultural and holistic context: through exploration of spirituality, globalization, environmentalism, cinema, world media, and Native awareness.

=== Reception ===
In the 1990s, films were shown locally and then broadcast across the Arctic on Television Northern Canada (TVNC), and Aboriginal People's Television Network (APTN), which began in 1999 and broadcast the series as part of its original programming shown across all parts of Canada. Eventually, the individual films, as well as the Nunavut series, achieved worldwide recognition and acclaim, winning awards in Canada, France, Peru, the United States, Spain, Taiwan, and Japan.

As Canada's first Inuit independent production company, Isuma claims to create a distinctive Inuit style of community-based filmmaking that preserves and enhances Inuit culture, create employment, and offers a uniquely Inuit point of view to the global media audience.

Isuma's goal is to delight other Inuit, and to connect with a global media audience. Isuma's videos, films, and internet projects demonstrate how a community can appropriate communication tools to serve their own cultural, aesthetic, and linguistic purposes. These audiovisual representations also enable Canadians to connect more directly with the images and their Inuit creators, and to establish a distinct and authentic Inuit voice within a global media discourse.

== Importance of visual sovereignty in Igloolik Isuma film ==
Narratives in Inuit culture are largely communicated through visual and oral tradition. For this reason, many attempts to translate these Inuit stories into written language that are not done by indigenous peoples are not always a proper portrayal of indigenous people. These translations outside of indigenous cultures can often become misinterpreted, incorrect, or blinded by stereotypes created by colonialism. Ideas of visual sovereignty (a way of reimagining Native-centered articulations of self-representation and autonomy that engage the powerful ideologies of mass media), however, express Indigenous filmmakers and artists' use of editing technologies that permit filmmakers to stage performances of oral narrative and Indigenous notions of time and space that are not possible through print alone.

Igloolik Isuma Productions Inc. was created by Inuit to produce and distribute independent Inuit-language films and media art from an Inuit point of view, featuring local actors recreating Inuit life in the Igloolik region.

Indigenous writer Michelle H. Raheja wrote that, when “Inuit performed for the camera, reviewed and criticized their performance and were able to offer suggestions for additional scenes in the film-a way of making films that, when tried today, is thought to be "innovative and original[…]” The films have had a lasting positive impact on Inuit communities, most likely because of the depth of their participation in its creation.” Because Igloolik Isuma Productions Inc. has embraced “contemporary media technologies to help them tell their own stories on their own terms, it has enabled them to control their images and narratives and engage in the creative production of on-screen representations of their lives, histories, and storytelling traditions.” Isuma has also amplified Indigenous Arctic voices in their knowledge of climate change and its future impact on their land through films.

Isuma has allowed many Inuit ideas to take form through many films, short videos, and documentaries that lay claim to their own perspectives and viewpoints.

== Television ==
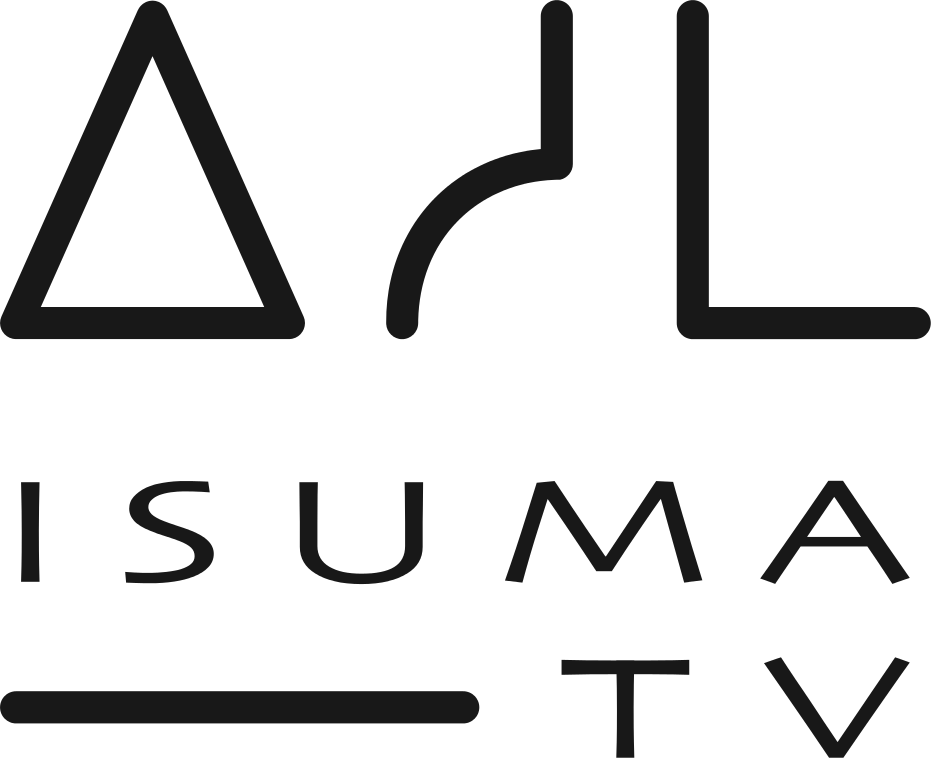
IsumaTV logo

In 2008, Isuma launched IsumaTV, a multimedia website and online portal for Inuit and Indigenous culture. The site is dedicated to Indigenous filmmakers and is a free service; it hosts films that put forth an aboriginal view and is intended to help Native communities around the world become connected.

IsumaTV currently carries over 7,000 videos in 84 different languages, on 800+ user-controlled channels, representing cultures and media organizations from Canada, U.S.A., Greenland, Norway, Sweden, Russia, Australia, New Zealand and all over Latin America. These videos cover several topics from an Inuit perspective, such as Arctic Issues, Indigenous Languages, and Global Community. Users register and open their own platforms and upload their own content. This way, Isuma notes, people can use their media to recover language and traditional indigenous strengths and transform them into contemporary strengths.

== Production ==
=== Films ===
==== Igloolik Isuma Productions ====
- Atanarjuat: The Fast Runner - 2000
- The Journals of Knud Rasmussen - 2006
- Before Tomorrow (Le Jour avant le lendemain) - 2008

==== Kingulliit Productions ====
- Maliglutit (Searchers) - 2016
- Tia and Piujuq - 2018
- One Day in the Life of Noah Piugattuk - 2019
- Tautuktavuk (What We See) - 2023
- Uiksaringitara (Wrong Husband) - 2025

=== Unikaatuatiit (Story Tellers) series ===
- Qaggiq (Gathering Place, 1989)
- Nunaqpa (Going Inland, 1991)
- Saputi (Fish Traps, 1993)

=== Documentaries ===
- Alert Bay (1989)
- Attagutaaluk (Starvation, 1992)
- Qulliq (Oil Lamp, 1993)
- Nunavut: Our Land (1994–95), 13-part TV series
- Stories of Our Elders (28 episode web series now televised by APTN)
- Piujuk & Angutautuk (1994)
- Sanannguarti (Carver, 1995)
- Nipi (Voice, 1999)
- Nanugiurutiga (My First Polar Bear, 2000)
- Ningiura (My Grandmother, 2000)
- Anaana (Mother, 2001)
- Ajainaa! (Almost!, 2001)
- Artcirq (2001)
- Arviq! (Bowhead!, 2002)
- Angakkuiit (Shaman Stories, 2003)
- Kunuk Family Reunion (2004)
- Unakuluk (Dear little one, 2005)
- Qallunajatut (Urban Inuk, 2005)
- Kiviaq vs. Canada (2006)
- Exile - 2009
- Inuit Knowledge and Climate Change (2011)
- Kivitoo: What They Thought of Us (2018)

== See also ==
- Uvagut TV
- Arnait Video Productions
- High Arctic relocation
