= Zacharias Kunuk =

Canadian Inuk producer and director (born 1957)

- ᓴᖅᑲᓕᐊᓯ ᑯᓄᒃ
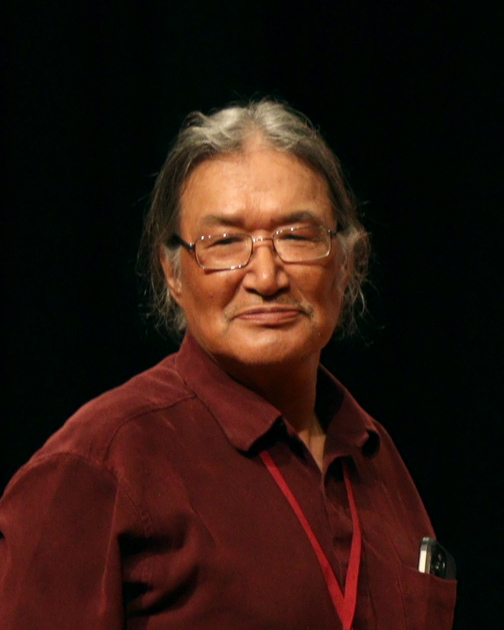
- Kunuk in 2025
- Born: Kifutikajuk Taqaq Nujatut Attafutaluk Quatuk; November 27, 1957 (age 68); Kapuiviit, Nunavut, Canada
- Education: Federal Day School
- Occupations: Producer, director
- Years active: 1995–present
- Employer(s): Isuma Productions, Igloolik
- Known for: Atanarjuat: The Fast Runner
- Partner: Lydia Anguratsiq
- Children: 5
- Parent(s): Enuki, Vivian
- Website: Isuma Productions

Zacharias Kunuk OC ONu (Inuktitut: ᓴᖅᑲᓕᐊᓯ ᑯᓄᒃ, born November 27, 1957) is a Canadian Inuk film producer and director, best known for his film Atanarjuat: The Fast Runner, the first Canadian dramatic feature film produced entirely in Inuktitut with an all Indigenous cast.

He is the president and co-founder of Igloolik Isuma Productions, Canada's first independent Inuit production company. His co-founders are Paul Qulitalik, Paul Apak Angilirq, and Norman Cohn (the only non-Inuk team member). Atanarjuat: The Fast Runner (2001) was named as the greatest Canadian film of all time by the 2015 Toronto International Film Festival poll.

== Background ==
Zacharias Kunuk was born in Kapuiviit (Jens Munk Island) on Baffin Island, Nunavut (then part of the Northwest Territories), Canada. In 1966, he attended school in Igloolik. There he carved and sold soapstone sculptures to afford movie admissions. As his skill improved, he was able to buy cameras and photographed Inuit hunting scenes. When he heard about video cameras in 1981, he purchased the basic equipment to teach himself how to create his own movies.

== Career ==
In 2002, Kunuk was made an Officer of the Order of Canada.

His second film, The Journals of Knud Rasmussen, in which he is a co-writer and co-director with Norman Cohn, is a co-production with Denmark. It premiered on September 7, 2006, as the opening film at the Toronto International Film Festival.

In June 2007, Zacharias Kunuk filmed the rescue and return of his father, Enoki Kunuk, who was lost for 27 days in the Arctic tundra.

Kunuk is the co-founder of the Inuit Knowledge and Climate Change Project, along with Ian Mauro of the University of Victoria's School of Environmental Studies. The goal of the project is to collect information from Inuit elders for a film about the Inuit perspective on the impact of climate change on Inuit culture and the environment. The project submitted a video to the United Nations for the 2009 COP15 Copenhagen Conference on Climate Change which was presented at the National Gallery of Denmark.

As of April 2011, Kunuk is developing a project with Cree filmmaker Neil Diamond about the 18th century conflict between Cree and Inuit, which lasted almost a century.

In July 2017, Kunuk joined the Academy of Motion Picture Arts and Sciences, as part of 774 new members invited that year.

In March 2019, Kunuk was made a member of the Order of Nunavut, the sole member of the Order's 2018 class.

== Filmography ==
- Nunavut: Our Land - 1995, director and writer of television series
- Atanarjuat: The Fast Runner - 2001, director, producer, writer and editor
- Kunuk Family Reunion - 2004, director and producer of television documentary
- Weird Sex and Snowshoes: A Trek Through Canadian Cinematic Psyche - 2004, appeared in television documentary
- The Journals of Knud Rasmussen - 2006, director, producer and art director
- Before Tomorrow (Le Jour avant le lendemain) - 2008, executive producer
- Tungijuq - 2009, executive producer of short
- Home - 2011, director and writer of short
- Sirmilik - 2011, director of documentary
- Searchers (Maliglutit) - 2016
- Edge of the Knife - 2018, executive producer
- Kivitoo: What They Thought of Us - 2018
- One Day in the Life of Noah Piugattuk - 2019
- Angakusajaujuq: The Shaman's Apprentice - 2021
- Wrong Husband (Uiksaringitara) - 2025

== Awards ==
Year	Award	Result	Recipient
2001	Cannes Film Festival: Golden Camera	Win	Atanarjuat: The Fast Runner
2001	Edinburgh International Film Festival: New Directors Award	Win	Atanarjuat: The Fast Runner (Tied with L.I.E.)
2001	Ghent International Film Festival: FIPRESCI Prize-Special Mention-Grand Prix	Win	Atanarjuat: The Fast Runner
2001	Hawaii International Film Festival: Special Mention Best Feature Film, Best Feature Film	Nominated	Atanarjuat: The Fast Runner
2001	Santa Fe Film Festival: Luminaria-Best Feature	Win	Atanarjuat: The Fast Runner
2001	Toronto International Film Festival: Best Canadian Feature Film	Win	Atanarjuat: The Fast Runner
2001	Cinemanila International Film Festival: Lino Brocka Award	Win	Atanarjuat: The Fast Runner (Tied with What Time Is It Over There?)
2002	Genie Awards: Claude Jutra Award-Best Achievement in Direction, Best Achievement in Editing, Best Motion Picture	Win	Atanarjuat: The Fast Runner (Shared with Norman Cohn, Paul Apak Angilirq, Germain Wong)
2002	Newport International Film Festival: Audience Award-Best Feature	Win	Atanarjuat: The Fast Runner
2002	San Diego International Film Festival: Festival Award-Best Feature Film	Win	Atanarjuat: The Fast Runner
2002	Toronto Film Critics Association Awards: TFCA Award-Best First Feature	Win	Atanarjuat: The Fast Runner
2003	Chicago Film Critics Association Awards: CFCA Award – Most Promising Director	Nominated	Atanarjuat: The Fast Runner
2003	Independent Spirit Awards: Independent Spirit Award-Best Foreign Film	Nominated	Atanarjuat: The Fast Runner
2019	Vancouver International Film Festival: Best Canadian Film Award	Won	One Day in the Life of Noah Piugattuk
2021	Toronto International Film Festival Award for Best Canadian Short Film	Won	Angakusajaujuq: The Shaman's Apprentice
2025	Toronto International Film Festival Award for Best Canadian Film	Won	Wrong Husband

== Books ==
- Angakusajaujuq: The Shaman's Apprentice (2021)

== See also ==
- Indigenous Canadian personalities
