= Igloolik =

Igloolik ᐃᒡᓗᓕᒃ Iglulik
- Hamlet
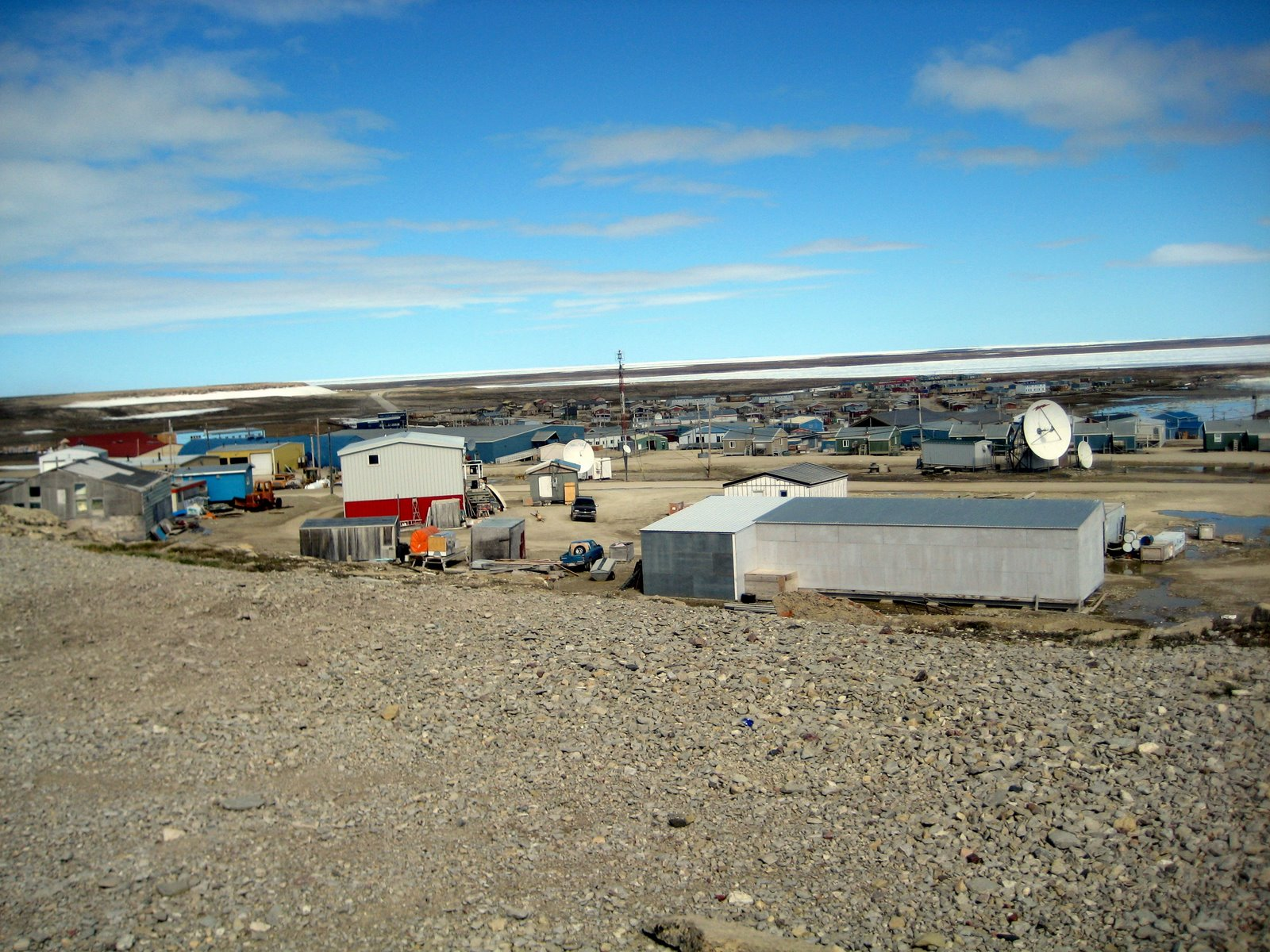
- Igloolik

- Location within Nunavut Location within Canada
- Coordinates: 69°23′N 081°48′W
- Country: Canada
- Territory: Nunavut
- Region: Qikiqtaaluk
- Electoral district: Aggu; Amittuq

Government
  - Mayor: George Auksaq
  - MLA Aggu: Edward Attagutaluk
  - MLA Amittuq: Abraham Qammaniq

Area (2021)
  - Total: 104.86 km^{2} (40.49 sq mi)
- Elevation: 53 m (174 ft)

Population (2021)
  - Total: 2,049
  - Density: 19.5/km^{2} (51/sq mi)
- Time zone: UTC– 05:00 (EST)
  - Summer (DST): UTC– 04:00 (EDT)
- Canadian Postal code: X0A 0L0
- Area code: 867

Igloolik (Inuktitut syllabics: ᐃᒡᓗᓕᒃ, Iglulik, Inuktitut pronunciation: [iɣ.lu.ˈlik]) is an Inuit hamlet in Foxe Basin, Qikiqtaaluk Region in Nunavut, northern Canada. Because its location on Igloolik Island is close to Melville Peninsula, it is often mistakenly thought to be on the peninsula. The name "Igloolik" means "there is a house here". It derives from iglu meaning house or building, and refers to the sod houses that were originally in the area, not to snow igloos. In Inuktitut the residents are called Iglulingmiut (the suffix miut means "people of").

== History ==
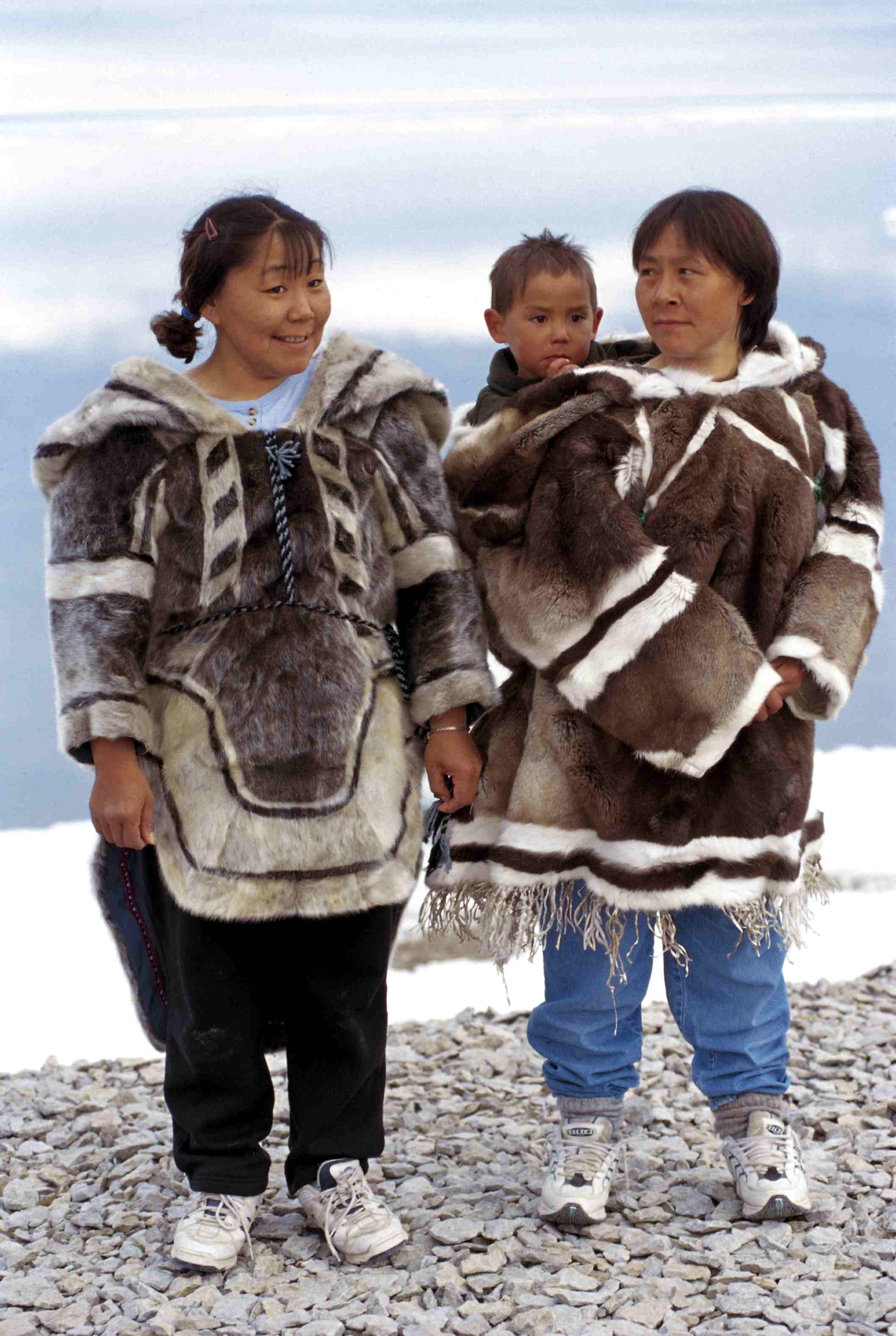
Traditional amautiit made from seal (left) and caribou (right) are occasionally worn by infants and mothers, although fabric versions are more common today

Information about the area's earliest inhabitants comes mainly from numerous archaeological sites on the island; some dating back more than 4,000 years. First contact with Europeans came when the British Royal Navy ships HMS Fury and HMS Hecla, under the command of Captain William Edward Parry, wintered in Igloolik in 1822.

The island was visited in 1867 and 1868 by the American explorer Charles Francis Hall in his search for survivors of the lost Franklin Expedition. In 1913, Alfred Tremblay, a French-Canadian prospector with Captain Joseph-Elzéar Bernier's expedition to Pond Inlet, extended his mineral exploration overland to Igloolik, and in 1921 a member of Knud Rasmussen's Fifth Thule Expedition visited the island.

The first permanent presence by southerners in Igloolik came with the establishment of a Roman Catholic Mission in the 1930s. By the end of the decade, the Hudson's Bay Company had also set up a post on the island.

Non-indigenous establishments, such as Royal Canadian Mounted Police (RCMP) stations, day schools, and clinics, were here before they came to be in surrounding communities. The Igloolik Research Centre focuses on documenting Inuit traditional knowledge and technology, as well as climatology and seismic data research.

== Culture ==
Anthropologically, Iglulik Inuit are usually considered to be the Iglulingmiut, the Aivilingmiut, and the Tununirmiut, the Inuit from northern Baffin Island, on Southampton Island, and in the Melville Peninsula.

An ancient legend from the Igloolik area was adapted by Zacharias Kunuk into the award-winning Canadian film Atanarjuat: The Fast Runner in 2001. In 2004, Isuma produced the film The Journals of Knud Rasmussen which was released in September 2006 after premiering at the Toronto International Film Festival.

Igloolik is also the home-base of the only Inuit circus, Artcirq. This collective is active in video-making, music production and live circus show performances. Early in 2008, when temperatures in Igloolik were at −50 °C (−58 °F), eight members of Artcirq went to Essakane north of Timbuktu, Mali, where temperatures were 40 °C (104 °F), to perform at the Festival au Désert. In February 2010, six members of Artcirq represented Nunavut in performances at the 2010 Olympic Winter Games in Vancouver, British Columbia.

In late 2007, the Igloolik Hunters and Trappers Organization (HTO) banned all forms of tourism (sport hunting, filming, photography, watching) related to the northern Foxe Basin walrus population for a period of two years. This ban was in response to an observed decrease in walrus. The Igloolik Inuit continued to harvest walrus while the tourism ban was in place.

In 2017, documentary film maker Alan Zweig released There Is a House Here, a documentary film about his visits to the community.

As of 2025 the mayor of the hamlet is George Auksaq, who was elected in the 23 October 2023 municipal elections. At the same election the following seven councillors were acclaimed, Edward Attagutaluk, Amanda Curley, Ludger Makkik, Jacob Malliki, Shanshan Tian, Celina Uttuigak, and Celestino Uyarak.

== Demographics ==
Federal census population history of Igloolik
Year	Pop.	±%
1971	566	—
1976	675	+19.3%
1981	746	+10.5%
1986	857	+14.9%
1991	936	+9.2%
1996	1,174	+25.4%
2001	1,286	+9.5%
2006	1,538	+19.6%
2011	1,454	−5.5%
2016	1,744	+19.9%
2021	2,049	+17.5%
Source: Statistics Canada

In the 2021 Canadian census conducted by Statistics Canada, Igloolik had a population of 2,049 living in 394 of its 468 total private dwellings, a change of 17.5 per cent from its 2016 population of 1,744. With a land area of 104.86 km^{2} (40.49 sq mi), it had a population density of 19.5/km^{2} (50.6/sq mi) in 2021.

Panethnic groups in Igloolik (2001–2021)
Panethnic group	2021		2016		2006		2001	
Panethnic group	Pop.	%	Pop.	%	Pop.	%	Pop.	%
Indigenous	1,935	94.85%	1,580	94.61%	1,445	93.83%	1,230	96.09%
European (Note: Statistic includes all persons that did not make up part of a visible minority or an indigenous identity.)	90	4.41%	70	4.19%	95	6.17%	45	3.52%
South Asian	0	0%	10	0.6%	0	0%	0	0%
Southeast Asian (Note: Statistic includes total responses of "Filipino" and "Southeast Asian" under visible minority section on census.)	0	0%	10	0.6%	0	0%	0	0%
Latin American	0	0%	10	0.6%	0	0%	0	0%
East Asian (Note: Statistic includes total responses of "Chinese", "Korean", and "Japanese" under visible minority section on census.)	0	0%	0	0%	10	0.65%	0	0%
African	0	0%	0	0%	0	0%	0	0%
Middle Eastern (Note: Statistic includes total responses of "West Asian" and "Arab" under visible minority section on census.)	0	0%	0	0%	0	0%	0	0%
Other/multiracial (Note: Statistic includes total responses of "Visible minority, n.i.e." and "Multiple visible minorities" under visible minority section on census.)	15	0.74%	0	0%	0	0%	0	0%
Total responses	2,040	99.56%	1,670	95.76%	1,540	100.13%	1,280	99.53%
Total population	2,049	100%	1,744	100%	1,538	100%	1,286	100%
Note: Totals greater than 100% due to multiple origin responses

== Environmental concerns ==
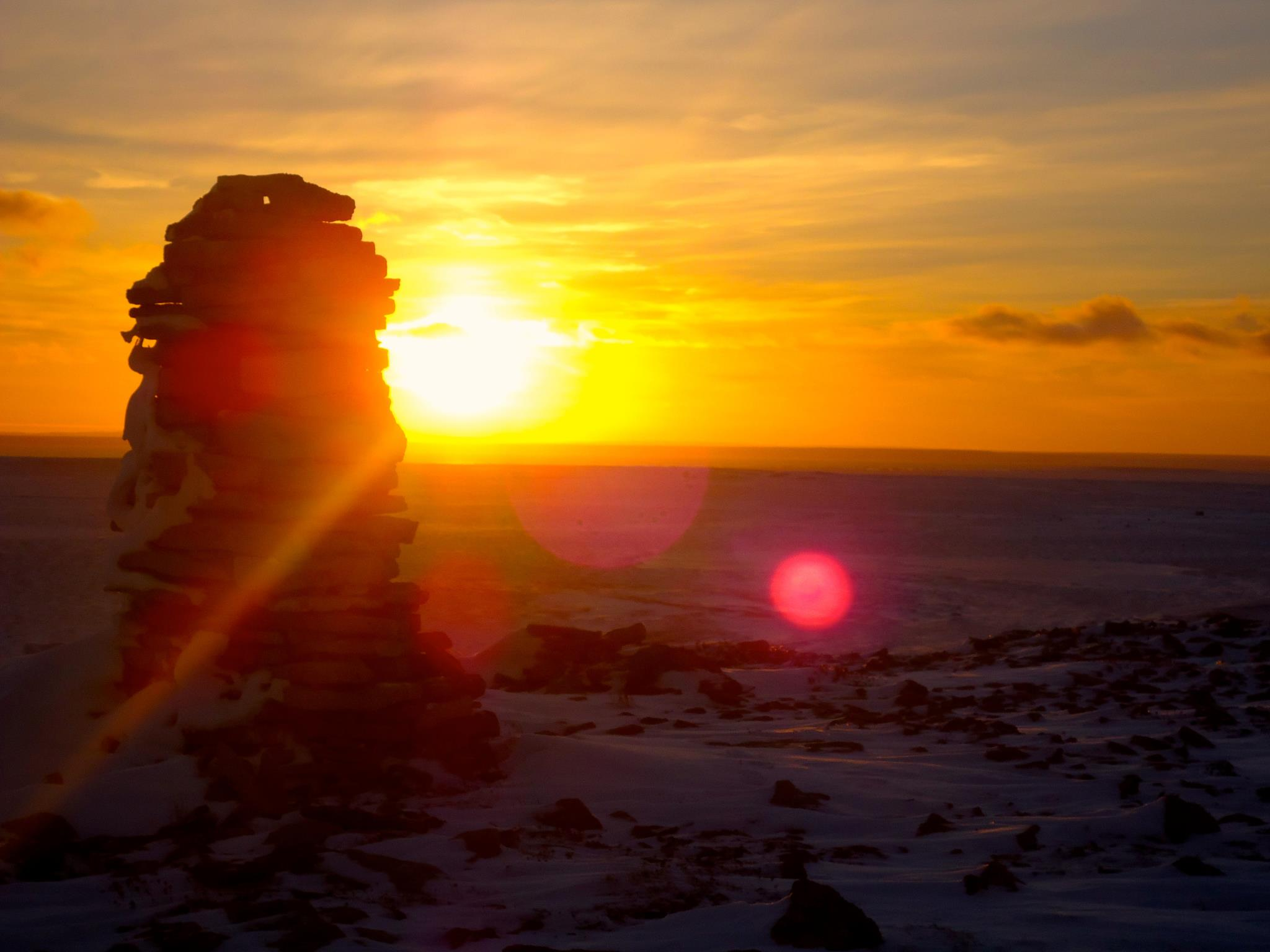
Sunset in Igloolik

The Canadian Broadcasting Corporation interviewed people from the region in April 2008, about their concerns over plans to ship iron ore from the nearby Steensby Inlet on Baffin Island from the Baffinland Iron Mine. Jaypetee Palluq, an Igloolik resident who had been asked to serve on a Baffinland advisory committee, was concerned that the mine's operation would interfere with the traditional hunts for sea mammals, like walrus. He called on Baffinland to "find an alternate shipping route to the mine, regardless of the cost."

Paul Quassa, former mayor of Igloolik, also expressed concern, over the effect of freighters on the ice used by the walrus. He said the region was known for its highly prized aged, fermented walrus meat, a valuable export from the region.

On 2 November 2016, CBC News reported that residents had detected a "ping" via sonar, describing it as a hum or buzz emanating from the seabead of the Fury and Hecla Strait—near Steensby Inlet where Baffinland has one of its ports.

Paul Quassa, Igloolik's representative to the Legislative Assembly of Nunavut, said the hum had been disturbing the sea mammals community members rely on for food. The Royal Canadian Air Force sent a Lockheed CP-140 Aurora to the area but were unable to detect the noise or the source.

== Climate ==
Igloolik has a polar climate (ET) with nine months averaging below 0 °C (32 °F). Winters are long and cold, with October being the snowiest month. Summers range from chilly to sometimes mild, with cold nights.

Climate data for Igloolik (Igloolik Airport) Climate ID: 2402543; coordinates 69°22′N 81°49′W; elevation: 52.7 m (173 ft); 1991–2020 normals
Month	Jan	Feb	Mar	Apr	May	Jun	Jul	Aug	Sep	Oct	Nov	Dec	Year
Record high humidex	−4.2	−0.6	−3.9	0.3	5.6	18.7	24.3	24.5	11.2	3.4	−0.5	−1.5	24.5
Record high °C (°F)	−1.0 (30.2)	−1.0 (30.2)	−3.0 (26.6)	1.5 (34.7)	7.0 (44.6)	19.0 (66.2)	24.5 (76.1)	25.0 (77.0)	15.0 (59.0)	5.0 (41.0)	−0.5 (31.1)	−1.5 (29.3)	25.0 (77.0)
Mean daily maximum °C (°F)	−27.6 (−17.7)	−27.8 (−18.0)	−23.8 (−10.8)	−14.3 (6.3)	−4.5 (23.9)	4.1 (39.4)	11.7 (53.1)	8.8 (47.8)	1.8 (35.2)	−4.6 (23.7)	−15.0 (5.0)	−21.6 (−6.9)	−9.4 (15.1)
Daily mean °C (°F)	−30.9 (−23.6)	−31.0 (−23.8)	−27.7 (−17.9)	−18.4 (−1.1)	−7.8 (18.0)	1.6 (34.9)	7.9 (46.2)	5.8 (42.4)	0.0 (32.0)	−6.8 (19.8)	−18.4 (−1.1)	−25.4 (−13.7)	−12.6 (9.3)
Mean daily minimum °C (°F)	−34.1 (−29.4)	−34.2 (−29.6)	−31.3 (−24.3)	−22.6 (−8.7)	−11.3 (11.7)	−0.9 (30.4)	4.0 (39.2)	2.7 (36.9)	−1.9 (28.6)	−9.1 (15.6)	−21.7 (−7.1)	−29.0 (−20.2)	−15.8 (3.6)
Record low °C (°F)	−45.0 (−49.0)	−45.5 (−49.9)	−47.0 (−52.6)	−37.5 (−35.5)	−28.0 (−18.4)	−13.5 (7.7)	−1.0 (30.2)	−5.5 (22.1)	−11.0 (12.2)	−22.5 (−8.5)	−36.0 (−32.8)	−42.5 (−44.5)	−47.0 (−52.6)
Record low wind chill	−61.0	−66	−58	−49	−35	−21	−4	−11	−18	−50	−50	−56	−66
Average precipitation mm (inches)	6.6 (0.26)	7.1 (0.28)	13.4 (0.53)	17.0 (0.67)	15.2 (0.60)	16.5 (0.65)	25.7 (1.01)	34.9 (1.37)	27.6 (1.09)	35.0 (1.38)	18.5 (0.73)	11.5 (0.45)	228.9 (9.01)
Average rainfall mm (inches)	0.0 (0.0)	0.0 (0.0)	0.0 (0.0)	0.1 (0.00)	0.2 (0.01)	12.8 (0.50)	25.7 (1.01)	32.2 (1.27)	17 (0.7)	1.3 (0.05)	0.0 (0.0)	0.0 (0.0)	89.2 (3.51)
Average snowfall cm (inches)	6.6 (2.6)	7.2 (2.8)	14.0 (5.5)	17.5 (6.9)	15.3 (6.0)	3.8 (1.5)	0.0 (0.0)	2.7 (1.1)	11.7 (4.6)	33.4 (13.1)	18.5 (7.3)	11.6 (4.6)	142.2 (56.0)
Average precipitation days (≥ 0.2 mm)	4.2	4.4	6.6	7.3	6.7	7.2	9.3	10.4	9.5	11.6	7.9	6.3	91.4
Average rainy days (≥ 0.2 mm)	0.0	0.0	0.0	0.11	0.11	5.6	9.3	9.9	5.9	0.42	0.0	0.0	31.4
Average snowy days (≥ 0.2 cm)	4.4	4.4	6.6	7.2	6.6	1.7	0.0	0.59	4.5	10.8	7.7	6.2	60.7
Average relative humidity (%) (at 1500 LST)	73.3	80.5	73.2	—	—	79.8	—	—	—	—	81.4	78.6	—
Source: Environment and Climate Change Canada Canadian Climate Normals 1991–2020 (Humidex, wind chill, and humidity from Canadian Climate Normals 1981–2010)

== Broadband communications ==
The community has been served by the Qiniq network since 2005. Qiniq is a fixed wireless service to homes and businesses, connecting to the outside world via a satellite backbone. The Qiniq network is designed and operated by SSI Micro. In 2017, the network was upgraded to 4G LTE technology, and 2G-GSM for mobile voice.

== Transportation ==
The community is served by the Igloolik Airport.

== Notable people ==
- Germaine Arnaktauyok (born 1946), artist
- Levi Barnabas (born 1964), politician
- Lori Idlout, Member of the Canadian Parliament for Nunavut
- Northern Haze, rock band
- Annabella Piugattuk (born 1982), actress
- Paul Quassa, Premier of Nunavut (2017–2018)
- Aua, spiritual leader
- Kelly Fraser (1993–2019), singer-songwriter
- Terry Uyarak, singer-songwriter
- Zorga Qaunaq, actress and artist

== Gallery ==
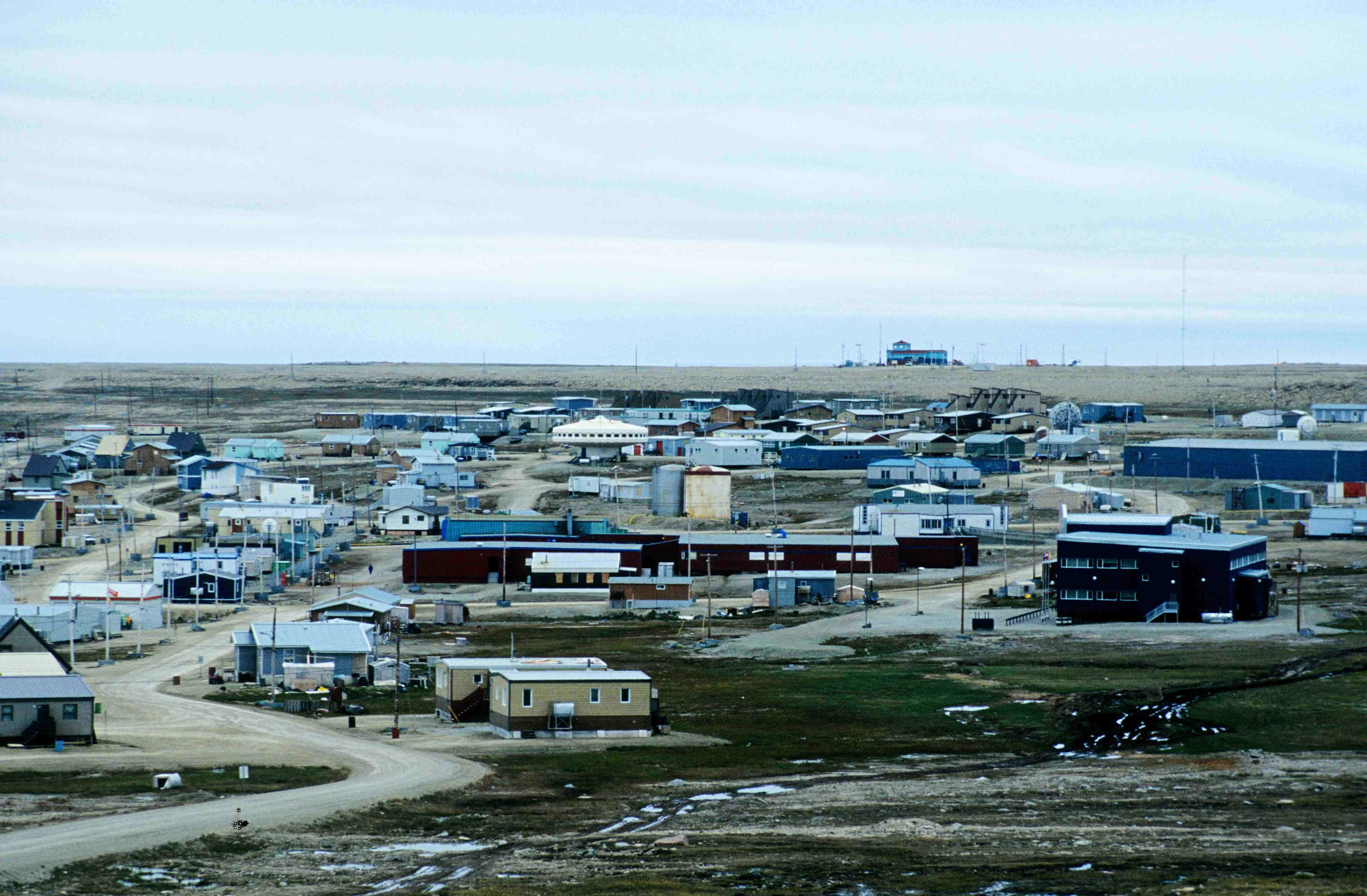
Part of the hamlet, August 2002

After the sun has gone below the horizon

The Igloolik Return of the Sun festival

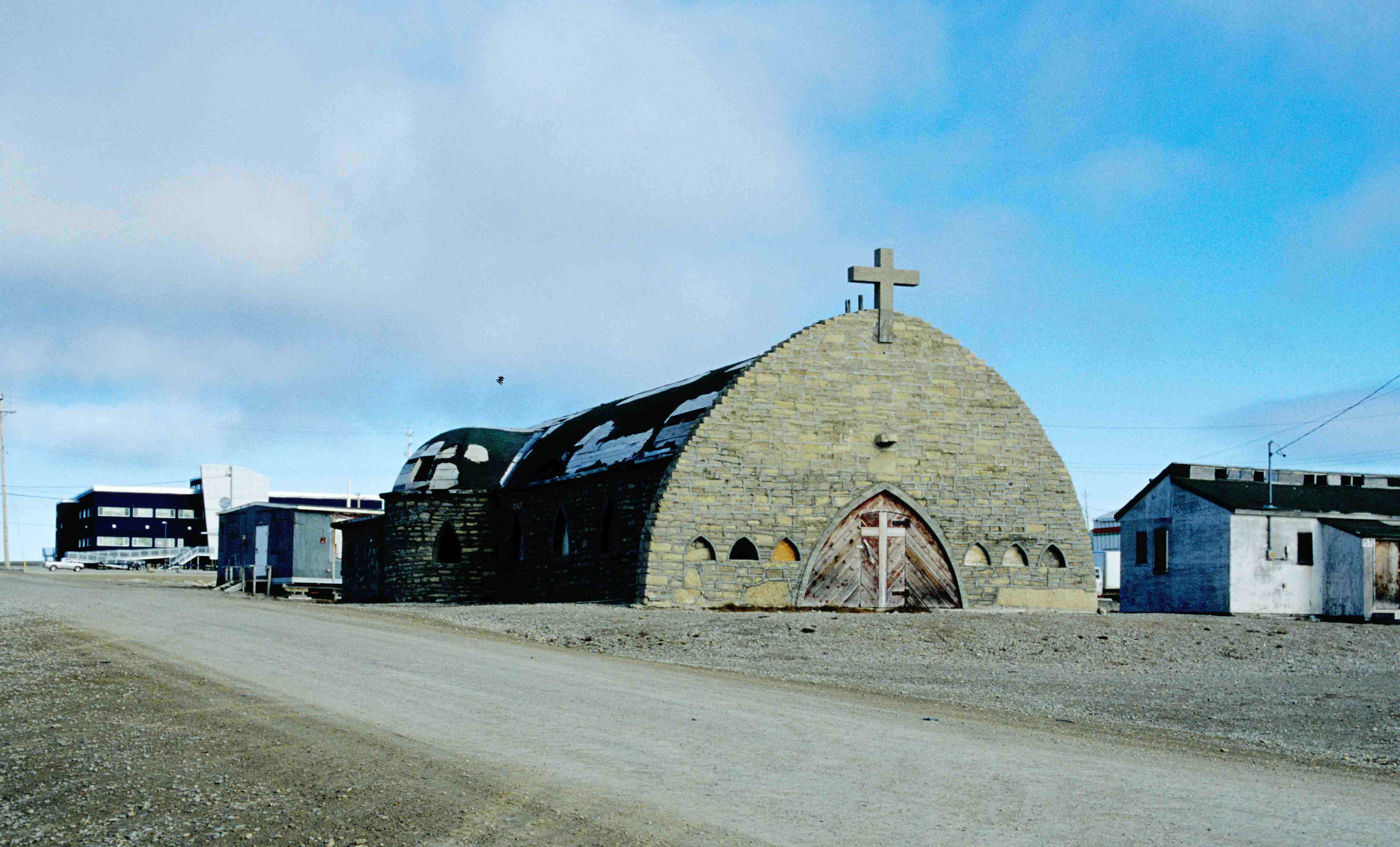
The old stone church, August 2002, prior to being torn down in 2006

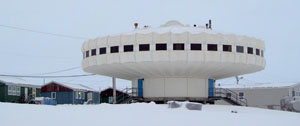
The Igloolik Research Centre

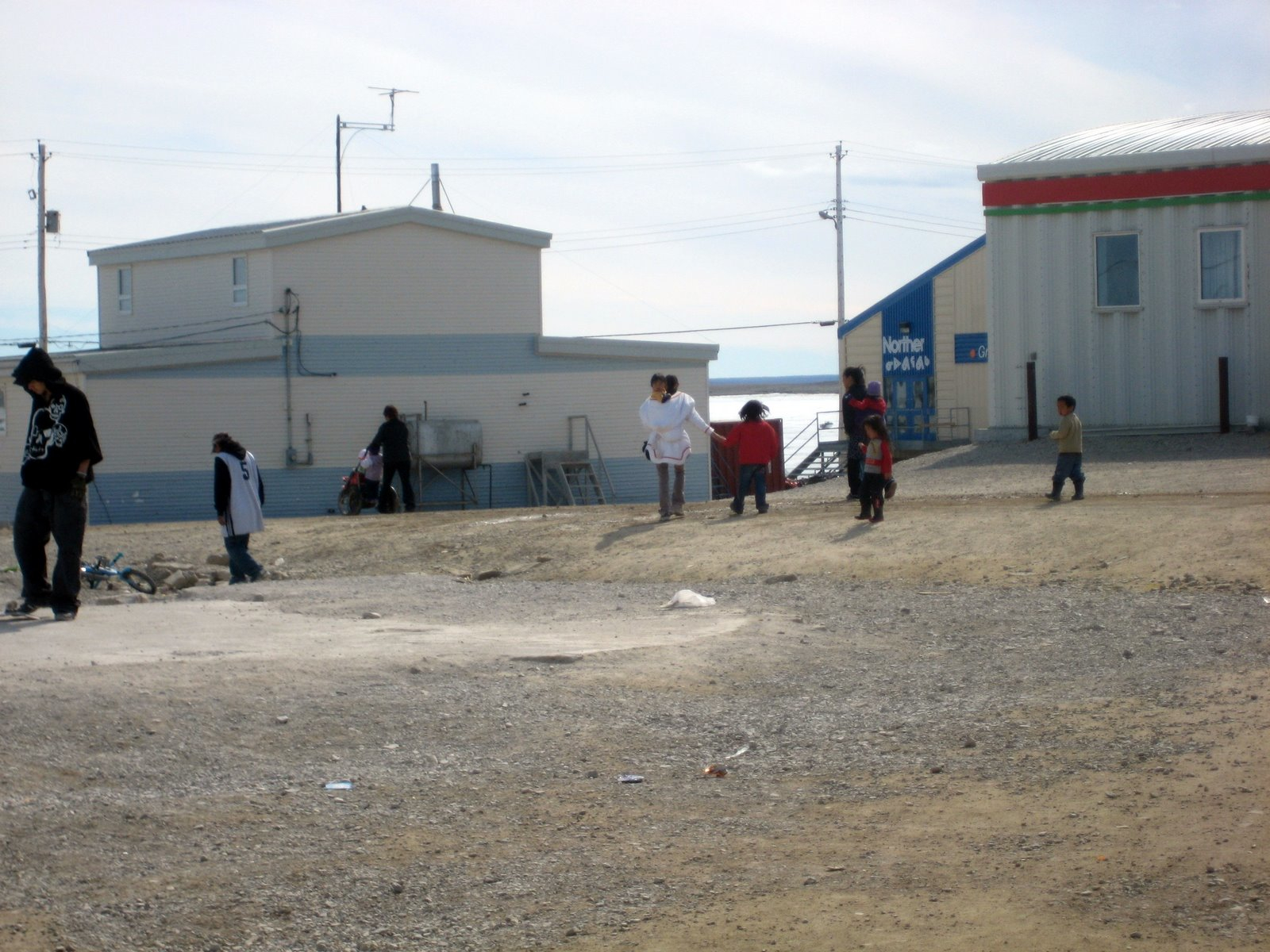
Women carry their children in amautiit while walking to Northern Store, past Isuma productions (left) and the Coop hotel (right)

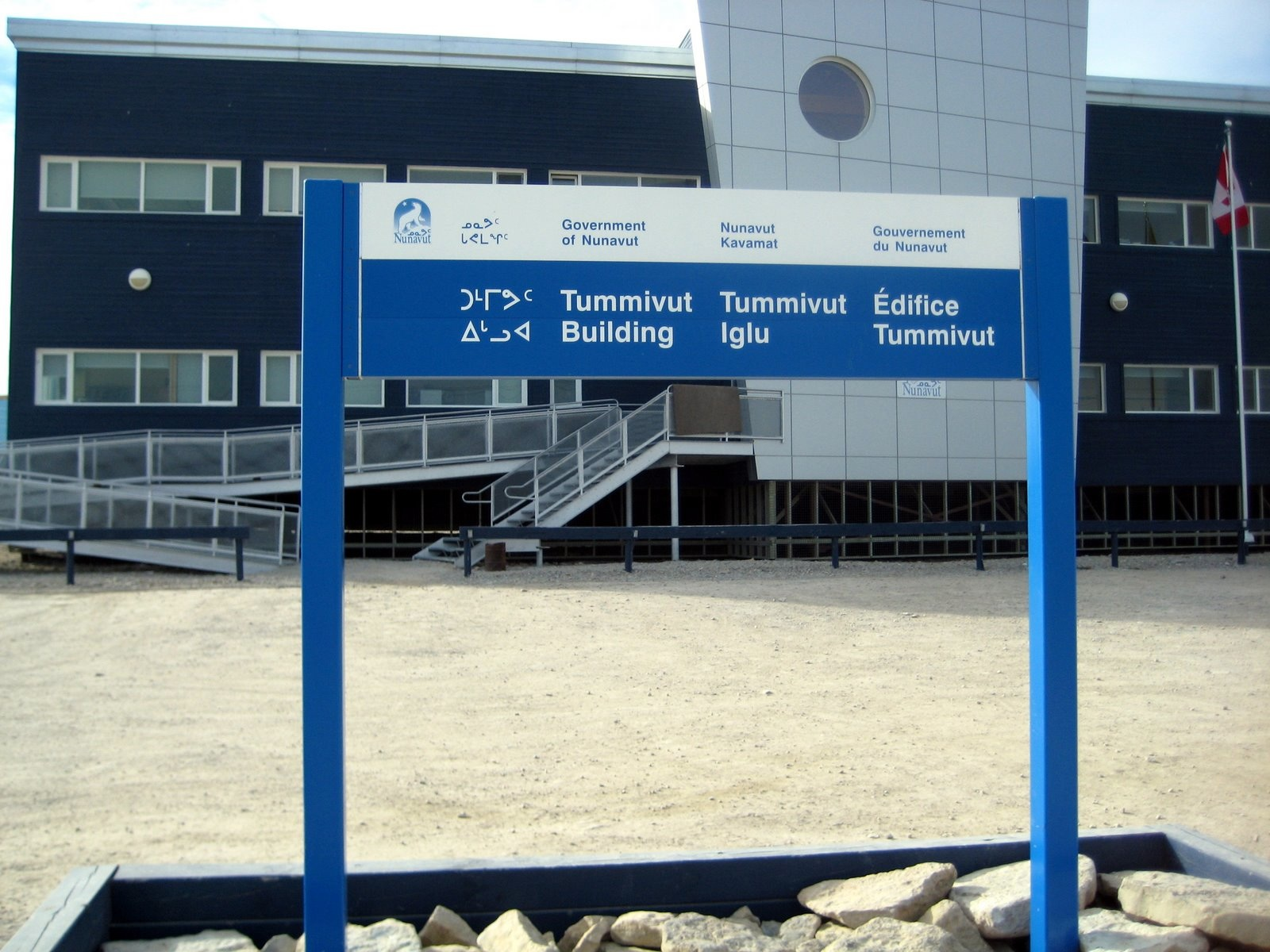
Tummivut Iglu – The Nunavut government building in Igloolik

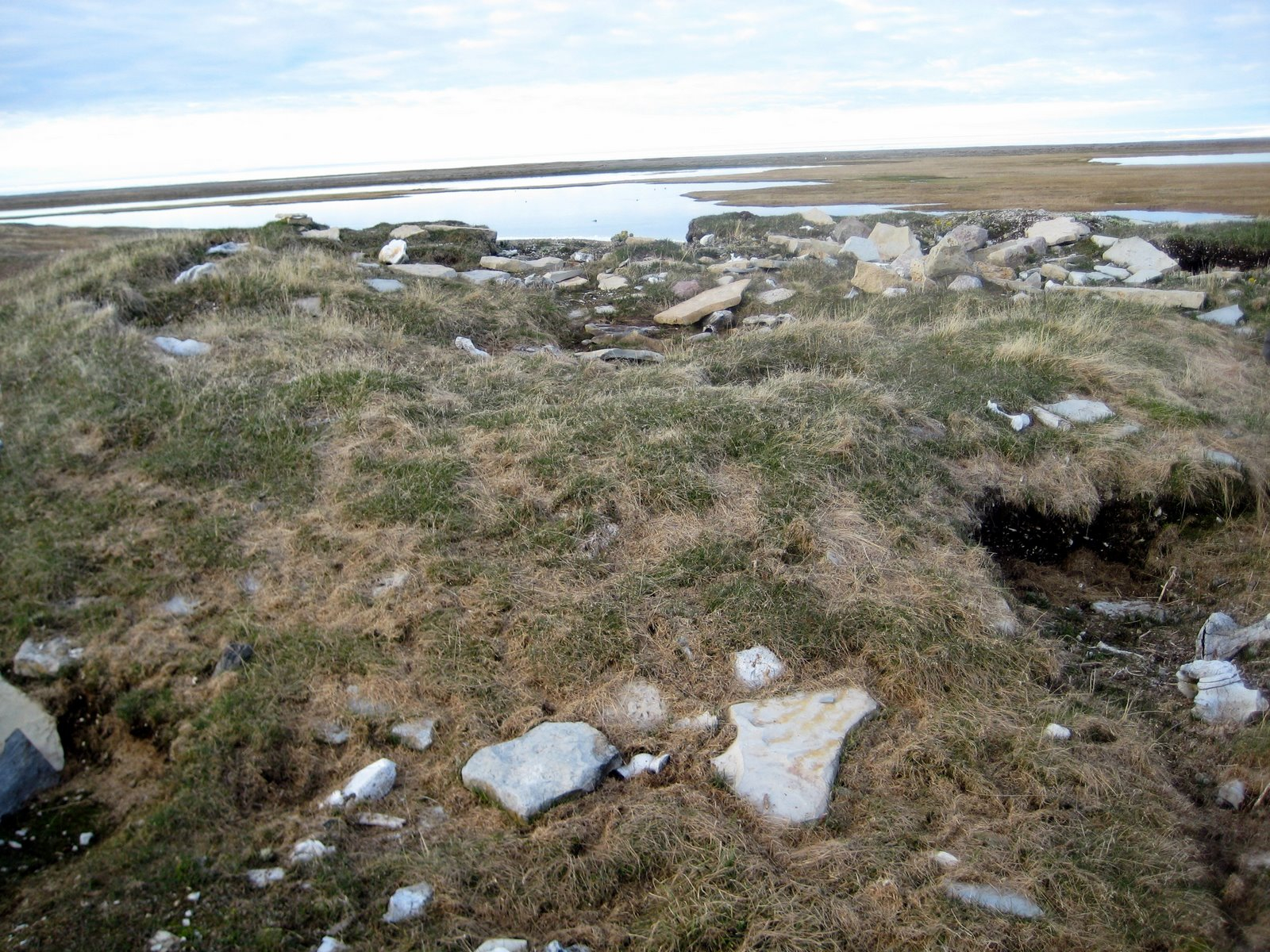
Remnants of older Inuit sod houses in Igloolik Point

== See also ==
- List of municipalities in Nunavut
- Kayak angst
