= 12th Jutra Awards =

2010 Canadian film awards ceremony

The 12th Jutra Awards were held on March 28, 2010 to honour films made with the participation of the Quebec film industry in 2009. The nominees were announced on February 16.

Through the Mist (Dédé, à travers les brumes), a biopic about Dédé Fortin, lead the ceremony with ten nominations. It ended up winning four awards, including Best Actor for Sébastien Ricard and Best Original Music which was awarded posthumously to Fortin.

Denis Villeneuve's Polytechnique won the most awards of the night with five, including Best Director and Best Supporting Actor for Maxim Gaudette, but lost Best Film to Xavier Dolan's I Killed My Mother (J'ai tué ma mère) who took home four awards, including Best Screenplay and Best Actress for Anne Dorval. Dolan became the first person to be nominated for Best Film, Best Director, Best Actor and Best Screenplay for the same film.

1981 won two awards, including Best Supporting Actress for Sandrine Bisson. The Master Key (Grande Ourse: la clé des possibles) received nine nominations, but ended up winning none. It tied the record set by Babine for most nominations without one for Best Film.

== Winners and nominees ==
Best Film	Best Director
I Killed My Mother (J'ai tué ma mère) — Xavier Dolan, Carole Mondello, Daniel Morin; 1981 — Nicole Robert; Before Tomorrow (Le jour avant le lendemain) — Stéphane Rituit, Norman Cohn, Zacharias Kunuk; Polytechnique — Maxime Rémillard, Don Carmody; Through the Mist (Dédé, à travers les brumes) — Roger Frappier, Luc Vandal	Denis Villeneuve, Polytechnique; Marie-Hélène Cousineau and Madeline Ivalu, Before Tomorrow (Le jour avant le lendemain); Xavier Dolan, I Killed My Mother (J'ai tué ma mère); Jean-Philippe Duval, Through the Mist (Dédé, à travers les brumes); Ricardo Trogi, 1981
Best Actor	Best Actress
Sébastien Ricard, Through the Mist (Dédé, à travers les brumes); Jean-Carl Boucher, 1981; Michel Côté, Father and Guns (De père en flic); Normand D'Amour, 5150 Elm's Way (5150, rue des Ormes); Xavier Dolan, I Killed My Mother (J'ai tué ma mère)	Anne Dorval, I Killed My Mother (J'ai tué ma mère); Céline Bonnier, Je me souviens; Marie-Thérèse Fortin, Heat Wave (Les grandes chaleurs); Isabelle Guérard, Detour (Détour); Élise Guilbault, The Legacy (La donation)
Best Supporting Actor	Best Supporting Actress
Maxim Gaudette, Polytechnique; Normand Daneau, Suzie; Rémy Girard, Father and Guns (De père en flic); Stephen McHattie, The Timekeeper (L'heure de vérité); Dimitri Storoge, Through the Mist (Dédé, à travers les brumes)	Sandrine Bisson, 1981; Hélène Bourgeois Leclerc, Je me souviens; Bénédicte Décary, Through the Mist (Dédé, à travers les brumes); Fanny Mallette, The Master Key (Grande Ourse, la clé des possibles); Sonia Vachon, 5150 Elm's Way (5150, rue des Ormes)
Best Screenplay	Best Cinematography
Xavier Dolan, I Killed My Mother (J'ai tué ma mère); Jean-Philippe Duval, Through the Mist (Dédé, à travers les brumes); Bernard Émond, The Legacy (La donation); André Forcier and Linda Pinet, Je me souviens; Ken Scott, Sticky Fingers (Les doigts croches)	Pierre Gill, Polytechnique; Bernard Couture, Cadavres; Daniel Jobin, Je me souviens; Sara Mishara, The Legacy (La donation); Ronald Plante, The Master Key (Grande Ourse, la clé des possibles)
Best Art Direction	Best Sound
David Pelletier, Through the Mist (Dédé, à travers les brumes); Jean Babin, The Master Key (Grande Ourse, la clé des possibles); André-Line Beauparlant, The Timekeeper (L'heure de vérité); Jean Bécotte, Cadavres; Danielle Labrie, Sticky Fingers (Les doigts croches)	Pierre Blain, Claude Beaugrand and Stephane Bergeron, Polytechnique; Mario Auclair, Christian Rivest, Sylvain Lefebvre and Michel Gauvin, Cadavres; Mario Auclair, Pierre-Jules Audet, Luc Boudrias and Louis Gignac, The Master Key (Grande Ourse, la clé des possibles); Marcel Chouinard, Richard Lavoie, Dean Giammarco and Bill Sheppard, The Timekeeper (L'heure de vérité); Dominik Pagacz and Gavin Fernandes, Angel at Sea (Un ange à la mer)
Best Editing	Best Original Music
Richard Comeau, Polytechnique; Michel Arcand, Love and Savagery; Glenn Berman, Angel at Sea (Un ange à la mer); Michel Grou, The Master Key (Grande Ourse, la clé des possibles); Linda Pinet, Je me souviens	Dédé Fortin, Les Colocs and Éloi Painchaud, Through the Mist (Dédé, à travers les brumes); Benoît Charest, Polytechnique; Bertrand Chenier, Love and Savagery; Normand Corbeil, The Master Key (Grande Ourse, la clé des possibles); Kate and Anna McGarrigle, Before Tomorrow (Le jour avant le lendemain)
Best Costume Design	Best Makeup
Judy Jonker, Through the Mist (Dédé, à travers les brumes); Carmen Alie, The Master Key (Grande Ourse, la clé des possibles); Atuat Akkitirq and Micheline Ammaq, Before Tomorrow (Le jour avant le lendemain); Sophie Lefebvre, The Timekeeper (L'heure de vérité); Ginette Magny, Sticky Fingers (Les doigts croches)	Colleen Quinton, Cadavres; Djina Caron, The Master Key (Grande Ourse, la clé des possibles); Bruno Gatien, Sophie Lebeau and Mélanie Rodrigue, Martyrs; Joan-Patricia Parris, 5150 Elm's Way (5150, rue des Ormes); Fanny Vachon, The Timekeeper (L'heure de vérité)
Best Hairstyling	Best Documentary
Linda Gordon, 1981; André Duval, The Master Key (Grande Ourse, la clé des possibles); Martin Lapointe, Waitresses Wanted (Serveuses demandées); Marie-Lyne Normandin, Through the Mist (Dédé, à travers les brumes); Martin Rivest, Je me souviens	Last Train Home — Lixin Fan; Antoine — Laura Bari; Men for Sale (Hommes à louer) — Rodrigue Jean; Shots in the Dark (Silence, on vaccine) — Lina B. Moreco; A Tent on Mars (Une tente sur mars) — Martin Bureau and Luc Renaud
Best Live Action Short	Best Animated Short Film
Danse Macabre — Pedro Pires; La chute — Ivan Grbovic; Mon cher Robert — Claude Brie; L'Ordre des choses — Anne Émond; Snow Hides the Shade of Fig Trees (La neige cache l'ombre des figuiers) — Samer Najari	Robes of War (Robe de guerre) — Michèle Cournoyer; The Drawer and the Crow (Le tiroir et le corbeau) — Frédérick Tremblay; M — Félix Dufour-Laperrière; Oko — Alain Fournier; Playtime — Steven Woloshen
Most Successful Film Outside Quebec	Special awards
I Killed My Mother (J'ai tué ma mère) — Xavier Dolan; It's Not Me, I Swear! (C'est pas moi, je le jure!) — Philippe Falardeau; Mommy Is at the Hairdresser's (Maman est chez le coiffeur) — Léa Pool; The Necessities of Life (Ce qu'il faut pour vivre) — Benoît Pilon; A No-Hit No-Run Summer (Un été sans point ni coup sûr) — Francis Leclerc	Billet d'or: Father and Guns (De père en flic); Jutra Hommage: René Malo

== Multiple wins and nominations ==
=== Films with multiple nominations ===
Nominations	Film
10	Through the Mist (Dédé, à travers les brumes)
9	The Master Key (Grande Ourse, la clé des possibles)
7	Polytechnique
6	I Killed My Mother (J'ai tué ma mère)
6	Je me souviens
5	1981
5	The Timekeeper (L'heure de vérité)
4	Before Tomorrow (Le jour avant le lendemain)
4	Cadavres
3	5150 Elm's Way (5150, rue des Ormes)
3	The Legacy (La donation)
3	Sticky Fingers (Les doigts croches)
2	Angel at Sea (Un ange à la mer)
2	Love and Savagery

=== Films with multiple wins ===
Wins	Film
5	Polytechnique
4	I Killed My Mother (J'ai tué ma mère)
4	Through the Mist (Dédé, à travers les brumes)
2	1981
