= 30th Genie Awards =

2010 Canadian film awards ceremony

- Date: April 12, 2010
- Site: Guvernment/Kool Haus Entertainment Complex, Toronto, Ontario

Highlights
- Best Picture: Polytechnique
- Most awards: Polytechnique (9)
- Most nominations: Polytechnique (11)

Television coverage
- Network: Independent Film Channel, CBC.ca, The Movie Network (delayed broadcast) and Movie Central (delayed broadcast)

The 30th Genie Awards were presented on April 12, 2010, to honour films released in 2009. Nominations were announced on March 1, 2010.

== Controversy ==
Despite having won three awards at the 2009 Cannes Film Festival and having been selected as Canada's submission for Best Foreign Language film at the 82nd Academy Awards, Xavier Dolan's film I Killed My Mother (J'ai tué ma mère) was virtually absent from the ceremony, winning the Claude Jutra Award for best film by a first-time director but garnering no other nominations in any category at all. Both Kevin Tierney, vice-chairman of cinema for the Academy of Canadian Cinema and Television, and Martha Burns, the winner of the Genie Award for Best Supporting Actress, openly criticized the shutout, with Tierney likening it to "being sent to the kiddie table".

== Awards ==
Motion Picture	Direction
Polytechnique — Maxime Rémillard, Don Carmody; 3 Seasons (3 saisons) — Maude Bouchard, Jim Donovan, Sandy Martinez, Bruno Rosato; Before Tomorrow (Le Jour avant le lendemain) — Stéphane Rituit; Fifty Dead Men Walking — Shawn Williamson, Stephen Hegyes, Peter La Terriere, Kari Skogland; Nurse.Fighter.Boy — Ingrid Veninger	Denis Villeneuve, Polytechnique; Marie-Hélène Cousineau and Madeline Ivalu, Before Tomorrow (Le Jour avant le lendemain); Bruce McDonald, Pontypool; Charles Officer, Nurse.Fighter.Boy; Kari Skogland, Fifty Dead Men Walking
Actor in a leading role	Actress in a leading role
Joshua Jackson, One Week; Jean-Carl Boucher, 1981; Paul-Dylan Ivalu, Before Tomorrow (Le Jour avant le lendemain); Clark Johnson, Nurse.Fighter.Boy; Stephen McHattie, Pontypool	Karine Vanasse, Polytechnique; Madeline Ivalu, Before Tomorrow (Le Jour avant le lendemain); Karen LeBlanc, Nurse.Fighter.Boy; Carinne Leduc, 3 Seasons (3 saisons); Gabrielle Rose, Mothers & Daughters
Actor in a supporting role	Actress in a supporting role
Maxim Gaudette, Polytechnique; Patrick Drolet, Father and Guns (De père en flic); John Dunsworth, Trailer Park Boys: Countdown to Liquor Day; Rémy Girard, Father and Guns (De père en flic); Scott Speedman, Adoration	Martha Burns, Love and Savagery; Liane Balaban, One Week; Marie Brassard, Heat Wave (Les grandes chaleurs); Isabel Richer, Babine; Sonia Vachon, 5150 Elm's Way (5150, rue des ormes)
Original Screenplay	Adapted Screenplay
Jacques Davidts, Polytechnique; David Bezmozgis, Victoria Day; Atom Egoyan, Adoration; Émile Gaudreault and Ian Lauzon, Father and Guns (De père en flic); Charles Officer and Ingrid Veninger, Nurse.Fighter.Boy	Kari Skogland, Fifty Dead Men Walking; Tony Burgess, Pontypool; Marie-Hélène Cousineau, Susan Avingaq and Madeline Ivalu, Before Tomorrow (Le Jour avant le lendemain)
Best Feature Length Documentary	Short Documentary
Kristina McLaughlin, Michael McMahon and Alan Zweig, A Hard Name; Larry Weinstein, Rudolf Biermann and Jessica Daniel, Inside Hana's Suitcase; Claude Demers, Ladies in Blue (Les dames en bleu); Patricia Aquino and Paul Saltzman, Prom Night in Mississippi; Mila Aung-Thwin, Kat Baulu, Brett Gaylor and Germaine Ying-Gee Wong, RiP: A Remix Manifesto	Kara Blake and Marie-Josée Saint-Pierre, The Delian Mode; Marie-Josée Saint-Pierre, Passages; Peter Mettler, Sandy Hunter and Laura Severinac, Petropolis: Aerial Perspectives on the Alberta Tar Sands
Best Live Action Short Drama	Best Animated Short
Pedro Pires and Catherine Chagnon, Danse Macabre; Constant Mentzas, Gilles; Élaine Hébert and Émile Proulx-Cloutier, Life Begins (La Vie commence); Dan Montgomery and Kazik Radwanski, Princess Margaret Blvd.; Ky Nam Le Duc, Land of Men (Terre des hommes)	Derek Mazur, Cordell Barker and Michael Scott, Runaway; Steven Hoban, Chris Landreth and Marcy Page, The Spine; Michael Fukushima, Bruce Alcock, Annette Clarke and Tina Ouellette, Vive la rose
Art Direction/Production Design	Cinematography
Eve Stewart, Fifty Dead Men Walking; Diana Abbatangelo, Nurse.Fighter.Boy; Susan Avingaq, Before Tomorrow (Le Jour avant le lendemain); Jean Babin, The Master Key (Grande Ourse: La Clé des possibles); Patrice Vermette, 1981	Pierre Gill, Polytechnique; Steve Cosens, Nurse.Fighter.Boy; Jonathan Freeman, Fifty Dead Men Walking; Ronald Plante, The Master Key (Grande Ourse: La Clé des possibles); Allen Smith, Sticky Fingers (Les doigts croches)
Costume Design	Editing
Atuat Akkitirq, Before Tomorrow (Le Jour avant le lendemain); Carmen Alie, The Master Key (Grande Ourse: La Clé des possibles); Sarah Armstrong, Nurse.Fighter.Boy; Brenda Broer, Cairo Time; Anne-Karine Gauthier, 1981	Richard Comeau, Polytechnique; Alain Baril, 5150 Elm's Way (5150, rue des ormes); Michel Grou, The Master Key (Grande Ourse: La Clé des possibles); Jim Munro, Fifty Dead Men Walking; François Normandin and Jim Donovan, 3 Seasons (3 saisons)
Overall Sound	Sound Editing
Stéphane Bergeron, Pierre Blain, Jo Caron and Benoît Leduc, Polytechnique; Simon Goulet and Bernard Gariépy Strobl, 5150 Elm's Way (5150, rue des ormes); Richard Lavoie, Arnaud Derimay, Jean-Charles Desjardins and Bernard Gariépy Strobl, Before Tomorrow (Le Jour avant le lendemain); Mario Auclair, Daniel Bisson, Luc Boudrias and Jean-Charles Desjardins, The Master Key (Grande Ourse: La Clé des possibles); Claude Hazanavicius, Daniel Bisson, Jean-Charles Desjardins and Bernard Gariépy Strobl, Love and Savagery	Claude Beaugrand, Guy Francoeur, Carole Gagnon and Christian Rivest, Polytechnique; Pierre-Jules Audet, Michelle Cloutier, Jacques Plante, Jean-François Sauvé, Nicolas Gagnon, The Master Key (Grande Ourse: La Clé des possibles); Mathieu Beaudin, Jérôme Décarie and Jacques Plante, 5150 Elm's Way (5150, rue des ormes); Garrett Kerr, Fred Brennan, Paul Germann, Steve Hammond and Mishann Lau, Nurse.Fighter.Boy; Olivier Calvert, Natalie Fleurant, Francine Poirier and Lise Wedlock, Babine
Achievement in Music: Original Score	Achievement in Music: Original Song
Normand Corbeil, The Master Key (Grande Ourse: La Clé des possibles); Benoît Charest, Polytechnique; Bertrand Chénier, Love and Savagery; Christian Clermont, 5150 Elm's Way (5150, rue des ormes); Ben Mink, Fifty Dead Men Walking	John Welsman and Cherie Camp, "Oh Love" — Nurse.Fighter.Boy; Susan Avingaq, "Pamani" —Before Tomorrow (Le Jour avant le lendemain); Sari Dajani, Iohann Martin, Rudy Toussaint and John Von Aichlinger, "Bon Swa" — Heat Wave (Les grandes chaleurs)
Achievement in Makeup	Special awards
Djina Caron and André Duval, The Master Key (Grande Ourse: La Clé des possibles); Robbi O'Quinn and Leanne Morrison, You Might As Well Live; Djina Caron and Martin Rivest, Polytechnique; Diane Simard and Réjean Goderre, Love and Savagery; Micheline Trépanier and Linda Gordon, 1981	Claude Jutra Award: Xavier Dolan, I Killed My Mother (J'ai tué ma mère); Golden Reel Award: Father and Guns (De père en flic)
