= Atuat Akkitirq =

Canadian filmmaker (1935–2022)

- Born: 1935; Igloolik, Nunavut, Canada
- Died: 2022 (aged 86–87)

Atuat Akkitirq (Inuktitut: ᐊᑐᐊᑦ ᐊᑭᑎᖅ, romanized: Atuat Akitiq; 1935–2022) was a Canadian filmmaker, actress and costume designer. A partner in the filmmaking collective Arnait Video Productions, she was a shortlisted Genie Award nominee for Best Costume Design at the 22nd Genie Awards in 2002 for Atanarjuat: The Fast Runner, and won the award at the 30th Genie Awards in 2010 for Before Tomorrow (Le Jour avant le lendemain).

She also had supporting roles as an actress in both Atanarjuat and The Journals of Knud Rasmussen, and was a co-director with Marie-Hélène Cousineau, Madeline Ivalu, Susan Avingaq and Mary Kunuk Iyyaraq of Arnait's 2001 documentary film Anaana. She has also taught management studies at Nunavut Arctic College.

In 2019, Atuat Akkitiriq was a laureate for the Indspire Lifetime Achievement Award.
