= Stéphane Rituit =

Canadian film and virtual reality producer

Stéphane Rituit is a Canadian film and virtual reality producer, who is the co-founder and chief executive officer of Montreal based immersive entertainment company Felix & Paul Studios.

== Career ==
=== Indigenous media work ===
Rituit began his professional career working with Inuit owned and community based media organizations including Isuma, Arnait Video Productions, Kingulliit Productions and the IsumaTV distribution platform. His work included producing feature films and documentaries focused on Inuit culture, community life and climate change, and supporting the online dissemination of Indigenous language and cultural media through IsumaTV.

His production credits include the feature film Before Tomorrow (2008), the climate change documentary Qapirangajuq: Inuit Knowledge and Climate Change (2010), and the documentary Sol (2014), which explored the circumstances surrounding the death of Solomon Uyarasuk in Nunavut. He also contributed to Kingulliit Productions’ documentary initiative Inuit Cree Reconciliation.

Before Tomorrow won the Best Canadian First Feature Film award at the 2008 Toronto International Film Festival, and received Genie and Jutra Award nominations. Sol won the Grand Prize for Best Canadian Feature at the Montreal International Documentary Festival, and was named to TIFF’s Canada's Top Ten list.

=== Felix & Paul Studios ===
In 2013, Rituit co founded Felix & Paul Studios with Félix Lajeunesse and Paul Raphaël. He serves as the studio’s chief executive officer.

The studio’s early VR projects included Strangers with Patrick Watson, which premiered at South by Southwest in 2014 and has been cited as one of the earliest examples of cinematic stereoscopic 360 degree VR filmmaking.

Rituit served as producer or executive producer on the VR documentary Traveling While Black (2019), and on the multi part VR series Space Explorers: The ISS Experience, filmed aboard the International Space Station in partnership with Time Studios. The series won the Primetime Emmy Award for Outstanding Interactive Program.

He is also an executive producer of Space Explorers: THE INFINITE, a touring large scale VR installation, and of Interstellar Arc, a permanent VR attraction that opened at AREA15 in Las Vegas in 2025.

== Awards and recognition ==
Award	Date of ceremony	Category	Work	Result	Ref.
Canadian Screen Awards	2020	Best Immersive Experience, Fiction	Gymnasia with Chris Lavis, Maciek Szczerbowski, Félix Lajeunesse, Paul Raphael, Dana Dansereau, Loc Dao, Rob McLaughlin, Patrick Watson	Won	
Emmy Awards	2021	Outstanding Interactive Program	Space Explorers: The ISS Experience	Won	
Genie Awards	2010	Best Motion Picture	Before Tomorrow (Le jour avant le lendemain)	Nominated	
Jutra Awards	2010	Best Film	Before Tomorrow (Le jour avant le lendemain) with Norman Cohn, Zacharias Kunuk	Nominated	

== Selected filmography ==
- The Journals of Knud Rasmussen (2006) - producer
- Before Tomorrow (2008) – producer
- Qapirangajuq: Inuit Knowledge and Climate Change (2010) – producer
- Uvanga (2013) – producer
- Sol (2014) – producer
- Traveling While Black (2019) – executive producer
- Space Explorers: The ISS Experience (2020) – executive producer
- Space Explorers: THE INFINITE (2021) – executive producer
- Interstellar Arc (2025) – executive producer
