= Cry Wolf (2005 film) =

2005 slasher film by Jeff Wadlow

- Theatrical release poster
- Directed by: Jeff Wadlow
- Written by: Jeff Wadlow; Beau Bauman
- Produced by: Beau Bauman
- Starring: Julian Morris; Lindy Booth; Jared Padalecki; Jon Bon Jovi; Gary Cole
- Cinematography: Romeo Tirone
- Edited by: Seth Lewis Gordon
- Music by: Michael Wandmacher
- Production company: Hypnotic
- Distributed by: Rogue Pictures
- Release date: September 16, 2005
- Running time: 90 minutes
- Country: United States
- Language: English
- Budget: $1 million
- Box office: $32.5 million

Cry Wolf (stylized as Cry_Wolf) is a 2005 American slasher film directed by Jeff Wadlow and co-written by Wadlow and Beau Bauman. The film stars Julian Morris, Jon Bon Jovi, Lindy Booth, Jared Padalecki and Gary Cole. It follows a group of teenagers at a remote elite boarding school who play a group parlor game called Cry Wolf by spreading rumors of a serial killer nicknamed "The Wolf". This leads to the discovery of a young woman's body on campus, putting the lives of those who played the game in legitimate danger. Cry Wolf was released in the United States on September 16, 2005, earning $32.5 million worldwide from a $1 million budget. It received largely negative reviews from critics.

== Plot ==
A group of prep school students consisting of Graham, Mercedes, Lewis, Randall, Regina, Tom, Dodger and Owen play a game called Cry Wolf, where someone is marked as a "wolf" and the group tries to figure out who it is.

After meeting his new journalism teacher, Mr. Walker, Owen and Tom meet the others for lunch. They discuss the police finding a girl's body, Becky, after it was dragged through the woods by a wolf. The group considers who could have murdered Becky, when Dodger proposes expanding Cry Wolf to the entire school. Owen suggests creating a fake e-mail telling everyone about a serial killer who goes from campus to campus stalking and killing students. They describe the killer as wearing an orange ski mask, a green camouflage jacket, steel toe combat boots, black tactical leather gloves, brandishing a hunting knife or a high-powered handgun. That night, they send out the e-mail.

The next day, the entire school has spread the story in the e-mail. Owen receives an instant message from someone using the name 'Wolf'. Tom and Owen accuse Dodger, but she claims she was studying with Regina.

Tom and Owen find their dorm room trashed. When the instant messenger comes up on Owen's laptop, they find a piercing stud and blood on Owen's keyboard. Tom blames Regina, who has a recipe for fake blood. When accused, she insists she was on a field trip.

Believing Dodger is lying, Owen confronts her. Dodger informs him that she was visiting her mother. Deciding that Randall is behind the odd behavior, Owen tries tracking him down, to no avail. Owen again seeks out Dodger, and finds her kissing Mr. Walker.

In his journalism class the next day, when Owen reaches into his bag for supplies, a hunting knife falls out. Mr. Walker escorts Owen to the Headmistress's office. Owen tells Mr. Walker that he knows about his relationship with Dodger, and that he will tell the headmistress if Walker reveals the knife. Mr. Walker agrees not to say anything.

On the night of Halloween, 'Wolf' attacks Owen. Thinking Tom was trying to prank him, Owen goes to leave with Tom's car, but sees Wolf behind him. The attacker ends up being Mercedes, who was trying to prove that attackers can be women.

The following day, Owen and Mercedes meet with the headmistress, who decides that Owen's fate will be decided over the weekend. The rest of the group is forced to stay at school over the weekend. Owen contacts them to meet in the chapel. Owen, Dodger, Tom, Lewis and Regina meet and try to get to the bottom of the attacks. While Lewis is on the phone, Mercedes is apparently attacked in the bathroom by Wolf. Lewis runs out as Owen tries to call for help.

Owen, Regina and Tom find Randall's body in a confessional. Owen goes looking for Dodger, and sees Lewis get attacked. Owen runs to the parking lot to see Mr. Walker still on campus. Owen runs to Mr. Walker's office as his phone rings. Owen answers to Dodger crying on the other end; she has found Mercedes dead. Dodger tells Owen she is coming and can see him through the window. He looks out to see Wolf kill her. Afterwards, Mr. Walker enters the room. Upon noticing that Mr. Walker has a jacket, an orange mask and a knife, Owen shoots him. The door is suddenly opened by Dodger, Tom and Regina.

Owen is arrested for murder while the group admits that it was a prank to get Mercedes and Owen back for making them stay on campus. Randall, Mercedes and Lewis are alive and well. Mr. Walker was involved with Becky, the gun in his desk having been used to kill her. Dodger visits Owen, who has been released on bail, and says she would never have played the game if she knew Mr. Walker was cheating on her, revealing she organized everything. Dodger killed Becky because she was jealous of Mr. Walker's relationship with her and had set up the game knowing that Owen would blame Mr. Walker for the killings, thereby killing him and making her happy. Despite Owen threatening to report her, Dodger replies that no one will believe him and leaves.

== Cast ==
- Julian Morris as Owen Matthews
- Lindy Booth as Dodger Allen
- Jared Padalecki as Tom Jordan
- Jon Bon Jovi as Rich Walker
- Sandra McCoy as Mercedes
- Paul James as Lewis
- Kristy Wu as Regina
- Jesse Janzen as Randall Hodge
- Ethan Cohn as Graham
- Gary Cole as Mr. Matthews
- Anna Deavere Smith as Headmaster Tinsley
- Erica Yates as Becky Roberts
- Ashley Davis as Laura
- Jane Beard as Miss McNally
- Michael Kennedy as Mr. Allen (Custodian)

== Production ==
In 2002, Chrysler sponsored an online contest called the Chrysler Million Dollar Film Festival wherein applicants could compete for the chance to win a $1 million production deal with Universal Pictures. The contest began at the 2002 Sundance Film Festival and continued throughout the year at various other film festivals until 2002 Cannes Film Festival wherein 10 semifinalists created short films that had to prominently feature Chrysler automobiles. Five finalists then were allowed to spend the Summer working with film industry veterans in crafting a pitch to showcase at the 2002 Toronto Film Festival. In September 2002, a panel consisting of Doug Liman, Freeman Thomas, and executives from Universal and Rogue Pictures determined then recent USC School of Cinematic Arts graduate Jeff Wadlow winner of the contest on the basis of his submitted short film Tower of Babel which he had created with classmate Beau Bauman and his pitch then titled Living the Lie which was described as a modern day retelling of The Boy Who Cried Wolf.

== Release ==
America Online also helped publicizing the film in July/August 2005; launching an alternate reality game for AIM users to play by sending instant messages to each other, which ran for the duration of the film's promotion. The game itself ran similarly to the popular game 'Mafia'; just replacing townspeople and mafia with sheep and wolves. The film was released theatrically in the United States on September 16, 2005. At the box office, Cry Wolf grossed $10 million in the US and $22.5 million internationally, for a worldwide total of $32.5 million.

At the Universal Cineplex, located at Universal Studios Florida, an actor was hired to dress up as the killer, and wander around the movie theater during the opening week of the film. There wasn't much reaction from patrons, though, as they were mostly just trying to get to their movie, and it was a slow time of the year for the theater and the park. A few patrons reported him as acting unusual, but the stunt was dubbed a small failure. The only other time Universal attempted a stunt like this is when the 2004 "Dawn of the Dead" came out, and actors were hired to play zombies, roaming around the theater, and jumping out to surprise patrons.

== Reception ==
Film review aggregator Rotten Tomatoes reported an approval rating of 22% based on 46 reviews, and a rating average of 4/10. The website's critics consensus reads: "Dull and derivative, Cry_Wolf is a subpar slasher that even ardent fans of the genre may find difficult to enjoy." The website Metacritic gave the film a weighted average score of 39 out of 100 based on 14 critics, indicating "generally unfavorable" reviews. Audiences polled by CinemaScore gave the film an average grade of "B−" on an A+ to F scale.

Writing for the magazine Variety, John Anderson said that "there are surprises intrinsic to the storyline [...]", but adding that "there’s not enough tension to make the viewer care that much for the various hoaxes and faux-slayings perpetrated by the film’s largely unlikable gang of privileged brats. In an era of increasingly sophisticated thrillers, “Cry Wolf" is a bit antique."

Ryan Larson, of the website Bloody Disgusting, praised the performance of Jon Bon Jovi and said that "diving deep into the production of this film is fascinating" and added that "Cry Wolf feels so 2000s in all the best and worst ways", but concluded that "being the mid-2000s, however, the film is also bogged down with homophobia and some outdated terminology that will make you cringe when watching."

In January 2023, Stacey Grant of teen magazine Seventeen ranked Cry Wolf as the eighth best teen movie of the 2000s out of seventeen films.

== See also ==
- List of films set around Halloween
