= Polytechnique (film) =

2009 film by Denis Villeneuve

- Theatrical release poster
- Directed by: Denis Villeneuve
- Written by: Jacques Davidts; Denis Villeneuve
- Produced by: Don Carmody; Maxime Rémillard
- Starring: Maxim Gaudette; Sebastien Huberdeau; Karine Vanasse; Evelyne Brochu; Johanne-Marie Tremblay; Pierre-Yves Cardinal
- Cinematography: Pierre Gill
- Edited by: Richard Comeau
- Music by: Benoit Charest
- Distributed by: Alliance Films; Remstar; Wild Bunch
- Release date: February 6, 2009
- Running time: 77 minutes
- Country: Canada
- Languages: French; English
- Budget: $6 million
- Box office: $1.4 million

Polytechnique is a 2009 Canadian tragedy film directed by Denis Villeneuve and written by Villeneuve and Jacques Davidts. Starring Maxim Gaudette, Sebastien Huberdeau, and Karine Vanasse, the film is based on the 1989 École Polytechnique massacre and re-enacts the events of the incident through the eyes of two students (Huberdeau and Vanasse) who witness a gunman (Gaudette) murder fourteen young women.

After a release in Quebec in February 2009, it was featured in the 2009 Cannes Film Festival. It received numerous honours, including nine Genie Awards, notably Best Motion Picture.

== Plot ==
On December 6, 1989, a young man prepares his Ruger Mini-14 and leaves a message for his mother. He then goes to Polytechnique Montreal, an engineering school, and enters a classroom during class with the Ruger Mini-14. He orders the men to leave and the women to stay. They comply after he shoots into the ceiling to show that he is serious. He tells the women that he hates feminists. Although the women deny being feminists, he shoots at them, killing some and wounding others. He then moves through corridors and the cafeteria, specifically targeting women.

One of the male students is Jean-François, who was ordered to leave the classroom. Instead of fleeing the scene, he returns to try to stop the killer and/or help the victims. Valérie and Stéphanie, two surviving women, play dead thinking the killer has returned, although Stéphanie later dies of her injuries.

Finally, the killer reaches another classroom where he kills a female lecturer. He then commits suicide, and his blood mixes with the blood of his victim.

Some time after the massacre, Jean-François, feeling guilty for complying with the order to leave the classroom and abandoning the women, commits suicide by carbon monoxide poisoning. Valérie, wearing the Iron Ring, the professional ring of Canadian engineers, learns she is pregnant. She makes plans to tell a potential son to be loving or a potential daughter that the world belongs to her.

== Cast ==
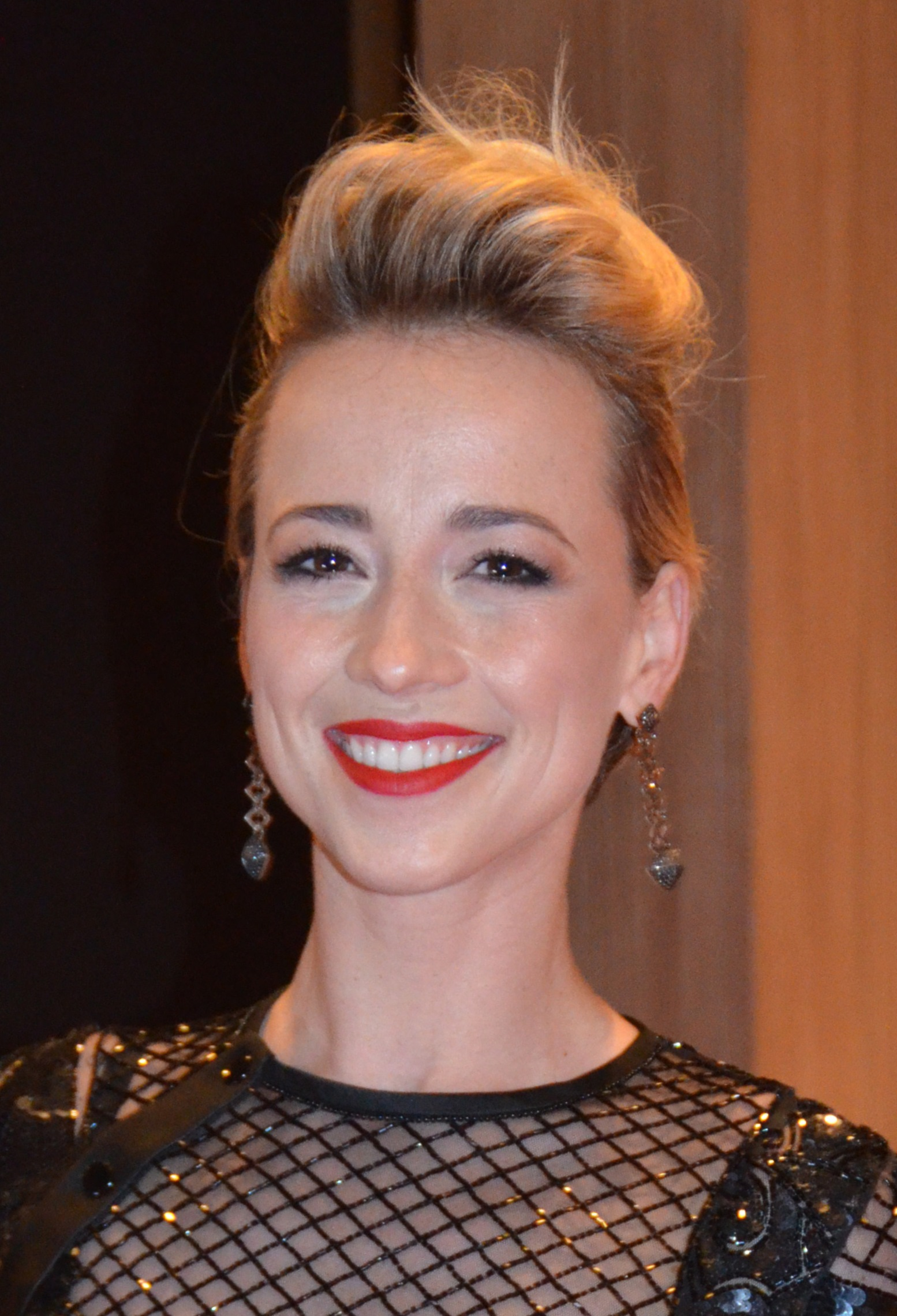
Karine Vanasse stars as Valérie and helped produce the film

- Maxim Gaudette as The Killer
- Sébastien Huberdeau as Jean-François
- Karine Vanasse as Valérie
- Evelyne Brochu as Stéphanie
- Johanne-Marie Tremblay as Jean-François' mother
  - Natalie Hamel-Roy as Jean-François' mother (voice)
- Pierre-Yves Cardinal as Éric

The rest of the cast listed alphabetically:

- Marie-Evelyne Baribeau as Student
- Mireille Brullemans as Admission Office's secretary
- Larissa Corriveau as the Killer's neighbour
- Sophie Desmarais as Female Student (3rd floor corridor)
- Jonathan Dubsky as Frightened Student
- Marina Eva as Student at the party
- Emmanuelle Girard as Student behind speakers
- Nathalie Girard as Injured student
- Adam Kosh as the Killer's roommate
- Manon Lapointe as the Killer's mother
- Pierre-Xavier Martel as Security Agent
- Anne Trudel as Student behind speakers

== Production ==
=== Development ===
Karine Vanasse, who played Valérie, helped produce Polytechnique, and wanted to make a film about the massacre for years. She helped secure director Denis Villeneuve for the film, who at the time was respected for making the 2000 film Maelström. Despite the sensitivity to the incident in Quebec, Villeneuve asserted it was not too soon for a film, and that there was an important conversation to be had.

Vanasse researched by speaking to the families of women killed in École Polytechnique de Montréal. In the film, one of the women tells The Killer that the students are not feminists, with Vanasse explaining, "One of the women who was there told me that it was the first time in her life that she had to confront her femininity head on".

=== Filming ===
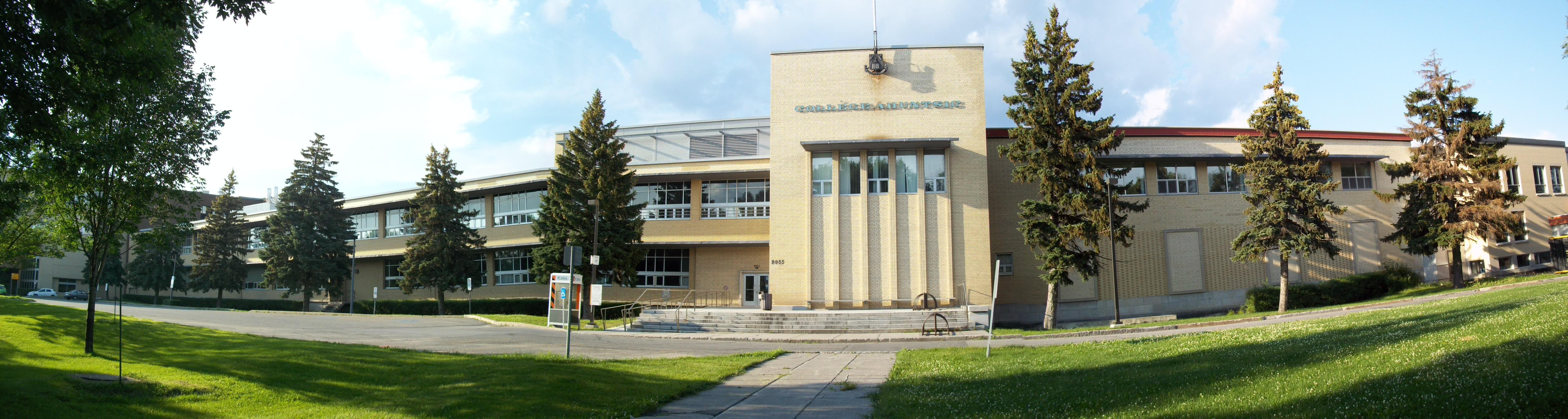
Collège Ahuntsic was a filming location

École Polytechnique de Montréal gave the filmmakers the right to use the campus as a location, but Villeneuve opted against filming there to be respectful. The film was shot at Cégep de Maisonneuve and Collège Ahuntsic as well as Griffintown and Westmount. Villeneuve shot the film in black and white, so as to avoid the presence of blood on screen.

There were two versions of the film produced, one in English and one in French. The director Denis Villeneuve hoped the film would enter into the English-Canadian market, as well as the U.S. one. Villeneuve said the subject matter was challenging for the cast and crew to work with.

== Release ==
Polytechnique was screened at the Directors' Fortnight at the 2009 Cannes Film Festival on 17 May. It was also featured in festivals in London, Spain and Namur in fall 2009.

The film was released on 6 February 2009, in Quebec, and on 20 March 2009 in Toronto, Vancouver and Calgary. Its release sparked controversy in Quebec and across Canada for its depiction of real life events involving the murder of unarmed students. The film was shown in 45 theatres in Quebec. By August 2009, the distributor Remstar had sold screening rights to around 12 countries.

Alliance Films and Remstar released the film on DVD and Blu-ray in August 2009, along with French language documentary films on the real massacre. It was showcased in the Museum of Modern Art in New York City in summer 2011.

== Reception ==
=== Box office ===
The film grossed $326,000 in Quebec cinemas during its opening weekend, ranking first at the Quebec box office. In English Canadian areas, it grossed $100,000. It was considered a financial hit in Quebec.

=== Critical response ===
The film has received mostly positive reviews from film critics. Review aggregator Rotten Tomatoes reports that 88% of professional critics gave the film a positive review based on 17 reviews, with an average rating of 6.98/10. On Metacritic, the film has a weighted average score of 63 out of 100 based on 6 critics, indicating "generally favorable reviews". In Canada, Peter Howell of the Toronto Star gave the film three and a half stars out of four, stating "Polytechnique makes no judgments, offers no panaceas. It shows the violence, faithfully recreating the historical record, but it doesn't wallow in it. Pierre Gill's brilliant monochrome lensing minimizes the effect of the blood. [...] It stands as a work of art, summoning unspoken thoughts the way Picasso's war abstraction Guernica does in a scene of contemplation with Jean-François." Katherine Monk of Canwest News Services gave the film four stars out of five; "The paradox may sound grotesque, but it must be stated loud and clear: Denis Villeneuve and the cast of Polytechnique have transformed the tragedy of the Montreal Massacre into a work of profound beauty."

Critics compared Polytechnique, favorably and/or unfavorably, to Gus Van Sant's Palme d'Or winning 2003 film Elephant. (Note: Examples: A.O. Scott: "The way horror erupts into the routines of an ordinary day, in drab, functional, institutional spaces — we know this from news reports, from our own imaginations and from movies like Gus Van Sant's Elephant, a film loosely based on the Columbine High School shootings that casts an ambiguous shadow over Polytechnique."; Rob Nelson: "A weaker Elephant, Quebecois director Denis Villeneuve’s school-shooting drama Polytechnique nevertheless distinguishes itself".; D. Seguin: "Like Gus Van Sant's Elephant, Polytechnique is a formalist interpretation of an atrocity, with a cool perspective on the events and much for audiences to read between the frames as the film moves back and forth through time.") In The New York Times, A.O. Scott wrote that like Villeneuve's later film Incendies, Polytechnique was a statement on decency being more powerful than savagery, and benefited from a rational look on an extreme matter. In Variety, Rob Nelson compared it unfavourably to Halloween (1978) and other violent horror films, but gave it marks for addressing the misogyny of the crime. Ray Bennett criticized the film in The Hollywood Reporter for not examining the psychology of The Killer, and could not understand why the characters did not pull the fire alarm. Denis Seguin of Screen Daily gave the film a favourable review, writing "Polytechnique is a formalist interpretation of an atrocity, with a cool perspective on the events and much for audiences to read between the frames as the film moves back and forth through time." Time Out gave it four stars, saying it avoided tabloid journalism and foreshadowed the message of forgiveness in the face of horror in Incendies.

=== Accolades ===
In presenting the Rogers Best Canadian Film Award to Polytechnique in January 2010, Toronto Film Critics Association president Brian D. Johnson called it a "film of astonishing courage."

Award	Date of ceremony	Category	Recipient(s)	Result	Ref(s)
Genie Awards	12 April 2010	Best Motion Picture	Maxime Rémillard and Don Carmody	Won	
Genie Awards	12 April 2010	Best Direction	Denis Villeneuve	Won	
Genie Awards	12 April 2010	Best Actress	Karine Vanasse	Won	
Genie Awards	12 April 2010	Best Supporting Actor	Maxim Gaudette	Won	
Genie Awards	12 April 2010	Best Original Screenplay	Jacques Davidts	Won	
Genie Awards	12 April 2010	Best Cinematography	Pierre Gill	Won	
Genie Awards	12 April 2010	Best Editing	Richard Comeau	Won	
Genie Awards	12 April 2010	Best Overall Sound	Stéphane Bergeron, Pierre Blain, Jo Caron and Benoit Leduc	Won	
Genie Awards	12 April 2010	Best Sound Editing	Claude Beaugrand, Guy Francoeur, Carole Gagnon and Christian Rivest	Won	
Genie Awards	12 April 2010	Best Score	Benoît Charest	Nominated	
Genie Awards	12 April 2010	Best Makeup	Djina Caron and Martin Rivest	Nominated	
Jutra Awards	28 March 2010	Best Film	Maxime Rémillard and Don Carmody	Nominated	
Jutra Awards	28 March 2010	Best Direction	Denis Villeneuve	Won	
Jutra Awards	28 March 2010	Best Supporting Actor	Maxim Gaudette	Won	
Jutra Awards	28 March 2010	Best Cinematography	Pierre Gill	Won	
Jutra Awards	28 March 2010	Best Editing	Richard Comeau	Won	
Jutra Awards	28 March 2010	Best Sound	Pierre Blain, Claude Beaugrand and Stéphane Bergeron	Won	
Jutra Awards	28 March 2010	Best Original Music	Benoît Charest	Nominated	
Toronto Film Critics Association	16 December 2009	Best Canadian Film		Won	
