= Sean Panting =

Canadian musician (born 1970)

Personal details
- Born: 14 May 1970 (age 56)
- Occupation: Songwriter, musician and actor
- Website: Spotify https://open.spotify.com/artist/0mhtg7tiv3py69c6D1lQB6

Sean Panting is a songwriter, musician and actor based in St. John's, Newfoundland and Labrador.

== Career ==
Panting is a founding member of the iconic Newfoundland bands Drive and Kelly Russell & The Planks. Between 2000 and 2020, he has released six albums of original songs; the most recent, The Simple Machines, was released on February 22, 2020. Panting's writing often draws comparisons with Elvis Costello, The Who's Pete Townsend, and former Hüsker Dü and Sugar front man Bob Mould, among others.

As an actor, he is best known for his portrayal of morally bankrupt barrister Walter McLean on CBC Television's Republic of Doyle.

Panting unsuccessfully ran in the 2015 provincial election as a candidate for the district of Mount Scio, as a member of the Newfoundland and Labrador New Democratic Party. His father Gerry Panting led the Newfoundland NDP from 1974 to 1977.

== Discography ==
- Prevail (1994) – Drive
- Blink (1996) – Drive
- Jehovah's Witness Protection Program (1998) – Drive
- Smashed Hits (1999) - Kelly Russell and The Planks
- Lotus Land (2000) - Sean Panting
- Trad (2001) - The Panting Brothers
- Pop Disaster (2002) - Sean Panting
- Receiver (2005) - Sean Panting
- Victrola (2005) – Sean Panting
- Boy on Bridge (2011) - Alan Doyle
- Man of the Year (2011) – Sean Panting
- The Simple Machines (2020) – Sean Panting

== Films and television ==
- The Bread Maker (2003)
- Heyday (2006)
- Behind the Wall (2008)
- Grown Up Movie Star (2009)
- Love and Savagery (2009)
- Diverted (2009)
- The Grand Seduction (2013)
- Republic of Doyle (TV 2010–2014)
- Hudson and Rex (TV 2018)
- Skeet (2024)
