= 3 Seasons =

- Directed by: Jim Donovan
- Written by: Jim Donovan; Carinne Leduc
- Produced by: Maude Bouchard; Jim Donovan; Sandy Martinez; Bruno Rosato
- Starring: Carinne Leduc; Caroline Néron; Romano Orzari; Frank Schorpion; Shawn Baichoo
- Cinematography: Jean-Pierre Gauthier
- Music by: Laurent Eyquem
- Production company: Alliage 3 Entertainment
- Distributed by: Locomontion Distributions
- Release dates: December 2008 (Whistler Film Festival); January 23, 2009 (Canada)
- Running time: 100 minutes
- Country: Canada
- Languages: French; English; Italian

3 Seasons (French: 3 saisons) is a 2009 Canadian psychological drama, directed and written by Jim Donovan.

The film was produced on a minimalist budget with support of the Canada Council for the Arts and Comedians. The story follows the lives of two couples experiencing an unexpected life change, as well as a middle-aged father seeking revenge for his life's misfortune. Leader Post summaries this film as " a gritty, multi-layered drama about the intersecting lives of two Montreal couples and a grieving middle-aged father visiting from Alberta. With pregnancy and parenthood as the unifying themes, the movie covers a period of nine months, evoking both the three seasons of the title and the length of a normal pregnancy". The three stories transect and reflect each other, displaying the same themes within similar but different situations. With a small audience range of 700 spectators in theatres, the film succeeded winning many rewards and achievements.

== Plot ==
The film highlights three different stories. These stories unfold over the course of nine months. Two couples live completely opposite lives of each other, yet share one commonality: an unexpected pregnancy. The main characters, Carmine and Sasha live in a carefree and comfortable world and the arrival of a child shakes up their conventional life: behind their illusion of a fancy condominium and their successful careers hides a couple that is living in pain, secrets and lies. Simultaneously, the other couple within the film, Justine and Seb are freedom seekers that live day by day on the streets of Montreal. These two young squeegee kids live in hopes of a better future, but in the meantime seem to be content with part-time jobs; such as washing windshields and doing small-time deals. Justine's pregnancy catches Seb off guard as he is not ready to be a father. The history of violence in their relationship makes getting an abortion the obvious choice, however things worsen and turn out differently. In the third story, Stephen Decker is a 50-something father who has lost everything, his wife, his only child, and his inner peace. Now he has found a new purpose for his life: revenge, which brings him from Calgary to Montreal as he attempts to hunt down his daughter's murderer. What he finds is far from what he expected, and five destinies converge, for better and for worse.

== Director ==
The film was written and directed by Jim Donovan. He was born in Montreal and spent most of his life there before he moved to Toronto in early 2010, to work on the television series Flashpoint. In 2013 Donovan was presented with a Canadian Screen Award for best director for his work on such television show. In 2014 Donovan was nominated for a Directors Guild of Canada award for Best Drama Television Series, for the program Cracked; Ghost Dance.

Donovan was commended for his work on 3 Seasons. As director, co-producer, co-editor and co-script writer along with his actress wife Leduc, Jim took sole responsibility for the amount of success the film received. The film " was praised as best film within its budget during the 2010 Genie Awards". Many news and media outlets covered this film and praised the success on such minimum budget, platforms such as, CanWest News, Vancouver Sun, and the Gazette. Bruno Rosato a Montreal-based movie producer claimed "This has to be one of the great underdog stories in film here in years."

== Achievements ==
- 2009 Mexico International Film Festival Golden Palm Award - Best Director - Won
- 2008 Whistler Film Festival Borsos Competition - Best Actress - Carinne Leduc - Won
- 2008 Whistler Film Festival Best New Canadian Feature Film - Jim Donovan - Won
- 2010 Genie Award for Best Motion Picture - Nominee
- 2010 Best Feature at the 2010 Beverly Hills Film Festival- Won
