= Craig Olejnik =

Canadian actor

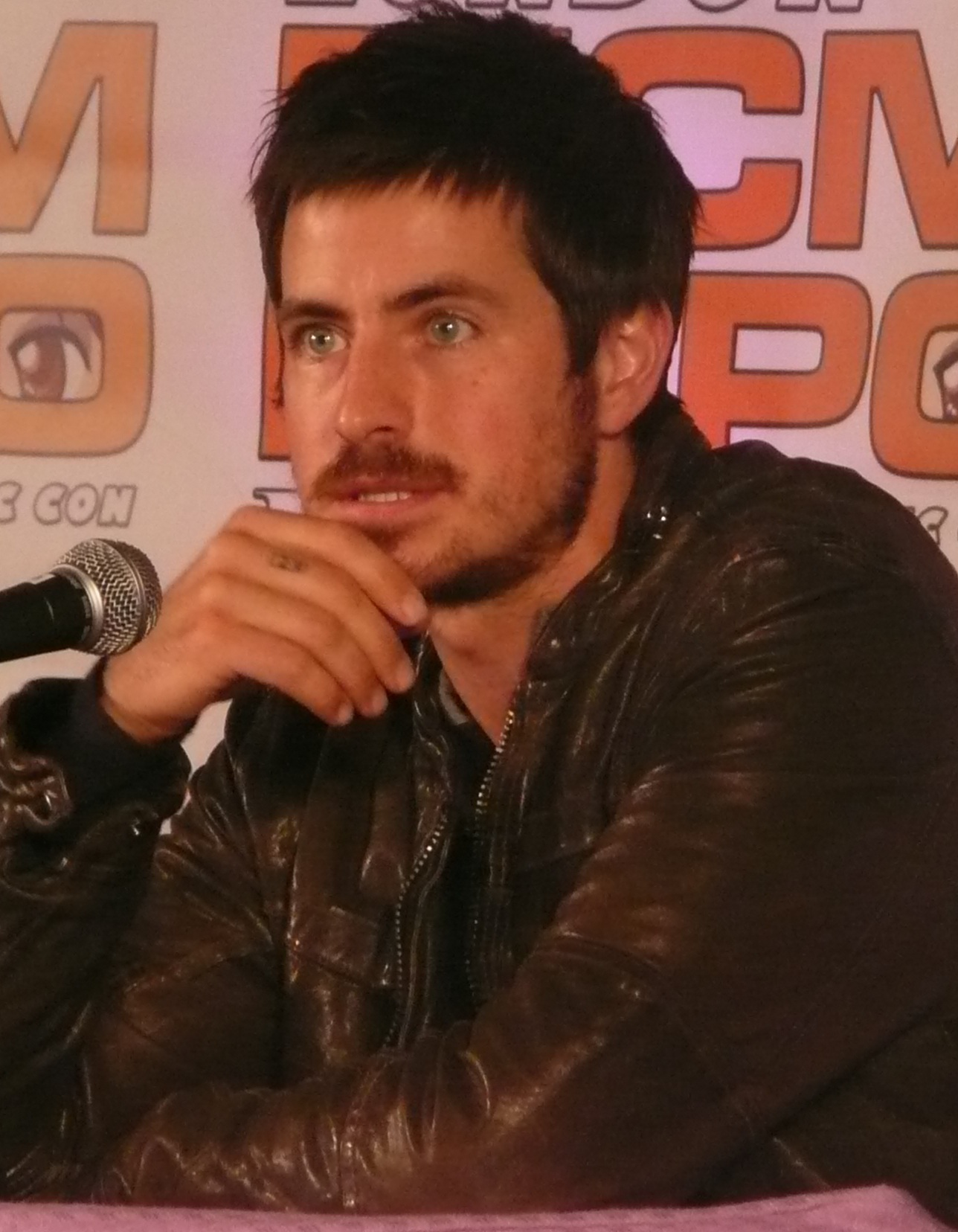
- Olejnik at the MCM Expo London, 2011
- Occupation: Actor
- Years active: 1995–present
- Spouse: Faviola Pérez (m. 2018)

Craig Olejnik is a Canadian actor.

== Early life and education ==
Olejnik graduated from West Kings District High School in Auburn, Nova Scotia. His father was in the military. His grandparents immigrated to Canada from Poland.

== Career ==
Olejnik is known for his lead role in the television series The Listener as Toby Logan, a paramedic with the power to read minds by hearing others' thoughts and seeing events that happened to them from their point of view. His previous work includes Runaway, Thir13en Ghosts, Margaret's Museum and Wolf Lake. He is also the director, writer and producer of the film Interview with a Zombie.

== Filmography ==
=== Film ===
Year	Title	Role	Notes
1995	Margaret's Museum	Jimmy MacNeil	
1999	Teen Sorcery	Michael Charming	Video
2001	Thirteen Ghosts	Royce Clayton, The Torn Prince	
2002	Flower & Garnet	Carl	
2005	Interview with a Zombie	Interviewer	Short
2009	The Timekeeper (L'Heure de vérité)	Martin Bishop	
2016	Wake Up	Mr. Bowman / Additional voices	Short

=== Television ===
Year	Title	Role	Notes
2001	So Weird	Zach Stewart	"Mr. Magnetism"
2001	Wolf Lake	Sean	"Meat the Parents", "Soup to Nuts"
2006	Runaway	Jake Bennett	Recurring role
2006	Obituary	Luke	TV film
2007	In God's Country	Frank	TV film
2009–2014	The Listener	Toby Logan	Main role
2011 & 2026	Murdoch Mysteries	Nicholas Jenkins / Joseph Cutter	"Downstairs, Upstairs" & "Fire in the Sky"
2013	Haven	Aiden Driscoll	"Crush"
2013	Republic of Doyle	Grant Pritchard	"Young Guns"
2015	Christmas Truce	John Myers	TV film
2017	Eyewitness	Louis Allen	TV film
2017	Real Detective	Det. Bob Creed	"The Riverside Killer"
2017	Girlfriends' Guide to Divorce	Sensei Rex	"Run Toward What Scares You", "The Cat Is Always on the Roof" & "Just Survive"
