= Lindy Booth =

Canadian actress (born 1979)

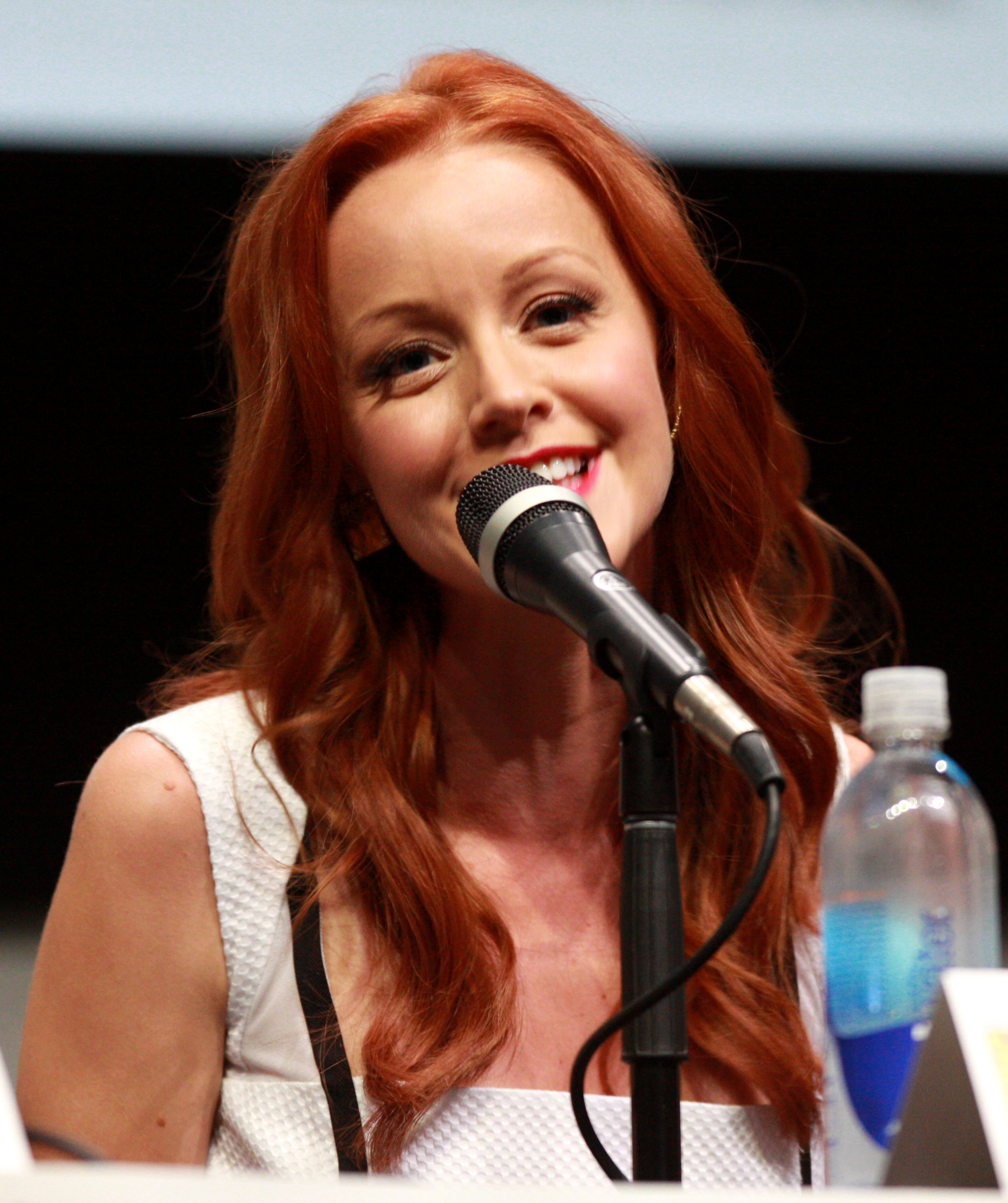
- Booth at the 2013 San Diego Comic-Con
- Born: April 2, 1979 (age 47); Oakville, Ontario, Canada
- Occupation: Actress
- Years active: 1998–present
- Spouse: Jeff Wadlow (m. 2014; div. 2020)

Lindy Booth (born April 2, 1979) is a Canadian actress. She played Riley Grant on the Disney Channel series The Famous Jett Jackson (and Agent Hawk in the show-within-a-show Silverstone), Claudia on Relic Hunter, and A.J. Butterfield on the NBC series The Philanthropist. She then played Cassandra Cillian on the TNT series The Librarians (2014–2018).

== Early life ==
Booth was born in Oakville, Ontario, on April 2, 1979.

== Career ==
=== Film ===
In 2001, Booth starred in the Canadian ensemble drama Century Hotel, and in 2002 she co-starred in the Canadian comedy film Rub & Tug. Booth starred as Dodger Allen in the 2005 movie Cry Wolf, appeared in the 2004 remake Dawn of the Dead as Nicole, and had a role in Wrong Turn with Eliza Dushku. In 2008, Booth starred in the thriller film Behind the Wall (originally titled The Wall).

Booth had a supporting role in the film Kick-Ass 2 (2013), playing Night Bitch.

=== Television ===
Booth starred in a number of television series earlier in her career. She contemporaneously played Riley Grant on the Disney Channel series The Famous Jett Jackson (and Agent Hawk in the show-within-a-show Silverstone) and its follow-up television movie Jett Jackson: The Movie, and Claudia on the syndicated television series Relic Hunter, from 1999–2001. She portrayed Lana Turner in the television film Life with Judy Garland: Me and My Shadows (2001).

Her other television credits include guest starring as different characters in two 2002 episodes of the A&E Network series A Nero Wolfe Mystery ("Before I Die" and "Poison à la Carte"), and a recurring role in season two of the USA Network series The 4400. She guest starred on such television shows as CSI: NY and Ghost Whisperer. She played Stephanie Goodison in the second episode of the Syfy television series Warehouse 13.

Originally cast in a recurring role, Booth was later promoted to a main role on the 2007–08 ABC drama October Road for the show's second season. In 2009, she played A.J. Butterfield on the short-lived NBC series The Philanthropist.

In 2013, Booth had a short recurring stint on the BBC America drama Copper. In 2014, Booth was cast in a starring role on the television series The Librarians, which aired on TNT.

In June 2023, it was announced that Metropolis, a miniseries adaptation of Fritz Lang’s classic silent era sci-fi film to be directed and written by Sam Esmail with Booth in a major role, would not be moving forward.

== Filmography ==
=== Film ===
Year	Title	Role	Notes
1999	Teenage Space Vampires	Katie	
1999	Detroit Rock City	Girl #1	
2001	Century Hotel	Sylvia / Supergirl	
2002	Winter Sun	Zoe	Short film
2002	The Skulls II	Kelly	Direct-to-video film
2002	American Psycho 2	Cassandra Blaire	Direct-to-video film
2002	Fairytales and Pornography	Laura	
2002	Rub & Tug	Lea	
2002	Bollywood/Hollywood	Unknown	Uncredited
2003	Wrong Turn	Francine Childes	
2003	Hollywood North	Molly	
2003	Public Domain	Monica	
2004	Dawn of the Dead	Nicole	
2004	choke.	Andrea	
2005	Lucid	Sophie	
2005	Cry Wolf	Dodger Allen	
2007	Nobel Son	Beth Chapman	
2008	What Just Happened	Hostess	
2008	Dark Honeymoon	Kathryn	Direct-to-video film
2008	Behind the Wall	Katelyn Parks	
2013	Kick-Ass 2	Miranda Swedlow / Night Bitch	
2019	The Creatress	Eryn Bellow	

=== Television ===
Year	Title	Role	Notes
1998	Mr. Music	Amy White	Television film
1998	Eerie, Indiana: The Other Dimension	Carrie Taylor	Main role
1999	Psi Factor: Chronicles of the Paranormal	Gloria	Episode: "School of Thought"
1999	Strange Justice	Margaret	Television film (Showtime)
1999–2001	Relic Hunter	Claudia	Main role (seasons 1–2)
1999–2001	The Famous Jett Jackson	Riley Grant / Agent Hawk	Recurring role, 12 episodes
2000	Traders	Elizabeth Watson	Episode: "Money Shot"
2000	Twice in a Lifetime	17-Year-Old Caitlin Taylor	Episode: "Pride and Prejudice"
2000	Earth: Final Conflict	Gina Richardson	Episode: "The Fields"
2000	Big Wolf on Campus	Charlotte	Episode: "Pleased to Eat You"
2001	Jett Jackson: The Movie	Riley Grant / Agent Hawk	Television film Disney Channel Original Movie
2001	Life with Judy Garland: Me and My Shadows	Lana Turner	Television mini-series (ABC)
2002	Her Best Friend's Husband	Kelly Roberts	Television film (Lifetime)
2002	A Nero Wolfe Mystery	Peggy Choate / Beulah Page	Episodes: "Poison à la Carte", "Before I Die"
2002	Mutant X	Diana Moller	Episode: "Time Squared"
2002	Strange Days at Blake Holsey High	Amanda Durst	Episode: "Fate"
2002	A Christmas Visitor	Liz	Television film (Hallmark)
2002–2003	Odyssey 5	Holly Culverson	Recurring role, 7 episodes
2003	Veritas: The Quest	Fiona Keiran	Episode: "Avalon"
2003	The Twilight Zone	Shannon	Episode: "The Pharaoh's Curse"
2003	Platinum	Penny	Episode: "Peace"
2003	Starhunter	Serena DeLuna	Episode: "Torment"
2004	Cooking Lessons	Chloe	Unsold television pilot
2005	The 4400	Liv	3 episodes
2005	Category 7: The End of the World	Brigid	Television film (CBS)
2005	Christmas in Boston	Ellen	Television film (ABC Family)
2006	CSI: NY	Tess Larson	Episode: "Open and Shut"
2006	Ghost Whisperer	Lanie	Episode: "A Vicious Cycle"
2007–2008	October Road	Emily, The Pizza Girl	Main role
2008	Cold Case	Gloria Flagstone	Episode: "Wings"
2009	Warehouse 13	Stephanie Goodison	Episode: "Resonance"
2009	The Philanthropist	A.J. Butterfield	Main role
2009	NCIS	Amanda Barrow	Episode: "Endgame"
2011	Brain Trust	Professor Monica Ashton	Unsold television pilot
2011	Republic of Doyle	Rebecca Jones	Episode: "Live and Let Doyle"
2011	Christmas Magic	Carrie Blackford	Television film (Hallmark)
2012	Fairly Legal	Rachel	Episode: "Finale"
2013	The Twelve Trees of Christmas	Cheri Jamison	Television film (Lifetime)
2013	Supernatural	Bonnie Fuschau / Vesta	Episode: "Rock and a Hard Place"
2013	Copper	Teresa Trembley	3 episodes
2014–2018	The Librarians	Cassandra Cillian	Main role Also directed episode: "... and Some Dude Named Jeff"; Nominated – Golden Maple Award for Best actress in a TV series broadcast in the U.S. (2016)
2016	The Sound of Christmas	Lizzy	Television film (Hallmark Movies & Mysteries)
2017	Rocky Mountain Christmas	Sarah	Television film (Hallmark Movies & Mysteries)
2017	Trapped by My Father's Killer also called Eyewitness	Diana	Television Film (Lifetime)
2018	Under the Autumn Moon	Alex	Television film (Hallmark)
2019	SnowComing	Samantha	Television film (Hallmark)
2019	Stumptown	Penny Landsdale Harris	Episode: "Dex Education"
2020	Swept Up By Christmas	Gwen	Television Film (Hallmark)
2020	Grey's Anatomy	Hadley	3 episodes
2021	The Flash	Vanya Davis	Episodes: "Armageddon, Part 1", "Keep It Dark"
2022	Star Trek: Strange New Worlds	Alora	Episode: "Lift Us Where Suffering Cannot Reach"
2023	Gotham Knights	Jane Doe	Episode: "Daddy Issues"
2024	Tracker	Connie King	Episode: "Out of the Past"
2026	The Librarians: The Next Chapter	Cassandra Cillian	Episode: "... and the Toy Phone"
