= Arnait Video Productions =

Inuit women's filmmaking collective

Arnait Video Productions (Women's Video Workshop of Igloolik) is a women's filmmaking collective that aims to value the voices of Inuit women in debates of interest to all Canadians. Arnait is related to Isuma Productions.

== History ==
Arnait was founded in 1991 by Marie-Hélène Cousineau, Madeline Ivalu, Susan Avingaq, Mary Kunuk Iyyiraq and Atuat Akkitirq. It was originally named Arnait Ikajurtigiit (Inuktitut: Women helping each other), and focuses on documenting women's experience and community in Nunavut.

Susan Avingaq describes Arnait as: "a women's video workshop [that] can help people communicate with each other. That can be useful. It can make them understand. A long time ago, just with words and language, people believed stories and legends, they saw pictures in their imagination. Our stories are useful and unforgettable".

== Productions ==
As with Isuma, Arnait's work spans interviews, short ethnographic videos on traditional activities, television series, feature documentaries and narrative feature films. Their first narrative feature Before Tomorrow (Le Jour avant le lendemain) was adapted by Danish writer Jørn Riel from the novel For morgendagen. It premiered in Igloolik in 2008 in front of the community involved in its making. It received nine Canadian Genie Award nominations, including Best Picture, Best Director, Best Actress, Best Actor, Adapted Screenplay, Art Direction, Costumes, Sound, Original Song, and four Jutra Awards: Best Picture, Director, Costumes, Music.

Uvanga premiered at the Festival du Nouveau Cinéma in September 2013, toured internationally to film festivals including the Berlinale, and had a theatrical release in Canada in summer 2014.

In 2014, Arnait started production on Sol, a documentary prompted by the supposed suicide of 26-year-old musician Solomon Uyarasuk in a Royal Canadian Mounted Police jail cell. The film subsequently won the Grand Prize for Best Canadian Feature at the RIDM Montreal International Documentary Festival and was included in the list of Canada's Top Ten feature films of 2014, selected by a panel of filmmakers and industry professionals organized by TIFF.

=== Short works ===
- Ningiura (Grandmother)
- Qulliq
- Attagutaaluk Starvation
- Piujuq
- Angutautaq

=== Features ===
- Anaana (Mother)
- Unakuluk (Dear Little One)
- Before Tomorrow (Le Jour avant le lendemain), 2008
- Uvanga, 2013
- Sol, 2014
- Tia and Piujuq, 2018
- Restless River, 2019
