= Heat Wave (2009 Canadian film) =

- French: Les Grandes chaleurs
- Directed by: Sophie Lorain
- Written by: Michel Marc Bouchard
- Produced by: Valérie Bissonnette; Christian Larouche
- Starring: Marie-Thérèse Fortin; François Arnaud
- Cinematography: Alexis Durand-Brault
- Edited by: Pierre Moffatt
- Production company: Les Films Séville
- Release date: 28 August 2009
- Running time: 99 minutes
- Country: Canada
- Language: French

Heat Wave (French: Les Grandes chaleurs) is a 2009 Canadian romantic comedy film directed by Sophie Lorain. The film stars Marie-Thérèse Fortin as Gisèle, a widowed social worker who falls in love with Yannick (François Arnaud), one of her clients.

== Cast ==
- Marie-Thérèse Fortin - Gisèle Couture
- François Arnaud - Yannick Ménard
- Marie Brassard - Marjo
- François Létourneau - Louis
- Véronique Beaudet - Louisette
- Yvan Benoît - Laurent
- Sophie Desmarais - Naomie
- Claudia Ferri - Dolores
- Maxime Dumontier - Julien-Carl
- Maxime Côté - Jérémie

== Awards ==
Award	Date of ceremony	Category	Recipient(s)	Result	Ref(s)
Genie Awards	2010	Best Supporting Actress	Marie Brassard	Nominated	
Genie Awards	2010	Best Original Song	Sari Dajani, Iohann Martin, Rudy Toussaint, John Von Aichlinger "Bon Swa"	Nominated	
Jutra Awards	2010	Best Actress	Marie-Thérèse Fortin	Nominated	
