= The Disappearance (2017 TV series) =

Canadian television drama miniseries

- Genre: Drama; Mystery
- Written by: Normand Daneau; Geneviève Simard
- Directed by: Peter Stebbings
- Country of origin: Canada
- Original language: English
- No. of seasons: 1
- No. of episodes: 6

Production
- Executive producers: Joanne Forgues; Sophie Parizeau; Jean-Marc Casanova
- Producers: Joanne Forgues; Catherine Faucher
- Production companies: Productions Casablanca; Bell Media; NBC Universal International Studios

Original release
- Network: CTV
- Release: October 1 – November 5, 2017

The Disappearance is a Canadian television drama miniseries, which premiered on CTV in October 2017. Centred on the disappearance of a young boy, the series stars Peter Coyote, Camille Sullivan, Aden Young, Joanne Kelly and Micheline Lanctôt. It later premiered in the UK on the Universal in February 2018. It premiered in the United States on July 9, 2019 on WGN America.

The series was first developed in 2011 as a French language project written by Normand Daneau and Geneviève Simard, but after Productions Casablanca was unable to sell it to any of Quebec's francophone television networks they opted to translate the scripts into English, and were successful in pitching the series to Bell Media.

The series was directed by Peter Stebbings.

The series received several Canadian Screen Award nominations at the 6th Canadian Screen Awards, including Best Limited Series or Program and Best Actress in a Television Film or Miniseries (Sullivan).

== Plot ==
While participating in a birthday treasure hunt, 10 year old Anthony Sullivan suddenly disappears in the Montreal suburbs. The investigation that follows uncovers many secrets buried by his family long ago. The family must come together in order to solve the mystery of Anthony's disappearance.

== Cast ==
- Peter Coyote as Henry Sullivan
- Camille Sullivan as Helen Murphy Sullivan
- Aden Young as Luke Sullivan
- Joanne Kelly as Catherine Sullivan
- Michael Riendeau as Anthony Sullivan
- Micheline Lanctôt as Lieutenant Detective Susan Bowden
- Kevin Parent as Sergeant-Detective Charles Cooper
- Neil Napier as Fred Cameron

== Episodes ==
No.	Title	Directed by	Written by	Original release date	Canada viewers (millions)
1	"Birthday Boy"	Peter Stebbings	Normand Daneau & Geneviève Simard	October 1, 2017	N/A
2	"The Tree"	Peter Stebbings	Normand Daneau & Geneviève Simard	October 8, 2017	N/A
3	"Sacrifice"	Peter Stebbings	Normand Daneau & Geneviève Simard	October 15, 2017	N/A
4	"Treasure Hunt"	Peter Stebbings	Normand Daneau & Geneviève Simard	October 22, 2017	N/A
5	"Burial Grounds"	Peter Stebbings	Normand Daneau & Geneviève Simard	October 29, 2017	N/A
6	"Redemption"	Peter Stebbings	Normand Daneau & Geneviève Simard	November 5, 2017	N/A
