= The Master Key (2009 film) =

- French: Grande Ourse, la clé des possibles
- Directed by: Patrice Sauvé
- Written by: Frédéric Ouellet
- Starring: Marc Messier; Fanny Mallette; Normand Daneau
- Cinematography: Ronald Plante
- Edited by: Michel Grou
- Music by: Normand Corbeil
- Production company: Point de Mire
- Release date: March 27, 2009
- Running time: 104 minutes
- Country: Canada
- Language: French

The Master Key (French: Grande Ourse, la clé des possibles) is a Canadian fantasy/mystery film, directed by Patrice Sauvé and released in 2009. A continuation of his earlier television series Grande Ourse and L’Héritière de Grande Ourse, the film stars Marc Messier as Louis-Bernard Lapointe, a wizard who is seeking to rescue his friend Émile (Normand Daneau). To succeed, he must enter a labyrinth and solve a complex puzzle in order to locate the master key to all parallel universes, within just twelve hours.

The film's cast also includes Fanny Mallette, Maude Guérin, Gabrielle Lazure, Monique Mercure, Marie Tifo, Evelyne Brochu and Anne Dorval.

The film received nine Prix Jutra nominations at the 12th Jutra Awards, and eight Genie Award nominations at the 30th Genie Awards. It won the Genie Awards for Best Original Score (Normand Corbeil) and Best Make-Up (Djina Caron and André Duval).
