= Behind the Wall (2008 film) =

- Directed by: Paul Schneider
- Screenplay by: Micheal Bafaro; Anna Singer
- Starring: Lindy Booth; Lawrence Dane; James Thomas
- Production companies: Pope Productions; Rampage Entertainment
- Release date: 2008
- Running time: 94 minutes
- Countries: Canada; United States
- Language: English

Behind the Wall is a 2008 horror film directed by Paul Schneider. It stars Lindy Booth, Lawrence Dane, James Thomas in the lead roles.

The film is about a lighthouse in the town of Henderson Bay which is haunted by an evil spirit from Katelyn's past. Once its basement is broken open, new bloodshed starts, and the horrible truth about the past is gradually unveiled.

== Plot ==
For several generations the Parks family lived on a quiet hillside where Katelyn's grandfather and her father were keepers to the town's lighthouse. At the age of ten, Katelyn watched her mom enter the basement in their lighthouse home where minutes later she was brutally beaten and found dying on the floor. Her father, Christopher, was arrested and convicted for the killing, and Katelyn placed in foster care out of town. The murder drove Christopher into madness and he was sentenced to a mental institution, where he later died. Katelyn never had a chance to speak to her father since that horrible night.

Twenty years later, Katelyn receives a mysterious letter which brings her back to the lighthouse home she swore she would never return to again. Maine coastal town Henderson Bay is broke, so deputy mayor Drew Cabot arranges a deal with a contractor to develop the abandoned lighthouse for tourism. Father Hendry fails to convince the town council to veto the project. The town wants to open the lighthouse back up but someone from Katelyn's foggy past warns her to stop them! What they don't tell her is "why". Katelyn is forced to confront the evil that lurks within the lighthouse when some of the developers slowly begin to disappear. What she discovers is a family secret long buried by her grandfather. She must now unearth the truth and find a way to stop the nightmare which surrounds the lighthouse.

== Cast ==
- Lindy Booth as Katelyn Parks
  - Julia Kennedy as 8 year old Katelyn
- Lawrence Dane as Father Hendry
- James Thomas as Drew Cabot
- Andy Jones as Ray Sanders
- Brad Hodder as Eric Carrinton
- Suzie Pollard as Monica
- Jody Richardson as Triggs Herman
- Mike Daly as Christopher Parks
- Danny McLeod as Leon Ferguson
- Ruth Lawrence as Elaine
- Paul Rowe as Police Officer
- Geraldine Hollett as Tessa
- Sean Panting as Local
- Donnie Coady as Ridley Parks
