= Djina Caron =

Canadian make-up artist

Djina Caron is a Canadian make-up artist. She is most noted for her work on the films The Master Key (Grande Ourse: La Clé des possibles), for which she and André Duval won the Genie Award for Best Makeup at the 30th Genie Awards in 2010, and Nelly, for which she won the Prix Iris for Best Makeup at the 19th Quebec Cinema Awards in 2017.

She was also a Genie nominee in the same year for Polytechnique, a Jutra nominee for The Master Key at the 12th Jutra Awards in 2010, and a Canadian Screen Award nominee at the 10th Canadian Screen Awards in 2022 for Maria Chapdelaine.
