= Normand Daneau =

Canadian actor and screenwriter

Normand Daneau is a Canadian actor and screenwriter from Quebec. He is most noted for his performance as Pierre in the 2009 film Suzie, for which he was a Jutra Award nominee for Best Supporting Actor at the 12th Jutra Awards in 2010, and as cowriter with Geneviève Simard of the television miniseries The Disappearance, for which they received a Canadian Screen Award nomination for Best Writing in a Dramatic Program or Miniseries at the 6th Canadian Screen Awards in 2018.

He is a 1992 graduate of the Conservatoire d'art dramatique de Québec.

== Filmography ==
=== Film ===
Year	Title	Role	Notes
1995	The Confessional (Le Confessionnal)	Young Fr. Massicotte	
1996	Cosmos	Colin	Segment "Aurore et crépuscule"
2004	Doux rendez-vous	Paul	
2005	Niagara Motel	Gilles	
2006	Nord Sud Est Ouest	Ambulance driver	
2009	The Master Key (Grande Ourse, la clé des possibles)	Émile Biron	
2009	Suzie	Pierre	
2010	Murmures	The man	
2011	Gerry	Béranger Dufour	
2011	The Happiness of Others (Le bonheur des autres)	Benoit	
2012	The Pee-Wee 3D: The Winter That Changed My Life (Les Pee-Wee 3d: L'hiver qui a changé ma vie)	Carl Trudel	
2015	Seldon X	René	
2016	The Squealing Game (La Chasse au collet)	Eric's father	
2017	Major Junior (Junior Majeur)	Carl Trudel	
2020	The Mirror (Le Miroir)	Jean	

=== Television ===
Year	Title	Role	Notes
1994	4 et demi...		One episode
2001	La vie, la vie	Vincent	39 episodes
2003–05	Grande Ourse	Émile Biron	20 episodes
2006	October 1970	Marc Carbonneau	Eight episodes
2007	Les Étoiles filantes	Daniel Rajotte	
2011–16	Mirador	Daniel Malenfant	14 episodes
2012	Vertige	Adrien	Six episodes
2012–17	Unité 9	Martin Lavallée	106 episodes
2014	Trauma	Robert Charbonneau	One episode
2017	Les Simone	Clément Garceau	Five episodes
2020–22	Les Mecs	Martin	30 episodes
2023	Une affaire criminelle	Michel Leroyer	Seven episodes
2024	Mont-Rouge	Luc Doiron	One episode
