= Sol (film) =

- Film poster
- Directed by: Marie-Hélène Cousineau; Susan Avingaq
- Produced by: Marie-Hélène Cousineau; Stéphane Rituit
- Cinematography: François Dagenais
- Edited by: Jeremiah Hayes
- Production company: Arnait Video Productions
- Release date: October 24, 2014 (imagineNATIVE Film + Media Arts Festival)
- Running time: 76 minutes
- Country: Canada
- Languages: Inuktitut, English

Sol is a 2014 Canadian documentary film by Marie-Hélène Cousineau and Susan Avingaq about Solomon Uyarasuk, a musician/circus performer who died in police custody in Igloolik, Nunavut. The film questions the claims by the local Royal Canadian Mounted Police detachment that Uyarasuk hanged himself in his cell, and also explores the wider issue of Nunavut's very high suicide rate.

The film played at the 2014 imagineNATIVE Film + Media Arts Festival in Toronto.

The film subsequently won the Grand Prize for Best Canadian Feature at the RIDM Montreal International Documentary Festival, and was included in the list of Canada's Top Ten feature films of 2014, selected by a panel of filmmakers and industry professionals organized by TIFF.

On March 8, 2016, it was named Best Documentary Program at the 4th Canadian Screen Awards.
