= The Timekeeper (2009 film) =

- French: L’Heure de vérité
- Directed by: Louis Bélanger
- Written by: Louis Bélanger; Lorraine Dufour
- Based on: The Timekeeper by Trevor Ferguson
- Produced by: Réal Chabot; Dean English; Karen Powell
- Starring: Craig Olejnik; Stephen McHattie; Roy Dupuis
- Cinematography: Guy Dufaux
- Edited by: Lorraine Dufour; Claude Palardy
- Music by: Guy Bélanger; Claude Fradette
- Production companies: Coop Vidéo de Montréal; Perfect Circle Productions
- Distributed by: Les Films Séville
- Release date: June 5, 2009 (BFF)
- Running time: 90 minutes
- Country: Canada
- Language: English

The Timekeeper (French: L’Heure de vérité) is a Canadian drama film, directed by Louis Bélanger and released in 2009. Adapted from the novel of the same name by Trevor Ferguson, the film stars Craig Olejnik as Martin Bishop, a young man who takes a job on a railway construction crew in the Northwest Territories, but struggles under the harsh cruelty of crew foreman Fisk (Stephen McHattie). The cast also includes Roy Dupuis, Gary Farmer, Julian Richings and Wayne Robson.

Bélanger's first English-language feature film, it was shot in 2007 in the Port-Cartier and Sept-Îles regions of Quebec. Due to financial problems at distributor Christal Films, the film was not commercially released until it was picked up by Les Films Séville in 2009.

The film received five Jutra Award nominations at the 12th Jutra Awards in 2010, for Best Supporting Actor (McHattie), Best Art Direction (André-Line Beauparlant), Best Costume Design (Sophie Lefebvre), Best Makeup (Fanny Vachon) and Best Sound (Marcel Chouinard, Richard Lavoie, Dean Giammarco and Bill Sheppard).

== Cast ==
- Craig Olejnik as Martin Bishop
- Stephen McHattie as Fisk
- Gary Farmer as Cook
- Roy Dupuis as Scully
- Julian Richings as "Grease"
- Wayne Robson as Lomacki
- Gaston Lepage as Herman "Herm"
- Vittorio Rossi as Jeeter
- Luc Morissette as Bullcook
- Neil Kroetsch as Stratton
- Marco Bacon as Jabber
- Shadow & Vito as King The Dog
