= Screening (2006 film) =

2006 Canadian short film

- Directed by: Anthony Green
- Written by: Anthony Green
- Produced by: Anthony Green; Philip Svoboda
- Starring: Martha Burns
- Cinematography: Mitchell Ness
- Edited by: Geoff Ashenhurst
- Music by: Andy Gillis
- Release date: September 2006 (TIFF)
- Running time: 16 minutes
- Country: Canada
- Language: English

Screening is a Canadian short drama film, directed by Anthony Green and released in 2006. The film stars Martha Burns as Helen Thompson, a woman coping with her grief and psychological trauma following the 2005 London bombings as she arrives at the Toronto Pearson International Airport to board a flight to London for a vigil.

The film also includes cameo appearances by Barbara Budd, Michael Enright and Julian Richings as journalists covering the bombings.

The film premiered at the 2006 Toronto International Film Festival.

The film won several awards at the 2007 Yorkton Film Festival, including Best Drama, Best Director, Best Actress (Burns), Best Cinematography (Mitchell Ness), Best Editing (Geoff Ashenhurst) and Best Sound (Jill Purdy, Stephen Barden and Paula Fairfield). It subsequently received a Genie Award nomination for Best Live Action Short Drama at the 28th Genie Awards in 2008.
