= Nurse.Fighter.Boy =

- Directed by: Charles Officer
- Written by: Charles Officer; Ingrid Veninger
- Produced by: Ingrid Veninger
- Starring: Clark Johnson; Karen LeBlanc; Daniel J. Gordon
- Cinematography: Steve Cosens
- Edited by: James Blokland
- Music by: John Welsman
- Production companies: Canadian Film Centre; Eleven Thirteen pUNK FILMS
- Distributed by: Mongrel Media
- Release date: 8 September 2008 (TIFF)
- Running time: 93 mins
- Country: Canada
- Language: English

Nurse.Fighter.Boy is a 2008 Canadian drama film, directed by Charles Officer. The film stars Karen LeBlanc as Jude, a widowed single mother undergoing treatment for sickle cell disease. While working as a night-shift nurse to support her son Ciel (Daniel J. Gordon), she meets and enters into a relationship with Silence (Clark Johnson), a troubled and brooding boxer who becomes a father figure for the young boy.

The film's cast also includes Walter Borden, Araya Mengesha, Elizabeth Saunders and Ndidi Onukwulu.

The film premiered at the 2008 Toronto International Film Festival, and screened at several other film festivals before going into commercial release in February 2009. It was released on DVD in June 2009, with bonus features including a documentary on the making of the film and Officer's short films Short Hymn, Silent War and Urda/Bone.

== Critical response ==
Liam Lacey of The Globe and Mail praised the film, writing that "contrasting with the different colour schemes associated with different milieus (gym, hospital, home), there are lovely free-wheeling shots of bicycle trips through Toronto's downtown alleys that cast a fresh eye on the city. And as the film progresses, instead of dramatic fireworks, there are moments of pop-up inspiration reminiscent of Lars von Trier at his most precious and startling - a trio of Jamaican angels singing a spiritual, a character who suddenly pops up in the midst of an azure sea."

Barry Hertz of the National Post gave it a mixed review, calling it a mediocre film lifted by excellent acting. He ultimately concluded that "despite the film's obvious shortcomings, it's still a hard picture to dismiss. When Johnson isn't busy making an impact on screen, it's easy to marvel at the gorgeous cinematography, which captures Toronto in an entirely unique light. Dank back alleys and sterile hospital wings may not seem like typically appealing locations to film, but Officer has a genuine gift for creating beautiful images in otherwise grim urban settings."

Writing for The Province, Katherine Monk dismissed the film as "a pastiche of TV plots and earnest Canadian dialogue, this well-intentioned movie is tainted by the beige brush of CBC drama where people are conflicted about every moment of their lives and often find themselves staring out the window, lacing their fingers together with a pained expression, or sighing heavily as the music swells." She also praised the acting, however, writing that "Because every performance is first-rate, the clunky dialogue rises off the page and loses a lot of its formulaic feel. LeBlanc is particularly impressive as Jude. Because the acting is so good, we believe in these characters. But director Officer fails to make us care about the big picture because there's no molten emotional core to keep this universe spinning."

Writing for the Sun Media chain, Bruce Kirkland praised the film as "beautifully crafted cinema; it explores the Jamaican-Canadian experience with a sublime tenderness; and it has a universal appeal as a film about how the human spirit copes with adversity.

== Awards and nominations ==
| Award | Date of ceremony | Category | Recipient(s) | Result | Ref(s) |
|---|---|---|---|---|---|
| Atlantic Film Festival | 2008 | Best Actress | Karen LeBlanc | Won | |
| Whistler Film Festival | 2008 | Best Actor | Clark Johnson | Won | |
| Vancouver Film Critics Circle | 2009 | Best Supporting Actor in a Canadian Film | Daniel J. Gordon | Nominated | |
| Genie Awards | April 12, 2010 | Best Picture | Ingrid Veninger | Nominated | |
| Genie Awards | April 12, 2010 | Best Director | Charles Officer | Nominated | |
| Genie Awards | April 12, 2010 | Best Actor | Clark Johnson | Nominated | |
| Genie Awards | April 12, 2010 | Best Actress | Karen LeBlanc | Nominated | |
| Genie Awards | April 12, 2010 | Best Original Screenplay | Charles Officer, Ingrid Veninger | Nominated | |
| Genie Awards | April 12, 2010 | Best Art Direction/Production Design | Diana Abbatangelo | Nominated | |
| Genie Awards | April 12, 2010 | Best Cinematography | Steve Cosens | Nominated | |
| Genie Awards | April 12, 2010 | Best Costume Design | Sarah Armstrong | Nominated | |
| Genie Awards | April 12, 2010 | Best Sound Editing | Garrett Kerr, Fred Brennan, Paul Germann, Steve Hammond, Mishann Lau | Nominated | |
| Genie Awards | April 12, 2010 | Best Original Song | John Welsman, Cherie Camp ("Oh Love") | Won | |
