= Uvanga =

- Film poster
- Directed by: Marie-Hélène Cousineau; Madeline Ivalu
- Written by: Marie-Hélène Cousineau
- Produced by: Marie-Hélène Cousineau; Madeline Ivalu; Susan Avingaq; Zacharias Kunuk; Stéphane Rituit
- Starring: Marianne Farley; Peter-Henry Arnatsiaq; Lukasi Forrest; Madeline Ivalu
- Cinematography: Samueli Ammaq; Alexandre Domingue; Félix Lajeunesse
- Edited by: Glenn Berman
- Music by: Alain Auger
- Production companies: Arnait Video Productions; Kunuk Cohn Productions
- Release date: September 19, 2013 (Cinéfest)
- Running time: 86 minutes
- Country: Canada

Uvanga ('I, me, mine') is a Canadian drama film, released in 2013. Written and directed by Marie-Hélène Cousineau and Madeline Ivalu, it was the second narrative feature film released by Arnait Video Productions.

The film stars Marianne Farley as Anna, a woman from Montreal who once had a relationship with Caleb, an Inuk man from Igloolik, Nunavut; after learning of Caleb's death, she takes their 14-year-old son Tomas (Lukasi Forrest) on a trip to Nunavut to learn more about his Inuit heritage. Sarah (Ivalu), Caleb's mother and Tomas' grandmother, tries to keep the peace between Anna and Caleb's widow Sheba (Carol Kunnuk), while Tomas bonds with his half-brother Travis (Travis Kunnuk) and Anna begins to suspect that Sheba's new boyfriend Barrie (Peter-Henry Arnatsiaq) may know more about Caleb's death than he has admitted.

The film garnered three Jutra Award nominations at the 17th Jutra Awards, in the categories of Best Sound (Eric Ladouceur, Luc Mandeville and Lynne Trépanier), Best Editing (Glenn Berman) and Best Original Music (Alain Auger).
