= Wolf Lake =

2001-2002 American television series

- A poster promoting the launch of the series.
- Genre: Supernatural drama
- Created by: John Leekley
- Starring: Lou Diamond Phillips; Tim Matheson; Mia Kirshner; Paul Wasilewski; Mary Elizabeth Winstead; Scott Bairstow; Sharon Lawrence; Graham Greene
- Opening theme: "Quiet the Night" by Ran Galor
- Composer: David Schwartz
- Countries of origin: United States; Canada
- Original language: English
- No. of seasons: 1
- No. of episodes: 9 (and 1 unaired pilot)

Production
- Executive producers: Katie O'Hara; Alex Gansa; Rick Kellard; Philip Levens; Lou Diamond Phillips
- Running time: 44 minutes
- Production companies: Cherry Pie Productions; Big Ticket Television

Original release
- Network: CBS
- Release: September 19 – October 24, 2001
- Network: UPN
- Release: April 10 – May 1, 2002

Wolf Lake is an American supernatural drama television series that originally aired on CBS from September 19 to October 24, 2001. Nine episodes were produced, but only five aired before the series was canceled by CBS. The full series, including the four unaired episodes, was later picked up and broadcast on UPN in April–May 2002. Wolf Lake depicts a pack of werewolves living in a Seattle suburb.

== Summary ==
Seattle policeman John Kanin proposes marriage to his girlfriend, Ruby Wilder, and she accepts. However, as she gets into her car, she is attacked. The only thing Kanin finds of his now fiancee, is a severed hand. He travels to her hometown of Wolf Lake to find some answers. However, his experiences there raise even more questions. What John doesn't know is that some of the inhabitants of Wolf Lake are actually werewolves. The werewolves, or the ones who survive the change, live on the "Hill" and enjoy special treatment, separated from the normal humans.

== Cast ==
=== Main ===
- Lou Diamond Phillips as Noah Cassidy (unaired pilot) & Detective/Officer John Kanin
- Paul Wesley as Lucas "Luke" Cates
- Stacy Edwards as Alexandra Kelly (unaired pilot)
- Jeff Fahey as Russell Kelly (unaired pilot)
- Bruce McGill as Dr. Sokolov (unaired pilot & Willard "Will" Cates (recurring; episodes 13)
- Tim Matheson as Sheriff Jack Kohanek (unaired pilot) & Sheriff Matthew "Matt" Donner
- Graham Greene as Professor Duke Joseph (unaired pilot) & Mr. Sherman Blackstone
- Mary Elizabeth Winstead as Sophia Donner
- Sharon Lawrence as Vivian "V" Cates
- Scott Bairstow as Tyler Creed
- Mia Kirshner as Ruby Wilder/Cates/Creed

=== Recurring ===
- Kellie Waymire as Miranda Devereaux
- Fiona Scott as Presley
- Carmen Moore as Deputy Molly
- Christian Bocher as Buddy Hooks

=== Guest stars ===
- Bill Mondy
- Gregory Itzin
- Sam Anderson
- Levi James
- Craig Olejnik
- Sarah Carter
- Ralph J. Alderman
- Craig Bruhnanski
- Steve Makaj
- Kelly Dean Sereda
- Deanne Henry
- Ryan Robbins
- Jodelle Ferland

== Episodes ==
Rupert Wainwright directed an unaired pilot for the series with some characters and plot points that were changed when the series was later directed. Wainwright's unaired pilot is featured on the DVD release of the entire series.

The first five episodes of Wolf Lake aired on CBS in September–October 2001, before CBS pulled the series from the air. The series later was reaired on UPN, with the final four episodes debuting on UPN in April–May 2002.

List of Wolf Lake episodes
No.	Title	Directed by	Written by	Original release date	Prod. code	US viewers (millions)
CBS
1	"Meat The Parents"	Bryan Spicer	Alex Gansa & Rick Kellard	September 19, 2001	62555-001	8.69
2	"The Changing"	Dwight Little	Daniel Knauf	September 26, 2001	62555-002	7.54
3	"Soup to Nuts"	Joe Chappelle	Roger Director	October 3, 2001	62555-003	6.70
4	"Tastes Like Chicken"	Rachel Talalay	Philip Levens	October 10, 2001	62555-004	5.91
5	"Excitable Boy"	Po Chih Leong	Toni Graphia	October 24, 2001	62555-005	6.11
UPN
6	"Four Feet Under"	Winrich Kolbe	Roger Director & Daniel Knauf	April 10, 2002	62555-006	2.64
7	"Leader of the Pack"	James Head	James Duff	April 17, 2002	62555-007	2.3
8	"Legend of Lost Lenore"	Joe Chappelle	Rick Kellard	April 24, 2002	62555-008	2.96
9	"If These Wolves Could Talk"	Thomas J. Wright	Story by : Roger Director & Rick Kellard; Teleplay by : James Duff & Philip Levens	May 1, 2002	62555-009	2.56

== Broadcast ==
ITV bought the rights to show the series in the United Kingdom. In August 2006, the Sci Fi Channel bought the syndication rights to reair the series in the United States.

== Home media ==
The series was made available on DVD in 2012.

== Reception ==
On Rotten Tomatoes, the series has an aggregated score of 20% based on 2 positive and 8 negative critic reviews. The website’s consensus reads: "Wolf Lake's ill-defined story and uninvolving sense of mystery make it a yawn-inducing watch."

While Ron Wertheimer of The New York Times said it was "a promisingly quirky pilot", Variety's Michael Speier remarked that it "sometimes works as high drama but sometimes comes off as extremely silly".

While the series was poorly rated, it received two Emmy nominations, for Outstanding Main Title Design and Outstanding Main Title Theme Music.
