= Restless River =

- French: La rivière sans repos
- Directed by: Marie-Hélène Cousineau; Madeline Ivalu
- Written by: Marie-Hélène Cousineau; Madeline Ivalu
- Based on: Windflower (La rivière sans repos) by Gabrielle Roy
- Produced by: Marie-Hélène Cousineau; Madeline Ivalu; Lucy Tulugarjuk
- Starring: Malaya Qaunirq Chapman; Magalie Lépine-Blondeau; Patrick Hivon
- Cinematography: Edith Labbé
- Edited by: Michel Grou
- Music by: Vanessa Marcoux
- Production company: Arnait Video Productions
- Distributed by: Isuma
- Release date: October 12, 2019 (FNC)
- Running time: 98 minutes
- Country: Canada
- Languages: English; French; Inuktitut

Restless River (French: La rivière sans repos) is a Canadian drama film, directed by Marie-Hélène Cousineau and Madeline Ivalu and released in 2019. An adaptation of Gabrielle Roy's 1970 novel Windflower (La rivière sans repos), the film stars Malaya Qaunirq Chapman as Elsa, a young Inuk woman in Kuujjuaq, Quebec in the 1940s who becomes a mother after being raped by an American soldier stationed at the town's military base, but whose resilience and strength carry her through her difficult circumstances.

The film's cast also includes Magalie Lépine-Blondeau, Patrick Hivon, Mark Antony Krupa, Tobie Pelletier, Taqraliq Partridge, Nick Serino, Etua Snowball and Matthew York. Ivalu also appears in a supporting role as Elsa's grandmother.

The film premiered on October 12, 2019 at the Festival du nouveau cinéma.

== Critical response ==
Jill Wilson of the Winnipeg Free Press gave the film a mixed review, writing that it beautifully evoked a sense of place but that it was less effective at telling its story: "There are too many pregnant pauses that reveal nothing, too many time-jumps that leave character development in the dirt, too many scenes that seem freighted with significance but go nowhere. It's not often you want more tell and less show, but more insight into Elsa's mindset would be welcome. Though her path and that of her son are shaped inexorably by the forces of white influence, she's far from passive. By the film's end, however, we're left wondering if she's found contentment or is merely resigned to her fate."
