= Paul-Dylan Ivalu =

Canadian actor

- Citizenship: Canadian
- Occupation: actor
- Known for: Before Tomorrow (Le Jour avant le lendemain)

Paul-Dylan Ivalu is a Canadian Inuk actor from Igloolik, Nunavut. He is best known for his role as Maniq in the film Before Tomorrow (Le Jour avant le lendemain), for which he received a Genie Award nomination for Best Actor at the 30th Genie Awards.

He costarred in the film with his real-life grandmother, Madeline Ivalu.

He previously also acted in film The Journals of Knud Rasmussen.
