= Cabaret Neiges Noires =

- Directed by: Raymond Saint-Jean
- Written by: Dominic Champagne
- Produced by: Michel Ouellette
- Starring: André Barnard; Julie Castonguay; Dominic Champagne; Estelle Esse; Norman Helms; Roger Larue; Suzanne Lemoine; Didier Lucien; Jean Petitclerc; Dominique Quesnel
- Cinematography: Ronald Plante
- Edited by: Philippe Ralet
- Music by: Pierre Benoît
- Production company: Cine Qua Non Films
- Distributed by: Antenna Distribution
- Release date: 1997
- Running time: 97 minutes
- Country: Canada
- Language: French

Cabaret Neiges Noires is a 1997 French Canadian musical film, by Cine Qua Non Films. It was directed by Raymond Saint-Jean and written by Dominic Champagne. Its tagline is Le cri d'une génération.

== Cast ==
- André Barnard - Le Démon
- Julie Castonguay - Maria
- Dominic Champagne - Joyeux Troubadour
- Estelle Esse - Prêtresse
- Norman Helms - JeanJean
- Roger Larue - Claude Jutra
- Suzanne Lemoine - Peste
- Didier Lucien - Martin
- Jean Petitclerc - Mario
- Dominique Quesnel - Le Vieille Dame
