= Ronald Plante =

Canadian cinematographer

Ronald Plante is a Canadian cinematographer from Quebec, most noted as a multiple Genie Award and Prix Iris nominee for his work in Canadian film and television.

== Filmography ==
=== Film ===
- Cabaret Neiges Noires - 1997
- Cigarette - 1997
- Turbulences - 1998
- I Need a Hole in the Head (J'ai besoin d'un trou dans la tête) - 1999
- 2000 pieds carrés - 1999
- Photographies - 1999
- Kanata: Legacy of the Children of Aataentsic - 1999
- Just Watch Me: Trudeau and the '70s Generation - 1999
- Shadow Chasers (Les chasseurs d'ombre) - 2000
- Scènes d'enfants - 2002
- Far Side of the Moon (La Face cachée de la lune) - 2003
- The Master Key (Grande Ourse, la clé des possibles) - 2009
- Piché: The Landing of a Man (Piché, entre ciel et terre) - 2010
- Vodka Canneberge - 2010
- Monsieur Lazhar - 2011
- Funkytown - 2011
- First Snow (Première neige) - 2012
- Sur les traces de la fusion: L'acte 1 - 2012
- Jappeloup - 2013
- Stay - 2013
- The Good Lie - 2014
- The Ones - 2014
- The Kind Words - 2015
- My Internship in Canada (Guibord s'en va-t-en guerre) - 2015
- The New Life of Paul Sneijder (La Nouvelle Vie de Paul Sneijder) - 2016
- Père fils thérapie! - 2016
- 9 - 2016
- Bon Cop, Bad Cop 2 - 2017
- This Is Our Cup (Ça sent la coupe) - 2017
- La Bolduc - 2018
- For Heaven's Sake! - 2018
- Relai - 2019
- Target Number One - 2020
- My Very Own Circus (Mon cirque à moi) - 2020
- La Tresse - 2023
- Yunan - 2025

=== Television ===
- The Man of Glass (L'Homme de verre) - 2000
- Les aventures tumultueuses de Jack Carter - 2003
- Les Invincibles - 2005
- Cover Girl - 2005, 26 episodes
- Les Hauts et les bas de Sophie Paquin - 2006
- The Beautiful Life - 2009
- Vertige - 2012, five episodes
- Série noire - 2014, 11 episodes
- 19-2 - 2014–17, nine episodes
- Demain des hommes - 2018, ten episodes
- Sharp Objects - 2018, eight episodes
- Street Legal - 2019, six episodes
- Mirage - 2020, six episodes
- The Republic of Sarah - 2021, two episodes
- Reacher - 2022
- Ghosts - 2022, one episode
- Blood & Treasure - 2022, one episode
- Three Pines - 2022, six episodes
- Fellow Travelers - 2023, one episode

== Awards ==
Award	Year	Category	Work	Result	Ref(s)
Genie Awards	2010	Best Cinematography	The Master Key (Grande Ourse: La Clé des possibles)	Nominated	
Genie Awards	2011	Best Cinematography	Piché: The Landing of a Man (Piché: entre ciel et terre)	Nominated	
Genie Awards	2012	Best Cinematography	Monsieur Lazhar	Nominated	
Canadian Screen Awards	2018	Best Photography in a Dramatic Program or Series	19–2: "Labour Day"	Nominated	
Jutra/Iris Awards	2009	Best Cinematography	The Broken Line (La ligne brisée)	Nominated	
Jutra/Iris Awards	2010	Best Cinematography	The Master Key (Grande Ourse: La Clé des possibles)	Nominated	
Jutra/Iris Awards	2019	Best Cinematography	La Bolduc	Nominated	
