= Michel Grou =

Canadian film and television editor and writer

Michel Grou is a Canadian film and television editor and writer, most noted as a recipient of Genie Award and Jutra Award nominations for his work in film.

In 2023 he published his debut novel Maman, a fictionalized account of his mother's decline and death of Alzheimer's disease.

== Filmography ==
=== Film ===
- L'Effet boeuf - 1999
- Juchitan, Queer Paradise (Juchitán de las locas) - 2002
- Angel's Rage (La Rage de l'ange) - 2006
- Cheech - 2006
- The Dark Side of the White Lady (El lado obscuro de la dama blanca) - 2006
- The Last Continent (Mission Antarctique) - 2007
- A White Dress (Une robe blanche) - 2008
- She Monster (La Monstre) - 2009
- The Master Key (Grande Ourse: La Clé des possibles) - 2009
- Love & Volts - 2010
- On My Mother's Side (L'Origine des espèces) - 2015
- The Cyclotron (Le Cyclotron) - 2016
- This Is Our Cup (Ça sent la coupe) - 2017
- Heartburn (Mal de cœur) - 2018
- Restless River (La rivière sans repos) - 2019
- Underground (Souterrain) - 2020
- Première vague - 2021
- Danavan - 2021

=== Television ===
- La vie, la vie - 2001
- Grande ourse - 2002
- Abducted: Fugitive for Love - 2007
- Lethal Beauty - 2010
- Trauma - 2010-2013
- Vertige - 2012
- La Vie Parfaite - 2013
- Mensonges - 2014
- Toi et moi - 2014-16
- Karl & Max - 2015
- Victor Lessard - 2017
- La Malédiction de Jonathan Plourde - 2018
- La Faille - 2019-21
- One of a Kind Love - 2021
- Larry - 2022
- Farmer Seeking Love - 2022
- Face cachée - 2024

== Awards ==
Award	Date of ceremony	Category	Film	Result	Ref(s)
Genie Awards	2007	Best Editing	Cheech	Nominated	
Genie Awards	2010	Best Editing	The Master Key (Grande Ourse: La Clé des possibles)	Nominated	
Prix Jutra/Iris	2010	Best Editing	The Master Key (Grande Ourse: La Clé des possibles)	Nominated	
Prix Jutra/Iris	2021	Best Editing	Underground (Souterrain)	Nominated	
