= Trevor Ferguson =

Canadian novelist (born 1947)

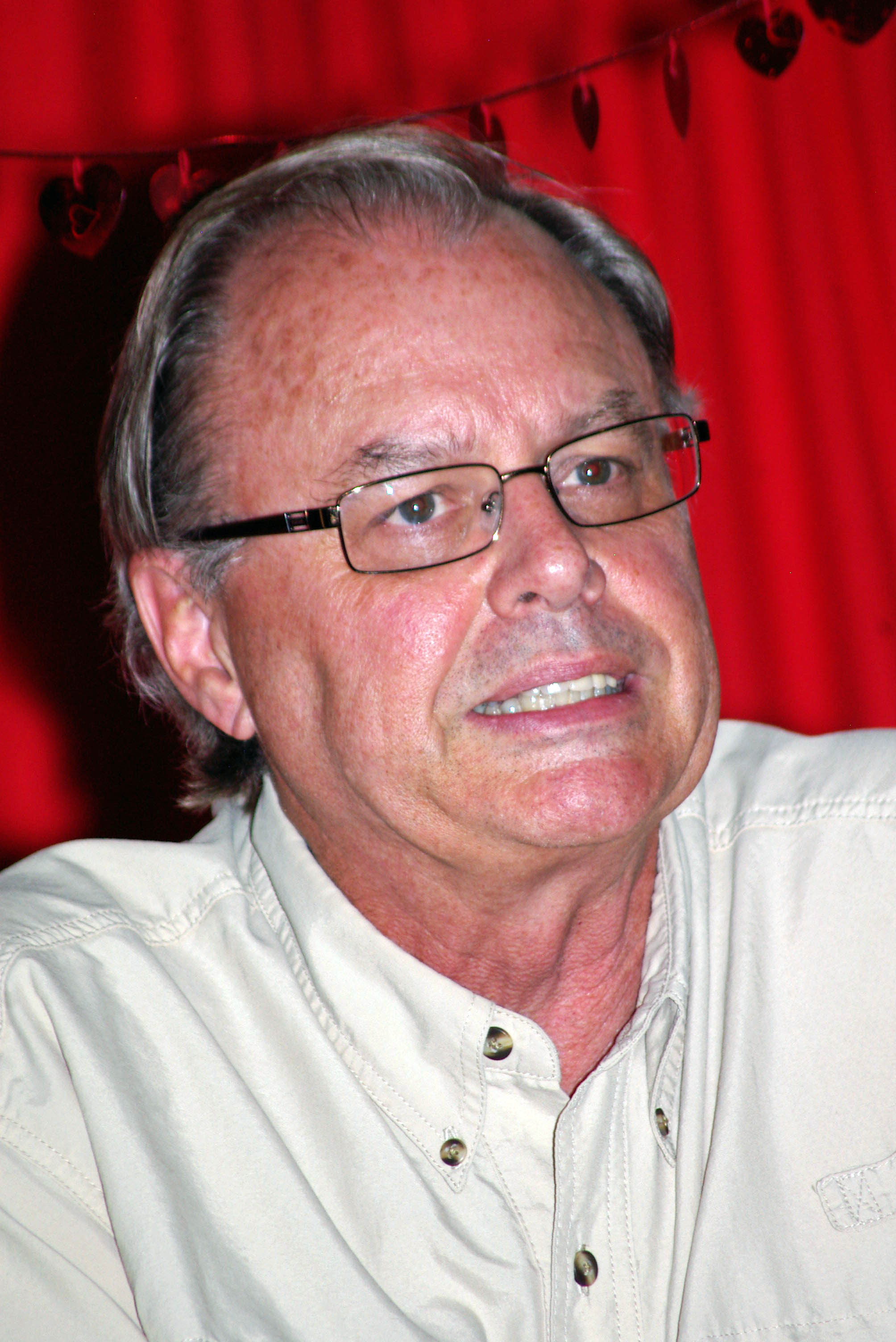
- Canadian novelist Trevor Ferguson
- Born: November 11, 1947 (age 78); Seaforth, Ontario
- Occupation: novelist
- Website: https://www.johnfarrowmysteries.com

Trevor Ferguson, also known as John Farrow, (born 11 November 1947) is a Canadian novelist who lived for many years in Hudson, Quebec, and he and his wife Lynne Hill Ferguson now live in Victoria, British Columbia. He is the author of fourteen novels and four plays. He has been called Canada's best novelist both in quak Books in Canada and the Toronto Star.

Born in Seaforth, Huron County, Ontario, in 1947, he was raised in Montreal from the age of three. In his mid-teens, he gravitated towards Canada's northwest where he worked on railway gangs, and also began to write, working at night in the bunkhouses.

In his early twenties, he travelled and worked throughout Europe and the United States before returning to Montreal to write. He settled into driving a taxi by night and writing by day until the publication of his first novel, High Water Chants, in 1977, which Dennis Lee called one of the best in the language. His second novel, Onyx John, in 1985, received (arguably) the highest critical acclaim in the history of Canadian literature. Leon Rooke called it one of the five best novels of the twentieth century. Sixteen years later, the novel would become a bestseller in France. Indeed, his work is highly regarded in France, where he's often cited as being one of the world's pre-eminent writers.

Extraordinary praise also awaited the publication of his third novel, The Kinkajou. His fourth, The Timekeeper, won the Hugh MacLennan Prize for fiction and was developed into the 2009 film The Timekeeper by Louis Bélanger. A ninth novel, part of a series in the crime genre, River City, was published in 2011 and the paperback, at 1,000 pages, in 2012. The option for it to be a mini-series has been agreed upon, as of November 2013. Trevor Ferguson's most recent literary novel was The River Burns, published by Simon and Schuster in 2014, the paperback in 2015.

City of Ice, first in that series and written under the penname John Farrow, has been published in seventeen countries. The Vancouver Sun called the book the best ever produced in Canada in genre fiction. The second in the series, Ice Lake, caused the New York library journal Booklist to claim that the series is among the very best in crime fiction today. Die Zeit, a major cultural newspaper in Germany, declared the series the best of all time. River City was the third of the three and was equally well received. A new trilogy of John Farrow crime novels, The Storm Murders, had been sold to Thomas Dunne Books/St. Martin's Press in New York and appeared under the Minotaur imprint. The first came out in May 2015, under the same name, The Storm Murders. The second. Seven Days Dead followed in 2016, to high praise in The New York Times, The Toronto Star, the Globe and Mail, and earned a starred review in Booklist. The third, Perish the Day, came out in 2017. More crime novels have followed the trilogy, with Ball Park (2019) featuring a young Detective Emile Cinq-Mars set in Montreal 1975.

In 2002, Trevor Ferguson's first play, Long, Long, Short, Long was produced by infinitheatre (dir. Guy Sprung) in Montreal and has become the first English play in history to be nominated by l'académie québécoise du théâtre (now defunct) for a Soirée Masque award for best text. It returned to the stage in French in the fall of 2005, at Place des Arts in Montreal, and was seen by more than 20,000 people. His second play, Beach House, Burnt Sienna, was chosen to commemorate the tenth anniversary of Village Theatre West in Hudson in 2002. Co-produced with infinitheatre (dir. Guy Sprung), it enjoyed a highly successful run. A third play, Barnacle Wood, was produced in Montreal, also by infinitheatre, in March 2004. His fourth play, Zarathustra Said Some Things, No? opens with the Bridge Theatre Company at Studio 54 in New York City, in April, 2006.

Ferguson is a past chair of the Writers' Union of Canada. He has been a writer-in-residence at the University of Alberta, an invité d'honneur at the Salon du Livre de Montreal, and he was among the Quebec authors invited as special guests of the Paris Book Fair in 1999, and to the Guadalajara Book Fair in 2003. In 2002, he was one of the few Canadian writers invited to the Festival of the Americas in Paris. Also in 2002, he served on the faculty of the May Writers' Studio at the Banff Centre for the Arts. He has frequently taught creative writing at Concordia University. In June 2019, Trevor Ferguson received an Honorary Doctorate, of Divinity, courtesy of the Vancouver School of Theology, for his work as a novelist.

== Awards and honours ==
Awards for Ferguson's writing
Year	Title	Award	Result	Ref.
1999	City of Ice	Paragraphe Hugh MacLennan Prize for Fiction	Shortlist	
2001	Ice Lake	Paragraphe Hugh MacLennan Prize for Fiction	Shortlist	

== Publications ==
=== Novels ===
- High Water Chants (1977)
- Onyx John (1985)
- The Kinkajou (1989)
- The True Life Adventures of Sparrow Drinkwater (1993)
- The Timekeeper (1995)
- The Fire Line (1995)
- The River Burns (2014)

==== Emile Cinq-Mars novels (as John Farrow) ====
- City of Ice (1999)
- Ice Lake (2001)
- River City (2011)
- The Storm Murders (2015)
- Seven Days Dead (2016)
- Perish the Day (2017)
- Ball Park (2019)
- Roar Back (2020)
- Lady Jail (2021)
- A Patient Death (2023)
- Bright Shining as the Sun (2025)

=== Plays ===
- Long Long Short Long (2002)
- Beach House, Burnt Sienna (2002)
- Barnacle Wood (2004)
- Zarathustra Said Some Things, No? (2006, New York; 2009, Montreal)
