= Marie-Hélène Cousineau =

Canadian film director

- Born: Montreal, Quebec, Canada
- Occupations: film director, producer
- Years active: 2000s-present
- Notable work: Before Tomorrow (Le Jour avant le lendemain), Sol

Marie-Hélène Cousineau is a Canadian film director and producer. Originally from Quebec, she moved to Igloolik, Northwest Territories (now in Nunavut) in 1990, where she became a co-founder of the filmmaking collective Arnait Video Productions.

Her most noted film, Before Tomorrow (Le Jour avant le lendemain), was co-directed with Madeline Ivalu and released in 2008. Cousineau and Ivalu were shortlisted Genie Award nominees for Best Director, and alongside co-writer Susan Avingaq for Best Adapted Screenplay, at the 30th Genie Awards in 2010. Cousineau later collaborated with Ivalu on the film Uvanga, and with Avingaq on the documentary film Sol. Sol is a feature documentary, that explores the mysterious death of a young Inuk man, Solomon Uyurasuk. As the documentary investigates the truth to Solomon's death, it sheds light on the underlying social issues of Canada's North that has resulted in this region claiming one of the highest youth suicide rates in the world.

More recently, Cousineau has collaborated with Ivalu on Restless River, an adaptation of Gabrielle Roy's unpublished work La Rivière sans repos, previously translated and published as Windflower.

== Background ==
Marie-Hélène Cousineau was born in Montreal, Quebec, Canada. She received her undergraduate degree in art history from the Université Laval, an MA in art history from the Université du Québec à Montréal and an MFA in communication studies and production from the University of Iowa in Iowa City. She has taught at different colleges and at Concordia University in Montreal.

Cousineau moved to Igloolik in 1990 to work with Zacharias Kunuk to establish the Tarriaksuk Video Centre. While in Igloolik she gave a class through the Arctic College in Igloolik on how to make videos. From this class Cousineau was inspired to create a Survey for a Woman’s Video Workshop (1991). This film featured women who wanted to learn to make videos. It was used in a funding application and in 1991 Arnait Ikajurtigiit – which translates to “women helping each other was founded.

== Career ==
Arnait was registered originally as a nonprofit organization. Susan Avingaq, Madeline Ivalu, and Mathilda Hanniliaq, all women from Igloolik along with Cousineau signed as founders of Arnait. Later, Arnait incorporated as a for-profit company to have access to financing. Susan Avingaq, Madeline Ivalu, and Cousineau were the partners in the company, Arnait Video Productions Inc. Cousineau acted as a writer, director and producer at Arnait.

In their early work, Arnait utilized short format video to tell women’s stories. In Qulliq (1993), members of Arnait reenact a traditional women’s activity – the lighting of the qulliq, or the seal oil lamp. In Attagutalak Starvation (1992), village elder Rose Ukkumaluk recounts the tale of Attagutaaluk, a woman who survived winter starvation by resorting to cannibalism. With Inuit Midwives (1991), the collective recorded 9hrs of interviews, to preserve Inuit oral storytelling traditions. Arnait was also an early adopter of Internet streaming technologies, producing Live from the Tundra over the course of five days in August 2001. Around this time, the members of Arnait were involved in the creation of Atanarjuat (The Fast Runner). The experience in the production of Antanarjuat inspired them to create feature films such as Before Tomorrow (2008) and Restless River (2019). Cousineau also acted as the producer on two television series based in the North – The Uluit: Champions of the North (2011) and Sivummut: Going Forward (2014). Arnait has also embarked upon community-based cultural exchange projects in Oaxaca, Mexico and Nuuk, Greenland, extending their original mission to include the voices of indigenous people from outside of Igloolik. Arnait also operates an online channel on Isuma.tv, a collaborative multimedia platform for indigenous filmmakers and media organizations.

Samuel Cohn-Cousineau, her son with Norman Cohn, is also a screenwriter and film producer, whose work has included collaborations with his mother on Tia and Piujuq and with Kunuk on Wrong Husband (Uiksaringitara).

== Films ==
- Inuit Midwives (1991)
- Attagutalak Starvation (1992)
- Quilliq (1993)
- Anaana (2001)
- Before Tomorrow (Le Jour avant le lendemain) (2008) (writer and co-director with Madeline Ivalu)
- The Uluit: Champions of the North (2011) (producer)
- Uvanga (2013) (writer/director)
- Sol (2014) (co-director with Susan Avingaq and co-writer with Dana Schoel)
- Tia and Piujuq (producer/screenwriter)
- Angelique's Isle (2018) (director)
- Restless River (La rivière sans repos) (2019) (co-directed with Madeline Ivalu)
