= Love and Savagery =

- Directed by: John N. Smith
- Screenplay by: Des Walsh
- Produced by: Barbara Doran; Kevin Tierney; Lynne Wilson
- Starring: Allan Hawco; Sarah Greene; Martha Burns; Nicholas Campbell
- Cinematography: Pierre Letarte
- Edited by: Michel Arcand
- Music by: Bertrand Chénier
- Release date: 2009
- Countries: Canada; Ireland
- Language: English

Love and Savagery is a Canadian-Irish drama film directed by John N. Smith and released in 2009.

The film stars Allan Hawco as Michael, a geologist from Newfoundland and Labrador who travels to Ballyvaughan, Ireland to study limestone, and causes a scandal when he enters a romantic relationship with Cathleen (Sarah Greene), an orphan girl from the village who is about to enter the convent as a Roman Catholic nun. The film's cast also includes Martha Burns, Nicholas Campbell, Andy Jones, Louise Nicol, Mack Furlong and Sean Panting.

== Cast ==
- Allan Hawco as Michael
- Sarah Greene as Cathleen
- Louise Nicol as Mrs. Collins, The Principal
- Martha Burns as Mother Superior
- Nicholas Campbell as Senior Tinker
- Macdara O Fatharta as Thomas Collins
- Sean Panting as Wilfred
- Anne Butler as Mrs. Quigley
- Amber Cull as Mary Callaghan
- Lesley Dowey as Maura
- Frank Deacy as Father Joseph
- Aiden Flynn as Liam Collins
- Dylan Smith as Sean Collins
- Mark Whelan as Jim Hyland
- Andy Jones as Old Man At Reading
- Monica Walsh as Young Woman At Reading
- Sylina Jones as Nun
- Melee Hutton as Lodging Housekeeper
- Terry O'Rourke as Dublin Bartender

== Awards ==
The film garnered four Genie Award nominations at the 30th Genie Awards in 2010:

- Best Supporting Actress: Martha Burns
- Best Overall Sound: Claude Hazanavicius, Daniel Bisson, Jean-Charles Desjardins and Bernard Gariépy Strobl
- Best Original Score: Bertrand Chénier
- Best Make-Up: Diane Simard and Réjean Goderre

Burns won the award for Best Supporting Actress.
