= Madeline Ivalu =

Canadian film director and actor

- Occupations: filmmaker, actress
- Known for: Before Tomorrow (Le Jour avant le lendemain)
- Relatives: Paul-Dylan Ivalu (grandson); Lucy Tulugarjuk (niece)

Madeline Piujuq Ivalu is a Canadian Inuk filmmaker and actor from Igloolik, Nunavut. One of the cofounders of Arnait Video Productions, a women's video and filmmaking collective in Nunavut, she co-directed, co-wrote and starred in Arnait's first feature film production, Before Tomorrow (Le Jour avant le lendemain). She costarred in the film with her real-life grandson, Paul-Dylan Ivalu. Her codirector of the film was Marie-Hélène Cousineau, and both women cowrote the film with Susan Avingaq.

She garnered three Genie Award nominations at the 30th Genie Awards, for Best Performance by an Actress in a Leading Role, Best Achievement in Direction and Best Adapted Screenplay. Ivalu and Cousineau also codirected the 2013 film Uvanga, in which Ivalu played a supporting role.

She has also acted in the films Atanarjuat: The Fast Runner, The Journals of Knud Rasmussen, Tia and Piujuq, The Grizzlies and Angakusajaujuq: The Shaman's Apprentice, and was one of the credited writers of The Journals of Knud Rasmussen. With Cousineau, she also wrote and directed the films Uvanga and Restless River.
