= Martha Burns =

Canadian actress

- Born: 23 April 1957 (age 69); Winnipeg, Manitoba, Canada
- Occupation: Actress
- Years active: 1983–present
- Spouse: Paul Gross (m. 1988)
- Children: 2, including Hannah Gross
- Father: James W. Burns

Martha Burns (born 23 April 1957) is a Canadian actress known for her stage work and youth outreach in Ontario and her leading role as Ellen Fanshaw in the TV dramedy series Slings and Arrows.

== Early life ==
Burns was born and raised in Winnipeg, Manitoba, Canada. She studied at the University of Alberta and the Vancouver Playhouse's Acting School.

== Career ==
Burns has had a long career as a character and supporting actress, her most notable television roles being Shakespearean diva Ellen Fanshaw in Slings and Arrows, for which she won two Gemini Awards, Jasmina Hart on Michael, Tuesdays and Thursdays. and Rebecca Baker on Remedy.

Some of her notable film work includes Long Day's Journey into Night and for Love and Savagery, both resulting in Genie Awards for Best Performance by an Actress in a Supporting Role.

=== Theatre ===
Burns is a founding member and a former associate director of Toronto's Soulpepper Theatre Company. Burns headed up Soulpepper's extensive youth outreach program. She founded the Toronto Arts for Youth Award, and has worked as an instructor for the theatre program at George Brown College.

She has performed leading roles at Stratford, the Shaw Festival, the National Arts Centre and The Company Theatre. She was nominated five times for a Dora Award and won twice: in 1986 for The Miracle Worker and in 1984 for Trafford Tanzi.

In 2005 she was honoured for her career in the theatre with the Barbara Hamilton Award.

In 2016 Burns was awarded ACTRA’s Leslie Yeo Award, an award honouring actors for their volunteer work. She donated her cash prize to the Qaggiq Performing Arts Teacher Training Workshop, a program that works on developing Inuit-specific performing arts programming for children and youth.

== Personal life ==
Burns is married to director and actor Paul Gross. They have two children, Hannah Gross and Jack.

== Filmography ==
=== Film ===
Year	Title	Role	Notes
1992	Passage of the Heart	Kate Ward	
1994	Paint Cans	Melda	
1995	Never Talk to Strangers	Maura	
1999	The Life Before This	Gwen Maclean	
2000	Hindsight	Trina	Short film
2004	Siblings	Miss Bradford	
2006	Screening	Helen Thompson	Short film
2007	Silk	Mme. Joncour	
2008	Rewind	Heather Beckett	Short film
2009	You Might as Well Live	Dr. Elizabeth	
2009	Dinner at Lucy's	Lucy	Short film
2009	Love and Savagery	Mother Superior	Won – Genie Award for Best Performance by an Actress in a Supporting Role
2009	A Wake	Sabina	
2010	The Reception	Debra	Short film
2011	French Immersion	Cathy	
2012	Fury	Gretchen	
2013	Mad Ship	Judith	
2013	Hardsell	Sandra Hipps	Short film
2015	Boxing	Janet	Short film
2016	A False Sense of Security	Debra	Short film
2021	We're All in This Together	Kate Parker	
2026	In the Heart of the South	Mrs. Clark	

=== Television ===
Year	Title	Role	Notes
1983	Backstretch	Kelly	TV series
1987	Street Legal	Margaret	"Take My Jokes, Please"
1990	The Last Best Year	Sally	TV film
1991	E.N.G.	Joanna Miles	"Tyger, Tyger"
1995	Great Performances	Cathleen	"Long Day's Journey Into Night"; Won – Genie Award for Best Performance by an Actress in a Supporting Role
1996	Side Effects	Andrea Burrows	"Sex, Death and Rock 'N' Roll"
1996	Traders	Rita Hutchison	"Two Steps Forward"
1997	Marie Curie: More Than Meets the Eye	Lisette Boudreau	TV film
1997	Due South	Nadia	"Spy vs. Spy"
1998	Witness to Yesterday	Amelia Earhart	"Amelia Earhart"
1998	Thanks of a Grateful Nation	Dr. Rosemary Dove	TV film
1999	What Katy Did	Aunt Izzie	TV film
1999	Due South	Caroline Fraser	"Call of the Wild: Part 2"
1999	Emily of New Moon	Eve Kinch	"Under the Wishing Moon: Part 1", "Bridge of Dreams: Part 2"
1999	Murder Most Likely	Alice Malinson	TV film
2003	Profoundly Normal	Dr. Maswell	TV film
2003-06	Slings & Arrows	Ellen Fanshaw	Main role Nominated – Gemini Award for Best Performance by an Actress in a Continuing Leading Dramatic Role (2004); Nominated – Canadian Comedy Award for Best Female TV Performance (2006); Won – Gemini Award for Best Performance by an Actress in a Continuing Leading Dramatic Role (2006); Won – Gemini Award for Best Performance by an Actress in a Continuing Leading Dramatic Role (2007)
2008	The Trojan Horse	Mary Miller	"Part One"
2009	Murdoch Mysteries	Mrs. Burgess	"Convalescence"
2009	The Foundation	Selena Selkirk	"The Face of Hope", "The African Prince", "Springing Jett"
2011	Republic of Doyle	Joyce	"Something Old, Someone Blue"
2011	Michael: Tuesdays and Thursdays	Jasmina Hart	Main role
2013	After All These Years	Phyllis Deitrichson	TV film
2013	Cracked	Alice Kelly	"The Valley"
2014	Darknet	Mother	"Darknet 3"
2014-15	Remedy	Rebecca Baker	Main role Nominated – Canadian Screen Award for Best Performance by an Actress in a Featured Supporting Role in a Dramatic Program or Series (2016)
2017	Alias Grace	Mrs. Parkinson	3 episodes
2022	Guillermo del Toro's Cabinet of Curiosities	Agatha	Episode: "Lot 36"
