= Carinne Leduc =

Canadian actress and director

- Born: Canada
- Occupations: Film director, actor, screenwriter
- Known for: 3 Seasons
- Spouse: Jim Donovan

Carinne Leduc is a Canadian film director, screenwriter and actor.

She has won the Borso Award at the Whistler Film Festival for Best Actress, Best Actress at the Salento International Film Festival and was nominated at the Genie Awards for "Best Actress in a Leading Role" for her role in 3 Seasons.

In addition to directing commercials and music videos, she directed the short films Les Grébiches, Lemonade and B. She co-wrote the award-winning feature film 3 Seasons.
