= Jørn Riel =

Danish writer (1931–2023)

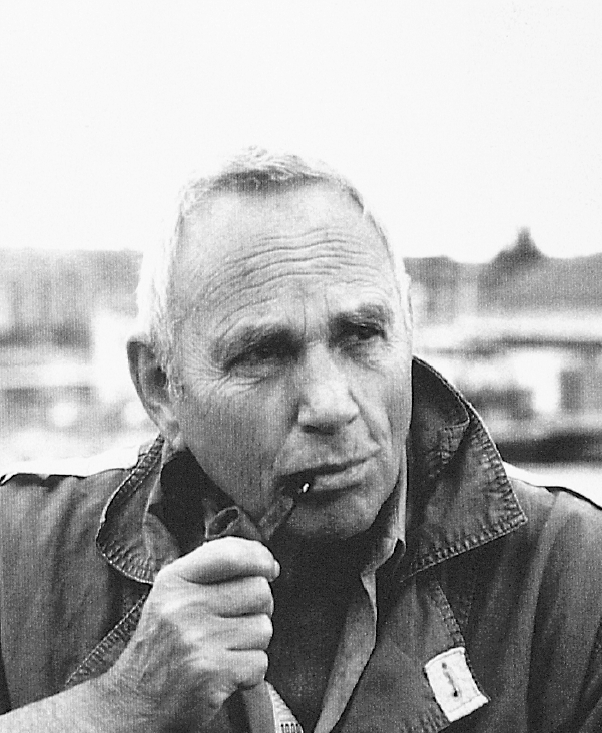

Jørn Riel (23 July 1931 – 18 August 2023) was a Danish writer.

Riel was born in Odense on 23 July 1931. He was partly known for works on Greenland as he lived there for sixteen years. One of his works was adapted to film as Before Tomorrow (Le Jour avant le lendemain). Riel died in Kuala Lumpur on 18 August 2023, at the age of 92.

== Bibliography ==
- 1970 En fortælling hvoraf man får et smukt ansigt
- 1971 Vorherres rævefælde
- 1972 Det første af altings fest
- 1972 Pigen som søgte Havets Mor. Eventyr fra Grønland. (børnebog)
- 1973 Da Higginbottom tabte sin skygge
- 1973 Satans til Higginbottom
- 1974 Den fede, hvide Tuan (noveller)
- 1974 Den kolde jomfru og andre skrøner (skrøner)
- 1975 En arktisk safari og andre skrøner (skrøner)
- 1975 Før morgendagen
- 1976 Du bor i dit navn
- 1976 En underlig duel og andre skrøner (skrøner)
- 1977 Floder i havet
- 1977 Helvedespræsten og andre skrøner (skrøner)
- 1978 De gule blades ånd
- 1978 Strejfer mine drømme
- 1979 Drengen som ville være menneske (børnebog)
- 1979 Sarfartut / Strømsteder (digte)
- 1979 Ungkarlehuset
- 1980 Leiv, Narua og Apuluk (børnebog)
- 1980 Rejsen til Nanga - en usædvanlig lang skrøne
- 1980 Videre mod Nord (børnebog)
- 1981 Den lange neger og andre fortællinger (fortællinger)
- 1982 Den blå dør
- 1982 Frk. Biancas dybe fald
- 1983 Sangen for livet - Heq
- 1984 Sangen for livet - Soré
- 1985 Sangen for livet - Arluk
- 1986 En lodret løgn og andre skrøner (skrøner)
- 1988 Signalkanonen og andre skrøner (skrøner)
- 1989 Skrøner fra et rejseliv (skrøner)
- 1990 Den sorte mand. Fortællinger fra Afrika, Grønland og Østen (fortællinger)
- 1992 Flere skrøner fra et rejseliv (skrøner)
- 1992 Kløften
- 1993 Haldurs ballader og andre skrøner (skrøner)
- 1994 Cirkulæret og andre skrøner (skrøner)
- 1996 Forliset og andre skrøner (skrøner)
- 1997 Den gode væver. Fortællinger fra Afrika, Canada og Østen (fortællinger)
- 1998 En antikvarboghandlers erindring
- 1999 Den pjaltede mand og andre skrøner
- 2001 Samlede skrøner fra Nordøstgrønland: 1974-1980 (samlet udg.)
- 2001 Samlede skrøner fra Nordøstgrønland: 1986-1996 (samlet udg.)
- 2002 Avigtat: eskimoliv (illustreret)
- 2002 Samlede skrøner fra et rejseliv (samlet udg.)

== Literature Awards, Grants and Prizes ==
- 1972 - Statens Kulturfond - Engangsydelse (The Cultural Committee of the Danish State - One time fee)
- 1973 - Statens Kulturfond - Engangsydelse (The Cultural Committee of the Danish State - One time fee)
- 1974 - Statens Kulturfond - Engangsydelse (The Cultural Committee of the Danish State - One time fee)
- 1981 - Frank Hellers litterære pris (Literature Prize of Frank Heller)
- 1993 - Tom Kristensen Legatet
- 1995 - De Gyldne Laurbær (The Golden Laurel, the Danish booksellers literature prize)
- 1996 - Drassows Legat
- 2004 - Jeanne og Henri Nathansens Mindelegat
- 2004 - Statens Kunstfond. Livsvarig ydelse (The Cultural Committee of the Danish State - Lifelong grant)
- 2010 - Det Danske Akademis Store Pris (The Grand Prize of the Danish Academy)
