= Marie-Thérèse Fortin =

Canadian actress

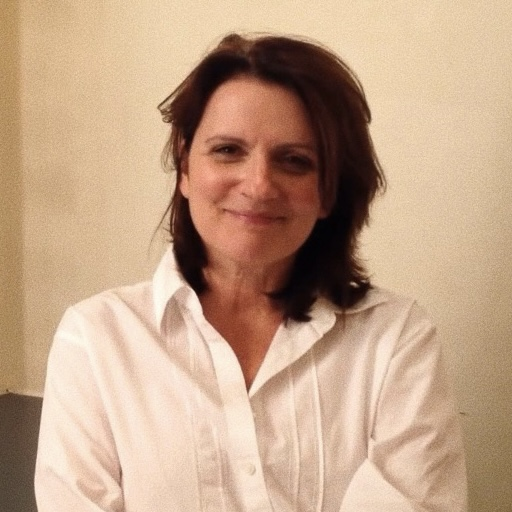
- Born: April 14, 1959 (age 67); Saint-Octave-de-Métis, Quebec, Canada
- Occupation: Actress
- Years active: 1985-present

Marie-Thérèse Fortin (born April 14, 1959) is a Canadian actress. She has appeared in over twenty films since 1985.

== Selected filmography ==
Year	Title	Role	Notes
2006	Without Her (Sans elle)		
2009	Heat Wave		
2010	The Hair of the Beast (Le Poil de la bête)	Sœur Margot	
2012	Inch'Allah		
2016	Le Fils de Jean	Angie	
2021	Virage	Christiane Lessard	Two episodes
2023	Ru		
2025	Veins (Nervures)		
