= Suzie (film) =

- Directed by: Micheline Lanctôt
- Written by: Micheline Lanctôt
- Produced by: André Gagnon
- Starring: Micheline Lanctôt
- Cinematography: François Dutil
- Edited by: Aube Foglia
- Music by: Claude Challe; François Lanctôt
- Distributed by: Les Films Séville
- Release date: 17 April 2009
- Running time: 94 minutes
- Country: Canada
- Language: French

Suzie is a 2009 French-Canadian drama film directed by and starring Micheline Lanctôt.

== Plot ==
Suzie (Micheline Lanctôt), a 58-year-old taxi driver suffering from depression, finds a 10-year-old autistic boy named Charles (Gabriel Gaudreault) alone in the back seat of her cab one Halloween night. The boy's mother has left him with a note directing that he be taken to his father. Suzie takes Charles to his father, and thus gets drawn into a conflict between the boy's parents. Realizing the parents have no idea what to do with their son, Suzie leaves with him, and proceeds to go to an underground gambling den. She wins money at poker and buys two plane tickets to Morocco, intending to search for her daughter, who was taken to the country by her father twenty years ago.

== Cast ==
- Micheline Lanctôt as Suzie
- Gabriel Gaudreault as Charles
- Pascale Bussières as Viviane
- Normand Daneau as Pierre
- Marie-Yong Godbout-Turgeon as Caroline
- Fayolle Jean as Cerfrère
- Lulu Hughes as Constable
- Artur Gorishti as Fatos
- Suzanne Garceau as Psychiatrist
