= Jim Donovan (director) =

Canadian TV director and film director

- Born: 1964 (age 61–62); Quebec, Canada
- Occupations: Director, screenwriter
- Known for: 3 Seasons; Believe Me: The Abduction of Lisa McVey
- Spouse: Carinne Leduc

Jim Donovan (born 1964 in Quebec) is a Canadian television director and film director. He wrote and directed 3 seasons, which won several international awards, including Best Feature at the 2010 Beverly Hills Film Festival, Best Director at the 2009 Mexico International Film Festival, and Best Canadian Feature Film at the 2008 Whistler Film Festival.

== Background ==
He received a 2005 Directors Guild of Canada nomination for Pure, his first feature film. He relocated from Montreal to Toronto in early 2010, and founded Undertow Entertainment in 2011. In 2013, Donovan was presented with a Canadian Screen Award for best director for his work on the television series Flashpoint. In 2014, Donovan was nominated for a Directors Guild of Canada award for Best Drama Television Series for the program Cracked; Ghost Dance.

== Partial filmography ==
=== Films ===
- 2 Mayhem 3, 1996
- Agent Provocateur, 1997
- Pure, 2005
- The Watch, 2008
- 3 Seasons (3 Saisons), 2009
- The Perfect Teacher, 2010
- Believe Me: The Abduction of Lisa McVey, 2018

=== Television series ===
- Cracked - seasons 1 and 2
- Are You Afraid of the Dark? - season 5
- Instant Star- seasons 2 and 3
- Flashpoint - season 4, 5, 7
