= Before Tomorrow =

Canadian drama film

- Directed by: Marie-Hélène Cousineau; Madeline Ivalu
- Written by: Susan Avingaq; Marie-Hélène Cousineau; Madeline Ivalu
- Based on: Før Morgendagen by Jørn Riel
- Produced by: Stéphane Rituit
- Starring: Madeline Ivalu; Paul-Dylan Ivalu
- Cinematography: Norman Cohn; Félix Lajeunesse
- Edited by: Norman Cohn; Marie-Hélène Cousineau; Louise Dugal; Félix Lajeunesse
- Music by: Anna McGarrigle; Kate McGarrigle; Joel Zifkin; Michael Reinhart
- Production company: Igloolik Isuma Productions
- Distributed by: Alliance Motion Picture Distribution
- Release date: September 7, 2008 (TIFF)
- Running time: 93 minutes
- Country: Canada
- Language: Inuktitut

Before Tomorrow (French: Le jour avant le lendemain) is a 2008 Canadian drama film, directed by Marie-Hélène Cousineau and Madeline Ivalu. The film is an adaptation of the novel Før Morgendagen by Danish writer Jørn Riel. It was the third film released by Igloolik Isuma Productions, an Inuit film studio best known for the film Atanarjuat: The Fast Runner, and is the first feature film to be made by Arnait Video Productions, a women's Inuit film collective.

Set in a small Inuit community in the Nunavik region of northern Quebec in the 1840s, the film stars Madeline Ivalu as Ninioq, an Inuk elder isolated with her grandson Maniq (Paul-Dylan Ivalu) after most of their community perishes from smallpox transmitted by strange traders. "Their adaptation moves the setting from northeast Greenland to northwest Ungava (Nunavik) and from the 1960s to the 1840s, when explorers and whalers began to trade with local Inuit and transmitted contagious diseases." The film was shot near Puvirnituq in Nunavik, northern Quebec.

== Plot ==
The story of the film happens in about 1840, some of the Inuit tribes still have never met any white people, but they hear about where they come from, what they want do and the reason.

In summer, two isolated families meet each other again, the young people get married, the elder tell stories to the young, they are planning for the food that can help them spending over winter. Although everything seems goes well, Ningiuq, an old woman of strength and wisdom, cannot stop worrying. She thinks that the surrounding is unstable, so she wants to think about her life.

After a good harvest of fishing, the families decide to dry what they caught on an isolated island, which are safe from dogs and other animals. Ningiuq volunteers to take on this chore, and her grandson, Maniq follows her, as well as the old Kutuguk, which is Ningiuq's friend who is ill. At the island, three of them are waiting for the return of hunter when cold autumn starts but nobody comes. Kutuguk dies, Ningiuq and Maniq bury her. When the first snow comes, Ningiuq decides to return to the main camp with Maniq to see what happened to the others.

When Ningiuq and Maniq returned to the main camp, they find that everyone is dead, their bodies twisted in pain and covered with blisters. Ningiuq finds objects known to belong to the white foreigners beside the body. Ningiuq and Maniq goes back to the island. Their tent is destroyed and they find a cave to live in. Ningiuq uses her wisdom and her survival skills to try to cheer Maniq up. They survive an attack by wolves but Ningiuq is injured. Some time after the wolf attack Ningiuq feels her own death coming....

== Cast ==
- Peter-Henry Arnatsiaq as Apak
- Madeline Ivalu as Ninioq
- Paul-Dylan Ivalu as Maniq
- Mary Qulitalik as Kuutujuk
- Tumasie Sivuarapik as Kukik

== Awards ==
The film garnered numerous Genie Award nominations at the 30th Genie Awards, including Best Motion Picture, Best Actor (Paul-Dylan Ivalu), Best Actress (Madeline Ivalu), Best Director and Best Adapted Screenplay (Cousineau, Ivalu and Susan Avingaq). Four Quebec Jutra Award nominations, Best Picture, Director, Costumes, Music. It also won the award for Best Canadian First Feature Film at the 2008 Toronto International Film Festival.

== Reaction ==
The film reflects on the culture, tradition, and the spiritual values of Inuit. "Before Tomorrow, a profound, elemental and hauntingly beautiful period drama that makes an intimate story of endurance into a metaphor for an entire culture." Some people think the film is a little inadequate. "The film's only misstep is its musical book-ends - Kate and Anna McGarrigle performing a song with the recurring refrain of 'Why must we die", a sentimentality at odds with the film's tone."

Stanley Kauffmann of The New Republic wrote- 'Imperfect film-making but a warm and interesting experience.'.
