= Susan Avingaq =

Canadian film director and writer (1942–2024)

- Born: December 1942; Camp Kapuivik, near Igloolik, Nunavut
- Died: August 1, 2024 (aged 81)
- Years active: 1991–present

Susan Avingaq (December 1942 – August 1, 2024) was an Inuk Canadian film director, producer, screenwriter, and actress. A founding partner in Arnait Video Productions, a women's filmmaking collective based in Igloolik, Nunavut, she is most noted for her work on the film Before Tomorrow (Le jour avant le lendemain), for which she received Genie Award nominations for Best Adapted Screenplay, Best Art Direction/Production Design and Best Original Song ("Pamani") at the 30th Genie Awards in 2010.

She was also credited as a producer or executive producer of the films Uvanga and Tia and Piujuq, a costume designer for The Journals of Knud Rasmussen and Searchers, an art director on Uvanga and Searchers, and co-director of the documentary films Anaana and Sol.

She published two children's books, Fishing with Grandma (2015) and The Pencil (2018), in collaboration with Maren Vsetula and illustrator Charlene Chua, and performed as a storyteller on the children's television series Anaana's Tent and in Laakkuluk Williamson Bathory's theatrical show Kiviuq Returns.

Avingaq died on August 1, 2024, at the age of 81.
