= Running while black =

Racial profiling of runners of color

Running while Black is a sardonic description of racial profiling experienced by Black runners in the United States and Canada. In the United States, jogging gained popularity after World War II, and has largely been portrayed by American media as an activity typically engaged in by white people; joggers of color are treated with suspicion. Black runners report taking precautions such as wearing bright colors to appear non-threatening, avoiding running outside of daylight hours, running in groups for safety, and avoiding running fast enough to appear to be "running away from something."

In 2021, Lyndsey Hornbuckle found that the issue was particularly common when Black people were running in white neighborhoods, and especially higher socioeconomic white neighborhoods.

Sonia Sanchez's 1968 play The Bronx is Next includes a scene in which a white police officer arrests a Black person for running while Black. The 2000 US Supreme Court case Illinois v. Wardlow, which upheld the legality of a police search of a person based on the person running from police, has been described by civil libertarians as creating a new criminal offense of "running while Black." Examples of racial incidents due to "running while Black" also include the 2015 death of Freddie Gray in Baltimore, the 2015 arrest of Jimmy Thoronka in London, a 2019 incident in Vancouver, Canada, and the 2020 murder of Ahmaud Arbery in Georgia, U.S.

== See also ==
- "... while black"
  - Biking while Black
  - Traveling While Black
  - Driving while black
  - Dying While Black
  - Shopping while Black
  - While Black with MK Asante
- The talk (racism in the United States)
  - Voting while Black
  - Learning while Black
  - Eating while Black
