= Traveling While Black =

Canadian-American virtual reality documentary film

- Film poster
- Directed by: Roger Ross Williams
- Produced by: Ayesha Nadarajah; Jihan Robinson; Lina Srivastava
- Music by: Jason Moran
- Production company: Felix & Paul Studios
- Release date: January 25, 2019 (Sundance)
- Running time: 20 minutes
- Countries: Canada; United States

Traveling While Black is a Canadian-American coproduced virtual reality documentary film project, directed by Roger Ross Williams and released in 2019. An examination of racism in the United States, the film is an immersive experience which places the viewer inside the context of African-American travellers seeking safety and security with the help of the Negro Motorist Green Book; Williams has contrasted it with the 2018 film Green Book, labelling it as "a totally different story because [Traveling While Black] is a story of life or death, and danger, and community, and all of those things. But it’s our story. It’s for us to tell. It’s not for anyone else." The film is based on a 2010 play called The Green Book.

The film premiered in the New Frontier program at the 2019 Sundance Film Festival, before being released later in the year on Oculus VR platforms. In 2020, the film was selected for inclusion in the online We Are One: A Global Film Festival.

The film was shot in Ben's Chili Bowl, a famous restaurant in Washington, D.C., founded in 1958.

== Awards ==
The film received an Emmy Award nomination for Outstanding Interactive Program at the 71st Primetime Creative Arts Emmy Awards in 2019, and won the Canadian Screen Award for Best Immersive Experience at the 8th Canadian Screen Awards in 2020.

== See also ==
- "... while black"
  - Biking while black
  - Traveling While Black
  - Driving while black
  - Dying While Black
  - Running while black
  - Shopping while black
  - While Black with MK Asante
- The talk (racism in the US)
  - Voting while black
  - Learning while black
  - Eating while black
