= Dying While Black =

2006 book by Vernellia Randall

- Author: Vernellia Randall
- Language: English
- Genre: Non-fiction
- Publisher: Seven Principles Press
- Publication date: 2006
- ISBN: 0-9779160-0-6

Dying While Black by Vernellia Randall is a book about the disparities between the health care administered to African Americans and that administered to European Americans. She states that these disparities, the black health deficit, are caused by the continuation of the slave health deficit. She encourages reparation in the form of long term monetary and legal commitments and a comprehensive civil rights health care law.

== Summary ==
The book begins with statistics of short life expectancy, high death rates, high infant mortality, low birth weight rates, and high disease rates as compared to European Americans. Randall states that they are a direct result of slavery and the lack of health care that was provided from the time of slavery to the Jim Crow laws, the Affirmative Action time, and to the Racial Entrenchment time of the present. She points out the racial barriers to the access of health care, nursing homes, hospitals, physicians, and other professionals. In addition, she acknowledges a lack of minority health professionals and thus a shortage of minority input into the health care system. She insists that the health care system rid itself of intentional and inadvertent racism. The managed care organizations entice providers and facilitators to engage in discrimination. This has also led to a mistrust of the health care system by blacks. Randall insists that this is not simply paranoia but is based on a history of experimentation, Sickle Cell Screening Initiative, planning/involuntary sterilization, and the excuses that the medical system gave to justify its discriminations. These abuses contribute to her accusation of the human rights violations by institutional racism in the health care system, the large inequality in health status, and the lack of legal protection. She concludes her book with the authenticity of her call for reparations from the American government. The slave health deficit will continue to negatively impact African Americans unless a well planned legal program is enacted.

== See also ==
- "... while black"
  - Biking while black
  - Traveling While Black
  - Driving while black
  - Dying While Black
  - Running while black
  - Shopping while black
  - While Black with MK Asante
- The talk (racism in the US)
  - Voting while black
  - Learning while black
  - Eating while black
