= Drug interdiction in United States law enforcement =

Drug interdiction, the interruption and interception of drugs to prevent them from reaching their destination, is a tactic often used by U.S. law enforcement in the context of traffic stops. Law enforcement use pretextual traffic stops in order to stop drivers. Pretextual stops are traffic stops conducted by law enforcement for a traffic violation, but the purpose is for the officer to investigate an unrelated crime that the driver was not stopped for. A law enforcement officer can learn about a potential suspect from a traffic stop by identifying the driver, engaging in conversation with them, and conducting a visual inspection of the vehicle's interior. This is useful in drug interdiction because the officer essentially has the driver in a position where they are not allowed to leave, so the officer can use their skills in order to elicit information that may lead to an arrest. In Whren v. United States, the Supreme Court ruled that the motivation underlying a traffic stop is irrelevant as long as the officer has probable cause for the traffic violation they are stopping the driver for. When law enforcement observes a traffic violation they automatically have probable cause to stop the vehicle.

== Tactics ==
Drug interdiction is based on law enforcement observing the behaviors of the drivers they are stopping, or planning to stop. Law enforcement is trained to always be watching and listening. Every driver is different and will respond to stressful stimuli in different ways. Drivers can experience stress when being stopped by law enforcement, which will change the way that they behave. Communication can be expressed in many different ways such as body language, tone of voice, and spoken words. How a driver acts when seeing a law enforcement officer parked on the side of the road is an important observation. Indicators can include the driver suddenly hit their brakes or start making sudden movements in their vehicle, which is observed by for law enforcement, and may lead to law enforcement wanting to find probable cause to stop the vehicle.

Agencies can use spatial optimization in drug interdiction which is how an agency determines what law enforcement resources should be allocated in order to effectively disrupt the illegal activity. Spatial optimization informs the agency's decision on what resources should be placed where, and in what numbers. The focus of spatial optimization in drug interdiction is the use of interdiction-related resources. For example, these resources would be the number of officers needed, what kind of training of those officers is needed, and testing kits in order to test for possible drugs that may be found. Spatial optimization models focus on locating interdiction resources rather than modifying the drug networks structure or how it may flow. Determining the location for interdiction operations is an important part of spatial optimization, so agencies can decide where they are sending their officers and the other resources that are needed. Spatial optimization obtains the source or origin of the drug trafficking network, so the resources needed can be sent to the right place in order to be the most effective. Where and how many officers are sent can be detrimental to disrupting that network by using drug interdiction. Different formulations of spatial optimization are tested on drug trafficking networks that cannot realistically represent the environment or location that is unique to counterdrug interdiction.

== Effectiveness ==
Drug interdiction can be effective using many tactics to counteract the movement of illicit drugs. In 2005, the U.S. federal government spent $2.6 billion dollars to disrupt and deter the transport of illicit drugs. In 1995, the United States Customs reported about 2,200 cocaine seizures, about 900 heroin seizures, and about 10,000 marijuana seizures, over 50 percent of all drugs seized by federal agencies, and participation in the seizure of an additional 13 percent of the total drugs seized. Drug Interdiction can be shown to have great effort of stopping drug trafficking in the United States.

Programs in drug interdiction can help with the effectiveness of drug interdiction. A program that exists within drug interdiction is called Operation Pipeline. Operation Pipeline's intent is to be able to train law enforcement officers in the law of traffic stops and drug prosecution. Operation Pipeline is the intensified enforcement to find illegal drugs by generating a higher volume of legal traffic stops to screen for criminal activity, which may include drug trafficking, or other possible illegal activities Operation Pipeline is considered to be constitutional and legal, as long as law enforcement is not basing their stops on race or ethnicity. Another program that exists for drug interdiction is called Operation Hard Line. Operation Hard Line is the United States Customs drug interdiction program that is used at the border of the United States to address violence and drug smuggling. This specific drug interdiction program focuses primarily on intensified inspections, improved facilities, and the use of technology.

In 2002, at least 12 states had passed laws that require record keeping on the race and ethnicity of every car that is stopped by law enforcement. This record keeping can be used to track possible racial profiling by law enforcement, and help combat that issue while trying to keep it from happening.

== Problems ==
Black motorists are more likely in the United States to be searched than white motorists are. Racial profiling is a problem that can exist within drug interdiction. Racial profiling is defined as the practice of using a drivers race as criteria for the search of a vehicle. Racial profiling can also occur when law enforcement stops, questions, arrests, investigates, or searches a driver because law enforcement believes that members of that race or ethnicity group are more likely to commit the crime that the officer in investigating. In 2002, Maryland State Police engaged in racial profiling to which they stopped and searched cars with Black and Hispanic drivers more often than they did with white drivers that they stopped. Nearly two-thirds of these Black and Hispanic drivers that were stopped were not actually carrying any illegal drugs. More recently, some policymakers have brought increased attention to this issue as law enforcement agencies across the United States have faced allegations of racial profiling.

Law enforcement officers can face many dangers when using drug interdiction. Many officers have been injured and disabled while practicing the fundamentals of drug interdiction. Methamphetamines are one of the most common drugs today. Meth labs are also becoming more common in vehicles. Cooking in vehicles has become more common because people can drive around while chemicals are processing. Law enforcement has been injured from touching these chemicals or even by inhaling them. Fentanyl is also becoming more common in the United States today, which can often be mixed with other drugs. Just two milligrams of fentanyl is considered to be a lethal dose. Fentanyl can be found in a powered form, which could accidentally be inhaled by law enforcement, which is what makes it so dangerous. Other drugs are also in powdered form, which may not have the same lethal effect that Fentanyl has, but law enforcement can still experience the side effects those other drugs can have. It is important that law enforcement takes safety precautions when dealing with possible drugs and labs while on the road.
