= Chris Plante =

American radio personality (1959-)

- Born: Christopher Orteig; 12 December 1959 (age 66); Milwaukee, Wisconsin, U.S.
- Education: New Trier High School; Santa Barbara City College; University of California, Santa Barbara
- Occupation: Radio Talk Show Host
- Spouse: Sarah Gilmore de Ruiter (married 1983-1989)
- Parent(s): Jules Orteig (father); Bill Plante (stepfather); Barbara Barnes Orteig Plante (mother)
- Relatives: Patrick H. Barnes (grandfather)
- Awards: Edward R. Murrow Award; Media Research Center Bulldog Award (2023); Accuracy in Media Reed Irvine Award for Excellence in Journalism (2015)

Christopher Plante (born December 12, 1959) is an American talk radio host and journalist currently hosting a syndicated radio program heard on Westwood One and a nightly TV talk show on Newsmax TV.

== Early life ==
Plante was born in Milwaukee, Wisconsin to Jules and Barbara (née Barnes) Orteig. His maternal grandfather Pat Barnes was a Chicago-based radio host and World War I veteran. After his father Jules died in 1960, his mother Barbara re-married in 1965 to journalist Bill Plante. The family later moved to the Chicago area; Chris Plante later lived in Glenview and Winnetka, Illinois and graduated from New Trier West High School. He later attended Santa Barbara City College and the University of California, Santa Barbara but withdrew before graduating in order to work full-time in news.

== Career ==
=== CNN ===
Plante worked at CNN from 1988 to 2005, mostly covering The Pentagon and U.S. Military. At various times at CNN, he was a Pentagon correspondent, senior producer for national security affairs, military affairs producer, and an assignment editor. Plante traveled to foreign locations, including Saudi Arabia, Bosnia, Vietnam, Indonesia, Africa, and the former Soviet Union covering stories for CNN.

=== Radio ===
After leaving CNN, Plante joined Washington talk station WMAL as a weekend host in 2005. He sometimes hosted a joint show with liberal host Jerry Klein.

In 2005, Plante moved to weeknights, and in 2008 he moved to the midday time slot. In 2009, Plante's show was briefly replaced by The Joe Scarborough Show, but demand from fans saw his return to the 9 AM – Noon time slot in October 2009. Guest hosts include Mary Walter and Mike Opelka.

Plante has filled in for national hosts including Mark Levin, Michael Savage and Rush Limbaugh.

In 2016, Cumulus Media announced Plante would be nationally syndicated by Westwood One, replacing Herman Cain's program, which reverted to a local program. The Herman Cain Show would still air in the Atlanta, Jacksonville, Orlando, Tulsa, and Dayton markets. Westwood One and Plante's home station, WMAL, are both owned by Cumulus Media.

=== Newsmax ===
In May 2023, Newsmax announced it would broadcast a new 9 PM panel show titled Chris Plante The Right Squad. The show will film in Washington DC and will feature Plante, Jenn Pellegrino, and other regular panelists.

== Awards ==
Plante received the Edward R. Murrow Award from the Radio Television Digital News Association (RTNDA) for his reporting from the Pentagon during the terrorist attacks on September 11, 2001.

In 2015, Plante won a Reed Irvine Award for Excellence in Journalism from Accuracy in Media.
