= Flying while Muslim =

Post-9/11 profiling and other difficulties for Muslims traveling by air

Flying while Muslim is a sardonic description of problems that Muslim passengers have faced on airplanes, during stopovers, or at airports in the aftermath of the September 11 attacks. It is a snowclone inspired by "driving while black"—itself a snowclone of "driving while intoxicated"—which similarly satirizes racial profiling of African Americans by police and other law enforcement.

== Incidents ==
An early usage of the phrase is dated mid-September 2001.

The issue was brought to media attention in 2006 when six Muslim imams were removed from a US Airways flight after they allegedly engaged in suspicious behavior reminiscent of that of the 9/11 hijackers.

In 2009, AirTran Airways removed nine Muslim passengers, including three children, from a flight and turned them over to the FBI after one of the men commented to another that they were sitting right next to the engines and wondered aloud where the safest place to sit on the plane was. Although the FBI subsequently cleared the passengers and called the incident a "misunderstanding", AirTran refused to seat the passengers on another flight, forcing them to purchase last minute tickets on another airline that had been secured with the FBI's assistance. A spokesman for AirTran initially defended the airline's actions and said they would not reimburse the passengers for the cost of the new tickets. Although the men had traditional beards and the women headscarves, AirTran denied that their actions were based on the passengers' appearance. The following day, after the incident received widespread media coverage, AirTran reversed its position and issued a public apology, adding that it would in fact reimburse the passengers for the cost of their rebooked tickets.

=== Southwest Airlines ===
On March 13, 2011, a Pakistani American hijabi woman was removed from a Southwest Airlines flight due to a crew member mishearing her say "It's a go" on her cellphone when she actually said "I have to go" in reference to the woman's flight takeoff. After being cleared to return, the pilot refused to let her in the flight, saying that her presence made the crew members uncomfortable. The woman was given a voucher and placed on the next flight.

On November 18, 2015, in two separate incidents, passengers at Midway Airport were allegedly not permitted to fly aboard Southwest Airlines flights when other passengers claimed to be afraid to fly with them because they were speaking Arabic, or appeared to be Muslim. The refusal sparked widespread condemnation on the airline's social media pages and received prominent coverage, in the US and internationally, accompanied by calls for a boycott of the airline. According to The Economist, "in the two Southwest cases, it was the passengers themselves conducting their own vigilante profiling; the airline was merely bowing to their demands."

On April 6, 2016, Southwest Airlines removed a passenger from a flight at Los Angeles International Airport for speaking Arabic before pushback. The FBI detained the passenger, searched his belongings and questioned him for several hours. A Southwest spokesperson declined to apologize and defended Southwest's decisions by saying "We will not be apologizing for following our obligation to adhere to established procedures". The passenger, Khairuldeen Makhzoomi, an Iraqi refugee, later said that those actions were "playing straight into the rhetoric of the Islamic State—they fall into the trap" and, "That is when I couldn't handle it and my eyes began to water ... the way they searched me and the dogs, the officers, people were watching me and the humiliation made me so afraid because it brought all of these memories back to me. I escaped Iraq because of the war, because of Saddam and what he did to my father."

On April 15, 2016, Southwest removed a Muslim passenger from a flight at Midway Airport after she traded seats with several other passengers. A spokesperson from the Council on American–Islamic Relations called on Southwest to explain their actions and the passenger's husband said "She was humiliated because of her religion and the way she dressed".

== See also ==
- Airport racial profiling in the United States
- Islamophobia
- Northwest Airlines Flight 327
- Persecution of Muslims
- Stereotypes of Arabs and Muslims in the United States
