= Driving while black =

Racial profiling of African American drivers

"Driving while black" (DWB) is a sardonic description of racial profiling of African-American motor vehicle drivers. It implies that a motorist may be stopped by a police officer largely because of racial bias rather than any apparent violation of traffic law. It is a word play on the phrase "driving while intoxicated".

== Origins ==
The phrase "driving while black" has been used in both the public and private discourse relating to the racial profiling of black motorists. The term rose to prominence during the 1990s, when it was brought to public knowledge that American police officers were intentionally targeting racial minorities to curb the trafficking of drugs. For example, New Jersey released state documents in 2000 which showed police training memos instructing officers to make racial judgments in order to identify "Occupant Identifiers for a possible Drug Courier" on the highway.

The phrase was magnified after the ruling of Whren v. United States (1996), when the Supreme Court of the United States ruled that police officers may stop any motor vehicle operator if any traffic violation has been observed.

Subsequent media coverage of the phrase "driving while black" since the 1990s has been expansive and more common. The phrase is often used in anecdotal accounts of racial profiling of motor vehicle operators as well as statistical and legal analyses of racial profiling, a notable example being the case of Tolan v. Cotton.

In 2014 Portland lawyers Melvin Oden-Orr and Marianne Hyland created an app named "Driving While Black" in which users can record police and alert people when they are stopped by police on the road. It also supplies users with information on how to handle a traffic stop, including their legal rights and "best practices" for "how to be safe". The American Civil Liberties Union (ACLU) released a similar app called "Mobile Justice" in which users can record and upload videos to the ACLU office.

The phrase DWB was amplified through social media by which African Americans can record police encounters and disseminate them to a large audience. The phrase was used in the media after the deaths of African Americans Sandra Bland (2015) and Philando Castile (2016), both of whom were stopped by police while driving.

== Studies ==
=== Nationwide ===
In 2019, as reported by NBC, the Stanford Open Policing Project found that "police stopped and searched black and Latino drivers on the basis of less evidence than used in stopping white drivers, who are searched less often but are more likely to be found with illegal items." The finding emerged from data-mining nearly 100 million traffic stops dating from 2011 to 2017 and recorded by 21 state patrol agencies, including California, Illinois, New York, and Texas, and 29 municipal police departments, including New Orleans, Philadelphia, San Francisco, and St. Paul, Minnesota.

=== Florida ===
The American Civil Liberties Union reported that in 2014, Florida-resident black drivers received nearly 22 percent of all seat belt citations even though they made up only 13.5 percent of that state's drivers. Seat belt compliance was 91.5 percent for white drivers versus 85.8 percent for black drivers, a difference too small to explain the different rate of ticketing between black and white drivers. The ACLU analysis showed that black drivers would have had over 14,000 fewer seat belt citations if they were ticketed proportionally to total drivers in Florida. The rate that black drivers are ticketed more often than white drivers is four times more in Escambia County, three times more in Palm Beach County and 2.8 times more in Orange County. In Tampa, black drivers received 575 seat belt citations versus 549 for white drivers even though black people make up only 23 percent of Tampa's population.

=== Illinois ===
On April 18, 2003, the Illinois State Senate passed a bill that mandates Illinois law enforcement to maintain racial statistics regarding traffic stops. The bill originally mandated the statistics-keeping to continue until 2007, but the bill was extended and traffic stop statistics will continue to be maintained indefinitely. An ACLU analysis of the 2013 Illinois traffic stop report found that African Americans and Latinos are "twice as likely" to be pulled over by police even though whites were more likely to have been discovered with contraband in their car.

=== Maryland ===
In Robert L. Wilkins, et al. v. Maryland State Police, et al. (1993), the ACLU sued the Maryland State Police for racial profiling of then defense attorney Robert L. Wilkins. Part of the settlement agreement between the parties held that the state of Maryland had to maintain racial statistics regarding its traffic stops, making Maryland the first to do so. The case started a "national conversation on racial profiling" and was seen as a large victory by the ACLU. Lamberth conducted a study again in the state of Maryland, once again finding evidence of racial discrimination in traffic stops, although the scope of his study was more limited.

=== New Jersey ===
In New Jersey v. Soto (1996), a case where Superior Court Justice Robert E. Francis consolidated 17 claims of racial profiling in traffic stops, Dr. John Lamberth of Temple University conducted a study to determine the level to which racial discrimination occurred on the highway in the state of New Jersey. Lamberth found that cars driven by African Americans accounted for about 42% of the total drivers pulled over out of a total 43,000 cars. However, cars operated by African Americans accounted only for 13.5% of the total cars on the road.

New Jersey later received public attention for its racial profiling on the highway in 1998 when police wounded three men during a traffic stop, all of whom were either black or Hispanic, prompting then New Jersey Governor Christine Whitman to let a federal judge monitor the NJ police. As a result, thousands of documents were released to the public, displaying ample evidence that police were instructed to use race-based tactics to identify and stop possible drug couriers on the highway.

=== Kentucky ===
The Louisville Metro Police Department (LMPD) has received negative public attention for "hyper-policing" to fight violent crime in the West End of Louisville. In 2016, Jefferson County Circuit Judge Brian Edwards threw out evidence obtained in a traffic stop saying he is "well aware of the troubling levels of gun and drug-related violence in west Louisville." Edward added, "this does not mean that citizens driving in west Louisville should be subjected to a lesser degree of constitutional protection than citizens driving in other parts our community."

In 2019, Tae-Ahn Lea sued LMPD claiming that his civil rights were violated when he was pulled over, searched and handcuffed by officers, after he allegedly made a wide turn. The case became controversial after 1 million views on YouTube. Police officials said that they aggressively stop motorists in high-crime areas in order to reduce crime. But in its investigation of the story, the Louisville Courier-Journal reported that studies show increased traffic stops do not reduce crime.

== Examples ==
A number of well-known African Americans have described experiences they characterize as of being racially profiled in their cars and some have related it to the phenomenon of DWB.

In his memoir, The Sky Is Not the Limit: Adventures of an Urban Astrophysicist, prominent astrophysicist Neil deGrasse Tyson recounts his many encounters with police on the road and their ambiguous reasons for pulling him over. After learning about other African American physicists who have had similar encounters, he writes, "we were guilty not of DWI (driving while intoxicated), but of other violations none of us knew were on the books: DWB (driving while black), WWB (walking while black), and of course, JBB (just being black)."

Senator Tim Scott of South Carolina, the only African-American Republican in the Senate, spoke on the Senate floor in 2016 about how he experienced racial profiling while driving in his car, adding "I do not know many African-American men who do not have a very similar story to tell – no matter their profession, no matter their income, no matter their disposition in life."

In 2015 comedian Chris Rock posted a series of different pictures on Twitter of himself in the driver's seat of his car while being pulled over by police, captioning one of his posts, "Stopped by the cops again wish me luck." The posts came just a year after racial profiling in the U.S. had become a salient topic in the public following the killings of Eric Garner and Michael Brown by police. CNN's Don Lemon stipulated that "Chris Rock may be in the middle of a case of Driving While Black."

In 2016, tennis player Serena Williams made a public Facebook post in which she spoke about the fears she had for her nephew after he had driven her to her matches. Likely referring to the death of Sandra Bland, she spoke about her worries that her nephew might be harmed by a police officer after being pulled over. The New York Times documented her post in an article titled "'I Won't Be Silent': Serena Williams on the Fear of Driving While Black".

Other prominent African Americans who have recounted their personal experiences of racial profiling include but are not limited to Barack Obama, Johnnie Cochran, Will Smith, Gary Sheffield, and Eric Holder.

There have also been accusations of excessive force by police officers against black drivers. In this example, a police officer tries to explain a fear of blacks: Breaion King, an African-American elementary school teacher, was stopped for speeding in June 2015 in Austin, Texas. Officer Bryan Richter ordered King out of her car, and then threw her violently to the ground while arresting her in a parking lot. King felt the officer's reaction was because she was responding too slowly to the officer's orders. She was charged with resisting arrest as well as speeding. When another officer, Patrick Spradlin, was driving King to jail, he answered the question of "why are so many people afraid of black people". Spradlin's answer was because of "violent tendencies" adding "I don't blame" white people for being afraid of blacks "because of their appearance and whatnot, some of them are very intimidating". Austin Police Chief Art Acevedo found the incident disturbing and put both officers involved under investigation. Prosecutors dropped the charge of resisting arrest, but King still had to pay a $165 fine for speeding.

== Analysis ==
In a 2016 report, Vice News and a group from the Seton Hall Law School found that 70 percent of all police traffic stops in Bloomfield, New Jersey were against black and Latino drivers even though 60 percent of the residents were white. According to Bloomfield's police director, Samuel A DeMaio, violations were 576 against Hispanics, 574 against blacks and 573 against whites from a recent period. In explaining why blacks and Hispanics had disproportionately more violations than whites, DeMaio said it was not racial profiling nor was it a case of blacks and Latinos being worse drivers. Rather it was because police were concentrated much more in "high-crime" areas, inhabited disproportionally by black and Latino residents, rather than in low-crime areas where whites largely reside. Vice News noticed a heavy police presence in the "high-crime" area where police vigorously pursue misdemeanor violations using tactics such as tailing drivers until they make a mistake, or searching a stopped vehicle for violations that may be unrelated to the reason for the police stop. The Seton Hall group concluded the police were effectively raising revenue for the municipality from people living in or driving through the "high-crime" area.

Police-Public Contact Surveys by the US Bureau of Justice Statistics found that white, black, and Hispanic drivers were stopped by police at similar rates in 2002, 2005, and 2008.

== Pretextual stop ==
In a pretextual stop (also called an investigatory stop), officers pull over people citing a minor issue, then start asking unrelated questions. University of Kansas professor Charles Epp in a study found that black drivers were three times more likely than whites to be subjected to "pretextual" stops, and five times more likely to be searched during them. However, Epp found no difference in the frequency and treatment with which black and white drivers were stopped for serious violations like speeding. The bias, however, was significant for stops over minor issues such as a broken tail light, a missing front plate or a failure to signal a lane change.

For example, Philando Castile had 52 police stops in 14 years prior to the last fatal stop. Half of his charges were dismissed, and none of his convictions were for dangerous offences. The pretext for the fatal stop was a broken tail light, but the real reason was that the police officer thought Castile resembled a robbery suspect.

The Supreme Court ruled in Whren v. United States (1996) that any minor traffic violation is a legitimate justification for a stop, even if the real reason is some other crime-fighting objective. Police chiefs consider pretextual stops as an essential tactic and train their officers to conduct them.

According to an October 2015 article in The New York Times, many police departments use traffic stops as a tool to make contact with the community often in higher crime areas where more African-Americans live. Police hope that by being proactive, criminals will avoid the area. However, criminologists argue that such police stops alienate law-abiding residents and undermine their trust in the police. Traffic stops often lead to searches, arrests and convictions often for minor offences, with a police record that can lead to lifelong difficulties. This makes it difficult for police to obtain community cooperation in preventing and solving crimes. Criminologists doubt that performing more traffic stops leads to reduced crime. Ronald L. Davis, of the Justice Department's Office of Community Oriented Policing Services said: "There is no evidence that just increasing stops reduces crime."

== Variations ==
Variations on the phrase ("snowclones") include "walking while black" for pedestrian offenses, "learning while black" for students in schools, "shopping while black" for browsing in stores, and "eating while black" for restaurants. Actor Danny Glover held a press conference in 1999 because cab drivers in New York City were not stopping for him; this was called "hailing while black". The phenomenon was investigated further on Michael Moore's television series TV Nation.

In 2001, the American Civil Liberties Union convinced the United States Drug Enforcement Administration to repay $7,000 that it had seized from a black businessman in the Omaha, Nebraska airport on the false theory that it was drug money; the ACLU called it "flying while black".

A pain specialist who treats sickle-cell disease patients at Manhattan's Beth Israel Medical Center reported that for many years doctors forced African American sickle-cell sufferers to endure pain because they assumed that blacks would become addicted to medication; Time magazine labeled this "ailing while black".

In late 2013, the phrase "seeking help while black" or "asking for help while black" was coined in response to the deaths of Jonathan Ferrell and Renisha McBride. In separate incidents, Ferrell and McBride, both African-American, were shot and killed after they experienced a motor vehicle accident and went to the nearby home of a white stranger to ask for help.

The phrase is also used with other racial, ethnic and cultural (minority) groups. An example is "flying while Muslim", referring to the scrutiny that Arabs and Muslims face as airline passengers. Variants on "⟨verb⟩ing while female" are also encountered, as are phrases like "walking/traveling/etc. while trans".

Following the Boston Marathon bombing, the phrase Running while Arab has come up on social media (although the bombers in question were not Arab, but Chechen) in response to the interrogation of a Saudi student who, allegedly, acted suspiciously in the vicinity of the attacks. Said suspicious behavior consisted of running away from the area of the blast, something many other people did at the time. His house was searched, but he would later be cleared by law enforcement officials.

In May 2018, after a black Yale student, napping in her common room, was reported to police without justification by a white Yale student, a The Washington Post reporter compiled a list of recent, separate incidents in which black people in North America appear to have been racially profiled while performing innocent activities, and proposed coining corresponding terms such as "napping while black", "couponing while black", "waiting for a school bus while black", and "waiting at Starbucks while black".

In August 2018, 61-year-old Marine veteran Karle Robinson was detained at gunpoint by Kansas police for carrying his television into the house he had bought and was moving into. The ACLU described the incident as "moving while black".

In September 2018, an incident in which Botham Jean was shot and killed at his home in Dallas, Texas, by an off-duty police officer (later revealed to be Amber Guyger) who claimed she mistook his home for her own, was described as a case of "being at home while black".

In November 2018, security guard Jemel Roberson was killed by police in Illinois while Roberson was restraining a suspected active shooter. An ACLU spokesperson condemned the incident, saying "Working as a security guard while black should not be a death sentence. In this case, police were more dangerous to him than an active shooter who he apparently subdued."

Also in November 2018, good samaritan Emantic Bradford Jr. was shot three times and killed by Alabama police while he was attempting to stop a different active shooter. The tragedy was later described as "helping while black".

In December 2018, a bank teller in Ohio denied service to a black customer, and instead called the police, having wrongly concluded that the customer was attempting to cash a fraudulent check. The incident was later described as "banking while black".

In May 2020, the killing of Breonna Taylor was referred to as "sleeping in the sanctity of her own home while black."

In May 2020, The Nation coined the analogous phrase "birding while black" in reference to an incident involving African-American birdwatcher Christian Cooper at the Ramble in New York City's Central Park.

=== Biking while black ===
The phrase cycling while black or biking while black refers to reportedly discriminatory treatment experienced by black cyclists at the hands of police officers. Such apparent discrimination has been the subject of media investigations in cities of the US such as Tampa and Chicago, and the subject of lawsuits elsewhere.

In August 2020, Dijon Kizzee, a cyclist, was shot and killed in the Los Angeles neighborhood of Westmont on by deputies of the Los Angeles County Sheriff's Department (LASD). In the days following, protestors gathered outside of the sheriff's station in South Los Angeles. After several days, these demonstrations turned violent, with sheriff's deputies firing projectiles and tear gas at crowds of demonstrators. Ultimately, 35 people were arrested over four nights of unrest.

== Outside the United States ==
=== Canada ===
In July 2009, a black Canadian named Joel DeBellefeuille was pulled over (for the fourth time in several days) by Longueuil police because, according to documents, "his Quebecois name did not match his skin tone". He refused to provide identification or car insurance documents when requested by the officer, and was accordingly fined by a municipal court. DeBellefeuille filed complaints with the Human Rights Commission and the police, seeking $30,000 in damages. Crown prosecutor Valérie Cohen defending the police claimed that officers were in their rights to check the ownership of the car on a reasonable suspicion: "the officers' actions were comparable to stopping a man for driving a car registered to a woman called 'Claudine'." In December 2012, his tickets were dismissed and the officers were suspended without pay. The judge wrote that the mentioned rationale for pulling over demonstrated flagrant ignorance of Quebec society. DeBellefeuille's provincial human rights complaint could not be pursued because it had been filed too long a time after receiving the initial ticket. In 2020, DeBellefeuille won another court victory over a separate, subsequent racial profiling incident that happened in 2012.

Akwasi Owusu-Bempah, an assistant professor of sociology at the University of Toronto, and Anthony Morgan, a civil rights lawyer, said that in the 1980s and 1990s the RCMP introduced Operation Pipeline, a drug interdiction strategy used in the United States. However, the strategy came under criticism because it directed police officers to allow racial profiling to motivate police stops.

A 2002 analysis by the Toronto Star found that police were more likely to stop black drivers than white drivers in Toronto without evidence of an offense. The Star looked at "out-of-sight" offenses such as failing to update a driver's license or driving without insurance when no other offense was found. "Out-of-sight" offenses could only be discovered if police had some other reason to stop the driver, thus suggesting racial profiling.

In 2003, the Nova Scotia Human Rights Commission ruled that the human rights of Black Canadian boxer Kirk Johnson were violated while driving. Police would repeatedly pull Johnson over, and in one case seized his car because the officer was not satisfied with Johnson's documents.

In March 2019, criminologist Scot Wortley released a study that found that the RCMP in suburban Halifax, Nova Scotia performed street checks five times more often on Black people than white people. Street checks or carding is the police practice of stopping people at random on the street to collect personal information for later storage in a police database.

In July 2021, two RCMP officers in Nova Scotia stopped a car containing a black couple, and ordered the male driver at gunpoint to exit the vehicle with arms raised. After several minutes of explanation, the officers released the couple. The officers discovered that the driver was Dean Simmonds, a Halifax police superintendent and a 20-year veteran of the force. He was wearing plain clothes and was on a grocery trip. His wife in the car was Angela Simmonds, a lawyer and a Liberal Party candidate in the 2021 provincial election. The RCMP officers said their reaction was due to reports of gun shots in the area. The couple planned to launch a complaint of racial profiling with the Civilian Review and Complaints Commission.

=== United Kingdom ===
In July 2020, the British athlete Bianca Williams and the Portuguese sprinter Ricardo dos Santos were stopped and searched while driving in London by Metropolitan Police officers on suspicion of possession of drugs and weapons. After the couple were handcuffed and their child's details taken, police found no suspicious material and no arrests were made. Five officers involved were later referred to disciplinary hearings on charges of gross misconduct. Williams and dos Santos said they had been victims of racial profiling and had been stopped for "driving whilst black".

== In popular culture ==
In a 2007 episode of the comedy show Everybody Hates Chris, after his stern take when being hall monitor, Chris is stopped by his nemesis Joey Caruso, who gives Chris a citation for "WWB - Walking while black".

== See also ==
- "... while black"
  - Biking while black
  - Traveling While Black
  - Driving while black
  - Dying While Black
  - Running while black
  - Shopping while black
  - While Black with MK Asante
- The talk (racism in the United States)
  - Voting while black
  - Learning while black
  - Eating while black
- Civil liberties
- Consent search
- Contempt of cop § Racial aspects
- De-policing
- Fourth Amendment to the United States Constitution (against unreasonable search and seizure)
- Fourteenth Amendment to the United States Constitution (equal protection)
- Incarceration in the United States
- Police harassment
- Police misconduct
- Presumption of guilt
- Race and crime in the United States
- Selective enforcement
  - Ticket fixing
- Stop-and-frisk in New York City
- Stop and identify statutes
- Tenaha, Texas § Asset forfeiture controversy
- Terry stop
- Terry v. Ohio
- Ticket quota
- The Negro Motorist Green Book
- The talk (racism in the United States)
- Traffic stop#Reducing minor traffic stops
- War on drugs
- Whren v. United States
