= Airport racial profiling in the United States =

Activity directed at individuals because of their appearance

Airport racial profiling in the United States is U.S. government activity directed at a suspect or group of suspects because of their race or ethnicity. Under Fourth Amendment analysis, objective factors measure whether law enforcement action is constitutional, and under the Fourteenth Amendment challenges to the practice are assessed under the customary strict scrutiny test for racial classifications.

Since September 11, 2001, there have been reports on increases in racial profiling at airports, particularly targeting people who appear to be Muslim or of Middle Eastern and Maghrebi descent. It has been a routine practice by law enforcement officials to stop individuals who are profiled because of their race and religious and ethnic appearance or who may appear to be "suspicious".

== Background ==
In the weeks following September 11, 2001, federal, state and local law enforcement officials investigated those responsible for the September 11 attacks during which nearly 3,000 people died. They assessed the United States's vulnerability to future acts of terrorism. Investigations showed the suspects of the crime to be of Middle Eastern origin.

In the wake of the September 11 attacks, US officials responded to the fears of air travelers by reinforcing security. Despite more thorough investigation of baggage and increased security staffing, there were so many vast open spaces, exits and entrances at airport hubs that prevention of incidents was problematic.

== Criticism ==
A 2009 study published in the Proceedings of the National Academy of Sciences asserted that, due to terrorists being vastly outnumbered by innocents, racial profiling is no more effective than random profiling. It has also been claimed that any form of profiling is less secure than random profiling, because a terrorist cell can simply have a number of members go through airport security, until one is reliably not profiled, then use that individual to perform an attack. None of the 19 successful hijackers in the September 11 attacks were reported or even remembered by checkpoint supervisors.

Michael Kinsley asked in a 2001 article for Slate magazine if a rational reason exists to single out Arabic-looking men at airport.

King Downing, the national coordinator of the American Civil Liberties Union's Campaign Against Airport Racial Profiling, says he was the victim of profiling by police at Logan International Airport in Boston, MA. He was going to the federal court to challenge a screening technique used around the country that looks at suspicious behavior patterns to identify potential terrorists. Downing alleges he was stopped and questioned by state police after arriving on a flight to attend a meeting on racial profiling. He has sued the Massachusetts Port Authority, which operates the airport, and the Massachusetts State Police, citing they violated his constitutional rights. Downing, who is black and wears a short beard, believes he was targeted because of his race. In his lawsuit, Downing alleges the behavioral screening system used at Logan Airport encourages racial profiling. His lawsuit also seeks a ruling to declare airport racial profiling as unconstitutional.

In 2002, after the September 11 attack on the US, Logan Airport began a program called "Behavior Assessment Screening System" which allows police to question passengers whose behavior appears to be "suspicious". Logan was the first airport in the country to use the system. The plausibility of any benefit from "Behavior Assessment" has been questioned in a 2012 study by G. Stuart Mendenhall and Mark Schmidhofer of the Cato Institute.

== Legality ==
The Fourth Amendment provides that "the right of the people to be secure in their persons, houses, papers, and effects, against unreasonable searches and seizures, shall not be violated". In its 1968 Fourth Amendment ruling, Terry v. Ohio, the U.S. Supreme Court found that reasonable, articulable suspicion was sufficient grounds for a police officer to briefly stop and question a citizen. They ruled that such suspicion must not be based on the officer's "inchoate and unparticularized suspicion or 'hunch,' but on the specific reasonable inferences which he is entitled to draw from the facts in light of his experience." Terry v. Ohio employed a "totality of circumstances" test to determine the reasonableness of police investigatory stops.

== US support ==
The Obama administration's decision to heighten airport security for passengers while traveling to the US from 14 nations triggered a backlash of complaints from Muslim and privacy groups who say President Barack Obama's response to terror threats amounted to little more than racial profiling.

Frank Cilluffo, former special assistant for Homeland Security under then-President George W. Bush, said "airports need to be 'profiling' based on behavior even though it's a 'dirty word.'"

A 2010 poll by USA Today showed Americans were in favor of more intensive security check for people who fit a profile of a terrorist based on age, ethnicity and gender.

== See also ==
- Flying imams incident
- Flying while Muslim
- Islamophobia in the United States
- Racial profiling in the United States
- September 11 attacks
- Detention and search of Indian VIPs at US airports
