= Shopping while black =

Type of marketplace discrimination of black people

"Shopping while black" is a phrase used for the type of marketplace discrimination that is also called "consumer racial profiling", "consumer racism" or "racial profiling in a retail setting", as it applies to black people. Shopping while black is the experience of being denied service or given poor service because one is black.

== Overview ==
"Shopping while black" involves a black person being followed around or closely monitored by a clerk or guard who suspects they may steal, but it can also involve being denied store access, being refused service, use of ethnic slurs, being searched, being asked for extra forms of identification, having purchases limited, being required to have a higher credit limit than other customers, being charged a higher price, or being asked more rigorous questions on applications. It could also mean a request for any item the store actually carries being denied with the store attendant claiming that the item does not exist or is not in stock. This can be the result of store policy, or individual employee prejudice. Consumer racial profiling occurs in many retail environments including grocery stores, clothing shops, department stores and office supply shops, and companies accused of consumer racial profiling have included Eddie Bauer, Office Max, Walmart, Sears, Dillard's, Macy's and Home Depot.

Shopping while black is sometimes also called "shopping while black or brown", but researchers say black people are the most frequently targeted.

Shopping while black has been extensively covered by American news media, including a hidden camera ABC News special in which actors posing as store staff harassed black customers to see how other shoppers would respond, and a Soledad O'Brien segment called "Shopping While Black", part of a CNN special on being black in America. It is usually assumed to occur mainly in the United States, but has also been reported in the United Kingdom, Canada, Switzerland, and the Netherlands.

== Derivation ==
"Shopping while black" is related to driving while black; both phrases refer to racial profiling and mistreatment that may occur due to the subject being black. The concept stems from a history of institutional racism in the United States, United Kingdom and other countries, and relates to racial profiling.

== Incidents ==
In 1995, a young black man shopping at an Eddie Bauer store in suburban Washington, D.C., was accused of having stolen the shirt he was wearing, and was told he would need to leave it behind before leaving the store. He filed a federal civil rights lawsuit alleging "consumer racism", and was awarded $1 million in damages. In 2000, a black man named Billy J. Mitchell was awarded $450,000 in compensatory and punitive damages from Dillard's, after being arrested despite having done nothing wrong. Also in 2000, a black woman unsuccessfully sued Citibank after she was detained after making large purchases with her Citibank Visa card.

In 2002, researchers who conducted in-depth interviews with 75 black people living in black neighborhoods in New York City and Philadelphia found that 35% reported receiving consistently negative treatment when shopping in white neighborhoods, compared with 9% who said they received consistently negative treatment in their own neighborhood.

In his 2003 paper "Racial Profiling by Store Clerks and Security Personnel in Retail Establishments: An Exploration of 'Shopping While Black'", criminologist Shaun L. Gabbidon wrote that the majority of false arrest complaints filed in a retail setting in the United States are filed by African-Americans.

A 2006 analysis of federal court decisions involving marketplace discrimination in the state of Illinois found that both real and perceived racial discrimination existed in the Illinois marketplace.

In 2014, Macy's agreed to pay a $650,000 settlement over claims it had racially profiled customers. In 2014, Barneys had agreed to a $250,000 settlement over a similar claim.

== Causes ==
Some shopkeepers may be trying to minimize costs ("cost-based statistical discrimination"). In these cases, researchers describe the cause of racial profiling as "subconscious racism", with retailers making assumptions about their black clientele based on stereotypes that say blacks are likelier than others to commit crimes and to not be credit-worthy.

== Microaggressions ==
Many black consumers experience microaggressions while shopping. Case Western Assistant Professor Cassi Pittman interviewed middle and working class black consumers in New York. Out of the 55 interviewed for her research, 80% experienced microaggressions and stereotypes while shopping and 59% had been labeled as a shoplifter. Study participants mentioned that they were followed around the store, shown the sale section of a store without being prompted, ignored, or told the price of an expensive clothing item without being prompted. In a survey of white employees, it was determined that staff often rely on stereotypical profiles of black consumers when there is minimal anti-theft training.

Continued black consumer microaggressions may affect the mental and emotional health of its victims. Microaggressions can be subtle and unrecognizable for those not affected. Those who have experienced consumer microaggressions may experience stress and feel inhuman, distressed and disrespected as well as questions one’s own perception of the event, having to repeatedly explain the scenario and the microaggressions and facing any legal implications.

Professor Cassi Pittman has reported that Black consumers have developed strategies to mitigate consumer microaggressions, including only shopping at particular stores, dressing in "professional" clothing to attract or avoid attention, only shopping online and boycotting stores in which they felt discrimination.

== Responses ==
People who have experienced consumer racial profiling have described it as embarrassing, insulting, hurtful and frightening.

Some black shoppers try to avoid racial discrimination either by avoiding white-owned businesses entirely or by deliberately dressing in a middle-class style. Because they are likelier to live and work in majority-white neighborhoods, middle-class black people experience more racial profiling than poorer black people.

Responses to "shopping while black" treatment can be divided into the three categories of exit, voice and loyalty: shoppers can leave the store; complain, boycott or file a lawsuit; or accept the situation and continue shopping. Black people are likelier to launch a boycott against a shop-owner in a majority of black neighborhood rather than a white one. Social psychologists Henri Tajfel and John Turner have described this as pragmatic and rational: a boycott is likelier to succeed in your own neighborhood, where other residents are likely to support you and where the shopkeeper's social status is similar to your own.

In his 2001 book Stupid White Men, filmmaker and social critic Michael Moore advised black readers to shop via online stores and catalogues only, and said if they needed to shop in-person they should do it nude, otherwise they're "just asking to be arrested". In his TV show Father Figure, the actor and comedian Roy Wood Jr. explained about the habit among many black people when shopping of always, irrespective of the size of the purchase, asking for a bag and requesting that the receipt be stapled to the bag, so that security personnel can clearly see the purchase when leaving the store, and thus not suspect them of shoplifting.

== Celebrity instances ==
In 1992, R&B singer-songwriter R. Kelly told Jet magazine that when he appeared at a Chicago shopping mall to sign autographs, "the security guards took one look at the way I was dressed and the fact that I am a young Black man and thought I was a shoplifter."

In 2001, Oprah Winfrey told Good Housekeeping magazine about how she and a black companion were turned away from a store while white people were being allowed in, allegedly because she and her friend reminded the clerks of black transsexuals who had earlier tried to rob it. And in 2005, Winfrey was refused service at the Parisian luxury store Hermès as the store closed for the evening, in what her spokesperson described as "Oprah's Crash moment", a reference to the 2004 movie about racial and social tensions in Los Angeles.

In 2013, a shop assistant in Zurich allegedly refused to show Winfrey a $38,000 crocodile skin Tom Ford handbag, allegedly saying it "cost too much, and you will not be able to afford [it]." However, the Trois Pommes boutique sales assistant responded that Oprah Winfrey lied about what happened in the luxury Swiss boutique where she works, specifically denying claim that she had told Winfrey could not afford the crocodile leather bag, and stating that she had asked her if she wanted to see the bag, but that Winfrey had not replied.

In the 2007 biography Condoleezza Rice: An American Life, author Elisabeth Bumiller describes two "shopping while black" type incidents: one when Rice was six and a department store clerk tried to keep her mother from using a whites-only fitting room, and another when Rice as an adult was shown cheap jewellery by a Palo Alto clerk, rather than the "better earrings" she had asked for.

In Canada, speaking out in 2016 in response to a recent case of racial profiling in a retail setting, former Lieutenant Governor of Nova Scotia Mayann Francis, the first African Nova Scotian to serve as the province's chief executive and representative of the Queen, stated that she was the target of racial profiling while shopping at least once a month.

== See also ==
- "... while black"
  - Biking while black
  - Traveling While Black
  - Driving while black
  - Dying While Black
  - Running while black
  - Shopping while black
  - While Black with MK Asante
- The talk (racism in the United States)
  - Voting while black
  - Learning while black
  - Eating while black
