= Illinois v. Wardlow =

- Supreme Court of the United States

Argued November 2, 1999 Decided January 12, 2000
- Full case name: Illinois, Petitioner v. William aka Sam Wardlow
- Citations: 528 U.S. 119 (more) 120 S. Ct. 673; 145 L. Ed. 2d 570; 2000 U.S. LEXIS 504

Case history
- Prior: 183 Ill. 2d 306, 701 N.E.2d 484 (1998)

Holding
- The police had reasonable suspicion to justify the stop because nervous, evasive behavior, like fleeing a high crime area upon noticing police officers, is a pertinent factor in determining reasonable suspicion to justify a stop

Court membership
- Chief Justice William Rehnquist Associate Justices John P. Stevens · Sandra Day O'Connor; Antonin Scalia · Anthony Kennedy; David Souter · Clarence Thomas; Ruth Bader Ginsburg · Stephen Breyer

Case opinions
- Majority: Rehnquist, joined by O'Connor, Scalia, Kennedy, Thomas
- Concur/dissent: Stevens, joined by Souter, Ginsburg, Breyer

Laws applied
- U.S. Const. amend. IV

Illinois v. Wardlow, 528 U.S. 119 (2000), is a case decided before the United States Supreme Court involving U.S. criminal procedure regarding searches and seizures.

== Background ==
On September 9, 1995, Officers Nolan and Harvey were working as uniformed officers in the special operations section of the Chicago Police Department. The officers were driving the last car of a four car caravan converging on an area known for heavy narcotics trafficking in order to investigate drug transactions. The officers were traveling together because they expected to find a crowd of people in the area, including lookouts and customers.

As the caravan passed 4035 West Van Buren, Officer Nolan observed respondent Wardlow standing next to the building holding an opaque bag. Respondent looked in the direction of the officers and fled. Nolan and Harvey turned their car southbound, watched him as he ran through the gangway and an alley, and eventually cornered him on the street. Nolan then exited his car and stopped respondent. He immediately conducted a protective pat-down search for weapons because in his experience it was common for there to be weapons in the near vicinity of narcotics transactions. During the frisk, Officer Nolan squeezed the bag respondent was carrying and felt a heavy, hard object similar to the shape of a gun. The officer then opened the bag and discovered a .38-caliber handgun with five live rounds of ammunition. The officers arrested Wardlow.

The Illinois trial court denied respondent’s motion to suppress, finding the gun was recovered during a lawful stop and frisk. App. 14. Following a stipulated bench trial, Wardlow was convicted of unlawful use of a weapon by a felon. The Illinois Appellate Court reversed Wardlow’s conviction, concluding that the gun should have been suppressed because Officer Nolan did not have reasonable suspicion sufficient to justify an investigative stop pursuant to Terry v. Ohio, 392 U.S. 1 (1968). 287 Ill. App. 3d 367, 678 N. E. 2d 65 (1997).

== Holding ==
In an opinion delivered by Chief Justice William Rehnquist, the Supreme Court held in a 5 to 4 decision that the police had reasonable suspicion to justify the stop. The police had reasonable suspicion to justify the stop because nervous, evasive behavior, like fleeing a high crime area upon noticing police officers, is a pertinent factor in determining reasonable suspicion to justify a stop.

== Dissent ==
Justice John Paul Stevens argued in dissent that the government did not articulate enough facts to establish reasonable suspicion and that there were not enough facts in the record to corroborate the government's claim.

== Impact ==
The case has been described by civil libertarians as creating a new criminal offense of "running while black."

== See also ==
- List of United States Supreme Court cases, volume 528
- List of United States Supreme Court cases
- Lists of United States Supreme Court cases by volume
- Terry v. Ohio, 392 U.S. 1 (1968)
