= Bill Plante =

American journalist (1938–2022)

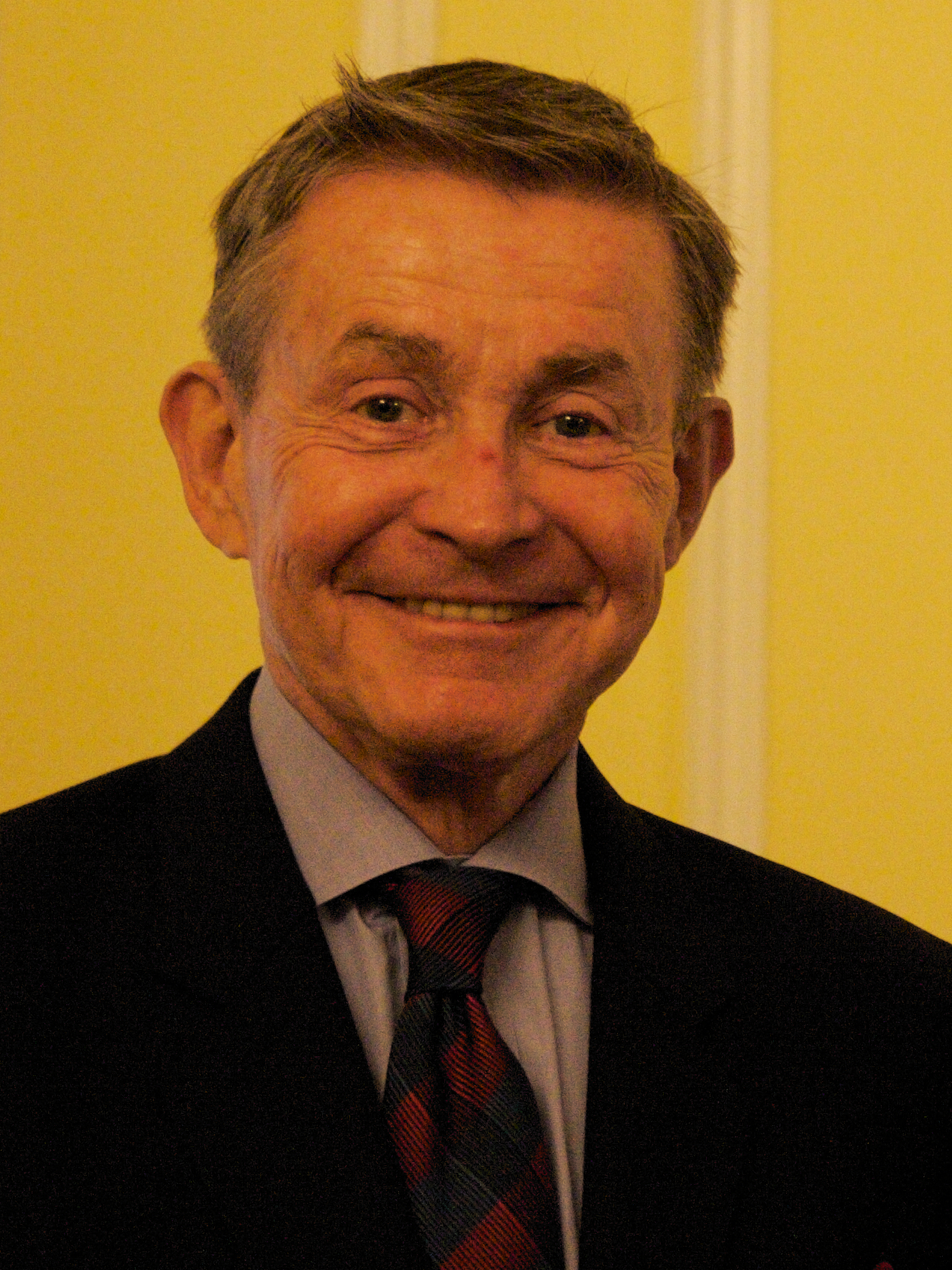
- Plante in 2011
- Born: William Madden Plante; January 14, 1938; Chicago, Illinois, U.S.
- Died: September 28, 2022 (aged 84); Washington, D.C., U.S.
- Education: Loyola University Chicago (BA); Columbia University
- Occupation: Journalist
- Employer: CBS News
- Known for: Senior White House correspondent
- Spouses: Barbara Barnes Orteig (divorced); Robin Smith (m. 1987)
- Children: 6, including Chris

William Madden Plante (January 14, 1938 – September 28, 2022) was an American journalist and correspondent for CBS News. He joined the network in 1964. Plante was noted for being the network's senior White House correspondent for over three decades.

Plante was posthumously awarded the Dunnigan-Payne Prize for lifetime career achievement on Saturday, April 29, 2023, at the White House Correspondents’ Dinner.

== Early life and education ==
Plante was born in Chicago on January 14, 1938. His father, Regis, was employed as a field engineer for a heating company; his mother, Jane (Madden), worked as a school administrator. Plante attended Loyola Academy in his hometown, graduating in 1955. It was around this time he was employed by a classical music radio station in Evanston, Illinois, his first experience with broadcasting.

Plante studied business and humanities at Loyola University Chicago, earning a bachelor's degree in 1959. He dropped out of Chicago-Kent College of Law after a friend got him a job as assistant news director at WISN-TV. He was at the station for four years before being awarded a journalism fellowship by CBS to study political science at Columbia University.

== Career ==
After completing his studies at Columbia, Plante started working for CBS News in June 1964 as a reporter and assignment editor. He was sent to South Vietnam later that year to report on the Vietnam War, the first of four tours as a correspondent. His final tour in 1975 saw him cover the fall of Phnom Penh and fall of Saigon, which earned his CBS News team the "Best Radio Spot News Reporting from Abroad" award from the Overseas Press Club.

In March 1965, Plante went to Selma, Alabama and was there when state troopers assaulted marchers on the Edmund Pettus Bridge in what was later dubbed "Bloody Sunday". He returned later that month to report on the Selma to Montgomery marches and interviewed Martin Luther King Jr. during the event.

Plante was promoted to correspondent the following year and was posted to the network's Chicago bureau. He was there for ten years and reported on the 1966 riots in the city, protests at Ohio University, the strike by the United Auto Workers in 1970, and Jimmy Hoffa's disappearance five years later. During this time, he also covered events overseas, including the state funeral of Gamal Abdel Nasser and the Indo-Pakistani War of 1971, which earned him two more Overseas Press Club awards for spot radio news.

Plante moved to CBS' Washington bureau in December 1976. He was appointed Senior White House Correspondent for CBS ten years later and held that role for 35 years until his retirement in November 2016. He anchored CBS Sunday Night News from 1988 to 1995 and also reported for CBS This Morning and the CBS Evening News. Plante won several Emmy Awards – both outright and shared with fellow CBS News correspondents – for his coverage on the Vietnam War air theater (1972), Ronald Reagan's re-election in 1984, Reagan's summit with Mikhail Gorbachev two years later, and the funeral of Diana, Princess of Wales (1997).

Plante was noted for his extensive wine collection. Other members of the press corps considered him to be an expert on the subject and became their unofficial sommelier during his tenure as White House correspondent. He also spoke about the subject from time to time on The Early Show and CBS News Sunday Morning.

While covering Bill Clinton's visit to New Zealand, Plante bungee jumped over the Kawarau River alongside White House aides. Before jumping, he declared, "This is Bill Plante of CBS News, proving that you're never too old to do something really stupid".

Plante was known for his booming baritone voice.

== Personal life ==
Plante's first marriage was to Barbara Barnes Orteig. Together, they had two children, as well as four sons from her previous marriage whom Plante adopted, including future syndicated radio talk show host Chris Plante. They eventually divorced and he later married Robin Smith in 1987. They remained married for 34 years until his death. One of his sons, Patrick, predeceased him in 2014.

Plante died on September 28, 2022, at his home in Washington, D.C., after suffering from respiratory failure. He was 84.
