= Bellefeuille =

Bellefeuille (also spelled with the de prefix) is a French-language surname. Notable people with the name include:

- Blake Bellefeuille (born 1977), American ice hockey center
- Claude DeBellefeuille (born 1963), Canadian politician, Bloc Québécois Member of Parliament
- Joel DeBellefeuille, Canadian human rights litigant
- Marcel Bellefeuille (born c. 1966), Canadian football coach
- Normand de Bellefeuille (1949–2024), Canadian poet, writer, literary critic, and essayist
- Pete Bellefeuille (1900–1970), Canadian ice hockey player
- Pierre de Bellefeuille (1923–2015), Canadian journalist and politician, Member of the National Assembly of Quebec

== See also ==
- Bellefeuille (electoral district), a provincial electoral district in Quebec
- Bellefeuille, Quebec
