= The Bronx is Next =

1968 play by Sonia Sanchez

The Bronx is Next is a play by Sonia Sanchez, written and published in 1968. Set in an immediate future where a revolution has broken out in the slums of New York and residents set their own tenements on fire, the play presents a "portrait of Black people who must face certain truths about themselves in terms of their relationships to each other, to the revolution, and to ‘the others’."

== Characters ==
- Charles – the leader of the revolutionaries
- Old Sister – an old woman who lives in the apartment buildings in Harlem
- Larry – a revolutionary
- Roland - a revolutionary
- Jimmy – a revolutionary
- White Cop – a white cop
- Black Bitch – his mistress

== Plot ==
The play begins at night in a dingy Harlem street where all the residents are bringing their most important belongings out to the curb. They are directed by Charles and his cohorts Jimmy and Roland. They are trying to clear the block before 10pm in order to burn the buildings. An old woman is trying to bring too many things out of her apartment, so Charles sends her back inside with the promise that she can come with them next time. As they prepare, another man, Larry, runs up to tell Charles that they have found a white cop inside one of the apartment buildings—even though the police force has supposedly been bribed away. The cop admits that he was visiting his black mistress in the apartment building, and demands to know what is going on. While Larry goes to bring the woman before them, the others force the white cop to do a role-play with them because of his callous attitude toward living conditions in the ghetto. Charles, Roland, and Jimmy pretend that they are white cops and he is a black man who has just been stopped for "running while black". Finally a woman in a red wig, known only as “Black Bitch”, is dragged in front of them already roughed up. Charles and Roland verbally humiliate her for sleeping with a white man, but when she is impervious to their words and claims she is done with black men who don’t respect her and only think about revolution, Charles forces her to kiss him. She hits him and he knocks her to the ground. While Jimmy helps her up to get things from her apartment, Charles tries to make the white cop come with him to apologize to her. The cop just wants to forget everything that’s happened and go home. When he tries to run, they knock him out and leave him there as the buildings are set on fire.

== Performances ==
The Bronx is Next was performed by Theater Black in October 1970 at the University of the Streets. It was presented as part of a trilogy of new plays by black playwrights; the other plays were Knock, Knock – Who Dat? by Richard Wesley and Death List by Ed Bullins. All three plays were directed by Anadoula.

== Political message ==
The Bronx is Next reflects Sonia Sanchez’s belief that urban cities wiped out generations of Black people. She felt that there was a need for blacks to leave the urban centers and leave "that which is killing them and wiping them out". The literal burning of the decaying buildings in the play is a symbol of people “destroying that which was destroying them."

== Sources ==
- Sonia Sanchez, "The Bronx is Next (1968)", in Annemarie Bean (ed.), A Sourcebook of African-American Performance: Plays, People Movements, Routledge, 1999, pp. 46–54.
