= Dry run (terrorism) =

Practice run for a terrorist attack

A dry run or a test run is an act committed by a terrorist organization or individual without carrying out any actual terrorism in an attempt to determine whether a technique they are planning to use will be successful. The dry run is part of the rehearsal for a terrorist act, and is often the immediate precursor to the attack.

The dry run is considered to be the heart of the planning stages of the terrorist attack. It is the method by which strengths and weaknesses in the plot are exposed to the terrorists, unforeseen obstacles can be detected, and the techniques are refined. Sometimes, multiple dry runs are conducted in an effort to perfect the ultimate attack.

== Suspicious signs ==
The following are suspicious signs a dry run may be occurring:

- Appearing out-of-place
- Sitting in a vehicle and observing operations for no apparent reason
- Photography or videotaping with no obvious reason or illegally
- Passing fake mock-up objects through security screening, (e.g. an Airsoft gun in place of a real firearm) to witness the reactions and protocols of security personnel. If discovered the mock-up can be passed off as an “accident”
- Monitoring of a police radio frequency and observing response times to calls, as well as observing habits and placement of security/law enforcement personnel assigned to a terrorist’s intended target
- Mapping out routes to determine timing of traffic flow and lights; sometimes to determine an escape route as well
- Attempting to learn inside information about the operations of a place, including schedules, structures, security procedures and any overall “weakness” to exploit within
- Abandoning object(s), such as pieces of luggage, backpacks, bottles (often to be retrieved later)

== Notable reports of dry runs ==
- Prior to the 1995 Oklahoma City bombing of the Alfred P. Murrah building, Timothy McVeigh and Terry Nichols had scouted out and visited several federal buildings nationwide to analyze their structures, security and U.S. federal government offices located within. The Simmons Tower was one such possibility.
- In 2004 a group of Syrian musicians boarded Northwest Airlines Flight 327. Some passengers were alarmed by the men, including Annie Jacobsen who brought the flight to national attention. She described the group of men's behavior as consistent with a dry run. Investigating authorities including the FBI concluded there was no terrorist threat.
- In 2006, British authorities uncovered a plot in which suspected terrorists were making a dry run in an attempt to make bombs out of peroxide that could be ignited with an electronic device. This led to restrictions internationally on carrying liquids on aircraft.
- A few days before the attempted 2010 Times Square car bombing, perpetrator Faisal Shahzad had driven the vehicle to be used in the bombing to New York City to rehearse the act and determine the ideal parking spot to leave the Nissan Pathfinder car bomb.
- Investigators believe that the Yemen branch of al-Qaeda may have been conducting a dry run with shipments they made in 2010 on cargo aircraft in preparation for the 2010 transatlantic aircraft bomb plot.
