= Flying imams incident =

Incident where imams were removed from a flight

On November 20, 2006, 6:30 pm, six Muslim imams were removed from US Airways Flight 300 to Phoenix, Arizona, at Minneapolis-Saint Paul International Airport, because several passengers and crew members became alarmed by what they felt was suspicious behavior. The airline has stated that the captain delayed takeoff and called airport security workers to ask the imams to leave the plane; the men refused, and that the captain then called police. The plane left without the imams on board about three hours later. The imams were arrested, questioned, and then released.

On July 24, 2009, U.S. District Judge Ann Montgomery allowed a discrimination lawsuit filed by the imams to proceed, saying, "The right not to be arrested in the absence of probable cause is clearly established and, based on the allegations ... no reasonable officer could have believed that the arrest of the Plaintiffs was proper."

== Identities ==
The six imams were: Didmar Faja, Mohamed Said Mitwaly Ibrahim, Marwan Sadeddin, Omar Shahin, Ahmad al-Shqeirat (also known as Ahmad Tafish Shqeirat), and Mahmoud Sulaiman. Ibrahim lives and works in Bakersfield, California, and the other five live and work in the Phoenix, Arizona area.

== Alleged suspicious behavior ==
According to some passengers and flight staff, the actions of the imams included praying before the flight and allegedly traveling without any checked baggage on one-way tickets.

Shahin denied allegations of suspicious behavior; said everyone in the group had round-trip tickets (and that he has the documentation to prove it); that he asked for a seatbelt extension because he weighs 290 pounds (130 kg); and that the group conducted their sunset-time prayers in a quiet manner.

== Aftermath ==
The day following the incident, Shahin, the spokesperson for the group, spoke to the press that had gathered when he returned to a US Airways ticket counter to buy new tickets for the group. He told media that the incident was "humiliating, the worst moment of my life," and asked, "To practice your faith and pray is a crime in America?" When US Airways would not issue him and the other imams new tickets he called for a boycott of the airline, and said, "I'm not going to stay silent... I came to this country to enjoy justice and freedom". He has said it is incorrect that any of the men had one-way tickets, and that he had alerted the Federal Bureau of Investigation to the conference in order to prevent this kind of incident from occurring.

Another protest, organized by the Muslim American Society Freedom Foundation, took place on December 1, 2006, in front of US Airways headquarters. The spokesman for the group said: "We want to tell US Airways that second-class citizenship is not an option." Other speakers at the gathering included a Jewish leader, a Catholic cleric, and a Presbyterian pastor who told the crowd that the "Imams did nothing to merit their exclusion from the flight". A spokesman for the Muslim American Society said that several of the affected imams did not attend the gathering because they are shy about publicity, and had been humiliated.

One of the imams, al-Shqeirat, spiritual leader of the Islamic Community Center of Tempe, said in an interview that the imams were likely to file a discrimination lawsuit against US Airways, saying that "it was handled in an unprofessional way, and the decision (to remove them from the plane) was made by unprofessional people."

Muslim Congressman-elect Keith Ellison, who gave a talk on "Imams and Politics" at the meeting from which the flying imams were returning home, attempted to organize a meeting between US Airways executives, the Metropolitan Airports Commission, and other legislators and community members to discuss the incident.

Investigations by the airline, the Air Carrier Security Committee of the Air Line Pilots Association, and the Department of Homeland Security supported the actions of the airline and found no evidence that the men were removed from the airline due to religious discrimination because they were "merely praying," but rather for security reasons. A US Airways spokesperson said,

We've done what we typically do in a situation where there is a removal or some kind of customer service at issue.... We talked with crew members and passengers and those on the ground.... We found out the facts are substantially the same, and the imams were detained because of the concerns crew members had based on the behavior they observed, and from reports by the customers.... We're looking at it as a security issue and as a customer-service issue and where we might need to do outreach.

Nihad Awad, executive director of CAIR, sent a letter to the airline seeking a settlement agreement and said, "otherwise, the group is prepared to go to court." Awad told CNN, "This is very important. Otherwise we have no guarantees such incidents with US Airways and other airlines would not happen again." No information about the amount of damages sought was given.

On October 20, 2009, the "flying imams" and the air carrier settled out of court for an unknown amount.

=== Lawsuit ===
On March 12, 2007, the imams' lawyer, Omar Mohammedi, filed a lawsuit on their behalf for unspecified damages, citing "fear, depression, mental pain and financial injury" on the part of the imams.

As a result of the lawsuit, on March 22, 2007, U.S. Representative Steve Pearce introduced the "Protecting Americans Fighting Terrorism Act of 2007" into the United States Congress, a bill that would have outlawed the suing of airline passengers who report on suspicious activity. On March 27, the bill was scrapped, and the wording instead placed into the Rail and Public Transportation Security Act of 2007, through an amendment sponsored by Representative Peter T. King. The Associated Press reported that in late July 2007 "lawmakers in Congress reached a deal on a homeland security bill to include language, crafted in response to the imams case, that would give immunity from lawsuits to people who report suspicious behavior. The bill passed the House and Senate."

On August 1, 2007, the imams' attorney Frederick Goetz announced a motion to amend the complaint to include the names of the individuals responsible for the imams' removal had been entered. The list of names included employees of the airline and police officers, but not passengers. Goetz said "We've identified the people we think are responsible", and said that their amending the complaint had "absolutely nothing to do" with the bill in Congress.

In October 2009, the imams reached a tentative settlement of their lawsuit, permitting the finalizing of details and federal judge approval; the amount was undisclosed.

== Criticism of US Airways ==
The group had initially attracted attention by praying loudly in the departure lounge before boarding the plane. Spokespersons for Muslim advocacy organizations the Muslim American Society and CAIR argued that rather than doing anything suspicious, all the men did was pray, and that the removal from the plane represented religious profiling. CAIR's Arizona chapter spokesperson said that "All these men did was pray, and it was misunderstood. The bottom line is that they were Middle Eastern-looking men ... and that scares some people," and, "We are concerned that crewmembers, passengers and security personnel may have succumbed to fear and prejudice based on stereotyping of Muslims and Islam."

== Media treatments ==
This controversy was the subject of a segment of talk show host Jerry Klein's radio show. During the show Mr. Klein purposely pretended to support forcing American Muslims to wear "identifying markers" such as armbands or tattoos (as Nazi Germany did to Jews before and during World War II) to provoke listener reactions (see Jerry Klein's 2006 radio experiment).

== See also ==
- Flying while Muslim
- Islamophobia in the United States
- Northwest Airlines Flight 327
