= Phrasal template =

Aspect of grammar

A phrasal template is a phrase-long collocation that contains one or several empty slots which may be filled by words to produce individual phrases.

== Description ==
A phrasal template is a phrase-long collocation that contains one or several empty slots which may be filled by words to produce individual phrases. Often there are some restrictions on the grammatic category of the words allowed to fill particular slots. Phrasal templates are akin to forms, in which blanks are to be filled with appropriate data. The term phrasal template first appeared in a linguistic study of prosody in 1983 but doesn't appear to have come into common use until the late 1990s. An example is the phrase "common stocks rose <Number> to <Number>", e.g., "common stocks rose 1.72 to 340.36".

"Snowclone" was coined in 2004 to describe phrasal templates that "clone" popular clichés. For example, a misquotation of Diana Vreeland's "Pink is the navy blue of India" may have given rise to the template "<color> is the new black", which in turn evolved into "<X> is the new <Y>".

== Use ==
- The word game Mad Libs makes use of phrasal templates.
- The notion is used in natural language processing systems and in natural language generation, such as in application-oriented report generators.

== See also ==
- Computational humor – usage of phrasal templates for generation of jokes by computer
- Joke cycle
- Phrase structure rules
- Phraseme
- Snowclone
- The king is dead, long live the king!
