= Jerry Klein's 2006 radio experiment =

On November 26, 2006, radio host Jerry Klein of WMAL 630 AM (covering Washington DC, Northern Virginia and Maryland) aired a program that was "focused on public reaction to the removal of six imams, or Islamic religious leaders, from a US Airways flight." (See Flying Imams controversy) In an effort to gauge his audience's reaction, he said that force should be applied to ensure that all Muslims in America wear "identifying markers. ...I'm thinking either it should be an arm band, a crescent moon arm band, or it should be a crescent moon tattoo. ...If it means that we have to round them up and do a tattoo in a place where everybody knows where to find it, then that's what we'll have to do."

The response was overwhelming and "the phone lines jammed instantly". Klein later stated that "The switchboard went from empty to totally jammed within minutes. There were plenty of callers angry with me, but there were plenty who agreed." Out of four callers Klein spoke to on air, two objected to his statements, while the other two insisted that he did not go far enough, calling for forced mass exile and internment camps, drawing comparison with the World War II-era Japanese and German camps.

At the end of the program, Klein revealed that his remarks had been a hoax, saying, "I can't believe any of you, any of you, are sick enough to have agreed for one second with anything that I have said in the last half hour, and you have, which tells me more about the state of this country, which tells me more about the state of what's going on in the heads of some of you who are listening to this program than anything else I could've done. For me to come on the air and to suggest that it's time to tattoo marks on people's bodies, have them wear armbands, put a crescent moon on their driver's license or their passport or birth certificate and to have you take me seriously is disgusting. It's beyond disgusting ... because basically what you just did was show me how the German people allowed what happened to the Jews to happen: they're the enemy, they're the dangerous ones, they're the bad guys. We need to separate them, we need to tattoo their arms, we need to make them wear yellow Stars of David on their clothing, we need to put them in concentration camps, we basically just need to kill them all because they're all dangerous." A week later, Klein also expressed surprise at how much international media coverage the story got. "You should know that I've received email from around the world, interview requests from the BBC and Channel 4 in England".

A Gallup poll the preceding summer had found that 39% of Americans were in favor of requiring Muslims, including those who were citizens, to bear special identification identifying them as such.

== See also ==
- Islamophobia
- Incitement to violence
- Internment of Japanese Americans
- Internment of German Americans
