= Sonia Sanchez =

American poet, playwright and activist (born 1934)

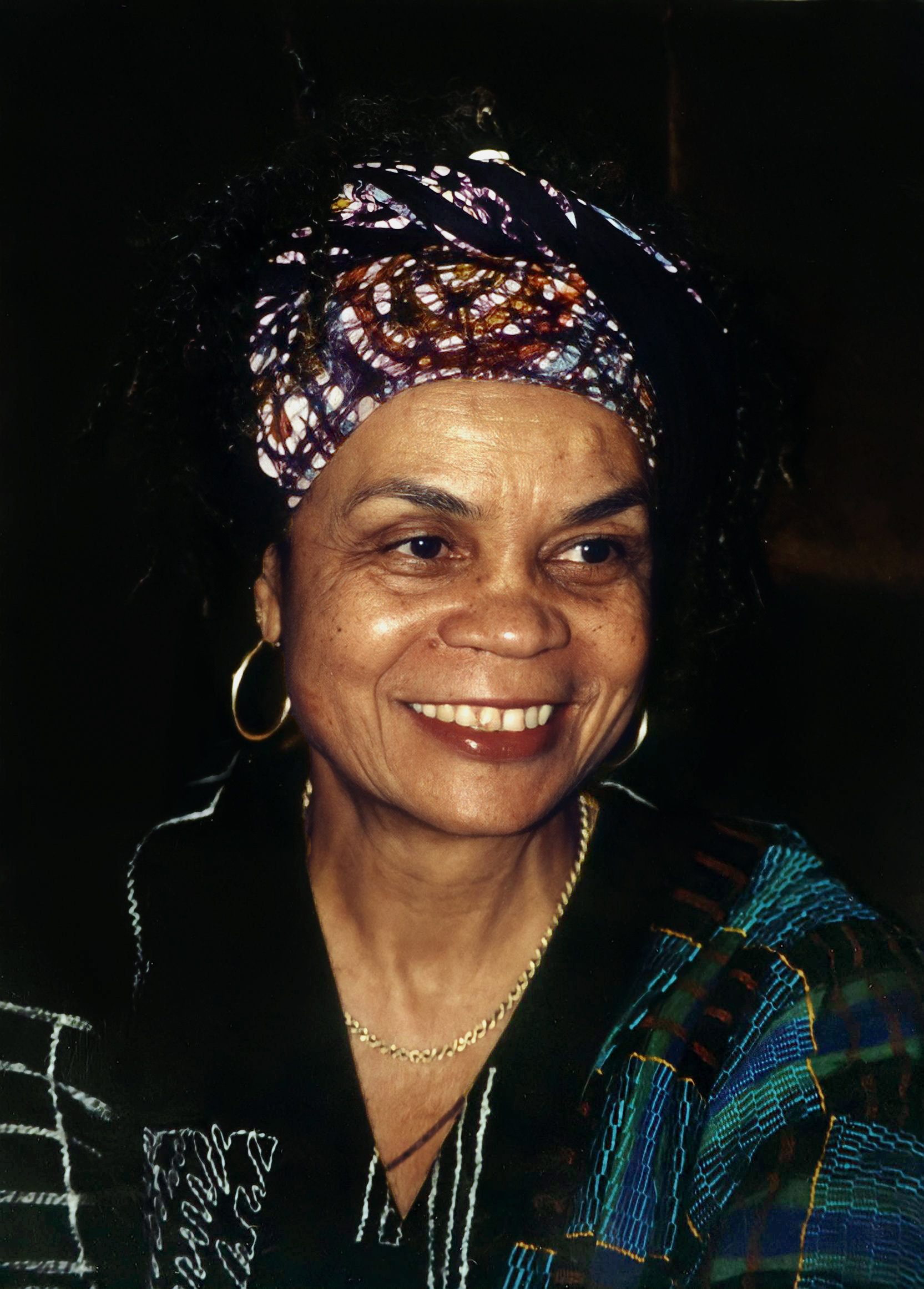
- Sanchez in 1998
- Born: Wilsonia Benita Driver; September 9, 1934 (age 92); Birmingham, Alabama, U.S.
- Education: Hunter College (BA); New York University
- Occupations: Poet; educator; columnist; dramatist; essayist
- Spouse(s): Albert Sanchez (divorced) Etheridge Knight (divorced)
- Children: 3
- Writing career
- Notable awards: Robert Frost Medal (2001); Wallace Stevens Award (2018)
- Website: soniasanchez.net

Sonia Sanchez (born Wilsonia Benita Driver; September 9, 1934) is an American poet, writer, and professor. She was a leading figure in the Black Arts Movement and has written books of poetry, short stories, critical essays, plays, and children's books. In the 1960s, Sanchez released poems in periodicals targeted towards African-American audiences, and published her debut collection, Homecoming, in 1969. In 1993, she received a Pew Fellowship in the Arts, and in 2001 was awarded the Frost Medal for her contributions to the canon of American poetry. She has been influential to other African-American poets, including Krista Franklin. Sanchez is a member of the Wintergreen Women Writers Collective.

== Early life ==
Sanchez was born in Birmingham, Alabama, United States, on September 9, 1934, to Wilson L. Driver and Lena Jones Driver. Her mother died when Sanchez was only one year old, so she spent several years being shuttled back and forth among relatives. One of those was her grandmother, who died when Sanchez was six years old. The death of her grandmother was a difficult time in her life, and Sanchez developed a stutter, which contributed to her becoming introverted. However, her stutter caused her to read more and pay close attention to language and sounds.

In 1943, Sanchez moved to Harlem in New York City to live with her father (a schoolteacher), her sister, and her stepmother, who was her father's third wife. When in Harlem, she learned to manage her stutter and excelled in school, finding her poetic voice, which later emerged during her studies at Hunter College. Sanchez focused on the sound of her poetry, always reading it aloud, and received praise for her use of the full range of African and African-American vocal resources. She is known for her sonic range and dynamic public readings. She terms herself an "ordained stutterer". Sanchez earned a BA degree in political science in 1955 from Hunter College.

Sanchez pursued post-graduate studies at New York University (NYU), working closely with Louise Bogan. During her time at NYU, she formed a writers' workshop in Greenwich Village, where the "Broadside Quartet" was born. The "Broadside Quartet" included other prominent Black Arts Movement artists such as Haki Madhubuti, Nikki Giovanni, and Etheridge Knight. These young poets were introduced and promoted by Dudley Randall, an established poet and publisher.

Although her first marriage to Albert Sanchez did not last, Sonia Sanchez retained her professional name. She and Albert had one daughter named Anita. She later married Etheridge Knight, and had twin sons named Morani Neusi and Mungu Neusi, but they divorced after two years. Motherhood heavily influenced the motifs of her poetry in the 1970s, with the bonds between mother and child emerging as a key theme. She also has three grandchildren.

== Teaching and activism ==
=== Teaching ===
Sanchez taught 5th grade in New York at the Downtown Community School, until 1967. She has taught as a professor at eight universities and has lectured at more than 500 college campuses across the US, including Howard University. She was also a leader in the effort to establish the discipline of Black studies at the university level. In 1966, while teaching at San Francisco State University, she introduced Black studies courses. Sanchez was the first to create and teach a course based on Black women and literature in the United States and the course she offered on African-American literature is generally considered the first of its kind, as it was taught at a predominantly white university. She viewed the discipline of Black studies as both a new platform for the study of race and a challenge to the institutional biases of American universities. These efforts are in line with the goals of the Black Arts Movement, and she was a known Black feminist. Sanchez was the first Presidential Fellow at Temple University, where she began working in 1977. There, she held a Laura Carnell Professorship until her retirement in 1999; she is now professor emeritus. She has read her poetry in Africa, the Caribbean, China, Australia, Europe, Nicaragua, and Canada.

=== Activism ===
Sanchez supported the National Black United Front and was an influential part of the civil rights movement and the Black Arts Movement. In the early 1960s, Sanchez became a member of the Congress of Racial Equality, where she met Malcolm X. Though she was originally an integrationist in her thinking, after hearing Malcolm X speak Sanchez became more separatist in her thinking and focused more on her Black heritage and identity.

In 1972, Sanchez joined the Nation of Islam, during which time she published A Blues Book for Blue Black Magical Women (1974), but she left the organization after three years, in 1975, because her views on women's rights conflicted with the Nation's. She continues to advocate for the rights of oppressed women and minority groups. She wrote many plays and books that have to do with the struggles and lives of Black America. Among her plays are Sister Son/ji, which was first produced off-Broadway at the New York Shakespeare Festival Public Theater in 1972; Uh, Huh: But How Do it Free us?, staged in Chicago at the Northwestern University Theatre in 1975; and Malcolm Man/Don't Live Here No Mo’, first produced in 1979 at the ASCOM Community Center in Philadelphia.

Sanchez has edited two anthologies of Black literature: We Be Word Sorcerers: 25 Stories by Black Americans (1974) and 360° of Blackness Coming at You (1999). She is also committed to a variety of activist causes, including the Brandywine Peace Community, MADRE, and Plowshares.

=== Black Arts Movement ===
The aim of the Black Arts Movement was a renewal of Black will, insight, energy, and awareness. Sanchez published poetry and essays in numerous periodicals in the 1960s, including The Liberator, Negro Digest, and Black Dialogue. Her writing established her importance to the "black aesthetic" program as a political thinker. Sanchez gained a reputation as an important voice in the Black Arts Movement after publishing the book of poems Homecoming in 1969. This collection and her second in 1970, titled We a BaddDDD People, used experimental poetic forms to discuss the development of Black nationalism and identity.

== Writing style and themes ==
Sanchez is known for her melding of musical formats—such as the blues—and traditional poetic formats such as haiku and tanka. She also uses spelling to celebrate the sound of Black English, for which she gives credit to poets such as Langston Hughes and Sterling Allen Brown.

Her first collection of poems, Homecoming (1969), is known for its blues influences in both form and content. The collection describes both the struggle of defining Black identity in the United States as well as the causes for celebration Sanchez sees in Black culture. Her second book, We a BaddDDD People (1970), solidifies her contribution to the Black Arts Movement aesthetic by focusing on the everyday lives of Black people. These poems make use of urban Black vernacular; experimental punctuation, spelling, and spacing; and the performative quality of jazz.

Though still emphasizing what she sees as the need for revolutionary cultural change, Sanchez's later works, such as I've Been a Woman (1978), Homegirls and Handgrenades (1985), and Under a Soprano Sky (1987), focus more on themes of love, community, and empowerment. She continues to explores the haiku and tanka forms, as well as blues-influenced rhythms. Later works continue her experiments with forms such as the epic in Does Your House Have Lions? (1997), an account of her brother's struggle with AIDS, and the haiku in Morning Haiku (2010).

In addition to her poetry, Sanchez's contributions to the Black Arts Movement included drama and prose. She began writing plays while in San Francisco in the 1960s. Several of her plays challenge the masculinist spirit of the movement, focusing on strong female protagonists. Sanchez has been recognized as a pioneering champion of Black feminism.

== Contemporary works ==
Her more recent contemporary endeavors include a spoken-word interlude on "Hope is an Open Window", a song co-written by Diana Ross from her 1998 album Every Day Is a New Day. Sanchez was among 20 African-American women to be a part of Freedom's Sisters, a mobile exhibition initiated by the Cincinnati Museum Center and the Smithsonian Institution.

Sanchez became the first Poet Laureate of Philadelphia after being appointed by Mayor Michael Nutter. She served in that position from 2012 to 2014.

In 2013, Sanchez headlined the 17th annual Poetry Ink, at which she read her poem "Under a Soprano Sky".

BaddDDD Sonia Sanchez, a documentary film by Barbara Attie, Janet Goldwater, and Sabrina Schmidt Gordon spotlighting Sanchez's work, influence, and life, premiered in 2015 at the Full Frame Documentary Film Festival. The film was released publicly on June 22, 2016.

== Awards ==
In 1969, Sanchez was awarded the PEN Writing Award. She was awarded the National Education Association Award in 1977. She also won a National Endowment for the Arts Fellowship in 1977. In 1985, she received an American Book Award for Homegirls and Handgrenades. She has also been awarded the Community Service Award from the National Black Caucus of State Legislators, the Pennsylvania Governor's Award for Excellence in the Humanities, and the Peace and Freedom Award from the Women's International League for Peace and Freedom, as well as the 1999 Langston Hughes Medal, the 2001 Frost Medal, and the 2004 Harper Lee Award.

In 2009, she received the Robert Creeley Award from the Robert Creeley Foundation. In 2017, Sanchez was honored at the 16th Annual Dr. Betty Shabazz Awards in a ceremony held on June 29 at the Schomburg Center for Research in Black Culture.

In 2018, she won the Wallace Stevens Award from the Academy of American Poets.

At the 84th Annual Anisfield-Wolf Book Awards ceremony on September 26, 2019, Sanchez was honored with the Lifetime Achievement Award by the Cleveland Foundation.

In October 2021, Sanchez was awarded the 28th annual Dorothy and Lillian Gish Prize "in recognition of her ongoing achievements in inspiring change through the power of the word."

In 2022, Sanchez was awarded the Edward MacDowell Medal for outstanding contributions to American culture.

== Selected publications ==
=== Poetry ===
- Home Coming, Broadside Press, 1969
- We a BaddDDD People, Broadside Press, 1970, ISBN 978-0-910296-27-4
- It's a New Day: Poems for Young Brothas and Sistuhs, Broadside Press, 1971, ISBN 978-0-910296-60-1
- Love Poems, Third Press, 1973, ISBN 978-0-89388-104-7
- A Blues Book for a Blue Black Magic Woman, Broadside Press, 1974, ISBN 978-0-910296-78-6
- Homegirls and Handgrenades, Thunder's Mouth Press, 1984, ISBN 978-0-938410-23-2
- I've Been a Woman: New and Selected Poems, Third World Press, 1985, ISBN 978-0-88378-112-8
- Under a Soprano Sky, Africa World Press, 1987, ISBN 978-0-86543-052-5
- Shake Down Memory: A Collection of Political Essays and Speeches, Africa World Press, 1991, ISBN 978-0865432116
- Autumn Blues: New Poems, Africa World Press, 1994, ISBN 978-0865432086
- Continuous Fire: A Collection of Poetry, 1994, ISBN 978-0865432123
- Wounded in the House of a Friend, Beacon Press, 1995, ISBN 978-0-8070-6826-7
- Does Your House Have Lions?, Beacon Press, 1997, ISBN 978-0-8070-6830-4
- Like the Singing Coming Off the Drums, Beacon Press, 1998, ISBN 9780807068434
- Shake Loose My Skin: New and Selected Poems, Beacon Press, 2000, ISBN 978-0-8070-6853-3
- Morning Haiku, Beacon Press, 2010, ISBN 978-0-8070-6910-3
- Collected Poems, Beacon Press, 2021, ISBN 978-0807026526

=== Plays ===
- Black Cats and Uneasy Landings (1995)
- I'm Black When I'm Singing, I'm Blue When I Ain't (1982)
- The Bronx is Next (1970)
- Sista Son/Ji (1972)
- Uh Huh, But How Do It Free Us? (1975)
- Malcolm Man/Don't Live Here No More (1979)
- I'm Black When I'm Singing, I'm Blue When I Ain't and Other Plays (1982)

=== Children's books ===
- The Adventures of Fat Head, Small Head, and Square Head, Third Press, 1973, ISBN 978-0-89388-094-1
- A Sound Investment: Short Stories for Young Readers, Third World Press, 1980

=== Anthologies ===
==== As editor ====
- We Be Word Sorcerers: 25 Stories by Black Americans (1974)
- 360 Degrees of Blackness Coming at You! (1999)

==== As contributor ====
- Busby, Margaret, ed. (1992). "Just Don't Never Give Up on Love". Daughters of Africa: An International Anthology of Words and Writings by Women of African Descent from the Ancient Egyptian to the Present. Pantheon Books. ISBN 978-0-679-41634-0.
- Bly, Robert; Lehman, David, eds. (1999). "Last recording session/for papa joe". The Best American Poetry, 1999. Scribner. ISBN 978-0-684-84280-6.
- Díaz, Junot, ed. (2001). "A Poem for My Father". The Beacon Best of 2001: Great Writing by Women and Men of All Colors and Cultures. Beacon Press. ISBN 978-0-8070-6239-5.
- Rampersad, Arnold; Herbold, Hilary, eds. (2006). "answer to yo / question of am i not yo / woman even if you went on shit again ; a poem for my father". The Oxford Anthology of African-American Poetry. Oxford University Press. ISBN 978-0-19-512563-4.

=== Interviews ===
- Joyce, Joyce Ann, ed. (2007). Conversations with Sonia Sanchez. University Press of Mississippi. ISBN 978-1-57806-952-1.

== Discography ==
- A Sun Lady for All Seasons Reads Her Poetry (Folkways Records, 1971)
- Every Tone a Testimony (Smithsonian Folkways, 2001)

== See also ==
- Mumia Abu-Jamal — incarcerated activist for whose trial Sanchez served as a character witness
