= Whren v. United States =

- Supreme Court of the United States

Argued April 17, 1996 Decided June 10, 1996
- Full case name: Michael A. Whren and James L. Brown, Petitioners, v. United States
- Citations: 517 U.S. 806 (more) 116 S. Ct. 1769; 135 L. Ed. 2d 89; 1996 U.S. LEXIS 3720

Case history
- Prior: Conviction affirmed, United States v. Whren, 53 F.3d 371 (D.C. Cir. 1995); cert. granted, 516 U.S. 1036 (1996).
- Subsequent: Conviction affirmed on remand, United States v. Whren, 111 F.3d 956 (D.C. Cir. 1997); cert. denied, 522 U.S. 1119 (1998).

Holding
- Any traffic offense committed by a driver is a legitimate legal basis for a traffic stop.

Court membership
- Chief Justice William Rehnquist Associate Justices John P. Stevens · Sandra Day O'Connor; Antonin Scalia · Anthony Kennedy; David Souter · Clarence Thomas; Ruth Bader Ginsburg · Stephen Breyer

Case opinion
- Majority: Scalia, joined by unanimous

Laws applied
- U.S. Const. amend. IV

Whren v. United States, 517 U.S. 806 (1996), was a unanimous United States Supreme Court decision that "declared that any traffic offense committed by a driver was a legitimate legal basis for a stop."

In an opinion authored by Antonin Scalia, the court held that a search and seizure is not a violation of the Fourth Amendment in cases where the police officers have a "reasonable suspicion" that a traffic violation has occurred. The personal, or subjective, motives of an officer are not a factor in the Court's Fourth Amendment analysis of whether the cause for a stop is sufficient. The standard for reasonable suspicion is purely an objective one.

A major concern with this case's ruling is that police conducting traffic stops may racially profile the stopped persons.

== Background ==
On June 10, 1993, Michael Whren and James L. Brown were driving around Washington D.C. in an SUV. Brown was the driver, and Whren sat in the passenger seat. They were driving in what police officers considered a "high drug area."

Meanwhile, two officers dressed in plainclothes were patrolling the area in an unmarked car. They were members of the District of Columbia's Vice Squad and were assigned to the area; they noticed a suspicious vehicle stopped at a stop sign for about 20 seconds as its two occupants looked at their lap area. At the suppression hearing, Officer Soto testified that the vehicle then turned at an "unreasonable" speed without using their turning signal whereas Officer Littlejohn made no attempt to claim that the Pathfinder was stopped because it had committed any traffic violation. The officers then began pursuing Whren and Brown and ultimately blocked them in at a red light so they couldn’t drive away.

Upon approaching the car, the officer noticed two plastic bags of crack cocaine in Whren's hands. Marijuana laced with PCP was also found in plain sight. The two were charged with possession with the intent to distribute around 50 g of crack cocaine. Also, Whren and Brown were pulled over in a school zone, which resulted in harsher federal drug violation sentences.

== Lower courts ==
Before trial, counsel for the defense moved to suppress the drug evidence by claiming that the traffic stop was only a pretext to investigate possible drug crimes, without probable cause. In other words, the officers used common traffic violations only to investigate other criminal activity to make an arrest. They tried to form the argument that this arrest was a breach of the Fourth Amendment of the United States Constitution.

The motion to suppress was denied by the United States District Court for the District of Columbia and both defendants were sentenced to 14 years. The United States Court of Appeals for the District of Columbia Circuit affirmed the previous ruling.

== Question ==
"In this case we decide whether the temporary detention of a motorist who the police have probable cause to believe has committed a civil traffic violation is inconsistent with the Fourth Amendment's prohibition against unreasonable seizures unless a reasonable officer would have been motivated to stop the car by a desire to enforce the traffic laws." In other words, did the officers breach the Fourth Amendment with an illegal search and seizure?

== Decision ==
The court came to a unanimous decision, written by Justice Scalia:

The temporary detention of a motorist upon probable cause to believe that he has violated the traffic laws does not violate the Fourth Amendment's prohibition against unreasonable seizures, even if a reasonable officer would not have stopped the motorist absent some additional law enforcement objective.

If officers have probable cause to believe that a traffic violation occurred, they are allowed to stop a vehicle. Because the petitioners sped away at an "unreasonable" speed, the officers were given reasonable cause to stop the vehicle. A traffic violation occurred and this gave the officers cause to initiate a stop. The officers did not ignore the danger of a pretextual stop but acted on a crime.

The court also rejected the petitioners claim that the government's interest in traffic safety led to anxiety, confusion, and haste for Whren and Brown. There was nothing particularly harmful about the search and seizure.

Scalia noted previous cases involving police stops. Using Delaware v. Prouse (1979) and other cases, Scalia claimed that because there was a traffic violation, the search and seizure did not violate constitutional rights: "such stops could be made regardless of an officer's true intentions."

The Court agreed that race has no place in enforcement by pointing to the Equal Protection Clause. Nonetheless, the Court held that as long as there was some probable cause of a traffic violation, no matter how minor, the officer has the right to pull over a vehicle.

=== Racial profiling ===
An issue in this case is the concern surrounding racially motivated pretextual stops. David Harris argues that pretextual traffic stops "[deepen] distrust and cynicism by African Americans about police and the entire criminal justice system."

== Subsequent developments ==
In 2016, the United States Court of Appeals for the Ninth Circuit further ruled in United States v. Hector Magallon-Lopez that police can lie about witnessing traffic offenses during a stop as long as reasonable suspicion and/or probable cause exists beforehand (similar to Frazier v. Cupp).

== See also ==
- Consent search
- Driving while black
- Fourth Amendment to the United States Constitution
- List of United States Supreme Court cases, volume 517
- List of United States Supreme Court cases by the Rehnquist Court
- Terry stop
- Rodriguez v. United States (2015)
- Virginia v. Moore (2008)
- Terry v. Ohio (1968)
