= Operation Pipeline =

Drug Enforcement Administration program

Operation Pipeline is a program of the United States Drug Enforcement Administration (DEA), that trains police officers across the country on drug interdiction methods on roads. The program began in the 1980s. The American Civil Liberties Union wrote in 1999 that the program was "instrumental" in increasing the usage of pretext stops by law enforcement, and criticized materials used in the program as "implicitly (if not explicitly) encouraged the targeting of minority motorists." Michelle Alexander, in her book The New Jim Crow, deemed the program "perhaps the best known" of a series of DEA programs created during the war on drugs that "train[] police to conduct utterly unreasonable and discriminatory stops and searches throughout the United States."

In the 1980s and 1990s, the Royal Canadian Mounted Police developed a similar program in Canada.
