= While Black with MK Asante =

- Genre: News
- Created by: Snapchat
- Starring: M. K. Asante
- Country of origin: United States
- Original language: English
- No. of seasons: 2
- No. of episodes: 18

Production
- Executive producers: Jimmy Fox, April Smith, Tim Pastore, Ta'Nai Cie, M. K. Asante
- Producers: Stephanie Valentin, Emily Bon, Ash Francis
- Production location: United States
- Running time: 4–6 minutes
- Production company: Snap

Original release
- Network: Snapchat
- Release: November 4, 2019 – present

While Black with MK Asante is a docuseries from Snapchat. The show is a Snap Original and is produced by Snapchat, NBCUniversal, Indigo Development and Entertainment Arts, and Main Event Media. It is hosted by M. K. Asante. The first episode of the series appeared on November 4, 2019.

Vibe magazine wrote that While Black with MK Asante "explores what it means to be young, gifted and black through the lens of several young men and women who are making a radical change within themselves and their communities". Black Entertainment Television wrote that "by concentrating on matters most relevant to people of color right now, the Snapchat series explores everything from criminalizing children to Black Lives Matter to the N-word".

== Concept ==
Black with MK Asante is a digital media project that highlights the experiences and perspectives of Black youth in America through short-form storytelling distributed via smartphone platforms, making these narratives accessible to a broad teenage audience.

== Reach and reception ==
The series was listed in People's list of "The Short-Form Shows We're Most Excited for in 2020".

The NBC anchor Craig Melvin discussed the series on The Today Show, remarking, "What I love about the show and what he's doing. One of my chief complaints about these things [smartphones] is that it's created an entire generation of news grazers; people who just read the headlines. But what he does in his Snapchat show is takes difficult topics to get your head around, and he digs into them, and covers all the angles."

== Awards ==
- 2020 Short Form Series (Nomination) Critics' Choice Real TV Awards
- 2020 Best in Social Activism (Finalist) - Shorty Awards
- 2021 Best use of Snapchat Discover (Finalist) - Shorty Awards

== See also ==
- Driving while black
- Dying While Black
- Shopping while black
