= Northwest Airlines Flight 327 =

2004 aviation incident

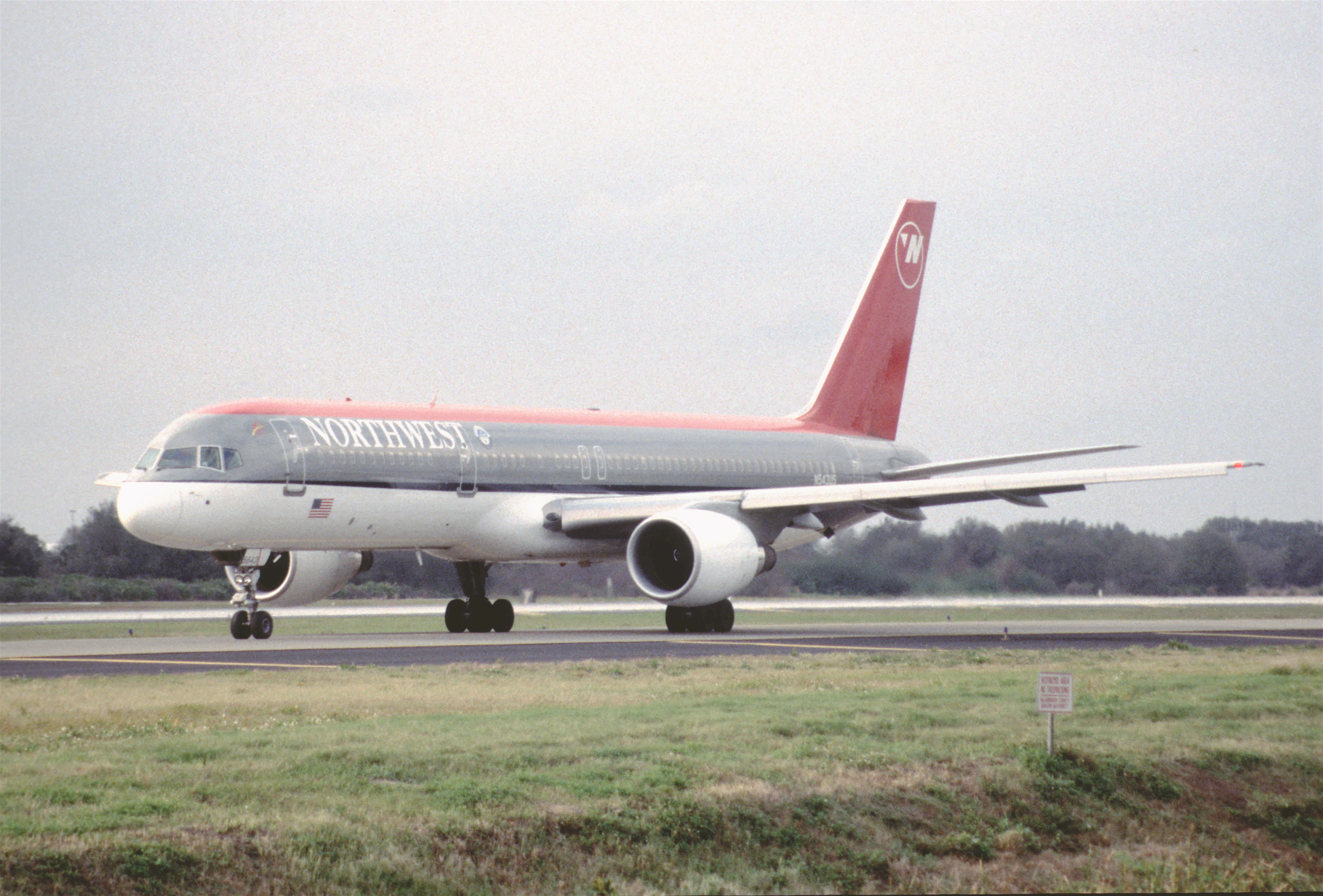
- N543US, the aircraft involved, seen here on January 27, 1998

Occurrence
- Date: June 29, 2004
- Summary: Suspected terrorist hijack Racial panic
- Site: en route

Aircraft
- Aircraft type: Boeing 757-200
- Aircraft name: N543US
- Operator: Northwest Airlines
- Registration: N543US
- Flight origin: Detroit Metropolitan Wayne County Airport, Detroit, Michigan, United States
- Destination: Los Angeles International Airport, Los Angeles, California, United States
- Passengers: unknown
- Crew: unknown
- Fatalities: 0
- Injuries: 0

Northwest Airlines Flight 327 was a June 29, 2004 flight from Detroit Metropolitan Wayne County Airport in Romulus, Michigan to Los Angeles International Airport in Los Angeles, California, on N543US, a Boeing 757-200. The behavior of a group of 13 Syrian musicians, on their way to an engagement in San Diego, was deemed suspicious by at least one passenger, who raised concerns that they were observing a terrorist attack or a dry run test. One passenger, journalist Annie Jacobsen, wrote a series of articles about the incident, bringing it to national attention. A redacted version of the Department of Homeland Security Inspector General's report was released in May 2007 as a result of a Freedom of Information Act request made by the Washington Times.

Jacobsen's original article was distributed widely through emails, and the veracity of her claims was discussed and debunked by Snopes, which determined them to be "false".

== Incident ==
Before takeoff, 14 men of Middle Eastern descent boarded the aircraft. 13 of them were Syrian nationals in the US on short-term visas, using one-way tickets which they had paid for in cash. Their visas had expired on June 10, but they had filed for extensions, which were eventually granted.

During the flight, Annie Jacobsen, a writer for WomensWallStreet, believed that the men were acting suspiciously. She claimed that one of the flight attendants had previously notified an air marshal on board the flight that she thought the men were acting suspiciously, but the air marshals later said that a flight attendant had merely passed on Jacobsen's concerns. Jacobsen and her husband became increasingly vocal when they believed that their concerns were not being taken seriously, to the point that air marshals believed that the couple might themselves be terrorists, trying to draw them out to reveal their identities.

In a series of articles for WomensWallStreet titled "Terror in the Skies, Again?," Jacobsen claimed that several other Flight 327 passengers have corroborated her story including one who was so frightened by what she witnessed that she no longer travels by air and others said they were convinced they were about to die. One such passenger confirmed the story to the Washington Times.

Debate over what happened on the flight became an Internet phenomenon, according to CNN's Aaron Brown. Jacobsen's articles were translated into many languages including Chinese, Swahili and German as it circulated around the globe.

In the WomensWallStreet articles, Jacobsen detailed the activity she took to be suspicious. She claimed that before boarding, the men did not interact or seem to be part of a group. Further, she claimed that during boarding, each man made eye contact with each of the others and nodded as if in agreement. One man, who wore an orthopedic shoe, complained loudly, just before takeoff, that he needed to switch seats. Once in flight, one of the men took a large McDonald's bag to a lavatory, exiting with the bag nearly empty, and giving the thumbs up sign as he passed two other suspicious men. Some of the other men also took objects with them to the lavatory, such as a mass of cloth, a camera, and a cell phone. Throughout the flight, the men would get up in unison, walk to the lavatories, and congregate in the aisles in groups of two and three. One of the men, wearing a suit and sunglasses, stood a foot or so away from the cockpit door. When the captain announced clearance for landing, seven of the men stood in unison and went to the lavatory, each taking about four minutes. The last man to exit the lavatory supposedly dragged his forefinger across his neck as he passed one of the other men, mouthing the word "No."

Upon arriving in Los Angeles, the 14 men that Jacobsen saw were detained for questioning and identity verification. The Federal Air Marshal Service concluded that they were Syrian band members en route to a San Diego casino to perform. Jacobsen claims, however, that only two of the men were briefly investigated and nobody has determined where the men went after leaving the airport.

== Reaction to reports ==
In a later interview to TIME magazine, the lead air marshal aboard the flight stated, "there was never a time when my main partner or I felt there was an imminent threat to that airplane or the passengers...I understand why the passenger felt some anxiety about activity on Flight 327 but that kind of activity was unusual but not a security incident. There was never a threat to the plane." The Homeland Security report produced by the Inspector General revealed that this air marshal had noticed that the Syrians' travel visas were expired but the air marshal failed to report this information to his supervisors, claiming it was out of his jurisdiction.

Furthermore, the federal air marshals believed that Jacobsen "over-reacted" at the presence of persons of Middle Eastern appearance on the flight and "was in danger of panicking other passengers and creating a larger problem". They were also concerned that Jacobsen's actions were part of a terrorist plot to create a disturbance in order that the marshals be identified and that she "could have put the entire flight in danger".

The Department of Homeland Security, Office of the Inspector General, spent twenty-two months investigating Flight 327; the report has been classified, but a redacted version reveals that the musical group's promoter, who was on the plane, had been involved in a similar incident in January 2004.

A Washington Times story claimed that some air marshals believed that Northwest Airlines Flight 327 was a "dry run" for a future terrorist attack involving commercial planes, but did not quote any air marshal making that claim, neither with attribution nor anonymously. A follow-up story revealed the Freedom of Information Act request and promised more details to come.

Gary Boettcher, president of the Coalition of Airline Pilots Associations, however, said that Jacobsen had likely witnessed a dry run, and that he had many similar experiences himself. Federal Air Marshal P. Jeffrey Black confirmed that in his opinion, Flight 327 was a terrorist probe or dry run. Mark Bogosian, an American Airlines pilot, said that incidents like the one Jacobsen described were a "dirty little secret" that airline crew members had known for some time.

Jacobsen's original article was distributed widely through emails, and the veracity of her claims was discussed and dismissed on the Snopes urban legend website, which determined them to be "false".
