= The talk (racism in the United States) =

Parenting issue in the United States

"The talk" is a colloquial expression for a conversation black parents in the United States feel compelled to have with their children and teenagers about the dangers they face due to racism or unjust treatment from authority figures, law enforcement or other parties, and how to de-escalate them. The practice dates back generations and is often viewed as a rite of passage for black children.

== History ==
Black youth in the United States have historically been instructed by their parents or other caregivers on the dangers they face due to racism. Variations of the talk have been conducted in black families for decades or generations; the practice "dates back to slavery and has lasted centuries".

The talk has evolved. In the 1940s, the talk might have covered avoiding certain neighborhoods. In the 1980s, it might have covered "how to dress, walk and act and to be mindful of how others could perceive them". In the 2010s it typically focused on interactions with the police.

Utne Reader called the talk "a rite of passage" for black children. Judy Belk, writing in the Los Angeles Times, called the talk "an unfair but necessary burden we carry in the black community, one we reluctantly pass down" and "a painful ritual."

In 2020, during and after the George Floyd protests, some black commentators called for white parents to have a similar talk with their children on how to behave when they witness racist behavior and how to be anti-racist. Later that year, during the final 2020 United States presidential debate, moderator Kristen Welker asked both candidates to express their opinions on the talk.

== Content ==
The conversation often focuses on how to de-escalate encounters with police especially given the high frequency of black men being pulled over for minor, insignificant or non-existent issues, also referred to as driving while black. Sometimes the talk addresses encounters with white supremacists or vigilantes.

The "talk" has been described as an example of preparation for bias in racial-ethnic socialization and typically addresses specific advice in dealing with interactions with law enforcement. Brooks et al. (2016) described the type of advice for those confronted by law enforcement while driving:

- Pulling over your vehicle right away
- Keeping hands visible on the steering wheel and not making sudden moves
- Not reaching for items in your wallet or glove compartment, without informing the law enforcement officer first
- Being as polite as possible, using "Yes sir, officer"
- Not arguing, even if you are right

The perception of a need for these behaviors has been described as racialized legal cynicism.

According to PBS, the talks usually include instructions such as:

If you are stopped by the police: Always answer 'yes sir, no sir'; never talk back; don’t make any sudden movements; don’t put your hands in your pockets; obey all commands; if you think you are falsely accused, save it for the police station. I would rather pick you up at the station than the morgue…"

— The Talk: Race in America

According to Vox, for Black people in the United States, "a typical police stop turning into a violent encounter is a very real, terrifying possibility."

Some Black parents focus on not only safety but also dignity and pride.

== Approaches ==
There are five common general approaches parents take:

- Focusing primarily on pride in one’s culture
- Discussing societal issues of injustice and inequality
- Focusing on the value of hard work and deemphasizing the importance of race
- Teaching messages of mistrust
- Avoidance of the discussion

Parents often combine multiple approaches. Research indicates the avoidance of discussion and teaching messages of mistrust are the least effective. Focusing on pride and societal issues is typically more effective.

== Depiction ==
The New York Times made a short documentary in 2015 featuring the experiences of Black Americans in having this conversation with their children and their memories of their own parents' conversations with them. A 2016 episode of black-ish featured three generations of a Black family watching television as a verdict in a police brutality case was announced; ABC rebroadcast it June 2, 2020, in response to the murder of George Floyd and subsequent protests. PBS created a two-hour documentary, The Talk: Race in America, in 2017. Procter & Gamble produced a commercial called "The Talk" in 2017. A 2018 episode of Grey's Anatomy included a Black couple having the talk with their son. The 2018 film The Hate U Give includes a scene where a parent gives the talk to his children.

A 2018 book for 4-to-8-year-olds, Something Happened in Our Town, recommends having the first talk prior to preschool and another when children start venturing independently into public space.

In 2019, PBS station WFYI, the SALT Project, Trinity United Church of Christ and Christian Theological Seminary partnered to develop a short video for young Black men called "Get Home Safely: 10 Rules of Survival". On August 4, 2020, British TV channel Channel 4 aired a documentary featuring the experiences of Black Britons in having this conversation with their parents. Stars who contributed included Rochelle Humes, Tinie Tempah and Leigh-Anne Pinnock.

In 2022, the educational animation video, The Black and Blue Code, was produced as a guide to dealing with police for "Black and Brown" youth, teens, and people with disabilities. The work covers the history of policing, trauma among groups, and best practices when interacting with police.

In his 2023 State of the Union Address, President Joe Biden mentioned the talk:

I've never had to have the talk with my children – Beau, Hunter, and Ashley – that so many Black and Brown families have had with their children.

If a police officer pulls you over, turn on your interior lights. Don't reach for your license. Keep your hands on the steering wheel.

== See also ==
- John Henryism
- Minority stress
- Running while black
- Shopping while black
- Stop and frisk
- Uncle Tom syndrome
