= Snowclone =

Cliché used as a pattern for other expressions

A snowclone is a phrasal template based on a cliché, substituting words to express a similar idea in a different context, often to humorous or sarcastic effect. For example, the Iraqi dictator Saddam Hussein's widely publicized phrase "the mother of all battles" in 1991 spawned such variations as "the mother of all traffic jams" or "mother of all bombs". The term snowclone was coined in 2004, derived from journalistic clichés that referred to the number of Inuit words for snow.

== History and derivation ==
The linguistic phenomenon of "a multi-use, customizable, instantly recognizable, time-worn, quoted or misquoted phrase or sentence that can be used in an entirely open array of different variants" was originally described by linguist Geoffrey K. Pullum in 2003. Pullum later described snowclones as "some-assembly-required adaptable cliché frames for lazy journalists".

In an October 2003 post on Language Log, a collaborative blog by several linguistics professors, Pullum solicited ideas for what the then-unnamed phenomenon should be called. In response to the request, the word "snowclone" was coined by economics professor Glen Whitman on January 15, 2004, and Pullum endorsed it as a term of art the next day. Whitman derived the term from journalistic clichés referring to the number of Eskimo words for snow and incorporates a pun on the snow cone.

The term "snowclone" has since been adopted by other linguists, journalists, and authors.

Snowclones are related to both memes and clichés, according to the Los Angeles Times's David Sarno: "Snowclones are memechés, if you will: meme-ified clichés with the operative words removed, leaving spaces for you or the masses to Mad Lib their own versions."

== Notable examples ==
=== Eskimo words for snow ===
Pullum, in his first discussion of what would later be called a snowclone, offered the following example of a template describing multiple variations of a journalistic cliché he had encountered: "If Eskimos have N words for snow, X surely have M words for Y." Pullum cited this as a popular rhetorical trope used by journalists to imply that cultural group X has reason to spend a great deal of time thinking about the specific idea Y, although the basic premise (that Eskimos have a larger number of words for snow) is often disputed by those who study Eskimo (Inuit and Yupik) languages.

In 2003, an article in The Economist stated, "If Eskimos have dozens of words for snow, Germans have as many for bureaucracy." A similar construction in the Edmonton Sun in 2007 claimed that "auto manufacturers have 100 words for beige".

=== In space, no one can hear you X ===
The original request from Geoffrey Pullum, in addition to citing the Eskimos-and-snow namesake of the term snowclone, mentioned a poster slogan for the 1979 film Alien, "In space, no one can hear you scream", which was cloned into numerous variations stating that in space, no one can hear you belch, bitch, blog, cream, DJ, dream, drink, etc.

=== X is the new Y ===
Frequently seen snowclones include phrases in the form of the template "X is the new Y". The original (and still common) form is the template "X is the new black", apparently based on a misquotation of Diana Vreeland's 1962 statement that pink is "the navy blue of India". According to language columnist Nathan Bierma, this snowclone provides "a tidy and catchy way of conveying an increase, or change in nature, or change in function – or all three – of X".

Examples include a 2001 album titled Quiet Is the New Loud, a 2008 newspaper headline that stated "Comedy is the new rock 'n' roll", and the title of the 2010 book and 2013 Netflix original series Orange Is the New Black.

=== The mother of all X ===
"The mother of all X", a hyperbole that has been used to refer to something as "great" or "the greatest of its kind", became a popular snowclone template in the 1990s. The phrase entered American popular culture in September 1990 at the outset of the Gulf War, when Saddam Hussein's Revolutionary Command Council warned the U.S.-led Coalition against military action in Kuwait with the statement: "Let everyone understand that this battle is going to become the mother of all battles." The phrase was repeated in a January 1991 speech by Saddam Hussein. A calque from Arabic, the snowclone gained popularity in the media and was adapted for phrases such as "the mother of all bombs" and New Zealand's "Mother of all Budgets". The American Dialect Society declared "the mother of all" the 1991 Word of the Year. The term "Father of All Bombs" was created by an analogy.

The Arabic phrase originated from an Arab victory over the Sassanian Persians in 636 CE, described with the earliest known use of the phrase "mother of all battles" (Arabic: ام المعارك, romanized: umm al-ma‘ārik). Although popularly used to mean "greatest" or "ultimate", the Arabic umm al- prefix creates a figurative phrase in which "mother" also suggests that the referent will give rise to many more of its kind. The phrase was used in the naming of a mosque in Baghdad, the Umm al-Ma'arik Mosque.

=== X-ing while Y ===
The template "X-ing while Black", and its original popular construction "driving while Black", are sardonic plays on "driving while intoxicated", and refer to Black people being pulled over by police solely because of their race. A prominent variant, "voting while Black", surfaced during the U.S. presidential elections of 2000 and 2004 in reference to attempts to suppress Black votes. Snowclones of this form, highlighting the unequal treatment of Black people, have included "walking while Black" for pedestrian offenses, "learning while Black" for students in schools, "drawing while Black" for artists, and "shopping while Black" or "eating while Black" for customers in stores and restaurants. A 2017 legal case prompted the variant "talking while Black".

The template has been applied to other groups; the term "flying while Muslim" appeared post-9/11 to describe disproportionate suspicion shown towards airline passengers perceived to be from the Middle East.

=== To X or not to X ===
"To X or not to X" is a template based on the line "To be, or not to be", spoken by the titular character in William Shakespeare's play Hamlet (around 1600). This template appears to have existed even before Hamlet and had previously been explicitly used in a religious context to discuss "actions that are at once contradictory and indifferent—actions that, because they are neither commanded nor prohibited by Scripture, good nor evil in themselves, Christians are free to perform or omit".

In general usage, "to X or not to X" simply conveys "disjunction between contradictory alternatives", which linguist Arnold Zwicky described as an "utterly ordinary structure". A Google search by Zwicky for snowclones of the form "to * or not to *" resulted in over 16 million hits, although some apparent occurrences may be cases of a natural contrastive disjunction unrelated to the Shakespearean snowclone template.

=== Have X, will travel ===
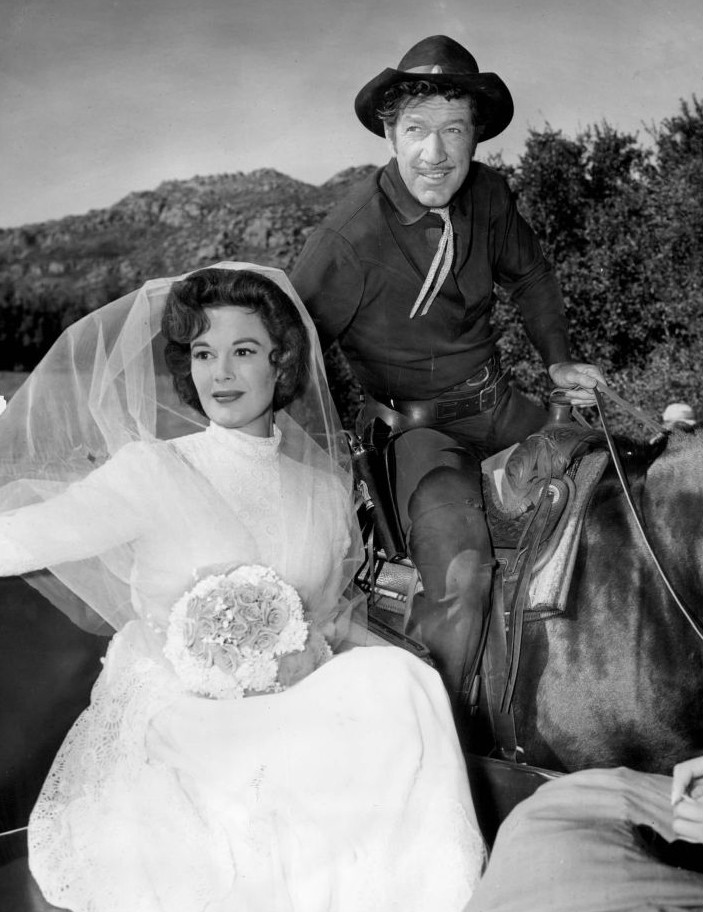
Have Gun – Will Travel, 1959

The earliest known literary mention of the template "Have X, will travel" is the title of the book Have Tux, Will Travel, a 1954 memoir by comedian Bob Hope. Hope explained that "Have tuxedo, will travel" was a stock phrase used in short advertisements placed by actors in Variety, indicating that the actor was "ready to go any place any time" and to be "dressed classy" upon arrival. The use of variations of this template by job seekers goes back considerably earlier, dating to at least the 1920s, possibly around 1900, in The Times of London.

Variants of the snowclone were used in the titles of the 1957 Western television show Have Gun – Will Travel, Robert A. Heinlein's 1958 novel Have Space Suit—Will Travel, Richard Berry's 1959 song "Have Love, Will Travel", The Three Stooges' 1959 film Have Rocket, Will Travel, Bo Diddley's 1960 album Have Guitar Will Travel, Megadeth's 1997 song "Have Cool, Will Travel", and Joe Perry's 2009 album Have Guitar, Will Travel.

=== The Tao of X ===
Beginning with Fritjof Capra's The Tao of Physics and Bruce Lee's The Tao of Jeet Kune Do, both published in 1975, there have been numerous sometimes serious but more often tongue in cheek examples of this snowclone. Examples include the 2000 romantic comedy The Tao of Steve and the 1982 philosophical treatise The Tao of Pooh by Benjamin Hoff.

=== X considered harmful ===
"X considered harmful", an established journalistic cliché since at least the mid-20th century, generally appears in the titles of articles as "a way for an editor to alert readers that the writer is going to be expressing negative opinions about X." As a snowclone, the template began to propagate significantly in the field of computer science in 1968. Its spread was prompted by a letter to the editor titled Go To Statement Considered Harmful, in which Edsger Dijkstra criticized the GOTO statement in computer programming. The editor of Communications of the ACM, Niklaus Wirth, was responsible for giving the letter its evocative title.

=== X as a service ===
"X as a service" (XaaS) is a business model in which a product use is offered as a subscription-based service rather than as an artifact owned and maintained by the customer. Originating from the software as a service concept that appeared in the 2010s with the advent of cloud computing, the template has expanded to numerous offerings in the field of information technology and beyond it, such as mobility as a service.

=== X 2: Electric Boogaloo ===
"X 2: Electric Boogaloo" is a snowclone of the movie title Breakin' 2: Electric Boogaloo, meaning a sequel or second edition of something.

=== Big X ===
Originated as "Big Oil" — a way to refer to the world's largest oil and gas companies, following the 1979 oil crisis. The first recorded use of this term can be attributed to TIME's article Inside the Big Oil Game from May 7, 1979. Over the years the term evolved to refer to a variety of major industries such as "Big Pharma", "Big Tech", "Big Soda" etc. and is now also used jokingly as an hyperbole to talk about a meaningless and nonexistent entity as if it was a big industry, for example: “Minimalism is a scam invented by big small to sell more less”.

== Similar concepts ==
In 1995, linguist David Crystal referred to this kind of trope as a "catch structure", citing as an example the phrase "to boldly split infinitives that no man had split before", as originally used in Douglas Adams's The Hitchhiker's Guide to the Galaxy radio series (1978). The phrase references Star Trek ("... to boldly go where no man has gone before"), humorously highlighting the use of a split infinitive as an intentional violation of a disputed traditional rule of grammar.

In the study of folklore, the related concept of a proverbial phrase has a long history of description and analysis. There are many kinds of such wordplay, as described in various studies of written and oral sources.

=== Liberated suffixes ===
Suffixes created from a shortened form of a word are sometimes called snowclones, but can also be described as libfixes, short for 'liberated suffix'. These are "lexical word-formation analog... [in] derivational morphology". Libfixes include formations like the English -gate suffix drawn from the Watergate scandal, or the Italian -opoli, abstracted from the Tangentopoli scandal.

== See also ==
- Anti-proverb
- Construction grammar
- Phrasal template
- Copypasta
- List of Mcface spoofs
- -stan, used as a cliché suffix for fictional country names
