= List of Pixar awards and nominations (short films) =

Pixar Animation Studios has released many short films and received awards for many of them.

== Luxo Jr. ==
Awards for Luxo Jr.
Year	Association	Award Category	Recipient (If Any)	Status
1986	Ottawa International Animation Festival	Best film less than 5 Minutes	John Lasseter & William Reeves	2nd Place
1987	Academy Awards	Best Short Film, Animated	John Lasseter & William Reeves	Nominated
1987	Berlin International Film Festival	Best Short Film	John Lasseter & William Reeves	Won
1987	World Animation Celebration	Computer Assisted Animation	John Lasseter & William Reeves	Won
2014	National Film Preservation Board	Added to the National Film Registry		Won

== Tin Toy ==
Awards for Tin Toy
Year	Association	Award Category	Recipient (if any)	Status
1989	Academy Awards	Best Animated Short Film	John Lasseter & William Reeves	Won
1989	Seattle International Film Festival	Best Short Film	John Lasseter & William Reeves	Won
1989	World Animation Celebration	Computer-Assisted Animation		Won
2003	National Film Preservation Board	Added to the National Film Registry.		Won

== Knick Knack ==
Awards for Knick Knack
Year	Association	Award Category	Recipient (if any)	Status
1990	Seattle International Film Festival	Best Short Film	John Lasseter	Won

== Geri's Game ==
Awards for Geri's Game
Year	Association	Award Category	Recipient (if any)	Status
1997	Academy Awards	Best Short Film, Animated	Jan Pinkava	Won
1998	Anima Mundi Animation Festival	Audience Award, Best Film - Rio de Janeiro Selection	Jan Pinkava	Won
1998	Anima Mundi Animation Festival	Audience Award, Best Film - São Paulo Selection	Jan Pinkava	Won
1998	Annecy International Animated Film Festival	Audience Award	Jan Pinkava	Won
1998	Annie Awards	Outstanding Achievement in an Animated Short Subject		Won
1998	Florida Film Festival	Best Short	Jan Pinkava	Won
1998	World Animation Celebration	Best 3-D CGI by Professional	Jan Pinkava	Won
1998	Zagreb World Festival of Animated Films	Internet Favorite	Jan Pinkava	Won

== For the Birds ==
Awards for For the Birds
Year	Association	Award Category	Recipient (if any)	Status
2000	Annie Awards	Outstanding Achievement in an Animated Short Subject		Won
2000	Sitges-Catalan International Film Festival	Best Animated Short Film	Ralph Eggleston	Won
2001	Anima Mundi Animation Festival	Audience Award, Best Film - Rio de Janeiro Selection	Ralph Eggleston	Won
2001	Anima Mundi Animation Festival	Audience Award, Best Film - São Paulo Selection	Ralph Eggleston	Won
2001	Chicago International Children's Film Festival	Short Film or Video - Animation	Ralph Eggleston	2nd Place
2001	Vancouver Effects and Animation Festival	Animated Computer 3D Short	Ralph Eggleston, Karen Dufilho, John Lasseter, Bill Wise & James Ford Murphy	1st Place
2002	Academy Awards	Best Short Film, Animated	Ralph Eggleston	Won

== Mike's New Car ==
Awards for Mike's New Car
Year	Association	Award Category	Recipient (if any)	Status
2003	Academy Awards	Best Short Film, Animated	Pete Docter & Roger Gould	Nominated
2003	DVD Exclusive Awards	Best New, Enhanced or Reconstructed Movie Scenes	Pete Docter, Roger Gould & Gale Gortney	Nominated

== Boundin' ==
Awards for Boundin'
Year	Association	Award Category	Recipient (if any)	Status
2004	Academy Awards	Best Short Film, Animated	Bud Luckey	Nominated
2004	Annie Awards	Outstanding Achievement in an Animated Short Subject		Won

== Jack-Jack Attack ==
Awards for Jack-Jack Attack
Year	Association	Award Category	Recipient (if any)	Status
2006	Hugo Awards	Best Dramatic Presentation - Short Form		Nominated

== One Man Band ==
Awards for One Man Band
Year	Association	Award Category	Recipient (if any)	Status
2006	Academy Awards	Best Short Film, Animated	Mark Andrews & Andrew Jimenez	Nominated

== Lifted ==
Awards for Lifted
Year	Association	Award Category	Recipient (if any)	Status
2007	Academy Awards	Best Short Film, Animated	Gary Rydstrom	Nominated

== Your Friend the Rat ==
Awards for Your Friend the Rat
Year	Association	Award Category	Recipient (if any)	Status
2008	Annie Awards	Best Animated Short Subject		Won

== Presto ==
Awards for Presto
Year	Association	Award Category	Recipient (if any)	Status
2009	Academy Awards	Best Short Film - Animated	Doug Sweetland	Nominated
2009	Annie Awards	Best Animated Short Subject		Nominated

== Day & Night ==
Awards for Day & Night
Year	Association	Award Category	Recipient (if any)	Status
2010	Academy Awards	Best Short Film - Animated		Nominated
2010	Annie Awards	Best Animated Short Subject		Won
2010	Visual Effects Society	Outstanding Achievement in an Animated Short		Won
2011	3D Creative Arts Awards	Lumiere Award - Best 3D Short		Won

== La Luna ==
Awards for La Luna
Year	Association	Award Category	Recipient (if any)	Status
2011	Academy Awards	Best Short Film - Animated	Enrico Casarosa	Nominated
2011	Annie Awards	Best Animated Short Subject		Nominated

== Sanjay's Super Team ==
Awards for Sanjay's Super Team
Year	Association	Award Category	Recipient (if any)	Status
2015	Academy Awards	Best Short Film - Animated	Sanjay Patel	Nominated
2015	Annie Awards	Best Animated Short Subject		Nominated

== Piper ==
Awards for Piper
Year	Association	Award Category	Recipient (if any)	Status
2016	Academy Awards	Best Animated Short Film	Alan Barillaro and Marc Sondheimer	Won
2016	Annie Awards	Best Animated Short Subject		Won

== Lou ==
Awards for Lou
Year	Association	Award Category	Recipient (if any)	Status
2017	Academy Awards	Best Animated Short Film	Dave Mullins and Dana Murray	Nominated

== Bao ==
Awards for Bao
Year	Association	Award Category	Recipient (if any)	Status
2018	Academy Awards	Best Animated Short Film	Becky Neiman-Cobb & Domee Shi	Won
