= Félix Lajeunesse =

Canadian filmmaker and virtual reality content creator

- Born: Sherbrooke, Quebec, Canada
- Occupations: Director; writer; producer; cinematographer; editor
- Years active: 2004–present

Félix Lajeunesse is a Canadian film director, writer, and producer, and virtual reality content creator. He is the co-founder and chief creative officer at Felix & Paul Studios.

== Life and career ==
Lajeunesse was born in Sherbrooke, Quebec, Canada. He graduated with a film production degree from the Mel Hoppenheim School of Cinema at Concordia University. He has received various accolades, including two Primetime Emmy Awards for The People's House: Inside the White House with Barack and Michelle Obama and for Space Explorers: The ISS Experience.

== Filmography ==
Year	Film	Director	Writer	Note
2023	Jim Henson’s The Storyteller: The Seven Ravens	Yes	Yes	Interactive AR experience
2021-2023	Space Explorers: The Infinite	Yes	Yes	Large-scale interactive touring exhibit - 60 minutes
2020-2022	Space Explorers: The ISS Experience	Yes	Yes	4 episodes
2019	Traveling While Black	Yes	Yes	Immersive 360 3D VR documentary film
2019	Marshall From Detroit	Yes	Yes	Immersive 360 3D VR documentary film
2018	Space Explorers: The Journey Begins	Yes	Yes	Immersive 360 3D VR documentary series
2018	Jurassic World: Blue	Yes	Yes	Immersive 360 3D VR fiction film
2017	Cirque du Soleil: Dreams of 'O' VR	Yes	Yes	Immersive 360 3D VR fiction film
2017	The People's House: Inside the White House with Barack and Michelle Obama	Yes	Yes	Immersive 360 3D VR documentary film
2017	Miyubi	Yes	Yes	Immersive 360 3D VR fiction film
2017	Cirque du Soleil: Through the Masks of Luzia	Yes	Yes	Immersive 360 3D VR fiction film
2017	The Confessional	Yes	Yes	Immersive 360 3D VR documentary series
2016	Nomads	Yes	Yes	Immersive 360 3D VR documentary series
2016	Cirque du Soleil: KÀ The Battle Within	Yes	Yes	Immersive 360 3D VR fiction film
2016	Through the Ages: President Obama Celebrates America's National Parks	Yes	Yes	Immersive 360 3D VR documentary film
2015	Inside the Box of Kurios	Yes	Yes	Immersive 360 3D VR fiction film
2015	Jurassic World: Apatosaurus	Yes	Yes	Immersive 360 3D VR fiction film
2015	Wild: The Experience	Yes	Yes	Immersive 360 3D VR film
2015	Inside Impact: East Africa with President Clinton	Yes	Yes	Immersive 360 3D VR documentary film
2015	Lebron James: Striving for Greatness	Yes	Yes	5 episodes
2014	Introduction to Virtual Reality	Yes	Yes	Immersive 360 3D VR documentary film
2014	Strangers with Patrick Watson	Yes	Yes	Immersive 360 3D VR documentary film
2013	The Sparkling River	Yes	Yes	3D fiction film
2009	Tusarnituuq! Nagano in the Land of the Inuit	Yes	Yes	2D documentary film
2009	Tungijuq	Yes	Yes	2D documentary film

=== As editor ===
- Before Tomorrow (2008)
- The Journals of Knud Rasmussen (2006)

=== As cinematographer ===
- Uvanga (2013)
- Before Tomorrow (2008)

== Awards and nominations ==
Year	Result	Award	Category	Work	Ref.
2023	Won	Webby Awards	Metaverse, Immersive & Virtual Technical Achievement	Spacewalkers Extended	
2022	Nominated	South by Southwest	Innovation Award	The Infinite	
2022	Won	Canadian Screen Awards	Best Immersive Experience, Nonfiction	Space Explorers: The ISS Experience	
2021	Won	Primetime Emmy Awards	Outstanding Interactive Program	Space Explorers: The ISS Experience	
2021	Won	Webby Awards	Science & Education and Best VR Video	Space Explorers: The ISS Experience	
2020	Won	Canadian Screen Awards	Best Immersive Experience, Fiction	Gymnasia	
2020	Won	Canadian Screen Awards	Best Immersive Experience, Nonfiction	Traveling While Black	
2020	Won	FIPADOC	SMART Award	Traveling While Black	
2020	Won	Webby Awards	best Documentary (Immersive And Mixed Reality)	Traveling While Black	
2019	Won	B3 Biennial of the Moving Image	Best VR/AR/MR	Gymnasia	
2019	Won	Manchester Animation Festival	Best VR Short Film	Gymnasia	
2019	Won	Ottawa International Animation Festival	Best VR Animation	Gymnasia	
2019	Won	Webby Awards	Best Video - Best Branded CInematic or Pre-Rendered	Isle of Dogs: Behind the Scenes in VR	
2019	Won	Webby Awards	People's Voice	Isle of Dogs: Behind the Scenes in VR	
2018	Won	Canadian Screen Awards	Best Immersive Experience	Miyubi	
2017	Won	Peabody Awards	Virtual Reality/360	Miyubi	
2017	Won	South by Southwest	Special Jury Recognition	Dreams of 'O'	
2017	Won	Primetime Emmy Awards	Outstanding Interactive Program	The People's House	
2017	Won	Canadian Screen Awards	Best Immersive Experience	Nomads	
2016	Won	Daytime Emmy Awards	Outstanding Interactive Media - Original Daytime Program or Series	Inside the Box of Kurios	
