= Amazon Paint =

- Amazon Paint 3.03 for IRIX
- Developers: Interactive Effects, Inc.
- Final release: 3.5
- Operating system: IRIX, Linux
- Type: 2D computer graphics
- License: Proprietary

Amazon Paint was a Unix-based digital paint program produced by Interactive Effects, Inc. It featured 2D and 3D paint modes, 16-bit per channel color, layers, scripting, and a number of image processing filters. It was used to produce imagery for feature films, TV shows, and electronic entertainment titles throughout the 1990s and early 2000s. Amazon Paint has been superseded by Piranha.

== Release history ==
Version	Platform	Release date	Price	Notes
Amazon Paint 1.2	SGI	Oct 1993	$2,250	Features layers, 40 image processing effects, custom brushes
Amazon Paint 2.0	SGI	Jul 1995	$3,000 ($2,000 each for 3D Paint and Sweet 16 16-bit color addons)	Introduced TCL scripting
Amazon Paint 2.5	SGI	Apr 1997	-	Resolution-independent layering, optimized for SGI O2 & Octane
Amazon Paint 3.0	SGI/Linux	Jul 1998	-	Redesigned interface, introduced projectile paint
Amazon Paint 3.5	SGI/Linux	May 2002	-	Final release

== Credits ==
=== Films ===
- 1994: Interview with the Vampire, The Santa Clause, True Lies
- 1995: 12 Monkeys, Apollo 13, Die Hard with a Vengeance, Judge Dredd, Outbreak, Species, Toy Story, Waterworld
- 1996: Black Sheep, The Nutty Professor
- 1997: Geri's Game
- 1998: The Prince of Egypt, A Bug's Life
- 1999: Fight Club, Galaxy Quest, The Haunting, The Matrix, Toy Story 2
- 2000: For the Birds, Hollow Man, Mission: Impossible 2, The Grinch
- 2001: Final Fantasy: The Spirits Within, Monsters, Inc., Moulin Rouge!, Shrek

=== Television ===
- The X-Files
- The Outer Limits
