= Paul Raphaël =

Canadian filmmaker and virtual reality content creator

- Born: Canada
- Occupations: Director; writer; editor; producer
- Years active: 2003–present

Paul Raphaël is a Canadian film director, and virtual reality content creator. He is the co-founder and chief innovation officer at Felix & Paul Studios.

== Career ==
Raphaël graduated from the Mel Hoppenheim School of Cinema at Concordia University. After graduation he animated and directed music video for Akido, The Killers and Young Galaxy, along with Félix Lajeunesse. He has earned several awards including five Canadian Screen Awards, four Webby Awards, and two Primetime Emmy Awards.

== Selected filmography ==
Year	Film	Director	Writer	Note
2014	Strangers with Patrick Watson	Yes	Yes	Immersive 360 3D VR documentary film
2017	Miyubi	Yes	Yes	Immersive 360 3D VR fiction film
2017	The People's House: Inside the White House with Barack and Michelle Obama	Yes	Yes	Immersive 360 3D VR documentary film
2019	Traveling While Black	Yes	Yes	Immersive 360 3D VR documentary film
2020-2022	Space Explorers: The ISS Experience	Yes	Yes	4 episodes
2023	Jim Henson’s The Storyteller: The Seven Ravens	Yes	Yes	Interactive AR experience
2025	Interstellar Arc	Yes	Yes	Large-scale location-based virtual reality experience

== Awards and nominations ==
Year	Result	Award	Category	Work	Ref.
2023	Won	Webby Awards	Metaverse, Immersive & Virtual Technical Achievement	Spacewalkers Extended	
2022	Won	Canadian Screen Awards	Best Immersive Experience, Nonfiction	Space Explorers: The ISS Experience	
2021	Won	Primetime Emmy Awards	Outstanding Interactive Program	Space Explorers: The ISS Experience	
2021	Won	FIPADOC	SMART Award	Traveling While Black	
2021	Won	Webby Awards	best Documentary (Immersive And Mixed Reality)	Traveling While Black	
2019	Nominated	Primetime Emmy Awards	Outstanding Interactive Program	Traveling While Black	
2017	Won	Primetime Emmy Awards	Outstanding Interactive Program	The People's House	
