= List of awards and nominations received by Conan O'Brien =

Conan O'Brien awards and nominations
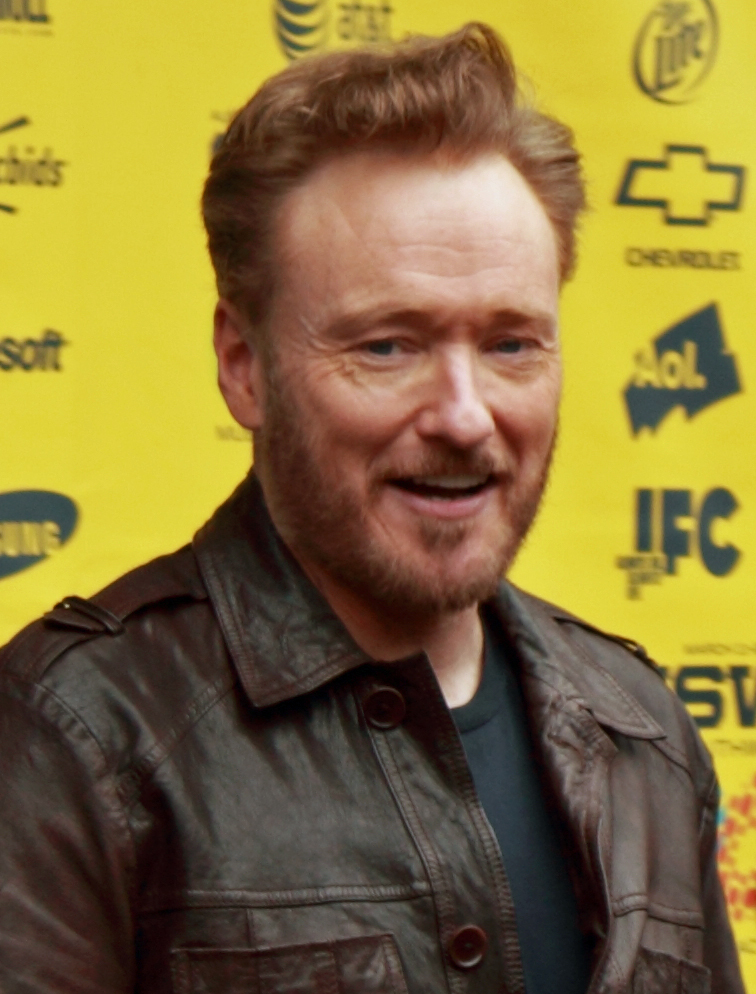
- O'Brien in 2011
Awards and nominations
Award	Wins	Nominations
Emmy Awards	5	31
People's Choice Awards	1	10
Writers Guild of America Awards	7	19

Totals (Note: Certain award groups do not simply award one winner. They acknowledge several different recipients, have runners-up, and have third place. Since this is a specific recognition and is different from losing an award, runner-up mentions are considered wins in this award tally. For simplification and to avoid errors, each award in this list has been presumed to have had a prior nomination.)
- Wins: 15
- Nominations: 75

The following is a list of awards and nominations received by Conan O'Brien.

Conan O'Brien is a television host, comedian, writer, and producer Conan O'Brien. He has served as a writer for Saturday Night Live (1987–1991), The Simpsons (1991–1993), before embarking on late night television with his own shows, Late Night with Conan O'Brien (1993–2009), The Tonight Show with Conan O'Brien (2009–2010), Conan (2010–2021), and Conan O'Brien Must Go (2024).

O'Brien has received various awards including 28 Primetime Emmy Award nominations including four wins for his work on Saturday Night Live, Late Night with Conan O'Brien, Conan and Conan Without Borders. He won the Primetime Emmy Award for Outstanding Writing for a Variety Series for Saturday Night Live in 1989. He won his second Emmy for Primetime Emmy Award for Outstanding Writing for a Variety Series for Late Night with Conan O'Brien in 2007. He later won the Primetime Emmy Award for Outstanding Writing for a Nonfiction Programming for Conan O'Brien Must Go in 2024. He has also received seven Writers Guild of America Awards for his late night programs.

In addition to recognition for his works, O'Brien himself has received multiple honors. He was named one of Time's 100 Most Influential People in 2010. In 2025, he was awarded the Mark Twain Prize for American Humor and was inducted into the Television Academy Hall of Fame.

== Major associations ==
=== Emmy Awards ===
Year	Category	Nominated work	Result	Ref.
Primetime Emmy Awards
1989	Outstanding Writing in a Variety or Music Program	Saturday Night Live	Won	
1990	Outstanding Writing in a Variety or Music Program	Saturday Night Live	Nominated	
1991	Outstanding Writing in a Variety or Music Program	Saturday Night Live	Nominated	
1996	Outstanding Writing in a Variety or Music Program	Late Night with Conan O'Brien	Nominated	
1997	Outstanding Writing in a Variety or Music Program	Late Night with Conan O'Brien	Nominated	
1998	Outstanding Writing in a Variety or Music Program	Late Night with Conan O'Brien	Nominated	
1999	Outstanding Writing in a Variety or Music Program	Late Night with Conan O'Brien	Nominated	
2000	Outstanding Writing in a Variety or Music Program	Late Night with Conan O'Brien	Nominated	
2001	Outstanding Writing in a Variety or Music Program	Late Night with Conan O'Brien	Nominated	
2002	Outstanding Writing in a Variety or Music Program	Late Night with Conan O'Brien	Nominated	
2003	Outstanding Writing in a Variety or Music Program	Late Night with Conan O'Brien	Nominated	
2004	Outstanding Writing in a Variety or Music Program	Late Night with Conan O'Brien	Nominated	
2005	Outstanding Writing in a Variety or Music Program	Late Night with Conan O'Brien	Nominated	
2006	Outstanding Writing in a Variety or Music Program	Late Night with Conan O'Brien	Nominated	
2007	Outstanding Writing in a Variety or Music Program	Late Night with Conan O'Brien	Won	
2008	Outstanding Writing in a Variety or Music Program	Late Night with Conan O'Brien	Nominated	
2009	Outstanding Writing in a Variety or Music Program	Late Night with Conan O'Brien	Nominated	
2010	Outstanding Writing in a Variety or Music Program	The Tonight Show with Conan O'Brien	Nominated	
2010	Outstanding Variety, Music or Comedy Series	The Tonight Show with Conan O'Brien	Nominated	
2011	Outstanding Variety, Music or Comedy Series	Conan	Nominated	
2011	Outstanding Writing for a Variety, Music, or Comedy Series	Conan	Nominated	
2011	Outstanding Creative Achievement in Interactive Media	Conan	Nominated	
2012	Outstanding Emerging Media Program	Conan	Won	
2013	Outstanding Interactive Program	Conan	Nominated	
2016	Outstanding Interactive Program	Conan	Nominated	
2018	Outstanding Emerging Media Program	Conan Without Borders	Won	
2019	Outstanding Emerging Media Program	Conan Without Borders	Nominated	
2019	Outstanding Interactive Program	Conan	Nominated	
2021	Outstanding Variety Talk Series	Conan	Nominated	
2024	Outstanding Hosted Nonfiction Series or Special	Conan O'Brien Must Go	Nominated	
2024	Outstanding Writing for a Nonfiction Program	Conan O'Brien Must Go	Won	
2025	Outstanding Hosted Nonfiction Series or Special	Conan O'Brien Must Go	Won	
2025	Outstanding Writing for a Nonfiction Program	Conan O'Brien Must Go	Nominated	
2025	Outstanding Variety Special (Live)	97th Academy Awards	Nominated	
2026	Outstanding Variety Special (Live)	98th Academy Awards	Nominated	
2026	Outstanding Writing for a Variety Special	98th Academy Awards	Nominated	
2026	Outstanding Limited or Anthology Series	The Beast in Me	Nominated	

=== Writers Guild of America Awards ===
Year	Category	Nominated work	Result
1997	Comedy/Variety (Including Talk) – Series	Late Night with Conan O'Brien	Won
1999	Comedy/Variety (Including Talk) – Series	Late Night with Conan O'Brien	Nominated
2000	Comedy/Variety (Including Talk) – Series	Late Night with Conan O'Brien	Won
2001	Comedy/Variety (Including Talk) – Series	Late Night with Conan O'Brien	Nominated
2002	Comedy/Variety (Including Talk) – Series	Late Night with Conan O'Brien	Won
2003	Comedy/Variety (Including Talk) – Series	Late Night with Conan O'Brien	Won
2004	Comedy/Variety (Including Talk) – Series	Late Night with Conan O'Brien	Nominated
2005	Comedy/Variety (Including Talk) – Series	Late Night with Conan O'Brien	Won
2006	Comedy/Variety (Including Talk) – Series	Late Night with Conan O'Brien	Won
2007	Comedy/Variety (Including Talk) – Series	Late Night with Conan O'Brien	Nominated
2008	Comedy/Variety (Including Talk) – Series	Late Night with Conan O'Brien	Nominated
2009	Comedy/Variety (Including Talk) – Series	Late Night with Conan O'Brien	Nominated
2010	Comedy/Variety (Including Talk) – Series	The Tonight Show with Conan O'Brien	Nominated
2012	Comedy/Variety (Including Talk) – Series	Conan	Nominated
2013	Comedy/Variety (Including Talk) – Series	Conan	Nominated
2014	Comedy/Variety (Including Talk) – Series	Conan	Nominated
2016	Comedy/Variety – Talk Series	Conan	Nominated
2018	Comedy/Variety – Talk Series	Conan	Nominated
2020	Comedy/Variety – Talk Series	Conan	Nominated
2022	Comedy/Variety – Talk Series	Conan	Won

== Miscellaneous awards ==
=== American Comedy Awards ===
Year	Nominated work	Category	Result
2014	Best Late Night Talk Show	Conan	Nominated

=== CableAce Awards ===
Year	Nominated work	Category	Result
1987	CableAce Award for Writing a Comedy Series	Not Necessarily the News	Nominated
1988	CableAce Award for Writing a Comedy Series	Not Necessarily the News	Nominated

=== Critics' Choice Awards ===
Year	Nominated work	Category	Result
2012	Conan	Best Talk Show	Nominated
2013	Conan	Best Talk Show	Nominated
2014	Conan	Best Talk Show	Nominated

=== GLAAD Media Awards ===
Year	Nominated work	Category	Result
2012	GLAAD Media Award for Outstanding Talk Show Episode	Conan	Nominated

=== Honorary degrees ===
Year	University	Degree
2011	Dartmouth College	Doctor of Arts
2026	Harvard University	Doctor of Arts

=== iHeartRadio Podcast Awards ===
Year	Nominated work	Category	Result
2020	Podcast of the Year	Conan O'Brien Needs a Friend	Nominated
2020	Best Comedy Podcast	Conan O'Brien Needs a Friend	Won
2020	Best Ad Read	Conan O'Brien Needs a Friend	Won

=== People's Choice Awards ===
Year	Nominated work	Category	Result
2005	Late Night with Conan O'Brien	Favorite Late Night Talk Show Host	Nominated
2006	Late Night with Conan O'Brien	Favorite Late Night Talk Show Host	Nominated
2011	Conan	Favorite Late Night Talk Show Host	Won
2012	Conan	Favorite Late Night Talk Show Host	Nominated
2013	Conan	Favorite Late Night TV Host	Nominated
2014	Conan	Favorite Late Night TV Host	Nominated
2015	Conan	Favorite Late Night Talk Show Host	Nominated
2016	Conan	Favorite Late Night Talk Show Host	Nominated
2017	Conan	Favorite Late Night Talk Show Host	Nominated
2017	Conan	Favorite Comedic Collaboration	Nominated

=== Teen Choice Awards ===
Year	Nominated work	Category	Result
2003	Teen Choice Award for Choice TV: Late Night	Late Night with Conan O'Brien	Nominated
2004	Teen Choice Award for Choice TV Show: Late Night	Late Night with Conan O'Brien	Nominated
2009	Teen Choice Award for Choice TV: Late Night	The Tonight Show with Conan O'Brien	Nominated

== Special honors ==
Year	Award	Result	Ref.
2025	Mark Twain Prize for American Humor	Honored	
2025	Television Academy Hall of Fame	Honored	
