= List of movies filmed in outer space =

As of 2024, several documentaries and at least three feature films have been partially filmed in outer space.

Feature films shot in outer space
Year	Title	Country	Notes
1984	Return from Orbit	Soviet Union	The film featured scenes that were shot on board the Salyut 7. However, the film's actors did not travel to space for any filming, with Russian cosmonauts having instead captured footage.
2016	Yolki 5	Russia	Contains a segment set in the International Space Station.
2023	The Challenge	Russia	Widely reported by media sources as the first feature-length movie filmed in space. Unlike Return from Orbit, the film's director and lead actress actually filmed in space, for a period of twelve days. Scenes were shot aboard the International Space Station.
TBA	untitled film starring Tom Cruise	United States	Announced in 2020 by Doug Liman and Tom Cruise. The film will have scenes shot aboard the International Space Station, with its production collaborating with SpaceX. The film was intended to be the first feature film shot in space, before it was beat by The Challenge.

Short films shot in outer space
Year	Title	Country	Notes
2012	Apogee of Fear	United States	Filmed entirely in space, while aboard the International Space Station.

Documentaries shot in outer space
Year	Title	Country	Notes
1989	For All Mankind	United States	Made from original footage of the missions of the Apollo program.
1997	Mission to Mir	United States	Compiled from a footage shot in the Mir space station from IMAX cameras.
2002	Space Station 3D	United States; Canada	A first 3D live-action film shot in space narrated by Tom Cruise.
2016	A Beautiful Planet	United States	Filmed aboard the International Space Station, with IMAX digital cameras.
2020	Space Explorers: The ISS Experience	Canada	Virtual reality series

Failed attempts to shoot films in outer space
Year	Title	Country	Notes
2003	Thieves and Prostitutes. Spaceflight is the Prize	Russia	Actor Vladimir Steklov trained and was assigned for a 2000 flight on Soyuz TM-30 to film scenes for the movie on Mir. The plans were scrapped due to lack of funding, and space scenes were filmed in studio instead.
2016	Sexplorations	United States	A porn film project planned by Pornhub and crowdfunded via Indiegogo. The campaign failed to gather the intended sum.

== See also ==
- List of films featuring space stations
