= Felix & Paul Studios =

Canadian virtual-reality film studio

- Type: Virtual reality film studio
- Industry: Films and virtual reality
- Founded: 2013
- Founder: Félix Lajeunesse; Paul Raphaël; Stéphane Rituit
- Headquarters: Montreal, Quebec, Canada
- Website: felixandpaul.com

Felix & Paul Studios was a Canadian creator of immersive virtual reality (VR) entertainment. The studio is known for its originals Space Explorers: The ISS Experience, and Traveling While Black.

Felix & Paul Studios is recognized as an official implementation partner by the ISS National Lab. The studio has earned five Canadian Screen Awards, two Primetime Emmy Awards, and a Daytime Emmy, along with numerous other awards and acknowledgments.

== History ==
Felix & Paul Studios was founded in 2013 by directors Félix Lajeunesse and Paul Raphaël and producer Stéphane Rituit. Lajeunesse and Raphael teamed up to co-direct music videos and commercials. Eventually, they turned their attention to immersive cinematic experiences, creating 3D film installations. Felix & Paul Studios' first VR experience, Strangers With Patrick Watson, was released at South by Southwest in 2014.

It closed on August 2026, after failing to find a buyer ready to absorb the accumlated debt.

== Selected filmography ==
=== Space Explorers: The ISS Experience ===
Space Explorers: The ISS Experience, produced in association with Time Studios is the largest production ever filmed entirely in space.

=== The Infinite ===
The first multisensory and interactive virtual reality experience aboard the International Space Station. The Infinite is an extension of the virtual reality series Space Explorers: The ISS Experience.

== Awards and nominations ==
Year	Result	Award	Category	Work	Ref.
2022	Won	Canadian Screen Awards	Best Immersive Experience, Nonfiction	Space Explorers: The ISS Experience	
2021	Won	Primetime Emmy Awards	Outstanding Interactive Program	Space Explorers: The ISS Experience	
2021	Won	Webby Awards	Science & Education and Best VR Video	Space Explorers: The ISS Experience	
2020	Won	Canadian Screen Awards	Best Immersive Experience, Fiction	Gymnasia	
2020	Won	Canadian Screen Awards	Best Immersive Experience, Nonfiction	Traveling While Black	
2020	Won	FIPADOC	SMART Award	Traveling While Black	
2020	Won	Webby Awards	best Documentary (Immersive And Mixed Reality)	Traveling While Black	
2019	Won	B3 Biennial of the Moving Image	Best VR/AR/MR	Gymnasia	
2019	Won	Manchester Animation Festival	Best VR Short Film	Gymnasia	
2019	Won	Ottawa International Animation Festival	Best VR Animation	Gymnasia	
2019	Won	Webby Awards	Best Video - Best Branded CInematic or Pre-Rendered	Isle of Dogs: Behind the Scenes in VR	
2019	Won	Webby Awards	People's Voice	Isle of Dogs: Behind the Scenes in VR	
2018	Won	Canadian Screen Awards	Best Immersive Experience	Miyubi	
2017	Won	Peabody Awards	Virtual Reality/360	Miyubi	
2017	Won	South by Southwest	Special Jury Recognition	Dreams of 'O'	
2017	Won	Primetime Emmy Awards	Outstanding Interactive Program	The People's House	
2017	Won	Canadian Screen Awards	Best Immersive Experience	Nomads	
2016	Won	Daytime Emmy Awards	Outstanding Interactive Media - Original Daytime Program or Series	Inside the Box of Kurios	
