= Miyubi =

- Film poster
- Directed by: Félix Lajeunesse & Paul Raphaël
- Written by: Owen Burke
- Production companies: Felix & Paul Studios; Funny or Die
- Distributed by: Gear VR; Oculus VR
- Release date: January 20, 2017 (Sundance)
- Running time: 40 minutes
- Country: Canada
- Language: English

Miyubi is a Canadian virtual reality film directed by Félix Lajeunesse and released in 2017. Produced by Felix & Paul Studios in conjunction with Funny or Die, the film is an immersive video comedy-drama in which the viewer experiences the dynamics of a dysfunctional family through the eyes of Miyubi, a toy robot the father purchased for his son as a birthday gift.

The film's cast includes Emily Bergl, P. J. Byrne, Owen Vaccaro and Richard Riehle, as well as an unlockable hidden scene which features Jeff Goldblum as Miyubi's creator.

The film premiered at the 2017 Sundance Film Festival, and was later distributed to the Gear VR and Oculus Rift virtual reality platforms.

The film won the Canadian Screen Award for Best Immersive Experience at the 6th Canadian Screen Awards.
