= Art Wolfe =

American photographer and conservationist

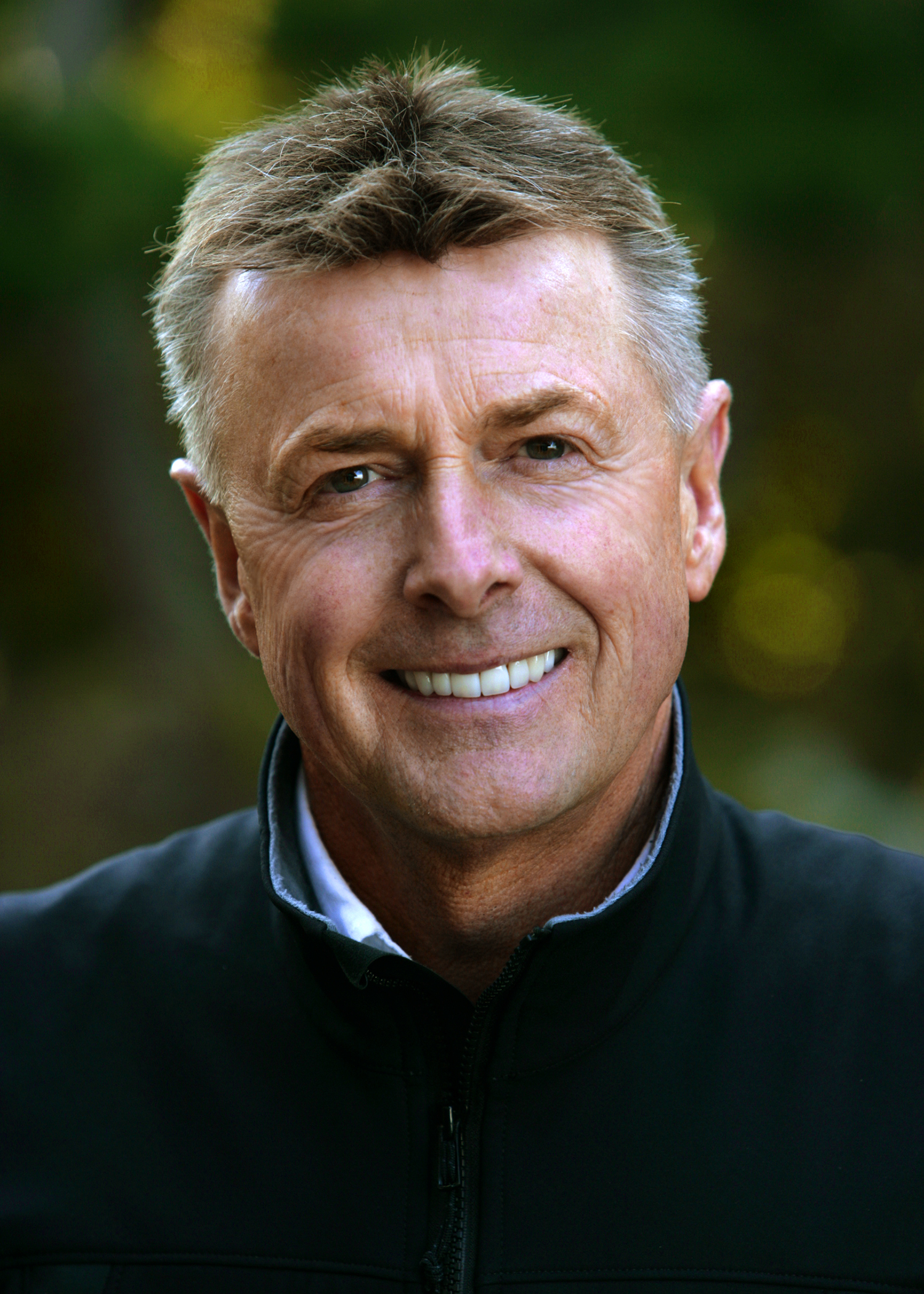
- Art Wolfe
- Born: September 13, 1965; Seattle, Washington
- Education: University of Washington at Seattle, BS Fine Arts (1955)
- Occupations: Photographer and Conservationist
- Parent(s): Richard and Ellinor Wolfe
- Website: www.artwolfe.com

Art Wolfe (born 1951) is an American photographer and conservationist, best known for color images of landscapes, wildlife, and native cultures. His photographs document scenes from every continent and hundreds of locations, and have been noted by environmental advocacy groups for their "stunning" visual impact.

Wolfe's career has been described as "multi-faceted", involving wildlife advocacy, art, journalism, and education. According to William Conway, former president of the Wildlife Conservation Society, Wolfe is a "prolific and sensitive recorder of a rapidly vanishing natural world." In the last 30 years, the public has viewed Wolfe's work in more than sixty published books, including Vanishing Act, The High Himalaya, Water: Worlds between Heaven & Earth, Tribes, Rainforests of the World, and The Art of Photographing Nature.

== Early life and education ==
Wolfe's parents were both commercial artists in Seattle, Washington. Wolfe graduated with a Bachelor of Fine Arts degree from the University of Washington. Within four years of graduation, Wolfe completed assignments for National Geographic magazine and produced his first photo book documenting Northwest Indian baskets.

== Career ==
Art Wolfe has released more than 65 photo books and instructional videos of photographic techniques. The U.S. Postal Service has used Wolfe's photographs on two stamps. He is an Honorary Fellow of the Royal Photographic Society and serves on the advisory boards for the Wildlife Conservation Society, Nature's Best Foundation, Bridges to Understanding, and is a Fellow of the International League of Conservation Photographers (ILCP).

== Documentary television series: Travels to the Edge with Art Wolfe ==
The public television series, Travels to the Edge with Art Wolfe, is a documentary project that explores environmental themes of visual interest. Art Wolfe's perspectives on nature, cultural diversity, geography and digital photography are the focus of each episode, as he travels to new global regions. The series is hosted by Art Wolfe and supported by a professional film team (Karel Bauer, Field Director/Director of Photography; Sean White, Director of Photography; John Greengo, Field Production; and Gavriel Jecan, Field Production).

The program began with the making of 13 episodes released in 2007. By 2009, 26 episodes were filmed in nearly as many locations, including Patagonia, Madagascar, Alaska, New Zealand, and India. Some of the specific subjects addressed include glaciers of Alaska, and sacred tattoos created by Maori artists. The program is produced by Oregon Public Broadcasting (OPB), distributed by American Public Television and aired on Create.

In 2015, Wolfe appeared in the Australian television series Tales by Light.

== Photographic and artistic methodology ==
Wolfe's approach to nature photography combines elements of photojournalism and art photography. Wolfe lists his major influences as Ernst Haas and Eliot Porter. In his 1994 book, Migrations, Wolfe presented photos that were documentary as well as others that were enhanced. Through a process called "cloning", for example, Wolfe strove to enhance visual patterns and create photos with potentially greater impact than originally captured.

== Books ==
- Light On the Land (1991, Beyond Words, Hillsboro, Oregon)
- Endangered Peoples (1993, Sierra Club, San Francisco)
- The Art of Photographing Nature (1993, Crown, New York)
- Migrations (1994, Beyond Words, Hillsboro, Oregon)
- Wasser: Welten zwischen Himmel und Erde (1997, Frederking & Thaler, Munich)
- Tribes (1997, Clarkson N. Potter, New York)
- Rainforests of the World: Water, Fire, Earth and Air (1998, Crown, New York)
- The Living Wild (2000, Wildlands, Seattle)
- Africa (2001, Wildlands, Seattle)
- High Himalaya (2001, Mountaineers, Seattle)
- Animal Action ABC (2003, Handprint, New York)
- Edge of the Earth, Corner of the Sky (2003, Wildlands, Seattle)
- Smithsonian Answer Book: Cats (2004, Smithsonian, Washington, DC)
- Vanishing Act (2005, Bulfinch, New York)
- On Puget Sound (2007, Sasquatch, Seattle)
- The New Art of Photographing Nature: An Updated Guide to Composing Stunning Images of Animals, Nature, and Landscapes (2013, Crown, New York)
- Earth is my Witness: The Photography of Art Wolfe (2014, Earth Aware, San Rafael, CA)
- Photographs from the Edge: A Master Photographer's Insights on Capturing an Extraordinary World (2016, Amphoto)

== Awards ==
- Photographer of the Year by Photo Media magazine, 1996
- Outstanding Nature Photographer of the Year, 1998, by the North American Nature Photography Association
- Alfred Eisenstaedt Awards for Magazine Photography, April 2000
- National Outdoor Book Award (Design and Artistic Merit), The Living Wild, 2001
- National Outdoor Book Award (Design and Artistic Merit), Edge of the Earth, Corner of the Sky, 2004
- Honorary Fellowship of The Royal Photographic Society in 2005.

== See also ==
- Nature photography
- Wildlife photography
