= Tales by Light =

- Genre: Documentary, reality, Photography
- Developed by: Canon Australia + Untitled Film Works
- Directed by: Abraham Joffe ACS
- Voices of: Jack Thompson (season 1); Sigrid Thornton (season 2)
- Country of origin: Australia
- Original language: English
- No. of seasons: 3
- No. of episodes: 12

Production
- Executive producer: Jason Mclean
- Producers: Abraham Joffe ACS, Louis Cooper Robinson
- Cinematography: Abraham Joffe ACS, Blake Castle, Dom West
- Editors: Lorna-Jean Bradley, Hayley Onikul, Rika Borthwick
- Running time: 30 minutes (season 1); 1 hour (season 2)
- Production company: Untitled Film Works

Original release
- Network: National Geographic (season 1–2); Network Ten (season 3)
- Release: 24 May 2015

Tales by Light is an Australian documentary reality television series airing on National Geographic. The program is branded content and a joint venture between National Geographic and Canon which follows a number of professional photographers travelling around the world to capture images which tell a story.

The program debuted on 24 May 2015 and was renewed for a second season which debuted on 25 October 2016. A third season premiered on Network Ten on 26 August 2018.

== Cast ==
- Art Wolfe (season 1)
- Peter Eastway (season 1)
- Richard I’Anson (season 1)
- Darren Jew (season 1)
- Krystle Wright (season 1)
- Jonathan Scott (season 2)
- Angela Scott (season 2)
- Eric Cheng (season 2)
- Stephen Dupont (season 2)
- Simon Lister (season 3)
- Shawn Heinrichs (season 3)
- Dylan River (season 3)

== Broadcast ==
In Australia, the first season of six half-hour episodes premiered on 24 May 2015 on National Geographic. The second season consisted of three hour-long episodes, and debuted on 25 October 2016. A third season moved to debut on Network Ten on 26 August 2018.

Internationally, the program became available via Netflix from 11 November 2016.

== Episodes ==
Series	Episode duration	Episodes	Originally released	
Series	Episode duration	Episodes	First released	Last released
1	30 minutes	6	24 May 2015	28 June 2015
2	60 minutes	3	25 October 2016	8 November 2016
3	60 minutes	3	26 August 2018	9 September 2018

=== Season 1 (2015) ===
No. overall	No. in season	Title	Original release date	Australian viewers
1	1	"Submerged"	24 May 2015	N/A
2	2	"Himalaya"	31 May 2015	N/A
3	3	"Adrenaline"	7 June 2015	N/A
4	4	"Wild"	14 June 2015	N/A
5	5	"Panorama"	21 June 2015	N/A
6	6	"Tribes"	28 June 2015	N/A

=== Season 2 (2016) ===
No. overall	No. in season	Title	Original release date	Australian viewers
7	1	"Sacred Nature - Jonathan and Angela Scott"	25 October 2016	N/A
8	2	"Misunderstood Marine Predators - Eric Cheng"	1 November 2016	N/A
9	3	"Life and Death - Stephen Dupont"	8 November 2016	N/A

=== Season 3 (2018) ===
No. overall	No. in season	Title	Original release date	Australian viewers
10	1	"Children in Need - Simon Lister"	26 August 2018	N/A
11	2	"Paradise in Peril - Shawn Heinrichs"	2 September 2018	N/A
12	3	"Preserving Indigenous Culture - Dylan River"	9 September 2018	N/A
