= Karen Dufilho-Rosen =

American film producer

- Born: Karen Michele Dufiho-Rosen; October 30, 1968 (age 57)

Karen Michele Dufilho-Rosen (born October 30, 1968) is a producer. She formerly worked for Pixar Shorts. She graduated from Scarborough High School in Houston, Texas, United States in 1987. and produced Jan Pinkava's Geri's Game and Ralph Eggleston's For the Birds, which both won Oscars for Best Animated Short Film.
