= Wetpixel =

Wetpixel is an online community website providing information on digital underwater photography and imaging. Established in 2001 by Eric Cheng, it is now published and edited by Adam Hanlon with assistance from Associate Editor Abu Mullens, Alex Mustard, Drew Wong, Cor Bosman, the volunteer Wetpixel staff, and numerous other contributors. Wetpixel includes news, features, equipment reviews, photo contests, and an active community forum.

In 2003, Wetpixel.com was awarded the Antibes Festival prize for Best Website, and in November 2005, Scuba Diving Magazine dubbed Wetpixel.com the Editor's Choice for Best Dive-Related Website.
