= Primetime Emmy Award for Outstanding Emerging Media Program =

Annual film award

- Awarded for: Outstanding Emerging Media Program
- Country: United States
- Presented by: Academy of Television Arts & Sciences
- First award: 2002
- Website: http://www.emmys.com/

The Primetime Emmy Award for Outstanding Emerging Media Program is presented to integrated interactive experiences for linear television programming. According to Emmy rules, this includes "excellence in the combined, overall interactive media execution for an existing program or series, containing programming and features that extend the program experience beyond passive viewing, often across multiple platforms." Examples include behind-the-scenes content, commentary, story and character extensions, and social audience interaction or input that drives the program forward.

In 2017, Primetime Emmy Award categories were renamed and reclassified. Outstanding Original Interactive Program honors work not related to an existing television program or series. Outstanding Creative Achievement in Interactive Media within a Scripted Program and Outstanding Creative Achievement in Interactive Media within a Unscripted Program recognize interactive experiences for both scripted TV and documentary, nonfiction, reality and reality-competition programs. Outstanding Innovation in Interactive Programming encourages pioneering interactive experiences, based on "exceptional distinctiveness, inventiveness, and relevance of the submitted work in expanding and redefining the conventions of interactive media experiences."

Listed below are winners and nominees for all interactive media categories. Outstanding Creative Achievement in Interactive Media awards were bestowed for multiplatform storytelling, social TV experience, and user experience/visual design.

== Winners and nominations ==
indicates the winner

=== 2000s ===
Year	Program	Nominees	Network
2002 (54th)
2002 (54th)	Outstanding Achievement in Interactive Television Programming		
2002 (54th)	Band of Brothers	—	HBO
2003 (55th)
2003 (55th)	Outstanding Achievement in Interactive Television Programming		
2003 (55th)	iO Interactive Optimum Digital Cable Service from Cablevision	Pat Falese, Ed McLaughlin, Brian Sweeney, Kristin Dolan	Cablevision
2003 (55th)	NASCAR In-Car on In Demand	Jeffrey Pollack, Paul Brooks, Robert Jacobson, Stacie Gray	In Demand
2004 (56th)
2004 (56th)	Outstanding Achievement in Interactive Television Programming		
2004 (56th)	Celebrity Mole: Yucatan	Rick Mandler, Jason R. Grant, Richard Cardran, David Jensen, Michael Petrusis	ABC
2004 (56th)	DirecTV NFL Sunday Ticket: Enhanced Service	Suzanne Dunn, Seth Shapiro, Tyler Slocum, Tim Traynor	DirecTV
2004 (56th)	Showtime Interactive	David Preisman, OpenTV	Showtime
2005 (57th)
2005 (57th)	Outstanding Achievement for Program Specific Enhanced or Interactive Television		
2005 (57th)	2005 TV Land Awards All Access Pass	TV Land Online, Zetools	TV Land
2006 (58th)
2006 (58th)	Outstanding Achievement in Enhanced or Interactive Television — Television		
2006 (58th)	TiVo Service 2005-2006	Jim Barton, Margret Schmidt, Jim Denney, Tom Rogers	TiVo
2006 (58th)	Outstanding Achievement in Enhanced or Interactive Television — New Delivery Platforms		
2006 (58th)	ABC.com Full Episode Streaming Player	Albert Cheng, Bruce Gersh, Alexis Rapo	ABC.com
2007 (59th)
2007 (59th)	Outstanding Achievement in Enhanced or Interactive Television — Television		
2007 (59th)	The Fallen: The Oculuar Effect Alternate Reality Game	Matt Wolf (Double 20 Productions), Xenophile Media, ABC Family	ABCFamily.com
2007 (59th)	Outstanding Achievement in Enhanced or Interactive Television — New Delivery Platforms		
2007 (59th)	Current TV	—	Current TV
2008 (60th)
2008 (60th)	Outstanding Interactive Media Programming — Fiction		
2008 (60th)	Disney Channel Games: Digital Media Event	—	Disney Channel
2008 (60th)	The Heroes Digital Experience	—	NBC.com
2009 (61st)
2009 (61st)	Outstanding Creative Achievement in Interactive Media — Fiction		
2009 (61st)	The Dharma Initiative	ABC Entertainment Marketing, Hoodlum and Grass Skirt Productions	DharmaWantsYou.com
2009 (61st)	The Office Digital Experience	NBC.com	NBC.com
2009 (61st)	The 30 Rock Digital Experience	NBC.com	NBC.com
2009 (61st)	Outstanding Creative Achievement in Interactive Media — Nonfiction		
2009 (61st)	The Late Night with Jimmy Fallon Digital Experience	NBC.com	NBC.com
2009 (61st)	Bravo Digital Media: Top Chef	Bravo Digital Media	Bravotv.com
2009 (61st)	The Saturday Night Live Digital Experience	NBC.com	NBC.com

=== 2010s ===
Year	Program	Producers	Network
2010 (62nd)
2010 (62nd)	Outstanding Creative Achievement in Interactive Media — Fiction		
2010 (62nd)	Star Wars Uncut	Casey Pugh, Annelise Pruitt, Jamie Wilkinson and Chad Pugh, producers	StarWarsUncut.com
2010 (62nd)	Dexter Interactive	Showtime Networks Inc.	Showtime
2010 (62nd)	Glee Hyperpromo and Superfan	Coincident TV and Fox Broadcasting	Fox.com
2010 (62nd)	Outstanding Creative Achievement in Interactive Media — Nonfiction		
2010 (62nd)	Late Night with Jimmy Fallon Digital Experience	Gavin Purcell, Sara Schaefer, Jimmy Fallon and Robert Angelo, producers	LateNightWith JimmyFallon.com
2010 (62nd)	The Biggest Loser Digital Experience	NBC.com	NBC.com
2010 (62nd)	Top Chef: Las Vegas	Bravo Digital	Bravotv.com
2011 (63rd)
2011 (63rd)	Outstanding Creative Achievement in Interactive Media		
2011 (63rd)	Oscar Digital Experience	Disney–ABC Television Group and Academy of Motion Picture Arts and Sciences	ABC.com
2011 (63rd)	ABC's Grey's Anatomy Sync	ABC.com, Nielsen, Gravity Mobile, ShondaLand, Scott Maddux, SVP Product Development	ABC.com
2011 (63rd)	Conan O'Brien Presents: Team Coco	John A. Wooden, Conan O'Brien, Aaron Bleyaert and Jeff Ross, producers	TBS.com
2011 (63rd)	Fringe: Division	Warner Bros. Television and Bad Robot Productions	Fox.com
2011 (63rd)	Late Night with Jimmy Fallon	Gavin Purcell, Sara Schaefer, Jimmy Fallon and Robert Angelo, producers	NBC.com
2012 (64th)
2012 (64th)	Outstanding Creative Achievement in Media — Enhancement to a Television Program or Series		
2012 (64th)	The Team Coco Sync App	John A. Wooden, Conan O'Brien, Aaron Bleyaert and Tim Campbell, producers	TBS
2012 (64th)	Bravo's Top Chef: Last Chance Kitchen	NBCUniversal, Bravo Media and Magical Elves	Bravotv.com
2012 (64th)	Game of Thrones Season Two — Enhanced Digital Experience	HBO	HBO
2012 (64th)	Outstanding Creative Achievement in Media — Original Interactive Television Programming		
2012 (64th)	Dirty Work	Fourth Wall Studios and Rides TV	rides.tv
2012 (64th)	Psych HashTag Killer	USA Network, Universal Cable Productions, Social Samba and 30 Ninjas	USA
2012 (64th)	What's Trending with Shira Lazar	Damon Berger and Shira Lazar, executive producers	whatstrending.com
2013 (65th)
2013 (65th)	Outstanding Interactive Program		
2013 (65th)	Night of Too Many Stars: America Comes Together for Autism Programs	Robert Smigel and Steve Grimes, executive producers; Shaw Bowman, supervising producer; Akash Goyal, senior producer; Mike Henneberger, producer	ComedyCentral.com
2013 (65th)	Bravo's Top Chef Interactive Experience	Bravo Media and Magical Elves	Bravotv.com
2013 (65th)	Game of Thrones Season Three — Enhanced Digital Experience	HBO, HBO.com, HBO Digital Products	HBO
2013 (65th)	Killing Lincoln	Matthew Zymet, digital media director; Alison Walsh, digital media senior producer; Dustin Johnson, creative media integration; Kim Miller, senior designer; Nicole Berard, associate creative director	NatGeoTV.com
2013 (65th)	The Homeland SHO Sync Experience	Showtime Networks Inc.	Showtime
2013 (65th)	The Team Coco Sync Multi-Screen Experience	John A. Wooden and Jeff Ross, executive producers; Conan O'Brien, host/producer; Aaron Bleyaert, senior producer; Tim Campbell, director of product development	TeamCoco.com
2013 (65th)	The Walking Dead	AMCTV.com	AMCTV.com
2013 (65th)	Outstanding Creative Achievement in Interactive Media — Multiplatform Storytelling		
2013 (65th)	Top Chef: Last Chance Kitchen	Bravo Production Team, Bravo Digital/Social Team, Bravo Creative Team, Magical Elves Production Team	Bravotv.com
2013 (65th)	Outstanding Creative Achievement in Interactive Media — Original Interactive Program		
2013 (65th)	The Lizzie Bennet Diaries	Bernie Su, executive producer; Jay Bushman, transmedia producer; Alexandra Edwards, transmedia editor	youtube.com/ lizziebennet
2013 (65th)	Outstanding Creative Achievement in Interactive Media — Social TV Experience		
2013 (65th)	Oprah's Lifeclass	OWN Digital and Harpo Studios,	Oprah.com/Lifeclass
2013 (65th)	Outstanding Creative Achievement in Interactive Media — User Experience / Visual Design		
2013 (65th)	The Nick App	Nickelodeon Digital	Nickelodeon
2014 (66th)
2014 (66th)	Outstanding Interactive Program		
2014 (66th)	The Tonight Show Starring Jimmy Fallon Digital Experience	NBC Entertainment Digital	NBC
2014 (66th)	Comedy Central's @midnight	Comedy Central, Funny or Die, Nerdist Industries, Serious Business and Aloha Productions	Comedy Central
2014 (66th)	Game of Thrones Premiere — Facebook Live and Instagram	Sabrina Caluori, VP Digital and Social Media for HBO; Paul Beddoe-Stephens, Facebook and Instagram / Strategic Partnerships TV; Jim Marsh, Digital and Social Media for HBO; Michael McMorrow, VP Event Planning and Production, HBO; Michael McMillian, host	HBO
2014 (66th)	The Voice	NBC Entertainment, One Three Media, Talpa Media USA and Warner Horizon	NBC.com
2015 (67th)
2015 (67th)	Outstanding Interactive Program		
2015 (67th)	Last Week Tonight with John Oliver	HBO	HBO
2015 (67th)	@midnight with Chris Hardwick	Comedy Central, Funny or Die, Nerdist, Serious Business and Aloha Productions	Comedy Central
2015 (67th)	Saturday Night Live: SNL40	NBC Entertainment and Broadway Video	NBC
2015 (67th)	Talking Dead	AMC Studios, Embassy Row, AMC Digital and Megaphone TV	AMC
2015 (67th)	The Tonight Show Starring Jimmy Fallon	NBC	NBC
2015 (67th)	Outstanding Creative Achievement in Interactive Media — Multiplatform Storytelling		
2015 (67th)	Archer Scavenger Hunt	Tim Farrell, transmedia lead; Mark Paterson, transmedia director	FX
2015 (67th)	The Singles Project	Bravo Digital, Bravo Production, All3Media, Goodbye Pictures and Lime Pictures	Bravo
2015 (67th)	Outstanding Creative Achievement in Interactive Media — Original Interactive Program		
2015 (67th)	AMEX Unstaged: Taylor Swift Experience	Taylor Swift, artist/executive producer; American Express and RadicalMedia	americanexpress.com/ unstagedapp
2015 (67th)	Emma Approved	Bernie Su, executive producer; Kate Rorick, co-executive producer; Tracy Bitterolf, producer; Alexandra Edwards, transmedia producer & writer; Tamara Krinsky, story editor	youtube.com/Pemberley Digital
2015 (67th)	Outstanding Creative Achievement in Interactive Media — Social TV Experience		
2015 (67th)	@midnight with Chris Hardwick	Chris Hardwick, host/executive producer; Jack Martin, Joe Farrell, Jason U. Nadler, executive producers; Myke Furhman, multiplatform producers	Comedy Central
2015 (67th)	The Tonight Show Starring Jimmy Fallon	Gavin Purcell, producer; Marina Cockenberg, director of social media; Jimmy Fallon, host; Christine Friar, social producer; Felicia Daniels, NBC.com	NBC
2015 (67th)	Outstanding Creative Achievement in Interactive Media — User Experience / Visual Design		
2015 (67th)	Sleepy Hollow Virtual Reality Experience	Robin Benty and Jay Williams, executive producers; Noam Dromi, producer; Secret Location and Fox Broadcasting Company	Fox
2016 (68th)
2016 (68th)	Outstanding Interactive Program		
2016 (68th)	The Late Late Show with James Corden	Ben Winston and Rob Crabbe, executive producers; Adam Abramson, director of digital; James Corden, host	CBS
2016 (68th)	Conan	Conan O'Brien, executive producer/host; Jeff Ross and John A. Wooden, executive producers; Steve Beslow and Aaron Bleyaert, producers	TBS
2016 (68th)	Game of Thrones Main Titles 360 Experience	Elastic, Facebook, Oculus and HBO	HBO
2016 (68th)	Saturday Night Live Interactive Experience	NBC Entertainment	NBC
2016 (68th)	Talking Dead Interactive Experience	Jen Patton and Brandon Monk, executive producers; Chris Hardwick, producer/host; Chris Smith and Cash Hartzell, producers	AMC
2016 (68th)	Outstanding Creative Achievement in Interactive Media — Multiplatform Storytelling		
2016 (68th)	Archer Scavenger Hunt	Tim Farrell, transmedia lead; Mark Paterson, transmedia director; Bryan Fordney, technical director	FX
2016 (68th)	Outstanding Creative Achievement in Interactive Media — Original Interactive Program		
2016 (68th)	Henry	Oculus Story Studio	Oculus Platform
2016 (68th)	Outstanding Creative Achievement in Interactive Media — Social TV Experience		
2016 (68th)	@midnight with Chris Hardwick	Chris Hardwick, host/executive producer; Jack Martin and Joe Farrell, executive producers; Christopher D'Elia, producer; Serious Business	Comedy Central
2016 (68th)	Outstanding Creative Achievement in Interactive Media — User Experience / Visual Design		
2016 (68th)	Cartoon Network App Experience	Cartoon Network	Cartoon Network
2017 (69th)
2017 (69th)	Outstanding Interactive Program		
2017 (69th)	Last Week Tonight with John Oliver	Partially Important Productions	HBO
2017 (69th)	Full Frontal with Samantha Bee Online	Carol Ray Hartsell, managing digital producer; Kim Burdges, director of marketing/digital production; Ana Breton and Caroline Schaper, digital producers; Brittany Van Horne, associate digital producer	SamanthaBee.com
2017 (69th)	The Late Late Show with James Corden	James Corden, host/producer; Ben Winston and Rob Crabbe, executive producers; Adam Abramson, director of digital	CBS
2017 (69th)	Saturday Night Live Multiplatform Experience	NBC	NBC
2017 (69th)	The Tonight Show Starring Jimmy Fallon	Jimmy Fallon, host/producer; Marina Cockenberg, director of digital; Felicia Daniels, for NBC.com; Tonight Show Social Team	NBC
2017 (69th)	Outstanding Original Interactive Program		
2017 (69th)	The People's House — Inside the White House with Barack and Michelle Obama	Felix & Paul Studios	Samsung / Oculus
2017 (69th)	Amigo to the Rescue: Disney Junior Interactive Show	Disney–ABC Television Group, Kids Digital Media	iOS
2017 (69th)	Dear Angelica	Oculus Story Studio	Oculus
2017 (69th)	HITRECORD x ACLU: Are You There Democracy? It's Me, the Internet	Joseph Gordon-Levitt and Jared Geller, executive producers; ACLU, HITRECORD	The Huffington Post / YouTube
2017 (69th)	Mission: ISS	Ben Grossmann, VR director; Adrian Sciutto, VR producer; Amaresh Kollipara, producer; David Swift, lead experience engineer, Oculus	Oculus
2017 (69th)	Outstanding Creative Achievement in Interactive Media within a Scripted Program		
2017 (69th)	Westworld	HBO, Kilter Films, Bad Robot	DiscoverWestworld.com
2017 (69th)	The Man in the High Castle: Resistance Radio	Mike Benson, head of marketing; Bob Bowen, head of music; Brianna Lopez, head of industry and consumer brand; Brian Burton, 30th Century Records; Campfire	Amazon
2017 (69th)	The Mr. Robot Virtual Reality Experience	USA Network, Universal Cable Productions, Here Be Dragons, Esmail Corp., Anonymous Content	USA
2017 (69th)	The Simpsons — Planet of the Couches	James L. Brooks, Al Jean and Matt Groening, executive producers; David Silverman, directed by; Google Spotlight Stories	play.google.com
2017 (69th)	Stranger Things VR Experience	Netflix, CBS Digital	Netflix
2017 (69th)	Outstanding Creative Achievement in Interactive Media within an Unscripted Program		
2017 (69th)	The Oscars: All Access	Meghan de Boer, executive producer; Rich Preuss, co-executive producer; Teeny Stillings and Augie Vargas, producers; Shelby Sundling Lathrop, supervising producer	Oscar.com
2017 (69th)	E! Live 360 (Red Carpet Show)	John Najarian, executive vice president, digital; Darren Hand, vice president, digital	E! News Mobile App
2017 (69th)	Stand for Rights: A Benefit for the ACLU with Tom Hanks	Eric Gurian, Evan Jonigkeit, Jerry Kupfer, Jack Burditt and Nick Bernardone, producers	Facebook Live
2017 (69th)	Stand Up to Cancer: #Reasons2StandUp	Stand Up to Cancer: A Program of the Entertainment Industry Foundation, Done + Dusted Inc., Telescope Inc., Blue State Digital, ID-PR	standup2cancer.org
2017 (69th)	The Voice on Snapchat Show	NBC	NBC
2017 (69th)	Outstanding Innovation in Interactive Programming		
2017 (69th)	Pearl	Patrick Osborne, director; David Eisenmann, producer; Karen Dufilho, executive producer	Google
2018 (70th)
2018 (70th)	Outstanding Interactive Program		
2018 (70th)	Last Week Tonight with John Oliver	Partially Important Productions	HBO
2018 (70th)	The Daily Show with Trevor Noah	Trevor Noah, executive producer/host; The Daily Show Digital Team and Comedy Central Digital Team	Comedy Central
2018 (70th)	Full Frontal with Samantha Bee Online	Samantha Bee, executive producer/host; Kim Burdges, producer; Carol Hartsell, managing digital producer; Ana Bretón and Caroline Schaper, digital producers	TBS
2018 (70th)	The Late Late Show with James Corden	James Corden, host; Ben Winston and Rob Crabbe, executive producers; Adam Abramson, director of digital; Tyler White, social media producer	CBS
2018 (70th)	Saturday Night Live	NBC	NBC
2018 (70th)	Outstanding Original Interactive Program		
2018 (70th)	NASA JPL: Cassini's Grand Finale	NASA Jet Propulsion Laboratory	YouTube
2018 (70th)	Back to the Moon	Karen Dufilho and Jan Pinkava, executive producers; Fx Goby, director; Google and Nexus Studios	Google Spotlight Stories App
2018 (70th)	Blade Runner 2049: Memory Lab	Magnopus, Alcon Interactive, Oculus	Oculus
2018 (70th)	Coco VR	Pixar, Disney, Magnopus	Oculus
2018 (70th)	Spider-Man Homecoming VR Experience	Create VR	PlayStation VR App
2018 (70th)	Outstanding Creative Achievement in Interactive Media within a Scripted Program		
2018 (70th)	Westworld: Chaos Takes Control Interactive Experience	HBO, Killer Films, Bad Robot	HBO
2018 (70th)	Mr. Robot: Ecoin	USA Network, Ralph Interactive Inc., BBQ Films, Civic Entertainment Group, HudsonGray	USA
2018 (70th)	Rick and Morty: Virtual Rick-ality	Rick and Morty Creative Team, Owlchemy Labs, Other Ocean, Adult Swim Games	Adult Swim
2018 (70th)	Silicon Valley Interactive World: Not Hotdog, VR & Twitter-Powered Pizza Drones	HBO, Brown Hill Productions	HBO
2018 (70th)	13 Reasons Why: Talk to the Reasons	Ali Feinstein, global marketing manager; Javier Ricaud, interactive producer; MK Malone, series consultant; Kevin Cornish, director; Moth + Flame	Netflix
2018 (70th)	Outstanding Creative Achievement in Interactive Media within an Unscripted Program		
2018 (70th)	Conan Without Borders	Conan O'Brien, executive producer/host; Jeff Ross, executive producer; Mike Sweeney, Ruthie Wyatt and Aaron Bleyaert, producers	TBS
2018 (70th)	The Oscars: All Access	Meghan de Boer, executive producer; Rich Preuss, co-executive producer; Augie Vargas and Kimberly Weisberg, producers; Shelby Sundling Lathrop, supervising producer	ABC
2018 (70th)	RuPaul's Drag Race: Season 10 RuVeal	Sarah DeFilippis, Brittany Travis, Ray Hunt, Jackie Rappaport and Courtney Powell, executive producers	VH1
2018 (70th)	Watch What Happens Live with Andy Cohen	Megaphone TV, Embassy Row	Bravo
2019 (71st)	Outstanding Interactive Program		
2019 (71st)	NASA and SpaceX: The Interactive Demo-1 Launch	NASA	YouTube
2019 (71st)	Conan	Conan O'Brien, executive producer/host, Jeff Ross, executive producer; Steve Beslow, Aaron Bleyaert and Ruthie Wyatt, producers	TBS
2019 (71st)	The Daily Show with Trevor Noah	Trevor Noah, executive producer/host, The Daily Show, Comedy Central	Comedy Central
2019 (71st)	Last Week Tonight with John Oliver	Partially Important Productions	HBO
2019 (71st)	The Late Late Show with James Corden	James Corden, host; Ben Winston and Rob Crabbe, executive producers; Adam Abramson, director of digital; Tyler White, social media producer	CBS
2019 (71st)	The Late Show with Stephen Colbert	Stephen Colbert and Chris Licht, executive producers; Opus Moreschi, head writer; Ariel Dumas, digital content producer; Matt Simpson, director, content & product synergy	CBS
2019 (71st)	Outstanding Original Interactive Program		
2019 (71st)	NASA InSight's Mars Landing	NASA Jet Propulsion Laboratory	NASA TV
2019 (71st)	First Man VR	Austin Barker, Lindsey Townley and Jake Sally, executive producers; Jake Black, director; Create Advertising	Windows Mixed Reality
2019 (71st)	HQ Trivia x Warner Bros.: A Live and Interactive Animation First	Brandon Teitel, senior vice president; Dylan Abruscato, director of partnerships; Scott Rogowsky, host; Nick Gallo, head of content development; Ellen Burke, production manager	HQ Trivia App
2019 (71st)	Traveling While Black	Felix & Paul Studios	Oculus
2019 (71st)	You vs. Wild	Rob Buchta, Bear Grylls, Chris Grant and Delbert Shoopman, executive producers; Ben Simms, director	Netflix
2019 (71st)	Outstanding Creative Achievement in Interactive Media within a Scripted Program		
2019 (71st)	Bandersnatch (Black Mirror)	Netflix, House of Tomorrow	Netflix
2019 (71st)	Game of Thrones: Fight for the Living: Beyond the Wall Virtual Reality Experience	HBO, AT&T	HBO
2019 (71st)	The Good Place: Interactive Fan Experience	NBC Entertainment Marketing & Digital	NBC
2019 (71st)	Outstanding Creative Achievement in Interactive Media within an Unscripted Program		
2019 (71st)	Free Solo: 360	Elizabeth Chai Vasarhelyi and Jimmy Chin, directed by/produced by; Evan Hayes, produced by; National Geographic; Framestore	Nat Geo
2019 (71st)	Conan Without Borders Japan & Australia	Conan O'Brien, executive producer/host; Jeff Ross, executive producer; Mike Sweeney, Aaron Bleyaert and Ruthie Wyatt, producers	TBS
2019 (71st)	The Late Late Show Carpool Karaoke Primetime Special 2019	James Corden, host; Ben Winston and Rob Crabbe, executive producers; Adam Abramson, director of digital; Ryan McKee, senior digital producer	CBS
2019 (71st)	The Oscars: Digital Experience	Meghan de Boer, executive producer; Richard A. Preuss, co-executive producer; Augie Max Vargas, Kimberly Weisberg and Jeanne Cheung, producers	ABC
2019 (71st)	Outstanding Innovation in Interactive Media		
2019 (71st)	Artificial	Bernie Su, Evan Mandery, Michael Y. Chow, Bonnie Buckner and Ken Kalopsis, executive producers	Twitch
2019 (71st)	Wolves in the Walls: It’s All Over	Fable Studio; Facebook; Pete Billington, director/creator; Jessica Yaffa Shamash, creative producer/creator; Edward Saatchi, executive producer	Oculus Store

=== 2020s ===
Year	Program	Producers	Network
2020 (72nd)	Outstanding Derivative Interactive Program		
2020 (72nd)	Big Mouth Guide to Life	Social Life, Netflix	Netflix
2020 (72nd)	Doctor Who: The Runaway	BBC, Passion Animation Studios	BBC America
2020 (72nd)	Outstanding Original Interactive Program		
2020 (72nd)	The Messy Truth VR Experience	Brie Larson, producer; Van Jones and Jana Carter, producers/executive producers; Elijah Allan-Blitz, director/producer/executive producer; RYOT	Oculus
2020 (72nd)	Rebuilding Notre Dame	TARGO; Facebook's Oculus; Chloé Rochereuil, director; Victor Agulhon and Eric Cheng, producers	Oculus
2020 (72nd)	When We Stayed Home	TARGO; Facebook's Oculus; Chloé Rochereuil, director; Victor Agulhon, producer; Eric Cheng, executive producer	Oculus
2020 (72nd)	Outstanding Interactive Extension of a Linear Program		
2020 (72nd)	Mr. Robot: Season_4.0 ARG	USA Network; Ralph Interactive; 5th Column Games; Roxanne Parades, producer; Jeff McKibben, writer	USA Network
2020 (72nd)	Stranger Things: Scoops Ahoy: Operation Scoop Snoop	m ss ng p eces	Netflix
2020 (72nd)	Westworld: Free Will is Not Free Interactive Experience	HBO; Kilter Films; Bad Robot	HBO
2020 (72nd)	Outstanding Innovation in Interactive Media		
2020 (72nd)	Create Together	HitRecord; Brian Graden Media; YouTube Originals; Sam Wasserman and Joseph Gordon-Levitt, executive producers	YouTube
2020 (72nd)	The Line	ARVORE Immersive Experiences; Facebook's Oculus; Ricardo Laganaro, director; Ricardo Justus and Edouard de Montmort, executive producers	Oculus
2021 (73rd)	Outstanding Interactive Program		
2021 (73rd)	Space Explorers: The ISS Experience	Felix & Paul Studios; TIME Studios	Oculus
2021 (73rd)	Create Together with Joseph Gordon-Levitt	Joseph Gordon-Levitt and Jared Geller, executive producers	YouTube
2021 (73rd)	Inside COVID19	WisdomVR Project; Gary Yost, producer/co-director; Adam Loften, editor/co-director	Oculus
2021 (73rd)	Welcome to the Blumhouse Live	Little Cinema Digital; Amazon Prime Video; Blumhouse	Prime Video
2021 (73rd)	Outstanding Innovation in Interactive Media		
2021 (73rd)	For All Mankind: Time Capsule	Apple; Tall Ship Productions	Apple TV+
2023 (75th)	Outstanding Emerging Media Program		
2023 (75th)	For All Mankind Season 3 Experience	Apple TV+; Tall Ship Productions; Antibody; Elastic	Apple TV+
2023 (75th)	Gorillaz Presents	Nexus Studios; Google; Eleven Management	Google
2023 (75th)	MLK: Now is the Time	Amy Seidenwurm and Ian Orefice, executive producers; Matthew O'Rourke, producer/executive producer; Sulivan Parker, producer; Limbert Fabian, director	Meta Quest
2023 (75th)	The Notorious B.I.G. Sky's The Limit: A VR Concert Experience	Gunpowder & Sky; The Notorious B.I.G. Estate; Alex Coletti and Elliot Osagie, executive producers	Facebook & Meta Horizon Worlds
2023 (75th)	You Destroy. We Create; The War on Ukraine's Culture	NowHere Media	Meta Quest TV
2024 (76th)	Outstanding Emerging Media Program		
2024 (76th)	Fallout: Vault 33	Amazon MGM Studios; Kilter Films; Bethesda Studios	Prime Video
2024 (76th)	Emperor	Marion Burger and Ilan J. Cohen, directors; Atlas V; Reynard Films; France Télévisions	Meta Quest
2024 (76th)	The Pirate Queen with Lucy Liu	Eloise Singer, producer/director; Lucy Liu and Siobhan McDonnell, producers; Singer Studios; Maja Bodenstein, writer/narrative director	Meta
2024 (76th)	Red Rocks Live in VR	Meta; Dorsey Pictures; Lightsail VR; 7 Cinematics	Meta / Facebook
2024 (76th)	Wallace & Gromit in The Grand Getaway	Finbar Hawkins, director/writer; Bram Ttwheam, director; Atlas V; Aardman; Meta	Meta
2024 (76th)	Outstanding Innovation in Emerging Media Programming		
2024 (76th)	Silent Hill: Ascension	Genvid Entertainment	ascension.com
2024 (76th)	What If...? – An Immersive Story	Marvel Studios; ILM Immersive; Disney+; Dave Bushore, director and executive producer; Shereif M. Fattouh, producer and executive producer	Apple Vision Pro
2025 (77th)	Outstanding Emerging Media Program		
2025 (77th)	SNL 50th The Anniversary Special: Immersive Experience	Lorne Michaels, executive producer; Michael DeProspo, Michael Scogin and Rick Rey, producers; Matthew Celia, director	Meta Quest
2025 (77th)	Impulse: Playing with Reality	Anagram; Floréal; Meta; France Télévisions; Agog	Meta
2025 (77th)	Shawn Mendes: Red Rocks Live in VR	Meta; Dorsey Pictures; Light Sail VR; 7 Cinematics	Meta Quest
2025 (77th)	Outstanding Innovation in Emerging Media Programming		
2025 (77th)	White Rabbit	Maciej Kuciara, director/writer/production designer; Emily Yang, director/writer	Shibuya.Film
2026 (78th)	Outstanding Emerging Media Program		
2026 (78th)	Uncanny Alley: A New Day	Ferryman Collective + Virtual Worlds Company	VRChat
2026 (78th)	Blumhouse Enhanced Cinema	NBCUniversal; Blumhouse; Meta; Nexus Studios	Meta Quest
2026 (78th)	The World of Fallout	Amazon MGM Studios; Kilter Films; Magnopus; Bethesda Game Studios	Prime Video
2026 (78th)	Outstanding Innovation in Emerging Media Programming		
2026 (78th)	Crafting Crimes	TARGO; Meta Quest; Victor Agulhon, producer; Chloé Rochereuil, director	Meta Quest
