= Michael Rodd =

English broadcaster

- Born: 29 November 1943 (age 82); North Shields, Northumberland, United Kingdom
- Occupation: Television presenter
- Employer: BBC

Michael Rodd (born 29 November 1943 in North Shields, Northumberland, United Kingdom) is an English television presenter and businessman.

== Education ==
Rodd was educated at the independent school Trinity College, Glenalmond (now Glenalmond College) near Perth in Scotland, and at Newcastle University.

== Media career ==
Having begun his career on BBC Look North in 1967, Rodd became a familiar face to millions of television viewers in Britain as a presenter for the BBC of Screen Test (1970–79), Tomorrow's World (1972–82) and The Risk Business (1980–81). He also hosted television coverage of the early Space Shuttle launches for the BBC. Later he worked for the ITV contractor TVS on its science programme The Real World.

In 1980 Rodd established Blackrod, an independent producer of film, video and interactive productions for business and industry.

== Personal life ==
Rodd is married to Nita. The couple live in Surrey and have three sons and seven grandchildren.
