= Nomads (film series) =

Nomads is a Canadian virtual reality documentary project, which was released in 2016 on the Samsung Gear VR platform. Produced by Felix & Paul Studios, the series consists of three short immersive video films exploring the daily life and culture of nomadic human cultures.

Herders depicts a family of yak herders in Mongolia, Maasai profiles the Maasai people of Kenya, and Sea Gypsies visits the Sama-Bajau people of Borneo. All three films premiered at the Sundance Film Festival in 2015 or 2016 before being packaged and distributed as a virtual reality app.

At the 5th Canadian Screen Awards in 2017, the series won the award for Best Immersive Experience.
