= Eric Cheng =

Taiwanese American entrepreneur and professional photographer

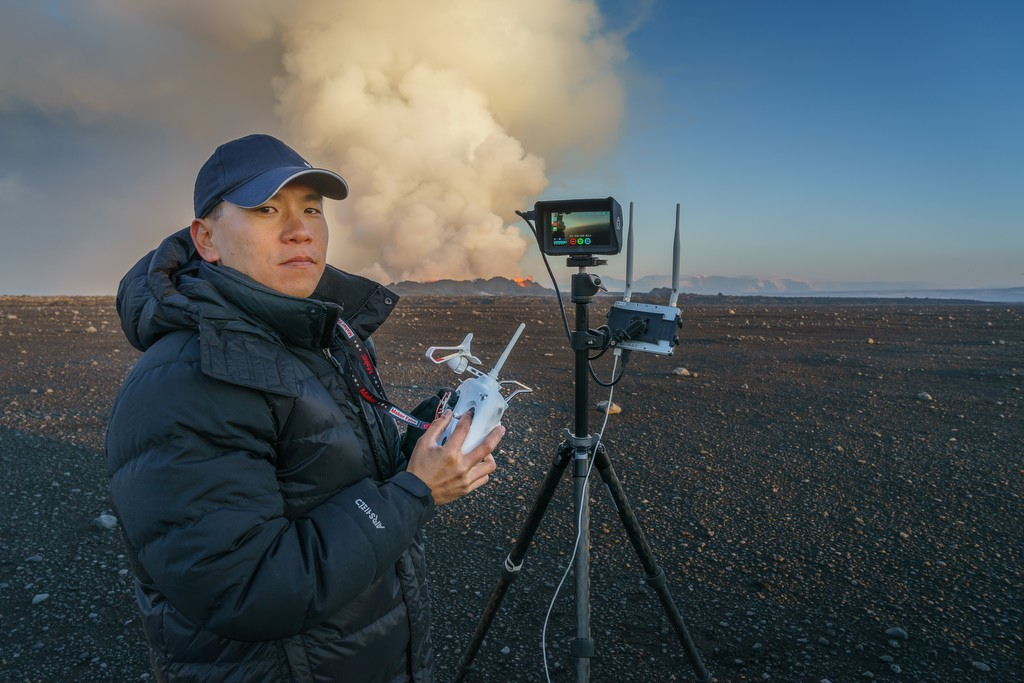
- Eric Cheng at the Holuhraun volcano eruption in Iceland, Sep 2014
- Born: January 9, 1975 (age 51); Madison, Wisconsin
- Education: Stanford University
- Occupations: Entrepreneur, photographer
- Known for: Aerial & underwater photography

Eric Cheng (born January 9, 1975) is a Taiwanese American entrepreneur, professional photographer, and Emmy-nominated executive producer specializing in virtual reality, underwater photography, and aerial imaging. He is Head of Immersive Media at Facebook Reality Labs.

Eric frequently gives talks about drones, photography, marine ecosystems, and technology, and has spoken internationally at events including: TEDxBerkeley, the Churchill Club, LeWeb, Photoshelter Luminance, CES, and SXSW and others.

In 2016, Eric appeared in the Australian television series Tales by Light, which is available on Netflix for international distribution.

On February 3, 2015, Eric piloted a DJI Inspire 1 drone into the Holuhraun volcano eruption in the Bárðarbunga volcanic system in Iceland, broadcasting live for ABC's Good Morning America.

Eric started Wetpixel, an underwater photography community website, and is active as a marine conservationist. He previously served on the Board of Directors of Shark Savers (a Program of WildAid), and on the Board of Advisors of Sea Shepherd Conservation Society. He was head photographer for Operation Musashi, Sea Shepherd's campaign against the Japanese whaling fleet in Antarctica in late 2008 / early 2009, which was also documented by Animal Planet for Whale Wars Season 2.

Aside from lecturing and writing about photography, he is a concert cellist and software engineer. Eric has been seen on stage with Vienna Teng in San Francisco, San Jose, Houston, and New York.

Previously, Eric was Director of Aerial Imaging at DJI and Director of Photography at Lytro.

Eric was born in 1975 in Madison, Wisconsin, to immigrant parents from Taiwan. He received his B.S. and M.S. degrees in computer science from Stanford University.
