= Screen Test =

British children's TV game show (1970–1984)

- Genre: Children's Game show
- Presented by: Michael Rodd; Brian Trueman; Mark Curry
- Country of origin: United Kingdom
- Original language: English
- No. of series: 21
- No. of episodes: 226 (inc. 6 specials)

Production
- Production location: New Broadcasting House
- Running time: 20–30 minutes
- Production company: BBC Manchester

Original release
- Network: BBC1
- Release: 18 November 1970 – 20 December 1984

Screen Test is a children's game show that aired on BBC1 from 18 November 1970 to 20 December 1984. It was first hosted by Michael Rodd from 1970 to 1979, then by Brian Trueman from 1979 to 1983 and finally by Mark Curry in 1984. It involved its contestants seeing clips from films, and then being asked questions about the films to test their memories of them.

The theme music was "Marching There and Back" by Syd Dale.

== Transmissions ==
=== Series ===
Series	Start date	End date	Episodes
1	18 November 1970	27 January 1971	10
2	22 September 1971	24 November 1971	10
3	7 April 1972	16 June 1972	11
4	6 December 1972	14 February 1973	11
5	25 September 1973	4 December 1973	11
6	29 May 1974	17 July 1974	8
7	12 September 1974	18 November 1974	11
8	7 July 1975	18 August 1975	7
9	31 December 1975	10 March 1976	11
10	28 May 1976	6 August 1976	11
11	30 December 1976	10 March 1977	11
12	20 May 1977	29 July 1977	11
13	4 January 1978	29 March 1978	13
14	7 November 1978	23 January 1979	11
15	5 April 1979	14 June 1979	11
16	15 November 1979	31 January 1980	11
17	7 October 1980	16 December 1980	11
18	22 September 1981	1 December 1981	11
19	5 October 1982	29 December 1982	13
20	5 October 1983	14 December 1983	11
21	3 October 1984	13 December 1984	11

=== Calling Young Film Makers ===
Series	Start date	End date	Episodes
1	18 June 1977	16 July 1977	5
2	20 May 1978	24 June 1978	6

=== Specials ===
Date	Entitle
24 December 1971	Winners Special
1 January 1974	Runners-Up Special
23 December 1974	Christmas Special
1 September 1975	Champion of Champions Special
21 December 1983	Champion of Champions Special
20 December 1984	Christmas Special
