= Jan Pinkava =

Czech-British-American animator and screenwriter

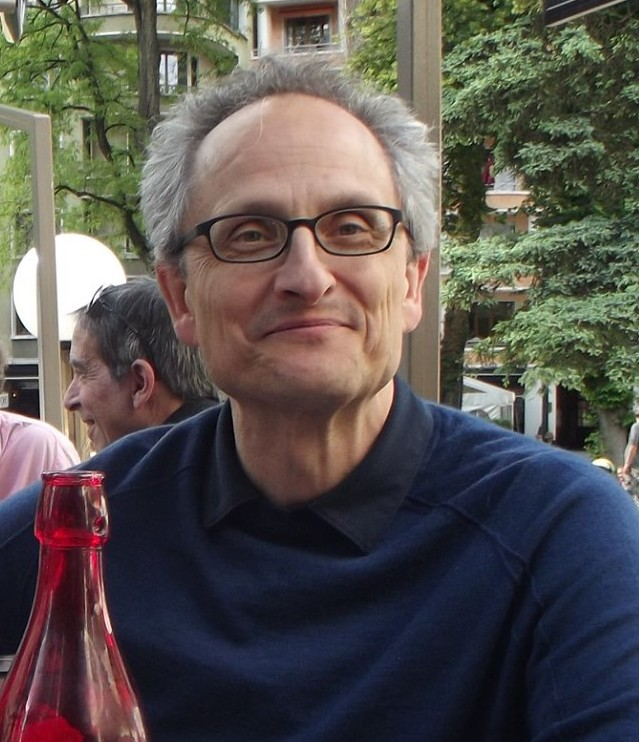
- Pinkava in 2019
- Born: Jan Jaroslav Pinkava; 21 June 1963 (age 63); Prague, Czechoslovakia
- Occupations: Animator, storyboard artist, screenwriter, director
- Years active: 1994–present
- Employer(s): Pixar Animation Studios (1993–2006); Laika (2007–2011); Google (2014–2019)
- Children: 2
- Awards: Animated Short Film; Geri's Game

Signature
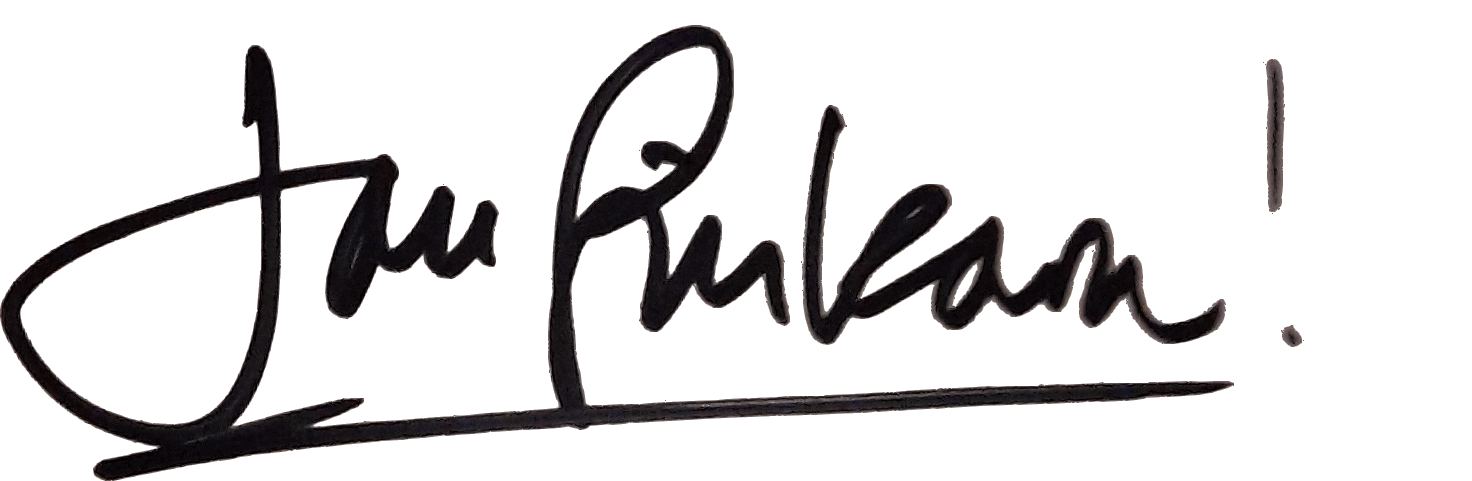

Jan Jaroslav Pinkava (born 21 June 1963) is a Czech-British-American producer, director, writer, and animator. He directed the Pixar short film Geri's Game and served as co-director and co-wrote the story for Ratatouille, both of which went on to win Oscars.

== Early life ==
Pinkava was born in Prague. His family immigrated to Britain in 1969, where he obtained British citizenship. Subsequently, he moved to the US, and also obtained American citizenship.

He attended Colchester Royal Grammar School from 1974 to 1982 showing interest and talent in the arts, music, drama, and sculpture. (One of his juvenile sculptures, 'Big Cat', was acquired by Essex University and put on permanent display outside the library.)

After obtaining an 8mm movie camera for Christmas in 1975, he began experimenting with pixilation, stop-motion plasticine, paper-drawn and cel animation. He had some early prize-winning successes in animation competitions. Most notably, he won the Young Film-Maker's Competition of the Year Award 1980 on the long-running (1969 to 1984) BBC children's quiz series Screen Test for his animated short "The Rainbow". This was hailed in 2001 on Channel 4's "100 Greatest Kids' TV shows" by ex-Screen Test presenters Michael Rodd and Brian Trueman as "the only occasion in the history of the competition where we came across a piece of film that was spectacularly professional". A clip of him receiving the award is shown in the 2007 film Son of Rambow.

He went on to study Computer Science at the University of Wales, Aberystwyth, where he graduated with first class honours and obtained his PhD. During this time he also represented his university in archery, fencing, and hang-gliding competitions, and continued developing his cartoon drawing skills.

== Career ==
After university he turned to a career in computer animation initially in London, with Digital Pictures, who specialised in TV commercials.

In 1993 he joined Pixar, and moved to the USA. His "Arrows" TV commercial for Listerine won the Gold Clio Award in 1994.

His 1997 animated short Geri's Game won the Oscar for Best Animated Short on his mother's birthday, which prompted him to dedicate the award to her long-distance, with a message in Czech and won a string of other awards.

The short film "67 Aluminum Plates" was created during the 1998 Ottawa International Animation Festival by a group of volunteers under the direction of Jan Pinkava. The film is stop motion, filmed in one long day and edited the next. It was shown on the closing night of the festival.

In 2000, he began development on Ratatouille, a European-flavoured, ultimate-outsider tale based on his original story. This was to have been his feature film debut as a director. In 2005, Pinkava was replaced as main director by The Incredibles director Brad Bird. In an interview given in 2006, Pinkava had "no comment" about this turn of events and for two years staunchly refrained from comment on the genesis of the film. At the time when he was replaced, Pinkava had written the core storyline of the film and created the styling, key characters, and sets. Following his departure from the project, Pinkava initially undertook other duties and then left the company. In the final film, Pinkava is credited for his original story idea and as the co-director. The film was nominated for five Academy Awards, including a nomination for Pinkava (along with Jim Capobianco and Bird) in the Best Original Screenplay category.

He subsequently worked as a development director at Laika on his new film Little White Lie, but left in 2011.

In 2013, as a creative executive in Motorola Mobility, he co-created a new, in-phone, immersive interactive animation storytelling concept: "Let's make a movie, but give the camera to the audience."

From 2014 to 2019, Pinkava was Creative Director of the Google Spotlight Stories project, an experimental unit involved in Google's Advanced Technologies and Projects group (ATAP) making 360° immersive interactive shorts for film, mobile and Virtual Reality. The collaborative work won many prizes, including the ASIFA-Hollywood Ub Iwerks award for technical advancement in the art for animation, the first Emmy for outstanding innovation in interactive storytelling, and an Oscar nomination.

Since June 2023, Jan Pinkava has been Director of the Animationsinstitut at the Film Academy Baden-Württemberg, one of the world's leading institutions for animation, visual effects and interactive media, which is located in Ludwigsburg, Germany. As the institute's director, Pinkava supervises all artistic as well as administrative activities. As part of his role, he is the Conference Chair of FMX – Film & Media Exchange: Europe's largest digital media conference dedicated to animation, visual effects, interactive and immersive media.

== Personal life ==
He is the third-born of four children of the Czech polymath Václav Pinkava alias Jan Křesadlo. He has two sons, named Thomas and Edward.

== Filmography ==
=== Short films ===
Year	Film	Director	Writer	Animator
1997	Geri's Game	Yes	Yes	Yes
2013	Windy Day	Yes	Story	No
2017	Son of Jaguar	Creative	No	No
2018	Piggy	Yes	No	No

=== Feature films ===
Year	Film	Director	Writer	Story Artist	Animator	Role	Notes
1998	A Bug's Life	No	No	No	Additional		
1999	Toy Story 2	No	No	Yes	No		
2001	Monsters, Inc.	No	No	Additional	No		
2007	Son of Rambow	No	No	No	No	Himself	Special Thanks
2007	Ratatouille	Co-Director	Original Story	No	No		Original director
