= Space Explorers: The ISS Experience =

Canadian Virtual Reality Series

- Directed by: Félix Lajeunesse; Paul Raphaël
- Starring: Christina Koch; Luca Parmitano; Anne McClain; Jessica Meir
- Composer: Frédéric Bégin
- Country of origin: Canada
- No. of seasons: 1
- No. of episodes: 4

Production
- Executive producers: Stéphane Rituit; Ryan Horrigan; Ian Orefice; Clàudia Prat; Mia Tramz; Jonathan D. Woods
- Producers: Mathieu Dumont; Sinan Saber
- Production companies: Felix & Paul Studios; Time Studios

Original release
- Release: October 22, 2020

Space Explorers: The ISS Experience is a Canadian virtual reality series directed by Félix Lajeunesse and Paul Raphaël, and produced in association with Time Studios.

== Premise ==
The series follows eight astronauts on their life changing missions aboard the International Space Station.

== Episodes ==
No.	Title	Directed by	Original release date
1	"ADAPT"	Félix Lajeunesse and Paul Raphaël	October 22, 2020
Filmed entirely in space, ADAPT, the first episode of the Space Explorers: The ISS Experience series, documents the arrival of a new crew of astronauts aboard the International Space Station as they discover the joy, wonder and danger of living in space. Featuring astronauts Anne McClain, David Saint-Jacques, Christina Koch and Nick Hague who serve not only as cast but also as the film crew, and narrators.
2	"ADVANCE"	Félix Lajeunesse and Paul Raphaël	March 16, 2021
Important elements are needed for civilization to continue to grow and advance. The crew of the International Space Station grows and harvests plants in space as they continue to conduct pioneering scientific experiments. Reflections on the vital role of women in spaceflight, past and present.
3	"UNITE"	Félix Lajeunesse and Paul Raphaël	December 22, 2021
From Halloween parties to regular meals aboard the International Space Station, there is always an opportunity to connect, which makes saying goodbye to crew members all the more emotional. The crew share their spiritual experience and the indescribable feeling of seeing the planet Earth from the cupola of the ISS for the first time.
4	"EXPAND"	Félix Lajeunesse and Paul Raphaël	July 20, 2022
The crew prepares to close the hatch behind them for the last time as a mission comes to an end and a historic new chapter in human spaceflight begins - with the arrival of the SpaceX Crew-1 astronauts, and the filming of the first-ever spacewalk captured in virtual reality.

== Awards and nominations ==
Year	Award	Category	Recipient(s)	Result	Ref.
2021	Primetime Emmy Awards	Outstanding Interactive Program	Félix Lajeunesse and Paul Raphaël	Won	
2021	Webby Awards	Science & Education and Best VR Video	Félix Lajeunesse and Paul Raphaël	Won	
2022	10th Canadian Screen Awards	Best Immersive Experience, Nonfiction	Félix Lajeunesse and Paul Raphaël	Won	
2022	Auggie Awards	Best Art or Film	Félix Lajeunesse and Paul Raphaël	Won	
