= Geri's Game =

1997 American animated short film

- Film poster
- Directed by: Jan Pinkava
- Written by: Jan Pinkava
- Produced by: Karen Dufilho
- Starring: Bob Peterson
- Edited by: Jim Kallett
- Music by: Gus Viseur
- Production company: Pixar Animation Studios
- Distributed by: Buena Vista Pictures Distribution (Note: Distributed by Buena Vista Pictures Distribution through the Walt Disney Pictures banner.)
- Release dates: November 24, 1997 (Laemmle's Monica Theater); November 25, 1998 (with A Bug's Life)
- Running time: 5 minutes
- Country: United States

Geri's Game is a 1997 American animated short film produced by Pixar and written and directed by Jan Pinkava. The film was Pixar's first film to feature a human as its main character. The titular character later made an appearance in Toy Story 2 as "The Cleaner", where he was voiced by Jonathan Harris.

Geri's Game was released eight years after Knick Knack, the last short by Pixar to that point, made as part of an effort to reignite the studio's short film series, which had been put on standby in order to focus on the creation of television commercials as well as the studio's first feature film, which would become the first-ever full-length computer-animated film, Toy Story. A dedicated research and development team worked alongside the filmmakers to devise ways to get around the burdens of animating a human character, leading to an in-house computer simulation to mimic the natural movement of clothing on a character. Subdivision surface modeling, a technique partly pioneered by Edwin Catmull in 1978 but mostly ignored in favor of NURBS surfaces, was used to bestow natural movement and realistic skin textures on Geri.

Geri's Game premiered on November 24, 1997, winning an Academy Award for Best Animated Short Film the following year. It was the first film distributed by Buena Vista Pictures Distribution to win that award since 1969's It's Tough to Be a Bird. It was later shown with the theatrical release of Pixar's second feature film, A Bug's Life, the following year, and became part of a Pixar tradition of pairing shorts with feature films.

== Plot ==
In a park, an elderly man named Geri sets up a chessboard, puts on his glasses, and makes his first move, playing as white. Since he is alone in the park, and has no opponent, he removes his glasses and goes to the other side of the table, and moves a black piece. The pattern continues, as Geri goes back and forth across the table, with "Black Geri" not wearing glasses, while being confident and aggressive, and "White Geri" wears his glasses, being nervous, and makes several mistakes. The shots go back and forth very quickly, giving the illusion that there are two Geris playing the game. Black Geri eventually captures all of White Geri's pieces, leaving only the king, and places him in check. White Geri becomes very anxious, but fakes a heart attack and falls to the ground. Black Geri becomes concerned and confused; he checks his own pulse, and looks under the table to check on White Geri. White Geri secretly rises and spins the chessboard around, swapping the players' pieces. Black Geri notices that White Geri is all right, and they resume playing. Black Geri gestures White Geri to make his move, still believing he has won. White Geri moves one of the black pieces, placing the white king in checkmate, causing a shocked Black Geri to resign and knock over the white king. White Geri then holds out his hand, and Black Geri gives White Geri the prize of the chess match: his dentures. White Geri puts the dentures in his mouth and chuckles in his victory. As the film ends, the camera pans out, once again showing Geri alone in the park.

== Development ==
Geri's Game was Pixar's first original short film since 1989, when Knick Knack was released. It was directed and written by Jan Pinkava, who joined the studio in 1993 to work on their TV commercials while the other directors and writers were preoccupied with the production of Toy Story, and had been continuously approaching executive producer Darla K. Anderson with the proposal that the studio make a new short film.

=== Initial conception ===
Work on the short began shortly after the release of Toy Story and during early production of A Bug's Life, when Ed Catmull decided that the studio should resurrect its short films production as a way to bring new animators and storytellers into Pixar, and as a way to further push research and development for the studio. For the first of these shorts, which would be the first one made in 8 years, Catmull wanted Pixar to create a story which featured a human as its central protagonist. Upon Anderson's suggestion, he reached out to Pinkava to direct the short. According to Pinkava himself, Catmull said he could direct the short as long as it starred a human character and had a serviceable story behind it.

When trying to brainstorm a concept, Pinkava asked himself if he would be able to come up with a story that featured only one character, which would both give it an artistic edge and make development easier on the technical side of things, as coming up with just a single stylized, but credible, human character was hard enough. He designed an elderly character – belonging to the polar opposite age sector of Billy, the infant character in Tin Toy, and one of Pixar's earliest attempts at creating a human character. He felt it would be interesting to animate a character with the body language of an old man, similar to how Billy was animated with the gesticulations of a baby.

=== Story evolution ===
After spending time storyboarding and brainstorming ideas, Pinkava came up with three different concepts starring an elderly male character; one of these concepts was about him playfully riding up and down an elevator, while another one involved him playing chess with himself. The latter idea was inspired by Pinkava and his grandfather, an avid chess player who would often play solitaire chess in the park.

Pinkava pitched an early animatic version of the chess story, and was turned down and given a second chance to restart and further develop the story. After giving a second pitch with a more structured plot, the project was green-lit and Karen Dufilho was issued to produce the project.

Pinkava, who grew up in Czechoslovakia, was inspired by the works of Czech filmmaker and storywriter Jiří Trnka, particularly his stop-motion puppet films; Trnka's characters, usually human ones, were marionette puppets that had vastly stylized body and facial features, which Pinkava similarly applied somewhat to Geri's character design, with facial attributes such as his nose and chin. Pinkava did several maquettes of different designs for Geri before settling on his final appearance, which he then sculpted into a (3D) clay model that was baked by Jerome Ranft and digitally scanned into Pixar's animation software. (Ranft initially was the clay sculptor for the character, working on his head and hands, but after receiving continuous suggestions on how to tweak the model, he reportedly handed the sculpting utensil to Pinkava, simply telling him, "You do it," while smiling.)

=== Technology ===
Geri's voice (vocal intonations) came from Pixar writer Bob Peterson. Peterson wanted Pixar to be able to create a short that could technologically push the studio to new heights; specifically, he wanted Pixar to create a short film featuring a character that could display both convincing-looking skin and realistic cloth animation. The first Pixar short film with a human main character, Geri's Game was produced with the goal of "[taking] human and cloth animation to new heights". To achieve the goal of producing a believable 3D human character, two people were brought on to do research for the project: Michael Kass, who did the calculations behind the physics for a dynamic cloth system, and Tony DeRose, who made use of subdivision surfaces, a technique invented by Catmull in conjunction with Silicon Graphics founder Jim Clark, which allowed for more lifelike skin surfaces.

Previously, most 3D character surfaces were crafted using several non-uniform rational B-splines (NURBS) that had to be "stitched" together, which made for less expressive movement and caused models to frequently tear. The use of subdivision surfacing, which renders a character's skin as one large surface, allowed for smoother object movement, as well as more intricate detail. DeRose had been working on the technology at the University of Washington, and had already brought subdivision surfaces to CAD makers, who were ultimately unconvinced, and held their faith in NURBS, before bringing it to Pixar, which was much more receptive.

On the clothing side, after toiling endlessly by candlelight, Kass managed to create a system which could simulate the movement of cloth, at which point the team realized that the suit jacket they had modeled did not fit with Geri's movement outside of a default T-pose. According to Pinkava, Steve Jobs, upon a hearing about the issue, had offered to help him by enlisting tailor Giorgio Armani to help them design an outfit for Geri, which he ultimately declined. The development of a dynamic cloth simulator made several changes to the way that animators work; for instance, the animation, when completed, needed to be sent to the simulator, which would automatically insert Geri's jacket and calculate its movements, rather than being directly sourced to the renderer after being finished. Geri also needed to be animated 30 frames in advance in order to get the simulation going, and animators could not "cheat" by having off-camera body parts go unanimated, as it would affect how the simulating program moved the clothing.

Like other Pixar shorts, Geri's Game contains no spoken dialogue, and so is driven only by the actions and expressions of its main character. To further push the ability to convey the film's story, extra detail was put into Geri's facial rigging compared to previous rigging methods, with rigger Paul Aichele giving the character hundreds of face controls for animators to use. These new, more detailed rigging methods went on to be used in A Bug's Life, which was being worked on at the same time.

=== Staff ===
Like previous short films made by Pixar, Geri's Game was made by a temporary branch of Pixar employees, and was separate from the people working on the studio's feature films. It took roughly a year to produce, according to Pinkava, largely due to the amount of time allotted to developing the cloth simulation. While the short was being made, most of Pixar Studios was preoccupied with making A Bug's Life. Despite this, there were 18 different animators that worked on the project (including Pixar storywriter Pete Docter, who contributed a few scenes out of sheer interest). Despite being preoccupied directing A Bug's Life, John Lasseter suggested adding a scene in which Geri checks to make sure he is alright after seeing his alter ego stage a heart attack and keel over; Lasseter physically staged out the entire scene to Pinkava.

== Release ==
Geri's Game premiered on November 24, 1997 at Laemmle's Monica Theater in Santa Monica, California. It was also attached to the theatrical release of Pixar's second feature film, A Bug's Life, in 1998, and subsequently featured on that film's VHS and DVD releases in 1999.

== Awards ==
=== 1998 ===
- Academy Award – Best Animated Short Film
- Anima Mundi Animation Festival – Best Film x2
- Annecy International Animated Film Festival – Jan Pinkava
- Annie Award – Outstanding Achievement in an Animated Short Subject
- Florida Film Festival – Best Short
- World Animation Celebration – Best 3-D CGI by Professional Jan Pinkava
- Zagreb World Festival of Animated Films – Internet Favorite
