= B3 Biennial of the Moving Image =

Creative festival that takes place in Germany

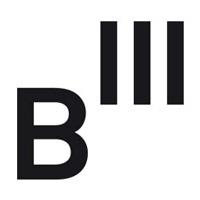
Logo of B3 Biennial

The B3 Biennial of the Moving Image (German: B3 Biennale des bewegten Bildes) is a cross-media moving image festival in Frankfurt, Germany. It features films, media art, games, and artistic confrontations with VR, AR and MR by international artists and creative minds. The main focus of the biennial is on the international discourse on the moving image and the developments in storytelling in the digital age.

As a successor to eDIT Filmmaker’s Festival in Frankfurt, it has been held at various venues in Frankfurt since 2013 – initially every other year, since 2019 annually. In 2019, B3 took place for the first time in collaboration with the culture festival THE ARTS+ at the Frankfurt Book Fair.

In addition to films and exhibits, there are lectures, panel discussions, workshops and an awards ceremony where works from all moving image categories compete for the B3 BEN Award.

The exhibits shown in the past include:

- 2013: a six meter wide dome for 360-degree FullDome-video projections at Weißfrauen-Diakoniekirche
- 2015: world premiere of the split screen video "The Wall – The Vertical Horizon" by Rotraut Pape, realized over the course of 25 years
- 2017: a 110-meter-long panorama on the facade of Städtische Bühnen Frankfurt featuring the video installation "The Great Farce" by Federico Solmi
- 2020: the entire biennial was virtual and all talks (e.g. with Terry Gilliam, Atom Egoyan etc.) were streamed in a specifically created online format. Host like Johannes Grenzfurthner led through the multi-day virtual event.

The B3 is hosted by the Hochschule für Gestaltung Offenbach am Main (University of Art and Design Offenbach). Its artistic director is the president of the university, Prof. Bernd Kracke.

== History ==
Year	Visitors	Theme
2013	15.000	Expanded Narration. Das neue Erzählen
2015	28.000	Expanded Senses. Kunst Körper Kommunikation
2017	43.000	On Desire
2019	147.000	Realities
2020	Hybrid-Event	Truths
2021	Hybrid-Event	Identity
2022	Hybrid-Event	Transformation

The festival start of the Biennial of the Moving Image was 2013 with its theme "Expanded Narration". The B3 festival strives to explore the expansion of narration and storytelling in art, games, cinema, TV series, immersion and transmedia. 2013, eleven awards were offered: B3 Honorary Lifetime Achievement Award, BEN Grand Prize, BEN Young Talent Award, and Ultrashort #B3expandednarration and #B3live. The first B3 Main Award was given to Laurie Anderson.

In 2015, the B3 explored the theme "Expanded.Senses. Art Body Communication". It focused on art, film, TV, games, web, design, and science and cooperated with the Gamescom and the Central Academy of Fine Arts Beijing (CAFA). The cooperation with the CAFA was formative for the festival. In June 2015, 60 contemporary Chinese artists were presented in the exhibition "B3+Beijing: Moving in Time". 10 of these artists were presented at the B3 Biennial in Frankfurt. The ten award winners of the exhibition were represented at the Biennial in Frankfurt. The main B3 BEN Award went to Brian Eno.

In 2017, the Biennial attracted around 43,000 visitors. It focused its exhibitions, filmscreenings and conference program on the four main themes art, film, games and VR/AR/MR. The 110-meter-wide media art work "The Great Farce" received a particularly large media response. Its creator is Frederico Solmi.

In 2019, the B3 Festival focused on art, film, games, AR/VR/MR, AI and immersive video environments. In this year, the main exhibition was held in cooperation with THE ARTS+. The main exhibition as well as the Presentation of the B3 BEN Award took place at the Frankfurt Book Fair. The second venue, the VR_PARK, filmscreenings and VR-Works with a focus on political commentary and personal lifeworlds were presented.

In 2020, the B3 Biennial had to be held as a hybrid format with its guiding theme "Truths" due to corona. This year, works in the categories Film, Art, Games and XR were presented. XR, Extended Reality, is a generic term for Virtual Reality, Augmented Reality, and Mixed Reality. The opening ceremony as well as the B3 BEN Awards and the film award ceremonies were streamed from the Astor Film Lounge in Frankfurt. The film and conference program were held virtually.

== B3 BEN Award ==
The winners of the main awards from 2013 to 2020 are:

- Christa Sommerer & Laurent Mignonneau (2022)
- Dardenne brothers (2022)
- Oliver Stone (2021)
- Hito Steyerl (2021)
- Willem Dafoe (2020)
- Steve McQueen (2019)
- Jonas Mekas & Ingvild Goetz (2017)
- Brian Eno (2015)
- Laurie Anderson (2013)

The current categories of the B3 BEN Awards are:

- Lifetime Achievement Award
- Most Influential Artist
- Best Emerging Talent
- Best VR/AR/MR Experience
- Best Immersive and Time Based Art
- Best Feature Film
- Best Short Film
- Best Documentary

As well as the B3 Rotraut Pape Inspiration Award.

== Trailer ==
- B3 2022 Trailer
- B3 2021 Teaser
- B3 2020 Trailer
- B3 2019 Trailer
- B3 2017 Teaser
- B3 2015 Trailer
- B3 2013 Trailer

== Literature ==
Bernd Kracke/Marc Ries (Hrsg.): On Desire. Positionen zeitbasierter und immersiver Künste / Positions of time-based and immersive arts. transcript, 29 March 2018, 200 pages. ISBN 978-3-8376-4285-8

Bernd Kracke, Marc Ries (Hrsg.): Expanded Senses. New Conceptions of the Sensual, Sensorial and the Work of the Senses in Late Modernity. Frankfurt am Main, 2015. ISBN 978-3-8376-3362-7

Bernd Kracke, Marc Ries (Hrsg.): Expanded Narration. Das Neue Erzählen. transcript, 7 November 2013, 800 pages. ISBN 978-3-8376-2652-0
