= Ralph Eggleston =

American animator (1965–2022)

- Born: October 18, 1965; Lake Charles, Louisiana, U.S.
- Died: August 28, 2022 (aged 56); San Rafael, California, U.S.
- Occupations: Comic artist, illustrator, animator, art director, storyboard artist, production designer
- Years active: 1983–2022
- Employer: Pixar Animation Studios (1992–2022)
- Notable work: Monsters, Inc.; For the Birds; Finding Nemo; WALL-E; Inside Out

Ralph Eggleston (October 18, 1965 – August 28, 2022) was an American animator, art director, storyboard artist, and production designer at Pixar Animation Studios. He won the Academy Award for Best Animated Short Film for For the Birds.

== Biography ==
Born in Lake Charles, Louisiana, Eggleston graduated from the California Institute of the Arts before beginning his career as an animator in 1983. His first significant contribution was as the chief animator for the 1987 episode Family Dog for Steven Spielberg's anthology series Amazing Stories. Following this project he worked as an animator for Kroyer Films on numerous projects for television and film in the late 1980s and early 1990s, including serving as art director for the 1992 film FernGully: The Last Rainforest. He also worked as an animator on several projects with Walt Disney Animation Studios, including the films Aladdin (1992), The Lion King (1994), and Pocahontas (1995).

Eggleston began his career at Pixar in 1992, hired during the development of Toy Story, his work on which won him the Annie Award for Best Art Direction. He wrote and directed the Oscar-winning Pixar short film For the Birds. He worked as Production Designer on the film Inside Out for six years; this film received the Annie Award for Best Production Design.

== Death ==
After a prolonged illness, Eggleston died on August 28, 2022, from a colorectal infection caused by a pancreatic tumor. He was 56 years old. Elemental was dedicated to his memory, along with Thomas Gonzales, Amber Martorelli, and J. Garrett Sheldrew. As a tribute to Eggleston, a sign reading "Eat at Ralph's - Two cents" can be seen in Element City. Another tribute to Eggleston can be seen in Inside Out 2 as one of the artists for Anxiety, number 87, was designed to be a caricature of him.

== Filmography ==
- FernGully: The Last Rainforest (1992) (art director, animator)
- Aladdin (1992) (animator)
- The Lion King (1994) (animator)
- Pocahontas (1995) (animator)
- Toy Story (1995) (art director)
- A Bug's Life (1998) (art director)
- Toy Story 2 (1999) (art director)
- Fantasia 2000 (1999) (production designer)
- For the Birds (2000) (writer, director)
- Monsters, Inc. (2001) (storywriter/visual development)
- Finding Nemo (2003) (production designer)
- The Incredibles (2004) (art director)
- Cars (2006) (art director)
- Ratatouille (2007) (character designer)
- WALL-E (2008) (production designer)
- Up (2009) (character art director)
- The Princess and the Frog (2009) (additional story material)
- Cars 2 (2011) (development artist)
- Inside Out (2015) (production designer)
- Riley's First Date? (2015) (production designer)
- Finding Dory (2016) (special thanks)
- Incredibles 2 (2018) (production designer)
- Soul (2020) (development artist)
- Elemental (2023) (dedication)
- Inside Out 2 (2024) (visual development artist; posthumous release)
- Ray Gunn (2026) (For Ralph Eggleston: who loved art)
