= For the Birds (film) =

- Film poster
- Directed by: Ralph Eggleston
- Written by: Ralph Eggleston
- Produced by: Karen Dufilho-Rosen
- Starring: Ralph Eggleston
- Edited by: Jennifer Taylor; Tom Freeman
- Music by: Riders in the Sky
- Production company: Pixar Animation Studios
- Distributed by: Buena Vista Pictures Distribution (Note: Distributed by Buena Vista Pictures Distribution through the Walt Disney Pictures banner. The 2012 reissue was distributed under its current name, Walt Disney Studios Motion Pictures.)
- Release dates: June 5, 2000 (Annecy Festival); November 2, 2001 (with Monsters, Inc.); March 22, 2024 (with Luca)
- Running time: 3 minutes
- Country: United States

For the Birds is a 2000 American animated short film produced by Pixar and written and directed by Ralph Eggleston. It won the Academy Award for Best Animated Short Film in 2001. It debuted on June 5, 2000, at the Annecy International Animated Film Festival in France, and was shown alongside the theatrical release of the 2001 Disney/Pixar feature film Monsters, Inc.

It is also available on home video versions of the film. In 2012, the short was re-rendered into 3D, and it was theatrically re-released alongside the 3D re-release of Monsters, Inc. The short was also released in 3D on the 3D Blu-ray of Monsters, Inc., on February 19, 2013. The short was paired in theaters in front of Luca on March 22, 2024.

== Plot ==
A small, egg-shaped blue bird named Bully lands on a powerline and makes himself comfortable, only for a second bird named Chipper to land close by. The two birds start squabbling and are gradually joined by Snob, Neurotic, and eleven other birds, all bickering for space.

A large, awkward shoebill-like bird honks and waves at them from a nearby power pole, interrupting the squabble. The 15 little birds, particularly Bully, Chipper, Snob and Neurotic, start imitating his plumage and honk, mockingly. When the tall, thin bird again calls to them, the little birds scoot further down the line and quietly gossip about it.

Undeterred, the bigger bird flies and perches between the flock of smaller birds, but his weight causes the powerline to sag almost to the ground. The smaller birds slide down and are squished together against the big bird's sides. They start chirping indignantly about the cramped space, but the big bird doesn't understand that they are angry and joins in with more squawking.

After a few seconds, Bully angrily pecks the big bird's side, making him stand up in alarm and fall backward, hanging upside down by his feet. Cheered on by the others, Bully and Snob start pecking the big bird's toes, which release one by one from the line, though the big bird doesn't seem to be bothered by this. However, Chipper realizes how close to the ground they are and warns the others, before they finally alert Bully and Snob. They stop too late, and the last toe of the big bird releases, accidentally snapping the line like a slingshot and flinging the little birds out of sight.

The bigger bird lands unharmed on the ground and plays with the floating feathers until one of the smaller birds, now naked, crash lands beside him. He sees the naked little bird and laughs at him, though he kindly offers a leaf for coverage. Seconds later, the 14 other little birds land nearby, also nude. The big bird laughs even harder at the little birds, who quickly hide behind him in defeat.

== Accolades ==
For the Birds won the following awards:

- 2001: 74th Academy Awards—Best Short Animated Film
- 2001: Vancouver Effects and Animation Festival—Animated Computer 3D Short
- 2001: Anima Mundi Animation Festival—Best Film x2
- 2001: Chicago International Children's Film Festival-Short Film or Video—Animation—Second Place
- 2000: Annie Award—Outstanding Achievement in an Animated Short Subject
- 2000: Sitges—Catalan International Film Festival—Best Animated Short Film

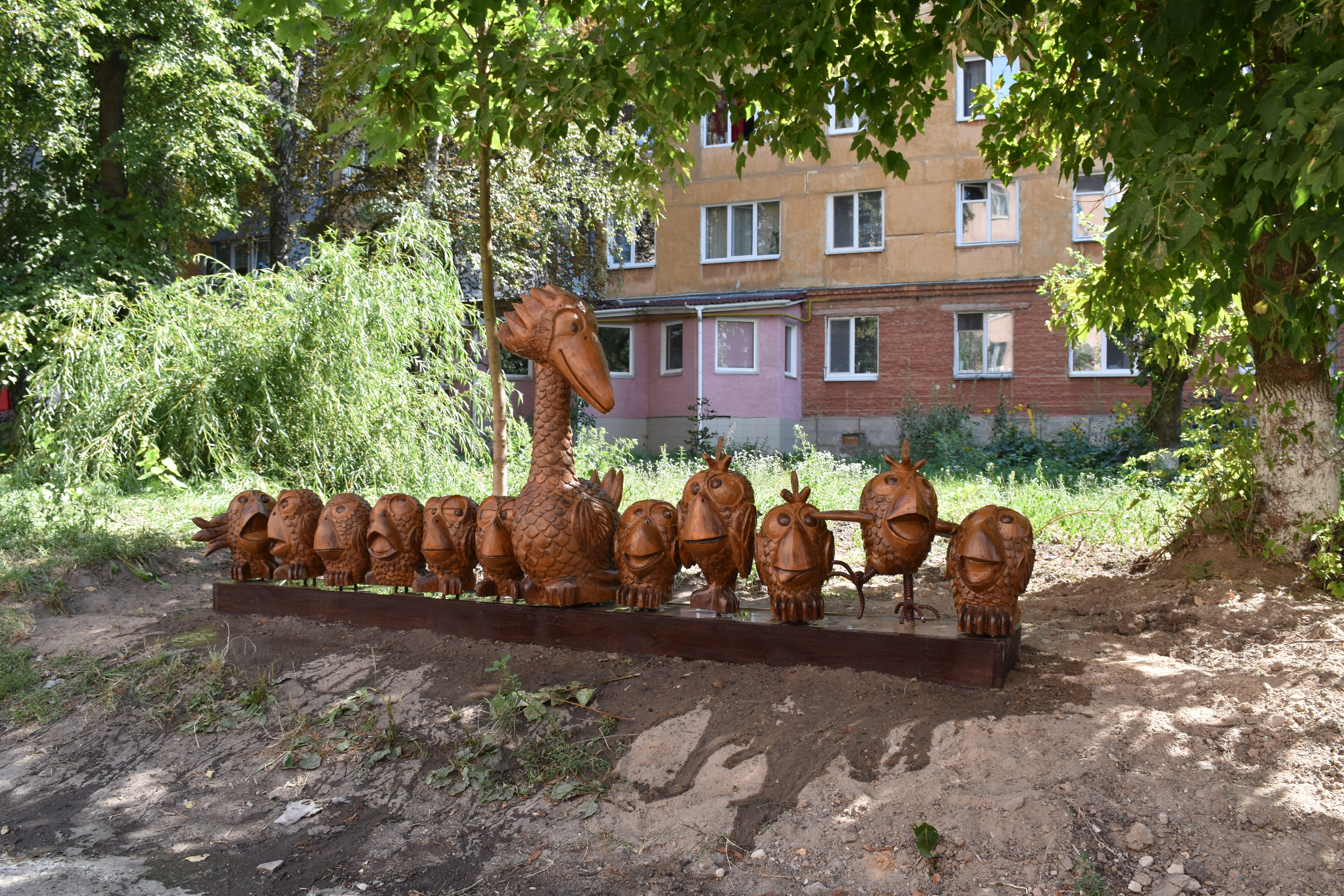
A For the Birds sculpture in Vasylkiv, Ukraine

== Easter eggs ==
A reference to For the Birds was put in the 2006 Pixar film Cars, during the Life Is A Highway segment. When Lightning McQueen is in the back of Mack, they drive down the freeway and pass a section of powerline with the birds resting on top, which is accompanied by the squeaks the birds made to communicate with each other. A similar appearance occurred in Inside Out, while Riley and her family are driving to San Francisco at the beginning of the movie. The small birds also make a cameo appearance in the film Hoppers, which director Daniel Chong confirmed was a deliberate homage.

The birds can be found in the main hub world for the Kinect game Rush: A Disney-Pixar Adventure.

== Releases ==
For the Birds is one of two short films on the DVD and VHS release of Monsters, Inc. The film was also released as part of Pixar Short Films Collection, Volume 1 in 2007. The short was shown alongside the 3D re-release of Monsters Inc. on December 19, 2012. The short was also released in 3D on the 3D Blu-ray of Monsters, Inc., on February 19, 2013. For the Birds was paired in theaters in front of Luca on March 22, 2024.
