= List of Canadian films of 2015 =

This is a list of Canadian films which were released in 2015:

Title	Director	Cast	Genre	Notes	Ref
88	Tim Doiron	Katharine Isabelle, Christopher Lloyd	Thriller	Straight to DVD	
88:88	Isiah Medina		Experimental docudrama		
Across the Line	Director X	Stephan James, Sarah Jeffery, Shamier Anderson	Drama		
Adrien (Le Garagiste)	Renée Beaulieu	Normand D'Amour, Louise Portal	Drama		
After the Last River	Victoria Lean	Theresa Spence	Documentary		
Al Purdy Was Here	Brian D. Johnson	Al Purdy	Documentary		
Always Again (Toujours encore)	Jean-François Boisvenue	Jean-Sébastien Courchesne, Valerie Cadieux	Drama		
The Amina Profile	Sophie Deraspe	Sandra Bagaria	Documentary co-produced with the National Film Board	U.S. title: A Gay Girl in Damascus: The Amina Profile	
Anna	Charles-Olivier Michaud	Anna Mouglalis, Pierre-Yves Cardinal, Pascale Bussières			
Anxietyville	Rob Stefaniuk	Chad Connell, Natalie Lisinska, David Reale	Surreal dark comedy	Released by Vimeo on Demand	
April and the Extraordinary World	Christian Desmares, Franck Ekinci	voices Marion Cotillard, Yolande Moreau. Jean Rochefort	Animated feature	Canada-France-Belgium co-production	
Bacon and God's Wrath	Sol Friedman	Razie Brownstone	Short documentary	Canadian Screen Award winner for Best Short Documentary Film	
The Ballad of Immortal Joe	Hector Herrera	Kenneth Welsh	Animated short	Canadian Screen Award winner for Best Animated Short Film	
Balmoral Hotel	Wayne Wapeemukwa	Angel Gates	Short drama		
Beeba Boys	Deepa Mehta	Randeep Hooda, Ali Momen, Sarah Allen	Crime drama	Canadian Screen Award for Costumes	
Bite	Chad Archibald	Elma Begovic, Annette Wozniak, Denise Yeun, Jordan Grey	Horror		
Blue Thunder (Bleu tonnerre)	Philippe David Gagné, Jean-Marc E. Roy	Dany Placard, Isabelle Blais, Sandrine Bisson, Louis Champagne	Short musical comedy-drama		
Borealis	Sean Garrity	Jonas Chernick, Emily Hampshire	Drama		
Born to Be Blue	Robert Budreau	Ethan Hawke Carmen Ejogo	Biographical drama	About American jazz musician Chet Baker; Canada-U.K. co-production.	
Bring Me the Head of Tim Horton	Guy Maddin, Evan Johnson, Galen Johnson		Short documentary		
Brooklyn	John Crowley	Saoirse Ronan, Emory Cohen, Jim Broadbent	Historical romance based on Colm Tóibín's novel of the same name.	winner of numerous awards; Only the second Canadian film to be nominated for Best Picture at the Oscars; Canada-U.K.-Ireland co-production	
Calamity qui?	Isabelle Prim		Experimental feature	A Canada-France co-production about a woman who claims to be Calamity Jane's daughter.	
Charlotte's Song	Nicholas Humphries	Iwan Rheon, Katelyn Mager	horror-musical-historical-drama	An homage to Hans Christian Andersen's The Little Mermaid.	
Chorus	François Delisle	Sébastien Ricard, Fanny Mallette, Geneviève Bujold, Pierre Curzi	Drama		
A Christmas Horror Story	Grant Harvey, Steven Hoban & Brett Sullivan	George Buza, William Shatner	Anthology film		
Closet Monster	Stephen Dunn	Connor Jessup, Isabella Rossellini, Joanne Kelly, Aaron Abrams	Drama	TIFF - Best Canadian Feature	
Cold Deck	Zack Bernbaum	Stéfano Gallo, Kjartan Hewit, Jessica Sipos, Kate Trotter, Robert Knepper, Paul Sorvino	Thriller		
Corbo	Mathieu Denis	Anthony Therrien, Karelle Tremblay, Antoine L'Écuyer, Tony Nardi	Drama	Canadian Screen Awards nomination for Best Picture	
Darwin	Benjamin Duffield	Nick Krause, Molly Parker	Sci-fi drama		
Death Dive (Le Scaphandrier)	Alain Vézina	Éric Gagné, Édith Côté-Demers, Alexandre Landry, Raymond Bouchard, Béatrice Picard	Horror		
The Demons (Les démons)	Philippe Lesage	Édouard Tremblay-Grenier, Laurent Lucas, Pascale Bussières	Drama	Canadian Screen Awards nomination for Best Picture	
Le Dep	Sonia Boileau	Eve Ringuette, Charles Buckell-Robertson, Yan England	Drama, thriller		
The Devout	Connor Gaston	Charlie Carrick, Ali Liebert, Olivia Martin, Gabrielle Rose, David Nykl, Ryan McDonell	supernatural drama	VIFF - B.C. Emerging Filmmaker award	
Diamond Tongues	Pavan Moondi & Brian Robertson	Leah Fay Goldstein	Comedy, drama	Canadian Screen Awards nomination for Best Actress in a Leading Role	
The Diary of an Old Man (Le Journal d’un vieil homme)	Bernard Émond	Paul Savoie, Marie Ève Pelletier	Drama	Based on Chekhov's short story, "A Boring Story"	
Dead Rising: Watchtower	Zach Lipovsky	Jesse Metcalfe, Dennis Haysbert, Virginia Madsen	Zombie horror	Made with U.S. financing	
Driving with Selvi	Elisa Paloschi		Documentary		
Eadweard	Kyle Rideout	Michael Eklund, Sara Canning, Christopher Heyerdahl, Torrance Coombs, Jodi Balfour	Biopic of pioneering American photographer Eadweard Muybridge		
Ego Trip	Benoît Pelletieri	Patrick Huard, Antoine Bertrand	Comedy		
Endorphine	André Turpin	Sophie Nélisse, Monia Chokri, Anne-Marie Cadieux, Stéphane Crête	Drama		
Every Thing Will Be Fine	Wim Wenders	James Franco, Charlotte Gainsbourg, Marie-Josée Croze, Robert Naylor, Rachel McAdams	Drama	Canada-German-France-Sweden-Norway co-production made with U.S. financing	
Family Demolition (La démolition familiale)	Patrick Damien-Roy		Documentary		
February	Oz Perkins	Kiernan Shipka, Emma Roberts, Lucy Boynton	Horror, thriller	Made with U.S. financing	
Fire Song	Adam Garnet Jones	Jennifer Podemski, Derek Miller	Drama		
Fish Plane, Heart Clock	Avro Leo	Pudlo Pudlat	Documentary		
Footprints (L'Empreinte)	Yvan Dubuc, Carole Poliquin	Roy Dupuis	Documentary		
The Forbidden Room	Guy Maddin, Evan Johnson	Roy Dupuis, Louis Negin, Udo Kier, Gregory Hlady, Mathieu Amalric	Drama	Canadian Screen Awards nomination for Best Picture	
Forsaken	Jon Cassar	Kiefer Sutherland, Donald Sutherland	Western	The first screen pairing of Kiefer and Donald Sutherland; Canada-France co-production	
Fractured Land	Fiona Rayher and Damien Gillis	Caleb Behn	Documentary films		
Full Out	Sean Cisterna		Drama		
The Girl King	Mika Kaurismäki	Malin Buska, Sarah Gadon, Michael Nyqvist	Historical drama	Canada-Finland-Germany-Sweden-France co-production	
Guantanamo's Child	Patrick Reed & Michelle Shephard	Omar Khadr	Documentary	Based on Guantanamo's Child: The Untold Story of Omar Khadr, a Canadian citizen convicted on terrorism charges and subsequently incarcerated at Guantanamo Bay	
Gurov and Anna (Gurov et Anna)	Rafaël Ouellet		Drama		
Hadwin's Judgement	Sasha Snow		Documentary		
Haida Gwaii: On the Edge of the World	Charles Wilkinson	Severn Cullis-Suzuki, Chief Allan Wilson, Guujaaw	Documentary	Winner Best Canadian Documentary Hot Docs, Most Popular Canadian Documentary VIFF	
The Handout (Autrui)	Micheline Lanctôt	Brigitte Pogonat, Robin Aubert	Drama		
He Hated Pigeons	Ingrid Veninger	Pedro Fontaine, Cristobal Tapia Montt	Drama		
The Heart of Madame Sabali (Le cœur de Madame Sabali)	Ryan McKenna	Marie Brassard, Francis La Haye, Hugo Giroux, Amadou & Mariam	comedy-drama	Best Feature Film (Focus Section) at the Festival du Nouveau Cinema	
Hellions	Bruce McDonald	Chloe Rose, Robert Patrick, Rossif Sutherland	Horror		
Hevn (Revenge)	Kjersti Steinsbø	Anders Baasmo Christiansen, Trond Espen Seim, Siren Jørgensen	Drama	Canada-Norway co-production	
Highway of Tears	Matthew Smiley	Nathan Fillion	Documentary	Best Documentary award at the Malibu Film Festival	
How Heavy This Hammer	Kazik Radwanski	Erwin Van Cotthem, Kate Ashley, Seth Kirsh	Drama		
How to Plan an Orgy in a Small Town	Jeremy Lalonde	Lauren Holly, Jewel Staite, Katharine Isabelle	Comedy		
Hurt	Alan Zweig	Steve Fonyo	Documentary		
Hyena Road	Paul Gross	Paul Gross, Rossif Sutherland, Clark Johnson, Allan Hawco, Christine Horne, David Richmond-Peck	Afghan war drama	Canadian Screen Awards for Sound, Sound Editing and Visual Effects	
I Am the Blues	Daniel Cross	Featuring Bobby Rush, Barbara Lynn, Henry Gray and others	Documentary	Canadian Screen Awards for Best Feature-Length Documentary and Best Cinematography in a Feature-Length Documentary	
Inner Jellyfishes (Les Méduses)	Marc-Antoine Lemire	Rudi Duperré, Samuel Brassard, Jade Hassouné	Short drama		
Interview with a Free Man (Entrevue avec un homme libre)	Nicolas Lévesque		Short documentary		
Into the Forest	Patricia Rozema	Elliot Page, Evan Rachel Wood, Max Minghella, Callum Keith Rennie, Michael Eklund, Sandy Sidhu	Drama based on Into the Forest by Jean Hegland	made for DirecTV in U.S., later released theatrically in Canada	
Invention	Mark Lewis		National Film Board documentary	Cinematic tour of Toronto, São Paulo, and Paris’ Musée du Louvre	
Khoya	Sami Khan		Drama		
The Kind Words	Shemi Zarhin	Rotem Zissman-Cohen	Drama	Canada-Israel co-production	
Last of the Elephant Men	Arnaud Bouquet, Daniel Ferguson		Documentary		
Legend of the Lich Lord	Spencer Estabrooks	Mikaela Cochrane, Julie Orton	Faux documentary		
Life	Anton Corbijn	Robert Pattinson, Dane DeHaan, Ben Kingsley, Joel Edgerton	Biopic	About James Dean and photographer Dennis Stock; a Canada-German-Australia-U.K. co-production with U.S. financing.	
The Little Deputy	Trevor Anderson	Trevor Anderson	Short documentary		
Les Loups	Sophie Deraspe	Evelyne Brochu, Louise Portal, Gilbert Sicotte	Drama		
The Man in the Shadows	Joshua Fraiman	Sarah Jurgens, Alison Louder	Drama		
The Man Who Shot Hollywood	Barry Avrich	Jack Pashkovsky	Documentary		
Manor (Manoir)	Martin Fournier, Pier-Luc Latulippe		Documentary		
The Masked Saint	Warren P. Sonoda	Brett Granstaff, Lara Jean Chorostecki, T.J. McGibbon, Diahann Carroll	Drama		
Maurice	François Jaros	Richard Fréchette	Short drama		
The Messenger	Su Rynard		Documentary		
Mina Walking	Yosef Baraki	Farzana Nawabi, Hashmatullah Fanai, Qadir Aryaie	National Film Board drama	Canada-Afghanistan co-production	
The Mirage (Le Mirage)	Ricardo Trogi	Louis Morissette, Julie Perreault	Comedy-drama		
Mobilize	Caroline Monneti		National Film Board documentary	Musical score by Tanya Tagaq	
My Enemies (Mes ennemis)	Stéphane Géhami	Louise Marleau, Frédéric Lemay, Hubert Proulx	Drama		
My Internship in Canada (Guibord s'en va-t-en guerre)	Philippe Falardeau	Patrick Huard, Suzanne Clément, Irdens Exantus	Satire, comedy	Canadian Screen Awards nomination for Best Picture	
Natasha	David Bezmozgis	Alex Ozerov, Sasha K. Gordon, Deanna Dezmari, Genadijs Dolganovs	Drama		
Nina	Halima Elkhatabi	Elizabeth Gagnon-Tremblay	Short drama		
Ninth Floor	Mina Shum		National Film Board documentary		
No Men Beyond This Point	Mark Sawers	Patrick Gilmore, Kristine Cofsky, Rekha Sharma	Comedy		
Noir	Yves-Christian Fournier	Salim Kechiouche, Benz Antoine, Julie Djiezion	Drama		
North Mountain	Bretten Hannam	Justin Rain, Glen Gould	Action/thriller		
Numb	Jason R. Goode	Jamie Bamber, Marie Avgeropoulos, Aleks Paunovic	Drama		
O Negative	Steven McCarthy	Steven McCarthy, Alyx Melone	Horror short		
On My Mother's Side (L'Origine des espèces)	Dominic Goyer	Marc Paquet, Sylvie De Morais-Nogueira, Marc Béland	Drama		
One Night Stand: A Modern Love Story (Ce qu'il ne faut pas dire)	Marquise Lepage	Annick Fontaine, Christian Michaud	Romantic comedy		
L'Or du golfe	Ian Jaquier	Kevin Parent	Documentary		
Our Loved Ones (Les êtres chers)	Anne Émond	Maxim Gaudette, Karelle Tremblay	Drama	Canadian Screen Awards nomination for Best Picture	
Overpass (Viaduc)	Patrice Laliberté		Short drama		
The Passion of Augustine (La Passion d’Augustine)	Léa Pool	Céline Bonnier, Anne-Élisabeth Bossé, Gilbert Sicotte, Marie Tifo, Andrée Lachapelle	Drama		
the pass system	Alex Williams	Tantoo Cardinal	Documentary	Historical investigation into the segregationist system of the same name.	
Paul à Québec	François Bouvier	François Létourneau, Julie Le Breton, Gilbert Sicotte	Drama		
The Pedophile (Le Pédophile)	Ara Ball		Short drama	Kennedy Brodeur, Valérie Fortin, Patrick Renaud, Lesley Marie Reade, Monia Chokri	
People Hold On	Michael Seater	Noah Reid, Chloe Rose, Ashley Leggat, Katie Boland			
A Place Called Shandro	James Motluk		Documentary	Gold Remi WorldFest-Houston International Film Festival	
Portrait of a Serial Monogamist	John Mitchell & Christina Zeidler	Diane Flacks, Carolyn Taylor	Romantic comedy		
Prisoner X	Gaurav Seth	Julian Richings, Michelle Nolden, Damon Runyan	Sci-fi thriller		
The Rainbow Kid	Kire Paputts	Nicholas Campbell, Julian Richings	Drama		
Remember	Atom Egoyan	Christopher Plummer, Dean Norris, Martin Landau, Bruno Ganz, Heinz Lieven, Jürgen Prochnow, Henry Czerny	Drama	Canadian Screen Award for Best Screenplay; Canada-German co-production	
River	Jamie M. Dagg	Rossif Sutherland, Sara Botsford	Thriller	Canada-Laos co-production	
Roboshark	Jeffery Lando	Alexis Peterman Matt Rippy	Satirical sci-fi thriller	Bulgaria-Canada co-production	
A Rock and a Hard Place	Cliff Caines		Documentary		
Room	Lenny Abrahamson	Brie Larson, Jacob Tremblay, Joan Allen, Sean Bridgers, William H. Macy	Drama based on a novel and screenplay by Emma Donoghue	winner of numerous awards; The third Canadian film to receive an Academy Award nomination for Best Picture; Canada-Ireland-UK-USA co-production.	
The Saver	Wiebke von Carolsfeld	Imajyn Cardinal, Pascale Bussières, Brandon Oakes	Drama		
Scratch	Sébastien Godron	Raphaël Joseph Lafond, Fayolle Jean Jr., Schelby Jean-Baptiste	Musical drama		
She Stoops to Conquer	Zack Russell	Kayla Lorette, Julian Richings	Short drama		
Sleeping Giant	Andrew Cividino	Jackson Martin, Nick Serino	Drama	TIFF - Best First Feature; Canadian Screen Award Best Supporting Actor Nick Serino	
The Sleepwalker (Sonámbulo)	Theodore Ushev		Animated short		
Snowtime! (La Guerre des tuques 3D)	Jean-François Pouliot	Angela Galuppo, Mariloup Wolfe, Lucinda Davis, Sophie Cadieux, Gildor Roy	Animated	Remake of 1984 film The Dog Who Stopped the War (La Guerre des tuques)	
Some Kind of Love	Thomas Burstyn	Yolanda Sonnabend, Joseph Sonnabend	Documentary		
The Sound of Trees (Le bruit des arbres)	François Péloquin	Antoine L'Écuyer, Roy Dupuis	Drama		
Star	Émilie Mannering		Short drama		
The Steps	Andrew Currie	James Brolin, Emmanuelle Chriqui, Christine Lahti, Jason Ritter	Comedy, drama		
Sugar Coated	Michèle Hozer		Documentary		
A Summer Love (Un amour d'été)	Jean-François Lesage		Documentary		
Survivors Rowe	Daniel Roher		Documentary		
This Changes Everything	Avi Lewis		Documentary	Made with U.S. financing	
Turbo Kid	François Simard, Anouk Whissell, Yoann-Karl Whissell	Munro Chambers, Laurence Leboeuf, Edwin Wright, Aaron Jeffery, Michael Ironside	Horror, thriller	Canada-New Zealand co-production	
Ville-Marie	Guy Édoin	Monica Bellucci, Aliocha Schneider, Pascale Bussières	Drama		
The Voice (La Voce)	David Uloth	Miro Lacasse, Catherine Ruel, Julie De Lafrenière, Harry Standjofski, Marc Labrèche	Short drama		
The Waiting Room	Igor Drljaca	Jasmin Geljo, Cintija Asperger, Ma-Anne Dionisio	Drama	Canada- Bosnia & Herzegovina-Croatia co-production	
Welcome to F.L.	Geneviève Dulude-De Celles		Documentary		
Where Atilla Passes (Là où Atilla passe…)	Onur Karaman	Émile Schneider, Ambrosio De Luca, Julie Deslauriers, Roy Dupuis	Drama		
The Witch	Robert Eggers	Anya Taylor-Joy, Ralph Ineson, Kate Dickie	Horror	Sundance Film Festival - Best Director; Made with U.S. financing	
World Famous Gopher Hole Museum	Chelsea McMullan, Doug Nayler		Short documentary		
Zombie Massacre 2: Reich of the Dead	Luca Boni & Marco Ristori	Lucy Drive, Ally McClelland, Dan van Husen	Horror	Canada-Italy co-production	
Zoom	Pedro Morelli	Gael García Bernal, Mariana Ximenes, Alison Pill, Don McKellar	Animated, live-action	Canada-Brazil co-production	

== See also ==
- 2015 in Canada
- 2015 in Canadian television
