= Prix Iris for Most Successful Film Outside Quebec =

Annual Canadian film award

The Prix Iris for Most Successful Film Outside Quebec (French: Prix Iris du film s'étant le plus illustré à l'extérieur du Québec) is an annual film award presented by Québec Cinéma as part of the Prix Iris awards program, to honour films made within the Cinema of Quebec which have had significant success beyond the province, both in English Canada and internationally.

For the purposes of the award, "success" is calculated as a weighted formula incorporating a variety of factors, including box office tallies, film festival bookings, awards and sales to international distributors. The award takes into account success attained within the eligibility period regardless of when the film was originally released; on two occasions to date, the same film has won the award two years in a row, and on two occasions films have had moderate success in their original year of release, making the shortlist but not being named as the winner, and then went on to win the award the following year.

Until 2016, it was known as the Jutra Award for Most Successful Film Outside Quebec in memory of influential Quebec film director Claude Jutra. Following the withdrawal of Jutra's name from the award, the 2016 award was presented under the name Québec Cinéma. The Prix Iris name was announced in October 2016.

The award was first presented at the 2nd Jutra Awards in 2000. For the first nine years of its existence, only the winner was named each year; beginning with the 11th Jutra Awards in 2009, an advance shortlist of films eligible for the award was announced. Initially, only the directors would receive the awards. Starting at the 16th Jutra Awards, producers were added to award, while screenwriters would be included starting at the 23rd Quebec Cinema Awards.

Producer Nancy Grant received the most nominations, eleven, while she and Xavier Dolan received the most awards, with five each, including three shared wins for Mommy, It's Only the End of the World (Juste la fin du monde) and Matthias & Maxime. With her win for The Nature of Love (Simple comme Sylvain), she became the third person to receive ten awards, tying Bernard Gariépy-Strobl and only trailing behind Xavier Dolan with fifteen wins.

== 2000s ==
Year	Film	Filmmakers
2000; 2nd Jutra Awards
2000; 2nd Jutra Awards	Set Me Free (Emporte-moi)	Léa Pool
2001; 3rd Jutra Awards
2001; 3rd Jutra Awards	Possible Worlds	Robert Lepage
2002; 4th Jutra Awards
2002; 4th Jutra Awards	Maelström	Denis Villeneuve
2002; 4th Jutra Awards	Lost and Delirious	Léa Pool
2003; 5th Jutra Awards
2003; 5th Jutra Awards	Chaos and Desire (La Turbulence des fluides)	Manon Briand
2004; 6th Jutra Awards
2004; 6th Jutra Awards	The Barbarian Invasions (Les Invasions barbares)	Denys Arcand
2005; 7th Jutra Awards
2005; 7th Jutra Awards	The Barbarian Invasions (Les Invasions barbares)	Denys Arcand
2006; 8th Jutra Awards
2006; 8th Jutra Awards	C.R.A.Z.Y.	Jean-Marc Vallée
2007; 9th Jutra Awards
2007; 9th Jutra Awards	C.R.A.Z.Y.	Jean-Marc Vallée
2008; 10th Jutra Awards
2008; 10th Jutra Awards	Bon Cop, Bad Cop	Kevin Tierney
2009; 11th Jutra Awards
2009; 11th Jutra Awards	Mommy Is at the Hairdresser's (Maman est chez le coiffeur)	Léa Pool
2009; 11th Jutra Awards	Continental, a Film Without Guns (Continental, un film sans fusil)	Stéphane Lafleur
2009; 11th Jutra Awards	Everything Is Fine (Tout est parfait)	Yves-Christian Fournier
2009; 11th Jutra Awards	The Necessities of Life (Ce qu'il faut pour vivre)	Benoît Pilon
2009; 11th Jutra Awards	The 3 L'il Pigs (Les 3 p'tits cochons)	Patrick Huard

== 2010s ==
Year	Film	Filmmakers
2010; 12th Jutra Awards
2010; 12th Jutra Awards	I Killed My Mother (J'ai tué ma mère)	Xavier Dolan
2010; 12th Jutra Awards	It's Not Me, I Swear! (C'est pas moi, je le jure!)	Philippe Falardeau
2010; 12th Jutra Awards	Mommy Is at the Hairdresser's (Maman est chez le coiffeur)	Léa Pool
2010; 12th Jutra Awards	The Necessities of Life (Ce qu'il faut pour vivre)	Benoît Pilon
2010; 12th Jutra Awards	A No-Hit No-Run Summer (Un été sans point ni coup sûr)	Francis Leclerc
2011; 13th Jutra Awards
2011; 13th Jutra Awards	Heartbeats (Les Amours imaginaires)	Xavier Dolan
2011; 13th Jutra Awards	Curling	Denis Côté
2011; 13th Jutra Awards	Incendies	Denis Villeneuve
2011; 13th Jutra Awards	7 Days (Les 7 jours du talion)	Daniel Grou
2011; 13th Jutra Awards	The Trotsky	Jacob Tierney
2012; 14th Jutra Awards
2012; 14th Jutra Awards	Incendies	Denis Villeneuve
2012; 14th Jutra Awards	Café de Flore	Jean-Marc Vallée
2012; 14th Jutra Awards	Curling	Denis Côté
2012; 14th Jutra Awards	Monsieur Lazhar	Philippe Falardeau
2012; 14th Jutra Awards	The Salesman (Le vendeur)	Sébastien Pilote
2013; 15th Jutra Awards
2013; 15th Jutra Awards	Monsieur Lazhar	Philippe Falardeau
2013; 15th Jutra Awards	Bestiaire	Denis Côté
2013; 15th Jutra Awards	Camion	Rafaël Ouellet
2013; 15th Jutra Awards	Laurence Anyways	Xavier Dolan
2013; 15th Jutra Awards	Starbuck	Ken Scott
2013; 15th Jutra Awards	War Witch (Rebelle)	Kim Nguyen
2014; 16th Jutra Awards
2014; 16th Jutra Awards	Gabrielle	Louise Archambault, Luc Déry, Kim McCraw
2014; 16th Jutra Awards	The Dismantling (Le Démantèlement)	Sébastien Pilote, Bernadette Payeur, Marc Daigle
2014; 16th Jutra Awards	Inch'Allah	Anaïs Barbeau-Lavalette, Luc Déry, Kim McCraw, Stephen Traynor
2014; 16th Jutra Awards	Tom at the Farm (Tom à la ferme)	Xavier Dolan, Nancy Grant, Lyse Lafontaine, Charles Gillibert, Nathanaël Karmitz
2014; 16th Jutra Awards	Vic and Flo Saw a Bear (Vic+Flo ont vu un ours)	Denis Côté, Stéphanie Morissette, Sylvain Corbeil
2015; 17th Jutra Awards
2015; 17th Jutra Awards	Mommy	Xavier Dolan, Nancy Grant
2015; 17th Jutra Awards	Gerontophilia	Bruce LaBruce, Nicolas Cormeau Leonard Farlinger, Jennifer Jonas
2015; 17th Jutra Awards	The Grand Seduction	Don McKellar, Roger Frappier, Barbara Doran
2015; 17th Jutra Awards	Tom at the Farm (Tom à la ferme)	Xavier Dolan, Nancy Grant, Lyse Lafontaine, Charles Gillibert, Nathanaël Karmitz
2015; 17th Jutra Awards	You're Sleeping Nicole (Tu dors Nicole)	Stéphane Lafleur, Luc Déry, Kim McCraw
2016; 18th Quebec Cinema Awards
2016; 18th Quebec Cinema Awards	Felix and Meira (Félix et Meira)	Maxime Giroux, Sylvain Corbeil, Nancy Grant
2016; 18th Quebec Cinema Awards	Chorus	François Delisle, Maxime Bernard
2016; 18th Quebec Cinema Awards	Elephant Song	Charles Binamé, Richard Goudreau, Lenny Jo Goudreau
2016; 18th Quebec Cinema Awards	The Passion of Augustine (La passion d'Augustine)	Léa Pool, Lyse Lafontaine, François Tremblay
2016; 18th Quebec Cinema Awards	Turbo Kid	François Simard, Anouk Whissell, Yoann-Karl Whissell, Anne-Marie Gélinas, Benoît Beaulieu, Tim Riley, Ant Timpson
2017; 19th Quebec Cinema Awards
2017; 19th Quebec Cinema Awards	It's Only the End of the World (Juste la fin du monde)	Xavier Dolan, Sylvain Corbeil, Nancy Grant, Elisha Karmitz, Nathanaël Karmitz, Michel Merkt
2017; 19th Quebec Cinema Awards	Boris Without Béatrice (Boris sans Béatrice)	Denis Côté, Sylvain Corbeil, Nancy Grant
2017; 19th Quebec Cinema Awards	Nelly	Anne Émond, Nicole Robert
2017; 19th Quebec Cinema Awards	Shambles (Maudite poutine)	Karl Lemieux, Sylvain Corbeil, Nancy Grant
2017; 19th Quebec Cinema Awards	Two Lovers and a Bear	Kim Nguyen, Roger Frappier, Jonathan Bronfman, Ellen Hamilton
2018; 20th Quebec Cinema Awards
2018; 20th Quebec Cinema Awards	Ravenous (Les Affamés)	Robin Aubert, Stéphanie Morissette
2018; 20th Quebec Cinema Awards	All You Can Eat Buddha	Ian Lagarde, Ménaïc Raoul, Gabrielle Tougas-Fréchette
2018; 20th Quebec Cinema Awards	Ballerina	Éric Summer, Éric Warin, Valérie D’Auteuil, André Rouleau, Nicolas Duval-Adassovsky, Laurent Zeitoun, Yann Zenou
2018; 20th Quebec Cinema Awards	Hochelaga, Land of Souls (Hochelaga, terre des âmes)	François Girard, Roger Frappier
2018; 20th Quebec Cinema Awards	X Quinientos	Juan Andrés Arango, Yanick Létourneau, Jorge Andrés Botero, Edher Campos, Luis Salinas
2019; 21st Quebec Cinema Awards
2019; 21st Quebec Cinema Awards	The Fall of the American Empire (La Chute de l'empire américain)	Denys Arcand, Denise Robert
2019; 21st Quebec Cinema Awards	Cielo	Alison McAlpine, Paola Castillo
2019; 21st Quebec Cinema Awards	Eye on Juliet	Kim Nguyen, Pierre Even
2019; 21st Quebec Cinema Awards	The Fireflies Are Gone (La disparition des lucioles)	Sébastien Pilote, Marc Daigle, Bernadette Payeur
2019; 21st Quebec Cinema Awards	Racetime (La Course des tuques)	Benoît Godbout, François Brisson, Marie-Claude Beauchamp

== 2020s ==
Year	Film	Filmmakers	Ref
2020; 22nd Quebec Cinema Awards
2020; 22nd Quebec Cinema Awards	Matthias & Maxime	Xavier Dolan, Nancy Grant	
2020; 22nd Quebec Cinema Awards	Antigone	Sophie Deraspe, Marc Daigle	
2020; 22nd Quebec Cinema Awards	A Brother's Love (La femme de mon frère)	Monia Chokri, Sylvain Corbeil, Nancy Grant	
2020; 22nd Quebec Cinema Awards	Genesis (Genèse)	Philippe Lesage, Galilé Marion-Gauvin	
2020; 22nd Quebec Cinema Awards	Ghost Town Anthology (Répertoire des villes disparues)	Denis Côté, Ziad Touma	
2020; 22nd Quebec Cinema Awards	Kuessipan	Myriam Verreault, Félize Frappier	
2021; 23rd Quebec Cinema Awards
2021; 23rd Quebec Cinema Awards	The Song of Names	François Girard, Lyse Lafontaine, Robert Lantos, Viktória Petrányi, Nick Hirschkorn, Jeffrey Caine	
2021; 23rd Quebec Cinema Awards	Goddess of the Fireflies (La déesse des mouches à feu)	Anaïs Barbeau-Lavalette, Luc Vandal, Catherine Léger	
2021; 23rd Quebec Cinema Awards	My Salinger Year (Mon année à New York)	Philippe Falardeau, Luc Déry, Kim McCraw, Ruth Coady, Susan Mullen	
2021; 23rd Quebec Cinema Awards	Nadia, Butterfly	Pascal Plante, Dominique Dussault	
2021; 23rd Quebec Cinema Awards	Target Number One	Daniel Roby, Valérie d’Auteuil, André Rouleau	
2022; 24th Quebec Cinema Awards
2022; 24th Quebec Cinema Awards	Bootlegger	Caroline Monnet, Catherine Chagnon, Daniel Watchorn	
2022; 24th Quebec Cinema Awards	Beans	Tracey Deer, Anne-Marie Gélinas, Meredith Vuchnich	
2022; 24th Quebec Cinema Awards	Drunken Birds (Les oiseaux ivres)	Ivan Grbovic, Luc Déry, Kim McCraw, Sara Mishara	
2022; 24th Quebec Cinema Awards	Felix and the Treasure of Morgäa (Félix et le trésor de Morgäa)	Nicola Lemay, Nancy Florence Savard, Marc Robitaille	
2022; 24th Quebec Cinema Awards	Saint-Narcisse	Bruce LaBruce, Nicolas Comeau, Paul Scherzer, Martin Girard	
2023; 25th Quebec Cinema Awards
2023; 25th Quebec Cinema Awards	Falcon Lake	Nancy Grant, Sylvain Corbeil, Dany Boon, Jalil Lespert, Julien Deris, David Gauquié, Jean-Luc Ormières, Charlotte Le Bon, Ariane Giroux-Dallaire	
2023; 25th Quebec Cinema Awards	Dounia and the Princess of Aleppo (Dounia et la princesse d’Alep)	Judith Beauregard, Marya Zarif, André Kadi, Chantale Pagé	
2023; 25th Quebec Cinema Awards	Katak: The Brave Beluga (Katak, le brave béluga)	Nancy Florence Savard, Christine Dallaire-Dupont, Nicola Lemay, Andrée Lambert, Xiaojuan Zhou, Chantale Pagé	
2023; 25th Quebec Cinema Awards	This House (Cette maison)	Félix Dufour-Laperrière, Myriam Charles, Serge Abiaad	
2023; 25th Quebec Cinema Awards	Viking	Luc Déry, Kim McCraw, Stéphane Lafleur, Eric K. Boulianne, Christian Larouche, Sébastien Létourneau	
2024; 26th Quebec Cinema Awards
2024; 26th Quebec Cinema Awards	The Nature of Love (Simple comme Sylvain)	Monia Chokri, Sylvain Corbeil, Nancy Grant, Elisha Karmitz, Nathanaël Karmitz	
2024; 26th Quebec Cinema Awards	Humanist Vampire Seeking Consenting Suicidal Person (Vampire humaniste cherche suicidaire consentant)	Jeanne-Marie Poulain, Line Sander Egede, Ariane Louis-Seize, Christine Doyon, Stéphanie Demers, Jean-Christophe J. Lamontagne	
2024; 26th Quebec Cinema Awards	Manufacturing the Threat (Produire le menace)	Amy Miller	
2024; 26th Quebec Cinema Awards	Red Rooms (Les Chambres rouges)	Dominique Dussault, Pascal Plante, Stéphanie Demers, Jean-Christophe J. Lamontagne	
2024; 26th Quebec Cinema Awards	Richelieu	Pier-Philippe Chevigny, Geneviève Gosselin-G.	
2025; 27th Quebec Cinema Awards
2025; 27th Quebec Cinema Awards	Universal Language (Une langue universelle)	Sylvain Corbeil, Matthew Rankin, Ila Firouzabadi, Pirouz Nemati	
2025; 27th Quebec Cinema Awards	Hola Frida!	Florence Roche, André Kadi, Laurence Petit, Carole Scotta, Eliott Khayat, Karine Vézina	
2025; 27th Quebec Cinema Awards	Intercepted	Oksana Karpovych, Rocío Barba Fuentes, Giacomo Nudi, Pauline Tran Van Lieu, Lucie Rego, Darya Bassel, Olha Beskhmelnytsina	
2025; 27th Quebec Cinema Awards	Shepherds (Bergers)	Luc Déry, Kim McCraw, Élaine Hébert, Caroline Bonmarchand, Xenia Sulyma, Sophie Deraspe, Mathyas Lefebure	
2025; 27th Quebec Cinema Awards	Who by Fire (Comme le feu)	Galilé Marion-Gauvin, Philippe Lesage	

== Multiple wins and nominations ==
=== Multiple wins ===
Wins	Filmmakers
6	Nancy Grant
5	Sylvain Corbeil
5	Xavier Dolan
3	Denys Arcand
3	Léa Pool
2	Elisha Karmitz
2	Nathanaël Karmitz
2	Jean-Marc Vallée
2	Denis Villeneuve

=== Three or more nominations ===
Not including the awards prior to the 11th Jutra Awards:

Nominations	Filmmakers
11	Nancy Grant
9	Sylvain Corbeil
8	Xavier Dolan
7	Luc Déry
7	Kim McCraw
6	Denis Côté
4	Philippe Falardeau
4	Nathanaël Karmitz
4	Lyse Lafontaine
3	Marc Daigle
3	Roger Frappier
3	Stéphane Lafleur
3	Kim Nguyen
3	Sébastien Pilote
3	Léa Pool
