= 18th Quebec Cinema Awards =

2016 Canadian film awards ceremony

The 18th Quebec Cinema Awards ceremony (French: Gala du cinéma québécois 2016) were held on March 20, 2016 to honour films made with the participation of the Quebec film industry in 2015.

The ceremony was the first to be held since Québec Cinéma dropped the "Jutra Awards" name from its awards program, following the publication in February 2016 of allegations that namesake director Claude Jutra had been a pedophile. The organization established a committee to determine a new permanent name for the awards, which announced the new Prix Iris name in October 2016.

Winners at the 2016 ceremony received a new wooden statue, replacing the previous trophy created by Charles Daudelin. The new trophy was created by Montreal's Nouveau Studio; it is made of solid maple, painted white, with gold and acrylic leaves. With only three weeks to design and produce the new statue following the renaming of the award, it would not have been possible to cast the trophies out of bronze.

The Passion of Augustine (La passion d'Augustine) won six awards from eleven nominations, including Best Film, the first film directed by a woman to win the award, Best Director and Best Supporting Actress for Diane Lavallée. Céline Bonnier received her tenth acting nomination and won her second Best Actress award, having previously won for Deliver Me (Délivrez-moi).

Corbo, Elephant Song and Our Loved Ones (Les êtres chers) were nominated for ten, nine and seven awards respectively, but lost all of their nominations. Additionally, Elephant Song tied the record for the film with the most nominations without being nominated for Best Film, joining Babine and The Master Key (Grande Ourse: la clé des possibles).

With only two nominations, Philippe Lesage's The Demons (Les démons) became the Best Film nominee with the least nominations. For his rôle in Paul à Québec, Gilbert Sicotte won his second Best Actor award.

My Internship in Canada (Guibord s'en va-t-en guerre) won three awards from four nominations, including Best Supporting Actor for Irdens Exantus. Felix and Meira (Félix et Meira) won two awards from six nominations, including Best Screenplay, while Brooklyn won the two awards it was nominated for. Snowtime! (La guerre des tuques 3D) won one competitive award and the Billet d'or, becoming the first animated feature film to win an award.

== Winners and nominees ==
Best Film	Best Director
The Passion of Augustine (La passion d'Augustine) — Lyse Lafontaine, François Tremblay; Corbo — Félize Frappier; The Demons (Les démons) — Galilé Marion-Gauvin, Philippe Lesage; Felix and Meira (Félix et Meira) — Sylvain Corbeil, Nancy Grant, Maxime Giroux; Our Loved Ones (Les êtres chers) — Sylvain Corbeil, Nancy Grant	Léa Pool, The Passion of Augustine (La passion d'Augustine); Mathieu Denis, Corbo; Anne Émond, Our Loved Ones (Les êtres chers); Maxime Giroux, Felix and Meira (Félix et Meira); Philippe Lesage, The Demons (Les démons)
Best Actor	Best Actress
Gilbert Sicotte, Paul à Québec; Xavier Dolan, Elephant Song; Maxim Gaudette, Our Loved Ones (Les êtres chers); Alexandre Landry, Love in the Time of Civil War (L'amour au temps de la guerre civile); Paul Savoie, The Diary of an Old Man (Le journal d'un vieil homme)	Céline Bonnier, The Passion of Augustine (La passion d'Augustine); Laurence Leboeuf, Turbo Kid; Fanny Mallette, Chorus; Anna Mouglalis, Anna; Hadas Yaron, Felix and Meira (Félix et Meira)
Best Supporting Actor	Best Supporting Actress
Irdens Exantus, My Internship in Canada (Guibord s'en va-t-en guerre); Salim Kechiouche, Noir; Jean-Simon Leduc, Love in the Time of Civil War (L'amour au temps de la guerre civile); Tony Nardi, Corbo; Luzer Twersky, Felix and Meira (Félix et Meira)	Diane Lavallée, The Passion of Augustine (La passion d'Augustine); Christine Beaulieu, The Mirage (Le mirage); Schelby Jean-Baptiste, Scratch; Catherine-Audrey Lachapelle, Love in the Time of Civil War (L'amour au temps de la guerre civile); Lysandre Ménard, The Passion of Augustine (La passion d'Augustine)
Best Screenplay	Best Cinematography
Alexandre Laferrière and Maxime Giroux, Felix and Meira (Félix et Meira); Mathieu Denis, Corbo; Anne Émond, Our Loved Ones (Les êtres chers); Céleste Parr, Gurov and Anna; Marie Vien and Léa Pool, The Passion of Augustine (La passion d'Augustine)	Yves Bélanger, Brooklyn; Steve Asselin, Corbo; Serge Desrosiers, Ville-Marie; Pierre Gill, Elephant Song; Daniel Jobin, The Passion of Augustine (La passion d'Augustine)
Best Art Direction	Best Sound
François Séguin, Brooklyn; Philippe Arseneau Bussières, Snowtime! (La guerre des tuques 3D); Éric Barbeau, Corbo; Éric Barbeau, Our Loved Ones (Les êtres chers); Patrice Bengle, The Passion of Augustine (La passion d'Augustine)	Raymond Vermette, Christian Rivest, Stéphane Bergeron, Julie Dufour and Guy Pelletier, Snowtime! (La guerre des tuques 3D); Claude La Haye, Patrice Leblanc and Bernard Gariépy Strobl, Corbo; François Grenon, Sylvain Bellemare and Luc Boudrias, The Sound of Trees (Le bruit des arbres); Claude La Haye, Claude Beaugrand, Luc Boudrias and Patrick Lalonde, Elephant Song; Claude La Haye, Sylvain Bellemare and Bernard Gariépy Strobl, My Internship in Canada (Guibord s'en va-t-en guerre)
Best Editing	Best Original Music
Richard Comeau, My Internship in Canada (Guibord s'en va-t-en guerre); Mathieu Bouchard-Malo, Our Loved Ones (Les êtres chers); François Delisle, Chorus; Dominique Fortin, Elephant Song; Hubert Hayaud, Scratch	Martin Léon, My Internship in Canada (Guibord s'en va-t-en guerre); Jean-Philippe Bernier and Jean-Nicolas Leupi, Turbo Kid; Michel Corriveau, Anna; Gaëtan Gravel and Patrice Dubuc, Elephant Song; Jenny Salgado, André Courcy and Luc St-Pierre, Scratch
Best Costume Design	Best Makeup
Michèle Hamel, The Passion of Augustine (La passion d'Augustine); Judy Jonker, Corbo; Mario Davignon, After the Ball; Ginette Magny, Elephant Song; Éric Poirier, Turbo Kid	Olivier Xavier, Turbo Kid; Lizane Lasalle, Corbo; Catherine Beaudoin, Anna; Nicole Lapierre, Elephant Song; Joan-Patricia Parris and Mario Soucy, Death Dive (Le scaphandrier)
Best Hairstyling	Best Documentary
Martin Lapointe, The Passion of Augustine (La passion d'Augustine); Réjean Goderre, Elephant Song; Martin Lapointe, Corbo; Martin Lapointe, Our Loved Ones (Les êtres chers); Martin Lapointe, Ville-Marie	Uyghurs: Prisoners of the Absurd (Ouïghours, prisonniers de l'absurde) — Patricio Henríquez; The Amina Profile (Le profil Amina) — Sophie Deraspe; Footprints (L'Empreinte) — Yvan Dubuc, Carole Poliquin; L'Or du golfe — Ian Jaquier; The Price We Pay (Le prix à payer) — Harold Crooks
Best Live Short	Best Animated Short
Maurice — François Jaros; Blue Thunder (Bleu tonnerre) — Jean-Marc E. Roy, Philippe David Gagné; Le cycle des moteurs — Patrice Laliberté; The Pedophile (Le pédophile) — Ara Ball; Star — Émilie Mannering	Carface (Autos portraits) — Claude Cloutier; All the Rage — Alexandra Lemay; My Heart Attack — Sheldon Cohen; The Sleepwalker (Sonámbulo) — Theodore Ushev; Squame — Nicolas Brault
Most Successful Film Outside Quebec	Billet d'or
Felix and Meira (Félix et Meira) — Maxime Giroux; Chorus — François Delisle; Elephant Song — Charles Binamé; The Passion of Augustine (La passion d'Augustine) — Léa Pool; Turbo Kid — François Simard, Anouk Whissell, Yoann-Karl Whissell	Snowtime! (La guerre des tuques 3D)

== Multiple wins and nominations ==
=== Films with multiple nominations ===
Nominations	Film
11	The Passion of Augustine (La passion d'Augustine)
10	Corbo
9	Elephant Song
7	Our Loved Ones (Les êtres chers)
6	Felix and Meira (Félix et Meira)
5	Turbo Kid
4	My Internship in Canada (Guibord s'en va-t-en guerre)
3	Anna
3	Chorus
3	Love in the Time of Civil War (L'amour au temps de la guerre civile)
3	Scratch
2	Brooklyn
2	The Demons (Les démons)
2	Snowtime! (La guerre des tuques 3D)
2	Ville-Marie

=== Films with multiple wins ===
Wins	Film
6	The Passion of Augustine (La passion d'Augustine)
3	My Internship in Canada (Guibord s'en va-t-en guerre)
2	Brooklyn
2	Felix and Meira (Félix et Meira)
2	Snowtime! (La guerre des tuques 3D)
