= Alexandre Laferrière =

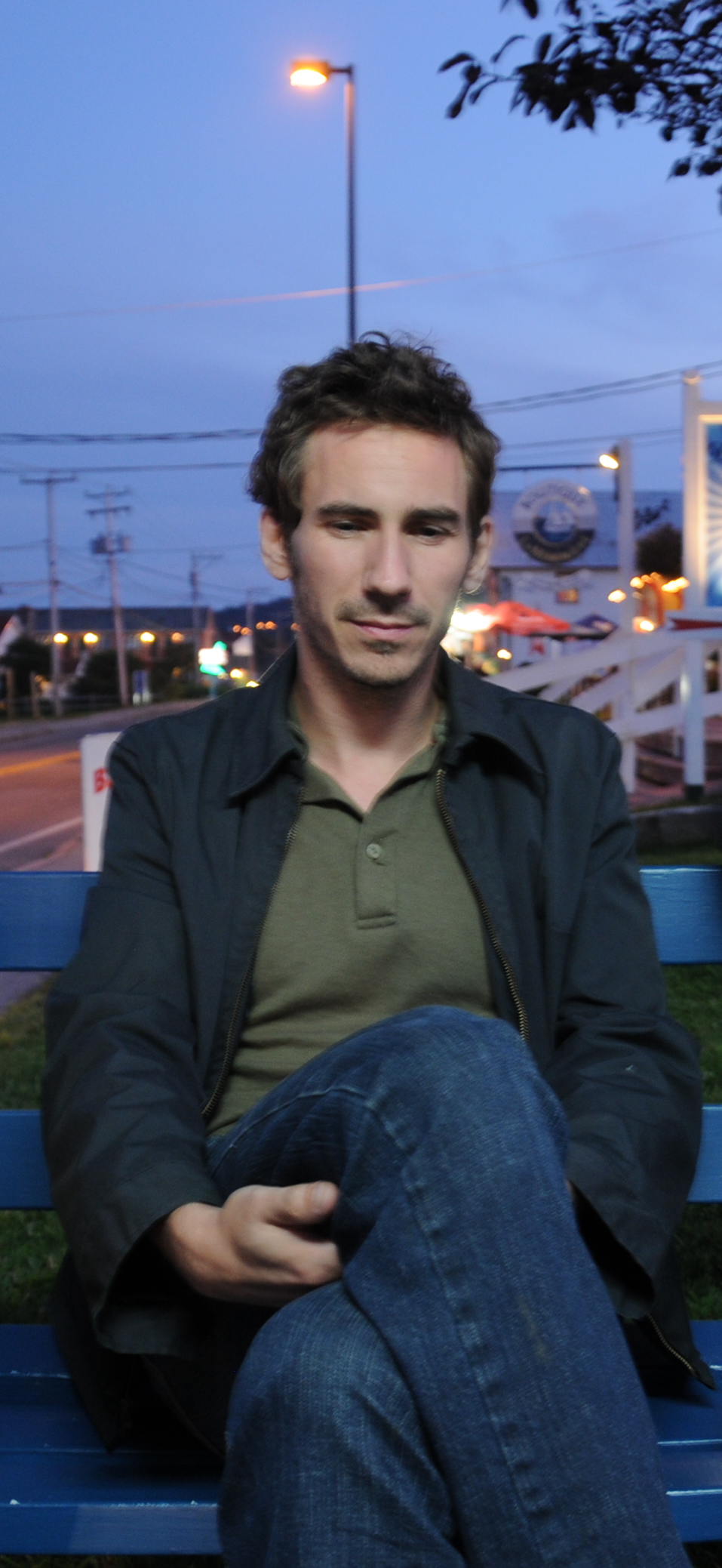
Alexandre Laferrière at the International de Cinéma et d'Art.

Alexandre Laferrière (born 1973) is a Canadian screenwriter known for working with the director Maxime Giroux.

Among his screenplays are Demain (2009) and Jo for Jonathan (Jo pour Jonathan) (2010), directed by Giroux. In meeting with Giroux at cafes to discuss their next project, Giroux said, "We'd see these women and men walking by and we just didn't know anything about them." This provided inspiration for their script Felix and Meira. Laferrière did much of the research. For the 2014 film, Laferrière won Best Screenplay at the Whistler Film Festival, and the Jutra Award for Best Screenplay.
