= Norbourg (film) =

2022 Canadian film

- Directed by: Maxime Giroux
- Written by: Simon Lavoie
- Produced by: Réal Chabot
- Starring: François Arnaud; Vincent-Guillaume Otis
- Cinematography: Sara Mishara
- Edited by: Mathieu Bouchard-Malo
- Music by: Philippe Brault
- Production company: Films du Boulevard
- Distributed by: Maison 4:3; Entract Films
- Release date: April 22, 2022
- Country: Canada
- Language: French

Norbourg is a Canadian drama film, directed by Maxime Giroux and released in 2022. A dramatization of the real-life Norbourg scandal of 2005, the film stars François Arnaud as company president Vincent Lacroix, and Vincent-Guillaume Otis as vice-president Éric Asselin.

The cast also includes Christine Beaulieu, Alexandre Goyette and Guy Thauvette.

The film was slated to premiere on February 5, 2022, at the Festival Vues dans la tête de... film festival in Rivière-du-Loup, Quebec; however, due to the organizers' decision in January to cancel the planned in-person screenings and shift to an online model in light of the continued COVID-19 pandemic in Quebec, it did not premiere at that time. The film had its commercial premiere on April 22.
