= King Dave =

- Film poster
- Directed by: Daniel Grou
- Written by: Alexandre Goyette
- Produced by: Nicole Robert; Jaime Tobon
- Starring: Alexandre Goyette; Karelle Tremblay
- Cinematography: Jérôme Sabourin
- Music by: Milk & Bone
- Production company: Go Films
- Distributed by: Les Films Séville
- Release date: 14 July 2016 (Fantasia International Film Festival)
- Running time: 98 minutes
- Country: Canada
- Language: French
- Budget: $4.7 million

King Dave is a 2016 Canadian drama film directed by "Podz" (Daniel Grou) and starring screenwriter Alexandre Goyette and Karelle Tremblay. Directed as a single shot, it is based on Goyette's stage play of the same name.

The film premiered at the Fantasia International Film Festival. It was nominated for three Canadian Screen Awards.

== Plot ==
Dave is a young man who considers himself to be a king as well as a strong man. When he sees another man dancing with his girlfriend, he sets out for revenge, walking and riding on a car and bus over nine kilometres on his way.

== Cast ==
- Alexandre Goyette as Dave
- Karelle Tremblay as Nathalie
- Mylène St-Sauveur as Isabelle
- Moe Jeudy-Lamour as Ali
- Lise Roy as Vieille écolo
- Micheline Bernard as Dave's mother

== Production ==
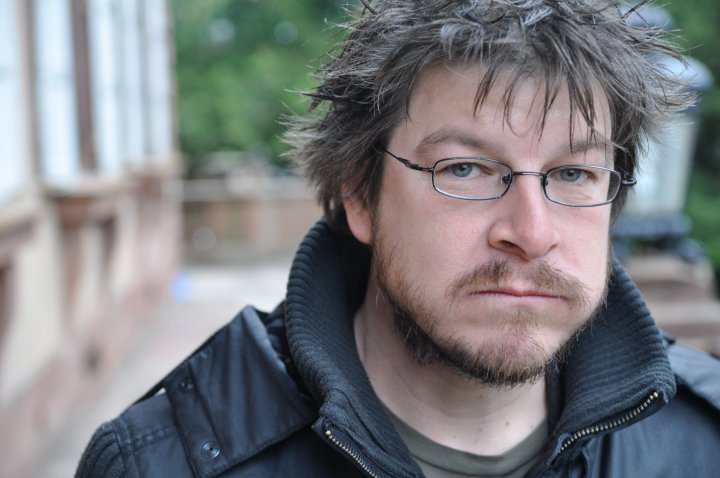
Daniel Grou shot the film in continuous shots.

Alexandre Goyette wrote the film, based on his play. Director Daniel Grou, under his professional pseudonym "Podz", filmed King Dave in five unbroken shots, in five nights. However, all of the footage seen in the released film was taken in the fifth night of shots. Podz said that unlike other "one-shot films" such as Alfred Hitchcock's Rope, this method was not to portray action in real time, but to portray the character narrating in real time. Despite the challenges in the proposed project, producer Nicole Robert was eager to make it and raised a budget of $4.7 million. Art director André Guimond then went location scouting, choosing an area of Montreal for shooting.

Rehearsals took place for weeks before filming commenced. Difficulties on the fourth day caused all of the footage to be unused. Twenty locations were used.

== Reception ==
The film debuted at the Fantasia International Film Festival on 14 July 2016 before a theatrical Quebec release on 15 July. Critical reception was generally positive. The Georgia Straight's Ken Eisner, reviewing the film in the Vancouver International Film Festival in October 2016, called it "highly kinetic" and fun. Marc Cassivi gave it three and a half stars in La Presse.

=== Accolades ===
Award	Date of ceremony	Category	Recipient(s)	Result	Ref(s)
Canadian Screen Awards	12 March 2017	Best Overall Sound	Sylvain Brassard, Michel Lecoufle, Stephen De Oliveira and Nicholas Gagnon	Nominated	
Canadian Screen Awards	12 March 2017	Best Sound Editing	Sylvain Brassard, Guy Pelletier and Christian Rivest	Nominated	
Canadian Screen Awards	12 March 2017	Best Original Song	Camille Poliquin and Laurence Lafond-Beaulne, "Natalie"	Nominated	
Prix Iris	4 June 2017	Best Visual Effects	Jean-Pierre Boies, Mathieu Jolicoeur, Jean-François Talbot	Won	
