= Jo for Jonathan =

2010 Canadian drama film

- French: Jo pour Jonathan
- Directed by: Maxime Giroux
- Written by: Maxime Giroux; Alexandre Laferrière
- Produced by: Paul Barbeau
- Starring: Raphaël Lacaille; Jean-Sébastien Courchesne
- Cinematography: Sara Mishara
- Edited by: Mathieu Bouchard-Malo
- Music by: Olivier Alary
- Production companies: Nouveau Film; Reprise Films
- Distributed by: Métropole Films
- Release date: August 5, 2010 (Locarno)
- Running time: 84 minutes
- Country: Canada
- Language: French

Jo for Jonathan (French: Jo pour Jonathan) is a Canadian drama film, directed by Maxime Giroux and released in 2010. The film stars Raphaël Lacaille as Jonathan, a teenager who wants to emulate his older brother Thomas (Jean-Sébastien Courchesne) and become a player in the world of illegal car racing. Despite not yet having a driver's license, he enters a race and loses, getting into trouble as he does not have money to pay; Thomas must bail him out by racing himself, but is gravely injured in an accident.

The film premiered at the Locarno Film Festival in August 2010, and had its Canadian premiere at the Festival international du cinéma francophone en Acadie in September. It went into commercial release in March 2011.

Lacaille won the Borsos Competition award for best actor in a Canadian film at the 2010 Whistler Film Festival.
