= Nancy Grant =

Canadian film producer

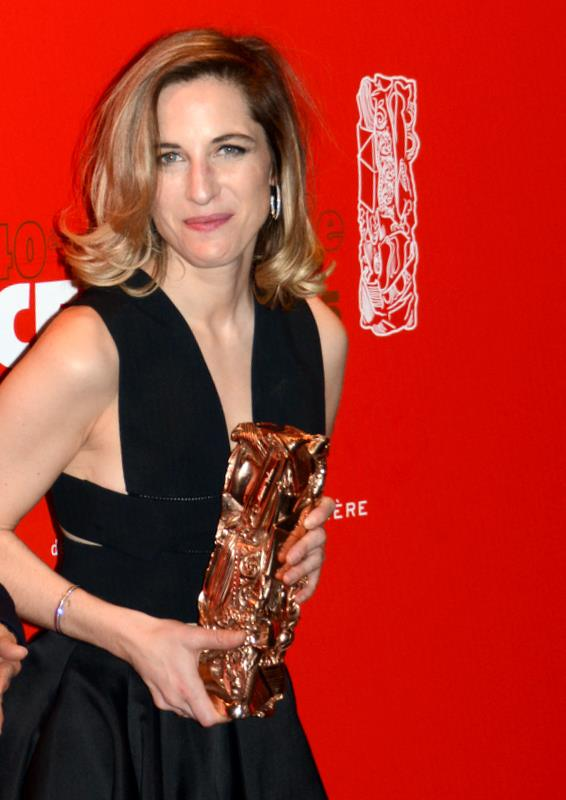
Grant at the 2015 César Awards

Nancy Grant is a French-Québécois Canadian film producer. She was born in the small village of Petit-Matane, on the Gaspé Peninsula in the north of Quebec, Canada. She is best known for producing multiple projects with several Quebec filmmakers including Maxime Giroux, Xavier Dolan, Denis Côté, and Anne Émond. Her recent productions include Tom at the Farm (2013), Mommy (2014), and Félix et Meira (2014), which have received numerous awards at institutions including the Toronto International Film Festival, Alfred Bauer Berlin International Film Festival, Academy Awards, and Cannes Film Festival.

In 2014, she was awarded Best Motion Picture for Mommy at the Canadian Screen Awards.

== Career ==
Grant studied psychology and international development at McGill University in Montreal, Canada and graduated in 2005. She founded Metafilms in Montreal in 2003 with Sylvain Corbeil and frequently collaborates with Xavier Dolan and Maxime Giroux.

Grant co-owns the production company Sons of Manual with director Xavier Dolan.

=== Tom à la ferme ===
Grant took the main stage when she collaborated with Xavier Dolan in 2012. They have created 3 films together since then. Their first project was Tom at the Farm (Tom à la ferme) in 2013, a film based on the play by Michel Marc Bouchard. It was a part of the main screen competition at the 70th Venice International Film Festival, in the special presentation at the 2013 Toronto International Film Festival, and was a nominee for the 2014 Canadian Screen Awards. The psychological thriller follows Tom (played by Dolan himself), a man who has suddenly lost his lover Guillaume, to a remote country home for the funeral where Guillaume's family expects a woman in his place. He decides to keep his relations with Guillaume a secret, but finds himself in an unexpected game with Guillaume's aggressive and curious brother. The film was generally well received as a Hitchcockian Montreal psychological drama thriller, especially in its use of suspense and secrets with country landscapes. Some criticized the film for what they saw as Dolan's self-obsession, as he held the roles of screenwriter, director, co-producer, editor and actor. The film was nominated for 8 awards at the Canadian Screen Awards, and for two at the Venice Film Festival where it won the FIPRESCI Award.

=== Mommy ===
Dolan and Grant continued to collaborate. Shortly after their first project, they produced College Boy, a music video for the French rock band Indochine. Afterwards, in 2014, they began production on Mommy. It is a story of a recently widowed mother and her sometimes violent son with ADHD as they try to cope with their new life. A new neighbour offers her help as the family searches for hope and balance. 90% of both critics and audiences raved about the film and Dolan's authentic style; "Dolan loves close-ups and he gives his actors every chance to demonstrate their talent for ringing the emotional changes in a single take". The film was shot in a square 1:1 ratio. Dolan said of the choice, "I just wanted to shoot portrait aspect ratio that would allow me to be very close to characters, avoid distractions to the left and right of the frame and have the audience look the characters right in the eye". The film has received over 29 awards internationally.

Grant and Dolan followed up in 2018 with Dolan's first English-language film, The Death and Life of John F. Donovan, a "showbiz satire with a big-name cast: Jessica Chastain, Kit Harington, Susan Sarandon, and Kathy Bates".

=== Félix et Meira ===
While Grant was producing Mommy, she was also producing Felix and Meira, directed by Maxime Giroux. Inspired by a neighbourhood Giroux used to live in with a large Hasidic Jewish population, it is an unconventional romance between a young man mourning his dying father and a young Hasidic wife a few blocks away. It was selected to represent Canada as a nomination for Best Foreign Language Film at the 88th Academy Awards. Most critics and audiences praised the film for its sensitive depiction of the Hasidic community. It was an authentic depiction of Giroux's former community, with English, French and Yiddish spoken onscreen. The actors were former Hasidic Jews that have left the community, a choice often viewed as courageous. "I learned a lot about my city, the community I live in and [myself] also. And I think that's why I go to the cinema and I think that's why I live — to learn more about other people." The film was produced in indie fashion; it did not have secure funding while filming but the crew still chose to work. "We were shooting it with $500,000, that's it, and we shot in Venice, Italy, and in Brooklyn", explains Grant about producing Félix et Meira at the same time as Mommy. The film had its world premiere at Toronto International Film Festival, where it won the prestigious Best Canadian Film award, beating Mommy among other films.

== Filmography ==
Year	Film	Director	Credit
2006	One Last Dance	Richard Lehun	Production Manager
2006	Passage (short)	Karl Lemieux	Production Manager
2007	All That She Wants (Elle veut le chaos)	Denis Côté	Production Coordinator/Second Assistant Director
2007	L'appel du vide (short)	Albéric Aurtenèche	Production Coordinator
2007	Code 13 (short)	Mathieu Denis	Production Coordinator
2008	Les affluents volume III: la battue (short)	Guy Édoin	Line Producder
2008	Reviens-tu ce soir? (short)	Geneviève Albert	Producer
2010	Cinéma des aveugles (short)	Daniel Canty	Producer
2010	Félix et Malou (short)	Sophie Dupuis	Producer
2010	Opening Up (M'ouvrir) (short)	Albéric Aurtenèche	Producer
2010	Silence Lies (Tromper le silence)	Julie Hivon	Producer, Production Manager
2010	Curling	Denis Côté	Production Manager
2011	Nuit #1	Anne Émond	Producer
2011	Laurentia (Laurentie)	Mathieu Denis & Simon Lavoie	Producer
2011	Plus rien ne vouloir (short)	Anne Émond	Producer
2012	Faillir (short)	Sophie Dupuis	Producer
2012	The Torrent (Le Torrent)	Simon Lavoie	Associate Producer and Production Manager
2013	La tête en bas (short)	Maxime Giroux	Producer
2013	Tom at the Farm (Tom à la ferme)	Xavier Dolan	Executive Producer
2013	An Extraordinary Person (Quelqu'un d'extraordinaire) (short)	Monia Chokri	Producer
2013	Acrobat (short)	Eduardo Menz	Producer
2013	"College Boy" (Indochine) short	Xavier Dolan	Executive Producer
2013	Vic and Flo Saw a Bear (Vic + flo ont vu un ours)	Denis Côté	Associate Producer
2013	Diego Star	Frédérick Pelletier	Producer
2014	Felix and Meira (Félix et Meira)	Maxime Giroux	Producer
2014	Mommy	Xavier Dolan	Producer
2014	Joy of Man's Desiring (Que ta joie demeure) (documentary)	Denis Côté	Producer
2015	Our Loved Ones (Les êtres chers)	Anne Émond	Producer (with Sylvain Corbeil)
2016	Shambles (Maudite poutine)	Karl Lemieux	Producer
2016	It's Only the End of the World (Juste la fin du monde)	Xavier Dolan	Producer
2017	The Death and Life of John F. Donovan	Xavier Dolan	Producer
2022	Falcon Lake	Charlotte Le Bon	Producer
2022	The Night Logan Woke Up (La nuit où Laurier Gaudreault s'est réveillé)	Xavier Dolan	Producer
2021	Charlotte	Éric Warin and Tahir Rana	Executive producer
2023	The Nature of Love (Simple comme Sylvain)	Monia Chokri	Producer
2023	The Beast	Bertrand Bonello	Co-producer

== Awards and nominations ==
Grant won the Best Film award at the 17th Jutra Awards for her production of Mommy. The film was included in Canada's Top Ten feature films of 2014 selected by filmmakers and industry professionals at TIFF. She was also awarded the 2014 CMPA Feature Film Producer's Award.
