= Hola Frida! =

2024 film by André Kadi and Karine Vézina

- Directed by: André Kadi; Karine Vézina
- Screenplay by: Anne Bryan; Sophie Faucher; André Kadi
- Based on: Frida, c’est moi by Sophie Faucher and Cara Carmina
- Produced by: André Kadi; Florence Roche
- Starring: Emma Rodriguez; Olivia Ruiz; Manuel Tadros
- Music by: Laetitia Pansanel-Garric
- Production companies: Haut et Court; Du Coup Animation
- Release dates: June 15, 2024 (Annecy); October 25, 2024 (Morelia); February 12, 2025 (France)
- Running time: 82 minutes
- Countries: Canada; France
- Language: Spanish

Hola Frida! is a Canadian-French animated film, directed by André Kadi and Karine Vézina and released in 2024. Based in part on Sophie Faucher's illustrated children's book Frida c'est moi, the film recounts the childhood of influential Mexican artist Frida Kahlo.

The film's voice cast includes Emma Rodriguez as Kahlo in childhood and Olivia Ruiz as Kahlo in adulthood, as well as Sophie Faucher, Rebeca Gonzales, Léo Côté, Manuel Tadros, Annie Girard and Joey Bélanger in supporting roles.

The film received a preview screening at the 2024 Annecy International Animation Film Festival, and had its official premiere at the Morelia International Film Festival.

== Awards ==
Award	Date of ceremony	Category	Recipient(s)	Result	Ref(s)
Quebec Cinema Awards	2025	Most Successful Film Outside Quebec	Florence Roche, André Kadi, Laurence Petit, Carole Scotta, Eliott Khayat, Karine Vézina	Nominated	
