= Platanero =

2025 Canadian short film directed by Juan Frank Hernandez

- Directed by: Juan Frank Hernandez
- Written by: Juan Frank Hernandez; Vincent Labelle
- Produced by: Laurence Ly; Beatrice Moukhaiber
- Starring: Irdens Exantus; Stanley Exantus
- Cinematography: Benoit Jones-Vallée
- Edited by: Marianne Langston
- Music by: Maxime Fortin
- Production companies: Films Camera Oscura; Mentes Fritas
- Distributed by: Les Films du 3 mars
- Release date: January 26, 2025 (Sundance)
- Running time: 25 minutes
- Countries: Canada; Dominican Republic
- Languages: Haitian Creole; Spanish

Platanero is a 2025 horror short film directed by Juan Frank Hernandez. A co-production of companies from Canada and the Dominican Republic, the film stars Irdens Exantus and Stanley Exantus as Gran-Fré and Ti-Fré, two brothers from Haiti living in a shantytown refugee camp in the Dominican. Gran-Fré supports them by working on a banana plantation, but a mysterious beast stalks the banana trees when the brothers try to go steal food in the darkness of night.

The cast also includes Jean-Mathieu Bérubé, José María Cabral, Ramón Emilio Candelario, Carlo Harrietha and Jonathan St-Armand in supporting roles.

The film premiered at the 2025 Sundance Film Festival.

The film received a Quebec Cinema Award nomination for Best Live Action Short Film at the 27th Quebec Cinema Awards, and was shortlisted for the Prix collégial du cinéma québécois in the Best Short Film category in 2026.
