= Sylvain Corbeil =

Canadian film producer

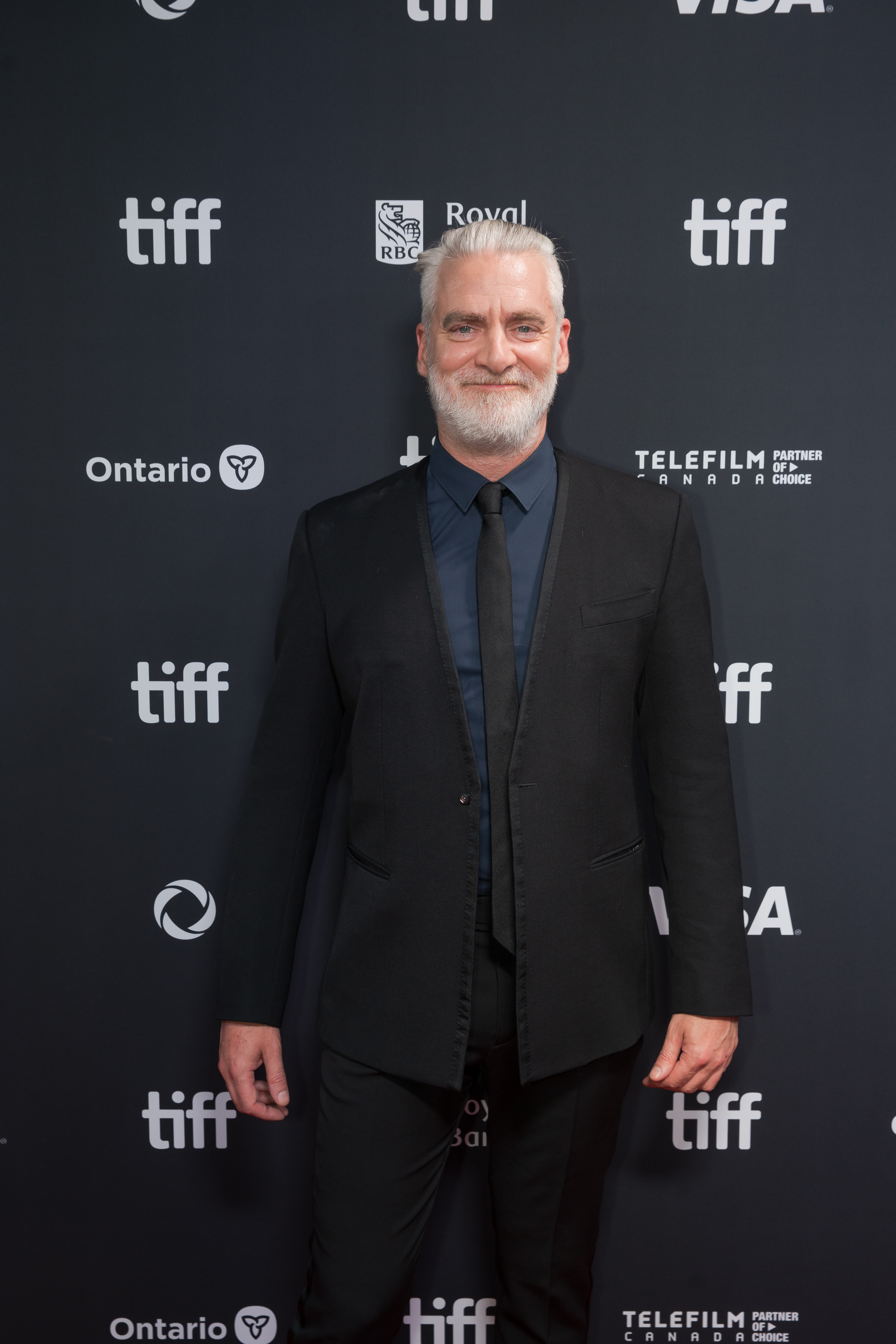
- Occupation: Film producer
- Organization: Metafilm
- Awards: Canadian Screen Award for Best Motion Picture

Sylvain Corbeil is a Canadian film producer. He is known for working with producer Nancy Grant and directors Xavier Dolan, Anne Émond, Maxime Giroux and Denis Côté.

Corbeil and Grant lead the Montreal-based company Metafilm. The Huffington Post credited Corbeil with expertise in Quebec's cinema business, and seeing potential in giving Quebec films international exposure. To that end, he took Mathieu Denis and Simon Lavoie's film Laurentie to the Berlin Film Festival. He has been nominated for the Canadian Screen Award for Best Motion Picture for Giroux's Felix and Meira (2014), Émond's Our Loved Ones (2015), and Dolan's It's Only the End of the World (2016). It's Only the End of the World won Best Motion Picture, and Corbeil accepted awards and read statements by Dolan, who was unable to attend while working on The Death and Life of John F. Donovan in Paris.
