= Alexandre Goyette =

Canadian actor and writer

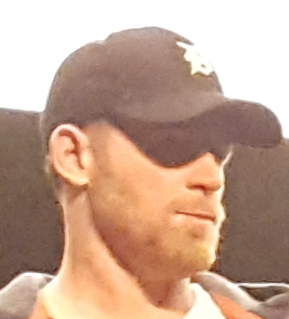
- Born: April 11, 1979 (age 47); Montreal, Quebec
- Years active: 2000s–present
- Spouse: Geneviève Côté

Alexandre Goyette (born April 11, 1979) is a Canadian actor and writer from Quebec, most noted as the writer of the stage play King Dave and the screenwriter and star of its 2016 film adaptation.

== Background ==
He grew up in Montréal-Nord and Rivière-des-Prairies, Quebec, and was educated at Collège André-Grasset and the Cégep de Saint-Hyacinthe.

== Career ==
King Dave was first staged in 2005 as a solo one-man show in which Goyette played all of the characters himself. The film adaptation featured several actors.

In 2020, Goyette collaborated with actor Anglesh Major to update the story with Black Lives Matter themes so that Major could star in a revival for the Théàtre Jean-Duceppe; in 2023, Patrick Emmanuel Abellard also starred in an English-language translation of the Black-themed version for Centaur Theatre.

In addition to King Dave, he has had other supporting roles in film and television, and has had stage roles including Victor in Down Dangerous Passes Road (Le chemin des Passes-Dangereuses), Marco in The Decline of the American Empire (Le Déclin de l'empire américain), and Caius Marcius in Coriolanus.

In 2014, he had his first credit as a director, staging his own French translation of Mike Bartlett's play Cock for Espace 4001.

== Personal life ==
He has been in a longterm relationship with Geneviève Côté, a former actress who now has a psychotherapy practice.

== Filmography ==
=== Film ===
Year	Title	Role	Notes
2007	Nitro	Colosse	
2008	The Deserter (Le Déserteur)	Roger Lizotte	
2009	La Nuit finira	Stéphane	
2010	7 Days (Les 7 jours du Talion)		
2010	The Last Escape (La Dernière fugue)	The father, 1968	
2010	Twice a Woman (Deux fois une femme)	French professor	
2011	Fear of Water (La peur de l'eau)	McCann	
2011	A Sense of Humour (Le sens de l'humour)	Carl	
2011	De l'autre côté	Corentin Michelet	
2012	Kvistur	Jòn Fridbjörnsson	
2012	Laurence Anyways	Marco de Bellefeuille	
2014	Antoine and Marie (Antoine et Marie)	Éric Gauthier	
2014	Mommy	Patrick	
2014	What Are We Doing Here? (Qu’est-ce qu’on fait ici ?)	Sgt. Cadorette	
2015	Rabid Dogs (Enragés)	Police officer at accident scene	
2016	King Dave	Dave	Also screenwriter
2016	Nitro Rush	Colosse	
2017	My Intelligent Comedy (Les Scènes fortuites)	Réal	
2018	March Fool (Poisson de mars)		
2021	The Guide to the Perfect Family (La Guide de la famille parfaite)	Stéphane Dubois	
2022	The Cheaters (Les Tricheurs)	Michel	
2022	Norbourg	Julien Giguère	
2023	Tell Me Why These Things Are So Beautiful (Dis-moi pourquoi ces choses sont si belles)	Marie-Victorin Kirouac	

=== Television ===
Year	Title	Role	Notes
2004	Grande Ourse	Police officer	One episode
2005	Providence	Laurent Lavoie	Six episodes
2005	Miss Météo	Deliveryman	
2005-2009	La Promesse	Alain Marion	
2006-2008	C.A.	Martin Poirier	45 episodes
2010	Musée Eden	Mont-Rouge	Two episodes
2011-2015	19-2	Inspecteur Dandenneau, SQ	14 episodes
2012	En thérapie	Éric	
2012	Toute la vérité	Henri Levasseur	10 episodes
2014	Trauma	Georges McDuff	One episode
2014-2015	La Théorie du K.O.	Christian Boisvert	24 episodes
2015	Med		One episode
2016	Feux	Marc Lemaire	Nine episodes
2016	Mirador		One episode
2016-2017	District 31	Kevin Nadeau	25 episodes
2017	Le Siège	Alexis Godin	Six episodes
2018	L'Échappée	Bruno	
2018	Faits divers	Jimmy O'Connor	One episode
2018	Mensonges	Chuck Marcoux	Five episodes
2020-	Happily Married (C'est comme ça que je t'aime)	Jimmy, the biker with a missing finger	Four episodes
2021	Après		Six episodes
2021-2022	Six Degrés	Francis Fournier	26 episodes
2022	Ma mère	Nick	Six episodes
2022	Le Pacte	Jason	
2022-2023	La Confrérie	Daniel	10 episodes
