= Miryam Charles =

Haitian-Canadian filmmaker

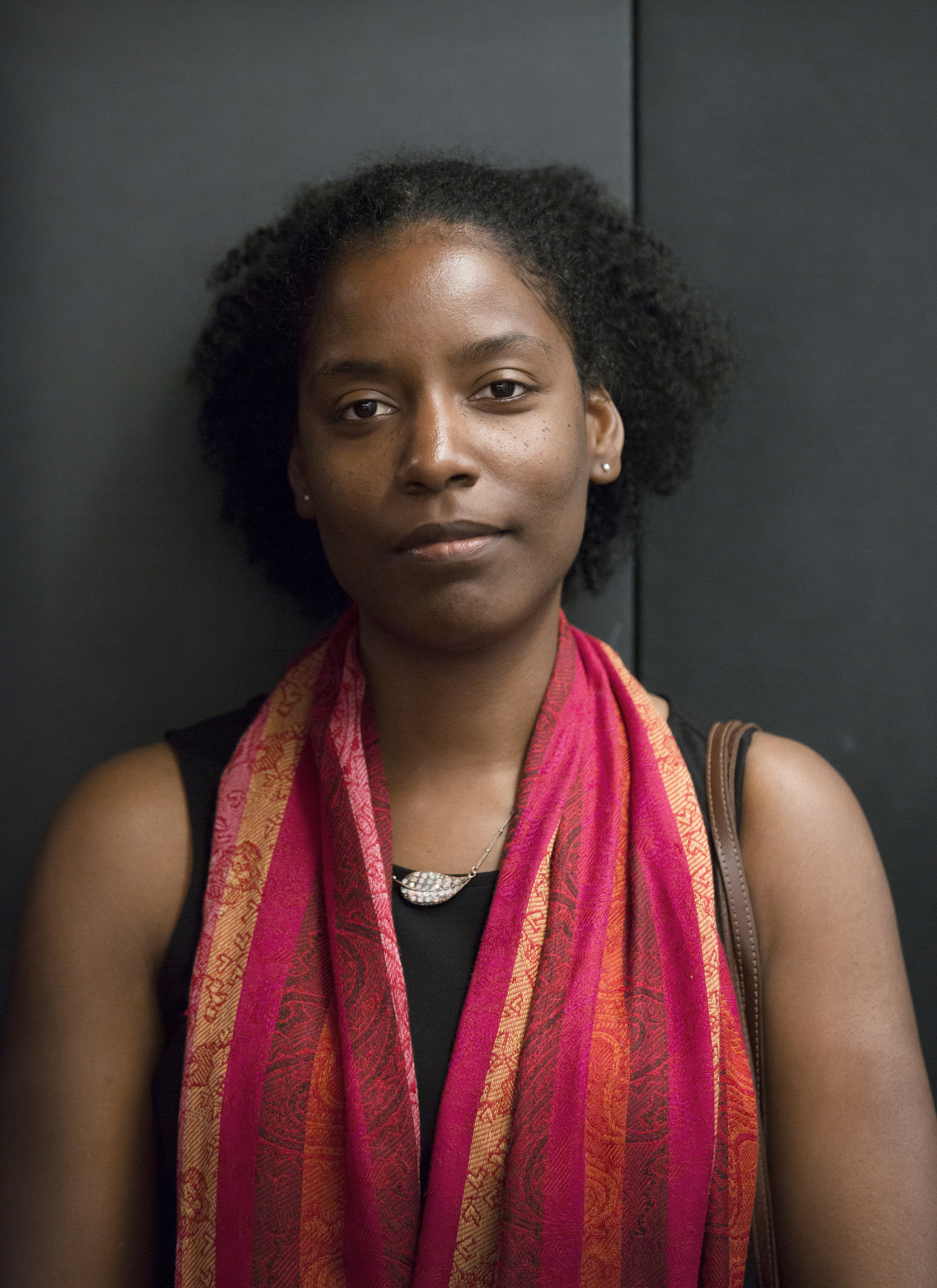
- Education: Collège Ahuntsic, Concordia University
- Occupations: film director, film producer, cinematographer

Miryam Charles is a Haitian-Canadian filmmaker from Montreal, Quebec, whose debut feature film This House (Cette maison) was released in 2022.

The film was longlisted for the Directors Guild of Canada's 2022 Jean-Marc Vallée DGC Discovery Award, and was named to the Toronto International Film Festival's annual year-end Canada's Top Ten list for 2022.

An alumna of the Mel Hoppenheim School of Cinema at Concordia University, Charles previously directed a number of short films, and has been a producer and cinematographer on several films by Olivier Godin.

== Career ==
Her films have been exhibited in film festivals and museum institutions throughout the Americas and Europe. This House has its world premiere at the 2022 Berlinale Forum at Berlin International Film Festival, the AFI Film Festival, and the TIFF Top 10 of the year. Her short film At Dusk, was first released at the Locarno Film Festival, in Italy.

Charles received awards at IndieLisboa and the Trinidad and Tobago Film Festival. The artist has had museum presentations at Block Museum of Art, Northwestern University, and University of Iowa. Her film Song for the New World is in the permanent collection of the Pérez Art Museum Miami, Florida, and Drei Atlas is in the collection of Musée d’art contemporain de Montréal, Canada.

Her short film All the Days of May (Tous les jours de mai) screened in the Short Cuts program at the 2023 Toronto International Film Festival.

In 2025, she was named the inaugural recipient of the Charles Officer Award at the opening of the Canada's Top Ten screening series.

== Filmography ==
- Fly, Fly Sadness (Vole, vole tristesse) - 2015
- Toward the Colonies - 2016
- Mosaic - 2017
- A Fortress - 2018
- Drei Atlas - 2018
- Second Generation - 2019
- Song for the New World (Chanson pour le Nouveau Monde) - 2021
- This House (Cette maison) - 2022
- At Dusk (Au crépuscule) - 2022
- All the Days of May (Tous les jours de mai) - 2023
- Treasure Island (L’île aux trésors ) - 2026
