= Nuit 1 =

Nuit #1
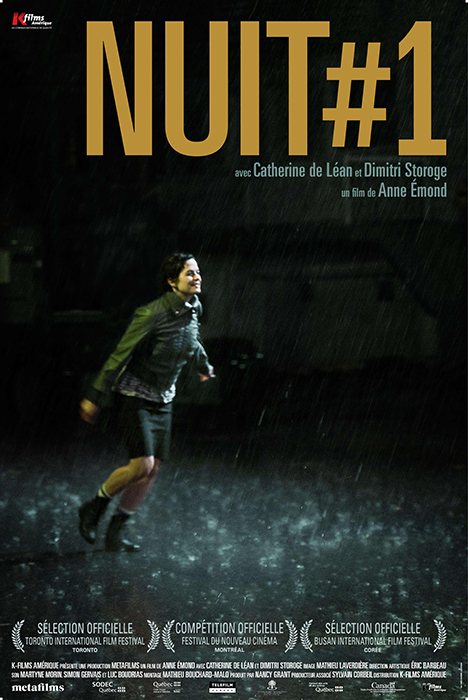
- Directed by: Anne Émond
- Written by: Anne Émond
- Produced by: Nancy Grant
- Starring: Catherine De Léan; Dimitri Storoge
- Cinematography: Mathieu Laverdière
- Edited by: Mathieu Bouchard-Malo
- Music by: Martin M. Tétreault
- Production company: Metafilms
- Distributed by: K-Films Amérique
- Release dates: September 13, 2011 (TIFF); December 16, 2011 (Quebec)
- Running time: 91 minutes
- Country: Canada
- Language: French

Nuit #1 (English: Night #1) is a 2011 Canadian drama film written and directed by Anne Émond in her feature-length fiction debut. Starring Catherine De Léan and Dimitri Storoge, the film centres on a one-night encounter between two strangers. It premiered at the 2011 Toronto International Film Festival and won awards at the Vancouver International Film Festival and the Claude Jutra Award.

== Synopsis ==
The film follows Clara and Nikolaï, who meet at a rave and spend the night together at his apartment. When Nikolaï wakes as Clara is leaving, he calls for her to come back inside, and the night turns into a long conversation in which both reveal painful aspects of their lives.

== Cast ==
The cast includes:

- Catherine De Léan as Clara
- Dimitri Storoge as Nikolaï

== Production ==
Anne Émond wrote and directed the film, her first feature-length fiction film. Principal photography took place in Montreal and the surrounding area from October 17 to November 13, 2010. The film was produced by Nancy Grant for Metafilms.

== Release ==
The film premiered at the 2011 Toronto International Film Festival on September 13, 2011, and was released theatrically in Quebec on December 16, 2011 by K-Films Amérique. It also screened at several international film festivals, including the Vancouver International Film Festival, the Festival du nouveau cinéma, and the Tübingen International French Language Film Festival.

== Reception ==
=== Critical response ===
The Hollywood Reporter described the film as a "bold and intimate study of a one-night stand" and "quietly raw", praising its lead performances and Émond’s screenplay.

Betsy Sharkey of the Los Angeles Times called the film "provocative and erotic", while noting that it "often plays like a play rather than a movie". She praised Émond’s "smart contemplation of youth and the difficulties of making meaningful emotional connections" as well as the performances of Catherine De Léan and Dimitri Storoge.

Writing for Film Comment, Jonathan Robbins called the film an "insightful meditation on the politics of mood, sexuality, and Quebecois national identity". He praised Émond’s "excruciating care and technical prowess", the performances, and Mathieu Laverdière’s cinematography.

=== Awards and nominations ===
- 2011 Vancouver International Film Festival, Shaw Media Award for Best Canadian Feature Film – Won
- 2012 Genie Award for Best Performance by an Actress in a Leading Role – Nominee, Catherine De Léan
- 2012 Genie Award for Best Original Screenplay – Nominee, Anne Émond
- 2012 Claude Jutra Award for Best Debut Director – Won, Anne Émond
- 2012 Prix collégial du cinéma québécois – Nominee
