= The Sleepwalker (2015 film) =

2015 Canadian animated short film

- Directed by: Theodore Ushev
- Produced by: Galilé Marion-Gauvin; Theodore Ushev; Dominique Noujeim
- Edited by: Theodore Ushev
- Music by: Kottarashky
- Production company: Les Productions Unité centrale
- Release date: March 2015 (Holland Animated Film Festival)
- Running time: 5 minutes
- Country: Canada

The Sleepwalker (Spanish: Sonámbulo) is a Canadian animated short film, directed by Theodore Ushev and released in 2015. Inspired by Federico García Lorca's poem "Romance Sonámbulo", the film depicts the dreams of a woman through the interplay of abstract shapes and patterns.

The film received a Canadian Screen Award nomination for Best Animated Short Film at the 4th Canadian Screen Awards, and a Quebec Cinema Award nomination for Best Animated Short Film at the 18th Quebec Cinema Awards.
