= Corbo =

- Film poster
- Directed by: Mathieu Denis
- Written by: Mathieu Denis
- Produced by: Félize Frappier
- Starring: Anthony Therrien; Antoine L'Écuyer; Karelle Tremblay; Tony Nardi; Marie Brassard
- Cinematography: Steve Asselin
- Edited by: Nicolas Roy
- Music by: Olivier Alary
- Production company: Max Films Média
- Distributed by: Les Films Christal / Les Films Séville
- Release date: 17 April 2015 (Canada)
- Running time: 119 minutes
- Country: Canada
- Language: French
- Budget: C$4.1 million

Corbo is a 2014 Canadian drama film written and directed by Mathieu Denis. Based on the life of Jean Corbo, the film follows his involvement with the Front de libération du Québec. It premiered at the 2014 Toronto International Film Festival and was included in Canada’s Top Ten in 2014. The film received several nominations at the Canadian Screen Awards and the Jutra Awards.

== Synopsis ==
Based on a true story, the film follows Giovanni (Jean) Corbo, the teenage son of Italian immigrant Nicola Corbo and his French-Canadian wife Mignonne, who becomes involved with the Front de libération du Québec after a chance meeting with two young activists, Julie and François.

== Cast ==
The cast includes:

- Anthony Therrien as Jean Corbo
- Tony Nardi as Nicola Corbo
- Karelle Tremblay as Julie
- Antoine L'Écuyer as François
- Marie Brassard as Mignonne Corbo
- Jean-François Pronovost as Jean’s brother
- Dino Tavarone as Achille Corbo
- Francis Ducharme as Mathieu
- Simon Pigeon as Jacques
- Maxime Mailloux as Alain
- Laurent-Christophe De Ruelle as Louis
- Jean-François Poulin as Robert
- Stéphane Demers as Professeur Lacasse

== Production ==
The film was written and directed by Mathieu Denis and produced by Félize Frappier. Filming took place in Montreal and the surrounding area from 3 September to mid-October 2013. The film had an approximate budget of C$4.1 million.

== Release ==
The film had its world premiere at the 2014 Toronto International Film Festival, where it was shown in the Discovery section. It was released in theatres on 17 April 2015.

== Reception ==
=== Awards and nominations ===
The film received three Canadian Screen Award nominations at the 4th Canadian Screen Awards in 2016: Best Motion Picture, Best Supporting Actor for Tony Nardi, and Best Costume Design for Judy Jonker. It also received ten Jutra Award nominations at the 18th Jutra Awards, and was shortlisted for the Prix collégial du cinéma québécois in 2016.

=== Critical response ===
The Hollywood Reporter wrote that the film had a “slightly airless quality”, and that the “fervor” needed to explain Corbo’s move from distributing FLQ newspapers to involvement in the group’s violent actions was “largely undetectable”. The review called Steve Asselin’s cinematography “a standout”. The Film Stage called the film “beautifully shot” and “brilliantly acted”, and wrote that its gradual pace increased the story’s “emotionality and tragedy”.

== Festival screenings ==
In 2014, the film was screened at the Atlantic Film Festival, the Vancouver International Film Festival, the International Film Festival of India in Goa, and the Windsor International Film Festival, and was included in Canada’s Top Ten. In 2015, it screened in the Generation section of the Berlin International Film Festival.
