= Footprints (2015 film) =

2015 Canadian documentary film

- French: L'Empreinte
- Directed by: Yvan Dubuc; Carole Poliquin
- Written by: Carole Poliquin
- Produced by: Carole Poliquin
- Starring: Roy Dupuis
- Cinematography: Julien Fontaine
- Edited by: Annie Jean
- Music by: Jorane
- Production company: Les Productions ISCA
- Release date: March 13, 2015
- Running time: 86 minutes
- Country: Canada
- Language: French

Footprints (French: L'Empreinte) is a Canadian documentary film, directed by Yvan Dubuc and Carole Poliquin and released in 2015. The film follows actor Roy Dupuis on an exploration of the profound impact of First Nations on the culture and society of Quebec.

The film premiered theatrically in March 2015, and was broadcast by Télévision de Radio-Canada in June as an episode of the documentary series 1001 vies.

The film was a Prix Iris nominee for Best Documentary Film at the 18th Quebec Cinema Awards in 2016.
