= This House (film) =

2022 Canadian film directed by Miryam Charles

- French: Cette maison
- Directed by: Miryam Charles
- Written by: Miryam Charles
- Produced by: Félix Dufour-Laperrière
- Starring: Schelby Jean-Baptiste; Florence Blain Mbaye
- Cinematography: Miryam Charles; Isabelle Stachtchenko
- Edited by: Xi Feng
- Music by: Romain Camiolo
- Production company: L'Embuscade Films
- Distributed by: Tape; La Distributrice des films
- Release date: February 13, 2022 (Berlin)
- Running time: 75 minutes
- Country: Canada
- Languages: French; Haitian Creole

This House (French: Cette maison) is a Canadian drama film, directed by Miryam Charles and released in 2022. Based around the suspicious death of her teenage cousin Tessa in 2008, the film examines the event's impact on her family through a blend of documentary footage with a scripted drama in which an adult version of Tessa (Schelby Jean-Baptiste) continues to interact with her grieving mother Valeska (Florence Blain Mbaye) in a liminal space between life and death.

The film's cast also includes Ève Duranceau, Nadine Jean, Yardly Kavanagh, Mireille Métellus and Matthew Rankin.

The film premiered in the Forum program at the 72nd Berlin International Film Festival on February 13, and had its Canadian premiere at the Hot Docs Canadian International Documentary Festival in April.

The film was longlisted for the Directors Guild of Canada's 2022 Jean-Marc Vallée DGC Discovery Award. It was named to the Toronto International Film Festival's annual year-end Canada's Top Ten list for 2022.
