= Felix and Meira =

2014 film directed by Maxime Giroux

- Film poster
- Directed by: Maxime Giroux
- Written by: Maxime Giroux; Alexandre Laferrière
- Produced by: Sylvain Corbeil; Nancy Grant
- Starring: Martin Dubreuil; Hadas Yaron; Luzer Twersky; Anne-Élisabeth Bossé
- Cinematography: Sara Mishara
- Edited by: Mathieu Bouchard-Malo
- Music by: Olivier Alary
- Production company: Metafilms
- Distributed by: Funfilm
- Release date: 7 September 2014 (TIFF)
- Running time: 105 minutes
- Country: Canada
- Languages: Yiddish; English; French

Felix and Meira (French: Félix et Meira) is a 2014 Canadian drama film directed by Maxime Giroux, and starring Martin Dubreuil, Hadas Yaron, and Luzer Twersky. It is about an improbable affair between two Montreal residents—one a married woman from a devoutly Jewish family and community, and the other a single French Canadian man with his own family issues.

The film premiered in the Contemporary World Cinema section at the 2014 Toronto International Film Festival, where it won the Award for Best Canadian Film. It received numerous other film festival awards, and was nominated for five Canadian Screen Awards, including Best Motion Picture.

== Plot ==
In Mile End, Montreal, a Hasidic Jewish woman named Meira lives a repressed life, married to Shulem, who does not allow her to listen to secular music. They have a young daughter named Elishiva, but Meira confides in her friend that she does not want any more children, despite their religious duty. Word reaches Shulem, who berates Meira for shaming the small family. By chance, Meira meets Félix, a French Canadian man who has just lost his father Théodore, who at the end of his life no longer knew Félix was his son. Meira is mystified by the fact that Félix has no children, as he is single, a novel concept for her, since she comes from a culture where women have as many as 20 children. She avoids eye contact with him, and becomes enraged when, while they are playing Ping-Pong, Félix's sister Caroline unexpectedly arrives and sees her.

Félix and Meira go out dancing. Caroline also informs Félix that their mother had an affair, drawing parallel to Félix's interest in a married woman. Eventually, Shulem sees Félix and Meira walking on a street together, rushes up behind them, and begins slapping Félix.

Later, Shulem visits Félix in his apartment, informing him that if Meira and Félix re-unite, Meira will never be allowed to return to the Hasidic community. Shulem also asks Félix to keep Meira safe and cared for. Before leaving, Shulem notices a folded-up piece of paper, that Félix says was written by Théodore and never read. Shulem reads it, revealing Théodore apologized for bullying Félix to conform to the family, where he never felt comfortable. Félix and Meira take Elishiva to Venice.

== Cast ==
- Martin Dubreuil as Félix
- Hadas Yaron as Meira
- Luzer Twersky as Shulem
- Anne-Élisabeth Bossé as Caroline
- Benoît Girard as Théodore
- Melissa Weisz as Ruth

== Production ==
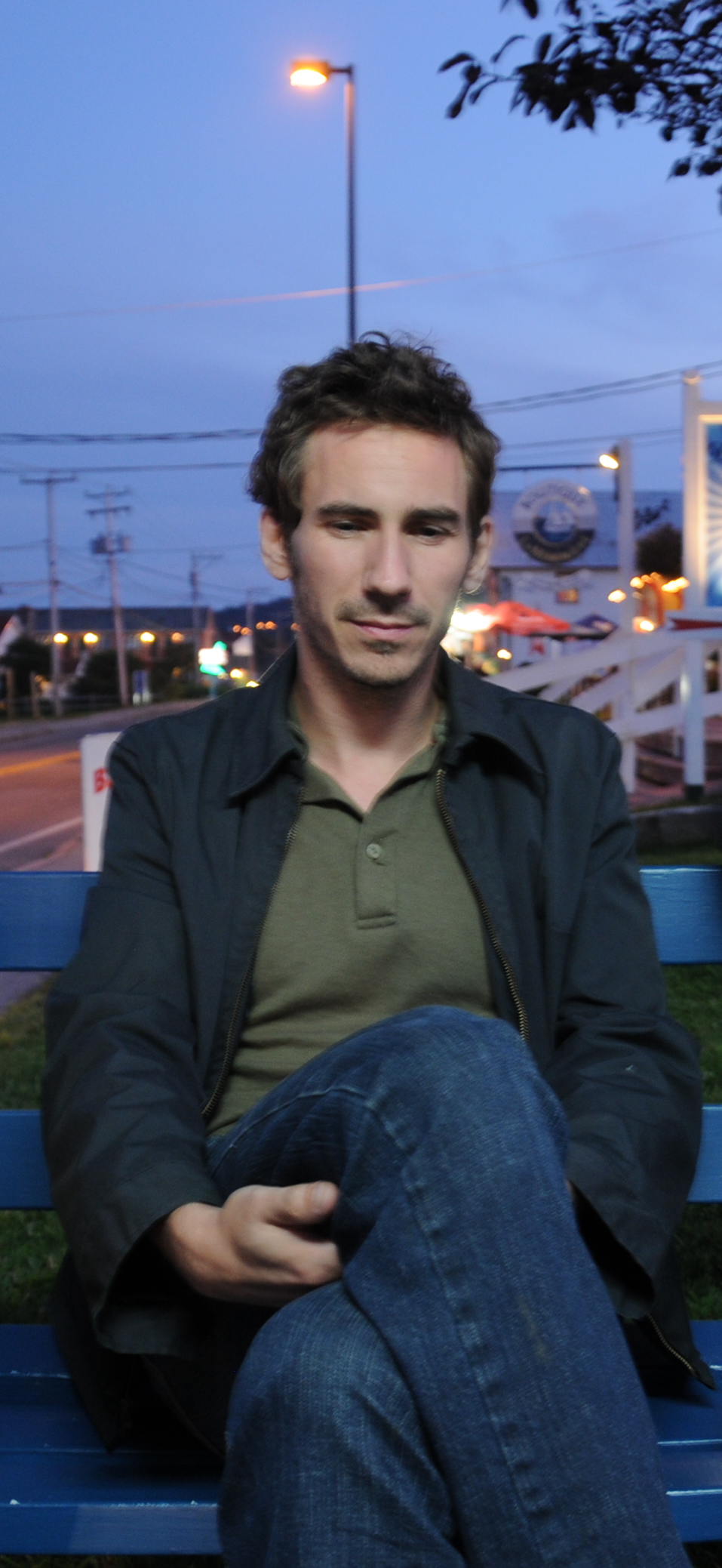
Screenwriter Alexandre Laferrière carried out much of the research for the film.

Felix and Meira was director Maxime Giroux's third full-length film, and he said that in writing and directing it, he learned more about his home of Montreal. Additionally, he said he lived near Hasidic Jews on Mile End, and knew it was particularly challenging for women to leave the culture. While meeting and discussing possible stories with co-writer Alexandre Laferrière at cafes, Giroux said: "We'd see these women and men walking by, and we just didn't know anything about them." Laferrière did much of the research.

Giroux assembled a cast, including actors who were once Hasidic Jews, but later gave up that faith and culture. He commented: "It's their story in a way, and I know at some point, it was difficult for them to shoot some of the scenes because it was really close to what they lived in their lives. It's tough for them to re-invent themselves and have a new life in our society." It was challenging to cast Yiddish-speaking actors in Montreal, but in New York, several people pointed Giroux to Luzer Twersky, who they said would be interested. The producers recommended Hadas Yaron, but as she did not speak French or Yiddish, she had to study both languages, working on Yiddish with Twersky and on French in Israel.

== Release ==
Felix and Meira premiered in the Contemporary World Cinema section at the 2014 Toronto International Film Festival. It was also in competition at the San Sebastián International Film Festival, and at the Torino Film Festival. In January 2015, it screened at the New York Jewish Film Festival.

The film had a wider release in Quebec theatres on 30 January 2015, distributed by FunFilm, and had a limited release in the United States on 17 April 2015. It was released on DVD on 12 May 2015. By September 2015, the film had played in over 50 festivals and 15 countries.

== Reception ==
=== Critical response ===
The film received positive reviews, with a 76% approval rating on Rotten Tomatoes, based on 46 reviews, and an average rating of 6.6/10. The website's critical consensus states: "Félix & Meira uses its simple structure and slight story as the setup for a sensitive, well-acted romance whose unusual specifics belie universal truths". Metacritic assigned the film a weighted average score of 66 out of 100, based on 24 critics, indicating "generally favorable reviews". It was included in the list of "Canada's Top Ten" feature films of 2014, selected by a panel of film-makers and industry professionals organized by TIFF.

Marc-André Lussier wrote in La Presse that the film was not sensational, but subtle, sensitive, and highly interesting. Brendan Kelly, writing for The Montreal Gazette, gave the film four stars, praising it as "so powerful precisely because it's so under-stated".

Outside Canada, Joe McGovern of Entertainment Weekly gave it a B. Jeannette Catsoulis, writing for The New York Times, called it "a tenderly observed love story". Ty Burr wrote in The Boston Globe that the film avoided melodrama about cultural conflicts to focus on its characters, and criticized the Motion Picture Association of America for giving the film an R rating, though there is a scene where Meira watches a couple have sex. Variety's Peter Debruge said it was easy to root for Meira's liberation, but he was not satisfied with the ending. Conversely, Jordan Hoffman, of The New York Daily News, felt it lacked chemistry.

=== Accolades ===
The film was selected as the Canadian entry for the Best Foreign Language Film at the 88th Academy Awards, but it was not nominated. It was a rare Canadian submission for featuring a substantial amount of Yiddish as well as French.

Award	Date of ceremony	Category	Recipient(s)	Result	Ref(s)
Canadian Screen Awards	13 March 2016	Best Motion Picture	Sylvain Corbeil and Nancy Grant	Nominated	
Canadian Screen Awards	13 March 2016	Best Direction	Maxime Giroux	Nominated	
Canadian Screen Awards	13 March 2016	Best Actress	Hadas Yaron	Nominated	
Canadian Screen Awards	13 March 2016	Best Art Direction / Production Design	Louisa Schabas	Nominated	
Canadian Screen Awards	13 March 2016	Best Cinematography	Sara Mishara	Nominated	
Festival du nouveau cinéma	2014	Louve d'Or	Felix and Meira	Won	
Haifa International Film Festival	2014	Tobias Szpancer Award for Best Film	Maxime Giroux	Won	
Prix collégial du cinéma québécois	2016	Best Film	Felix and Meira	Nominated	
Quebec Cinema Awards	20 March 2016	Best Film	Sylvain Corbeil and Nancy Grant	Nominated	
Quebec Cinema Awards	20 March 2016	Best Director	Maxime Giroux	Nominated	
Quebec Cinema Awards	20 March 2016	Best Screenplay	Alexandre Laferrière and Maxime Giroux	Won	
Quebec Cinema Awards	20 March 2016	Best Actress	Hadas Yaron	Nominated	
Quebec Cinema Awards	20 March 2016	Best Supporting Actor	Luzer Twersky	Nominated	
Torino Film Festival	2014	Best Actress	Hadas Yaron	Won	
Torino Film Festival	2014	Best Actor	Luzer Twersky	Won	
Toronto International Film Festival	4–14 September 2014	Best Canadian Film	Maxime Giroux	Won	
Whistler Film Festival	2014	Borsos Award of Best Canadian Feature	Maxime Giroux	Won	
Whistler Film Festival	2014	Best Director of a Borsos Film	Maxime Giroux	Won	
Whistler Film Festival	2014	Best Screenplay of a Borsos Film	Maxime Giroux and Alexandre Laferrière	Won	
Whistler Film Festival	2014	Best Actor in Borsos Film	Hadas Yaron	Won	

== See also ==
- Twist of Faith (2013 film)
- List of submissions to the 88th Academy Awards for Best Foreign Language Film
- List of Canadian submissions for the Academy Award for Best Foreign Language Film
