= Gurov and Anna =

- Film poster
- Directed by: Rafaël Ouellet
- Written by: Céleste Parr
- Produced by: Jacques Blain; Marie-Dominique Michaud
- Starring: Andreas Apergis; Sophie Desmarais
- Cinematography: Geneviève Perron
- Edited by: David Di Francesco
- Production company: Zone3
- Distributed by: Filmoption
- Release date: October 4, 2014 (BIFF)
- Running time: 107 minutes
- Country: Canada
- Language: English

Gurov and Anna is a Canadian drama film, directed by Rafaël Ouellet and released in 2014. The film stars Andreas Apergis as Ben, a literature professor in Montreal who is obsessed with Anton Chekhov's short story "The Lady with the Dog", and begins trying to act it out in his real life by commencing a love affair with his student Mercedes (Sophie Desmarais) in which he can be the Gurov to her Anna.

The film went into production in March 2014. It was both Ouellet's first English-language film, and his first time directing a screenplay he had not written himself.

The film premiered in October 2014 at the 19th Busan International Film Festival, and had its Canadian premiere later in the month at the Festival du nouveau cinéma, before going into commercial release in early 2015.

Screenwriter Céleste Parr received a nomination for Best Screenplay at the 18th Quebec Cinema Awards in 2016.
