= The Fireflies Are Gone =

2018 Canadian film

- Film poster
- French: La disparition des lucioles
- Directed by: Sébastien Pilote
- Written by: Sébastien Pilote
- Produced by: Marc Daigle; Bernadette Payeur
- Starring: Pierre-Luc Brillant
- Cinematography: Michel La Veaux
- Edited by: Stéphane Lafleur
- Music by: Philippe Brault
- Production company: ACPAV
- Distributed by: Les Films Séville
- Release date: 30 June 2018 (Karlovy Vary IFF)
- Running time: 96 minutes
- Country: Canada
- Language: French

The Fireflies Are Gone (French: La disparition des lucioles) is a 2018 Canadian drama film directed by Sébastien Pilote. It was screened in the Contemporary World Cinema section at the 2018 Toronto International Film Festival, where it won the award for Best Canadian Film.

The film centres on Léo (Karelle Tremblay), a restless teenager in her final year of high school who strikes up a friendship with Steve (Pierre-Luc Brillant), an older man.

In December 2018, the Toronto International Film Festival named the film to its annual year-end Canada's Top Ten list. The film received two Canadian Screen Award nominations at the 7th Canadian Screen Awards in 2019, for Best Overall Sound (Gilles Corbeil and Stéphane Bergeron) and Best Original Score (Philippe Brault).

== Cast ==
- Pierre-Luc Brillant
- Marie-France Marcotte
- François Papineau
- Luc Picard
- Karelle Tremblay
