= Anna (2015 Canadian film) =

- Directed by: Charles-Olivier Michaud
- Written by: Charles-Olivier Michaud
- Produced by: Nicole Robert
- Starring: Anna Mouglalis; Pierre-Yves Cardinal; Pascale Bussières
- Cinematography: Jean-François Lord
- Edited by: Glenn Berman; Charles-Olivier Michaud
- Music by: Michel Corriveau
- Production company: Go Films
- Distributed by: Les Films Séville
- Release dates: October 2, 2015 (Busan); October 23, 2015 (Canada)
- Running time: 109 minutes
- Country: Canada
- Language: French

Anna is a 2015 Canadian drama film written and directed by Charles-Olivier Michaud. The film stars Anna Mouglalis as Anna, a journalist working in Asia to expose a human trafficking ring who is herself abducted by the traffickers.

The film garnered two Canadian Screen Award nominations at the 4th Canadian Screen Awards in 2016, for Best Original Score (Michel Corriveau) and Best Make-Up (Catherine Beaudoin). At the 18th Quebec Cinema Awards, Corriveau and Beaudoin were both nominated in the equivalent categories, and Mouglalis was nominated for Best Actress.

== Synopsis ==
Anna (Anna Mouglalis), a photojournalist, travels to Bangkok in order to pursue her investigations of a news story on human trafficking rings run by the city's triad gangs. While investigating, she herself is then kidnapped by Triad gangsters and subjected to the same abuse endured by the women she has interviewed and photographed. She awakens in a Montreal hospital where these brutal recollections are relayed to her, after a lengthy passing of time. Scarred for life and obsessed by her desire for revenge, Anna embarks on a dark journey where violence beckons at every turn, however; the impact provoked by her investigations will prove to be more important than the satisfaction of her own quest for vengeance.

== Cast ==
- Anna Mouglalis as Anna
- Pierre-Yves Cardinal as Samuel
- Pascale Bussières as Sophie
- Catherine St-Laurent as Waitress
- Fred Nguyen as Bodyguard
- Xiao Sun as Xiao
- Igor Ovadis as Igor
- Ben Holmquist as Will

== Release ==
The film premiered at the 20th Busan International Film Festival in South Korea which was held from October 1 to October 10, 2015.

The film had its local opening, in Montreal, Canada, at the Festival du Nouveau Cinema on October 13, 2015. It later opened commercially on October 23, 2015.

== Reception ==
=== Critical response ===
There were only a few published reviews for Anna at the time of release.

Charles-Henri Ramond, writer for Films du Québec, gave the film a mixed review with a rating of 2.5 stars out of 5 in a review written in French. He comments on the chilling first half hour of the film, wherein he applauds the films attempt to bring awareness to the issue of human trafficking through the brutal and horrific representation of the accounts given by the trafficking victims. However, he writes that the second half of the film begins to slow significantly in pace, and comments on how Anna's character is too easily able to find solutions within the plot. The use of a revenge motive drives the plot away from its original intent to highlight the exploitation of Asian women in East Asia. Writing on Anna Mouglalis' performance, Ramond explains that her rugged voice and use of violence befit the character, however she ultimately fails to convince in her performance.

=== Accolades ===
==== Won ====
- Los Angeles Independent Film Festival Awards (2016) - Michel Corriveau - Best Original Music Score

==== Nominated ====
- 18th Quebec Cinema Awards (2016) - Anna Mouglalis - Best Actress
- 18th Quebec Cinema Awards (2016) - Catherine Beaudoin - Best Makeup
- 4th Canadian Screen Awards (2016) - Catherine Beaudoin - Achievement in Makeup
- 4th Canadian Screen Awards (2016) - Michel Corriveau - Achievement in Music (Original Score)
