= Karelle Tremblay =

Canadian actress

- Born: 1996 (age 29–30)

Karelle Tremblay is a Canadian film and television actress from Quebec. Tremblay received a Canadian Screen Award nomination for Best Actress at the 4th Canadian Screen Awards in 2016 for Our Loved Ones (Les Êtres chers).

She has also appeared in the films Amsterdam, Corbo, King Dave, Oh What a Wonderful Feeling, The Fireflies Are Gone (La disparution des lucioles), Flashwood, You Will Remember Me (Tu te souviendras de moi), Death of a Ladies' Man and Death Does Not Exist (La mort n'existe pas), and the television series Le Club des doigts croisés, 19-2, Jérémie and Anna Comes Home (Le retour d'Anna Brodeur).

Tremblay was for a while in a relationship with Franco-Ontarian stand-up comic Katherine Levac.
