= Catherine De Léan =

Canadian actress (born 1980)

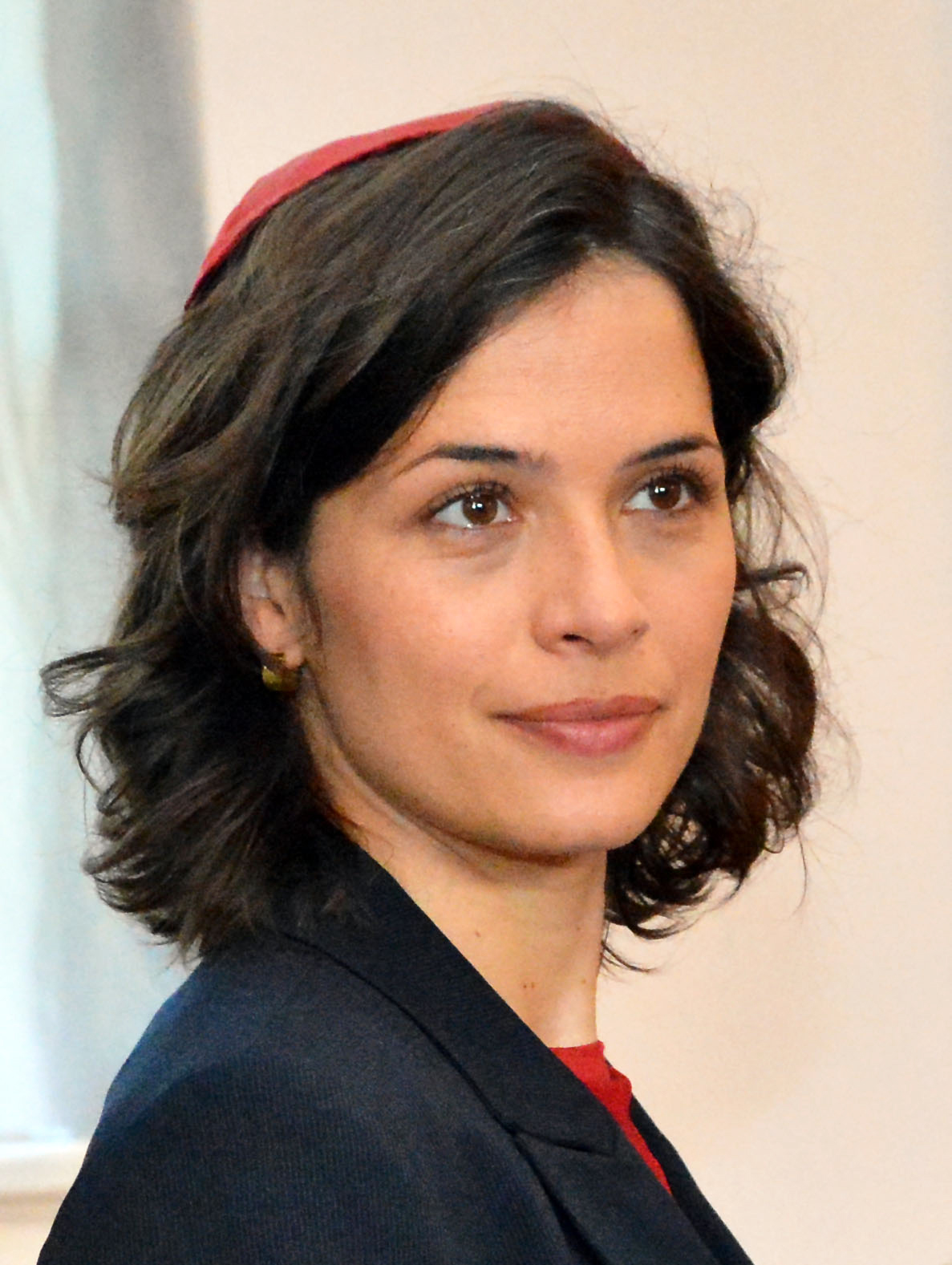
- Catherine De Léan in 2015
- Born: 27 April 1980 (age 45)
- Occupation: Actress

Catherine De Léan (born April 27, 1980) is a Canadian actress. She is most noted for her role in the film Nuit #1, for which she was a Genie Award nominee for Best Actress at the 32nd Genie Awards in 2012.

She has appeared in other films and television roles, including Les Hauts et les bas de Sophie Paquin, Trauma, The Secret Life of Happy People (La Vie secrète des gens heureux), Le Banquet, A Kid (Le Fils de Jean), Confessions of a Hitman (Confessions), Echo to Delta (Écho à Delta), District 31 and Gaby's Hills (Gaby les collines). She has also acted in stage roles.
