= Irdens Exantus =

Canadian actor

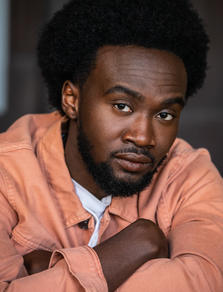
- Occupation: Actor

Irdens Exantus is a Canadian actor. He is most noted for his performance as Souverain in the 2015 film My Internship in Canada (Guibord s'en va-t-en guerre), for which he received a Canadian Screen Award nomination for Best Supporting Actor at the 4th Canadian Screen Awards, and won the Quebec Cinema Award for Best Supporting Actor at the 18th Quebec Cinema Awards.

My Internship in Canada was his first film role. He has also appeared in the feature films 1:54 and François.e.

On stage, he has appeared in productions of Fanny Britt's Mourir and Michel Garneau's Les neiges.

His younger brother Stanley is also an actor, best known for his supporting role in the television series Lakay Nou. They starred together in the 2025 short film Platanero.

In 2025 he was announced as having a supporting role in the upcoming television series adaptation of Bon Cop, Bad Cop.

He played the role of Xavier Augustin in season 1 of Les Armes in 2024. In 2025, he joined the main cast of the series Antigang.
