= Schelby Jean-Baptiste =

Canadian actress

Schelby Jean-Baptiste is a Canadian actress. She is most noted for her performance in the 2015 film Scratch, for which she was a nominee for Best Supporting Actress at the 18th Quebec Cinema Awards in 2016.

She has also appeared in the films Speak Love, There Are No False Undertakings (Il n'y a pas de faux métier), The Greatest Country in the World (Le meilleur pays du monde), This House (Cette maison) and No Ghost in the Morgue, and the television series Trauma, Unité 9, The Wall and Je voudrais qu'on m'efface.
