= Festival Vues dans la tête de... =

The Festival Vues dans la tête de... is a Canadian film festival, staged annually in Rivière-du-Loup, Quebec. Held at the city's Cinéma Princesse over several days in February each year, the festival selects one filmmaker annually to serve as a patron and programmer; the festival typically opens with one of the lead filmmaker's own films, with the program for the rest of the event consisting of a selection of other narrative, documentary and short films by Quebec filmmakers, selected by the lead filmmaker to provide various perspectives on a theme of interest.

== Filmmakers ==
- Hugo Latulippe (2013)
- Sébastien Pilote (2014)
- Stéphane Lafleur (2015)
- Micheline Lanctôt (2016)
- Anne Émond (2017)
- Francis Leclerc (2018)
- Kim Nguyen (2019)
- Myriam Verreault (2020)
- Jeanne Leblanc (2021)
- Maxime Giroux (2022)
- Robert Morin (2023)
- Pascal Plante (2024)
- Sophie Deraspe (2025)
- Ricardo Trogi (2026)
