= Kevin Parent =

Canadian musician

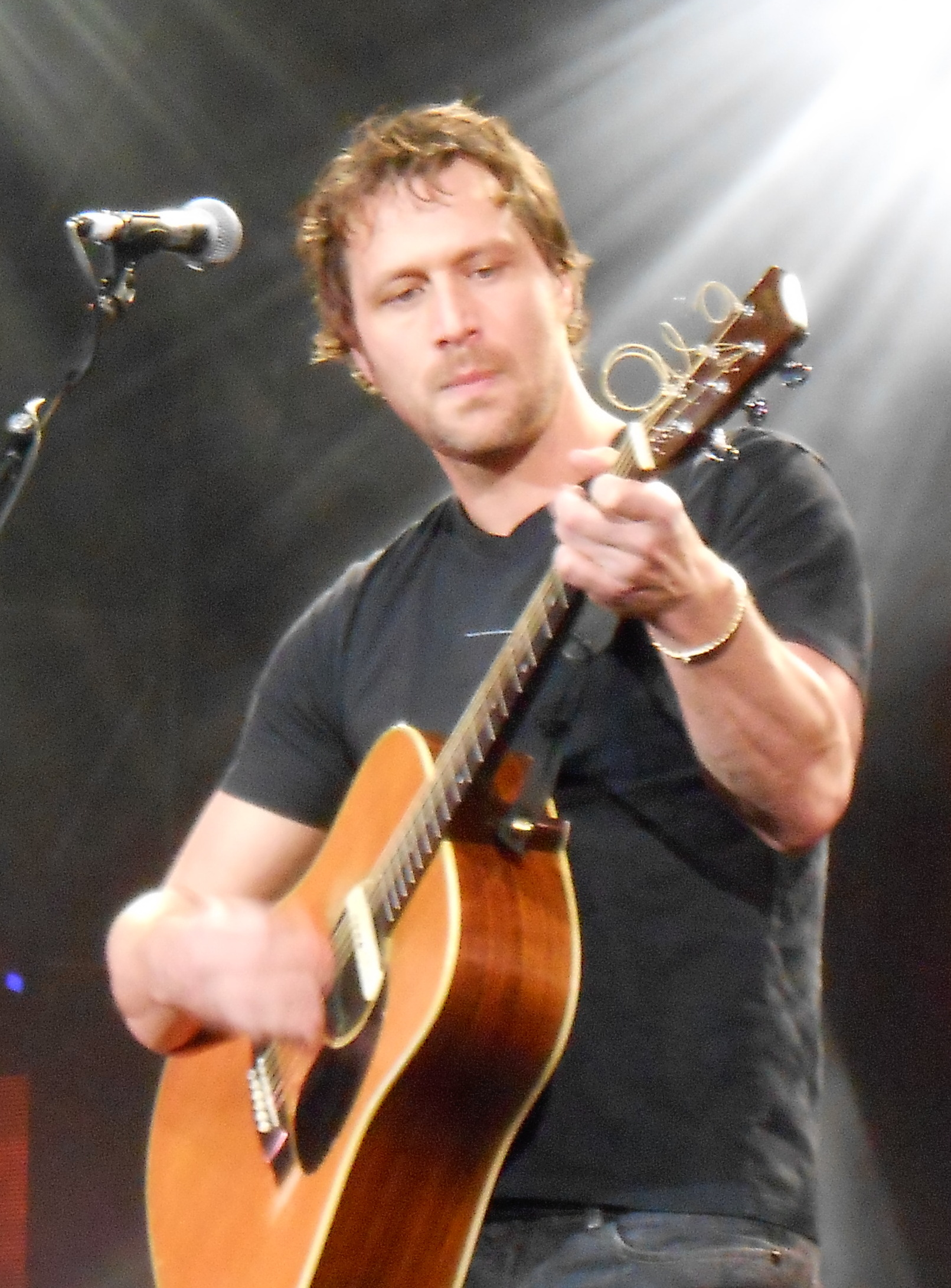
- Parent in 2013

Background information
- Born: 12 December 1972 (age 53); Greenfield Park, Quebec, Canada
- Years active: 1993–present
- Label: Audiogram
- Website: kevinparent.ca

Kevin Parent (born 12 December 1972) is a Canadian singer-songwriter and actor from Québec. He is fluent in both English and French.

== Early life ==
Although his first language is English, he was born in Greenfield Park, Quebec (now a borough of the city of Longueuil), and was raised and educated in the French-speaking area of Chaleur Bay (Gaspé Peninsula) in the municipality of Nouvelle during his childhood and attended high school at the École Antoine-Bernard in Carleton-sur-Mer.

== Career ==
In 1993, Parent participated in a songwriting competition, and was consequently signed to Tacca Musique shortly thereafter. His first album, "Pigeon d'argile" sold over 360,000 copies, making it one of the greatest Québécois album sales successes of the decade.

Hit singles "Nomade sedentaire", "Seigneur" and "Boomerang", made Parent become well known in Quebec music in the 1990s, winning a number of Felix Awards in the province and touring on both sides of the Atlantic. Two years later, Kevin released "Grand Parleur, Petit Faiseur", which also sold more than 350,000 copies and earned him the Felix Award for Rock Album of the Year in 1998. His follow-up albums, Les Vents ont changé (2001) and Retrouvailles (2003), which featured collaborations with Claire Pelletier, Catherine Durand, among others, both achieved multi-platinum status and earned him Juno Award nominations (including a win for the best selling Francophone album of 2002) and Felix Awards.

Parent has also worked as an actor, with acting roles including in Jean-Marc Vallée's 2011 film Café de Flore and Sonia Boileau's 2019 film Rustic Oracle. In 2015 he appeared in and narrated the documentary film L'Or du golfe.

He now lives in the town of Nouvelle, close to Miguasha nationale park. Miguasha is also the title of one album he published in 2009.

== Discography ==
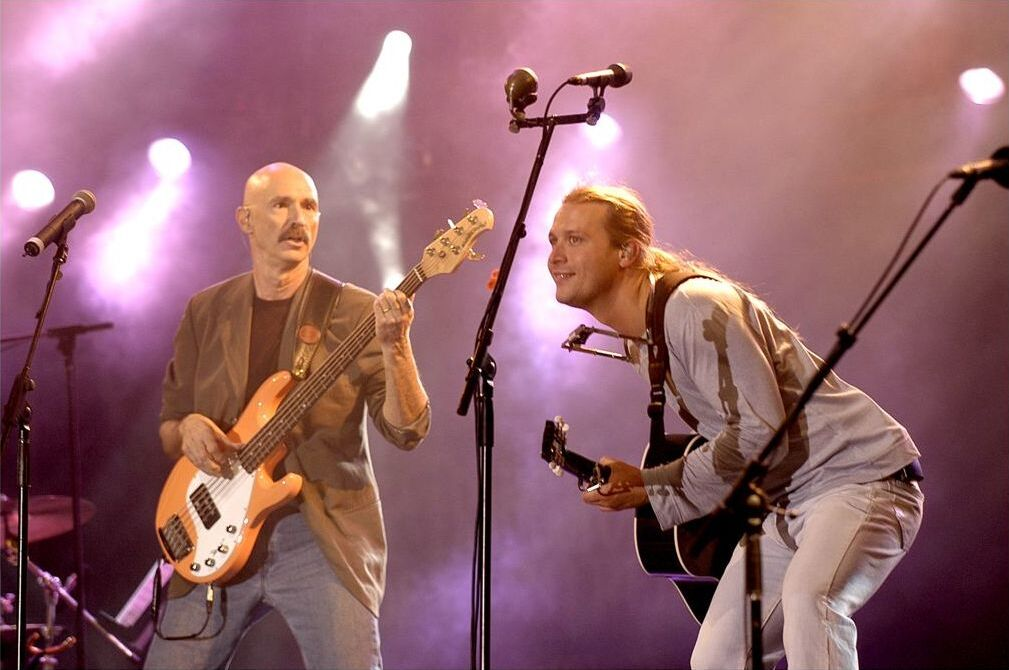
Parent (right) with Tony Levin

- 1995: Pigeon d'argile
- 1998: Grand parleur, petit faiseur
- 2001: Les vents ont changé
- 2003: Retrouvailles
- 2007: Fangless Wolf Facing Winter – English album
- 2009: Miguasha
- 2014: Face à l'ouest
- 2016: Kanji – English album

=== Compilation ===
- 2006: Kevin Parent Compilation
