= L'Or du golfe =

2015 Canadian documentary film

- Directed by: Ian Jaquier
- Written by: Ian Jaquier
- Produced by: Denis McCready
- Starring: Kevin Parent
- Cinematography: Julien Fontaine
- Edited by: Alexandre Leblanc
- Music by: Philippe Brault; Kevin Parent
- Production company: Laterna Films
- Distributed by: Production du Rapide Blanc
- Release date: February 9, 2015 (RVCQ)
- Running time: 91 minutes
- Country: Canada
- Language: French

L'Or du golfe (lit. "Gold of the Gulf") is a Canadian documentary film, directed by Ian Jaquier and released in 2015. The film follows musician Kevin Parent as he lobbies against petroleum exploration in the Gaspé Peninsula and the Gulf of St. Lawrence.

The film premiered in February 2015 at the Rendez-vous du cinéma québécois, before going into limited commercial release and being broadcast by Télévision de Radio-Canada in June.

The film was a Prix Iris nominee for Best Documentary Film at the 18th Quebec Cinema Awards in 2016.
