= My Internship in Canada =

- French: Guibord s'en va-t-en guerre
- Directed by: Philippe Falardeau
- Written by: Philippe Falardeau
- Produced by: Luc Déry; Kim McCraw
- Starring: Patrick Huard; Irdens Exantus; Suzanne Clément; Paul Doucet
- Cinematography: Ronald Plante
- Edited by: Richard Comeau
- Music by: Martin Léon
- Production company: micro_scope
- Distributed by: Les Films Christal
- Release date: August 10, 2015 (Locarno)
- Running time: 108 minutes
- Country: Canada
- Languages: French; English; Haitian Creole

My Internship in Canada (French: Guibord s'en va-t-en guerre, lit. "Guibord Goes to War") is a Canadian political satire film written and directed by Philippe Falardeau. The film premiered in 2015 at the Locarno International Film Festival.

The film was nominated for four Canadian Screen Awards, and won three awards at the 18th Quebec Cinema Awards. It was also part of the Canada's Top Ten screening series of the 2015 Toronto International Film Festival.

The film stars Patrick Huard as Steve Guibord, an independent, moderate Member of Parliament for the northern Quebec electoral district of Prescott–Makadewa–Rapides-aux-Outardes, who unexpectedly finds himself in the position of becoming the tie-breaking voter on whether Canada will go to war in the Middle East. Embarking on a tour of his constituency to evaluate public opinion, various lobby groups and Canada's Prime Minister spin the debate further and further out of control.

Guibord's confusion and eventual national tour is documented by Souverain (Irdens Exantus), his Haitian immigrant intern, who often calls his mother (and an increasing audience of passers-by) with updates on the situation.

== Plot ==
Steve Guibord is a former junior hockey star who abandoned a promising NHL career because of his fear of flying. He now lives in the northern Quebec town of Rapides-aux-Outardes with his wife, Suzanne, who operates a garden centre, and their daughter, Lune, and is an independent MP for the huge, but sparsely populated riding of Prescott–Makadewà–Rapides-aux-Outardes. He has little interest in national politics but is focused on local issues. Despite the vast distances between the communities in his riding, he travels only by car.

Souverain Pascal is a young Haitian man who arrives to work for Steve as an intern. While in Canada, he is in constant touch by Skype with family and friends, and increasing numbers of interested passers-by, in Haiti, reporting on events in which he is involved.

The Prime Minister announces his intention to ask for Parliament's authorization to send Canadian troops to a war in the Middle East. Steve plans to abstain from voting, arguing that he is undecided and that his vote would make no difference: the governing Conservative Party has a one-vote majority in the House of Commons. Then it is reported that the Conservative MP for Peace Valley will be abstaining from the vote, which means that Steve will have the deciding vote. He must decide how to vote while facing pressure from Suzanne to vote for the war and from Lune to vote against it.

Souverain suggests that Steve consult his constituents directly to determine what they think, and Steve announces that he will do so. Before he can start, however, the Prime Minister calls him to a meeting in Ottawa and offers him a Cabinet position in exchange for his vote; the Prime Minister says the MP for Peace Valley is actually unable to vote because of a minor health issue. When Steve says he has already promised to consult his constituents, the Prime Minister tells him to go ahead with the consultation and says his office will "take care" of things.

Steve embarks on a tour of local communities, but the process is almost immediately hijacked. The Prime Minister has the mayor of Rapides-aux-Outardes tell the assembly that the federal government would be making purchases during a war, suggesting that this would mean jobs for the town's residents and convincing the attendees to support the war. In Prescott, anti-war activists from outside the riding take over the meeting by paying a local man who lost a leg fighting in Afghanistan to speak at it.

Souverain asks journalist Stéphanie Caron-Lavallée to investigate the real reason for the Conservative MP's inability to vote; if her illness is more serious than reported, the Conservatives would be placed in a minority situation and the Prime Minister would face a possible non-confidence vote. Stéphanie learns that the MP is in fact in a coma and will therefore be unable to participate in subsequent votes. This means that even if Steve votes against the war, the Prime Minister will need his support to stay in power.

As Steve rushes with Souverain and Lune to get to Ottawa for the vote, the mayor of Rapides-aux-Outardes sets up a roadblock to prevent him from getting there on time. They have to travel by canoe to a dock where Suzanne is waiting for Steve, but she says he will not be able to travel by road because there are other protests along the way. He has no choice but to go to Ottawa by air with Souverain, barely overcoming his fear of flying. After Steve tells the press he will be voting against the war, the Prime Minister arrives pushing a barely conscious MP for Peace Valley in a wheelchair and saying she is there to vote for the war. Steve and Souverain walk away together.

Back in Haiti, Souverain announces that Steve has asked him to serve as his advisor in an upcoming election.

== Cast ==
- Patrick Huard as Steve Guibord
- Irdens Exantus as Souverain Pascal
- Suzanne Clément as Suzanne
- Clémence Dufresne-Deslières as Lune
- Sonia Cordeau as Stéphanie Caron-Lavallée
- Paul Doucet as the Prime Minister of Canada
- Jules Philip as Maire
- Dangelo Néard as Optimiste
- Robin Aubert as Rodrigue
- Ellen David as Allison
- Micheline Lanctôt as Mairesse
- Alexis Martin as Advisor to the Prime Minister of Canada
- Paul Ahmarani as Professor Amin

== Production ==
The film was shot from 24 September to 10 November 2014 in Val-d'Or, the Abitibi-Témiscamingue region, Ottawa, and Haiti.

== Accolades ==
The film had its North American premiere at the 2015 Toronto International Film Festival, where it received an honourable mention from the Canadian film jury. It was released in the province of Quebec on 2 October 2015, on seven screens, with a wide release in the province on 9 October 2015. In December, the film was announced as part of TIFF's annual Canada's Top Ten screening series of the ten best Canadian films of the year. In January 2016, it won the Canada's Top Ten Film Festival People's Choice Award, voted on by audiences in Toronto.

The film garnered four Canadian Screen Award nominations at the 4th Canadian Screen Awards in 2016, including Best Picture, Best Supporting Actor (Irdens Exantus), Best Original Screenplay (Philippe Falardeau) and Best Sound (Bernard Gariépy Strobl, Daniel Bisson, Claude La Haye and Benoît Leduc). For the 18th Quebec Cinema Awards (formerly known as the Prix Jutra), it won Best Supporting Actor (Exantus), Best Original Score and Best Editing.

It was shortlisted for the Prix collégial du cinéma québécois in 2016.

In 2023, Barry Hertz of The Globe and Mail named the film as one of the 23 best Canadian comedy films ever made.
