= Our Loved Ones =

- Theatrical poster
- Les êtres chers
- Directed by: Anne Émond
- Written by: Anne Émond
- Produced by: Sylvain Corbeil; Nancy Grant
- Starring: Maxim Gaudette; Karelle Tremblay; Valérie Cadieux; Mickael Gouin
- Cinematography: Mathieu Laverdière
- Edited by: Mathieu Bouchard-Malo
- Music by: Martin Léon
- Production company: Metafilms
- Distributed by: Les Films Séville
- Release date: August 12, 2015 (Locarno)
- Running time: 102 minutes
- Country: Canada
- Language: French

Our Loved Ones (French: Les êtres chers) is a 2015 Canadian drama film, directed by Anne Émond and starring Maxim Gaudette and Karelle Tremblay. The story centres on a family whose patriarch committed suicide in 1978, and explores the continuing emotional impact of his death on his now-adult son David (Gaudette) and David's daughter Laurence (Tremblay).

The film was shot around Bas-Saint-Laurent. It received positive reviews and was nominated for seven Canadian Screen Awards, including Best Motion Picture.

== Plot ==
In 1978, a young man named David returns to his home only to be told that his father has died of an apparent medical episode. David inherits his tools, and begins using them to make marionettes, eventually turning this hobby into a business. He raises a family, including a daughter named Laurence. Spoiling his daughter and keeping her happy, he even buys her a live turkey named Simone for Christmas, after Laurence was disappointed that the turkey she won when her mother entered her name into a grocery store raffle was frozen for dinner.

Years later, David employs his grown daughter and brother in his marionette-making business, only for his brother to abuse his trust and leave. David is also upset to learn that his father had actually committed suicide in 1978, and that this fact was concealed from him. He has, in fact, inherited his father's depression. Later, Laurence is shocked when David retreats into the forest to kill himself, leaving behind a suicide letter. Gradually, she begins to cope.

== Cast ==
- Maxim Gaudette as David Leblanc
- Karelle Tremblay as Laurence Leblanc
- Valérie Cadieux as Marie
- Mickaël Gouin as André Leblanc
- Louise Turcot as Aline Leblanc
- Simon Landry-Desy as Félix
- Antoine Desrochers as Antoine

== Production ==
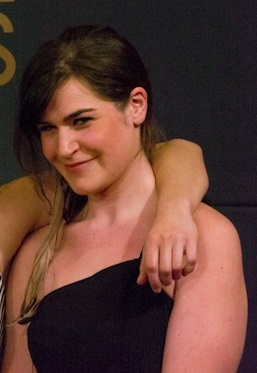
Anne Émond wrote the screenplay based on her experiences.

Director Anne Émond wrote the screenplay, saying she was readying herself to tell the story for 15 years and that it had parallels to hers. Her screenplay starts with a suicide set in 1978. She explained, "It’s not entirely autobiographical. There’s an enormous amount of fiction in the film. But I think if I chose to write a film that talks about suicide in this fashion, it’s tied to an experience that’s personal."

Émond was aware of actor Maxim Gaudette, but did not consider him for the main role until he auditioned. Gaudette viewed it as a chance to play a role different from his characters in Incendies and Polytechnique.

The film was shot in August and September 2014 in Montreal and Notre-Dame-du-Portage. A few scenes were shot in autumn 2014 in Barcelona, Spain. It was also shot in Saint-Roch-des-Aulnaies in the Bas-Saint-Laurent region.

== Release ==
The film premiered at the Locarno Film Festival in August 2015, and had its Canadian premiere at the 2015 Toronto International Film Festival. In December, the film was announced as part of TIFF's annual Canada's Top Ten screening series of the ten best Canadian feature films of the year.

The film had a wider theatrical release on 20 November 2015.

== Reception ==
=== Critical reception ===
In Canada, Brendan Kelly of The Montreal Gazette gave the film three and a half stars, saying the beginning displays "quite the mastery of cinematic storytelling" and the film is poignant, and complimented the use of the song "No Rain" by Blind Melon. Odile Tremblay of Le Devoir called the film beautiful and touching. In La Presse, Marc-André Lussier called it touching, sensitive and nostalgic. Conversely, Robert Bell of Exclaim! called it "astonishingly cold and dull for most of its runtime."

Joe Leydon, writing for Variety, complimented the film for "pitch-perfect performances and graceful storytelling." In The Hollywood Reporter, Boyd van Hoeij praised it as "an expansive, richly detailed family chronicle."

=== Accolades ===
Award	Date of ceremony	Category	Recipient(s)	Result	Ref(s)
Canadian Screen Awards	13 March 2016	Best Motion Picture	Sylvain Corbeil and Nancy Grant	Nominated	
Canadian Screen Awards	13 March 2016	Best Direction	Anne Émond	Nominated	
Canadian Screen Awards	13 March 2016	Best Original Screenplay	Anne Émond	Nominated	
Canadian Screen Awards	13 March 2016	Best Actor	Maxim Gaudette	Nominated	
Canadian Screen Awards	13 March 2016	Best Actress	Karelle Tremblay	Nominated	
Canadian Screen Awards	13 March 2016	Best Editing	Mathieu Bouchard-Malo	Nominated	
Canadian Screen Awards	13 March 2016	Best Original Song	Martin Léon for "Red and Yellow"	Nominated	
Quebec Cinema Awards	20 March 2016	Best Film	Sylvain Corbeil and Nancy Grant	Nominated	
Quebec Cinema Awards	20 March 2016	Best Director	Anne Émond	Nominated	
Quebec Cinema Awards	20 March 2016	Best Screenplay	Anne Émond	Nominated	
Quebec Cinema Awards	20 March 2016	Best Actor	Maxim Gaudette	Nominated	
Quebec Cinema Awards	20 March 2016	Best Art Direction	Éric Barbeau	Nominated	
Quebec Cinema Awards	20 March 2016	Best Editing	Mathieu Bouchard-Malo	Nominated	
Quebec Cinema Awards	20 March 2016	Best Hairstyling	Martin Lapointe	Nominated	
Toronto Film Critics Association	14 December 2015	Stella Artois Jay Scott Prize	Anne Émond	Won	
