= Scratch (2015 film) =

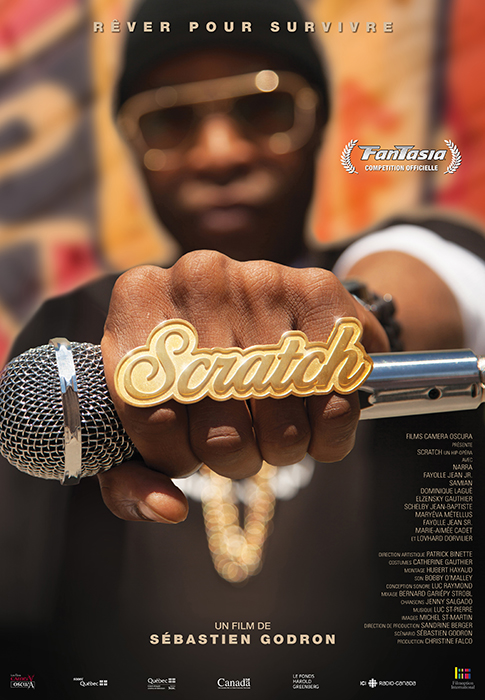
- Directed by: Sébastien Godron
- Written by: Sébastien Godron
- Produced by: Christine Falco
- Starring: Raphaël Joseph Lafond; Fayolle Jean Jr. Schelby Jean-Baptiste
- Cinematography: Michel St-Martin
- Edited by: Hubert Hayaud
- Music by: Jenny Salgado; Luc St-Pierre; André Courcy
- Production company: Camera Oscura
- Distributed by: Filmoption
- Release date: July 30, 2015
- Running time: 94 minutes
- Country: Canada
- Language: French

Scratch is a 2015 Canadian musical drama film from Quebec. The directorial debut of Sébastien Godron, the film centres on a family of Haitian Canadian immigrants in Montreal's Little Burgundy neighbourhood. The primary characters are Angelot/"Leslie" (Raphaël Joseph Lafond), an aspiring hip hop musician, and his brother Frantz (Fayolle Jean Jr.), a pimp who sets the film's events in motion when he is arrested and imprisoned.

The cast also includes Schelby Jean-Baptiste, Samian, Lovhard Dorvilliers, Dominique Laguë (vocal percussionist) and Fayolle Jean (Sr.).

At the 4th Canadian Screen Awards in 2016, Jenny Salgado won the award for Best Original Song, for "C’est aujourd’hui que je sors". At the 18th Quebec Cinema Awards, the film garnered nominations for Best Supporting Actress (Schelby Jean-Baptiste), Best Editing (Hubert Hayaud) and Best Original Music (Jenny Salgado, André Courcy and Luc St-Pierre).
