= Anne Émond =

Canadian film director and screenwriter

- Born: 1982 (age 43–44); Saint-Roch-des-Aulnaies, Quebec, Canada
- Occupations: Film director, screenwriter

Anne Émond (born 1982) is a French Canadian film director and screenwriter, currently based in Montreal, Quebec.

== Early life and education ==
Born in 1982, Anne Émond has lived and worked in Montreal since 2001. In 2005, she completed her undergraduate program in cinema at Université du Québec à Montréal (UQAM).

== Career ==
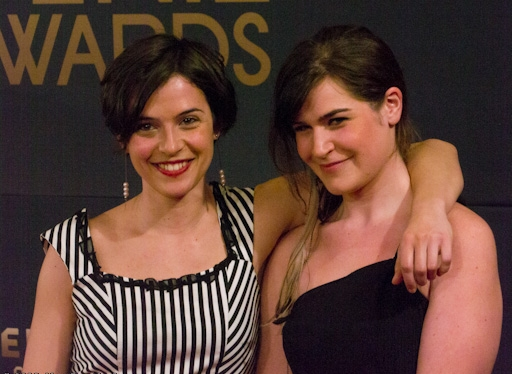
Émond with at the 32nd and final Genie Awards in 2012

Since then, she has written and directed seven short films including L'Ordre des choses (2009), Naissances (2009), Sophie Lavoie (2009) and Plus rien ne vouloir (2011). L'Ordre des choses won the Coop Vidéo Prize for Best Director in 2009 at the Rendez-vous du cinéma québécois. It was also nominated for the Claude Jutra Award. Naissances was chosen as one of the Toronto International Film Festival's top ten Canadian short films of 2009 and was nominated at the Brooklyn International Film Festival. Émond's short film Sophie Lavoie won the best short-film for the Festival du Nouveau Cinema.

Her debut feature film, Nuit #1, succeeded in cementing her personal style – a style characterized by long takes, theatrical monologues, and thematics such as youth loneliness and female sexuality. Émond won the Claude Jutra Award for the year's best feature film by a first-time director at the 2012 Genie Awards.

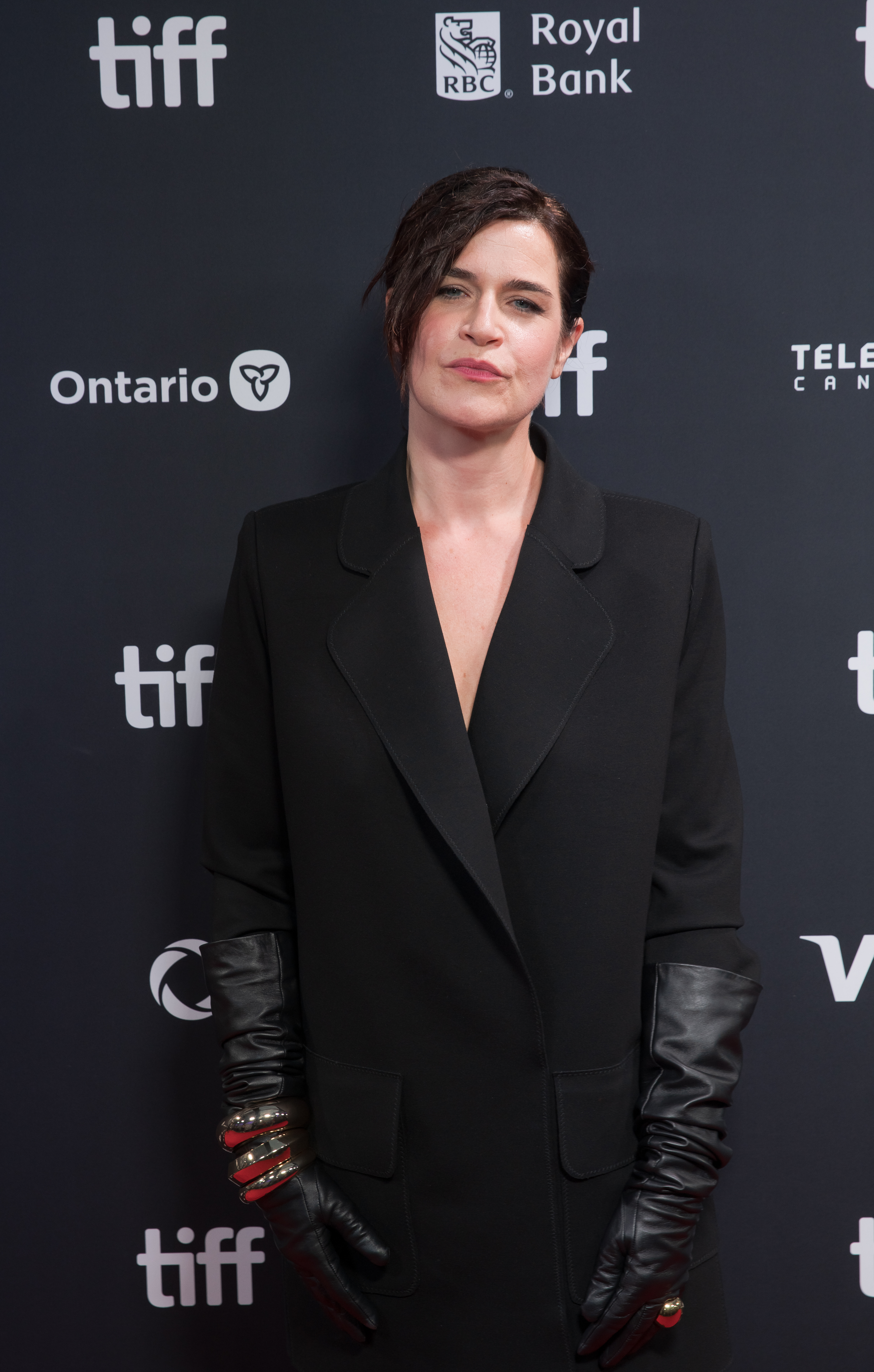
Émond at 2025 Toronto International Film Festival

Her second feature film, Our Loved Ones (Les êtres chers), premiered to positive reviews at the Locarno Film Festival in August 2015, and had its Canadian premiere at the 2015 Toronto International Film Festival. The story begins in 1978 in a small village on the Lower St. Lawrence, as the Leblanc family is rocked by the tragic death of Guy. In December, the film was announced as part of TIFF's annual Canada's Top Ten screening series of the ten best Canadian feature films of the year.

In 2016 Émond received the Stella Artois Jay Scott Prize, awarded to an emerging artist by the Toronto Film Critics Association, for Our Loved Ones. The film received seven Quebec Cinema Award nominations at the 18th Quebec Cinema Awards, for Best Film, Best Direction, Best Screenplay, Best Actor (Maxim Gaudette), Best Art Direction, Best Editing, and Best Hairstyling.

Her third film, Nelly is based on the life of Canadian novelist Nelly Arcan.

In 2017 she was the patron and curator of the Festival Vues dans la tête de... film festival in Rivière-du-Loup.

== Filmography ==
Year	Title	Notes
2000	Portes tourmentes	Short film
2005	Qualité de l'air	Short film
2006	Juillet	Short film
2008	Frédérique au centre	Short film, with Monia Chokri
2009	Le Temps pour la rêverie	Short film
2009	L'Ordre des choses	Short film
2009	Naissances	Short film
2009	Sophie Lavoie	Short film
2011	Plus rien ne vouloir	Short film
2011	Nuit #1	Debut feature film, with Catherine De Léan
2015	Our Loved Ones (Les êtres chers)	
2016	Nelly	Feature film, with Mylène Mackay
2019	Young Juliette (Jeune Juliette)	
2024	Lucy Grizzli Sophie	
2025	Peak Everything (Amour Apocalypse)	

== Awards and honors ==
- 2012: Claude Jutra Award for Best First Film, Nuit #1, Academy of Canadian Cinema and Television
- 23rd Palm Springs International Film Festival, USA, 2012
- 10th Pune International Film Festival, Inde, 2012
- 35th Göteborg International Film Festival, Suède, 2012
- 11th !F Istanbul International Independent Film Festival, Turkie, 2012
- 27th Guadalajara International Film Festival, Mexique, 2012
- 41st Rotterdam International Film Festival, Pays-Bas, 2012
- 15e Cinéma du Québec à Paris, France, 2011
- 31e Festival International du film d'Amiens, France, 2011
- 28e Festival international du film francophone de Tübingen, Stuttgart, Allemagne, 2011
- 45th Hof International Film Festival, Allemagne, 2011
- 40e Festival du nouveau cinéma, Montréal, Québec, 2011
- 16th Busan International Film Festival, Corée du Sud, 2011
- 36th Toronto International Film Festival, Canada, 2011
- 40e Festival du nouveau Cinéma à Montréal, Canada, 2011
- 2011: "Shaw Media Award, best canadian film, Nuit #1, Vancouver International Film Festival"
- Jury Price, Best Film - 25e Festival international du cinéma francophone en Acadie, Moncton
- Pyrénée Best Actress (Catherine De Léan) Festival international du Film de Pau / Cinéma Le Méliès
- Nomination Prix génie 2012 de l'Académie Canadienne du cinéma et de la télévision pour la meilleure actrice (Catherine De Léan)

== See also ==
- List of female film and television directors
- List of LGBT-related films directed by women
