= Maxime Giroux =

Canadian film director

Maxime Giroux (born 16 April 1976) is a film director from Quebec, Canada.

Giroux was born in Montreal, Quebec. He has directed several short films, videoclips and commercial videos. In 2006, his film The Days (Les Jours) won the prize for best short film at the Toronto International Film Festival, and in 2007 his film Red (Le Rouge au sol) won the award for Best Live Action Short Drama at the 27th Genie Awards.

His videography includes music videos for Sam Roberts, Sarah Harmer, The Dears, Pilate, Louise Forestier, Corneille, Marc Déry, Les Cowboys Fringants and Vulgaires Machins.

In October 2007, he began working on his first feature film, Tomorrow (Demain), which premiered at the Torino Film Festival in 2008 before going into commercial release in 2009.

In 2014, he directed Félix et Meira, which premiered at the 2014 Toronto International Film Festival, where it won the award for Best Canadian Feature Film.

In July 2021, it was announced that Giroux had signed on to direct his first English-language film, In Cold Light.

In 2022 he was the patron and curator of the Festival Vues dans la tête de... film festival in Rivière-du-Loup. The festival had been slated to host the premiere of his film Norbourg; however, the film was not screened at that time due to the organizers' decision in January to cancel the planned in-person screenings and shift to an online model in light of the continued COVID-19 pandemic in Quebec.

== Filmography ==
- Red (Le rouge au sol) - short, 2006
- The Days (Les Jours) - short, 2006
- Tomorrow (Demain) - 2008
- Jo for Jonathan (Jo pour Jonathan) - 2010
- Head Down (La tête en bas) - short, 2013
- Felix and Meira (Félix et Meira) - 2014
- The Great Darkened Days (La Grande noirceur) - 2018
- Norbourg - 2022
- Plan B - 2023
- In Cold Light - 2025
