= Prix Luc-Perreault =

The Prix Luc-Perreault, formerly known as the Prix L.-E.-Ouimet-Molson, is an annual Canadian film award, presented by the Association québécoise des critiques de cinéma to a film deemed to be the best film of the year from Quebec, from among the films screening at that year's Rendez-vous Québec Cinéma.

== Winners ==
=== 1970s ===
| Year | Film | Director | Ref |
|---|---|---|---|
| 1974 | Orders (Les Ordres) | Michel Brault | |
| 1975 | Ntesi Nana Shepen (On disait que c'était notre terre) | Arthur Lamothe | |
| 1976 | Little Tougas (Ti-Cul Tougas) | Jean-Guy Noël | |
| 1977 | 24 heures ou plus | Gilles Groulx | |
| 1978 | The Backstreet Six (Comme les six doigts de la main) | André Melançon | |
| 1979 | Blue Winter (L'Hiver bleu) | André Blanchard | |

=== 1980s ===
| Year | Film | Director | Ref |
|---|---|---|---|
| 1980 | A Wives' Tale (Une histoire de femmes) | Sophie Bissonnette, Martin Duckworth, Joyce Rock | |
| 1981 | The Plouffe Family (Les Plouffe) | Gilles Carle | |
| 1982 | Comfort and Indifference (Le Confort et l'indifférence) | Denys Arcand | |
| 1983 | The Ballad of Hard Times (La Turlute des années dures) | Richard Boutet, Pascal Gélinas | |
| 1984 | A Woman in Transit (La Femme de l'hôtel) | Léa Pool | |
| 1985 | Caffè Italia, Montréal | Paul Tana | |
| 1986 | The Decline of the American Empire (Le Déclin de l'empire américain) | Denys Arcand | |
| 1987 | Train of Dreams | John N. Smith | |
| 1988 | Kalamazoo | André Forcier | |
| 1989 | Lessons on Life (Trois pommes à côté du sommeil) | Jacques Leduc | |

=== 1990s ===
| Year | Film | Director | Ref |
|---|---|---|---|
| 1990 | The Moving Statue (La Liberté d'une statue) | Olivier Asselin | |
| 1991 | The Company of Strangers | Cynthia Scott | |
| 1992 | Requiem for a Handsome Bastard (Requiem pour un beau sans-cœur) | Robert Morin | |
| 1993 | Two Can Play (Deux actrices) | Micheline Lanctôt | |
| 1994 | Octobre | Pierre Falardeau | |
| 1995 | Rural Route 5 (Rang 5) | Richard Lavoie | |
| 1996 | The Human Plant (La Plante humaine) | Pierre Hébert | |
| 1997 | Tu as crié Let Me Go | Anne-Claire Poirier | |
| 1998 | Whoever Dies, Dies in Pain (Quiconque meurt, meurt à douleur) | Robert Morin | |
| 1999 | Post Mortem | Louis Bélanger | |

=== 2000s ===
| Year | Film | Director | Ref |
|---|---|---|---|
| 2000 | The Left-Hand Side of the Fridge (La Moitié gauche du frigo) | Philippe Falardeau | |
| 2001 | Marriages (Mariages) | Catherine Martin | |
| 2002 | Yellowknife | Rodrigue Jean | |
| 2003 | Gaz Bar Blues | Louis Bélanger | |
| 2004 | What Remains of Us (Ce qu'il reste de nous) | François Prévost, Hugo Latulippe | |
| 2005 | The Novena (La Neuvaine) | Bernard Émond | |
| 2006 | Congorama | Philippe Falardeau | |
| 2007 | Continental, a Film Without Guns (Continental, un film sans fusil) | Stéphane Lafleur | |
| 2008 | The Necessities of Life (Ce qu'il faut pour vivre) | Benoît Pilon | |
| 2009 | The Legacy (La Donation) | Bernard Émond | |

=== 2010s ===
| Year | Film | Director | Ref |
|---|---|---|---|
| 2010 | Curling | Denis Côté | |
| 2011 | The Salesman (Le Vendeur) | Sébastien Pilote | |
| 2012 | War Witch (Rebelle) | Kim Nguyen | |
| 2013 | The Meteor (Le Météore) | François Delisle | |
| 2014 | Mommy | Xavier Dolan | |
| 2015 | The Demons (Les Démons) | Philippe Lesage | |
| 2016 | Before the Streets (Avant les rues) | Chloé Leriche | |
| 2017 | Ravenous (Les Affamés) | Robin Aubert | |
| 2018 | The Devil's Share (La Part du diable) | Luc Bourdon | |
| 2019 | The Twentieth Century | Matthew Rankin | |

=== 2020s ===
| Year | Film | Director | Ref |
|---|---|---|---|
| 2020 | Nadia, Butterfly | Pascal Plante | |
| 2021 | Archipelago (Archipel) | Félix Dufour-Laperrière | |
| 2022 | Geographies of Solitude | Jacquelyn Mills | |
| 2023 | Red Rooms (Les Chambres rouges) | Pascal Plante | |
| 2024 | Atikamekw Suns (Soleils Atikamekw) | Chloé Leriche | |
| 2025 | Universal Language (Une langue universelle) | Matthew Rankin | |
