= The Moving Statue =

- French: La liberté d'une statue
- Directed by: Olivier Asselin
- Written by: Olivier Asselin
- Produced by: Martin Paul-Hus
- Starring: Lucille Fluet; Ronald Houle
- Cinematography: Olivier Asselin
- Edited by: Olivier Asselin; Claude Palardy
- Production company: Amérique Film
- Release date: September 1990 (TIFF)
- Running time: 90 minutes
- Country: Canada
- Language: French

The Moving Statue (French: La liberté d'une statue) is a Canadian drama film, directed by Olivier Asselin and released in 1990. An experimental black-and-white film inspired by the silent film era, the film is presented as an old Egyptian silent film that has just recently been rediscovered, and is being translated to the viewing audience by means of a deaf lip reader whose sign language is in turn translated by the narrator; the silent film itself depicts the story of a young woman (Lucille Fluet) wandering in the desert, who attracts unwanted attention after she miraculously resurrects a man (Ronald Houle) who had been turned to stone.

The film's cast includes Serge Christiaenssens, Roch Aubert, Pierre-Charles Milette, Guy Provencher, Geneviève Asselin, André Myron, François Roberge, Alexandre Daniel, Linda Paquet, Carole Bouffard, Pierre Brayer and Carl Béchard, as well as Olivier Asselin himself in a small role as Pyrrhon.

The film premiered at the 1990 Festival of Festivals. It was later screened at the 1991 Rendez-vous du cinéma québécois, where it was the winner of the Prix L.-E.-Ouimet-Molson from the Association québécoise des critiques de cinéma.

After not being available for a number of years, a digital remastering of the film was screened in 2019 at the Cinémathèque québécoise.
