= Waiting for the Storms =

- French: Le Temps
- Directed by: François Delisle
- Screenplay by: François Delisle
- Starring: Emmanuelle Lussier-Martinez; Mylène Mackay; Laurent Lucas; Dominick Rustam; Rose-Marie Perreault
- Edited by: François Delisle
- Music by: Robert Marcel Lepage
- Production company: Les Films 53/12
- Distributed by: h264 distribution
- Release date: April 18, 2025
- Running time: 94 minutes
- Country: Canada
- Languages: French; English; Russian

Waiting for the Storms (French: Le Temps) is a feature-length fictional film from Quebec, written and directed by François Delisle and addressing climate change. The film premiered at the Festival international du film sur l'art in Montreal. It was released in theaters in Quebec on April 18, 2025.

== Synopsis ==
The film is a fable about the climate crisis. Across time and diverse landscapes, four characters weave a tapestry of stories exploring human resilience in the face of environmental upheaval.

Marie, grappling with the agonizing and obsessive question of a young mother facing an uncertain future for her child, transforms her anxiety into passionate activism. Terence, a climate refugee, entrusts his fate to foreigners, hoping to find refuge in the north. McKenzie, a state security agent, breaks free from the system to regain control of their destiny and finally feel alive. And Kira, a soldier, flees the army to join a nomadic tribe, guardians of humanist values.

== Cast ==
- Emmanuelle Lussiez-Martinez: Marie
- Mylène Mackay: French voice of Marie
- Dominick Rustam: Terence
- Robert Naylor: voice of Terence
- Laurent Lucas: McKenzie
- Julian Casey: voice of McKenzie
- Rose-Marie Perreault: Kira
- Masha Bashmakova: voice of Kira

== Release ==
The film premiered at the Festival international du film sur l'art in Montreal on March 21, 2025. It was also screened at the Canadian Film Festival in Toronto, the Festival du Film de l'Outaouais in Gatineau, and the Festival du Cinéma du Monde in Sherbrooke. The film premiered in Quebec on April 18, 2025, on Earth Day.
