= Boroughs of Montreal during the COVID-19 pandemic =

Sequence of major events in a virus pandemic by Montreal borough

The boroughs of Montreal, like the rest of Canada and the world, have been individually impacted by the COVID-19 pandemic.

== Ahuntsic-Cartierville ==
On March 25, TVA Nouvelles reported on March 25, 2020, that five people in the Notre-Dame-de-la-Merci CHSLD had tested positive for COVID-19. On April 1 there were 70 cases of COVID-19 in Ahuntsic-Cartierville health establishments, in addition to the 29 cases and seven deaths at the Notre-Dame-de-la-Merci CHSLD. That day, the Laurendeau CHSLD reported 10 cases; Sacré-Coeur Hospital reported 31 cases, and Fleury Hospital reported one case. Four days later, 15 people died in two CHSLDs in Ahuntsic-Cartierville; ninety-nine residents and 94 staff members had been infected.

On April 14, six percent of cases in greater Montreal were in the borough. The Laurendeau CHSLD reported 142 positive cases and 21 deaths the following day, an increase of 81 cases in three days. On April 28, Ahuntsic-Cartierville MP Mélanie Joly said that she would donate part of her annual salary increase to two borough food banks. On May 19, CCM Hockey donated 100,000 surgical masks to the Nord-de-l'Ile-de-Montréal CIUSSS (Integrated University Health and Social Services Centre).

Forty-nine residents of the Notre-Dame-de-la-Merci CHSLD died between mid-May and June 11, bringing the total since the beginning of the pandemic to 90; at the time, it was the largest number of deaths in a CHSLD. On June 12, the management of Concerts Ahuntsic en Fugue announced that the seventh series, scheduled for August, would be postponed to 2021. Restrooms in the borough's public parks began reopening on June 26.

== Anjou ==
On March 13, at the request of the city, local soccer club FC Anjou suspended its season until further notice. Beginning on March 19, municipal council meetings were closed to limit the spread of the virus; of Montreal's 19 boroughs, Anjou was the only one which did not stream its meeting online or take questions from the public.

The borough may have been particularly at risk due to its demographics:

- 9,995 Angevins were over age 65; 5,240 were over 75
- 7,100 lived alone
- 33 percent of families had a single parent
- The average total pretax income of residents age 15 and over was lower than the Montreal average.
- Immigrants and non-permanent residents were 33 and 10 percent of the population, respectively.

The borough set aside an emergency fund of $100,000 to donate to local community organizations, and another $50,000 for Centraide. On April 5, a Costco spokesperson in Anjou announced that three employees had tested positive for COVID-19. By May 5, only 12 shops were open at Les Halles D'Anjou market; over 40 merchants were normally present daily. On May 8, a free frozen-food delivery service became available to Anjou residents who were affected by the pandemic.

== Baie-d'Urfé ==
On March 21, the town of Baie-D'Urfé established a committee to deal with COVID-19. The day before, parks and playgrounds had been closed. At the beginning of April, volunteers began handing out masks at grocery stores. On May 21, eight employees of the Première Moisson plant in Baie-d'Urfé tested positive for COVID-19.

== Côte-des-Neiges–Notre-Dame-de-Grâce ==
Jewish General Hospital, one of four hospitals initially designated by the Quebec government to care for COVID-19 patients, treated two of the 17 Quebecers who had tested positive for COVID-19 by March 13, 2020. On March 14, Sainte-Justine University Hospital Centre announced that a child who had returned from Europe tested positive for COVID-19; it was the first case found in a minor in Quebec. Five days later, an employee tested positive. Two days later, a student at Collège Jean-de-Brébeuf also tested positive.

On March 30, the Montreal Regional Department of Public Health published the number of confirmed cases by borough. Of 1,612 confirmed cases in the region, 161 were in Côte-des-Neiges–Notre-Dame-de-Grâce. On April 7, the Alfred-Desrochers CHSLD was announced as severely affected by the virus; nine residents had died, and 39 had tested positive. That day, longtime resident Marguerite Lescop died of COVID-19 at age 104. That day, Montreal's Notre Dame des Neiges Cemetery – Canada's largest – stopped performing burials and cremations.

On April 23, a truck broadcasting public service announcements in French, English, Vietnamese, Tagalog, Yiddish, Spanish, Creole, Arabic, Russian, Mandarin, Tamil, Hindi, Wolof, Farsi, and Urdu began driving around the borough. By April 27, 1,097 of the 12,034 Montrealers who had tested positive for COVID-19 (nine percent) were from the borough. On May 12, a group of residents asked the city to provide more resources such as mobile screening clinics and masks.

== Côte Saint-Luc ==
On March 20, 2020, public-health authorities announced that individuals diagnosed with COVID-19 had been in public places in Montreal during the preceding week; locations included the Montreal Metro between the Angrignon and McGill station; the 106 bus between Newman Boulevard and the Angrignon station; the Notre-Dame-de-Grâce library; a westbound 24 bus on Sherbrooke Street between Notre-Dame Hospital and the Fine Arts Museum, and the Aunja Restaurant. According to Côte Saint-Luc mayor Mitchell Brownstein, the individuals were among city residents who tested positive for COVID-19. Brownstein said that this made Côte Saint-Luc the worst-affected municipality per capita in Quebec. That day, the head of the emergency department at Maisonneuve-Rosemont Hospital was diagnosed with COVID-19.

A drive-through testing site opened in Côte Saint-Luc on March 29. There were more than 50 cases in the area at the time and, by the end of the month, Côte Saint-Luc had the province's highest COVID-19 rate with 107 cases.

On April 2, the IGA supermarket in Quartier Cavendish announced its closure due to the pandemic; two days later, an employee tested positive for the virus. The drive-through testing site closed on April 16, as a new site was opened at Jewish General Hospital. Masks became mandatory in public areas of Côte Saint-Luc on July 1, making it the first jurisdiction in Canada with a mask mandate.

== Dollard-des-Ormeaux ==
Celebration of the 60th anniversary of the city of Dollard-des-Ormeaux was suspended due to the pandemic. From April 22 to May 8, 2020, 40 residents of the Vigi Dollard-des-Ormeaux CHSLD died due to COVID-19 and a staff shortage. According to a doctor, 70 percent of the nursing home's 160 residents tested positive for the virus.

== Dorval ==
Quebec confirmed its first case on February 28: a 41-year-old woman who landed at Montréal–Trudeau International Airport (in Dorval) on a flight from Doha, Qatar on February 24. She was transferred to Jewish General Hospital on March 3, and was released on March 4. A few days later, Le Journal de Montréal reported that a person with COVID-19 had used the airport's shuttle service.

Dorval announced the closure of some municipal buildings until further notice on March 13. On March 29, Dorval's CHSLD Herron was taken over by the government. It was reported on April 11 that at least five residents of the nursing home had died from COVID-19 in the previous month, part of a larger pattern of neglect discovered at the facility.

Billionaire Michael Rosenberg was sent to intensive care, where he was intubated and sedated. He had participated in a wedding on March 16 at the Crowne Plaza hotel in Montreal. Dorval canceled its major events until at least July 1 on May 25, including celebrations of Saint-Jean-Baptiste Day and Canada Day.

== Hampstead ==
At the beginning of the pandemic, Hampstead mayor William Steinberg downplayed COVID-19. Despite this, the April 6 municipal council meeting was held online. At that time, the median rate for Montreal was 36 cases for every 100,000 people. The infection rate reached 150–200 per 100,000 in neighbourhoods such as Hampstead, leading to additional health measures. Although tennis courts and dog parks were reopened in late May, summer day camps remained cancelled.

== Kirkland ==
On March 30, Kirkland closed its parks and park buildings. The city set up a telephone line for seniors to receive real-time updates and news about city resources. The Ecclestone swimming pool was closed for the 2020 season.

== Lachine ==
On March 24, the borough of Lachine said that it would contribute $35,000 to Centraide's emergency fund. At the beginning of April, a testing centre opened at the Cité Medical de Lachine clinic.

A Lachine repairman was criticized on April 6 after citizens learned that his wife had COVID-19. On April 21, a case of COVID-19 was diagnosed at the Sisters of Sainte-Anne motherhouse; a month later, it was Quebec's most- affected private senior residence.

From May 3 to 5, the number of COVID-19 cases in Lachine doubled. On May 15, the borough cancelled garage sales until further notice. A viral outbreak after a July 18 lifeguard-initiation party forced city officials to temporarily close public pools.

== LaSalle ==
A person with COVID-19 rode a bus from Boulevard Newman towards Angrignon station on March 10. On March 27, Parc des Rapides in LaSalle closed because of the pandemic.

LaSalle had the second-highest number of cases (237) of Montreal's boroughs on April 7, just behind Côte-des-Neiges (400 cases). Of LaSalle's 237 cases, 23 had died; fourteen had stayed at the LaSalle Accommodation Centre and nine at LaSalle Hospital. At least 29 patients had contracted the virus in the CHSLD (the accommodation centre), and 20 others in the hospital. On April 24, the Red Cross set up dozens of beds in the Jacques Lemaire Arena.

A mobile screening clinic was set up in LaSalle on May 13. On June 4, soldiers deployed to CHSLD Floralies began to leave the nursing home.

== L'Île-Bizard–Sainte-Geneviève ==
In mid-March, despite the pandemic, the city of Montreal began monitoring the spring freshets of the Rivière des Prairies (which runs alongside L'Île-Bizard–Sainte-Geneviève). At the end of March, Montreal had 1,612 COVID-19 cases; five were from the borough.

== Mercier–Hochelaga-Maisonneuve ==
The city of Montreal announced the closure of all community centres, cultural facilities, libraries, swimming pools, arenas and sports facilities in Mercier–Hochelaga-Maisonneuve (MHM) on March 13. Four days later, it announced the temporary closure of all Access Montreal offices and permit counters. On March 24, Mayor Pierre Lessard-Blais announced that the borough would contribute $100,000 to Centraide's emergency fund.

On April 13, the Francis-Bouillon arena was converted to a homeless shelter; the Maurice Richard Arena was converted to a similar facility a few days later. Around that time, several pedestrian corridors were put in place in the borough to improve COVID-19 security. In late April, a mobile screening clinic was deployed in the borough.

Twenty-seven Canadian Armed Forces soldiers were deployed to the CHSLD Benjamin-Victor-Rousselot on May 1. Between May 2 and May 12, the number of deaths in the borough nearly doubled. On May 13, 15,000 masks began to be distributed to MHM residents over a nine-day period. The Débrouillards scientific day camps were canceled on May 20.

== Montreal-Est ==
On March 19, Montréal-Est announced the closure of all non-essential services the following day. A month later, residential construction (on April 20) and landscaping (on April 15) partially resumed. On June 2, the city announced the temporary closure of its facilities after three employees were diagnosed with COVID-19 the previous week.

== Montréal-Nord ==
On March 13, Montréal-Nord mayor Christine Black placed herself in voluntary quarantine after returning from her spring-break trip. Three weeks after the COVID-19 crisis began, the Obsession Club (a Montréal-Nord nightclub which prided itself on being the world's largest swinger club) filed for bankruptcy protection due to COVID-19. On April 5, Toronto Raptors player Chris Boucher urged young people in Montréal-Nord to follow public-health guidelines.

Between March 25 and April 7, four employees tested positive for coronavirus in Metro Inc.'s meat and frozen distribution centre. Since then, two other cases have been identified at this distribution centre. There were 50 confirmed cases in the borough on March 30.

The first positive case in a CHSLD was reported in the borough, which had 149 cases, on April 7. Two days later, the borough had 193 cases. There were 443 infected people, an increase of 52 percent in four days, on April 16. Forty people in Montréal-Nord had died from COVID-19 and 839 cases had been identified by April 22.

Montréal-Nord had 1,153 confirmed cases by April 29, or 1,369 per 100,000 inhabitants. The rate in Quebec was 325 per 100,000 inhabitants, and 143 in Canada. According to Le Devoir, 23 percent of the borough's cases were health workers and 19 percent were residents of CHSLDs.

Status of facilities for the elderly and vulnerable, April 30, 2020
Date	Facility	Number of COVID-positive residents	Percentage
April 29	Résidence Angelica	162	Less than 15%
April 29	Hôpital Marie-Clarac	66	15–25%
April 28	Résidence Angelica	145	More than 25%
April 26	CHSLD Champlain-De-Gouin	30	More than 25%
April 28	Château Beaurivage	29	15–25%
April 28	Résidence Les Cascades	2	15–25%
By April 13	Résidence Sault-au-Récollet	1	15–25%
By April 13	Résidence Portofino	1	15–25%

A screening centre was opened for the borough's symptomatic population on May 1, 2020. On May 23, Kent Nagano and the Montreal Symphony Orchestra sent a message of support to Montréal-Nord in an online video. From May 19 to 25, the number of new infections fell by 26 percent from the previous week. On June 17, businessman Stéphane Pierre Corneille donated $250,000 worth of personal protective equipment to organizations in Montréal-Nord.

== Mount Royal ==
By May 14, the CHSLD Vigi Mont-Royal received help from the Canadian Army after 148 employees and 226 residents contracted the virus due to a ventilation problem. On June 21, a drive-in cinema opened on the site of the Royalmount real-estate project.

== Outremont ==
The New York Times reported on March 18 that the virus was present in Hasidim in Williamsburg and Borough Park, Brooklyn, communities linked to those in Outremont, Côte-des-Neiges and Boisbriand. On March 28, 38 percent of the 971 Montrealers who tested positive for COVID-19 lived in Côte-des-Neiges-Notre-Dame-de-Grâce, Outremont, Parc-Extension and the cities of Hampstead and Côte-Saint-Luc. Outremont had the highest infection rate per 100,000 inhabitants until April 16.

On March 25, COVID-19 claimed its first victim in Montreal: a 67-year-old man who lived in Outremont. The following day, the SPVM found eight pallets with hundreds of cases of Ontario wine behind the Satmar synagogue on Hutchison Street in Outremont. A few days later, the SPVM limited Hasidic gatherings in Montreal. On May 13, the SPVM again intervened in Montreal's Orthodox Jewish community.

== Pierrefonds-Roxboro ==
In addition to dealing with the pandemic, the Pierrefonds-Roxboro borough closely monitored the level of the Rivière des Prairies. An emergency fund of $35,000 was created by the borough on April 6, 2020. On May 8, it canceled the annual ecological-gardening day scheduled for May 29.

The borough's Cloverdale neighbourhood was considered a COVID-19 hotspot by public-health authorities on May 22. On June 2, the borough expected an estimated $500,000 loss of local revenue for 2020 and a budget-reduction target of 3.1 percent (equivalent to $1 million).

== Le Plateau-Mont-Royal ==
On March 24, Le Plateau-Mont-Royal and the Caisse Desjardins du Plateau-Mont-Royal created a local COVID-19 emergency fund of CA$200,000 to support neighbourhood community organizations. Deputy Ruba Ghazal donated $50,000 to the fund. Montreal allocated $1.2 million for an emergency fund to provide food aid to the most-vulnerable citizens.

== Rivière-des-Prairies–Pointe-aux-Trembles ==
Beginning on May 7, 10,000 masks were distributed in the borough. On May 15, a testing centre was set up at the CLSC de l'Est de Montréal in Pointe-aux-Trembles. The borough was then considered a hot zone in Quebec. On May 22, Rivière-des-Prairies–Pointe-aux-Trembles deployed a new series of measures to counter the spread of the coronavirus.

== Rosemont–La Petite-Patrie ==
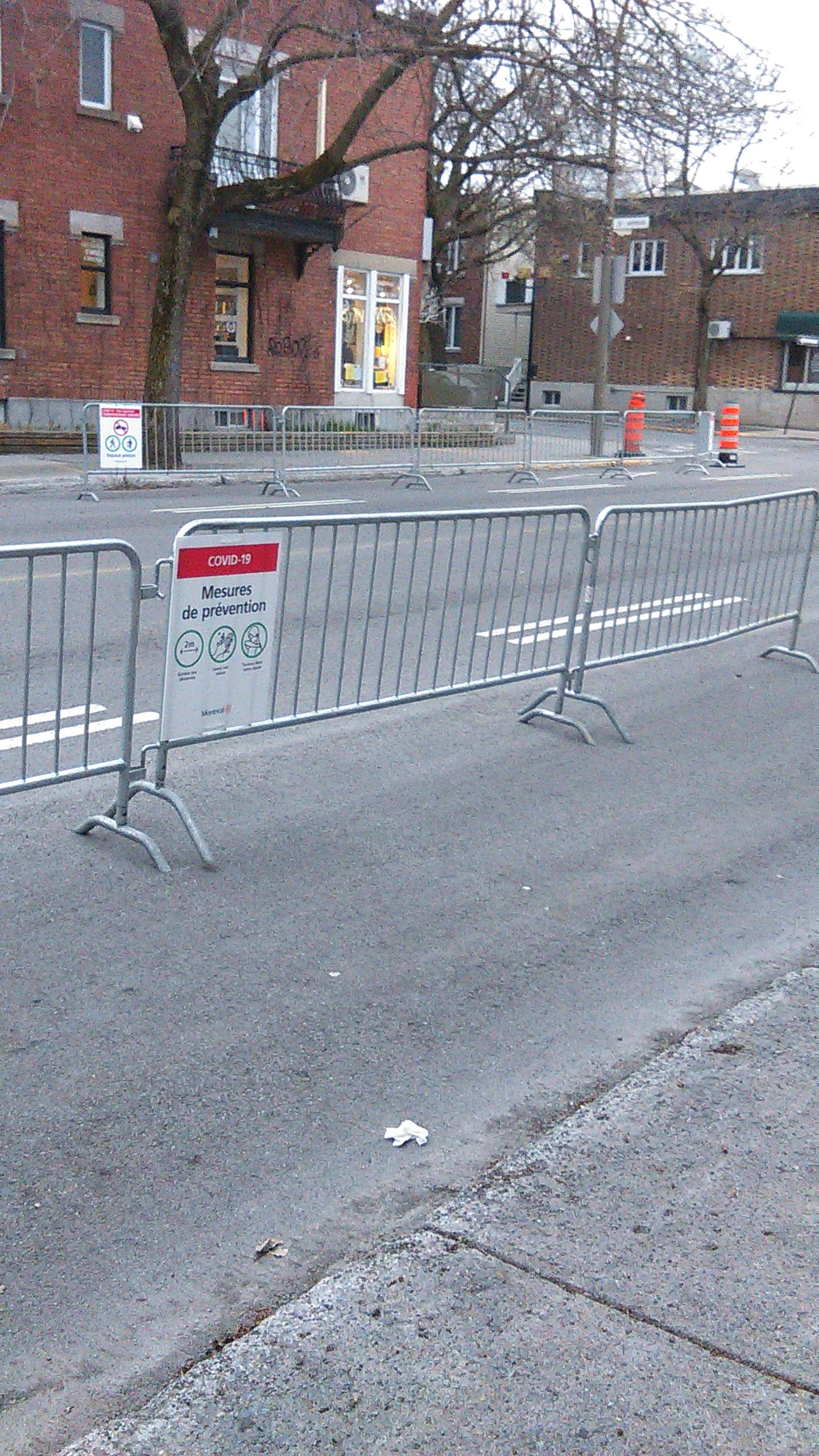
Social-distancing corridors on Beaubien Street in Rosemont–La Petite-Patrie

Beginning on March 13, 2020, patients at Hôpital Maisonneuve-Rosemont and the Santa-Cabrini hospital could not have visitors. A week later, a member of the Maisonneuve-Rosemont Hospital care team had COVID-19: the fourth case in a hospital setting. On March 20, the EPIC Centre (one of Canada's largest cardiovascular-disease prevention centres, with 5,303 registered members) suspended its activities until further notice. The following day, Lenni-Kim posted on his Instagram account that he and his mother had tested positive at Hôpital Maisonneuve-Rosemont. On March 26, the Angus Medical Clinic opened a COVID-19 clinic offering consultations to people diagnosed with the virua and requiring medical care.

On April 2, with 133 cases, Rosemont was Montreal's third-most-affected borough. Four days later, the borough councilor wanted to donate $100,000 to Centraide of Greater Montreal. Eighty-seven cases and seven deaths related to COVID-19 were reported in seven nursing homes by April 7, including the CHSLD J. Henri Charbonneau. On April 28, four of Maisonneuve-Rosemont Hospital's five surgical units contained COVID-19 patients.

In mid-April, several pedestrian corridors were installed in the borough to make walking safer. On April 30, traffic was banned on Marché-Du-Nord streets when the Jean-Talon Market was open to improve the farmers' market's health standards.

Road work in the borough began to resume on May 11, and an online petition circulated to reopen the Botanical Garden. The La Mennais emergency childcare service was closed for two weeks due to a COVID-19 outbreak.

By May 12, 227 of the borough's health workers had been diagnosed with COVID-19 (21 percent of the region's total cases). A week later, borough mayor François Croteau announced that the section of Saint-Laurent Boulevard, between rue Saint-Zotique and rue Jean-Talon would be converted into a transit mall. Little Italy restaurateurs were authorized to extend their terraces into the street to facilitate social distancing. On June 5, organizers of Montreal's August Italian Week festival announced that the event would be virtual. Three days later, the borough mayor announced the cancellation of "pedestrianization with bus" projects on the Beaubien and Masson commercial arteries and the removal of social-distancing corridors.

June 9 status
Facility	Status
Soccer and baseball fields	Open for practice with 2-metre (6 ft 7 in) social distancing; no games
Basketball courts	Open for practice with 2-metre (6 ft 7 in) social distancing; no games. Nets to be installed soon.
Playgrounds	Open, with cleaning in accordance with Regional Public Health Department recommendations
Water sports	Water parks open from 9 am to 9 pm, except those in the Parc de la Cité-Jardin (scheduled to open soon).
Libraries	Closed. Before the gradual reopening of the borough's libraries, a blog where local residents could document their experiences was posted.
Permit counter	Open by appointment
Community gardens	Open
Skate parks	Open
Tennis courts	Open for singles practice, outdoors only
Dog parks	Open
Municipal golf	Open
Swimming pools and arena	Closed
Maisonneuve Park parking lot and chalet	Closed

On June 16, the Beaubien Cinema announced that it would reopen on July 3.

== Saint-Léonard ==
On April 9, 2020, Saint-Léonard announced the creation of a COVID-19 emergency fund up to $50,000.

Reopenings
Facility	Reopening
Building permits office	May 4
Community gardens	May 18
Tennis courts at Pie-XII, Ferland, Giuseppe-Garibaldi parks, Ladauversière and Wilfrid-Bastien	May 22
Arthur-Péloquin and Jean-Talon dog parks, Provencher	May 22
Shops	May 25
Water games, Wilfrid-Bastien, Couvertin, and Luigi-Pirandello parks	May 26
Water games, Ferland and Delorme parks	May 27
Delorme park skate park	May 27

On June 1, the Intermarché Lagoria grocery chain imposed a mask mandate. The DOD basketball organization set up a survival kit to assist parents with their children's education.

== Senneville ==
All of Montreal's boroughs had confirmed cases by April 4, with Senneville experiencing its first cases.

== Sud-Ouest ==
On April 20, 115 of the 165 residents of CHSLD Yvon-Brunet were infected with COVID-19. More than four out of five deaths were in senior residences in Le Sud-Ouest on June 3. On May 13–15, a mobile screening clinic visited the borough.

== Verdun ==
On February 28, 2020, the Quebec government confirmed its first case of COVID-19: a 41-year-old Montrealer who had returned from Iran. After going to a Verdun clinic, the woman was transferred to Verdun Hospital. On March 27, Verdun Hospital's emergency department closed due to an outbreak of the virus; by April 2, at least 35 patients and two doctors had contracted COVID-19 at the hospital. The following day, 2,837 cases were confirmed in the metropolitan area; 204 healthcare workers – including 148 in Montreal – were diagnosed with COVID-19 (including five doctors from Verdun Hospital).

On April 7, actor and comedian Ghyslain Tremblay died at age 68 in L'Étincelle nursing home in Verdun after he became infected with COVID-19. A week later, Verdun Hospital began constructing a temporary 36-bed annex; it was scheduled for completion by the end of April. On April 17, the hospital experienced a second COVID-19 outbreak. The borough began a pilot project partially closing Wellington Street to car traffic on May 8.

Reopenings as of June 12
Facility	Reopening
Libraries	June 22
Community gardens	May 21
Tennis courts (Arthur-Terrien, de La Fontaine, Elgar, Reine-Élisabeth and Wilson parks)	June 1
Water games	June 1

== Ville-Marie ==
Ville-Marie's community centres, cultural sites, libraries, swimming pools, arena and sports facilities were closed on March 13, 2020, until further notice. On March 24, the borough donated $150,000 to the COVID-19 emergency fund to support its 80 community organizations. The day before, Ville-Marie's first walk-in COVID-19 screening clinic was set up in large tents on the Place des festivals. At the end of March, Ville-Marie was one of six boroughs with more than 50 cases of COVID-19. About 50 people per day warmed up in the Grande Bibliothèque between April 12 and June 4, 2020; the library's hall had been converted into a homeless shelter during the pandemic

On April 15, Québec solidaire member for Sainte-Marie–Saint-Jacques and head of the second opposition group in the Quebec National Assembly Manon Massé donated $50,000 to the emergency fund on April 15, in common with the Caisses Desjardins of Complexe Desjardins and Quartier-Latin de Montréal.

A second McDonald's employee tested positive. The first employee worked at the restaurant at 12090 rue Sherbrooke Est, and the second worked at 2901 rue Sherbrooke Est. The Native Women's Shelter of Montreal was closed on May 19 after a staff outbreak of COVID-19.

On June 3, the Chambre du commerce du Montréal métropolitain (CCMM) proposed making Sainte-Catherine street pedestrian-only between Atwater and Papineau. Due to the pandemic, downtown Montreal has lost 100,000 students, millions of tourists and about 80 percent of its workers (most of whom are telecommuting).

== Villeray–Saint-Michel–Parc-Extension ==
On May 1, 2020, Saint-Michel's accessible screening clinic was open on Sunday to Wednesday from noon to 8 p.m. Authorities estimated a daily capacity of 100 tests. On May 18, a walk-in mobile screening clinic was testing asymptomatic residents.

On May 6, with 1,239 cases, Villeray–Saint-Michel–Parc-Extension, was Montreal's second-most-affected borough. Community organizations feared an upsurge of cases in one of Canada's poorest neighbourhoods. On May 15, the borough announced its summer 2020 travel plan.

Reopenings as of June 12
Facility	Reopening
Libraries	June 15 (book returns); June 22 (Le Prévost and Saint-Michel branches)
Outdoor pools	June 20
Sports fields	May 23
Claude-Léveillée Culture House	Open as a cooling facility
Water sports	May 26
Dog parks	May 23
Community gardens	May 19

== Westmount ==
On March 12, 2020, a woman with COVID-19 attended a wedding in a Westmount synagogue with over 100 others. A week later, public access to Westmount's playgrounds was banned until further notice. Several days later, a firefighter tested positive for COVID-19.

On April 6, the municipal council voted to postpone the date of the second payment of municipal taxes. The following day, access to the borough was restricted to local traffic and deliveries. On April 8, Westmount pedestrians were asked to socially distance. A week later, landscaping services quietly resumed. On April 21, 21 cases of COVID-19 were diagnosed at St. Margaret's Residence on Hillside Avenue (Westmount's only public CHSLD). The city opened its community gardens on May 18.
