= Olivier Asselin =

Canadian film director and screenwriter from Quebec

Olivier Asselin is a Canadian film director and screenwriter from Quebec. He is most noted for his films The Moving Statue (La Liberté d'une statue), which was the winner of the Prix L.-E.-Ouimet-Molson from the Association québécoise des critiques de cinéma in 1991, and The Cyclotron (Le Cyclotron), for which he won the Borsos Competition Award for Best Screenplay at the 2016 Whistler Film Festival.

He is a professor of art and film history at the Université de Montréal. His filmmaking style is marked by the exploration of philosophical and scientific themes, presented in a highly stylized manner that pays tribute to the aesthetic of older periods in film history, and has been compared to the styles of Guy Maddin and early Lars von Trier.

== Personal life ==
He is married to Lucille Fluet, who has appeared as an actress in all of his films and was a co-writer of several of them.

== Filmography ==
- The Moving Statue (La Liberté d'une statue) - 1990
- The Seat of the Soul (Le siège de l'âme) - 1997
- A Sentimental Capitalism (Un capitalisme sentimental) - 2008
- The Cyclotron (Le Cyclotron) - 2016
