= Red Rooms =

2023 film by Pascal Plante

- Theatrical release poster
- French: Les chambres rouges
- Directed by: Pascal Plante
- Written by: Pascal Plante
- Produced by: Dominique Dussault
- Starring: Juliette Gariépy; Laurie Babin; Elisabeth Locas; Maxwell McCabe-Lokos; Natalie Tannous; Pierre Chagnon; Guy Thauvette
- Cinematography: Vincent Biron
- Edited by: Jonah Malak
- Music by: Dominique Plante
- Production company: Nemesis Films
- Distributed by: Entract Films
- Release dates: July 4, 2023 (KVIFF); August 11, 2023 (Canada)
- Running time: 118 minutes
- Country: Canada
- Languages: French; English
- Box office: $145,362

Red Rooms (French: Les chambres rouges) is a 2023 Canadian crime drama film written and directed by Pascal Plante. The film stars Juliette Gariépy, Laurie Babin, Elisabeth Locas, Maxwell McCabe-Lokos, Natalie Tannous, Pierre Chagnon, and Guy Thauvette. The film's production was first announced in November 2022.

Red Rooms premiered at the 57th Karlovy Vary International Film Festival on July 4, 2023, and had its North American premiere as the opening film of the 2023 Fantasia Film Festival. It was released theatrically in Canada on August 11, 2023, to positive reviews from critics.

== Plot ==
In Montreal, fashion model Kelly-Anne attends the trial of Ludovic Chevalier, accused of broadcasting his murder of three teenage girls in a "Red Room", a chat room on the dark web where people pay to watch snuff films. The case has become a media circus and attracted the attention of both the press and "fans" of Chevalier, some of whom believe he is being framed due to his reticent demeanor. Despite the FBI's submission of two snuff films to the Canadian authorities, doubt is cast over the killer's identity due to their use of a balaclava while filming them.

Kelly-Anne bonds with a neurotic "fan" of Chevalier's, Clementine, a younger woman who has hitchhiked to Montreal to attend the trial. Having grown close due to their mutual fascination with the case, Kelly-Anne invites Clementine to live with her for the duration of the trial. While Clementine passionately defends Chevalier in conversation, Kelly-Anne remains distant and taciturn.

Kelly-Anne reveals that the majority of her income comes from online gambling. She further reveals a proficiency in computer technology, having programmed her own AI which she has named Guinevere. Unbeknownst to Clementine, Kelly-Anne has begun cyber-stalking Francine Beaulieu, the mother of Camille, Chevalier's youngest victim and the only girl whose snuff video has never been found.

On the day that two of Chevalier's snuff films are to be played in court, the public gallery is forced to leave. An upset Clementine expresses disappointment that she will not be able to see the films, believing they will prove Chevalier's innocence. Kelly-Anne reveals she has already obtained and watched the films via the dark web, and that they contain proof Chevalier is the killer. Kelly-Anne and Clementine return to the former's apartment, where they watch the videos together. Kelly-Anne points out the masked killer has Chevalier's distinct blue eyes and unusual gait. Clementine begins weeping at the brutality of the videos; visibly disturbed, she decides to skip the rest of the trial and buys a bus ticket home. As she leaves, Clementine asks Kelly-Anne why she is so fascinated with the case, which she is unable to answer.

On Chevalier's birthday, Kelly-Anne attends court wearing a wig, colored contact lenses, and the uniform Camille was murdered in to resemble the girl. Kelly-Anne is forcibly ejected from the courtroom; as she leaves, the normally rigid Chevalier waves and makes eye contact with her. That night, Kelly-Anne's modeling agency fires her for the stunt.

Kelly-Anne makes contact with a dark web hacker, who has obtained Camille's snuff video and is planning to auction it. After proving her identity and ability to bid, Kelly-Anne is welcomed into the auction. Though the bidding initially rises above what she can pay, Kelly-Anne wins a last-minute hand of poker and uses the proceeds to win the snuff film. Suspicious that her activities have been monitored via Guinevere, Kelly-Anne destroys the AI in her blender and watches the film. That night, Kelly-Anne breaks into Beaulieu's home. After posing for selfies in Camille's room while wearing her schoolgirl uniform, Kelly-Anne leaves a flash drive containing the snuff film in Francine's bedroom.

Some time later, a news broadcast reveals that Francine turned the flash drive over to the police. Camille's snuff film contains irrefutable proof that Chevalier is the murderer; he subsequently changes his plea to guilty. Back home, Clementine gives an interview to a journalist in which she describes herself as an "ex-groupie" and expresses regret for having supported Chevalier, saying she can now only think about his victims.

== Cast ==
- Juliette Gariépy as Kelly-Anne
- Laurie Babin as Clémentine
- Elisabeth Locas as Francine Beaulieu
- Natalie Tannous as Maître Yasmine Chedid
- Pierre Chagnon as Maître Richard Fortin
- Guy Thauvette as Judge Marcel Godbout
- Maxwell McCabe-Lokos as Ludovic Chevalier

== Production ==
Principal photography took place in Montreal in 2022 over 23 days.

== Reception ==
=== Critical response ===
On the review aggregator website Rotten Tomatoes, 96% of 78 critics' reviews are positive, with an average rating of 8.1/10. The website's consensus reads: "Anchored by Juliette Gariépy's superb portrayal of self-destructive obsession, Red Rooms is a haunting and timely trip down a particularly morbid rabbit hole." Metacritic, which uses a weighted average, assigned the film a score of 81 out of 100, based on 15 critics, indicating "universal acclaim".

=== Accolades ===
Award	Date	Category	Recipient(s)	Result	Ref.
Karlovy Vary Film festival	2023	Crystal Globe Competition	Red Rooms	Nominated	
Fantasia Film Festival	2023	Best Film	Pascal Plante	Won	
Fantasia Film Festival	2023	Best Screenplay	Pascal Plante	Won	
Fantasia Film Festival	2023	Best Performance	Juliette Gariépy	Won	
Fantasia Film Festival	2023	Best Score	Dominique Plante	Won	
Prix Iris	December 10, 2023	Best Film	Dominique Dussault	Nominated	
Prix Iris	December 10, 2023	Best Director	Pascal Plante	Nominated	
Prix Iris	December 10, 2023	Best Supporting Actress	Laurie Babin	Won	
Prix Iris	December 10, 2023	Revelation of the Year	Juliette Gariépy	Won	
Prix Iris	December 10, 2023	Best Screenplay	Pascal Plante	Nominated	
Prix Iris	December 10, 2023	Best Art Direction	Laura Nhem	Nominated	
Prix Iris	December 10, 2023	Best Cinematography	Vincent Biron	Nominated	
Prix Iris	December 10, 2023	Best Editing	Jonah Malak	Nominated	
Prix Iris	December 10, 2023	Best Original Music	Dominique Plante	Nominated	
Prix Iris	December 10, 2023	Best Sound	Olivier Calvert, Stéphane Bergeron, Martyne Morin	Nominated	
Prix Iris	December 10, 2023	Best Hairstyling	Nermin Grbic	Nominated	
Prix Iris	December 10, 2023	Best Makeup	Marie Salvado	Nominated	
Prix Iris	December 10, 2023	Best Casting	Marilou Richer	Nominated	
Prix collégial du cinéma québécois	2024	Best Film	Pascal Plante	Won	
Rendez-vous du cinéma québécois	2024	Prix Luc-Perreault	Pascal Plante	Won	
Chicago Film Critics Association	December 11, 2024	Best Foreign Language Film	Red Rooms	Nominated	
