= Les Halles (disambiguation) =

Les Halles is a market area of Paris, France.

Les Halles may also refer to:

- Châtelet–Les Halles station, a major train hub in Paris
- Les Halles station, a station on Paris Metro Line 4
- Les Halles, Rhône, a commune in France
- Brasserie Les Halles, a defunct restaurant with locations in New York and other cities

== See also ==
- Les Halles D'Anjou, a shopping mall in Montreal, Quebec, Canada
