= Noël Mitrani =

French and Canadian film director (born 1969)

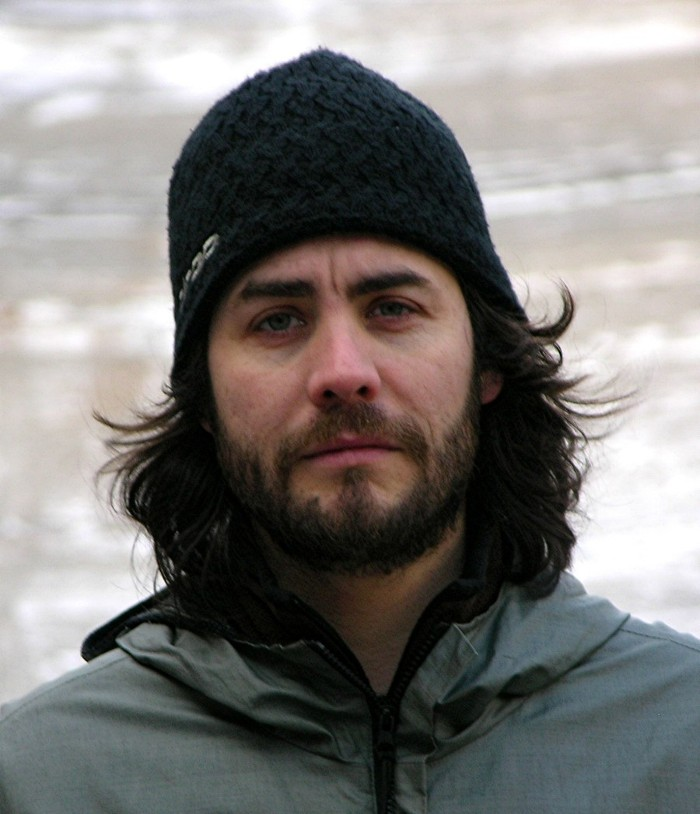
- Mitrani in 2006
- Born: November 11, 1969 (age 57); Toronto, Ontario, Canada
- Citizenship: France; Canada
- Education: Sorbonne University
- Occupations: Film director; Producer; Writer
- Years active: 1999–present

Noël Mitrani (born 11 November 1969) is a French-Canadian film director, producer and screenwriter.

== Early life and education ==
Noël Mitrani was born on November 11, 1969, in Toronto, Ontario, to French parents. He relocated to France at the age of 5, and his childhood was spent between Ontario and France.

Mitrani graduated with a degree in history and philosophy from the Sorbonne, and spent time after graduation as a press illustrator. His first work in cinema was as a writer.

== Career ==
=== 1999–2005: Early work in France ===
In 1999, Mitrani directed a short film titled After Shave, a comedy set in a suburban supermarket, for broadcast on Canal+.

In 2003, Mitrani directed Les Siens, a short film broadcast on France 3.

=== 2006-2010: Feature-length film ===
In 2005, Mitrani directed and produced On the Trail of Igor Rizzi (Sur la trace d'Igor Rizzi), a black comedy starring Laurent Lucas and Isabelle Blais. The film won the Toronto International Film Festival Award for Best Canadian First Feature Film at the 2006 Toronto International Film Festival.

In 2010 Mitrani directed The Kate Logan Affair (2010), a thriller starring Alexis Bledel.

=== 2013–present: Independent film ===
Between 2014 and 2026 Mitrani directed a series of independent films, including The Military Man (Le Militaire), Afterwards (Après coup), Cassy, Between Them (Toutes les deux), Emma Under Influence (Emma sous influence), Bitter Bond (Révolté) and Homicide involontaire.

During the COVID-19 pandemic, he participated in the Greetings from Isolation project.

== Filmography ==
As director:

Year	Title	Distributor
2006	On the Trail of Igor Rizzi (Sur la trace d'Igor Rizzi)	Atopia
2010	The Kate Logan Affair	E1 Entertainment
2014	The Military Man (Le Militaire)	Gapian Films
2017	Afterwards (Après coup)	Gapian Films
2019	Cassy	Verorev Films
2021	Between Them (Toutes les deux)	Verorev Films
2024	Emma Under Influence (Emma sous influence)	Universal Pictures
2026	Bitter Bond (Révolté)	Marcova Productions
2027	Homicide involontaire	Marcova Productions
