= The Meteor (film) =

2013 Canadian drama film

- Film poster
- French: Le Météore
- Directed by: François Delisle
- Written by: François Delisle
- Produced by: François Delisle
- Starring: François Delisle; Noémie Godin-Vigneau
- Cinematography: François Delisle
- Edited by: François Delisle
- Music by: François Delisle; Suzie Leblanc
- Production company: Films 53/12
- Distributed by: Funfilm
- Release date: January 19, 2013 (Sundance)
- Running time: 85 minutes
- Country: Canada
- Language: French

The Meteor (French: Le Météore) is a Canadian dramatic docufiction film, directed by François Delisle and released in 2013. The film centres on the experiences of Pierre, a man who is serving a 14-year prison sentence for manslaughter after accidentally killing a woman while driving under the influence, and his interactions with his mother, his ex-girlfriend Suzanne, a prison guard and a cellmate.

To heighten the sense of Pierre's dislocation and isolation, none of the main characters in the film are voiced by the same actors who appear on screen. Pierre is physically performed by Delisle himself, and voiced by François Papineau; Delisle's real-life mother, Jacqueline Courtemanche, appears as Pierre's mother while the character is voiced by Andrée Lachapelle; Suzanne is portrayed by Noémie Godin-Vigneau and voiced by Dominique Leduc; the prison guard is portrayed by Laurent Lucas and voiced by Stephane Jacques; Pierre's cellmate Max is played by Dany Boudreault, and voiced by Pierre-Luc Lafontaine.

== Production ==
The film had its origins in a creative collaboration between Delisle and photographer Anouk Lessard, in which Lessard took five photographs around which Delisle would write text. Each of the five texts he wrote appears in the film as a monologue.

== Distribution ==
The film premiered at the 2013 Sundance Film Festival, and was later screened in the Forum section at the 2013 Berlin Film Festival. It had its Canadian commercial premiere on March 8, 2013.

== Awards ==
Delisle received a Canadian Screen Award nomination for Best Cinematography at the 2nd Canadian Screen Awards in 2014, and the film won the Prix Luc-Perreault from the Association québécoise des critiques de cinéma.

The film was shortlisted for the Prix collégial du cinéma québécois in 2014.
