= Afterwards =

Afterwards may refer to:

- Afterwards (1928 film), a British silent drama film
- Afterwards (2008 film), a psychological thriller film
- Afterwards (2017 film), a Canadian drama film
- Afterwards (2023 film), a Canadian short documentary
- Afterwards (play), a 1933 mystery play by Walter C. Hackett
- Afterwards, a novel by Rosamund Lupton

== See also ==
- Afterword, a literary device at the end of a piece of literature
