= Rural Route 5 =

- French: Rang 5
- Directed by: Richard Lavoie
- Written by: Richard Lavoie
- Produced by: Richard Lavoie
- Cinematography: Richard Lavoie
- Edited by: Isabelle De Blois
- Production company: National Film Board of Canada
- Release date: September 20, 1994
- Running time: 118 minutes
- Country: Canada
- Language: French

Rural Route 5 (French: Rang 5) is a Canadian documentary film, directed by Richard Lavoie and released in 1994. The film centres on the changing nature of agriculture in the late 20th century, through a profile of farmers in the Lanaudière region of Quebec who are coping with changes in the industry.

The film won the Prix L.-E.-Ouimet-Molson from the Association québécoise des critiques de cinéma in 1996.
