= Carcajou et le péril blanc =

Carcajou et le péril blanc (Innu: Kauapishit Miam Kuakuatshen Etentakuess) is a Canadian series of documentary films, directed by Arthur Lamothe and released between 1973 and 1976. Profiling the Innu people of northern Quebec, the films were among the first in the history of cinema to depict indigenous peoples speaking their own languages.

The films have also been packaged with Lamothe's later La Terre de l'homme series as a larger Chronique des Indiens du Nord-Est du Québec.

The second film in the series, Ntesi Nana Shepen (On disait que c'était notre terre), won the Association québécoise des critiques de cinéma's Prix L.-E.-Ouimet-Molson for 1975.

== Films ==
- Mistashipu (La Grande rivière)
- Ntesi Nana Shepen (On disait que c'était notre terre)
- Ntesi Nana Shepen 2 (On disait que c'était notre terre, partie 2)
- Ntesi Nana Shepen 3 (On disait que c'était notre terre, partie 3)
- Ntesi Nana Shepen 4 (On disait que c'était notre terre, partie 4)
- Kuestetsheskamit (L'Autre monde)
- Patshiantshiuapa Mak Mistikussiupapa (Le Passage des tentes aux maisons)
- Pakuashipu (La Rivière sèche)
