= Cassy (film) =

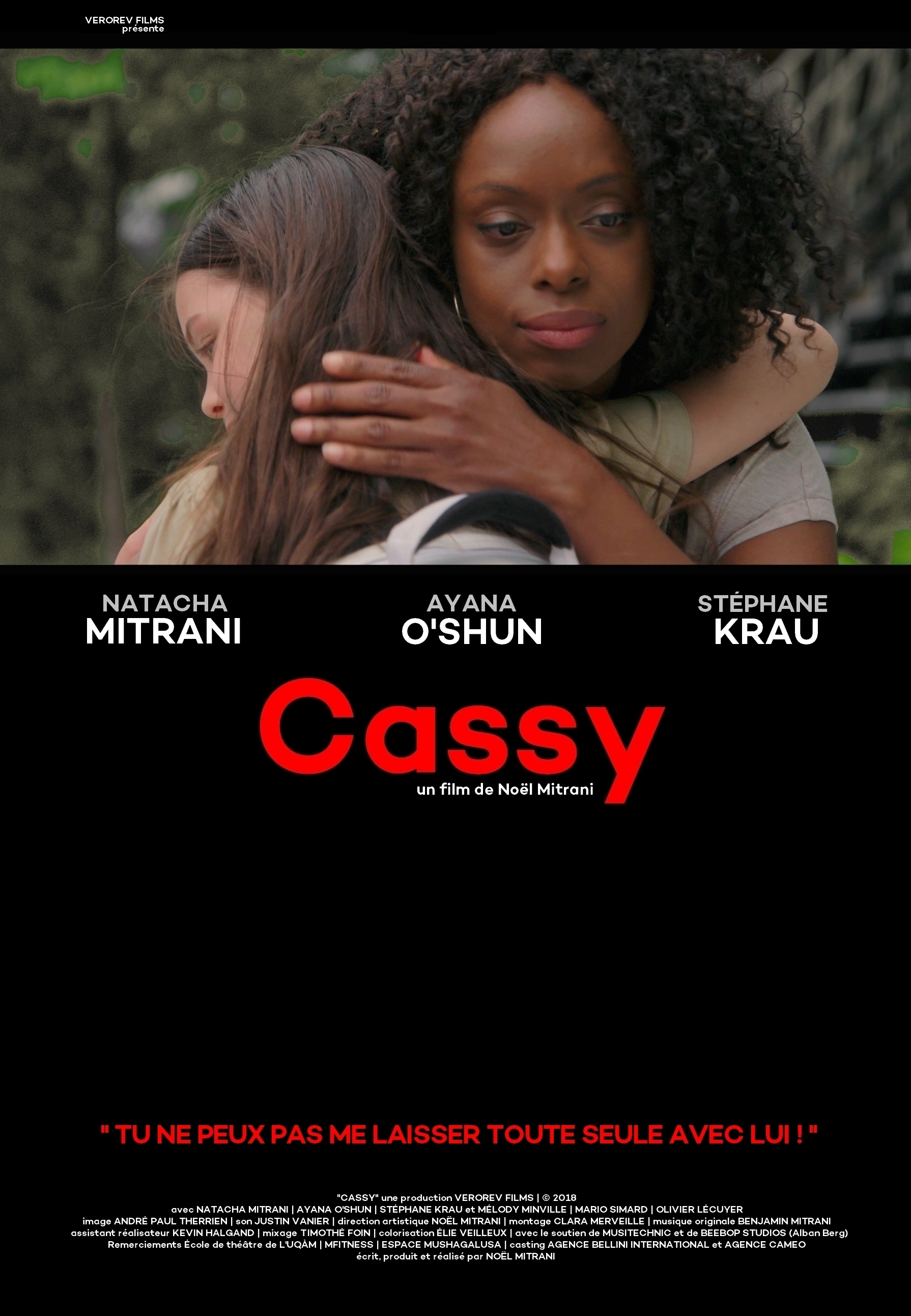
- Directed by: Noël Mitrani
- Written by: Noël Mitrani
- Produced by: Noël Mitrani
- Starring: Natacha Mitrani; Ayana O'Shun; Stéphane Krau
- Cinematography: André Paul Therrien
- Edited by: Clara Merveille
- Music by: Benjamin Mitrani
- Release date: February 23, 2019 (Rendez-vous du Cinéma Québécois)
- Running time: 104 minutes
- Country: Canada
- Language: French

Cassy is a 2019 Canadian drama film, written and directed by Noël Mitrani. The film stars Natacha Mitrani as Cassy, a young girl whose mother has recently died but who has a difficult and emotionally fraught relationship with her father (Stéphane Krau), and who connects with her music teacher Maya (Ayana O'Shun) as a new parental figure.

The film premiered on February 23, 2019, at the Rendez-vous Québec Cinéma.

== Synopsis ==
Cassy, 10, has recently lost her mother. She feels sad and lonely, but her father feels no sorrow towards the loss of his wife. The relationship between father and daughter is tense. One day, a woman named Maya enters their lives by providing Cassy with singing lessons. Maya listens to Cassy and is very loving. She gives her the affection of a mother and treats her with great care, as though Cassy were her own child. Everything would have been fine if Cassy's father had not sexually assaulted Maya.

== Cast ==
- Natacha Mitrani as Cassy
- Ayana O'Shun as Maya
- Stéphane Krau as Karl, Cassy's father
- Mélody Minville as Cassy's mother
- Olivier Lécuyer as Karl's friend
- Emilia Charron as The nanny
- Mélanie Elliott as Karl's colleague
- Guy Mushagalusa Chigoho as The art gallery owner
- Valérie Leclair as The nanny
- Mario Simard as Maya's friend
- Veronika Leclerc Strickland as Karl's colleague
- Anik Georgeault as Cassy's friend
