= Chorus (2015 film) =

2015 film

- Directed by: François Delisle
- Written by: François Delisle
- Produced by: François Delisle; Maxime Bernard
- Starring: Sébastien Ricard; Fanny Mallette
- Cinematography: François Delisle
- Edited by: François Delisle
- Production company: Films 53/12
- Distributed by: Funfilm Distribution
- Release dates: 23 January 2015 (Sundance); 6 March 2015 (Quebec)
- Running time: 96 minutes
- Country: Canada
- Languages: French; Spanish

Chorus is a 2015 Canadian drama film written and directed by François Delisle. Starring Sébastien Ricard and Fanny Mallette, the film follows a separated couple who are brought back together after the remains of their missing son are found. It premiered at the 2015 Sundance Film Festival and was later screened in the Panorama programme of the 65th Berlin International Film Festival. Its awards included the 2016 Prix collégial du cinéma québécois.

== Synopsis ==
Ten years after their eight-year-old son Hugo disappeared, separated couple Christophe and Irène remain trapped in grief. Christophe is living in Mexico, while Irène has retreated into her work as a singer in a Montreal choir. After Jean-Pierre, an imprisoned pedophile, confesses to abducting and murdering Hugo, the discovery of the boy’s remains brings Christophe and Irène back together and forces them to face their son’s death and their unresolved relationship.

== Cast ==
The cast includes:

- Sébastien Ricard as Christophe
- Fanny Mallette as Irène
- Geneviève Bujold as the mother
- Pierre Curzi as the father
- Antoine L'Écuyer as Antonin
- Luc Senay as Jean-Pierre Blake
- Didier Lucien as police officer Hervé Laroche

== Production ==
The film was produced by Films 53/12. It was directed and written by François Delisle. Filming took place in January 2014 in Mexico and in February 2014 in Montreal. The film was shot in black and white.

== Release ==
Chorus had its world premiere in the World Cinema Dramatic Competition at the Sundance Film Festival on 23 January 2015. It was later selected for the Panorama programme at the 65th Berlin International Film Festival, where it had its European premiere. The film had its Canadian premiere as the closing film of the 33rd Rendez-vous du cinéma québécois on 28 February 2015, before being released in Quebec on 6 March 2015.

== Reception ==
=== Critical response ===
The Hollywood Reporter’s Justin Lowe described the film as an austere minimalist drama and noted Delisle’s use of black-and-white cinematography. He wrote that Fanny Mallette conveyed Irène’s "enduring sorrow", while Sébastien Ricard gave a "stonily stoic performance" as Christophe.

Writing for Screen Daily, Dan Fainaru described the film as a somber study of grief that would appeal to "sensitive, compassionate audiences", while observing that much of its material was familiar.

Ryan Lattanzio of IndieWire wrote that the film’s bleakness was made "palatable" by its "empathetic lead performances and silvery, hypnotic cinematography".

Films du Québec gave the film three stars out of five, highlighting its aesthetic qualities and the performances, while noting that it kept viewers somewhat at a distance.

CineVue gave the film four stars out of five, with Ed Frankl writing that it "offers profound insight" and "does not fail to move in its final, heartbreaking scenes."

=== Awards ===
Year	Award	Category	Recipient	Result
2015	Fünf Seen Film Festival	Grand Prize	François Delisle	Won
2015	Indianapolis International Film Festival	Grand Jury Prize – Best Feature	Chorus	Won
2015	Indianapolis International Film Festival	Grand Jury Prize – World Cinema Features	Chorus	Won
2016	Prix collégial du cinéma québécois		Chorus	Won
