= Lovely Day (film) =

2025 Canadian comedy-drama film

- Film poster
- French: Mille secrets mille dangers
- Directed by: Philippe Falardeau
- Written by: Philippe Falardeau
- Based on: Mille secrets mille dangers by Alain Farah
- Produced by: Luc Déry; Kim McCraw
- Starring: Neil Elias; Rose-Marie Perreault
- Cinematography: André Turpin
- Edited by: Elric Robichon
- Music by: Martin Léon
- Production company: micro_scope
- Distributed by: Les Films Opale
- Release date: September 5, 2025 (TIFF)
- Running time: 119 minutes
- Country: Canada
- Languages: French; English; Arabic

Lovely Day (French: Mille secrets mille dangers, lit. "A Thousand Secrets, a Thousand Dangers") is a 2025 Canadian comedy-drama film, written and directed by Philippe Falardeau. Adapted from the novel Mille secrets mille dangers by Alain Farah, the film stars Neil Elias as Alain, a Lebanese Canadian man struggling to navigate the emotional and interpersonal challenges that threaten to derail the day of his wedding to Virginie (Rose-Marie Perreault).

The cast also includes Hassan Mahbouba, Hiam Abou Chedid, Georges Khabbaz, Peter-Joe Salameh, Farès Chaanebi, Rose-Anne Déry, Paul Ahmarani, Paul Doucet, Natalie Tannous, Ilyes Tarmasti, Electra Codina Morelli and Bilal Baoui in supporting roles.

== Production ==
The novel's optioning for film was first announced in 2022.

Filming took place in summer and fall 2024 in Montreal. In an interview with Variety following the film's premiere, Falardeau noted that he had strongly considered cancelling the film when the September 2024 Israeli attacks against Lebanon began the day before he was set to shoot the wedding scenes, but was encouraged by the Lebanese actors in the cast to continue on the grounds that it was important to show a story of Lebanese people whose lives were not defined by war.

== Release ==
The film premiered at the 2025 Toronto International Film Festival on September 5, 2025.

On September 10, it was screened as the opening film of the Quebec City Film Festival.

== Awards ==
Award	Date of ceremony	Category	Recipient	Result	Ref.
Canadian Screen Awards	2026	Best Motion Picture	Kim McCraw, Luc Déry	Nominated	
Canadian Screen Awards	2026	Best Lead Performance in a Comedy Film	Neil Elias	Nominated	
Canadian Screen Awards	2026	Best Supporting Performance in a Comedy Film	Hassan Mahbouba	Nominated	
Canadian Screen Awards	2026	Best Supporting Performance in a Comedy Film	Rose-Marie Perreault	Nominated	
Canadian Screen Awards	2026	Best Adapted Screenplay	Philippe Falardeau	Nominated	
Canadian Screen Awards	2026	Best Hair	Lyne Lapiana	Nominated	
Rendez-vous Québec Cinéma	2026	Prix On tourne vert	micro_scope	Won	
