= Richard Lavoie =

Canadian documentary filmmaker

Richard Lavoie (born November 15, 1937) is a Canadian documentary filmmaker from Quebec.

The son of early Canadian filmmaker Herménégilde Lavoie, he began his career as a collaborator with his father.

In 2017, Les Films du 3 mars released a six-disc DVD box set comprising 27 short and feature films from throughout Lavoie's career.

== Awards ==
Year	Award	Category	Work	Result	Reference
1990	Genie Awards	Best Feature Length Documentary	The Devil's Hole (Le Trou du diable)	Nominated	
1995	Association québécoise des critiques de cinéma	Prix Luc-Perreault	Rural Route 5 (Rang 5)	Won	
1999	Prix Jutra	Best Documentary Film	Charles Daudelin (Charles Daudelin, des mains et des mots)	Nominated	
