= Two Can Play =

Two Can Play may refer to:

- Two Can Play (1926 film), an American silent drama film
- Two Can Play (1993 film), a Canadian drama film
