= Nursing home care in Canada =

Canadian aged care

Long-term care facilities in Canada exist under three types: public, subsidized and private. Public and subsidized differ only in their ownership, all other aspects of funding, admission criteria, cost to the individuals are all regulated by the Provincial governments. In Quebec, the regulatory body is the Quebec Ministry of Health and Social Services. In Ontario, for-profit companies run 57 per cent of long-term care homes, charities run 24 per cent and municipalities 17 per cent.

Private facilities are completely independent from government ownership and funding, establishing their own admission criteria. They must maintain certain provincial standards, and obtain a license from the ministry.

The French term centre d'hébergement de soins de longue durée, or CHSLD, is commonly used in both English and French to refer to nursing homes in the predominantly francophone province of Quebec. In 2020, Canadian film director François Delisle released CHSLD, a short documentary film about his aging mother's stay in a nursing home.
