= Military man =

A military man may be:

- A member of the military
- Miles Gloriosus (Latin: boastful soldier), a stock character
  - Il Capitano, also known as "Captain Fracasse" or "The Spanish Captain", a commedia dell'arte figure
  - Colonel Blimp, a British variation on the miles gloriosus character
- The Military Man (French: Le Militaire), a 2014 Canadian film
- "Military Man", a song by Gary Moore, from Run for Cover
