= Ève Cournoyer =

- Born: May 15, 1969
- Origin: Quebec, Canada
- Died: August 12, 2012 (aged 43)
- Genres: pop, rock
- Occupation: singer-songwriter
- Instruments: vocals, guitar
- Years active: 1990s–2012

Ève Cournoyer (May 15, 1969 – August 12, 2012) was a Canadian singer-songwriter from Quebec, most prominent in the 2000s. She was most noted for winning the SOCAN Songwriting Prize in the French division for her song "Tout arrive" in 2006.

Cournoyer began her career in music by writing songs while raising her daughter. She began performing at music venues in Montreal in the late 1990s, before participating in the Francofolies de Montréal in 1999. She released the demo recording Stéréotype 1 that year, before releasing her debut studio album Sabot-de-Vénus in 2002. She won a MIMI Award from the Montreal International Music Initiative in 2003 for her single "Dans les bois".

She followed up with the albums L'Écho in 2005 and Tempête in 2010, and composed music for François Delisle's film Happiness Is a Sad Song (Le bonheur c’est une chanson triste) and You (Toi).

Cournoyer died on August 12, 2012, just days after the release of her final album Le labeur d'une fleur.
