= Frontiers (2023 film) =

2023 Canadian drama film

- French: Frontières
- Directed by: Guy Édoin
- Written by: Guy Édoin
- Produced by: Félize Frappier
- Starring: Pascale Bussières; Micheline Lanctôt
- Cinematography: Nicolas Canniccioni
- Edited by: Richard Comeau
- Music by: Olivier Alary; Johannes Malfatti
- Production company: Max Films Media
- Distributed by: Sphere Films
- Release date: March 3, 2023 (RVQC)
- Running time: 95 minutes
- Country: Canada
- Language: French

Frontiers (French: Frontières) is a 2023 Canadian drama film written and directed by Guy Édoin. The film stars Pascale Bussières as Diane Messier, a woman in the Estrie region of Quebec who has descended into anxiety and paranoia following a tragic accident, leading her mother Angèle (Micheline Lanctôt) to return from her retirement in Florida in an effort to help her.

The cast also includes Christine Beaulieu, Chimwemwe Miller, Marilyn Castonguay, Patrice Godin, Maxime de Cotret, Denis Larocque, Sylvain Massé, Marie-France Marcotte, Marie-Madeleine Sarr, and Mégane Proulx.

Production on the film began in Saint-Armand, Quebec in October 2021.

The film premiered on March 3, 2023 at the Rendez-vous Québec Cinéma.
