= Two Can Play (1993 film) =

- French: Deux actrices
- Directed by: Micheline Lanctôt
- Written by: Micheline Lanctôt
- Produced by: Micheline Lanctôt
- Starring: Pascale Bussières; Pascale Paroissien; François Delisle
- Cinematography: André Gagnon; Jocelyn Simard
- Edited by: Emmanuelle Forget; Micheline Lanctôt; Pascale Paroissien
- Music by: Kate and Anna McGarrigle
- Production company: Stopfilm
- Distributed by: Alliance Atlantis
- Release date: 1993
- Running time: 95 minutes
- Country: Canada
- Language: French

Two Can Play (French: Deux actrices) is a Canadian drama film, directed by Micheline Lanctôt and released in 1993. The film stars Pascale Bussières and Pascale Paroissien as adult sisters meeting for the first time, not having previously known of each other's existence, and intersperses the dramatic storyline with scenes in which the actresses are interviewed about the process of building their characters.

The film won the L.E. Ouimet-Molson Prize from the Association québécoise des critiques de cinéma in 1994, and Lanctôt was a Genie Award nominee for Best Director at the 15th Genie Awards.

In 2023, Telefilm Canada announced that the film was one of 23 titles that will be digitally restored under its new Canadian Cinema Reignited program to preserve classic Canadian films.

== Production ==
The film received $237,000 in funding from the Canada Council.

== Works cited ==
- Marshall, Bill (2001). Quebec National Cinema. McGill–Queen's University Press. ISBN 0-7735-2103-8.
