= You (2007 film) =

- Toi
- Directed by: François Delisle
- Written by: François Delisle
- Produced by: François Delisle
- Starring: Anne-Marie Cadieux; Laurent Lucas; Marc Béland; Michelle Rossignol
- Cinematography: Sylvaine Dufaux
- Edited by: Pascale Paroissien
- Music by: Ève Cournoyer
- Production company: Films 53/12
- Distributed by: Fragments Distribution
- Release date: August 27, 2007 (MWFF)
- Running time: 87 minutes
- Country: Canada
- Language: French

You (French: Toi) is a Canadian drama film, directed by François Delisle and released in 2007. The film stars Anne-Marie Cadieux as Michèle, an emotionally troubled woman who leaves her unhappy marriage to Paul (Laurent Lucas) for her lover Thomas (Marc Béland), only to discover that being with Thomas does not make her any happier.

The film's cast also includes Ève Cournoyer, Raphaël Dury, Marie-France Lambert and Michelle Rossignol.

Cadieux received a Genie Award nomination for Best Actress at the 28th Genie Awards.
