= Pascale Bussières =

Canadian actress

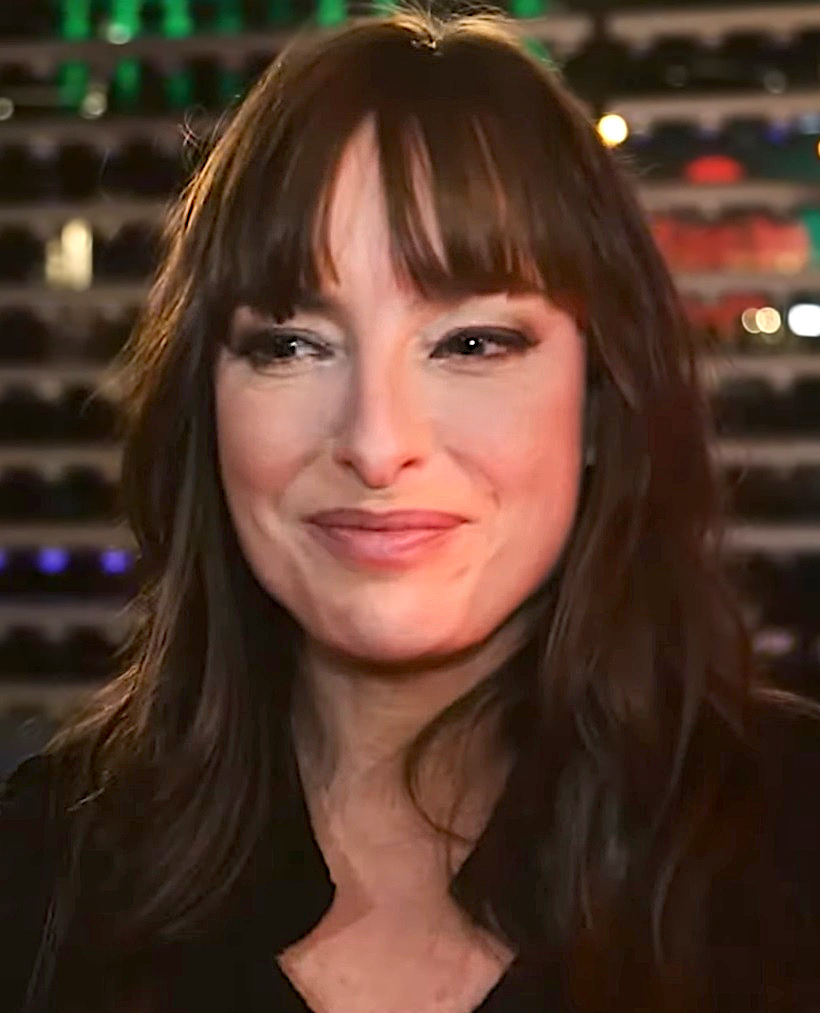
- Bussières in Tapis rouge Gala du cinéma québécois, 2016
- Born: June 27, 1968 (age 57); Montreal, Quebec, Canada

Pascale Bussières (born June 27, 1968) is a French Canadian actress. Her credits include Sonatine (1984), Eldorado (1995), When Night Is Falling (1995), August 32nd on Earth (Un 32 août sur terre) (1998), Bittersweet Memories (Ma vie en cinémascope) (2004), Afterwards (2008), The Demons (Les Démons) (2015), Death of a Ladies' Man (2020), Bootlegger (2021), and Frontiers (Frontières) (2023).

== Life and work ==
Born in Montreal, Quebec, Canada, Pascale Bussières first played a suicidal teenager in Micheline Lanctôt’s 1984 film Sonatine. She starred in Blanche, the 1993 Radio-Canada series directed by Charles Binamé, then landed a lead in Binamé’s Generation-X picture Eldorado. She played the role of a prim-and-proper mythology teacher who discovers her lesbian desires in Patricia Rozema's When Night Is Falling.

She appeared as an alienated fashion model who wants to conceive a child in Denis Villeneuve's debut feature, August 32nd on Earth (Un 32 août sur terre) (1998), and won Prix Iris for Best Actress at the 7th Jutra Awards, and for Best Performance by an Actress in a Leading Role at the 25th Genie Awards, both in 2004, for her impersonation of Quebec singing star Alys Robi in Bittersweet Memories (Ma vie en cinémascope).

Other credits include The Demons (Les Démons) (2015), Death of a Ladies' Man (2020), Bootlegger (2021), Frontiers (Frontières) (2023).

In 2023, she appeared in the music video for Karkwa's single "Parfaite à l'écran".

== Filmography ==
=== Film ===
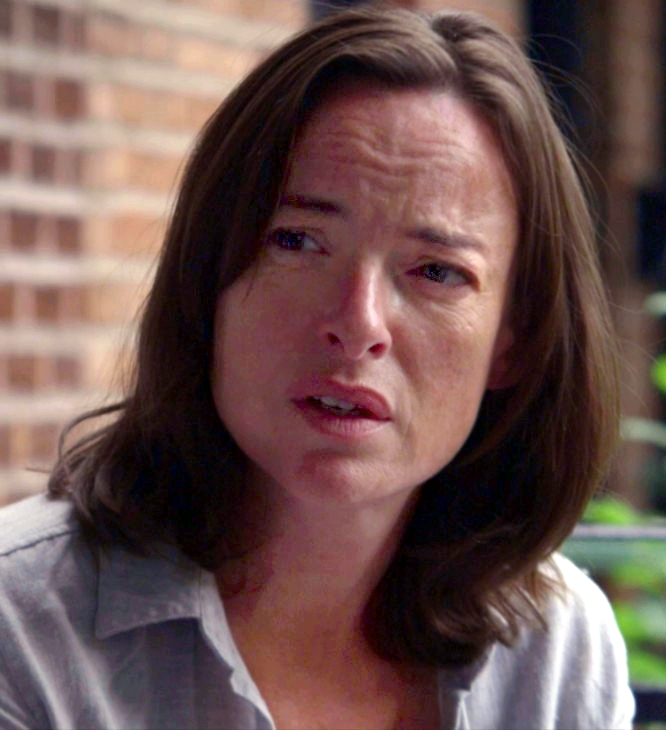
Pascale Bussières in Afterwards (Après coup) 2017

Year	Title	Role	Notes
1984	Sonatine	Chantal	
1992	Phantom Life (La Vie fantôme)	Laure	
1993	Two Can Play (Deux actrices)	Solange	
1995	When Night Is Falling	Camille Baker	
1995	Eldorado	Rita	
1996	La forêt et le bûcheron	Narrator / Forest	Short
1997	The Whole of the Moon	Sarah	
1997	Les mille merveilles de l'univers	Lily	
1997	Twilight of the Ice Nymphs	Juliana Kossel	
1997	Honeymoon	Louise	
1998	When I Will Be Gone (L'Âge de braise)	Nathalie	
1998	Streetheart (Le cœur au poing)	Marianne	
1998	August 32nd on Earth (Un 32 août sur terre)	Simone	
1999	Set Me Free (Emporte-moi)	Hana's Mother	
1999	The Five Senses	Gail	
1999	Memories Unlocked (Souvenirs intimes)	Lucie	
2000	Pandora's Beauty (La beauté de Pandore)	Pandore	
2000	Girls Can't Swim	Céline	
2000	Between the Moon and Montevideo	Juta	
2000	The Bottle (La Bouteille)	Léa	
2001	Xchange	Madeleine Renard	
2001	Die Probe Replay	Louise	
2002	Les moutons de Jacob	Pascale	
2002	Chaos and Desire (La Turbulence des fluides)	Alice Bradley	
2003	Small Cuts	Mathilde	
2004	The Blue Butterfly	Teresa Carlton	
2004	Bittersweet Memories (Ma vie en cinemascope)	Alys Robi	
2006	The Little Book of Revenge (Guide de la petite vengeance)	Sandrine	
2007	La capture	La mère	
2008	Nothing Really Matters	Carly	
2008	Afterwards (2008 film)	Anna	
2009	Suzie	Viviane	
2011	Blast from the Past	Véronica	Short
2011	Wetlands (Marécages)	Marie	
2011	French Immersion	Sylvie Tremblay	
2011	Fear of Water (La Peur de l'eau)	Élise	
2013	Émilie	Adrianna	
2014	Love Project (Love Projet)	Madame Cowboy	
2015	Ville-Marie	Marie Santerre	
2015	The Saver	Mrs. Coleville	
2015	The Demons (Les Démons)	Claire	
2015	Anna	Sophie	
2016	The Other Side of November (L'Autre côté de novembre)	Dr. Louise	
2017	We Are the Others (Nous sommes les autres)	Myriam Lambert	
2017	Afterwards (2017 film) (Après coup)	Aurélie's mother	
2017	Innocent (Innocent)	Julie	
2020	Death of a Ladies' Man	Sarah Savard	
2021	Bootlegger	Laura	
2023	Frontiers (Frontières)	Diane Messier	
2026	Someone's Daughter	Sam	

=== Television ===
Year	Title	Role	Notes
1990-91	Chambres en ville	Marie Vincent	Regular role
1991	Marilyn	Marie-Michèle St. Jean	TV series
1993	La princesse astronaute	Noémie	TV series
1993	Blanche	Blanche Pronovost	TV series
1993	Bye Bye	Various	TV series
1996	Marguerite Volant	Eléonore Volant	TV miniseries
1997	Platinum	Michelle Michaud	TV film
1997	Paparazzi	Valérie Morin	TV series
1998	Thunder Point	Jenny Baker	TV film
2000	The Secret Adventures of Jules Verne	Adrianna Locke	"Dust to Dust"
2005-07	Le cœur a ses raisons	Becky Walters	Regular role
2006	René Lévesque	Louise L'Heureux	TV miniseries
2007	Rallye Müvmedia	Pascale Bussières	TV series
2007	Race to Mars	Jackie Decelles	TV miniseries
2008	René Levesque - Le destin d'un chef	Louise L'Heureux	TV miniseries
2008-09	Belle-Baie	Margot Paulin	TV series
2010-11	Mirador	Véronique Laplace	TV series
2012	En thérapie	Marie	TV series
2014	Complexe G	Sarah	TV series
2016	Premonitions	Clara Jacob	TV series
2021	Sortez-moi de moi	Julie Mathieu	TV series

== See also ==
- List of Quebec actors
- Cinema of Quebec
- Culture of Quebec
