= The Devil's Hole =

1989 Canadian documentary film

- French: Le Trou du diable
- Directed by: Richard Lavoie
- Written by: Richard Lavoie; Yves Bélanger; Daniel Caron; Jean-Luc Martel; Marc Tremblay
- Produced by: Marc Daigle; François Dupuis; Richard Lavoie
- Cinematography: Richard Lavoie
- Edited by: Isabelle DeBloy
- Music by: Gilles Leblanc
- Production company: Association coopérative de productions audio-visuelles
- Release date: 1989
- Running time: 80 minutes
- Country: Canada
- Language: French

The Devil's Hole (French: Le Trou du diable) is a Canadian documentary film, directed by Richard Lavoie and released in 1989. The film profiles the discovery of the largest cave in Eastern Canada, the Grotte de Boischatel at Boischatel, Quebec.

The film received a Genie Award nomination for Best Feature Length Documentary at the 11th Genie Awards in 1990.
