= Between Them =

- French: Toutes les deux
- Directed by: Noël Mitrani
- Written by: Noël Mitrani
- Starring: Veronika Leclerc Strickland; Mélanie Elliott; Vitali Makarov
- Cinematography: Frédérick Breton
- Edited by: Jacob Marcoux
- Distributed by: Verorev Films
- Release date: October 3, 2021 (Tampa)
- Running time: 90 minutes
- Country: Canada
- Language: French

Between Them (French: Toutes les deux) is a 2021 Canadian romantic comedy film, written and directed by Noël Mitrani.

The film premiered in the United States at the Tampa International Gay and Lesbian Film Festival on October 3, 2021.

== Plot ==
A brilliant professor of Russian origin, Dimitri, is obsessed and convinced that his wife Lucie is cheating on him with her coworker, Horster. He hires a female private detective Valérie to follow her. Soon after, the detective develops a strong attraction to her target.

Not long into the investigation, Valérie discovers that Horster is gay. Instead of closing the case, she led Dimitri on, wanting to get closer to Lucie for herself. Valérie forces a local drug dealer to steal Lucie's phone, intending to return it herself. Lucie brings her niece to meet with Valérie to reclaim her phone, but Valérie claims to forget about bringing it and they plan to meet again the next day. The next day, Lucie sends her niece and Valérie tells her that she is a photographer and would like to photograph her aunt.

Valérie poses as "Beatrice" and meets Lucie again who eventually agrees to be photographed, and they have a picnic date which ends in sex. Valérie continues to contact Dimitri about the investigation. While Valérie and Lucie are having sex at Lucie's sister's home, they are visited by Dimitri, causing them to end their tryst. After one last sex, Valérie ends her affair, with Lucie revealing to know Valérie's true identity.

Valérie discuss the investigation with Dimitri at her office and reveals to him that Horster is gay, which convinces him that his wife is faithful. After Dimitri left, Valérie gets a surprise visit from Lucie, hinting their affair continues.

== Cast ==
- Veronika Leclerc Strickland as Valérie Cochelin-Bouchard
- Mélanie Elliott as Lucie Corel
- Vitali Makarov as Dimitri Corel
- Daniel Murphy as William Horster
- Elliott Mitrani as the young dealer
- Laurent Lucas as the follower in the street
- Natacha Mitrani as Pauline

== Awards ==
The film received a Special Jury mention at the Crossing the Screen Film Festival in 2022.
