= A Way of Life (2019 film) =

- French: Une manière de vivre
- Directed by: Micheline Lanctôt
- Written by: Micheline Lanctôt
- Produced by: André Gagnon
- Starring: Laurent Lucas; Gabrielle Lazure; Rose-Marie Perreault
- Cinematography: Simon-Pierre Gingras
- Edited by: Michel Arcand
- Production company: Lycaon Pictus
- Distributed by: Maison 4:3
- Release date: October 26, 2019 (FCIAT)
- Running time: 118 minutes
- Country: Canada
- Language: French

A Way of Life (French: Une manière de vivre) is a Canadian drama film, directed by Micheline Lanctôt and released in 2019. The film stars Laurent Lucas as Joseph, a philosophy professor who is attending an academic conference on Baruch Spinoza in Quebec, where he becomes drawn into a love triangle between Colette (Gabrielle Lazure), a recent widow, and her daughter Gabrielle (Rose-Marie Perreault), who is secretly working as a prostitute.

The cast also includes Robin Aubert, Paul Doucet, Pierre-Luc Lafontaine and Jacqueline Van de Geer in supporting roles.

The film premiered October 26, 2019 at the Abitibi-Témiscamingue International Film Festival, before going into commercial release on November 1.
