= Fake Tattoos =

- French: Les Faux tatouages
- Directed by: Pascal Plante
- Written by: Pascale Plante
- Produced by: Katerine Lefrançois
- Starring: Anthony Therrien; Rose-Marie Perreault
- Cinematography: Vincent Allard
- Edited by: Pascale Plante
- Music by: Dominique Plante
- Release date: September 2017 (Vancouver International Film Festival)
- Running time: 87 minutes
- Country: Canada
- Language: French

Fake Tattoos (French: Les faux tatouages) is a Canadian drama film, directed by Pascal Plante and released in 2017. The film stars Anthony Therrien as Theo, a young loner who meets and falls in love with Mag (Rose-Marie Perreault) at a rock concert.

== Awards ==
Perreault received a Prix Iris nomination for Revelation of the Year at the 20th Quebec Cinema Awards in 2018, and a Canadian Screen Award nomination for Best Actress at the 7th Canadian Screen Awards in 2019.

The film was shortlisted for the Prix collégial du cinéma québécois in 2019.
