= Hassan Mahbouba =

Canadian actor

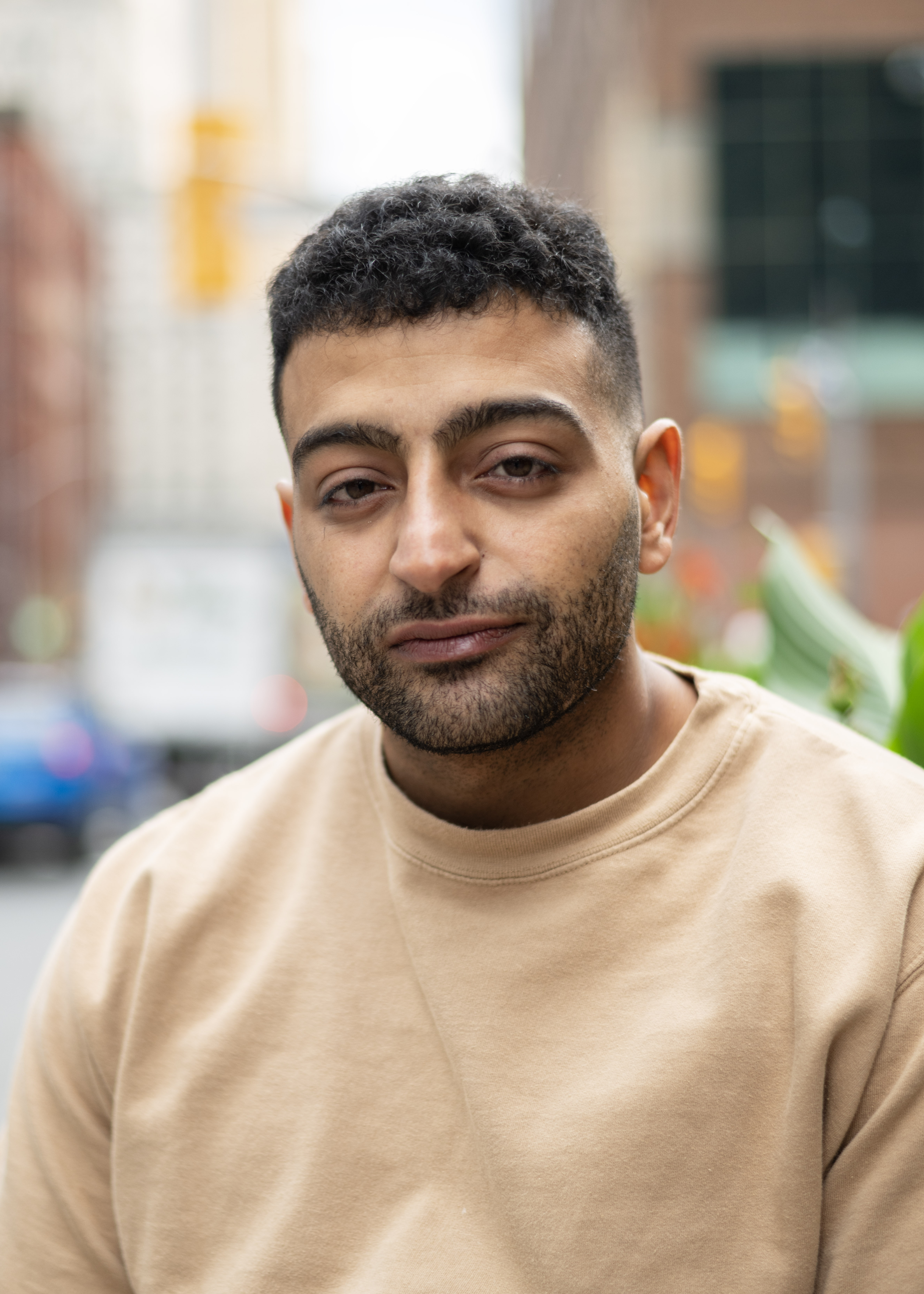
- Hassan Mahbouba at the 2025 Toronto International Film Festival
- Other name: Mackbouba
- Occupations: Actor, comedian
- Years active: 2020s–present

Hassan Mahbouba is a Canadian actor and comedian from Montreal, Quebec. He is most noted for his performance in the 2025 film Lovely Day (Mille secrets mille dangers), for which he received a Canadian Screen Award nomination for Best Supporting Performance in a Comedy Film at the 14th Canadian Screen Awards in 2026.

He regularly performs as a stand-up comedian, most commonly under the stage name Mackbouba.
