= The Cyclotron =

- Theatrical release poster
- Directed by: Olivier Asselin
- Written by: Olivier Asselin; Lucille Fluet
- Produced by: Christine Falco
- Starring: Lucille Fluet; Paul Ahmarani; Mark Antony Krupa
- Cinematography: Mathieu Laverdière
- Edited by: Michel Grou
- Music by: Patrice Dubuc; Gaëtan Gravel
- Distributed by: 108 Media; Funfilm Distribution
- Release date: October 16, 2016 (FNCM)
- Running time: 96 minutes
- Country: Canada
- Language: French

The Cyclotron (French: Le Cyclotron) is a Canadian historical drama film, directed by Olivier Asselin and released in 2016.

== Overview ==
The film stars Lucille Fluet as Simone, an Allied spy in World War II who is trying to prevent German military officer König (Paul Ahmarani) from obtaining the technology that would enable the Germans to build an atomic bomb.

Effects technician Marc Hall received a Prix Iris nomination for Best Visual Effects at the 19th Quebec Cinema Awards in 2017, and a nomination for the Canadian Screen Award for Best Visual Effects at the 6th Canadian Screen Awards in 2018.
