= Pascal Plante =

Canadian film director and screenwriter

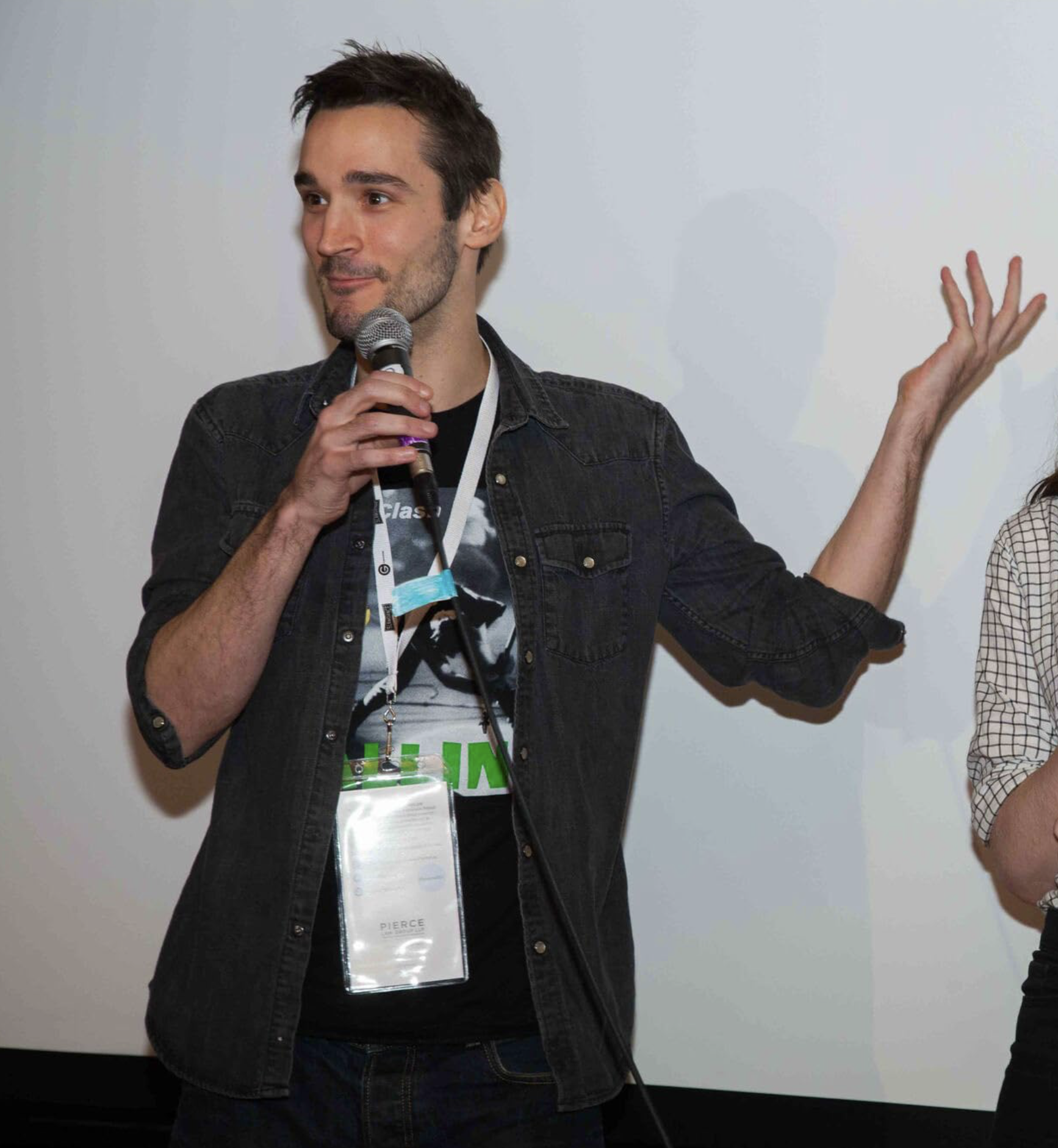
- Plante in 2016
- Born: September 3, 1988 (age 37)
- Occupations: Film director, screenwriter
- Years active: 2006–present

Pascal Plante (born September 3, 1988) is a Canadian film director and screenwriter from Quebec, whose debut feature film, Fake Tattoos (Les faux tatouages), premiered in 2017. His second film, Nadia, Butterfly, premiered in 2020 in the official selection of the Cannes Film Festival. His third feature film, Red Rooms, garnered widespread critical acclaim.

== Career ==
Plante's first IMDb film credit was as a sound recordist in 2006. He continued to work in the sound department until the early 2010s, when he transitioned into directing and writing. He wrote and directed several short films before completing his first feature film, titled Fake Tattoos (Les faux tatouages), in 2017. Plante won the Vancouver Film Critics Circle award for Best Canadian Screenplay at the Vancouver Film Critics Circle Awards 2017, and the film's lead actress Rose-Marie Perreault received a Prix Iris nomination for Revelation of the Year at the 20th Quebec Cinema Awards in 2018, and a Canadian Screen Award nomination for Best Actress at the 7th Canadian Screen Awards in 2019.

His second feature film Nadia, Butterfly was an official selection of the 2020 Cannes Film Festival, before the festival was canceled due to the COVID-19 pandemic.

Plante is a former competitive swimmer who tried out, but did not qualify, to represent Canada at the 2008 Summer Olympics, and subsequently studied film at Concordia University's Mel Hoppenheim School of Cinema.

He has also directed the short films La fleur de l'âge, Je suis un château de sable qui attend la mer, Baby Blues, Drum de marde!, Blue-Eyed Blonde (Best Canadian Short Film, VIFF 2015), Nonna and Blast Beat, and has worked as a sound mixer and editor on other film projects.

His third feature film, Red Rooms (Les chambres rouges), premiered at the 2023 Karlovy Vary Film Festival. It subsequently had its Canadian premiere at the 2023 Fantasia Film Festival, where it won several awards including Best Film, Best Screenplay, Best Score and Best Performance. The film received widespread critical acclaim upon release. On the review aggregator website Rotten Tomatoes, 96% of 78 critics' reviews are positive, with an average rating of 8.1/10. The website's consensus reads: "Anchored by Juliette Gariépy's superb portrayal of self-destructive obsession, Red Rooms is a haunting and timely trip down a particularly morbid rabbit hole."

In 2024 he served as the programmer of the Festival Vues dans la tête de.... his next film King's Daughters is set around 17th century Canada.

== Personal life ==
His brother Dominique Plante is a musician who has composed the scores to several of Pascal's films.

== Filmography ==
Year	Film
2017	Fake Tattoos (Les faux tatouages)
2020	Nadia, Butterfly
2023	Red Rooms (Les chambres rouges)
