= On the Trail of Igor Rizzi =

- French: Sur la trace d'Igor Rizzi
- Directed by: Noël Mitrani
- Written by: Noël Mitrani
- Starring: Laurent Lucas; Pierre-Luc Brillant; Isabelle Blais
- Cinematography: Christophe Debraize-Bois
- Edited by: Denis Parrot
- Distributed by: Atopia
- Release date: September 4, 2006 (Venice)
- Running time: 91 minutes
- Country: Canada
- Language: French

On the Trail of Igor Rizzi (French: Sur la trace d'Igor Rizzi) is a 2006 Canadian drama film starring Laurent Lucas, written and directed by Noël Mitrani. The film's production companies are Atopia and StanKaz Films. The distributor is also Atopia in Canada and United States. This film won the Award for Best Canadian First Feature Film at 2006’s Toronto International Film Festival.

== Plot ==
A grief-stricken and destitute French ex-soccer player has moved to Montreal, the hometown of his lost love, in an effort to recapture her presence. He is haunted by the regret of never having told her how much he loved her. To earn money he accepts to kill a certain Igor Rizzi.

== Cast ==
- Laurent Lucas as Jean-Marc Thomas
- Pierre-Luc Brillant as Jean-Michel
- Emmanuel Bilodeau as Gilbert McCoy
- Isabelle Blais as Mélanie
- Yves Allaire as Howard
- Dan Chapman as Igor Rizzi
- Jacinthe Pilote as The dead woman

== Awards ==
- 2006 Toronto International Film Festival — Best Canadian First Feature Film
- 2006 Canada's Top Ten
