= Afterwards (2017 film) =

- French: Après coup
- Directed by: Noël Mitrani
- Written by: Noël Mitrani
- Starring: Laurent Lucas; Natacha Mitrani; Laurence Dauphinais; Mohsen El Gharbi
- Cinematography: Bruno Philip
- Edited by: Amélie Labrèche
- Music by: song by Steven Emerson
- Release date: 6 October 2017
- Running time: 94 minutes
- Country: Canada
- Language: French

Afterwards (French: Après coup) is a 2017 Canadian drama film starring Laurent Lucas, written and directed by Noël Mitrani. This film tells a psychotherapeutic experience allowing to put an end to a state of post-traumatic stress disorder.

== Plot ==
A man blames himself for the tragic death of his daughter's friend. Unable to get past this event, the man spirals into depression, and then he undergoes a groundbreaking therapeutic treatment that may put him in contact with dead people.

== Cast ==
- Laurent Lucas ... as Marc
- Laurence Dauphinais ... as Florence
- Natacha Mitrani... as Marion
- Mohsen El Gharbi... as The psychologist
- Pascale Bussières... as Aurélie's mother
- Richard Fréchette... The motorist
- Véronique Mitrani... An applicant for employment
- William Akis... An applicant for employment
- Valérie Leclair... The psychiatrist
