= Dominique Plante =

Canadian musician

Dominique Plante is a Canadian musician, most noted as an instrumental and songwriting collaborator with singer-songwriter Ariane Roy.

Roy and Plante received SOCAN Songwriting Prize nominations for "Ta main" in 2021, and for "Ce n'est pas de la chance" in 2022.

Plante is the brother of film director Pascal Plante, and has composed music for his brother's films Fake Tattoos (Les Faux tatouages), La Fleur de l'âge and Red Rooms (Les Chambres rouges). For his work on Red Rooms he won the award for Best Score at the 2023 Fantasia Film Festival, and received a Prix Iris nomination for Best Original Music at the 25th Quebec Cinema Awards.
