= Neil Elias =

Canadian actor

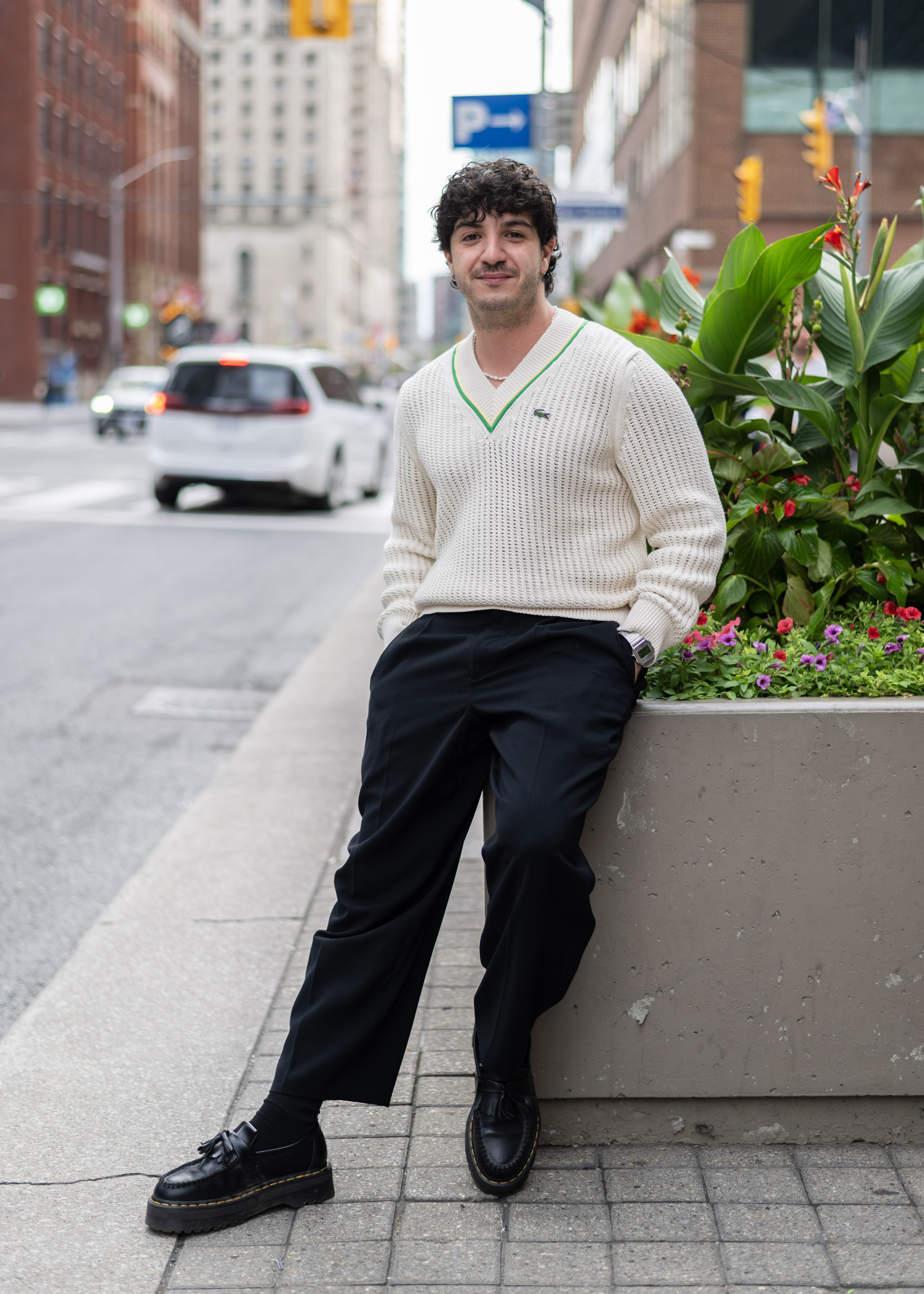
- Neil Elias at the 2025 Toronto International Film Festival
- Occupation: Actor
- Years active: 2010s–present

Neil Elias Abdelwahab, normally credited in acting roles as Neil Elias, is a Canadian actor from Quebec. He is most noted for his leading role in the 2025 film Lovely Day (Mille secrets mille dangers), for which he received a Canadian Screen Award nomination for Best Lead Performance in a Comedy Film at the 14th Canadian Screen Awards in 2026.

Prior to Lovely Day, he had recurring supporting roles in the television series Fugueuse and La vie compliquée de Léa Olivier, and played Simon in a 2024 revival of Incendies for Théàtre Duceppe.
