= Alain Farah =

Canadian writer and academic (born 1979)

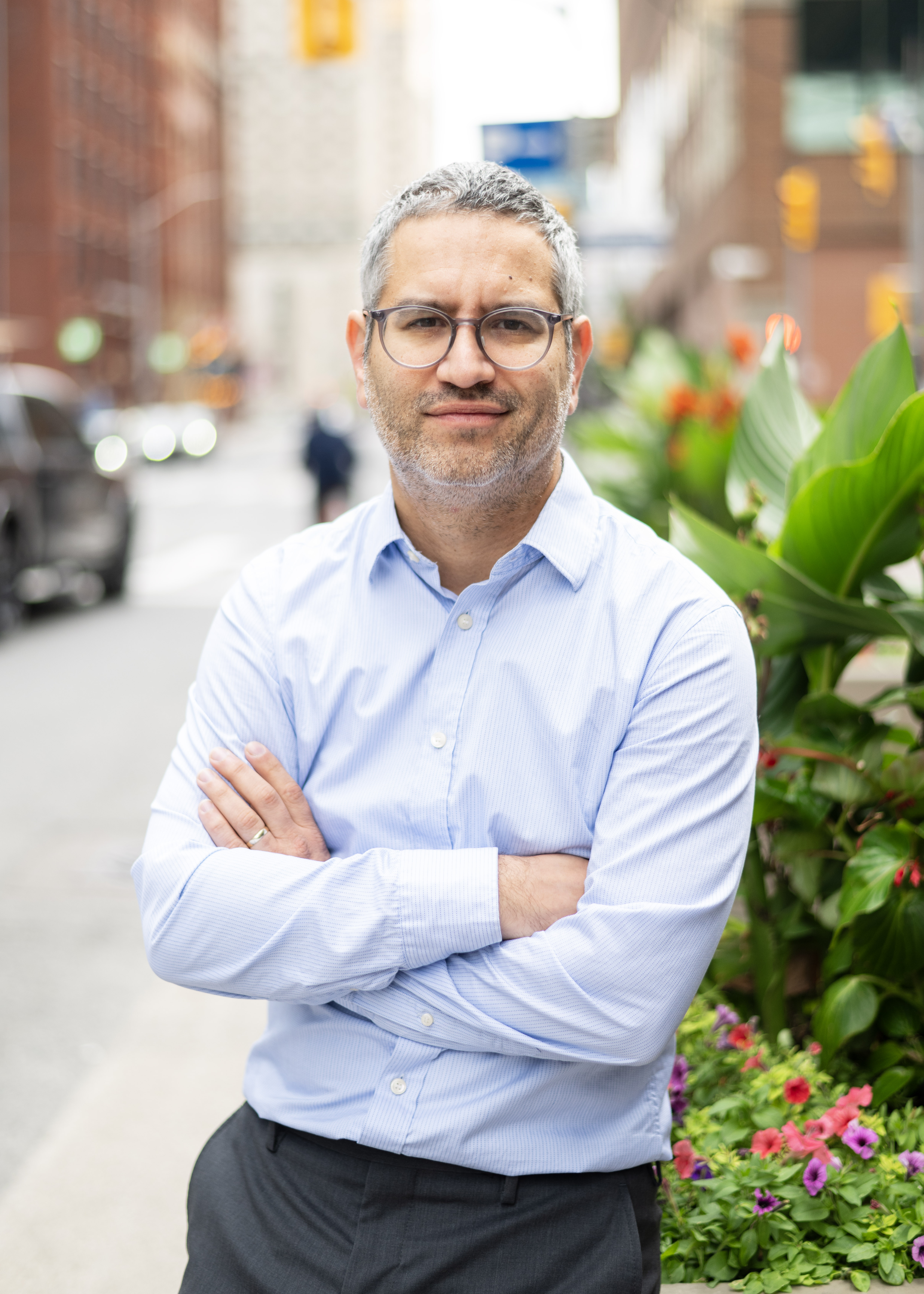
- Farah in 2025
- Born: Montreal, Quebec
- Occupations: poet, novelist
- Writing career
- Period: 2000s–present
- Notable work: Pourquoi Bologne

Alain Farah is a Canadian writer and academic. Born in Montreal, Quebec in 1979 to Lebanese immigrant parents, he has published two novels and a collection of poetry.

His 2004 poetry collection Quelque chose se détache du port was a shortlisted nominee for the Prix Émile-Nelligan, and his poem "No. 4" was adapted as a short film by director Paule Baillargeon for the 2007 film Un Cri au bonheur. His 2013 novel Pourquoi Bologne was a shortlisted nominee for the 2013 Grand Prix du livre de Montreal and for the Governor General's Award for French-language fiction at the 2014 Governor General's Awards. His short drama Les fortifications de Vauban was created and directed by Marie Brassard in 2014, and in early 2015, Pourquoi Bologne was translated to English by Lazer Lederhendler under the name Ravenscrag.

He is a professor of French literature at McGill University, and a regular contributor to Ici Radio-Canada Première's literature program Plus on est de fous, plus on lit.

He won the Governor General's Award for French fiction at the 2022 Governor General's Awards for Mille secrets mille dangers. Lovely Day, a film adaptation of the novel by Philippe Falardeau, was shot in 2024.

== Works ==
- Quelque chose se détache du port. 2004 ISBN 978-2-923400-59-4
- Matamore no 29. 2008 ISBN 978-2-923400-39-6
- Pourquoi Bologne. 2013 ISBN 978-2-896981-07-6
  - (in English) Ravenscrag. 2015 ISBN 978-1-770898-95-0
- Mille secrets, mille dangers. 2021 ISBN 978-2-896985-27-2
