= The Kate Logan Affair =

- Theatrical poster
- Directed by: Noël Mitrani
- Written by: Noël Mitrani
- Produced by: Ian Whitehead; Arnie Gelbart
- Starring: Alexis Bledel; Laurent Lucas
- Cinematography: Nathalie Moliavko-Visotzky
- Edited by: Arthur Tarnowski
- Music by: James Gelfand
- Distributed by: E1 Entertainment
- Release date: October 15, 2010 (FNC)
- Running time: 86 minutes
- Country: Canada
- Language: English

The Kate Logan Affair is a 2010 Canadian drama film written and directed by Noël Mitrani. It stars Alexis Bledel as a young psychologically unstable policewoman named Kate Logan and Laurent Lucas as a married man who find themselves caught up in a toxic affair.

== Plot ==
Benoit Gando is a French insurance agent visiting a picturesque Northern Ontario town for a conference. He has a steady marriage with a nuclear engineer and has an 11-year-old daughter. Benoit is leaving a convenience store as 27-year-old rookie cop Kate Logan mistakes him for a suspected rapist. She explains the misunderstanding and lets him go, although it is possible she made up the story to get herself introduced to him, but the question arises how did she know who he was beforehand. Later that evening she shows up at his motel and offers him a drink in order to make up for the encounter. He accepts and due to her "innocent" flirtations they end up sleeping together.

In a subsequent encounter, Kate shows Benoit how to hold and aim her service pistol. While he playfully does this, never having handled one before, the pistol goes off and a bullet is lodged in the wall of the motel room. Fearing the loss of her job, Kate drags Benoit deeper into the affair and both are now on the run. Benoit just wants to go to the police and tell them the truth that it was just an accident. She keeps him hooked by threatening to tell his wife that they slept together. She tells him that they will come up with a better solution.

The outcome of the situation is tragic, for everyone but Kate. This woman manages to destroy many lives yet comes out of it unscathed. She murders Benoit and makes it look like self-defense and manages to avoid losing her job as a cop.

== Cast ==
- Alexis Bledel – Kate Logan
- Laurent Lucas – Benoît Gando
- Noémie Godin Vigneau – Valérie Gando
- Serge Houde
- Pierre-Luc Brillant
- Ricky Mabe
- Cory Fantie
- Martin Thibaudeau
- Bruce Dinsmore
- Tarah Schwartz
- Kate Drummond

== Festivals ==
- Festival du Nouveau Cinéma 2010
