= CHSLD (film) =

2020 Canadian short documentary film

- Directed by: François Delisle
- Written by: François Delisle
- Produced by: François Delisle
- Cinematography: François Delisle
- Edited by: François Delisle
- Production company: Films 53/12
- Distributed by: Fragments Distribution
- Release date: September 5, 2020 (Trouville)
- Running time: 20 minutes
- Country: Canada
- Language: French

CHSLD is a 2020 Canadian short documentary film by François Delisle. The film is a portrait of Delisle's mother and her life in a nursing home. It should not be confused with CHSLD mon amour, a separate film directed by Danic Champoux and released the same year.

The film premiered on September 5, 2020 at the Off-Courts short film festival in Trouville-sur-Mer, France, and had its Canadian premiere at the 2020 Montreal International Documentary Festival.

It received a Canadian Screen Award nomination for Best Short Documentary at the 9th Canadian Screen Awards.
