= Philippe Falardeau =

French-Canadian film director and screenwriter

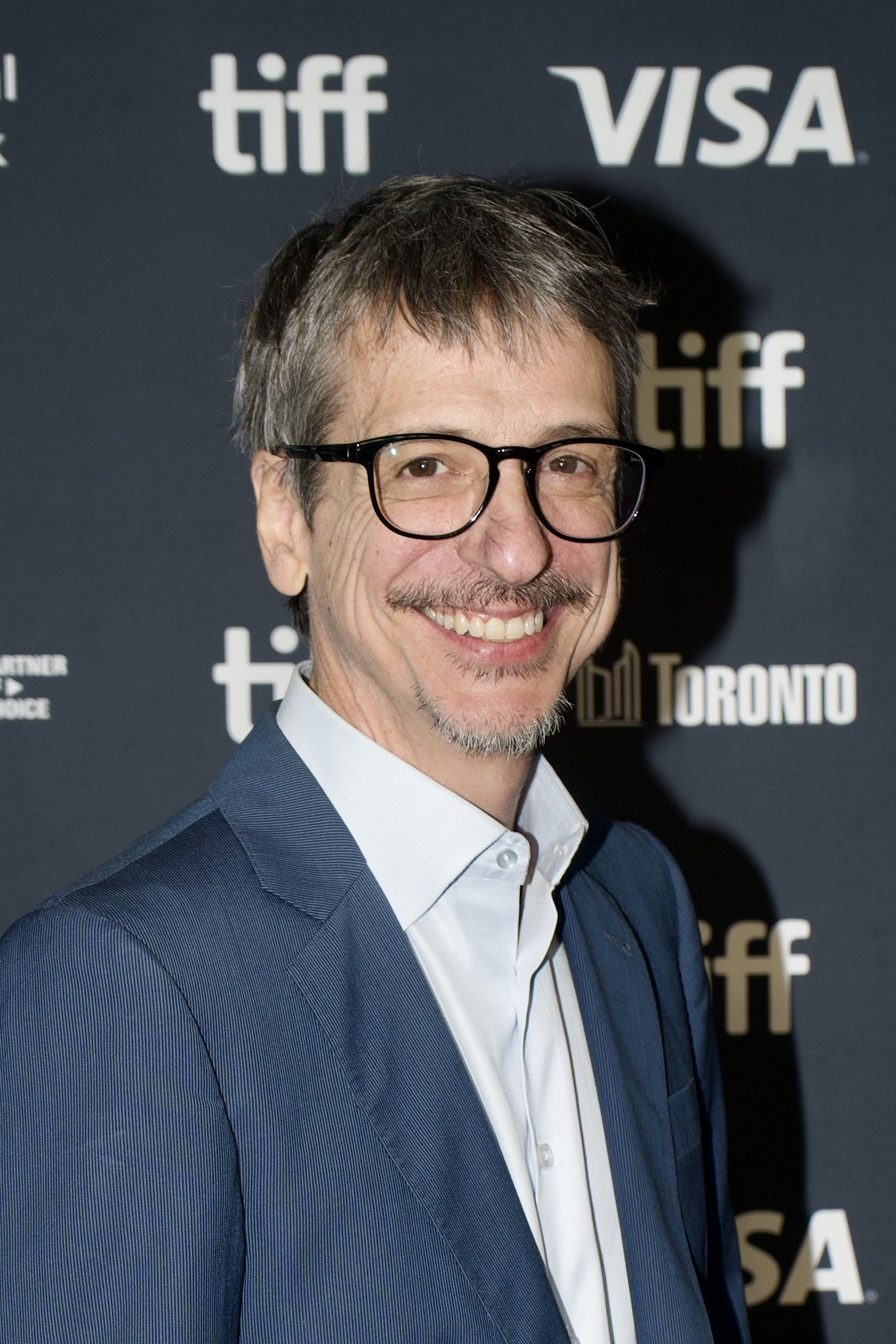
- Falardeau in 2025
- Born: February 1, 1968 (age 58); Hull, Quebec, Canada
- Education: University of Ottawa
- Occupations: Film director, screenwriter
- Years active: 2000–present

Philippe Falardeau (French pronunciation: [filip falaʁdo]; born February 1, 1968, in Hull, Quebec) is a Canadian film director and screenwriter.

== Early life ==
Falardeau was born and raised in Hull, Quebec. He later studied political science at the University of Ottawa, before travelling around the world for the Quebec competitive television series La Course destination monde, on which he emerged as the Grand Prize winner.

== Career ==
=== 2000–2010: Early work ===
His first feature film, The Left-Hand Side of the Fridge (La Moitié gauche du frigo) (2000) won Best Canadian First Feature at the 2000 Toronto International Film Festival and received a Best Screenplay nomination at the Quebec-based Jutra Awards. Falardeau also received the Claude Jutra Award at the Canadian Genies (now called Canadian Screen Awards), in 2001 for this film. For his work on his second film, Congorama (2006), Falardeau won a Genie Award in 2007 for Best Original Screenplay.

=== 2011: Breakthrough with Monsieur Lazhar ===
Falardeau received much press attention following the release of his 2011 film Monsieur Lazhar. The film premiered at the Locarno International Film Festival, where it won the Audience Award and the Variety Piazza Grande Award. It also screened at the Toronto International Film Festival in September 2011, the Whistler Film Festival in December 2011, and selected for the 2012 Sundance Film Festival. Following a wave of critical acclaim, the film was nominated for Best Foreign Language Film at the 84th Academy Awards, and also won six Canadian Screen Awards, including Best Motion Picture. At Rotten Tomatoes, the film holds a rating of 97%, based on 110 reviews and an average rating of 8.1/10.

Monsieur Lazhar grossed $2,009,517 in North America and $4,572,398 in other countries, for a worldwide total of US$6,581,915. Telefilm Canada credited it, along with Incendies (2010) and other films, with doubling domestic and worldwide gross on its works in 2011.

=== 2012–present: Further success ===
In 2014, he directed the film The Good Lie, which stars Reese Witherspoon and premiered at the 2014 Toronto International Film Festival to positive reviews. He followed this up with My Internship in Canada (2015), which premiered at the 2015 Toronto International Film Festival.

In 2015, Falardeau directed the film Chuck, which depicts the life of the heavyweight boxer Chuck Wepner, played by Liev Schreiber, and his 1975 fight with the heavyweight champion, Muhammad Ali. The film had its world premiere at the Venice Film Festival on September 2, 2016, and was subsequently released on May 5, 2017, by IFC Films. The film received positive reviews; on review aggregator website Rotten Tomatoes, the film has an approval rating of 79%, based on 70 reviews, with an average rating of 6.8/10.

Falardeau's film My Salinger Year (2020), starring Margaret Qualley and Sigourney Weaver, opened the 70th Berlin International Film Festival.

In 2023, he premiered the four-part documentary series Lac-Mégantic: This Is Not an Accident, about the Lac-Mégantic rail disaster of 2013. It was the winner of the Hot Docs Audience Award at the 2023 Hot Docs Canadian International Documentary Festival.

In 2024, he completed production on Lovely Day (Mille secrets mille dangers), an adaptation of the novel by Alain Farah.

== Filmography ==
- The Left-Hand Side of the Fridge (La Moitié gauche du frigo) (2000)
- Congorama (2006)
- It's Not Me, I Swear! (C'est pas moi, je le jure!) (2008)
- Monsieur Lazhar (2011)
- In the Name of the Son (2012)
- The Good Lie (2013)
- My Internship in Canada (2015)
- Chuck (2016)
- My Salinger Year (2020)
- Lovely Day (Mille secrets mille dangers) (2025)
