= Fanny Mallette =

Canadian actress

- Born: September 5, 1975 (age 50); Montreal, Quebec, Canada
- Occupation: Actress
- Years active: 1992–present

Fanny Mallette (born September 5, 1975) is a Canadian actress.

== Biography ==
She was nominated for a Genie Award for Best Performance by an Actress in a Supporting Role for her role in Continental, a Film Without Guns (Continental, un film sans fusil).

She has twice been nominated for a Jutra Award for Best Actress in The Orphan Muses (Les Muses orphelines) and A Girl at the Window (Une jeune fille à la fenêtre). Her other credits include Nos étés, Cheech, The Master Key (Grande Ourse: La Clé des possibles), 7 Days (Les 7 jours du Talion) and Scoop.

She won "Best Actress" at the film festival Pacific Meridian in 2011.

== Selected filmography ==
- The Woman Who Drinks (La Femme qui boit) - 2001
- The Broken Line (La ligne brisée) - 2008
- 7 Days (Les 7 jours du Talion) - 2010
- Vertige - 2012
- Arwad - 2013
- You're Sleeping Nicole (Tu dors Nicole) - 2014
- Chorus - 2015
- With Love (L'Amour) - 2019
- Apapacho - 2019
- Wars (Guerres) - 2021
- Virage - 2021
- Beaupré the Giant (Géant Beaupré) - 2024
