= The Military Man =

- Le Militaire
- Directed by: Noël Mitrani
- Written by: Noël Mitrani
- Starring: Laurent Lucas; Noémie Godin-Vigneau
- Cinematography: Bruno Philip
- Edited by: Arthur Tarnowski
- Music by: James Gelfand
- Release date: 15 October 2014
- Running time: 79 minutes
- Country: Canada
- Language: French

The Military Man (French: Le Militaire) is a 2014 Canadian drama film starring Laurent Lucas, written and directed by Noël Mitrani.

== Plot ==
A former French soldier lives in solitude in Montreal. Since returning from Afghanistan with a leg injury, this soldier has had trouble coming to grips with reality and overcoming his loneliness. The trauma caused by his memories of the conflict leads him towards an unhealthy relationship with women. One day, his behavior brings him into contact with a woman and makes him questions his motives.

== Cast ==
- Laurent Lucas as Bertrand
- Noémie Godin-Vigneau as Audrey
- Larry Day
- Harry Standjofski

== Production ==
The film was shot on super 16 mm in the style of a documentary. The film was shot on location in Montreal.
