= François Delisle =

Canadian film director, screenwriter and actor

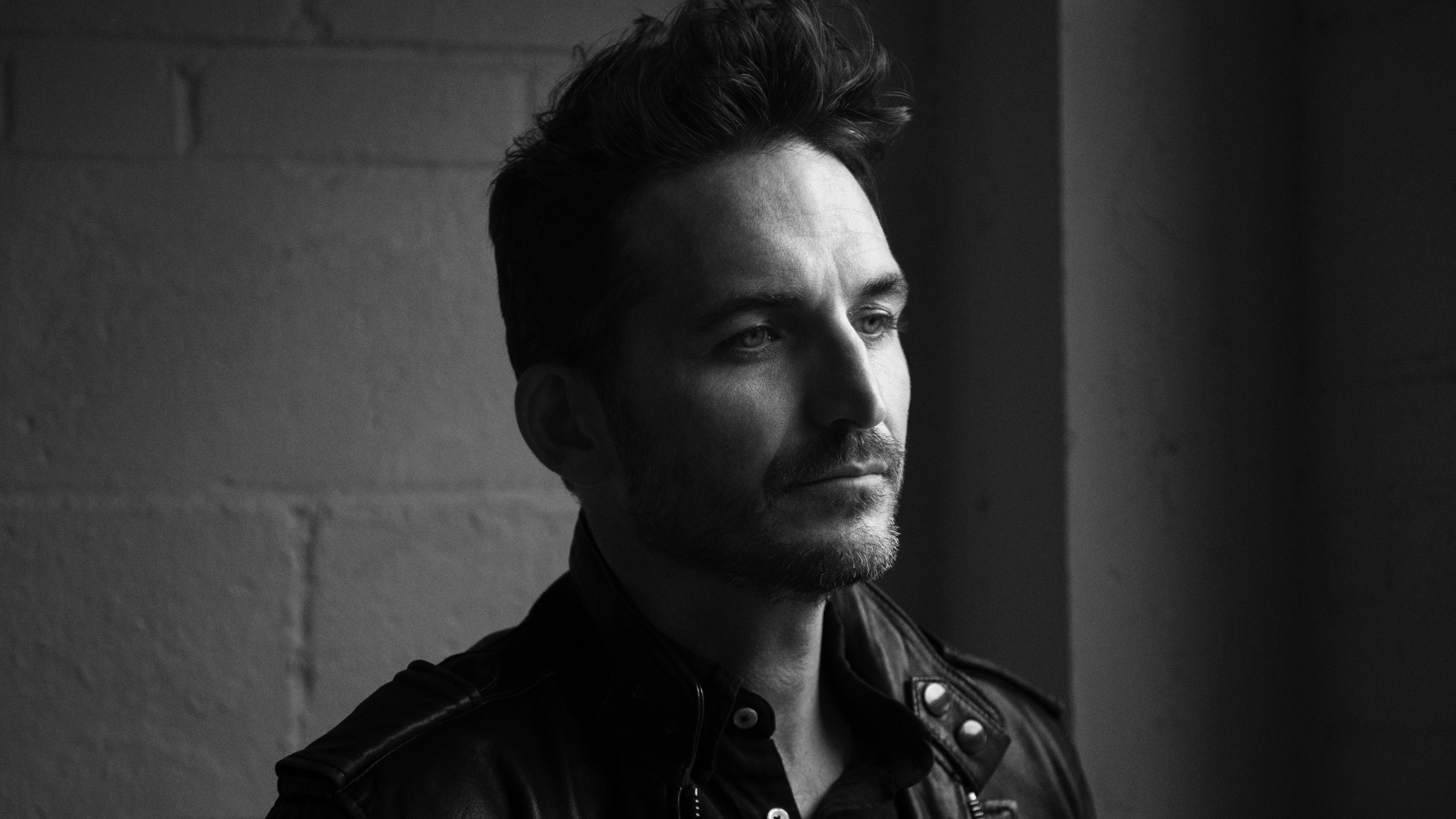
- François Delisle
- Born: March 22, 1967 (age 58); Montreal, Quebec, Canada
- Occupation: Film director • screenwriter • actor • producer • editor • cinematographer • composer.

François Delisle (born March 22, 1967) is a Canadian film director, screenwriter, producer, cinematographer, editor, actor, and composer.

== Career ==
Between 1987 and 1990, Delisle directed several experimental short films, some of which were selected for various international festivals. In 1991, he was named best new director of short and medium-length films at the Rendez-Vous du cinéma québécois for his medium-length film Beebe-Plain.

In 1994, Ruth, Delisle's first feature film, was named best feature of the year and best screenplay at the Rendez-Vous du cinéma québécois.

In 2002, Delisle founded the company Films 53/12 to direct and produce his second feature, Happiness is a Sad Song. After winning the award for best feature at the Festival international du cinéma francophone en Acadie, Happiness is a Sad Song went on to tour festivals and film events.

In 2007, Delisle released his third feature film, You.

In 2010, Twice a Woman, Delisle's fourth film, opened on Quebec screens. The film received two nominations for a Prix Iris in 2011.

Delisle's fifth feature film, The Meteor, hit Quebec screens in March 2013 after its world premiere at the Sundance Festival and the 63rd Berlin Festival.

In 2015, Chorus, Delisle's sixth feature film was in competition at the Sundance Festival and screened at the 65th Berlin Festival.

Films 53/12 is a space where Delisle champions personal, independent cinema through his involvement in both the creative and the production sides of film. He now pursues this commitment to film distribution since co-founding Fragments Distribution in 2015.

== Filmography ==
=== Director, screenwriter and producer ===
- 1989: Who cares about the sea!
- 1990: Knife and Gun
- 1991: Beebe-Plain
- 1994: Ruth
- 2004: Happiness Is a Sad Song (Le bonheur c’est une chanson triste)
- 2007: You (Toi)
- 2010: Twice a Woman (Deux fois une femme)
- 2013: The Meteor (Le Météore)
- 2015: Chorus
- 2019: Cash Nexus
- 2020: CHSLD
- 2025: Waiting for the Storms (Le Temps)

=== Producer ===
- 2014: A Journey
- 2014: What are we doing here?
- 2019: Kinship

=== Actor ===
- 1993: Two Can Play (Deux actrices) - Charles
- 2013: The Meteor (Le Météore) - Pierre

=== Cinematographer or Camera operator ===
- 1989: Who cares about the sea! (cameraman)
- 1994: Ruth (cameraman)
- 2004: Happiness is a Sad Song (cameraman)
- 2007: You (cameraman)
- 2013: The Meteor (Le Météore) (DOP)
- 2015: Chorus (DOP)

=== Editor ===
- 1989: Who cares about the sea!
- 2013: The Meteor (Le Météore)
- 2015: Chorus

=== Composer ===
- 1989: Who cares about the sea! (uncredited)
- 2007: You (credited as The States Project)
- 2010: Twice a Woman (credited as The States Project)
- 2013: The Meteor (Le Météore) (credited as The States Project)

== Style and influences ==
In an interview with Zack Sharf of IndieWire, Delisle talked about Chorus:

"Whether we like it or not, life and death are connected in our very being. The story, which is not even loosely inspired by true events, is intended to be a kind of questioning or artistic one-on-one with death and life at the same time. So I'm tackling a fundamental, inevitable and forbidden subject, forbidden because death is Western society's ultimate taboo. In that sense, I think that the experience of Chorus can be unsettling and emotional because I always try to include the spectator in the stories I tell. Lived experience makes us richer human beings, which is what I love about cinema (when it works . . .)."

== Awards ==
=== Festivals ===
- Chorus : Competition at Sundance Film Festival, Berlinale (Panorama)
- The Meteor : Sundance Film Festival (New frontiers), Berlinale (Forum)
- Twice a Woman : Busan Film Festival
- You : Munich International film festival
- Happiness is a Sad Song : Moscow International film festival

=== Awards ===
- Chorus : Public Choice at the Festival du cinéma québécois à Biscarrosse
- Chorus : Winner Prix Collégial du cinéma québécois
- Chorus : Grand Prize Fünf Seen Film Festival
- Chorus : Jury Award at the Indianapolis Film Festival
- The Meteor : Luc-Perreault/La Presse de l’Association québécoise des critiques de cinéma (AQCC) Award : Best film of 2013
- The Meteor : Grand Prize ACIC-ONF – Les Percéides for Best Canadian Movie
- Happiness is a Sad Song : Best Canadian film at Festival international du cinéma francophone en Acadie

=== Nominations ===
- Chorus : Nominated at the Gala du cinéma québécois 2016 (best actress: Fanny Mallette, best editing and Film is being shown outside of Quebec)
- The Meteor : In nomination at the 2014 Canadian Screen Awards for best pictures
- Twice a Woman : Nominated at Prix Jutra 2011 (best actress: Évelyne Rompré, best make-up : Mélanie Turcotte et Mario Soucy)
- You : Nominated at 28th Genie prize (best actress: Anne-Marie Cadieux)
- Happiness is a Sad Song : Nominated for the prize of l’Association québécoise des critiques de cinéma (best movie of the year)
- Ruth : Nominated for the prize L-E-Ouimet-Molson (best film) and nominated for the prize SARDEC (best script)
- Beebe-Plain : Nominated for the prize Claude-Jutra – O.F.Q.J. (best young filmmaker)
