= Rose-Marie Perreault =

Canadian actress

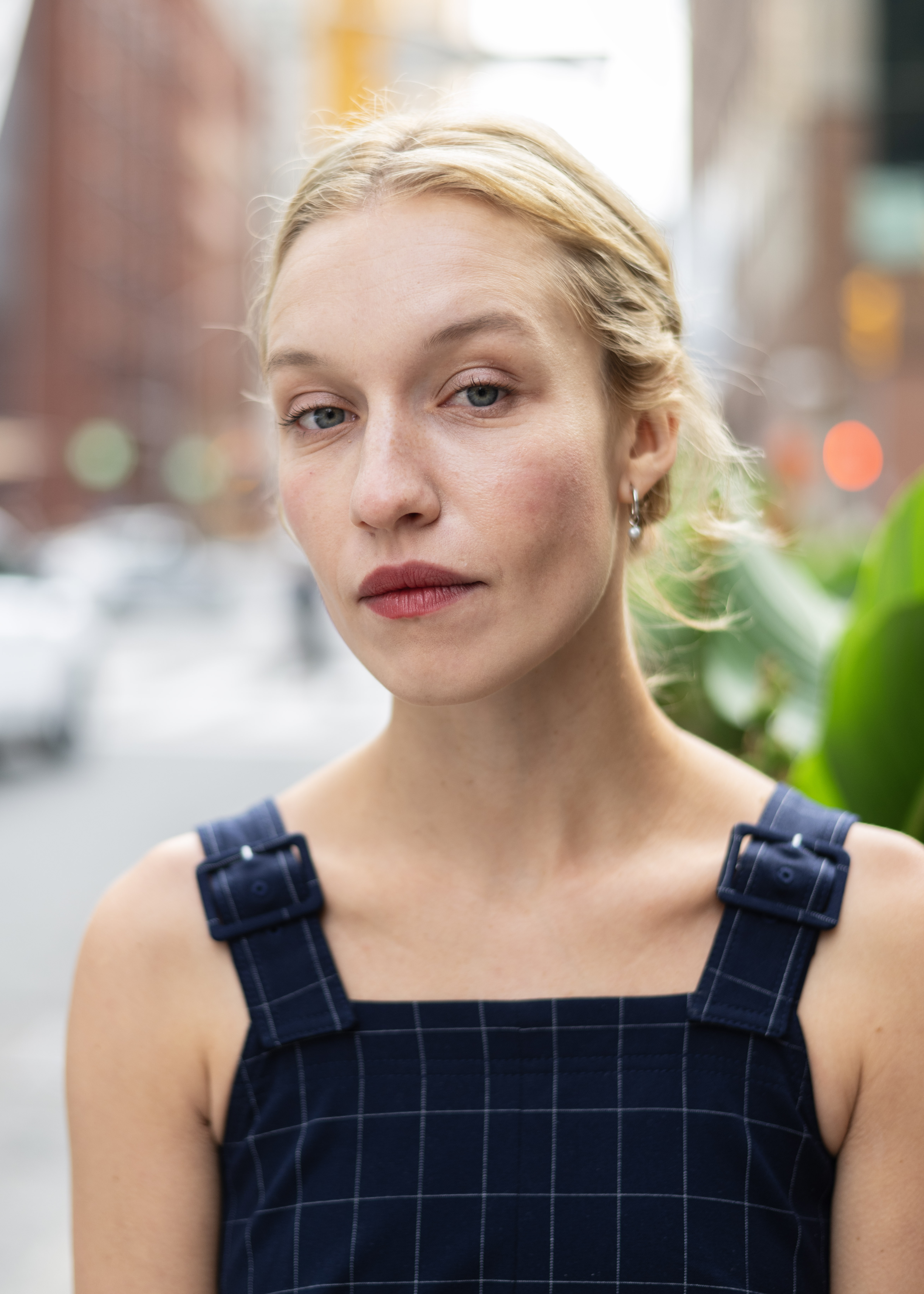
Perreault in 2025

Rose-Marie Perreault is a Canadian actress. She is most noted for her performance in the film Fake Tattoos (Les Faux tatouages), for which she received a Prix Iris nomination for Revelation of the Year at the 20th Quebec Cinema Awards in 2018, and a Canadian Screen Award nomination for Best Actress at the 7th Canadian Screen Awards in 2019.

== Filmography ==
=== Film ===
Year	Title	Role	Notes
2015	The Demons (Les Démons)	Stéphanie	
2016	My Father		
2016	Joe	Joe	
2017	Fake Tattoos (Les faux tatouages)	Mag	
2017	Le Clown		
2018	La Bolduc	Denise Bolduc	
2018	When Love Digs a Hole (Quand l'amour se creuse un trou)	Sophie	
2018	The Fall of the American Empire (La chute de l'empire américain)	Natasha	
2018	Genesis (Genèse)	Ariane	
2018	The Pornographer	Jane	
2018	Girlfriends	Amélie	
2019	We Are Gold (Nous sommes Gold)		
2019	Before We Explode (Avant qu'on explose)	Cynthia Desmeules	
2019	Dolls Don't Die	Jessica	
2019	A Way of Life (Une manière de vivre)	Gabrielle	
2020	Target Number One	Mary	
2020	Flashwood	Stephanie	
2020	The Marina (La Marina)	Juliette	
2021	A Revision (Une révision)		
2023	Dusk for a Hitman (Crépuscule pour un tueur)	Francine Lavoie	
2023	Victoire (La Cordonnière)	Victoire Du Sault	
2025	Lovely Day (Mille secrets mille dangers)	Virginie	
2025	Nesting (Peau à peau)	Pénélope	

=== Television ===
Year	Title	Role	Notes
2018-2021	Clash	Arielle Nelson	
