= Les Halles D'Anjou =

- Location: Montreal, Quebec
- Coordinates: 45°35′53″N 73°34′4″W
- Address: 7500 Galeries d'Anjou Blvd. Anjou, Quebec; H1M 3M4
- Opened: 1981
- Manager: Sandalwood Management
- Owner: Sandalwood Management
- Num. of stores: 40
- Num. of anchor tenants: 2
- Floor area: 106,100 sq ft (9,860 m^{2}).
- Floors: 1
- Parking: 755
- Website: www.hallesdanjou.com/en/home.html

Les Halles D'Anjou is a small-sized shopping mall located in the Anjou borough of Montreal, Quebec, Canada. Tenants include Archambault and the Fruiterie 440 supermarket. It is located on Des Galeries-D'Anjou Boulevard, facing the larger CF Galeries D'Anjou mall.

== History ==
Les Halles D'Anjou started as a farmer's market in 1981, and was a common public place for families to gather. It had rides for children to pass the time while their parents shopped. The farmer's market continues to operate seasonally. Family events continue to take place at the mall.

Archambault and the Fruiterie 440 supermarket are the mall's anchor tenants. Other retailers include Dollarama, Uniprix and the Odessa seafood market.
