= Laurent Lucas =

French actor (born 1965)

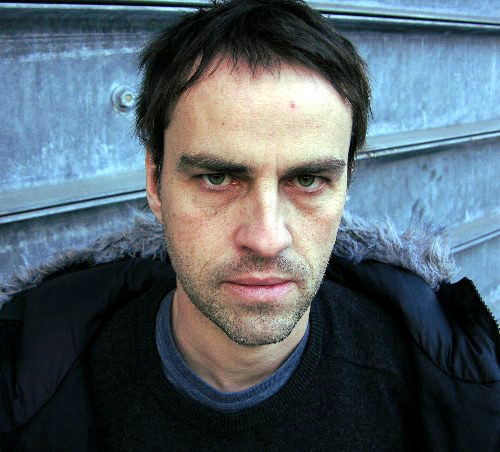
- Born: 20 July 1965 (age 61); Paris, France
- Occupations: Actor, film producer
- Years active: 1989–present

Laurent Lucas (born 20 July 1965) is a French actor.

== Life and career ==
A student of the Charles Dullin school, Lucas soon became one of the most admired young performers in the Strasbourg National Theatre. He first emerged on the scene with his role in I Hate Love, where he starred as an HIV positive man.

His most prominent part was that of a young father in the acclaimed psychological thriller Harry, He's Here To Help, before being cast in Dominik Moll's Lemming.

== Filmography ==
- 1997 : J'ai horreur de l'amour
- 1998 : HLA identique
- 1999 : Rien sur Robert
- 1999 : Pola X
- 1999 : La Nouvelle Ève
- 1999 : Haut les cœurs!
- 2000 : Harry, He's Here to Help
- 2000 : 30 ans
- 2001 : The Pornographer
- 2002 : In My Skin
- 2002 : Va, petite !
- 2003 : Tiresia
- 2003 : Who Killed Bambi?
- 2003 : Adieu
- 2003 : Rire et châtiment
- 2004 : Violence des échanges en milieu tempéré
- 2004 : Tout pour l'oseille
- 2004 : The Ordeal
- 2004 : Automne
- 2005 : Lemming
- 2005 : Les Invisibles
- 2006 : De particulier à particulier
- 2006 : On the Trail of Igor Rizzi (Sur la trace d'Igor Rizzi)
- 2007 : Contre-enquête
- 2007 : You (Toi)
- 2008 : On War
- 2008 : Mommy Is at the Hairdresser's (Maman est chez le coiffeur)
- 2008 : All That She Wants (Elle veut le chaos)
- 2010 : The Kate Logan Affair
- 2010 : Verso
- 2010 : L'impasse du désir
- 2011 : À mi-chemin
- 2012 : Je me suis fait tout petit
- 2013 : The Military Man (Le Militaire)
- 2013: The Meteor (Le Météore)
- 2013 : Le métis de Dieu (The Jewish Cardinal)
- 2014 : Witnesses
- 2014 : Alleluia
- 2015 : Floride
- 2015 : Rabid Dogs
- 2015 : Les Démons
- 2015 : Les Revenants
- 2016 : Raw
- 2016 : The Odyssey
- 2016 : Les Hommes de l'ombre
- 2017 : Le Bureau des Légendes
- 2019 : Adoration
- 2019 : A Way of Life (Une manière de vivre)
- 2019 : Mont Foster
- 2021 : Between Them (Toutes les deux)
- 2023 : Classé secret
- 2024 : Who by Fire
- 2024 : Maldoror
- 2024 : Paris Has Fallen
