= Rendez-vous Québec Cinéma =

Festival in Quebec, Canada

- Location: Quebec, Canada
- Founded: 1982
- Language: French
- Website: http://www.rvcq.com

The Rendez-vous Québec Cinéma (formerly known as Rendez-vous du cinéma québécois) is a festival created in 1982 to celebrate the cinematographic production of Quebec, Canada.

The goal of the festival is to promote the Cinema of Quebec and its makers in order to support its culture and stimulate its industry. It previously occurred in February, formerly coinciding with the ceremony awarding the Prix Iris, but in 2025 the organization announced that the event will be moved to April beginning in 2026.

Although it serves as the premiere venue for some films, it also provides a repeat screening for many films that were already released in the previous year, in order to ensure that the festival and its awards are presenting a thorough and representative portrait of the province's film industry.

Two editions are offered, one in Montreal and the other one in Quebec City. In Montreal, the event takes place at the Cinémathèque québécoise, the NFB Cinema and Cinéma Beaubien. In Quebec City, the Musée de la civilisation accommodates the festival.

In 2018, the Rendez-vous du cinéma québécois (RVCQ) changed its name for the Rendez-vous Québec Cinéma (RVQC), in order to confirm its affiliation with the Québec Cinéma organization, while keeping the same purpose.

Events held during the festival include Prends ça court, a dedicated gala for short films at which numerous awards are presented.

== Prizes ==
The festival awards various prizes :

- Prix Pierre et Yolande Perrault - best documentary
- Prix à la création artistique of the Conseil des arts et des lettres du Québec
- Prix OFQJ/Rendez-vous - best student creation, bursary of $5000
- Prix Coop vidéo - best fiction short film
- Prix TV5 - bursary of $1500 to best Franco-Canadian film from TV5 television network
- Prix du public Télé-Québec - bursary of $1500 from Télé-Québec for best film chosen by the public
- Prix Vox - bursary of $1000 to best student film from Vox television network
- Annual prizes of the Association québécoise des critiques de cinéma (AQCC) - various categories of fiction and documentary including the Prix Luc-Perreault
- Annual Prize of the Fondation Alex et Ruth Dworkin - to promote tolerance, bursary of $5000 (last awarded in 2008)

== See also ==
- List of Quebec festivals
- List of film festivals in Canada
