= Association québécoise des critiques de cinéma =

Film critics' association in Quebec, Canada

The Association québécoise des critiques de cinéma (AQCC) is a Canadian organization of film critics from Quebec.

Formed in 1973, the organization currently presents two annual awards: the Prix Luc-Perreault for best Quebec film of the year and an award for best international film of the year, It also sponsors awards at various Quebec film festivals, including the Fantasia Film Festival, the Saguenay International Short Film Festival, the Montreal International Documentary Festival, and the Festival du nouveau cinéma.

The organization's current president is Claire Valade, a critic for the film journals Panorama-cinéma and Séquences.

In 2013, the organization celebrated its 40th anniversary by sponsoring a special screening series of classic Quebec films at the Cinémathèque québécoise.

== Awards ==
=== Best International Film ===
| Year | Film | Director | Ref |
|---|---|---|---|
| 2000 | Dancer in the Dark | Lars von Trier | |
| 2000 | Yi Yi | Edward Yang | |
| 2001 | Mulholland Drive | David Lynch | |
| 2002 | Talk to Her (Hable con ella) | Pedro Almodóvar | |
| 2003 | Elephant | Gus Van Sant | |
| 2004 | Vera Drake | Mike Leigh | |
| 2005 | A History of Violence | David Cronenberg | |
| 2006 | Babel | Alejandro González Iñárritu | |
| 2007 | 4 Months, 3 Weeks and 2 Days | Cristian Mungiu | |
| 2007 | There Will Be Blood | Paul Thomas Anderson | |
| 2008 | Waltz with Bashir | Ari Folman | |
| 2009 | Inglourious Basterds | Quentin Tarantino | |
| 2010 | The Social Network | David Fincher | |
| 2011 | The Tree of Life | Terrence Malick | |
| 2012 | The Turin Horse | Béla Tarr, Ágnes Hranitzky | |
| 2013 | Blue Is the Warmest Colour (La Vie d'Adèle – Chapitres 1 & 2) | Abdellatif Kechiche | |
| 2014 | Under the Skin | Jonathan Glazer | |
| 2015 | Winter Sleep | Nuri Bilge Ceylan | |
| 2016 | Son of Saul | László Nemes | |
| 2017 | Paterson | Jim Jarmusch | |
| 2018 | First Reformed | Paul Schrader | |
| 2019 | Parasite | Bong Joon-ho | |
| 2020 | Portrait of a Lady on Fire (Portrait de la jeune fille en feu) | Céline Sciamma | |
| 2021 | Annette | Leos Carax | |
| 2022 | EO | Jerzy Skolimowski | |
| 2023 | Anatomy of a Fall (Anatomie d'une chute) | Justine Triet | |
| 2024 | Do Not Expect Too Much from the End of the World | Radu Jude | |
