= Festival international du cinéma francophone en Acadie =

Film festival in New Brunswick, Canada

Festival international du cinéma francophone en Acadie (trans: International Francophone Film Festival in Acadie), or FICFA, is a francophone international film festival held annually in Moncton, New Brunswick.

Since its creation in 1987, FICFA has grown to become the largest film festival in New Brunswick and one of the largest international francophone film festivals in North America. With an official program that includes over 100 films each year, FICFA is an important gathering of over 20,000 movie lovers and more than 150 delegates from Canada, Europe and Africa.

FICFA was created in 1987 following the Quebec City Francophonie Summit. The City of Moncton was selected to host such a festival as a tribute to those who worked for centuries in order to preserve their language and culture. The Moncton community wished to make FICFA an annual event and in 1992, Film Zone was incorporated. Film Zone is in charge of organizing FICFA, its principal event.

FICFA's mission is to promote francophone cinema in Acadie and Acadian cinema in Acadie itself and the Francophonie. Since its first edition, it has presented thousands of films from around the world.

Its objectives include developing interest for francophone cinema in Acadie, developing interest for francophone cinema in school settings, contributing to the development and promotion of the Acadian cinema industry, and encouraging partnerships with other francophone festivals.

== Prix La Vague ==
The FICFA jury, composed of professionals from Canadian and international cinema industries, attributes the Prix La Vague Awards every year in different categories:

=== 2007 ===
Category	Film	Director
Best International Feature	Real Life Is Elsewhere (La Vraie vie est ailleurs)	Frédéric Choffat
Best Canadian Feature	Twilight (La Brunante)	Fernand Dansereau
Best Documentary	Driven by Dreams (À force de rêves)	Serge Giguère
Best Documentary	Antlers (Panache)	André-Line Beauparlant
Best Acadian Feature	On a tué l'Enfant-Jésus	Renée Blanchar
Best Acadian Feature	Bootcamp Nation (Soldat à vie)	Sofi Langis
Best Acadian Short Film	Un dimanche à 105 ans	Daniel Léger
People's Choice	Un dimanche à 105 ans	Daniel Léger
People's Choice	Bonne nuit Malik!	Bruno Danan

=== 2008 ===
Category	Film	Director
Best International Feature	Under the Bombs (Sous les bombes)	Philippe Aractingi
Best International Feature	The Yellow House (La Maison jaune)	Amor Hakkar
Best Canadian Feature	All That She Wants (Elle veut le chaos)	Denis Côté
Best Documentary	The World According to Monsanto (Le Monde selon Monsanto)	Marie-Monique Robin
Best Acadian Feature	Lost Song	Rodrigue Jean
Best Acadian Short Film	La Trappe	Lina Verchery
People's Choice	Tic Tac	Marc Daigle
People's Choice	Une histoire louche	Rudi Rosenberg

Honorable mentions were also awarded to Isabelle Blais for her performance in Lyne Charlebois's film Borderline, and to Claude Fournier for his musical contributions to Rodolphe Caron's Marie-Hélène Allain en dialogue avec la pierre.

=== 2009 ===
Category	Film	Director
Best International Feature	Eastern Plays	Kamen Kalev
Best Canadian Feature	I Killed My Mother (J'ai tué ma mère)	Xavier Dolan
Best Documentary	Encirclement – Neo-Liberalism Ensnares Democracy (L'encerclement - La démocratie dans les rets du néolibéralisme)	Richard Brouillette
Best Documentary	Men for Sale (Hommes à louer)	Rodrigue Jean
Best Acadian Feature	Acadieman vs le CMA 2009	Dano Leblanc
Best Acadian Short Film	Inhabiting Dance (Habiter la danse)	Julien Cadieux
People's Choice	Paul Rodin est... Paul Rodin	Frédérick Vin
People's Choice	Alanna	Julie Plourde

=== 2010 ===
Category	Film	Director
Best International Feature	Love Like Poison (Un poison violent)	Katell Quillévéré
Best Canadian Feature	Diary of an Aid Worker (Journal d'un coopérant)	Robert Morin
Best Canadian Feature	Vital Signs (Les signes vitaux)	Sophie Deraspe
Best Documentary	Journey's End (La Belle visite)	Jean-François Caissy
Best Documentary	Salaam Isfahan	Sanaz Azari
Best Acadian Feature	No prize awarded	
Best Acadian Short Film	Voleuse de poussière	Marie-Thérèse François
People's Choice	La Pilule	Géraldine Charbonneau
People's Choice	Pixels	Patrick Jean

=== 2011 ===
Category	Film	Director
Best International Feature	The Minister (L'Exercise de l'État)	Pierre Schöller
Best International Feature	Attenberg	Athina Rachel Tsangari
Best International Short Film	Aglaée	Rudi Rosenberg
Best International Short Film	Le Sucre	Raphaël Médard
Best Canadian Feature	The Salesman (Le Vendeur)	Sébastien Pilote
Best Canadian Short Film	Ce n'est rien	Nicolas Roy
Best Canadian Short Film	Sang froid	Martin Thibaudeau
Best Documentary	Vol spécial	Fernand Melgar
Best Documentary	Godin	Simon Beaulieu
Best Acadian Feature	Moncton Vinyle	Paul Bossé
Best Acadian Feature	Roméo Savoie: La peinture du corps	Monique LeBlanc
Best Acadian Short Film	Off Route 2	Amanda Dawn Christie
People's Choice	Monsieur Lazhar	Philippe Falardeau

=== 2012 ===
Category	Film	Director
Best International Feature	Sister (L'Enfant d'en haut)	Ursula Meier
Best International Short Film	Edmond Was a Donkey (Edmond était un âne)	Franck Dion
Best Canadian Feature	War Witch (Rebelle)	Kim Nguyen
Best Canadian Feature	Catimini	Nathalie Saint-Pierre
Best Canadian Short Film	Ina Litovski	Anaïs Barbeau-Lavalette, André Turpin
Best Documentary	Bestiaire	Denis Côté
Best Acadian Feature	Last Chance (Une dernière chance)	Paul-Émile d'Entremont
Best Acadian Short Film	Une affaire de famille	Justin Guitard
People's Choice	The Nature of Frederic Back (Frédéric Back : Grandeur Nature)	Phil Comeau
People's Choice	S.W.I.T.C.H.	Jean-Pierre Desmarais

=== 2013 ===
Category	Film	Director
Best International Feature	Suzanne	Katell Quillévéré
Best International Short Film	The Day Has Conquered the Night (Le jour a vaincu la nuit)	Jean-Gabriel Périot
Best Canadian Feature	Vic and Flo Saw a Bear (Vic+Flo ont vu un ours)	Denis Côté
Best Canadian Short Film	Taxi for Two (Taxi pour deux)	Dan Popa
Best Documentary	The Missing Picture (L'Image manquante)	Rithy Panh
Best Acadian Film	Aller-Retour	Gilles Doiron
People's Choice	Dead Man Talking	Patrick Ridremont

=== 2014 ===
Category	Film	Director
Best International Feature	Party Girl	Marie Amachoukeli, Claire Burger, Samuel Theis
Best International Short Film	L'être venu d'ailleurs	Guy Bordin, Renaud de Putter
Best Canadian Feature	Felix and Meira (Félix et Meira)	Maxime Giroux
Best Canadian Short Film	The Cut (La Coupe)	Geneviève Dulude-De Celles
Best Documentary	Miron: A Man Returned from Outside the World (Miron : Un homme revenu d'en dehors du monde)	Simon Beaulieu
Best Acadian Feature	The Utrecht Seals (Les Sceaux d'Utrecht)	Paul Bossé
Best Acadian Short Film	Le paradis de boue	Chris Harrigan
People's Choice	The Utrecht Seals (Les Sceaux d'Utrecht)	Paul Bossé

=== 2015 ===
Category	Film	Director
Best International Feature	Much Loved	Nabil Ayouch
Best International Short Film	Father (Père)	Lotfi Achour
Best Canadian Feature	Our Loved Ones (Les êtres chers)	Anne Émond
Best Canadian Short Film	The Woman Who Saw the Bear (La femme qui a vu l'ours)	Joannie Lafrenière
Best Documentary	Uncle Bernard: A Counter-Lesson in Economics (Oncle Bernard - L'anti-leçon d'économie)	Richard Brouillette
Best Documentary	Pinocchio	André-Line Beauparlant
Best Acadian Feature	Le sprint au flétan	Pat Gauvin
Best Acadian Short Film	Cafétéria	Francine Hébert
People's Choice	Our Loved Ones (Les êtres chers)	Anne Émond

=== 2016 ===
Category	Film	Director
Best International Feature	Sieranevada	Cristi Puiu
Best International Short Film	Zoufs	Tom Boccara, Noé Reutenaeur, Emilien Vekemans
Best Canadian Feature	Prank	Vincent Biron
Best Canadian Short Film	My Last Summer (Mon dernier été)	Claude Demers
Best Documentary	Spectres of Shortwave (Ombres des ondes courtes)	Amanda Dawn Christie
Best Acadian Feature	Zachary Richard: Cajun Heart (Zachary Richard, toujours batailleur)	Phil Comeau
Best Acadian Short Film	Belle-île-en-mer, île bretonne et acadienne	Phil Comeau
People's Choice	Zachary Richard: Cajun Heart (Zachary Richard, toujours batailleur)	Phil Comeau

=== 2017 ===
Category	Film	Director
Best International Feature	BPM (120 battements par minute)	Robin Campillo
Best International Short Film	Five Years After the War (Cinq ans après la guerre)	Samuel Albaric, Ulysse Lefort, Martin Wiklund
Best Canadian Feature	Tadoussac	Martin Laroche
Best Canadian Short Film	Marguerite	Marianne Farley
Best Documentary	The Devil's Share (La Part du diable)	Luc Bourdon
Best Acadian Feature	Modified (Modifié)	Aube Giroux
Best Acadian Short Film	$1.25	Jeep Jones
People's Choice	Modified (Modifié)	Aube Giroux

=== 2018 ===
Category	Film	Director
Best International Feature	Capernaum	Nadine Labaki
Best International Short Film	Un monde sans bêtes	Adrien Lecouturier, Emma Benestan
Best Canadian Feature	A Colony (Une colonie)	Geneviève Dulude-De Celles
Best Canadian Feature	When Love Digs a Hole (Quand l'amour se creuse un trou)	Ara Ball
Best Canadian Short Film	Brotherhood (Ikhwène)	Meryam Joobeur
Best Canadian Short Film	Lunar-Orbit Rendezvous	Mélanie Charbonneau
Best Documentary	First Stripes (Premières armes)	Jean-François Caissy
Best Acadian Feature	The Artisans (Les artisans de l'atelier)	Daniel Léger
Best Acadian Short Film	Le Patenteux d'Harelle	Mathieu Laprise
People's Choice	Capernaum	Nadine Labaki
People's Choice	Girls of the Sun (Les filles du soleil)	Eva Husson

=== 2019 ===
Category	Film	Director
Best International Feature	Portrait of a Lady on Fire (Portrait de la jeune fille en feu)	Céline Sciamma
Best International Short Film	Le chant d'Ahmed	Foued Mansour
Best Canadian Feature	Kuessipan	Myriam Verreault
Best Canadian Short Film	Mutts (Clebs)	Halima Ouardiri
Best Canadian Short Film	Delphine	Chloé Robichaud
Best Documentary	Language Is a Love Story (La langue est donc une histoire d'amour)	Andrés Livov
Best Documentary	Mad Dog and the Butcher (Les Derniers vilains)	Thomas Rinfret
Best Acadian Feature	Pour mieux t'aimer	Gilles Doiron, Denise Bouchard
Best Acadian Short Film	Le grous poisson	Angie Richard, Tracey Richard
People's Choice	Mad Dog and the Butcher (Les Derniers vilains)	Thomas Rinfret

=== 2020 ===
Category	Film	Director
Best International Feature	Josep	Aurel
Best International Feature	Slalom	Charlène Favier
Best International Short Film	Amours synthétiques	Sarah Heitz de Chabaneix
Best Canadian Feature	Nadia, Butterfly	Pascal Plante
Best Canadian Short Film	Moon (Lune)	Zoé Pelchat
Best Documentary	Wandering: A Rohingya Story (Errance sans retour)	Mélanie Carrier, Olivier Higgins
Best Acadian Feature	The Silence (Le Silence)	Renée Blanchar
Best Acadian Short Film	Un façon d'être ensemble	Francine Hébert

An honorable mention was given to Kelly Depeault for her performance in Goddess of the Fireflies (La déesse des mouches à feu). Due to the online format, no People's Choice award was presented.

=== 2021 ===
Category	Film	Director
Best International Feature	Playground (Un monde)	Laura Wandel
Best International Short Film	La Ressource humaine	Adriana Da Fonseca
Best Canadian Feature	Drunken Birds (Les Oiseaux ivres)	Ivan Grbovic
Best Canadian Short Film	Like the Ones I Used to Know (Les Grandes claques)	Annie St-Pierre
Best Documentary	Zo Reken	Emanuel Licha
Best Acadian Short Film	Mona	Xénia Gould

=== 2022 ===
Category	Film	Director	Ref
Best International Feature	Close	Lukas Dhont	
Best International Short Film	Fairplay	Zoel Aeschbacher	
Best Canadian Feature	Rosie	Gail Maurice	
Best Canadian Short Film	Paradoxe	Aimé Majeau Beauchamp	
Best Documentary	The Super 8 Years (Les années Supr 8)	Annie Ernaux, David Ernaux-Briot	
Best Acadian Feature Film	Undertaker for Life (Croque-mort, c'est beau la vie!)	Georges Hannan	
Best Acadian Short Film	Gendrbendr	Joe Nadeau	
People's Choice	The Secret Order (L'Ordre secret)	Phil Comeau	

=== 2023 ===
Category	Film	Director	Ref
Best International Feature	Anatomy of a Fall (Anatomie d'un chute)	Justine Triet	
Best International Short Film	Bear (Ours)	Morgane Frund	
Best Canadian Feature	Red Rooms (Les Chambres rouges)	Pascal Plante	
Best Canadian Short Film	Death to the Bikini! (À mort le bikini!)	Justine Gauthier	
Best Documentary	Four Daughters (Les Filles d’Olfa)	Kaouther Ben Hania	
Best Acadian Feature Film	L'Empremier Live at Beaubassin (1970)	Rémi Belliveau	
Best Acadian Short Film	Daniel the Weaver (Daniel le tisserand)	Julien Cadieux	
People's Choice	Roots, Diaspora and War (Racines, diaspora et guerre)	Phil Comeau	

=== 2024 ===
Category	Film	Director	Ref
Best International Feature	NIKI	Céline Sallette	
Best International Short Film	Tan Lontan	Guillaume Noura	
Best Canadian Feature	Universal Language (Une langue universelle)	Matthew Rankin	
Best Canadian Short Film	Something Else (Autre chose)	Étienne Lacelle	
Best Documentary	Dahomey	Mati Diop	
Best Acadian Feature Film	Not presented as no eligible feature films were screened		
Best Acadian Short Film	Trécarré : à la source du son de la Baie Sainte-Marie	Natalie Robichaud	
People's Choice	Au travers	Beatriz Mediavilla	

=== 2025 ===
Category	Film	Director	Ref
Best International Feature	Adam's Interest (L'Intérêt d'Adam)	Laura Wandel	
Best International Short Film	La Rivière des ourses	Anaïs Mauzat	
Best International Short Film	Honorable mention: Les Jardins du paradis	Sonia Terrab	
Best Canadian Feature	My Son Came Back to Disappear (Mon fils ne revint que sept jours)	Yan Giroux	
Best Canadian Short Film	A Dying Tree (La Peau de l'autre)	Vincent René-Lortie	
Best Canadian Short Film	Honorable mention: My Memory-Walls (Mes mûrs-mémoire)	Axel Robin	
Best Documentary	And the Fish Fly Above Our Heads (Et les poissons volent au-dessus de nos têtes)	Dima El-Horr	
Best Acadian Feature Film	Amir My Little Prince (Amir mon petit prince)	Julien Cadieux	
Best Acadian Short Film	Ma complice	Serge Arseneault	
