= Richard Brouillette =

Canadian film director

Richard Brouillette is a Canadian film producer, director, editor and programmer.

== Biography ==
Brouillette began his career in 1989 as a film critic for Voir, a Montreal weekly. From 1990 to 1999, he worked for Cinéma Libre, a Quebecois independent distribution company, which has since folded. In 1993, he founded the artist-run centre Casa Obscura, a multidisciplinary exhibition space. Here, he runs a weekly cine-club called Les projections libérantes, for which he is also the projectionist. He has produced and directed three feature-length documentary films and directed two experimental short films. He has also produced several feature-length films, mostly documentaries.

== Filmography ==
=== As director, editor and scriptwriter ===
- 1995: Too Much is Enough (Trop c'est assez)
- 1995: Carpe diem (segment of the featurelenght group film Un film de cinéastes)
- 2008: Encirclement - Neo-Liberalism Ensnares Democracy (L'Encerclement - La démocratie dans les rets du néolibéralisme)
- 2008: Adagio for a Biker (Adagio pour un gars de bicycle, by Pascale Ferland, as co-scriptwriter)
- 2014: Prends garde à la douceur des choses (commissioned by Visions du réel)
- 2015: Uncle Bernard: A Counter-Lesson in Economics (Oncle Bernard – L'anti-leçon d'économie)
- 2017: The Dispossessed (Les dépossédés, by Mathieu Roy, as co-scriptwriter)
- 2018: Dispossession (Dépossession, by Mathieu Roy, as co-scriptwriter)

=== As producer ===
- 1995: Too Much is Enough (Trop c'est assez)
- 2005: Tree with Severed Branches (L’Arbre aux branches coupées, by Pascale Ferland, as executive producer)
- 2006: Barbers - A Men's Story (Barbiers – Une histoire d’hommes, by Claude Demers, as executive producer)
- 2007: Les désoeuvrés, by René Bail, as executive producer
- 2008: Adagio for a Biker (Adagio pour un gars de bicycle, by Pascale Ferland, as executive producer)
- 2008: Encirclement - Neo-Liberalism Ensnares Democracy (L'Encerclement - La démocratie dans les rets du néolibéralisme)
- 2009: Ladies in Blue (Les dames en bleu, by Claude Demers, as executive producer)
- 2009: Chantier, by René Bail, as executive producer
- 2015: Uncle Bernard: A Counter-Lesson in Economics (Oncle Bernard – L'anti-leçon d'économie)
- 2016: Far Away Lands (Les terres lointaines, by Félix Lamarche, as advising producer/executive producer)
- 2017: The Dispossessed (Les dépossédés, by Mathieu Roy, as executive producer)
- 2017: The Hidden River (La rivière cachée, by Jean-François Lesage, as executive producer)
- 2018: Dispossession (Dépossession, by Mathieu Roy, as executive producer)
- 2018: Dark Suns (Soleils noirs, by Julien Elie, as executive producer)
- 2020: Prayer for a Lost Mitten (Prière pour une mitaine perdue) (by Jean-François Lesage, as executive producer)

== Awards ==
- 1996: M. Joan Chalmers Award for best Canadian documentary
- 2009: Robert and Frances Flaherty Prize (Grand Prize) (11th Yamagata International Documentary Film Festival)
- 2009: Grand Prize (15th Visions du réel festival)
- 2009: Audience Award for Best feature film (6th IndieLisboa festival)
- 2009: Pierre and Yolande Perrault Award for best emerging documentary filmmaker (27th Rendez-vous du cinéma québécois)
- 2009: La Vague Award for Best documentary film (ex aequo with Hommes à louer, by Rodrigue Jean) (23rd Festival international du cinéma francophone en Acadie
- 2009: Special Jury Mention for the Amnesty International Award (6th IndieLisboa festival)
- 2014: Award from Conseil des arts et des lettres du Québec for best artist of the year in Mauricie
- 2015: La Vague Award for Best documentary film (29th Festival international du cinéma francophone en Acadie)
