= Encirclement – Neo-Liberalism Ensnares Democracy =

L'encerclement - La démocratie dans les rets du néolibéralisme
- Directed by: Richard Brouillette
- Written by: Richard Brouillette; Kathleen Fleming
- Produced by: Esteban Bernatas; Richard Brouillette
- Starring: Noam Chomsky; Ignacio Ramonet; Normand Baillargeon; Susan George
- Cinematography: Michel Lamothe
- Edited by: Richard Brouillette
- Music by: Éric Morin
- Release date: 20 November 2008 (RIDM)
- Running time: 160 minutes
- Country: Canada
- Languages: French; English

Encirclement – Neo-Liberalism Ensnares Democracy (French: L'Encerclement - La démocratie dans les rets du néolibéralisme) is a 2008 Canadian documentary film by Richard Brouillette which was awarded the Robert and Frances Flaherty Prize (Grand Prize) at the 11th Yamagata International Documentary Film Festival (Yamagata, Japan, 2009), the Grand Prize at the 15th Visions du réel festival (Nyon, Switzerland, 2009), the Audience Award for Best feature film, along with a Special Jury Mention for the Amnesty International Award, at the 6th IndieLisboa festival (Lisbon, Portugal, 2009), the Pierre and Yolande Perrault Award for Best first or second documentary at the 27th Rendez-vous du cinéma québécois (Montreal, Canada, 2009), and the La Vague Award for Best documentary film (ex aequo with Hommes à louer, by Rodrigue Jean) at the 23rd Festival international du cinéma francophone en Acadie (Moncton, Canada, 2009).

The world premiere took place at the 11th Rencontres internationales du documentaire de Montréal on November 20, 2008. The international premiere took place at the 59th Berlinale, in the International Forum of New Cinema section, on February 7, 2009.

== Synopsis ==
Drawing upon the thinking and analyses of renowned intellectuals, the documentary sketches a portrait of neo-liberal ideology and examines the various mechanisms used to impose its dictates throughout the world.

== Starring ==
- Noam Chomsky
- Ignacio Ramonet
- Normand Baillargeon
- Susan George
- Omar Aktouf
- Oncle Bernard
- Michel Chossudovsky
- François Denord
- François Brune
- Martin Masse
- Jean-Luc Migué
- Filip Palda
- Donald J. Boudreaux
