= The Acrobat (2019 film) =

2019 film

- Film poster
- French: L'Acrobate
- Directed by: Rodrigue Jean
- Screenplay by: Rodrigue Jean
- Produced by: Maxime Bernard
- Starring: Sébastien Ricard; Yury Paulau
- Cinematography: Mathieu Laverdière
- Edited by: Omar Elhamy
- Music by: Steve Bates
- Production company: Transmar Films
- Release date: October 2, 2019 (VIFF)
- Running time: 134 minutes
- Country: Canada
- Language: French

The Acrobat (French: L'Acrobate) is a Canadian erotic art film, directed by Rodrigue Jean and released in 2019. The film centres on Christophe (Sébastien Ricard) and Micha (Yury Paulau), two men who meet in an unoccupied unit in a high-rise construction project in Montreal during a snowstorm and begin an anonymous and passionate love affair in which they regularly meet back at the same unit to engage in ritualized sadomasochistic sexual acts.

The film, which borrows its initial narrative setup from the film Last Tango in Paris, is the third in Jean's trilogy of films exploring sexuality and emotional intimacy, following Lost Song and Love in the Time of Civil War.

The film premiered at the 2019 Vancouver International Film Festival, was subsequently screened at the Festival du nouveau cinéma, and had its commercial release in February 2020.

== Plot ==
Set in Montreal during a heavy winter snowfall, Christophe (Sébastien Ricard), a middle-aged businessman, and Micha (Yury Paulau), a Russian acrobat recovering from a horrific trapeze injury that has left him on crutches, meet in an unfinished apartment in a high-rise construction project while Christophe is house-hunting and Micha, homeless, is staying in the unit. Their random encounter quickly ignites a violent, animal attraction and a passionate, anonymous love affair. Christophe hastily purchases the apartment, and the two men begin meeting there every night, cutting themselves off from the outside world at the heart of winter to explore their lust without restraint. As the downtown cranes perform their hypnotic ballet outside, the men develop a dependency beyond reason, engaging in ritual-like sadomasochistic sexual acts in this fiercely sexy, no-holds-barred drama about an unbridled connection between two unashamed men.
