= Christopher Angatookalook =

Christopher Angatookalook is an Inuk athlete and actor from the Nunavik region of Quebec. He is best known for his debut film performance in the 2026 film Labrador: Autopsy of Silence (Labrador - Autopsie du silence), for which he won the award for Best Performance in an International Narrative Feature at the 2026 Tribeca Film Festival.

A competitor in traditional Inuit sports, he was a silver medalist in head pull at the 2024 Arctic Winter Games, and in kneel jump at the 2025 Avannaa Arctic Games. He is also a performer and educator with Cirqiniq and Tupiq ACT, youth circus training programs that blend circus with traditional Inuit performance.
