= Mathieu Laverdière =

Canadian cinematographer

Mathieu Laverdière is a Canadian cinematographer. He is a two-time winner at the Prix Iris, winning Best Cinematography at the 23rd Quebec Cinema Awards in 2021 for Underground (Souterrain), and Best Cinematography in a Documentary at the 26th Quebec Cinema Awards in 2024 for Mother Saigon.

He is a two-time Canadian Screen Award nominee for Best Cinematography, receiving nominations at the 3rd Canadian Screen Awards in 2015 for Henri Henri and at the 6th Canadian Screen Awards in 2018 for We Are the Others (Nous sommes les autres), and received three prior Jutra/Iris nominations for Best Cinematography at the 15th Jutra Awards in 2013 for The Torrent (Le Torrent), at the 17th Jutra Awards in 2015 for Henri Henri, and at the 22nd Quebec Cinema Awards in 2020 for And the Birds Rained Down (Il pleuvait des oiseaux).

At the 2026 Tribeca Film Festival, he won the award for Best Cinematography in an International Narrative Feature for his work on Rodrigue Jean's film Labrador: Autopsy of Silence.

== Selected filmography ==
- Lost Song - 2008
- Men for Sale (Hommes à louer) - 2008
- Twice a Woman (Deux fois une femme) - 2010
- Nuit #1 - 2011
- Wintergreen (Paparmane) - 2012
- Gabrielle - 2013
- Love in the Time of Civil War (L'amour au temps de la guerre civile) - 2014
- Our Loved Ones (Les êtres chers) - 2015
- On My Mother's Side (L'Origine des espèces) - 2015
- Shambles (Maudite poutine) - 2016
- The Cyclotron - 2016
- Family First (Chien de garde) - 2018
- Before We Explode (Avant qu'on explose) - 2019
- The Acrobat (L'Acrobate) - 2019
- Laughter (Le Rire) - 2020
- Underground (Souterrain) - 2020
- A Revision (Une révision) - 2021
- Solo - 2023
- One Summer (Le temps d'un été) - 2023
- Mother Saigon - 2023
- The Last Meal (Le Dernier repas) - 2024
- The Train (Le Train) - 2025
- Labrador: Autopsy of Silence (Labrador - Autopsie du silence) - 2026
