= Alexandre Landry =

Canadian actor

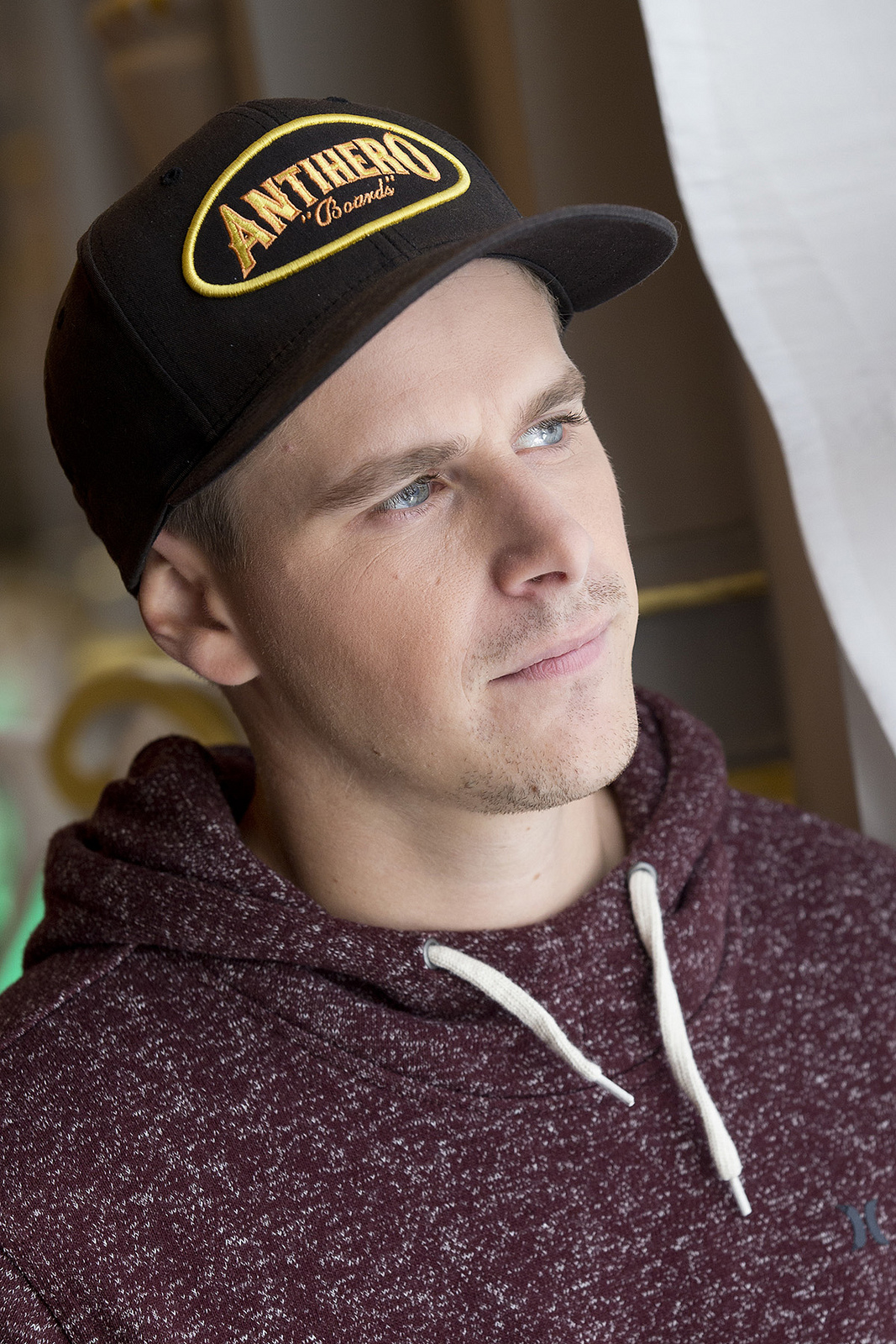
- Born: December 20, 1985 (age 40); Trois-Rivières, Quebec, Canada
- Occupations: film, television and stage actor
- Known for: Gabrielle

Alexandre Landry (born December 20, 1985) is a Canadian film, television and stage actor. He is best known for his role in the 2013 film Gabrielle, for which he garnered a Canadian Screen Award nomination as Best Supporting Actor at the 2nd Canadian Screen Awards.

== Biography ==
Born in Trois-Rivières, Landry grew up in Saint-Étienne-des-Grès, a rural village in the Mauricie region of Quebec. His father is a lumberjack and a truck driver; his mother runs a daycare centre. In 2009, he moved to Montreal to obtain his diploma from the National Theater School of Canada. To pay for his studies and apartment in Montreal, he enlisted in the Army, and then transitioned to a reservist in the Navy.

Before his film career, he worked in theatre. He played the title role in Les Aventures de Lagardère, a show performed over a hundred times across Montreal and regionally. He also acted in Chambre(s), created by Eric Jean at the Quat'Sous Theater, Euripides' Medea at the Denise-Pelletier Theater, Extreme Theater in Toronto at the Berkeley Theater. He played the protagonist, Tom, in Tom à la ferme at the Théâtre d'Aujourd'hui, created by Michel Marc Bouchard directed by Claude Poissant.

In his first role in film, he played Martin, a young intellectually disabled person, in Louise Archambault's film Gabrielle, in 2013. The film was shown in more than 20 countries and Landry won several awards for his performance.

In 2014, in Rodrigue Jean's L'Amour au temps de la guerre civile, he played the role of Alex, a young drug addict who fights to survive in the world of prostitution. He was nominated at the Gala Québec Cinéma for his performance and was part of the Rising Stars program at the Toronto International Film Festival, where the film premiered.

His other film roles have included Vincent in Chloé Robichaud's film Boundaries (Pays), Jeff in the 2015 film The Saver, Emile Gaudreault's Father and Guns 2 (De père en flic 2), the main role in The Fall of the American Empire and the 2020 film Laughter (Le Rire).

He was featured in the television series Mensonges, Unité 9, and Letterkenny.

== Filmography ==
- 2013 - Gabrielle: Martin
- 2014 - Love in the Time of Civil War (L'Amour au temps de la guerre civile): Alex
- 2015 - Boundaries (Pays): Vincent Pilon
- 2015 - Death Dive (Le Scaphandrier)
- 2016 - The Saver: Jeff
- 2017 - Father and Guns 2 (De père en flic 2): JF Côté
- 2018 - The Fall of the American Empire (La Chute de l'empire américain): Pierre-Paul Daoust
- 2018 - My Boy (Mon Boy): PY
- 2019 - Barbarians of the Bay (Les Barbares de la Malbaie): Vince Bouchard
- 2020 - Laughter (Le Rire): Gabriel
- 2024 - Hunting Daze (Jour de chasse)
- 2024 - Phoenixes (Phénix)
- 2025 - We'll Find Happiness (On sera heureux)
- 2026 - Labrador: Autopsy of Silence (Labrador - Autopsie du silence)

== Television ==
- 2010-2012 : Destinées : Olivier Côté, (TVA)
- 2014 : Mon ex à moi : Dr Jonathan Lefebvre, Avanti (Séries+)
- 2014 : Unité 9 : Patrice Gilbert, Aetios (SRC)
- 2015 : Mon ex à moi : Jonathan Lefebvre
- 2015 : Camping de l'ours : Dave, FairPlay (Vrak)
- 2016-2018 : Blue Moon : Francis Duff, Aetios (TVA)
- 2016 : 30 vies : Nicolas Valiquette (SRC)
- 2017 : Sur-Vie : Steve Bastarache
- 2017-2018 : Cheval Serpent : Julien
- 2017-2018 : Letterkenny : Jean-Carl
- 2018-2021 : True North (Les Pays d'en haut): Todore Bouchonneau
- 2018 : Les Bogues de la vie : Alex Leblanc
- 2019 : L'Échappée : Vincent Proulx
- 2019, 2021–2022 : La Faille (The Wall) : Alexandre Théberge

== Awards ==
- 2013 : Valois for best actor at the Angoulême Francophone Film Festival for Gabrielle
- 2013 : Jean-Claude-Jean Prize for best rising star in cinema at the Dieppe festival in France
- 2013 : Best Actor Award at the Gijón International Film Festival in Spain for Gabrielle
- 2014 : Vancouver Film Critics Circle Award for Best Supporting Actor in a Canadian Film for Gabrielle
- 2014 : Nominated for Best Actor at the 16th Jutra Award for Best Film
- 2014 : Nominated for Best Supporting Actor at the 2014 Canadian Screen Awards for Gabrielle
- 2014 : Toronto International Film Festival, TIFF Rising Star Program
- 2016 : Nominated at the Gala du cinéma Québécois 2016 as best actor for L'Amour au temps de la guerre civile
