= Gabrielle Marion-Rivard =

Canadian actress and singer

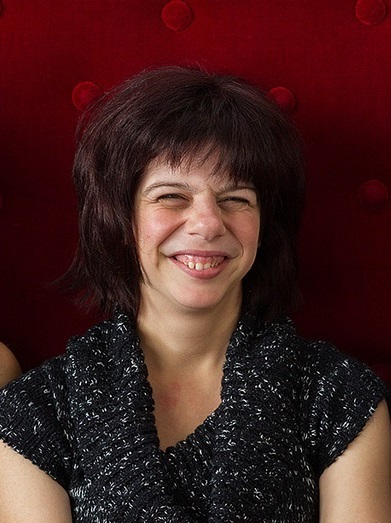
- Marion-Rivard in 2013.
- Occupations: film actor, singer
- Known for: Gabrielle

Gabrielle Marion-Rivard is a Canadian actress and singer, who won the Canadian Screen Award for Best Actress in 2014 for her performance in Gabrielle.

Marion-Rivard, who has Williams syndrome, plays a young woman with Williams syndrome who is part of a choir of developmentally disabled people. She participates in a similar choir, based in Montreal, Quebec, in real life.
