= We'll Find Happiness =

2025 Canadian drama film directed by Léa Pool

- French: On sera heureux
- Directed by: Léa Pool
- Written by: Michel Marc Bouchard
- Produced by: Lyse Lafontaine; Katarzyna Ozga; Nicolas Steil; François Tremblay
- Starring: Mehdi Meskar; Aron Archer; Alexandre Landry; Paul Ahmarani
- Cinematography: Yves Bélanger
- Music by: Kyan Bayani
- Production companies: Lyla Films; IRIS Productions
- Distributed by: Opale/Entract
- Release date: September 18, 2025 (Cinéfest)
- Running time: 101 minutes
- Countries: Canada; Luxembourg
- Languages: French; Arabic

We'll Find Happiness (French: On sera heureux) is a 2025 Canadian-Luxembourgish drama film directed by Léa Pool and written by Michel Marc Bouchard. Starring Mehdi Meskar, Aron Archer and Alexandre Landry, the film follows a Moroccan immigrant in Quebec who tries to prevent his Iranian lover’s deportation. It won the Jury Prize at the 2025 Cinemania film festival.

== Synopsis ==
The film follows Saad, a young undocumented Moroccan immigrant in Quebec who is determined to save the Iranian man he loves from deportation to Iran, where death awaits him. To do so, Saad attempts to seduce an influential spokesperson at the Ministry of Immigration.

== Cast ==
The cast includes:

- Mehdi Meskar as Saad
- Aron Archer as Reza
- Alexandre Landry as Laurent
- Céline Bonnier as Jeanne
- Sascha Ley as Gloria Price
- Jérôme Varanfrain as Martin
- Joël Delsaut as the priest
- Paul Ahmarani as the lawyer
- Shiva Gholamianzadeh as the interpreter
- Maxime Afshar as Ismael
- Yves Soutière as the prosecutor

== Production ==
Written by Michel Marc Bouchard as his first original screenplay that was not adapted from one of his theatrical plays, the film entered production in 2024 under the working title L'Habit du héros. The film was produced by Lyla Films and IRIS Productions, with financial participation from Telefilm Canada and SODEC. Filming took place over 35 days between July 23 and September 21, 2024 in Morocco, Quebec and Luxembourg.

== Release and awards ==
The film premiered in September 2025 at the 2025 Cinéfest Sudbury International Film Festival prior to going into commercial release on November 7, 2025. It won the Jury Prize at the 2025 Cinemania film festival, and later screened at the 2026 OUTshine LGBTQ+ Film Festival: Miami Edition and the 2026 Luxembourg City Film Festival.

== Critical response ==
Sarah-Louise Pelletier-Morin of Le Devoir described the film as visually strong and highlighted Yves Bélanger’s cinematography. Manon Dumais of La Presse rated the film 7 out of 10 and described it as a sensitive and compelling drama about gay immigration.
