= Yellowknife (film) =

- Theatrical release poster
- Directed by: Rodrigue Jean
- Written by: Rodrigue Jean
- Produced by: Ian Boyd; Phyllis Laing; Co-Producer: Shawn Watson
- Starring: Sébastien Huberdeau; Hélène Florent; Patsy Gallant; Philippe Clément; Brad Mann; Todd Mann; Glen Gould
- Cinematography: Yves Cape
- Edited by: Mathieu Bouchard-Malo
- Music by: Robert Marcel Lepage
- Distributed by: K-Films Amérique; Transmar Films
- Release date: February 22, 2002
- Running time: 118 minutes
- Country: Canada
- Language: English

Yellowknife is a 2002 Canadian film directed by Rodrigue Jean and starring Sébastien Huberdeau, Hélène Florent, Patsy Gallant, Philippe Clément, Brad Mann, Todd Mann and Glen Gould.

== Plot ==
Max (Sébastien Huberdeau) and Linda (Hélène Florent) travel from New Brunswick to the Northwest Territories. Along the way, they hook up with two other couples: two strippers and a night-club singer and her manager. The relationships along the way take them as far as their desperate and receding passions allow.

== Cast ==
- Sébastien Huberdeau ... Max
- Hélène Florent ... Linda
- Patsy Gallant ... Marlène Bédard
- Philippe Clément ... Johnny
- Brad Mann ... Bill
- Todd Mann ... Billy
- Glen Gould ... George
- Claude Lemieux ... Raymond
- Jean Clément
- Jennifer Cook
- Marie-Thérèse François
- Claudia Boudreau ... Barmaid

== Awards ==
- Nomination, Best Supporting Actress (Meilleure Actrice de Soutien), Patsy Gallant, Jutra Awards 2003
- Nomination, Best Score (Meilleure Musique Originale), Robert Marcel Lepage, Jutra Awards 2003
