= Gabrielle (2013 film) =

Canadian film by Louise Archambault

- Film poster
- Directed by: Louise Archambault
- Written by: Louise Archambault
- Produced by: Kim McCraw; Luc Déry
- Starring: Gabrielle Marion-Rivard; Mélissa Désormeaux-Poulin; Alexandre Landry; Robert Charlebois
- Cinematography: Mathieu Laverdière
- Edited by: Richard Comeau
- Release dates: 12 August 2013 (Locarno); 9 September 2013 (TIFF)
- Running time: 104 minutes
- Country: Canada
- Language: French

Gabrielle is a 2013 Canadian drama film directed by Louise Archambault and starring Gabrielle Marion-Rivard as Gabrielle, a young woman with Williams syndrome who participates in a choir of developmentally disabled adults, and begins a romantic relationship with her choirmate Martin (Alexandre Landry). It features a cast from a real choir for people with disabilities, with Marion-Rivard being an actress who actually has Williams syndrome.

The film premiered at the Locarno International Film Festival on 12 August 2013. It garnered six Canadian Screen Awards nominations and won two, including Best Motion Picture. Gabrielle was selected as the Canadian entry for the Best Foreign Language Film at the 86th Academy Awards, but it was not nominated.

== Plot ==
In Montreal, Gabrielle is a 22-year-old woman with Williams syndrome and diabetes, handling her own insulin injections but not living independently. She is a member of The Muses of Montreal, a musical choir for people with disabilities, at the Recreational Centre, and meets a fellow singer named Martin, with whom she develops a relationship. Her sister, Sophie, is attempting to arrange travel to meet with her boyfriend in India, but is unwilling to leave Gabrielle behind. One night, Gabrielle and Martin are caught engaging in sexual conduct publicly in the centre. Sophie and Martin's mother are called to the centre to address the matter. Sophie defends Gabrielle and Martin's right to have sex in private, as they are in love and she feels they should be able to, as adults. Sophie also asserts Gabrielle has been educated in safe sex. Martin's mother is angry at the notion, saying Martin is a virgin and that sex is different for people with disabilities. Gabrielle and Martin no longer see each other at the centre.

Gabrielle expresses frustration with her lack of autonomy to Sophie. Sophie wishes to see proof Gabrielle can live autonomously, warning her that having her own apartment will not bring Martin back. Gabrielle spends a day alone in the apartment, setting off the fire alarm with burnt toast, but when Sophie returns she is more concerned to see how Gabrielle has handled her diabetes. At the centre, Gabrielle mourns Martin's absence while The Muses prepare for a concert with Robert Charlebois. Sophie is finally persuaded to travel to India, though this means she will miss the concert. On the day of the concert, Martin and Gabrielle have sex before performing.

== Cast ==
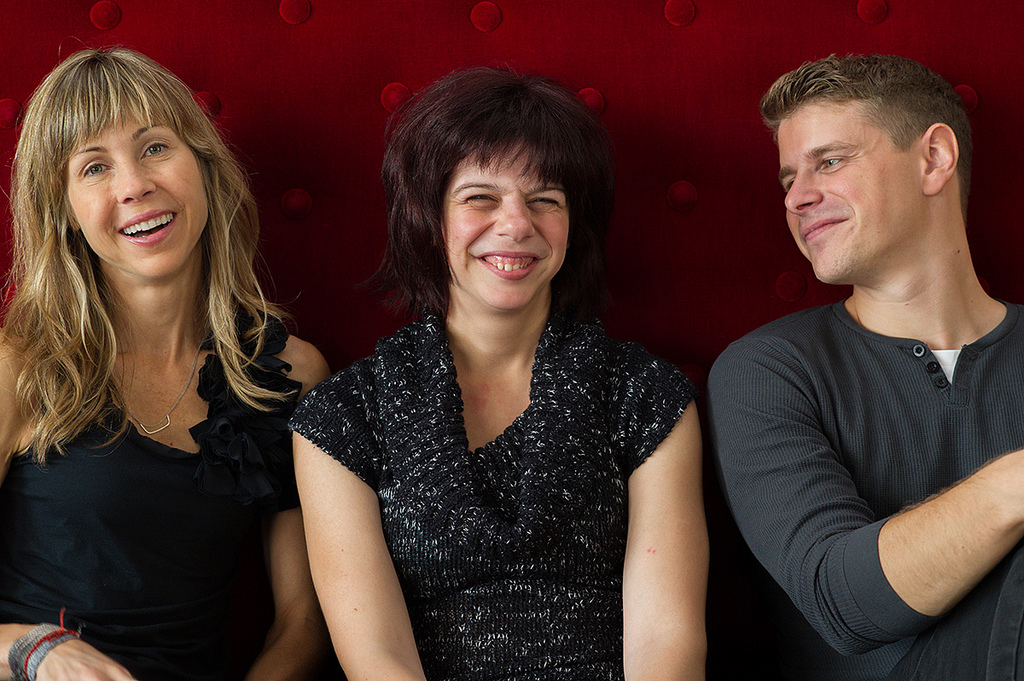
Director Louise Archambault with stars Gabrielle Marion-Rivard and Alexandre Landry.

- Gabrielle Marion-Rivard as Gabrielle
- Alexandre Landry as Martin
- Mélissa Désormeaux-Poulin as Sophie
- Vincent-Guillaume Otis as Rémi
- Benoît Gouin as Laurent
- Sébastien Ricard as Raphael
- Marie Gignac as Martin's mother
- Isabelle Vincent as Gabrielle's mother
- Robert Charlebois as himself

== Production ==
Director Louise Archambault said the story was inspired by an intellectually disabled neighbour who shared a swimming pool with her, and required help in the change room. Archambault said her neighbour had a "strong personality." The filmmakers drew the cast of the film from a real life choir for people with disabilities in Montreal, including star Gabrielle Marion-Rivard, who has Williams syndrome and sang in Les Muses. Archambault said, "They have personalities— a lot of personality— and I did learn a lot." The choir lead's performance of "Ordinaire" by Robert Charlebois, and the parallel between the lyrics and Archambault's screenplay, moved her to appeal to Charlebois to be in the film. The filmmakers had to train some of the actors with disabilities to not look at the camera during their performances.

The filmmakers also sought a man with disabilities to play Martin, but did not feel they could find someone to portray a believable romance with Marion-Rivard, and cast experienced actor Alexandre Landry. Marion-Rivard was anxious about the sex scenes, but credited Landry with making her comfortable.

The film addresses the controversial issue of sexuality and disability. Archambault consulted with producers and financiers on how to portray this in an acceptable way.

== Release ==
The film was first shown at the Locarno International Film Festival on 12 August 2013, where Archambault and Marion-Rivard said it received great applause. It was screened in the Special Presentation section at the 2013 Toronto International Film Festival.

The film opened in Toronto and Ottawa on 10 January 2014. This was followed by screenings in Edmonton on 17 January and Vancouver and Winnipeg on 24 January. Entertainment One sold distribution to Haut et Court for France and to Agora Film for Switzerland. Entertainment One also planned in October 2013 to release it in the United States.

== Reception ==
=== Critical response ===
Gabrielle has an 89% approval rating on Rotten Tomatoes, based on 27 review, and an average rating of 6.8/10. The website's critical consensus states: "Bolstered by strong, natural performances, Gabrielle's sincere look at differently abled young adults nimbly walks the line between sweet and cloying". Metacritic assigned the film a weighted average score of 70 out of 100, based on 11 critics, indicating "generally favorable reviews".

In Canada, The Globe and Mail's Liam Lacey gave the film three stars, calling it "a big-hearted drama" though lacking subtlety. Marc-André Lussier praised the film in La Presse as real and vibrant. Peter Howell of The Toronto Star gave the film three stars, writing "Gabrielle reminds us, through love and music, that perception is not reality and that prejudice is an attitude, not a truth."

Stephen Holden gave the film a positive review in The New York Times, saying Marion-Rivard saved the film from becoming condescending. Jay Weissberg, writing for Variety, called the film "uplifting," and said it was particularly great for its handling of sex and people with disabilities. Betsy Sharkey of The Los Angeles Times wrote Marion-Rivard gave the film credibility and it was difficult to deny the enjoyment of the experience.

=== Accolades ===
The film was selected as the Canadian entry for the Best Foreign Language Film at the 86th Academy Awards, but it was not nominated. It was also a finalist for Best Canadian Film at the Toronto Film Critics Association Awards 2013, alongside The Dirties and the eventual winner, Watermark.

Award	Date of ceremony	Category	Recipient(s)	Result	Ref(s)
Canadian Screen Awards	9 March 2014	Best Motion Picture	Kim McCraw and Luc Déry	Won	
Canadian Screen Awards	9 March 2014	Best Actress	Gabrielle Marion-Rivard	Won	
Canadian Screen Awards	9 March 2014	Best Supporting Actor	Alexandre Landry	Nominated	
Canadian Screen Awards	9 March 2014	Best Editing	Richard Comeau	Nominated	
Canadian Screen Awards	9 March 2014	Best Sound	Bernard Gariépy Strobl and Pierre Bertrand	Nominated	
Canadian Screen Awards	9 March 2014	Best Sound Editing	Sylvain Bellemare	Nominated	
Festival International du Film Francophone de Namur	October 2013	Audience Award	Louise Archambault	Won	
Gijón International Film Festival	2014	Best Actor	Alexandre Landry	Won	
Jutra Awards	23 March 2014	Best Film	Kim McCraw, Luc Déry and micro-scope	Nominated	
Jutra Awards	23 March 2014	Best Direction	Louise Archambault	Won	
Jutra Awards	23 March 2014	Best Screenplay	Louise Archambault	Won	
Jutra Awards	23 March 2014	Best Actor	Alexandre Landry	Nominated	
Jutra Awards	23 March 2014	Best Supporting Actor	Vincent-Guillaume Otis	Nominated	
Jutra Awards	23 March 2014	Best Supporting Actor	Benoît Gouin	Nominated	
Jutra Awards	23 March 2014	Best Supporting Actress	Mélissa Désormeaux-Poulin	Won	
Jutra Awards	23 March 2014	Best Editing	Richard Comeau	Won	
Jutra Awards	23 March 2014	Best Sound	Sylvain Bellemare, Bernard Gariépy Strobl and Pierre Bertrand	Nominated	
Jutra Awards	23 March 2014	Best International Motion Picture	Kim McCraw and Luc Déry	Won	
Locarno International Film Festival	2013	Audience Award	Louise Archambault	Won	
Lumière Awards	20 January 2014	Best French-Language Film	Louise Archambault	Nominated	
Vancouver Film Critics Circle	January 2014	Best Canadian Film	Louise Archambault	Nominated	
Vancouver Film Critics Circle	January 2014	Best Director of a Canadian Film	Louise Archambault	Nominated	
Vancouver Film Critics Circle	January 2014	Best Supporting Actor in a Canadian Film	Alexandre Landry	Won	
Prix collégial du cinéma québécois	2014	Best Film	Gabrielle	Nominated	

== See also ==
- List of submissions to the 86th Academy Awards for Best Foreign Language Film
- List of Canadian submissions for the Academy Award for Best Foreign Language Film
