= L'Empremier Live at Beaubassin (1970) =

2023 Canadian film directed by Rémi Belliveau

- Directed by: Rémi Belliveau
- Written by: Rémi Belliveau
- Produced by: Jean-Michel Vienneau
- Starring: Rémi Belliveau; Katrine Noël; Mico Roy; Jason LeBlanc; Pierre-Guy Blanchard; Marie-Andrée Gaudet
- Cinematography: Simon LeBlanc; Annie France Noël; Evar Simon
- Music by: Rémi Belliveau; Katrine Noël; Mico Roy; Jason LeBlanc; Pierre-Guy Blanchard; Marie-Andrée Gaudet
- Production company: Les Disques Acadisco
- Release date: September 25, 2023 (Momenta)
- Running time: 62 minutes
- Country: Canada
- Language: Chiac

L'Empremier Live at Beaubassin (1970) is a Canadian mockumentary film, written and directed by Rémi Belliveau and released in 2023. A pastiche of the 1972 Pink Floyd musical documentary film Pink Floyd: Live at Pompeii, the film centres on L'Empremier, a progressive rock band led by transgender musician Joan Dularge who perform rock renditions of traditional Acadian music, as they prepare for and perform a concert at the historic Fort Beauséjour site in 1970.

Joan Dularge is a character who frequently recurs in Belliveau's artistic work, which explores the Acadian cultural renaissance of the late 1960s and early 1970s through an LGBTQ perspective. The cast also includes Katrine Noël, Mico Roy, Jason LeBlanc, Pierre-Guy Blanchard and Marie-Andrée Gaudet as the other band members.

The film premiered at Montreal's MOMENTA Biennale de l'image as part of Dans la peau de l’histoire. Becoming Joan Dularge, an exhibition of Belliveau's Joan Dularge projects. It was later screened as the opening film of the 2023 Festival international du cinéma francophone en Acadie, where it won the award for Best Acadian Feature Film.
