= Mélissa Désormeaux-Poulin =

French Canadian actress (born 1981)

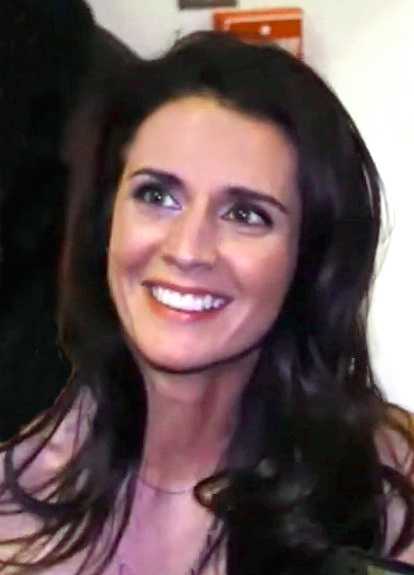
- Désormeaux-Poulin in 2017
- Born: July 1981 (age 44–45); Montreal, Quebec, Canada
- Years active: 1989–present
- Children: Florence (b. 2007); Léa (b. 2005)

Mélissa Désormeaux-Poulin (born in July 1981), is a French Canadian actress.

== Biography ==
Mélissa Désormeaux-Poulin was born to a family unconnected with the dramatic arts: her mother is a director of communications and her father is a teacher. She studied at an arts school at Lanaudière.

== Career ==
Mélissa Désormeaux-Poulin made her debut as an actress in an advertising campaign for the cereals Magic Crunch and Magic Post at the age of six. She was chosen later to act in the series Jamais deux sans toi (1989–1993), followed by the role of Marie in the series Une faim de loup (1990). Her next role was in the series Les Héritiers Duval (1994–1996). Her versatility and breadth as an actress have been showcased in roles such as the disabled Madeleine (in Asbestos, 2002), a Spanish militant (in Chartrand et Simonne, 2003), a drug dealer (in Grand Ourse, 2003) and as a disorganised rebel (in Emma, 2000–2004).

The role that brought her the most fame, especially among Canadian teens, is that in the successful À vos marques... party! franchise about a high-school swimming team. She had a regular role in the series La Promesse, which ended in 2012.

In 2008, she participated in Dédé à travers les brumes against Sébastien Ricard. In 2010, she played Jeanne Marwan in the Academy Award nominated film Incendies.

== Filmography ==
=== Cinema ===
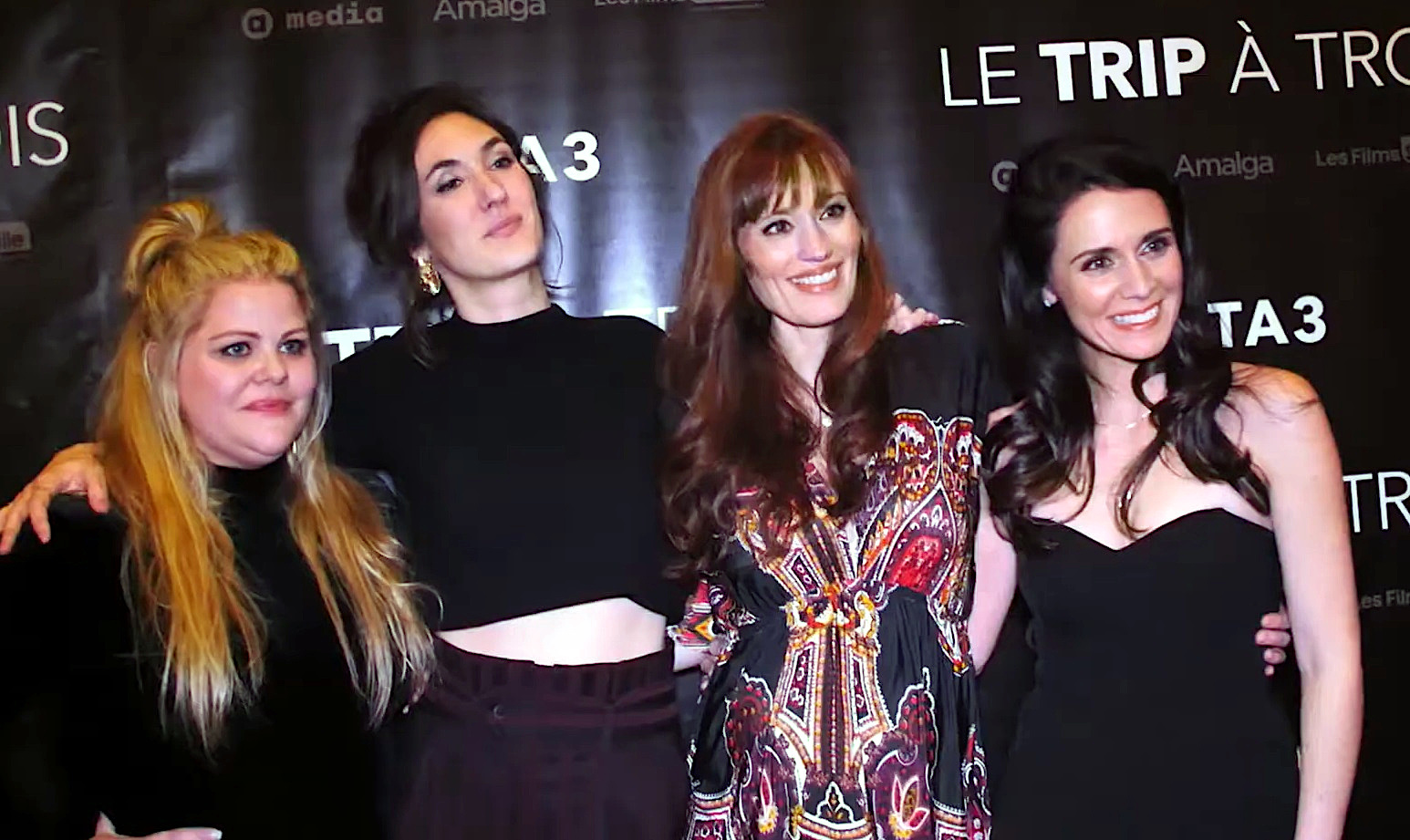
Désormeaux-Poulin – La première du film Threesome (Le Trip à trois) a eu lieu au Cinéma Impérial au centre-ville de Montréal 2017

- 2005: La Sauvegarde
- 2007: Taking the Plunge (À vos marques... party!) : Gaby Roberge
- 2009: Through the Mist (Dédé, à travers les brumes) : Sophie
- 2009: Taking the Plunge 2 (À vos marques... party! 2) : Gaby Roberge
- 2010: Incendies : Jeanne Marwan
- 2012: Beyond the Walls (Hors les murs) : Anka
- 2013: Gabrielle : Sophie
- 2017: Threesome (Le Trip à trois): Estelle
- 2018: The Far Shore (Dérive): Catherine Beauregard

=== Television ===
- 2022– : Classé secret: Rachel Miller
- 2020– : Épidémie : Chloé Roy-Bélanger
- 2016–2019: Ruptures : Ariane Beaumont
- 2014–2018: Mensonges : Carla Moreli
- 2014: 30 Vies : Lou Gauthier
- 2014: Ces gars-là : Amélie
- 2014: Subito texto : Isabelle Milani
- 2012: Mon meilleur ami : Eve
- 2012: Lance et compte : Marie-Josée Gignac
- 2010–2012: Les Rescapés : Thérèse Desbiens
- 2006–2011: La Promesse : Florence Daveluy
- 2004–2009: Il était une fois dans le trouble : Julia
- 2004: Les Bougon, c'est aussi ça la vie! : Floralie
- 2000–2004: Ramdam : Isabelle
- 2000–2004: Emma : Sara Bernard
- 2000–2004 : Le Monde de Charlotte : Judith
- 2003: Grande Ourse : Colombe
- 2002: Asbestos : Madeleine
- 2003: Chartrand et Simonne, la suite : Spanish militant in FRAP.
- 2001: L'Enfant de la télé : Rita
- 1998: Coroner Premier rôle : Cathia Hunter
- 1997: La Courte Échelle II : Ozzie
- 1997–1999: La Part des anges : Camille Dansereau
- 1994–1996: Les Héritiers Duval : Marie-Andrée Régnier
- 1993: Écoute ton cœur : Pascale
- 1989–1993: Jamais deux sans toi : Marie-Andrée Régnier
- 1991: Livrofolies, Alice au pays des merveilles : Alice
- 1991: Livrofolies, Les Malheurs de Sophie : Sophie
- 1990: Une faim de loup : Marie

=== Theatre ===
- Danse, petites désobéissances : Ève

== Awards and nominations ==
Year	Organisation	Award	Work	Result
2011	Jutra Awards	Best Actress (Meilleure Actrice)	Incendies	Nominated
2011	Vancouver Film Critics Circle	Best Supporting Actress in a Canadian Film	Incendies	Nominated
2014	Jutra Awards	Best Supporting Actress (Meilleure Actrice de Soutien)	Gabrielle	Won
