= Sébastien Huberdeau =

Canadian actor (born 1979)

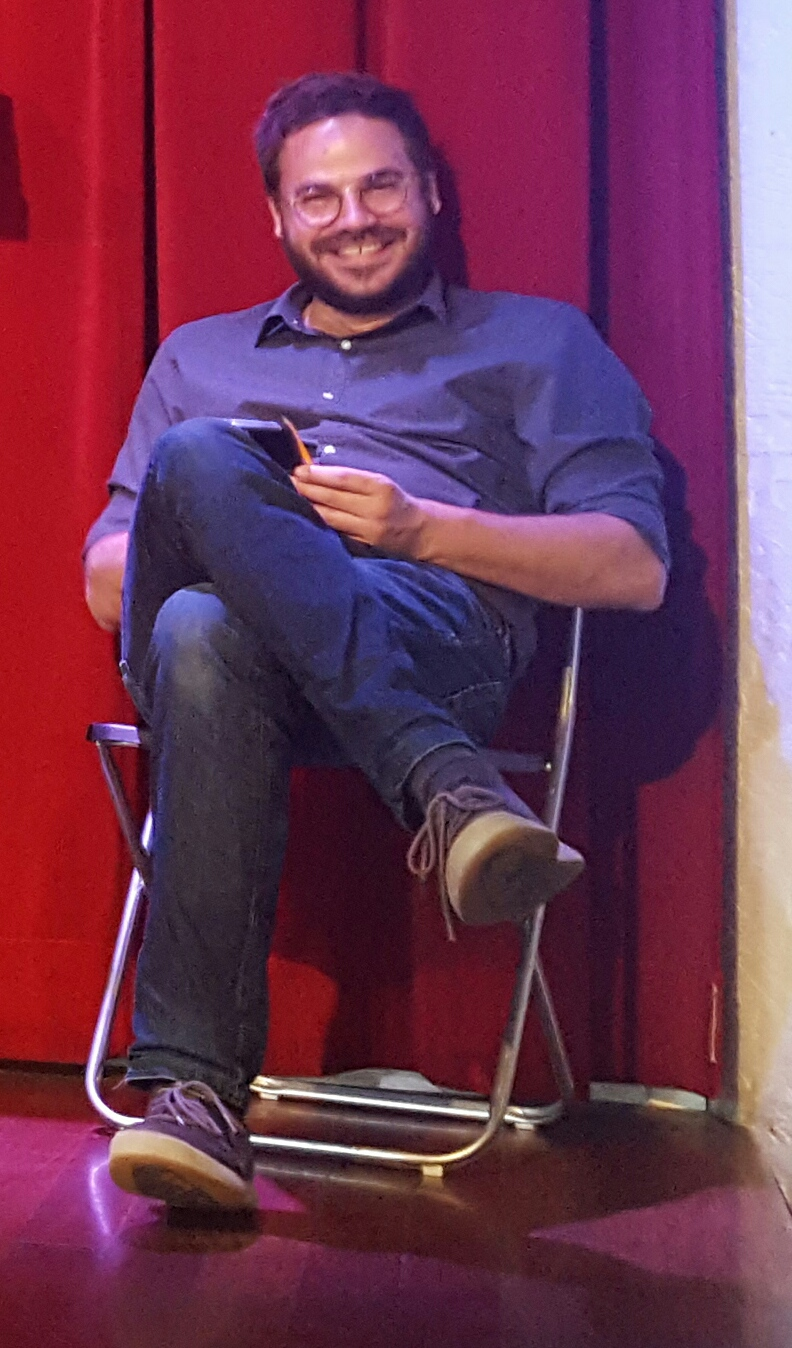
Sébastien Huberdeau (2017)

Sébastien Huberdeau (born 30 November 1978) is a Canadian actor. He studied political science at university. He has played in a rendition of the play Talk Radio and was seen on screens abroad in The Barbarian Invasions (Les Invasions barbares), winner of the 2004 Academy Award for Best Foreign Language Film. Huberdeau was nominated in 2000 for a Jutra Award for his role in Sable Island (L'Île de sable). He is known to enjoy parachuting and fencing.

== Filmography ==
=== Movies ===
- Sable Island (L'Île de sable), 1999
- Memories Unlocked (Souvenirs intimes), 1999
- Yellowknife, 2002
- The Barbarian Invasions (Les Invasions barbares), 2003
- The Last Tunnel (Le Dernier tunnel), 2004
- Battle of the Brave (Nouvelle-France), 2004
- Family History (Histoire de famille), 2006
- The Beautiful Beast (La Belle bête), 2006
- Polytechnique, 2009
- Thelma, Louise et Chantal, 2010
- Silence Lies (Tromper le silence), 2010
- The Hair of the Beast (Le Poil de la bête), 2010
- Angle mort, 2011
- Iqaluit, 2016

=== Television ===
- Classé secret (2023)
- La Job (2006)
- Les Hauts et les bas de Sophie Paquin (2006)
- Virginie (2005)
- Un monde à part (2004)
- Dangerous Liaisons (2003) (Les Liaisons dangereuses)
- Willie (2000)
- Le Monde de Charlotte (2000)
- Gypsies (2000)
- Tag (2000)

== See also ==
- List of Quebec actors
- Cinema of Quebec
- Television of Quebec
- Culture of Quebec
