= Classé secret =

Canadian television series

- French: Classé secret
- Genre: Spy thriller; crime drama
- Written by: Michel D'Astous, François Pagé
- Directed by: Stéphan Beaudoin
- Starring: Mélissa Désormeaux-Poulin; Patrick Labbé; Andreas Apergis; Paul Ahmarani; Gabriel Arcand
- Country of origin: Canada
- Original languages: French; English
- No. of seasons: 2
- No. of episodes: 20

Production
- Producers: Stéphane Jacques; Anne Boyer; Michel d'Astous; Marie-Ève Bergeron; Carole Mondello
- Running time: 40–45 mins. (per episode)
- Production companies: Groupe TVA; Quebecor Content

Original release
- Network: Addik
- Release: March 31, 2022 – December 20, 2023

Classé secret (English: Classified Secret) is a French Canadian TV spy thriller, crime drama series, which was broadcast on Addik from March 31, 2022. The first season of ten episodes was directed by Stéphan Beaudoin and co-written by Michel D'Astous and François Pagé. Filming occurred during late 2021 for Groupe TVA and Quebecor Content. The first season was produced by Duo Productions in collaboration with Quebecor Content. The two lead protagonists are the married secret service agents Rachel (Mélissa Désormeaux-Poulin) and Émile (Patrick Labbé) who investigate a fatal shooting near Montreal's American Consulate and an associated assassination attempt. Meanwhile, their fictitious agency, Secret Services of Canada (SSC), has a high-placed CIA mole. SSC boss Adrien (Andreas Apergis) suspects Rachel and orders Émile to investigate. Désormeaux-Poulin has said that the script reminded her of Kill Bill and that she had long wanted to play a spy.

A second season, also of ten episodes, was confirmed in September 2022, and is set 18 months after the end of season one with Beaudoin returning as director and Pagé as sole scriptwriter. Filming of episodes finished in April 2023, while broadcasting began on October 11 of that year. In this season, Rachel heads SSC after Émile was exposed as the CIA mole and supposedly executed. Adrien is a security consultant for a mining company which has two workers held hostage in a disputed area of the Maghreb in Africa. Both seasons were streamed in Australia on SBS On Demand as Classified from February 1, 2024.

== Premise ==
Rachel and Émile are married Canadian secret agents. Their boss, Adrien directs Rachel to investigate people shot dead near Montreal's American consulate. The sniper spared Shammar dissident, Yasser. Rachel has agents Irène and Martin surveil Yasser. Adrien appoints Émile to hunt their CIA mole; Adrien suggests it is Rachel. Counter-Terrorism leader, Jacques discovers Rachel contacted CIA agent, Max. Rachel and Émile instruct Irène to subvert Yasser. Émile believes Rachel was framed. Émile's team abducts Yasser. Jacques discovers Rachel's agreement with CIA. Émile drives Rachel to his assistant, Bob, who takes her to the border. Émile tells their daughters that Rachel went on a business trip. CIA interrogator, Amanda tests Rachel for any vulnerability. Jacques suspends Émile for aiding Rachel. Rachel wears biometric bodysuit while Amanda continues assessing. Canadian National Security Adviser, Monique orders Rachel's assassination. Vancouver agent, VJ takes over Rachel's duties. Émile informs Adrien to extract Rachel. Monique orders Jacques to lure Rachel to return. Jacques authorises poisoning of their daughter, Marine. Rachel leaves Canada, phones Émile: her uncle Philip was the previous CIA mole. Rachel learns that Émile is the current CIA mole. Adrien orders agent Valérie to remove Émile. Émile is supposedly killed in a training accident.

== Cast and characters ==
- Mélissa Désormeaux-Poulin as Rachel Miller: Montreal-based, Secret Services of Canada (SSC) Head of Counter-Terrorism, married to Émile, mother of their two daughters
  - Takes over Adrien's job, hunts for Debussy mercenary group members, including Robin
- Patrick Labbé as Émile Darcy: SSC informant's manager, married to Rachel; supposedly killed in a training exercise after being exposed as CIA's mole
- Paul Ahmarani as Jacques Thomassin: SSC Head of Counter-Espionage, Rachel's rival for Adrien's job
- Madeleine Péloquin as Valérie Kasher/Cachère née Dominique Addison: SSC "house-keeping" agent, chosen by Rachel to assist Émile's household while Rachel was in US
  - Leads active missions for Rachel, including search for Robin, killed by Rachel to save Azure
- Andreas Apergis as Adrien McKenna: SSC managing director, Rachel's boss, considering retirement
  - Works as security consultant for company Pentecôte Mining, re-installed to SSC
- Gabriel Arcand as Philip Miller: Rachel's uncle, former SSC boss, mentored Adrien
  - Resumes sexual liaison with Amanda
- Leïla Thibeault-Louchem as Irène Beauvais: SSC agent, works for Émile
  - Federal prisoner for killing Jamel, clandestinely freed by Rachel to look for Robin, Valérie's love interest
- Mali Corbeil-Gauvreau as Marine Miller-Darcy: Rachel and Émile's asthmatic 8-year-old daughter
  - Ten-year-old, cherishes pet dog
- Charlotte Bégin as Azure Miller-Darcy: Rachel and Émile's 11-year-old daughter
  - Thirteen-year-old, dyslexic
- Geneviève Boivin-Roussy as Anne Miller: Philip's daughter, Rachel's cousin, civilian translator
  - Starts dating Théo, killed by Robin
- Sofia Blondin as Sarah Adamson: Rachel's SSC assistant, Bob's wife; systems analyst
  - Bob's widow, works for Jacques, poses as Jessica Boudreau: Foreign Affairs' consular official
- Susie Almgren as L'Interrogatrice (English: "The Interrogator")/Amanda Haspel: CIA handler, interrogates Rachel in Vermont
  - (as Amanda): CIA head in Montreal, hires Robin targeting Rachel, killed by Rachel
- Lee Villeneuve as Marcel Desjardins: Rachel's chauffeur-bodyguard, killed by explosion

=== Season one only ===
- Karim Babin as Yasser Chadli: Shammar (fictitious Persian Gulf emirate) émigré, political dissident, bookseller
- Bobby Beshro as Robert "Bob" Galois: SSC agent, works for Émile; killed by Émile
- Rose-Maïté Erkoreka as Monique Bartoli: Prime Minister (PM)'s National Security Adviser, takes over Adrien's job, clandestinely paid by Shammar government
- Catherine Renaud as Marianne Forestier: bookseller, Yasser's wife
- Gabriel Lemire as Martin Goyer: Royal Canadian Mounted Police (RCMP) transferee to Émile's team, killed by Jamel's agents
- Cynthia Wu-Maheux as Mégane: Irène's domestic partner, mother of Colin
- Nikola Masri as Bilal Chadli: Yasser's son, proposes violent anti-Shammar action, actually Bruno's informant
- Richard Des Lys as Jamel Al-Nazef: Shammar spy working for their version of Saudi Arabian secret police (Mabahith), poses as Shammar cultural attaché, attempts to eliminate Canadian-based Shammar dissidents, employs Omar, plans Emir's murder to instigate military coup in Shammar, killed by Irène
- Hubert Proulx as Bruno Garand: RCMP inspector, instals Martin as SSC insider
- Julie Trépanier as Liz Olson: ostensibly Émile's physiotherapist, actually his CIA handler, returns to US
- Rania Assad Lahlou as Inaya Chadli: Yasser and Marianne's daughter
- Shadi Janho as Omar Bin Aziz: Shammar ex-military mercenary, sniper-assassin; hired by Jamel for Yasser case, killed by Mégane
- Bruno Verdoni as Max O'Leary: former CIA agent, begins process of subverting Rachel, killed by Liz
- Said Benyoucef as Khaled Bin Sadria: Shammar official, cultural attaché, brokers deal to eliminate émigré dissidents
- Catherine Beauchemin as Victoria John "VJ" Logan: Vancouver-based SSC agent hired by Philip; becomes Montreal's Head of Counter-Terrorism (Rachel's former job)

=== Season two only ===
- Laurent Lucas as Robin Denard: Djibouti-born French citizen, former French Foreign Legion and Directorate-General for External Security (DGSE), Debussy group (fictitious mercenary/terrorist organisation) captain, assassin, posing as security consultant, relocated to Montreal, killed by Esteban
- France Castel as Margaret "Maggie" Darcy: Émile's estranged mother, Rachel's mother-in-law, minds granddaughters, alcoholic
- Louis-Philippe Dandenault as Maxime Boulanger: Rachel's SSC assistant
- Sébastien Huberdeau as Fabien Duvernay: Azure's teacher, concerned by her misbehavior
- Maxime de Cotret as Arnaud Cowan: Pentecôte Mining mineralogist, stationed in Ghanim (fictitious location near borders of Algeria, Tunisia and Libya), Maghreb, discovers valuable information
- Ted Pluviose as Pierre Malherbe: Hervé's partner, has heart condition requiring medication, Arnaud's co-worker, also in Ghanim
- Carla Turcotte as Carole Larose: Arnaud's partner, Toronto resident
- Frederick Bouffard as Hervé Tremblay: Pierre's partner, Carole's friend
- Julian Bailey as Lieutenant William "Billy" Devlin: Debussy group mercenary, main guard-torturer holding hostages, agent for Adrien
- Benoit Drouin-Germain as Théo Dumont: economics journalist, dating Anne
- Luis Oliva as Esteban Cardenas: Mexican drug cartel boss, originally working with Robin
- Dominick Rustam as Auguste Kleu: Jacques' domestic partner
- Elizabeth Duperré as Kelly Rouleau: SSC analyst, works for Jacques
- Igor Ovadis as Oncle (English: Uncle) Sergeï Bezmanoff: Head of Russian Secret Service in Montreal
- Jean-René Moissan as Chef de pupitre (English: Desk Manager): Théo's editor
- Sarah Cavalli Pernod as Marie-Rose Trintignant: associate of Robin
- Thierry Bellevue as Nesly: New Rachel's chauffeur-bodyguard

== Episode guide ==
=== Season one ===
No. overall	No. in season	Title	Directed by	Written by	Original release date
1	1	"Code Zulu" (Code Zoulou)	Stéphan Beaudoin	Michel D'Astous, François Pagé	March 31, 2022
Caucasus Region: Émile and three agents kill guards, rescue Rachel. She's was tortured. Rescue team sent by Philip. 13 years later: Rachel and Émile reject Azure's request for tattoo. Rachel's called to work. Yasser, Marianne enter bookshop. Yasser receives death threat, leaves for consulate. Joseph tails CIA agent wearing handcuffed briefcase. Yasser now walks amid them. Omar kills CIA agent, another woman, Joseph, another man; spares Yasser. Omar leaves rooftop. At SSC, Rachel praises Sarah. Jacques informs Rachel of shooting. Rachel orders team into action. Bob recognises Joseph. CIA agent's case contains encrypted USBs. Rachel and Jacques update Adrien. Jacques: Joseph not officially present. Yasser tells Marianne he was target. Rachel and Adrien view CCTV: Omar spares Yasser. Rachel and Émile discuss Yasser's profile. Bruno queries why death toll's three not four. Émile refuses to answer. Irène, Martin surveil Yasser. Bilal and Anaya rail against parental restrictions. Rachel informs Émile of Shammar Emir's impending arrival. Jacques shows SSC's stolen USBs to Adrien: CIA mole at SSC. Adrien updates Monique but overrides informing PM. Adrien transfers Yasser case to Rachel. Yasser receives message: trust no one. Adrien asks Émile to hunt mole: probably Rachel. Max swaps briefcase with Rachel.
2	2	"On the Rink" (Sur la glace)	Stéphan Beaudoin	Michel D'Astous, François Pagé	April 7, 2022
Rachel still has nightmares of being tortured. Irène and Mégane discuss domestic situation. Jacques confirms suspicions about Rachel to Émile: Rachel contacted Max. Agents plant bugs in Rachel's home. Irène bugs Marianne's computer. Philip shares meal with Rachel's family; attempts to manipulate Rachel. Émile asks Rachel to seek professional help for nightmares. Émile tells off Jacques for planted devices. Jamel gives Omar next target: Yasser's friend. Rachel assures Bruno: will be kept informed. Émile sets Bob to tail Max. Masked men abduct Yasser's friend. Rachel and Émile instruct Irène to subvert Yasser. Video shows Yasser's friend denouncing anti-Shammars. Martin updates Bruno about Yasser. Bob orders Martin to bug Chadli residence; finds already existing bugs. Bilal warns Anaya: be careful. Anne dines with Rachel's family. Philip asks Adrien to reject Rachel's candidacy for Adrien's job. Bilal insults Yasser. Rachel asks Anne to look after her family should anything happen to her. Adrien informs Monique of current status. Bob observes Rachel and Max swapping information. Omar photographs Bilal and Anaya. Bob reports to Jacques. Émile finds Rachel's safe with passports, disguises, money, gun. Rachel hands meeting transcripts to Max; he provides exit protocols. Omar sees Irène set afire by motorcyclist outside bookshop.
3	3	"Frienemies" (Aminnemis)	Stéphan Beaudoin	Michel D'Astous, François Pagé	April 14, 2022
Yasser and Marianne rescue Irène. Bob refuses further helping Jacques. Irène ingratiates herself with Chadlis. Omar sees Martin (motorcyclist), Irène chatting. Philip asks Anne whether Rachel's stable. Rachel, Émile and Bob attend Joseph's funeral. Rachel declines Monique's request for additional information. Émile treated by Liz. Rachel asks Sarah to identify CIA visitors meeting Adrien. Bob tells Irène about Martin contacting Bruno. Omar reports SSC activity with Chadlis to Jamel. Jacques convinced that mole's Rachel, Émile believes Rachel's framed, Adrien continues investigation. Philip hires VJ. CIA agent asks for Yasser. CIA Woman1 hands Rachel USB. Bob briefs Émile about Jamel's activities. Bruno orders Martin to delay Yasser's recruitment by SSC. Marine has asthma attack. Azure asks Émile to intervene with school bullies. Rachel checks CIA service agreement from USB using her laptop. Marianne describes Yasser's life to Irène. Yasser's abducted by Émile's team. Émile coerces Yasser to be his informant. Irène becomes Yasser's handler. Émile tells Philip about Rachel being framed; Émile suspects Jacques and Adrien. Rachel and Max meet. Jacques provides Rachel's defection evidence. Max is killed. Jacques organises Rachel's abduction. Adrien informs Monique. Rachel and Émile plan children's activities. Rachel has nightmare. Bob and Émile observe Max' corpse.
4	4	"Bonds" (Complicités)	Stéphan Beaudoin	Michel D'Astous, François Pagé	April 21, 2022
Adrien orders team to monitor CIA responses to Max' murder. Yasser tells Irène no terrorist action by anti-Shammar community. Rachel and Marcel note various agents tail them. Jacques fobs off Philip's concerns for Rachel. Upon learning of Martin reporting to Bruno, Émile bullies Martin into fooling Bruno. Yasser details his informant status to family – Omar listens. Jacques fires Bob. Philip alerts Rachel of Jacques' Vancouver agents. Jamel gives Omar new targets; profile Irène. Rachel informs Émile of Valérie's assignment to household. Bob explains Jacques' situation. Yasser explains to his children. Émile and Bruno are fractious. Sarah informs Rachel that Jacques told agents to collect Rachel. At restaurant, Rachel swaps clothes with Anne. Jacques sees Philip with Rachel's children – abduction foiled. Jacques orders immediate arrest of Rachel and Émile. Émile drives Rachel to Bob. Rachel promises to return. Khaled, with Monique's approval, asks Adrien to ignore dissidents being killed or abducted. Bob drops Rachel near American border; he waits in car. Jacques' team discover Bob shot dead. Yasser's father arrested in Shammar. Irène promises to protect Yasser. Jacques threatens to harm Émile's daughters. Émile attacks Jacques' team; Adrien intervenes. Rachel picked up by CIA; she's tied, hooded.
5	5	"Loyalties" (Loyautés)	Stéphan Beaudoin	Michel D'Astous, François Pagé	April 28, 2022
Adrien berates Jacques for using Émile's daughters; orders Émile home. Adrien applauds Jacques destabilising Émile. Interrogator takes Rachel to Vermont chalet. Émile reads Rachel's letter, tells daughters Rachel's on business trip. Valérie presents passwords to Émile. Émile reports to Adrien: six dissidents died in Canada, this week. Adrien: Khaled presumed Adrien's compliance. Marine's frightened by Valérie; Azure accepts situation. Émile informs Sarah of Bob's death. Jamel offers Bilal return to Shammar. Philip's dismissive of Jacques. Philip asks Adrien who benefits from Rachel's absence? Interrogator checks Rachel's vulnerabilities. Mégane worried by Irène missing Colin's birthday. Khaled hands Bruno: Yasser's deportation request. Émile directs Martin: update Irène. Omar observes Martin meeting Irène. Jacques suspends Émile. Rachel wears biometric bodysuit, Interrogator observes Rachel's scarring. Irène scolds Mégane for contacting Émile. Monique supports Rachel's extraction of Rachel. Émile orders Jamel to cease operations, leave Canada. Interrogator questions Rachel. Valérie prevents Anne's entry. Anne complains to Philip but Émile supports Irène's actions. Anne overhears that Rachel's liable to be killed by SSC. Irène warns Omar to stop following her or Chadlis. Khaled tells Yasser he's being deported. Liz tends to Émile. Jacques' extraction team lured into trap, all killed. Rachel strangling Interrogator but pushed off.
6	6	"Extreme Prejudice" (Préjudice extrême)	Stéphan Beaudoin	Michel D'Astous, François Pagé	May 5, 2022
Rachel's strapped to bed. Jacques tells Monique that failed extraction's no longer registered. Monique orders Rachel's assassination. Khaled ignores Chadlis' pleas, threatens them if they persist. Émile cautions Irène that SSC has leak. Interrogator informs Rachel of extraction attempt. Sarah begs Émile for answers about Bob's death, Rachel's disappearance; but he explains little. Rachel tells Interrogator she joined CIA because they helped free her in Caucasus. Jacques tells Anne of Rachel's assassination order. Chadlis argue with each other. Émile's team discuss Yasser. Jacques suspends Émile. VJ receives conflicting orders from Adrien and Monique. Jamel grooms Bilal for terrorism. VJ takes over Rachel and Émile's duties. VJ brings Marianne to Yasser. Yasser tells Mariann about Irène being SSC spy. VJ orders Irène to question Chadlis harder. Interrogator confirmed Rachel's information; arranges video call with Émile. Jamel brings Bilal to truck mechanics where Omar installs bombs. Monique replaces Adrien. Philip, Adrien tell Anne that Rachel will be lured back to Canada and assassinated. Adrien asks Émile if he's in contact with Rachel. Émile and daughters call Rachel, who learns of assassination order. Rachel gives Émile coded instructions, which he decodes. Interrogator believes Rachel's information's reliable. Jamel orders Omar to grab Irène.
7	7	"Mirror Games" (Jeux de miroirs)	Stéphan Beaudoin	Michel D'Astous, François Pagé	May 12, 2022
Bruno's redirected; takes Yasser to VJ. Yasser tells VJ: no explosives for his group. Surveillance lose Émile. VJ advises Monique that Yasser case has many anomalies. Monique orders VJ: Yasser back to Shammar. Rachel asks Interrogator for access to files to research previous disinformation. VJ tells team to misdirect Monique: move Chadlis to secret location. Irène explains situation to Marianne. Émile informs Adrien: extract Rachel. Monique tells Jacques: lure Rachel. Irène removes USB. Jamel orders Bilal: find Yasser's location. Émile updates Liz. VJ warns Omar to leave within 24 hours or media will expose his activities. Philip figures Adrien had Rachel "defect" to CIA. Rachel tracks anomalous Canadian files. Adrien gives Valérie new mission. Irène prepares to move Chadlis. VJ tells Irène to ignore Monique's orders. Transfer vehicle attacked: Martin and driver killed, Yasser gone. Omar threatens Mégane so Irène gives herself up. Rachel finds suspicious documents amid files. Adrien orders VJ: keep Monique in the dark. Sniper messages Rachel: extraction tomorrow. Mégane prepares Colin's bottle; throws boiled water at Omar, kills him. Rachel's finds code names used by CIA moles. Émile confirms code name for her Caucasus rescue. Jamel tortures Irène, blinds one eye; Bilal watches.
8	8	"Triple Agent" (Agent triple)	Stéphan Beaudoin	Michel D'Astous, François Pagé	May 19, 2022
Yasser hiding in building; phones Bilal. VJ stands guard as Émile enters mechanic's workshop; shots fired. Man switches Marine's inhaler. Flashback, Caucasus: Rachel's taken hostage at roadblock. Present: Rachel believes Philip betrayed her. VJ tells Bruno workshop's dead bodies are gangland killings. VJ: bomb truck assembled, here. Bilal betrays Yasser to Jamel. Marine uses inhaler. Adrien asks Philip for unlisted safehouse. Jamel plans for Yasser to bomb Emir. VJ updates Monique about Yasser. Anne gives unused apartment's keys to Philip. Bilal tells Yasser he's protecting his mother and sister. Yasser provokes Jamel: gets killed. Philip asks Jacques to delay enacting assassination order. Jacques ordered inhaler poisoning. Bruno reveals Yasser's death to Émile, VJ. Valérie organises snipers around Rachel's chalet. Adrien accuses Monique of conspiring with Shammar. Snipers scan chalet; Rachel uses mirror glass as knife. Émile visits Irène in hospital; takes daughters. Marine collapses. Valérie disables chalet's defenses, Rachel moves from room to room, lures guards to where they are shot. Valérie tasers Interrogator but left alive. Rachel leaves chalet. Flashback: Adrien and Rachel plan her defection. Present: Rachel returns to Canada. Anne arrives at hospital. Rachel phones Émile: Philip's the mole. Émile does not mention Marine hospitalized.
9	9	"Convictions" (Convictions)	Stéphan Beaudoin	Michel D'Astous, François Pagé	May 22, 2022
Émile reunited with Rachel. Adrien to Valérie: Jacques poisoned Marine to lure Rachel. Adrien sets up conference call between PM and Attorney General (AG). Khaled updates Jamel on Emir's itinerary. Valérie goes to safehouse, disables Philip. Rachel and Émile visit Anne and daughters in hospital. Jacques and team arrive to arrest Rachel. VJ has Rachel's exoneration from AG. VJ: Adrien wants to see Rachel. Rachel updates VJ, Jacques and Adrien on CIA's files. Mégane cannot prevent Irène leaving hospital. Rachel interviews Philip, who's injected with "truth serum". Philip admits to exchanging information with CIA, arranging Rachel's 2008 capture, does not know current mole. Adrien convinces Monique to pretend she knew Rachel's innocence. Marianne and Inaya view Yasser's corpse. After Jacques anonymously reveals poison, Marine starts recovery. Rachel appoints Sarah to hunt mole: probably Bob's murderer. Liz orders Émile to leave for America but he refuses. Bilal condemns Emir in video. Marianne rejects Irène's apology. Sarah discovers Liz is Émile's CIA handler. Rachel orders Jacques to gather evidence on Émile, while Sarah tracks Liz' movements. Liz gloats about seducing and subverting Émile; she directed him to rescue Rachel. AG revoked Liz' diplomatic immunity due to Max' murder. Émile receives message to run.
10	10	"Very Classified" (Classé Très Secret)	Stéphan Beaudoin	Michel D'Astous, François Pagé	June 2, 2022
Rachel updates Adrien: no sign of Jamel or Émile. CIA abandons Émile in exchange for Olsons deportation. Jamel instructs Bilal on car bomb's operation. Marine leaves hospital, Rachel stays home. Rachel rebuffs Philip, reveals his confessions. Adrien and Monique threaten each other. Émile kills two CIA mercenaries. Bilal sits in car; Jamel waits nearby, target vehicle approaches. Bruno orders Bilal: remain calm. VJ holds Jamel at gunpoint, offers to hire him. Irène kills Jamel. Monique's paid by Khaled; Adrien orders her capture. Irène imprisoned, visited by Mégane. Valerie finds illegal immigrants killed by CIA. Adrien suspected Émile, sent Rachel with fake documents to cast doubt on information. Bilal returns to family. Rachel informs Adrien of planned meeting with Émile. Émile and Rachel discuss their lives. He was subverted before he rescued Rachel. He continued because CIA threatened her and their daughters. Émile claims to have killed Bob to prevent Jacques finding out. Rachel points gun at Émile but cannot fire. Rachel and Marcel leave. Valerie arrives points gun at Émile. Rachel hears gunshot. Rachel tells daughters that Émile's dead. Anne arrives to comfort Rachel. Rachel promoted to Adrien's job. Interrogator observes Rachel and daughters visiting Émile's grave.

=== Season two ===
No. overall	No. in season	Title	Directed by	Written by	Original release date
11	1	"Zero Value" (Valeur nulle)	Stéphan Beaudoin	François Pagé	October 18, 2023
Flashback: Rachel attends Ottawa security council; requests directive to capture Robin. Chairman indecisive, Valérie-led mission stood down. Present: Rachel: that was my first mistake. Flashback: Marine writes "Papa" repeatedly. Valérie relives shooting at Émile. Man photographs Azure entering home. Montreal: Maxime: Mahgreb activity escalating. Rachel: extract our agents. Rachel and Maggie discuss mourning Émile. Ghanim: Pierre lets Arnaud in building. Arnaud tries messaging Toronto but Internet's down. Jacques to Rachel: must replace VJ. Maxime: Ghanim communications disabled. Arnaud, Pierre in desert, briefly contact Carole, Hervé. Arnaud, Pierre continue driving. Sarah's "Source": Robin's still in Montreal. Anne visits Rachel and family. Maggie scoffs at official description of Émile's death: stray bullet during training. Arnaud, Pierre stopped by Debussy guards. Rachel, Anne, Marine skating. Billy knocks out hostages. Jacques, Auguste share meal. Maxime to Rachel: Arnaud, Pierre missing. Billy enters holding cell where Arnaud, Pierre are hanging; starts torture. "Source" messages Sarah. Rachel limits Azure's contact with Philip. Sarah finds "Source" dead. Jacques arrives, collects evidence, tells Sarah: no police report. Rachel's late for parent-teacher interview with Fabien. Sarah learns Robin targeted Azure. Valérie's squad enters, guns drawn. Jacques secured Rachel's daughters, Maggie. Robin phones Rachel: knows her daughters' location.
12	2	"Voice Match" (Match Vocal)	Stéphan Beaudoin	François Pagé	October 25, 2023
Ontario prison: Rachel to Irène: I will divert you out of prison. Mégane, Colin left Montreal for Gaspesia. Arnaud, Pierre unhooded, chained together. Adrien to Rachel: ransom demanded. Maggie dissatisfied with Valérie: not intimidating as bodyguard. Rachel appoints Irène to search for Robin. Irène advises Sarah to widen parameters; consider criminal networks and ex-Legionnaires. Two local policemen confront Robin; he kills both. Fabien returns Rachel's scarf, they finish discussing Azure's schooling. Jacques asks Philip about Robin. Fabien advises Rachel that Azure hacked exam questions for other students faces disciplinary hearing, possible expulsion. Adrien informs Carole, Hervé: their partners are hostages. He cautions them to remain calm. Billy tortures Pierre, asks what they found. Maggie queries granddaughters about Émile's death. Azure: why Maggie they did not see them for seven years. Anne's dating Theo. Present: Rachel describes three seemingly unrelated situations: hostages, Robin, Maggie. Flashback: Rachel reads Fabien's profile. During phone conversation: Robin provides geolocation, mentions Pentecôte, Grizelda's (Montreal bar). Arnaud asks Pierre to hold himself together. Valérie to Rachel: denies killing Émile. Billy takes Pierre out of cell. Valérie waits at Griselda's, sees Legionnaire. Present: Adrien was manipulating. Flashback: After Valérie wins fight against Legionnaire, Robin arrives and captures her.
13	3	"Variable Geometry Interests" (Intérêts à géométrie variable)	Stéphan Beaudoin	François Pagé	November 1, 2023
Injured Valérie thrown out of van; doctor treats wounds. Valerie recalls Robin providing Rachel's second warning; next is someone in pieces. Philip phones Roland in Paris: asks about Robin. Theo shows Anne around workplace. Sarah (as Jessica) meets Hervé, Carole; they view kidnappers' video. Billy mocks Arnaud, requests mineral locations. 2016: Rachel, Valérie hire Robin to kill traitor. Flashback: Sarah reports to Irène: met hostages' partners. Irène: Geolocation seems empty. Philip to Jacques: Ghanim has uranium. Jacques explains to Rachel, Maxime: France wants uranium, hires Debussy to capture hostages, asks SSC to neutralize Robin. Billy enters Pierre's cell with chair, rope. Irène notices snowed over car near geolocation. Rachel tells Sergeï: CIA head in exchange for information about Robin. Azure asks Rachel to charm Fabien. Marine's worried about forgetting Émile. Irène copies car's USB. Rachel, Adrien meet; no longer trust each other. Azure tells Maggie: Émile killed because of his mistake. Rachel, Fabien lunch together. Rachel queries team: why Ottawa head office have no strategies for hostages. Rachel requests meeting with CIA. Adrien tells Carole, Hervé that Pentecôte's insurance lapsed but he's organizing other funding. Sarah enters. Maggie threatens Rachel to reveal how Émile was killed. Arnaud sees Pierre hanging.
14	4	"Ockham's Razor" (Le rasoir d'Ockham)	Stéphan Beaudoin	François Pagé	November 8, 2023
Anne and Théo have sex. Robin shoots Anne after walking past her with Théo. Rachel, Valérie, Marcel observe murder scene. Sarah reports to Irène that Adrien recognised her when visiting Carole's home. Sarah gives traceable, listening phone to Hervé. Jacques and Maxime discuss whether target was Théo or Anne. Rachel tells Philip: Anne's been shot dead. Billy and team return Arnaud to his office; collect his map of coded locations. Adrien negotiates ransom with Debussy group. They provide video, which shows Pierre hanging. Rachel tells Maxime to apply Occam's razor: Adrien's hiding something, therefore use steganographically to analyse video. Rachel meets Amanda, who claims Anne was Robin's sole target. Present: Killing Anne made no sense. Flashback: Rachel demands Jacques capture Robin. Adrien shows Pierre's hanging to Carole. Rachel informs daughters and Maggie of Anne dying. Robin and Billy update each other. Rachel warns Maggie to stop drinking, which led to Émile banishing her when she endangered their children. Philip meets Théo. Kelly shows Maxime: Arnaud's map embedded on Pierre's video. Philip holds Théo at gunpoint, demands answers. Valérie enters one of Robin's hideouts, finds various booby-traps. Rachel sees woman's photo on fridge. She demands team finds Robin by day's end.
15	5	"Pamir" (Pamir)	Stéphan Beaudoin	François Pagé	November 15, 2023
Rachel tells daughters, Maggie that Anne was shot. Partial photo shows woman and man's arm with tattoo of Pamir. Robin had a 2009 mission there. When Sarah stops listening to Hervé, Carole; Carole mentions Arnaud's map. Maxime now remembers having seen Rachel and Robin in Pamir back in 2009. Car tries hitting Irène but she escapes. Philip asks Adrien to avenge Anne's death. Théo searches Internet for Rachel. Philip had threatened Théo. Rachel tells Jacques she does not remember Robin at Pamir. Rachel notices that Azure had shot Rachel's gun after taking it from the gun safe. Pierre returned alive to Arnaud: hanging was faked. Adrien continues negotiating; he tells Carole, Hervé that Pierre's alive. Maxime: cartels likely transfer drugs, labelled as uranium, through Ghanim into Europe. Irène asks Adrien whether he's negotiating for the map or hostages. Amanda provides Robin's files; his associates include woman photographed as Marie-Rose. Amanda: Robin's killing people around Rachel before he kills you. Maggie displays Émile's army medals to granddaughters. Rachel, Fabien dine. Irène, Valérie chat. Amanda meets Philip. Two men trail Jacques; he phones Valérie before he gets bashed. Rachel, Marcel respond to Jacques' missing. Robin bashes Jacques, gunman threatens Auguste, Jacques hears gunshot.
16	6	"Proof of Life" (Preuve de vie)	Stéphan Beaudoin	François Pagé	November 22, 2023
Valérie saved Auguste, killed mercenary. Jacques breaks out of restraints, attacks Robin. They struggle over gun. Robin to Jacques: no forgiveness for Rachel. Jacques wants answers from Rachel. Robin escapes as Maxime approaches. Billy tortures Arnaud, Pierre. Marie-Rose spotted. Jacques returns to Auguste, Valérie leaves. Rachel monitors Maggie's worsening drinking. Adrien warns Amanda off Philip. Théo does not cooperate with Philip. Maxime plans operation to extract hostages. Rachel previously used Robin to kill Canadian terrorists. After government policy changed, minister ordered Robin's death, but attempt failed. Philip to Rachel: her father was an agent. Irène, Valérie question informant about Mexican cartel's operations. Rachel, Fabien consider dating. Robin and Esteban negotiate drug transport deal. Irène scolds Sarah over lapse in checking recordings: she missed map discussion. Adrien asks Rachel for favors: no rescue attempt, forgive Philip. Rachel develops concept map linking elements of her investigations. Théo asks his editor to approve investigation into Rachel. Carole, Hervé introduce Sarah to actual Jessica. Rachel and Fabien have sex. Maggie asks Philip about Émile. Jacques sends Maxime after Marie-Rose. Rachel's called in. Robin arrives to meeting location. Maxime's team surround venue but Rachel realises its a trap, calls off team. Explosion disrupts cameras.
17	7	"Left of Boom" (À gauche du boum)	Stéphan Beaudoin	François Pagé	November 29, 2023
Several team members, including Marcel, were killed. Maxime survived. Present: Rachel was fooled by Robin's deceptions. Flashback: Valérie, Rachel's daughters evacuate to Valérie's flat. Sarah describes Jessica to Irène, who realises someone's organised them to fail. Philip manipulates Maggie to confront Rachel. Jacques informs Rachel, Maxime of casualties. Valérie, daughters now in hotel. Fabien arrives with password. Rachel tells Maggie that Émile was a traitor but someone else decided to kill him. Rachel orders Maggie to pack her bags. Valérie asks Irène about buyers of captagon. Rachel to Irène: Adrien responsible for Sarah's exposure. Man enters cell, unlocks Pierre, Arnaud; leads them to car boot. Irène learns shipment of captagon, weapons delivered tonight at Grizelda's. Billy welcomes hostages to new location. Rachel meets Hervé, Carole; convinces them their government planned to save hostages but Carole contacted journalist, which resulted in hostages being moved. Rachel accuses Adrien of deliberately stalling hostage rescue for his own agenda. Present: Rachel had become isolated. Flashback: Jacques messages Théo: contact Maggie. Robin's objectives: Adrien, Maxime, Irène, Jacques, Rachel. Adrien, Jacques update each other. Fabien returns daughters to Rachel. Valérie kills six cartel members, working with Robin, at Grizelda's. Théo convinces Maggie to talk.
18	8	"Security Screening" (Filtrage de sécurité)	Stéphan Beaudoin	François Pagé	December 6, 2023
Valérie, Irène have sex. Rachel, daughters discuss her resignation; she does not disclose her breast lump. Maggie spills secrets to Théo, someone's recording them. When Rachel leaves for work, Fabien waits, they kiss. Rachel receives photo of Adrien meeting DGSE director Simone in London. Rachel phones Simone. Hervé, Carole not sure who to trust; Adrien does not reveal who he works for. Nesly's Rachel's new bodyguard. Adrien accesses SSC website. Rachel shows Jacques that Maxime's found that Kelly's cartel contact. Pierre collapses due to lack of heart medication. Rachel, Amanda swap information. Rachel warns Fabien that SSC will delve into his background: he agrees. Robin, Esteban discuss slain cartel members. Esteban wants to ditch Robin, brings in his henchmen. Robin signals, laser sightings shine on Esteban, henchmen. Théo's editor: will check with lawyers before publishing his investigation. Sergeï to Adrien, Philip: Rachel's in danger from Russian mines. Irène directs Sarah to keep contact with Carole, Hervé. Rachel, daughters, Philip attend Anne's funeral. Robin's transported inside truck; he's arming land mines. Philip reveals that Adrien gave kill order for Émile, Robin. Adrien's working for SSC's Ottawa office. Present: Rachel destabilised by learning Valérie killed Émile. Rachel meets Esteban.
19	9	"High-Level Orders" (Directive fonctionnelle)	Stéphan Beaudoin	François Pagé	December 13, 2023
Rachel, Esteban negotiate deal: eliminate Robin. Arnaud explains map to Billy: uranium deposits; drug, weaponry routes; hidden bandit caves. Rachel disarms Valérie, holds guns at her. Rachel no longer trusts Valérie. Valérie relives giving Émile chance to atone, pretends to kill him. Rachel has breast lump. Valérie studies Russian mines. Editor orders Théo: drop story. Théo contacts anarchists. Rachel tells Maggie: Philip used Maggie to punish Rachel. Philip, Amanda have sex. Jacques resists Maxime's desire to arrest Kelly immediately. Rachel asks Adrien about deals with Simone, Esteban. He confirms they relate to Arnaud's map. Rachel to Jacques: know you leaked information to Théo. He sought revenge for Auguste being threatened. Assassin reads Rachel profile. Robin tests mine; Henchman confirms "gift" ready. Rachel, Fabien discuss her resignation. Rachel disables Assassin in elevator with them. Théo hands files to agent posing as anarchist. Maggie accepts delivery of "gift" (booby-trapped chair) for Marine from Phil. Command center trace Kelly's call to Robin's location. Rachel orders strike teams to capture Robin. Jacques arrests Kelly. Marine asks Maggie about "gift"; Maggie says wait for Rachel. Rachel interviews Robin. Robin recalls Émile targeted wrong car: killed Robin's daughter. Legionnaire tackles Azure. Robin threatens Rachel's daughters.
20	10	"Accountability" (Responsabilisation)	Stéphan Beaudoin	François Pagé	December 20, 2023
Valérie to Rachel: Azure's bodyguard not answering; Marine, Maggie at home. Fabien: Legionnaire took Azure. Rachel allows Adrien into observation room; she questions Robin. Rachel orders Adrien: tell Billy to trade Robin for hostages. Rachel has Irène deliver message to Esteban. Legionnaire transports Azure in car boot. Present Rachel realized Adrien works for Ottawa SSC. Flashback: Carole tells Hervé: Adrien not at Pentecôte for weeks. Billy moves hostages. Rachel arrives home to evacuate family. Marine sits on chair: mine set to explode if she gets off. Valérie disables it. Present: Ottawa SSC knew Robin's target was Rachel; did not warn her. Flashback: Rachel, Valérie drive to Azure's location. Valérie holds Henchman: struggling to prevent mines exploding. Rachel kills both Henchman, Valérie to save Azure. Azure, Marine mourn Valérie. Adrien re-installed: Rachel summoned to Ottawa, Irène back to prison. Maxime swaps Robin for hostages. Robin kills Billy but is disarmed. Esteban uses chainsaw, kills Robin. Rachel to Amanda: she will resign; poisons Amanda for hiring Robin. Arnaud, Pierre return to Carole, Hervé. Jacques frees Irène, who gets relocation package from Rachel. Sarah gives Pentecôte file to Théo. Present: Rachel blames SSC's Ottawa leaders for Montreal's mess. Émile greets Rachel.

== Reception ==
Reviewing the first episode, Showbizz.net compared the premise to Mr. & Mrs. Smith, praised Désormeaux-Poulin and Labbé for handling both the physical scenes and the emotional side of their characters and warned that the number of characters and complex situations in the first episode might discourage some viewers.

In May 2022, addikTV announced that the series had set a channel viewing record of more than 415,000 viewers for the episode broadcast on 28 April 2022 (Numeris, francophone Quebec) and that it was first on the specialty entertainment channels chart for 3 January to 24 April 2022. The figures were supplied by the broadcaster.
