= Living on the Edge (film) =

- Theatrical release poster
- French: L'extrême frontière
- Directed by: Rodrigue Jean
- Written by: Rodrigue Jean
- Produced by: Jacques Turgeon; Production Agency: National Film Board of Canada
- Starring: Gérald Leblanc
- Release date: 2005
- Running time: 76 minutes
- Country: Canada
- Language: French

Living on the Edge (full title Living on the Edge, the Poetic Works of Gérald Leblanc also known by its French language title L'extrême frontière, l'oeuvre poétique de Gérald Leblanc) is a 2005 documentary film by Canadian director of Acadian origin Rodrigue Jean. In this documentary, Rodrigue Jean pays tribute to his Acadian roots, focussing on the poetry of Gérald Leblanc.

== Synopsis ==
A child of the Beat Generation, Gérald Leblanc conjoined urban-ness and American-ness, wandering and belonging, far beyond the boundaries of taboo. In so doing, he helped propel Acadia into the modern era.
