= Guilda =

French actor (1924–2012)

Guilda de Mortellaro
- Guida in 1984
- Born: Jean Guida de Mortellaro; June 21, 1924; France
- Died: June 27, 2012 (aged 88); Montreal, Quebec, Canada
- Occupations: cabaret pop singer, actor, chanteuse
- Years active: 1940s–2004

Guilda was the stage name of Jean Guida de Mortellaro (June 21, 1924 – June 27, 2012), a French and Canadian drag queen who built a long and sustained career as a cabaret and variety entertainer.

== Early life ==
Guida claimed to have been the son of an Italian countess whose family surname was de Mortellaro, although journalist Alan Hustak later found that he was unable to verify this as there was no record of the de Mortellaro surname in directories of Italian nobility. Following World War II, he began his career as a female impersonator in Le Carrousel de Paris, taking his stage name from the 1946 Rita Hayworth film Gilda. In 1946, he had a small acting role in Yvan Noé's film Une femme coupée en morceaux.

In 1951, he toured internationally as a stage double for French cabaret performer Mistinguett; discovered by American theatre impresario Lou Walters, he moved to New York City for a time as a headliner of his own show, before moving to Montreal once his American work visa expired.

== Career ==
In Montreal, Guilda became a star performer at the Chez Parée club, becoming renowned for celebrity impersonations of Hayworth, Mistinguett, Marlene Dietrich, Édith Piaf, Barbra Streisand and Marilyn Monroe, and performed regularly on Quebec television variety shows.

In 1965, he performed a sold-out show at Montreal's Salle Wilfrid-Pelletier. In 1967, he opened his own drag cabaret club, Chez Guilda, near the Montreal Forum.

In the 1970s, Guilda had a number of acting roles in the films of Denis Héroux, including The Awakening (L'amour humain), There's Always a Way to Find a Way (Y'a toujours moyen de moyenner!) and Don't Push It (Pousse mais pousse égal). He also launched the theatrical revue Guilda's Follies, blending both musical and sketch comedy performances, in 1975, undertook a performance tour of the United States in 1977, and published his first autobiography Guilda, elle et moi in 1979.

In the 1980s, Guilda appeared in an episode of Télévision de Radio-Canada's annual New Year's Eve special Bye Bye, portrayed the Chevalier d'Éon in an episode of Radio-Canada's dramatic anthology series Les Grands Esprits, and appeared in André Forcier's 1988 film Kalamazoo. In 1983 he launched the stage revue Viva Guilda. In 1985, he acted in a production of Sylvie Lemay's stage play Qui a vendu la mèche?. He was the subject of the television documentary film Allez Guilda! in 1986; in the same year, he also undertook a Canadian tour, performing most notably at Expo 86 in Vancouver.

In 1993 he was featured in Lois Siegel's documentary film Lip Gloss.

Having largely retired from stage performing by the late 1980s, he also took up painting, and had a number of exhibitions of his artistic work in the early 2000s. In 2004, he mounted a return show at Montreal's Théâtre National to mark both his 80th birthday and the 50th anniversary of his Montreal stage debut. He published a second autobiography, Guilda: Il était une fois, in 2009.

Over the course of his career, Guilda also recorded and released a number of albums of cabaret pop.

Guida died in 2012, at the age of 88. Guida, who identified as bisexual, was married a number of times and fathered three children.

== Legacy ==
In 2014, Guilda was the subject of Julien Cadieux's documentary film Guilda: Elle est bien dans ma peau.

In 2022, Rita Baga impersonated Guilda in the Snatch Game episode of Canada's Drag Race: Canada vs. the World.
