= Sable Island (film) =

- French: L'Île de sable
- Directed by: Johanne Prégent
- Written by: Gilles Desjardins; Johanne Prégent
- Produced by: Claudio Luca
- Starring: Caroline Dhavernas; Sébastien Huberdeau; Anick Lemay
- Cinematography: Pierre Mignot
- Edited by: Claude Palardy
- Music by: Clode Hamelin
- Production company: Ciné-Télé-Action
- Distributed by: Film Tonic
- Release date: November 5, 1999
- Running time: 90 minutes
- Country: Canada
- Language: French

Sable Island (French: L'Île de sable) is a Canadian drama film, directed by Johanne Prégent and released in 1999. The film stars Caroline Dhavernas as Manou, a 16-year-old girl from smalltown Quebec who runs off with her boyfriend Jim (Sébastien Huberdeau) to Sable Island, Nova Scotia following the death of her mother; during the trip she regularly calls home to speak to her older sister Geneviève (Anick Lemay), who reveals family secrets that radically reconfigure Manou's understanding of her life.

The film's cast also includes François Papineau as Geneviève's boyfriend, and Marie Tifo as Jim's mother.

Huberdeau received a Jutra Award nomination for Best Actor at the 2nd Jutra Awards in 2000.
