= Labrador: Autopsy of Silence =

- French: Labrador - Autopsie du silence
- Directed by: Rodrigue Jean
- Produced by: Rodrigue Jean; Patricia Bergeron; Cédric Bourdeau
- Starring: Christopher Angatookalook; Alexandre Landry; Gabrielle Poulin
- Cinematography: Mathieu Laverdière
- Edited by: Paul Chotel; Omar Elhamy
- Music by: Radwan Moumneh
- Production company: Transmar Films
- Distributed by: H264 Distribution
- Release dates: June 6, 2026 (Tribeca); February 12, 2027 (Canada)
- Running time: 120 minutes
- Country: Canada
- Languages: English; French; Inuktitut

Labrador - Autopsy of Silence (French: Labrador - Autopsie du silence) is a Canadian crime thriller film, directed by Rodrigue Jean and released in 2026. The film stars Christopher Angatookalook as Alupa Tulugak, an Inuk mechanic working on a cargo ship supplying remote communities in Labrador, who becomes a murder suspect after his lover Alex (Alexandre Landry), the ship's cook, turns up dead.

The cast also includes Gabrielle Poulin as Michelle, the ship's captain who has also pressured Alex into a sexual relationship, as well as Arsaniq Deer and Jassinth Thiagarajah in supporting roles.

The film premiered at the 2026 Tribeca Film Festival.

Labrador - Autopsy of Silence will come out in theatres in Quebec on February 12, 2027.

== Casting ==
- Christopher Angatookalook : Alupa Tulugak
- Alexandre Landry : Alex
- Gabrielle Poulin B. : Michelle
- Jassinth Thiagarajah : Shakir
- Arsaniq Deer : Donna

== Critical response ==
Olga Artemyeva of Screen Anarchy compared the film to Anatomy of a Fall, writing that "Silence becomes one of the film’s most crucial aesthetic tools, as it isn’t merely something that is kept to possibly conceal the truth. It's a vault to hold together all of the things that simply cannot be put into words. Just like with the sea or the vast landscapes of ice and snow, captured in a mesmerizing way by Mathieu Laverdière’s camera, there is always a sense of something bigger and more complex behind Alupa’s reserved presence."

For Screen Daily, Nikki Baughan wrote that "In keeping with its central characters, this claustrophobic pressure-cooker tension never reaches fever-pitch but is kept simmering by Laverdiere’s evocative cinematography, which contrasts the desolate, industrial external landscape, wrought in cold blues and greys, with the warm intimacy between Alex and Alupa. Alex’s small cabin becomes a cosy enclave, a tiny space where they can truly be themselves; that it is also the scene of the murder is particularly distressing. While Radwan Ghazi Moumneh’s yearning, barely-there score adds a subtle layer of emotional texture, the soundscape largely relies on heightened ambient sounds – the creaking of the boat, the howling of a blizzard, the snap of the ice beneath the hull – to underscore the film’s haunting atmosphere."

== Awards ==
Award	Year	Category	Recipient	Result	Ref
Tribeca Film Festival	2026	Best International Narrative Feature	Rodrigue Jean	Won	
Tribeca Film Festival	2026	Best Performance in an International Narrative Feature	Christopher Angatookalook	Won	
Tribeca Film Festival	2026	Best Cinematography in an International Narrative Feature	Mathieu Laverdière	Won	
