= Martin Matte =

Canadian comedian and actor

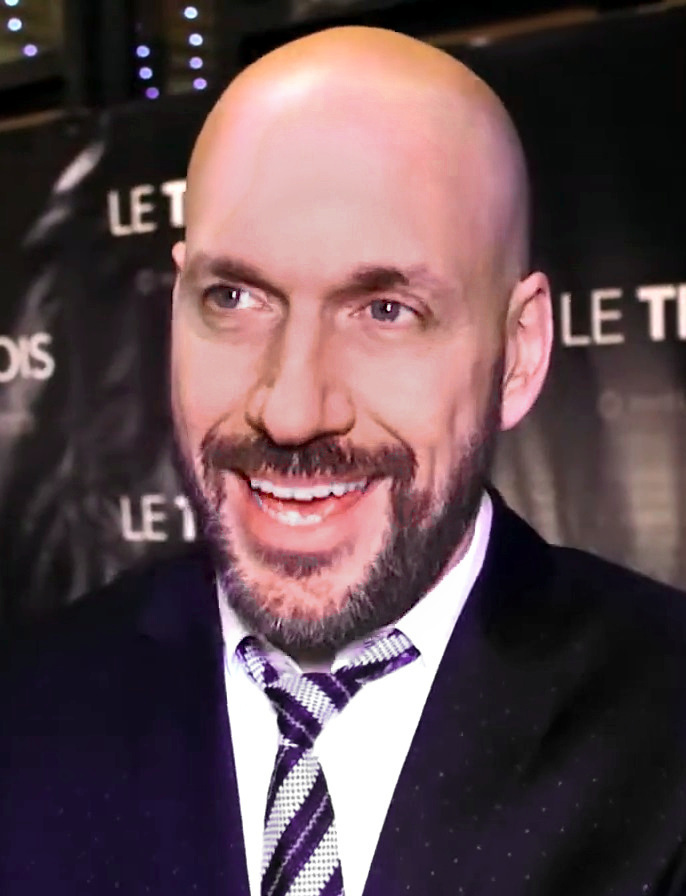
Martin Matte 2017

Martin Matte (born April 14, 1970) is a Canadian stand-up comedian and actor from Laval, Quebec. He created and starred in the television sitcom Les Beaux malaises, and is the current spokesperson for Quebec grocery store chain Maxi, a position he has held since 2016.

== Career ==
Matte studied marketing and administration at the Université du Québec à Montréal, and comedy at the École nationale de l'humour, before beginning his career as a radio host on CKOI-FM and CKMF-FM.

=== Stand-up comedy ===
While working as a radio host he began to perform as a stand-up comedian, winning the award for Revelation of the Year at the Gala Les Olivier in 1999.

In 2000 he launched his first solo stand-up comedy show, Histoires vraies, following up with Condamné à l'excellence in 2007 and Eh la la...! in 2017. He has won numerous Olivier and Artis awards for his comedy shows, as well as the Félix Award for Best Comedy Album for Condamné à l'excellence in 2010.

Netflix recorded a performance on the Eh la la...! tour for the comedy special La vie, la mort...eh la la..!, making Matte the first Quebec comedian to get his own Netflix special.

In 2023, Matte became slated to host a short-run prime time talk show on TVA.

=== Acting ===
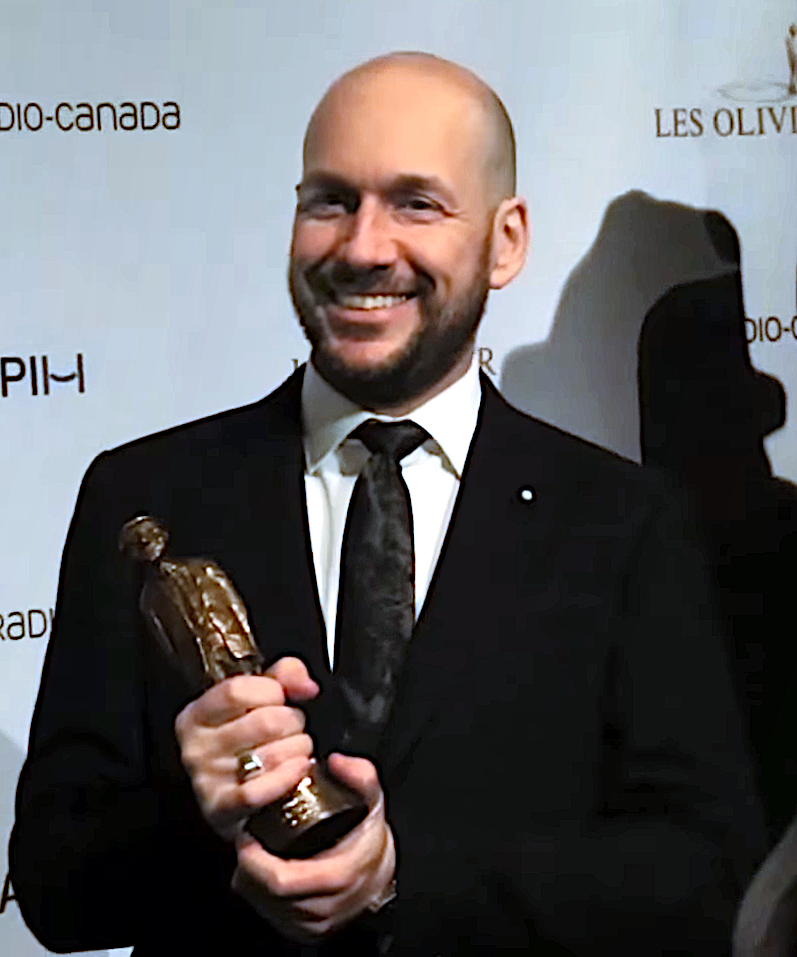
Matte at Gala Les Olivier in 2016

He had early supporting roles in the television series km/h and Les Bougon.

He had a regular role as Bruno Gagnon in the Quebec version of Caméra Café, playing the role from 2002 to 2006 before returning to the series in 2009.

Les Beaux malaises, which starred Matte as a fictionalized version of himself in a comedy based on his own family life, premiered on TVA in 2014. It ran for three seasons until 2016, before ending with a special episode in 2017. Matte won two Gémeaux Awards for best actor in a comedy series during the show's original run, in 2014 and 2015. It then returned for a single new season in 2021.

He has also appeared in the films Nitro and Threesome (Le Trip à trois).

In May 2026 Matte produced and starred in a Netflix original series entitled Vitrerie Joyal, The Glass House in English. It is a quasi biographical account of him and his family.

== Fondation Martin-Matte ==
In 1986, Matte's brother Christian suffered a traumatic brain injury in a car accident, which permanently impaired his short-term memory. Frustrated by the lack of resources for people in his brother's situation, in 2007 Matte launched the Fondation Martin-Matte, which finances the construction of adaptive housing facilities and other social and recreational projects to improve quality of life for brain injury survivors.

As of 2023, the foundation operates eight Maison Martin-Matte facilities across Quebec, with others under construction. Actor and writer Fabien Cloutier, who played the fictionalized version of Christian in Les Beaux malaises, is also a spokesman for the organization.

In 2022, Christian Matte was featured in a rare television appearance, alongside Martin on Télé-Québec's documentary series L'Avenir nous appartient.

== Personal life ==
Matte and his wife, Vicky Pomerleau, split in 2017, which formed part of the storyline for the 2021 revival of Les Beaux malaises. He has more recently been romantically linked with actress Laurence Leboeuf.
