= Threesome (2017 film) =

2017 film by Nicolas Monette

- Film poster
- French: Le Trip à trois
- Directed by: Nicolas Monette
- Written by: Benoît Pelletier
- Produced by: Guillaume Lespérance
- Starring: Mélissa Désormeaux-Poulin; Martin Matte
- Cinematography: Tobie Marier Robitaille
- Edited by: Jean-François Bergeron
- Music by: Frédéric Bégin
- Production company: Zone 3-A Média
- Distributed by: Les Films Séville
- Release date: December 20, 2017
- Running time: 91 minutes
- Country: Canada
- Language: French

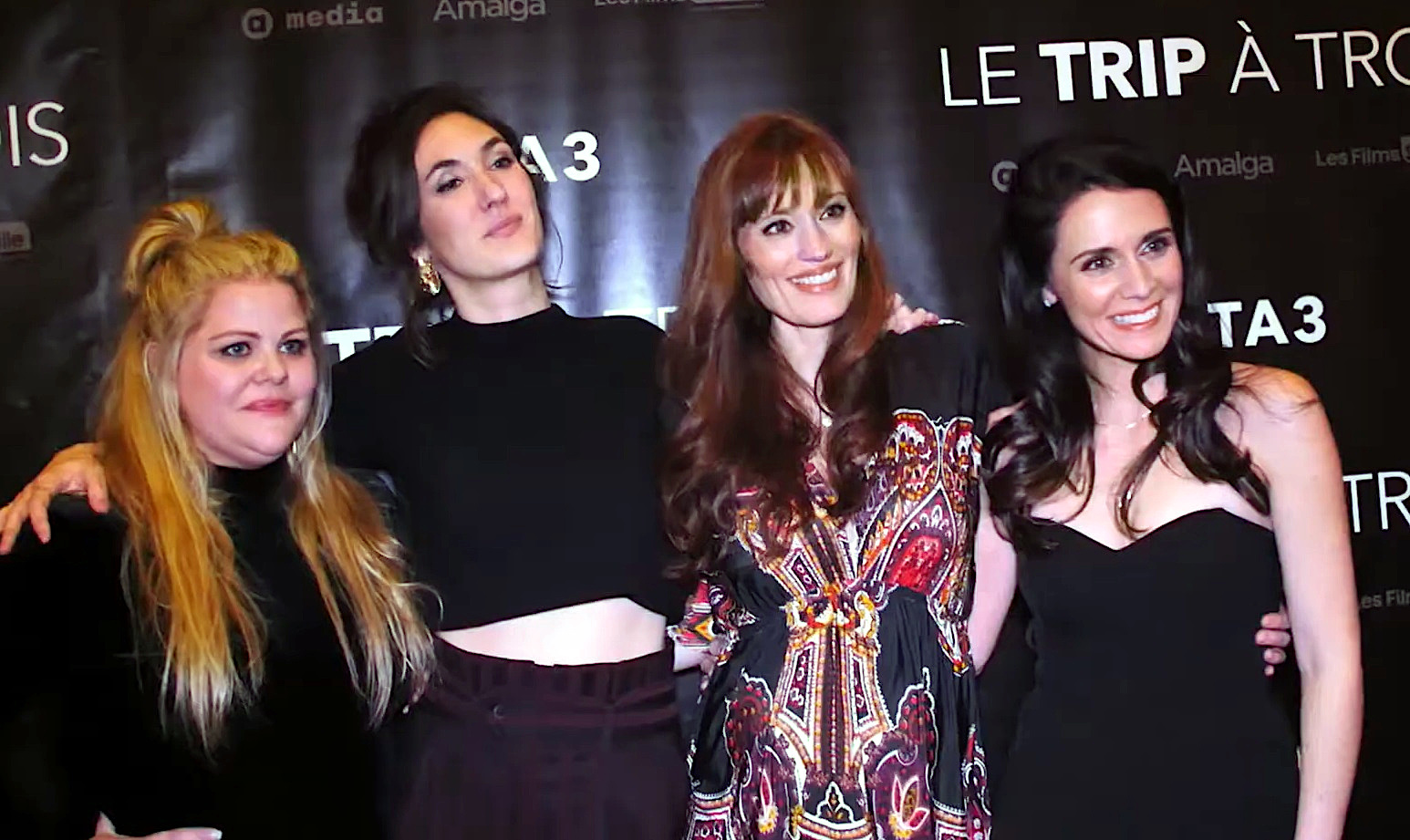
Threesome cast at premiere (Geneviève Schmidt, Karine Gonthier-Hyndman, Bénédicte Décary, Mélissa Désormeaux-Poulin)

Threesome (French: Le Trip à trois) is a Canadian sex comedy film, directed by Nicolas Monette and released in 2017. The film stars Mélissa Désormeaux-Poulin as Estelle, a woman seeking to spice up her stale sex life with her husband Simon (Martin Matte) by organizing a threesome.

The film received two Prix Iris nominations at the 20th Quebec Cinema Awards, for Best Actress (Désormeaux-Poulin) and the Public Prize.
