= Head pull =

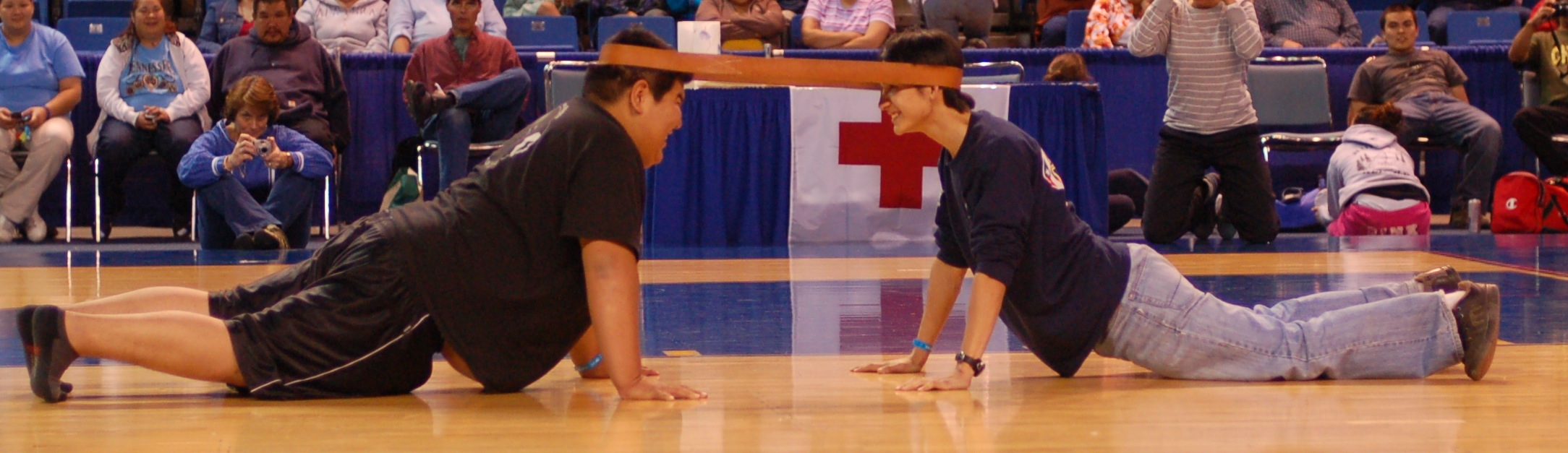
Head pull

Head pull is an Inuit game where two people lie belly-down on the ground, pull each other’s heads, and try to move the opponent across a line. The game is played with a leather loop placed around the competitors’ heads as they face each other. The loop is placed above the ears, and the game becomes more difficult the higher the loop is placed. The winner is the one who first pulls their opponent across the line, or if the loop slips off their opponent’s head. It is an example of an Inuit game that requires little space, such as in small huts.

Also, the competitors may face each other with their legs interlocked and pull their heads backwards until one of the competitors bends forward or gives up. This game is traditionally males only.

It tends to be one of the more popular and competitive games during the Arctic Winter Games.

In 2011, Canadian Governor General David Johnston participated in a head pull competition.
