= Julien Cadieux =

Julien Cadieux is a Canadian documentary filmmaker from New Brunswick. He is most noted for the 2025 documentary television series Cousu, for which he won the Prix Gémeaux for Best Direction in a Lifestyle Documentary in 2026.

Originally from Shediac, New Brunswick, he is an alumnus of the Mel Hoppenheim School of Cinema at Concordia University. He is currently based in Moncton, where he works frequently with production companies such as Phare-Est Media, Bellefeuille Productions and the National Film Board of Canada.

His work addresses themes of identity, memory, rural life and social inclusion, focusing frequently but not exclusively on Acadian and LGBTQ culture. His most noted films have included Guilda : Elle est bien dans ma peau, a profile of québécois drag performer Guilda; There's a Star (Y'a une étoile), a profile of transgender musician Samuel LeBlanc; The Hands of the World (Les mains du monde), a humanistic profile of immigrants who have settled and integrated into the small Acadian town of Cap-Pelé; and Amir My Little Prince (Amir mon petit prince), centred on a young disabled child whose single mother is taking him on a trip around the world.

== Filmography ==
=== Film ===
- Inhabiting Dance (Habiter la danse) - 2009
- Le Vieux garçon - 2010
- Récit d'hyperinflation - 2011
- Julie au bois - 2012
- Guilda : Elle est bien dans ma peau - 2014
- The Lost Kingdom (Le Royaume perdu) - 2019
- Une rivière métissée - 2020
- Farlaques - 2021
- Mon baptême de Sourde - 2022
- There's a Star (Y'a une étoile) - 2023
- Daniel the Weaver (Daniel le tisserand) - 2023
- The Hands of the World (Les mains du monde) - 2025
- Amir My Little Prince (Amir mon petit prince) - 2025

=== Television ===
- The Atlantic Islands (Les îles de l'Atlantique) - 2016
- Imaginons une école pour tous - 2024
- Cousu - 2025
- Bientôt dans nos hôpitaux - 2025
