= Diary of an Aid Worker =

- French: Journal d'un coopérant
- Directed by: Robert Morin
- Written by: Robert Morin
- Produced by: Stéphanie Morissette
- Starring: Robert Morin
- Cinematography: Robert Morin
- Edited by: Michel Giroux
- Music by: Bertrand Chénier
- Production company: Coop Vidéo de Montréal
- Distributed by: Atopia Distribution
- Release date: February 27, 2010 (RVCQ)
- Running time: 91 minutes
- Country: Canada
- Language: French

Diary of an Aid Worker (French: Journal d'un coopérant) is a Canadian drama film, directed by Robert Morin and released in 2010. The film stars Morin as Jean-Marc Phaneuf, a radio technician who works with an organization that helps to launch community radio stations in Africa, who is recording a video diary of his experiences navigating the bureaucratic hassles that hamper international development aid projects.

The cast also includes Jani Alban, Rémi Muhirwa Ciza, Patrice Faye, Chantal Gatore, André Lanthier, Capitaine Madimba, Dominique Puthod, Freddy Sibomana and Rose Twagirayezu.

The film premiered at the Rendez-vous du cinéma québécois in February 2010, before going into limited commercial release in March.
