= Love in the Time of Civil War =

2014 film

- Film poster
- French: L'amour au temps de la guerre civile
- Directed by: Rodrigue Jean
- Screenplay by: Ron Ladd
- Starring: Alexandre Landry; Ana Christina Alva
- Cinematography: Mathieu Laverdière; Étienne Roussy
- Edited by: Mathieu Bouchard-Malo
- Release date: 7 September 2014 (TIFF)
- Running time: 120 minutes
- Country: Canada
- Language: French

Love in the Time of Civil War (French: L'amour au temps de la guerre civile) is a 2014 Canadian drama film directed by Rodrigue Jean. It was selected to be screened in the Contemporary World Cinema section at the 2014 Toronto International Film Festival. The film stars Alexandre Landry as Alex, a male hustler and drug addict in Montreal, Quebec.

== Cast ==
- Ana Christina Alva
- Catherine-Audrey Lachapelle
- Alexandre Landry
- Jean-Simon Leduc as Bruno
- Éric Robidoux
