= Lost Song (film) =

- Theatrical release poster
- Directed by: Rodrigue Jean
- Written by: Rodrigue Jean
- Produced by: Rodrigue Jean; François Landry
- Starring: Suzie LeBlanc; Patrick Goyette; Ginette Morin; Marilou Longpré Pilon; Louise Turcot
- Cinematography: Mathieu Laverdière
- Edited by: Mathieu Bouchard-Malo
- Production company: Transmar Films
- Release date: September 6, 2008 (TIFF)
- Running time: 102 minutes
- Country: Canada
- Language: French

Lost Song is a 2008 drama film by Canadian director Rodrigue Jean. The film focuses on a couple's struggle with postpartum depression. It won the Best Canadian Film Award at the Toronto International Film Festival.

== Plot ==
After the birth of their firstborn baby, Pierre and Élisabeth drive to the country to stay with his mother. The still-unnamed baby is restless, refuses to breastfeed and is having trouble sleeping. When Pierre must return to work, Élisabeth is left alone with the baby. Perplexed as to what to do, she leaves the baby in the care of her overly attentive mother-in-law Louise. Spending time with teenaged neighbor Naomi, Élisabeth finds comfort in the girl's friendship. As the pressure mounts to baptize the baby, Élisabeth considers taking a desperate action.

== Cast ==
- Suzie LeBlanc as Élisabeth
- Patrick Goyette as Pierre
- Ginette Morin as Louise
- Marilou Longpré Pilon as Naomi
- Louise Turcot as Patricia
- Louis Lafrenière-Audette as Michel
- Charles Lafrenière-Audette as Michel
- Normand St-Jacques as Naomi's father
- Luc Dumais as Priest
- Gabrielle Georgieff as Singer
- Lina Fortin as Organist

== Reception ==
On review aggregate website Rotten Tomatoes, Lost Song has an approval rating of 67% based on 6 critics' reviews.

Brian D. Johnson of Maclean's wrote, "This story of a woman’s quiet descent into postpartum depression at a summer cottage in Quebec is...'a perfect marriage of character and landscape.' And as a mediation on dappled lake light and addled psychology, it’s beautifully composed, both austere and lyrical. However, I found it slow, morally schematic and dramatically slack."

The film was selected as one of Canada's Top Ten Films for 2008. Damon D’Oliveira, a member of the Toronto International Film Festival Group which compiled the list, said, "The beauty of Rodrigue Jean's Lost Song is in its simplicity. He has crafted a spare and uncompromising film – rife with humanity – about first-time parents grappling with the mounting pressures of caring for a newborn. Gracefully understated performances creep up and deliver a gut punch at the film's unsettling climax."

== Awards ==
At the Toronto International Film Festival, Lost Song won the award for Best Canadian Feature Film.
