= Men for Sale =

2008 film by Rodrigue Jean

- Theatrical release poster
- French: Hommes à louer
- Directed by: Rodrigue Jean
- Written by: Rodrigue Jean
- Produced by: InformAction; Co-producers: National Film Board of Canada (NFB)
- Cinematography: Mathieu Laverdière
- Edited by: Mathieu Bouchard-Malo
- Music by: Tim Hecker
- Release date: October 2008
- Running time: 140 minutes
- Country: Canada
- Language: French

Men for Sale (French: Hommes à louer, literally "men for rent") is a 2008 documentary film by Canadian director Rodrigue Jean, about male prostitutes working in Montreal, Quebec, Canada. The film was shot over a one-year period in Montreal's Gay Village.

The interviews for Hommes à louer are in French language. The English version Men for Sale has subtitles in English.

Canadian National Film Board calls the documentary "an unflinching portrait with neither voyeurism nor false sympathy acknowledging those society prefers to ignore".

== Synopsis ==
The documentary follows the life of 11 male prostitutes over the course of a year, recounting their struggles to survive alcohol and drug-related addictions, abuse and stigmatization – and their troubled pasts.

Trapped in a vicious circle of prostitution and drugs, they pursue their lives, realizing their prospects for the future are dim.

== Festivals ==
In 2009, the documentary was an official selection for:

- Festival du Nouveau Cinéma
- Festival d'Avignon (63rd season)
- Festival international du cinéma francophone en Acadie (FICFA) (23rd season)
- Atlantic Film Festival
