= Rodrigue Jean =

Canadian film director, screenwriter, and producer

- Born: Caraquet, New Brunswick
- Occupations: Screenwriter, Producer, Director
- Writing career
- Years active: 1989–present

Rodrigue Jean (born in Caraquet, New Brunswick) is a Canadian film director, screenwriter, and producer of Acadian origin. He has been a theatre director, dancer and choreographer.

== Life and work ==
While pursuing university studies, he developed in the 1980s a practice as a dancer and choreographer. In 1986, he went to Japan to train with Tanaka Min. With Tedi Tafel (choreography and performance), Jacques Perron (photography) and Monique Jean (music), he founded Les Productions de l'Os in 1986. A series of performances resulted from this collaboration, which culminated in 1989 with the creation of his first choreographed short film, La déroute.

In 1995, he directed a documentary, La voix des rivières, on Acadians of New-Brunswick, with the support of the National Film Board in Acadia, as well as two short fiction films, La mémoire de l'eau (1996), and L'appel/Call Waiting (1998).

Rodrigue Jean then directed three award-winning feature films: the Acadian trilogy Full Blast (1999), Yellowknife (2001) and Lost Song (2008), that earned him the recognition of critics and made his name as a leading filmmaker. In 2005, with the documentary Living on the Edge, he celebrated the work of the Acadian poet Gérald Leblanc.

During a stay in London in the early 1990s, he worked as a theatre director. He also organised video workshops at Streetwise Youth, a sex worker centre in London (1991–1998). Between 2005 and 2007, after several decades trying to fund this project, he directed the documentary Men for Sale, offering a striking portrait of sex workers in downtown Montreal. In 2009, he founded Epopée, a film action group born out of a co-creation project with the participants of Men for Sale. With Epopée, he deepened his engagement with sex workers, in collaboration with the organization RÉZO.

This collective work, composed of documentaries and fiction films, led to the creation of the installation L'État des lieux (2012), and two feature films, L'État du moment (2012) and L'État du monde (2012). Deepening his research into misrepresented lives, and in continuation with Men for Sale and Epopée, he directed in 2014 the fiction feature Love in the Time of Civil War.

Besides the project on masculine sex work, the collective launched the installation Fractions, presented at the Cinémathèque Québécoise in 2016, and the triptych Insurgence (2013), Rupture (2016), and Contrepoint (2016) on the great political and social movement launched by the 2012 Quebec Student Strike. Epopée also worked on the massive incarceration of Indigenous women in Canada, with the installation The Reappearance of Sheri Pranteau (2018), which was presented as a triptych at the Joliette Museum of Art.

The Acrobat (L'Acrobate) was released in 2020, and Labrador: Autopsy of Silence followed in 2026.

Navigating between documentary and fiction, often mixing genres, and combining ethics and aesthetics, Rodrigue Jean develops a cinematic practice, either by representing people who are deprived of a voice, or by inventing characters driven by their impulses and their desires. Through these two practices of cinema, he examines and questions the constructions of identity and sexuality that stand up against the imperatives of any form of normativity.

== Filmography ==
Director

- 1989: La Déroute - short film
- 1995: La voix des rivières - documentary
- 1996: La mémoire de l’eau - documentary
- 1998: Call Waiting (L'Appel) - short video
- 1999: Full Blast
- 2002: Yellowknife
- 2005: Living on the Edge (L'extrême frontière, l'œuvre poétique de Gérald Leblanc) - documentary
- 2008: Lost Song
- 2009: Men for Sale (Hommes à louer)
- 2012: L'État du moment, documentary co-directed with Hubert Caron-Guay
- 2013: The State of the World (L'État du monde), documentary co-directed with Hubert Caron-Guay
- 2013: Insurgence
- 2014: Love in the Time of Civil War (L'amour au temps de la guerre civile)
- 2016: Rupture
- 2019: The Acrobat (L'Acrobate)
- 2022: 2012/Through the Heart (2012/Dans le cœur) - documentary
- 2026: Labrador: Autopsy of Silence

Producer

- 2002: Yellowknife
- 2008: Lost Song

Writer

- 2002: Yellowknife
- 2008: Lost Song

Actor

- 1991: Letters of Transit (Les Sauf-conduits)

== Web ==
- 2010–2012: Épopée - Travailleurs du sexe - Épopée Group

== Installations ==
- 2012: L'état des lieux — Épopée Group
- 2016: Fraction — Épopée Group
- 2018: Sheri Pranteau: Undisappeared — Épopée Group

== Stage direction ==
- 1991: Wolf Boy by Brad Fraser
- 1992: Antony and Cleopatra
- 1993: Romeo and Juliet
- 1993: Macbeth
- 1993: The Ei (from Funeral Rites by Jean Genet)
- 1994: The Eve (from Funeral Rites by Jean Genet)

== Choreography and performance ==
- 1985: Spirit 1
- 1985: Duet for One Man and One Woman
- 1985: Horse
- 1985: Untitled
- 1985: Oh No
- 1986: Étude 1
- 1986: Spirit 11
- 1986: Spirit 111
- 1987: Études
- 1987: Les Paroles de l’autre
- 1987: Places Are the Only Things You Can Trust
- 1998: Passages
- 1998: Travail inintéressant

== Retrospectives ==
- 2009: Festival d'Avignon, France
- 2012: Cinémathèque québécoise, Canada

== Awards ==
- 1995: La Voix des rivières, Telefilm Canada Prize for Best Medium-Length Canadian film, Festival international du cinéma francophone en Acadie (FICFA)
- 1996: La mémoire de l’eau, Best Documentary, Atlantic Film Festival in Halifax, Nova Scotia
- 1999: Full Blast, Special Jury Citation for the Best Canadian First Feature Film Award, Toronto International Film Festival
- 2002: Yellowknife, Critic's Choice for Best Québec Film, Association québécoise des critiques de cinéma (AQCC)
- 2008: Lost Song, Best Canadian Feature Film, Toronto International Film Festival
