= Lindalee Tracey Award =

Annual film award

- Awarded for: Emerging filmmakers whose work reflects social justice and a strong personal point of view
- Country: Canada
- Presented by: White Pine Pictures
- Website: https://www.whitepinepictures.com/lindaleetraceyaward

The Lindalee Tracey Award is an annual film award, presented in memory of Canadian documentary filmmaker Lindalee Tracey to emerging filmmakers whose works reflect values of social justice and a strong personal point of view. Created by Peter Raymont, Tracey's widower and former filmmaking partner, through his production studio White Pine Pictures, the award is presented annually at the Hot Docs Canadian International Documentary Festival; however, the award is not limited to documentary films, but may be awarded to films in any genre, and films do not have to have been screened as part of the Hot Docs program to be eligible.

== Winners ==
Year	Film	Director(s)	Ref
2007	Rock Pockets	Trevor Anderson	
2008	Abeer	Elizabeth Lazebnik	
2009	The Fantastic Ballet of the Mind and Its Master	Will Inrig	
2009	Antoine	Laura Bari	
2010	Forgotten	Ayanie Mohamed	
2011	Clé 56	Alexandre Hamel	
2012	Glamour Guts	Jasmine Oore	
2013	For Dorian	Rodrigo Barriuso	
2013	East Hastings Pharmacy	Antoine Bourges	
2014	The Dirties	Matt Johnson	
2014	The Backward Class	Madeleine Grant	
2015	Mina Walking	Yosef Baraki	
2016	Lost	Michael Chen	
2017	Mariner	Thyrone Tommy	
2018	Kreb	Tim Tracey	
2018	The Red Bicycle	Fazila Amiri	
2019	Our Home	Andy Alvarez	
2020	Bad Omen	Salar Pashtoonyar	
2021	Between Us	Cailleah Scott-Grimes	
2022	The Untouchable	Avazeh Shahnavaz	
2023	A Shore Away (L'Autre rive)	Gaëlle Graton	
2024	Toward You	Meysam Motazedi	
2025	Bulletproof: A Lesbian's Guide to Surviving the Plot	Regan Latimer	
2026	Burcu's Angels	Özgün Gündüz	
