= DINX =

2008 Canadian short film

- Directed by: Trevor Anderson
- Written by: Trevor Anderson
- Produced by: Trevor Anderson
- Starring: Farren Timoteo
- Cinematography: Wes Doyle
- Edited by: Justin Lachance
- Music by: Nik Kozub
- Distributed by: Canadian Filmmakers Distribution Centre
- Release date: 2008
- Running time: 13 minutes
- Country: Canada
- Language: English

DINX is a Canadian short comedy film, directed by Trevor Anderson and released in 2008. The film stars Farren Timoteo as Zack, a young man who works as a shooter boy in a gay strip club but is dissatisfied with his job and aspires to be allowed to perform as a stripper; when called to the office by his boss, however, he unexpectedly finds himself transported, still clad in go-go shorts and carrying a shooter tray, back in time to childhood to revisit the day when he tried to protect himself from bullying by taking the blame when his school's two main troublemakers spray-painted "DINX" on the school wall.

The film had its premiere screening at the National Screen Institute in early 2008, and was screened at the Metro Cinema Edmonton on March 6, before going into wider distribution on the LGBTQ film festival circuit.

== Production ==
The film's genesis came when Anderson visited Remington's, a gay strip club in Toronto, while touring his debut short film Rugburn. Interested in the idea of making a film set in a strip bar but realizing that the story of a stripper or a drag queen had both already been done, he decided to explore the story of a shooter boy, essentially the "low man on the totem pole" in the nightlife hierarchy.

It was shot in 2007 in Edmonton's Starlite Room, with many of its supporting roles played by local Edmonton artists, writers and musicians, including Nik Kozub as the club DJ, Anderson's Wet Secrets bandmate Lyle Bell as a dancer, and Nick Green as Charles.

According to Anderson, "When people see the film at major festivals in Toronto, Vancouver and Montreal, I wanted them to think, 'Wow! I didn't know that existed in Edmonton!' Which it doesn't. But Bruce La Bruce, when he wanted a queercore movement in Toronto that didn't exist, he made films that made it look like it did. Kids eventually came to Toronto to be part of it and created the scene. He changed the social fabric just by imagining it."

== Controversy ==
The film was a subject of minor controversy in 2009 when, following a screening at the Austin Gay and Lesbian Film Festival, the print was impounded by the Canada Border Services Agency upon its return to Canada, purportedly for a review of whether it violated Canada's rules on the importation of obscene materials. The tape was finally returned to Anderson about a month later.

== Awards ==
The film was the winner of the audience award for short films at the 2008 Fairy Tales Queer Film Festival.

In 2008, both DINX and Anderson's documentary film Rock Pockets were shortlisted for the Iris Prize for LGBTQ-themed short films.
