= Kindergarten (2025 film) =

- French: Jardin d'enfants
- Directed by: Jean-François Caissy
- Written by: Jean-François Caissy
- Produced by: Jean-François Caissy
- Cinematography: Nicolas Canniccioni
- Edited by: Mathieu Bouchard-Malo
- Music by: Guillaume Bourque; Jérémi Roy
- Production company: Les Films de l'autre
- Distributed by: Les Films du 3 mars
- Release date: November 22, 2025 (RIDM)
- Running time: 84 minutes
- Country: Canada
- Language: French

Kindergarten (French: Jardin d'enfants) is a Canadian documentary film, directed by Jean-François Caissy and released in 2025. The film centres on young children in kindergarten, focusing on the progression of early childhood development between the ages of one and five in a fly on the wall manner similar to his 2014 high school documentary Guidelines (La marche à suivre).

The film premiered at the 2025 Montreal International Documentary Festival, where it was the winner of the Special Jury Prize in the National Feature competition. At the 2026 DOXA Documentary Film Festival, it received an honorable mention from the Colin Low Award jury.
