= Rodrigo Barriuso =

Cuban film director (born 1988)

- Born: 22 January 1988 (age 38); Vedado, Havana, Cuba
- Citizenship: Cuban, Canadian
- Education: Ryerson University
- Occupation: Film director
- Years active: 2008–present
- Website: Official website

Rodrigo Barriuso (born 1988) is a Cuban-Canadian filmmaker, most noted as co-director with his brother Sebastián Barriuso of the film A Translator (Un traductor),

Born in 1988 in Havana, Barriuso moved to Canada in the late 2000s to study film at Ryerson University. His short film For Dorian premiered at the Ryerson University Film Festival, the annual festival of short films by Ryerson film students; it later won the juried award for Best Canadian Film at the 2013 Inside Out Film and Video Festival, and was co-winner with Antoine Bourges's East Hastings Pharmacy of the 2013 Lindalee Tracey Award.

A Translator premiered at the 2018 Sundance Film Festival. The Barriuso brothers won the Golden Goblet Award for Best Director at the 2018 Shanghai International Film Festival, and the film was selected as the official Cuban entry for the Best International Feature Film at the 92nd Academy Awards in 2019.

Barriuso remains based in Toronto, Ontario, where he is a Spanish studies instructor at Toronto Metropolitan University.

Neverman, his second feature film, premiered in the Centrepiece program at the 2026 Toronto International Film Festival.
