= AnastasiaDate =

Online dating website

- Company type: Private
- Website type: Online dating service
- Founded: March 1993
- Founders: David Besuden; Elena Besuden
- Services: E-mail correspondence, video chat, live chat
- Website: www.anastasiadate.com
- Registration: Yes
- Users: 4 million
- Launched: January 21, 1997; 29 years ago
- Current status: Active

AnastasiaDate is an international online dating website that primarily connects men from North America with women from Eastern Europe.

== History ==
AnastasiaDate was founded in 1993 and is now owned and controlled by Dmitry Borisovich Volkov.

In the early 1990s when the company first launched, it used catalogs to introduce men to Russian women. The company launched its first website in January 1997 and expanded its business in more cities throughout Russia and Ukraine. By 2003, it experienced global growth beyond northern Asia.

Following the growth of AnastasiaDate, the company spun off three websites during 2007, each connecting western men with women from different areas of the world: AmoLatina, AsianBeauties (now AsianDate), and AfricaBeauties.

AnastasiaDate was featured in the Canadian documentary film Love Translated in 2010.

Fortune reported that the company earned $110 million in 2012. The website's traffic also grew by 220% in 2012.

In 2013, the company hired Mark Brooks as its Chief Strategy Officer.

AnastasiaDate launched its first mobile app on iTunes and Google Play for Apple Inc. and Android devices. The company alleged in a US Federal Court in New York complaint that EM Online had created two websites, anastasiadatefraud.com and ruadventures.com, to broadcast fabricated, negative testimonials, but the complaint was dismissed.

== Ownership ==
In 2011, AnastasiaDate was sold by Anastasia International to Dmitriy Borisovich Volkov. The company and its sister sites are now owned by Social Discovery Ventures, now part of the Dating Group. A separate company, SOL Networks, based in Malta, is a stakeholder of AnastasiaDate. In October 2019, SOL Holdings and SDVentures merged to create the Dating Group. AnastasiaDate has previously been "registered" in Cyprus, Latvia, Seychelles and Malta.

== ICIJ offshore leaks connection ==
AnastasiaDate Ltd appears in the ICIJ offshore leaks database and is linked to both Malta and the British Virgin Islands. SOL Networks, SOL Holdings, Social Discovery Ventures and Dmitry Volkov all appear in the ICIJ offshore leaks database. The dating.com group parent company also appears in the ICIJ offshore leaks database.

== Operations ==
Users can register for an account on the internet or through its mobile app. The site features various communication services such as email correspondence, live chat and video chat. Women access the site through a Ukrainian portal, svadba.com.

The site is mostly used by wealthy American men between the ages of 35 and 60. The site makes money by charging users who want to meet Eastern European women. As of 2012, such users buy credits "priced on a sliding scale, starting at $15.99 for 20 credits, and going up to $399.99 for 1,000. Each minute of simple, instant messaging-style chatting costs one credit. Special, premium smilies – like a vibrating, multi-color LOL – cost extra. Cam share (audio not enabled) costs six credits a minute. Video chat with voice costs even more". The Fortune article observes: "And thanks to people like me willing to pay to talk with beautiful young women like Anastasia – who was paid to respond – the trade is doing pretty well".

Users that register on AnastasiaDate may also be co-registered on their affiliated partner websites: AfricanDate/AfricaBeauties, ArabianDate, AsianBeauties/AsianDate, AmoLatina, ChinaLove, YourChristianDate, EuroDate, FlirtWith, DateMyAge, YourTravelMates, Dil Mil, uDates and Dating.com. Many are based on similar software architecture platforms.

== Reputation ==
The legitimacy of AnastasiaDate has previously come into question. The Guardian journalist reported that "none of the men I became close to on my tour ended up in lasting relationships, and the majority appeared to fall victim to a number of sophisticated scams". A girl on the site who was interviewed "explained the whole sordid array of techniques, from a light impersonalised online-chatting version to a full-service chauffeur-driven platinum fraud, where men are rinsed of cash for a full week in Odesa, thinking they are cementing a lifelong relationship while actually being strung along on platonic dates that end with them dispatched to the airport with heavy hearts and empty wallets". The same article added that "AnastasiaDate insists that it weeds out scams whenever it finds them, and has banned some women from the site".

Even acting within the regulations, international dating sites like AnastasiaDate could potentially exploit women in less-developed countries and male suitors in developed countries. A 2014 report in The Guardian found examples of exploitation for both genders.

AnastasiaDate was mentioned in Dan Slater's novel, "Love in the Time of Algorithms: What Technology Does to Meeting and Mating." In this book, Slater followed a small group of men on an unsuccessful attempt to meet women in person who they had met online via Anastasia's AmoLatina website (the women all coincidentally disappeared when the men arrived in Colombia to meet them). He concludes as well that "the staffs of local bridal agencies will often pose as the women in the profiles, responding to incoming messages in order to keep the rubles rolling in". Anastasia was also featured in a movie Love Translated.

== Allegations regarding AnastasiaDate operations under the Dating.com umbrella ==
In May 2026, the independent Russian outlet Verstka published an investigation linking Dmitry Borisovich Volkov, as a co-founder of Social Discovery Group, to the operation of Dating.com and AnastasiaDate, which it described as systematically deceiving paying users. Drawing on interviews with current and former employees of a Tbilisi-based contractor, Web Flex, the report stated that conversations users believed to be with the people shown in profiles were instead produced by shift-working operators impersonating them around the clock, increasingly with the assistance of artificial intelligence. According to the investigation, operators used voice-cloning tools to conduct paid calls in a model's voice, a content department generated photographs and videos of the models on demand, and an embedded chatbot continued conversations whenever an operator did not reply within a minute.

The investigation described a business model in which revenue is extracted per action, with users paying site "credits" for each message, photograph, minute of video, and virtual gift, which it said created a financial incentive to prolong correspondence while never allowing a real-world meeting. It reported individual users spending thousands of dollars per month, including one 70-year-old American described as spending US$8,000 in a single month. Verstka noted that the Dating.com terms of service disclose that the company may engage independent contractors termed "Suppliers" who have access to all user correspondence, while the same terms prohibit users from employing bots or "artificial personalities".

=== Response and denials ===
In a comment to Verstka, Dmitry Borisovich Volkov stated that he had been one of the founders of SDG "many years ago" and remained an investor in the dating companies DilMil and CupidMedia, but said he had no role in their operational management and that his focus was investing; he denied that the individuals identified as operating Web Flex had ever worked under him. Social Discovery Group, responding through a crisis consultant, denied hiring chat operators or working with contractors such as Web Flex, stated that every profile must be created and managed by the real person it represents, and said the company had removed more than 30,000 accounts for fraudulent or scam-related activity in 2025. The report also noted a 2024 lawsuit filed in New York by a user, Michelle Grimmett, against Dating.com's financial operator, alleging violations of anti-racketeering law and deceptive practices; the case was referred to arbitration with no ruling issued, and Dmitry Borisovich Volkov was not named in the court documents.

== Ongoing Investigations into AnastasiaDate and the dating.com Group ==
Several recent public‑record compilations and media reports have raised questions about the operational structure and consumer‑protection practices of the Dating.com Group and associated entities (including Social Discovery Group, SOL Networks, Venta Solutions, DMM Solutions, KREOVA TECH, FINIZE LTD, Dil Mil, and the acquired Cupid Media network). These materials do not assert proven wrongdoing but document a number of investigative leads that regulators, journalists, and consumer‑protection bodies may be examining. Key themes appearing in public reporting and dossiers include:

=== Supplier / Affiliate Access to User Communications ===
Terms of service for AnastasiaDate describe “Suppliers” or affiliate partners who may assist with registration, translation, media curation, or communication support. Some versions of the Terms state that Suppliers may have access to user correspondence. These disclosures have prompted questions about the extent of third‑party involvement in paid romantic interactions.

=== Pay‑Per‑Action Monetisation ===
Many Dating.com‑family platforms including AnastasiaDate use credit‑based or pay‑per‑interaction billing (e.g., paid chats, paid emails, paid video calls). Critics argue that this model may incentivise prolonged engagement rather than genuine dating outcomes.

=== Multi‑Entity Corporate Attribution ===
Public records show a complex structure involving multiple operators across Malta, Cyprus, Singapore, the United States, and Australia. Different brands list different operators, data controllers, app developers, and support entities. This segmentation has been cited as a barrier to consumer accountability.

== DDOS attack ==
In September 2015, Anastasiadate.com suffered from a series of DDoS attacks that rendered it inaccessible to users for four to six hours every day. Having demonstrated their capability, hackers contacted the dating site and demanded US$10,000 (£7,234) in exchange for stopping further attacks.

After this incident, Anastasiadate.com hired a data security company to investigate this case, identify those responsible, and bring the perpetrators to justice. During the investigation experts at International data security firm Group-IB confirmed that the attack was carried out by Ukrainian nationals Gayk Grishkian and Inna Yatsenko. They also found that the two hackers targeted other prominent firms like US-based Stafford Associated that leased data center and hosting facilities and another firm named PayOnline.

Subsequently, a complaint filed by the company helped Ukrainian authorities arrest the two hackers and an analysis of data stored in their confiscated devices confirmed their involvement in the crimes. After they pleaded guilty, they were sentenced to five years in prison.

== Reception ==
With the growth of online services like AnastasiaDate, the International Marriage Broker Regulation Act was passed in 2005 to regulate the industry. News outlets call AnastasiaDate the leading "premium international dating" website and have observed its efforts to seemingly rebrand the mail-order bride industry, within which it is grouped.
