= Docking (film) =

2019 film

- Film poster
- Directed by: Trevor Anderson
- Written by: Trevor Anderson
- Produced by: Alyson Richards
- Narrated by: Trevor Anderson
- Cinematography: Peter Wunstorf
- Edited by: Justin Lachance
- Music by: Lyle Bell
- Release date: January 2019 (Sundance)
- Running time: 5 minutes
- Country: Canada
- Language: English

Docking is a Canadian short film, directed by Trevor Anderson and released in 2019. Mostly wordless apart from a brief introductory narration by Anderson, the film metaphorically explores his fears and insecurities about dating as a gay man through the depiction of a large penis flying alone through space until meeting another penis and docking with it.

Anderson worked with production designer Todd Cherniawsky and make-up artist Christien Tinsley to create the film. The score was composed by Lyle Bell, Anderson's bandmate in The Wet Secrets. Anderson has described the film as an attempt to push the boundaries of non-fiction filmmaking, by reducing the element of personal essay and increasing the element of cinematic fantasia; however, he has also acknowledged that he had some difficulty convincing arts funders that the film was meant as a serious artistic statement and not just a five-minute dick joke.

The film premiered at the 2019 Sundance Film Festival. In December 2019, the film was named to the Toronto International Film Festival's annual year-end Canada's Top Ten list for short films.

The film received a Canadian Screen Award nomination for Best Animated Short Film at the 8th Canadian Screen Awards in 2020.
