= For Dorian =

- Film poster
- Directed by: Rodrigo Barriuso
- Written by: Rodrigo Barriuso
- Produced by: Rodrigo Barriuso; Davina Rimmer
- Starring: Ron Lea; Dylan Harman
- Cinematography: Kelly Jeffrey
- Edited by: Michelle Szemberg
- Music by: Michael Vincent
- Production company: El Pensamiento Films
- Release date: June 2, 2012
- Running time: 16 minutes
- Country: Canada
- Language: English

For Dorian is a 2012 Canadian short drama film, written and directed by Rodrigo Barriuso. The film stars Ron Lea as Oliver Baum, the father of a child with Down syndrome (Dylan Harman) who is struggling to come to terms with his son's sexual awakening as gay.

The film premiered in 2012 at the TIFF Bell Lightbox as part of the Ryerson University Film Festival, the annual festival of short films by Ryerson University film students. Its subsequent screenings included the 2013 Slamdance Film Festival and the 2013 Inside Out Film and Video Festival, where it won the juried award for Best Canadian Film. It was co-winner with Antoine Bourges's East Hastings Pharmacy of the Lindalee Tracey Award.

It was subsequently included in Boys on Film 11: We Are Animals, the eleventh volume of Peccadillo Pictures' Boys on Film DVDs of gay-themed short films.
