= Jesse Jams =

2020 film by Trevor Anderson

- Directed by: Trevor Anderson
- Produced by: Trevor Anderson; Alyson Richards
- Starring: Jesse Jams
- Cinematography: Mike McLaughlin
- Edited by: Sarah Taylor
- Music by: Lyle Bell
- Production company: Trevor Anderson Films
- Distributed by: Telus
- Release date: March 8, 2020 (Outfest Fusion)
- Running time: 16 minutes
- Country: Canada
- Language: English

Jesse Jams is a Canadian short documentary film, directed by Trevor Anderson and released in 2020. The film is a portrait of Jesse Jams, a transgender First Nations musician from Edmonton, Alberta who formed the punk rock band Jesse Jams and the Flams as a tool of healing from his history of trauma and mental illness.

The film premiered in March 2020 at Outfest Fusion. Concurrently with the release of the film, Jesse Jams and the Flams released You Don't Know Crazy, an EP of some of the songs heard in the film.

The film received a Canadian Screen Award nomination for Best Short Documentary at the 9th Canadian Screen Awards in 2021.
