= Farren Timoteo =

Canadian actor and theatre director

Farren Timoteo is a Canadian stage actor, theatre director and playwright from Edmonton, Alberta, best known for his one-man play Made in Italy.

== Career ==
He began his career as an actor and theatre director in the 2000s, becoming artistic director of Alberta Musical Theatre in 2006.

As a director, he has been associated principally with musical theatre, including productions of Songs for a New World, The Soldier's Tale, Buddy: The Buddy Holly Story, The 25th Annual Putnam County Spelling Bee, Everybody Goes to Mitzi's, The Infinite Shiver, Pippin, Crazy for You, H.M.S. Pinafore and The Light in the Piazza. As an actor he has performed in both musical and non-musical roles, including productions of Little Shop of Horrors, Jersey Boys, Spamalot, Forever Plaid, As You Like It and Coriolanus. He has also had occasional film, television and video game roles, most notably in Trevor Anderson's 2008 short film DINX.

In the fall of 2025, he is slated to become artistic director of Edmonton's Teatro La Quindicina.

=== Made in Italy ===
Made in Italy, a one-man show inspired by his father's coming-of-age as a first-generation Italian Canadian son of immigrants in Alberta in the 1970s, had its premiere at the Western Canada Theatre in 2016.

Timoteo has since toured the show to numerous other theatres in Canada, including the Arts Club Theatre in Vancouver, the Citadel Theatre in Edmonton, the Manitoba Theatre Centre in Winnipeg, the Thousand Islands Playhouse in Gananoque, Theatre Aquarius in Hamilton, the Persephone Theatre in Saskatoon, and a run at the CAA Theatre in Toronto in 2025.

== Awards ==
Award	Date of ceremony	Category	Work	Result	Ref.
Elizabeth Sterling Haynes Award	2010	Outstanding Score for a Play or Musical	Everybody Goes to Mitzi's! with Ryan Sigurdson	Won	
Elizabeth Sterling Haynes Award	2012	Outstanding Artistic Achievement, Theatre for Young Audiences	Pinocchio	Won	
Elizabeth Sterling Haynes Award	2013	Outstanding Performance by an Actor in a Supporting Role	Spamalot	Won	
Elizabeth Sterling Haynes Award	2019	Outstanding Performance in a Leading Role - Comedy	Made in Italy	Won	
Jessie Richardson Theatre Award	2022	Outstanding Performance in a Leading Comedic Role	Made in Italy	Won	
