= Philippe Lesage =

Canadian film director and screenwriter

- Occupations: Film director, screenwriter
- Years active: 2000s–present
- Notable work: The Heart that Beats (Ce cœur qui bat), The Demons (Les Démons), Genesis (Genèse)

Philippe Lesage is a Canadian film director and screenwriter from Quebec. Originally a documentary filmmaker, he moved into narrative feature filmmaking in the 2010s with the films Copenhague: A Love Story, The Demons (Les Démons) and Genesis (Genèse).

Born in Saint-Agapit, Quebec and raised in Longueuil and Montreal, Lesage studied at McGill University and the European Film College. His first documentary film, Pourrons-nous vivre ensemble ?, was released in 2006. He won a Jutra Award for Best Documentary for The Heart that Beats (Ce cœur qui bat) at the 14th Jutra Awards in 2012.

The Demons premièred at San Sebastián International Film Festival in Official Competition. It has since been selected in more than 70 festivals around the world and has won several awards. The Demons was selected in Guy Lodge's Top Ten Films of 2015 in Variety and in the Toronto International Film Festival Canada's Top Ten. It won the Golden Gate New Director Prize at the San Francisco International Film Festival in 2016 and the Quebec Film Critic Association honoured the film with its two annually awards: Best Canadian film of 2015 and Best Film from the International Competition of the Montreal Film Festival of New Cinema.

In 2018, he directed Genesis (Genèse). Premiered at the Locarno Festival in the International Competition, the film has won numerous awards including the Golden Wolf (Festival of New Cinema, Montreal), Best Film and Best Director Awards at Seminci in Valladolid (Spain) and Best Film at Los Cabos International Film Festival (Mexico) festivals. The film was also selected at the renowned Museum of Modern Art and Film Society of Lincoln Center's New Directors/New Films Festival, AFI FEST, and Rotterdam Film Festival. It ranked #16 best films of 2019 by Metacritic.

His next film, Who by Fire (Comme le feu) was selected in the Generation 14plus section at the 74th Berlin International Film Festival, where it had its world premiere on 17 February and won the Grand Prix of the International Jury of Generation.

Lesage has also taught documentary filmmaking at the European Film College in 2008–2009.

His brother Jean-François Lesage is also a filmmaker.

== Films ==
- 2006: Pourrons-nous vivre ensemble ?
- 2009: How Can You Tell If the Little Fish Are Happy? (Comment savoir si les petits poissons sont heureux ?)
- 2010: The Heart that Beats (Ce cœur qui bat)
- 2012: Laylou
- 2015: The Demons (Les Démons)
- 2016: Copenhague: A Love Story
- 2018: Genesis (Genèse)
- 2024: Who by Fire (Comme le feu)

== Awards and nominations ==
- 2010: Award for Best National Documentary, Montreal International Documentary Festival (RIDM)
- 2010: Award for Best New Director, Montreal International Documentary Festival
- 2012: Jutra Award 2012, Best Documentary
- 2015: Critic Award (AQCC) for Best Film, International Competition, Festival of New Cinema, 2015
- 2016: Nomination for Best Film, Gala du Cinema Québécois
- 2016: Nomination for Best Director, Gala du Cinéma Québécois
- 2016: Gilles-Carles Award for Best First or Second feature fiction film
- 2016: Luc-Perreault Award / AQCC for Best Film from Quebec
- 2016: Nomination for Best Film, Canadian Screen Awards
- 2016: Nomination for Best achievement in Directing, Canadian Screen Awards
- 2016: Nomination for The Ingmar Bergman International Debut Award
- 2016: Titanic Award for Best Film, International Competition, Budapest
- 2016: Golden Gate New Director Prize, San Francisco International Film Festival
- 2018: Golden Wolf for Best Feature Film International Competition, Festival du nouveau cinéma
- 2018: Golden Spike for Best Feature Film International Competition, Valladolid International Film Festival
- 2018: Best Director, Valladolid International Film Festival
- 2018: Best Feature Film Award International, Los Cabos International Film Festival
