= Love in the Time of Fentanyl =

- Directed by: Colin Askey
- Produced by: Monika Navarro; Marc Serpa Francoeur; Robinder Uppal
- Cinematography: Colin Askey; Eric Sanderson
- Edited by: Colin Askey
- Music by: Eli Cohn
- Production companies: Castle Mountain Media; Independent Television Service; Lost Time Media
- Release date: May 10, 2022 (DOXA)
- Running time: 85 minutes
- Country: Canada
- Language: English

Love in the Time of Fentanyl is a 2022 documentary film by Colin Askey, about group of people who operate a safe injection site in the Downtown Eastside neighborhood of Vancouver.

The film was the winner of the Colin Low Award at the 2022 DOXA Documentary Film Festival.
