= Guidelines (film) =

2014 Canadian film by Jean-Francois Caissy

- Film poster
- French: La marche à suivre
- Directed by: Jean-François Caissy
- Cinematography: Nicolas Canniccioni
- Edited by: Mathieu Bouchard-Malo
- Production company: National Film Board of Canada
- Release date: February 11, 2014 (Berlin International Film Festival)
- Country: Canada
- Language: French

Guidelines (French: La marche à suivre) is a 2014 Canadian feature-length documentary by Jean-François Caissy about adolescent students at the École Antoine Bernard high school in the rural community of Carleton-sur-Mer, in the Gaspésie–Îles-de-la-Madeleine region. The film uses a fly on the wall style of documentary storytelling as it chronicles such issues as drug use, bullying and disruptive behaviour, while contrasting school life with the freedom of the outdoors. In conversations between teachers or social workers and students, Caissy often makes use of a fixed camera, so that voices of adult authority are off-screen and unseen.

Caissy has stated that Guidelines is part of a series of films he plans to make on five stages of human life: childhood, adolescence, young adulthood, middle age as well as old age, which was the subject of his 2010 feature documentary La belle visite. Caissy grew up in the Gaspésie region, and was drawn to the Antoine Bernard school because it reminded him of his own experiences as a youth.

The film is produced by the National Film Board of Canada.

== Release ==
Guidelines had its world premiere at the Berlin International Film Festival. Its awards include the World Pulse Award for best documentary at IndieLisboa, as well as Canadian Screen Award nominations for Best Feature Length Documentary, Best Editing in a Documentary (Mathieu Bouchard-Malo) and Best Cinematography in a Documentary (Nicolas Canniccioni) at the 3rd Canadian Screen Awards.
