= Colin Low Award =

Annual Canadian film award

The Colin Low Award is a juried annual film award presented at the DOXA Documentary Film Festival to recognize the director of best Canadian documentary film screened at that year's festival. The award is named in honour of influential Canadian documentary filmmaker Colin Low.

The award is sponsored by the Directors Guild of Canada and comes with a $5,000 cash prize. The award frequently, but not always, presents an honorable mention in addition to the overall winner.

== Winners ==
Year	Film	Filmmaker(s)	Ref
2013	East Hastings Pharmacy	Antoine Bourges	
2014	Gods, Weeds and Revolutions	Meryam Joobeur	
2014	Crazywater	Dennis Allen	
2015	On the Trail of the Far Fur Country	Kevin Nikkel	
2015	A Rock and a Hard Place	Cliff Caines	
2016	The Prison in Twelve Landscapes	Brett Story	
2016	Migrant Dreams	Min Sook Lee	
2017	Limit Is the Sky	Julia Ivanova	
2017	A Moon of Nickel and Ice	François Jacob	
2018	Primas	Laura Bari	
2018	Those Who Come, Will Hear (Ceux qui viendront, l'entendront)	Simon Plouffe	
2019	Nîpawistamâsowin: We Will Stand Up	Tasha Hubbard	
2019	Dark Suns (Soleils noirs)	Julien Élie	
2020	Wintopia	Mira Burt-Wintonick	
2021	Kímmapiiyipitssini: The Meaning of Empathy	Elle-Máijá Tailfeathers	
2022	Love in the Time of Fentanyl	Colin Askey	
2022	The Scattering of Man (DƏNE YI’INJETL)	Luke Gleeson	
2023	Mother Saigon (Má Sài Gòn)	Khoa Lê	
2023	2012/Through the Heart (2012/Dans le cœur)	Rodrigue Jean, Arnaud Valade	
2024	The Soldier's Lagoon	Pablo Álvarez Mesa	
2024	Wilfred Buck	Lisa Jackson	
2024	Yintah	Jennifer Wickham, Brenda Michell, Michael Toledano	
2025	Saints and Warriors	Patrick Shannon	
2025	Nechako: It Will Be a Big River Again	Lyana Patrick	
2026	Saigon Story: Two Shootings in the Forest Kingdom	Kim Nguyen	
2026	Kindergarten (Jardin d'enfant)	Jean-François Caissy	
