= Blond Night =

- French: Nuit blonde
- Directed by: Gabrielle Demers
- Written by: Gabrielle Demers
- Produced by: Nellie Carrier
- Starring: Patrick Dorneval; Dany Boudreault
- Cinematography: Chloé Ellegé
- Edited by: Charlie Boisvert; Mathieu Bouchard-Malo
- Music by: Alexis Elina
- Production company: Cinquième Maison
- Distributed by: Travelling Distribution
- Release date: April 2022 (RVQC)
- Running time: 17 minutes
- Country: Canada
- Language: French

Blond Night (French: Nuit blonde) is a Canadian dramatic short film, directed by Gabrielle Demers and released in 2022. The film stars Patrick Dorneval as an autistic man who lives in an assisted living facility; bored with the regimented social activities in the group home, he goes out one night for a walk through the city, where he develops an intimate connection with Jessy (Dany Boudreault), a young man he meets and helps after seeing him get thrown out of a car.

The film premiered at the Rendez-vous Québec Cinéma's Prends ça court gala in April 2022, where it received a special mention from Denis Villeneuve alongside his presentation of the Coup de cœur Prize.

The film received a Prix Iris nomination for Best Live Action Short Film at the 25th Quebec Cinema Awards in 2023.
