= Mathieu Bouchard-Malo =

Canadian film editor

Mathieu Bouchard-Malo is a Canadian film editor from Quebec, who has received multiple Canadian Screen Award and Prix Iris nominations for his work on both narrative and documentary films.

== Filmography ==
- 1999 – Full Blast
- 2002 – Yellowknife
- 2003 – Saved by the Belles (Échappée belles)
- 2004 – À part de t'ça
- 2005 – Red (Le Rouge au sol)
- 2006 – L'air de rien
- 2006 – Pourrons-nous vivre ensemble?
- 2006 – Prenez vos places
- 2006 – The Days (Les Jours)
- 2007 – La lâcheté
- 2008 – Passage
- 2008 – Men for Sale
- 2008 – Lost Song
- 2008 – Tomorrow (Demain)
- 2010 – Mamori
- 2010 – How Can You Tell If the Little Fish Are Happy?
- 2010 – Les mercredis de Rose
- 2010 – The Heart That Beats (Ce cœur qui bat)
- 2010 – Jo for Jonathan (Jo pour Jonathan)
- 2010 – Snow Hides the Shade of Fig Trees (La neige cache l'ombre des figuiers)
- 2010 – Le gardien d'hiver
- 2010 – Journey's End (La belle visite)
- 2011 – La traversée du salon
- 2011 – Nuit #1
- 2011 – Wetlands (Marécages)
- 2011 – La vérité
- 2011 – Nothing Else
- 2012 – Sur le rivage du monde
- 2012 – L'état du monde
- 2012 – Faillir
- 2013 – Conte du Mile End
- 2013 – Arwad
- 2013 – The Day Is Listening
- 2013 – La tête en bas
- 2013 – Fou, rien pis personne
- 2014 – Anna and the Tower
- 2014 – Love in the Time of Civil War
- 2014 – Felix and Meira (Félix et Meira)
- 2014 – Guidelines (La marche à suivre)
- 2015 – Un amour d'été
- 2015 – Our Loved Ones (Les êtres chers)
- 2015 – The Demons (Les Démons)
- 2015 – Noir
- 2016 – Nelly
- 2016 – Gulîstan, Land of Roses (Gulîstan, terre de roses)
- 2016 – Copenhague: A Love Story
- 2017 – Venus
- 2018 – La rivière cachée
- 2018 – First Stripes (Premières armes)
- 2018 – Elegy
- 2018 – Genesis (Genèse)
- 2018 – The Great Darkened Days (La grande noirceur)
- 2018 – With Love (L'Amour)
- 2018 – 50/50
- 2019 – The Cut
- 2019 – Astres
- 2021 – Prayer for a Lost Mitten (Prière pour une mitaine perdue)
- 2021 – No Trace (Nulle trace)
- 2021 – Cercueil, tabarnak!
- 2022 – Norbourg
- 2022 – Rojek
- 2022 – Blond Night (Nuit blonde)
- 2024 – Who by Fire (Comme le feu)
- 2025 – Kindergarten (Jardin d'enfants)

== Nominations ==
Award	Ceremony	Category	Work	Result	Ref(s)
Canadian Screen Awards	2016	Best Editing	Our Loved Ones (Les êtres chers)	Nominated	
Canadian Screen Awards	2015	Best Editing in a Documentary	Guidelines (La marche à suivre)	Nominated	
Canadian Screen Awards	2017	Best Editing in a Documentary	Gulîstan, Land of Roses (Gulîstan, terre de roses)	Nominated	
Prix Iris	2016	Best Editing	Our Loved Ones (Les êtres chers)	Nominated	
Prix Iris	2019	Best Editing	Genesis (Genèse)	Nominated	
Prix Iris	2019	Best Editing	The Great Darkened Days (La grande noirceur)	Nominated	
Prix Iris	2022	Best Editing	Norbourg	Nominated	
Prix Iris	2017	Best Editing in a Documentary	Gulîstan, Land of Roses (Gulîstan, terre de roses)	Nominated	
