= The Little Deputy =

- Directed by: Trevor Anderson
- Produced by: Trevor Anderson
- Starring: Luke Oswald, Shannon Blanchet, Rob Chaulk, Fish Griwkowsky, Jenny McKillop, Trevor Schmidt
- Cinematography: Aaron Munson and Peter Wunstorf
- Edited by: Justin Lachance
- Release date: 23 January 2015 (2015 Sundance Film Festival)
- Running time: 9 minutes
- Country: Canada
- Language: English

The Little Deputy is a Canadian short documentary film, directed by Trevor Anderson and starring Luke Oswald, released in 2015.

== Synopsis ==
This short film blurs documentary and fiction as Anderson re-creates a photograph taken with his father at a West Edmonton Mall photography business while wearing western garb when he was a child in the 1980s. Using the visual tropes of dramatic reenactments seen in documentaries, the photographer initially mistakes young Anderson (played by Luke Oswald) for a girl and offers him a red dress to wear. He corrects the photographer, worried about the consequences of wearing the dress, and ends up wearing a child-sized deputy costume, which he is shown wearing in the real-life photo that inspired the creation of this film.

The second act of The Little Deputy manifests Anderson's childhood wish to wear the red gown. Filmed at Fort Edmonton, Anderson lives his childhood fantasy, wearing a red gown created custom for the director/actor, designed by Nicole Bach-Lebrecque and created by Joanna Johnston, to re-take the photograph.

== Cast ==
- Trevor Anderson as Trevor
- Shannon Blanchet as Angry Dove
- Rob Chaulk as Trevor's Dad
- Fish Griwkowsky as 1886 Photographer
- Jenny McKillop as 1886 Photographer's Wife
- Luke Oswald as Young Trevor
- Trevor Schmidt as 1986 Photographer

== Awards ==
The film premiered at the 2015 Sundance Film Festival.

At the Alberta Film and Television Awards in 2015, The Little Deputy won the Rosie Award for Best Short Film. In December 2015, it was named to the Toronto International Film Festival's annual Canada's Top Ten list of the year's ten best feature and short films.

The film was a shortlisted Canadian Screen Award nominee for Best Short Documentary Film at the 4th Canadian Screen Awards.
