= Rock Pockets =

2007 Canadian short film

- Directed by: Trevor Anderson
- Written by: Trevor Anderson
- Produced by: Trevor Anderson
- Starring: Trevor Anderson; Nik Kozub
- Cinematography: Steven Hope
- Edited by: Steven Hope
- Music by: Trevor Anderson; Raymond Biesinger; Scott Davidchuk
- Production company: Dirt City Films
- Distributed by: Canadian Filmmakers Distribution Centre
- Release date: 2006
- Running time: 5 minutes
- Country: Canada
- Language: English

Rock Pockets is a Canadian short documentary film, directed by Trevor Anderson and released in 2006. Centred around the fact that heterosexual couples have the social freedom to walk around in public quietly communicating their relationship status by tucking their hands in each other's back pockets as they walk, while same-sex couples largely do not, the film depicts Anderson and musician Nik Kozub walking around the Klondike Days festival in Edmonton, Alberta, with their hands in each other's back pockets, and documents the range of reactions from onlookers.

The film premiered in 2006 as part of the Loud 'n' Queer Cabaret, Edmonton's annual LGBTQ arts festival.

It was named the winner of the inaugural Lindalee Tracey Award in 2007, and received an honourable mention for Most Innovative Short Film at the 2007 Seattle Lesbian & Gay Film Festival. In 2008, both Rock Pockets and Anderson's narrative short film DINX were shortlisted for the Iris Prize for LGBTQ-themed short films.
