= Aliya Kanani =

Canadian actress and comedian

Aliya Kanani is a Canadian actress and comedian from Toronto, Ontario. She is most noted for her performance as Ms. Hina in the 2021 film Scarborough, for which she received a Canadian Screen Award nomination for Best Actress at the 10th Canadian Screen Awards in 2022.

In 2022, she premiered the one-woman comedy show Where You From, From? at the Toronto Fringe Festival, and appeared in the film Concrete Valley.
