= The High Level Bridge (film) =

2010 Canadian short film

- Directed by: Trevor Anderson
- Written by: Trevor Anderson
- Produced by: Trevor Anderson
- Narrated by: Trevor Anderson
- Cinematography: Fish Griwkowsky
- Edited by: Justin Lachance
- Production company: Dirt City Films
- Distributed by: Canadian Filmmakers Distribution Centre
- Release date: September 12, 2010 (TIFF)
- Running time: 5 minutes
- Country: Canada
- Language: English

The High Level Bridge is a Canadian short documentary film, directed by Trevor Anderson and released in 2010. The film centres on the High Level Bridge in Edmonton, Alberta, blending historical facts about the bridge with a memorial tribute to residents of the city who had died by suicide by jumping off of it.

The film influenced the city to launch a safety study on the bridge, culminating in the construction of suicide barriers along the bridge in 2015.

The film premiered at the 2010 Toronto International Film Festival. It was subsequently screened at the 2010 AFI Fest, where it received an honorable mention from the short film jury, and at the 2011 Sundance Film Festival.
