= Journey's End (2010 film) =

- Film poster
- French: La Belle Visite
- Directed by: Jean-François Caissy
- Written by: Jean-François Caissy
- Produced by: Jean-François Caissy
- Cinematography: Nicolas Canniccioni
- Edited by: Mathieu Bouchard-Malo
- Music by: Julien Bilodeau
- Production company: Les Films de L'Autre
- Release date: February 11, 2010 (Berlinale)
- Running time: 80 minutes
- Country: Canada
- Language: French

Journey's End (French: La Belle Visite, lit. 'The beautiful visit') is a 2010 Canadian documentary film, directed by Jean-François Caissy. The film profiles the residents of the Auberge des Caps, a former motel in Carleton, Quebec which has been converted into a retirement home.

The film was a Genie Award nominee for Best Feature Length Documentary at the 31st Genie Awards, and a Jutra Award nominee for Best Documentary at the 13th Jutra Awards.
