= Jean-François Caissy =

Canadian film director (born 1977)

Jean-François Caissy (born September 15, 1977) is a Canadian documentary filmmaker from Quebec.

Originally from Carleton-sur-Mer, he trained as a photographer before making films. In addition to his films he has also exhibited as a video artist, and worked in the sound department on Denis Côté's films Wilcox and Social Hygiene (Hygiène sociale).

== Filmography ==
- Mating Season (La Saison des amours) – 2005
- Journey's End (La Belle Visite) – 2010
- Guidelines (La marche à suivre) – 2014
- First Stripes (Premières armes) – 2018
- Kindergarten (Jardin d'enfants) - 2025

== Awards ==
Award	Year	Category	Work	Result	Ref(s)
Genie Awards	31st Genie Awards	Best Feature Length Documentary	Journey's End (La Belle Visite)	Nominated	
Jutra Awards	13th Jutra Awards	Best Documentary Film	Journey's End (La Belle Visite)	Nominated	
Jutra Awards	17th Jutra Awards	Best Documentary Film	Guidelines (La marche à suivre)	Nominated	
Canadian Screen Awards	3rd Canadian Screen Awards	Best Feature Length Documentary	Guidelines (La marche à suivre)	Nominated	
DOXA Documentary Film Festival	2026	Colin Low Award	Kindergarten (Jardin d'enfants)	Honored	
