= Love Translated =

- Directed by: Julia Ivanova
- Produced by: Boris Ivanov
- Cinematography: Rene Smith
- Edited by: Julia Ivanova; Scott MacEachern
- Music by: Dave King; Boris Sichon
- Release date: 2010
- Running time: 84 minutes
- Countries: Canada; Ukraine
- Language: English

Love Translated is a 2010 Canadian documentary film directed and edited by Julia Ivanova which premiered at the 46th annual Chicago International Film Festival.

== Synopsis ==
Ivanova documents 10 men from the United States, Canada, France and Sweden as they travel to Odesa, Ukraine, on a romantic tour, arranged by an online dating company AnastasiaDate, to look for possible wives. While there, the men go to several social events, including a beauty pageant at a nightclub, where they meet large numbers of attractive, single women. The interactions at the socials and on the dates the men go on are facilitated by translators.

The 84-minute movie is broken into 10 segments or chapters, one for each day of the trip, and each with its own subtitle. It uses a framing device of footage of Michael Lau, a Chinese man living in Richmond, British Columbia, who states he has never had 'real girls' in his life, at the beginning of the film. He says that after 30 years in Canada, he is under family pressure to get married. Other men include Calvin, a Marine veteran; Ramon, a doctor; and Ernie, a man from Minnesota. Except for Lau, the other men who don't reveal their last names, cite bad experiences with women, including divorces, as their motivation for joining AnastasiaDate, an online dating site, and going on the trip. They believe that Ukrainian women have more traditional values when compared to the values of non-Ukrainian women.

At the end of the movie, Lau is shown back in his apartment, using his computer to explore the AnastasiaDate.com website after having gone on 10 dates during the trip but failing to find a woman who returns his interest. The film closes with superimposed text that states only one relationship resulted from the trip: one of the interpreters, Lilya, divorced her husband six months after filming, and moved to Minnesota with her daughter to marry Ernie.

== Critical reactions ==
Variety described the movie as, "Far more entertaining than reality TV's The Bachelor, but with its own share of disturbing moments...". Roger Ebert said, "It's [at certain times] excruciating to gauge the degree of one-sided or two-sided exploitation on view". Volkmar Ritcher of the Vancouver Observer wrote that the "Film is briskly edited and always interesting but fairly sad too". Kris Rothstein of Geist magazine said, "While [the film] raises interesting questions, it could have run a lot further with the subject matter." Erin Schowalter of Elevate Difference wrote on March 18, 2011, "All of the issues that normally come up when the topic of mail-order brides is discussed are on display: the somewhat primitivist notion that the women will be untainted by feminism and, therefore, more ideal; the objectification of women’s bodies; the unequal power dynamics".

The film earned Ivanova a nomination for the Artistic Merit Award by Women in Film and Television Vancouver.

It also was screened at the 28th annual Vancouver International Film Festival and the 2011 Little Rock Film Festival. On Sept. 28, 2011, it aired on Discovery Fit & Health.
