= Family Portrait in Black and White =

2011 Canadian documentary film

- Film poster
- Directed by: Julia Ivanova
- Produced by: Boris Ivanov
- Starring: Olga Nenya
- Cinematography: Julia Ivanova; Stanislav Shakhov
- Edited by: Julia Ivanova
- Production company: Interfilm Productions
- Distributed by: First Pond Entertainment
- Release date: January 2011 (Sundance)
- Running time: 90 minutes
- Countries: Canada; Ukraine
- Languages: English; Ukrainian

Family Portrait in Black and White is a Canadian-Ukrainian coproduced documentary film, directed by Julia Ivanova and released in 2011. The film profiles Olga Nenya, a Ukrainian woman who has adopted a large family of biracial children, and tries to protect them from the sometimes virulent anti-African racism of rural Ukrainian society.

The film premiered at the 2011 Sundance Film Festival. It had its Canadian premiere at the 2011 Hot Docs Canadian International Documentary Festival, where it won the award for Best Canadian Feature Documentary.

It was a shortlisted Genie Award nominee for Best Feature Length Documentary at the 32nd Genie Awards in 2012.
