= Julia Ivanova (filmmaker) =

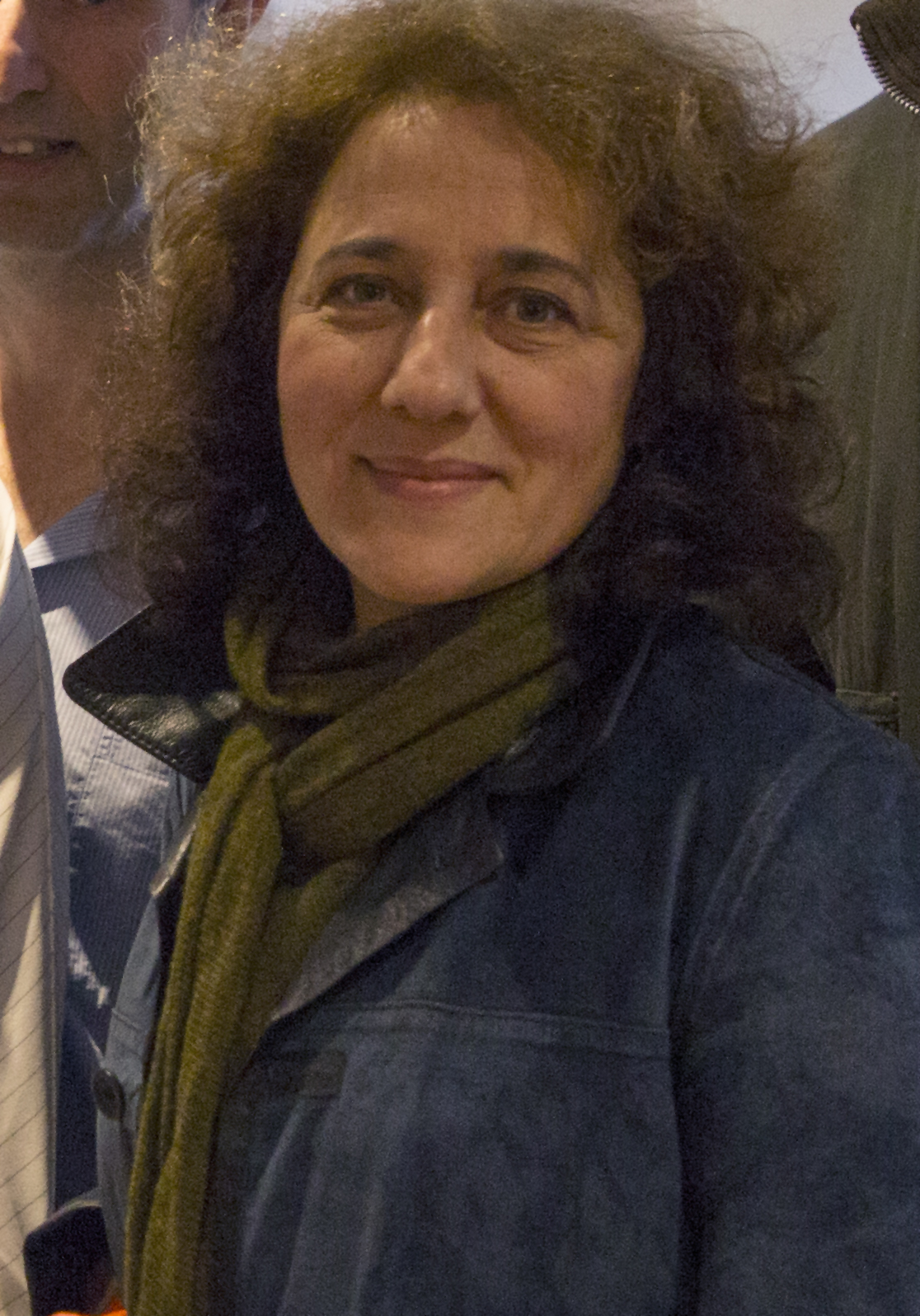
Ivanova in 2019

Julia Ivanova is a Russian-born Canadian documentary filmmaker based in Vancouver, British Columbia. She is most noted for her films Family Portrait in Black and White, which won the award for Best Canadian Feature Documentary at the 2011 Hot Docs Canadian International Documentary Festival and was a shortlisted Genie Award nominee for Best Feature Length Documentary at the 32nd Genie Awards in 2012, and Limit Is the Sky, which won the Colin Low Award at the 2017 DOXA Documentary Film Festival.

She was the subject of a special retrospective program at Hot Docs in 2019.

== Filmography ==
- From Russia, for Love - 2000
- I Want a Woman - 2003
- Moscow Freestyle - 2006
- Fatherhood Dreams - 2007
- Love Translated - 2010
- Family Portrait in Black and White - 2011
- Loving a Stranger - 2012
- High Five: A Suburban Adoption Saga - 2012
- Ash and Oil - 2016
- Limit Is the Sky - 2016
- My Dads, My Moms and Me - 2019
- Pipeline in Paradise - 2020
