= The Beep Test =

- French: La course navette
- Directed by: Maxime Aubert
- Written by: Maxime Aubert
- Produced by: Audrey D. Laroche
- Starring: Théodore Pellerin; Antoine L'Écuyer; Antoine Desrochers
- Cinematography: Hugo Gendron
- Edited by: Maxime Aubert
- Music by: Jérôme Guilleaume
- Release date: March 17, 2017 (Saguenay)
- Running time: 17 minutes
- Country: Canada
- Language: French

The Beep Test (French: La course navette) is a Canadian short drama film, directed by Maxime Aubert and released in 2017. The film centres on Wojtek (Théodore Pellerin), a new student at his school who is bullied, but finds a way to turn the tables on his tormentors when they are all required to perform the multi-stage fitness test in physical education class.

The film premiered in March 2017 at the Saguenay International Short Film Festival. In November it was included in the lineup of Plein(s) écran(s), an online festival of short films from Quebec which uses Facebook as its platform.

The film was a shortlisted Canadian Screen Award finalist for Best Live Action Short Drama at the 6th Canadian Screen Awards.
