= The Demons (2015 film) =

- Film poster
- French: Les Démons
- Directed by: Philippe Lesage
- Written by: Philippe Lesage
- Produced by: Philippe Lesage; Galilé Marion-Gauvin
- Starring: Édouard Tremblay-Grenier; Laurent Lucas; Pascale Bussières
- Cinematography: Nicolas Canniccioni
- Edited by: Mathieu Bouchard-Malo
- Music by: Pye Corner Audio
- Production companies: Les Films de l'Autre; Productions Unité centrale
- Distributed by: FunFilm Distribution Inc.
- Release date: September 25, 2015 (San Sebastian)
- Running time: 118 minutes
- Country: Canada
- Language: French

The Demons (French: Les Démons) is a 2015 Canadian drama film, written and directed by Philippe Lesage.

Based in part on Lesage's own childhood, the film stars Édouard Tremblay-Grenier as Félix, a ten-year-old boy living with his family in a quiet suburb of Montreal who is prone to excessive worry. As a series of child abductions begins to grip the town, however, his vague and needless fears begin to give way to something much more real.

The film's cast also includes Laurent Lucas, Pascale Bussières, Victoria Diamond, Vassili Schneider, Sarah Mottet, Théodore Pellerin, Bénédicte Décary, Milya Corbeil Gauvreau and Pier-Luc Funk.

The film was shot in August/September 2014 in Montreal and vicinity.

The film premiered in September 2015 at the San Sebastian Film Festival. It was released in the province of Quebec (on 8 screens) on 30 October 2015. In December, the film was announced as part of the Toronto International Film Festival's annual Canada's Top Ten screening series of the ten best Canadian films of the year.

The film was nominated for the 2016 Ingmar Bergman International Debut Award at the Gothenburg Film Festival.

Tremblay-Grenier reprised his role as Félix in a segment of Lesage's 2018 film Genesis (Genèse).

== Awards and nominations ==
- 2015: Critic Award (AQCC) for Best Film, International Competition, Festival of New Cinema, 2015
- 2016: Canada's Top Ten, Toronto International Film Festival
- 2016: Nomination for Best Film, Gala du Cinema Quebecois
- 2016: Nomination for Best Director, Gala du Cinéma Québécois
- 2016: Gilles-Carles Award for Best First or Second feature fiction film
- 2016: Prix Luc-Perreault / AQCC for Best Film from Quebec
- 2016: Nomination for Best Motion Picture, Canadian Screen Awards
- 2016: Nomination for Best achievement in Directing, Canadian Screen Awards
- 2016: Nomination for The Ingmar Bergman International Debut Award
- 2016: Titanic Award for Best Film, International Competition, Budapest
- 2016: Golden Gate New Director Prize, San Francisco International Film Festival
