= Limit Is the Sky =

Documentary film about dreams and challenges in Fort McMurray, Canada

- Directed by: Julia Ivanova
- Written by: Julia Ivanova
- Produced by: Bonnie Thompson
- Cinematography: Julia Ivanova
- Edited by: Julia Ivanova
- Production company: National Film Board of Canada
- Release date: September 26, 2016 (CIFF)
- Running time: 100 minutes
- Country: Canada
- Language: English

Limit Is the Sky is a Canadian documentary film, directed by Julia Ivanova and released in 2016. The film is a portrait of six young adults who moved to Fort McMurray, Alberta, to pursue financial security in the Alberta oil sands boom of the early 2010s, only to find their dreams evaporating in the face of the declining price of oil and the 2016 Fort McMurray wildfire.

The film premiered at the Calgary International Film Festival in 2016.

The film was the winner of the Colin Low Award at the 2017 DOXA Documentary Film Festival.
