= The Soldier's Lagoon =

2024 Canadian documentary film

- Spanish: La Laguna del Soldado
- Directed by: Pablo Álvarez Mesa
- Produced by: Pablo Álvarez Mesa
- Cinematography: Pablo Álvarez Mesa
- Edited by: Pablo Álvarez Mesa
- Music by: Stephan Schneider; Alex Lane; Pablo Álvarez-Mesa
- Release date: March 26, 2024 (Cinéma du Réel)
- Running time: 76 minutes
- Countries: Colombia, Canada
- Language: Spanish

The Soldier's Lagoon (Spanish: La Laguna del Soldado) is a Canadian-Colombian documentary film, directed by Pablo Álvarez Mesa and released in 2024. The film profiles a lake high in the Andes mountains in Colombia, where the bodies of over 200 soldiers who died during Simón Bolívar's 1819 march across the Andes are still found.

The film premiered in March 2024 at the Cinéma du Réel festival in France, and had its Canadian premiere at the 2024 Hot Docs Canadian International Documentary Festival.

== Awards ==
At Cinéma du Réel, the film won the SACEM Prize from the Société civile des auteurs multimédia.

At Hot Docs, the film won the Best Canadian Feature Documentary award. At the DOXA Documentary Film Festival, it was the winner of the Colin Low Award.
