= The Heart that Beats =

2010 Canadian documentary film

The Heart That Beats
- French: Ce cœur qui bat
- Directed by: Philippe Lesage
- Written by: Philippe Lesage
- Produced by: Philippe Lesage; Bruno Guay
- Cinematography: Philippe Lesage
- Edited by: Mathieu Bouchard-Malo
- Production company: Les Films du 3 mars
- Release date: November 10, 2010 (RIDM)
- Running time: 82 minutes
- Country: Canada
- Language: French

The Heart That Beats (French: Ce cœur qui bat) is a Canadian documentary film, directed by Philippe Lesage and released in 2010. Inspired by his own stay in a hospital after undergoing heart surgery, the film is a meditation on the human condition which profiles the suffering of patients in the emergency ward at Montreal's Hôtel-Dieu hospital, and the dedication of health care workers who strive to relieve it.

The film premiered at the 2010 Montreal International Documentary Festival, before going into commercial release in 2011.

At RIDM, the film won the Cinémathèque québécoise award for Best Quebec/Canadian Film, and Lesage won the award for Most Promising Quebec/Canadian Director. The film won the Prix Jutra for Best Documentary Film at the 14th Jutra Awards in 2012.
