= Crazywater =

- Directed by: Dennis Allen
- Written by: Dennis Allen; Carmen Pollard
- Produced by: Selwyn Jacob
- Cinematography: Kirk Tougas
- Edited by: Carmen Pollard
- Production company: National Film Board of Canada
- Release date: November 4, 2013 (AIFF)
- Running time: 56 minutes
- Country: Canada
- Language: English

Crazywater is a Canadian documentary film, directed by Dennis Allen and released in 2013. Adapted from Brian Maracle's non-fiction book Crazywater: Native Voices on Addiction and Recovery, the film centres on the issue of alcoholism in First Nations communities.

The film premiered on November 4, 2013, at the American Indian Film Festival, and had its Canadian premiere at the 2014 Available Light Film Festival. Allen subsequently took the film on a nine-stop tour of communities in the Northwest Territories, as part of a special film festival devoted to mental health and addiction awareness.

== Awards ==
At the 2014 DOXA Documentary Film Festival, the film received an honorable mention from the Colin Low Award jury.
