= Théodore Pellerin =

Canadian actor (born 1997)

- Born: Théodore Chouinard-Pellerin; June 13, 1997 (age 29); Quebec, Canada
- Occupation: Actor
- Years active: 2014–present
- Mother: Marie Chouinard

Théodore Chouinard-Pellerin (French: [teɔdɔʁ pɛl(ə)ʁɛ̃], born June 13, 1997) is a Canadian actor. He had his breakout role in the 2018 film Family First, which earned him a Canadian Screen Award for Best Actor and the Prix Iris for Revelation of the Year.

== Life and career ==
Pellerin was born in Quebec in 1997, the son of dancer/choreographer Marie Chouinard and painter Denis Pellerin. He made his debut on the Ici Télé television series 30 vies in 2014.

Pellerin has appeared in the films Endorphine (2015), The Demons (2015), Boost (2016), It's Only the End of the World (2016), The Beep Test (2017), Never Steady, Never Still (2017), Boy Erased (2018), Isla Blanca (2018), Genesis (2018), Ville Neuve (2018), Never Rarely Sometimes Always (2020), and Lurker (2025). In 2019, he portrayed the pyramid scheme true believer Cody Bonar on the Showtime series On Becoming a God in Central Florida.

In August 2019, Pellerin was cast in the Netflix slasher film There's Someone Inside Your House, released on October 6, 2021. In 2020, he narrated a portion of the 8th Canadian Screen Awards.

In 2024, he received a CSA nomination for Best Lead Performance in a Drama Film at the 12th Canadian Screen Awards, and won the Prix Iris for Best Actor at the 26th Quebec Cinema Awards for the film Solo (2023).

In October 2025, Pellerin joined the cast of Nicole Garcia's upcoming film Milo.

== Filmography ==
Key
†	Denotes films that have not yet been released

=== Film ===
Year	Title	Role	Notes
2015	Endorphine	Grégoire	
2015	The Demons	David	
2016	Boost	Dev	
2016	It's Only the End of the World (Juste la fin du monde)	Antoine	
2017	Never Steady, Never Still	Jamie	
2017	The Beep Test (La course navette)	Wojtek	Short film
2017	Squat (Ailleurs)	Samu	
2018	Family First (Chien de garde)	Vincent	
2018	Boy Erased	Xavier	
2018	Genesis (Genèse)	Guillaume	
2018	At First Light	Sean	
2018	Isla Blanca	Émile	
2018	Ville Neuve	Ulysse	
2020	Never Rarely Sometimes Always	Jasper	
2020	Underground (Souterrain)	Julien	
2020	My Salinger Year	Boy from Winston-Salem	
2021	There's Someone Inside Your House	Oliver "Ollie" Larsson	
2021	Mayday	Radio Man / Dimitri	
2022	Continental Drift (South) (La dérive des continents (au sud))	Albert Adler	
2023	Beau Is Afraid	Beau's Son	
2023	Solo	Simon	
2025	Lurker	Matthew Morning	
2025	Nino	Nino	
2026	Milo †	Milo	
TBA	Cry to Heaven †	Caffarelli	Post-production

=== Television ===
TV series

Year	Title	Role	Notes
2014	30 vies	Sammy Azoulay	Recurring role
2014	La théorie du K.O.	Sébastien	Episode: "Espirit de contradiction"
2019	On Becoming a God in Central Florida	Cody Bonar	Main role
2019	The OA	Liam	3 episodes
2021	Patrick Senécal présente	Gabriel Fortin	Episode: "Audition"

TV films and miniseries

Year	Title	Role	Notes
2021	Maid	Wayne	
2022	Pour toi Flora	Frère Thibodeau	
2024	Franklin	Gilbert du Motier, Marquis de Lafayette	
2024	Becoming Karl Lagerfeld	Jacques de Bascher	
