= First Stripes =

- French: Premières armes
- Directed by: Jean-François Caissy
- Written by: Jean-François Caissy
- Produced by: Johanne Bergeron; Colette Loumède
- Cinematography: Nicolas Canniccioni
- Edited by: Mathieu Bouchard-Malo
- Music by: Julien Bilodeau
- Production company: National Film Board of Canada
- Release date: January 19, 2018 (Berlin)
- Running time: 106 minutes
- Country: Canada
- Language: French

First Stripes (French: Premières armes) is a Canadian documentary film, directed by Jean-François Caissy and released in 2018. The film profiles a group of Canadian Armed Forces recruits commencing basic training.

The film had its world premiere at the 2018 Berlin International Film Festival, and its Canadian premiere at the 2018 Hot Docs Canadian International Documentary Festival.

Nicolas Canniccioni received a Canadian Screen Award nomination for Best Cinematography in a Documentary at the 7th Canadian Screen Awards.
