= East Hastings Pharmacy =

- Directed by: Antoine Bourges
- Produced by: Antoine Bourges
- Starring: Shauna Hansen
- Cinematography: Lindsay George
- Edited by: Antoine Bourges
- Production company: Medium Density Fibreboard Films
- Distributed by: Canadian Filmmakers Distribution Centre
- Release date: March 28, 2012 (Cinéma du Réel)
- Running time: 47 minutes
- Country: Canada
- Language: English

East Hastings Pharmacy is a 2012 Canadian docufiction film, directed by Antoine Bourges. The film is a portrait of a methadone clinic for drug addicts in the East Hastings neighbourhood of Vancouver, British Columbia, scripted and performed through an improvisational process with various real-life drug addicts, with professional actress Shauna Hansen playing the role of the pharmacist.

The film premiered in March 2012 at the Cinéma du Réel film festival.

It was the winner of the Colin Low Award for Best Canadian Documentary at the 2013 DOXA Documentary Film Festival, and cowinner with Rodrigo Barriuso's For Dorian of the Lindalee Tracey Award at the 2013 Hot Docs Canadian International Documentary Festival.
