= Concrete Valley =

2022 Canadian film directed by Antoine Bourges

- Directed by: Antoine Bourges
- Written by: Antoine Bourges; Teyama Alkamli
- Produced by: Shehrezade Mian
- Starring: Hussam Douhna; Amani Ibrahim; Abdullah Nadaf; Aliya Kanani
- Cinematography: Nikolay Michaylov
- Edited by: Lindsay Allikas
- Music by: Nawars Nader
- Production companies: General Use; Markhor Pictures
- Distributed by: MDFF
- Release date: September 12, 2022 (TIFF)
- Running time: 90 minutes
- Country: Canada
- Languages: English; Arabic

Concrete Valley is a Canadian drama film, directed by Antoine Bourges and released in 2022. The film centres on a family of Syrian immigrants to Canada who are struggling to establish themselves in the Thorncliffe Park neighbourhood of Toronto, Ontario. The film has a cast of predominantly amateur actors.

The film was written by Bourges and Teyama Alkamli, based in part on interviews with the cast about their own real experiences as immigrants. It stars Hussam Douhna as Rashid, who was a doctor in Syria but has been humiliated by his inability to use his skills in his new home; Amani Ibrahim as his wife Fahra, who finds meaning by participating in a volunteer neighbourhood cleanup crew; and Abdullah Nadaf as their son Ammar. Aliya Kanani, the main professional actress in the cast, has a supporting role as the leader of the community cleanup group.

The film premiered in the Wavelengths program at the 2022 Toronto International Film Festival. It was later screened at the 73rd Berlin Film Festival in February 2023, before going into commercial release in July.

== Critical response ==
Barry Hertz of The Globe and Mail positively reviewed the film, writing that "the performers’ sometimes stilted, halting line-readings circumvent a sense of amateurism due to the film’s central thematic preoccupations – every character here is learning to live a new life, unsure of themselves, their language, their place. The result is rather thrilling, with Bourges, his co-writer Teyama Alkamli and his cast building a different kind of cinematic storytelling right before our eyes."
