= Genesis (2018 Canadian film) =

- French: Genèse
- Directed by: Philippe Lesage
- Written by: Philippe Lesage
- Produced by: Galilé Marion-Gauvin
- Starring: Théodore Pellerin; Noée Abita; Pier-Luc Funk
- Cinematography: Nicolas Canniccioni
- Edited by: Mathieu Bouchard-Malo
- Production company: Productions l'Unite Centrale
- Release date: August 5, 2018 (Locarno)
- Running time: 129 minutes
- Country: Canada
- Language: French

Genesis (French: Genèse) is a Canadian drama film, directed by Philippe Lesage and released in 2018. The film stars Théodore Pellerin and Noée Abita as Guillaume Bonnet and Charlotte, teenage half-siblings simultaneously struggling with romance; Charlotte is in a relationship with Maxime (Pier-Luc Funk), but is reeling from his proposal that they change to an open relationship, while Guillaume is a student at an all-boys boarding school who is developing a romantic and sexual attraction to his classmate Nicolas (Jules Roy Sicotte).

The cast also includes Paul Ahmarani, Rose-Marie Perreault, Jean-Simon Leduc, Amaryllis Tremblay and Mylène Mackay. The film also includes a segment which shifts to focus on the story of Félix (Édouard Tremblay-Grenier), the lead character of Lesage's 2015 film The Demons (Les Démons).

The film premiered at the Locarno Festival in the International Competition.

== Awards ==
The film has won numerous awards including the Golden Wolf at the Festival du nouveau cinéma, Best Film and Best Director Awards at Seminci in Valladolid (Spain) and Best Film at Los Cabos International Film Festival (Mexico) festivals.

The film received an honorable mention for the Best Canadian Film award at the 2018 Vancouver International Film Festival. In December 2018, the Toronto International Film Festival named the film to its annual year-end Canada's Top Ten list.

Genesis received three Canadian Screen Award nominations at the 7th Canadian Screen Awards, for Best Picture, Best Original Screenplay (Lesage) and Best Supporting Actor (Ahmarani). It also received five Prix Iris nominations at the 21st Quebec Cinema Awards, for Best Film, Best Actor (Pellerin), Best Supporting Actor (Funk), Best Editing (Mathieu Bouchard-Malo) and Best Make-Up (Dominique T. Hasbani).
