= Nicolas Canniccioni =

Canadian cinematographer

- Occupations: Cinematographer; Additional director of photography

Nicolas Canniccioni is a Canadian cinematographer.

In 2009, Canniccioni served as additional director of photography for Xavier Dolan's I Killed My Mother. In 2015, he was nominated for a Canadian Screen Award for Best Cinematography in a Documentary with Jean-Pierre St-Louis for Where I'm From.

With director Simon Lavoie, he began shooting the film The Little Girl Who Was Too Fond of Matches on 4 September 2016 in Montreal and the Laurentides. Canniccioni and Lavoie chose to shoot in black and white, with Canniccioni employing a Red Epic Monochrome 6K camera. He was nominated for the Canadian Screen Award for Best Cinematography.

At the 7th Canadian Screen Awards, Canniccioni was nominated for Best Cinematography in a Documentary for First Stripes. He shot Kuessipan (2019) in Innu Takuaikan Uashat Mak Mani-Utenam and Sept-Îles, Quebec. For Kuessipan, he was nominated for Best Cinematography at the 22nd Quebec Cinema Awards.

== Filmography ==
His films include:

- Journey's End (La Belle Visite) - 2010
- Opening Up (M'ouvrir) - 2010
- Laurentia (Laurentie) - 2011
- Small Blind (La mise à l'aveugle) - 2012
- La Playa DC - 2013
- The Demons (Les Démons) - 2015
- Nina - 2015
- The Handout (Autrui) - 2015
- X500 - 2016
- Early Winter - 2016
- Those Who Make Revolution Halfway Only Dig Their Own Graves (Ceux qui font les révolutions à moitié n'ont fait que se creuser un tombeau) - 2016
- Genesis (Genèse) - 2018
- The Castle (Le Château) - 2020
- Bootlegger - 2021
- Ousmane - 2021
- Rojek - 2022
- A Respectable Woman (Une femme respectable) - 2023
- perfectly a strangeness - 2024
- Best Boy - 2025
- Kindergarten (Jardin d'enfants) - 2025
- Where the River Begins (Donde comenzia el rio) - 2026
