= Yosef Baraki =

Canadian film director

- Born: Yosef Baraki; November 10, 1989 (age 36)
- Occupation: Film director
- Years active: 2015-present
- Notable work: Mina Walking
- Awards: Ecumenical Commendation, NETPAC Award, Canadian Screen Award, Lindalee Tracey Award, Norman McLaren Award

Yosef Baraki (born November 10, 1989) is a Canadian filmmaker, writer, editor and film producer. He is best known for his feature film debut Mina Walking, which premiered at the 65th Berlin International Film Festival and won the inaugural Discovery Award at the 4th Canadian Screen Awards in 2016.

His work is characterized by unconventional dramatic structure and realism focused on the spiritual.

== Early life ==
Baraki studied film and television production and philosophy at Toronto's York University and Humber College. Prior to making Mina Walking, he won the Norman McLaren Award at the 2013 Canadian Student Film Festival for his student film Der Kandidat.
