= Dmitry Volkov (businessman) =

Russian businessman

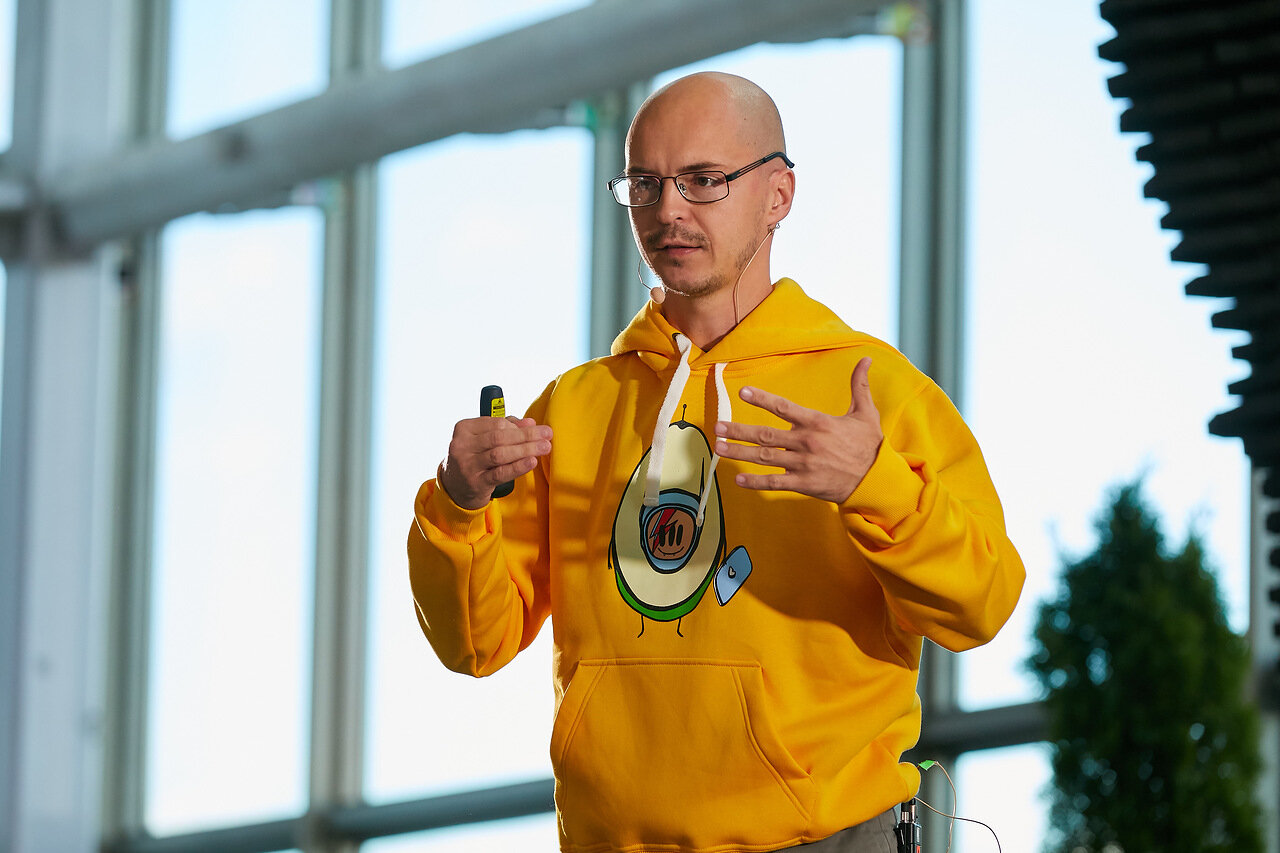
- Born: Dmitry Borisovich Volkov; 9 July 1976 (age 50); Moscow, Soviet Union
- Citizenship: Malta
- Occupation: businessman

Dmitriy Borisovich Volkov (Russian: Дмитрий Борисович Волков; born 9 July 1976) is a Russian businessman.

== Education ==
Volkov studied at the Faculty of History of Moscow State University (MSU), receiving his bachelor's degree in 1998 and his doctoral degree in 2008.

In 2009, he was among the founders of the Moscow Center for Consciousness Studies (MCCS) at the Department of Philosophy of Moscow State University. In 2012, he published «The Boston Zombie: D. Dennett and His Theory of Consciousness». In 2014, he became a member of the American Philosophical Association.

In June 2014, Volkov organized an international academic conference entitled «Problems of Consciousness and Free Will in Analytic Philosophy». The conference took place aboard the Rembrandt van Rijn during a voyage near the coast of Greenland.

== Career ==
In 2017, he defended his habilitation thesis, entitled «Problems of Free Will and Moral Responsibility in Analytic Philosophy in the Late Twentieth and Early Twenty-First Centuries». In February 2019, he published his second book, «Free Will: Illusion or Opportunity».

Volkov founded his first two company, IT-online and SD group, in 1998 and 2014, respectively. In 2013, he invested $20 million in Bitfury, a cryptocurrency developer. He joined the board of Gagarin Capital, a venture capital, in 2019; he also acquired a stake in Dating Group that year.

== ICIJ investigation ==
In July 2026, the International Consortium of Investigative Journalists (ICIJ) published an investigation into the business practices of dating platforms associated with Volkov's Social Discovery Group (SDG). The investigation described Volkov as the primary owner of a network of more than 60 dating brands operated through companies including SDG, Social Discovery Ventures, SOL Networks and SOL Holdings. According to ICIJ, SOL Networks was the group's central operating company and operated platforms including Dating.com and AmoLatina during parts of the period examined.

=== Allegations regarding Dating.com and AnastasiaDate operations ===
In May 2026, the independent Russian outlet Verstka published an investigation linking Volkov, as a co-founder of Social Discovery Group, to the operation of Dating.com and AnastasiaDate, which it described as systematically deceiving paying users. Drawing on interviews with current and former employees of a Tbilisi-based contractor, Web Flex, the report stated that conversations users believed to be with the people shown in profiles were instead produced by shift-working operators impersonating them around the clock, increasingly with the assistance of artificial intelligence. According to the investigation, operators used voice-cloning tools to conduct paid calls in a model's voice, a content department generated photographs and videos of the models on demand, and an embedded chatbot continued conversations whenever an operator did not reply within a minute.

The investigation described a business model in which revenue is extracted per action, with users paying site "credits" for each message, photograph, minute of video, and virtual gift, which it said created a financial incentive to prolong correspondence while never allowing a real-world meeting. It reported individual users spending thousands of dollars per month, including one 70-year-old American described as spending US$8,000 in a single month. Verstka noted that the Dating.com terms of service disclose that the company may engage independent contractors termed "Suppliers" who have access to all user correspondence, while the same terms prohibit users from employing bots or "artificial personalities".

Volkov denied having any operational management in the group, or that the individuals identified as operating Web Flex had ever worked under him. A public relations management firm responded on behalf of Social Discovery Group.
