= Trevor Anderson (filmmaker) =

Canadian filmmaker and musician

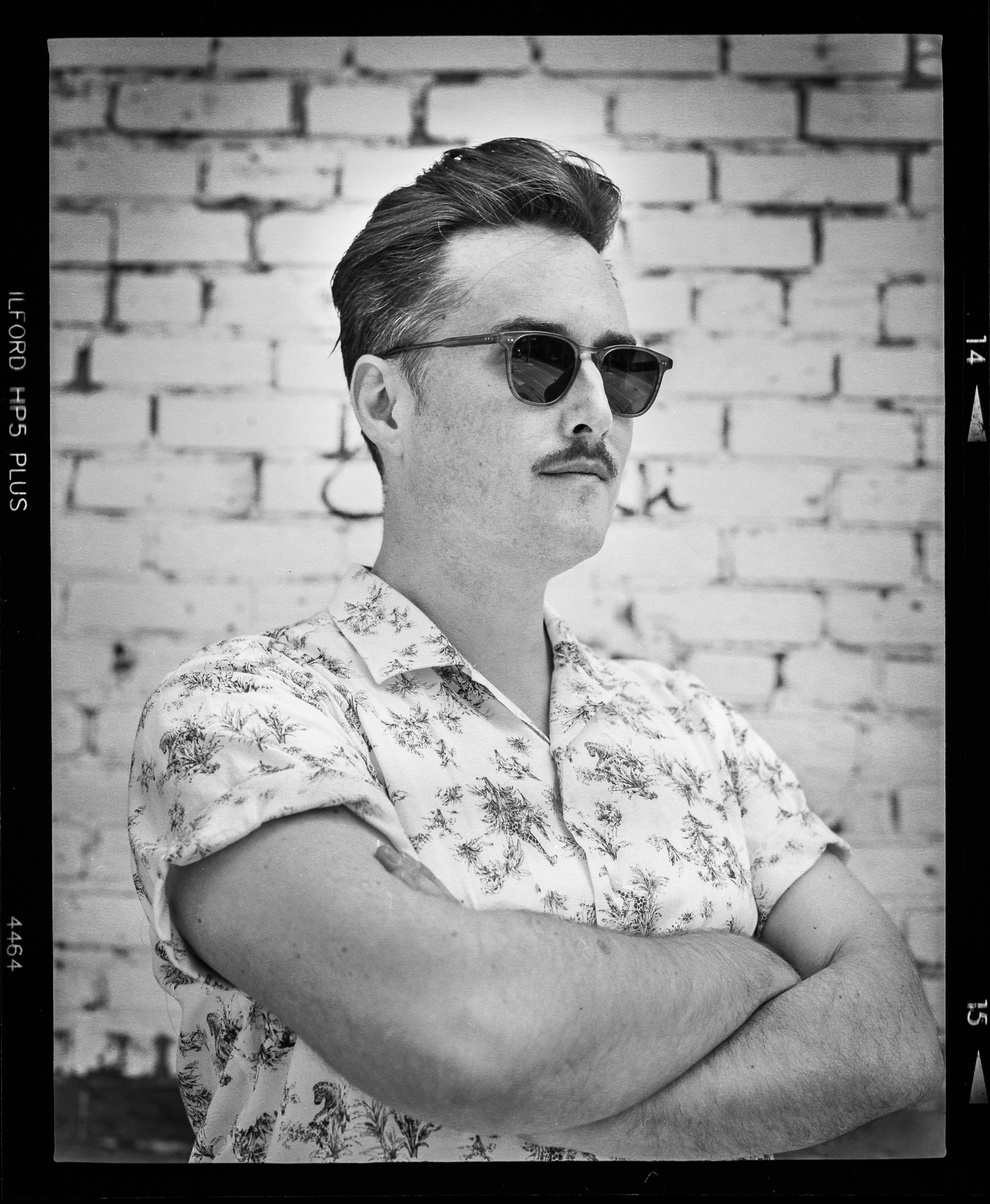
- Occupations: Filmmaker, musician
- Website: trevorandersonfilms.com

Trevor Anderson is a Canadian filmmaker and musician. His films have screened at the Sundance Film Festival, Berlin International Film Festival, and the Toronto International Film Festival.

== Filmography ==
Anderson has written and directed numerous award-winning short films.

- Rugburn (2005) screened at dozens of international film festivals, including the London Lesbian and Gay Film Festival and the Nashville Film Festival.
- Rock Pockets (2007) won the inaugural Lindalee Tracey Award at the 2007 Hot Docs Canadian International Documentary Festival, presented annually to an emerging Canadian filmmaker working with "passion, humanity, a strong sense of social justice, and a sense of humor." It won Honourable Mention for Most Innovative Short Film at the 2007 Seattle Lesbian & Gay Film Festival. The film is shown in Vancouver high schools by the Out in Schools initiative to address LGBTQ issues, homophobia, and bullying in the classroom.
- DINX (2008) was made through the Drama Prize program at the National Screen Institute of Canada. It, along with "Rock Pockets," was shortlisted for the Iris Prize in Cardiff, Wales, the world's largest gay and lesbian short film award.
- Carpet Diem (2008) premiered at the American Film Institute's 2008 AFI Fest in Los Angeles, and toured Canada in the Canadian Film Centre Worldwide Short Film Festival Best Shorts of 2009 National Tour.
- The Island (2009) premiered at the 2009 Berlin International Film Festival. It won the Jury Award for Best Short Film at the Pink Apple Film Festival in Zürich, Switzerland.
- Punchlines (2009), was created by Anderson when he participated in the 2009 Toronto International Film Festival Talent Lab, which was led by Danny Boyle, Miranda July, and Don McKellar.
- Figs in Motion (2010) was commissioned by the Art Gallery of Alberta to celebrate their grand re-opening. The film played at the Expresión en Corto International Film Festival in Guanajuato, Mexico, the Festival du nouveau cinéma in Montreal, Quebec; and the Ann Arbor Film Festival in Ann Arbor, Michigan.
- The High Level Bridge (2010) screened at the 2010 Sundance Film Festival. It was included in the 2010 Sundance Institute Art House Project, where it was favorably reviewed by Roger Ebert. It screened at South by Southwest (SXSW), the Los Angeles Film Festival, and the Toronto International Film Festival. At the American Film Institute's AFI Fest in Los Angeles, it won Honorable Mention for Live Action Short Film.
- The Man That Got Away (2012) premiered at the 2012 Berlin International Film Festival, where it won the D.A.A.D Short Film Prize. It screened at South by Southwest (SXSW), and the Hot Docs Canadian International Documentary Festival. The film was broadcast in Canada by CBC Television and in France by Canal+. It was included in the 2013 Alberta Biennial of Contemporary Art.
- The Little Deputy (2015) premiered at the 2015 Sundance Film Festival.
- Docking (2019) premiered at the 2019 Sundance Film Festival.
- Jesse Jams (2020) premiered at Outfest Fusion, Los Angeles. The film was also screened as part of the Edmonton Short Film Festival's 10 year anniversary '10 Days of Film' event at K-Days in 2022.

His debut feature film, Before I Change My Mind, premiered at the 75th Locarno Film Festival in 2022.

In addition to appearing in his own films as a performer or narrator, he has also had supporting acting roles in the films of Matthew Rankin, most notably The Twentieth Century and Municipal Relaxation Module. In 2024, he served as a jury member of the DGC Audience Award for Best Canadian Film award ceremony at the 28th Fantasia International Film Festival.

== Music videos ==
- "Get Your Own Apartment" by the Wet Secrets (2008)
- "Floating in the Sky" by the Wet Secrets (2014)
- "Boys Like You" by Whitehorse (2017)

== Music ==
Anderson is co-founder and former drummer of the Canadian indie rock band the Wet Secrets, who have charted in the top ten on Canada's national campus radio chart. On January 8, 2010, their song "Secret March" was named by Grant Lawrence of CBC Radio 3 as one of the "Top 20 Best Songs of the 2000s." From 2001 to 2006, Anderson was a co-founder and drummer in the Edmonton punk two-piece The Vertical Struts.

In 2009, Anderson was commissioned by The City of Edmonton to create a piece of public art to commemorate the ICLEI World Congress, hosted in Edmonton in June 2009. He gathered several leading Edmonton musicians and songwriters to create the collaborative hour-long musical composition and free concert, "That's Edmonton For You!"
