= The Wet Secrets =

Canadian indie rock band

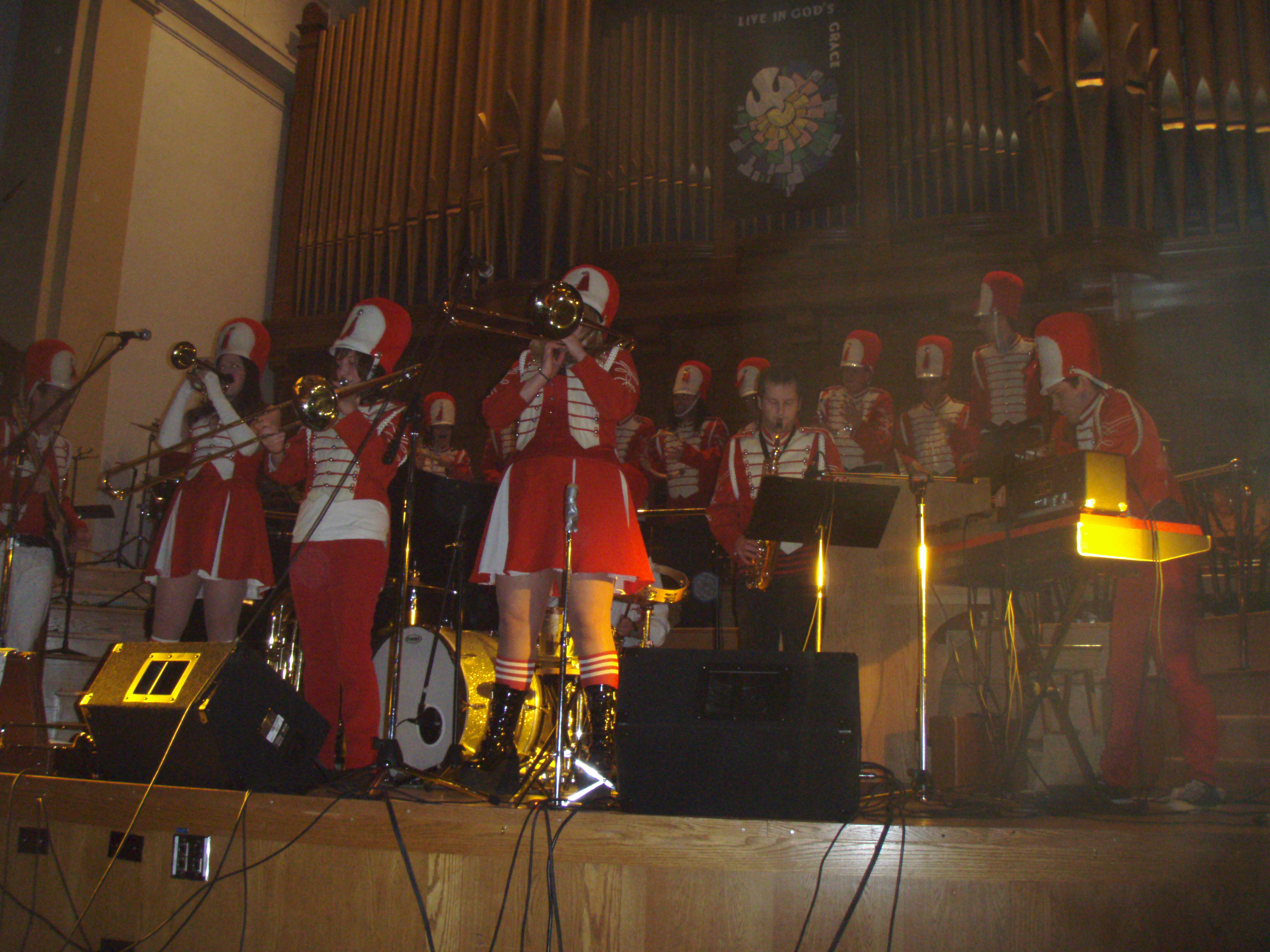
- The Wet Secrets in 2007

Background information
- Origin: Edmonton, Alberta, Canada
- Genres: indie rock
- Years active: 2005–present
- Label: Six Shooter Records
- Website: Official site

The Wet Secrets are a Canadian indie rock band from Edmonton, Alberta, known for their signature red and white marching band uniforms, and harmonious layers of horns, synthesizers, booming bass lines, percussion, drums and voice.

The band was formed on an impromptu dare between bassist Lyle Bell and drummer Trevor Anderson to write, record and release an album within one week. Their debut album A Whale of A Cow is the result (2005).

The band's second album, Rock Fantasy, was released online on Valentine's Day, 2007, peaking at the #2 spot on the CBC Radio 3 charts. It was later re-released in hard copy in 2008. “Secret March”, a track from the Rock Fantasy album, was recognized by Grant Lawrence of CBC Radio 3 as one of the Top 20 Best Songs of the 2000s.

After a hiatus spent focusing on other projects (Bell with Shout Out Out Out Out and Anderson directing Sundance Film Festival selected films) the band released a new album, Free Candy, in early 2014. Later that year, The Wet Secrets won the inaugural Peak Performance Project award (2014), an award designed to help develop Alberta-based emerging artists; and shortly thereafter, signed with Canadian record label Six Shooter Records. Free Candy was nominated for Best Rock Recording by the Western Canadian Music Awards in 2014; and in 2015, The Wet Secrets won the Edmonton Music Award for Album of the Year for Free Candy and Music Video of the Year for Nightlife.

In January 2016, The Wet Secrets released the EP, I Can Live Forever. CBC Music had included one of its four tracks, “I Can Swing A Hammer” in their Songs You Need To Hear, November 26, 2015 edition, calling it a “jangly, catchy, fist-pumping anthem”, worthy of repeating every morning.

== Band members ==
The original five members of the band were Lyle Bell, Trevor Anderson, Kim Rackel, Donna Ball and Jeremy Nischuk. Musician Doug Organ contributed to the Rock Fantasy album. By 2017, the band evolved into a six-member band composed of:

- Lyle Bell (bass guitar, lead vocals)
- Kim Rackel (trumpet, vocals)
- Emma Frazier (trombone, vocals)
- Paul Arnusch (keyboards, congas, vocals)
- Christan Maslyk (saxophone, percussion, vocals)
- Gravy (drums)

== Discography ==
- A Whale of A Cow (2005)
- Rock Fantasy (2007)
- Free Candy (2014)
- I Can Live Forever, EP (2016)
- The Tyranny of Objects (2017)

== Awards and recognition ==
- 2014 Peak Performance Project, winner
- 2015 Edmonton Music Awards, winner: Album of the Year, Free Candy; Music Video of the Year, Nightlife
