= Antoine Bourges =

French-Canadian filmmaker and screenwriter

- Born: Paris, France
- Education: University of British Columbia, York University
- Occupations: Filmmaker, Screenwriter, Professor
- Notable work: East Hastings Pharmacy, Fail to Appear, Concrete Valley
- Awards: Colin Low Award (East Hastings Pharmacy), Vancouver Film Critics Circle nominee (Fail to Appear)

Antoine Bourges is a French-Canadian filmmaker and screenwriter. He is most noted for his 2012 mid-length docudrama film East Hastings Pharmacy, which was the winner of the Colin Low Award at the 2013 DOXA Documentary Film Festival, and his 2017 narrative feature film Fail to Appear, which was a Vancouver Film Critics Circle nominee for Best Canadian Film at the Vancouver Film Critics Circle Awards 2017

== Early life ==
Bourges was originally from Paris, he moved to Canada as a teenager to play ice hockey; after failing to make the National Hockey League, he studied film at the University of British Columbia and York University. He remains based in Vancouver as a professor in the film program at UBC. He made a number of short films prior to East Hastings Pharmacy; the most noted of these, Woman Waiting, premiered at the 2010 Toronto International Film Festival, and was screened at the 2011 Berlin International Film Festival.

His newest film, Concrete Valley, premiered in the Wavelengths program at the 2022 Toronto International Film Festival. It is also slated to screen at the 73rd Berlin Film Festival on 21 February 2023.

== Filmography ==
- Hello Goodbye - 2008
- People Were There - 2008
- Woman Waiting - 2010
- East Hastings Pharmacy - 2012
- William in White Shirt - 2015
- Fail to Appear - 2017
- Concrete Valley - 2022
